= Wu Qiming =

The name Wu Qiming may refer to:

- Wu Qiming (伍启铭), cinematographer of the Chinese film The Curse of Turandot
- Wu Qiming (吴企明), a writer who wrote a book about the Chinese poet of the Tang dynasty Li He
- Wu Chi-ming (吳琪銘, born 1963), Taiwanese politician
