= Myres =

Myres is a given name and a surname. Notable people with the name include:

- Myres S. McDougal (1906–1998), Sterling Professor of International Law at the Yale Law School
- Alexander Myres (born 1996), American football cornerback
- Helen Alice Myres (1911–2010), the first major child star of American silent films
- John Myres Kt OBE FBA FRAI (1869–1954), British archaeologist and academic
- Nowell Myres FBA FSA CBE (1902–1989), British archaeologist and Bodley's Librarian at the Bodleian Library in Oxford
- Sandra Myres (1933–1991), American historian of the American Southwest
- Thomas Myres FRIBA (1842–1926), English railway architect

== See also ==
- Myres Castle, Scottish castle situated in Fife near the village of Auchtermuchty
- John Scrimgeour of Myres Castle, Master of Work for royal buildings for James V and Mary, Queen of Scots
- Myre (disambiguation)
- Miers (disambiguation)
