= Mire (disambiguation) =

A mire is a kind of wetland.

Mire or Miré may also refer to:

== Geography ==
- Miré, a commune in France
- Mire Loch, a Scottish body of water

== People ==
- Merxat or Mire, Chinese actor
- Mire Chatman (born 1978), American former professional basketball player
- Mire Hagi Farah Mohamed (1962-2006), Somali politician and government minister
- Hassan Ali Mire (fl. 1969-present), Somali politician, former Minister of Education
- Ismail Mire (c. 1862-1950), Somali poet and general
- Sada Mire (born 1977), Swedish-Somali archaeologist
- Solomon Mire (1989), Zimbabwean cricketer

== Other uses ==
- "Mire" (short story), by Anton Chekhov
- Mire language, spoken in Chad, Africa
- MIRE therapy, acronym for monochromatic infrared light energy, an alternate name for low level laser therapy

== See also ==
- Mir (disambiguation)
- Myre (disambiguation)
