= Run for Time =

- Genre: Variety show
- Based on: Run for Money Tosochuu by Fuji TV (CX)
- Country of origin: China
- Original language: Mandarin
- No. of seasons: 5
- No. of episodes: 45

Production
- Production location: Mainland China
- Camera setup: Multicamera setup
- Running time: 90 minutes

Original release
- Network: Hunan Television
- Release: 6 November 2015 – present

Related
- Run for money: Tōsō-chū, Cha$e

Run for Time (Chinese: 全员加速中; pinyin: Quányuán Jiāsù Zhōng, literally All Members Accelerating), is a Chinese variety show broadcasting on Hunan Television channel. The idea of the show is based on Fuji Television Network, Inc's Run for money: Tōsō-chū, also known as (Japanese: run for money 逃走中) (run for money 逃走中). In September 2017, Hunan TV announced the show would not be renewed for its third season.

In 2022, Hunan TV announced that the show will be returning in 2023 after a break of 7 years. Season 3 premiered on 10 June 2023.

== Cast ==
Run for Time features an all-star cast.

== Rules ==
In every season 1 episode of Run for Time, four hunters are sent out to capture seventeen or eighteen guest stars (or escapees). For every second the escapees survive, they gain 50 in-game credits, which will accumulate over the first eight episodes for the finals (ninth episode). If the escapees are caught by the hunters, they will be eliminated and are permitted to keep only ten percent of their credits for that particular round. Meanwhile, they have to complete certain tasks thrown to them in a given time frame while hiding from the hunters. If the escapees find a "refuge", they can choose to sign out and leave with the credits they have. If the escapees survive the whole course of 90 minutes (sometimes 100 minutes), they will be handsomely rewarded with 270,000 credits (or 300,000 in a 100-minute game).

The hunters cannot have any sort of communication with the escapees. They can only sprint when they see an escapee, and they cannot determine the escapee's location by looking for the cameramen. If the escapees manage to hide or run away from the hunter, the hunter will give up the chase.

== Cast members ==
=== Season 1 ===
- Wang Junkai
- Jackson Yee
- Roy Wang
- Jia Nailiang
- Du Chun
- Shen Mengchen
- Ada Choi
- Sean Zhang
- Zang Hong Na
- Huang Xiaoming
- Tian Liang
- Li Zi Feng (Hunter)

=== Season 2 ===
- Huang Jingyu (Censored from recorded episode due to SARFT)
- Xu Weizhou (Censored from recorded episode due to SARFT)
- Du Chun
- Tian Liang
- Song Xiaobao
- Lin Yun
- Ella Chen
- Du Haitao
- Wowkie Zhang
- Jiro Wang
- Shen Mengchen

=== Season 3 ===
- William Chan
- Gao Hanyu
- Dany Lee
- Qiao Xin
- Jin Mengjia
- Zhang Zhenyuan
- He Junlin
- Wu Dajing
- Ouyang Nana
- Ma Jiaqi
- Ding Chengxin
- Song Yaxuan
- Liu Yaowen
- Yan Haoxiang
- Sun Yan

=== Season 5 ===
- Ryan Cheng
- Su Xing
- Yin Haoyu (Patrick Finkler)
- Zhu Zhixin
- Zhang Zeyu
- Zhang Ji
- Zuo Hang
- Su Xinhao
- Yu Chengen
- Zhao Yihuan

== Guests ==
=== Season 1 ===
- Zhang Yijie
- Fan Tiantian
- Ju Jingyi
- Shawn Dou
- Xie Na
- Wang Likun
- Luo Jin
- Wowkie Zhang
- Chen Xiang
- Hawick Lau
- Jia Ling
- Elvis Han
- Jin Chen
- Zhang Xinyu
- Li Xiaolu
- Huang Yali
- Gan Wei
- Zeng Shunxi
- Wang Kai
- Ma Ke
- Charlene Choi
- Yu Haoming
- Ella Chen
- Bai Kainan
- Chen Sicheng
- Wang Baoqiang
- Xiaoshenyang
- Zhao Jiamin
- Zhang De Xing
- Li Yundi
- Zhang Liang
- Chen Ou
- Song Weilong
- Huang Qishan
- Wang Likun
- Huang Chia-chien
- Sun Jian
- Li Xiaolu
- Gigi Leung
- A-Lin
- Qu Ying
- Shen Ling
- Ady An

=== Season 2 ===
- Joey Yung
- Ning Jing
- Li Jiahang
- Wu Xin
- Jia Nailiang
- Wei Daxun
- Liu Wen
- Myolie Wu
- Charlene Choi
- Qiao Shan
- Zhang Liang
- Jessica Jung
- Hwang Chi Yeul
- Gary Chaw

=== Season 3 ===
- Li Jian
- Cai Chengyu
- Tong Mengshi
- Han Tianyu
- Yang Di
- Hu Lan
- Wang Yuexin
- Raymond Lam
- Su Xing
- Fan Shiqi
- Vanness Wu
- Zhang Yuan
- Victor Ma
- Gao Tingyu
- Wallace Chung
- Even Wang
- Darren Wang

=== Season 5 ===
- Ding Yuxi
- Qi Sijun
- Xia Zhiguang
- Zhang Yifan
- Xiao Gui
- Wang Churan
- Yu Yan
