= Love Under the Full Moon =

2021 Chinese television series

- Traditional Chinese: 滿月之下請相愛
- Simplified Chinese: 满月之下请相爱
- Hanyu Pinyin: Mǎnyuè zhī xià qǐng xiāng'ài
- Genre: Romance; Drama; Fantasy; Mystery
- Directed by: Li Haishu; Huang Yanwei
- Starring: Ju Jingyi; Zheng Yecheng
- Opening theme: Step by Step by Jia Yi
- Country of origin: China
- Original language: Mandarin
- No. of seasons: 1
- No. of episodes: 24

Production
- Running time: 45 mins
- Production company: iQIYI

Original release
- Network: iQIYI
- Release: August 26 – September 8, 2021

Love Under the Full Moon (Chinese: 满月之下请相爱; pinyin: Mǎnyuè zhī xià qǐng xiāng'ài) is a 2021 Chinese television series, starring Ju Jingyi and Zheng Yecheng, it aired on August 26 to September 8, 2021. The series is part of iQIYI's Sweet on Theater (Chinese: 恋恋剧场), an iQIYI original lineup of romantic television series.

== Synopsis ==
Due to a cosmic phenomenon caused by a super full moon, Lei Chuxia (Ju Jingyi) and Xu Xiaodong (Zheng Yecheng) meet and fall in love after travelling through time and space. As the "Dong-Xia" couple experiences hilarious and sweet moments, they begin to find out more about their connection from ten years ago and realize their encounter was truly fortuitous. With perseverance and dedication, they overcome obstacles in their way and ultimately receive a happy ending.

== Cast and characters ==
Main cast

- Ju Jingyi as Lei Chuxia, owns a dessert shop called Summer Time with Yuan
- Zheng Yecheng as Xu Xiaodong, famous mysterious game designer Winter

Supporting cast

- Merxat Yalkun as Wei Xuanhe, Lei's fiancé ten years ago
- Sun Yining as Yuan Yuan, Lei's best friend
- Shen Yao as Qin Yue, a famous host
- Zheng Fanxing as Jin Xiaorui, Xu's best friend

== Production ==
The series began filming in November 2020, and wrapped up in February 2021.
