= Zhao Jiamin =

Chinese idol singer and actress (born 1998)

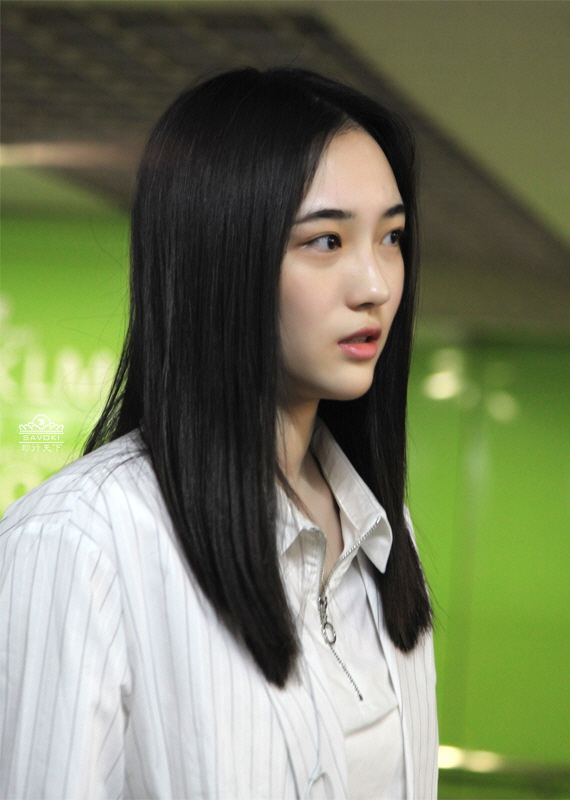
- Image of Zhao (2016)
- Born: July 22, 1998 (age 28); Shenzhen, Guangdong, China
- Education: Central Academy of Drama
- Occupations: Singer; actress
- Years active: 2013–present

Chinese name
- Traditional Chinese: 趙嘉敏
- Simplified Chinese: 赵嘉敏
Transcriptions
Standard Mandarin
- Hanyu Pinyin: Zhào Jiāmǐn
- Musical career
- Genres: Pop; Mandopop
- Instruments: Vocals; guitar
- Labels: Star48; Ninestyle Model Agency; Ninestyle Music
- Formerly of: SNH48; Seine River

Zhao Jiamin (simplified Chinese: 赵嘉敏; traditional Chinese: 趙嘉敏; pinyin: Zhào Jiāmǐn; born July 22, 1998, in Shenzhen, Guangdong, China) is a Chinese idol singer and actress. She is a former member of the female idol group SNH48, and came in first during SNH48's second general election.

== Career ==
On 14 October 2012, Zhao Jiamin became one of the 26 shortlisted candidates during the recruitment of SNH48 first-generation members. On 23 December, SNH48 was invited to the inauguration ceremony of the Fudan University Student Union, and she made her first performance as an SNH48 member.

On 12 January 2013, Zhao performed on SNH48 Research Students 1st Stage, "Give Me Power!", as a Research Student, and became an official member on 17 April. On 25 May, she performed on the "Blooming For You Concert" with other first-generation members, but due to an injury at the waist, she was unable to perform on most of the songs. On 28 May, she starred in SNH48's first web drama, Mengxiang Yubei Sheng. She made her first public performance as a first-generation member on 30 August, with the opening of the SNH48 Theatre. On 11 November, Zhao was assigned to Team SII during the formation of teams.

On 26 July 2014, Zhao garnered 11,079 votes during the 2014 General Election and was ranked third. On 14 November, she recorded the theme song of mobile game Mo Tian Ji (魔天记), "缘尽世间", with Ju Jingyi and Xu Jiaqi.

On 1 January 2015, Zhao was crowned the winner in the 2014 Baidu Tieba Live Performance Annual Chart and was given the chance to record a solo song. On 1 April, she released her solo single, "Mushi no Ballad". On 30 April, she made her second film appearance by starring in micro-movie MoTian Jie for mobile game Mo Tian Ji. On 25 July, she won SNH48's 2015 General Election with 74,393 votes. On 13 September, she became part of SNH48's first sub-unit Seine River with Ju Jingyi and Li Yitong, and released their first EP, "Sweet & Bitter". On 8 October, she was involved in the filming for Run for Time.

In February 2016, Zhao applied for the entrance examination to get into the Central Academy of Drama, during which she took an indefinite hiatus from SNH48. She was ranked 10th overall and started school in July 2016.

== Discography ==
=== With SNH48 ===
==== EPs ====
Year	No.	Title	Role	Notes
2013	1	Heavy Rotation	A-side	Debut with SNH48 Team SII
2013	2	Flying Get	A-side	Only involved in certain scenes in MV due to waist injury
2013	3	Fortune Cookie of Love	A-side	
2014	4	Heart Electric	A-side	
2014	5	UZA	A-side	
2015	6	Give Me Five!	A-side	Center performer
2015	7	After Rain	B-side	
2015	8	Manatsu no Sounds Good!	B-side	
2015	9	Halloween Night	A-side	Ranked 1st in the 2nd General election Center performer

==== Albums ====
- Mae Shika Mukanee (2014)

=== With Seine River ===
- Sweet & Bitter (2015)

== Units ==
=== SNH48 Stage Units ===
Stage No.	Song	Notes
Team SII 1st Stage "Saishuu Bell ga Naru"	Gomen ne Jewel 对不起我的宝贝	Stand-in
Team SII 1st Stage "Saishuu Bell ga Naru"	Hatsukoi Dorobou 初恋小盗	Stand-in for Tang Min
Team SII 2nd Stage "Nagai Hikari"	Renai Kinshi Jourei 恋爱禁止条例	With Li Yuqi and Mo Han
Team SII 3rd Stage "Pajama Drive"	Tenshi no Shippo 天使的尾巴	With Qiu Xinyi and Zhang Yuge
Team SII 4th Stage "RESET"	Seifuku Resistance 再见，制服	With Zhang Yuge and Dai Meng
Team SII 5th Stage "Yume wo Shinaseru Wake ni Ikanai"	Kioku no Dilemma 记忆迷宫	Stand-in

=== Concert units ===
Year	Date	Name	Song	Notes
2013	25 May	Blooming For You Concert	Hatsukoi Dorobou 初恋小盗	Did not perform for subsequent performances due to waist injury
2013	16 November	Guangzhou Concert	Hatsukoi Dorobou 初恋小盗	
2014	18 January	Red and White Concert	End Roll 曲终人散	With Chen Guanhui, Li Yuqi and Wu Zhehan
2014	26 July	SNH48 Sousenkyo Concert in Shanghai	None	
2015	31 January	Request Hour Setlist Best 30 2015	Our Destiny In This World 缘尽世间	With Xu Jiaqi and Ju Jingyi
2015	25 July	2nd General Election Concert	Mushi no Ballad 虫之诗	With Qiu Xinyi and Ju Jingyi

== Filmography ==
=== Movies ===
Year	Title	Role	Notes
2013	梦想预备生之半熟少女	Herself	
2015	MoTian Jie 魔天劫	Liuming 柳鸣	
2015	Love, At First 爱之初体验		Guest appearance
2015	Documentary of SNH48 SNH48 少女的巴別塔	Herself	SNH48 documentary

=== Variety shows ===
Year	Date	Channel	Title	Notes
2013	2 March, 21 April	Toonmax TV	炫动漫中国	
2013	29 March	Hubei Television	Challenge 挑战女人帮	
2013	24 May	Hunan Television	Day Day Up 天天向上	
2013	21 July	Channel Young	The Star Live 星光现场	
2013	3 October, 11 October	KanKan News	E Guo Hui E锅汇	
2014	11 April-29 August	TV Asahi Online	Shang High School 48 上海学院48	
2014	11 July-26 September	Tudou, Youku	SNHello	Ep. 6, 12
2014	26 November	Youku	不完全职业手册	
2014	29 November, 16 August	Hunan Television	People (In) News 新闻当事人	
2015	29 November, 16 August	Hunan Television	People (In) News 新闻当事人	
2015	18 February	CCTV-1	Dream Star Partner 梦想星搭档	Team SII with Phoenix Legend
2015	2 June	Hunan Television	I Am A Great Beauty 我是大美人	
2015	22 August	Dragon Television	Entertainment Online 新娱乐在线	
2015	13 November	Hunan Television	Run for Time 全员加速中	Ep. 2 contestant

== Endorsements ==
Year	Endorsement
2014	Glico Vegetable Snack－Hot Welsh Onion Taste; Suzuki; Sony Hi-Res Audio
2015	MoTian Ji; Glico Vegetable Snack; ArcheAge; Suzuki Swift
2016	Cornetto with Zhang Yixing (Lay)
