= Catman (film) =

- Theatrical release poster
- Simplified Chinese: 我爱喵星人
- Hanyu Pinyin: Wo Ai Miao Xing Ren
- Directed by: Park Hee-gon
- Screenplay by: Song Weihan; Zhouyi; Yin Suying; Zhang Yamei; Wei Tianyi
- Starring: Oh Se-hun; Janice Wu; Song Weilong
- Production companies: Huace Media; Croton Media
- Distributed by: Huace Pictures
- Release date: May 18, 2021
- Running time: 90 minutes
- Countries: South Korea; China
- Languages: Korean; Mandarin

Catman (Chinese: 我爱喵星人) is a 2021 Chinese-South Korean romantic-fantasy film directed by Park Hee-gon that was completed in 2016. The film stars Oh Sehun, Janice Wu and Song Weilong.

== Synopsis ==
Liang Qu (Oh Se-hun) is a chic, confident and cold but charming half human-half cat due to a magic spell and he has the ability to melt/heal broken hearts. He lives with Miao Xiao Wan (Janice Wu), an honest, confident woman who has created an app that translates cats' sounds and language.

== Cast ==
- Oh Sehun as Liang Qu
- Janice Wu as Miao Xiao Wan
- Song Weilong as Miao Xing Ren
- Ju Jingyi as Molly
- Xu Jiaqi as Vivian

== Release ==
The film was originally planned to be screened in 2017, but the release was postponed due to the THAAD missiles installation in South Korea which was strongly criticized by China and Russia. It was later scheduled to be released on March 14, 2021, but it was reported that the release date of the film had been extended indefinitely. After the restriction, it will be a rare work involving a South Korean star released to Chinese audiences. It was eventually released on May 18, 2021.
