= Myhre =

Myhre is a Norwegian surname. Notable people with the surname include:

- Aslak Sira Myhre (born 1973), Norwegian politician
- Erling Myhre (1903–1971), Norwegian chess player
- Geir Myhre (1954–2016), Norwegian ice hockey player and coach
- Hans Bernt Myhre (1817–?), Norwegian politician
- Jan Eivind Myhre (born 1947), Norwegian historian
- Janet Myhre, American statistician
- John Myhre, American production designer
- Knut Myhre (1931–2003), Norwegian politician
- Kyle Tran Myhre, a.k.a. Guante, (born 1983), American hip hop artist, poet, activist, and educator
- Lars Elton Myhre (born 1984), Norwegian alpine skier
- Lars Martin Myhre (1956–2024), Norwegian composer, guitarist, pianist, singer, and producer
- Lise Myhre (born 1975), Norwegian cartoonist
- Marius Myhre (born 1991), Norwegian badminton player
- Marthe Katrine Myhre (1985–2024), Norwegian triathlete and cross-country skier
- Nils Kristian Myhre (born 1971), Norwegian newspaper editor and footballer
- Øyvind Myhre (born 1945), Norwegian science fiction and fantasy author
- Peter N. Myhre (born 1954), Norwegian politician
- Petter Myhre (born 1972), Norwegian football player, coach and commentator
- Rolf Myhre (born 1939), Norwegian politician
- Sarah Myhre, American climate scientist
- Thomas Myhre (born 1973), Norwegian football player
- Vera Myhre (1920–2000), Danish artist
- Wencke Myhre (born 1947), Norwegian singer and actress

== See also ==
- Myhre syndrome, a rare genetic disorder
- André Myhrer, (born 1983), Swedish alpine skier
