= The Curse of Turandot =

- Official poster
- Traditional Chinese: 圖蘭朵：魔咒緣起
- Simplified Chinese: 图兰朵：魔咒缘起
- Hanyu Pinyin: Túlánduǒ: Mózhòu Yuánqǐ
- Directed by: Zheng Xiaolong
- Written by: Wang Xiaoping
- Based on: Turandot
- Produced by: Cao Ping; Dun Yong
- Starring: Guan Xiaotong; Dylan Sprouse; Hu Jun; Lin Siyi; Collin Chou; Wang Jia
- Cinematography: Wu Qiming
- Edited by: John Gilbert
- Music by: Simon Franglen
- Production companies: Dongyang LETV Huaer Film and Television Culture Co., Ltd. Zhongchuan Jiachang Film and Television Culture Co., Ltd.
- Distributed by: Tao Piao Piao
- Release date: 15 October 2021
- Running time: 111 minutes
- Country: China
- Language: Mandarin
- Box office: $2,950,000

The Curse of Turandot (Chinese: 图兰朵：魔咒缘起) is a 2021 Chinese romantic fantasy film directed by Zheng Xiaolong and starring Guan Xiaotong, Dylan Sprouse, Hu Jun, Lin Siyi, Collin Chou, and Wang Jia. The film is a loose adaptation of the opera Turandot.

The Curse of Turandot premiered in China on 15 October 2021.

== Premise ==
The plot is based on some aspects of the original story of the opera, including the obligation for foreign visitors to solve three riddles imposed by the fierce princess.

== Cast ==
- Guan Xiaotong as Turandot, princess of the Great Khanate.
  - Ulantoya Do as Little Turandot
- Dylan Sprouse as Calaf, an orphan who falls in love with Turandot.
- Hu Jun as General Boyan.
- Lin Siyi as Liu Er
- Collin Chou as Zhou Da
- Wang Jia as Prince Wutong
- Jiang Wen as Khan, father of Turandot.
- Sophie Marceau as Queen of Malvia
- Vincent Perez as King of Malvia

== Release ==
The Curse of Turandot was released in China on 15 October 2021.

== Reception ==
Chinese social media awarded the film the unofficial distinction of "worst movie of 2021".

A review at Sinocinema found the visual quality of the film interesting but criticised the plot and acting. Another found the blend of Western and Chinese aspects to be disappointing.
