= Myre =

Myre refers to the following:

== Places ==
- Mire or quagmire, a geographical wetland or metaphorical equivalent
- Myre, Andøy, a village in Andøy municipality, Nordland county, Norway
- Myre, Øksnes, a village in Øksnes municipality, Nordland county, Norway
- Myre Church, a church in Myre, Øksnes municipality, Nordland county, Norway
- Myre-Big Island State Park, a state park in Minnesota, USA, just outside the city of Albert Lea

== People ==
- Greg Myre, American journalist who reported for The New York Times from Jerusalem
- Odd Myre, Norwegian marketing agent
- Phil Myre, retired Canadian professional ice hockey goaltender

== See also ==
- Mire (disambiguation)
- Myhre (disambiguation)
- Myra (disambiguation)
