= Zeng Yanfen =

Chinese idol singer and actress (born 1991)

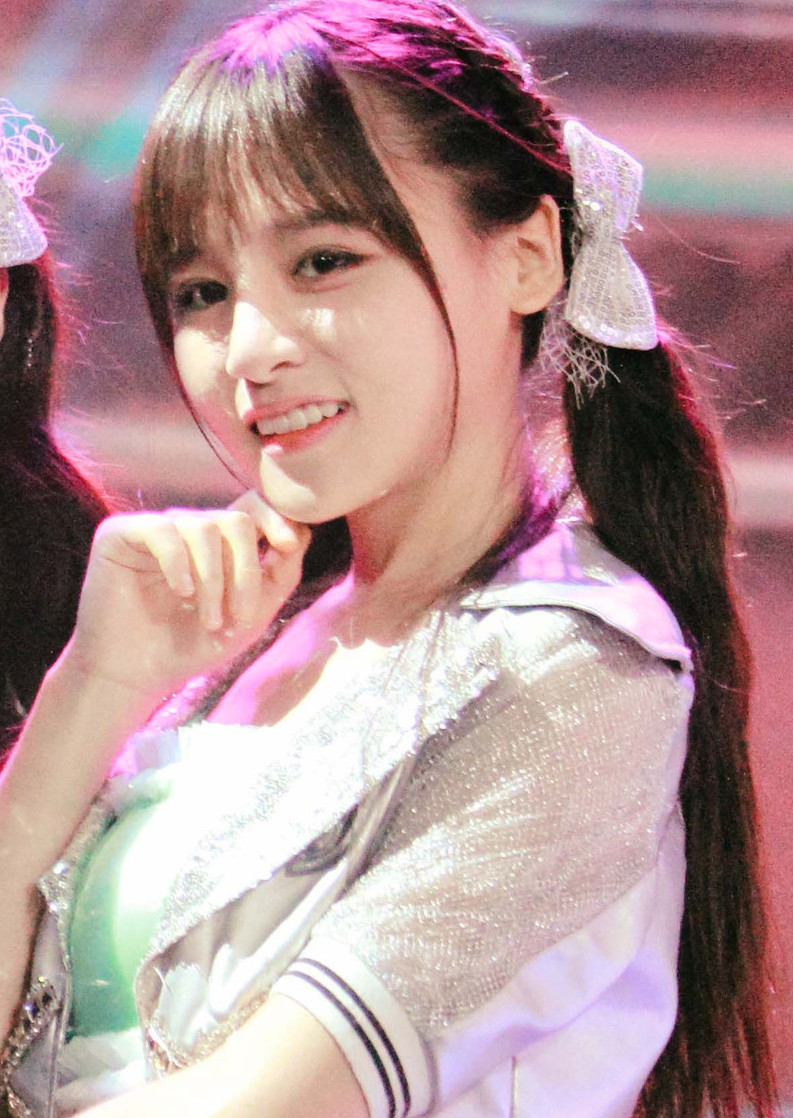
- Zeng Yanfen in 2015.
- Born: January 30, 1991 (age 35); Shaoguan, Guangdong, China
- Occupations: Singer, actress
- Years active: 2013-present

Chinese name
- Traditional Chinese: 曾艷芬
- Simplified Chinese: 曾艳芬
Transcriptions
Standard Mandarin
- Hanyu Pinyin: Zēng Yànfēn
- Musical career
- Genres: Pop, Mandopop
- Instruments: Vocals, ukulele
- Labels: Star48; Ninestyle Model Agency; Ninestyle Music
- Formerly of: SNH48
- Website: www.zengyf.com (Archived)

Zeng Yanfen (simplified Chinese: 曾艳芬; traditional Chinese: 曾艷芬; pinyin: Zēng Yànfēn; born January 30, 1991, in Shaoguan, Guangdong, China) is a Chinese idol singer and actress. She was a member of Team NII of SNH48, a Chinese idol girl group in Shanghai, China.

== Biography ==
=== 2013-2015: Early career, debut ===
On August 18, 2013, Zeng was selected to be one of the 34 qualified members of the 2nd generation members of SNH48. Later, she formally debuted on the Theater no Megami stage. On November 11, she attended the SNH48 Team establishment flag presentation ceremony, and became a member of Team NII.

On November 16, she attended the SNH48 Guangzhou Concert, and on December 31, she attended Dragon TV 1314 Countdown.

On January 18, 2014, Zeng attended the Red vs White Concert. On February 23, she was among the SNH48 members who participated in the fifth season of China's Got Talent. On May 5, she was invited to attend the release conference of the FM101 Brightness 2014. On July 26, she attended the 2014 General Election Concert. On July 31, she attended the China Joy performance. On December 27, she attended the tour concert named SNH48 China Star-dream.

=== 2015: Rise in SNH48 ===
On January 15, 2015, the second anniversary EP Give Me Five was issued, and Zeng starred in the music video of the title track. On January 31, she attended the First SNH48 Request Time Best 30 Concert, and performed "Wagamama na Nagareboshi" with Ju Jingyi. On February 17, she attended Jiangsu Television's Spring Festival Gala as one of the 48 members of SNH48. On July 25, she attended the 2015 General Election Concert, and was awarded 9th place. On August 11, she won first place in the Style-7 vote hosted by Le TV. On September 25, she attended the Echo App Stars’ Night Show with Team NII, and became the first generation of spokesman for Echo. On October 31, she attended Style-7's first fashion show, and won fourth place. On November 10, she attended the Tmall Double-11 Evening Party hosted by Hunan Television. On December 4, the variety show she attended, named Assaulting Girls, was broadcast. On December 26, she attended the Second SNH48 Request Time Best 30 Concert. On December 31, she attended Jiangsu Television Countdown Concert.

On January 11, 2016, the SNH48 Theater Annual MVPs were announced. Zeng was awarded the Theater MVP, and she became the first member who won this honor three times in a row. On 30 July 2016, during SNH48's third General Election, Zeng was ranked fourth with 88,656.8 votes.

On 7 January 2017, she participated in SNH48's third Request Time, of which her song "Don't Touch", performed with Ju Jingyi and Zhao Yue, came in first. On February 10, she guest-starred on the variety show Lonely Room. On March 3, she was awarded the Annual Theater MVP for the year 2016, the fourth time in a row. On July 29, during SNH48's fourth General Election, Zeng came in sixth with 111145.9 votes.

== Discography ==
=== With SNH48 ===
==== EPs ====
Year	No.	Title	Type	Notes
2013	2	"Fortune Cookie of Love"	B-side	Debut with SNH48 Team NII
2014	3	"Heart Electric"	B-side	
2014	4	"Mae Shika Mukanee"	B-side	
2014	5	"UZA"	B-side	
2015	6	"Give Me Five!"	A-side	
2015	7	"After Rain"	B-side	
2015	8	"Manatsu no Sounds Good!"	B-side	
2015	9	"Halloween Night"	A-side	Ranked 9th in the 2nd General election
2015	10	"New Year's Bell"	B-side	
2016	11	"Engine of Youth"	B-side	
2016	12	"Dream Land"	B-side	
2016	13	"Princess's Cloak"	A-side	
2016	14	"Happy Wonder World"	A-side	Center
2017	15	"Each Other's Future"	B-side	
2017	16	"Summer Pirates"	B-side	Sang on "Limited season" as part of Team NII
2017	17	"Dawn in Naples"	A-side	

== Units ==
=== Stage units ===
Stage no.	Song	Notes
Team NII 1st Stage "Theater no Megami"	"Locker Room Boy" 更衣室男孩	With Wang Yijun, Huang Tingting, Xu Yanyu and Luo Lan
Team NII 2nd Stage "Saka Agari"	"Ai no Iro" 爱的颜色	With Huang Tingting, Lin Siyi, Dong Yanyun, Yi Jia'ai and Tang Anqi
Team NII 3rd Stage "Mokugekisha"	"Hoshi no Mukougawa" 星的彼岸	With Wan Lina, Xu Yanyu and Lu Ting
Team NII 4th Stage "Boku no Taiyou"	"Idol Nante Yobanaide" 专属偶像	With Wan Lina, Tang Anqi and Zhang Yuxin
Team NII 5th Stage "Exclusive Party"	"We're not Angels" 我们不是天使	With Yi Jia'ai and Wan Lina

=== Concert units ===
Year	Date	Name	Song	Notes
2013	16 November	Guangzhou Concert	None	
2014	18 January	Red and White Concert	None	
2014	26 July	SNH48 Sousenkyo Concert in Shanghai	None	
2015	31 January	Request Hour Setlist Best 30 2015	"Wagamama na Nagareboshi" 任性的流星	With Ju Jingyi
2015	25 July	2nd General Election Concert	None	
2015	26 December	Request Hour Setlist Best 30 2015 (2nd Edition)	None	
2016	30 July	3rd General Election Concert	"Zannen Shoujo" 残念少女	With Yi Jia'ai
2017	7 January	Request Hour Setlist Best 50 (3rd Edition)	"Lay down" 女王殿下 "Wimbledon e Tsureteitte" 温布顿之梦 "Don't Touch"	Solo song With Yan Jiaojin and Wang Shu; With Ju Jingyi and Zhao Yue

== Filmography ==
=== Movies ===
Year	Title	Role	Notes
2017	深宫蜜语	Shen Zhaoxue 沈昭雪	

=== TV series ===
Year	Title	Role	Notes
2019	Cheat My Boss	Xiao Koumei 小扣妹	
2019	The Deep Palace Honey		

=== Variety shows ===
Year	Date	Channel	Title	Notes
2013	15 December - 2 February	Dragon Television	China's Got Talent	
2014	20 February	TV Asahi Online	Shang High School 48 上海学院48	
2014	4 July	Tudou, Youku	SNHello	
2014	1 December	Auto Fun Channel	男辕北辙	
2015	27 June	AcFun	Blossom Girls 周刊少女SNH48	
2015	13 July	KanKan News	语录	With Li Yitong, Feng Xinduo and Yi Jia'ai
2015	28 July	QQLive	Running Mei 进击的女生	
2015	31 October	Dragon Television	Tonight 80's Talk Show 今晚80后脱口秀	
2015	4 December	Youku	You Show 优叻个秀	
2015	4 December	Hunan Television	Day Day Up 天天向上	
2016	8 January	Jiangsu Television	The Brain 最强大脑	
2016	10 January	CCTV-1	I Want to Perform in Chinese New Year Gala 我要上春晚	
2016	10 January - 4 April	Tudou, Youku	National Girl 国民美少女	
2016	6 March-15 May	Zhejiang Television	Hidden Singer 谁是大歌神	With Li Yitong and Sun Rui
2016	21 May	Gansu TV	再见吧！烦恼	Ep. 3, 4
2016	21 June	iQiyi	College Talk 大学生来了	With Ju Jingyi, Mo Han and Li Yuqi
2016	17 August	Hunan Television	I Am A Great Beauty 我是大美人	
2016	10 September	Hunan Television	Happy Camp 快乐大本营	With Top 16
2016	28 October	NetEase	Yo! Idol 哟！爱豆	With Huang Tingting, Zhao Yue and Wan Lina
2016	14 November-	Tencent	Mad Ear 耳边疯	
2016	24 November	Sohu	The Amazing Idol 抱走吧！爱豆	With Huang Tingting, Wan Lina, Yi Jia'ai, Duan Yixuan, Sun Shan and Niu Congcong
2017	3 January	Hunan Television	I Am A Great Beauty 我是大美人	
2017	22 February	Youku	Lonely Room 空房间	
2017	21 May	ChinaBlue TV	厉害了我滴星	
2017	28 June	Youku	Brain Boom 脑洞大开	
2017	28 June	Shanghai Media Group, Tencent	就匠变新家	With Lu Ting
