= Zhang Yuxi =

Chinese actress (born 1991)

Zhang Yuxi 张予曦
- Zhang Yuxi in 2026
- Born: January 30, 1993 (age 33); Dunhua, Jilin, China
- Other names: Yci Zhang, Rayli Zhang, Xixi
- Education: Beijing Institute of Fashion Technology
- Occupations: Actress; model
- Years active: 2013–present
- Agent(s): H&R Century Pictures
- Height: 168 cm (5 ft 6 in)
- Partner: Kenji Chen (2016-2019)

Chinese name
- Chinese: 张予曦
Transcriptions
Standard Mandarin
- Hanyu Pinyin: Zhāng Yǔ Xī

Zhang Yuxi (Chinese: 张予曦), also known as Yci, is a Chinese actress. She is known for her roles as Lin Xingchen in the romance comedy drama My Little Princess (2016), Chu Linglong in Love and Redemption (2020), Zhu Jiu in South Wind Knows (2023), Qin Fei in A Beautiful Lie (2024) and Ye Meng in Deep Affection Eyes (2025).

== Career ==
In 2009, Zhang won the championship in the Rayli Kanebo Beauty Competition.

In 2013, Zhang made her acting debut in the historical drama Man Comes to Tang Dynasty . She then starred in the wuxia film The Taking of Tiger Mountain and youth romance film Forever Young.

In 2016, Zhang became known for her role in the romance comedy drama My Little Princess; and its sequel Dear Prince. Zhang then starred in both installments of the fantasy romance drama I Cannot Hug You and received increased recognition.

In 2018, Zhang made a brief appearance in the historical palace drama Ruyi's Royal Love in the Palace, portraying a famed courtesan.

In 2019, Zhang starred in the period suspense drama Please Give Me a Pair of Wings. She was cast in the fantasy romance film White Fish Girl, part of the Liao Zhai film series produced by Dongfang Feiyun.

In 2020, Zhang starred in the romance drama Intense Love as the female lead. The same year, she starred in the xianxia romance drama Love and Redemption.

In 2021, Zhang starred in drama Stand By Me.

== Personal Life ==
In 2016, Zhang met and fell in love with her My Little Princess co-star Kenji Chen. They started dating in the summer, shortly after filming of the series wrapped, and mutually announced their relationship on Weibo in February 2017 through posts filled with intimate photos. In August 2019, after intense media speculation, they confirmed they had broken up, with Zhang stating about their time together: "It is a beautiful thing that I have been so lucky. I was given the chance to be happy. The journey is more precious to me than the ending." Chen responded: "Thank you for so many sweet moments. Journeying through so many stops together... When your companion gets out of the car, it turns to gratitude, even if it's very difficult."

== Filmography ==
=== Film ===
Year	English title	Chinese title	Role	Notes	Ref.
2014	The Taking of Tiger Mountain	智取威虎山3D	June		
2015	Forever Young	栀子花开	Xia Jingjing		
2015	Qing Chun Wei Yang	青春未央	Li Jia		
2016	The New Year's Eve of Old Lee	过年好	Driver		
2016	Money and Love	恭喜发财之谈钱说爱	Li Xin		
2020	The Beauty Skin	美人皮	Lian Cheng		
2020	Mermaid Bound	人鱼缚	Bai Qiulian		
2020	Enormous Legendary Fish	海大鱼	A Li		
2021	Fairy Dance	七月的舞步	Gu Youyou		

=== Television series ===
Year	English title	Chinese title	Role	Network	Notes/Ref.
2008	Armor Hero: Legend of Light and Shadow	铠甲勇士	Hacker (Cameo)	Armor Hero	
2013	Man Comes to Tang Dynasty	唐朝好男人	Er Nu	LeTV	
2016	My Little Princess	亲爱的公主病	Lin Xingchen	Sohu TV	Lead role
2017	Magic Star	奇星记之鲜衣怒马少年时	Chen Jieya	Youku	
2017	Dear Prince	亲爱的王子大人	Sun Xiaotao	Mango TV, Youku, Sohu TV	
2017	I Cannot Hug You	无法拥抱的你	Li Shiya	Sohu TV	
2017	Die Now	端脑	Liu Yiya	Sohu TV	
2018	I Cannot Hug You 2	无法拥抱的你第二季	Li Shiya	Sohu TV	
2018	Ruyi's Royal Love in the Palace	如懿传	Shui Linglong	Tencent	
2019	Please Give Me a Pair of Wings	请赐我一双翅膀	Leng Nianzhi	Tencent	
2020	Intense Love	韫色过浓	Su Jinbei	Mango TV	
2020	Love and Redemption	琉璃	Chu Linglong	Mango TV, Youku	Support role
2020	My Unicorn Girl	穿盔甲的少女	Chen Miaomiao	iQIYI	Cameo
2021	Stand by Me	与君歌	Cheng Ruoyu	Mango TV	
2021	Love at Night	夜色暗涌时	Xu Qingyou	Mango TV	
2023	South Wind Knows	南风知我意	Zhu Jiu	Youku	
2024	Guess Who I Am	猜猜我是谁	Song Yao	Youku	
2024	Hero Is Back	镇魂街之热血再燃	Xia Ling	Youku	Support role
2024	A Beautiful Lie	你的谎言也动听	Qin Fei	iQIYI	
2024	The Land of Warriors	斗罗大陆之燃魂战	Xiao Wu	Viki, Tencent	
2024	The Top Speed	奔跑吧，医生	Sun Jia Qi	CCTV, iQIYI, Tencent	
2025	Kill My Sins	掌心	Ni Chang	Viki, Youku	Support role
2025	Destiny and Saving	千秋令	Feng Li Xue / Wu Chen / Ni Huang	Mango TV	
2025	Deep Affection Eyes	深情眼	Ye Meng	Hunan TV, Mango TV	
TBA	Hard Memory: Prisoner Under Fire	空气的囚徒	An Ni		
TBA	Zhao Zhao Adventures	雨霖铃	Zhang Yueshi	CCTV-8, Youku	Support role

=== Variety show – TV show ===
Name	Day	Role
Day Up Day	2011	Main
Laugh Out Loud	18 June 2015	Cast
Happy Camp	4 July 2015	Cast
Flying Man	19 July 2015	Main
Fresh Man	31 October 2015	Cast
We Love Home	28 December 2015	Cast
Mars – Season 1	2017	Main
The Amazing Orcs	25 November 2017	Cast
Very quiet distance	6 September 2018	Cast
Happy Camp	27 October 2018	Cast
Hearable food 2	5 June 2020	Cast
Supernova game	12 October 2019	Cast
A Le's Morning Reading Moments	5 June 2020	DJ, narrator of "To the Oak"
Beauty Box 闺蜜好美	14 June 2020	Cast
Crazy Magic 7	19 June 2020	Cast
Happy Camp	28 August 2021	Cast
The Irresistible Season 2	4 September 2021	Cast ep 8

=== Theater ===
- Zhi Yin Dan Sheng Zai Yi Qi (只因单身在一起)

== Discography ==
Year	English title	Chinese title	Album	Notes/Ref.
2016	"Dear Princess"	亲爱的公主	My Little Princess OST	
2020	"Already In Love"	早就心动了	Intense Love OST	with Ding Yuxi
2020	"With You"	陪你	Intense Love OST	
2020	"Spring Night"	春意晚		
2021	"High Above in the Sky"	當空	Stand By Me OST	
2021	"In Time"	合乎时宜		

== Business ==
Since 2017, she started to set up her own stores and business brands. Initially, all the brands used the same name Eifair Lab to produce many products, then split up.

- Bedding shop Yci La Maision]
- Brand – fashion store StyleNotes:
- Cosmetic brand EGOCI

== Awards and nominations ==
Year	Award	Category	Nominated work	Result	Ref.
2009	Kaneboo	Rayli's Magazine cover girl		Won	
2016	Rayli Beauty Fans Award Ceremony	Breakthrough Newcomer		Won	
2016	Sohu Fashion Awards	Best Web Series Actress	My Little Princess	Won	
2017	Rayli Fans Awards	Female artist with the best fashion		Won	
2018	ifeng Fashion Choice Awards	Most Popular Newcomer		Won	
2018	All For Life Charity Award Ceremony	Charity Award		Won	
2021	8th Wenrong Awards	Best Young Actress	Intense Love	Nominated	
