= Xu Jiaqi =

Chinese singer

Kiki Xu Jiaqi
- 许佳琪
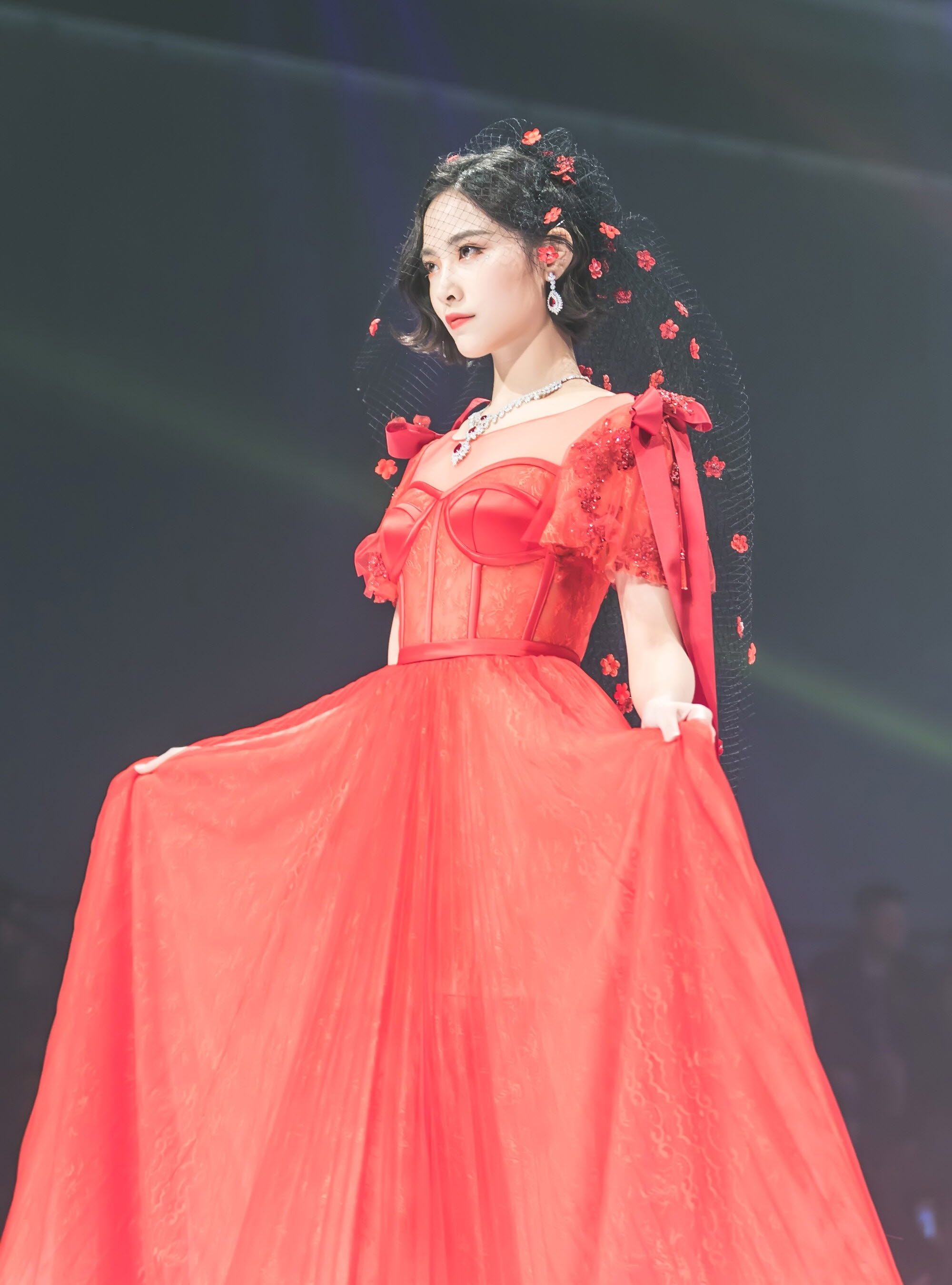
- Xu in 2017
- Born: Xu Jiaqi; August 27, 1995 (age 31); Linhai, Zhejiang, China
- Other names: Kiki Xu; Kiki
- Education: Shanghai Film Art Academy
- Occupations: Singer; rapper; dancer; actress
- Musical career
- Genres: Pop; Mandopop; K-pop; J-pop
- Instrument: Vocals
- Years active: 2013–present
- Labels: Star48; Ninestyle Model Agency; Ninestyle Music; ADQC (Note: As a member of The9 only.); iQiyi
- Formerly of: SNH48; Style-7; 7Senses; The9

Chinese name
- Traditional Chinese: 許佳琪
- Simplified Chinese: 许佳琪
Transcriptions
Standard Mandarin
- Hanyu Pinyin: Xǔ Jiāqí

Xu Jiaqi (Chinese: 许佳琪; born August 27, 1995) is a Chinese singer, rapper, dancer, songwriter, and actress. She was a member of Team SII of the female idol group SNH48 as well as its sub-units Style-7 and 7Senses, and she was also a member of the temporary girl group, The9. In 2020, she participated in Youth with You 2 and got 3rd place, securing her place in The9. She is also known for her role in the television series Legend of Yunxi (2018) as well as her leading role in The Blooms at Ruyi Pavilion (2020) as Fu Xuan.

== Early life ==
Xu was born on August 27, 1995, in Linhai, Taizhou, Zhejiang, China. She graduated from Shanghai Film Art Academy and Shanghai Normal University.

== Career ==
=== 2012–2020: SNH48 and acting debut ===
On 14 October 2012, during an SNH48 press conference, Xu was announced as one of the first-generation members of SNH48.

On 25 May 2013, Xu performed at the "Blooming For You" Concert. On 11 November, she was promoted to SNH48 Team SII, and on 12 December, she starred in SNH48's first documentary, "MengXiang YuBei Sheng". On 16 December, she performed at the SNH48 Guangzhou Concert.

On 18 January 2014, Xu participated in the Red and White Concert, of which Team SII emerged as the winner. On 26 July, during SNH48's first General Election, Xu came in eighth with 7256 votes, subsequently becoming part of the Senbatsu for their fifth single.

On 31 January 2015, Xu performed at SNH48 Request Hour Setlist Best 30 2015. On 25 July, during SNH48's second General Election, she came in 20th with 14351.7 votes and was placed among the Under Girls. On 31 October, Xu came in first during SNH48's first Fashion Awards and became part of SNH48's sub-unit Style-7.

In 2016, it was announced that Xu would star in the film Catman together with bandmate Ju Jingyi, due to be released in 2017. Xu made her acting debut with a cameo on the drama Stairway to Stardom. On 30 July, during SNH48's third General Election, Xu was ranked 11th with 27,388.8 votes. On 5 November, she came in first during SNH48's second Fashion Awards. On March 19, Xu was announced as one of the members of SNH48's sub-unit 7SENSES. They released their first EP, "7SENSES" on April 20. On July 29, during SNH48's fourth General Election, Xu came in tenth with 54678.8 votes.

Xu played a supporting role in the historical romance drama Legend of Yunxi in 2018. In addition, on July 28, 2018, Xu came in 7th with 91,582.06 votes during SNH48's fifth General Election.

On July 29, 2019, during SNH48's sixth General Election, Xu maintained her ranking and came in 7th with 839,586 votes.

On October 14, 2020, Xu graduated alongside the other remaining first-generation members of SNH48. October 12 marked 8 years since SNH48's formation.

=== 2020–present: Youth With You 2, The9 and solo activities ===
Xu participated on the reality girl group survival show Youth With You 2, which was aired on March 12, 2020. Xu is set to star in the dramas The Blooms at Ruyi Pavilion and Lost Parallel.

On May 30, 2020, in the finale of Youth With You 2, Xu placed 3rd with 9,086,752 votes, thus earning a coveted spot in the final ground group, The9.

After the competition, she has done several solo endeavors such as fashion shows, magazine shootings and commercial shootings. She released a special fan song for her fandom (Blackis) called "Stand by Me". She also landed 2 main roles notably in The Blooms at Ruyi Pavilion alongside Ju Jingyi with Wang Youshuo as her male lead.

The9 disbanded on December 5, 2021.

== Public image ==
Xu has been referred to as "short-hair Chinese Goddess" by Chinese and South Korean fans and media since her South Korea debut with 7Senses in 2019.

== Discography ==
=== Singles ===
| Title | Year | Peak chart position | | Album |
| Title | Year | CHN (Note: The Billboard China Top 100 was launched in January 2019 by Billboard China and was last updated in September 2019.) | TWN | Album |
As lead artist
| "Spy" (with Wu Zhehan) | 2019 | — | — | Our Journey |
| "Stand By Me" | 2020 | — | — | Non-album single |
| "Fox" | 2020 | — | — | Non-album single |
| "SKIN" (Note: Song was released under The9, but a solo released by Xu Jiaqi.) | 2020 | — | — | MatriX |
Soundtrack appearances
| "Fate Ends in the World" (缘尽世间) (with Ju Jingyi and Zhao Jiamin) | 2015 | — | — | Mo Tian Ji OST |
| "闪电起航" (with Liu Xiang, Tian Liang, Chen Linong, Silence Wang and Yumiko Cheng) | 2020 | — | — | XJR Sports Carnival OST |
| "意浓" | 2020 | — | — | The Blooms at Ruyi Pavilion OST |
| "Poison Kandy (魅)" | 2021 | — | — | Non-album single |
"—" denotes releases that did not chart or were not released in that region.

=== Idol Producer (Season 2) ===
| Song | Original Artist | Notes |
|---|---|---|
| The Eve (破风) | EXO | Mission 1: Position Evaluation, Center |
| R&B All Night | KnowKnow, Higher Brothers | Mission 2: Group Battle, Center |
| MAMA - Chinese Version | EXO | Group Revenge, Center |
| Non Daily Revelry (非日常狂欢) | Bunches Honey Ha! (with Jin Zihan, Kong Xue'er, Xie Keyin, Sun Rui, Yu Shuxin, Zhao Xiaotang) | Mission 3: Theme Song Assessment, Lead Dancer |
| Lover (情人) | Cai Xukun | Mission 4: Cooperation Stage, Lead Dancer |
| Hunt (猎) | Xu Jiaqi, Yu Shuxin, An Qi, Sun Rui, Zhao Xiaotang, Lu Keran, Dai Yanni, Xu Ziyin, Jin Zihan, Liu Lingzi | Mission 5: Final Stage Performance, Center & Rapper 1 |

== Filmography ==
=== Film ===
| Year | Title | | Role | Notes | Ref. |
| Year | English | Original | Role | Notes | Ref. |
|---|---|---|---|---|---|
| 2013 | | 梦想预备生之半熟少女 | Herself | | |
| 2015 | MoTian Jie | 魔天劫 | Ye Tianmei 叶天眉 | | |
| 2015 | Love, At First | 爱之初体验 | Herself | Cameo | |
| 2016 | I Shall Seal the Heavens | 我欲封天 | Meng Hao 孟浩 | | |
| 2019 | Comic Girl Squad | 暴走萌妹特攻队 | Decimal / Xiao Shu / Zhou Luo | | |
| 2021 | Catman | 我爱喵星人 | Vivian | | |

=== Television series ===
| Year | Title | | Network | Role | Notes | Ref. |
| Year | English | Original | Network | Role | Notes | Ref. |
|---|---|---|---|---|---|---|
| 2017 | Stairway to Stardom | 逆袭之星途璀璨 | Tencent Video | Song Jiani | Cameo | |
| 2018 | Legend of Yunxi | 芸汐传 | iQiyi | Chu Qingge | Supporting role | |
| 2020 | The Blooms at Ruyi Pavilion | 如意芳霏 | iQiyi | Fu Xuan | Main role | |
| 2020 | Parallel Lost | 平行迷途 | Youku | Liang Xue | Main role | |
| 2021 | The Flowers Are Blooming | 清风朗月花正开 | iQiyi | Chen Langyue | Main role | |
| 2023 | Let's Date, Professor Xie | 爱情，开袋即食 | Tencent Video | Xie Yufei | Main role | |
| 2024 | Burning Love | 胭脂似火 | Sohu TV | Xie Lanqin | Main role | |
| 2024 | Echo of Her Voice | 幻乐森林 | iQiyi | Su Ruofei | Main role | |
| 2024 | The Land of Warriors | 斗罗大陆之燃魂战 | Tencent Video | Hu Liena | Supporting role | |
| 2025 | Legend of The Female General | 錦月如歌 | Tencent Video | Hua Youxian | Guest role | |

=== Television shows ===
| Year | Title | | Network | Role | Notes | Ref. |
| Year | English | Original | Network | Role | Notes | Ref. |
|---|---|---|---|---|---|---|
| 2020 | Youth With You 2 | 青春有你 2 | iQiyi | Contestant | Survival show that determined The9 members Finished 3rd | |
| 2020 | XJR Sports Carnival | 小巨人运动会 | Mango TV | Cast member | | |

== Individual endorsements ==
- Kiss Me (2016)
- Tuhu (2016)
- Skechers China (2018)
- Mclon (2018)
- Shu Uemura (2019)
- Mamonde (2019)
- 花果轻乳 (2020)

== SNH48 activities ==
=== EPs ===
| Year | No. | Title | Role | Notes |
|---|---|---|---|---|
| 2013 | 1 | Heavy Rotation | A-side | Debut with SNH48 Team SII |
| 2013 | 2 | Flying Get | A-side | |
| 2013 | 3 | Fortune Cookie of Love | A-side | Center |
| 2014 | 4 | Heart Electric | B-side | |
| 2014 | 5 | UZA | A-side | |
| 2015 | 6 | Give Me Five! | A-side | |
| 2015 | 7 | After Rain | A-side | |
| 2015 | 8 | Manatsu no Sounds Good! | A-side | |
| 2015 | 9 | Halloween Night | B-side | |
| 2015 | 10 | New Year's Bell | B-side | |
| 2016 | 11 | Engine of Youth | B-side | |
| 2016 | 12 | Dream Land | B-side | |
| 2016 | 13 | Princess's Cloak | A-side | |
| 2016 | 14 | Happy Wonder World | A-side | |
| 2017 | 15 | Each Other's Future | B-side | |
| 2017 | 16 | Summer Pirates | B-side | Sang on "Area 48" as part of Team SII |
| 2017 | 17 | Dawn in Naples | A-side | |
| 2017 | 18 | Sweet Festival | B-side | |
| 2018 | 20 | Forest Theorem | A-side | |
| 2018 | 21 | Endless Story | A-side | |
| 2019 | 23 | Our Journey | B-side | |
| 2019 | 25 | Poetry About Time | A-side | |
| 2019 | 26 | Wings | B-side | |

=== Albums ===
- Mae Shika Mukanee (2014)

=== Units ===
==== SNH48 Stage Units ====
| Stage No. | Song | Notes |
|---|---|---|
| Team SII 1st Stage "Saishuu Bell ga Naru" | Return Match 再爱一回 | With Qian Beiting, Xu Chenchen and Li Yuqi |
| Team SII 2nd Stage "Nagai Hikari" | Heart Gata Virus 心型病毒 | With Kong Xiaoyin and Xu Chenchen |
| Team SII 3rd Stage "Pajama Drive" | Pajama Drive 不眠之夜 | With Li Yuqi and Mo Han |
| Team SII 4th Stage "RESET" | Kokoro no Hashi no Sofa 心端的沙发 | With Wu Zhehan and Sun Rui |
| Team SII 5th Stage "Yume wo Shinaseru Wake ni Ikanai" | Tonari no Banana 青涩的香蕉 | With Zhang Yuge |
| Team SII 6th Stage "Journey of the Heart" | Horizon 地平线 | With Wu Zhehan, Qian Beiting, Shen Zhiling and Kong Xiaoyin |
| Team SII 7th Stage "District 48" | Love Is Not Central 爱未央 | With Xu Daimeng |
| Team SII 7.5th Stage "Beautiful District 48" | Angel's Trap 天使的圈套 | With Sun Rui |
| Team SII 8th Stage "Plan Salvation" | 噩夢輪迴 | Solo stage |

==== Concert units ====
| Year | Date | Name | Song | Notes |
|---|---|---|---|---|
| 2013 | 25 May | Blooming For You Concert | None | |
| 2013 | 16 November | Guangzhou Concert | Return Match 再爱一回 | With Li Yuqi, Mo Han and Chen Guanhui |
| 2014 | 18 January | Red and White Concert | Arashi no Yoru ni wa 暴风雨之夜 | With Chen Si, Dai Meng and Wen Jingjie |
| 2014 | 26 July | SNH48 Sousenkyo Concert in Shanghai | None | |
| 2015 | 31 January | Request Hour Setlist Best 30 2015 | Heart Gata Virus 心型病毒; Pajama Drive 不眠之夜; Our Destiny in This World | With Wen Jingjie and Xu Zixuan; With Mo Han and Li Yuqi; With Zhao Jiamin and Ju Jingyi |
| 2015 | 25 July | 2nd General Election Concert | Dakishimeraretara 如果你拥抱我 | With Dai Meng and Kong Xiaoyin |
| 2015 | 26 December | Request Hour Setlist Best 30 2015 (2nd Edition) | Junjou Shugi 纯情主义 | With Yuan Yuzhen and Xu Han |
| 2016 | 30 July | 3rd General Election Concert | None | |
| 2017 | 7 January | Request Hour Setlist Best 50 (3rd Edition) | Enjou Rousen 燃烧的道路; Kiseki wa Ma ni Awanai 错过奇迹 | With Liu Jiongran and Qing Yuwen |
| 2017 | 4th General Election Concert | 29 July | Monster | With Zhang Yuge, Liu Jiongran, Wan Lina and Zhang Dansan |
| 2018 | Request Hour Setlist Best 50 (3rd Edition) | 3 February | Night Butterfly 夜蝶 | With Wu Zhehan |
| 2018 | 5th General Election Concert | 28 July | 夜行的黑猫 | With Lu Ting and Kong Xiaoyin |
| 2019 | Request Hour Setlist Best 50 (5th Edition) | 19 January | Don't Touch | Solo |
| 2019 | Request Hour Setlist Best 50 (5th Edition) | 19 January | Spy | With Wu Zhehan |
| 2019 | 6th General Election Concert | 27 July | Pink Sniper | With Lin Siyi and Xie Leilei |
| 2019 | Request Hour Setlist Best 50 (6th Edition) | 21 December | 废墟纪元 | Solo |
| 2019 | Request Hour Setlist Best 50 (6th Edition) | 21 December | +- | With Wu Zhehan |
| 2019 | Request Hour Setlist Best 50 (6th Edition) | 21 December | 美杜莎的温柔 | With Wu Zhehan |
