= Legend of Yunxi =

Chinese television series

- Drama poster
- Genre: Historical fiction; Romance
- Based on: Poison Genius Consort by Jie Mo
- Written by: Jin Yuanyuan
- Directed by: Lin Jianlong; Liu Zhenming
- Starring: Ju Jingyi; Zhang Zhehan; Merxat
- Country of origin: China
- Original language: Mandarin
- No. of seasons: 1
- No. of episodes: 48 + 2 (epilogue)

Production
- Executive producer: Lin Guohua
- Producers: Wang Zijie; Liu Jiacheng
- Production location: Hengdian World Studios
- Running time: 45 mins
- Production companies: Shanghai Star 48 Culture and Media Group; iQiyi

Original release
- Network: iQiyi
- Release: June 25 – August 15, 2018

Legend of Yunxi (Chinese: 芸汐传) is a 2018 Chinese television series based on the novel Poison Genius Consort (Chinese: 天才小毒妃) by Jie Mo. It stars Ju Jingyi in the title role, alongside Zhang Zhehan and Merxat. The series airs on iQIYI from June 25 to August 15, 2018 for 48 episodes. Due to its success, an additional 2 episodes was added nearing the series' finale.

== Synopsis ==
The story takes place during a chaotic time when the land has split into three kingdoms - Tian Ning, Western Qiu and Northern Li. The Emperor of Tian Ning is cunning and distrustful, and fears his own brother Long Feiye will rebel against him. To dampen his spirits, the King arranges for Long Feiye to be married to a woman with a scarred face named Han Yunxi.

Han Yunxi is actually a beautiful, kind, and talented woman who comes from a medical family and is exceedingly skilled at detoxifying poisons. She is forced into obeying the decree of the king and becomes Long Feiye’s wife in name only. The empress dowager of Tian Ning forces Yunxi to be a spy for her in exchange for Yunxi’s mother, who disappeared years ago. Circumstances allow her to show off her skills time and again, winning the admiration of Long Feiye. The two slowly develop feelings for each other. At the same time, she also forms a friendship with Gu Qishao, an adversary of Long Feiye.

== Cast ==
=== Main ===
Actor	Character	Introduction
Ju Jingyi	Han Yunxi (韩芸汐)	Eldest daughter of the Han Manor. Consort of Long Feiye. She has a kind and cheery disposition despite being constantly bullied for her ugly looks. She later acquires a magical bracelet which allowed her to gain extensive knowledge about the properties of different poisons. She was later revealed to be the daughter of the Poison Master.
Zhang Zhehan	Long Feiye (龙非夜)	Prince Qin. His actual identity is the Crown Prince of Western Qin, a fallen dynasty. He is also a "poison puppet". A strategic, intelligent and a powerful man, he often puts up a wall to keep others out. He has never experienced emotional warmth until he met Han Yunxi.
Merxat	Gu Qishao (顾七少)	Master of Yao Gui Valley. Prince of Northern Li. Because of his lowly background, he faced neglect and discrimination in the past. He is merciless and has no qualms about using his special skill set to harm anyone in Tian Ning except Han Yunxi, whom he falls in love with.

=== Supporting ===
==== Tian Ning Palace ====
Actor	Character	Introduction
Zhang Ruijia	Empress Dowager (太后)	Empress Dowager of Tian Ning. She views Long Feiye as a threat and threatens Han Yunxi with her mother's life in order to get her to find out his true identity.
Hu Bing	Emperor Tian Wei (天徽帝)	Emperor of Tian Ning. He is cunning and distrustful, especially of his brother, Long Feiye. He is also responsible for the creation of "poison puppets", indirectly causing the demise of Western Qin and Long Feiye's plight. Despite his cruel nature, he truly loves Chu Qingge.
Xu Jiaqi (SNH48)	Chu Qingge (楚清歌)	Princess of Western Qiu, later Royal Consort Qing. She married the Emperor of Tian Ning in order to seek revenge for her fallen country, but slowly falls in love with him.
Chen Xiufeng	Noble Consort Xiao (萧贵妃)	Mother of Long Tianqing. She was the Emperor's favorite consort till Chu Qingge came along, causing her to be jealous and led to her futile attempts to frame Chu Qingge.
Gao Xiong	Royal Uncle (国舅)	Brother of the former Empress. He assists the Crown prince in gaining power among the court.
Sun Zihang	Long Tianmo (龙天墨)	Crown prince. A naive and foolish man who is easily manipulated by others.
Ge Yangxi	Long Tianqing (龙天青)	Second prince. A haughty and scheming man.
Liu Qinshan	Long Changbing (龙长冰)	Princess of Tian Ning. A spoilt and unruly woman who is doted on by the Emperor. She is in love with Mu Qingwu.
Chen Jingyu	Li Quan (李权)	Head eunuch. He assists the Emperor in creating poison puppets.
Huang Ying	Li Momo (李嬷嬷)	Empress Dowager's personal servant.
Lin Yushu	Lin Momo (林嬷嬷)	Chu Qingge's personal servant.
Sunsu Mengxi	Lü Meng (绿萝)	A palace maid serving Princess Changbing.

==== Qin manor ====
Actor	Character	Introduction
Tan Limin	Grand Imperial Consort Yi (宜太妃)	Adoptive mother of Long Feiye (mother of the real Prince Qin). Her son was framed and died in a fire as a young child. She is very protective of her son and wants him to pair up with Mingxiang (her niece). She slowly starts to like Yunxi because she wants her son to be happy.
Wang Youshuo	Tang Li (唐离)	A descendant of Western Qin. Long Feiye's younger brother. Young master of Tang Sect, he reprociates Ningjing's love for him near the end of series.
Lin Siyi (SNH48)	Ouyang Ningjing (欧阳宁静)	Young mistress of Yun Kong Academy. She likes Tang Li since young, and follows him around wherever he goes.
Zhao Yixin	Chu Xifeng (楚西风)	Long Feiye's loyal guard. He likes Zhu Yu.
Feng Qinuo	Aunt Gui (桂嬷嬷)	Consort Yi's personal attendant.
Jia Shuyi	Zhao Momo (赵嬷嬷)	Long Feiye's personal attendant.

==== Han manor ====
Actor	Character	Introduction
Lu Xingyu	Han Congan (韩从安)	Head of Han manor. Chief imperial physician. Han Yunxi's adoptive father. He pretends to be cold and curt to Yunxi in order to prevent Yunxi from being bullied. He is also responsible for poisoning Yunxi and causing the scar on her face, due to a promise he made with Tian Xin to keep her profile low and protect her.
Tong Tong	Madame Xu (徐夫人)	Second madame of Han family. Han Ruoxue's birth mother. She hates Han Yunxi due to her mother's sudden appearance in the Han manor, causing her to be demoted in rank.
Shangguan Tong	Third madame (三姨娘)	Third madame of Han family. Han Yunyi's birth mother. She has a close relationship with Han Yunxi and treats her as her own.
Liu Jiongran (CKG48)	Han Ruoxue (韩若雪)	Second daughter of the Han Manor. A spoiled and insolent lady who bullies Han Yunxi since young. She has an unrequited admiration for Long Feiye.
Jin Xiangdong	Han Yunyi (韩云逸)	Young master of Han family. He is close to Han Yunxi.

==== Yao Gui Valley ====
Actor	Character	Introduction
Xie Leilei (GNZ48)	Bai Su (白苏)	Gu Qishao's loyal subordinate.
Huang Lulu	Yu Ze (雨泽)	A courtesan who secretly works for Gu Qishao, and is in love with him.
Li Shuting	Zhu Yu (茱萸)	Gu Qishao's loyal subordinate. She likes Chu Xifeng.

==== Others ====
Actor	Character	Introduction
Shao Xuecong (SNH48)	Baili Mingxiang (百里茗香)	Daughter of General Baili. Long Feiye's childhood friend, who has an unrequited crush on him. She spent nearly a decade cultivating a type of antidote called "beauty's blood" in her body in order to save Long Feiye and cure him of his status as a puppet master.
Li Yaoquan	Bai Yanqing (白彦青)	The Poison Master. Han Yunxi's birth father and Gu Beiyue's teacher. Due to his talent and passion for studying poisons he was used by the Emperor to create the puppet monsters.
Zhou Ruijun	Lady Tianxin (天心夫人)	Han Yunxi's birth mother. Bai Yanqing's former wife She left Bai Yanqing after realizing her husband was responsible for the creation of puppet monsters and ended up marrying Han Congan. She eventually died saving Long Feiye.
Li Ruichao	Gu Beiyue (顾北月)	A royal physician. Descendant of Ying tribe, Bai Yanqing's disciple.
Hu Wenzhe	Jun Yizheng (君亦正)	Crown prince of Northern Li. Descendant of the Black tribe. He hates his brother Gu Qishao and attempted multiple times to harm him.
He Youning	Mu Qingwu (穆清武)	A young general.
Yu Zikuan	Old General Mu (穆老将军)	A general. Mu Qingwu's father.
Mao Fan	Sun Muchu (孙慕初)	Subordinate of Long Feiye.
Chang Sheng	Bai Xiaochuan (白嘯川)	Superintendent of Tian Ning.
Lv Chunseng	Gu Chengze (顾承泽)	Gu Beiyue's father.
Wei Yu	Long Zhenfei (龙振飞)	Previous Emperor of Tian Ning.
Zhan Junlin	Emperor of Northern Li (北厉皇帝)	
Peng Miaomiao	Empress of Western Qin (秦熙皇后)	
Yu Bo	Emperor of Western Qiu (西邱国王)	

== Production ==
The series is directed by Liu Zhenming, with Li Guoyuan acting as the action choreographer, Chen Tongxue as style director and Zhong Zhipeng as artistic director.

The series began filming on July 10, 2017 at Hengdian World Studios and wrapped up filming on October 8, 2017 after 111 days.

== Soundtrack ==
No.	Title	Lyrics	Music	Singers	Length
1.	"Falling Flowers and Mud (落花成泥)" (Opening theme song)	Guode Ziyi	Moming Qimiao	Ju Jingyi
2.	"Sighs of Yunxi (叹云兮)" (Ending theme song)	Guode Ziyi	SHIMA	Ju Jingyi
3.	"Crimson Rouge (胭脂绯红)"	Gan Shija	Hu Qin	Lin Siyi

== Reception ==
The series received much popularity among the audience for its light-hearted and sweet storyline. It was also praised by People's Daily for promoting Chinese culture through beautiful cinematography, costumes and positive character interpretation. As of August 2018, it reached 2.3 billion views online. Due to its success, the production team announced an additional two episodes of epilogue, which will be released on August 15 to coincide with the series' finale.

== Awards and nominations ==
Award	Category	Nominated work	Result	Ref.
Influence of Recreational Responsibilities Awards	Web Drama of the Year		Won	
