= Please Give Me a Pair of Wings =

Chinese television series

- Official poster
- Genre: Period; Suspense
- Directed by: Lai Shuiqing; Guo Jianyong
- Starring: Ju Jingyi; Aaron Yan; Han Dong; Zhang Yuxi; Merxat; Zhu Shengyi
- Country of origin: China
- Original language: Mandarin
- No. of episodes: 60

Production
- Production location: Hengdian World Studios
- Production companies: Dongfang Feiyun International, Beijing Changjiang Culture

Original release
- Network: iQiyi, Tencent Video, Youku

Please Give Me a Pair of Wings (Chinese: 请赐我一双翅膀; pinyin: Qing Ci Wo Yi Shuang Chi Pang) is a 2019 Chinese television series starring Ju Jingyi and Aaron Yan with Han Dong, Zhang Yuxi, Merxat and Zhu Shengyi. It airs on iQiyi, Tencent Video and Youku on July 9, 2019.

== Synopsis ==
Lin Jiuge is the daughter of Shanggu's Police Commissioner who was framed and unjustly imprisoned for killing her father. With the help of young police detective Long Tianyu, she sets out to find the real murderer. It also follows her dream of building an all-girl school to improve the fate of the women and her budding friendship with her female cell-mates.

== Cast ==
=== Main ===
- Ju Jingyi as Lin Jiuge
  - A research graduate and daughter of Shanggu's Police Commissioner.
- Aaron Yan as Long Tianyu
  - Captain of the police detective team. He has an extraordinary talent in criminal investigations and criminal tracking.
- Han Dong as Leng Liwei
  - Adopted son of the Leng family. A key figure of the underworld dealings, he is Leng Shinan's right-hand-man and scapegoat. An observant and reticent man who can see through everything.
- Zhang Yuxi as Leng Nianzhi
  - Young mistress of the Leng family. She has everything except love and happiness. She likes Long Tianyu.
- Merxat as Xiao Linfeng
  - A talented con-artist who is well-versed in chess and different instruments. He later became the Police Warden of the Women's prison.
- Zhu Shengyi as Long Xiangxiang
  - A passionate news reporter. Long Tianyu's younger sister. She likes Xiao Linfeng.

=== Supporting ===
==== People in prison ====
- Qiu Xinzhi as Tang Dezong
  - Head warden of the prison. An idealistic man who wants to make the prison a better place.
- Wang Yitong as Qing Diao
  - "Big bully" of the women prison. A cruel and cold person. She hates Lin Aodong as he was the one who arrested her and caused her child to become an orphan, and uses all means to torture Lin Jiuge.
- Wang Yan as Miao Yufeng
  - "Big sister" of the women prison. Previously the sect leader of Qiankun Martial Arts Halls, she is a well-known figure in the pugilistic world and is known for her uprightness.
- Tao Huimin as Yu Linglong
  - A famous thief known as thousand hands Buddha.
- Yi Qi as Xiao Baicai (Zhao Xiaoya)
  - A timid and weak girl who is always bullied. Lin Jiuge's close friend.
- Di Lin as Da Zhima, Qing Diao's follower.
- Ran Chen as Xiao Lajiao, Qing Diao's follower.
- Zhao Jialin as Head warden.
- Zhang Yi as Yan Min, Police warden. She is strict and sarcastic.
- Zhang Zhiran as Lu Jia, Police warden. She is firm but kind.
- Han Shuo as Zhang San
  - Police warden. A lecher who attempted to rape Lin Jiuge, but was accidentally killed by Lin Jiuge and Xiao Baicai.

==== Others ====
- Tse Kwan-ho as Leng Shinan
  - Head of the Leng household. A customs provincial military commander. He is actually the leader of the underworld world who wields great influence and power.
- Yuan Hua as Mao Jiu
  - A former gambling god. Xiao Linfeng's teacher. He was killed by Yu Damang.
- Guan Zhenhai as Sha Ye, Second head of Sha sect.
- Jiang Kai as Guan Bojun
  - Lin Jiuge's birth father. A man who was framed for killing the mayor and almost committed suicide, but was saved by Lin Aodong. He then adopted a new identity and became an undercover in the crime organization.
- Wang Xin as Feng Guangdao, chief police officer. Long Tianyu's superior.
- Shen Feifan as Wu Sanshi, a policeman. Long Tianyu's assistant.
- Xiu Qing as Lin Aodong, Chief Police Officer. Lin Jiuge's adoptive father; Long Tianyu's mentor.
- Wang Yifan as Ji Zetao, a prosecutor. Long Tianyu's former classmate.
- Zhao Yue as Leng Mengchu, youngest son of the Leng family. Lin Jiuge's fiancee.
- Li Xian as Qiu Xiaoying
- Zhuang Jinghao as Wan Guochao
- Liang Jincheng as Zhang Haisheng
- Zhong Lei as Yu Damang, a man involved with the death of Lin Aodong and framing of Lin Jiuge.
- Chen Baoguo as Sha Feng
- Mao Fan as Lawyer Huangpu
- Xue Bin as Editor Ouyang
- Ge Hao as Ah Hui, a policeman who was killed by Yu Damang.
- Sun Tianxin as Da Bao, a policeman.
- Dai Luyao as Shandong Po
- Long Ni as Xiao Ying
- Lou Shushu as Jin E
- Dong Xuqian as Xiang Nan
- Xu Jin as Xiao Taohong
- Zhang Xinyu as Du Du, Tang Dezong's daughter.
- Min Chunxiao as Long Tianyu's mother.
- Lin Ruoxi as Yue Yue, Feng Guangdao's daughter.
- Shangguan Tong as Feng Guangdao's wife.
- Dan Nisi as Scar face
- Zhao Qiusheng as Hou Zi
- Jiang Xiaolin as Du Yan
- Mao Yazi as Hei Mianshen
- Sun Haoran as Zheng Wen
- Yuan Zhiying as Zheng Wu
- Du Jianqiao as Old Master Miao
- Yang Ziming as Ji Linggui

== Production ==
The series began filming in October 2017, and wrapped up in February 2018.

== Soundtrack ==
No.	Title	Lyrics	Music	Singers	Length
1.	"I Want To Fly (我要飞翔)" (Opening theme song)	Liu Chenye	Luo Gun	Aaron Yan
2.	"By Your Side (在你身边)"	Qing Xiu	Ah Kun, Wang Qiang	Hu Shasha
3.	"A Pair of Wings (一双翅膀)" (Ending theme song)	Liu Chenye	Liu Chenye	Ju Jingyi

== Awards and nominations ==
Award	Category	Nominee	Results	Ref.
Golden Bud - The Fourth Network Film And Television Festival	Best Web Series	Please Give Me a Pair of Wings	Nominated	
Golden Bud - The Fourth Network Film And Television Festival	Best Actress	Ju Jingyi	Nominated	
