= The Blooms at Ruyi Pavilion =

2020 chinese television show

- Traditional Chinese: 如意芳霏
- Simplified Chinese: 如意芳霏
- Literal meaning: The Blooms at Ruyi Pavilion
- Hanyu Pinyin: rú yì fāng fēi
- Genre: Costume drama Romance
- Created by: Xiao Jia Ren
- Based on: Chong Hou Zhi Lu
- Written by: Shen Mu; Duanmu Qiongfang; Wei Wenting; Li Yunhan
- Directed by: Kin-Lung Lam; Tony
- Starring: Ju Jingyi; Zhang Zhehan; Xu Jiaqi; Li Yichang; Gong Beibi; Wang Youshuo
- Composers: Hu Zhen; SHIMA; Xu Yunxiao; Jarek Liu; Zhang Jing; Ah Qin (F.I.R); Zunjing Wang
- Country of origin: China
- Original language: Mandarin
- No. of episodes: 40-44

Production
- Executive producers: Dai Ying; Liu Yiheng
- Producers: Zhang Yan, Yu Ping, Du Xiangyu
- Camera setup: Multi-camera
- Running time: Varies by episode
- Production companies: iQiyi; 丝芭传媒

Original release
- Network: iQiyi
- Release: 21 October – 3 December 2020

The Blooms at Ruyi Pavilion (Chinese: 如意芳霏; pinyin: rú yì fāng fēi) is a 2020 Chinese streaming television series that premiered on iQiyi on 12 October 2020. It tells the story of Fu Rong's prophetic dreams and her relationship with Xu Jin. It is directed by Kin Lung Lam and Tony and features an ensemble cast that includes Ju Jingyi, Zhang Zhehan, Xu Jiaqi, Liu Yichang, Wang Youshuo, and Gong Beibi.

The series was adapted from Xiao Jia Ren's Chong Hou Zhi Lu (宠后之路). 40 episodes are globally available on iq.com.

== Synopsis ==
Fu Rong (played by Ju Jingyi), the daughter of Dayu State Heng Jingling, is strong, intelligent, agile and lively. She was injured in an accident and saw a different life in her dream. She thought it was absurd, but she had one event in her dream. After the case came true, she determined to change her fate to protect her family. Fu Rong also dreamed of being buried under the decree of Duke Su Xu Jin (played by Zhang Zhehan) and as a result was determined to stay away from Duke Su, but the red thread of fate brought them closer and closer. With the emergence of the mysterious organization Ruyi Pavilion, a series of incidents cast a layer of mist on Dayu State. Faced with this situation, Fu Rong and Xu Jin joined hands to experience life and death, and face all kinds of hardships in reality together. At the same time, Duke An (played by Liu Yichang) is also secretly setting up a bigger conspiracy. Faced with the hard-to-change fate and the tricks that followed, could Fu Rong and Xu Jin stick to their original aspirations, solve the puzzle, and finally change their mysterious fate.

== Main cast ==
- Ju Jingyi as Fu Rong
- Zhang Zhehan as Xu Jin
- Xu Jiaqi as Fu Xuan
- Li Yichang as Xu Ping
- Gong Beibi as Liu Ruyi
- Wang Youshuo as Wu Baiqi
