= Haunting Love =

- Directed by: Ting Liang
- Release date: October 30, 2012
- Country: China

Haunting Love[诡爱](2012) is a 2012 Chinese horror film directed by Ting Liang., it tells the story of a famous radio host Xiao Xiao who attempts suicide seven days before marriage, after seeing writer fiancé Li MingXuan (Mingle Lin) and former girlfriend Xu JiaWen (Jeana Ho) in a clandestine love affair.

As the film gradually progresses, the genre shifts from horror into murder-mystery-tragedy. It has a two hour run time.

The film touches on the topic of paranoia schizophrenia, a medical disorder still rarely addressed in Greater China and most Asian societies to this day.

The film also draw many inspirations from Ghost (1990) and The Sixth Sense (1999).

== Plot ==
The story begins with the scene of a blood-drenched bathtub with Xiao Ya's fiancé Ming Xuan and she begin to pick up various pieces of her life. She soon begin to experience a series of strange and unexplained events in her house and life. She soon began to confide in her childhood friend Su Yang (played by Cheng Yi) who cheered her up and told her there is no such things as ghosts. But the haunting visions of her dead fiancé haunt Xiao Ya, doggedly pursuing her and she soon experienced terrifying visions only she was able to see.

Together with her childhood friend, Xiao Ya was supported by a group of her childhood friends and close associates to cope with her recent loss, including Li Ming Xuan's brother Li MingYan (played by Zhang Zhehan) and his girlfriend Shen Meiyi (Anna Key) and former high-school senior turned wealthy businessman Xu Wei (played by Yu Li), it was Xu Wei who supported Xiao Ya by redecorating her home to help her forget the past and move on.

Xiao Ya did her best to move on, she went back to work and invited her friends over for dinner to thank them for their support during her troubles. But the ghosts of her past haunts her, as Jia Wen, the ex-girlfriend of her fiancé, came to ask for Xiao ya's forgiveness at Mei Yi's invitation Ming Yan promptly asked Jia Wen to leave, angrily telling her that she will never be welcomed among them. A tearful Jia Wen pleaded to a clearly upset XiaoYa, who clearly found it hard to forgive the other woman.

She again confided in Su Yang, her childhood friend, who again told her not to take things too seriously and to cheer up, Despite her optimism, Xiao Ya's terrifying visions of her dead fiancé haunts her, and soon she begin seeing out of the corner of her eyes, a little girl carrying a doll with only one eye. Xiao Ya's troubles only began to worsen when JiaWen turned up dead, pursued by a killer dressed in black raincoat.

The police was soon on the case, Xiao Ya was hauled before the police for questioning, but was cleared to leave, a visibly upset MeiYi went to find MingYan, who was out drinking the night JiaWen was found dead.

Xiao Ya confided in Su Yang as to Jia Wen's death and she felt sorry for her, citing she felt JiaWen's apology was genuine and heartfelt, Su Yang wrote her death off, telling Xiao Ya she should not blame herself, if anything, it is merely karma. But XiaoYa remained troubled and soon she was then haunted further by JiaWen's ghost, who visited her while she was swimming, in the ensuing panic attack Xiao Ya felt her leg cramped up, but Xu Wei saved her from drowning. Xu Wei asked Xiao Ya to consider moving out of her house, he said it would not be good for her mental health and suggested she can stay at his place whilst searching for a new one. Xiao Ya said she would consider it.

Meanwhile, MingYan was cleared by the police, seemingly with an alibi, and suspecting JiaWen's death was foul play, decided to investigate her apartment, he broke into her sealed apartment and found a hotel keycard along with a handwritten card for his deceased brother. MingYan took the card to the hotel, who duly informed him the registration for the hotel room (where his brother was cheating with Jia Wen) was in the name of Xu Wei. Angered at the revelation, MingYan confronted Xu Wei just as he was heading out to dinner with Xiao Ya, the two men got into a shuffle but Ming Yan was restrained by the building security guards and Yu Wei drove off.

As Yu Wei picked up Xiao Ya, a man was seen following them as they drove to Yu Wei's mansion. The unidentified man loitered outside the premises as Xu Wei and Xiao Ya have dinner. Xu Wei have always harbored feelings for Xiao Ya, and he intended to propose to her when she received a call from MingYan.

MingYan told Xiao Ya of Xu Wei's involvement on his brother's infidelity, a visibly upset Xiao Ya turned on XuWei, asking him if Ming Yan speaks the truth. Seeing himself caught, Xu Wei confessed his feelings but was rejected. Enraged at her denial, he laid hands on xiaoYa and intended to rape her. But Xiao Ya struggled and managed to free herself, barricading herself inside the washroom. Xu Wei was about to pursue when someone cut the power to his mansion. Seeing an intruder, Xu Wei forget about Xiao Ya but armed himself as he searched for the intruder. But the unseen assailant managed to knife Xu Wei in the back, killing him.

The police soon arrived and rescued Xiao Ya, who under questioning said she remembered little, the police suspected it is the same Raincoat Killer and issued a manhunt for him. Meanwhile, MingYan and MeiYi asked XiaoYa to stay with them as they are worried for her. Xiao Ya's nightmares persisted, and her visions of the dead worsened still. In her nightmares she cried and called for Su Yang to come save her. Seeking closure, Xiao Ya spotted the man who fitted the description of the killer and followed him, he turned out to be a stalker who was obsessed with her, but before the stalker can do her harm, Su Yang appeared and saved her once again.

But XiaoYa confronted him, and demanded to know if he have killed Xu Wei. Su Yang said the man deserved his fate, but admitted nothing. to which point Xiao Ya said he could never lie to her, and asked him to surrender himself to the authorities. They argued, Su Yang refused, saying if he is gone, there will be no one to protect her. Xiao Ya whispered softly, telling SuYang if he refused to do so, she will do it for him.

Unbeknownst to XiaoYa, Ming Yan saw the entire exchange.

Su Yang was never there. Xiao Ya was talking to herself.

Then MingYan asked Mei Yi to grant him access to XiaoYa's office, in the office he found an old book, within it contained an old portrait of Su Yang and Xiao Ya when they were young, with the inscription - [摯愛的蘇陽，無憾的雅] - Truly Beloved Su Yang, Without Regrets, Ya (Xiao Ya). Seeing this as the proof he needs, MingYan went to track down Su Yang's parents, and uncovered the story of Xiao Ya. Meiyi has then been secretly tailing Xiao Ya, but the latter found out and held her hostage.

MingYan managed to catch up to the both of them and convinced Xiao Ya she was mentally unwell and suffering from severe paranoia schizophrenia, jolting her from her delirium by showing her the old portrait of herself and SuYang and reminding her of her past. Unable to come to terms with what she have done, XiaoYa took her own life. Heartbroken, MeiYi and MingYan buried her beside her first and only love, Su Yang.

== Characters ==
The movie features three prominent ghosts.

=== Su Yang/'Su Yang' ===
Su Yang exists in XiaoYa's imagination. She turns to him in times of trouble and uncertainty. He was conjured from her memories when she needed protecting, or when she needed comfort in her loneliness. in the movie, Su Yang was deliberately portrayed to misdirect audiences from the fact that he was not alive.

But subtle hints were dropped; Su Yang only appears in scenes alone with XiaoYa - in the supermarket, in the ice-skating rink, in the car and her apartment when no one else was there. None of XiaoYa's friends or associates ever mentioned him, nor was he in any of the flashbacks, photos or group gatherings. He appeared seemingly out-of-nowhere, and dissipated the same way.

He was always there when XiaoYa needed help; when she was coping with her loss, when she was raped by Xu Wei or when she needed advice or comfort. But 'Su Yang' have a more sinister purpose; he was also her dark side, her mechanism and justification for committing murder. in the movie, we saw 'Su Yang' as the Raincoat Killer stalking JiaWen and pushing her off the ledge, or when 'Su Yang' stabbed Xu Wei to death, or when 'Su Yang' came to rescue her from the stalker. In the big reveal, XiaoYa was in 'Su Yang''s place.

As her condition worsen, XiaoYa began whispering and eventually shouting at 'Su Yang', telling us that she genuinely believe he is apart from her, but when 'Su Yang' said she cannot surrender because in doing so, she is essentially surrendering herself to the authorities because 'I am you, you are me.' Suggesting somehow XiaoYa was aware Su Yang was dead, but she managed to convince herself otherwise.

Su Yang/'Su Yang' played on the symbolism of Yin and Yang, of dark and light, the duality of Su Yang/'Su Yang' was prevalent in the movie.

=== 'Little' Xiao Ya ===
Lost sight in one eye, 'Little' XiaoYa let her hair grew long and obscure a part of her face, she carried a little doll with an eye gouged out. This image returned later in XiaoYa's life as a terrifying specter only she can see in the depth of her delirium. XiaoYa saw her younger self first time as a reflection while she was shopping in the supermarket, when she was ice-skating with 'Su Yang' and in the dream sequence.

=== 'Bloody' JiaWen ===
'Bloody' JiaWen appeared as a horrifying spirit of vengeance, with bloody eyes and bloody wounds suffered in the final moments of her death, she appeared numerous times; once in the swimming pool and another during the bedroom where XiaoYa was sleeping. Initial portrayal of her serve to mislead the audience into thinking this movie is a ghost story as opposed to a murder-mystery.

'Bloody' JiaWen later served as a hint that XiaoYa was the killer prior to the big reveal, that XiaoYa felt guilty for killing her as opposed to Xu Wei, who attempted to rape her.

=== MingXuan ===
MingXuan, XiaoYa's deceased fiancé was not listed as a 'ghost' but merely used primarily as a jump-scare mechanic.
