= Zhang Zhehan =

Chinese actor and singer (born 1991)

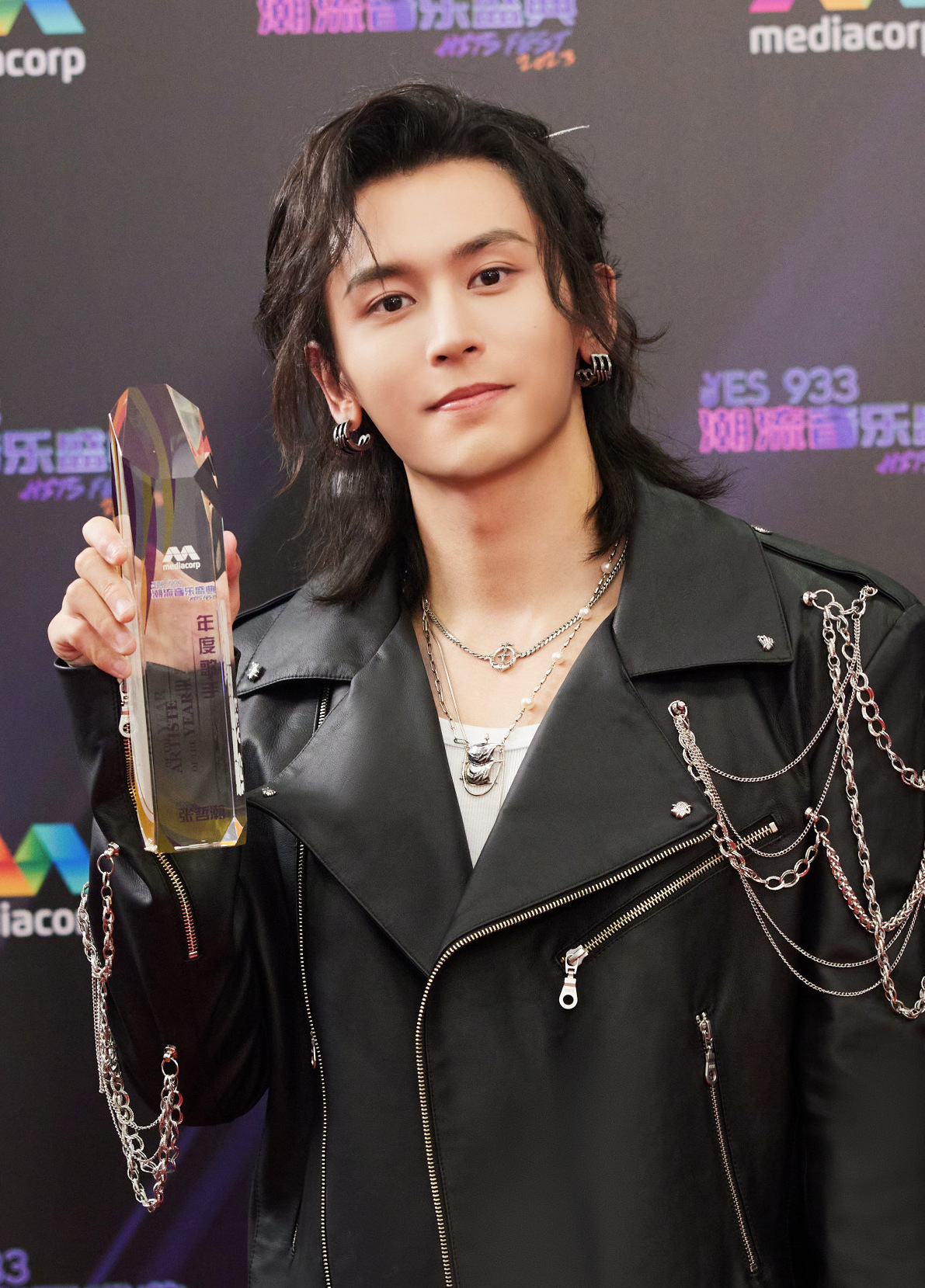
- Zhang in 2023
- Born: May 11, 1991 (age 35); Xinyu, Jiangxi, China
- Other names: Zhang Sanjian (张三坚); Ocean Zhang
- Education: Shanghai Theatre Academy
- Occupations: Actor; singer
- Years active: 2010–present
- Agents: Zhang Zhehan Studio (2019–2021); Huanyu Film (2013–2019); Pulin Production (2019–2021); Ranyi Music (2021–present)
- Height: 181 cm (5 ft 11 in)

Chinese name
- Simplified Chinese: 张哲瀚
Transcriptions

Zhang Zhehan (Chinese: 张哲瀚; born May 11, 1991) is a Chinese actor and singer. He gained attention for his roles in the television series Legend of Ban Shu (2015), Legend of Yunxi (2018), The Blooms at Ruyi Pavilion (2020), and achieved breakout success with Word of Honor (2021). His career was abruptly derailed in August 2021, when photographs taken in 2018 showing him visiting areas near Japan’s Yasukuni Shrine and Nogi Shrine surfaced online, leading to his blacklisting in mainland China. In the aftermath, Zhang shifted his focus toward a music career in overseas markets.

== Early life ==
Zhang was born in Xinyu, Jiangxi province, China on May 11, 1991. He graduated from the Shanghai Theatre Academy.

== Career ==
=== 2010–2021: Early years and breakthrough success ===
In 2010, Zhang made his acting debut in the romantic drama Why Love You. Thereafter, he signed a contract with Yu Zheng's studio, and played the leading role in the comedy web series Crazy for Palace and its sequel. The series gained a small following online.

Zhang then went on to act in various supporting roles in dramas produced by Yu Zheng; such as Palace 3: The Lost Daughter, The Romance of the Condor Heroes and Love Yunge from the Desert. He first gained recognition playing the role of the antagonist in the mystery costume drama Cosmetology High, and went on to portray young Mei Changsu in the acclaimed historical drama Nirvana in Fire.

In 2015, Zhang played the male lead in historical drama Legend of Ban Shu with Jing Tian. He went on to play lead roles in the spy drama Decoded, and headlined both seasons of the fantasy web series Demon Girl. In 2018, Zhang played in the historical romance drama Legend of Yunxi alongside Ju Jingyi. The series received much praise for its storyline. In 2019, Zhang performed in the disaster film The Bravest as a firefighter. He starred as Wang Yue in the short film Brother, which was directed by Vicky Zhao. He has also appeared as a regular member in the variety show Everybody Standby.

In 2020, Zhang starred in the romantic drama Everyone Wants to Meet You produced by Zhao Wei. Zhang also appeared in the historical romance drama The Blooms at Ruyi Pavilion alongside Ju Jingyi.

In 2021, Zhang starred alongside Gong Jun in the Wuxia drama series Word of Honor, which is an adaptation of the BL novel Tian Ya Ke by Priest. He played the role of Zhou Zishu, an elite royal service leader who leaves his past and starts anew. He then met Wen Kexing, a mysterious martial arts master. Both embark on a journey together and find soulmates in each other. Word of Honor gained popularity in and outside of China, especially after the show aired on Netflix. The show's first episode has accumulated over 8.7 million views on YouTube, and its popularity put the two male leads Gong Jun and Zhang under the spotlight, becoming overnight sensations.

=== 2021: Blacklisting ===
In 2021, anti-fans of Zhang circulated photographs from one of Zhang's friend's social media accounts, showing him in an intimate pose with a woman. Internet users critical of Zhang alleged that he was being dishonest and unprofessional, misleading fans by portraying himself as possibly gay while being involved with a woman.

On August 12, 2021, posts on Douban and Weibo showed Zhang at a friend's 2019 wedding with fellow wedding guest Dewi Sukarno. The posts alleged that Zhang had an anti-Chinese and pro-Japan stance, and many Weibo users described Dewi as "a right-wing anti-Chinese politician". The posts also incorrectly stated that Dewi Sukarno was the wife of the Indonesian President responsible for the massacres of Chinese in Indonesia (Dewi's husband was Sukarno; the massacres were perpetrated under Suharto). The wedding occurred at Nogi Shrine, dedicated to Japanese General Nogi Maresuke, who led forces against China in the First Sino-Japanese War.

On August 13, 2021, photos surfaced online of Zhang posing in front of cherry blossom trees near Japan's Yasukuni Shrine in 2018 and of him attending a wedding ceremony at Nogi Shrine in 2019. The Chinese public and government condemn the shrine, which Japanese politicians visit on the anniversaries of Japan's surrender in World War II, and view the shrine as a symbol of Japanese militarism and Japan's invasion of China. Chinese people refer to visiting the shrine as baigui ("worshipping the devil").

Zhang's photos sparked outrage among Chinese netizens. Zhang issued an apology, stating: "Today, I deeply apologize for my past ignorance, my shame and especially my previous improper behaviour. I attended a friend's wedding in Japan. It is my mistake for the oversight of [not knowing] the historical background behind the wedding venue and the political background of the other wedding guests. When I used to travel everywhere, I liked to casually take pictures. Due to the lack of understanding for the local architecture and the history and being careless about the content when taking pictures, when I took the pictures, it resulted in content that seriously harmed the feelings of compatriots. I also solemnly apologize here, I am sorry." In response, the People's Daily stated: "As a public figure, a lack of historical knowledge and unknowingness of the suffering of the nation is unacceptable."

The China Association of Performing Arts (CAPA), a voluntary association of the entertainment industry, called for a boycott on Zhang due to the controversial photos. CAPA stated, "[I]t is common sense for celebrities to know the history and ignorance is not an excuse ... the Yasukuni shrine is the symbol of Japanese militarism in launching its invasion war and a place where right-wing Japanese deny the history beautify the war ... Zhang's highly improper behavior not only harms the nation but also brings bad influence on youths who follow him as an idol."

Numerous brands, as well as his upcoming films and television shows, terminated their associations with Zhang. Tencent Video, Youku, iQIYI and Mango TV took down his works from their streaming platforms and Zhang's scenes in the movie 1921 were replaced by another actor. Sina Weibo shut down his Super Topic, and his personal and studio accounts were removed from Douyin, Douban and other Chinese sites. QQ Music and NetEase Music removed Zhang's songs from their music platforms. Zhang's anti-fans and online nationalists who had criticised Zhang deemed these events as a major success and referred to themselves as chujiandui ("Traitor Eradication Squad").

Li Xuezheng, Vice Chairman of the China TV Artists Association and Director of the Golden Shield Television Center, questioned the authority of the CAPA to blacklist artists. Li said Zhang was not blacklisted by the National Radio and Television Administration (NRTA) or the Ministry of Culture and Tourism, who, Li argued, are the only authorities to blacklist people in the industry. Li said he was prepared to help Zhang file a lawsuit against CAPA.

On January 1, 2022, Li released a ten-minute audio recording of an interview with Zhang on Weibo, marking Zhang's first public statement on a Chinese social media platform since August 2021. In the recording, Zhang denied entering or visiting Yasukuni Shrine, stated that he was willing to cooperate with any official investigation, and described severe psychological distress experienced by himself and his family following the controversy. Zhang stated that his love for the "motherland" and the Chinese Communist Party (CCP) were unwavering and that his parents were CCP members.

=== 2022–present: Return to public life, music releases ===
In January 2022, a wechat blog named Zhang Sanjian 张三坚 appeared and it shared reviews on books, movies. It had made 18 posts over a few months, before the account was mass reported and deactivated. Two weeks later, another blog named Zhang Sanjian is back 张三坚回来了 made its return, with new posts as well as including some of the older posts from the previous blog. After the establishment of zhangzhehan.net, Zhang Zhehan's Official site, these blog posts have been translated into English for global fans.

In April 2022, Zhang returned to social media and posted a handwritten letter on his Instagram account thanking his supporters and requested that those reading his letter not hurt his family and friends. He also wrote that he and another star of Word of Honor had not had any contact since June 2021. In a follow-up video, he claimed that this ex-colleague had been using elements related to Zhang in their own endorsements without permission. This video and follow up posts caused a number of online fans to report his account as a deep fake due to their ongoing belief that the two actors were secretly in a same-sex romantic relationship despite his clarification. While Zhang did not directly indicate which co-star by name, newspapers reported his posts implicated his co-star Gong Jun's marketing team as the ones capitalizing on the fandom shipping of the two while Zhang was cancelled. In the same video, Zhang stated outside sources were "spending lots of money to create rumors about the political standing of a patriotic citizen, editing Baidu pages, working with social influencers, and using large amounts of Internet Water Army to influence the media."

In December 2022, Zhang returned from a year of domestic boycott with two singles "Melancholy Sunshine" and "Knight Errant", both reaching #1 on the global iTunes music charts. The lyricist and composer for "Melancholy Sunshine" was Malaysian songwriter Keon Chia, and Zhang Zhehan helped compose the lyrics for "Knight Errant". Both of the singles are part of the album Deep Blue. On January 14, 2023, the third single "Journey", in the Deep Blue series was released on various platforms. Zhang wrote and composed this song. The song played on Taiwanese radio HIT FM and Canadian Fairchild radio from December 28 to 30, 2022. On January 26, 2023, the fourth single "Primordial Theater", in the Deep Blue series was released on various platforms. Zhang wrote the lyrics for this song. The fifth single, "Lost Glacier," of the Deep Blue series was released on February 14, 2023. The song was earlier launched on Taiwanese radio HIT FM and Canadian Fairchild radio from February 8 to 10, 2023. The sixth single, Magnificent Life, of the Deep Blue series, premiered on YouTube on March 17, 2023. It was released on various platforms at midnight on March 18, 2023. The seventh song, Stars light you up, of the Deep Blue series, premiered on YouTube on April 13, 2023. The song was jointly premiered on multiple radio stations from April 12 to 14, 2023, including Taiwanese radio Hit Fm Network, MY Malaysia, UFM Singapore, and Canadian Fairchild radio. The album, Deep Blue, was released on April 14, 2023.

On April 26, 2023, the first single "Datura", in the Datura series was released on various platforms. On May 8, 2023, the second single "Believer", in the Datura series was released on various platforms. From May 10 to 11, 2023, Zhang held his concert titled "Zhang Zhehan 2023 Concert: Primordial Theater" in Bangkok, Thailand. Zhang was reportedly involved in various aspects of the concert, and celebrated his 32nd birthday with fans. On May 21, 2023, the third single "Moonlight", in the Datura series was released on various platforms. The song was premiered jointly on multiple radio stations from May 17 to 19, 2023. On June 21, 2023, the fourth single "Time to leave", in the Datura series was released on various platforms. On August 8, 2023, the fifth single "Unfinished Journey", in the Datura series was released on various platforms. Zhang co-wrote the lyrics and music for this song. In September 2023, Zhang released two more singles in the Datura series, "Pressure" and "Chase". On September 17, 2023, Zhang held the second stop of his concert titled “Zhang Zhehan 2023 Concert: Primordial Theater” in Kuala Lumpur, Malaysia. On October 7, 2023, Zhang performed on MY BIG SHOW A.I.23 in Kuala Lumpur, Malaysia. On November 25, 2023, at Yes 933 Hits Fest 2023 in Singapore, Zhang, who won "Artist of the Year", performed several of his own songs including "Magnificent Life", which was crowned "Hit of the Year".

== Filmography ==
=== Films ===
Year	English title	Chinese title	Role	Notes	Ref.
2011	Ni Shi Hen Mei	逆时·恒美	Xiao Zhi		
2011	Love For Hope	爱缤纷	Zou Xiang		
2012	Eager to Create	为渴望而创	Ah Le		
2012	Haunting Love	诡爱	Li Ming Yan		
2019	The Bravest	烈火英雄	Zheng Zhi		
2019	Brother	哥	Wang Yue	Short Film directed by Zhao Wei for the show Everybody Stand By (Season 1)	
2019	long Island Ice Tea	長島冰茶	Xiao Fei	Short Film directed by Zhao Wei for the show Everybody Stand By (Season 1)	
2019	Mi Fang		Xiao Fei	Short Film directed by Zhao Wei for the show Everybody Stand By (Season 1)	
2019	Mask	面具	Xiao Fei / Xue Shao	Short Film directed by Zhao Wei for the show Everybody Stand By (Season 1)	
2021	1921		Xiao Zisheng		
2024	August	八月	Zhang Zhehan	Zhang Zhehan's directorial debut documentary	
2024	August	八月	Zhang Zhehan	ARFF Amsterdam Official May 2024 Selection ARFF Globe Award	
2024	August	八月	Zhang Zhehan	Red Movie Rewards 2024 Summer Edition Best Screenplay	
2024	August	八月	Zhang Zhehan	ARFF Amsterdam 2024 Best Documentary	

=== Television series ===
Year	English title	Chinese title	Role	Network	Ref.
2010	Why Love You	怎么会爱上你	Xia Yanxi	Youku, LeTV	
2013	Crazy for Palace	我为宫狂	Xiao Hao	Tencent	
2014	Palace 3: The Lost Daughter	宫锁连城	Sun He Li	Hunan TV	
2014	Incisive Great Teacher	犀利仁师	Jin Ren Bin	Dragon TV, Zhejiang TV, iQIYI	
2014	Cosmetology High	美人制造	Pei Yuntian	Hunan TV	
2014	The Romance of the Condor Heroes	神雕侠侣	Ye Lu Qi	Hunan TV	
2014	Crazy for Palace 2	我为宫狂2	Xiao Hao	Tencent	
2015	Love Yunge from the Desert	大汉情缘之云中歌	Liu Xu	Hunan TV, Youku, iQIYI	
2015	Nirvana in Fire	琅琊榜	Lin Shu (Young)	Beijing TV, Dragon TV, Tencent, iQIYI	
2015	Legend of Ban Shu	班淑传奇	Wei Ying	Youku	
2016	ACG Hero	动漫英雄	Zhang Wei	Sohu TV	
2016	Decoded	解密	Han Bing	Hunan TV, Tencent, iQIYI	
2016	Demon Girl	半妖倾城	Ming Xia	Mango TV	
2016	Happy Mitan	欢喜密探	Dian Xiao Er	Youku	
2016	Memory Lost	美人为馅	(Guy in the dream)	iQiyi	
2016	Demon Girl II	半妖倾城II	Ming Xia	Mango TV	
2017	Above the Clouds	云巅之上	Ke Luo	iQiyi	
2018	Legend of Yunxi	芸汐传	Long Fei Ye	iQiyi	
2020	Everyone Wants to Meet You	谁都渴望遇见你	Zhang Min	iQiyi	
2020	The Blooms at Ruyi Pavilion	如意芳霏	Xu Jin	iQiyi	
2021	Word of Honor	山河令	Zhou Zishu/Zhou Xu	Youku	
2023	Castle in the Time	時光之城	Gu Chi Jun	LaLa TV	
TBA	The Second Sight Fall in Love	一见不倾心	Yang Jing Yi	Uncertain due to his controversy	
TBA	Zhao Ge	朝歌	Ji Fa	Uncertain due to his controversy	
TBA	Retro Detective	复古神探	Huang Wei Ping	Uncertain due to his controversy	

=== Variety shows ===
Year	English title	Chinese title	Role	Network
2010	China-Korea Dream Team	中韩梦之队		
2010	A Good Boy at Home	家有好男儿	Guest	
2014	Laugh Out Loud	我们都爱笑		
2014		新闻当事人		
2014	The Generation Show	年代秀		
2014	Happy Camp	快乐 大本营	Guest	Hunan TV
2015	Trump Card	大牌对王牌		
2015		灌篮高手		
2015	Lets Go! Dream Team Season 2	中韩梦之队	Guest	Shenchuan TV
2015	China and South Korea Dream Team	中韩梦之队	Cast member	Shenchuan TV
2016	The Amazing Race China	极速前进	Cast member	Shenzhen TV
2017	Beat the Champions	来吧冠军		
2018	Give Me Five 2	高能少年团 2	Guest	Zhejiang TV
2018	Taste of Time (10/21 & 10/28)	时光的味道	Cast member	iQIYI, Beijing TV
2018	Happy Camp (09/11 & 11/17)	快乐 大本营	Guest	Hunan TV
2019	Everybody Stand By (Season 1)	演员请就位	Contestant	Tencent
2020	Ace vs Ace (Season 5)	王牌对王牌	Guest	Zhejiang TV
2021	Ace vs Ace (Season 6)	王牌对王牌	Guest	Zhejiang TV
2021	Ace Actress	我是女演员	Substitute Teacher (with Gong Jun)	Youku, Jiangsu Satellite TV
2021	Keep Running (Season 9)	奔跑吧	Guest	Zhejiang TV
2021	Happy Camp (04/03 & 06/12)	快乐 大本营	Guest	Hunan TV

== Discography ==
- Light (2019)
- Another Me (2020)
- Deep Blue (2023)
- Datura (2024)
- Scavenger (2025)
- Kaleidoscope (2025)

== Concerts ==
Year	Title	Notes	Ref.
2020	First Mini Concert	Beijing (October 18, 2020)	
2021	Word of Honor Theme Concert: Born to Be Soulmates	Suzhou (May 3 & 4, 2021)	
2023	Zhang Zhehan 2023 Concert: Primordial Theater	Bangkok, Thailand (May 10–11, 2023)	
2023	Zhang Zhehan 2023 Concert: Primordial Theater	Kuala Lumpur, Malaysia (September 17, 2023)	
2023	MY BIG SHOW A.I.23	Kuala Lumpur, Malaysia (October 7, 2023)	
2023	Yes 933 Hits Fest 2023	Singapore (November 25, 2023)	
2024	Zhang Zhehan 2024 Concert: Primordial Theater	Hong Kong, China (February 16, 2024)	
2024	Zhang Zhehan 2024 Concert: Primordial Theater II	Seoul, South Korea (November 16, 2024)	
2025	Zhang Zhehan 2025 Concert: Scavenger	Hong Kong, China (May 10, 2025)	

=== Performances ===
Date	English title	Chinese title	Event	Ref.
May 11, 2021	Birthday Fanmeet Live	生日粉丝见面会	Birthday Douyin Live	
May 21, 2021	Performed Wu Ti (Untitled), Huanrao (Surround), Love Curse & ChaCha of Love	唱了四首歌（两个二重唱）	Viya Streaming Carnival	
June 12, 2021	A Love Letter to Filmmakers	给电影人的情书	Weibo Night Awards	
June 15, 2021	Performed Unbreakable Love & Surround (Huanrao)	永不失联 的爱，环绕	616 True Heart Night	

== Awards and nominations ==
Organization	Year	Category	Result	Ref.
Uno Young Awards	2018	Annual Potential Actor	Won	
Actors Please Take Your Place	2019	Actor most recognized by the audience	Won	
Weibo Night Awards	2019	Most Anticipated New Power in Movies	Won	
Weibo Night Awards	2020	Enterprising Artist of the Year	Won	
Weibo Night Awards	2021	Most Watched/Followed Actor of the Year	Won	
Yes 933 Hits Fest 2023 Awards	2023	Artist of the Year	Won	
Yes 933 Hits Fest 2023 Awards	2023	Hit of the Year	Won	
Hito Music Awards	2024	The Most Popular Newcomer Award	Won	
Hito Music Awards	2024	Hito Premiere Click Popularity Award	Won	
KKBox 19th Music Awards	2024	Artist of the Year	Won	
ARFF Amsterdam Official May 2024 Selection	2024	ARFF Globe Award	Won	
ARFF Amsterdam 2024 Annual Awards	2024	Best Documentary	Won	
Red Movie Rewards 2024 Summer Edition	2024	Best Screenplay	Won	
Red Movie Rewards 2024 Summer Edition	2024	Best Drone	Honorable Mention	
Madrid Film Awards 2024/25 11th Edition	2024	Best Half-Length Film	Won	
Madrid Film Awards 2024/25 11th Edition	2024	Best Editing	Official Selection	
Moverick Movie Awards	2024	Best Cinematography	Nominated	
KKBox 20th Music Awards	2025	Artist of the Year	Won	
Mindfield Film Festival • Albuquerque (Bi-Monthly Competition - November/December 2024)	2025	Best Documentary Feature: Diamond Award	Won	
Mindfield Film Festival • Albuquerque (Bi-Monthly Competition - November/December 2024)	2025	Best Director: Platinum Award	Won	
Accolade Global Film Competition	2025	Awards of Excellence - Special Mention	Won	
Yes 933 Hits Fest 2025 Awards	2025	Artist of the Year	Won	
