= Ju Jingyi =

Chinese singer, actress and dancer

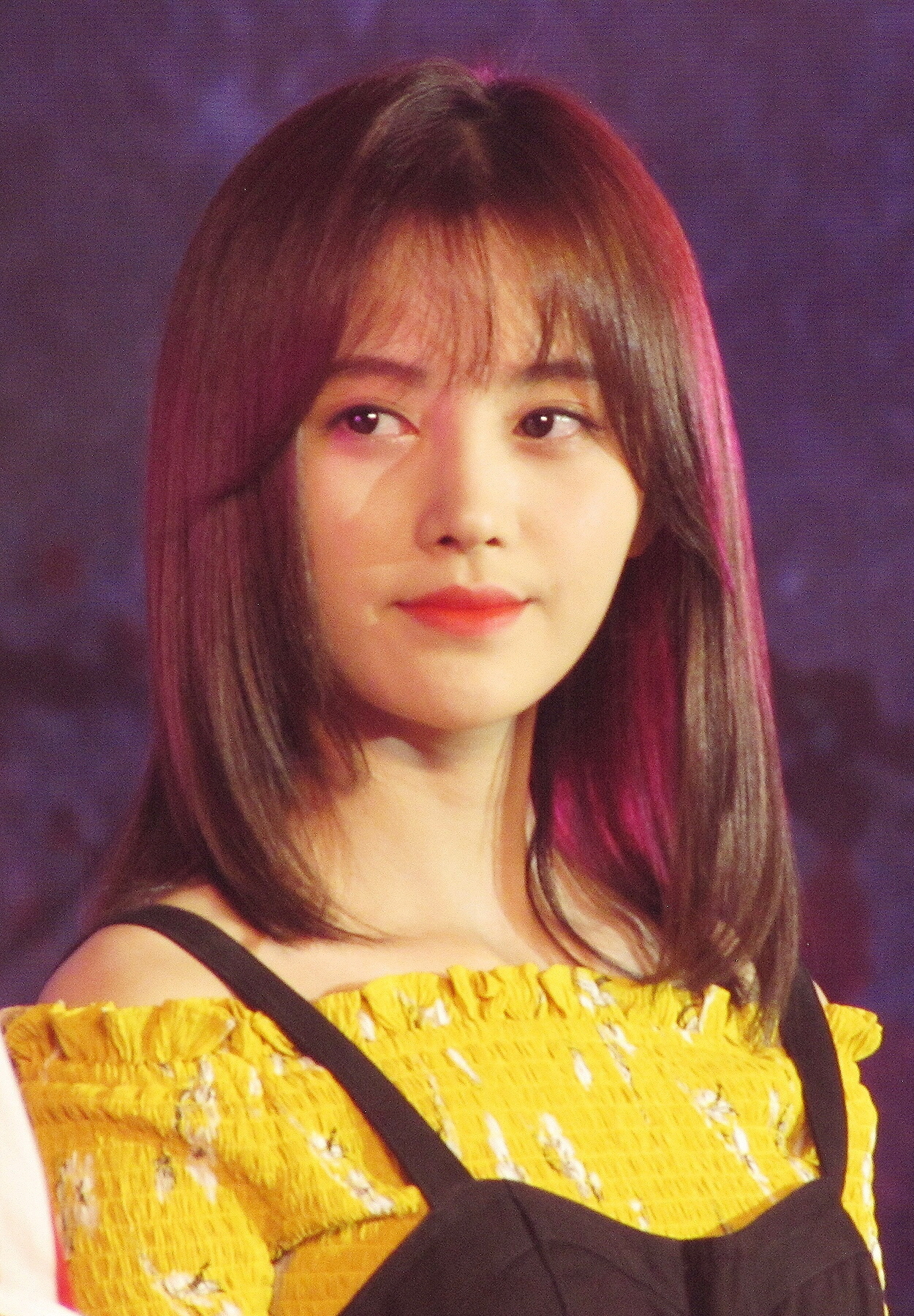
- Ju in 2017
- Born: 18 June 1994 (age 32); Suining, Sichuan, China
- Other names: Kiku, Xiaoju (小鞠)
- Education: Sichuan Conservatory of Music (dropped out)
- Occupations: singer; Actress; dancer
- Musical career
- Genre: Mandopop
- Instruments: Vocals; piano; violin
- Years active: 2013–present
- Label: Star48 Culture Media Group
- Formerly of: SNH48

Chinese name
- Simplified Chinese: 鞠婧祎
- Traditional Chinese: 鞠婧禕
Transcriptions
Standard Mandarin
- Hanyu Pinyin: Jū Jìngyī
- Website: ju-jingyi.com

Ju Jingyi (Chinese: 鞠婧祎; born 18 June 1994) is a Chinese singer, dancer, and actress. She is best known as a former member of the Chinese idol girl group SNH48.

As a member of SNH48, during the annual General Elections, she was elected as No.4 (2014), No.2 (2015), No.1 (2016), and No.1 (2017) among over 100 members. As an actress, she is known for her roles in television dramas Legend of Yunxi (2018), The Legend of White Snake (2019), Beauty of Resilience (2023), Sword and Fairy 4 (2024), and In Blossom (2024).

== Early life ==
Ju Jingyi was born in Suining, Sichuan. She studied at The Attached Middle School of Sichuan Conservatory of Music, majoring in violin, but dropped out to audition for SNH48.

== Career ==
=== 2014–2017: SNH48 and acting debut ===
On 18 August 2013, Ju took part in the audition for second-generation members of SNH48 and was one of the 34 girls who qualified, becoming one of the 31 official second-generation members on 5 September. She made her first public appearance on 21 September, and had started performing weekly at the SNH48 Dream Stage. In November, she became a member of Team NII of SNH48. She participated in SNH48's first major concert, "SNH48 Guangzhou Concert", held in the Guangzhou International Sports Arena on 16 November.

In May 2014, Ju starred in her first music video, "Football Party". She subsequently ranked fourth during SNH48's first "General Election", during which they released their first album, Mae Shika Mukanee.

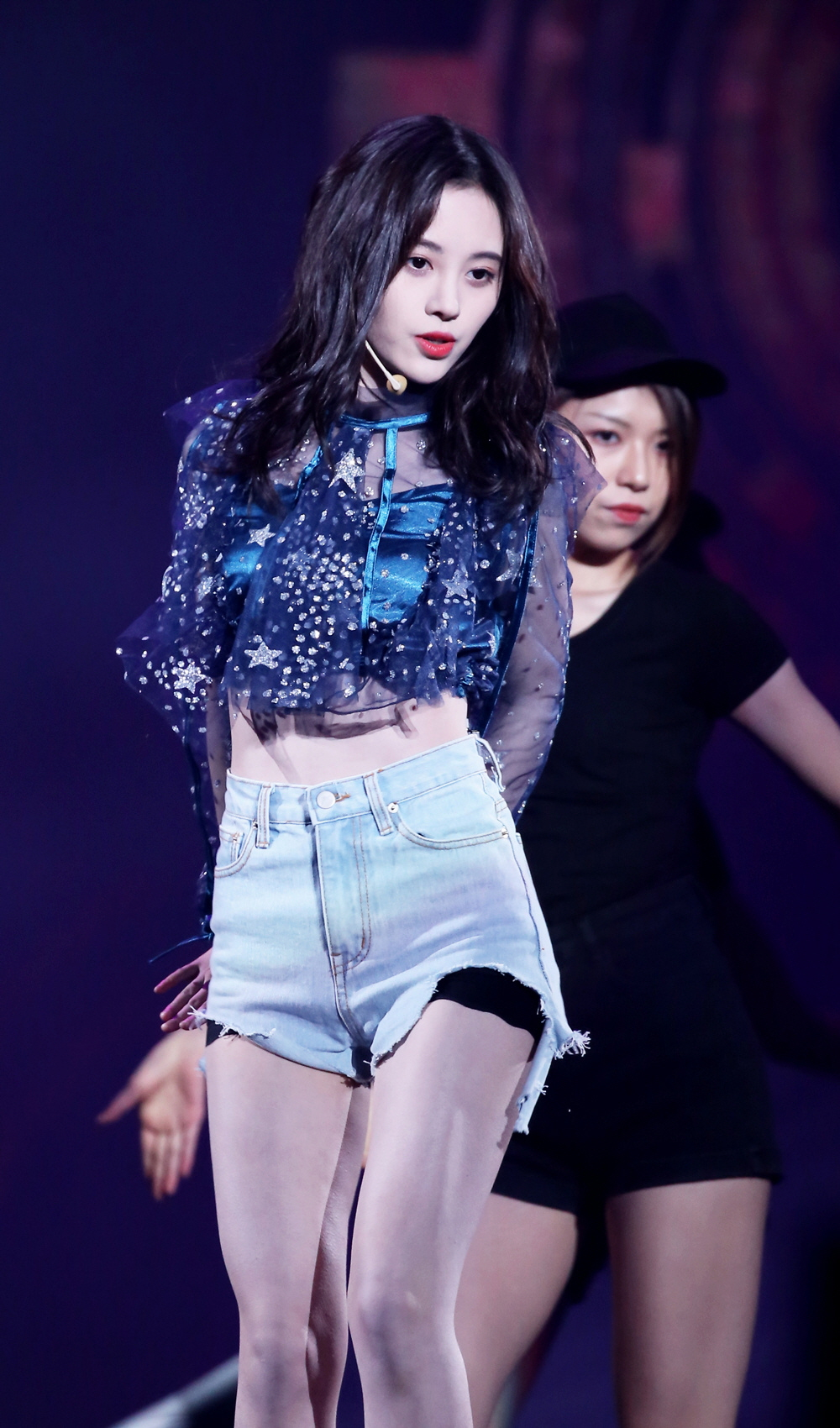
Ju at Migu Music Festival in 2017

Ju was ranked second in SNH48's second "General Election", held on 25 July 2015. She became a member of sub-unit Seine River along with Zhao Jiamin and Li Yitong. Their first single "Sweet & Bitter" (苦与甜) was released on 31 October 2015.

In 2016, Ju made her acting debut in the fantasy drama Novoland: The Castle in the Sky, which started airing in July. She also released a soundtrack for the drama, titled "Xue Fei Shuang". On 30 July, during SNH48's third General Election, Ju was ranked first place with over 230,000 votes, the highest ever number of votes received by an SNH48 member. On 17 October, Ju released her first solo single "Everyday". On 10 December, she won the New Television Actress of the Year Award at the Tencent Video Star Awards for her performance in Novoland: The Castle in the Sky.

On 7 January 2017, she participated in SNH48's third Request Time, of which her song "Don't Touch", performed with Zeng Yanfen and Zhao Yue, came in first, allowing her to release her second solo single. On 15 February, she took on her first leading role in the detective web drama, Detective Samoyeds. The series was a success and broke 10 billion views at the end of its two seasons. In May, Ju was announced to be one of the recipients of the "May 4th Medal", awarded by the Chinese Communist Youth League (CCYL) to outstanding youths who have made remarkable achievements in agriculture, hi-tech research, news coverage, politics and law, army and police. The same month, Ju released her second EP, Yes Or No. During SNH48's fourth General Election held on 29 July, Ju came in first with 277781.3 votes, becoming the first SNH48 member to hold the position as the senbatsu center for a consecutive year. In August, she featured in the fantasy drama Xuan-Yuan Sword: Han Cloud, portraying a gentle mute girl.

On 15 December 2017, it was announced that Ju would depart from SNH48 and continue promotions as a solo artist under Star48. An individual studio and website have been launched to manage her solo career. On 18 December, she released a solo single titled Rain.

=== 2018–present: Solo career and rising popularity ===
In 2018, Ju starred in the historical drama Legend of Yunxi alongside Zhang Zhehan. She sang the theme songs for the drama, "The Fallen Flowers Turn into Mud", and "Sigh of Yunxi". The series was a commercial hit and received positive reviews for light-hearted and sweet storyline, leading to increased popularity for Ju. The same year, Ju starred in the romantic comedy-drama Mr. Swimmer alongside Mike Angelo. Ju also became one of the judges for the music variety show The Chinese Youth.

In 2019, Ju starred in the web series adaptation of the Chinese folktale legend Legend of the White Snake alongside Yu Menglong, playing the titular role of Bai Suzhen. She also sung the soundtracks for the drama, including new rendition of classic songs like "Qian Nian Deng Yi Hui" (A Millennium's Wait for a Return), "Du Qing" (Passing Feelings) and "Qing Cheng Shan Xia Bai Suzhen" (Bai Suzhen under Mount Qingcheng). The same year, Ju starred as the female lead in period suspense drama Please Give Me a Pair of Wings alongside Aaron Yan. Ju was named as one of the most recognizable Chinese actresses in web dramas by the Hong Kong media, and won the Best Actress award at the China Canada Television Festival Award for her performance in Legend of Yunxi. Ju entered the Forbes China Celebrity 100 list for the first time, ranking 94th. Forbes China also listed Ju under their 30 Under 30 Asia 2019 list which consisted of 30 influential people under 30 years old who have had a substantial effect in their fields. In November, Ju released her third EP titled Love Emergency Report.

In 2020, Ju appeared in CCTV New Year's Gala for the first time, acting out a skit Like You Like Me. She starred in the historical romance dramas In a Class of Her Own alongside Song Weilong; and The Blooms at Ruyi Pavilion, which is the unofficial sequel of Legend of Yunxi reuniting with Legend of Yunxi co-star Zhang Zhehan and supporting stars Xu Jiaqi and Wang Youshuo. She ranked 84th on Forbes China Celebrity 100 list.

In 2021, Ju starred in the historical romance drama Rebirth For You alongside Joseph Zeng and the romance fantasy series Love Under the Full Moon alongside Zheng Yecheng. In 2023, she starred in the xianxia romance Beauty of Resilience opposite Guo Junchen. In 2024, Ju starred in In Blossom (花间令), a costume romance and mystery drama released as a Youku original series. Ju plays a woman who assumes another identity after surviving an attack, and she stars opposite Liu Xueyi. The series began streaming in March 2024 and was widely discussed on Chinese social media for its crime-investigation structure within a traditional costume setting. Later that year, she starred in Sword and Fairy 4, a television adaptation of the popular Chinese role-playing game The Legend of Sword and Fairy Ju portrays the heroine Han Lingsha, a tomb-raider who joins the male lead on a journey across a fantasy world. The series draws on the game's mythology and was promoted to fans of the long-running Sword and Fairy franchise. In 2026, Ju starred in Veil of Shadows with actor Tian Jiarui. She plays Lu Wuyi, a clever nine-tailed fox demon undercover in the human world to hunt a dangerous traitor.

== Public image ==
Ju has been referred to as a "once in 4,000 years idol" by Chinese fans since 2014; however, due to a slight mistranslation, she has also been called a "once in 4,000 years beauty" by the Japanese media, causing her to receive increased prominence and criticism.

== Discography ==
=== Albums ===
| Year | English title | Chinese title | Notes/Ref. |
|---|---|---|---|
| 2016 | Everyday | 每一天 | |
| 2017 | Yes or No | 等不到你 | |
| 2019 | Love Emergency Report | 恋爱告急 | |

=== Singles ===
| Year | English title | Chinese title | Notes |
|---|---|---|---|
| 2017 | "Rain" | 分裂时差 | |
| 2018 | "Don't Touch" | "Don't Touch" | |
| 2019 | "Writing Poems in Loneliness" | 孤独与诗 | |
| 2020 | "Winter Day" | 冬日 | |
| 2020 | "Love Hasn't Ended" | 爱未央 | |
| 2020 | "Song of Chasing Light" | 琢光曲 | |
| 2021 | "Past Perfect" | 过去完成时 | |
| 2022 | "0.2" | "0.2" | |
| 2023 | "Sakura" | | |
| 2026 | "FIND THE WAY" | "FIND THE WAY" | |

=== Soundtracks ===
| Year | English title | Chinese title | Album | Notes/Ref. |
|---|---|---|---|---|
| 2015 | "Fate Ends in the World" | 缘尽世间 | Mo Tian Ji OST | with Zhao Jiamin and Xu Jiaqi |
| 2016 | "Fighting Day" | | Hot Girl OST | |
| 2016 | "Drunk Fei Shuang" | 醉飞霜 | Novoland: The Castle in the Sky OST | |
| 2018 | "The Fallen Flowers Turn into Mud" | 落花成泥 | Legend of Yunxi OST | |
| 2018 | "Sigh of Yunxi" | 叹云兮 | Legend of Yunxi OST | |
| 2018 | "Please Answer If You Heard" | 听到请回答 | Mr. Swimmer OST | |
| 2018 | "Missing You" | 想你了 | Mr. Swimmer OST | |
| 2019 | "Eternal" | 天长 | Legend of Qingyun OST | |
| 2019 | "A Millennium's Wait for a Return" | 千年等一回 | The Legend of White Snake OST | |
| 2019 | "Passing Feelings" | 渡情 | The Legend of White Snake OST | |
| 2019 | "Bai Suzhen under Mount Qingcheng" | 青城山下白素贞 | The Legend of White Snake OST | |
| 2019 | "A Pair of Wings" | 一双翅膀 | Please Give Me a Pair of Wings OST | |
| 2020 | "Dream Journey" | 梦的旅航 | Love and Producer OST | |
| 2020 | "Ancient Painting" | 古画 | The Blooms at Ruyi Pavilion OST | |
| 2020 | "Fu Rong" | 芙蓉 | The Blooms at Ruyi Pavilion OST | |
| 2020 | "Dreams Crossing" | 梦渡 | The Blooms at Ruyi Pavilion OST | with Henry Huo |
| 2021 | “Time to Go Back” | 倒流 | The Dance of the Storm OST | |

=== Other appearances ===
| Year | English title | Chinese title | Notes/Ref. |
|---|---|---|---|
| 2018 | "The Future Me" | 未来已来 | Theme song for China's Communist Youth League |
| 2019 | "My Motherland and I" | 我和我的祖国 | Project for People's Republic of China's 70th anniversary |
| 2020 | "Ordinary and Great" | 平凡与伟大 | COVID-19 support song |

== Filmography ==
=== Film ===
| Year | English title | Chinese title | Role | Notes | Ref. |
|---|---|---|---|---|---|
| 2015 | Mo Tian Jie | 魔天劫 | Jialan | Short film | |
| 2015 | Love, At First | 爱之初体验 | | Cameo | |
| 2018 | Starlight | 星梦之光 | | Documentary | |
| 2018 | Forgetting Years | 忘年 | | Short film | |
| 2021 | Catman | 我爱喵星人 | Molly | | |
| 2024 | Money Bastion | 金钱堡垒 | Han Xiaomei | Cameo | |

=== Television series ===
| Year | English title | Chinese title | Role | Network | Notes |
|---|---|---|---|---|---|
| 2015 | The Unexpected | 史料不及 | Housekeeper's daughter | Hunan TV | Cameo |
| 2016 | Novoland: The Castle in the Sky | 九州·天空城 | Xue Feishuang | JSTV, MZTV | |
| 2017 | Detective Samoyeds | 热血长安 | Shangguan Zisu | Youku | |
| 2017 | Xuan-Yuan Sword: Han Cloud | 轩辕剑之汉之云 | Lan Yin | Dragon TV | Cameo |
| 2018 | Legend of Yunxi | 芸汐传 | Han Yunxi | iQIYI, Viki | |
| 2018 | Mr. Swimmer | 游泳先生 | Song Chacha | Mango TV | |
| 2019 | The Legend of White Snake | 新白娘子传奇 | Bai Suzhen | iQIYI, Viki | |
| 2019 | Please Give Me a Pair of Wings | 请赐我一双翅膀 | Lin Jiuge | iQIYI | |
| 2020 | In a Class of Her Own | 漂亮书生 | Xue Wenxi | iQIYI, Viki | |
| 2020 | The Blooms at Ruyi Pavilion | 如意芳霏 | Fu Rong | iQIYI, Viki | |
| 2021 | Love Under the Full Moon | 满月之下请相爱 | Lei Chuxia | iQIYI, Viki | |
| 2021 | Rebirth for You | 嘉南传 | Jiang Baoning | iQIYI, Tencent, Viki | |
| 2023 | Beauty of Resilience | 花戎 | Wei Zhi / Sima Wangyue / A Ya | iQIYI, Viki | |
| 2024 | Sword and Fairy 4 | 仙剑四 | Han Lingsha | iQIYI | |
| 2024 | In Blossom | 花间令 | Yang Caiwei / Shangguan Zhi | Viki, Youku | |
| 2026 | Veil of Shadows | 月鳞绮纪 | Lu Wuyi / Di Zhu | Youku | |
| 2026 | The Eternal Fragrance | 千香 | Jiang Lifei | Youku | |
| TBA | Let's Fight | 来战 | A Dai | iQIYI, Tencent | |
| TBA | Wanhua Sin | 万花世界 | Su Luxia | Tencent | |

=== Variety show ===
| Year | English title | Chinese title | Role | Ref. |
|---|---|---|---|---|
| 2018 | The Chinese Youth | 国风美少年 | Judge | |

== Awards and nominations ==
| Year | Award | Category | Nominated work | Result | Ref. |
|---|---|---|---|---|---|
| 2016 | 10th Tencent Video Star Awards | New Television Actress of the Year | —N/a | Won | |
| 2016 | 2016 NetEase Attitude Award | Most Popular New Artist | —N/a | Won | |
| 2017 | 24th ERC Chinese Top Ten Awards | Best Breakthrough Artist | —N/a | Won | |
| 2017 | Chinese Communist Youth League | "May 4th Medal" | —N/a | Won | |
| 2017 | 11th Migu Music Awards | Top 10 Songs of the Year | "Think of You" | Won | |
| 2018 | Weibo Awards Ceremony | Improved Artist of the Year | —N/a | Won | |
| 2018 | 25th ERC Chinese Top Ten Awards | Crossover Artist Award | —N/a | Won | |
| 2018 | Netease Traditional Music Night | New Female Singer Award | —N/a | Won | |
| 2018 | 7th iQiyi All-Star Carnival | Promising Artist Award | —N/a | Won | |
| 2019 | China Canada Television Festival Award | Best Actress (Web series) | Legend of Yunxi | Won | |
| 2019 | 26th ERC Chinese Top Ten Awards | Trend Singer Award | —N/a | Won | |
| 2019 | Golden Bud - The Fourth Network Film And Television Festival | Best Actress | The Legend of White Snake, Please Give Me a Pair of Wings | Nominated | |
| 2019 | 8th iQiyi All-Star Carnival | Breakthrough Female Artist | —N/a | Won | |
| 2020 | 27th ERC Chinese Top Ten Awards | Best Stage Interpretation | "Love Emergency Report" | Won | |
| 2020 | 27th ERC Chinese Top Ten Awards | Best Breakthrough Artist | —N/a | Won | |
| 2020 | 7th The Actors of China Award Ceremony | Best Actress (Web series) | —N/a | Nominated | |
