= Nils Kristian Myhre =

Norwegian footballer and newspaper editor

Nils Kristian Myhre (born 17 March 1971) is a Norwegian newspaper editor and former footballer.

He hails from Skarnes. In his football career he played for Grue IL, Kongsvinger IL, Elverum IL and Nybergsund IL. For Kongsvinger he got one season in the highest Norwegian league, in 1990, where he played three games. He also played in one Norwegian football cup game. After leaving top-tier football he worked as a school teacher in Elverum before starting as a journalist in Hamar Dagblad in 1999. He then worked in Østlendingen before becoming editor-in-chief of Romsdals Budstikke. From 2008 he worked in Edda Media, and in 2009 he became editor-in-chief of Østlendingen.
