= Lin Siyi =

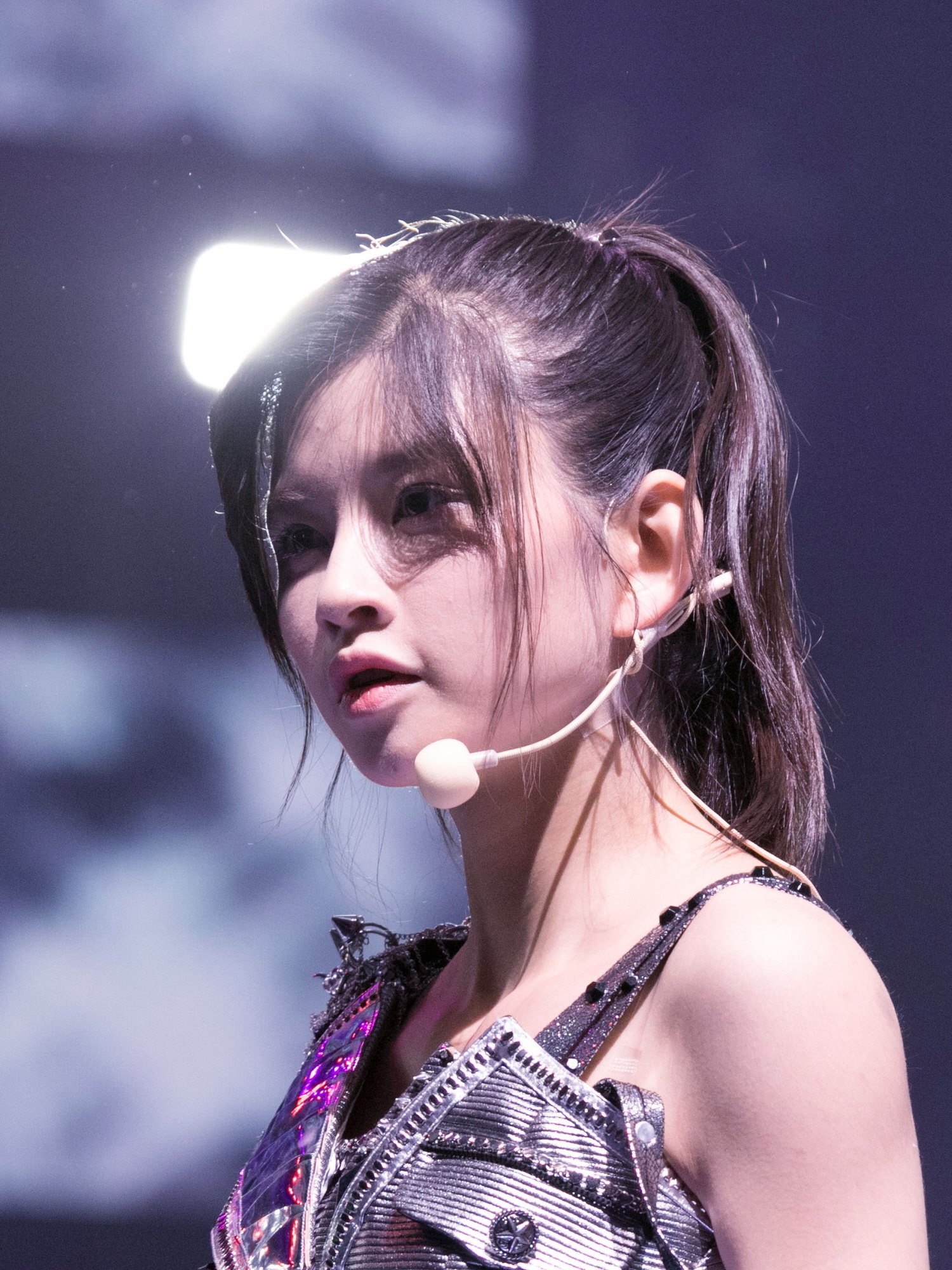
- Lin in 2016
- Born: April 5, 1994 (age 32); Wenzhou, Zhejiang, China
- Occupations: Singer, actress
- Years active: 2013–present
- Musical career
- Genres: Pop, Mandopop
- Instrument: Vocals
- Labels: Star48; Ninestyle Model Agency; Ninestyle Music

Lin Siyi (Chinese: 林思意; pinyin: Lín Sīyì; born April 5, 1994, in Wenzhou, Zhejiang, China) is a Chinese singer and actress, and a former member of Team HII of Chinese idol girl group SNH48.

== Career ==
=== SNH48 ===
Prior to her entry into SNH48, Lin worked as a television director for Beijing TV Life Channel from August to December 2012, and as an intern editor for Board Games (Chinese: 桌游志) magazine.

On August 3, Lin took part in the audition for second-generation members of SNH48, and was one of the 34 girls who qualified, becoming one of the 31 official second-generation members on September 5. In November, she became a member of Team NII of SNH48.

In January 2014, Lin took part in the "SNH48 1st Kouhaku Uta Gassen", and was announced as acting captain In September, she starred in a play based on the comic One Hundred Thousand Bad Jokes.

In July 2015, during SNH48's 2nd General Election, she was ranked 17th with 16050.5 votes, and was made the Under Girls center. In July 2016, during SNH48's third General Election, she came in 13th with 38786.4 votes. In July 2017, during SNH48's fourth General Election, Lin came in 14th with 45981.6 votes.

In February 2018, during SNH48's fourth Request Time, Lin was transferred to Team HII as part of the SNH48 Team Shuffle. In July 2018, during SNH48's fifth General Election, Lin came in 10th.

=== Solo activities ===
In 2016, Lin made her acting debut in the historical comedy drama Legend of Ace. The same year, Lin was cast in the gastronomy comedy film Return Upon Shef.

Lin gained recognition after playing supporting roles in the hit xianxia drama Fighter of the Destiny, followed by the popular historical romance drama Legend of Yunxi.

In 2018, Lin took on her first lead role in the campus web drama Lost Control. The same year, she was cast in the historical romantic film The Story of Turandot directed by Zheng Xiaolong, and youth music drama So Young.

== Discography ==
Year	English title	Chinese title	Role	Notes
2017	"Lost Control"	恋爱脱线时	Lost Control OST	
2018	"Crimson Rouge"	胭脂绯红	Legend of Yunxi OST	

== Filmography ==
=== Film ===
Year	English title	Chinese title	Role	Notes
TBA	Your Return	食神归来	Su Jingyao	
TBA	The Story of Turandot	三色镯：破谜重生	Liu'er	

=== Television series ===
Year	English title	Chinese title	Role	Notes
2015	The Unexpected	史料不及	Housekeeper's daughter	Cameo
2016	Legend of Ace	极品家丁	Xiao Yushuang	
2017	Fighter of the Destiny	择天记	Little Black Dragon	
2018	Legend of Yunxi	芸汐传	Ouyang Ning Jing	
2018	Lost Control	恋爱脱线时	Miao Yuzhi	
2020	So Young	小夜曲	Xu Qing'er	
2020	Charming and Countries	十国千娇		
2026	Pursuit of Jade	逐玉	Shisan Niang	

== SNH48 activities ==
=== EPs ===
Year	No.	Title	Role	Notes
2013	3	Fortune Cookie of Love	B-side	Debut with SNH48 Team NII
2014	4	Heart Electric	B-side	
2014	5	UZA	B-side	
2015	6	Give Me Five!	A-side	
2015	7	After Rain	B-side	
2015	8	Manatsu no Sounds Good!	B-side	
2015	9	Halloween Night	A-side	Ranked 17th in the 2nd General election Under Girls Center
2015	10	New Year's Bell	B-side	
2016	11	Engine of Youth	B-side	First original EP
2016	12	Dream Land	B-side	Second original EP
2016	13	Princess's Cloak	A-side	
2017	15	Each Other's Future	A-side	
2017	16	Summer Pirates	B-side	Sang on "Limited season" as part of Team NII
2017	17	Dawn in Naples	A-side	

=== Albums ===
- Mae Shika Mukanee (2014)

=== Units ===
==== SNH48 Stage Units ====
Stage No.	Song	Notes
Team NII 1st Stage "Theater no Megami"	Candy 糖	Center; With Hu Siyi and Yi Jia'ai
Team NII 2nd Stage "Saka Agari"	Ai no Iro 爱的颜色	With Huang Tingting, Dong Yanyun, Yi Jia'ai, Zeng Yanfen and Tang Anqi
Team NII 3rd Stage "Mokugekisha"	Saboten to Gold Rush 仙人掌与淘金热	With Tang Anqi, Dong Yanyun, Gong Shiqi, Huang Tingting and He Xiaoyu
Team NII 4th Stage "Boku no Taiyou"	Himawari 向日葵	With Meng Yue, Gong Shiqi and He Xiaoyu

==== Concert units ====
Year	Date	Name	Song	Notes
2013	16 November	Guangzhou Concert	Candy 糖	With Hu Siyi and Yi Jia'ai
2014	18 January	Kouhaku Utagassen 2014	Hatsukoi Dorobou 初恋小偷	With Zhao Yue and Gong Shiqi
2015	31 January	Request Hour Setlist Best 30 2015	Saboten to Gold Rush 仙人掌与淘金热; Mushi no Ballad 虫之诗	With Gong Shiqi, Huang Tingting, He Xiaoyu, Tang Anqi and Dong Yanyun; Solo song
2015	25 July	2nd General Election Concert	None	None
2015	26 December	Request Hour Setlist Best 30 2015 (2nd Edition)	Higurashi no Koi 暮蝉之恋	With Ju Jingyi
2016	30 July	3rd General Election Concert	None	None
2017	7 January	Request Hour Setlist Best 50 (3rd Edition)	Oshibe to Meshibe to Yoru no Chouchou 夜蝶; Hajimete no Jelly Beans 巧克力糖果	With Ju Jingyi; With Yang Yunyu and Li Zi
