= Merxat Yalkun =

Chinese actor (born 1991)

- مېرشات يالقۇن
- Born: July 20, 1991 (age 35); Ürümqi, Xinjiang, China
- Education: Shanghai Theatre Academy
- Occupations: Actor, model
- Years active: 2013-present
- Agent: Huanyu Film
- Height: 178 cm (5 ft 10 in)

Chinese name
- Traditional Chinese: 米熱
- Simplified Chinese: 米热
Transcriptions
Standard Mandarin
- Hanyu Pinyin: Mǐrè

Merxat Yalkun (Uyghur: مېرشات يالقۇن; Chinese: 米热夏提·亚里坤; born July 20, 1991), known by the Chinese pet form Mi Re (米热), is an ethnic Uyghur Chinese actor and model who came into the acting scene as Zhang Yizhi in Cosmetology High (2014).

== Early life ==
Merxat was born in Ürümqi, Xinjiang, on July 20, 1991. He aspired to act from an early age. He entered Shanghai Theatre Academy in 2010, majoring in acting, where he studied alongside Dilraba Dilmurat and Yuan Bingyan.

== Career ==
AT 22, Merxat began his career as a fashion model by entering the 2014 Asian Sportsman Contest, where he finished in the top 10. He retired from modeling soon after. Later in 2013, he signed with the agency Yu Zheng Studio. during his third year of school, graduating the following year.

In 2014, he starred in the historical comedy drama Cosmetology High rising to fame as the character Zhang YiZhi.

In 2015, Merxat starred in his first acting role in the historical drama Legend of Ban Shu. The same year, he starred in the fantasy romance web series The Backlight of Love, adapted from Wang Liaoliao's novel of the same title. The same year, he was cast in the youth military drama Deep Blue.

In 2016, Merxat starred in the fantasy web series Demon Girl, an adaptation based on the novel of the same name by Mobai Qianjiu. He then starred in the crime thriller series Memory Lost, based on the novel of the same title by Ding Mo. The same year, he was cast in the fantasy historical epic Zhaoge.

In 2017, Merxat starred in the modern romance drama Love & Life & Lie. The same year, he starred in the romantic comedy television series Above The Clouds.

In 2018, Merxat starred in the historical romance drama Untouchable Lovers produced by Yu Zheng. The same year, he starred in the historical romance drama Legend of Yunxi.

In 2019, Merxat starred in the period suspense drama Please Give Me a Pair of Wings.

In 2020, Merxat starred in the period romance drama Winter Begonia produced by Yu Zheng. The same year, he played the leading role in the historical romance drama For Married Doctress.

In 2021, Merxat starred in the e-sports romance drama Falling Into Your Smile as Yu Ming/God Ming. He played second male lead Wei Xuan He in the modern romance drama Love Under the Full Moon. He had a guest role playing Yin Yu in IQIYI's modern romance Sweet Teeth. He starred in the web movie "Kingdom of Women" playing Tang Ao, alongside actress Meng Ziyi.

In 2022, Merxat starred as a special guest in the modern romance drama, Brilliant Cast 8, playing Mu Chen. He played the charming Shen Yu in "My Sassy Princess", a drama based on a novel. He also starred in a main role in his second movie, "Journey to the North" where he played God Cheng Sheng, alongside actress Lai Yumeng. The movie was released on Tencent VIP.

He has been filming Yue Lai at Hengdian studios.

== Filmography ==
=== Television series ===
Year	English title	Chinese title	Role	Notes
2014	Cosmetology High	美人制造	Zhang Yizhi	
2015	The Backlight of Love	逆光之恋	Mo Yan	Web series
2015	Legend of Ban Shu	班淑传奇	Kou Feng	
2016	The Ladder of Love	爱的阶梯	Lu Yun	
2016	ACG Hero	动漫英雄	The trainee	
2016	Demon Girl	半妖倾城	You Tong	
2016	Memory Lost	美人为馅	Xie Lu (T)	
2017	Love & Life & Lie	遇见爱情的利先生	Ouyang Che	
2017	Above The Clouds	云巅之上	Yue Dong	
2018	Untouchable Lovers	凤囚凰	Tuoba Yun	
2018	Legend of Yunxi	芸汐传	Gu Qishao	
2019	Please Give Me a Pair of Wings	请赐我一双翅膀	Xiao Linfeng	
2020	Winter Begonia	鬓边不是海棠红	Fan Lian	
2020	The Moon Brightens For You	明月曾照江东寒	Wen You	
2020	Consummation	拾光的秘密	Su Zhe	
2020	For Married Doctress	替嫁医女	Yuwen Yong	
2021	Falling Into Your Smile	你微笑时很美	Yu Ming	Web Series
2021	Love Under the Full Moon	满月之下请相爱	Wei Xuan He	
2021	Sweet Teeth	世界微尘里	Yin Yu	Guest Role
2022	Brilliant Class 8	原来是老师啊！	Mu Chen	
2022	My Sassy Princess	祝卿好	Shen Yu	
TBA	Zhaoge	朝歌	Wu Geng	
TBA	Deep Blue	烈火海洋	Tang Yi Gong	
TBA	PLA Air Force	我爱轰炸机	Wu Han	
TBA	Yue Lai	悦来	Guo Zhen Sheng	

== Movies ==
Year	English title	Chinese title	Role	Notes
2021	The Kingdom of Women	镜花缘之决战女儿国	Tang Ao	
2022	Journey to the North	北游记之仙魂下凡	Chang Sheng	

== Discography ==
Singles

Year	English title	Chinese title	Album	Notes/Ref.
2021	Why is the Flower so Red	花儿为什么这样红	100 Year	
