= Shine on Me =

2025 Chinese television drama series

- Promotional poster
- Also known as: Jiao Yang Si Wo
- Traditional Chinese: 驕陽似我
- Simplified Chinese: 骄阳似我
- Hanyu Pinyin: Jiāoyáng Sì Wǒ
- Genre: Romance; Workplace
- Based on: Blazing Sunlight by Gu Man
- Written by: Gu Man; Shen Feixian
- Directed by: Chen Zhoufei
- Starring: Song Weilong; Zhao Jinmai
- Opening theme: "You Are the Sun In My Life" by Vivien Loh
- Ending theme: "Like Me, Like You" by Zhang Bichen
- Country of origin: China
- Original language: Mandarin
- No. of episodes: 36

Production
- Executive producers: Yang Xiaopei; Li Li Ming
- Producers: Jiang Yingying; Zhu Kai; Meng Haorui
- Running time: 45 minutes
- Production companies: Tencent Penguin Pictures; XiXi Pictures

Original release
- Network: Tencent Video
- Release: December 22, 2025 – 7 January 2026

Shine on Me (Chinese: 驕陽似我 lit. 'The blazing sun is like me'), is a 2025 romance Chinese television drama starring Song Weilong and Zhao Jinmai. It was written by acclaimed novelist Gu Man, based on the 2013 Web novel Blazing Sunlight by author Gu Man, directed by Chen Zhoufei. It follows the emotional growth and professional journey of a young woman as she navigates workplace challenges and a healing romance with a former surgeon. On December 22, 2025, It premiered on Tencent Video.

In 2025, it was named "Most Anticipated Drama" at the annual Starlight Awards. Upon release, it achieved significant commercial success, it surpassed the popularity heat index of 30,000 on Tencent Video. It maintained high audience engagement, recording a 9.1 rating on Weibo's idol drama charts and had over 1 billion views across platforms during its broadcast.

== Synopsis ==
Nie Xiguang (Zhao Jinmai) is a university graduate who begins working as a junior administrator at her father's solar energy company. During her studies, Nie maintained an unrequited interest in Zhuang Xu (Lai Weiming), a high-achieving student from a different socioeconomic background. The interactions between the two were characterized by recurring miscommunications and Zhuang's stated personal insecurities.

After entering the professional sector, Nie encounters Lin Yusen (Song Weilong), a vice president at her firm. Lin is a former neurosurgeon who transitioned into corporate management after a hand injury sustained in a traffic accident ended his medical career. Although their initial professional relationship involved interpersonal friction(also due to the history they had in past which Xiguang is unaware of) the two eventually develop a personal connection.

The narrative follows the development of their relationship alongside their work in the clean energy industry. As they spend more time together, Lin provides a stable environment for Nie to move past her previous experiences at university, while Nie's presence coincides with Lin's adjustment to his new career path outside of medicine.

The love story is interwoven with the story of the development and difficulties of the Chinese photo-voltaic industry.

== Cast and characters ==
=== Main ===
- Zhao Jinmai as Nie Xiguang

Nie Xiguang, is the daughter of a solar energy company executive who begins her career as a junior administrator at her father's firm. Despite her family's wealth, she chooses to start in an entry-level position to establish professional independence. Her narrative arc focuses on her transition from her university years marked by an unrequited interest in a classmate (Zhuang Xu) to her development as a corporate professional. She is characterized by a resilient approach to professional challenges and an approachable interpersonal style. Her growth is defined by a shift from her earlier experiences toward a more self-assured role within the clean energy industry and her personal relationships.

- Song Weilong as Lin Yusen

Lin Yusen, is a vice president at a clean energy corporation and a former neurosurgeon. He transitioned into the corporate sector after a traffic accident resulted in a permanent hand injury, ending his medical career. Initially depicted as reserved and professional, his role involves navigating the business demands of the energy industry while developing a connection with Nie Xiguang. His character serves as a stable figure in the narrative, assisting in the professional adaptation of those around him while managing the personal impact of his own career change.

=== Supporting ===
==== Nie Xiguang's circle ====
- Allen Lin as Jiang Ping

Jiang Ping is Nie Xiguang's uncle and a senior executive within the family business. He serves in a supervisory capacity, providing professional oversight and personal guidance to Nie Xiguang as she navigates her role at the firm. His character functions as a representative of the family's corporate interests while maintaining a protective stance regarding Nie Xiguang's career development and personal welfare.

- Jin Qiaoqiao as Jiang Yun

Jiang Yun is Xi Guang's mother and a stabilizing figure within the Nie family. She is depicted as a mediator between her husband's concerns regarding social status and her daughter's pursuit of independence. Her role involves providing emotional support and practical guidance to facilitate communication within the family unit.

- Lawrence Ng as Nie Chengyuan

Nie Chengyuan is the CEO of YuanCheng Group and Nie Xiguang's father. His characterization focuses on his concern for social status and family reputation, which occasionally leads to conflict regarding his daughter's career choices and her relationship with Lin Yusen. Over the course of the narrative, his perspective shifts toward an acknowledgment of his daughter's professional independence and personal judgment.

- Fan Shiran as Yin Jie

Yin Jie is a colleague and personal associate of Nie Xiguang. Her role in the series is that of a supportive peer within the workplace, offering professional assistance and personal encouragement. Her presence in the story illustrates Nie Xiguang's integration into the corporate environment and the development of her professional network.

- Yang Teng as Wan Yuhua

A close friend and former university dormmate. She represents Xiguang's enduring social ties, offering a consistent support system outside of the corporate environment.

- Finn Han as Jiang Rui

Jiang Rui is Nie Xiguang's cousin and a long-term family companion. He maintains a close relationship with her, often acting in a supportive role during her personal and professional transitions. His character emphasizes the familial support structure available to Nie Xiguang throughout the series.

- Kong Linmei as Shen Shu

Shen Shu is Nie Xiguang's aunt who provides personal support and advice. She functions as a non-confrontational presence within the family, offering guidance on personal matters without direct involvement in the family's business disputes or primary conflicts.

- Zhao Xin as Ou Qiqi

An associate within Xiguang's social circle who contributes to the interpersonal dynamics of the group.

- Sun Qian Lan as Boss, Huang Er Chun as Xiao Feng, Chen Si Yi as Si Liang, and Sun Meng Qiu as A Fen

Xiguang's university dormmates who represent her academic background and early social development.

==== Zhuang Xu's circle ====
- Lai Weiming as Zhuang Xu

Zhuang Xu is a high-achieving student from a low-income background whose academic performance contrasts with his socioeconomic insecurities. These factors lead to recurring miscommunications and emotional distance during his university years with Nie Xiguang. In the professional phase of the story, his actions are driven by a pursuit of social mobility and financial stability. His character represents the impact of class disparity on interpersonal dynamics, as his focus on professional advancement frequently conflicts with his personal connections.

- Bai Bingke as Ye Rong

Ye Rong is a university dorm mate of Nie Xiguang and a childhood acquaintance of Zhuang Xu. Within the narrative, her actions frequently result in social friction or minor conflicts that impact Nie Xiguang's university experience. Her character serves as a catalyst for Nie Xiguang's development of interpersonal resilience and adaptability during their time as students.

- Gu Zicheng as Zhuang Fei

Zhuang Xu's younger brother. His role highlights the financial pressures and family expectations that drive Zhuang Xu's career-oriented decisions.

- Huang Haoyue as Chris, Pan Yihong as Kevin and Cai Bing as Mia

Zhuang Xu's corporate colleagues. They characterize the competitive nature of the industry and the peer pressure within high-stakes professional environments.

==== Lin Yusen's circle ====
- Wang Deshun as Sheng Xianmin

Lin Yusen's grandfather. He provides a sense of familial heritage and stability as Yusen navigates his transition from medicine to the energy sector.

- Tong Lei as Sheng Wei'ai

Lin Yusen's mother. She manages the internal family dynamics and provides emotional context regarding the accident that altered Yusen's career path.

- Xiu Qing as Sheng Bokai

A member of the Sheng family representing maternal corporate interests and the external expectations placed upon Yusen.

- Lin Jing as Qian Fangping and Zhan Xiaonan as Yao Shu

Family associates who flesh out the social and professional network of the Sheng family.

==== Other Corporate & Supporting ====
- Li Youchuan as Zhuo Hui
- Qin Xiaoxuan as Fang Shengyi
- Liu Haoyan as Sheng Zhongkai
- Qiu Baihao as Sheng Xingjie
- Jiang Kaiwen as Sheng Shukai
- Li Muyun as Lu Sha
- Hua Mingwei as Lu Shanghang

=== Guest appearances ===
- Li Chentao as Shao Jiaqi (Ep. 1, 22)
- Xu Yulan as Xiguang's grandmother (Ep. 12–13)
- Zhang Chenghe as Mr. Luo: Lin Yusen's stepfather.
- Zhou Jie as Dr. Liu: A medical colleague from Lin Yusen's past.

== Production ==
=== Development ===
The series was officially initiated on October 18, 2024, when it was selected for Tencent Video's 2025 drama lineup. The project is an adaptation of the web novel Blazing Sunlight (Chinese: 骄阳似我; pinyin: Jiāoyáng Sì Wǒ) by the novelist Gu Man, a novelist known for works such as My Sunshine, Love O2O, and You Are My Glory. Unlike the original novel, which features an open ending, the screenplay was expanded to provide a more definitive conclusion for the protagonists.

Prior to its release, the series received industry recognition, including the "Most Anticipated Work" award at the 2024 Tencent Video Star Awards and similar honors at the Kuyun Digital Entertainment Annual Influence Ceremony. In September 2025, the National Copyright Administration included the series in the tenth batch of its "Key Works Copyright Protection Early Warning List.

=== Casting ===
Author Gu Man personally oversaw the casting process for the series. In October 2024, it was announced that Zhao Jinmai and Song Weilong had been cast in the lead roles of Nie Xiguang and Lin Yusen. Zhao was previously noted for her leading role in the 2022 time-loop drama Reset, while Song gained recognition for his performances in Go Ahead (2020) and In a Class of Her Own (2020).

=== Filming ===
Principal photography for the series commenced on December 2, 2024, accompanied by the release of the "Warm Sunshine First Encounter" promotional poster to mark the start of production. The filming process was noted for its significant geographic scale, utilizing diverse regions across China to establish the story's varying environments. Urban workplace sequences were filmed on location in East China, specifically within Shanghai, Suzhou, and Wuxi. To provide a cinematic contrast to the urban settings, the team traveled to Baishan, Jilin, to capture the snow-covered landscapes of the Changbai Mountains, and to Dunhuang, Gansu, for key flashback and desert sequences.

Filming continued through the winter and spring, officially concluding on April 3, 2025. To celebrate the completion of the shoot, the production team released a wrap-up special titled "Between Heartbeats" along with full-cast stills. Throughout 2025, a staggered promotional strategy was employed to maintain public interest, including a Valentine's Day collaboration with Bazaar in February and several thematic posters released in May and June that gained significant visibility on social media for their atmospheric presentation.

== Original soundtrack ==
On December 17, 2025, the official production team announced a comprehensive soundtrack consisting of 17 songs. The soundtrack is divided into three thematic chapters: "Blazing Sun" (骄阳), "Healing Time" (治愈时刻), and "Heartbeat in Harmony" (心动协奏).

=== Chapter 1: Blazing Sun (骄阳) ===
No.	Title	Lyrics	Music	Performer(s)	Length
1.	"You Are The Sun In My Life" (Opening theme)	Hou Zhijian	Hou Zhijian	Lu Yuanyi	2:54
2.	"Like Me, Like You" (似我似你; Ending theme)	Zhang Bichen	Zhang Bichen	Zhang Bichen	3:56
3.	"Everything Remains the Same After Loss" (Growth theme)	Peng Xuebin	Peng Xuebin	Liu Yuning	4:31
Total length:					11:21

=== Chapter 2: Healing Time (治愈时刻) ===
No.	Title	Lyrics	Music	Performer(s)	Length
1.	"Meet" (Encounter)	Yi Jiayang	Lin Yifeng	Stephanie Sun	3:28
2.	"Belief"	Yi Jiayang, Chen Yaochuan	Chen Yaochuan	Jeff Chang	4:12
3.	"The Person Who Was There All Along"	Guo Dongnan	Zhou Yili	Xin Liu	4:52
4.	"Flowing Heart" (流心)	Zhang Rui	Zhang Rui	Zhang Bichen	4:49
Total length:					16:37

=== Chapter 3: Heartbeat in Harmony (心动协奏) ===
No.	Title	Lyrics	Music	Performer(s)	Length
1.	"Missed Your Season"	Lu Zhuoyu	Kim Beom-ju, Cha Ye-oul	Curley Gao	3:51
2.	"Just One Step Away"	Josh C	Josh C	Liu Yu	3:08
3.	"How Time Takes Away Sadness"	Andy Chi	Hank Lin	Zhou Feige	4:28
4.	"Kind"	Peng Xuebin	Peng Xuebin	Wang Honghao	4:31
5.	"Lost in How You Shine"	Claire Chew, Tengyboy, Jon Chua	Claire Chew, Tengyboy, Jon Chua	Lars Huang	3:35
6.	"Stop Here"	Ray Hou, Wu Jiaqi, Yang Shangyi	Ray Hou	Hu Xia	3:54
7.	"Coming for You"	Hubert Ng, JYPHAN, Giryeon, JC Pang	Hubert Ng, JYPHAN, Giryeon, JC Pang	Zhang Hao	3:19
8.	"I Secretly Think of You All Day Long" (偷偷想你一整天)	Josh C	Josh C	Ke Lou	3:31
9.	"Two Way Love"	Josh C	Gao Minlun	Ke Lou	2:42
10.	"Uncontrollably"	Ray Hou	Ray Hou	Ray Hou	3:36
Total length:					36:00

== Release ==
Shine on Me premiered in Mainland China on December 22, 2025, as a streaming original on Tencent Video. The series, consisting of 36 episodes, followed a staggered release schedule where the final episodes were made available to SVIP and VIP subscribers on January 6, 2026. Internationally, the drama was distributed simultaneously across several major global platforms, including WeTV, iQIYI, and Rakuten Viki, allowing for a "day-and-date" release with English and multi-language subtitles. Netflix also secured the streaming rights for the series, premiering it on December 23, 2025, in various international territories, including Southeast Asia and North America. Additionally, the series was made available on Viu and TrueID for viewers in Southeast Asian markets, as well as on Studio Genie for South Korean digital audiences.

== Controversy ==
On January 3, 2026, the series was removed from the Netflix platform in Vietnam following a 24-hour directive issued by the Vietnamese Ministry of Culture, Sports and Tourism. The Department of Cinema identified multiple scenes in Episode 25 (occurring between minutes 32:10 and 34:03) that depicted a map featuring the nine-dash line, a representation of China's territorial claims in the South China Sea. The Vietnamese government stated that the inclusion of the map infringed upon national sovereignty, leading to the administrative order for the series to be pulled from domestic streaming services. The controversy stems from Beijing's requirement that all maps produced in China including those in media and entertainment display these maritime claims. The directive followed similar actions taken by Vietnam against other international media featuring the demarcation, which is not recognized by Vietnam or international tribunals.
