= Love O2O =

Love O2O may refer to:

- Love O2O (film), 2016 Chinese film
- Love O2O (TV series), 2016 Chinese TV series
