= Heyi Shengxiao Mo =

何以笙箫默, may refer to:

- My Sunshine, 2015 Chinese television series
- You Are My Sunshine, 2015 Chinese romantic drama film
