= Three Lives, Three Worlds, Ten Miles of Peach Blossoms =

Three Lives, Three Worlds, Ten Miles of Peach Blossoms may refer to:

- Eternal Love (Chinese TV series), a 2017 Chinese television series
- Once Upon a Time (2017 Chinese film)
