= The Tale of Chinese Medicine =

- Genre: Documentary
- Directed by: Gan Chao & Zhen Bo
- Country of origin: China
- Original language: Mandarin
- No. of episodes: 6

Production
- Running time: 40 minutes

Original release
- Network: Jiangsu Television
- Release: 20 May – 24 June 2016

The Tale of Chinese Medicine (Chinese: 本草中国; pinyin: Béncǎo Zhōngguó is a Chinese documentary television series on the culture and history of traditional Chinese medicine directed by Gan Chao (干超) and Zheng Bo (郑波). It first aired on May 20, 2016, on Jiangsu Television. This documentary which has six episodes introduces the culture and story of various herbs in China and get good reviews from the audience home and abroad.

== Background ==
With the development of modern medicine, traditional Chinese medicine has received more and more attention in the global medical community. However, many Chinese people still misunderstand traditional Chinese medicine, and they believe traditional Chinese medicine is outdated and isn't effective. The development of traditional Chinese medicine in China also faces many problems, such as resource destruction and lack of learners. Therefore, the director directed this documentary to help enhance the public's understanding of Chinese herbs and traditional Chinese medicine.

== Episodes ==
The series have six episodes, each which features stories of different kinds of herbs and their special usages as traditional Chinese medicine in clinical practice.

No.	Title	Original air date	Description
1	“Time” (时间)	May 20, 2016	The first episode introduces how time affects different medicinal herbs. The same herb has different pharmacodynamic effects because of different picking time.
2	“Year” (年华)	May 27, 2016	This episode shows that the difficult process of the development of growing and getting some Chinese valuable herbs.
3	“Double-sided” (双面)	June 3, 2016	This episode presents that some Chinese medicine have noxiousness but they are also very useful to treat some specific diseases.
4	“Ideal” (境界)	June 10, 2016	Chinese people pick and use herbs to make Chinese medicine. At the same time, they respect nature and try their best to preserve it.
5	“Renascence” (新生)	June 17, 2016	This episode deeply deciphers the scientific research road of the Nobel Prize-winning antimalarial new drug artemisinin, which is extracted from a kind of Chinese herbs and saves many people's lives around the world.
6	“Roots” (根源)	June 24, 2016	The last episode describes the roots of herbs. Different geographical environment breeds in different kinds of herbs.

== Reception ==
=== Awards ===
This documentary won the best series of documentary awards in humanities in the third "Golden Panda" International Documentary Festival.

The Chinese medicine culture documentary "The Tale of Chinese Medicine" was presented as the only Chinese medicine propaganda film on the 2nd Ministers Meeting Between China and CEEC.

=== Audience response ===
The Tale of Chinese Medicine attracted high ratings during its nightly airing with a discussion of more than 200 million viewers. It also has an overall approval rating of 85% on Douban.

Li Zhongzhi, director of the Propaganda Department of the State Administration of Radio, Film and Television, said at the seminar that "The Tale of Chinese Medicine" was regarded as a landmark work. It achieved such good ratings and reputation, and produced a very large demonstration effect.

== Books ==
The accompanying paperback book, The tale of Chinese Medicine, was published by Zhonghua Book Company in January, 2018 (ISBN 978-7101127942).

== Overseas ==
These series are created as an international version to sell overseas. The international version of this documentary is called“China's Amazing Super Herbs”and it is divided into four episodes: "A Band of Sisters", "Old Boys Club", "Super Foods", and "Wise Guides".
