= Gu Man =

Chinese novelist and screenwriter (born 1981)

- 顾漫
- Born: October 21, 1981 (age 44); Yixing, Jiangsu, China
- Education: Nanjing Audit University
- Occupations: Novelist, Screenwriter
- Writing career
- Period: 2003–present
- Genre: Romance
- Notable works: Silent Separation; Love O2O; Boss & Me; You Are My Glory

Gu Man (Chinese: 顾漫; born October 21, 1981) is a Chinese novelist and screenwriter. She is recognized as an influential author in the modern Chinese "sweet romance" (tian chong) genre. Born in Yixing, Jiangsu, she graduated from Nanjing Audit University.

Gu rose to prominence in 2005 with her debut serialized novel Silent Separation (He Yi Sheng Xiao Mo). Most of her novels have been adapted into television series, many of which she has personally scripted to ensure narrative consistency.

== Works ==
- Silent Separation (何以笙箫默) – First published in 2006.
- Love O2O (微微一笑很倾城) – First published in 2009.
- Boss & Me (杉杉来吃) – First published in 2011.
- Blazing Sunlight (骄阳似我) – Volume 1 published in 2013.
- You Are My Glory (你是我的荣耀) – First published in 2019.

== Filmography ==
=== Television ===
Year	English Title	Original Title	Screenwriter	Notes
2014	Boss & Me	杉杉来了	No	
2015	My Sunshine	何以笙箫默	Yes	Based on Silent Separation
2016	Love O2O	微微一笑很倾城	Yes	
2021	Cinderella is Online	シンデレラはオンライン中！	No	Japanese adaptation of Love O2O
2021	You Are My Glory	你是我的荣耀	Yes	
2021	Boss & Me	รักนี้คือเธอ	No	Thai adaptation
2025	Shine on Me	骄阳似我	Yes	

=== Film ===
Year	English Title	Chinese Title	Screenwriter	Notes
2015	You Are My Sunshine	何以笙箫默	No	Gu Man publicly disputed the copyright validity for this production.
2016	Love O2O	微微一笑很倾城	Yes	
