= Who Rules the World (TV series) =

2022 Chinese television series

- Promotional poster
- Also known as: Who Gets the World
- Traditional Chinese: 且試天下
- Simplified Chinese: 且试天下
- Hanyu Pinyin: Qiě Shì Tiānxià
- Genre: Wuxia; Fantasy; Romance
- Based on: Let's Try The World by Qing Lengyue
- Directed by: Yin Tao; Yu Yonggang; Shi Zhanli
- Starring: Yang Yang; Zhao Lusi
- Opening theme: "Unparalleled" by Liu Yuning
- Ending theme: "Breath of Wind" by Tiger Hu & Ye Xuanqing
- Country of origin: China
- Original language: Mandarin
- No. of episodes: 40

Production
- Executive producer: Han Zhijie
- Producers: Yang Xiaopei; Fang Fang
- Production location: Hengdian World Studios
- Running time: 45 minutes
- Production companies: Tencent Penguin Pictures; Xixi Pictures

Original release
- Network: Tencent Video
- Release: April 18 – May 17, 2022

Who Rules the World (Chinese: 且试天下; pinyin: Qiě Shì Tiānxià) is a 2022 Chinese streaming television series starring Yang Yang and Zhao Lusi. Based on the wuxia romance novel Let's Try The World by Qing Lengyue, it depicts the adventurous love story of Hei Fengxi and Bai Fengxi. The series premiered on Tencent Video and WeTV on April 18, 2022, and concluded on May 17, 2022 with a total of 40 episodes. It is also available for streaming on Netflix.

== Synopsis ==
Hei Feng Xi is chivalrous and elegant, while Bai Feng Xi is majestic and unrestrained. Opposites attract as both are unrivaled in talent and intellect. Caught in the warfare and chaos of the martial arts and political worlds, the flowers of love begin to bloom amidst the blood that has been sacrificed within the last decade. Trying to keep their identities hidden, they constantly have to be three steps ahead when dealing with much political unrest, betrayal, infighting, and the ultimate battle for the imperial throne.

== Cast and characters ==
=== Main ===
- Yang Yang as Hei Fengxi / Feng Lanxi
  - Liu Yiran as Feng Lanxi (young)

Head of Fountain Abode and second prince of Yongzhou

- Zhao Lusi as Bai Fengxi / Feng Xiyun
  - Zhang Xiwei as Bai Fengxi (young)

Disciple of Tian Shuang Sect and princess of Qingzhou

=== Supporting ===
==== Yongzhou ====
Fountain Abode / Lanxi residence

- Huang Yi as Zhong Li, Hei Fengxi's retainer
- Wang Xuan as Ren Chuanyu, Hei Fengxi's retainer
- Zhao Zhuoting as Ren Chuanyun, Hei Fengxi's guard
- Zhao Xin as Huan Niang, Lanxi residence's head maid

Royal Family

- Zhang Fengyi as Lord of Yongzhou
  - Liu Mengling as Lord of Yongzhou (young)
- Carman Lee as Queen Baili, Feng Chang and Feng Ju's birth mother
  - Qi Ge as Concubine Baili (young)
- Liu Ruilin as Feng Ju, third prince of Yongzhou. He is an ambitious man who wants to be the next ruler of Yongzhou. He is a sinister man who will do what it takes to achieve his goal including harming his brothers. Wang Yuan is his retainer before being replaced by Li Jia Xian.
- Zhang Tianyang as Feng Chang, eldest prince of Yongzhou. Due to having been adopted and raised by the late Queen of Yongzhou, regards Feng Lanxi as a true brother. He has a closer relationship with Feng Lanxi than with Feng Ju. Despite being biological brothers, current Queen Baili has never acknowledged her eldest son due to him being the weakest candidate for the heir position.
  - Chen Ziqi as Feng Chang (young)
- Meng Qin as Princess Yige, late Lady of Yongzhou, Emperor Chun Xi's sister and Feng Lanxi's birth mother

Others

- Jiang Baixuan as Ren Rusong, Chancellor of Yongzhou and Hei Fengxi's teacher
- Xuan Lu as Feng Qiwu, chief of Feng family and the Minister of Civil Service Affairs. Has a crush on Feng Lanxi.
- Jiang Feng as Yuan Lu, head eunuch
- Liu Xu as Zhang Zhongge Minister of Justice
- Fan Yining as Wang Yuan, Feng Ju's retainer. Was beheaded due to plotting and causing Feng Lanxi's boating accident. Was planted by Feng Ju's side by Step-Lady Baili.
- Zhou Yao as Li Jiaxian Retainer sent to Step-Lady Baili's side by Feng Ju as a double agent.

==== Qingzhou ====
Tian Shuang Sect

- Jiang Kai as Bai Jiande, head of Tian Shuang sect and Bai Fengxi's teacher
- Ai Mi as Bai Langhua, Bai Jiande's daughter and disciple of Tian Shuang sect. Love interest of Xiu Jiurong.
- Wang Hongyi as Xiu Jiurong, disciple of Tian Shuang sect, rescued as a boy by Bai Fengxi. Love interest of Bai Langhua.
- Lu Zhan Xiang as Han Pu, young master of the Han family and adopted brother of Bai Fengxi
  - Fu Bo Han as Han Pu (young)
- Zhang Ruicheng as Gu Yu, 2nd disciple of Tian Shuang sect. Resents Bai Fengxi as Acting Leader and breaks several Sect rules. Died via poison while in prison after being manipulated to kill a high official.

Royal Family

- Ma Yue as Lord of Qingzhou and father of Bai Fengxi
- Li Jiulin as Feng Xieyue, prince of Qingzhou and brother of Bai Fengxi

==== Jizhou ====
- Leon Lai Yi as Huang Chao, prince of Jizhou, one of the Four Gentlemen
- Zhang Haowei as Yu Wuyuan, Huang Chao's advisor, one of the Four Gentlemen
- Leng Jiyuan as Xiao Xuekong, general Sao Xue
- He Kailang as Yan Yingzhou, general Lie Feng and head of the four generals of Ji Continent
- Cui Tianyi as Huang Yu, princess of Jizhou
- Yang Qing Zhu as Qiu Jiu Shuang, Huang Chao's subordinate

Others

- Henry Zhao as Ma Meng Qi Chief of Expert Military Horse Training Family

==== Da Dong ====
- Du Zhiguo as Emperor Chun Xi, emperor of Da Dong
- Yi Daqian as Jing Yan, crown prince of Da Dong
- Lu Yong as Dong Shufang, general of Da Dong
- Feng Ming Jing as Eunuch Hu, Eunuch in the Imperial Apothecary and is the Supreme Physician in the Imperial City black market

==== Youzhou ====
- An Yuexi as Hua Chunran, princess of Youzhou
  - Xing Yunjia as Hua Chunran (young)
- Wang Gang as Lord of Youzhou
- Du Zhao as Hua Chunyuan, prince of Youzhou

==== Shangzhou ====
- He Yong Sheng as Lord of Shangzhou
- Wei Jin Song as Liu Changxiu, Eunuch

Extra

- Kai Wang (Extra)

== Production ==
The filming of Who Rules The World started in Hengdian World Studios and the opening ceremony was held on February 3, 2021. Zhao Lusi participated in the opening ceremony, while Yang Yang was absent due to other schedules. On February 23, 2021, Yang Yang joined the group to start filming. On April 8, 2021, the official Weibo of "Who Rules The World" announced the lineup and released the final posters of the lead cast. The shooting of whole drama was completed on June 17, 2021.

== Reception ==
The series surpassed 1 billion views on Tencent Video, eleven days after its release.

== Soundtrack ==
Who Rules the World OST (且试天下 电视原声大碟) consisted of 5 tracks sung by various artists and 20 background scores composed by Dong Dongdong

No.	Title	Lyrics	Music	Singers	Length
1.	"Unparalleled (无双)" (Opening theme song)	Chen Lingzi	Xu Lin	Liu Yuning
2.	"Breath of Wind (风息)" (Ending theme song)	Zhang Jingyi	Liu Xuandou	Tiger Hu & Ye Xuanqing
3.	"A Dream Come True (一梦浮生)"	Chen Xi	Dong Dongdong, Chen Xi	Silence Wang
4.	"All In (孤注)"			Tan Weiwei
5.	"Like a Dream (如梦)"			Lai Meiyun
6.	"Who Rules the World OST Full Album (且试天下 电视剧原声带)"			Liu Yuning, Tiger Hu, Ye Xuanqing, Silence Wang, Tan Weiwei & Lai Meiyun

== International broadcast ==
Network	Country	Ref.
AsiaN	South Korea	
LaLa TV	Japan	
BS11	Japan	
TVQ	Japan (Fukuoka Prefecture) Fukuoka	
WeTV	International	
Netflix	International	
RTHK	(Hong Kong) Hongkong	
8TV	Malaysia	

Who Rules The World was one of the selected dramas broadcast in Hong Kong on September 1, 2022 via TV channel RHTK 31, in commemoration of Hong Kong Special Administrative Region's 25th Anniversary (National Liberation Day).

On July 24, 2022, Who Rules the World ranked 4th in Netflix Korea’s Top 10 Most Viewed Series, the only foreign show to have made it on the list.

As at end of 2022, Who Rules the World ranked first in Netflix's Chinese dramas (including Mainland China, Hong Kong and Taiwan) with a score of 3168. It is included in the Netflix Top 10 Series in 16 countries. It is also the only chinese drama to have ever entered the Netflix Top 100 Global so far.

On January 15, 2025, the Japanese television station TVQ began broadcasting "Who Rules the World."

== Awards and nominations ==
Year	Award	Category	Nominee	Result	Ref.
2021	China International Youth Film Festival	Most Anticipated Costume Drama	Who Rules the World	Won	
2022	Golden Guduo Film and Television Festival Awards 2021	Most Anticipated Costume Drama	Who Rules the World	Won	
2022	AsiaN Editors Pick Awards	Foreigners’ Most Mentioned Award	Who Rules the World	Won	
2022	Tencent Video Golden Goose Awards	Annual Audience Favorite Series	Who Rules the World	Won	
2022	Datawin Prosperity Awards	Excellent Business Award	Who Rules the World	Won	
2022	13th Macau International TV Festival	Best Actor	Yang Yang	Nominated	
2022	13th Macau International TV Festival	Best Supporting Actor	Zhang Feng Yi	Nominated	
2022	13th Macau International TV Festival	Best Supporting Actress	Carman Lee	Nominated	
2023	Beijing News Annual Drama Comprehensive List	Best IP Adaptation Drama of the Year	Who Rules the World	Won	
2023	The Annual Ceremony of Cultural Responsibility & Influence 2023	The Annual Web Drama	Who Rules the World	Won	
