= Semir (company) =

Chinese fast fashion clothing company

WanJiang South China Mall shop clothing in December 2024

Zhejiang Semir Garment Co., Ltd, is a leading Chinese multi-brand listed garment company focused on fast fashion retail business of casual wear and children’s wear with two major brands—SEMIR and balabala.was founded by Qiu Guanghe in the province of Wenzhou, China on December 18, 1996.

== About ==
Today the company has over than 4,000 employees, operates a sales network with more than 7000 standalone stores in China and over 12 countries and regions and became publicity listed on Shenzhen Stock Exchange in 2011.

The company has gained a sustainable and steady growth in the recent years. In 2019, the company has achieved revenue of approximately 2.798 billion dollars and profit of 311 million dollars.

Semir Group has been shortlisted for the top ten profit and sales in China's clothing industry and the top 500 private enterprises in China for many years.

== History ==
1996: The Semir was founded in Wenzhou

1997: The Semir brand casual wear opened the first store in Jiangsu province

2002: Semir launched balabala, the new kids clothes brand of the company

2006: The Semir brand was successively awarded the titles of "China Famous Brand" and "China Famous Trademark", and was listed among the top 10 competitiveness of China's garment industry

2006: On the occasion of the 10th anniversary of Semir's establishment, Semir group invested 20 million yuan to establish Semir Charity Fund, which is used to help disadvantaged groups in society and enterprises who encounter difficulties

2010: Semir Group donated 3 million yuan to Yushu disaster area and donated 2 million yuan of clothing

2011: Zhejiang Semir Garment Co., Ltd was listed on the SME board of the Shenzhen Stock Exchange

2012: Semir Group established Zhejiang Semir E-commerce Company in Hangzhou.

2013: Semir Group became the general agent of German brand Marc O'Polo clothing products in China

2017: The group began the international expansion, with opening its first foreign store in Saudi Arabia, Riyadh

2019: The annual sales of Semir group exceeded 2.9 billion USD, the number of stores reached more than 7.000

2020: Semir Group donates 10 million yuan to support the fight against the Covid-19 pandemic

2021: Semir and balabala brand continue global expansion and enters new markets of: Nepal, Vietnam, Qatar, Dubai, Macao and Cambodia, trading in more than 25 countries and regions

== Notable brand endorsers ==
- Han Geng (2009)
- Choi Siwon (2009)
- Show Lo (2009)
- Super Junior-M (2009-2010)
- Lee Min-ho (2012-2014)
- Kim Soo-hyun (2014-2015)
- Lee Jong-suk (2014-2016)
- Minah (2014-2016)
- Yura (2014-2016)
- Kim Woo-bin (2015-2017)
- Yang Yang (2016-2018)
