= Yang Yang (actor) =

Chinese actor (born 1991)

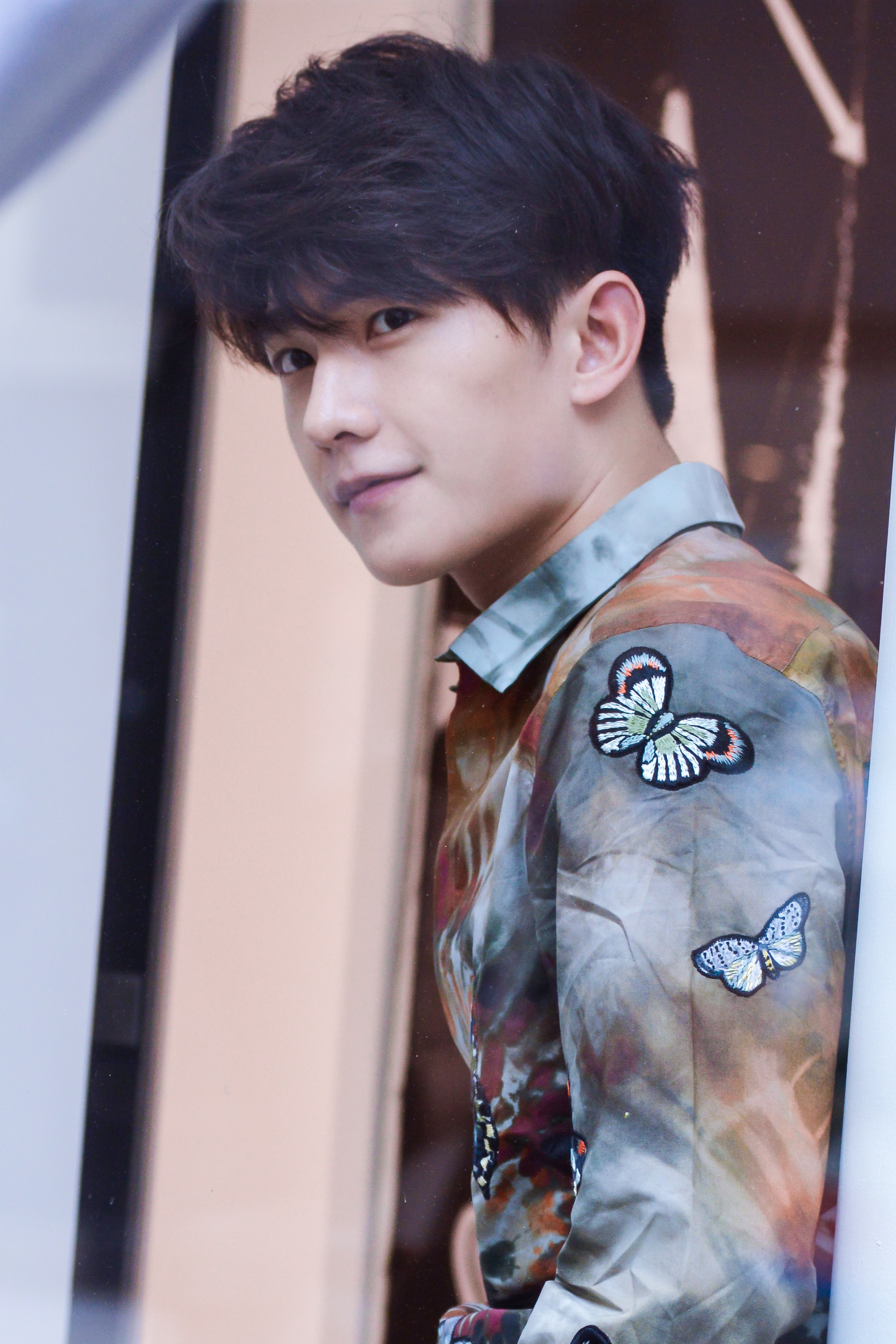
- Yang in 2016
- Born: September 9, 1991 (age 35); Shanghai, China
- Education: People's Liberation Army Academy of Art; The Central Academy of Drama
- Occupations: Actor; singer; dancer; model
- Years active: 2010–present
- Agent(s): Rosat Entertainment; Yuekai Entertainment
- Height: 180 cm (5 ft 11 in)

Chinese name
- Traditional Chinese: 楊洋
- Simplified Chinese: 杨洋
Transcriptions
Standard Mandarin
- Hanyu Pinyin: Yáng Yáng
- Website: Yang Yang‘s Weibo

Yang Yang (simplified Chinese: 杨洋; traditional Chinese: 楊洋, born September 9, 1991) is a Chinese actor. He is known as one of the "Big Four" or "Four Major Traffic Stars" alongside Li Yifeng, Lu Han and Kris Wu, due to their immense popularity and influence in mainland China. He made his acting debut in the Chinese television drama The Dream of Red Mansions (2010). Since then, he has received recognition for his roles in television dramas The Lost Tomb (2015), The Whirlwind Girl (2015), Love O2O (2016), Martial Universe (2018), The King's Avatar (2019), You Are My Glory (2021), Glory of Special Forces (2022), Who Rules The World (2022), Fireworks of My Heart (2023), The Immortal Ascension (2025) and films The Left Ear (2015), I Belonged to You (2016), Once Upon a Time (2017), Vanguard (2020).

He was ranked 5th on the 2017 Forbes China Celebrity 100 list, 27th in 2019 and 44th in 2020. He was China's first Olympic flame torch bearer for the Rio Olympic Games in Greece, on April 22, 2016. He also became the first artist to be featured on the China Post postage stamp in January 2016.

== Early life ==
Yang Yang was born in Shanghai and studied dance since he was a child. In 2003, Yang Yang applied for the People's Liberation Army Academy of Art and Shanghai Dance Academy at the same time. At the young age of 12, he decided to enrollee in the Department of Dance in People's Liberation Army Academy of Art in Beijing China. He also studied at the Central Academy of Drama for a period of time. Yang was a soldier with excellent character and study during his school years. In the second year of admission, he won the first place in his major and participated in international and domestic dance competitions on behalf of the school many times. At that time, his dream was to be a professional dancer. In 2007, Yang performed the solo dance "Dandelion" at the graduation ceremony of Nanjing Military Region.

== Career ==
=== 2007–2014: Beginning ===
Before the Spring Festival in 2007, the crew of Li Shaohong's version of Dream of Red Mansions selected 15 candidate actors from the People's Liberation Army Academy of Art, and initially confirmed that 6 actors, including Yang Yang, participated in the collective training. At this time, he was preparing for the graduation report ceremony of the Nanjing Military Region and participating in the international dance competition, so he could not participate in the group training. Subsequently, under the coordination of many parties, he received separate training from the crew. After two months of professional training, at 16, he was selected by director Li Shaohong to become the actor of the adult Jia Baoyu in Dream of Red Mansions, thus entering the film and television industry. This series was one of the most expensive Chinese TV series produced at RMB118 million (US$17.55 million), the 50-episode drama premiered on July 6, 2010.

In 2011, Yang featured in The Founding of a Party, a patriotic tribute detailing the process of establishing the Chinese Communist Party. He continued to build up his filmography, featuring in war dramas The War Doesn't Believe in Tears (2012) and Ultimate Conquest (2013), and romance series Flowers Pinellia (2013). On April 29, 2014, Yang ended his contract of 7 years with his company Rosat Entertainment.

=== 2015–2016: Rising popularity, breakthrough and continued success ===
In 2015, Yang started to gain recognition for his performance in The Left Ear, a coming-of-age film which is also the directorial debut of Alec Su. The film was a box-office hit, and Yang received positive for his performance as Xu Yi. The box office crossed over 484.42 million yuan. He then participated in travel-reality show Divas Hit the Road Season 2 which was a huge topic online when it aired and helped Yang top the "2015 Chinese Reality Show Star Ranking". He next starred in action-adventure web-drama The Lost Tomb based on the novel of the same name. The Lost Tomb was the most watched web drama of the year with 2.8 billion views, and Yang gained acclaim from novel fans and audience for his portrayal of Zhang Qiling. Yang then played the male lead in youth sports drama The Whirlwind Girl, which gained one of the highest viewership ratings of the year, with over 5 billion views. He also released his first single, "Tender Love". At the end of the year, Yang won several awards including the Most Popular Actor of the Year at iQiyi All-Star Carnival; and the Most Talked About Actor and Most Influential Actor awards at the China TV Drama Awards.

In 2016, Yang appeared in CCTV New Year's Gala for the first time, where his song item "Father and Son" alongside Tong Tiexin was voted the most popular program. He starred in youth romance drama Love O2O, based on Gu Man's novel of the same name. The drama was an international hit, and is the most viewed modern drama in China, the series gained over 28.64 billion views. Following the airing of Love O2O, Yang experienced a huge surge in popularity and successfully broke into the mainstream. To thank his fans, Yang released the song "Love is Crazy", a jazz/rock single. He next starred in romance film I Belonged to You, which was a huge success and broke the box-office sales record of 813 million yuan for mainland-produced romance films. He was named as one of the Top 10 Chinese celebrities with most commercial value by CBN Weekly.

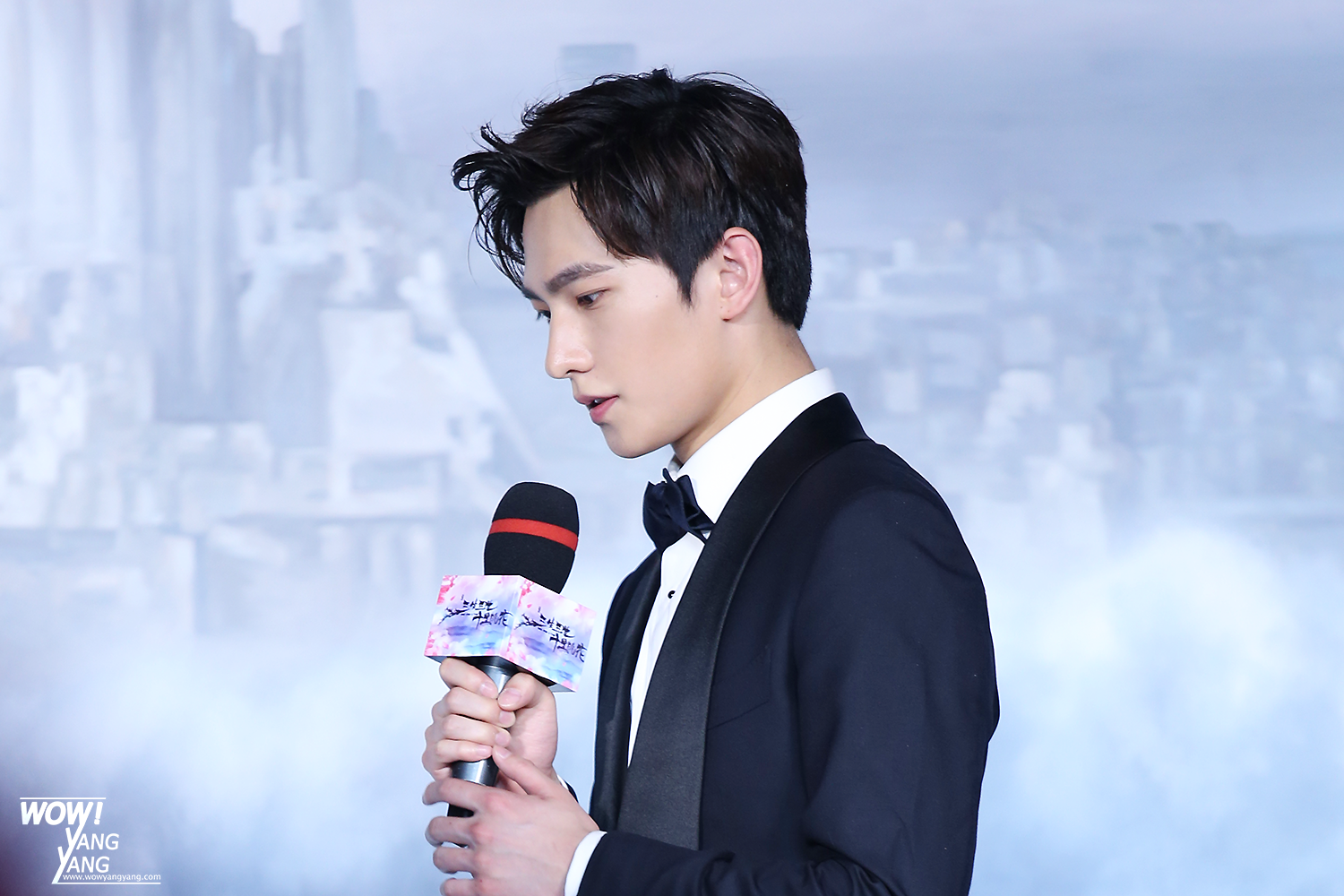
Yang at Once Upon a Time press conference in 2017

In 2017, Yang starred alongside Liu Yifei in fantasy romance film Once Upon a Time. Box office crossed 535 million yuan. Forbes China listed Yang under their 30 Under 30 Asia 2017 list which consisted of 30 influential people under 30 years old who have had a substantial effect in their fields. In 2018, Yang starred in the fantasy action drama Martial Universe and achieved over 8 billion views. In 2019, Yang played the leading role Ye Xiu in the eSports drama The King's Avatar. The series The King’s Avatar was reported as the most profitable series by Tencent in 2019 and surpassed 4.32 billion views. In 2020, Yang starred in action film Vanguard alongside Jackie Chan, box office crossed 294.26 million yuan. In 2021, Yang was cast in You Are My Glory as Yu Tu, an aerospace engineer. As a much-anticipated drama due to popularity of its original work (novel of the same name), this show has successfully gathered a total of 5.14 billion views. This show also won the Tencent Business Breakthrough award in 2021.

In 2022, a drama based on military genre, Glory of the Special Forces (directed by Xu Jizhou) cast him as the lead role Yan Poyue. The series Glory of the Special Forces contributed to a market share of 34.11% and with the highest overall rating of 1.006% in recent years for any military series, the series exceeded 2.6 billion views. In the same year, Yang starred in the wuxia fantasy romance drama titled Who Rules the World as Feng Lanxi, based on the novel by Qing Lengyue. The only foreign show to rank 4th in Netflix Korea's Top 10 Most viewed series on July 24, 2022, achieved 4.44 billion views on Tencent.

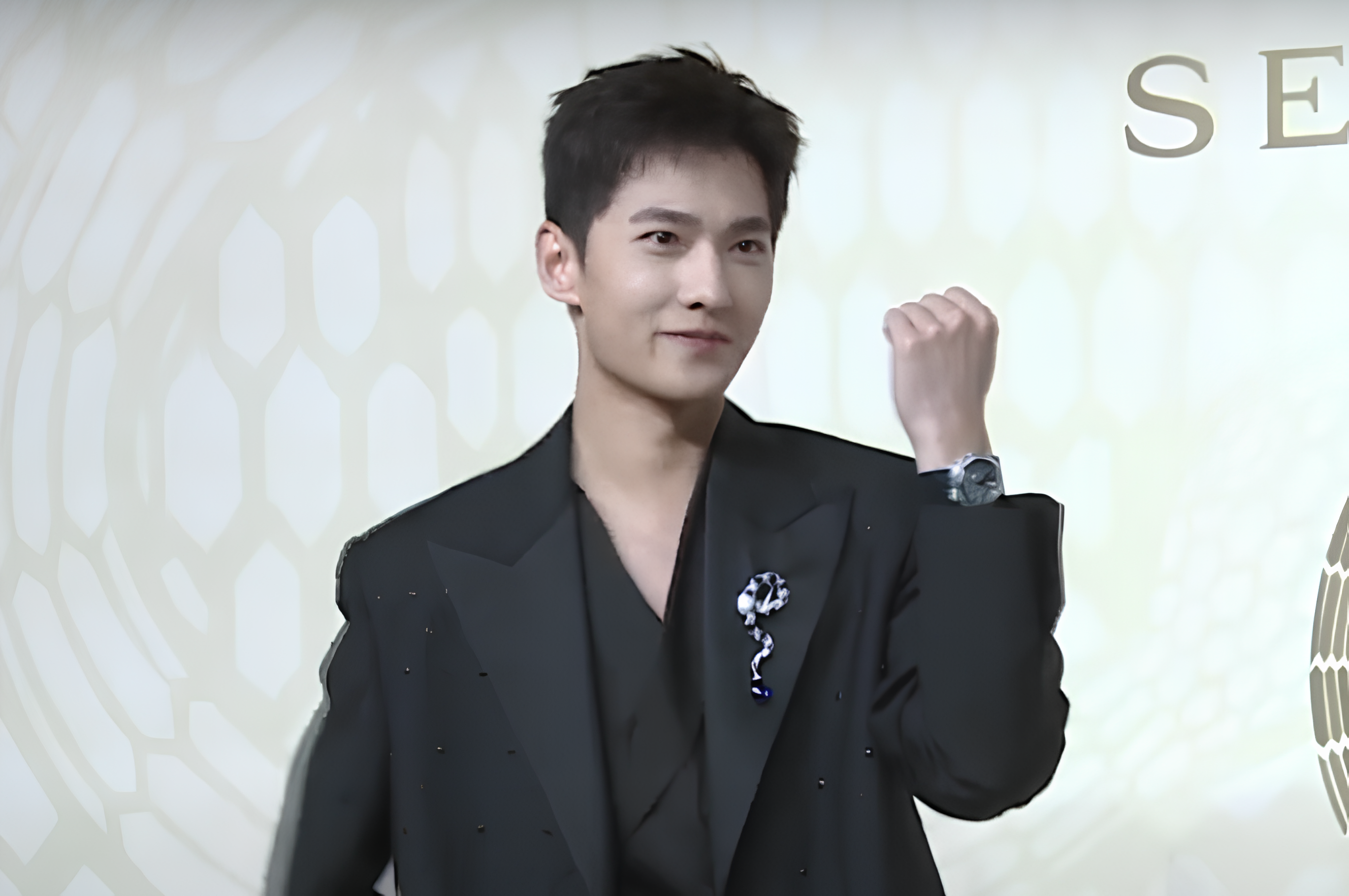
Yang at the Bvlgari Serpenti 75 Years of Infinite Tales exhibition in Shanghai in March 2023

Yang starred in the action romance drama Fireworks of My Heart adapted from the web novel Waiting for You in a City by Jiu Yue Xi. He played the lead role as Song Yan, Chief of the Shilitai Fire Station. The series was broadcast on July 5, 2023 on Mango TV and Hunan TV, the series surpassed 3.16 billion views. On September 15, 2024, he starred in the series Zhan Zhao Adventures. On July 27, 2025, the ancient costume drama The Immortal Ascension was broadcast on Youku. The series exceeded 10254 index and achieved 2 billion views.

== Other activities ==
On February 19, 2017, Yang had his wax figure displayed at Madam Tussauds Shanghai. His second wax figure was displayed at Madame Tussauds Beijing on July 19, 2017.

== Endorsements ==
Year	Brand	Title	Ref.
2015	RIO Cocktail	Brand Spokesperson	
2015	Sony Headphones	Brand Spokesperson	
2015	iQIYI VIP	Brand Spokesperson	
2015	Rejoice	Brand Spokesperson	
2015	Be & Cherry	Brand Spokesperson	
2015	Master Kong Iced Tea	Brand Spokesperson	
2015	Master Kong Jasmine Tea	Brand Spokesperson	
2016	Guerlain	Global Brand Spokesperson	
2016	OPPO	Brand Spokesperson	
2016	Quaker	Brand Spokesperson	
2016	Semir	Brand Spokesperson	
2016	A Chinese Ghost Story Game	Brand Spokesperson	
2016	Watsons	Brand Spokesperson	
2016	Ariel	Brand Spokesperson	
2016	HP	Brand Spokesperson	
2016	Colgate	Brand Spokesperson	
2016	Lays	Brand Spokesperson	
2016	Baidu Maps	Brand Spokesperson	
2016	Luolai	Brand Spokesperson	
2016	Suning.com	Brand Spokesperson	
2016	Roseonly	Brand Spokesperson	
2016	Yong Heroes Game	Brand Spokesperson	
2016	Sohu News	Brand Spokesperson	
2017	PUMA	Brand Spokesperson	
2017	Puppy Electrical Appliances	Brand Spokesperson	
2017	Didi Chuxing	Brand Spokesperson	
2017	Yves Saint Laurent Glasses	Asia Pasific Ambassador	
2017	Qzone	Brand Spokesperson	
2017	Yida	Brand Spokesperson	
2017	Platinum	Brand Spokesperson	
2017	Meituan	Brand Spokesperson	
2017	Shanghai Pudong Development Bank Credit Card	Brand Spokesperson	
2017	Daily Photo APP	Brand Spokesperson	
2017	Montblanc	Brand Spokesperson	
2017	Tencent Video VIP	Brand Spokesperson	
2018	Douyin	Chief Product Officer	
2018	Tousu	Brand Spokesperson	
2018	GODIVA	Brand Spokesperson	
2018	Pepsi	Brand Spokesperson	
2018	Alfa Romeo	Brand Spokesperson	
2018	China Literature IP	Brand Spokesperson	
2018	QQ Book	Brand Spokesperson	
2019	Vaseline	Brand Spokesperson	
2019	Shuixing	Brand Spokesperson	
2019	Fuguang	Brand Spokesperson	
2019	SKG Massager	Brand Spokesperson	
2019	ALLIE	Brand Spokesperson	
2020	Purjoy	Brand Spokesperson	
2020	Fantasy Westward Journey PC Version	Brand Spokesperson	
2020	Mercedes-Benz	Brand Spokesperson	
2020	Fantasy Westward Journey 3D Edition	Brand Spokesperson	
2020	RIBECS	Brand Spokesperson	
2020	Lifebuoy	Global Brand Spokesperson	
2020	Wang Chai	Brand Spokesperson	
2020	PARIM	Brand Spokesperson	
2020	Dunhill	Global Brand Spokesperson	
2021	Fantasy Westward Journey Web Version	Brand Spokesperson	
2021	HOGAN	Global Brand Spokesperson	
2021	Tencent Video	Brand Spokesperson	
2021	Meifubao	Brand Spokesperson	
2021	Chandon	Brand Spokesperson	
2021	Little Dream Garden	Brand Spokesperson	
2021	WeTV	Global Brand Spokesperson	
2021	Moon Shadow Home	Brand Spokesperson	
2021	Bvlgari	Brand Spokesperson	
2021	EVE LOM	Brand Spokesperson	
2021	Sleemon	Brand Spokesperson	
2021	Wedgwood	Brand Spokesperson	
2021	Tim Hortons	Brand Spokesperson	
2021	A1 Snack Lab	Brand Spokesperson	
2021	BOGNER	Brand Spokesperson	
2022	L'Oréal Hair	Brand Spokesperson	
2022	Tsingtao	Brand Spokesperson	
2022	Nutro	Brand Spokesperson	
2022	Pejoy	Brand Spokesperson	
2022	Panasonic	Brand Spokesperson	
2022	Caltrate	Brand Spokesperson	
2022	Sennheiser	Brand Spokesperson	
2022	Coca-Cola	Global Brand Spokesperson	
2022	Jin Chen Tea	Brand Spokesperson	
2022	L'Oréal Men Expert	Brand Spokesperson	
2022	CeraVe	Brand Spokesperson	
2023	Bvlgari Fragrance	Asia Pasific Spokesperson	
2023	SHE LOG	Brand Spokesperson	
2023	Cat Keeper Game	Brand Spokesperson	
2023	HONOR	Global Brand Spokesperson	
2023	Samsonite	Brand Spokesperson	
2023	Valentino	Brand Spokesperson	
2024	Atelier Cologne	Brand Spokesperson	
2025	A Chinese Ghost Story Game	Brand Spokesperson	
2025	LuckHaha	Global Brand Spokesperson	
2025	Youku	VIP's Chief Cool Recommendation Officer	
2025	Douyin Life Service	Brand Spokesperson	
2025	Baidu Maps	Brand Spokesperson	
2026	Chow Tai Fook	Global Brand Spokesperson	
2026	Nowwa Coffee	Global Brand Spokesperson	
2026	Voyah	Global Brand Spokesperson	
2026	Qianrengang	Global Brand Spokesperson	

== Filmography ==
=== Film ===
Year	English title	Chinese title	Role	Notes	Ref.
2011	The Founding of a Party	建党伟业	Yang Kaizhi	Support Role	
2012	Joyful Reunion	饮食男女2012	Shizhe (young)	Support Role	
2015	The Unbearable Lightness of Inspector Fan	暴走神探	Zhanshi Wu	Support Role	
2015	The Left Ear	左耳	Xu Yi	Main Role	
2016	I Belonged to You	从你的全世界路过	Mao Shiba	Main Role	
2017	Once Upon a Time	三生三世十里桃花	Ye Hua	Main Role	
2020	Vanguard	急先锋	Lei Zhen Yu	Main Role	

=== Television series ===
Year	English title	Chinese title	Role	Notes	Networks	Ref.
2010	The Dream of Red Mansions	红楼梦	Jia Baoyu	Main Role		
2011	Youth Melody	青春旋律	Ning Hao	Support Role	Youku	
2012	The War Doesn't Believe in Tears	战争不相信眼泪	Du Changyou	Main Role	Tencent, iQIYI, Youku	
2012	Refresh 3+7	刷新3+7	He Tianze	Support Role	Tencent Video, Youku	
2013	Legend of Goddess Luo	新洛神	Cao Zhi	Main Role	Tencent Video, Youku	
2013	Ultimate Conquest	武间道	Bai Niansheng	Main Role	Tencent, iQIYI	
2013	Flowers Pinellia	花开半夏	Lu Yuan	Main Role	Youku	
2014	Lanterns	花灯满城	Fei Yu	Support role	Tencent	
2014	Tiny Times	小时代之折纸时代	Neil	Support Role	Youku	
2015	The Four	少年四大名捕	Wu Qing	Main Role	Mango TV	
2015	The Lost Tomb	盗墓笔记	Zhang Qiling	Main Role	iQIYI, Mango TV	
2015	The Whirlwind Girl Season 1	旋风少女	Ruo Bai	Main Role	Youku, Mango TV	
2016	The Whirlwind Girl (season 2)	旋风少女第二季	Ruo Bai	Cameo	Mango TV	
2016	Love O2O	微微一笑很倾城	Xiao Nai	Main Role	Youku, Mango TV, Netflix	
2016	My Adorable Husband	我的蠢萌老公	Yang Kang	Main Role	iQIYI	
2018	The Chronicles of Town Called Jian	茧镇奇缘	Huang Moru	Main Role	MangoTV	
2018	Martial Universe (seasons 1 & 2)	武动乾坤	Lin Dong	Main Role	Youku	
2019	The King's Avatar	全职高手	Ye Xiu / Ye Qiu	Main Role	Tencent Video, Netflix	
2020	With You	在一起	Yue Bin	Segment: "Peers"		
2021	You Are My Glory	你是我的荣耀	Yu Tu	Main Role	Tencent Video, iQIYI	
2022	Glory of Special Forces	特战荣耀	Yan Poyue	Main Role	Tencent Video, iQIYI, Zhejiang Satellite TV, Dragon TV	
2022	Who Rules the World	且试天下	Feng Lanxi / Hei Fengxi	Main Role	Tencent Video, Netflix	
2023	Fireworks of My Heart	我的人间烟火	Song Yan	Main Role	MangoTV, Hunan TV	
2025	The Immortal Ascension	凡人修仙传	Han Li	Main Role	Youku, Netflix (Taiwan), Zhejiang Satellite TV, Shenzhen Satellite TV, Southeast Television	
2026	Zhan Zhao Adventures	雨霖铃	Zhan Zhao	Main Role	Youku, CCTV-8, Zhejiang Satellite TV, Disney + (Taiwan)	
TBA	Not Yielding The Kingdom	不让江山	Li Chi	Main Role	Tencent Video	

=== Short film ===
Year	English title	Chinese title	Ref.
2016	Searching for the Legend of Nian	寻年传说	
2016	Be and Cherry Eating Show	百草味演吃会	
2016	Healing Island	治愈之岛	
2016	Jasmine Flowers	茉等花开	
2016	My VR Boyfriend	我的VR男友	
2016	I Am Your Yang Yang Phone	我是你的咩咩phone	
2016	The Smile of Yi Q	衣q博士的微微一笑	
2017	Travel Through an Alluring Smile	穿越笑倾城	
2017	The Magical Journey of Liliput	小人国奇幻之旅	
2017	Love of Jasmine	茉莉之恋	
2017	Love Toward and Death and Reborn	爱向死而生	
2017	Protect and Never Let Go	守护不放	
2018	Music For Jasmine True Love Confession	音为茉莉 真情告白	
2019	Star Picked	摘星者	
2019	1970, I Am The Main Character	70年，我是主角	

=== Variety shows ===
Year	English title	Chinese title	Role	Network	Ref.
2013	Star Soldier	防务精英之星兵报到	Cast member	Beijing TV	
2015	Divas Hit the Road (Season 2)	花儿与少年	Cast member	Hunan TV	
2020	The Irresistible	元气满满的哥哥	Cast member	Hunan TV	
2021	Youth Periplous (Season 3)	青春环游记	Cast member	Zhejiang TV	

=== Music video appearances ===
Year	English title	Chinese title	Singer	Ref.
2010	"Granting Me a Red Mansions Dream"	许我一个红楼梦	Lin Shen	
2017	"For My 17-year-old Self"	给17岁的自己	Secret Fruit cast	

=== Theatre ===
Year	English title	Chinese title	Role	Ref.
2009	The Dream of Red Mansions	红楼梦	Jia Baoyu	

== Discography ==
=== Singles ===
Year	English title	Chinese title	Album	Notes	Ref.
2011	"Dandelion"	蒲公英	Melody of Youth OST	with Zhou Mi, Ma Su, Jiang Mengjie & Su Qing	
2015	"Fly with a Carefree Heart"	放心去飞	The Left Ear OST	with Oho Ou & Hu Xia	
2015	"Divas Hit the Road"	花儿与少年	Divas Hit the Road OST		
2015	"Tender Love"	安心的温柔			
2016	"Summer's Smooth Hair Dance"	夏日顺发舞		Promotional song for the shampoo brand Rejoice	
2016	"One Smile is very Beautiful"	微微一笑很倾城	Love O2O OST		
2016	"Love Is Crazy"	爱是一个疯字			
2016	"Sunshine in the Eyes"	瞳孔里的太阳		Promotional single for the 2016 World AIDS Day	
2016	"Father and Son"	父子		with Tong Tiexin	
2017	“Three Lifetimes, Ten Miles of Peach Blossoms"	三生三世十里桃花	Once Upon a Time OST	with Liu Yifei	
2017	"Just Like IDOL"	就象是IDOL			
2017	"Power of Love"	爱的力量		Charity song for Sunshine Special Fund	
2018	"My Spring Gala My Year"	我的春晚我的年		Performance for CCTV New Year's Gala	
2018	"The Best"	最好			
2018	"Forever Young"	永远年轻			

== Accolades ==
=== Awards and nominations ===
Year	Event	Category	Nominated work	Result	Ref.
2009	4th BQ Celebrity Score Awards	Newcomer Award	—N/a	Won	
2010	The Mango TV Fans Festival	Best Couple	The Dream of Red Mansions	Won	
2011	China Power Awards	Most Beautiful New Star	—N/a	Won	
2011	Sohu Entertainment Awards	New Face	—N/a	Won	
2015	Baidu Tieba Fans Carnival	Best Trending Artist	—N/a	Won	
2015	Bazaar Men of the Year Awards	Most Attractive Star of the Year	—N/a	Won	
2015	Chinese Campus Art Glory Festival	Most Popular Actor	The Four	Won	
2015	4th iQiyi All-Star Carnival	Most Popular Actor of the Year	The Lost Tomb	Won	
2015	8th China TV Drama Awards	Most Talked About Actor	—N/a	Won	
2015	8th China TV Drama Awards	Most Influential Actor in the Media	—N/a	Won	
2016	L'Officiel Night	Most Popular Actor	—N/a	Won	
2016	Baidu Moments Press Conference	Most Commercially Valuable Male Artist	—N/a	Won	
2016	13th Esquire Man At His Best Awards	Most Commercially Valuable Artist	—N/a	Won	
2016	Sohu Fashion Awards	Most Popular Male Celebrity	—N/a	Won	
2016	Youku Young Choice Awards	Artist of the Year	—N/a	Won	
2016	Youku Young Choice Awards	2016 UC Headlines Figure	—N/a	Won	
2017	2nd China Television Drama Quality Ceremony	Most Popular Quality Actor	Love O2O	Won	
2017	Chinese Communist Youth League (CCYL)	May 4 Medal	—N/a	Won	
2017	14th Esquire Man At His Best Awards	Man of the Year	—N/a	Won	
2017	14th Esquire Man At His Best Awards	Artist of the Year	—N/a	Won	
2017	11th Tencent Video Star Awards	VIP Star of the Year	—N/a	Won	
2018	12th Tencent Video Star Awards	VIP Star of the Year	—N/a	Won	
2018	Youku Choice Awards	Most Valuable Star	—N/a	Won	
2018	China Youth Day Gala	Outstanding Young Actor	—N/a	Won	
2018	Chinese Communist Youth League (CCYL)	Outstanding Youth	—N/a	Won	
2018	15th Esquire Man At His Best Awards	Outstanding Mainland Artist	—N/a	Won	
2018	Golden Data Entertainment Awards	Most Commercial Endorsement Male Artist	—N/a	Won	
2019	China Entertainment Industry Summit (Golden Pufferfish Awards)	Most Commercially Valuable Artist	—N/a	Won	
2019	Golden Bud - The Fourth Network Film And Television Festival	Best Actor	The King's Avatar	Nominated	
2019	China Newsweek	Person of the Year	—N/a	Won	
2019	Tencent Video All Star Awards	VIP Star	—N/a	Won	
2019	Tencent Video All Star Awards	TV Actor of the Year	The King's Avatar	Won	
2020	7th The Actors of China Award Ceremony	Best Actor (Web series)	The King's Avatar	Nominated	
2020	Tencent Video All Star Awards	VIP Star	—N/a	Won	
2022	13th Macau International TV Festival	Best Actor	Who Rules The World	Nominated	
2023	The Annual Ceremony of Cultural Responsibility & Influence 2023	Screen Influential Male Character	Glory of Special Forces	Won	
2023	China Television Drama Quality Ceremony 2023	Quality Influential Drama Star	Glory of Special Forces	Won	

=== Forbes China Celebrity 100 ===
Year	Rank	Ref.
2017	5th	
2019	27th	
2020	44th	
