= Leon Lai Yi =

Chinese actor

Lai Yi
- Born: 29 November 1990 (age 35); Ganzhou, Jiangxi, China
- Other name: Leon
- Education: Beijing Film Academy
- Occupation: Actor
- Years active: 2015–present
- Agent: Jay Walk Studio

Chinese name
- Traditional Chinese: 賴藝
- Simplified Chinese: 赖艺
Transcriptions
Standard Mandarin
- Hanyu Pinyin: Lài Yì

Leon Lai Yi (Chinese: 赖艺; born 29 November 1990) is a Chinese actor.

== Career ==
In 2015, Lai debuted with a role in the action fantasy television series Armor Hero. The same year, he made his big-screen debut in the crime thriller The Witness playing a rookie police officer.

In 2017, Lai became known to the audience after starring in hit xianxia romance drama Eternal Love as Die Feng. The same year, he played his first leading role in the youth romance web series Hi Flower.

In 2018, Lai starred in wuxia drama The Flame's Daughter, playing an antagonist. The same year, he starred in fantasy drama Legend of Fuyao. Lai's role as the mysterious and cold medicine practitioner Zong Yue received much popularity from the audience, and led to increased popularity for the actor.

In 2019, Lai starred in the esports drama The King's Avatar as Bao Rongxing. The same year, he was cast as the male lead in the historical romance drama Jiu Liu Overlord.

== Filmography ==
=== Film ===
Year	English title	Chinese title	Role	Notes
2015	The Witness	我是证人	Jing Kuang	
2016	Amor Hero Captor King	铠甲勇士捕王	Nangong Xinyi	

=== Television series ===
Year	English title	Chinese title	Role	Notes
2015	Amor Hero	铠甲勇士捕将	Nangong Xinyi	
2017	Eternal Love	三生三世十里桃花	Die Feng	
2017	Hi Flower	囧女翻身之嗨如花	Wen Chu	
2018	Negotiator	谈判官	Xie Xiaotian	
2018	The Flame's Daughter	烈火如歌	An Yeluo	
2018	Legend of Fuyao	扶摇	Zong Yue	
2019	The King's Avatar	全职高手	Bao Rongxing	
2020	Jiu Liu Overlord	九流霸主	Li Qingliu	
2021	Ancient Love Poetry	千古玦尘	Gu Jun	
2022	Who Rules The World	且试天下	Huang Chao	
2022	Simmer Down	好好说话	Luo Xiu	
2022	Love in Flames of War	良辰好景知几何	Mo Weiyi	
