= Boss & Me =

Chinese television series

- Also known as: Shan Shan Comes to Eat
- Genre: Romantic comedy
- Based on: Shan Shan Comes to Eat by Gu Man
- Directed by: Liu Junjie
- Starring: Hans Zhang; Zhao Liying
- Opening theme: "Wind's Promise" by Hans Zhang
- Ending theme: "Involuntary" by He Jie
- Country of origin: China
- Original language: Mandarin
- No. of episodes: 33

Production
- Executive producer: Wu Tao
- Producer: Su Jiangyu
- Production locations: Shanghai, China
- Running time: 45 minutes
- Production companies: Shanghai Croton Culture Media Co., Ltd.

Original release
- Network: Jiangsu TV, Dragon TV
- Release: 8 July – 22 July 2014

Related
- Love O2O

Boss & Me
- Simplified Chinese: 杉杉来了
Transcriptions
Standard Mandarin
- Hanyu Pinyin: Shan Shan Lai Le

Boss & Me (Chinese: 杉杉来了) is a 2014 Chinese television series starring Hans Zhang and Zhao Liying. It is based on the novel "Shan Shan Comes to Eat" written by Gu Man. The series aired on Jiangsu TV from 8 July to 20 July 2014.

The series was a commercial success in China, topping ratings charts and trending online with viral catchphrases. It is also popular in other countries like Russia and South Korea.

== Synopsis ==
Feng Teng (Hans Zhang) is a rich heir and the president of a giant conglomerate. He has a younger sister, Feng Yue, with a very rare blood type. Therefore, he recruits Shan Shan (Zhao Liying), who shares the same blood type as Feng Yue, into the company to be a blood donor. Interesting anecdotes occur when Feng Teng intentionally tries to fatten up Shan Shan, who loves eating. As Feng Teng gets to know Shan Shan, he discovers her innocence and kind heart beyond her clumsy nature, and falls in love with her.

When Feng Teng's childhood friend Yuan Lishu (Li Chengyuan) returns to the country, she is dismayed to discover that Feng Teng is in love with Shan Shan. She tries to compete with Shan Shan for Feng Teng's love. Together with Feng Teng's best friend, Zheng Qi (Huang Ming), the two try to separate the couple by inciting conflicts.

== Cast ==
=== Main ===
- Hans Zhang as Feng Teng
- Zhao Liying as Xue Shanshan
- Huang Ming as Zheng Qi
- Li Chengyuan as Yuan Lishu

=== Supporting ===
==== People around Feng Teng ====
- Zhang Yang Guo'er as Feng Yue, Feng Teng's sister
- Bai Keli as Yan Qing, Feng Yue's husband

==== People around Shan Shan ====
- Shi Anni as Xue Liuliu, Shan Shan's cousin
- Wang Ting as Lu Shuangyi, Shan Shan's best friend
- Cui Yongxuan as Du Fan, Shuangyi's boyfriend and Shan Shan's colleague
- Zhu Jian as Shan Shan's father
- Zhou Hong as Shan Shan's mother
- Lian Shuliang as Shan Shan's grandfather
- Qin Yue as Shan Shan's aunt and Liu Liu's mother
- Yao Chenghao as Xue Tongtong, Shan Shan's cousin and Liu Liu's brother

==== People in Feng Teng Company ====
- Li Fangding as Zhou Xiaowei
- Long Yiyi as Linda
- He Huan as Ah Mei
- Cao Shiping as Chief Lian
- Liu Yujin as Ah Jia
- Zhang Youyi as Xiao Xuan
- Jiang Dai as Xi Xi
- Han Yan as Qiao Qiao
- Suriya as Cheng Juan

==== Others ====
- Yang Kailin as Wang Pinruo, Feng Teng's ex-girlfriend
- Chai Haowei as You Chenghao, Liu Liu's boyfriend

== Soundtrack ==
No.	Title	Singer	Length
1.	"Wind's Promise (风之诺言)" (Opening theme song)	Hans Zhang
2.	"Involuntary (身不由己)" (Ending theme song)	He Jie
3.	"Roll the dice"	Gao Shan
4.	"By Chance"	Dish

== Ratings ==
Jiangsu TV Happiness Theater Premiere Ratings
Air date	Episode	CSM50 city ratings			CSM34 City ratings		
Air date	Episode	Ratings (%)	Audience share (%)	Rank	Ratings (%)	Rating share (%)	Rank
July 8, 2014	1-3	1.045	3.004	2	1.081	3.045	2
July 9, 2014	4-6	1.127	3.254	2	1.149	3.261	2
July 10, 2014	7-9	1.330	3.848	1	1.320	3.755	1
July 11, 2014	10-12	1.427	4.150	1	1.380	3.946	1
July 12, 2014	13-14	1.382	4.077	1	1.383	4.032	1
July 13, 2014	15-16	1.368	4.018	2	1.374	3.971	2
July 14, 2014	17-19	1.381	4.014	2	1.342	3.828	2
July 15, 2014	20-22	1.466	4.247	2	1.419	4.033	2
July 16, 2014	23-25	1.650	4.846	2	1.561	4.520	2
July 17, 2014	26-28	1.767	5.084	1	1.689	4.791	1
July 18, 2014	29-31	1.725	4.926	1	1.659	4.683	1
July 19, 2014	32-33	1.575	4.678	1	1.473	4.319	1
July 20, 2014	34	1.157	3.085	2	1.075	2.841	2
Average		1.44	4.183	/	1.402	4.008	/

- Highest ratings are marked in red, lowest ratings are marked in blue

== Awards and nominations ==
Year	Award	Category	Nominated work	Result	Ref.
2014	6th China TV Drama Awards	Most Popular Actress (Mainland China)	Zhao Liying	Won	
