= Qiu Guanghe =

Chinese businessman

- Born: 1951 (age 74–75); Wenzhou, China
- Occupations: Founder and CEO, Semir
- Spouse: married
- Children: 2

Qiu Guanghe (born 1951) is a Chinese entrepreneur, the founder and CEO of the retail clothing chain, Semir.

== Early life ==
Qiu Guanghe was born in 1951. He ended his education with high school.

== Career ==
Qiu Guanghe worked in the home-appliance industry, before founding clothes retailer Semir in Wenzhou, his hometown. Semir opened its first store in 1997 in Jiangsu Province, selling leisurewear. Semir is now one of China's largest clothing retailers, with more than 7,500 stores.

Qiu Guanghe shares his fortune with his family, including his son Qiu Jianqiang, who is vice chairman of the listed company, and son-in-law Zhou Pingfan, who is a senior executive at Semir. Semir owns Balabala, which is China's leading children's clothing brand.

== Personal life ==
He is married with two children and lives in Wenzhou, China.
