= The King's Avatar (2019 TV series) =

- Genre: Esports; Youth
- Based on: The King's Avatar by Hu Dielan
- Written by: Qiao Bingqing; Yu Yan; Zhou Sen; Bao Xiang; Zhao Zhonghao; Li Zhen
- Directed by: Shi Yiyue
- Starring: Yang Yang; Jiang Shuying
- Opening theme: "Light From The Ashes" by Cai Weize
- Ending theme: "Glory Battlefield" by R1SE
- Composer: Roc Chen
- Country of origin: China
- Original language: Mandarin
- No. of seasons: 1
- No. of episodes: 41

Production
- Executive producer: Teng Huatao
- Producers: Fang Fang; Yang Xiaopei
- Production locations: Shanghai; Hangzhou
- Running time: 45 mins
- Production companies: Tencent Penguin Pictures; Linmon Pictures; Phoenix Entertainment

Original release
- Network: Tencent Video
- Release: July 24, 2019

The King's Avatar (Chinese: 全职高手; pinyin: Quánzhí Gāoshǒu) is a 2019 Chinese live-action streaming television series based on the web novel of the same name by Hu Dielan. It stars Yang Yang as the main character. It premiered on Tencent Video on July 24, 2019.

== Synopsis ==
The series depicts a fictional esports scene in China where the story revolves around a multiplayer online video game called Glory. It chronicles the fall and rise of Ye Xiu, a top-tier player of Glory.

== Cast ==
=== Main ===
Actor	Character	ID	Role	Note
Yang Yang (young : Huang Yi)	Ye Xiu (叶修)	Lord Grim (君莫笑)	unspecialized	Former captain of Team Excellent Era. Current captain of Team Happy and the leader of the Chinese Glory Team. He is known as the 'Glory Textbook', as well as one of the Four Master Tacticians
Yang Yang (young : Huang Yi)	Ye Qiu (叶秋)	One Autumn Leaf (一叶之秋)	Battlemage	Wealthy, younger twin brother of Ye Xiu. When Ye Xiu registered to be a pro player, he used Ye Qiu's identification instead. He has no interest in video games.

=== Supporting ===
==== Team Happy (Xing Xin) ====
Actor	Character	ID	Role	Note
Jiang Shuying	Chen Guo (陈果)	Chasing Haze (逐烟霞)	Launcher	Owner of Happy Internet Cafe and Boss of Team Happy. She helped Ye Xiu rebuild his career and rise again.
Li Muchen	Tang Rou (唐柔)	Soft Mist (寒烟柔)	Battlemage	Friend of Chen Guo. Competitive person who learns to play Glory after visiting Chen Guo. One of the first members of Team Happy, led by Ye Xiu. She is known for her fast hand speed and aggressive attack style.
Lai Yi	Bao Rongxing (包荣兴)	Steamed Bun Invasion (包子入侵)	Brawler	A warehouse manager that Ye Xiu met online. A simple minded person, but unpredictable player.
Fan Jinwei	Qiao Yifan (乔一帆)	One Inch Ash (一寸灰)	Ghostblade	A former sub player from the Team Wei Cao. He is highly skilled, but lacks confidence.
Sun Ning	Luo Ji (罗辑)	Concealed Light (昧光)	Summoner	A student and mathematical genius known for his analytical skills and meticulousness, but lacks experience in gaming.
Yang Tingdong	Mo Fan (莫凡)	Deception (毁人不倦)	Ninja	A infamous scrap picker from the game. He is quiet and introverted, but is highly skilled and observant.
Bai Xiang (young : Cheng Jian)	Wei Chen (魏琛)	Windward Formation (迎风布阵)	Warlock	Former and the very first Captain of Team Blue Rain. An old player who wishes to recreate his former glory. Original owner of "Swoksaar"
Song Hanyu	Wu Chen (伍晨)	Dawn Rifle (晓枪)	Launcher	A former player of Team Everlasting and the best launcher of the team. After his team was eliminated by Team Xing Xin, he joined Xing Xin as their association president.
Li Junchen	An Wenyi (安文逸)	Little Cold Hands (小手冰凉)	Cleric	A former member of the 7th Branch Guild of Tyrannical Ambition, before being scooped away by Ye Xiu to join Team Xing Xin. He appears self-centered but always gives his all in crucial moments.

==== Team Excellent Era (Jia Shi) ====
Actor	Character	ID	Role	Note
Lai Yumeng (young : Han Mi)	Su Mucheng (苏沐橙)	Dancing Rain (沐雨橙风)	Launcher	A young lady who rose to be a professional Glory player through Ye Xiu's guidance. She is known as the best launcher player. She stays by Ye Xiu's side as his biggest supporter. She is the little sister of Su Muqiu, original user of Ye Xiu's Lord Grim best partner.
Liang Yimu	Sun Xiang (孙翔)	One Autumn Leaf (一片秋叶)	Battlemage	A former member of Team Conquering Clouds before he transfers to Team Jia Shi, and replaces Ye Xiu as captain of Team Jia Shi.
Zhao Chulun (young : Sun Hawen)	Tao Xuan (陶轩)		Battlemage	Manager of Team Jia Shi. He was a friend of Ye Xiu since the creation of the club but with time, their opinions clashed and he plotted to remove Ye Xiu.
Ling Jiyuan	Xiao Shiqin (肖时钦)	Life Extinguisher (生灵灭)	Mechanic	Former Captain of Team Thunderbolt who transferred to Team Jia Shi. He is one of Four Master Tacticians.
Zhai Zilu	Qiu Fei (邱非)	Combat Form (战斗格式)	Battlemage	Ye Xiu's loyal fan and disciple. He is loyal to Team Jia Shi and dedicates his effort to preserving and rebuilding the team.
Hao Shuai	Chen Yehui (陈夜辉)	Total Darkness (完全黑暗)	Spellblade	Guild leader of Jia Shi. He is a selfish player, who cares more about himself than others. He dislikes Ye Xiu to the point of always trying to find ways to sabotage him and his new team.
Chen Shuai	Li Rui (李睿)	Devils (鬥魔師)	Battlemage	A sub-team of the Team Jia Shi. He is an apprentice to Sun Xiang for match to Tang Rou in Glory All-Star.

==== Team Blue Rain (Lan Yu) ====
Actor	Character	ID	Role	Note
Gao Hanyu	Yu Wenzhou (喻文州)	Swoksaar (索克萨尔)	Warlock	Captain of Team Blue Rain. He is one of Four Master Tacticians. He has much lower hand speed compared to many of the other pro players.
Jiang Long	Huang Shaotian (黄少天)	Troubling Rain (夜雨声烦)	Blade Master	Vice captain of Team Blue Rain. The top Blade Master user in the pro circuit, and is known as the Sword Saint and core player of the team. He is famous for his rapid fire speech dialogue in combat to confuse his opponents.

==== Blue Brook Guild (Lan Xi) ====
Actor	Character	ID	Role	Note
Liu Qiushi	Xu Boyuan (许博远)	Blue River (蓝河)	Blade Master	Member of Blue Brook Guild. He is known as one of the Five Great Experts within the guild and Guild Leader on the 10th Server.
Jiang Xueming	Yan Xizhou (演系舟)	Bound Boat (系舟)	Cleric	Member of Blue Brook Guild. He is a friend and adviser to Xu Boyuan.

==== Team Tiny Herb (Wei Cao) ====
Actor	Character	ID	Role	Note
Gu Yufeng	Wang Jiexi (王杰希)	Vaccaria (王不留行)	Witch	Captain of Team Wei Cao. He is famous for a very erratic play style dubbed as the Magician.
Chen Hongzheng	Gao Yingjie (高英杰)	Kind Tree (木恩)	Witch	Main player of Team Wei Cao. He is a future successor of Vaccaria.
Ji Xiangyu	Zhou Yebai (周烨柏)	Rangoon Creeper (使君子)	Ghostblade	Sub player of Team Wei Cao.
Yu Zhe	Xiao Yun (肖云)	Euphorbia (大戟)	Battlemage	Sub player of Team Wei Cao.
Quan Peilun	Che Qianzi (车前子)	Plantango Seed (车前子)	Witch	Guild Leader of Wei Cao Garden on the 10th Server. He idolizes Wang Jiexi.

==== Team Tyranny (Ba Tu) ====
Actor	Character	ID	Role	Note
Gu Youming (young : Gao Erjin)	Han Wenqing (韩文清)	Desert Dust (大漠孤烟)	Striker	Captain of Team Tyranny. He is considered as Ye Qiu's true rival in the professional scene.
Qu Haojun	Zhang Xinjie (张新杰)	Immovable Rock (石不转)	Cleric	Vice captain of Team Tyranny. He is one of the Four Master Tacticians.
Kuang Muye	Leng Qishi (冷骑士)	Cold Night (夜度寒潭)	Knight	Guild Leader of Tyrannical Ambitions on the 10th Server.

=== Others ===
Actor	Character	ID	Role	Note
Yin Yi	Su Muqiu (苏沐秋)	Autumn Tree (秋木苏)	Sharpshooter	Ye Xiu's best friend and Su Mucheng's brother.
Li Xiaopang	Chang Xian (常先)	Sleeping Moon (沉睡的月亮)	Blade Master	He is a magazine reporter and one of Ye Qiu's biggest fans.
Lu Senbao				Chen Guo's father.
Gao Jinghan	Li Xuan (李軒)	Crying Devil (哭泣的恶魔)	Ghostblade	Captain of Void club team. He is best known as master of Choppin Tricks. First time in league match to Qiao Yifan on Glory All-Star.

== Production ==
The live-action series was first announced in February 2017 via a production conference held by Linmon Pictures; and would be co-produced with Tencent Penguin Pictures. The author of the novel Hu Dielan was invited to be the overall planner of the series.

On June 13, 2017, Yang Yang was announced as the lead actor in a press conference. In November, Song Zu'er was announced as the female lead Su Mucheng, but backed out in March 2018 due to scheduling conflicts.

The series began filming in April 2018, and wrapped up in September 2018. A Dungeon Fighter Online professional player was engaged to serve as instructor to the cast. The production embraces a number of technological advances, e.g. motion capture, face capture, and their integration with virtual shooting using Unreal engine for real-time preview. The voice actors of the donghua were invited to dub the actors in the television series.

== Reception ==
The series was an instant hit among young audiences due to its fresh storyline centered around esports, as well as the quality of the visual effects. It won praise from People's Daily as well as several industry professionals for its spiritual focus and creative value. It attracted more than 3 billion views on Tencent Video, and more than ten million views on overseas market platforms such as WeTV and YouTube.

== Soundtrack ==
No.	Title	Lyrics	Music	Singers	Length
1.	"Light From The Ashes (來自塵埃的光)" (Opening theme song)	Qing Xiu	Roc Chen	Cai Weize
2.	"Standing on the Peak (巅峰之上)"	Qing Xiu	Roc Chen	Mao Buyi
3.	"The Best of You (最了不起的你)"	Jie Liang	Roc Chen	Duan Aojuan
4.	"Glory Battlefield (荣耀战场)" (Ending theme song)	Jie Liang	Roc Chen	R1SE

== Awards and nominations ==
Award	Category	Nominated work	Result	Ref.
15th Chinese American Film Festival	Best Web Series	The King's Avatar	Won	
15th Chinese American Film Festival	Best Producer	Yang Xiaopei	Won	
15th Chinese American Film Festival	Best Actress (Web series)	Jiang Shuying	Won	
3rd Yinchuan Internet Film Festival	Best Actress (Web series)	Jiang Shuying	Won	
7th The Actors of China Award Ceremony	Best Actress (Web series)	Jiang Shuying	Nominated	
7th The Actors of China Award Ceremony	Best Actor (Web series)	Yang Yang	Nominated	
China Entertainment Industry Summit (Golden Pufferfish Awards)	Best Drama	The King's Avatar	Won	
20th China Video Awards	Hot Drama of the Year	The King's Avatar	Won	
Golden Bud - The Fourth Network Film And Television Festival	Best Web Series	The King's Avatar	Nominated	
Golden Bud - The Fourth Network Film And Television Festival	Top Ten Web Series	The King's Avatar	Won	
Golden Bud - The Fourth Network Film And Television Festival	Best Actor	Yang Yang	Nominated	
Golden Bud - The Fourth Network Film And Television Festival	Best Actress	Jiang Shuying	Nominated	
Baidu Fudian Awards	Top Ten Television Series	The King's Avatar	Won	
Tencent Video All Star Awards	Producer of the Year	Yang Xiaopei	Won	
Tencent Video All Star Awards	TV Actor of the Year	Yang Yang	Won	
Tencent Video All Star Awards	Quality Actor of the Year	Jiang Shuying	Won	
Tencent Video All Star Awards	Most Promising Actor	Zhai Zilu	Won	
