= Love O2O (film) =

- Poster
- Chinese: 微微一笑很倾城
- Directed by: Zhao Tianyu
- Written by: Gu Man
- Screenplay by: Gu Man; Yu Pan; Feixian Shen
- Based on: Just One Smile Is Very Alluring by Gu Man
- Produced by: Zhang Yibai
- Starring: Jing Boran; Angelababy
- Cinematography: Bingqiang Li
- Edited by: Chi-Leung Kwong
- Music by: Nathan Wang
- Production companies: Shanghai GCod Entertainment; Huace Pictures (Tianjing); Tianjin Lianrui Pictures; Dongyang Yixing Media; Shanghai Tencent Pictures; Taiyang Chuanghe Media
- Distributed by: Huace Pictures (Tianjing); Tianjin Lianrui Pictures; Shanghai Tencent Pictures
- Release date: 12 August 2016
- Running time: 105 minutes
- Country: China
- Language: Mandarin
- Box office: CN¥275.5 million (China) US$39.97 million (worldwide)

Love O2O is a 2016 Chinese romance film directed by Zhao Tianyu and starring Angelababy and Jing Boran. It is based on the novel of the same name by Gu Man. It was released in China on 12 August 2016.

== Plot ==
Xiao Nai is a gamer, who is also a popular student on campus. One day, he comes across the campus goddess Bei Wei Wei and it was love at first sight. However, it was not Wei Wei's looks that he noticed, but her skill at the online role-playing game that they both play. Xiao Nai must use his skills both in real life and online to capture Wei Wei's heart. But does their love have the experience points to succeed, or will this relationship never level up to the next stage?

== Cast ==
- Jing Boran as Xiao Nai
- Angelababy as Bei Weiwei
- Ryan Zhang as Zhen Shao Xiang
- Tan Songyun as Zhao Er Xi/ Leishen Nini
- Zheng Ye Cheng as Hao Mei / Mo Zha Ta
- Li Xian as Yu Ban Shan
- Johnny Bai as Cao Guang / Zhenshui Wuxiang
- Guan Xin as Xiao Yu Yao
- Xunzimo Liu as KO
- Cui Kyle as Qiu Yong Hou
- Hu Hao Bo as Ah Shuang
- Guo Xu Wei as Ah Li
- Janice Wu as Xiao Ling
- Liu Gu Hao as Wang Zong
- Li Xin Ze as Ah Cai
- Song Yi Xing as Tian Si Si
- Zhang Hao Yu as The world is righteous / male pet
- Lu Yan Qi as Lei Shen Ni Ni
- Li Qin as Meng Yi Ran
- Liu Yu Jin as Die Meng Wei Xing
- Bian Cheng as Xiao Yang
- Fu Jun as Wei Wei's Father
- Cai Gang as Xiao Nai's Father
- Kelly Gu as Xiao Nai's Mother
- Adela Long as Xiao Wang
- Marco Leng as Li Zong
- Chen Jie as Love Channel
- Yang Xue Ying as Xiao Yu Qing Qing / Yu Yao's friend
- Liu Xian Yi as Xiao Yu Mian Mian
- Song Yu Qing as Xiao Yu Fei Fei / Xiao Yu Clan
- Zhang Tao as Zhan Tian Xia
- Zhou Zoe as Nana
- Wang Sicong as himself

== Reception ==
The film grossed US$18.2 million on its opening weekend in China. It grossed a total of CN¥275.5 million at the Chinese box office, and US$39,969,537 worldwide.

== See also ==
- Love O2O (TV series)
