= Once Upon a Time (2017 Chinese film) =

- Official poster
- Chinese: 三生三世十里桃花
- Hanyu Pinyin: Sān Shēng Sān Shì Shí Lǐ Táo Huā
- Directed by: Zhao Xiaoding; Anthony LaMolinara
- Written by: TangQi Gongzi
- Based on: Three Lives Three Worlds, Ten Miles Peach Blossoms by TangQi Gongzi
- Produced by: Sa Zhilei; Zhang Yibai
- Starring: Liu Yifei; Yang Yang
- Cinematography: Zhao Xiaoding
- Edited by: Derek Hui
- Production companies: Alibaba Pictures Group; Beijing Zhonglian Huameng Media Investment; Beijing Ruyi Xinxin Film Investment
- Release date: 3 August 2017
- Running time: 108 minutes
- Country: China
- Language: Mandarin
- Budget: CN¥150 million
- Box office: US$82.3 million (China); US$83.3 million (worldwide)

Once Upon a Time (Chinese: 三生三世十里桃花) is a Chinese romantic drama fantasy film produced by Alibaba Pictures and directed by Zhao Xiaoding and Anthony LaMolinara. It is based on the fantasy novel Three Lives Three Worlds, Ten Miles Peach Blossoms, also known as To the Sky Kingdom, by TangQi Gongzi. The film stars Liu Yifei and Yang Yang. Originally slated to be released in China on 21 July 2017, the film's release date was later pushed back to 3 August 2017.

== Plot ==
70,000 years ago, fox goddess Bai Qian was a disciple of Mo Yuan, the God of War. Using the name Si Yin, Bai Qian fell in love with her master. During a battle with the Demon Tribe's King, Mo Yuan sacrificed himself in order to seal away the Demon King. His soul was scattered and his body became preserved in a block of ice. Bai Qian took Mo Yuan's body back to Qing Qiu, a mystical land where her family lives, where she awaited his eventual awakening and return.

One day, Bai Qian attends a banquet where she saves a boy named Ah Li from getting kidnapped. She also meets his father, the Crown Prince of the Heaven Tribe and her betrothed. Upon seeing Bai Qian, he calls her by the name of a mortal woman he had fallen in love with 300 years prior and Ah Li's mother, Su Su. Shortly after, Ye Hua and Ah Li arrive in Qing Qiu in an attempt to bond with her. During his stay, he comes to the conclusion that Bai Qian was Su Su, and is saddened yet relieved that she does not remember their painful past. Realizing that they have developed a mutual liking for each other, Ye Hua and Bai Qian decide to wed. Bai Qian eventually learns from Ye Hua's side concubine, Su Jin, that Su Su had committed suicide and comes to believe that Ye Hua is only marrying her because he feels guilty.

Due to an artifact given to her by Ye Hua, Bai Qian's memories as Su Su are regained. 300 years ago, Bai Qian was forced to undergo a heavenly trial. With her powers and memories locked away, she started a new life as Su Su and subsequently met Ye Hua. He snuck Su Su into the Heaven Tribe where he abandoned her and left Su Su to work as a maid. After being falsely accused of a crime by Su Jin, Ye Hua gouged out Su Su's eyes as retribution. Su Su came to believe that Ye Hua no longer loved her and later committed suicide shortly after giving birth to Ah Li. Because she is immortal, Bai Qian's body returned to Qing Qiu where she drank a healing water to forget her life as Su Su. In reality, Ye Hua had broken the laws of Heaven by falling in love with a mortal. In order to protect her from the consequences of his actions, Ye Hua disguised Su Su as a maid and left her alone in the palace to keep up the charade. Su Jin discovered Su Su was actually Ye Hua's human lover and framed her for a crime. Ye Hua was forced to blind Su Su and endured her original punishment which was to be struck by lightning.

Still heartbroken about her memories as Su Su, Bai Qian refuses to see Ye Hua who waits in Qing Qiu for days. Hearing that Qing Cang has broken free, Ye Hua takes it upon himself to defeat the Demon King. Bai Qian learns of his plans and witnesses Ye Hua sacrificing himself to lock up Qing Cang. Ye Hua's body drifts into a freezing river and floats away under the ice as Bai Qian watches in tears. Ye Hua's sacrifice allows Mo Yuan to awaken, as Ye Hua was the final piece of Mo Yuan's scattered soul. Mo Yuan and Bai Qian are happily reunited.

== Cast ==
- Liu Yifei as Bai Qian / Si Yin / Su Su
- Yang Yang as Ye Hua / Mo Yuan
- Luo Jin as Zhe Yan
- Yan Yikuan as Qing Cang
- Li Chun as Su Jin
- Gu Xuan as Xuan Nu
- Peng Zisu as Ah Li (Bai Chen)
- Chen Xingxu as Li Yiguan

== Production ==
On 16 June 2015, it was announced that Liu Yifei will play the leading role of Bai Qian / Si Yin / Su Su. The role of Ye Hua, the male lead, was announced to be portrayed by Yang Yang on 29 October.

Principal photography started on 18 December 2015, and wrapped on 21 March 2016. The dress design of the film was Lawrence Xu.

== Soundtrack ==
No.	Title	Lyrics	Music	Singer	Length
1.	"Three Lifetimes, Ten Miles of Peach Blossoms (三生三世十里桃花)"	Ding Ding Zhang	Chan Kwong-wing	Na Ying	04:43
2.	"Ten Miles of Peach Blossoms (十里桃花)"	Fang Wen-shan	Zhang Liang-ying	Jane Zhang	03:21
3.	"Three Lifetimes, Ten Miles of Peach Blossoms (三生三世十里桃花)"	Ding Ding Zhang	Chan Kwong-wing	Liu Yifei, Yang Yang	04:13
4.	"Peach Blossom Rain (桃花雨)"	Xu Rongkai	Lao Zai	Henry Huo	04:21

== Release ==
The film is scheduled for release in China (3 August), Vietnam (4 August), Cambodia (4 August), North America (11 August), Myanmar (11 August), Malaysia (17 August), UK (18 August), Singapore (24 August), Australia (31 August), Germany, Thailand, South Korea (in September) and Japan.

=== Box office ===
The film's opening day gross was CN¥175 million. It grossed a total of US$82.3 million in China.

Variety reported that Once Upon a Time would open in North American screens on 11 August 2017, distributed by Well Go USA. It grossed US$485,728 on its opening weekend in North America.

Wanda Vietnam reported that Once Upon a Time had earned VND10 billion (US$440,000) 9 days after release, which is considered very impressive in Vietnam.

As of September 2017 it had collected US$13,732 in UK, and was reported to have collected US$54,932 in Australia.

== Awards and nominations ==
Year	Award	Category	Recipient	Result	Ref.
2017	China Film Week in Tokyo & Okinawa - 2nd Golden Crane Award	Best Actress	Liu Yifei	Won	
2017	China Film Week in Tokyo & Okinawa - 2nd Golden Crane Award	Best Actor	Yang Yang	Nominated	
2017	9th Macau International Movie Festival	Best Director	Zhao Xiaoding	Nominated	
2017	9th Macau International Movie Festival	Best Actress	Liu Yifei	Nominated	
2017	9th Macau International Movie Festival	Best New Director	Zhao Xiaoding	Won	

== See also ==
- Eternal Love
