= My Sunshine =

2015 Chinese TV series

- Promotional poster
- Genre: Romance; Melodrama
- Based on: Silent Separation by Gu Man
- Written by: Gu Man; Mo Bao Fei Bao
- Directed by: Liu Junjie
- Starring: Wallace Chung; Tiffany Tang
- Opening theme: My Sunshine by Jason Zhang
- Ending theme: What Is Love by Wallace Chung
- Country of origin: China
- Original language: Mandarin
- No. of episodes: TV: 32, iQiyi: 36

Production
- Executive producer: Xia Jie
- Producers: Zhang Yan, Xiong Xiaoling
- Production locations: Shanghai, Suzhou, Shenzhen, Hong Kong
- Running time: 45 minutes
- Production company: Croton Media

Original release
- Network: Dragon TV, Jiangsu TV, iQiyi
- Release: 10 January – 25 January 2015

Related
- You Are My Sunshine

My Sunshine (Chinese: 何以笙箫默; Chinese: 何以笙簫默) is a 2015 Chinese television series based on the novel Silent Separation written by Gu Man. It stars Wallace Chung and Tiffany Tang. The series premiered simultaneously on Dragon TV, Jiangsu TV, and iQiyi on 10 January 2015.

My Sunshine is a huge success in China with over 10 billion views online.

== Synopsis ==
In their university days, Zhao Mosheng fell in love at first sight with law student He Yichen. Through various incidents where Mosheng stalked Yichen on campus, Mosheng's cheerful personality charmed Yichen, and they slowly became college sweethearts. When Yichen's foster sister, Yimei challenged Mosheng for Yichen's attention, Mosheng turned directly to Yichen for clarification, but did not expect to receive a cold response from him. Mistaking that Yichen and Yimei are a couple, Mosheng followed her father's arrangements and moved to the United States to continue her studies. Seven years later, Mosheng, who is now a professional photographer, returns to China, and coincidentally bumps into Yichen who has never forgotten her after all these years. Since the seven years they broke up, many people stand in the way of these star-crossed lovers: foster-sister Yimei; Mosheng's marriage in United States; the unrelentingly infatuated ex-husband Ying Hui; as well as the financial grudges between the couple's fathers. All these situations continue to affect the two former lovers, but instead, these misunderstandings and challenges give them a better comprehension of the love they have missed over the past seven years.

== Cast ==
=== Main ===
- Wallace Chung as He Yichen
  - Luo Yunxi as young He Yichen
- Tiffany Tang as Zhao Mosheng
  - Janice Wu as young Zhao Mosheng
- Jian Renzi as He Yimei
- Tan Kai as Ying Hui
- Mi Lu as Xiao Xiao
- Yang Le as Lu Yuanfeng

=== Supporting ===
==== Law Office ====
- Zhao Chu Lun as Xiang Heng
- Hou Rui Xiang as young Xiang Heng
- Lin Peng as Yuan Fei
- Huang Shi Chao as Lawyer Liu
- Liu Yu Jin as Mei Ting

==== Treasure Magazine ====
- Zang Hong Na as Gu Xinghong
- Rong Rong as Editor Zhang
- Song Zi Qiao as Wen Min
- Zhang Nai Ou as Tao Yijing
- He Guo Xuan as Da Bao

==== Others ====
- Wu Ren Yuan as Zhao Qingyuan
- Qin Yue as Pei Fangmei
- Duanmu Chong Hui as Linda
- Wu Yan Su as Xu Ying
- Chen Xin Yu as young Xu Ying
- Wang Xiao Ying as Juan Jie
- Gao Ting Ting as Mi Feier
- Long Yi Yi as Tong Xinying
- Li Chen as Hairstylist

== Production ==
Wallace Chung and Tiffany Tang were cast in the respective lead roles of He Yichen and Zhao Mosheng six months after the show's initial production announcement at the end of 2013. Filming started on June 20, 2014 in Shanghai, and ended September 14, 2014 at Hong Kong's Victoria Harbour.

The younger versions of Mosheng and Yichen were supposed to be acted by two unknown newcomers, but after behind-the-scenes photos were leaked, netizens criticized the actors' appearances, "During the seven years, does this mean they went to South Korea for plastic surgery?" Both Tiffany Tang and Wallace Chung expressed their desire to film their own university-era character versions, so the original footage was scrapped, and university-era scenes were filmed in September 2014.

== Soundtrack ==
No.	Title	Singer	Length
1.	"My Sunshine" (Opening Theme Song)	Jason Zhang	4:26
2.	"What Is Love (何以愛情)" (Ending Theme Song)	Wallace Chung	4:51
3.	"Long Time No See (好久不見)"	Tiffany Tang	4:45
4.	"A Ray of Light (微光)"	Hua Chenyu	4:26
5.	"The Road Not Taken"	Gao Shan	3:21
6.	"When I Met You, All The Stars Fell On My Head (遇見你的時候所有星星都落到我頭上)"	Gao Shan	3:48

== Ratings ==
Air date	Episode	Jiangsu TV			Dragon TV		
Air date	Episode	Ratings (%)	Audience share (%)	Rank	Ratings (%)	Audience share (%)	Rank
2015-01-10	1-2	0.792	2.05	4	0.563	1.46	8
2015-01-11	3-4	0.988	2.53	4	0.577	1.48	5
2015-01-12	5-6	0.800	2.08	4	0.591	1.54	5
2015-01-13	7-8	0.892	2.31	4	0.666	1.73	5
2015-01-14	9-10	0.937	2.39	4	0.664	1.70	6
2015-01-15	11-12	0.982	2.56	5	0.751	1.96	6
2015-01-16	13-14	1.026	2.63	5	0.905	2.32	6
2015-01-17	15-16	1.343	3.45	2	0.995	2.55	5
2015-01-18	17-18	1.482	3.79	2	1.204	3.08	4
2015-01-19	19-20	1.471	3.82	2	1.160	3.02	4
2015-01-20	21-22	1.373	3.58	2	1.195	3.12	4
2015-01-21	23-24	1.495	3.90	2	1.224	3.20	4
2015-01-22	25-26	1.522	3.81	2	1.238	3.10	4
2015-01-23	27-28	1.391	3.58	2	1.195	3.09	4
2015-01-24	29-30	1.618	4.18	2	1.162	3.00	4
2015-01-25	31-32	1.631	4.08	2	1.202	3.01	4
Average		1.234	3.16	/	0.956	2.45	/

- Highest ratings are marked in red, lowest ratings are marked in blue

== Awards and nominations ==
Year	Awards	Category	Nominee	Results
2015	17th Huading Awards	Best Actor	Wallace Chung	Nominated
2015	17th Huading Awards	Best Actress	Tiffany Tang	Nominated
2015	17th Huading Awards	Best Actress (Contemporary)	Tiffany Tang	Won
2015	10th Seoul International Drama Award	Asian Star Grand Prize Award	Wallace Chung	Won
2016	1st China Television Drama Quality Ceremony	Quality Award		Won
2016	1st China Television Drama Quality Ceremony	Audience's Favorite TV Series (Dragon TV)		Won
2017	11th National Top-Notch Television Production Award Ceremony	Outstanding Television Series		Won

== International broadcast ==
- Malaysia - 8TV (Malaysia)
- Thailand - Amarin TV
- Indonesia – MyTV - 1 February 2019
