= You Are My Sunshine (2015 film) =

- Chinese: 何以笙箫默
- Directed by: Yang Wenjun; Huang Bin
- Based on: Silent Separation by Gu Man
- Starring: Huang Xiaoming; Yang Mi; Tong Dawei; Angelababy
- Production company: Le Vision Pictures
- Release date: April 30, 2015
- Running time: 107 minutes
- Country: China
- Language: Mandarin
- Box office: US$56.6 million

You Are My Sunshine (Chinese: 何以笙箫默), also known as Silent Separation, is a 2015 Chinese romantic drama film starring Huang Xiaoming, Yang Mi, Tong Dawei, and Angelababy. It was released on 30 April 2015. The movie is based on the novel Silent Separation written by Gu Man. A 2015 Chinese television series, My Sunshine, is based on the same novel.

== Plot ==
In their university days, Zhao Mosheng fell in love at first sight with law student He Yichen. Through various incidents where Mosheng "stalked" Yichen on campus, Mosheng's cheerful personality charmed Yichen, and they slowly became college sweethearts. When Yichen's foster sister Yimei challenged Mosheng for Yichen's attention, Mosheng turned directly to Yichen for clarification, but did not expect to receive a cold response from him. Mistaking that Yichen and Yimei are a couple, Mosheng followed her father's arrangements and moved to the United States to continue her studies. Seven years later, Mosheng - who is now a professional photographer - returns to China, and coincidentally bumps into the unforgettable Yichen. Since the seven years they broke up, many people stand in the way of these star-crossed lovers: foster-sister Yimei; Mosheng's marriage in United States; the unrelentingly infatuated ex-husband Ying Hui; as well as the financial grudges between the couple's fathers. All these situations continue to affect the two former lovers, but instead, these misunderstandings and challenges give them a better comprehension of the love they have missed over the past seven years.

== Cast ==
- Huang Xiaoming as He Yichen
- Yang Mi as Zhao Mosheng
- Tong Dawei as Ying Hui
- Angelababy as He Yimei
- Evonne Hsieh as Hua Xianzi
- Huang Zitao as William
- Joan Chen as Pei Fangmei
- Sui He as Xiao Xiao
- Ma Su as Ms. Wen
- Hua Shao as Teacher Zhou
- Eric Tsang as Mr. Lin
- Yao Anlian as Zhao Qing Yuan
- Sun Yizhou as Supermarket Manager
- Kong Lianshun as Supermarket Security officer
- Shen Tai as Xiang Heng
- Liu Tianzuo as Mr. Yuan (Lao Yuan)

== Reception ==
=== Box office ===
The film opened in China on 30 April 2015 and earned $37.68 million from 180,513 screenings and 6.7 million admissions in its opening weekend, debuting at number two at the Chinese box office behind Furious 7.

=== Critical response ===
The film was criticized for its lack of cinematic technique, artistic and chemistry between its leads. On Variety, Maggie Lee said the film "feels like a puzzle with half the pieces missing."
