= You Are My Glory =

2021 Chinese television series

- Promotional poster
- Genre: Romantic drama
- Based on: You Are My Glory by Gu Man
- Written by: Gu Man
- Directed by: Wang Zhi
- Starring: Yang Yang; Dilraba Dilmurat
- Opening theme: "Fireworks of Stars" (烟火星辰) by Liu Yuning
- Ending theme: "Time Monologue" (光阴独白) by Lala Hsu
- Country of origin: China
- Original language: Mandarin
- No. of seasons: 1
- No. of episodes: 32

Production
- Producers: Fang Fang; Zhang Wei Lin; Zhang Meng; Liu Jia
- Camera setup: Multi-camera
- Production company: Tencent Penguin Pictures

Original release
- Network: Tencent Video, WeTV
- Release: July 26 – August 30, 2021

You Are My Glory (Chinese: 你是我的荣耀) is a 2021 Chinese television series starring Yang Yang and Dilraba Dilmurat. Based on the novel of the same name written by Gu Man, it mainly tells the story of the popular actress Qiao Jingjing and her former high school classmate Yu Tu as they unexpectedly reunite to play the mobile game Honor of Kings. It premiered on Tencent Video and WeTV on July 26, 2021 and ran until August 30, 2021.

As of 20 August 2021, the series has reached 4 billion views.

== Story ==
Yu Tu and Qiao Jing-Jing were classmates in high school. Jing-Jing had a crush on Yu Tu, but he rejected her. The two would part ways to develop their careers. Yu Tu dreamed of the stars and became an aerospace engineer while Jing-Jing became a famous model and actress. Even though they lived separate lives, Jing-Jing never forgot about Yu Tu. As part of her celebrity image, Jing-Jing has presented herself as a great player on the mobile game Honor of Kings. When the authenticity of her skills came into question, she needed to prove her abilities to her critics. It was while playing the game that she reconnected with Yu Tu. Still having feelings for him, she convinced him to meet and help train her to prepare for an upcoming game tournament. As the two started working together, Yu Tu started to have feelings for Jing-Jing. Upon the tournament, Jing-Jing proved the legitimacy of her gaming skills and also took the chance to introduce her fans to Yu Tu. While it was quickly suspected they're together, both denied any relationship but praised each other for their gaming skills. After the two won their match, Jing-Jing couldn't hold her feelings back anymore and confessed her feelings for Yu Tu. Unfortunately, Yu Tu didn't feel worthy of her and rejected her again. However, Yu Tu would realized he was making excuses for himself and regret his decision. It was during Chinese New Year, when both returned to their hometown, Yu Tu had the chance to explain himself and apologized for hurting Jing-Jing's feelings; they haven't become a couple yet as Jing-Jing has become hesitant to reciprocate Yu Tu's feelings. During a class reunion, Jing-Jing made a rare appearance to the gathering in hopes to see Yu Tu. When Yu Tu found out about Jing-Jing's appearance, he quickly rushed over there to see her. It was while there in front of all their ex-classmates that Yu Tu kissed Jing-Jing and solidified their relationship. Afterwards, they did their best to keep a low profile on their relationship. Eventually though, both of them would get involved in each other's worlds. Yu Tu's family and associates were shocked as he's dating a celebrity while giving everyone the impression he's a lone wolf. Jing-Jing's side were shocked that she would date such a handsome and intelligent engineer. Eventually, the two would move in together and talked about marriage. Yu Tu originally felt pressured to give her a grand wedding, but the two settled for a group marriage. The internet exploded with support for the two and the couple continue to have a loving relationship. The story would fast forward several years into their marriage, showing Yu Tu successfully launching the most recent Chinese rocket into space and his continued appreciation for Jing-Jing.

== Cast ==
=== Main ===
- Yang Yang as Yu Tu

Graduated from the top 1 university with a major in finance and Aerospace Science, and has been the unattainable god of learning since he was a child. Influenced by his family, he is very obsessed with aerospace. He falls in love with his high school classmate, Qiao Jingjing.

- Dilraba Dilmurat as Qiao Jingjing

Popular actress. When she was a student, she had a crush on Yu Tu, and ten years later, she became a popular first-tier actress. The game she endorsed was a big hit, but her image as a game master was called into question. In order to regain her image as an endorser, she started to find a teacher to teach her, and by chance, she met Yu Tu again in the game. When Yu Tu hesitates to quit his job as an aerospace designer and switch to the financial industry so that his family can live a stable life, she keeps encouraging him to bravely pursue his dream.

=== Supporting ===
==== Yu Tu's family ====
- Cao Yi as Yu Tu's father
- Cui Yi as Yu Tu's mother
- Wang Rui as Xiao Liu, Yu Tu's cousin

==== Qiao Jingjing's family ====
- Wang Quanyou as Qiao Jingjing's father
- Yan Qingyu as Qiao Jingjing's mother
- Zheng Xiaomao as Qiao Jingjing's grandfather
- Zhu Huaixu as Qiao Jingjing's grandmother
- Liu Lei as Qiao Jingjing's cousin
- Li Yaze as Qiao Jingjing's brother
- Zhou Yunru as Qiao Jingjing's sister

==== China Aerospace Science and Technology Corporation ====
- Pan Yueming as Guan Zai

Chief designer of the Institute of Aerospace Research. Yu Tu's boss and best friend. He gave up his high-paying job to work with Yu Tu to design the same type of rocket. As Yu Tu's predecessor, he helps Yu Tu a lot in his work and life. When Yu Tu decides to give up his space career, Guan also believes that he will not give up.

- Zheng Xiaoning as Director Hu, Yu Tu's senior
- Wang Shihuai as Director Zhang, Yu Tu's mentor
- An Ge as Meng Anyu, Yu Tu's colleague
- Zheng Qi as Zhou Gong, Yu Tu's colleague
- Zhao Kedi as Hu Kehang, Yu Tu's colleague
- Lu Zhong as Chief Designer
- Yan Zhiping as CEO Li's designer
- Sun Wei as Telemetry and Remote Control System Designer
- Zhao Xiaoguang as Telemetry and Remote Control System Designer
- Ge Jiwei as Telemetry and Remote Control System Designer
- Lu Tu as Mobile Designer
- Han Bo as Mobile Designer
- Xu Fan as GNC Designer

==== Qiao Jingjing's studio ====
- Hu Ke as Sister Ling

Qiao Jingjing's manager. She has a gentle and easy-going personality and is very affectionate. She has always wanted Jingjing to fall in love and Qiao Jingjing is like a daughter to her. She is both a teacher and a friend to Qiao Jingjing.

- Sun Yali as Xiao Zhu, Qiao Jingjing's assistant
- Liu Luoxi as Dan Dan, Qiao Jingjing's PR
- Luo Lei as Qiao Jingjing's driver

==== Entertainment Industry ====
- Janice Wu as Chen Xue, Qiao Jingjing's good friend
- Zhao Yingzi as Zhou Ziqi, Qiao Jingjing's rival
- Yuan Chengjie as Duan Wu, Qiao Jingjing's partner
- Wang Dong as Movie King Zhou
- Lu Yong as Director Li

==== People around Yu Tu ====
- Gina Jin as Xia Qing, Yu Tu's ex-girlfriend
- Wang Yanlin as Zhai Liang, Yu Tu's good friend

==== People around Qiao Jingjing ====
- Zheng Hehuizi as Pei Pei, Qiao Jingjing's best friend
- Ji Xiaobing as Su Zhi, Qiao Jingjing's ex-boyfriend
- Tu Songyan as A Guo, Sister Ling's husband & Qiao Jingjing's first game coach

==== King of Glory ====
- Peng Bo as Alex, King of Glory executive
- Liu Jiayi as Zhou Yin, King of Glory professional player. Qiao Jingjing's fan
- Lu Yunfeng as Xia Xue, King of Glory professional player
- Yang Jinheng as He Liu, King of Glory professional player
- Wang Yujie (王钰杰) as Qi Zhu, King of Glory professional player
- Huang Chengcheng as Sha Bao, King of Glory player
- Zhou Shuai as Long Wang, King of Glory player

==== Others ====
- Li Hui'er (李绘儿) as Hui Hui, Sister Ling and A Guo's daughter
- Chen Guanning as Ren Wang, an investment executive who admires Yu Tu
- Yao Yiqi as A Dou, reporter
- Liu Yunlong as Xiao Lan, reporter
- Liu Chao as Da Mao, reporter
- Liu Lili as Professor Wang, Director Zhang's wife
- Teng Aixian as Director Hu's wife
- Guo Tongtong as Xia Qing's roommate
- Gao Lu as Shen Jing, Guan Zai's wife
- Sun Le as Guan Zhu, Guan Zai's brother
- Zhang Yuxuan as Guan Meng, Guan Zai and Shen Jing's son
- Li Ruoning as Li Ruo
- Wang Zheng as Qu Ming
- Ning Xiaozhi as Professor Xiao
- Liu Weilong as Manager Zhang

==== Extended ====
- Ni Yan as Short Hair Girl
- Chen Heyi as Spectacled Guy
- Zhang Yiwen as Middle Aged Guy
- Yang Xuchen as White Collared Girl
- Ye Xiaokai as Game Streamer
- Hong Wei as CEO of Huo Jian
- Yang Chen as Popular Artist Commentator
- Wang Yilin as Classmate
- Liu Zhehui as Classmate
- Yan Jingyao as CEO Fang
- Zhu Weiwei as Professor Zhao

== Promotional activities ==
On August 2, 2020, Dilraba Dilmurat attended Tencent's annual video conference and announced that she would be starring with Yang Yang in the drama "You Are My Glory". Due to the schedule, Yang Yang could not attend the conference, but informed the media through VCR and the first poster was distributed to the media directly.

On September 29, 2020, the film crew officially launched in Shanghai and held the premiere ceremony at Fudan University. At 12:00, Weibo officially released the images of the shooting ceremony and the cast, at 13:00, Weibo crew posted the first image of the male and female leads.

== See also ==
- Falling Into Your Smile, another 2021 streaming television series based on e-sports/competitive gaming
- List of Tencent Video original programming
