= Love O2O (TV series) =

2016 Chinese television series

- Promotional poster
- Also known as: A Smile is Beautiful; One Smile is Very Alluring
- Genre: Romance comedy
- Based on: A Smile is Beautiful by Gu Man
- Written by: Gu Man; Shen Feixuan; Wen Ting; Ou Yang
- Directed by: Lin Yufen
- Starring: Yang Yang; Zheng Shuang
- Country of origin: China
- Original language: Mandarin
- No. of episodes: 30

Production
- Production location: China
- Running time: 45 minutes
- Production company: Gcoo Entertainment

Original release
- Network: Jiangsu Television, Dragon Television, Youku, Tudou
- Release: 22 August – 6 September 2016

Related
- Boss & Me (2014)

Love O2O
- Simplified Chinese: 微微一笑很倾城
Transcriptions
Standard Mandarin
- Hanyu Pinyin: Wēi Wēi Yī Xiào Hěn Qīng Chéng

Love O2O (Chinese: 微微一笑很倾城; pinyin: Wēi Wēi Yī Xiào Hěn Qīng Chéng) is a 2016 Chinese television series based on the novel of the same name written by Gu Man, starring Yang Yang and Zheng Shuang. It aired on Jiangsu TV and Dragon TV from 22 August to 6 September 2016. This story revolves around the love between Xiao Nai and Bei Weiwei. It was a commercial success in China. It became one of the most-watched Chinese modern dramas, with over 25.2 billion views online.

In August 2021, the show was officially banned by the People's Republic of China's government in the entirety of Mainland China as the female lead role, Zheng Shuang was labelled as "actors with poor conduct" by the regulators due to her involvement in a series of scandals, including tax evasion, which she was ultimately found guilty of committing.

== Synopsis ==
Bei Weiwei (Zheng Shuang) is a computer science university student who excels in her studies. She aspires to be an online game developer and spends her free time gaming. Her player's name is Luwei Weiwei in the role-playing game, A Chinese Ghost Story. After she is dumped by her online husband Zhenshui Wuxiang, she is approached by the number one player Yixiao Naihe, who suggests they get married so they both can participate in the couples in-game competitions. The newlyweds instantly hit it off and undergo many adventures together in-game.

However, Wei Wei did not expect the real identity of her in-game husband is a popular college senior, Xiao Nai (Yang Yang), who is both a jock and an academician. After they meet each other, they fall in love. Together, they overcome numerous misunderstandings and obstacles standing in the way of their budding romance.

== Cast ==
=== Main ===
Actor	Character	Introduction
Zheng Shuang	Bei Weiwei	A 2nd year computer science student. She is bright, intelligent and helpful, and aspires to be a game designer. Her player's name "Luwei Weiwei" in A Chinese Ghost Story, she is the only female player in the Top 10 PK ranking. She catches Xiao Nai's attention when she is playing the game in an internet cafe.
Yang Yang	Xiao Nai	A 4th year computer science student. He is the CEO of Zhi Yi Technology Company. He is gentle and kind and hides a cunning intellect. His player's name is "Yixiao Naihe", and he is the top player in the game A Chinese Ghost Story. In real life, Xiao Nai is a well-known man in campus, well-versed in arts, music, and sports. His player character has dark hair in the tv version.

=== Supporting ===
==== People at Qing University ====
Actor	Character	Introduction
Mao Xiaotong	Zhao Erxi	Wei Wei's best friend and one of Wei Wei's three dormmates. She's bright, cheerful, and stubborn at times. She falls for Cao Guang in the game A Chinese Ghost Story as Cao Guang mistook her web name for Wei Wei's and started to befriend her.
Bai Yu	Cao Guang	A second year foreign studies student. He initially misunderstood Wei Wei, but later develops a friendship with her, and a crush on her. After a series of mishaps, he also forms a friendship and budding romance with Erxi.
Ma Chunrui	Meng Yiran	The school's "belle", who placed first in the school's online beauty voting. She has a crush on Xiao Nai, and dislikes Weiwei because of it.
Qin Yu	Xiao Ling	Wei Wei's dorm mate. Because of her wealthy background, she is often referred to as "Little Rich Woman".
Song Yixing	Tian Sisi	Wei Wei's dorm mate. She is loyal, honest, and peppy, and shows care for her doormates.
Zhou Chenjia	Nana	Yiran's roommate. She constantly sucks up to Yiran and encourages her to pursue Xiao Nai. In reality, she dislikes Yiran and only befriends her to capture the attention of her cousin, Shaoxiang.
Zhang Chaoren	Da Zhong	Xiao Ling's boyfriend. Member of the senior class basketball team with Xiao Nai.
Chen Jie	Aixiang Nai'er / Ai Chanel	Yiran's friend. A famous online blogger, who posted degrading remarks about Weiwei online.

==== People in Zhi Yi Technology ====
Actor	Character	Introduction
Niu Junfeng	Yu Banshan	Known by the web name "Yugong Pashan". He often misuses idioms due to a childhood trauma. Member of the senior class basketball team. He is also Xiao Nai's dorm-mate, and also an employee at Zhi Yi.
Cui Hang	Qiu Yonghou	Known by the web name "Houzi Jiu". Member of the senior class basketball team. He is also Xiao Nai's dorm-mate, and also an employee at Zhi Yi.
Zheng Yecheng	Hao Mei	Known by the web name "Mo Zha Ta". He is also Xiao Nai's dorm-mate, and also an employee at Zhi Yi. One of the top 3 experts in Zhi Yi. He has a baby face, and is often called "Mr. Gorgeous", "Mr. Girly" or “Mr. Beauty”.
Vin Zhang	K.O.	A top hacker and one of the top 3 experts in Zhi Yi. He used to work in the cafeteria inside the campus. He shares a twisted fate with Hao Mei, whom he previously met in a game.
Hu Haobo	Ah Shuang	One of the top 3 experts in Zhi Yi. He supposedly, has a phobia of women, but really has a distrust of women in IT. He later betrayed Zhi Yi by revealing company secrets to Zhen Yi, and left the company.

==== Characters in A Chinese Ghost Story ====
Actor	Character	Introduction
Zhang He	Zhen Shaoxiang	Known by the web name "Zhenshui Wuxiang". He was Wei Wei's virtual ex-husband. He is Yiran's elder cousin and the heir of Zhen Yi technology. He judges people by appearance and he dumps Wei Wei thinking she is ugly and marries "Xiaoyu Yaoyao", but later regrets it when he sees Wei Wei in real life.
Liu Yinglun	Yu Yao	Known by the web name "Xiaoyu Yaoyao", leader of the Xiao Yu clan. She is regarded as the number one beauty of the game's server, after placing first in a photo competition. Zhenshui Wuxiang's virtual life and real-life partner. A hypocritical and attention-seeking person.
Lu Yunxuan	Leishen Nini	Wei Wei's guild mate. She loves to gossip.
Liu Yujin	Diemeng Weixing	Ex-leader of the "Jade Seas Rising Tide" guild and Zhan Tianxia's virtual wife and real-life partner. She hates the Xiaoyu gang as they caused her relationship with Zhan Tianxia to deteriorate, and she makes use of Weiwei's friendship with her to spite them in real life.
Zhang Shou	Zhan Tianxia	Current leader of the "Jade Seas Rising Tide" guild and Diemeng Weixing's virtual husband and real-life partner. He has an ambiguous relationship with Xiaoyu Qingqing.
Yang Xueying	Xiaoyu Qingqing	One of Xiaoyu Yaoyao's followers. She likes to flirt with male players, especially with Zhan Tianxia.
Song Yuqing	Xiaoyu Feifei	One of Xiaoyu Yaoyao's followers.
Liu Qianyu	Xiaoyu Mianmian	One of Xiaoyu Yaoyao's followers.
Xiao Xiaobai	Youming Guilao / "Underworld Granny"	A "boss" in the "underworld cave" dungeon, in the game, who likes to capture male players and make them her slaves (or toys).
Zhang Haoyu	Tianxia Dayi	

==== Others ====
Actor	Character	Introduction
Cai Gang	Professor Xiao	An archaeologist professor, and Xiao Nai's father, at Qing university.
Gu Kelly	Professor Lin	A history professor, and Xiao Nai's mother, at Qing university
Fu Jun	Old Bei	Bei Weiwei's father
Yang Manqin	Chen Fang	Bei Weiwei's mother
Bian Cheng	Xiao Yang	Wei Wei's 12 year old student, that she tutors, and introduces Cao Guang to, to tutor in English.
Cheng Gong	Mr. Zhen	CEO of Zhen Yi technology. Shaoxiang's father and Yiran's uncle. He uses underhanded means to try to steal Xiao Nai's game creation.
Leng Haiming	Mr. Li	Head of the gaming department at Zhen Yi technology.
Denny Huang	Feng Teng	President of Feng Teng Organization.
Liu Guhao	Mr. Wang	Feng Teng's employee.
Yang Yucheng	Professor Li Cheng	An economics professor, and Xiao Nai's uncle, at Qing university.

== Production ==
The series was filmed at Shanghai Songjiang University Town, East China University of Political Science and Law and Shanghai Commercial Plaza from September to December 2015.

The fictional game in the universe uses the content provided by A Chinese Ghost Story, a popular MMORPG game in China.

== Soundtrack ==
No.	Title	Lyrics	Music	Singer	Length
1.	"A Smile is Beautiful (一笑倾城)" (Opening theme song / Promotional theme song)	Finale	Silence Wang	Silence Wang (Version 1); Zhang He, Bai Yu, Vin Zhang, Cui Hang & Zheng Yecheng (Version 2)
2.	"Weiwei's Beautiful Smile (微微一笑很倾城)" (Ending theme song)	Silence Wang, Wei Yian	Silence Wang, Liu Yanjia	Yang Yang
3.	"The Next Second (下一秒)"	Silence Wang		Zhang Bichen
4.	"A Little Sweet (有点甜) -"	Silence Wang		Silence Wang, By2
5.	"A Possible Night (有可能的夜晚)"	Yico Zeng		Dong Zhen
6.	"Want to Meet Someone (想遇见一个人)"	Yao Ruolong	Zeng Manzi	Teresa Tseng

== Release ==
=== Domestic broadcast ===
Channel	Location	Broadcast start date	Note
Jiangsu TV, Dragon TV	People's Republic of China (the Mainland.)	22 August 2016	Monday to Sunday 19:30 - 21:00 (two eps)
Anhui TV	People's Republic of China (the Mainland)	24 August 2016	Daily 09:00 am
Shenzhen TV	People's Republic of China (the Mainland.)	29 September 2016	Every day 19:30 (two eps)
Jiangxi TV	People's Republic of China (the Mainland.)	28 January 2017	

=== International broadcast ===
Channel	Location	Broadcast start date	Note
DramaFever	U.S., Canada and Latin America	23 August 2016	Monday to Saturday (two eps)
Astro HD	Malaysia	25 August 2016	Monday to Friday 18:00 - 19:00
Zing TV	Vietnam		
CHOCO TV	The Republic of China (Taiwan.)	1 October 2016	
TVB J2	Hong Kong S.A.R.	10 January 2017	Monday to Friday 19:00 - 20:00
Home Drama	Japan	15 March 2017	Aired with title Cinderella is Online at 1:15
PPCTV 6	Cambodia	25 August 2017	Monday to Friday at 12:00 and 20:00
CTV 8 HD	Cambodia	January 2019	Saturday to Sunday
iMBC	South Korea	19 September 2017	
Channel 3	Thailand	3 March 2018	Every Saturday and Sunday at 16:30 - 18:00
GMA Network	Philippines	September 10, 2018 to October 19, 2018	January 16, 2019 to March 12, 2019 Rerun on GMA News TV every Monday to Friday at 23:00-00:00
MX Player	India	March 2021 - April 2021 Every Friday	March 2021 start aired 4 Episodes on MX Player and weekly episodes aired on every friday to April 2021.

=== 2026 streaming version ===
On 24 September 2026, the series was re-released for online streaming on Youku under the new title Yi Xiao Qing Cheng (Chinese: 一笑倾城; pinyin: Yīxiào qīngchéng). For its 2026 re-release, Zheng Shuang's appearance was digitally altered using artificial intelligence, with her face replaced by that of Wang Zhuyue.

== Reception ==
The series ranked first in television ratings and became the number one most searched and discussed topic online during its broadcast. The drama is also well-received internationally.

The drama was praised for following the details of the novel faithfully, as well as its refreshing and unique plot. Unlike most dramas, Love O2O does not succumb to overused cliches and plot devices, making it stand out from dramas with similar themes.

=== Ratings ===
China Dragon TV / Jiangsu TV premiere ratings (CSM50)
Episodes	Broadcast date	Dragon TV			Jiangsu TV		
Episodes	Broadcast date	Ratings (%)	Audience share (%)	Rankings	Ratings (%)	Audience share (%)	Rankings
1-2	2016.08.22	0.745	-	4	0.737	-	5
3-4	2016.08.23	0.716	-	6	0.73	-	5
5-6	2016.08.24	0.82	-	5	0.919	-	3
7-8	2016.08.25	0.774	-	5	0.873	-	4
9-10	2016.08.26	0.864	-	4	0.935	-	2
11	2016.08.27	0.927	-	3	1.151	-	2
12-13	2016.08.28	0.845	-	5	1.042	-	3
14-15	2016.08.29	0.912	-	5	0.998	-	3
16-17	2016.08.30	1	-	3	0.971	-	4
18-19	2016.08.31	0.927	-	4	0.904	-	5
20-21	2016.09.01	0.845	-	5	0.878	-	4
22-23	2016.09.02	1.105	-	2	1.065	-	3
24	2016.09.03	1.197	-	3	1.255	-	2
25-26	2016.09.04	0.992	-	4	1.121	-	2
27-28	2016.09.05	1.073	-	2	1.015	-	3
29-30	2016.09.06	0.967	-	3	0.999	-	2
Average ratings		0.910			0.965		

- Highest ratings are marked in red; lowest ratings are marked in blue.
- In China, 1% viewership rating is considered extremely high since the People's Republic of China has a large population. (1,441,494,608 as of Saturday, November 21, 2020)

== Awards and nominations ==
Year	Award	Category	Recipient	Result	Ref.
2017	2nd China Quality Television Drama Ceremony	Popular Quality Actor	Yang Yang	Won	
2017	2nd China Quality Television Drama Ceremony	Innovative Themed Drama of the Year	Love O2O	Won	

== See also ==
- Love O2O (film)
