= Jiangsu Television =

Jiangsu TV
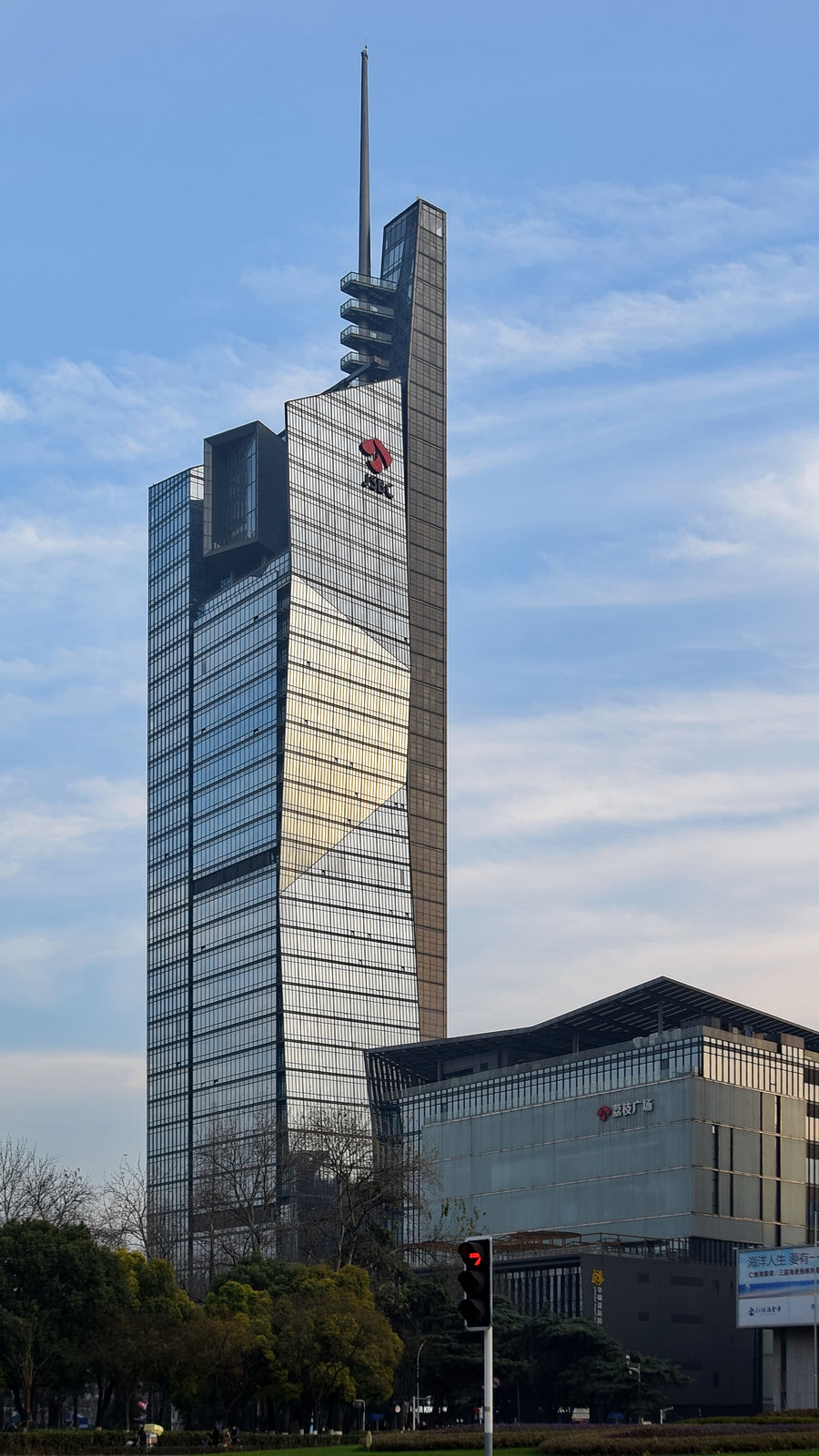
- JSTV headquarters in Nanjing

Ownership
- Owner: Jiangsu Broadcasting Corporation

History
- Launched: May 1, 1960; 66 years ago
- Former names: Nanjing TV (1963-1979); Jiangsu TV 1. Program (1979-1993); Jiangsu TV General Channel (1993-1997)

Links
- Website: 网上直播

Availability

Terrestrial
- Analog: VHF channel 1 (until December 31, 2020)
- Digital TV (DTMB): Various location

Jiangsu Television or Jiangsu TV (simplified Chinese: 江苏卫视; traditional Chinese: 江苏衞視; pinyin: Jiāngsū wèishì) is a state-owned provincial satellite TV station launched on May 1, 1960.

== History ==
On May 1, 1960, Nanjing TV Experimental Station (not the current Nanjing TV Station, the current Nanjing TV Station started broadcasting in 1981) started broadcasting.

In May 1979, Nanjing TV broadcast its first TV commercial.

On June 30, 1979, with the approval of the Jiangsu Provincial Committee of the Chinese Communist Party, Nanjing TV was renamed Jiangsu TV.

In 1993, Jiangsu TV Economic Channel (Channel 2, now City Channel) started broadcasting.

At the beginning of 2004, Jiangsu TV positioned itself as a channel with "information as its core and emotion as its feature", and on February 28, it held a press conference for Jiangsu TV's "China Emotional Feature Channel" in Nanjing.

On October 1, 2017, in order to implement the relevant provisions of the National Anthem Law of the People's Republic of China, Jiangsu TV must play the national anthem at 10:00 a.m. on important national statutory holidays and anniversaries such as National Day and International Labor Day. The national anthem tape is the same as the version broadcast by China Central Television (CCTV).

== Evolution of network names ==
- 1960-1968 - Nanjing Television Experimental Station (N.T.E.S) (南京电视台实验站)
- 1968-1979 - Nanjing Television Services (N.T.S) or commonly known as Nanjing Television (N.T.V) (南京电视台)
- 1979-1997 - Jiangsu Television - Programme One (江苏电视台-节目一) or commonly known as Jiangsu TV-1 (江苏电视台-1)
- 1997-present - Jiangsu TV (江苏卫视)
