= Gülnezer Bextiyar =

Chinese actress (born 1992)

Gülnezer Bextiyar 古力娜扎·拜合提亚尔
- گۈلنەزەر بەختىيار
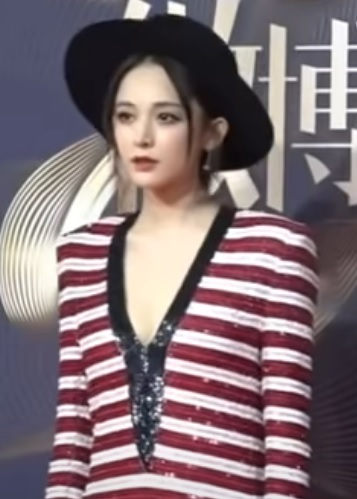
- Gülnezer in January 2019
- Born: 2 May 1992 (age 34); Ürümqi, Xinjiang, China
- Other names: Gulinazha, Nazha
- Education: Xinjiang Arts Institute; Beijing Film Academy (B.A.)
- Occupations: Actress; model
- Years active: 2011–present

Chinese name
- Simplified Chinese: 古力娜扎·拜合提亚尔
- Traditional Chinese: 古力娜扎·拜合提亞爾
- Hanyu Pinyin: Gǔlìnàzhā Bàihétíyàer

Uyghur name
- Uyghur: گۈلنەزەر بەختىيار
- Latin Yëziqi: Gülnezer Bextiyar

Gülnezer Bextiyar (/ɡjuːlˈnɛzər ˈbɛktɪjɑːr/; Uyghur: گۈلنەزەر بەختىيار, Chinese: 古力娜扎·拜合提亚尔; born 2 May 1992), also known by her pinyin transliteration name Gulinazha or its diminutive form Nazha, is a Chinese Uyghur actress and model who graduated from the Beijing Film Academy in 2011.

== Early life and education ==
Gülnezer was born on 2 May 1992 in Ürümqi, Xinjiang, China and is of Uyghur ethnicity. She attended Xinjiang Arts University, majoring in dancing when she was young. At the age of 16, she participated in a modeling contest where she took home the award for the "Most Photogenic". Gülnezer auditioned for the Beijing Film Academy in 2011. During the audition, her unique appearance received attention and her photos were taken and published online. Due to the exposure, she was discovered and signed on by Tangren Media.

== Career ==
In 2012, Gülnezer made her acting debut in the television series Xuan-Yuan Sword: Scar of Sky and rose to fame for her role as Yu Xiaoxue.

In 2013, Gülnezer made her big-screen debut in the police film Police Story 2013. She then starred in comedy film The Breakup Guru and action film Black & White: The Dawn of Justice, and received the Newcomer award at the Golden Phoenix Awards.

In 2016, Gülnezer played her first leading role in the fantasy historical drama The Classic of Mountains and Seas. The same year, she played the role of Diaochan in the historical fiction drama God of War, Zhao Yun; and the female lead in the fantasy action drama Chinese Paladin 5, based on the video game of the same title.

In 2017, Gülnezer starred in the fantasy action drama Fighter of the Destiny alongside Lu Han. The drama was a commercial success and attained high ratings during its run. The same year, she starred in the music film City of Rock as a rebellious guitar player. Her performance received positive reviews, and she was won the Breakthrough Actress award at the Huading Awards.

In 2018, Gülnezer was once again cast as Diaochan in the historical film Dynasty Warriors, based on the video game of the same name.

In 2019, Gülnezer starred in the romance drama Ten Years Late, based on the Japanese manga series Asunaro Hakusho alongside Shawn Dou; where she played a travel service product manager.

In 2021, Gülnezer starred in the crime action drama Dancing in the Storm as a criminal profiler, alongside William Chan.

== Other activities ==
=== Endorsements ===
In 2017, Gülnezer was chosen as Chinese brand ambassador for Italian luxury fashion brand Fendi.

In 2018, the jewelry brand Qeelin chose Gülnezer to become its ambassador.

In 2019, Sergio Rossi announced the appointment of Gülnezer as its first Brand Ambassador for the Greater China region. Gülnezer was also chosen as brand spokesperson for the eyewear brand PRSR.

In 2020, Chando announced Gülnezer as their global spokesperson for skincare products. Silk'n also announced Gülnezer as their brand global spokesperson.

In 2021, Triumph announced Gülnezer as their brand's first spokesperson for the Asia Pacific region.

In 2024, Saint Laurent announced that Gülnezer has become its Chinese ambassador.

== Personal life ==
On August 9, 2015, actor Hans Zhang revealed on Sina Weibo that he was in a relationship with his The Classic of Mountains and Seas co-star Gülnezer. On December 25, 2017, the representatives of both issued a statement stating that the two broke up amicably in mid-October 2017.

== Filmography ==
=== Film ===
Year	English title	Chinese title	Role	Notes/Ref.
2013	Police Story 2013	警察故事2013	Xiao Wei	
2014	The Breakup Guru	分手大师	Xiao Zhuang	
2014	Black & White: The Dawn of Justice	痞子英雄2：黎明再起	Li Xiaomu	
2014	The Boundary	全城通缉	Shao Yu	
2015	Lovers & Movies	爱我就陪我看电影	Jia Meng	
2015	A Privacy Safe	隐私保险箱	Chen Man	
2017	The Game Changer	游戏规则	Tang Qianqian	
2017	City of Rock	缝纫机乐队	Ding Jianguo	
2019	Voice of the Nation	为国而歌	Yuan Chunhui	
2021	Dynasty Warriors	真三国无双	Diaochan	
2022	Don't Forget I Love You	不要忘记我爱你	Xing Yue	
2022	Ordinary Hero	平凡英雄	Ainur	
2023	Puppy Love	爱犬奇缘	Qian Fei Fei	
2024	A Legend	传说	Princess Meng Yun	

=== Television series ===
Year	English title	Chinese title	Role	Network	Notes/Ref.
2012	Xuan-Yuan Sword: Scar of Sky	轩辕剑:天之痕	Yu Xiaoxue	Hunan TV	
2016	Legend of Nine Tails Fox	青丘狐传说	Tao Heng	Hunan TV	
2016	The Classic of Mountains and Seas	山海经之赤影传说	Sumo	Hunan TV	
2016	God of War, Zhao Yun	武神赵子龙	Diaochan	Hunan TV	
2016	Go! Goal! Fighting!	旋风十一人	Yu Fei	Dragon TV	Cameo
2016	First Love	柠檬初上	Ning Xiaomeng	Jiangsu TV	
2016	Chinese Paladin 5	仙剑云之凡	Tang Yurou	Hunan TV	
2017	Fighter of the Destiny	择天记	Xu Yourong	Hunan TV	
2019	Return the World to You	归还世界给你	Shen Yien	Jiangsu TV	
2019	Ten Years Late	十年三月三十日	Yuan Cai	iQiyi, Tencent	
2021	Twelve Legends	十二谭	Ye Ming	Youku	
2021	Weaving a Tale of Love	风起霓裳	Kudi Liuli	Hunan TV	
2021	The Dance of the Storm	风暴舞	Maggie Zhou	iQiyi, Tencent, Youku	
2023	Snow Eagle Lord	雪鹰领主	Yu Jingqiu	Tencent Video	
2023	Incomparable Beauty	无与伦比的美丽	Yu Jiaen	Jiangsu TV	
2023	Weaving a Tale of Love 2	风起西州 第二部	Kudi Liuli	Youku	
2023	Got a Crush on You	恋恋红尘	Song Xinchen	Viki	
2024	Fangs of Fortune	大梦归离	Shen Nv	iQIYI	Cameo
2025	The Journey of Legend	赴山海	Xiao Xueyu	iQIYI, Tencent Video	
2025	Glory	玉茗茶骨	Rong Shanbao	Hunan TV, Mango TV	
TBA	The Awake	醒来	Jin Bao	iQIYI	

=== Short film ===
Year	English title	Chinese title	Role	Notes/Ref.
2012	Xuanyuan Sword 7	轩辕剑7	Xiaoxue	
2012	Café. Un moment Lent	咖啡.慢活一刻	Nana	
2013	Xuanyuan Sword 6	轩辕剑6	Hu Yue	

=== Variety shows ===
Year	English title	Chinese title	Role	Notes/Ref.
2014	Keep Running	奔跑吧	Guest	Season 1 Episode 2
2015	Up Idol	偶像來了	Cast member	Season 1
2016	Day Day Up	天天向上	Guest	Aired 12 February
2017	Divas Hit the Road	花儿与少年	Cast member	Season 3
2017-2021	Happy Camp	快乐大本营	Guest	
2019-2020	Yes, I Do	喜欢你，我也是	Cast member	

=== Music video appearances ===
Year	English title	Chinese title	Album	Notes/Ref.
2012	"Red Dust Inn"	红尘客栈	Jay Chou	

== Discography ==
Year	English title	Chinese title	Album	Notes/Ref.
2019	"End of Time"	时光尽头		Return the World to You OST
2020	"You"	你		Sing for the Country OST
2020	"I Like You Too"	喜欢你，我也是		I Like You Too OST
2021	"Know Fate"	夜明		
2021	"Little Time"	周子萱		

== Awards and nominations ==
Year	Award	Category	Nominated work	Result	Ref.
2015	15th Golden Phoenix Awards	Newcomer Award	Black & White: The Dawn of Justice, The Breakup Guru	Won	
2017	22nd Huading Awards	Best Actress (Ancient Drama)	Chinese Paladin 5	Nominated	
2017	L'Officiel Fashion Night Influence Award	Hot Era Reader	—N/a	Won	
2017	6th iQiyi All-Star Carnival	Popular Artist Award	—N/a	Won	
2018	Weibo Awards Ceremony	Popular Artist Award	—N/a	Won	
2018	China Screen Ranking	Trend of the Year	—N/a	Won	
2018	23rd Huading Awards	Breakthrough Actress	City of Rock	Won	
2018	25th Cosmo Beauty Ceremony	Shining Beautiful Idol	—N/a	Won	
2018	Weibo Movie Awards Ceremony	Popularity Award	—N/a	Won	
2018	L'Officiel Night	Generation Transformation Award	—N/a	Won	
2019	Weibo Award Ceremony	Weibo Goddess	—N/a	Won	
2019	Golden Bud - The Fourth Network Film And Television Festival	Best Actress	Return the World to You, Ten Years Late	Nominated	
2019	Cosmo Glam Night	Dream Personality of the Year	—N/a	Won	
