= Kevin Chu =

Kevin Chu may refer to:

- Kevin Chu (filmmaker) (born 1950), Taiwanese film director and screenwriter
- Kevin Chu (actor) (born 1989), Hong Kong actor
