= Little Red Sweet =

2024 Hong Kong film by Vincent Chow

- Theatrical release poster
- Traditional Chinese: 紅豆
- Jyutping: Hung^{4} Dau^{6}
- Directed by: Vincent Chow
- Screenplay by: Joey Lok; Cao Guojian
- Produced by: Julia Chu; Catherine Hun
- Starring: Simon Yam; Stephy Tang; Jeffrey Ngai; Mimi Kung
- Cinematography: Yip Shiu-kei
- Edited by: William Chang; Lai Kwun-tung
- Music by: Kelvin Yuen
- Production company: Sil-Metropole
- Distributed by: Intercontinental Film
- Release dates: 2 October 2024 (LEAFF); 27 February 2025 (Hong Kong)
- Running time: 90 minutes
- Country: Hong Kong
- Language: Cantonese

Little Red Sweet (Chinese: 紅豆) is a 2024 Hong Kong family drama film directed by Vincent Chow in his feature film debut. Produced by Sil-Metropole, it stars Simon Yam, Stephy Tang, Jeffrey Ngai, and Mimi Kung. Set in Kowloon City, the film centers on a traditional Chinese dessert soup shop, where the owner's daughter (Tang) decides to abandon her dreams and return to run the family business, despite her father's (Yam) objection.

The film had its world premiere as the closing film at the 9th London East Asian Film Festival on 2 October 2024, followed by a theatrical release in Hong Kong on 27 February 2025. Simon Yam and Stephy Tang received nominations for Best Actor and Best Actress respectively in the 16th Golden Lotus Awards for their performances.

== Plot ==
May, whose family lives in Kowloon City near Kai Tak Airport, develops a passion for airplanes from a young age and becomes a flight attendant. However, her life takes a turn when her mother, Sau-lin, suffers a stroke and becomes unresponsive. This leaves her father, Hing, who runs a tong sui shop Cheung Hing Kee, relying on May's younger brother Kai-cheong, for support. Kai-cheong, feeling unqualified to help in the shop, chooses to hide at home, leaving Hing to manage alone. Concerned for her father's well-being and frustrated by her brother's reluctance, May decides to quit her job and return to Cheung Hing Kee. Despite her intentions, Hing resists her involvement in the kitchen and scolds her when she attempts to make the red bean soup.

Years later, Sau-lin remains in a vegetative state, and May has become a regular staff member at Cheung Hing Kee. The tension between her and Hing eases, but he still hesitates to let her into the kitchen. At her best friend's wedding banquet, May meets travel writer Soar. Soar is intrigued by her when she critiques the red bean soup served there, and he accepts May's invitation to try the authentic version at Cheung Hing Kee. When he visits, he surprises May and helps her fix her bicycle, which she uses for delivering dessert soups. Their friendship blossoms, and Soar reveals he plans to stay in Hong Kong as a journalist for May. They soon confirm their relationship and start dating. Kai-cheong discusses Sau-lin's condition with May, suggesting they either close the shop or forego expensive medical treatment for their mother. May dismisses both options, but Sau-lin overhears their conversation and sheds a tear. Shortly after, Sau-lin passes away while Hing visits her. Following her death, Hing's attitude toward May softens, revealing that he actually worries about May, as she accidentally burned herself one time when she was playing in the kitchen as a child. May confronts him about his previous antagonism, and he begins to teach her how to make red bean soup, including a secret step of adding salt to balance the flavor.

However, they soon learn that their building has over 80% of its properties sold and will face forced auction. May insists that the shop represents their parents' hard work and initially refuses to sell. She protests on social media but gains little traction. Kai-cheong suggests she give up, and surprisingly, Hing agrees, believing they cannot compete with real estate hegemony. They ultimately close the shop, which sees a surge of customers on its final day. Soar informs May of his plans to move to Canada and asks her to join him. Meanwhile, a neighbor Gan offers his shop to Hing as he considers retirement, prompting Hing to reopen Cheung Hing Kee. At last, May decides to break up with Soar and stays with her father and brother to continue running the dessert soup shop.

== Cast ==
- Simon Yam as Cheung Hing, a Teochew-origin traditional Chinese dessert shop owner
- Stephy Tang as May, an aspiring flight attendant and Hing's elder daughter
- Jeffrey Ngai as Kai-cheong, a university student and Hing's younger brother
- Mimi Kung as Sau-lin, Hing's wife who runs the dessert shop with him

Also appearing in the film are Kevin Chu as Soar Orr, a Canada-born travel writer and eventual boyfriend of May; Amy Lo as Jessica, a flight attendant colleague of May; Henry Fong Ping and Alice Fung So-bor as Uncle and Mrs. Gan, neighbours of the Cheungs' dessert shop.

== Production ==
=== Development ===
Advertisement director Vincent Chow became inspired to make a film after reading an interview with a flight attendant who left her job to help her family-run restaurant. He centered the film around red bean soup, as red beans symbolize "longing for family" in Chinese culture, referencing Tang dynasty poet Wang Wei's poem "Longing". Chow based the screenplay on his real-life experiences and chose to depict the protagonist's family as Teochew people, influenced by a Teochew friend of his and his observations of traditional gender hierarchy within their culture, which fitted the film's themes. Stephy Tang also noted that the characters' frequent conflicts in the film could be explained by their Teochew background, which is associated with a stereotypical grumpy nature. In February 2024, the film received HK$3.32 million in funding from the Film Development Council, with Tang and Simon Yam confirmed as the lead cast, and marking Chow's feature debut. To prepare for their roles, Simon Yam and Stephy Tang learned to make red bean soup from real tong sui chefs before filming, and Yam would add tongyuen to the soup and take it home for his wife to consume. Chow also cast Jeffrey Ngai, who had previously worked with him on an advertisement, using him as a model for his character while writing the script. A Taiwanese actor, who Chow described as "well-known", was initially cast in a lead role but had to drop out due to a COVID-19 infection just before filming, which led to a rewrite of the screenplay.

=== Filming and post-production ===
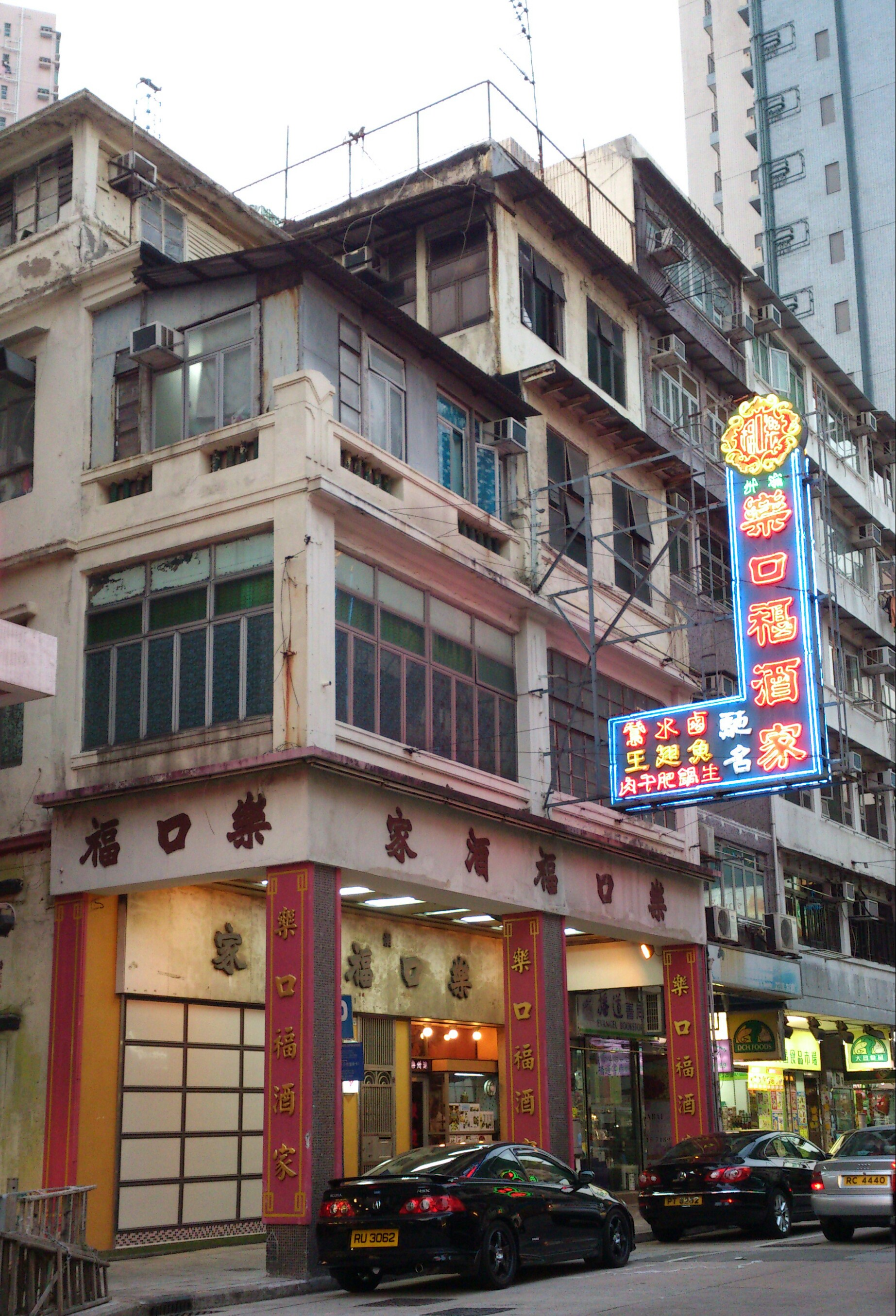
Filming took place at Lok Hau Fook Restaurant in Kowloon City

Principal photography began on 19 January 2024 in Kowloon City. Chow chose the district because it was undergoing demolition and was home to several landmarks, including the former Kai Tak Airport. Although he planned to shoot on location, time and crew size constraints forced the team to construct Cheung Hing Kee, the traditional dessert shop owned by Yam's character and a main set for the film, at a studio in Clearwater Bay. The crew managed to film several scenes at Lok Hau Fook Restaurant in Kowloon City, which was used as the set for a tailor shop set owned by Henry Fong Ping's character, along with a few scenic shots. Filming wrapped up on 29 January 2024.

The film was edited by Lai Kwun-tung, with his mentor William Chang serving as the editing supervisor. Chang explained that his involvement aimed to pass on his editing skills to his apprentice Lai by providing him with hands-on opportunities. He also infused his signature editing style and opted for a warm color tone as he felt the story conveyed a more heartfelt family drama. In May 2024, the film was presented at the Cannes Film Market. From 11 February to 15 March 2025, a Pacific Coffee branch on Victory Avenue in Mong Kok was renovated into Cheung Hing Kee, with props used during filming exhibited there as part of the film's marketing campaign.

== Release ==
Little Red Sweet had its world premiere as the closing film of the 9th London East Asian Film Festival on 2 October 2024. It premiered at Causeway Bay, Hong Kong, on 20 February 2025, followed by a theatrical release in Hong Kong on 28 February. The film was also screened at the 28th Sonoma International Film Festival.

== Reception ==
Edmund Lee of the South China Morning Post gave Little Red Sweet 2.5/5 stars, finding it to be a "well-meaning family drama" that explores generational conflict and real estate hegemony but ultimately describes it as "stale" and "undercooked in its dramatic expression", lacking the emotional depth needed to elevate the story despite having a strong cast. Keith Ho, writing for HK01, described the film as "heartfelt" and adequately capturing the essence of Hong Kong spirit through the lens of a family's struggles and the significance of their traditional dessert shop, while also addressing themes of generational conflict and the challenges of urban redevelopment.

== Awards and nominations ==
| Year | Award | Category | Nominee | Result | Ref. |
|---|---|---|---|---|---|
| 2024 | 2024 Chinese American Film Festival | Golden Angel Award | —N/a | Won | |
| 2024 | 16th Golden Lotus Awards | Best Actor | Simon Yam | Nominated | |
| 2024 | 16th Golden Lotus Awards | Best Actress | Stephy Tang | Nominated | |
