= See Her Again =

2024 Hong Kong television series

Chinese name
- Traditional Chinese: 太陽星辰
Transcriptions
Yue: Cantonese
- Jyutping: Taai^{3} Joeng^{4} Sing^{1} San^{4}
- Genre: Crime, Mystery, Time-travel
- Written by: Tong Yiu-leung
- Directed by: Wong Kwok-keung
- Starring: William Chan; Cya Liu
- Countries of origin: China, Hong Kong
- Original languages: Cantonese, Mandarin
- No. of seasons: 1
- No. of episodes: 18

Production
- Production location: Hong Kong
- Cinematography: Ng Man Ching
- Production companies: Drama Apple, Tencent Video

Original release
- Network: Tencent, Netflix
- Release: November 20 – December 2, 2024

See Her Again (Chinese: 太陽星辰) is a Hong Kong television series starring William Chan and Cya Liu. It is the only Asian show selected to compete for the Coup de Coeur Award at MIPTV's MIPDrama Screenings in April 2024. It is also the first Chinese drama to be broadcast simultaneously on Tencent and Netflix.

== Synopsis ==
In 1993, a police senior inspector Yeung Kwong Yiu (William Chan) is knocked unconscious when investigating a crime and wakes in 2018 in an elevator. He partners with a police constable (Cya Liu) in 2018 to solve a series of mysterious murder cases from the past and present

== Cast ==
Actor	Character	Introduction
William Chan	Yeung Kwong Yiu / Chan Ka Kit	1993 Major Crime Division Senior Inspector, 2018 Major Crime Division Constable (as Chan Ka Kit)
Cya Liu	Chan Hoi Ching	2018 Major Crime Division Constable
Stephen Fung	Chan Tsz Tsun	Coroner, Chan Hoi Ching's foster father
Tse Kwan Ho	Yip Shing	1993 Major Crime Division Head (Chief Inspector), 2018 Senior Assistant Commissioner of Operations
Niki Chow	Chow Man Yi	Criminal Psychologist, Chan Hoi Ching's foster mother
Kevin Chu	Cheung Tin Ming	2018 Major Crime Division Senior Inspector
Alan Luk	Lau Wai To	1993 Major Crime Division Constable, 2018 Major Crime Division Chief Inspector
Ling Man-lung	Mak Chi Hung	Air-conditioning repairman who has schizophrenia
He Dujuan	Ho Pui Kit	Yeung Kwong Yiu's wife
Ben Yuen	Tang Hung Fat	Gang triad leader (Episode 1), property magnate
Hugo Ng	Adam Sundess	Philanthropist, main antagonist
Evergreen Mak	Shek Tat Chi	Businessman, follower of Adam Sundess
Stephanie Che	Chong Hiu Wah	Business woman, Life Balance beauty group founder, follower of Adam Sundess
Sean Wong	Ah Bao	Imaginary friend in Mak Chi Hung's hallucination
German Cheung	Blind Dart	Gang triad member, follower of Adam Sundess
Penny Chan	Seng Kui	2018 Major Crime Division Police Sergeant
Frank Huang	Banana	2018 Major Crime Division Police Constable
Jason Wu	Ah Fai	2018 Major Crime Division Police Constable
Deon Cheng	Chai Tou	1993 Major Crime Division Police Sergeant
Jeana Ho	Lam Mun Chi	1993 Major Crime Division Police Constable
Wong Ting Him	Feng	1993 Major Crime Division Police Constable
Sammy Sum	Cheung Keong	Fireman, Cheung Tin Ming's father
Kathy Yuen	Chung Yee	Mak Chi Hung's secondary school mate
Kumer So	Tiger	

== Awards and nominations ==
Award	Category	Recipients	Result
Chinese American TV Festival Golden Angel Awards	Best Web Series	See Her Again	Won
30th Asian Television Awards	Best Drama Series (OTT)	See Her Again	Nominated
30th Asian Television Awards	Best Actor in a Leading Role	William Chan	Nominated
16th Macau International Television Festival; Golden Lotus Awards	Best Drama	See Her Again	Nominated
16th Macau International Television Festival; Golden Lotus Awards	Best Director	Wong Kwok Keung	Nominated
16th Macau International Television Festival; Golden Lotus Awards	Best Screenplay	Tong Yiu Leung	Nominated
16th Macau International Television Festival; Golden Lotus Awards	Best Cinematography	Ng Mun Ching	Nominated
16th Macau International Television Festival; Golden Lotus Awards	Best Actor	William Chan	Nominated
16th Macau International Television Festival; Golden Lotus Awards	Best Supporting Actor	Stephen Fung	Nominated
16th Macau International Television Festival; Golden Lotus Awards	Best Supporting Actress	Nikki Chow	Nominated
