= Mr. Right (TV series) =

2018 Chinese television series

- Drama poster
- Genre: Romantic comedy
- Written by: Li Xiao; Zhang Yingji
- Directed by: Yao Xiaofeng
- Starring: Jin Dong; Jiang Shuying
- Country of origin: China
- Original language: Mandarin
- No. of seasons: 1
- No. of episodes: 45

Production
- Cinematography: Beijing, Las Vegas, Belgium
- Running time: 45 mins
- Production company: Yida Media Changjiang Culture

Original release
- Network: Dragon TV; Jiangsu TV
- Release: 12 January – 7 February 2018

Related
- To Be a Better Man

Mr. Right (Chinese: 恋爱先生) is a 2018 Chinese television series starring Jin Dong and Jiang Shuying. It is the second installment of the 'Gentleman' series following To Be a Better Man (2016). The series is airing on Jiangsu TV and Dragon TV starting January 12, 2018.

Despite its high ratings, the series has received mixed critical reviews and audience response.

== Synopsis ==
The story follows three men as they find their significant other. Cheng Hao is a successful Beijing dentist, who on his free time likes to give advice on how to pursue women. He hasn't been in love before. During a business trip in Antwerp, he clashes with Luo Yue, who is wary of men and relationships. Back in Beijing, the two individuals continue to war — and gradually becomes close. Meanwhile, Cheng Hao's business partner Zhang Mingyang seeks his advice on how to pursue a girl, and she turns out to be none other than Gu Yao, Cheng Hao's university crush. His friend, Zou Beiye also seeks Cheng Hao's advice on how to pursue Qiao Yilin, a supermodel.

== Cast ==
=== Main ===
- Jin Dong as Cheng Hao
  - A dentist of a high-end clinic, and also an online love expert who gives out relationship advice.
- Jiang Shuying as Luo Yue
  - A hotel manager. She has been hurt by numerous men and becomes wary of relationships.
- Li Naiwen as Zhang Mingyang
  - Cheng Hao's business partner. He is a flirtatious man with numerous relationships but changes into a loyal man after he falls in love with Gu Yao.
- Xin Zhilei as Gu Yao
  - Cheng Hao's former classmate and ideal lover. A beautiful and talented girl admired by many.
- Calvin Li as Song Ningyu
  - Luo Yue's pursuer, Gu Yao's former husband.
- Tian Yu as Zou Beiye
  - Cheng Hao's business partner.
- Song Yanfei as Qiao Yilin
  - A model with a straightforward and adorable personality. She has a love-hate relationship with Zou Beiye.

=== Supporting ===
- Ni Dahong as Cheng Hongdou, Cheng Hao's father.
- Cui Yi as Liu Zhenzhen, Luo Yue's mother.
- Zhugang Reyao as Wang Yan
- Kang Ning as Xu Le
- Wang Sen as Du Kai
- Yin Xu as Chen Jing
- Cheng Haofeng as Wang Ning
- Luo Yukun as Shan Shan
- Chu Shuanzhong as Wu Fei
- Wang Qing as Guo Min
- Chen Xinxuan as Xiao Mei, Head nurse at Cheng Hao's clinic.
- Xia Nan as Yoyo

== Production ==
The series is produced and written by the team behind To Be a Better Man. William Chang acts as the style director. It was filmed in Beijing (China), Las Vegas (United States of America) and Antwerp (Belgium) between April and August 2017.

== Soundtrack ==
| No. | Title | Lyrics | Music | Singers | Length |
|---|---|---|---|---|---|
| 1. | "LOVE" (Opening theme) | | Tan Xuan |
| 2. | "Happiness (欢喜)" (Ending theme) | Wen Ya | Mo Juelin | Lisa Ono & Jin Dong (version 1), Lisa Ono (version 2) |
| 3. | "Only Left By Myself (剩下了自己)" (Interlude) | Yu Honglong | Yu Honglong | Angela Chang |
| 4. | "This Kind of Innocence (这种天真)" (Interlude) | Wang Yuanxing | Tan Yulong | Joey Yung |
| 5. | "Literary Youth (文艺少年)" (Interlude) | Liu Chang | Tan Xuan | Zhang Lei |
| 6. | "Law of Attraction (吸引力法则)" (Interlude) | Duan Sisi | Tan Xuan | Zhao Tianyu & Zhou Zhennan |
| 7. | "Still Fall in Love (还是爱了)" (Interlude) | Jiang Shengnan | Dan Yulong | Ceng Di |
| 8. | "The Next Love (下一个爱情)" (Interlude) | Da Houzai | Hou Zhiteng | Jiang Shuying & Ma Bosai (Victor) |
| 9. | "The One Pretending to be Asleep (装睡的人)" (Interlude) | Cui Shu | Zhang Jiacheng | Cui Zige |
| 10. | "Daring" (Interlude) | Mo Yanlin | Mo Yanlin | Mo Yanlin |
| 11. | "Warmth (温暖)" (Theme song) | Huang Hui | Huang Xingrui | Jin Dong |

== Reception ==
=== Ratings ===
- Highest ratings are marked in red, lowest ratings are marked in blue

| Broadcast date | Dragon TV CSM52 ratings | | | Jiangsu TV CSM52 ratings | | |
| Broadcast date | Ratings (%) | Audience share (%) | Rank | Ratings (%) | Audience share (%) | Rank |
|---|---|---|---|---|---|---|
| 2018.1.12 | 1.01 | 3.3 | 1 | 0.517 | 1.69 | 7 |
| 2018.1.13 | 0.974 | 3.17 | 1 | 0.399 | 1.3 | 7 |
| 2018.1.14 | 0.902 | 2.95 | 3 | 0.499 | 1.63 | 7 |
| 2018.1.15 | 0.963 | 3.18 | 2 | 0.679 | 2.24 | 5 |
| 2018.1.16 | 1.056 | 3.49 | 2 | 0.862 | 2.86 | 4 |
| 2018.1.17 | 1.23 | 4.06 | 1 | 0.822 | 2.72 | 5 |
| 2018.1.18 | 1.283 | 4.14 | 1 | 0.966 | 3.13 | 4 |
| 2018.1.19 | 1.247 | 4.01 | 1 | 1.008 | 3.24 | 2 |
| 2018.1.20 | 1.472 | 4.72 | 1 | 0.92 | 2.96 | 3 |
| 2018.1.21 | 1.488 | 4.65 | 1 | 0.986 | 3.09 | 4 |
| 2018.1.22 | 1.566 | 4.98 | 1 | 1.047 | 3.43 | 3 |
| 2018.1.23 | 1.594 | 5.08 | 1 | 1.081 | 3.44 | 3 |
| 2018.1.24 | 1.679 | 5.29 | 1 | 1.098 | 3.47 | 3 |
| 2018.1.25 | 1.762 | 5.42 | 1 | 1.207 | 3.72 | 3 |
| 2018.1.26 | 1.628 | 5.084 | 1 | 1.089 | 3.402 | 2 |
| 2018.1.27 | 1.660 | 5.081 | 1 | 1.233 | 3.781 | 2 |
| 2018.1.28 | 1.739 | 5.272 | 1 | 1.079 | 3.277 | 3 |
| 2018.1.29 | 1.834 | 5.65 | 1 | 1.144 | 3.54 | 3 |
| 2018.1.30 | 1.777 | 5.472 | 1 | 1.214 | 3.754 | 3 |
| 2018.1.31 | 1.849 | 5.88 | 1 | 1.199 | 3.83 | 3 |
| 2018.2.1 | 1.988 | 6.292 | 1 | 1.172 | 3.722 | 3 |
| 2018.2.2 | 1.906 | 6.126 | 1 | 1.218 | 3.920 | 2 |
| 2018.2.3 | 1.727 | 5.55 | 1 | 1.214 | 3.91 | 2 |
| 2018.2.4 | 1.874 | 5.98 | 1 | 1.082 | 3.46 | 3 |
| 2018.2.5 | 2.007 | 6.357 | 1 | 1.226 | 3.896 | 3 |
| 2018.2.6 | 1.894 | 6.14 | 1 | 1.214 | 3.94 | 3 |
| 2018.2.7 | 1.915 | 6.08 | 1 | 1.281 | 4.09 | 4 |
| Average ratings | 1.561 | 4.97 | 1 | 1.026 | 3.28 | 3 |

=== Awards and nominations ===
| Award | Category | Nominated work | Result | Ref. |
|---|---|---|---|---|
| 24th Huading Awards | Best Actress (Modern Drama) | Jiang Shuying | Nominated | |
| 24th Huading Awards | Best Supporting Actor | Li Naiwen | Won | |
| 24th Huading Awards | Best Newcomer | Song Yanfei | Nominated | |
| Influence of Recreational Responsibilities Awards | TV Drama of the Year | | Won | |
