= Golden Brother =

2014 Hong Kong-Chinese film by Shu Kai-chung

- Golden Brother poster
- Directed by: Chung Shu-Kai
- Screenplay by: Kwok Kin-Lok
- Story by: Kwok Kin-Lok; Chung Shu-Kai; Sit Ho-Ching
- Produced by: Checkley Sin; Chow Kian; Cho Kingman; Jacky Yau
- Starring: Bosco Wong; William Chan; Michael Tse; King Kong Lee; Stephy Tang
- Cinematography: Chow Chi-Fai
- Edited by: Wenders Li
- Music by: Lincoln Lo
- Production companies: Cayie Movie & Video Communication Co.; J.J. Nicam Film; National Arts Films Production
- Distributed by: Starbright Communications
- Release dates: 18 September 2014 (Hong Kong); 24 December 2014 (China)
- Running time: 104 minutes
- Countries: Hong Kong; China
- Languages: Mandarin; Cantonese
- Box office: ¥3.9 million (China)

Golden Brother (simplified Chinese: 男人不可以穷; traditional Chinese: 男人唔可以窮; pinyin: nán rén bù kě yǐ qióng; Jyutping: naam4 m4 ho2 ji5 kung4) is a 2014 romance comedy drama film directed by Shu Kai Chung. A Hong Kong-Chinese co-production, the film was released in Hong Kong on September 18 and in China on December 24.

== Cast ==
- Bosco Wong
- William Chan
- Michael Tse
- King Kong Lee
- Stephy Tang
- Zhao Rong
- Rose Chan
- Timmy Hung
- Liu Kai-chi
- Mini Kung
- Angelina Lo
- Emily Kwan
- Benz Hung
- Cheng Sze-kwan
- Luk Wing-kuen
- Ting Yu Chow
- Edward Chui
- Deep Ng
- Angela Qiu

== Reception ==
By December 25, 2014, the film had earned ¥13.76 million at the Chinese box office.

== Awards and nominations ==
Award	Category	Nominee	Result	Ref.
6th China Image Film Festival	Best Small-Medium Budget Film	Golden Brother	Won	-
6th China Image Film Festival	Best Leading Actor	Bosco Wong	Won	-
6th China Image Film Festival	Best Young Actor	William Chan	Won	
6th Macau International Movie Festival	Best Director	Shu Kai Chung	Won	-
6th Macau International Movie Festival	Best Actor	Bosco Wong	Nominated	-
6th Macau International Movie Festival	Best Supporting Actor	William Chan	Nominated	-

== Notes ==
1.Given for the Traditional Chinese is the Cantonese translation, as 唔 is not used in Mandarin, with 不 being preferred in both Traditional and Simplified.
