= Checkley Sin =

Hong Kong movie producer

- 冼國林
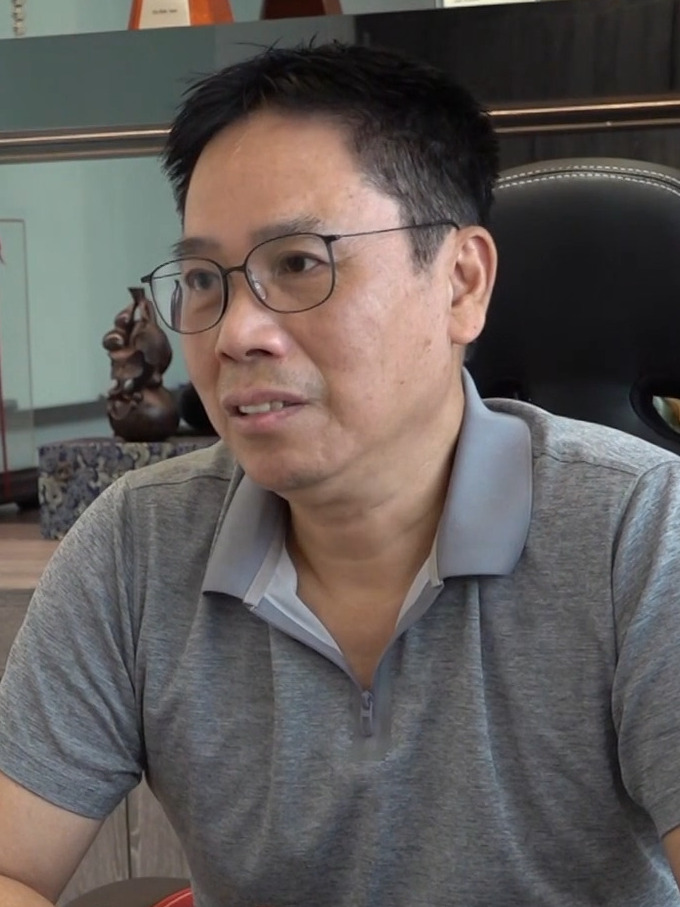
- Born: Checkley Sin Kwok-lam; 1956 or 1957 (age 68–69)
- Education: Oklahoma City University

Checkley Sin Kwok-lam (Chinese: 冼國林, 1956 or 1957) is a Hong Kong movie producer and social activist.

Sin was known as the first person to declare his candidacy for the 2022 Hong Kong Chief Executive election. He later withdrew from the election, leaving John Lee as the sole candidate for the election.

== Early life and personal life ==
Sin was born in 1956 or 1957. Prior to 1997, he was a police officer in Hong Kong for one year. Sin has an MBA degree from Oklahoma City University.

== Politics ==
Sin is widely known for his pro-Beijing stances, as he supported the legislation of the 2020 Hong Kong national security law. He has also criticised the actions of the pro-democracy camp on FinTV, an online finance news broadcast channel

Sin ran for the position of Hong Kong's Chief Executive in 2022, stating that he would focus on improving people's livelihood by tackling housing and medical issues. Sin also said he would finish national security legislation for Article 23 under the Basic Law within one year, as well as amending the ordinances on trade unions and societies during his term. Additionally, he proposed amending the Protection of the Harbour Ordinance. Sin proposed to minimize the time of public housing waiting from 6 years to 3 years. He has also pledged to solve the problems of all subdivided flats, cage homes and homeless people, as well as redistribution of land resources within 5 years. He proposed an alternate site for the East Lantau Metropolis, suggesting that developing Lamma Island would be much more effective than using twenty years for reclaiming 1700 acres of land for the East Lantau Metropolis. He stated that if the government reclaims land on the southwestern part of Lamma Island, they can obtain more than 1500 acres of land within three years. For transportation issues, he suggested that the government should build a three-kilometre long and six-lane bridge to connect Lamma Island with Hong Kong Island as the island is currently only accessible to the public through maritime transportation. Additionally, he also proposed a “mega-prison” on Lamma Island to “concentrate all prisons and correction institutions in one place” and leave hundreds of hectares of land available in urban areas. Moreover, he has proposed to transform Lamma Island into a 'Chinese-style tourism and water sports centre, with coastal towns, seafood restaurants, and a leisure and tourism centre that can hold up to 400 to 500 thousand guests at one time'. Sin also suggested relocating all disciplinary forces training centres to Tsing Yi, while moving most of the cemeteries and columbaria to Kau Sai Chau and Jin Island to release land in developed regions of the city. Sin also said that if the Protection of the Harbour Ordinance were amended, the waters between the old Kai Tak Airport and the Kwun Tong coastline could be developed within two years.

Sin withdrew from the 2022 Hong Kong Chief Executive election in April 2022, leaving John Lee as the sole running candidate of the election.

== Filmography ==
Year	Movie	Role
2008	Ip Man	Publisher
2010	The Legend Is Born: Ip Man	Director, Storywriter, Martial Arts Director, Publisher
2011	The Woman Knight of Mirror Lake	Director, Publisher
2013	Ip Man: The Final Fight	Director, Storywriter, Publisher
2014	Golden Brother	Publisher
2017	Our Days in 6E	Director, Screenwriter, Publisher

== Business career ==
Sin is the Vice President of the World Wing Chun Union, a martial arts organization. Sin is Chairman for National Arts Entertainment & Culture Group. He is also Associate of The Hong Kong Institute of Bankers.

== Philanthropy ==
In 2022, Sin pledged a $5 million donation to the Lau Kar-leung Charity Foundation, which funds stuntmen's medical costs due to injury.
