= The Dance of the Storm =

- Traditional Chinese: 風暴舞
- Simplified Chinese: 风暴舞
- Hanyu Pinyin: Fēngbào Wǔ
- Genre: Action; Crime; Romance
- Directed by: Liu Xin
- Starring: William Chan; Gulnazar
- Country of origin: China
- Original language: Mandarin
- No. of seasons: 1
- No. of episodes: 43

Production
- Production locations: Beijing, Seoul
- Production companies: Ciwen Media iQiyi

Original release
- Network: iQiyi; Tencent; Youku
- Release: April 25, 2021

The Dance of the Storm (Chinese: 风暴舞; pinyin: Fēngbào Wǔ) is a Chinese television series starring William Chan and Gulnazar. The series started filming on May 5, 2018, at Beijing, and finished filming on October 8, 2018. It premiered on iQiyi, Tencent and Youku on 25 April 2021.

== Synopsis ==
Clark Li Junjie works in MOIS, an information security company where he gets framed and becomes a wanted man after accidentally discovering the company's complicated dealings with external parties. During investigations, he uncovers the truth behind his parents' deaths 16 years ago.

== Cast ==
=== Main ===
- William Chan as Clark Li Junjie, senior agent in MOIS who returns after leaving suddenly 3 years ago
- Gulnazar as Maggie Zhou Zixuan, senior agent in MOIS, Li Junjie's girlfriend

=== Supporting ===
- Guo Jiahao as Shi Yunhao, senior agent in MOIS, Li Junjie's childhood friend
- Cecilia Boey as Chen Jingwen, IT assistant in ARK group, likes Li Junjie
- Qin Mingrui as Ma Ya, IT specialist in MOIS
- Wang Tonghui as Meng Liang, wanted man who had ties with Li Junjie's parents
- Chen Chuhan as Jia Lai, killer working for Ruan Taiyuan
- Leo Dong YanLei as A-Gu, killer working for Ruan Taiyuan
- Angela Gao Liwen as Hasan, killer
- Guo Guangping as Chen Gang, Li Junjie's mentor
- Ji Dongran as Deng Zhicheng, agent in MOIS
- Candice Zhao Qian as Lin Jin, agent in MOIS
- Zhang Bozhi as Xiao Zheng, assistant working for Meng Liang
- Zhang Song as Ma Xiaojun, agent in MOIS who likes Ma Ya

=== Special appearance ===
- Simon Yam as Mu Chuan, director of MOIS, Zhou Zixuan's foster father
- Jiang Wenli as Ruan Taiyuan, internationally wanted criminal
- Wu Gang as Ma Qiming, president of ARK group, Shi Yunhao's father
- Heidi Wang Ji as Amanda Zheng Peini, inspector from MOIS headquarters
- Auguste Kwan as Lin Feng, inspector from MOIS headquarters

== Soundtrack ==
No.	Title	Performer	Length
1.	"Leave like the Wind 像风一样离开"	William Chan	04:18
2.	"Vacant 空空"	Li Jiacheng	03:21
3.	"Forgive Me"	Yu Wenwen	03:33
4.	"Always be with you 专属蓝天"	Liu Yuning	04:36
5.	"Small Times 小光阴"	Gulnazar	04:01
6.	"Save My Love 救兵"	Su Shiding	04:41
7.	"Ni Nan 呢喃"	Liu Yuning	04:22
8.	"Reborn 重生"	Zheng Yunlong	04:09
9.	"Empty 纸上谈心"	Yuan Chengjie	05:07
10.	"The Dense Fog 雾"	Bu Cai	04:00
11.	"Love 爱着爱着"	Gao Jialang	04:17
12.	"Talking to Oneself 自言自语"	Li Yuner	04:05
13.	"Here You Are 遠在心中的你"	A-Lin	03:44
14.	"Always Be With You 燈塔"	Li Yuner	03:56
15.	"Kite and the Tree 風爭與树"	Liu Xijun	05:07
16.	"Floating Light 浮光"	Li Jiawei	04:06
17.	"Backflow 倒流"	Ju Jingyi	03:12
18.	"Missing You 你懂的思念"	Huang Xiaoyun	03:57
19.	"Rise with the wind 乘風而起"	Shen Yicheng	03:24
20.	"Running towards you across the storm 越過風暴奔向你"	Li Yuner	03:12
