= Age of Legends =

2018 Chinese television series

- Genre: Action; Crime
- Based on: Cheng Hong Nian Dai by Xiao Qi Xiao
- Written by: Zhou Yu; Zhang Danjuan
- Directed by: Liu Xin
- Starring: William Chan; Ma Sichun
- Country of origin: China
- Original language: Mandarin
- No. of seasons: 1
- No. of episodes: 47

Production
- Production locations: Beijing, Tianjin
- Running time: 45 mins
- Production company: Croton Media (Kuanhou Culture Media)

Original release
- Network: Zhejiang TV, Dragon TV
- Release: September 17 – October 13, 2018

Age of Legends
- Simplified Chinese: 橙红年代
Transcriptions
Standard Mandarin
- Hanyu Pinyin: Cheng Hong Nian Dai

Age of Legends (Chinese: 橙红年代) is a Chinese television series starring William Chan and Ma Sichun. It is based on the novel of the same name by Xiao Qi Xiao (骁骑校). The series started filming on August 3, 2017 at Beijing and finished in December 2017. It was broadcast on Zhejiang TV and Dragon TV from September 17 to October 11, 2018.

== Synopsis ==
Eight years ago, Liu Ziguang (William Chan) left Jiang Bei City after his father's death. He met Nie Wanfeng (Liu Yijun) and became "sworn" brothers with him. The two worked for an American crime boss named Colby, who locked Ziguang away for four years. However Ziguang trained himself and managed to escape, eventually being recruited by Wanfeng to join his syndicate after Colby's death. After learning of Wanfeng's true and malicious nature, Ziguang tipped the police off on a drug deal in international waters and escaped. However he hit his head in the waters and after being washed ashore back in China, he had no memory of what transpired in between his self-exile to present day. He then met policewoman Hu Rong (Ma Sichun), and two worked together to expose Wanfeng's crimes.

== Cast ==
Actor	Character	Introduction
William Chan	Liu Ziguang (27yo)	The main protagonist who returns to Jiang Bei City after eight years of being away.
Ma Sichun	Hu Rong (25 yo)	A policewoman and adoptive daughter of the police commissioner. Her biological father is undercover in Malaysia, but goes out of contact soon after his death.
Liu Yijun	Nie Wanfeng (42 yo)	A friend of Ziguang turned drug lord who controls the vice in Jiang Bei City.
Chen Yao	Li Wan (22 yo)	The president of the Zhicheng Corporation. She becomes infatuated with Ziguang.
Ye Zuxin	Bei Xiaoshuai (24yo)	Childhood friend of Ziguang. After turning over to a new leaf away from crime, he helps Ziguang with the restaurant as well as his social life.
He Minghan	Han Jing (32yo)	The captain of Hu Rong's team and protege of Rong's biological father.
Wu Gang	Hu Yaojing (55yo)	Hu Rong's adoptive father. He is also the police commissioner and the deputy mayor of Jiang Bei City. His best friend is Hu Rong's biological father.
Wang Ji	Mei Jie (48yo)	Hotel boss and one of the major benefactors of Lisa's crime syndicate.
Li Jianyi	Master Guo (60yo)	A bicycle mechanic and father-figure of Ziguang who takes in the young man after his return.
Hu Jing	Lisa (age unknown)	A highly elusive crime lord.
Feng Guoqiang	Song Jianfeng (53yo)	The police chief.
Ren Zhengbin	Hou Sihai (45yo)	Triad boss.
Wang Fa	Zhuo Li (26yo)	The plump childhood friend of Ziguang and Xiaoshuai who helps them run Authentic Flavor as well as their other ventures.
Wang Tonghui	Li Jianguo (40yo)	A retired soldier who takes up ownership of Authentic Flavor after Ziguang's father's death. After Ziguang's return, they run the restaurant together. Jianguo proves himself to be a valuable ally to Ziguang for his fight against the crime syndicate.
Liu Ye	Ah-Se (22yo)	A devote "follower" to Ziguang who refers to him as Sect Leader. He has cognitive problems but nonetheless is loyal to Ziguang and his friends.

== Soundtrack ==
Age of Legends - Original Television Soundtrack
No.	Title	Music	Length
1.	"The Light (光)"	William Chan
2.	"Age of Legends (橙红年代)"	Emil Chau
3.	"The Hope of Love (别来无恙)"	Lei Jia
4.	"Light in Heart (心光)"	Jason Zhang
5.	"Definition of Love (幸福的定义)"	Ada Zhuang

== Reception ==
=== Ratings ===
Broadcast date	Dragon TV CSM52			Zhejiang TV CSM52		
Broadcast date	Ratings (%)	Audience share (%)	Rank	Ratings (%)	Audience share (%)	Rank
2018.9.17	0.577	2.2	4	0.269	1.03	9
2018.9.18	0.479	1.81	4	0.303	1.15	8
2018.9.19	0.497	1.93	5	0.349	1.35	6
2018.9.20	0.523	2.02	4	0.387	1.49	7
2018.9.21	0.483	1.9	3	0.344	1.36	8
2018.9.22	0.509	2.01	4	0.298	1.18	9
2018.9.23	0.565	2.12	4	0.294	1.1	9
2018.9.24	0.437	1.61	4	0.346	1.24	6
2018.9.25	0.514	1.9	5	0.316	1.17	7
2018.9.26	0.437	1.65	7	0.269	1.01	8
2018.9.27	0.484	1.84	5	0.285	1.09	8
2018.9.28	0.542	2.1	3	0.306	1.19	7
2018.9.29	0.556	2.13	3	0.4	1.54	7
2018.9.30	0.536	1.95	3	0.411	1.5	5
2018.10.1	0.504	1.94	3	0.34	1.31	6
2018.10.2	0.567	2.2	3	0.407	1.58	5
2018.10.3	0.532	2.09	4	0.345	1.36	6
2018.10.4	0.526	2.05	4	0.38	1.48	5
2018.10.5	0.615	2.27	3	0.496	1.83	5
2018.10.6	0.623	2.3	3	0.385	1.42	5
2018.10.7	0.818	2.86	3	-	-	-
2018.10.8	0.744	2.73	3	0.327	1.21	10
2018.10.9	0.693	2.57	3	0.303	1.13	10
2018.10.10	0.734	2.67	3	0.389	1.43	7
2018.10.11	0.842	3.08	3	0.375	1.38	9

- Highest ratings are marked in red, lowest ratings are marked in blue

=== Awards and nominations ===
Award	Category	Nominated work	Result	Ref.
Influence of Recreational Responsibilities Awards	TV Drama of the Year		Won	
