= A Legend =

2024 film by Stanley Tong

- Theatrical release poster

Chinese name
- Traditional Chinese: 傳說
- Simplified Chinese: 传说
Transcriptions
Standard Mandarin
- Hanyu Pinyin: Chuánshuō
Yue: Cantonese
- Jyutping: cyun4 syut3 / zyun6 syut3
- Directed by: Stanley Tong
- Written by: Stanley Tong
- Produced by: Barbie Tung; Defu Jiang; Dong Yu; Hongbo Yin
- Starring: Jackie Chan; Lay Zhang; Gülnezer; Aarif Rahman
- Cinematography: Jingle Ma
- Music by: Nathan Wang
- Production companies: Bona Film Group Services; Shanghai Lix Entertainment; China Film Distribution; Emperor Motion Pictures
- Distributed by: Emperor Motion Pictures
- Release date: 10 July 2024
- Running time: 129 minutes
- Country: China
- Language: Mandarin
- Budget: US$50 million
- Box office: US$11.2 million

A Legend (simplified Chinese: 传说; traditional Chinese: 傳說) is a 2024 Chinese action fantasy film. It was written and directed by Stanley Tong and starred Jackie Chan, Lay Zhang, Gülnezer and Aarif Rahman. It was released in China on July 10, 2024. The film is a direct standalone sequel to The Myth (2005), overlooking Kung Fu Yoga (2017).

== Plot ==
This is a story about a past life relationship, a sequel to The Myth. During an archaeological excavation, Professor Fang unearths a mysterious shamanic jade, which transports him and his assistant, Wang Jing, back to the Western Han dynasty. There, they transformed into fierce Han generals, leading cavalry across the vast Hexi grasslands in a battle against the Xiongnu to defend their homeland. Amidst the war, Professor Fang, now a warrior, crosses paths with the Xiongnu princess, Meng Yun, sparking a love story that spanned thousands of years. In search of the truth, Professor Fang, Wang Jing, and their friend Lei Zhen venture deep into an ancient glacier to uncover a long-lost sacred site, hoping to unveil the untold legend buried in time.

== Cast ==
- Jackie Chan as:
  - Professor Fang, an archeologist. Chief archeologist and specialist in Western Han and Hun history.
  - Zhao Zhan, Han Dynasty General serving under Huo Qubing. Skillful on horseback melee skills.
- Lay Zhang as:
  - Wang Jing, an assistant of Professor Fang
  - Huajun, Han Dynasty General serving under Huo Qubing. Friend of Zhao Zhan and skillful with a bow whilst on horseback.
- Gülnezer as:
  - Princess Mengyun, is good at both literature and martial arts, and her martial arts skills are unrivaled. She also practices medicine and saves lives.
- Aarif Rahman as:
  - Hubbard, a shaman expert
  - Hun Prince
- Xiao Ran Peng as:
  - Xin Ran, Wang Jing's friend and love interest. Also working under Professor Fang.
- Jerry Li as:
  - Lei Zhen
- Zheng Yecheng as:
  - Ye Cheng
- Shawn Dou as:
  - Huo Qubing, famous Western Han general and commander of the cavalry army that broke through the Hexi Corridor and wiped out the Xiongnu Confederation, expanding Han territories into Xinjiang.
- Jin Qiaoqiao as:
  - Mengyun's mother
- Bing Jia as:
  - Ice Fishing Man
- Kim Hee-sun as
  - Mysterious Woman

== Production ==
- In January 2023, the film was registered with the National Film Administration. In February 2023, the film's lead actors were first exposed in Zhaosu County, Uyghur Autonomous Prefecture, Xinjiang. In April of the same year, the film's main creative team appeared at the Beijing International Film Festival, released the first concept poster, and announced the list of leading actors. In May of the same year, the film entered the Cannes Film Festival trading market, revealing that the film's budget was 50 million US dollars. On July 28, the film was completed.
- The film's "Thousands of Horses and People" scene mobilized 1,090 herders and more than 6,000 horses to participate in the filming. AI technology was used in the film to recreate the image of Jackie Chan at the age of 27.
- On July 4, 2024, the film A Legend was roadshowed in Chengdu, where the creative team told the behind-the-scenes stories of the filming process.
- On July 9, 2024, the film was officially announced to be released on July 10, and the MV for the promotional song "Our Legend" sung by Jackie Chan was also released at the same time.

== Reception ==
Released on July 10, 2024, in China, A Legend opened at third-place, earning 6.67 million yuan (US$934,959) on its opening day. It earned a final gross of US$11,164,000 in China. The film received criticism from critics in China for its plotting, acting, and its stiff use of AI technology to de-age Jackie Chan. The film received a 5.1 out of 10 on Douban."
