= Camping Life =

Chinese reality show

- Season 1 poster
- Traditional Chinese: 一起露营吧
- Simplified Chinese: 一起露营吧
- Hanyu Pinyin: Yi qi lu ying ba
- Genre: Reality show
- Directed by: Jason Cai
- Starring: See below
- Country of origin: China
- Original language: Standard Chinese
- No. of seasons: 2
- No. of episodes: 10 (Season 1); 10 (Season 2)

Production
- Camera setup: Multicamera setup
- Production company: Jiangsu Television

Original release
- Network: iQIYI
- Release: 28 April 2022 – 25 June 2023

Camping Life (Chinese: 一起露营吧) is a Chinese reality show broadcast by iQIYI and Jiangsu Television. Season 1 was broadcast from 28 April 2022 till 30 June 2022. Season 2 was broadcast by iQIYI from 19 April 2023 till 21 June 2023 and Jiangsu Television from 23 April till 25 June 2023.

== Cast ==
=== Season 1 ===
==== Camping Family ====
- William Chan (episodes 1–10)
- Yang Di (episodes 1–10)
- Huang Yali (episodes 1–10)
- Wang Ziyi (episodes 1–10)
- Zhang Ruonan (episodes 1–4, 9–10)
- Zhong Chuxi (episodes 5–10)

==== Camping Guests ====
- Zhu Yunfeng (episodes 1–2)
- Roy Wang (episodes 3–4)
- Tang Jiuzhou (episodes 7–8)
- Jeffrey Tung (episodes 9–10)
- Zhu Zhengting (episodes 9–10)

=== Season 2 ===
==== Camping Family ====
- William Chan (episodes 1-10)
- Yang Di (episodes 1-10)
- Wei Daxun (episodes 1-10)
- Zhang Yanqi (episodes 1-10)
- Yin Zheng (episodes 1-4)
- Wang Linkai (episodes 5-10)

==== Camping Guests ====
- Song Yuqi (episodes 1–2)
- Zhou Jieqiong (episodes 1–2)
- Hu Lan (episodes 3–4)
- Xu Zhisheng (episodes 3–4)
- Yang Li (episodes 3-4)
- Tenzing Tsondu (episodes 5-6)
- Chen Zhuoxuan (episodes 5-6)
- Zhang Yifan (episodes 5-6)
- Wu Xin (episodes 7-8)
- Wang Mian (episodes 7-8)
- Li Jiage (episodes 7-8)
- Lin Gengxin (episodes 9-10)
- Zhang Lixin (episodes 10)
- Zhang Yuan (episodes 10)
