= As the Light Goes Out =

2014 Hong Kong film by Derek Kwok

- Hong Kong poster
- Directed by: Derek Kwok
- Written by: Derek Kwok; Jill Leung; Philip Yung
- Produced by: Albert Lee; David Chan; Zhao Jun
- Starring: Nicholas Tse; Shawn Yue; Simon Yam; Hu Jun
- Cinematography: Jason Kwan
- Edited by: Wong Hoi; Matthew Hui
- Music by: Teddy Robin; Tommy Wai
- Production companies: Emperor Motion Pictures; Media Asia Films; Zhujiang Film Group
- Distributed by: Emperor Motion Pictures; Huaxia Film Distribution
- Release dates: January 2, 2014 (Hong Kong); January 3, 2014 (China)
- Running time: 116 minutes
- Countries: Hong Kong; China
- Languages: Cantonese; Mandarin; English
- Box office: US$15,973,348

As the Light Goes Out (Chinese: 救火英雄) is a 2014 Hong Kong-Chinese disaster film directed by Derek Kwok and starring Nicholas Tse, Shawn Yue, Simon Yam and Hu Jun.

== Cast ==
- Nicholas Tse as Fire Senior Station Officer, Sam Ho Wing-sam (何永森)
- Shawn Yue as Fire Station Officer, Yau Pong-chiu (游邦潮)
- Simon Yam as Chief Fireman, Lee Pui-to (李培道)
- Hu Jun as China fireman who migrate to Hong Kong and becomes Fireman, Hai Yang (海洋)
- Michelle Bai as Yang Lin (楊琳), Power Plant Safety Officer
- William Chan as rookie fireman, Cheung Man-kin (張文健)
- Andy On as Assistant District Officer, Yip Chi-fai (葉志輝)
- Patrick Tam as Mr. Man (萬先生), Hong Kong Power Plant Operation Manager
- Liu Kai-chi as Tam Sir (譚Sir), assistant director of Fire Services
- Deep Ng as Ben Sir (斌Sir), Station Officer
- Michelle Wai as Power plant employee
- Kenny Kwan as Siu-kiu (小僑)
- Alice Li as Emily, Sam Ho Wing-sam's wife
- Jackie Chan as himself (cameo)
- Andrew Lau as Director of Fire Services (cameo)
- Siu Yam-yam as Wife of wine brewer owner (cameo)

== Release ==
As the Light Goes Out was released in Hong Kong on January 2, 2014, and in China on January 3, 2014. At the end of the run, the film has grossed $11.92 million in China.

== Reception ==
Derek Elley of Film Business Asia gave the film a six out of ten rating, stating that the film "lacks human drama and real scope" and that "isn't especially bad as a genre movie, it's also not especially good, and is certainly no threat to Johnnie To's Lifeline (1997) as the premier Hong Kong firefighting film."

== Awards and nominations ==
Award	Category	Nominee	Result	Ref.
33rd Hong Kong Film Awards	Best Director	Derek Kwok	Nominated	-
33rd Hong Kong Film Awards	Best Cinematography	Jason Kwan	Nominated	-
33rd Hong Kong Film Awards	Best Editing	Wong Hoi and Matthew Hui	Nominated	-
33rd Hong Kong Film Awards	Best Art Direction	Eric Lam	Nominated	-
33rd Hong Kong Film Awards	Best Sound Design	Phyllis Cheng	Nominated	-
33rd Hong Kong Film Awards	Best Visual Effects	Henri Wong, Hugo Kwan and Walter Wong	Nominated	-
33rd Hong Kong Film Awards	Best Original Film Score	Teddy Robin and Tomy Wai	Nominated	-
33rd Hong Kong Film Awards	Best Original Film Song	Nicholas Tse, Qiao Xing, Kit and Phat	Nominated	-
5th Macau International Film Festival	Best Supporting Actor	William Chan	Won	
51st Golden Horse Film Festival and Awards	Best Visual Effects	Henri Wong, Hugo Kwan and Walter Wong	Nominated	-
51st Golden Horse Film Festival and Awards	Best Action Choreography	Wong Wai Leong	Won	-
