= Only Side by Side with You =

- Genre: Romance; Drama
- Based on: Nan Fang You Qiao Mu by Xiao Hu Ru Wei
- Written by: Qiao Bingqing; Zhang Aimin; Li Wenting
- Directed by: Lin Yan
- Starring: William Chan; Bai Baihe
- Country of origin: China
- Original language: Mandarin
- No. of seasons: 1
- No. of episodes: 40

Production
- Production location: Shanghai
- Production companies: Linmon Pictures; Changjiang Culture

Original release
- Network: Zhejiang TV; Jiangsu TV
- Release: March 25 – April 15, 2018

Only Side by Side with You (Chinese: 南方有乔木; pinyin: Nan Fang You Qiao Mu) is a 2018 Chinese television series based on the novel of the same name by Xiao Hu Ru Wei (小狐濡尾). It stars William Chan and Bai Baihe. The series premiered on Jiangsu TV and Zhejiang TV on March 25, 2018.

== Synopsis ==
The series tells the story of Shi Yue, an ex-special force member, but now the mysterious owner of a bar, who butts heads with Nan Qiao when she goes to his bar to meet potential investors after falling out with her cheating fiancée. Shi Yue discovers that Nan Qiao seems to be someone related to his past, so he purposely gets close to her to find out more, ultimately falling for her in the process.

== Cast ==
| Actor | Character | Introduction |
|---|---|---|
| William Chan | Shi Yue | Owner of a bar, who used to be a member of the Blue Sky Special Forces. |
| Bai Baihe | Nan Qiao | A drones designer, owner of Ji Ke Company. |
| Li Xian | Chang Jianxiong | Shi Yue's ex-comrade in the Special Forces, and Nan Qiao's childhood friend. He has an unrequited love for Nan Qiao. |
| Qin Hailu | An Ning | A woman related to Shi Yue's past who had an extreme influence on him. |
| Michelle Bai | Wen Di | Manager of Ji Ke Company, Nan Qiao's business partner. |
| Zhang Youhao | Hao Jie | An IT expert, Shi Yue's close friend. |
| Wang Ruoshan | Ouyang Qi | A Veterinary physician. Nan Qiao's close friend. |
| Cao Lu | Qie Hao | Manager of Lucid Dream bar, Shi Yue's good friend. |
| Du Zhiguo | Nan Hongzhou | Nan Qiao's father. |
| Zheng Xiaoning | Chang Aiguo | Chang Jianxiong's father. |
| Wang Weiwei | Nan Qin | Nan Qiao's sister. |
| Tie Zheng | Nan Si | Nan Qiao's brother. |
| Huang Tianqi | Zheng Hao | Nan Qiao's nephew. |
| Zhang Yixin | Xiao An | Employee of Ji Ke Company. |
| Zhou Ran | Qin Shiyu | Employee of Ji Ke Company. |
| Huang Yilin | Xia Qing | Employee of Ji Ke Company. |
| Zhang Weiwei | Brother Q | Employee of Ji Ke Company. |
| Ma Liang | Zhou Ran | Nan Qiao's ex-fiance. |
| Zhang Zilun | Brother Tai | Shi Yue's enemy. |

== Production ==
=== Filming ===
The series started filming in March 2017 at Shanghai and wrapped up in July 2017, taking a total of 113 days. About 400 quadcopters were employed for filming the set of the series.

== Soundtrack ==
Only Side by Side with You – Original Television Soundtrack
| No. | Title | Music | Length |
|---|---|---|---|
| 1. | "Lucid Dream (清醒梦境)" (Theme song) | William Chan | 4:16 |
| 2. | "Microscopic view of the world (微观世界)" (Opening theme song) | He Jie / Victor Ma |
| 3. | "Is there a relationship like this (有没有这样一种关系)" | Jin Chi |
| 4. | "Two difficulties (两难)" | Silence Wang |
| 5. | "One Two Three ( 一二三)" | Juno Su |
| 6. | "No One Knows" | Silence Wang |

== Ratings ==
- In the table below, the blue numbers represent the lowest ratings and the red numbers represent the highest ratings.

| Episode # | Original broadcast date | CSM52 Jiangsu TV (%) | | | CSM52 Zhejiang TV (%) | | |
| Episode # | Original broadcast date | Ratings | Audience share | Ranking | Ratings | Audience share | Ranking |
|---|---|---|---|---|---|---|---|
| 1–2 | March 25, 2018 | 0.567 | 1.994 | 6 | 0.348 | 1.224 | 9 |
| 3–4 | March 26, 2018 | 0.403 | 1.446 | 10 | 0.401 | 1.44 | 11 |
| 5–6 | March 27, 2018 | 0.447 | 1.613 | 10 | 0.487 | 1.756 | 9 |
| 7–8 | March 28, 2018 | 0.615 | 2.195 | 6 | 0.418 | 1.503 | 11 |
| 9–10 | March 29, 2018 | 0.564 | 2.042 | 8 | 0.491 | 1.774 | 9 |
| 11–12 | March 30, 2018 | 0.692 | 2.43 | 4 | 0.493 | 1.76 | 6 |
| 13 | March 31, 2018 | 0.494 | 1.81 | 5 | 0.384 | 1.43 | 7 |
| 14–15 | April 1, 2018 | 0.631 | 2.198 | 4 | 0.532 | 1.85 | 6 |
| 16–17 | April 2, 2018 | 0.571 | 2.08 | 5 | 0.556 | 2.021 | 6 |
| 18 | April 3, 2018 | 0.426 | 1.544 | 7 | 0.453 | 1.65 | 6 |
| 19–20 | April 4, 2018 | 0.521 | 1.766 | 8 | 0.49 | 1.654 | 9 |
| 21–22 | April 5, 2018 | 0.499 | 1.652 | 7 | 0.481 | 1.592 | 8 |
| 23–24 | April 6, 2018 | 0.423 | 1.406 | 8 | 0.554 | 1.866 | 5 |
| 25 | April 7, 2018 | 0.411 | 1.465 | 8 | 0.433 | 1.529 | 7 |
| 26–27 | April 8, 2018 | 0.46 | 1.63 | 7 | 0.495 | 1.75 | 6 |
| 28–29 | April 9, 2018 | 0.439 | 1.607 | 8 | 0.441 | 1.614 | 7 |
| 30–31 | April 10, 2018 | 0.456 | 1.648 | 9 | 0.491 | 1.792 | 8 |
| 32–33 | April 11, 2018 | 0.476 | 1.709 | 8 | 0.542 | 1.963 | 6 |
| 34–35 | April 12, 2018 | 0.445 | 1.603 | 7 | 0.54 | 1.966 | 6 |
| 36–37 | April 13, 2018 | 0.505 | 1.69 | 4 | N.A. | N.A. | N.A. |
| 38 | April 14, 2018 | 0.392 | 1.38 | 6 | 0.457 | 1.61 | 5 |
| 39–40 | April 15, 2018 | 0.443 | 1.558 | 5 | 0.428 | 1.501 | 6 |

== Awards and nominations ==
| Award | Category | Nominated work | Result | Ref. |
|---|---|---|---|---|
| 24th Huading Awards | Best Actor (Modern Drama) | William Chan | Nominated | |
| 中国电视媒体综合实力大型调研 | Outstanding Drama of the Year | | Won | |

== International Broadcast ==
- Malaysia – Astro Shuang Xing (CH307 HD / CH324) – From 26 March 2018, Mondays to Fridays, 6 PM.
