= Song Yanfei =

Chinese actress

- 宋妍霏
- Born: Song Yanfei; 22 October 1995 (age 30); Australia
- Other names: Cecilia Boey; CC
- Education: Shanghai Theatre Academy
- Occupations: Actress; singer; dancer
- Years active: 2015–present
- Agent(s): JYP , Zhejiang Huace Film & TV
- Musical career
- Genres: Mandopop
- Instrument: Vocals
- Years active: 2015–present

Song Yanfei
- Chinese: 宋妍霏
Transcriptions
Standard Mandarin
- Hanyu Pinyin: Sòng Yánfēi

Song Yan-fei (Chinese: 宋妍霏; born October 22, 1995), also known as Cecilia Boey (Chinese: 梅允中; Pe̍h-ōe-jī: Bôe Ún-tiong), is a Chinese actress, singer and dancer. Song gained fame after joining Grade One Freshman and her roles in I'm Sorry It's not You (2017), Mr. Right (2018) and Walk Into Your Memory (2019).

== Early life ==
Song was born on 22 October 1995 in Australia, and moved to Shanghai with her family when she was four years old. She attended Shanghai Theatre Academy.

== Career ==
=== Pre-debut ===
Song was discovered by a South Korean talent scout when she was 15 and trained under JYP Entertainment from 2011 to 2014. She was supposed to debut with a girl group called 6MIX (later Twice), but Song suffered a serious knee injury and decided to leave the entertainment company. She went back to China to pursue a career in acting.

=== 2015–present: Acting debut in China ===
Song returned to China and joined the cast of Grade One Freshman in 2015. Song made her large screen debut in The New Year's Eve of Old Lee (2016) playing the role as Lily. She was also cast in the television series Topple Your Ex-Girlfriend (2016), and I'm Sorry It's not You (2017) Where The Lost Ones Go (2017) it her debut project. She had her first lead role Mr. Right and a cameo in Detective Chinatown 2. Her rising popularity led her to several main roles, iQiyi's Hero Dog 3, Tencent Video's Walk Into Your Memory and Ten Years Late in 2019.

She was cast in the LeTV romance drama Braveness of the Ming and Jade Lovers, both set to air in 2020.

== Filmography ==
=== Film ===
Year	English title	Original title	Role	Ref.
2016	The New Year's Eve of Old Lee	过年好	Lily	
2018	Detective Chinatown 2	唐人街探案 2	Ya Tou	

=== Television series ===
Year	English title	Original title	Role	Network	Ref.
2016	Topple Your Ex-Girlfriend	整垮前女友	Su Damei	LeTV	
2017	I'm Sorry It's not You	可惜不是你	Ye Zi	Mango TV	
2018	Mr. Right	恋爱先生	Qiao Yilin	Dragon TV, Jiangsu TV	
2019	Hero Dog 3	神犬小七3	An Xin	iQiyi	
2019	Walk Into Your Memory	走进你的记忆	An Ning	Tencent Video	
2019	Ten Years Late	十年三月三十日	Shen Shuangshuang	iQiyi	
2020	Cross Fire	穿越火线	An Lan	Tencent	
2021	The Dance of the Storm	风暴舞	Chen Jingwen	iQiyi, Youku, Tencent	
2022	The Silence of the Monster	孤独的野兽	Xia Shi	iQiyi	
2023	Exploration Method of Love	爱的勘探法	Su Ji Shi / Su Jin	Mango TV	
2023	Wenderella's Diary	温德瑞拉日记	Wen Rou	Youku	
2023	The Trust	恩爱两不疑	Xu Yu	iQiyi, Mango TV	
TBA	Braveness of the Ming	錦衣夜行	Xu Minger	LeTV	
TBA	Jade Lovers	翡翠恋人	Chu Xue	Youku	

=== Television shows ===
Year	English title	Original title	Network	Notes	Ref.
2015	Grade One Freshman	一年级·大学季	Hunan Television	Cast member	
2020	720 Trend Manager	720潮流主理人	Youku	Cast member	
2020-2021	I Am the Actor Season 3	我就是演员3	Zhejiang Television	Contestant	
2021	Mr. Housework 3	做家务的男人 第3季	iQiyi	Cast member	
2021-2022	Wow! Nice Figure 3	哎呀好身材3海浪季	Mango TV	Cast member	
