= Jeffrey Ngai =

Hong Kong actor and singer (born 1998)

- 魏浚笙
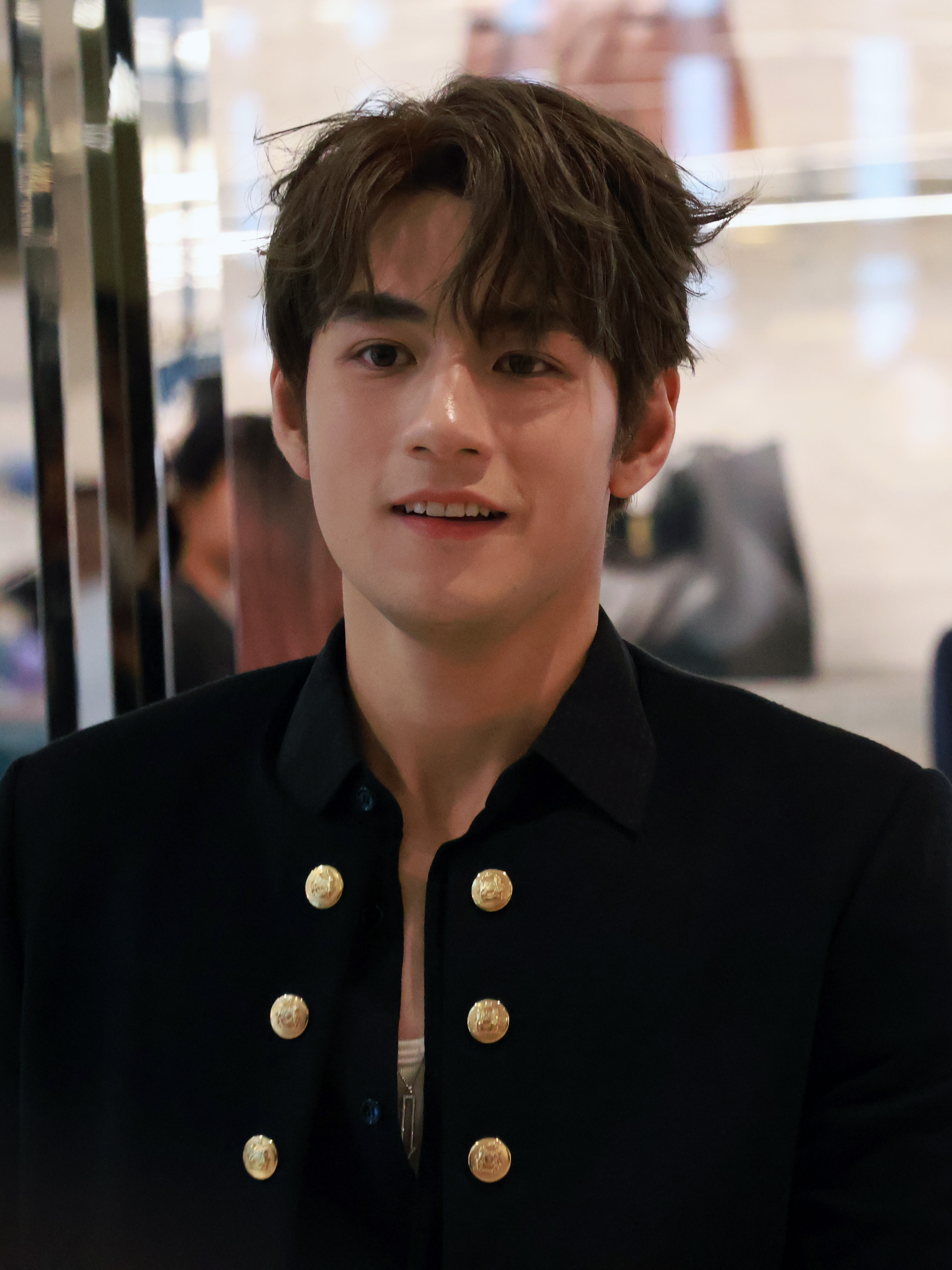
- Ngai in 2023
- Born: 23 April 1998 (age 28); Hong Kong
- Occupations: Model; actor; singer
- Years active: 2020–present
- Musical career
- Genres: Cantopop
- Years active: 2022–present
- Label: BTBAS Entertainment

Chinese name
- Traditional Chinese: 魏浚笙
Transcriptions
Yue: Cantonese
- Jyutping: ngai^{6} zeon^{3} sang^{1}
- IPA: [ŋɐj˨ tsɵn˧ sɐŋ˥]

Jeffrey Ngai Tsun-sang (Chinese: 魏浚笙; born 23 April 1998), is a Hong Kong fashion model, actor and singer. He is known for appearing on ViuTV's Variety Show Be a Better Man, Be On Game and Drama I Swim. He released his first solo song "The First Fan" (第一個迷) on 29 December 2022 and got #1 on YouTube HK Trending.

== Early life ==
Ngai is of mixed heritage with Indonesian and Dutch ancestry. He was a student at Yaumati Catholic Primary School and Helen Liang Memorial Secondary School (Shatin). He later studied business administration at Hong Kong Metropolitan University.

== Discography ==
=== Singles ===
- "The First Fan" (第一個迷) (2022)
- "Are We Still Together?" (2023)
- "Before Sunset" (失約巴黎) (2023)
- "Never Say Never" (2023)
- "My Own World Map" (我的世界地圖) (2023)
- "The Furniture" (傢俬) (2024)
- "Old Jeff" (老積) (2024)
- "The Solitary Gourmet" (孤獨美食家) (2025)
- "My Head!" (2025)
- "White Tuxedo" (白色踢死兔) (2025)
- "Heart of Gold" (一生懸命) (2025)

=== Collaborations ===
Title	Year	Album	Artists	Notes/Ref.
"To Our Dreams" (致我們的夢想)"	2023	Dream	Sammi Cheng feat. Jeffrey Ngai	
"I Feel It" (我感覺到)"	2024		Jeffrey Ngai, Kaho Hung	

== Filmography ==
=== Film ===
Year	Title	Role	Notes	Ref.
2018	Big Brother	—N/a	Background actor	
2023	Everything Under Control	Penguin	Main role	
2024	Table for Six 2	Mark Gor	Main role	
2024	Inside Out 2	Embarrassment	Voice role, Cantonese version	
2024	Cesium Fallout	Sai-chu	Main role	
2025	Little Red Sweet	Kai-cheong	Main role	
2025	Road to Vendetta	Assassin No.4	Main role	

=== Drama ===
Year	Title	Role	Network	Note
2022	In Geek We Trust	Jayden	ViuTV	Supporting role
2022	I Swim	Yu Long Chung	ViuTV	Main role
2022	Million Dollar Family	Lee Hei Yin	ViuTV	Main role
2025	The First Frost	Ah Sen	Youku, Netflix	Guest role

=== Variety show ===
Year	Title	Network
2020	Be a Better Man	ViuTV
2020	Be On Game	ViuTV
2021	Be On Game CNY SP	ViuTV
2021	Be On Game Season 2	ViuTV
2022	Be On Game SSP	ViuTV
2023	Be on Game Season 3	ViuTV
2023	Where Do Do you go	HOYTV
2025	Be On Game Season 4	ViuTV

== Videography ==
=== Music videos ===
Year	Title	Artist(s)	Director(s)	Length	Notes/Ref.
2020	"Paradise"	Dusty Bottle	Kelvis Lau@Provit_HK	3:46	
2021	"Loxit"	JC		4:30	
2021	"E小姐連環不幸事件 (Miss E's Series of Unfortunate Events)"	LA Girls		4:58	
2022	"膠on! (Plastic On)"	Plastic Family 6	Albert Pang	3:46	Be On Game Season 2 Theme Song
2022	"第一個迷 (The First Fan)"	Jeffrey Ngai	SoKen	4:06	
2023	"Are We Still Together?"	Jeffrey Ngai	Heiward Mak	4:24	
2023	"To Our Dreams"	Sammi Cheng, Jeffrey Ngai	Bill Chia	4:04	
2023	"Before Sunset"	Jeffrey Ngai		3:47	
2023	"Never Say Never"	Jeffrey Ngai	James Leung	4:00	
2023	"My Own World Map"	Jeffrey Ngai	James Leung	3:50	
2024	"The Furniture"	Jeffrey Ngai	Blair Chan	4:09	
2024	"TXT OR CALL"	Marife Yau	Daniel Cheung	3:12	
2024	"Old Jeff"	Jeffrey Ngai	Blair Chan	4:02	

== Awards and nominations ==
Year	Award	Category	Result	Ref.
2023	Top Ten Chinese Gold Songs Award	Best Male Rookies	Gold	
