= The New Year's Eve of Old Lee =

- Film poster
- Traditional Chinese: 過年好
- Simplified Chinese: 过年好
- Hanyu Pinyin: Guòniánhǎo
- Directed by: Gao Qunshu
- Written by: Lai Jing; Luo Eryang; Wu Jiuxi
- Produced by: Gao Qunshu
- Starring: Zhao Benshan; Yan Ni; Rayza; Aaron Yan
- Cinematography: Du Jie
- Edited by: Yang Hongyu
- Music by: Ma Shangyou
- Production companies: Moya Entertainment; Rockview Pictures Entertainment; Hunan Yuandian Entertainment Co., Ltd; Beijing Tugu Media Co., Ltd; Beijing Weiying Shidai Technology Co., Ltd; Shenzhen Sunxingzhe Media Co., Ltd; Beijing Wanxiang Media&Adevertising Co,.Ltd; Zhengzhou Newspaper Group
- Distributed by: United Entertainment Partners; Beijing Weiying Shidai Technology Co., Ltd
- Release date: 1 February 2016 (China)
- Running time: 106 minutes
- Country: China
- Language: Mandarin

The New Year's Eve of Old Lee (Chinese: 过年好) is a 2016 Chinese comedy film directed and produced by Gao Qunshu and starring Zhao Benshan, Yan Ni, Rayza, and Aaron Yan. It is based on the Taiwanese drama All Night on New Year's Eve (守岁) by Li Zongxi. The film picks up the story of a family of three generations has been reunited with students for the new year. The film premiered in China on February 1, 2016.

== Plot ==
The story revolves around Old Lee (played by Zhao Benshan), a lonely retired elderly man living alone in a traditional northern courtyard house in Shimen, northeast of Beijing. Although he is in the early stages of Alzheimer's disease and occasionally experiences memory loss, Old Lee is basically able to take care of his daily life, which contrasts sharply with the chaotic lifestyle of his relatives.

Old Li only gets to see his daughter Li Yangduo (played by Yan Ni), who's working in Beijing, and his granddaughter Julie (played by Rayzha Alimjan), who's studying in the US, during holidays. He eagerly awaits their reunion, which also brings his granddaughter's boyfriend Aaron (played by Aaron Yan).

On Lunar New Year's Eve, Old Lee's daughter, Yangduo, is initially in Beijing, dealing with her own professional and relationship pressures. Her partner demands his investment back, and she is busy picking up her own daughter, Julie, who is studying in Los Angeles. After picking up Julie, Yangduo receives a distressing call from a friend stating that her father is unwell. She immediately drives to Shimen County in Hunan to care for him, much to the annoyance of Julie, who feels her own trip has been disrupted.

Finally, the three generations reunited for the first time in years. But the reunion was filled with tension and unresolved conflicts.

== Cast ==
- Zhao Benshan as Old Li, an empty nester who suffers Alzheimer's disease.
- Yan Ni as Li Yangduo, Old Li's daughter.
- Rayza as Julie, the daughter of Li Yangduo and the granddaughter of Old Li.
- Aaron Yan as Aaron, a university student, Julie's boyfriend.
- Pan Binlong
- Da Peng
- Yu Hewei as a policeman
- Lian Yiming as Zhu Heping
- Liang Jing
- Qi Xi
- Huang Xiaolei as Sun Wukong
- Zhou Dongyu
- Wen Zhang
- Zhang Yi
- Mai Hongmei
- Chen Xiaoqing
- Cecilia Boey
- Zhang Xinyi
- Yuan Hong
- Chen He
- Xiaoshenyang
- Wang Xiaoli
- Song Xiaobao
- Jing Gangshan
- Vieven Liu
- Guan Hu
- Zhang Yibai
- Zhu Hongjia
- Zhang Li
- Binzi
- Sha Yi
- Ma Jingwu
- Ma Dehua
- Zhang Yuxi
- Gao Qunshu
- Guan Zongxiang
- Hu Ming
- Li Yu
- Chen Yuanyuan
- Yu Yue
- Bai Hongbiao
- Zhou Chuchu
- Tang Jingmei
- Cao Weiyu
- Han Qing
- Liu Tianzuo
- Cui Zige
- Cheng Fangxu
- Tong Yao
- Mai Hongmei
- Chen Xiaoqing
- Yu Feihong
- Song Yanfei
- Yao Chen
- Liu Xiaoguang

== Soundtrack ==
No.	Title	Lyrics	Music	Singer(s)	Length
1.	"Bangbangda (棒棒哒)" (Opening theme)	Cui Xu/ Liu Zhuowei	Choegyuseong/ Li Haoyang	Alan Tam

== Production ==
The film was shot entirely on location in suburban Beijing.

== Release ==
The New Year's Eve of Old Lee was released on February 1, 2016 in China.
