= William Chan =

Hong Kong singer, dancer, and actor (born 1985)

- 陳偉霆
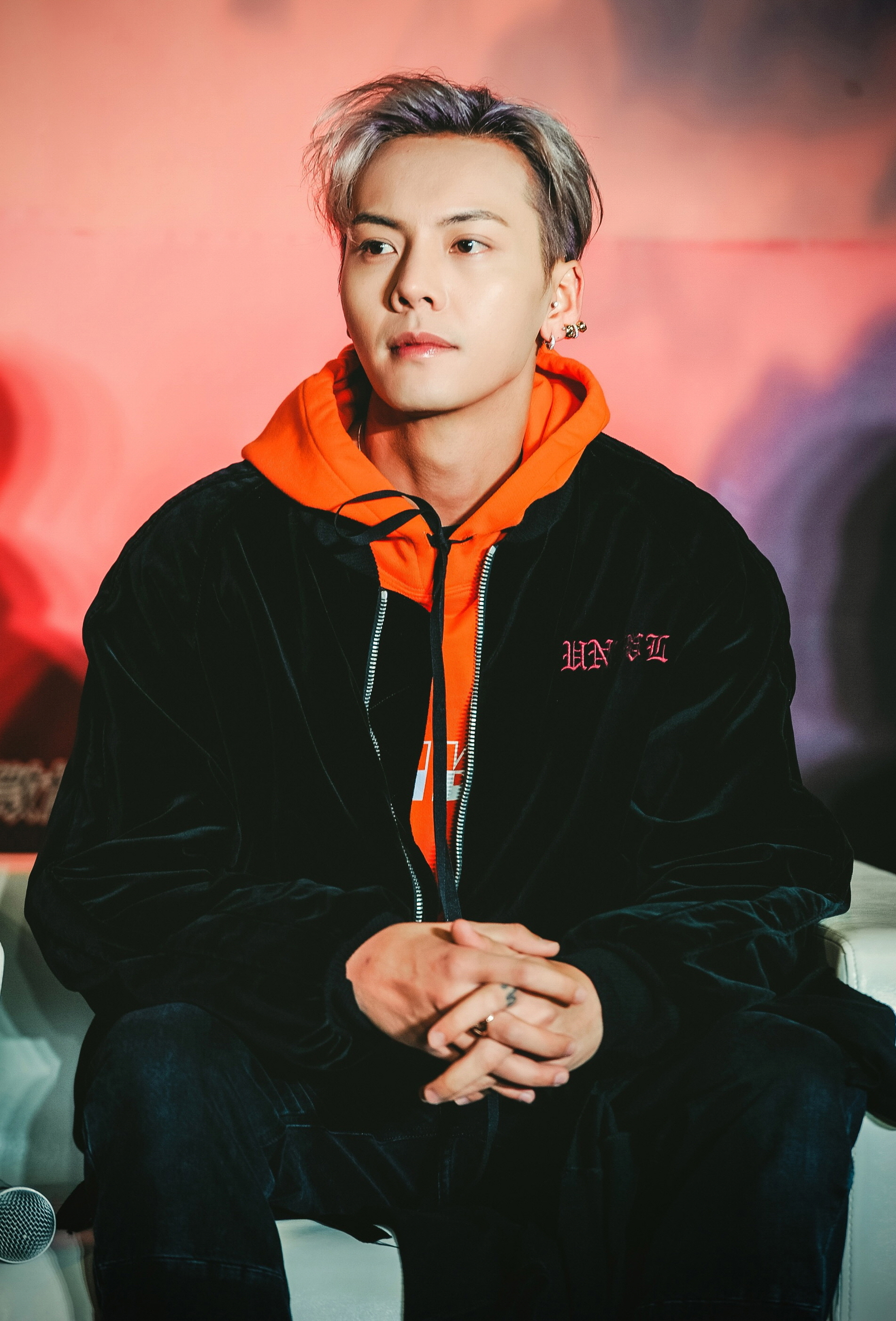
- William on Hot Blood Dance Crew in 2018
- Born: 21 November 1985 (age 40); Hong Kong
- Citizenship: Chinese (Hong Kong)
- Education: Yew Chung International School
- Occupations: Singer; dancer; actor
- Years active: 2004–present
- Partner: Sui He
- Children: 1
- Awards: RTHK Top 10 Gold Songs Awards; Best Prospect Award (Gold); 2008 (for his performance in 2008)
- Musical career
- Genres: Cantopop; Mandopop
- Instruments: Vocals; guitar; drums
- Label: Emperor Entertainment Group

Chinese name
- Traditional Chinese: 陳偉霆
- Simplified Chinese: 陈伟霆
Transcriptions
Standard Mandarin
- Hanyu Pinyin: Chén Wěitíng
Yue: Cantonese
- Yale Romanization: Chàn Wáihtìng
- Jyutping: Can4 Wai5ting4
- Hong Kong Romanisation: Chan Wai-ting

William Chan Wai-ting (born 21 November 1985) is a Hong Kong singer, dancer, and actor. In 2003, he participated in New Talent Singing Awards where he won several awards. He was then signed up by the Emperor Entertainment Group. He joined the Cantopop group Sun Boy'z in 2006 and left the group in 2008 to pursue a solo career, releasing his debut solo album in the same year. Since 2013, he has mainly pursued an acting career in mainland China, where he had a breakthrough success with the television series Swords of Legends (2014), followed by The Mystic Nine (2016), Lost Love in Times (2017), Age of Legends (2018) and Novoland: Pearl Eclipse (2021).

== Music career ==
=== 2003–2006: Debut with Sun Boy'z ===
In 2003, Chan participated in the International Chinese New Talent Singing Championship Hong Kong regional finals and won several awards. He was then signed up by the Emperor Entertainment Group (EEG) as a new talent and started appearing in TV shows as a host.

In 2006, Chan joined Sun Boy'z, a Cantopop boy group created by EEG, together with Steven Cheung and Dennis Mark and started adopting a dance-singer persona. The trio recorded three albums in 2006 and 2007, but disbanded in 2008.

=== 2008–2014: Solo career ===
After the disbandment of his group, Chan began his solo career. In September 2008, Chan released his first solo album Will Power, and won the Most Popular Male Newcomer award at the 2008 Hong Kong Jade Solid Gold Best Ten Music Awards Presentation and Most Promising Award at the RTHK Top 10 Gold Songs Awards. The following year, Chan released his second solo album Warrior. He also participated in Dragon TV's dance program Let's Shake It.

From 2010 to 2013, Chan released four more albums, namely Do You Wanna Dance (2010), Heads or Tails (2010), WOW (2011) and Pop It Up (2013).

=== 2015–present: Development in Mainland ===
In 2015, Chan released his first EP titled Waiting, which is also his first Mandarin album. Waiting was a commercial success and achieved platinum certification in sales. The same year in November, he released his self-composed single "1121".

In 2016, Chan released the single "Plan W", which topped local music charts and reached ten million downloads in 12 hours. On 27 August 2016, Chan embarked on his first solo tour Inside Me which kick-started in Beijing. It was subsequently held in the cities Shanghai, Nanjing, Chongqing and Guangzhou.

In 2018, he acted as a dance mentor in iQiyi's reality online street dance variety program Hot Blood Dance Crew, as well as a mentor in Dragon Television's talent scouting program The Next Top Bang.

In 2019, Chan featured in the hit rap song "Wild Wolf Disco".

In 2020, his second solo tour originally scheduled to kick-start in Guangzhou on 14 March 2020 was postponed due to the global COVID-19 pandemic.

== Acting career ==
=== 2009–2013: Beginnings in Hong Kong ===
In 2009, Chan made his big screen debut in crime thriller Overheard. He was cast in his first lead role in Hi, Fidelity (2011), which was showcased at the 35th Hong Kong International Film Festival.

Chan then starred in the Hong Kong-Chinese film As the Light Goes Out (2013), which won him the Best Supporting Actor award at the Macau International Movie Festival for his performance.

=== 2014–2015: Breakthrough in Mainland ===
In 2013, Chan began to shift his career focus to mainland China. He filmed his first Chinese drama, The Four, an adaptation of Woon Swee Oan's novel Si Da Ming Bu. The drama was aired on Hunan TV in 2015.

Subsequently, he starred in the fantasy action drama Swords of Legends. It was a huge success and topped viewership ratings and online views in China. The popularity of Swords of Legends shot Chan to fame in China, and he won the Most Popular All-Around Artist and Media's Most Anticipated Actor awards at the 6th China TV Drama Awards. The same year, Chan starred in the comedy film Golden Brother and won the Best Young Actor award at the China Image Film Festival for his performance.

Chan then starred in his first period drama, Legend of Fragrance alongside his Swords of Legends co-star Li Yifeng. The same year, he took on his first small-screen leading role in the fantasy wuxia drama Legend of Zu Mountain.

=== 2016–present: Mainstream popularity ===
In 2016, Chan starred in the tomb-raiding drama The Mystic Nine, which serves as a prequel to the popular web drama The Lost Tomb by Nanpai Sanshu. The Mystic Nine achieved success, placing first in television ratings and setting a record for the most online views garnered in a day, and has accumulated over 10 billion views. Chan gained a surge in popularity for his role as Fo Ye, and was named the "Person of the Year" at the iQiyi All-Star Carnival. The same year, he starred alongside Jessica Jung in the romantic comedy film I Love That Crazy Little Thing and featured in Guo Jingming's fantasy blockbuster L.O.R.D: Legend of Ravaging Dynasties.

In 2017, Chan starred in the historical fantasy drama Lost Love in Times.

In 2018, Chan headlined the war epic film Genghis Khan, as well as modern romance drama Only Side by Side with You and crime action drama Age of Legends He also starred as a supporting role in the war film Air Strike.

In 2019, Chan starred in the romance film Adoring.

In 2020, the second part of Guo Jingming's fantasy blockbuster L.O.R.D: Legend of Ravaging Dynasties 2 was released via on-line streaming.

In 2021, Chan starred as the main antagonist in fantasy film The Yinyang Master, as well as the main protagonist in cyber security action drama The Dance of the Storm and historical fantasy drama Novoland: Pearl Eclipse.

In 2023, he starred in film Faces in the Crowd, fire fighting drama A Date with the Future and film Bursting Point. In 2024 and 2025, he starred in dramas See Her Again and Love's Ambition.

In 2026, he reclaimed his role as Zhang Qishan in The Mystic Nine II. His upcoming work includes drama Love Kills You Slowly.

== Other activities ==
In 2016, Chan was appointed as the first Chinese ambassador of the NFL China.

In 2017, his wax figure dressed up as his role in The Mystic Nine was added to Madame Tussauds Shanghai. In 2018, a second wax figurine dressed in his concert attire was added to Madame Tussauds Beijing.

In 2018, Chan's fashion brand Chanism collaborated with other companies (New Era, Reebok, UCCA, Aftermaths) to produce his own brand of caps, shoes, T-shirts and skiing attire.

In 2020, he was a mentor in comedian talent scouting show Gagman and starred in reality sales-marketing series "Fourtry Season 2". He also established his own fashion brand CANOTWAIT_, which partnered with luxury car brand Maserati to release a limited edition sedan in 2021.

In 2022, he took part as a regular in outdoor camping variety show Camping Life, followed by Camping Life Season 2 in 2023.

In 2023, he took part as a regular in reality variety shows Run for Time Season 3 and Fairy Tale - Welcome to Star Village.

== Personal life ==
Chan is the youngest of 3 children, he has an elder brother and elder sister. On 18 October 2025, he announced the birth of his son with model Sui He.

== Discography ==
=== Albums ===
Year	English title	Chinese title
2008	Will Power	
2009	War-ri-or	戰士
2010	Do You Wanna Dance	
2010	Heads or Tails	
2011	WOW	
2012	Pop It Up	
2015	Waiting (EP)	等等

=== Singles ===
Year	English title	Chinese title	Notes/Ref.
2010	"What Is The Trend"	什麼是潮流	with Gillian Chung; Mandarin version called "In The Scene"
2015	"1121"		
2016	"Confession"	表白	
2016	"W Project"	W 企划	
2017	"Fascinated"	着迷	
2019	"My Lady"		
2019	"Wild Wolf Disco"	野狼disco	with Gem Dong Baoshi
2020	"Climbing the Wall"	爬墙	
2021	"Dear Future Lover"	-	
2021	"Convoy"	护航	
2022	"Blooming Years"	盛开的年华	
2026	"Enjoying It"	乐此不疲	

=== Soundtracks and promotional songs ===
Year	English title	Chinese title	Album	Notes
2012	"Return What You Borrowed"	有借有还	Triad OST; Waiting	
2013	"The Brave"	勇者	As the Light Goes Out OST	with Nicholas Tse & Hong Zhuoli
2014	"Peers"	两同行	Swords of Legends OST	
2015	"Waiting Silently"	无言守候	The Four OST	
2015	"Sweet Aftertaste"	回甘	Chef Nic Season 2 theme song	with Nicholas Tse & Yu Quan
2016	"I Really Want to Hug You"	好想抱着你	The Love of Happiness OST	
2016	"My Clan"	我门	The Mystic Nine OST	
2016	"Love! Love! Aloha"		I Love That Crazy Little Thing OST	with Jessica Jung
2016	"Run For More"	酷跑	Tian Tian Ku Pao theme song	
2016	"Perfect Day"	完美這一天	Cook Up a Storm OST	with Nicholas Tse, Leo Ku, Joey Yung, Twins, Raymond Lam & Hacken Lee
2017	"Because of You"	因你	Lost Love in Times OST	
2018	"Dazzling Dance"	炫舞	QQ Dazzling Dance mobile game theme song	
2018	"Lucid Dream"	清醒梦境	Only Side by Side with You OST	
2018	"A Stroke of Jianghu"	一笔江湖	Hot Blood Dance Crew promotional song	
2018	"The Light"	光	Age of Legends OST	
2019	"A Whole New World"	新的世界	Aladdin OST (Mandarin version)	with Zhang Bichen
2019	"Adoring"	宠爱	Adoring OST	with Leo Wu, Zhang Zifeng, Wallace Chung, Yang Zishan, Zhong Chuxi, Tan Jianci, Kan Qingzi, Guo Qilin, Li Landi
2019	"Happy New Year"	新年快乐	Adoring OST	
2021	"Promise"	侍约	The Yinyang Master OST	
2021	"A Flame in Winter"	冬天里的一把火	Master Kong iced tea promotional song	with Meng Meiqi and Nawu Kere
2021	"Leave like the Wind"	像风一样离开	The Dance of the Storm OST	
2021	"Together for a Shared Future"	一起向未来	2022 Winter Olympics promotional song	with Tia Ray
2022	"We will be better"	我们会更好	25th anniversary Hong Kong handover celebration theme song	with Joey Yung (Cantonese version) with Joey Yung, Sun Nan, Tan Weiwei (Mandarin version)
2023	"Storm"	暴风	Faces in the Crowd OST	
2023	"Real Men"	大丈夫	Bursting Point OST	with Nick Cheung
2026	"Game for it"	奉陪	The Mystic Nine II OST	
2026	"Not afraid of us"	哪怕我们	The Mystic Nine II promotional song	

=== Others ===
Year	English title	Chinese title	Notes	Ref.
2017	"Love You For A Million Years"	爱你一万年	Performance for CCTV New Year's Gala	
2018	"The Best Stage"	最好的舞台	Performance for CCTV New Year's Gala	
2019	"I Strive in Happiness"	我奋斗我幸福	Performance for CCTV New Year's Gala	
2019	"A Youthful Asia "	青春亚洲	Performance for CCTV Asia Cultural Gala	
2020	"New Year Disco"	过年迪斯科	Performance for CCTV New Year's Gala	
2020	"Protect"	守护	Performance for CCTV National Day Gala	-
2021	"Auspicious"	吉祥高照	Performance for CCTV New Year's Gala	
2021	"Youth"	少年	Performance for CCTV National Day Gala	-
2022	"Happy and Prosperous Year"	歡樂吉祥年	Performance for CCTV New Year's Gala	
2022	"China Fate"	中国缘	Performance for CCTV Youth Day Gala	-
2022	"Thousand Years of Peace"	千年永宁	Performance for CCTV New Year Countdown	-
2023	"Landscape of the Country"	国色山河	Performance for CCTV Youth Festival Concert	-
2024	"Dream Rivers"	梦里的珠江缓缓地流	Performance for Hundred Flowers Spring Concert	-
2024	"Hey Youth"	嘿 少年	Performance for CCTV New Year's Gala	-

== Filmography ==
=== Film ===
Year	English title	Chinese title	Role	Notes/Ref.
2007	Sparkling Red Star	闪闪的红星		
2009	Overheard	竊聽風雲	Zu	
2009	Trick or Cheat	爱出猫	Xue Junhui	
2009	Split Second Murders	死神傻了	Ke Le	
2009	Seven 2 One	關人7事	Chan	
2010	Beauty on Duty	美麗密令	Qin Lang	
2010	Ex	前度	Chen Yunping	
2010	All About Love	得閒炒飯	Mike	
2010	Lover's Discourse	恋人絮语	Ah Bao (young)	
2011	Hi, Fidelity	出轨的女人	Bill / Ben	
2012	Triad	紮職	Ah Ting	
2013	Hardcore Comedy	重口味毒菇求爱	Ah Jie	
2014	As the Light Goes Out	救火英雄	Zhang Wenjian	
2014	Golden Brother	男人唔可以窮	Xue Keyong	
2015	Lost in Wrestling	五行攻略	Ruo Nan	
2016	I Love That Crazy Little Thing	那件疯狂的小事叫爱情	Jiang Yang	
2016	L.O.R.D: Legend of Ravaging Dynasties	爵迹	Nether	
2017	The Founding of an Army	建军大业	Triad boss (Cameo)	
2017	While There's Still Time	日落之前，喝一杯		Vogue film
2018	Genghis Khan	战神纪	Temüjin	
2018	Air Strike	大轰炸	Cheng Ting	
2018	Extinguished	熄灭		Short film
2019	Adoring	宠爱	Zhao Le	
2020	L.O.R.D: Legend of Ravaging Dynasties 2	爵迹 2 : 冷血狂宴	Nether	
2021	The Yinyang Master	侍神令	Ci Mu	
2023	Faces in the Crowd	暴风	Chen Jiadong	
2023	Bursting Point	爆裂點	Jiang Ming	
TBA	Infinite Missions	無限任務		

=== Drama series ===
Year	English title	Chinese title	Role	Notes/Ref.
2014	Swords of Legends	古剑奇谭	Ling Yue	
2015	Legend of Fragrance	活色生香	An Yichen / Wen Shiqing	
2015	The Four	少年四大名捕	Zhui Ming	
2015	Legend of Zu Mountain	蜀山战纪之剑侠传奇	Ding Dali / Ding Yin	
2016	Edge of Happiness	缘来幸福	He Han	
2016	The Love of Happiness	因为爱情有幸福	Su Kaiwen	
2016	The Mystic Nine	老九门	Zhang Qishan / Foye	
2017	Lost Love in Times	醉玲瓏	Yuan Ling	
2018	Only Side by Side with You	南方有乔木	Shi Yue	
2018	Age of Legends	橙红年代	Liu Ziguang	
2021	The Dance of the Storm	风暴舞	Li Junjie	
2021	Novoland: Pearl Eclipse	斛珠夫人	Fang Zhu / Fang Jianming	
2023	A Date with the Future	照亮你	Jin Shichuan	
2024	See Her Again	太阳星辰	Yeung Kwong-yiu	
2025	Love's Ambition	许我耀眼	Shen Haoming	
2026	Mystic Nine	九门	Zhang Qishan / Foye	
TBA	Love Kills Slowly	爱情慢慢	Wang Zhicheng	

=== Variety show ===
Year	English title	Chinese title	Notes/Ref.
2003	Disney Happy Saturday	迪斯尼开心星期六	
2004–2006	Viva Club Disney	香港迪士尼乐园	
2009	TVB Children's Day	大咕窿	
2010–2011	Big Boys Club	兄弟帮	
2015	Chef Nic Season 2	十二道锋味II	
2018	Hot Blood Dance Crew	热血街舞团	
2018–2019	The Next Top Bang	中国梦之声·下一站传奇	
2019	Chase Me	追我吧	
2020	Gagman	认真的嘎嘎们	
2020-2021	Fourtry Season 2	潮流合伙人2	
2022	Camping Life	一起露营吧	
2023	Camping Life Season 2	一起露营吧 2	
2023	Run for Time Season 3	全员加速中 3	
2023	Fairy Tale - Welcome to Star Village	童话之欢迎来到星守村	
2025	Natural High Season 3	现在就出发	

== Awards and nominations ==
=== Film and television ===
Year	Award	Category	Nominated work	Result	Ref.
2013	5th Macau International Movie Festival	Best Supporting Actor	As the Light Goes Out	Won	
2014	6th China Image Film Festival	Best Young Actor	Golden Brother	Won	
2014	6th Macau International Movie Festival	Best Supporting Actor	Golden Brother	Nominated	
2014	6th China TV Drama Awards	Most Anticipated Actor by the Media	Swords of Legends	Won	
2014	6th China TV Drama Awards	Most Popular All-Rounded Artist	Swords of Legends	Won	
2014	3rd iQiyi All-Star Carnival	Most Popular Actor	—N/a	Won	
2015	21st Shanghai Television Festival	Best Supporting Actor	Swords of Legends	Nominated	
2015	17th Huading Awards	Best Newcomer	Swords of Legends	Nominated	
2015	4th iQiyi All-Star Carnival	Most Popular Idol	—N/a	Won	
2016	5th iQiyi All-Star Carnival	Person of the Year	The Mystic Nine	Won	
2018	24th Huading Awards	Best Actor (Modern Drama)	Only Side by Side with You	Nominated	
2019	GQ 2019 Men of the Year	Goodwill Ambassador	—N/a	Won	
2020	8th Vancouver Chinese Film Festival	Most Popular Actor	Adoring	Won	
2021	13th Macau International Movie Festival	Best Supporting Actor	The Yinyang Master	Nominated	
2023	4th New Era International Film Festival	Best Action Actor	Faces in the Crowd	Nominated	
2025	30th Asian Television Awards	Best Actor in a Leading Role	See Her Again	Nominated	

=== Music ===
Year	Award	Category	Nominated work	Result	Ref.
2008	Metro Radio Mandarin Hits Music Awards Presentation	New Artist Award	—N/a	Won	
2008	Yahoo！Asia Buzz Awards	New Forces Award	—N/a	Won	
2008	Metro Radio Hits Awards	New Singer Award	—N/a	Won	
2008	Metro Radio Hits Awards	Best Dance Song	"Taxi"	Won	
2009	Ultimate Song Chart Awards Presentation	Best New Male Singer (Gold)	—N/a	Won	
2009	26th Jade Solid Gold Best Ten Music Awards Presentation	Most Popular New Male Artist (Gold)	—N/a	Won	
2009	31st RTHK Top 10 Gold Songs Awards	Most Promising Singer (Gold)	—N/a	Won	
2009	IFPI Music Sales Awards	Most Commercially Valuable Male Newcomer	—N/a	Won	
2009	Metro Radio Mandarin Hits Music Awards Presentation	Rising Singer Award	—N/a	Won	
2009	Metro Radio Hits Awards	Best Adapted Song	"Today I Finally Know I Am Wrong"	Won	
2009	Metro Radio Hits Awards	Best Dance Singer	—N/a	Won	
2009	Metro Radio Hits Awards	Most Popular Singer	—N/a	Won	
2010	27th Jade Solid Gold Best Ten Music Awards Presentation	Best Revision Song	"Today I Finally Know I Am Wrong"	Won	
2010	Metro Radio Mandarin Hits Music Awards Presentation	Best Dance Singer	—N/a	Won	
2010	Metro Radio Mandarin Hits Music Awards Presentation	Best Dance Song	"Do you wanna dance"	Won	
2011	28th Jade Solid Gold Best Ten Music Awards Presentation	Outstanding Performance Award (Gold)	—N/a	Won	
2011	9+2 Music Pioneer Awards	Most Popular Duet Song	"In the Scene" (with Gillian Chung)	Won	
2011	9+2 Music Pioneer Awards	Hot Trend Dance Singer Award	—N/a	Won	
2011	Metro Radio Mandarin Hits Music Awards Presentation	New Forces Singer Award	—N/a	Won	
2011	Metro Radio Mandarin Hits Music Awards Presentation	Best Dance Singer	—N/a	Won	
2011	Metro Radio Mandarin Hits Music Awards Presentation	Best Dance Song	"Baby Don't Cry"	Won	
2011	9th CNTV's Music King Hit Global Chinese Music Award	Best Dance Song	"LOVE U2"	Won	
2011	Metro Radio Hits Awards	Best Dance Singer	—N/a	Won	
2011	Metro Radio Hits Awards	Best Dance Song	"Baby Don't Cry"	Won	
2012	29th Jade Solid Gold Best Ten Music Awards Presentation	Best Singer-Songwriter (Bronze)	—N/a	Won	
2012	Metro Radio Mandarin Hits Music Awards Presentation	Asian Dance Singer Award	—N/a	Won	
2012	Metro Radio Hits Awards	Best Dance Singer	—N/a	Won	
2012	Metro Radio Hits Awards	Best Dance Song (Gold)	"Queen"	Won	
2015	4th iQiyi All-Star Carnival	Annual Music Grand Award	—N/a	Won	
2015	Elle Style Awards	Hot Trend Trans-boundary Singer of the Year	—N/a	Won	
2016	IFPI Music Sales Awards	Top 10 Best Selling Singers	—N/a	Won	
2016	IFPI Music Sales Awards	Top 10 Best Selling Albums (Mandarin)	Waiting	Won	
2026	7th Tencent Music Entertainment Awards	Most Influential All-rounded Singer of the Year	—N/a	Won	
2026	2026 TMElive International Music Awards (TIMA)	Asian Crossover Artist of the Year	—N/a	Won	

=== Forbes China Celebrity 100 ===
Year	Rank	Ref.
2015	70th	
2017	21st	
2019	23rd	
2020	40th	

Preceded by Deep Ng 吳浩康	New Talent Singing Awards – Hong Kong Regional Finals winner 2003	Succeeded by Keith Wong 王琪 (王凱駿)
