= Kevin Chu (actor) =

Hong Kong actor (born 1989)

- 朱鑑然
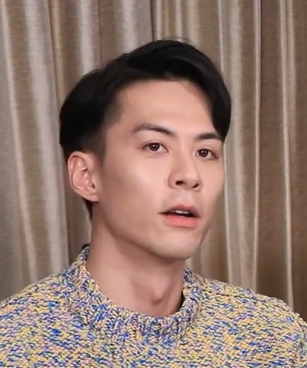
- Chu in January 2024
- Born: Chu Kam-yin; 5 January 1989 (age 37); Hong Kong
- Education: University of British Columbia (BA)
- Occupation: Actor
- Years active: 2015–present

Kevin Chu Kam-yin (Chinese: 朱鑑然; born 5 January 1989) is a Hong Kong actor and former swimmer. Chu made his onscreen debut with a minor role in To the Fore (2015), then secured main roles as David in the ViuTV series Margaret & David: Beginning (2016) and as Lok Wai in the web series Infernal Affairs (2016). He went on to star as Xu Xin-cheng in Granting You a Dreamlike Life (2018), Shum Fei-fei in Dead Ringer (2023), and Cheung Tin-ming in See Her Again (2024). He gained further recognition for playing Hong Yu in Back to the Past (2025), which is currently the fifth highest-grossing Hong Kong film of all time.

== Early life and education ==
Chu was born on 5 January 1989 in Hong Kong. His father worked in film producing, and he has an elder sister. His family migrated to Vancouver, Canada when he was two years old, and he grew up there until 1997, when he moved back to Hong Kong. He studied at St. Louis School and Wah Yan College, Kowloon, where his father was also an alumnus of the latter. Chu was a swimmer and started training competitively at the age of eight. He began representing Hong Kong in 2001 when he was 14. He broke the inter-school Grade B record for the 200 meters freestyle with a time of two minutes and 4.35 seconds in 2003, and he won the gold medal again in the same event in 2004, with a time of two minutes and 1.68 seconds. Also in 2004, he set a record for the boys' 200 meters freestyle (15-17 age group) with a time of two minutes and 12.02 seconds at the Hong Kong Age Group Championships.

Chu returned to Canada for university in 2007 and attended the University of British Columbia, majoring in human geography. He represented Hong Kong at the Asian Games and FISU World University Games, but did not qualify for the 2008 and 2012 Summer Olympics. He retired from swimming during his university years. As of March 2022, Chu is still the record holder for the Hong Kong short course 400-meter individual medley. Chu had also been modeling during university years, after conducting interviews about his swimming career with magazines, which led to him being approached by a modeling agency. After graduating, he briefly worked in an office job.

== Career ==
In 2013, Chu befriended director Dante Lam at the premiere of Unbeatable, where he was given a minor role as a bike racer due to his athletic background in Lam's next feature To the Fore. However, he only signed with Louis Koo's talent agency in 2016, as he believed contracts were "a commitment" and felt it was "not the right time" before then. That year, Chu shared the titular role of young David with David Siu in the ViuTV series Margaret & David: Beginning, and landed a main role as triad leader Lok Wai in the crime thriller web series Infernal Affairs. He also played the younger version of Lee Lee-zen's character in the drama film Sisterhood, and the drug-addicted brother of Louis Koo's character in the crime drama Dealer/Healer. In 2018, he had a main role as Xu Xin-cheng in the Chinese web series Granting You a Dreamlike Life, and a supporting role as Makino, a bank staff member and major crime suspect, in the detective film Napping Kid. In 2019, he and Angela Yuen played the younger versions of the lead duo Alex Lam and Michelle Wai in the film Lion Rock, which was praised by Edmund Lee of the South China Morning Post as a "charming duo" and being "cute to watch".

In 2022, Chu made a special appearance in the ViuTV sports series I SWIM, and played Nick Yan, a kind-hearted brother of Tavia Yeung's character, in the business thriller Modern Dynasty. He also starred as aspiring social worker Sing Shun in Look Up, and as Sincere Resell King in Social Distancing. He also secured another lead role alongside Cecilia Choi and Tony Wu in the anthology film Tales from the Occult: Body and Soul, and appeared in the thriller films Bursting Point and The Goldfinger. In late 2023, he played ice hockey player "Papa" Ha Chun-yin in the ViuTV series Sparks, and as Shum Fei-fei, a genius hacker who helps his police friend (played by Chrissie Chau) crack crimes, in the web series Dead Ringer broadcast on TVB. Chu's simultaneous appearances on both major TV stations garnered public attention, and his performances in both works received praise. He then portrayed police officer Cheung Tin-ming in the Netflix-Tencent series See Her Again, and appeared as a travel writer in the drama film Little Red Sweet. Chu also gained public recognition with the role Hong Yu, the son of Louis Koo's fictional character Hong Siu-lung, in the 2025 historical sci-fi film Back to the Past, which is currently fifth highest-grossing Hong Kong film of all time.

== Filmography ==
=== Film ===
Year	Title	Role	Notes/Ref.
2015	To the Fore	He Shu-en (何樹恩)	
2017	Sisterhood	Teenage Chen Chung (陳忠)	
2017	Dealer/Healer	Yin (賢仔)	
2018	Napping Kid	Makino (牧野)	
2019	P Storm	Cheung Ming-chi (張明志)	
2019	Lion Rock	Young David Ki	
2021	The Dragon Tamer	Ouyang Ke	
2022	Anita	Love interest of Anita Mui	Only in director's cut
2022	Chilli Laugh Story	Coba's ex-boss	
2022	Look Up	Sing Shun (成信)	
2022	Warriors of Future	Signaller	
2022	Social Distancing	Sincere Resell King (先達小炒王)	
2023	Tales from the Occult: Body and Soul	Johnnie	
2023	Bursting Point	Suave (瀟灑)	
2023	The Goldfinger	Lam Sing (林誠)	
2024	I Did It My Way	Nam (阿南)	Special appearance
2024	Crisis Negotiators	For (阿科)	
2025	Little Red Sweet	Soar Orr (柯宇翔)	
2025	Back to the Past	Hong Yu	
2026	Cold War 1994	Roy Ho (何國正)	

=== Television ===
Year	Title	Role	Notes/Ref.
2016	Margaret & David: Beginning	Young David (大衛)	Main role
2016	Infernal Affairs	Lok Wai (洛威)	Main role
2018	Granting You a Dreamlike Life	Xu Xin-cheng (許星程)	Main role
2018	Shadow of Justice	Three-eight (三八)	Main role
2020	Iron Ladies	Roger	Recurring role
2022	I SWIM	To (杜師兄)	Special appearance
2022	Modern Dynasty	Nick Yan (甄誠)	Recurring role
2023	Sparks	"Papa" Ha Chun-yin (夏竣然)	Main role
2023	Dead Ringer	Shum Fei-fei (沈飛飛)	Main role
2024	See Her Again	Cheung Tin-ming (張天明)	Main role
2025	What If	Danny	Guest role
2026	COURT!	Mark Kwong (鄺澤熙)	Main role
