= Lu Han =

Chinese singer (born 1990)

- 鹿晗
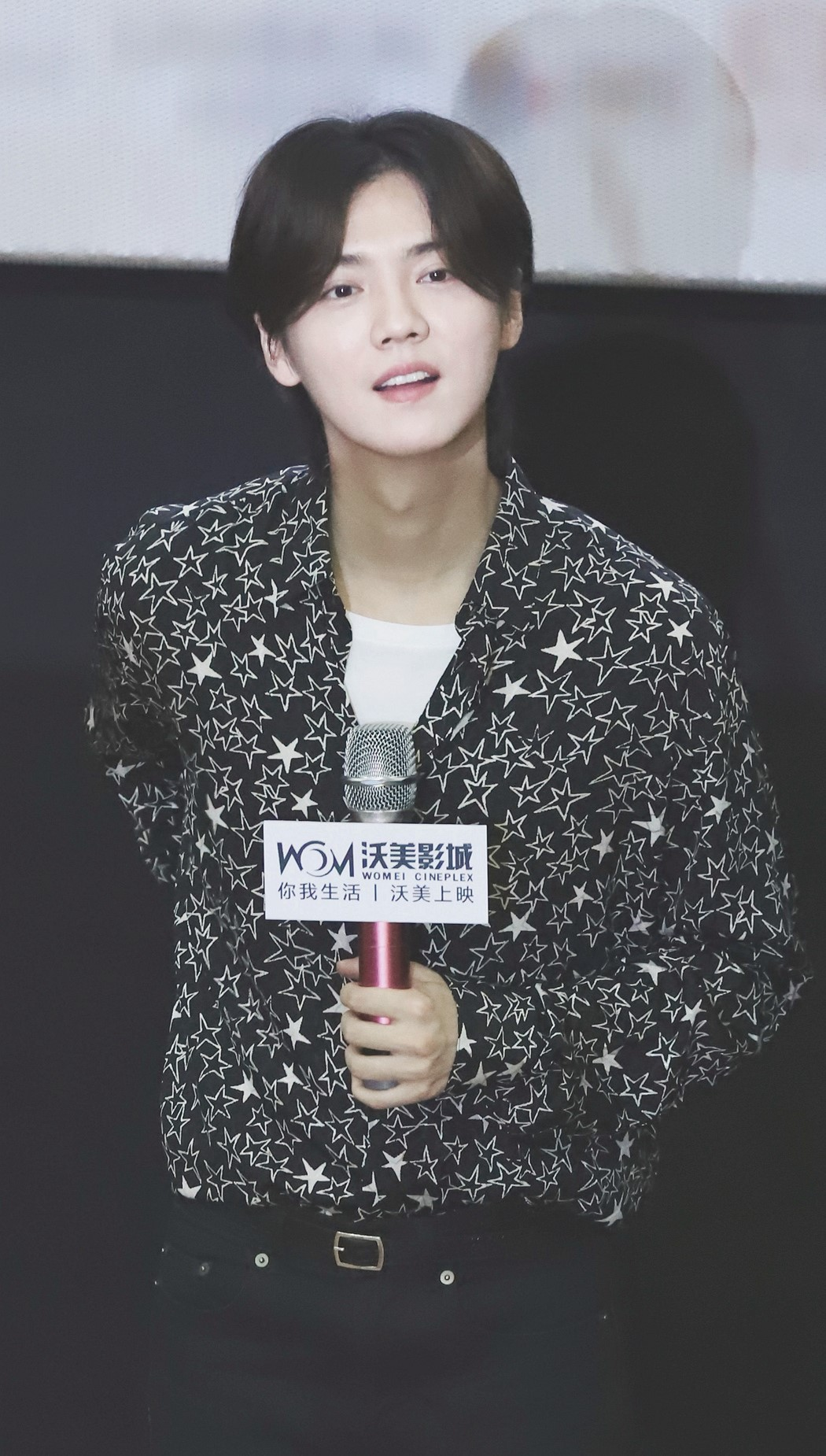
- Luhan in 2019
- Born: April 20, 1990 (age 36); Haidian, Beijing, China
- Education: Seoul Institute of the Arts
- Occupations: Singer; dancer; actor
- Years active: 2011–present
- Musical career
- Origin: Seoul, South Korea
- Genres: Mandopop; K-pop
- Instrument: Vocals
- Labels: SM; LuHan Studio
- Formerly of: Exo; Exo-M; Younique Unit; SM Town

Chinese name
- Chinese: 鹿晗
Transcriptions
Standard Mandarin
- Hanyu Pinyin: Lù Hán

Korean name
- Hangul: 루한
Transcriptions
- Revised Romanization: Ru Han
- McCune–Reischauer: Ru Han

Signature
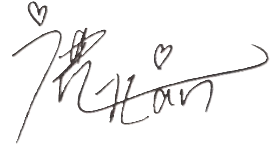

Lu Han (Chinese: 鹿晗; born April 20, 1990), also known mononymously as Luhan, is a Chinese singer, actor, and dancer. He was a member of the South Korean-Chinese boy group Exo and its sub-group Exo-M, before leaving the group in October 2014. That year, he was ranked the sixth most popular entertainment star in China by China National Radio. In 2017, Lu Han was listed as the second highest-paid celebrity in the Forbes China Celebrity 100, behind only Fan Bingbing.

Lu Han released his solo debut album Reloaded in 2015, and has starred in several box office hits such as 20 Once Again (2015), The Witness (2015), and Time Raiders (2016). In 2017, he starred in his first television series, Fighter of the Destiny.

== Early life ==
Lu Han was born on April 20, 1990, in Haidian, Beijing, China. He graduated from Beijing Shida Middle School and attended Beijing Haidian Foreign Language Shi Yan School before leaving for South Korea to attend Yonsei University as an exchange student. He majored in Applied Music at the Seoul Institute of the Arts.

In 2008, Lu Han unsuccessfully auditioned for JYP Entertainment at their global audition in China. In 2010, while studying in Seoul, he was scouted while in Myeong-dong by an SM Entertainment representative who recommended he audition for the company; after which he became a trainee under the agency.

== Music career ==
=== 2011–2014: Exo ===
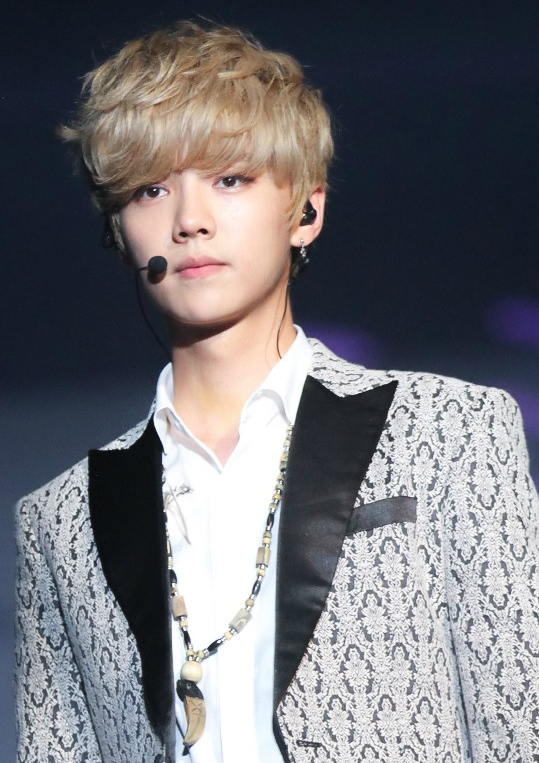
Luhan at the EXO Lost Planet in Singapore, August 23, 2014

Along with Tao, Chen, and Kai, Luhan made his first televised performance at the SBS Gayo Daejeon on December 29, 2011. Following this appearance, he was the second member of Exo to be officially introduced, as one of the four Chinese members of the group and its Mandarin-language sub-group Exo-M.

On October 10, 2014, Luhan filed a lawsuit against SM Entertainment to nullify his contract and effectively left Exo.

=== 2015–2016: Solo debut and first tour ===
Luhan often contributed to the soundtracks of movies he participated in. He sung the theme song for 20 Once Again, titled "Our Tomorrow". The music video of the song surpassed 1 million views in 47 minutes, setting a new record. He then released a rendition of "Tian mi mi" for the film Comrades: Almost a Love Story. Director Peter Chan is said to have asked Luhan to participate due to his gentle and clear voice as he felt it would be effective in expressing the emotions of the song.

Luhan first announced his solo album in July 2015, where he collaborated with famous producer Djemba Djemba. This was also Djemba's first time producing an album for an Asian artist. The same month, he collaborated with David Tao in a bidding song for the 2022 Winter Olympics held in Beijing.

Luhan's first digital album Reloaded I was released on September 10, 2015, via QQ Music charts. It sold 880,000 copies on the first day, the highest recorded sales number on the first day of official release. Reloaded I also reached over one million sales on QQ Music, setting the record for fastest digital album sales. In November, he released the single "Medals", which also serves as the soundtrack for the 2015 film The Witness. Medals topped the V Chart as well as Billboard Hot 100, becoming the first Mandarin single to top the latter. In December, he released "Deep", a promotional song for the Chinese version of Kungfu Panda 3.

Luhan's first studio album, Reloaded was released on December 14, 2015. The album topped the Tower Records chart in Japan, and became the only album from mainland China to enter the Top 5 of Taiwan's G-Music year-end chart. Reloaded sold over 3 million copies and was also certified platinum by the International Federation of the Phonographic Industry, becoming the first album in mainland China to do so.

Luhan attended the QQ Music Awards, winning the Best Digital Album of the Year for Reloaded as well as the Best Male Singer of the Year. He then embarked on his first solo concert tour, the "Luhan Reloaded: 2016 Luhan 1st China Tour". The tour traveled to Beijing on March 26, Guangzhou on April 2, and Shanghai on April 9. The same month, he won the All-round Artist of the Year and Media Recommended Album of the Year awards at the Chinese Golden Charts Awards; and the Album of the Year and Artist of the Year awards at the 4th V Chart Awards. He is also the first Chinese singer to achieve a double platinum record, having sold over 2 million copies of Reloaded I.

=== 2016–present: XXVII (27) ===
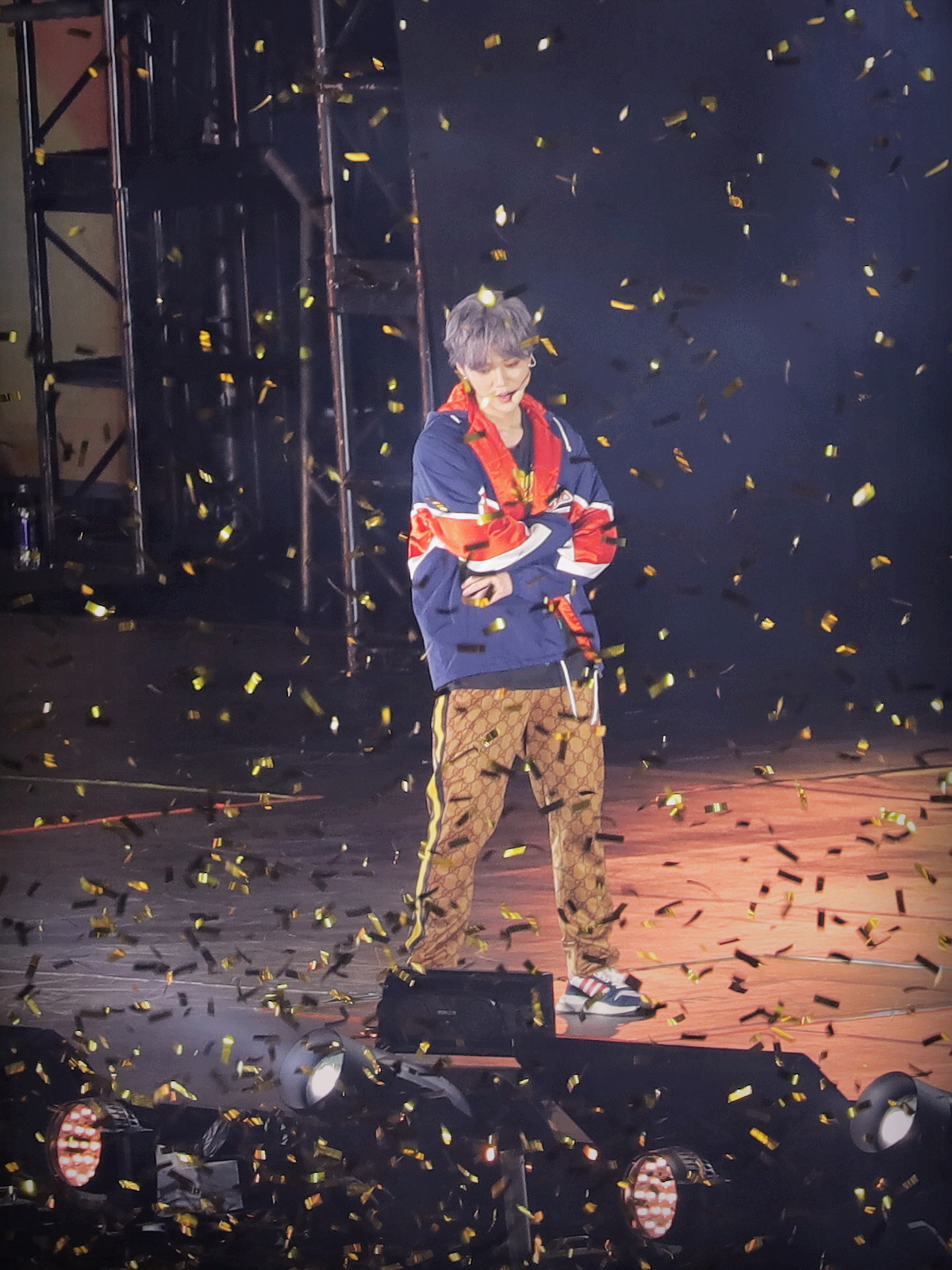
Luhan performing at Hangzhou, 2018

Starting from late 2016, Luhan announced that he will be releasing a series of albums under the theme "XXVII", which stands for "Xperience", "Xplore", "Venture", "Imagination" and "I". The albums are meant to document Luhan's growth story at the age of 27.

On October 21, 2016, Luhan unveiled his third digital album Xperience with the track "Catch Me When I Fall". The song is jointly produced by Santell, whom participated in Luhan's first solo album Reloaded, and the Picard Brothers, a French producer team who has crafted songs for Diplo and Chris Brown. On December 27, 2016, he published his fourth digital album Xplore, containing the tracks "Winter Song" and "Skin to Skin". "Skin to Skin' is Luhan's second English-language song, and incorporates various genres such as R&B, Future Bass, Electro and House.

On February 21, 2017, Luhan unveiled his fifth digital album Venture with the songs "What if I Said" and "Roleplay". He participated in writing the lyrics for the track "Roleplay", which details his own experience in dealing with harassment from the paparazzi. "Imagination" was released in April 2017 and consisted of two tracks – "On Call" (his first attempt at the fusion jazz genre) and "Say It". "I", the last part of the album series, was released in June 2017 with two songs "Set It Off" and "On Fire".

On July 20, 2017, Luhan won the "Album of the Year" award at the Asian Music Gala for the XXVII album series. On September 9, 2017, he released a single for the soundtrack of the film Sky Hunter.

On April 17, 2019, Luhan released a single album, π-volume.1, which sold over 3.4 million copies. On August 30, 2019, he released a second single album, π-volume.2, which sold over 1.2 million copies.

On January 17, 2020, Luhan released a single, "Dream Up", to promote his third concert tour.

== Television and film career ==
Luhan made his film debut in the 2015 film 20 Once Again, the Chinese remake of the Korean hit movie Miss Granny. It topped box office charts and broke records to become the highest-grossing Korean-Chinese co-produced film. For his performance, he won the "Newcomer of the Year" award at the Beijing International Film Festival, as well as the "Most Popular Actor" award at the Beijing College Student Film Festival. The same year, he joined the cast of Hurry Up, Brother, a spin-off from the original South Korean variety program Running Man. Luhan then starred opposite Yang Mi in the crime thriller The Witness, a remake of the 2011 Korean movie Blind.

In 2016, he starred in the fantasy-action-adventure film Time Raiders, based on the online novel series Tomb Raiders. The film premiered on August 5 and topped box office charts, becoming the biggest summer hit of 2016. He then featured in The Great Wall, a historical epic directed by Zhang Yimou.

In 2017, Luhan starred in his first television drama Fighter of the Destiny, a fantasy wuxia series based on the novel of the same name. In June, he was cast in the youth sports drama Sweet Combat alongside Guan Xiaotong. In September, it was announced that Luhan was cast in the upcoming science fiction film Shanghai Fortress alongside Shu Qi. The film is adapted from the 2006 novel Once Upon a Time in Shanghai and was released in 2019.

== In the media ==
Luhan has been dubbed by foreign media as the Chinese counterpart of popular pop star Justin Bieber, due to his massive popularity and dedicated fandom in China. The term "Luhan effect" was used to describe his massive influence among fans. He currently holds the Guinness World Record for the "Most Comments on a Weibo Post", which was established in August 2014 and subsequently surpassed by Luhan himself in September 2015. In 2016, he set a second Guinness World Record for the "Largest gathering of people wearing antlers" at the 2016 LuHan Reloaded China Tour, in Beijing, China. He is also noted for his achievements in both music and film, holding records on Chinese digital music platforms; and ranking at the top of the Star Box-office Chart on nuomi.com, one of the country's largest online ticket-buying platforms.

Yan Siwei, a broker who works in the entertainment industry, opined that Luhan stands for a new fandom model; in this model, the artist uses social media data instead of works to galvanize fans, and the fans are well-organized to protect the artist and maintain the fandom. GQ did an investigation on the fandom and call it "a systemic, detailed social labor division and powerful execution empire." After Luhan outsold Jay Chou by several million albums, some raised concerns about whether Mandopop has "died" or become over-commercialized. In 2019, the failure of Shanghai Fortress made some question if Luhan and this model would flop soon. A guest in a talk program opined that these kind of artists are "meteors" instead of "stars."

Luhan first appeared on the Forbes China Celebrity 100 in 2015, ranking 37th. He rose up 35 spots to rank 2nd in 2017, becoming the highest ranked male celebrity in China. In 2016, Luhan was featured on Business of Fashion's "BOF 100" rankings, becoming the only Chinese celebrity to make it onto the rankings, and was given the title of "Most Anticipated Chinese Star". He is also the first celebrity born after 1990 to be named the "Artist of the Year" by China Newsweek.

== Endorsements and ambassador roles ==
Luhan is one of the most in-demand brand ambassadors in China, particularly among the younger generation. His endorsement ranges from local products such as Oppo mobile phones and Baidu interactive maps to international ones like Puma and Cartier SA, of which he is their first Asian endorser.

On December 1, 2015, Luhan was announced to be the official China ambassador of Star Wars. He released a single titled "The Inner Force", which is the official Chinese promotional theme song for Star Wars: The Force Awakens.

From 2015 to 2016, Luhan appeared on the cover of more than 20 magazines. He became the first Chinese celebrity to grace the covers of Elle China, GQ Style, Forbes China, Harper's Bazaar, and Cosmopolitan. He broke the record for having more than 200,000 people buy out a 20,000 limited edition run of a magazine cover in one second.

== Personal life ==
=== Relationship ===
On October 8, 2017, Luhan and Chinese actress Guan Xiaotong admitted that they were dating.

=== Political views ===
In August 2019, during the 2019–20 Hong Kong protests, Luhan shared photos of the Chinese flag accompanied by the hashtags "the Chinese national flag has 1.4 billion flag bearers" and "I am a flag bearer" on his official Weibo account.

== Discography ==
- Reloaded (2015)
- XXVII+ (2017)

== Filmography ==
=== Film ===
Year	Title	Role	Notes
2015	20 Once Again	Xiang Qianjin	
2015	12 Golden Ducks	K-pop dancer	Cameo
2015	The Witness	Lin Chong	Lead role
2016	Time Raiders	Wu Xie	Lead role
2016	The Great Wall	Peng Yong	
2016	See You Tomorrow	Ma Li (young)	Cameo
2017	The Founding of an Army	Deng Xiaoping	Cameo
2019	Shanghai Fortress	Jiang Yang	

=== Television drama ===
Year	Title	Role	Notes/Ref.
2012	To the Beautiful You	Himself	Cameo; episode 2
2017	Fighter of the Destiny	Chen Changsheng	
2018	Sweet Combat	Ming Tian	
2020	Cross Fire	Xiao Feng	
2020	Sisyphus	Zhao Binbin	

=== Variety shows ===
Year	Title	Role	Notes/Ref.
2015–2018	Keep Running	Cast member	
2018	Hot Blood Dance Crew	Dance mentor	
2020	Produce Camp 2020	Mentor	

=== Music videos ===
Title	Year	Ref.
"Maxstep" (as part of Younique Unit)	2012	
"Our Tomorrow"	2014	
"Sweet Honey"	2015	
"Please Come to the Great Wall to Ski" (with David Tao)	2015	
"Medals"	2015	
"Deep"	2015	
"The Inner Force"	2016	
"Back to 17"	2016	
"Let Me By Your Side"	2016	
"Chasing Dream With Childlike Heart"	2017	
Guest appearances
"The Last Game" (remake; Kim Min-kyo)	2014	

== Accolades ==
=== Awards and nominations ===
Year	Nominated work	Award	Category	Result	Ref.
2014		2014 Baidu Moments Conference	Most Valuable Male Star	Won	
2014		iQiyi All-Star Carnival Night	Asia Popular Idol Award	Won	
2014		Tudou Young Choice Awards	Person of the Year	Won	
2014		Baidu Fudian	Annual Most Popular Male Artist	Won	
2015		2014 Sina Weibo Night	Weibo Male God of the Year	Won	
2015		2014 Sina Weibo Night	Weibo King	Won	
2015	20 Once Again	5th Beijing International Film Festival	Newcomer of the Year	Won	
2015	20 Once Again	22nd Beijing College Student Film Festival	Most Popular Actor	Won	
2015	20 Once Again	22nd Beijing College Student Film Festival	Best Newcomer	Nominated	
2015	20 Once Again	12th Guangzhou University Student Film Festival	Most Popular Actor	Won	
2016	Reloaded	QQ Music Awards	Best Digital Album of the Year	Won	
2016		QQ Music Awards	Best Male Singer of the Year	Won	
2016	Reloaded	Music Radio Global Chinese Golden Chart	Media Recommended Album of the Year	Won	
2016		Music Radio Global Chinese Golden Chart	All-round Artist of the Year	Won	
2016	"Medals"	Music Radio Global Chinese Golden Chart	Top 20 Songs of the Year	Won	
2016	Reloaded	4th V Chart Awards	Best Album of the Year	Won	
2016		4th V Chart Awards	Best Male Artist – Mainland	Won	
2016		Tencent Star Awards	Asia All-Round Artist Award	Won	
2016		iQiyi All-Star Carnival	Asia All-Rounded Artist	Won	
2017	XXVII	Asian Music Gala	Album of the Year	Won	
2017	"Winter Song"	Fresh Asia Chart Festival 2017	Top 10 Songs	Won	
2017	"What If I Said"	Fresh Asia Chart Festival 2017	Top 10 Songs	Won	
2017	"On Call"	Fresh Asia Chart Festival 2017	Top 10 Songs	Won	
2017	"Skin to Skin"	Fresh Asia Chart Festival 2017	Best Music Video	Won	
2018		iQiyi Scream Night 2019	All-round Artist of the Year	Won	

=== Forbes China Celebrity 100 ===
Year	Rank	Ref.
2015	31st	
2017	2nd	
2019	13th	
2020	15th	
