= The Mystic Nine Side Story: Flowers Bloom in February =

- Simplified Chinese: 老九门番外之二月花开
- Directed by: Lin Nan
- Screenplay by: Kennedy Xu
- Based on: Daomu Biji by Nanpai Sanshu
- Produced by: Bai Yicong
- Starring: Lay Zhang
- Production companies: iQiyi, Dragon TV, NP Entertainment
- Release date: 20 October 2016
- Running time: 90 minutes
- Country: China
- Language: Mandarin

The Mystic Nine Side Story: Flowers Bloom in February (Chinese: 老九门番外之二月花开; pinyin: Lǎo jiǔ mén fānwài zhī èr yuè huā kāi; lit. 'Old Nine Gates Flowers Bloom in February') is a side story of the drama The Mystic Nine. The web film was co-produced by iQiyi, Dragon TV and NP Entertainment and was released on October 20, 2016. This spin off is a continuation of the television series whereby it solely focuses on character Er Yuehong portrayed by Lay Zhang.

== Background ==
The side story serves as a spin off and continuation to The Mystic Nine which is a prequel to the Chinese television series The Lost Tomb based on the internet novel Daomu Biji. The plot of the story revolves around the main character of The Mystic Nine which is Er Yuehong.

== Synopsis ==
The side story narrates the effort of relocating a cultural relic safeguarded beneath an ancient tomb during the Sino-Japanese era. Er Yuehong undertook this mission by approaching the tomb which on surface is a heavily pre-occupied Japanese army base. Tapping his skills for Chinese opera and utilising his connections, he performed as an opera singer while fighting off the Japanese soldiers on the other. With his wisdom and bravery, he strives with his might to recover the relic.

== Cast ==
- Lay Zhang as Er Yuehong (二月红), second master of the mystic nine clan. An expert at tomb raiding due to his family background, but chooses to become an opera singer due to his passion.
- Zhang Zheng Yang as Shenggong Weilai (神宫未来), the second in command to Qiu Shan who is ruthless and would stop at nothing to achieve victory.
- Ming Zheng as Qiu Shan (秋山), a Japanese commander who harbours a deep fondness for Chinese opera and culture.
- He Yujun as Ji An (吉安), friend to Er Yuehong. Perished while completing his mission.
- Liu Weiling as Hong Gu (红杏), servant of Er Yuehong who accompanied him on his adventure.
- Mou Yuandi as Bai Zhanmei (白湛梅), frenemy to Er Yuehong who rendered his assistance to the latter.

== Soundtrack ==
All tracks are written by The Mystic Nine Side Story: Flowers Bloom in February Soundtrack.

No.	Title	Length
1.	"Liang Bao Hou (凉薄侯)"

== Reception ==
The film streamed over 93 million views on IQiYi.

== Awards and nominations ==
Year	Award	Category	Results	Ref.
2016	2016 EN Awards	Web Film Chart: Top 10 Web Films	Won	
2017	Weibo Movie Night Awards	Most Influential Web Movie	Won	
2017	2nd Asia New Media Film Festival	Best Web Film	Won	
2017	2nd Asia New Media Film Festival	Best Scriptwriter (Nanpai Sanshu)	Won	
