= The Mystic Nine =

2016 Chinese mystery series

- Official Drama Poster
- Also known as: Lao Jiu Men; Old Nine Gates
- Genre: Action; Adventure; Mystery; Supernatural
- Based on: Daomu Biji by Nanpai Sanshu
- Written by: Bai Yicong
- Directed by: Liang Shengquan (S1); He Shupei (S1); Huang Junwen (S1); Bai Shan (S2)
- Starring: William Chan (S1, S2); Lay Zhang (S1); Zhao Liying (S1); Zeng Shunxi (S2); Chen Yao (S2)
- Opening theme: My Clan by William Chan; Returning Soul Door by Anson Hu
- Ending theme: Dian Yu Si by Li Nan
- Country of origin: China
- Original language: Mandarin
- No. of seasons: 2
- No. of episodes: 48 (Season 1); 30 (Season 2)

Production
- Producers: Zhang Yuxin; Li Guohua; Bai Yicong
- Production locations: Zhejiang, Hengdian
- Running time: 40 mins
- Production companies: Ciwen Media Group, iQiyi

Original release
- Network: iQiyi, Dragon TV (Season 1); Youku (Season 2)
- Release: 4 July – 17 October 2016

Related
- The Lost Tomb; The Lost Tomb 2: Explore with the Note; The Lost Tomb 2: Heavenly Palace on the Clouds; Ultimate Note; Tibetan Sea Flower; Tomb of the Sea; Reunion: The Sound of the Providence

The Mystic Nine (Chinese: 老九门; pinyin: Lǎo Jiǔ Mén, lit. Old Nine Gates) is a prequel to the Chinese television series The Lost Tomb based on the internet novel Daomu Biji. It aired on Dragon TV and was broadcast online via iQiyi from 4 July to 17 October 2016.

The drama is a commercial success in China. It is one of the most watched Chinese dramas, with over 12 billion views in total.

On 30 July 2026, a sequel Mystic Nine (Chinese: 九门; pinyin: Jiǔ Mén, lit. Nine Gates) with William Chan returning as its lead character Zhang Qishan was released on Youku, 10 years after its original debut.

== Synopsis ==
=== Season 1 ===
During the era of the republic, the town of Changsha was guarded by nine families known as the "Old Nine Gates" (or the "Mystic Nine" Clan). They were incredibly powerful families who wield supreme power over everything in Changsha.

In year 1933, a mysterious train ended in Changsha station. The leader of the Nine Gates, Zhang Qishan (William Chan), who was also the army commander of Changsha, started to investigate with Qi Tiezui (Ying Haoming) and they discovered a highly suspicious mine just outside of Changsha. In order to solve the mystery of the mine, they decided to engage the help of Er Yuehong (Lay Zhang), who was an opera singer that came from a family of archaeologists. However, Er Yuehong was reluctant to help them as his wife Ya Tou (Yuan Bingyan) was terminally ill. In order to procure the medicine for treating her, Zhang Qishan travelled to Beiping with Er Yuehong, Ya Tou, and Qi Tiezui, the eighth leader of the Mystic Nine; they met the young mistress of the hotel Yin Xinyue (Zhao Liying) there. The five of them later returned to Changsha and discovered how the mystery of the mine was connected to their families’ histories and the Japanese's sinister plot against Changsha.

=== Season 2 ===
The 401 Unit under the command of Zhang Qishan (William Chan), the leader of the Nine Gates and the army commander of Changsha, mysteriously vanished en masse while on a secret mission outside the city. Zhang joins forces with Wu Laogou (Zeng Shunxi) and Huo Xiangu (Chen Yao) to uncover the truth. As the investigation deepened, a shocking secret buried for a century and a massive conspiracy gradually came to light.

== Cast ==
=== Main ===
- William Chan as Zhang Qishan (张启山), also known as Fo Ye. The leader of the mystic nine clan and a defense commander for the city of Changsha. He has a strong military influence and the people's trust. Became leader after a rumor spread all over Changsha of him teleporting a Golden Buddha over to his manor in one night.
- Lay Zhang as Er Yuehong (二月红), casually known as Er Ye, is the second master of the mystic nine clan. An expert at tomb raiding due to his family background, but chooses to become an opera singer due to his passion. He specializes in metal pellets and martial arts just like Zhang Qi Shan. He loves Ya Tou dearly.
- Zhao Liying as Yin Xinyue (尹新月), mistress of crescent hotel. Zhang Qishan's love interest and later wife.
- Ying Haoming as Qi Tiezui (齐铁嘴), also called Ba Ye and as Lao Ba, is the eighth master of the mystic nine clan. Saved by Zhang Qishan after he was captured by the Japanese bandits. He is skilled in fortune-telling and divination, also a good friend of Fo Ye and Er Ye.
- Yuan Bingyan as Ya Tou (丫头）, Er Yuehong wife. She and Er Yuehong knew each other from young till adult, he saved her from being sold as a slave then they got married. She has a mysterious sickness that Er Yuehong tries to desperately cure.
- Zeng Shunxi as Wu Laogou (吴老狗), fifth master of the Mystic Nine clan. (Season 2)
- Chen Yao as Huo Xiangu（霍仙姑）, seventh master of the Mystic Nine clan (Season 2)

=== Supporting ===
- Hu Yunhao as Chen Pi Ah Si (陈皮阿四), fourth master of the mystic nine clan who is known for his cruel ways. Specializes in metal pellets and the flying guillotine. He is the disciple of Er Yuehong and Ya Tou and works at their residence. Also has a special love interest for Ya Tou. Falls prey to all kinds of rumors and talks from Commander Lu and The Japanese.
- Wang Meiren as Huo Jinxi (霍锦惜), the only female member of the mystic nine clan. Raised as head of the household at age 15. She specializes in seduction and carries blades behind her hair. She Loves Er Yuehong. And is willing to give up everything for him. However, she harbors a hate towards Zhang Qishan which causes her to work with the Japanese to get rid of him.
- Wang Chuang as Lu Jianxun (陆建勋), Zhang Qishan's political opponent. A greedy and jealous commander who gets his hands bloody just for what he wants. Dies by the hand of the Mysterious Zhang family after getting his hands on the stone found in the mines.
- Zhang Ming'en as Lieutenant Zhang Ri Shan (张日山), Zhang Qishan right-handed man. He is loyal and obedient and is placed to protect Ba Ye and everyone else when his commander is not around.
- Yang Zijiang as Xiao Xiejiu (小解九), ninth master of the mystic nine clan. Zhang Qishan and Er Yuehong's good friend. He specializes in strategy and planning ahead before an enemy strikes. He has connections with Japanese Departments and Trade networks. He also has some medical knowledge.
- Li Naiwen as Banjie Li (半截李), third master of the mystic nine clan.
- Zhang Luyi as Wu Laogou (吴老狗), fifth master of the mystic nine clan. Has hellhounds that are vicious and scary.
- Li Zonghan as Hei Bei the Sixth (黑背老六), sixth master of the mystic nine clan. Only one among the nine families who has a thug origin.
- Stokes Andrew Charles as Cox Hendry (裘德考), the main antagonist. He gave morphine to Ya Tou to trick Chen Pi A Si into helping him. A mysterious man that has a lot of knowledge about the Mystic Nine.

=== Extended ===
- San Shu as Cun Dafu (村大夫)
- Peng Xiaoran as Shi Huai Shan (怀婵) [Protector of Bai Qiao (白乔护法)
- Jia Jiangfeng as Lieutenant Lu (陆副官), Does all of Commander Lu's dirty work.
- Wang Guan as Peng Sanbian (彭三鞭),
- Huang Zixi as Mo Ce (莫测), Miss Xiu's Cousin that studies in Western medicine. She was mistaken by Second Lord to be Ya Tou. Therefore, triggering her to fall for Second Lord as her love interest. She healed Zhang Qi Shan and Er Yue's injuries after the return from the mine expedition.
- Zhou Xiaofei as Ryouko Tanaka (田中良子), A Japanese Soldier that works for at the American Commerce with the main antagonist. Though she falls prey to her own ambitions and doesn't quite listen to her boss.
- Zhang Chunzhong as Mysterious Old Man (神秘老头), he was blinded by the Japanese when he worked in the mines. Also one of the only survivors left that. Was protected by Second Master's Great Uncle when working the minds. He was trapped in the mines for a long time awaiting to send a message to second master. However, he died from the Hair Disease after trying to escape with everyone else.
- Wu Li as Tao Hua (桃花)
- Wang Xiaoyi as Xiao Kui (小葵)
- Ren Wanqing as Er Kui (二葵)
- Dai Qihua as Listening Slave (听奴), Miss Xi's right-hand woman in the Hotel. Has the unique gift to listen to all conversations in the building.
- Li Ruichao as Bei Lei Ye (贝勒爷)
- Zhou Tingwei as Jiushan Mei Zhi (鸠山美志)
- Zhou Peixuan as Auction Host (主持人)
- Zheng Guolin as Jiu Laoye (舅老爷)
- Wang Bin as Wuteng Yi Lang (武藤一郎)
- Huang Wenhao as Zhang Qishan's father (张启山父亲), dies after getting shot by the Japanese when running away.
- Sun Mingjun as Xiao Sanzi (小三子)
- Tang Yongnan as Si'er / Fourth (四儿)
- Mao Yiwen as Liu'er /Sixth (六儿)
- Gong Sile as Eighteenth (老十八)
- Zuo Xiaolong as Da Long (大龙)
- Xue Wenhua as Old Worker (老矿工)
- Chen Zejia as Young Worker (少年矿工)
- Li Yaojing as Hei Shi (黑石)
- Yang Qingshu as Cui Cui (翠翠)
- Tong Xiaomei as Chen Pi's grandmother (陈皮奶奶)
- Cheng Dachun as Fourth Master of the Mystic Nine (九门老四), Was murdered and lured by a trap sent by Commander Lu. Was killed by Chen Pi with the Flying Guillotine that flew through the window.
- Jin Meiling and Jin Qiling as Twins (双生花), Two beautiful twins that have the ability to lure and seduce men for their riches. Returned the favor to Eighth Lord after he helped them find their missing jewelry.
- Huang Tianqi as Zhang Youth (张家少年)
- He Zhonghua as Train Station Master (火车站长)
- Lu Xingyu as Photographer (摄影师)
- Su Mao as Uncle Yi (尹大伯)
- He Jiayi as Aunt Huo (霍姨母)
- Lee Bao'er as Bai Qiao Fatty (白乔胖子), befriends Lieutenant Zhang and Eight master when they arrive at Baiqiao village. Knows a lot of the information around town.
- Wang Jun as Leader of the Han (汉人首领)
- Dai Xuanru as Xiao Hong (小红)
- Yang Xue as Xiao Meng (小孟)

== Production ==
Chief director, Liang Shengquan has previously directed many well known dramas including The Journey of Flower, Swords of Legends and Chinese Paladin 3.

Cost for the drama amounted up to CN¥168 million; where 70% was allocated for production. The producer, Bai Yicong expressed his gratitude to the main cast for lowering their professional fee. Usually, payment for the main cast would cost up to 60% of the budget but only 30% went back to the cast of The Mystic Nine. As such, more resources were diverted to the set designing, special effects, equipments and props for production as required by the plot.

=== Casting ===
The cast for the series were introduced through posters which were uploaded online. Chapters related to the character Zhang Qishan (portrayed by William Chan) gained over 70 million readers not long after the announcement of the cast. A ceremony was held for the drama's commencement on the first day of the Shanghai Television Festival on July 6, 2016.

The Mystic Nine is Zhao Liying's second collaboration with both William Chan and Lay Zhang, after Legend of Zu Mountain and Royal Treasure respectively.

=== Filming ===
Principal photography started on 23 November 2015 at Hengdian Studios. The entire series took 108 days to complete filming. The scenes set in Zhang Qishan and Er Yuehong's mansion were filmed in Hengdian World Studios, in Dongyang, Zhejiang province. The tombstone scenes were filmed in various parts of China such as Tiantai Mountain, Jietou Town and Hanshanhu at Tiantai County and Yongkang in Zhejiang province and in Manchuria.

Filming of Season 2 started on 1 June 2025 at Hengdian Studios, and wrapped up on 23 September 2025.

== Soundtrack ==
=== Season 1 ===
The Mystic Nine - Original Television Soundtrack (老九门电视剧原声音乐大碟)
No.	Title	Music	Length
1.	"My Clan (我门)"	William Chan
2.	"Returning Soul Door (还魂门)"	Anson Hu
3.	"Dian Yu Si (典狱司)"	Li Nan

=== Season 2 ===
Mystic Nine - Original Television Soundtrack (九门电视剧原声音乐大碟)
No.	Title	Music	Length
1.	"Listening in Silence (听无声处)"	Zhou Shen
2.	"Game for it (奉陪)"	William Chan
3.	"Tong Gui (同归)"	Zeng Shunxi
4.	"Fan Hua Liu Nian (繁花流年)"	Xilin Nayi
5.	"Po Zhen Zi (破阵子)"	Li Changchao
6.	"Shan He Huang (山河荒)"	Ayanga
7.	"Not Afraid of Us (哪怕我们)"	William Chan

== Reception ==
The series placed first in television ratings and became the number one most searched and discussed topic online during its broadcast. The drama also set a record for the most online views garnered in a day.

Following the series, a wax figure dressed of Zhang Qishan (portrayed by William Chan) was added to Madame Tussauds Shanghai in April 2017. Another wax figure of Er Yuehong (portrayed by Zhang Yixing) was added to Madame Tussauds Shanghai in October 2018.

The drama garnered over 12 billion viewers on iQiYi, and earned about CN¥288 million.

=== Ratings ===
China Dragon TV premiere ratings (CSM52)
Episode	Broadcast date	Ratings (%)	Audience share (%)	Rankings
1-2	2016.07.4	1.108	5.575	1
3-4	2016.07.5	0.921	4.464	1
5-6	2016.07.11	0.888	4.501	1
7-8	2016.07.12	0.984	4.792	1
9-10	2016.07.18	1.213	6.158	1
11-12	2016.07.19	1.111	5.411	1
13-14	2016.07.25	1.158	6.031	1
15-16	2016.07.26	0.941	4.709	1
17-18	2016.08.01	1.057	5.250	2
19-20	2016.08.02	0.945	4.671	2
21-22	2016.08.08	1.079	4.872	2
23-24	2016.08.09	0.931	4.106	2
25-26	2016.08.15	0.973	4.612	1
27-28	2016.08.16	0.922	4.265	2
29-30	2016.08.22	1.042	5.256	1
31-32	2016.08.23	1.046	5.141	1
35-36	2016.09.05	0.984	5.375	1
37-38	2016.09.12	0.667	3.790	2
39-40	2016.09.19	0.669	3.813	1
41-42	2016.09.26	0.682	4.034	1
43-44	2016.10.03	0.603	3.197	2
45-46	2016.10.10	0.620	3.710	1
47-48	2016.10.17	0.600	3.606	1

- Highest ratings are marked in red, lowest ratings are marked in blue
- In China, 1% viewership rating is considered extremely high since China has a high population.

== Endorsement ==
=== Season 1 ===
The drama endorsed a number of brands throughout the whole broadcast. Apart from endorsing the title sponsor to the series, Xiang Piao Piao, the brand also endorsed Eastroc Super Drink, Rio, iQianJin, Mengniu Dairy, Tantan App and Ctrip.

=== Season 2 ===
Title sponsor of this season was Jin Ling Guan, which had lead actor William Chan as its brand ambassador. Other endorsements were Yuanqi Cenling, Baisui Mountain, Zhan Ma, Tianmao etc.

== Awards and nominations ==
Year	Award	Category	Nominee	Result	Ref.
2016	3rd Hengdian Film and TV Festival of China	Online Popularity Award	The Mystic Nine	Won	
2016	3rd Hengdian Film and TV Festival of China	Best Actress	Zhao Liying	Won	
2016	3rd Hengdian Film and TV Festival of China	Rising Star Award	Zhang Mingen	Won	
2016	iQiyi All-Star Carnival	Drama of the Year	The Mystic Nine	Won	
2016	iQiyi All-Star Carnival	Person of the Year	William Chan	Won	
2016	iQiyi All-Star Carnival	Artist of the Year	Zhao Liying	Won	
2016	iQiyi All-Star Carnival	Newcomer Award	Hu Yunhao	Won	
2016	iQiyi All-Star Carnival	Newcomer Award	Zhang Mingen	Won	
2017	2nd China Quality Television Drama Ceremony	Weekly Broadcast Drama of the Year	The Mystic Nine	Won	
2017	22nd Huading Awards	Best Actress	Zhao Liying	Won	
2017	22nd Huading Awards	Top 10 Dramas	The Mystic Nine	Won	
2017	Weibo Movie Night Awards	Most Influential Web Movie	The Mystic Nine Side Story: Flowers Bloom in February	Won	
2017	2nd Asia New Media Film Festival	Most Popular Actress (Web film)	Wang Meiren	Won	

== International broadcast ==
Channel	Location	Broadcast start date	Note
Dragon TV	Mainland China	4 July 2016	Monday and Tuesday, 22:00 on Hearty 8 Minutes
iQiYi	Mainland China, Taiwan	4 July 2016	VIP Membership: Monday and Tuesday, 22:00 Nonmembership: Monday, 24:00
Astro Quan Jia HD	Malaysia	16 September 2016	Monday to Friday, 19:00-20:00
CHK HD	Singapore	11 November 2016	Monday to Friday, 22:00
EYE TV DRAMA	Taiwan	20 April 2017	Monday to Friday, 18:00-20:00
China Television	Taiwan	24 April 2017	Monday to Thursday, 23:00
Chung T'ien Television	Taiwan	29 April 2017	Saturday and Sunday, 12:00 on CTi Variety
Talentvision	Canada	19 May 2017	2:00PM,8:30PM / 5:00PM,11:30PM

== Spin-off ==
On October 20, 2016, a side story of the drama was released under the title The Mystic Nine Side Story: Flowers Bloom in February (Chinese: 老九门番外之二月花开; pinyin: Lǎo jiǔ mén fānwài zhī èr yuè huā kāi; lit. 'Old Nine Gates Flowers Bloom in February') as a web film. The web film is a continuation of the television series. Several more internet films were later produced, which focused on the supporting characters' side stories.

- Flowers Bloom in February (二月花开); featuring Er Yuehong
- Tiger Bones Plum Blossom (虎骨梅花); featuring Jie Jiuye
- Four Belongs to Abelmoschus (四屠黄葵); featuring Chenpi Ah Si
- Ganges Killing the Trees (恒河杀树); featuring Huo Jinxi
