= Ultimate Note =

- Traditional Chinese: 終極筆記
- Simplified Chinese: 终极笔记
- Literal meaning: Ultimate Note
- Hanyu Pinyin: zhōng jí bǐ jì
- Genre: mystery supernatural adventurel
- Based on: Daomu Biji by Nan Pai San Shu
- Written by: Zhang Yuanang; Tian Liangliang
- Directed by: Zou Xi; Wei Lizhou
- Starring: Joseph Zeng; Xiao Yuliang; Hankiz Omar; Liu Yuning; Cheng Fangxu
- Country of origin: China
- Original language: Mandarin
- No. of episodes: 37

Production
- Executive producer: Wang Xiaohui
- Producers: Bai Yicong; Li Liying; Gong Yu
- Running time: Varies per episode
- Production companies: iQiyi; H&R Century Union Corporation

Original release
- Network: iQiyi
- Release: 10 December 2020 – 22 January 2021

Related
- The Mystic Nine; Time Raiders; The Lost Tomb; The Lost Tomb 2: Explore with the Note; The Lost Tomb 2: Heavenly Palace on the Clouds; Tibetan Sea Flower; Tomb of the Sea; Reunion: The Sound of the Providence

Ultimate Note (Chinese: 终极笔记; pinyin: zhōng jí bǐ jì) is a 2020 Chinese streaming television series that premiered on iQiyi on December 10, 2020, which tells a story of Wu Xie's adventures after Genting Temple when he received two videos from Zhang Qiling. It is directed by Zou Xi and Wei Lizhou, and features an ensemble cast that includes Joseph Zeng, Xiao Yuliang, Hankiz Omar, Liu Yuning and Cheng Fangxu. The series was adapted from Nan Pai San Shu's novel, Daomu Biji.

== Cast ==
- Joseph Zeng as Wu Xie
- Xiao Yuliang as Zhang Qiling
- Hankiz Omar as A Ning
- Liu Yuning as Hei Yanjing
- Cheng Fangxu as Wang Pangzi
- Fan Ming as Wu Sanxing
- Wang Jinsong as Wu Erbai
- Leanne Liu as Huo Xiangu
- Liu Yuhan as Xie Yuchen
- Liu Ruoyan as Huo Xiuxiu
- Wan Peixin as Pan Zi
