= Mysterious Lotus Casebook (Chinese 2023 series) =

2023 Chinese television series

- Chinese: 安乐传
- Hanyu Pinyin: Liánhuā Lóu
- Genre: Wuxia; Mystery; Detective; Procedural
- Based on: Auspicious Pattern Lotus House (吉祥纹莲花楼) by Teng Ping
- Written by: Liu Fang; Li Huimin; Cheng Yu; Wang Wei
- Directed by: Guo Hu; Ren Haitao
- Starring: Cheng Yi; Zeng Shunxi; Xiao Shunyao; Chen Duling; Wang Herun; Chen Yihan
- Music by: Yan Yidan
- Country of origin: China
- Original language: Mandarin
- No. of episodes: 40 (+ 1 special epilogue)

Production
- Executive producers: Gong Yu; Zhao Zhicheng
- Producer: Deng Xibin
- Cinematography: Shen Shaoxiang
- Editor: Liu Lei
- Production companies: iQIYI; Qiguang Studio; H&R Century Pictures

Original release
- Network: iQIYI; CCTV-8
- Release: 23 July – 18 August 2023

Mysterious Lotus Casebook (Chinese: 莲花楼; pinyin: Liánhuā Lóu) is a 2023 Chinese television series based on the wuxia mystery novel series Auspicious Pattern Lotus House by Teng Ping. Directed by Guo Hu and Ren Haitao and adapted for television by head writer Liu Fang, the series stars Cheng Yi in the title role alongside Zeng Shunxi and Xiao Shunyao, with Chen Duling, Wang Herun, and Chen Yihan in prominent supporting roles.

The narrative follows Li Xiangyi, a peerless martial artist who vanishes following a climactic naval duel against his rival Di Feisheng. Ten years later, he resurfaces under the alias Li Lianhua, an impoverished, ailing physician traveling in a horse-drawn mobile dwelling known as the "Lotus Tower". Alongside an aspiring young detective, Fang Duobing, and his former nemesis, Di Feisheng, he embarks on an investigation of ten bizarre murder mysteries that gradually expose a long-dormant dynastic conspiracy.

The series premiered on iQIYI on 23 July 2023 and began linear television broadcast on CCTV-8 on 6 August 2023. It achieved widespread commercial success and critical acclaim, being noted by domestic media for revitalizing the traditional wuxia genre through its fusion of whodunit forensic deduction with a philosophical narrative centered on self-reconciliation rather than conventional vengeance.

== Premise ==
Ten years prior to the events of the series, the martial arts world (jianghu) was dominated by two opposing factions: the righteous Sigu Sect, led by the prodigy swordsman Li Xiangyi, and the unorthodox Jinyuan Alliance, commanded by Di Feisheng. Following the assassination of Li Xiangyi's senior martial brother Shan Gudao, the two factions clashed in a catastrophic duel on the East Sea. Betrayed by poison from within his own ranks and severely injured, Li Xiangyi fell into the sea alongside Di Feisheng, and both were presumed dead.

In the present day, Li Xiangyi has renounced his past identity. Afflicted by the incurable Bicha Poison, which has severely depleted his lifespan and internal martial energy, he lives as Li Lianhua, a seemingly mild-mannered and eccentric folk healer who resides in the Lotus Tower, a multi-story wooden house on wheels. Li Lianhua's sole initial ambition is to locate the lost remains of Shan Gudao before succumbing to his illness.

His quiet existence is interrupted when he crosses paths with Fang Duobing, an earnest rookie investigator from the Baichuan Court who idolizes the legendary Li Xiangyi without realizing the physician before him is that very man. When Di Feisheng re-emerges and discovers Li Lianhua's identity, the three men form an uneasy alliance. As they investigate ten intricate, seemingly supernatural crimes across the country, they realize the cases are tied to the artifacts of the ancient Nan Yin kingdom and a clandestine organization plotting to overthrow the ruling imperial dynasty.

== Cast and characters ==
=== Main ===
- Cheng Yi as Li Lianhua / Li Xiangyi:
  Formerly the undisputed leader of the Sigu Sect and the supreme swordsman of the martial world. After surviving the East Sea battle, he abandoned his quest for martial supremacy to become a wandering physician who values simple pleasures, cooking, and peace, while accepting his physical decline with grace.
- Zeng Shunxi as Fang Duobing (courtesy name Fang Xiaobao):
  The wealthy heir of the Tianji Hall and a junior investigator for the Baichuan Court. Earnest and determined to uphold justice, he regards Li Xiangyi as his personal mentor and gradually forms a fraternal bond with Li Lianhua.
- Xiao Shunyao as Di Feisheng:
  The martial-obsessed former supreme leader of the Jinyuan Alliance. Driven by an unyielding code of personal honor rather than political ambition, he desires only a fair duel with Li Xiangyi at full health and repeatedly aids him in unraveling the central conspiracy.

=== Supporting ===
==== Baichuan Court and Sigu Sect ====
- Chen Duling as Qiao Wanmian:
  Li Xiangyi's former lover. After spending ten years grieving his death, she eventually seeks to move forward with her life and marries Xiao Zijin, though she continues to honor Xiangyi's memory.
- Huang Youming as Xiao Zijin:
  A high-ranking elder of the Sigu Sect and Li Xiangyi's former sworn brother. Despite assuming leadership of the reformed sect, his deep-seated jealousy toward Xiangyi persists.
- Yu Bo as Ji Hanfo:
  Chief arbitrator of the Baichuan Court and former deputy leader of the Sigu Sect.
- Lu Hong as Yun Biqiu:
  An elder of the Baichuan Court who poisoned Li Xiangyi ten years earlier after being manipulated by Jiao Liqiao, living under profound guilt.
- Wu Shile as Shi Shui:
  An upright, uncompromising female leader within the Baichuan Court who remains loyal to Li Xiangyi's legacy.

==== Jinyuan Alliance and Wan Sheng Dao ====
- Wang Herun as Jiao Liqiao:
  The manipulative and ruthless holy maiden of the Jinyuan Alliance. Harboring an unrequited, obsessive infatuation with Di Feisheng, she covertly collaborates with external factions to eliminate anyone who threatens her influence.
- Xu Baohua as Shan Gudao:
  Li Xiangyi's senior martial brother whose alleged death originally sparked the East Sea conflict. He is later revealed to be the covert founder of the subversive Wan Sheng Dao organization.
- Zhao Wenzhuo as Feng Qing:
  The grand protector of the Wan Sheng Dao who coordinates the retrieval of the Luomo Keys.

==== Others ====
- Chen Yihan as Su Xiaoyong:
  An agile and resourceful descendant of the Tianji Hall and granddaughter of physician Su Boyan, who harbors romantic feelings for Li Lianhua and assists his inquiries with forensic records.
- He Zhonghua as the Emperor
- Liu Mengrui as Princess Zhaoling:
  An imperial princess who forms a comedic and romantic bond with Fang Duobing.

== Episodes and story arcs ==
The 40 episodes of the series are structured around ten distinct mystery investigations that gradually connect to the central overarching plot:

Story arcs and investigation cases in Mysterious Lotus Casebook
Arc	Episode(s)	Case title	Core investigation and narrative development
1	1–3	The Golden Body of Lingshan (灵山识童)	Li Lianhua and Fang Duobing encounter each other while investigating the apparent supernatural reincarnation of the deceased leader of the Lingshan Sect, exposing a fraudulent succession scheme and marking the formation of their partnership.
2	3–6	The Ghost of Jade City (玉城案)	At a remote mountain outpost, the trio investigates the murder of the second young mistress of Jade City alongside a series of decapitated bodies, revealing familial infidelity, a locked-room homicide, and the re-emergence of Jinyuan Alliance agents.
3	7–10	The First-Rank Tomb (一品坟)	A subterranean expedition into the heavily booby-trapped royal mausoleum of Emperor Fangyi. Di Feisheng joins the fray, obtaining the restorative Gu worm and discovering that Li Lianhua is the surviving Li Xiangyi.
4	11–13	The Cursed Bridal Gown of Cailian Manor (采莲庄嫁衣案)	Three brides at Cailian Manor drown under identical circumstances while dressed in the same ancestral wedding gown. Li Lianhua uncovers hidden mirror chambers and botanical neurotoxins while searching for clues to Shan Gudao's body.
5	14–16	Buddhist Chants and the Missing Remains (经声佛火)	The search for Shan Gudao's physical remains leads to Pudu Temple. Li Lianhua confronts former companions of the Sigu Sect, confirming that Shan Gudao's body was modified and that his demise was staged.
6	17–20	The Doctors' Gathering at Yuanbao Manor (元宝山庄名医会诊)	Renowned physicians gather at Yuanbao Manor to treat an incurable illness affecting the master of the manor. A locked-room murder prompts an investigation that yields the Bomei Human-Skin Map and the second Luomo Key.
7	21–24	The Women's Quarters Assassination (女宅案)	In an isolated valley manor, an abusive and reclusive warlord is mysteriously slain and dismembered during an elaborate banquet. Li Lianhua deduces that the captive women collectively planned the execution, highlighting themes of mutual protection.
8	25–28	The Puppet Village of Shishou (石寿村丧尸案)	Investigating an abandoned, mist-covered village whose inhabitants have mutated into feral living puppets. The team uncovers biological experimentation with Nan Yin parasitic worms orchestrated by Wan Sheng Dao.
9	29–32	The King of Hell's Wedding in Xiaoliancheng (小连城阎王娶亲)	Serial disappearances of young women staged as supernatural brides lead the trio into the fortress of Xiaoliancheng, where the final Luomo Key is recovered and the identity of Shan Gudao as the living leader of Wan Sheng Dao is unmasked.
10	33–40	The Tower of Bliss in the Imperial Palace (皇宫极乐塔案 / 大结局)	The final confrontation shifts to the imperial capital, where Shan Gudao initiates a coup d'état claiming rightful royal bloodline through the lost Nan Yin dynasty. Li Lianhua reveals the true royal lineage, neutralizing the rebellion at great personal cost to his remaining lifespan.

== Production ==
=== Development and writing ===
The project was developed over approximately four years by iQIYI and production company H&R Century Pictures. Adaptors led by head writer Liu Fang significantly modified Teng Ping's source novel, which was an anthology of independent murder investigations. To create a continuous narrative suitable for television, the writers introduced the Nan Yin imperial conspiracy and the four "Luomo Keys" as unifying plot devices linking each case to Li Xiangyi's past.

=== Filming and design ===
Principal photography lasted 134 days, commencing on 26 June 2022 at Hengdian World Studios and concluding in late October 2022. The art department designed and constructed nearly 400 distinct interior and exterior sets, including a fully functional, mobile multi-tiered wooden carriage for the Lotus Tower. Action directors emphasized traditional wuxia wirework and grounded swordplay techniques over heavy visual effects to evoke the aesthetic of late-20th-century martial arts cinema.

=== Music ===
The original score and soundtrack were supervised and composed by singer-songwriter Yan Yidan.

Mysterious Lotus Casebook: Original Television Soundtrack
No.	Title	Lyrics	Music	Performer(s)
1	"In the Jianghu" (就在江湖之上) (Opening theme)	Yan Yidan	Yan Yidan, Gan Hu	Liu Yuning
2	"The World is in Too Much of a Rush" (人世太匆忙) (Ending theme)	Yan Yidan	Yan Yidan, Ji Yuan	Yan Yidan
3	"A Pot of Lotus Wine" (一壶莲花醉) (Insert song)	Yan Yidan	Yan Yidan, Ji Yuan	Hu Xia
4	"Unfinished" (未完) (Insert song)	Yan Yidan	Yan Yidan, Ji Yuan	Xiao Shunyao

== Broadcast and distribution ==
The series was released for VIP subscribers on iQIYI on 23 July 2023, accompanied by simultaneous global streaming via the iQIYI International platform across 191 territories with multilingual subtitles. On 6 August 2023, the program began broadcast in prime time on terrestrial and cable network CCTV-8, followed by multiple subsequent reruns across satellite television channels including Guangdong TV. In response to fan debate regarding the series' ending, iQIYI released an additional five-minute special epilogue depicting an open-ended encounter on a seashore.

== Reception ==
=== Commercial performance ===
During its broadcast, Mysterious Lotus Casebook became the tenth television series in iQIYI's platform history—and the third in 2023—to surpass the 10,000 threshold on the platform's internal Content Popularity Index. On linear television, national ratings tracked by China Video Broadcasters (CVB) on CCTV-8 consistently exceeded 1.0% in prime time. In post-broadcast streaming metrics, the series demonstrated notable long-tail viewership, achieving an average of over 100 million effective views per episode across aggregated Chinese online video platforms.

=== Critical response and themes ===
The series was met with positive critical appraisal from domestic media. A review by Xinhua News Agency described the show as an important evolution in the historical television landscape, praising its de-emphasis of conventional romantic melodrama in favor of intellectual procedural deduction and ensemble camaraderie.

Cultural analysts writing in China Daily highlighted the work's distinctive subversion of wuxia heroism. Unlike traditional narratives focused on achieving martial dominance, obtaining vengeance, or regaining lost status, the central journey of Li Xiangyi is characterized by voluntary detachment, self-reconciliation, and the courage to accept personal mortality and ordinary life. On the media review platform Douban, the series holds a rating of 8.5 out of 10 based on more than 500,000 user reviews, ranking among the highest-rated domestic wuxia television dramas of the 2020s.

== Accolades ==
Awards and nominations received by Mysterious Lotus Casebook
Year	Award	Category	Nominee(s)	Result	Ref.
2023	iQIYI Scream Night	Drama of the Year (10,000 Popularity Club)	Mysterious Lotus Casebook	Won	
2023	Weibo TV & Internet Video Summit	Outstanding Drama of the Year	Mysterious Lotus Casebook	Won	
2024	29th Shanghai Television Festival (Magnolia Awards)	Best Adapted Screenplay	Liu Fang, Li Huimin, Cheng Yu, Wang Wei	Nominated	
