= Zeng Shunxi =

Chinese actor and singer (born 1997)

- Born: 9 October 1997 (age 28); Shenzhen, Guangdong, China
- Occupations: Actor; singer
- Years active: 2014–present
- Agent: iQIYI

Chinese name
- Chinese: 曾舜晞
Transcriptions
Standard Mandarin
- Hanyu Pinyin: Zēng Shùnxī

Zeng Shunxi (Chinese: 曾舜晞; pinyin: Zēng Shùnxī, born October 9, 1997), also known as Joseph Zeng, is a Chinese actor and singer.

== Career ==
Zeng debuted as part of the boy group Fresh Teenager Geek in 2014; he left in 2015 to pursue solo acting activities. He made his acting debut in the comedy drama Happy Mitan in 2016. The same year, he made his film debut in the action film Out of Control.

Zeng gained recognition for his role as Tang Thirty-Six in the fantasy action drama Fighter of the Destiny. He then played lead roles in the youth dramas When We Were Young and Take My Brother Away.

In 2019, Zeng played the role of Zhang Wuji in the wuxia television series Heavenly Sword and Dragon Slaying Saber, based on the novel of the same name by Jin Yong. The same year, he starred in the family drama Over the Sea I Come to You playing the role of Sun Honglei's son.

== Filmography ==
=== Film ===
Year	English title	Chinese title	Role	Notes/Ref.
2017	Out of Control	失控·幽灵飞车	Bobby Fang	
2017	Fantastica: A Boonie Bears Adventure	熊出没·奇幻空间	Boss	Voice-dubbed

=== Television series ===
Year	English title	Chinese title	Role	Notes/Ref.
2016	Happy Mitan	欢喜密探	Zheng Xiaohua	
2017	Fighter of the Destiny	择天记	Tang Thirty-six	
2017	When We Were Young	青春最好时	Xu Konglin	
2018	Take My Brother Away	快把我哥带走	Shi Fen	
2019	Heavenly Sword and Dragon Slaying Saber	倚天屠龙记	Zhang Wuji	
2019	Over the Sea I Come to You	带着爸爸去留学	Huang Xiadong	
2020	The Journey Across the Night	我在香港遇见他	Li Jia	
2020	Ultimate Note	终极笔记	Wu Xie	
2020	Line Walker 3	使徒行者3	Yan Tin-hap / Madman	
2021	Time Flies and You Are Here	雁归西窗月	Zhao Xiaoqian	
2021	Mystery of Antiques III	古董局中局3：掠宝清单	Liu Ye	
2021	Rebirth For You	嘉南传	Li Qian	
2022	Heroes	说英雄谁是英雄	Wang Xiaoshi	
2022	Hi Venus	我可能遇到了救星	Lu Zhaoxi	
2023	Meet Yourself	去有风的地方	Zhang Mingyu	
2023	Hi Producer	正好遇见你	Zhu Jianshen	
2023	Mysterious Lotus Casebook	莲花楼	Fang Duobing / Fang Xiaobao	
2023	My Journey to You	云之羽	Adult Xue Tongzi	Cameo
2023	Romance on the Farm	田耕纪	Shen Nuo / Shen Yi	
2024	A Lonely Hero's Journey	孤舟	Gu Yizhong	
2024	Snowy Night Timeless Love	七夜雪	Huo Zhanbai	
2025	Perfect Match	五福临门	Song Renzong	Guest role
2025	Feud	临江仙	Bai Jiusi	
2025	Justice Is Mine	绝命法官	Han Lie / Hon Lit	
2026	Veil of Shadows	月鳞绮纪	Wu Shiguang / Cang Hao	
2026	The Legend of Rosy Clouds	云秀行	Qi Zheng	
2026	The Mystic Nine II	九门	Wu Laogou	
TBA	Ctrl+Alt+Life	奇换人生	Mars	
TBA	Inverted Fate	攻玉	Lin Chengyou	
TBA	The Journey Across the Night 2	我在香港遇见他2	Li Jia	

=== Television show ===
Year	English title	Chinese title	Role	Notes/Ref.
2016	Sisters Over Flowers	花样姐姐	Cast member	

== Discography ==
=== Singles ===
Year	English title	Chinese title	Album	Notes/Ref.
2016	"Morning Call"	早安少年	Sisters Over Flowers OST	
2017	"Thank You"	谢你		
2018	"Eden"	乐园	Take My Brother Away OST	
2019	"Starry Sea"	星辰大海		For China Movie Channel Young Actors Project with 31 other actors
2020	"Because of You"	因为你	Ultimate Note OST	

== Awards and nominations ==
Year	Award	Category	Nominated work	Results	Ref.
2015	OK! The Style Awards	Fashion Newcomer Award	—N/a	Won	
2016	OK! The Style Awards	Most Commercially Valuable Idol	—N/a	Won	
2017	Weibo Fashion Awards	Popular New Actor Award	—N/a	Won	
2018	12th Tencent Video Star Awards	Most Promising TV Actor	—N/a	Won	
2019	6th The Actors of China Award Ceremony	Best Actor (Web series)	Heavenly Sword and Dragon Slaying Saber	Won	
2019	26th Huading Awards	Best Newcomer	Heavenly Sword and Dragon Slaying Saber	Nominated	
2019	Golden Bud - The Fourth Network Film And Television Festival	Best Actor	Heavenly Sword and Dragon Slaying Saber, Over the Sea I Come to You	Nominated	
2019	Golden Bud - The Fourth Network Film And Television Festival	Most Popular Actor	Heavenly Sword and Dragon Slaying Saber, Over the Sea I Come to You	Won	
2019	China Entertainment Industry Summit (Golden Pufferfish Awards)	Most Promising Commercially Valuable Artist	—N/a	Won	
2019	Sina Fashion Awards	Quality Artist of the Year	—N/a	Won	
2019	iFeng Fashion Choice Awards	Fashion Attitude of the Year	—N/a	Won	
2020	Golden Lion Advertising Awards	Best Actor	Thirty	Won	

== Other activities ==
=== Philanthropy ===
In April 2020, he lent his voice to the charity project "ONE NIGHT for Children" which cares for special children.

In July 2021, Zeng donated 500,000 yuan to disaster relief efforts for the rainstorm disaster in Henan.

=== Endorsements ===
May 9, 2024, it was announced that Zeng has become the spokesperson for Coach fragrance in Greater China and launched the first brand endorsement advertising blockbuster. On May 13, Zeng became the first spokesperson for the Chinese skincare brand HBN. On June 8, Saucony Originals officially announced Zeng as the brand's "Millennium Series" spokesperson.
