= Fighter of the Destiny =

Chinese television series

- Official Poster
- Genre: Fantasy; Adventure; Romance; Xianxia
- Based on: Way of Choices by Mao Ni
- Directed by: Zhong Shujia
- Starring: Lu Han; Gulnazar; Janice Wu; Zeng Shunxi
- Country of origin: China
- Original language: Chinese
- No. of seasons: 1
- No. of episodes: 52

Production
- Running time: 45 minutes
- Production companies: Tencent Media, Limon Pictures, Yuewen Media
- Budget: US$58 million

Original release
- Network: Hunan TV
- Release: 17 April – 1 June 2017

Fighter of the Destiny (Chinese: 择天记) is a 2017 Chinese television series adapted from the novel of the same name by Mao Ni. It stars Lu Han, Gulnazar, Janice Wu and Zeng Shunxi. The series aired on Hunan TV from 17 April to 1 June 2017.

== Synopsis ==
In the beginning, there were three races; man, demons and beasts. A battle for supremacy happened between man and demons. Emperor Taizhong of Zhou passed on during this war and his wife took over as Empress. With the Astrolobe created by Zhou Dufu, she tried desperately to fight off the invading demonic army. Unfortunately, the race of man almost lost as the demon race managed to engaged the help of a Frost dragon. In desperation, the Empress sacrificed her young prince to the Astrolobe in order to draw the energies from the stars to fight the invading army and the dragon. Human clan won the battle, and the invading demonic army was forced to retreat back to their territory.

Few years after the war, Xu Taizai took his granddaughter, Xu Yourong and search for treatment for her, as her Phoenix blood was going out of control, and thus slowly killing her. However, they were chased by demon assassins who wanted her life. Fortunately, they were rescued by a young boy, Chen Changsheng and his Senior Brother, Yu Ren, who were plucking medical herbs nearby. Changsheng was made aware that his blood is able to cure all poisons and illnesses. This is at the expenses of his own mortality. He saved her disregarding his own life and their fate was bonded then. Changsheng's master who adopted him, explained that he was destined to be unable to live past the age of 20 due to his blood. Unwilling to give up on his own destiny, he is determined to find the note left by Zhou Dufu, that is said to consist the way of changing one's destiny. However, the note resides in the Lingxu Pavilion, which has become a restricted location in Shendu City. The only chance for Chen Changsheng to reach the Lingxu Pavilion is to be in the first place in Imperial exam that is held only once in three years. Changsheng sets out for the capital to take the exam and thus begins the rise of a hero for Zhou Dynasty.

== Cast ==
=== Main ===
- Lu Han as Chen ChangSheng
  - He was created by the Pope and Taoist Ji using Yu Ren and Taizhong's blood, as a vessel to bring the downfall of the Divine Empress. The Divine Empress and the Pope had noted that he resembles the young Emperor Taizhong. His blood possesses the "forces of star"; it can cure all injuries and illnesses, but would cost him his health. He places first in the Imperial Examinations and becomes the principal of Guojiao Academy. He has an arranged marriage with Xu Yourong, whom he loves. He is destined to not live past the age of 20. Therefore, he came to Sacred Capital (Shendu) in order to find Zhou Dufu's note that can help him change his destiny.
- Gülnezer Bextiyar as Xu Yourong (Rong 'Er)
  - An saintess who possesses the blood of the phoenix. She met and fell in love with Chen Changsheng since they were young, after he saved her life. However, she tries to hold her feelings back as her cultivation method doesn't allow her to fall in love with anyone except for Qiushan Jun, who has the blood of the dragon and can protect her from getting a backlash. Eventually, she decides to submit to her feelings for Changsheng, and sides with him on every occasion.
- Janice Wu as Bai Luoheng (Luo Luo)
  - The beautiful, cute, and stubborn princess of the beast clan. She takes Chen Changsheng as her teacher after witnessing his intelligence, and later developed an unrequited love for him. She becomes a Goddess to save Chen Changsheng, and was forced to forget her feelings for him, even with her forgotten emotions, she helped to save the world.
- Zeng Shunxi as Tang Thirty-Six (Tang Tang)
  - The sole heir of Tang family and a loyal friend of Chen Changsheng. He fell in love with Mo Yu, whom he constantly bickers with and eventually marries.
- Xu Lingyue as Mo Yu
  - The head royal attendant of the Empress, and good friend of Xu Yourong. She has a prejudice against Chen Changsheng and even going as far as trying to kill him. She eventually accepts Chen Changsheng as a match for Xu Yourong. She falls in love with Tang Thirty-Six. After their wedding, she goes to fight against the Pope and is almost killed, but is saved by her husband. However, she is permanently paralyzed.
- Johnny Zhang as Qiushan Jun
  - Senior disciple of Li Shan Sword sect, who possesses the blood of the dragon. He has an unrequited love for Xu Yourong. He later becomes an accomplice of the demon tribe due to the demon seed Nanke planted in him. He dies saving Xu Yourong from the Pope.
- Gao Hanyu as Xuanyuan Po
  - A rather naive, but hot-blooded warrior of the Bear tribe who befriends Chen Changsheng. He serves Luo Luo after she saved him from death, and later falls into an unrequited love with her.
- Lin Siyi as Little Black Dragon (Zhu Sha)
  - During the war between human clan and demon clan, she colluded with the demon to defeat humans to avenge her father, who was killed by Zhou Dufu. After the humans claimed victory, she was imprisoned by the Divine Empress under the Beixin Bridge of a frost lake. She eventually meets Chen Changsheng, who gained her trust after providing her with delicious food. Chen Changsheng eventually frees her from her prison. In return, she often helps and saves Chen Changsheng and his allies.

=== Supporting ===
==== People of Da Zhou ====
- Chen Shu as Divine Empress, Mother of Chen Changsheng. Her real name is Tianhai Youxue. Her blood possesses the power of the phoenix. She is later betrayed by Han Qing, and receives a fatal blow from him, which causes her death.
- Eric Tsang as Taoist Ji/Shang Xingzhou
  - Chen Changsheng's teacher and the former head advisor of Guojiao Academy. He is also a senior of the Pope back then where they're studying at Guojiao Academy. He rebels against the Divine Empress before disappearing with the prince. He reappears after 19 years, only to have a change of mind and finally addressed the Empress as 'Your Majesty' in her last moments.
- Eddie Cheung as Pope (Yin Xingdao)
  - One of the five holy reverents who reached the highest cultivation. He is also Red Robe, the mysterious leader of hidden snake, who plots to overthrow the Divine Empress, as well as destroy the Demon clan and rule over the Beast tribes. In the end, he is killed in the Astrolabe Formation's destruction.
- Xue Jianing as Moyu's mother
  - The Divine Empress's previous royal attendant; She died shortly after saving the prince from being sacrificed to the Astrolabe formation.
- Zhai Tianlin as Zhou Dufu
  - One of the five holy reverent who have reached the highest cultivation. He is also the murderer behind the death of Little Black Dragon's father. It is unknown either he is dead or his nascent soul is residing in other dimension. He eventually meet Chen Changsheng as a result of the latter's journey in changing his destiny.
- He Zhonghua as Divine Emperor (Chen Taizhong)
  - He once ruled over the Sacred Capital and the Human Tribe, and died shortly before the war between the human clan and demon clan. He was married to the Divine Empress and good friends with the Pope. He also father of Chen Changsheng.
- Qu Zheming as Tianhai Ya'er
  - The Divine Empress's nephew. An arrogant and careless man who abuses his authority. He dislikes Chen Changsheng and constantly tries to ruin his reputation. He has an unrequited love toward Mo Yu. He is killed by Youyi Hair Clasp by the Empress during the Tianhai's attempt to assassinate her.
- Feng Lijun as Gou Hanshi
  - Senior disciple of Li Shan Sword sect. He is loyal and upright. He likes Qi Jian, and looks up to Qiushan Jun. He is presumed dead after being attacked by Nan Ke and Qiushan Jun.
- You Jingru as Qi Jian
  - Disciple of Li Shan sword sect. She is kind-hearted and innocent. After she was saved by Chen Changsheng from getting killed by a bewitched Qiushan Jun in Zhou Garden, he gained her trust and helped the Guojiao students to escape many times.
- Quan Peilun as Guan Feibai
  - Disciple of Li Shan Sword sect, who ranked number four on the Qing Yun Hall. He was killed by a possessed Qiushan Jun in the Zhou Garden. Changsheng was framed by Qiushan Jun and Zhuang Huanyu of killing him.
- Zhou Kaikai as Ning Qiu
- Zhang Meiyang as Shu Cui
- Fu Jia as Yu Ren / Prince Minyang
  - Chen Changsheng's senior and childhood friend. He is actually the crown prince of the human race named Prince Minyang, the only son of the Divine Emperor and the Divine Empress. His blood that carries power of the galaxy had been transferred into Chen Changsheng's body by Taoist Ji. He was crowned as the Emperor after the Pope's demise.
- Ren Shan as Tianhai Cheng Wu
  - Tianhai Ya'er's father and the Empress's older brother. He was brainwashed by Red Robes and attempted to assassinate the Divine Empress. He was later killed by the Divine Empress after the assassination of the Divine Empress failed.
- Bai Xiang as Clergy Xin, Lecturer of Li Palace.
- Liu Kaifei as Zhou Yuren, Zhou Dufu's sister.
- Xiao Yuliang as Zhuang Huanyu
  - Senior disciple of Tian Dao Academy, who ranked number eleven on the Qing Yun Hall. He likes Luo Luo and dislikes Chen Changsheng. He is later killed by the Pope while defending Tang Thirty-Six.
- Zhao Zhi-wei as Huo Guang
  - Disciple of Tian Dao Academy. He was killed by the Demon Tribe and Chen Changsheng was framed of killing him as he is found dead in front of Guojiao Academy.
- Ren Hao as Su Moyu
- Maggie Shiu as Xun Mei
  - An extraordinary expert who once ranked number one on the National Examinations 39 years ago. She was killed when she tried to challenge Han Qing, the guardian of Tian Shu Ling.
- Nan Fulong as Wang Po
  - The number one expert of Qing Yun Hall; Xun Mei's good friend. He died 39 years ago in the battle between the humans and the Demon tribe.
- Wang Gang as Tang Qiu
  - Tang Thirty-Six's father. When the deal between the Tang family and the demon clan was discovered, he denies any connection with Tang Thirty-Six and claimed that he has nothing to do with him as an attempt to save his only son from getting punished.
- Zhang Jiading as Tang Hai
  - Tang Qiu's adopted son and Tang Thirty-Six's adopted brother. He is secretly aligned with the Demon tribe.
- Wang Maolei as Zhou Tong
- Guo Luoyu as General Han Qing / Jin Midi
  - Da Zhou's invincible warrior; Guardian of Tian Shu Ling. Former crown prince of the Demon Kingdom with the name Jin Midi, also the elder brother of Nan Ke. He later kill the Divine Empress as he is promised to be Demon Clan's king.
- He Qiang as Xu Taizai
  - Xu Yourong's grandfather. A wise and quick-witted man as stated by the Empress. He arranged the engagement between Xu Yourong and Chen Changsheng as a way to express gratitude after he saved his granddaughter.
- Tong Tong as Madame Xu
  - Xu Yourong's mother. An arrogant woman who valued materiality. She disagrees Changsheng and Yourong's engagement that was made by Yurong's grandfather.
- Lu Zhong as Xu Weixin
  - Xu Yourong's father. Invincible warrior of Dong Yu. Later killed by the Pope when he tried to kill the Pope to save his daughter. His corpse was hung at the Sacred Capital's gate as a trap to lure Xu Yourong into saving him.
- Yu Yang as Shuang'er, Xu Yourong's loyal attendant.
- Guo Jiaruo as Ji Jin, White Robe's attendant, who live in Tian Shu Ling.
- Wang Boqing as Xue Xingchuan
- Liang Yunshu as Liu Xiaoyun
- Wuze Jinxi as Medicine Pot Child
  - A spirit who evolved from Zhou Dufu's medicine furnace. He appears as a child and caught Changsheng and Yourong when they were lost at the Pill Furnace Peak, located in a demon territory. He tried to turn Changsheng and Yourong (and everything or everyone he found) into medicine. After he was tricked by the duo, he became obedient to Changsheng and Yourong, and even willing to help Yourong in making Cultivation Elixir as Changsheng's medicine.
- Zu Huai as Chen Liuwang
  - The only member of the Chen Royal that was spared by the Tianhai. He served as a minister in Shendu.
- ?? as Yeshi Huwen
  - One of the survivors of the Guojiao Academy battle. He was abducted by Xuan Youzi and saved by Chen Changsheng and Xu Yourong 30 years later. But soon afterwards, he was killed by Nan Ke.
- ?? as Nie Ying
  - A locksmith expert and the Chen Royals' locksmith. He is the only one who knows the location of the key to Zhou Garden. He is later killed by the Demon Tribe.

==== Demon tribe ====
- Yao Di as Nanke
  - The princess of the Demon tribe who possess the blood of peacock. She is obsessively in love with Qiushan Jun. She despise Xu Yourong a lot.
- Li Chao as Black Robes
  - Military strategist of the Demon tribe. The younger sister of Zhou Dufu, manipulated by Red Robes. She wanted to take back the formation created by her older brother and avenge him. In the end, Black Robes went to die along with the formation's destruction, saying that she's coming to join her older brother.
- Eddie Cheung as Red Robes
  - The leader of Fu She. A mysterious man who worked with Black Robes to topple the Divine Empress's reign. It is later revealed that his true identity is the Pope of Li Palace.
- Bai Haitao as Xuan Youzi
  - One of the North Dipper Seven Murder. He imposes himself as part of the Bear clan and was killed by Qiushan Jun.
- ?? as You Zhu, One of the North Dipper Seven Murder.
- ?? as Yuan Fei, One of the North Dipper Seven Murder. Later killed by Bai Empress.
- ?? as Xuan Ming, One of the North Dipper Seven Murder. She specialize in imposing anyone.
- Ji Li as Lian, One of the North Dipper Seven Murder.
- Xu Jiawan as No Face, One of the North Dipper Seven Murder.
- Wu Yajun as Qin Lu, One of the North Dipper Seven Murder.

==== Beast clan ====
- Archie Kao as Jin Yulü
  - Luo Luo's uncle and caretaker. He is later killed by Red Robe while trying to save Luo Luo and Chen Changsheng.
- Wang Ce as White Emperor, Luo Luo's father.
- Gong Beibi as White Empress, Luo Luo's mother.
- Gao Yang as Protector of the Beast Clan
  - Goddess at the beast clan's temple. Predecessor of Luo Luo. She gave Luo Luo a month to cherish her memories before turning into Goddess.
- Hao Shuai as Xiao De, Invincible and proud general of the Beast Clan. He inherits the White Emperor's magic skills and wishes to marry Luo Luo in order to ascend the throne.

== Soundtrack ==
Fighter of the Destiny Original Soundtrack
No.	Title	Music	Length
1.	"Stars (星辰)"	Jason Zhang	4:10
2.	"Fated (注定)"	Bibi Zhou and Bai Jugang	4:02
3.	"Book with No Words(无字天书)"	Yisa Yu
4.	"Love and Wish Goes Against (爱与愿违)"	Zhang Xianzi

== Reception ==
The series has been panned by critics for its poor acting performance from the two young leads, and has also been criticized for not adhering closely enough to the original story. Nonetheless, it is popular among many young viewers. The series placed first among audience ratings in its time slot and received over 27 billion views online on all major streaming sites, becoming one of the most watched Chinese television series of all time. The success is attributed to the "Lu Han" effect, which refers to the idol's massive influence among his followers. In January 2018, the series reached 30 billion views.

=== Ratings ===
- Highest ratings are marked in red, lowest ratings are marked in blue

Air date	Episode	CSM52 city network ratings	CSM National Network ratings
Air date	Episode	Ratings (%)	Ratings (%)
April 17, 2017	1-2	1.041	0.67
April 18, 2017	3-4	1.08	0.72
April 19, 2017	5-6	1.024	0.66
April 20, 2017	7-8	1.051	0.64
April 24, 2017	9-10	1.096	0.70
April 25, 2017	11-12	1.071	0.71
April 26, 2017	13-14	1.106	0.81
April 27, 2017	15-16	1.153	0.87
May 1, 2017	17-18	1.017	0.87
May 2, 2017	19-20	0.926	0.83
May 3, 2017	21-22	1.022	0.82
May 4, 2017	23-24	0.976	0.85
May 8, 2017	25-26	1.075	0.84
May 9, 2017	27-28	1.075	0.92
May 10, 2017	29-30	0.962	0.84
May 11, 2017	31-32	1.192	0.88
May 15, 2017	33-34	1.248	0.93
May 16, 2017	35-36	1.298	0.96
May 17, 2017	37-38	1.130	1.08
May 18, 2017	39-40	1.298	1.08
May 22, 2017	41-42	1.095	0.80
May 23, 2017	43-44	1.178	0.91
May 24, 2017	45-46	0.905	0.97
May 25, 2017	47-48	1.185	0.90
May 29, 2017	49-50	1.430	1.65
May 30, 2017	51-52	1.139	0.94
May 31, 2017	53-54	1.255	1.21
June 1, 2017	55-56	1.303	1.19
Average ratings		1.12	0.9

== Changes ==
While the series was originally supposed to be 55 episodes, the number of episodes was later reduced to 52 episodes. This because a major character of the drama had to be cut just prior to the airing of the show, as he was portrayed by Gu Hyun Ho, a Korean bodybuilder and model. This is due to China's ban on South Korean media, as a result of South Korea's agreement to host US missile defense system known as THAAD (Terminal High Altitude Area Defense system), which China considers a severe threat to its security interests.
