= The Lost Tomb =

- Promotional poster
- Also known as: Grave Robbers Chronicles; Grave Robbery Note
- Genre: Action; Adventure; Mystery; Supernatural
- Based on: Daomu Biji by Nanpai Sanshu
- Written by: Bai Yicong
- Directed by: Cheang Pou-soi; Law Wing-cheong
- Starring: Li Yifeng; Tiffany Tang; Yang Yang; Liu Tianzuo; Ken Chang; Wei Wei
- Country of origin: China
- Original language: Mandarin
- No. of episodes: 10 + 2 pilot episode

Production
- Production location: China
- Cinematography: Wang Yongheng; Zhang Wenbao
- Running time: 45–47 minutes
- Production companies: H&R Century Pictures; Enlight Media Group
- Budget: ¥500 million

Original release
- Network: iQiyi; Viki
- Release: 12 June 2015

Related
- The Mystic Nine; Time Raiders; The Lost Tomb 2: Explore with the Note; The Lost Tomb 2: Heavenly Palace on the Clouds; Ultimate Note; Tibetan Sea Flower; Tomb of the Sea; Reunion: The Sound of the Providence; Conjuring Curse

The Lost Tomb (Chinese: 盗墓笔记; pinyin: Dàomù Bǐjì) is a 2015 Chinese streaming television series based on the web novel Daomu Biji. The series was originally intended to have 8 seasons filmed over a period of 8 years but only three seasons were produced as of 2020. The first season premiered on iQiyi on 12 June 2015.

== Synopsis ==
Wu Xie (Li Yifeng) is an antique shop owner who comes from a family of tomb raiders. As he continues the family trade with his team of tomb raiders, he finds lost treasures of the Warring States as well as the answers to the tragedies of his family's past. With the help of his grandfather's notes and his team – the quiet Zhang Qiling (Yang Yang), the resourceful Pang Zi (Liu Tianzuo), the experienced Wu Sanxing (Ken Chang), San Xing's loyal helper Pan Zi (Wei Wei), and the skillful Ah Ning (Tiffany Tang) – Wu Xie sets out to find the lost treasures as well as the people responsible for the massacre of his family.

== Cast ==
=== Main ===
Actor	Role	Introduction
Li Yifeng	Wu Xie (Wú Xié; 吴邪)	Owner of an antique store in Hangzhou, China. He finds a map to an ancient tomb in an ancient scroll from the Warring States one day which leads him to seek out the tomb in the map. Wu Xie is an innocent and naive character who is loyal to his friends. He is also the descendant of the 5th Master of the Mystic Nine.
Tiffany Tang	A'ning (Ā'níng; 阿宁)	A grave-robber and the first major female introduced in the series, her motives are unclear but seems to be working against the protagonists.
Yang Yang	Kylin / Xiaoge (Zhāng Qǐlíng; 张起灵 / Little Master)	A mysterious character whose rarely speaks and always seems to be in a daze. He is often hired as an assistant to many grave-robbing endeavors and is highly competent at it; very little is known about him, even his real name.
Liu Tianzuo	Fatty / Pangzi (Wáng Pàngzi; 王胖子)	Nicknamed "Gold Getting Xiao Wei", he is a northern grave-robber (as opposed to Wu Xie, from the south) and teams up with both Wu and Zhang throughout the story; together they are referred to as the "Unbreakable Trio."
Ken Chang	Wu Sanxing / Third Uncle (Wú Sānxǐng; 吴三省)	Wu Xie's third uncle, has a keen interest in tombs and antiques. He joins the group to locate the tomb under the request of his nephew, Wu Xie.
Wei Wei	Pan Zi (Pān Zi; 潘子)	Wu Sanxing's assistant. Sansheng's right-hand man, who had served in the Vietnam War prior to becoming a grave-robber.

=== Supporting ===
Actor	Role	Introduction
Li Chenhao	Master High	Wu Xie's friend, an overseas returnee who is an expert at advanced technology.
Sun Yaoqi	Chen Chengcheng	Qiu Dekao's subordinate. She disguises herself as the niece of Chen Wenjin to get close to Wu Xie.
Cheng Pei-pei	Huo Xiangu	One of the members of mystic nine clan.
Ying Er	Huo Xiuxiu	Huo Xiangu's granddaughter.
Li Xinliang	Liu Tai	
Zhang Xiaochen	Jie Yuchen	
Lu Xingyu	Minister Lu	
Su Qing	Yao Guang	
Huang Ming	King Lushang	

== Production ==
In June 2014, a press conference was held at Shanghai and attended by representatives of H&R Century Pictures, Beijing Enlight Media and Nanpai Investment. It was announced that a film, television series and online game would be adapted from the novel Daomu Biji by Nanpai Sanshu. In particular, the television series would be divided into 8 seasons filmed over a period of 8 years.

The series is directed by Cheang Pou-soi who directed the 2014 film The Monkey King. Other notable production crew included Hong Kong Film Award-winners Angie Lam and Bill Lui. Chun Hung Mak, who worked on the Chinese Paladin series, composed the soundtrack of the series.

Principal photography commenced in August 2014 and wrapped up on 30 November 2014 at Yamdrok Lake, Tibet. Location filming took place at the Beijing Farm Animal Research Center and the Dagao International Art Unit.

=== Casting ===
On June 24, 2014, Li Yifeng confirmed through Weibo that he would be taking on the leading role of Wu Xie. On August 31, 2014, official posters of the main cast including Li, Yang Yang, Liu Tianzuo, Ken Chang and Wei Wei were released. On November 5, 2014, Tiffany Tang was revealed to be the female lead of the series.

== Deviation from novel ==
In the novel, Wu Xie is the owner of an antique store but in the series, he is an overseas returnee who studied at a German University and returned to China to return an antique to the country. The rest of the team also became "protectors of the antique" instead of a "tomb-raiding team".

Two new characters, High Master and Cheng Chengcheng, were also created for the web series.

== Reception ==
The Lost Tomb is the most watched web drama of 2015 with over 2.8 billion views.

Despite its popularity, the series was criticized for its draggy story-line and poorly done special effects. Fans of the novel also commented that the plot and characters deviated too much from the original novel.

== Awards and nominations ==
Year	Award	Category	Recipient	Result
2014	2015 iQiyi All-Star Carnival	Most Anticipated Web Drama	The Lost Tomb	Won
2015	2016 iQiyi All-Star Carnival	Popular Actor of the Year	Yang Yang	Won
2015	2016 iQiyi All-Star Carnival	Drama of the Year	The Lost Tomb	Won
2015	6th Macau International Television Festival	Outstanding Web Drama	The Lost Tomb	Won
2015	7th China TV Drama Awards	Best Web Series	The Lost Tomb	Won

== See also ==
- Time Raiders, a 2016 film based on the same novel series
- The Mystic Nine, a 2016 prequel on the same novel series

== International broadcast ==
Country	Network(s)/Station(s)	Series premiere	Title
(China)	iQiyi / Viki	12 June 2015 - ()	盜墓筆記 (電視劇) ( ; lit: )
Thailand	AMRIN TV HD (อมรินทร์ทีวี)	August 5, 2018 - , 2018 (Every Sunday from 16.00 - 17.00)	ล่าขุมทรัพย์ปริศนา ( ; lit: )
(India)	Dishoom+	18 Feb - 25 Mar 2025	The Lost Tomb ( ; lit: )
