= Time Raiders =

- Poster
- Chinese: 盗墓笔记
- Directed by: Daniel Lee
- Written by: Wang Xiaotai; Ye Zhangqing; Du Jun; Sun Wu
- Based on: Daomu Biji by Xu Lei
- Produced by: Susanna Tsang; Si Fangyu
- Starring: Jing Boran; Luhan; Ma Sichun; Mallika Sherawat
- Cinematography: Tony Cheung
- Edited by: Yau Chi-Wai
- Music by: Henry Lai
- Production companies: Shanghai Film Group; Le Vision Pictures (Beijing); Zhejiang Nanpai Pictures
- Distributed by: Le Vision Pictures (Beijing); Magnum Films; S&C Pictures; Shaw Organisation; Asia Releasing, Aeon Pix Studios (India)
- Release date: August 5, 2016
- Running time: 123 minutes
- Country: China
- Language: Mandarin
- Box office: CN¥1 billion

Time Raiders (Chinese: 盗墓笔记) is a 2016 Chinese fantasy-action-adventure film directed by Daniel Lee and starring Jing Boran and Luhan. It is based on the online novel series Daomu Biji written by Xu Lei. The film was released in China by Le Vision Pictures on August 5, 2016.

== Plot ==
In the Himalayas, European antiquities hunter Hendrix and his soldiers terrorize the local people in search of a clue to the Chinese secret of immortality. Zhang Qiling intervenes, defeating Hendrix, and is tasked by the local elder with averting a catastrophe for humanity.

In the present day, a writer arrives at a warehouse to interview antiquities dealer Wu Xie, who relates his story.

Wu Xie is born to a family of grave robbers. As a young boy, Wu sneaks into a temple and tries to steal a relic, but is stopped by a figure in a bronze mask.

In his twenties, Wu explores a tomb from the Warring States period when he is confronted by his uncle Wu Sanxing. The two stumble across a hidden chamber, whose inscriptions relate the tale of Iron Mask, a craftsman forced to design the tomb of the Snake Empress, ruler of the ancient kingdom of Tamutuo in what is now the Gobi Desert. Wu discovers an artifact before moths force them to flee the tomb. Hendrix orders his team to examine video from media reports of the moth incident, confirming the artifact's link to Tamutuo. Zhang, who has not aged since his encounter with Hendrix, also watches the video.

Wu and Sanxing examine the artifact and realize it is a key to the tomb of the Snake Empress. Zhang joins their expedition; he reveals to Wu that he is a divine being who suffers from intermittent amnesia. Wu confides that his dreams are haunted by the temple experience from his youth.

Sanxing's team blasts an entrance into the tomb complex but they are pursued by another team of grave robbers led by Ning, who is in Hendrix's employ. Ning releases drones which scan the tomb structure and relay the data to Hendrix. Sanxing's team brave booby traps and flesh-eating beetles but Wu and Zhang are separated by a cave-in.

Ning's team enters a chamber containing dormant warriors that appear human but, on analysis, are composed of plant cells. A warrior awakens and attacks the team, forcing them to retreat.

Wu wanders into the warriors’ chamber where he reunites with Zhang; they kill the awakened warrior, but Ning appears, stealing the key. Wu and Zhang catch up to Ning, who demands Hendrix reveal the purpose of the mission. Hendrix reveals that the Snake Empress ingested the essence of a magical tree to sleep for two thousand years and create an army of worms to destroy humanity when she awakens, immortal.

Hendrix directs them to the Snake Empress’ lair, which they access with the key. The Empress awakens, sending her worms out into the world. Sanxing's and Ning's teams also enter the lair. Zhang battles the Empress but is unable to penetrate her magnetic force field. Wu convinces Hendrix to discard his life's goal of achieving immortality and tells them how to defeat the Empress. Sanxing's and Ning's men use explosives to destroy the magnetic fields, letting Zhang kill the Empress, thereby killing her worms. As Wu, Ning, Sanxing, and the remnants of their teams escape the collapsing lair, Wu looks back at Zhang, who is unable to escape.

In flashbacks, Wu recalls his memories of Zhang. The closing scene is a repetition of the scene where Wu and Zhang first met, except that when the two glance back at each other, Zhang sees Iron Mask and Wu sees the bronze masked figure.

== Cast ==
- Luhan as Wu Xie (吴邪)
- Jing Boran as Zhang Qiling (张起灵)
- Ma Sichun as Ning (阿宁)
- Wang Jingchun as Wu Sanxing (吴三省)
- Vanni Corbellini as Hendrix
- Mallika Sherawat as Snake Empress
- Robert Gilabert Cuenca as Ning´s Mercenary

== Box office ==
The film earned $5.8 million in Thursday previews, $24.1 million on its opening day and $70.8 million on its opening weekend ($64.6 million excluding previews) debuting in first place at the Chinese box office. It performed exceptionally well in IMAX where the film brought in $5 million for the opening weekend from 309 IMAX theaters, marking the largest IMAX opening of the summer for a Chinese local-language film, and the third biggest of all time, behind Mojin — The Lost Legend ($7.5 million) and Monster Hunt ($7.2 million). It had the largest circuit of theaters in the country by registering with over 85,000 screenings per day and the best per screen average, with close to $1,000 per screen, per day. Excluding previews, its weekend take was not only the biggest in China but the third biggest internationally, behind Suicide Squad and The Secret Life of Pets. The film's impressive Chinese opening weekend was helped by fans of young, popular stars Lu Han and Jing Boran, whose enthusiasm outweighed overwhelmingly negative reviews.

Hindered by poor word of mouth and competition from local releases, it fell precipitously by 80% on its second weekend earning around $13 million and as a result fell to fourth place. Nonetheless, it managed to pass $150 million and became the one and only local summer release to cross that mark this year.

== See also ==
- The Lost Tomb, a television series based on the same novel series
