= Daomu Biji =

Novel series by Xu Lei (Nan Pai San Shu)

- The Secret of Grave Robber #2
- Author: Xu Lei
- Original title: 盗墓笔记
- Language: Chinese
- Subject: tomb adventure
- Genre: historical fiction, science fiction
- Publication date: 2007
- Publication place: China

Daomu Biji (Chinese: 盗墓笔记; pinyin: Dàomù bǐjì; variously interpreted as Grave Robbers' Chronicles, (Note: Title of the English translation of the book.) Grave Robbery Note, (Note: Title seen on manhua edition of the story.) or The Lost Tomb (Note: Title seen on some serial edition of the story.)) is a modern Chinese novel series about the grave-robbing adventures of Wu Xie, a young man hailing from a family that had been tomb-raiders for centuries. The series was written by Xu Lei (徐磊), better known by his pen-name Nan Pai San Shu (南派三叔).

It was first serialized online at Qidian China (起点中文网), a Chinese website for publishing, writing and reading novels, as a fanwork of Ghost Blows Out the Light originally. Written over a span of five years and published as nine separate novels, it is one of the most popular novel series in China from 2007 with several million fans and over 20 million copies sold. The author has also written two sequels, Zang Hai Hua (藏海花), Sha Hai (沙海), which continued the leading character's story, neither of which were finished at the time of the author's announcement to retire from writing on March 22, 2013. The author returned to writing in 2019 with another unfinished sequel, Reboot: Thunder at the Distant Sea (重启之极海听雷).

Aside from the main novels and sequels, Nan Pai San Shu written numerous extra contents, such as side-stories, spin-offs, and prequels focusing on not only Wu Xie and his friends, but also other important characters that makes up the universe.

Along with Ghost Blows Out the Light, Daomu has contributed greatly to creating a craze and subsequent market in the Greater China area for novels focusing on grave-robbing that also deal with the supernatural. Due to its success, Daomu Biji has become a multimedia franchise, receiving numerous adaptions, including live-action television series, films, games, stage plays, and manhua.

== Plot ==
Fifty years ago, a group of Changsha grave robbers dug out manuscripts of the location of treasures from Warring states, but an encounter with an undead rendered almost the whole group dead. In the present, the young grandchild of the sole survivor, Wu Xie, discovers a secret within his grandfather's notes. Together with his third uncle, Wu Sanxing, and a few other experienced tomb robbers, to search for the treasure. But what no one expected to find the intriguing mysteries that accompanied their tomb robbing adventure - just who was the owner of that tomb? Will they be able to find the real coffin? And just where will these puzzle lead the group?

Across eight volumes, Wu Xie solves millennium-old mysteries, sees the deterioration of his naïve worldview as he learns that people are not what they seem, and he cannot trust anyone in his entourage.

== Main characters ==
- Wu Xie (Chinese: 吴邪): The point-of-view character and primary protagonist. He is from the Hangzhou Wu family, one of the Changsha Old Nine, a group of families who have been grave-robbing for centuries. At the beginning of the first book he joins his uncle Wu Sanxing to experience grave-robbing for the first time, setting off the series of events to come in later books. His name is a homophone with "innocent" (无邪, also pronounced "Wu Xie"), indicating his gullible nature.
- Zhang Qiling (Chinese: 张起灵): A man with a mysterious past whose story leads the last few volumes of the chronicles. He is often hired as an assistant to many grave-robbing endeavors and is highly competent at it; very little is known about him, even his real name. He is from the true branch of the Zhang family, one of the Changsha Old Nine. Like all true branch Zhang family members, he has a Qilin tattoo spanning his left shoulder, his blood is noted to ward off evil, and his index and middle finger are noticeably longer than his other fingers.
- "Fatty" Wang (Chinese: 王胖子): Nicknamed "Gold Getting Xiao Wei", he is a northern grave-robber (as opposed to Wu Xie, from the south) and teams up with both Wu Xie and Zhang Qiling throughout the books; together they are referred to as the "Iron Triangle."
- Wu Sanxing (Chinese: 吴三省): Wu Xie's third uncle. An experienced grave-robber with a few well-kept secrets.
- Pan Zi (Chinese: 潘子): Sanxing's right-hand man, who had served in the Sino-Vietnamese War prior to becoming a grave-robber.
- A'ning (Chinese: 阿宁): A grave-robber and the first major female introduced in the series, she seems to be working against the protagonists and has ties to Henry Cox, the antagonist of the Changsha Old Nine.
- Hei Yanjing (Chinese: 黑眼镜): A mercenary with a mysterious past and is thought to be as competent as Zhang Qiling. He takes every opportunity to make money and is noted to be very expensive. Like Zhang Qiling, very little is known about his past; his real name is said to be very ugly. He has ties to the Qi family of the Changsha Old Nine. He becomes Wu Xie's mentor in Tomb of the Sea. His eyes are special in that the darker an area is, the better he can see. His name literally means "Black Glasses". Because of his eyes, he is often called "Black Blind (Chinese: 黑瞎子)".
- Xie Yuchen (Chinese: 解雨臣): The current head of the Xie family, one of the Changsha Old Nine. A childhood friend of Wu Xie, he is adept in martial arts, Chinese opera, and various other skills. He is noted to be very wealthy, enough to afford Hei Yanjing multiple times, and is the successor and student of Er Yue Hong, previous Hong family head of the Changsha Old Nine. Because of his "pretty-boy" looks and his tendency to wear pink, he is often called "Xiao Hua (Chinese: 小花)", literally meaning "Little Flower".

== Adaptations ==
In 2011, a serialized manhua, drawn by Dongdong and Yuelu, was published. After the fifth volume, the author of Daomu Biji had an argument with Dongdong and Yuelu. This, unfortunately ended the manhua series. There is also an American serialized graphic novel. There are currently eight novels.

In 2014, it was announced that the series would be made into eight seasons (though only three seasons have been made as of 2020), with the first season airing in 2015. It covered the events of the first book, and was titled The Lost Tomb in English.

In 2016, the novel series was adapted into an action adventure movie titled Time Raiders. The movie made 1 billion yuan at the box office. The movie ranked the ninth largest box office in mainland China in 2016, and it placed fifth place in the Chinese movie box office ranking. The prequel, The Mystic Nine was adapted into a series as well followed by four spin-off web movies focusing on four of the characters:

- The Mystic Nine Side Story: Flowers Bloom in February;
- The Mystic Nine Side Story: Tiger Bones Plum Blossom / Murders in the Xie Mansion;
- The Mystic Nine Side Story: Ganges Killing the Trees / Phantom of Bifang Buckle;
- The Mystic Nine Side Story: Four Belongs to Abelmoschus.

In 2019, the second season of the 2015 adaptation, titled The Lost Tomb 2, began aired with an all-new cast. It covers the events of the second, third, and partially fourth books.

In December 2020, the third season of the 2015 adaptation, titled Ultimate Note, aired with an all-new cast, aside from the returning cast of Wang Meng, Zhang Ri Shan, Yin Nan Feng, Chen Pi A Si, Jin Wan Tang from Sha Hai and Hendry Cox from The Lost Tomb 2. It covers the events of the fifth, sixth, and seven books.

In 2018, the first sequel was adapted and titled Tomb of the Sea and was aired with an all-new cast and returning actors from The Lost Tomb 2. It covers the events of the sequel Sha Hai (Chinese: 沙海) and a bit of Zang Hai Hua (藏海花). It was followed by three spin-off web movies, Tomb of the Sea Side Story: Bang Ren (蚌人), Tomb of the Sea Side Story: Hua Mei (画媒), and Tomb of the Sea Side Story: Ran Gu (燃骨).

In July 2020, the online drama Reunion: The Sound of the Providence aired, with a new cast headed by Zhu Yilong, aside from the returning cast of "Fatty" Wang, Kan Jian, Huo Daofu and returning actors from Tomb of the Sea. Split into two seasons with 62 episodes total, it adapted the sequel novel Reboot: Thunder at the Distant Sea (重启之极海听雷). A short web series spin-off, Reunion: The Sound of the Providence Side Story: Ping Yao Wang Shi (平妖往事) was released, focusing on the shared ancestor of the side characters.

In 2021, the season sequel to The Lost Tomb 2, The Lost Tomb 2: Explore With the Note, began aired with an all-new cast, aside from the returning casts of "Fatty" Wang, Mrs. Huo, Hendry Cox and Wu Sanxing from The Lost Tomb 2. It covers the events of the fourth book. Another short web series spin-off, Echo of Moonfall (月陨回声) was released, focusing on the side characters from Reunion: The Sound of the Providence. The action-adventure movie Reunion: Escape from the Monstrous Snake was also released with an all-new cast, aside from the returning cast of Hei Yanjing from Tomb of the Sea. It is a side-story that focuses on Hei Yanjing and his adventure in Cambodia. A 12-episode animated 3D Chinese series titled The Buried Tree Devil, an adaption of Volume 2 and it premiered on April 4, 2021.

In 2022, the action-adventure movie Reunion 2: Mystery of the Abyss, was released with an all-new cast, aside from the returning cast of Hei Yanjing from Tomb of the Sea and Reunion: Escape from the Monstrous Snake. It is a side-story whose plot was developed by the author and focuses on side characters from the series. Chronologically, it takes place before the extra-story novel Moving Forward Through the Flowery Night: The End Comes Without A Sound and after the two Reunion sequels.

In 2023, two films featuring original storyline of the Iron Triangle after their retirement to Rain Village was released, Conjuring Curse (介子鬼城) and Misty Creed (黑金古殿). Filming for the adaptation of theTibetian Sea Flower (藏海花) was also completed and aired under the title Adventure Behind the Bronze Door in 2024. With 2024, two spin-off prequel films for Adventure Behind the Bronze Door was released, centering Zhang Haike and Zhang Nian, titled Tibetan Sea Flower: Snowy Night, Murderous Lantern (藏海花之雪夜凶灯) and Tibetan Sea Flower: Dark Nest Surge (藏海花之暗巢汹涌).

In 2025, a television series titled The Legend of Zang Hai was released and is centers around the life of Zang Hai, an important historical figure with connections to the tombs that Wu Xie and the cast raids years later. A new adaptation action-adventure fantasy television series of main storyline was also released, titled Time Raiders, also known as Wu Xie's Private Notes.

In 2026, an adventure-mystery television series Archives: The Nanyang Mystery premiered and is set in the Republican-era China, focusing on the Zhang family of the Southern Archives.
