= Chen Yao =

Chen Yao is the name of:

- Chen Yao (volleyball) (born 1988), Chinese volleyball player
- Chen Yao (Dota player) (born 1990), Chinese video game player
- Chen Yao (actress) (born 1994), Chinese actress

== See also ==
- Yao Chen (born 1979), Chinese actress and philanthropist
