= Zheng Yecheng =

Chinese actor (born 1993)

- Born: 26 August 1993 (age 32); Jilin City, Jilin
- Education: National Academy of Chinese Theatre Arts
- Occupation: Actor
- Years active: 2012–present

Chinese name
- Simplified Chinese: 郑业成
- Traditional Chinese: 鄭業成
Transcriptions
Standard Mandarin
- Hanyu Pinyin: Zhèng Yèchéng

Zheng Yecheng (Chinese: 郑业成, born 26 August 1993) is a Chinese actor. He graduated from the National Academy of Chinese Theatre Arts, majoring in Chinese opera.

== Biography ==
Zheng made his acting debut in 2012, co-starring in the film The Cosplayers. He was then cast in his first television series, A Legend of Chinese Immortal.

Zheng first attracted attention with his role as Wang Cai in the popular xianxia television series Swords of Legends. The same year he starred in the family drama He and His Sons, winning acclaim for his role as a rebellious teenager.

Zheng gained further recognition with his role as Nan Xianyue in the hit xianxia romance drama The Journey of Flower. The same year, he starred in the historical drama The Legend of Mi Yue, playing Song Yu.

Zheng's breakout role was in the romantic comedy series Love O2O, where he became known by his character "Senior Beauty". The same year, he starred in his first lead role in Huajianghu, a live-action web series based on the anime of the same name.

Zheng then reunited with The Journey of Flower co-star An Yuexi in the fantasy comedy web series Let's Shake It. The low budget series unexpectedly become popular and gained positive reviews. He subsequently reprised his role in the second season of the series.

In 2018, Zheng starred alongside Janice Wu in the fantasy action drama An Oriental Odyssey. In 2019, Zheng co-starred in the historical political drama Royal Nirvana.

In 2019, Zheng played the male lead in xianxia romance drama Love of Thousand Years, and historical romance drama The Sleepless Princess.

== Filmography ==
=== Film ===
Year	English title	Chinese title	Role	Notes/Ref.
2013	The Cosplayers	百万爱情宝贝	Bang Bangtang	
2015	Half Love	一半一半，爱情未满	Xiao Mo	Short film
2016	Guardians of Night	王牌御史之猎妖教室	Ye Yan	
2024	A Legend	傳奇	Ye Cheng	

=== Television series ===
Year	English title	Chinese title	Role	Network	Notes/Ref.
2014	The Romance of the Condor Heroes	神雕侠侣	Xiao Wang	Hunan TV	Uncredited
2014	Swords of Legends	古剑奇谭	Wang Cai	Hunan TV	
2014	A Legend of Chinese Immortal	剑侠	Lan Caihe	Jiangsu TV	
2014	He and His Sons	半路父子	Gao Wan	Dragon TV, Zhejiang TV, Anhui TV, Shenzhen TV	
2015	Seventeen Blue	会痛的十七岁	Wang Ziqiao	Youku	
2015	Intouchable	男神执事团	Yu Zaochuan		
2015	The Journey of Flower	花千骨	Nan Wuyue / Nan Xianyue	Hunan TV	
2015	The Legend of Mi Yue	芈月传	Song Yu	Beijing TV, Dragon TV	
2016	Revive	重生之名流巨星	Li Xiao	Tencent	
2016	Singing All Along	秀丽江山之长歌行	Deng Yu (young)	Jiangsu TV	
2016	Love O2O	微微一笑很倾城	Hao Mei	Dragon TV, Jiangsu TV	
2016	Huajianghu	画江湖之不良人	Li Xingyun	iQIYI	
2017	The Song	恋恋阕歌	Du Chunsheng	Mango TV	
2017	Lost Love in Times	醉玲珑	Linglong Shi	Dragon TV	Cameo
2017	Let's Shake It	颤抖吧，阿部	Tang Qingfeng	Youku	
2018	Let's Shake It 2	颤抖吧阿部之朵星风云	Tang Qingfeng	Youku	
2018	An Oriental Odyssey	盛唐幻夜	Mu Le / Ah Ying	Tencent	
2019	Royal Nirvana	鹤唳华亭	Gu Fengen	Youku	
2020	Love of Thousand Years	三千鸦杀	Fu Jiuyun	Mango TV, Youku	
2020	The Sleepless Princess	离人心上	Xue Yao	Mango TV	
2020	Farewell to Yunjian	别云间	Gu Fengen	Youku	
2021	Stealth Walker	玫瑰行者	Zhang Xian He	Youku	Main Role
2021	Crossroad Bistro	北辙南辕	Zhao He Nan	iQIYI	
2021	Love Under the Full Moon	满月之下请相爱	Xu Xiao Dong	iQIYI	Main Role
2022	Mirror: A Tale of Twin Cities	镜·双城	Zhen Lan	Tencent	
2022	My Sassy Princess	祝卿好	Shen Yan	iQIYI	Main Role
2023	Enlighten Your Life	许你万家灯火	Lin Qi	CCTV-1	Main Role
2023	Desire Catcher	邪恶催眠师之捕梦人	Lu Feng Ping	Mango TV	Main Role
TBA	An Eternal Thought	一念永恒	Bai Xiao Chun		Main Role
TBA	The Assassin	隐娘	Zhu Jing / Jing Zhen	Youku	Main Role

== Discography ==
=== Soundtrack appearances ===
Year	English title	Chinese title	Album	Notes/Ref.
2015	"Untouchable Lover"	不可触摸的恋人	Intouchable OST	with Liu Zhihong, Zhang Ziwen & Li Hongyi
2016	"A Smile is Beautiful"	一笑倾城	Love O2O OST	with Zhang He, Vin Zhang Bai Yu & Cui Hang
2017	"Exclusive Love"	专属爱情	Let's Shake It OST	with An Yuexi
2018	"Loving the Scenery"	恋恋风景	Let's Shake It 2 OST	with An Yuexi

== Accolades ==
Year	Award	Category	Nominated work	Ref.
2016	Powerstar Award Ceremony	New Star Award	—N/a	
2016	6th iQIYI All-Star Carnival	Best New Television Actor	Love O2O	
2018	2nd Internet Film Festival	Best Actor (Web series)	Let's Shake It	
2019	Golden Bud - The Fourth Network Film And Television Festival	Most Promising Actor	Royal Nirvana	
