= Xu Haiqiao =

Chinese actor (born 1983)

- Born: Xu Yao (徐垚); 17 April 1983 (age 43); Jinan, China
- Other name: Joe Xu
- Education: Shanghai Theatre Academy
- Occupation: Actor
- Agent(s): Haina Shengshi Pictures (Beijing) Co., Ltd

Chinese name
- Traditional Chinese: 徐海喬
- Simplified Chinese: 徐海乔
Transcriptions
Standard Mandarin
- Hanyu Pinyin: Xú Hǎiqiáo

Xu Haiqiao (simplified Chinese: 徐海乔; traditional Chinese: 徐海喬; pinyin: Xú Hǎiqiáo, born 17 April 1983), also known as Joe Xu, is a Chinese actor. He is best known for his roles in television series The Dream Of Red Mansions, The Journey of Flower, Revive, Detective Samoyeds, and Lost Love in Times. He graduated from Shanghai Theatre Academy.

== Filmography ==
=== Film ===
Year	English title	Chinese title	Role	Notes
2008	Dusk	暮色	Li Lei	Web film
2008	Melody	旋律	Xu Yao	
2011	The Founding of a Party	建党伟业	Qu Qiubai	
2012	Tree in the Rain	雨中的树	Du Xiaomei	
2012	All Life With You	一生有你	Zhang Lubai	
2013	Dead Sign	古镇凶灵之巫咒缠身	Kang Kai	
2013	Slow in Love	慢慢爱系列电影	Tang Wei	Short film
2020	Passage of My Youth	岁月忽已暮		Special appearance
2020	Chu Wang Qing Shen	触网情深		
2021		画心之双生劫		

=== Television series ===
Year	English title	Chinese title	Role	Notes
2008	So Called Marriage	所谓婚姻	Wang Jianzheng	
2010	The Dream of Red Mansions	新版红楼梦	Liu Xianglian	
2010	LOHAS Family	乐活家庭	Da Wei	Cameo
2011	Sister Sunny Piggy	春光灿烂猪九妹	Sha Wujing	
2011	College Student Soldiers	大学生士兵的故事1	Xu Shuai	
2012	Bloody Battle of the Vast Sky	血战长空	Xu Shiye	
2012	Schemes of a Mother	娘心计	He Runsheng	
2013	College Student Soldiers II	大学生士兵的故事2	Xu Shuai	
2014	Old Cities Past Events	古城往事	Xin Chun	
2015	The Amazing Bride	极品新娘	Yu Wanquan	
2015	The Journey of Flower	花千骨	Meng Xuanlang	
2015	The Story of Furong	芙蓉诀	Qin Zique	
2016	The Son of Heaven	真命天子	Han Lin’er	
2016	Revive	重生之名流巨星	Feng Jing	
2016	Demon Girl	半妖倾城	Wang Shaotang	
2016	The Fire of Youth	39度青春	Gao Fei	
2016	Hot Girl	麻辣变形计	Yang Deng	Cameo
2017	Kun Lun Que	昆仑阙之前世今生	Chong Yi / Chong Li	
2017	Detective Samoyeds	热血长安	Samo Duoluo	
2017	Lost Love in Times	醉玲珑	Yuan Zhan	
2017	Let's Shake It	颤抖吧，阿部	Bai Yu	Cameo
2018	The Dark Lord	夜天子	Ye Xiaotian / Ye Xiaoan	
2018	Starlight	那抹属于我的星光	Shen Junyi / Shen Junyao	
2019	A Little Thing Called First Love	初恋那件小事		Cameo
2021	Marvelous Women	当家主母	Ren Xue Tang	
2022	A Dream of Splendor	梦华录	Ou Yang Xu	
2022	Love Between Fairy and Devil	苍兰诀	Rong Hao	
TBA	The Magnificent Five	墨客行	Lu Li	
TBA	Lose My Heart to You	心爱的	Gu Tiancheng	
TBA	Nowhere	无忧之地	Yang Shenxing	
TBA	SWAT - Special Weapon and Tactics	战警	Gao Di	

== Discography ==
Year	English title	Chinese title	Album
2017	Lost In Chang’an	长安醉	Detective Samoyeds OST
2017		侠客行	Detective Samoyeds OST
2018		爱在星光灿烂时	Starlight OST

== Awards and nominations ==
Year	Award	Category	Nominated work	Result	Ref.
2016	1st Golden Guduo Media Awards	Most Popular Actor (Web series)	Revive	Won	
2017	2nd Asia New Media Film Festival	Best Actor (Web series)	Detective Samoyeds	Won	
