= Tang Jingmei =

Chinese actress

- Born: 汤晶媚; May 24, 1987 (age 39); Jiangxi, China
- Education: Beijing Film Academy
- Occupation: Actress
- Years active: 2009–present

Tang Jingmei ([tʰáŋ tɕíŋ.měɪ]; Chinese: 汤晶媚; born May 24, 1987), is a Chinese actress. She gained popularity through her various supporting roles.

== Filmography ==
=== Film ===
Year	English title	Chinese title	Role	Notes
2011	If Without You	假如没有你	Mei Qi	
2011		城市映像之你不知道我的秘密	Murong Hong	
2012	Rhapsody of Marriage	结婚狂想曲	Yang Yang	
2012	Lost Control	完全失控	Sugar	
2014	Young Friend Forever	我的青春蜜友	Xiu Lian	
2014	The Crossing	太平轮	Dancer	Cameo
2016	The New Year's Eve of Old Lee	过年好		Cameo
2017	Revenge for Love	疯岳撬佳人	Jiajia	
2018	The Express	恐怖快递	Lina/Linjie	

=== Television series ===
Year	English title	Chinese title	Role	Notes
2007	A Woman without Regret	女人无悔	Chen Yan	
2011		我是特种兵	Ma Qitong	
2012	A Unique Militiman	民兵葛二蛋	Liang Zi	
2013	Down Payment	首付	Ai Mei	
2013	Longmen Express	龙门镖局	Silk Store Shopkeeper	
2013		囍事儿一串串之福山恋	Mei Xinqiu	
2014	Do not Compel Me to Marry	别逼我结婚	Chen Xing	
2014	Ten Rides of Red Army	十送红军	Zheng Ruiqiu	
2016	Young Marshal	少帅	Gu Ruiyu	
2016	Take off your Mask	摘下你的面具	Lu Jihong	
2016	Novoland: The Castle in the Sky	九州·天空城	Lin Ruizhu	
2016	Noble Aspirations	青云志	Three-tailed fox deity	
2017	The Glory of Tang Dynasty	大唐荣耀	Cui Caiping	
2017	Mr. Express and Miss Concubine	快递先生与贵妃小姐	Sun Yingnan	
2017	Lost Love in Times	醉玲珑	Wu Pingting	
2017	Huang Fei Hong	国士无双黄飞鸿	Cai Wei	
2018	Meteor Garden	流星花园	Tang Jingmei	Cameo
2020	Winter Begonia	鬓边不是海棠红	Zeng Aiyu	
2020	The Origin of Love	莽荒纪之川落雪		
2020	God of Lost Fantasy	太古神王	Bai Qiuxue	
2020	Mind The Gap	一念无间		
2021	Lie to Love	良言写意	Shen Xieqing	

== Awards and nominations ==
Year	Award	Category	Nominated work	Result	Ref.
2016	28th Golden Eagle Awards	Best Actress	Ten Rides of Red Army	Nominated	
