= Lost Love in Times =

Chinese television series

- Also known as: Drunken Exquisiteness; Drunk Linglong
- Genre: Historical fiction Romance; Fantasy
- Based on: Drunk Linglong by Shi Siye
- Written by: Rao Jun; Han Peizhen; Shi Siye; Chen Whenjuan; Dong Xinru
- Directed by: Lin Yufen; Liang Shengquan; Yu Cuihua; Ren Haitao
- Starring: Cecilia Liu; William Chan
- Country of origin: China
- Original language: Mandarin
- No. of seasons: 1
- No. of episodes: 56

Production
- Executive producer: Tang Lijun
- Production locations: Beijing, Dunhuang, Xiangshan
- Running time: 40 minutes
- Production companies: New iPicture; Straw Bear; Shanghai Entertainment Team Media Group

Original release
- Network: Dragon TV
- Release: 13 July – 29 September 2017

Lost Love in Times
- Simplified Chinese: 醉玲珑
Transcriptions
Standard Mandarin
- Hanyu Pinyin: Zui Linglong

Lost Love in Times (Chinese: 醉玲珑) is a 2017 Chinese television series starring Cecilia Liu and William Chan, based on Shi Siye's novel Drunk Linglong. The series aired two episodes back-to-back on Dragon TV every Thursday and Friday at 22:00 (CST) from 13 July to 29 September 2017. Starting from 6 September 2017, the series took over the timeslot for The Jin Xing Show, airing on every Wednesdays at 22:00 (CST), in addition to its current timeslot.

== Synopsis ==
Qingchen (Cecilia Liu), a sorceress of the Mages, a group of Wu shamans tasked with protecting the royal family, and Yuan Ling (William Chan), fourth prince of Great Wei, were born with the destiny of the dual stars, which makes them fall in love at first sight, but with their love follows calamity. As Qingchen is the Great Sorceress of the Mages and can't marry into the royal family, at first she attempts to fight her feelings for the Prince for the sake of the kingdom, but in the end believes in their love. When Ling legitimately ascends to the throne, he decides to marry Qingchen despite the opposition of both the royal court and the Mages. Seventh prince Yuan Zhan, who hungers after the throne, launches a coup on the day of the wedding ceremony, and Qingchen uses the Sacred Pebbles of Nine Transformations to create a new timeline in an effort to prevent the imminent bloodshed. The Sacred Pebbles send the sorceress a year before the coup, but in a parallel world where no one knows her and with people who now have different histories, most notably the Seventh Prince Yuan Zhan. Forearmed with the knowledge of the dual stars and calamity, the sorceress now makes it her quest to prevent Yuan Ling from falling in love with her and fulfill his destiny to become Great Wei's greatest emperor.

== Cast ==
=== Main ===
- Cecilia Liu as Qingchen
  A sorceress residing in the Meandering Skies who possesses extraordinary healing skills. Beyond her gentle and weak appearance lies a calculating and intelligent mind. In the previous universe, her relationship with Yuan Ling caused disastrous results. In the second universe, she isn't willing to make the same mistake and pushes him away. Eventually, she caves into her feelings.
- William Chan as Yuan Ling
  4th prince of Great Wei, and son of the deceased Emperor Renzong. Known as the God of War, he is also the commander of the powerful and awe-inspiring Xuanjia. He falls for Qingchen, a sorceress, who he vows to protect. He is fearless, calculating and self-assured; yet beneath his cold exterior is a passionate man who would do anything to protect those that are important to him. Although Qingchen pushes him away, he still continues to vie for her.

=== Supporting ===
==== Great Wei royal family ====
- Xu Haiqiao as Yuan Zhan
  7th prince. In the previous universe, he is a cold and relentless man who wants the throne. In the next universe, he is refined, calm and intelligent. He has no interest towards politics and loves nature, arts and music; yet he is pulled into a political war. He is in love with Qingchen and assists her whenever she needs help even though she doesn't feel the same.
- Liu Yijun as Yuan An
  The Emperor of Great Wei, a scheming and autocratic man who is especially harsh toward his children.
- Jiang Lingjin as Empress
  She was supposedly poisoned with sorcery by Prime Minister Feng's deceased daughter, Xianwu. It was revealed later that she was killed by Consort Lian because she found out about her true identity.
- Zeng Li as Consort Mo Lian
  Yuan Ling's mother, a beautiful and scheming woman. Her secret identity is Dingshui, the last head chief of the dark sorceress.
- Fang Xiaoli as Noble Consort Yin
  Yuan Zhan's mother. A gentle and virtuous woman who doesn't seek power, but is later forced to due to dire circumstances. She killed her own son in order to frame Yuan Ling, but Yuan Ting revealed her schemes soon after. She was eventually banished to the Cold Palace.
- Gao Yiqing as Crown Prince Yuan Hao
  A gentle man who doesn't vie for power, and craves for freedom. He loves Luanfei deeply despite knowing she is actually a spy for Yuan Ming.
- Ji Chen as Yuan Ji (3rd prince)
  He takes care of all his sibling and is looked down upon due to mother's low birth. He particularly takes care of Yuan Ming and died to protect his betrayal.
  - Zhang Junshuo as young Yuan Ji
- Li Chengyuan as Consort Jin Hui
  Yuan Zhan's side-consort and illegitimate daughter of Jin family. A gentle, understanding and virtuous woman who selflessly supports her husband despite knowing that he loves Qingchen.
- Ryan Zhang as Yuan Ming (9th prince)
  A cunning and vicious man who hides a secret ambition. He is selfish and abuses Luanfei's love for him by making use of her. He loves his former wife Feng Xianwu and devotes his life to find out the truth about her death.
  - Zhang Zheyu as young Yuan Ming
- Gong Jun as Yuan Che (11th prince)
  A genuine and sincere man who knows where his loyalty lies. He is fiercely loyal to Yuan Ling and would do anything to aid him in need. He has a long one-sided love on Yin Caiqian, who eventually reciprocates his feeling.
- Xu Jiawei as Yuan Li (12th prince)
  Yuan An dotes on him greatly due to his simpleness; he causes his older siblings plenty of troubles, but is forgiven and spoiled due to his weak constitution. His actual identity is Guardian of the Magic Circle on Nine Transformations. He shares a friendship with Qingchen and protects her. He eventually falls in love with Mingyan.
- Wang Ruolin as Yuan Xi (5th prince)
  A man who wants to vie for the throne. He is assassinated to frame Yuan Ling.
- Huang Haige as Yuan Ting
  The only son of Yuan Xi. He was used by his grandmother to frame Yuan Ling by stealing his military seal, but he revealed the truth on the day Yuan Ling was to be executed. He and his mother were banished from the city as a result.
- Lu Meifang as Zheng Tong
  Yuan Xi's wife.

==== Sorcerer tribe ====
- Han Xue as Taoyao
  Head Sorceress of the Mages. Beyond her cold and strict appearance lies a fragile heart. She and Xixie are mutually in love.
- Han Dong as Xixie
  Head Sorcerer of the Mages; Qingchen's teacher. He wants nothing but peace, but gets embroiled in the princes' fight for the throne. He raised Qingchen since young and wants to groom her to be the next Head Sorceress. He is mutually in love with Taoyao.
- Tang Jingmei as Wu Pingting
  A powerful dark wizard from Tianwu Pavilion. She sees Qingchen as her deadly rival and creates many dangerous situations for her. Loyal to Yuan Ming.
- Zhang Gong as Mo Buping
  An astrologer, and the teacher of the various princes. He is secretly an elder of the Mages.
- Bao Tianqi as Dingshui
  The last chief of the dark sorceresses and the true identity of Consort Lian. She was originally a sorceress of the Mages, but gave up her identity to marry into the royal family. She faked her death while taking her trial. Soon after, she took over the role of Head Chief of the dark sorceresses after the last two were killed.
- Ma Chunrui as Mingyan
  Qingchen's friend and Taoyao's disciple. She falls in love with Yuan Li after posing as Mo Buping's astrology student.
- Ma Yue as Biyao
  Qingchen's friend.
- Chai Wei as Meiya
  Qingchen's friend, she is killed by Liang's soldiers.

==== Generals and officials of Great Wei ====
- Su Hang as Zhang Shu
  Commander of Huixia army and the Crown prince's trusted subordinate.
- Hu Lin as Qin Zhan
  Commander of Yulin army. An understanding man who stands by justice, he later assists Yuan Ling and Qingchen.
- Chen Xinze as Wei Changzheng, general of Xuanjia army.
- Yang Taoge as Li Lin, Yuan Zhan's loyal sidekick.
- Fu Jun as Feng Yan
  Prime Minister of Great Wei, and the Crown Prince's tutor. Feng Xianwu and Feng Luanfei's father.
- Zhang Bojun as Minister Qin
- Lou Yajiang as Yin Jianzheng
  Right Prime Minister, brother of Noble Consort Yin.

==== Others ====
- Huang Mengying as Duoxia
  Princess of Achai Tribe. A valiant and heroic warrior who loves sword-fighting and horse riding, but turns into a gentle woman in front of the man she loves. She loves Yuan Ling, but cares enough for him to let him be with Qingchen.
- Xu Jian as Mu Kesha

Great general of Achai Tribe, he's a brave and capable warrior. He admires his childhood friend Duoxia to the point of infatuation.

- Wang Gang as Fulianchou
  King of Achai Tribe.
- Gu Minghan as Kualu
  Duoxia's brother.
- Liu Yinglun as Feng Luanfei
  Feng Qingchen's younger sister. A bright and innocent girl who loves Yuan Ming. She was later used as a political tool in a scheme for the throne, causing her to turn into someone cold, vengeful and cunning.
- Xu Muchan as Yin Caiqian
  Yuan Zhan's cousin, she is spoiled and unreasonable, but is actually kind at heart. She loves Ling, but later falls in love with Yuan Che.
- Mao Fangyuan as Xiao Xu

Prince of Southern Liang. A brave and learned man who was looked upon favorably by the Emperor, but later becomes obsessed with wine and women.

- Zhang Mingming as Xiao Ji

Xiao Xu's brother.

- Zheng Yecheng and Li Bo Wen as one of the Guardians of the Nine Transformations
- Xu Xun as Lu Qian, Jiangnan's number one scholar who helped saving many innocent civilians.
- Yang Guang as eunuch Sun Shi
- Wei Yu as Yin Su
- Wu Lihua as He Ruyi
- Zheng Shengli as Feng Qiu
- Guo Qiwu as Wei Zongping, responsible of palace rules and personnel.
- – as Chai Xiang, soldier of Liang.

== Production ==
The series is helmed by the team behind the 2015 hit drama The Journey of Flower; producer Tang Lijun, director Lin Yufen and scriptwriter Rao Jun. Other notable cast members include style director William Chang, who won a Golden Horse nomination for Best Costume Design with The Grandmaster; costume designer Fang Sizhe (Noble Aspirations), artistic director Chen Haozhi (Crouching Tiger, Hidden Dragon, The Last Supper) and stunt coordinator Cao Hua, who often works with director Zhang Yimou. The White Rabbit Entertainment, helmed by cinematographer Charles Lee (Monster Hunt), handles the special effects; they are the first Chinese company to attain the Content Protection & Security Program (CPS Program) by the Content Delivery & Security Association (CDSA).

The script was completed in two years. Scriptwriter Rao Jun received the help of the original author to ensure a faithful adaptation. Together, they made innovations to the novel, improved the characters and the plot at the same time, and added new ideological contents, along with elements of oriental fantasy such as double time and space. In designing the clothes, William Chang referred largely to the Western Wei Dynasty style. A 30,000 square meters set was built from scratch. It took two weeks to make each of Liu Shishi's costumes by hand, and three months for the twenty different hairstyles; the team also spent almost five months on the preparation of more than 500 armors.

Principal photography officially begun on 24 October 2016, and wrapped up filming on 20 March 2017. The first trailer, titled "Tears, Kiss, Forgetfulness" (泪吻忘情), was released on May 15.

== Original soundtrack ==
Love Lost in Time Original Soundtrack (OST)

Soundtrack album by Various artists
- Released: August 3, 2017
- Genre: Mandopop; Instrumental
- Language: Mandarin
- Label: Beijing Listening Times Entertainment Media Co., Ltd.

Lost Love in Times - Original Television Soundtrack (醉玲珑 电视剧原声音乐大碟)
No.	Title	Music	Length
1.	"Exquisiteness (玲珑)" (Ending theme song)	Jane Zhang
2.	"Because of You (因你)" (Opening theme song)	William Chan
3.	"Tears of Injury (泪伤)" (Opening theme song)	Shin
4.	"You are my Kingdom (你是我的王国)"	Mao Fangyuan
5.	"Empty Love (空情)"	Han Xue & Han Dong
6.	"Leaving with Joy (不如笑归去)"	Chou Chuan-huing
7.	"Drunken Red Dust (醉里红尘)"	Liu Xijun
8.	"Rustling in the Wind (风雨萧瑟)"	Xu Liang
9.	"Rather not Meet (不若相见)"	Gao Yiqing
10.	"Do You Know (你可知道)"	Isabelle Huang Ling
11.	"Heart Tears (洙心泪)"	Yisa Yu

Additional music provided by Jonny Easton

== Ratings ==
- Highest ratings are marked in red, lowest ratings are marked in blue

Episode #	Original broadcast date	Average audience share (CSM52)		Average audience share (National Average)		Ranking in its timeslot
Episode #	Original broadcast date	Ratings	Audience share	Ratings	Audience share	Ranking in its timeslot
1-2	July 13, 2017	0.820	4.836	0.241	1.626	2
3-4	July 14, 2017	0.861	4.763	0.281	1.85	1
5-6	July 20, 2017	0.791	4.63	0.2	1.36	
7-8	July 21, 2017	0.892	4.725	0.32	2.11	1
9-10	July 27, 2017	0.743	4.314	0.181	1.213	
11-12	July 28, 2017	0.714	3.749	0.24	1.53	
13-14	August 3, 2017	0.899	5.470	0.27	2.00	1
15-16	August 4, 2017	0.699	3.686	0.24	0.61	
17-18	August 10, 2017	0.720	4.319	0.24	1.71	
19-20	August 11, 2017	0.861	4.690	0.35	2.25	
21-22	August 17, 2017	0.753	4.524	0.26	1.84	
23-24	August 18, 2017	0.848	4.635	0.27	1.88	
25-26	August 24, 2017	0.718	4.695	NA	NA	
27-28	August 25, 2017	0.704	3.812	NA	NA	
29-30	August 31, 2017	0.721	5.848	0.22	2.35	
31-32	September 1, 2017	0.671	4.296	0.28	2.41	
33-34	September 6, 2017	0.580	3.899	0.16	1.39	
35-36	September 7, 2017	0.840	5.664	0.25	2.12	1
37-38	September 8, 2017	0.731	4.673	0.22	1.89	
39-40	September 13, 2017	0.451	3.076	0.19	1.69	
41-42	September 14, 2017	0.781	5.363	0.27	2.29	
43-44	September 15, 2017	0.671	4.056	0.208	1.214	
45-46	September 20, 2017	0.467	3.129	0.18	1.53	
47-48	September 21, 2017	0.827	5.808	0.25	2.17	
49-50	September 22, 2017	0.750	4.308	0.279	2.056	
51-52	September 27, 2017	0.459	3.087	0.195	1.762	
53-54	September 28, 2017	0.854	5.998	0.313	2.806	
55-56	September 29, 2017	0.81	5.191	0.306	2.609	

== International broadcast ==
- Hong Kong - myTV SUPER (Jul 25, 2017 ~ ), TVB Jade (Jun 26, 2019 ~ )
- Malaysia - Astro TV (Aug 14 ~ Nov 16, 2017)
- Singapore - Starhub TV VV Drama (Aug 19 ~ Nov 19, 2017), Mediacorp Channel 8 (Mar 13, 2019 ~ )
- (Singapore) , (Malaysia) , (Indonesia) , (Philippines) , (Thailand) Sony ONE (Coming Soon, Sat- Sun 19:15 SIN/MY/PH, 18:15 JKT/BKK)
- Taiwan - GTV (Jun 27, 2018 ~ )
- Japan
- Korea - Zhonghua TV (Dec 25, 2017 ~ )
- Thailand - GMM 25 (Jan 22, 2018 ~ )
- Cambodia

== Spin-off ==
Seeing the good reception of the main series, and the popularity of princes Yuan Che and Yuan Li, in the middle stage of Lost Love in Times the production crew started producing a side story, which was released on Youku on October 11, 2017 under the title Lost Love in Times Side Story: Exquisite Drunken Dream (Chinese: 醉玲珑番外之玲珑醉梦). The 12-episode web series serves as a continuation to the television series and focuses on the 11th prince Yuan Che and his love interest, Yin Caiqian, portrayed by Gong Jun and Xu Muchan respectively. Yuan Che, Yin Caiqian, Yuan Li, Mingyan, Yuan Hao, Zhang Shu, Yin Jianzheng and the Guardian of Nine Transformations return from Lost Love in Times, together with the following new characters:

- Gong Zhengnan as Mo Qingli, dark sorcerer and Yuan Li's childhood friend.
- Zhang Yang as Qing Bingling, dark sorceress and second chamberlain of the Jade Blood Chamber.
- Zhou Yanchen as Yi Huai, Che's personal guard and friend.
- Qiu Hui as Chen Mu, vice commander of Wei under Che's command.
- Tan Limin as Noble consort Su, Yuan Che and Yuan Li's mother.
