= Love of Thousand Years =

Chinese television series

- Promotional poster
- Genre: Xianxia; Romance
- Based on: Sanqian Ya Sha by Shi Silang
- Written by: Zhao Tianyou
- Directed by: Hui Yu
- Starring: Zheng Yecheng; Zhao Lusi
- Country of origin: China
- Original language: Mandarin
- No. of seasons: 1
- No. of episodes: 30

Production
- Producer: Lu Guoqiang
- Running time: 45 mins
- Production companies: Mango TV; New Power

Original release
- Network: Mango TV; Youku
- Release: March 19, 2020

Love of Thousand Years (simplified Chinese: 三千鸦杀; traditional Chinese: 三千鴉殺; pinyin: Sānqiān Yā Shā) is a 2020 Chinese television series based on the Web novel The Killing of Three Thousand Crows by Shi Silang. It stars Zheng Yecheng and Zhao Lusi.

== Synopsis ==
A story about a forbidden love that transcends a thousand years and ten lifetimes.

== Cast ==
- Zheng Yecheng as Fu Jiuyun
- Zhao Lusi as Qin Chuan / Ah Man
- Jiang Yiyi as Di Nü (Yan Yan)
- Liu Yitong as Zuo Zichen
- Wang Mengli as Xuan Zhu
- Dai Yunfan as Li Yuan
- Mao Fangyuan as Ting Yuan/Er Meng
- Wang Chunyuan as Xiangqu Mountain Master
- Zhang Xingzhe as Minister Zuo
- Li Luqi as Meishan Lord
- Li Mingjun as Bai Gongzi
- Xu Mengyuan as Cui Ya
- Ding Ziling as Madame Qiu Hua
- Guo Qiming as Guo Shi Nan Man Demon King
- Gao Jicai as Second prince
- Zhang Dingding as Qing Qing
- Lu Tingyu as Yi Xin
- Canti Lau as Bao An Emperor
- Qiao Hong as Queen of Li Kingdom
- Zhao Rui as Empress of Tian Yuan
- Jin Long as Emperor of Tian Yuan

== Soundtrack ==
No.	Title	Lyrics	Music	Singers	Length
1.	"Fleeting Flowers in a Timely Rain (昙花一现雨及时)" (Opening theme song)	Li Jin	Li Jin	Zhou Shen & Zheng Yunlong
2.	"Xu Xu (栩栩)"	Zuo Muxiu	Zuo Muxiu	Huang Shifu
3.	"Continue Writing (续写)"	Zhang Liao, Time Express	Bai Niao, Time Express	Li Xinyi
4.	"Person in the Trap (局中人)"	An Zhennan	An Zhennan	Deng Shen Me Jun

== International broadcast ==
Country	Network(s)/Station(s)	Series premiere	Title
China	Mango TV	March 19, 2020 - (Mango TV/Youku•VIP members: Members will be the first to watch 6 episodes; on April 10, episodes 23-30 will be on demand, Non-members: update two episodes every Thursday and Friday at 20:00)	三千鸦杀 ( ; lit: )
China	Youku	March 19, 2020 - (Mango TV/Youku•VIP members: Members will be the first to watch 6 episodes; on April 10, episodes 23-30 will be on demand, Non-members: update two episodes every Thursday and Friday at 20:00)	三千鸦杀 ( ; lit: )
Taiwan	LINE TV	March 31, 2020 - (Update every Friday and Saturday at 12 AM)	三千鸦杀 ( ; lit: )
Taiwan	LiTV	March 20, 2020 - (Update every Friday and Saturday at 12 AM)	三千鸦杀 ( ; lit: )
Vietnam	HTV7	June 12, 2020 - July 18, 2020 (Monday - Friday from 13.00 - 13.50)	Cùng chàng yên giấc đến bình minh
Thailand	Channel 9 MCOT HD (30)	October 18, 2020 - December 13, 2020 (Every Saturday and Sunday from 14.05 - 16.00); Saturday, October 31 And Saturday, December 12; No Broadcasting	ลิขิตรักสามพันปี ( ; lit: )
India	MX Player	Nov 2021 - Sep 2023 in Hindi & Other languages	Love Of Thousands Year's ( ;lit: )
