= 28th Golden Eagle Awards =

Chinese TV awards ceremony in 2016

The 28th Golden Eagle Awards (simplified Chinese: 第28届中国电视金鹰奖; traditional Chinese: 第28屆中國電視金鷹獎) ceremony was held in Changsha, Hunan, China, on October 16, 2016.

== Winners ==
| Best Television Series | Best Director |
|---|---|
| 10 Rides of Red Army; Ma Xiangyang Goes to the Countryside; All Quiet in Peking; Ordinary World; The Legend of Mi Yue; Tornado Girl; Deng Xiaoping at History's Crossroads; Wang Dahua's Revolutionary Career; Hey, Old Man!; Army One; Prison Break | Zheng Xiaolong–The Legend of Mi Yue/ Red Sorghum |
| Favorite Actor | Favorite Actress |
| Wang Lei–Ordinary World; Hu Ge–Nirvana in Fire | Tong Liya–Ordinary World; Zanilia Zhao–The Journey of Flower |
| Best Cinematography | Best Art Direction |
| Yu Fei/ Wang He/ Yang Haipeng –Red Sorghum | Liu Yongqi–In The Silence |
| Writing | Most Popular Actor(s) |
| Wen Haojie–Ordinary World | Hu Ge–Nirvana in Fire; Liu Tao–The Legend of Mi Yue |
