= Big Big Channel =

Big Big Channel is an online video platform operated by TVB, officially launched in July 2017. It was formerly TVB Network Vision (previously TVB Pay Vision) and was a satellite pay-television platform. The company was renamed Big Big Channel Limited on 23 May 2017, and the satellite pay-TV platform ceased operation on 1 June 2017. When the closure of the satellite pay-TV platform was announced in January 2017, online piracy and internet television were cited as some of the reasons.

The online platform targets younger viewers, and offers fans direct interaction with artists.

== History ==
TVB has noticed that the popularity of the Internet and mobile phones has changed the viewing habits of a new generation of viewers. With the rise of social networking platforms, artists (especially non-first- and second-line artists) need to gain more exposure, so they are keen on social platforms such as Facebook and Instagram and act as YouTubers. By advertising themselves on these platforms, individual artists become more role-oriented and opinion leaders, and even run product endorsements and online shopping to earn extra money. Therefore, TVB deliberately explored this section, allowing its artists to directly contact fans on this platform.

Big Big Channel officially launched its Android and iOS app on June 23, 2017, after a month of testing.

At present, the main layout of Big Big Channel is divided into nine categories: the most HIT, live, artists, talents, cooking shows, foraging, dressing, parenting and post-natal. In addition, the platform also has a "currency" system. Internet users can purchase virtual tokens for the purchase of virtual treasures for artists. However, some artists still do not know whether the proceeds are all owned by themselves or need to be divided into TVB. In addition, TVB will also arrange some series to be exclusively broadcast on this platform.

On May 7, 2018, their official online store, Big Big Shop, was launched.

== Controversy ==
Some people think that it is profitable to see social media on TV, and even the online rate is not missed. Individual TVB artists who promote on social media may need to reduce the exposure of other online platforms and create exclusive content for Big Big Channel.

On June 1, 2018, the Communications Authority announced that TVB indirectly promoted Big Big Channel in five programs to mix programing with advertisements; the Bureau received 37 complaints. The Communications Authority finally decided to impose a fine of HK$300,000 on TVB for the first four of the five complaints, and issued a serious warning to the TV for one of the five programs.

And because the channel Jade broadcast on Broadband TV showed one of the five complaints on the same day, the Communications Authority decided to advise Now Broadband TV.
