= TVB Network Vision =

Satellite pay-TV platform in Hong Kong

TVB Network Vision was previously known as TVB Pay Vision and was a satellite pay-television platform in Hong Kong provided by TVB. The company was renamed Big Big Channel Limited on 23 May 2017, and the satellite pay-TV platform ceased operation on 1 June 2017. When the closure of the satellite pay-TV platform was announced in January 2017, online piracy and internet television were cited as some of the reasons.

== Channel List ==
- TVB NV Info
- Super998
- TVB Good Show
