= An Yuexi =

Chinese actress

- Born: 10 June 1989 (age 37); Weifang, Shandong, China
- Education: Beijing Dance Academy
- Occupation: Actress
- Years active: 2012–present
- Agent(s): Beijing Xingbaoyuan Movie & TV

An Yuexi (Chinese: 安悦溪; born 10 June 1989) is a Chinese actress. She is known for her supporting roles as a worm in The Journey of Flower and a servant in Eternal Love; and her lead roles in The Whirlwind Girl 2 and Let's Shake It.

== Early life ==
An Yuexi studied at the Beijing Dance Academy, majoring in musical theater.

== Career ==
=== Beginnings ===
An Yuexi debuted as an actress in the television series Editorial Department Story, then went on to feature in the period drama To Elderly with Love the same year.

In 2013, she starred in the youth film Young Style alongside Dong Zijian. The film premiered at the Shanghai International Film Festival, which made her more known. The same year, she starred in the military drama Redgate Brothers, her first small-screen lead role.

In 2014, An starred in her first historical drama Cosmetology High. She also featured in modern drama Secrets of Women and spy drama The Stalker.

=== Rising popularity ===
In 2015, An played a supporting role in the xianxia drama The Journey of Flower. The drama was a massive hit and led to increased recognition for An. The same year, she was cast as in the film On Fallen Wings where she played two roles.

In 2016, An starred in the youth sports drama The Whirlwind Girl 2 alongside Ji Chang-wook.

In 2017, An co-starred in the fantasy romance drama Eternal Love; another massive hit. An's performance was recognized and praised by critics, leading to widespread recognition for her. The same year, An played the lead role in the comedy web drama Let's Shake It. The low budget series unexpectedly become popular and gained a cult following online, leading to a second season to be produced. The same year, she starred in the fantasy action series Rakshasa Street alongside Jiro Wang, as well as youth melodrama The Endless Love.

In 2018, An starred in the period romance drama Granting You a Dreamlike Life with Zhu Yilong.

In 2019, An starred in the romance drama Standing in The Time alongside Xing Zhaolin.

== Filmography ==
=== Film ===
Year	English title	Chinese title	Role	Notes
2013	Young Style	青春派	Huang Jingjing	
2017	On Fallen Wings	蝴蝶公墓	Bai Lu / Bai Shuang	

=== Television series ===
Year	English title	Chinese title	Role	Notes
2013	New Editorial Department Story	新编辑部故事	Li Ziguo	
2013	To Elderly with Love	老有所依	Xiao Li	
2014	Cosmetology High	美人制造	Ning'er	
2015	The Journey of Flower	花千骨	Tang Bao	
2015	Secrets of Women	女人的秘密	Gu Meimei	
2015	The Stalker	潜行者	Liu Xiaowan	
2016	Women Must be Stronger	女不强大天不容	Xiao Xu	
2016	Legend of the Concubinage	纳妾记第	Song Qing	
2016	The Whirlwind Girl 2	旋风少女第二季	Qi Baicao	
2017	Eternal Love	三生三世十里桃花	Shao Xin	
2017	Red Gate Brothers	红门兄弟	Qin Hao	
2017	Let's Shake It	颤抖吧，阿部！	Abu Chacha / Tang Qingye	
2017	Rakshasa Street	镇魂街	Xia Ling	
2017	The Endless Love	路从今夜白之遇见青春	Lu Youyan	
2018	Granting You a Dreamlike Life	许你浮生若梦	Lin Ruomeng / Duan Tianying / Lin Jingyun / Xia An'ni	
2018	Let's Shake It 2	颤抖吧阿部之朵星风云	Abu Chacha / Tang Qingye	
2019	Arsenal Military Academy	烈火军校	An Wen	
2019	Standing in the Time	不负时光	Lin Xia	
2020	The Legend of Taotie	饕餮记	Zhu Chengbi	
2021	A Young Couple	加油！小夫妻		
2022	Who Rules The World	且试天下	Hua Chunran	

== Discography ==
Year	English title	Chinese title	Album	Notes
2017	"Exclusive Love"	专属爱情	Let's Shake It OST	with Zheng Yecheng
2017	"Youths' Times"	年少的时光	The Endless Love OST	
2018	"Granting You a Dreamlike Life"	许你浮生若梦	Granting You a Dreamlike Life OST	with Zhu Yilong
2018	"Loving the Scenery"	恋恋风景	Let's Shake It 2 OST	with Zheng Yecheng
