= The Journey of Flower =

- Official Poster
- Also known as
- Simplified Chinese: 花千骨
- Hanyu Pinyin: Huā Qiāngǔ
- Genre: Xianxia; Romance
- Based on: Hua Qiangu by Fresh Guoguo
- Written by: Fresh Guoguo; Rao Jun
- Directed by: Lin Yufen; Danny Gao; Liang Shengquan
- Starring: Wallace Huo; Zhao Liying
- Theme music composer: Mak Chun Hung
- Opening theme: Fire of the Heart by F.I.R; Eternity by Alan Dawa Dolma
- Ending theme: Not To Mention by Wallace Huo and Zhao Liying
- Country of origin: China
- Original language: Mandarin
- No. of seasons: 1
- No. of episodes: 58 (TV); 50 (DVD)

Production
- Executive producer: Huang Xilong
- Producer: Tang Lijun
- Production locations: Guangxi, China; Hengdian World Studios, China
- Production company: Ciwen TV

Original release
- Network: Hunan TV
- Release: 9 June – 7 September 2015

The Journey of Flower (Chinese: 花千骨) is a 2015 Chinese television series starring Wallace Huo and Zhao Liying. It is based on the novel of the same name written by Fresh Guoguo, which is inspired from Daoist legends regarding the path to immortality. The series was broadcast on Hunan TV every Wednesday and Thursday for two episodes per day, from 9 June to 7 September 2015.

== Synopsis ==
Hua Qiangu (Zhao Liying) is an unlucky orphan born with a strange scent which attracts demons, and therefore is hated and feared by all the villagers. When she faces danger, she is saved by a man called Mo Bing, who is actually Bai Zihua in disguise. Bai Zihua (Wallace Huo) is a kind-hearted immortal who wants to protect all Earthly beings. The only heavenly tribulation in his life is actually Hua Qiangu, whom he is tasked to kill by his master. However, after witnessing her kind heart and foreseeing her tragic future, he spares her life.

In search of her benefactor, Hua Qiangu heads to Mount Chang Liu, a sect that trains their disciples into immortals. That He got there, just before the devil did killed the secret people and her master make her the new master of MT . Chang Liu .With the help of Bai Zihua, she passes through various trials to become his only disciple. As the two spend more time together, Hua Qiangu falls in love with her teacher. The Emperor of human realm and many other also falls in love with her .When Bai Zihua falls into danger, she embarked on a journey to retrieve the ten ancient artifacts in order to attain the Yanbing Jade that would save his life. This causes the Demon God to be revived. The Demon God transfers all his power into her body afterwards, and Hua Qiangu falls into the world of Emptiness. She unleashes the Great Desolate Energy Force to become the new ruler of the Demons. Bai Zihua tries to steer her towards the righteous path, and comes to her side alone to accompany her. When Hua Qiangu realizes Bai Zihua's true feelings for her, she decided to let herself be killed by him to restore peace to the world. All of her friends understand that they under mistake her. After Hua Qiangu dies, Bai Zihua feels extremely remorseful. One of the three masters from Changliu, Mo Yan, decided to use the power of nature to exchange his life for hers and restored her. In the end, Bai Zihua decides to leave Changliu to take care of Hua Qiangu.

== Cast ==
=== Main ===
- Wallace Huo as Bai Zihua
  - Chang Liu's Sect Leader and the head of all immortals. He is tasked to protect the magical realm of Chang Liu. He appears to be outwardly cold and heartless, but he cares for Hua Qiangu deeply. However, he has to hide his emotions because of his sense of propriety.
- Zhao Liying as Hua Qiangu
  - The last descendant of Goddess Nuwa. She has a unique scent on her body, which attracts demons. When she was born, she causes all the flowers around her to wilt, and therefore she was named "Thousand Bones of Flower". She comes to Chang Liu, and becomes Bai Zihua's only disciple. She is also the fated calamity of Bai Zihua.

=== Supporting ===
==== Chang Liu Sect ====
- Shen Baoping as Reverend, previous sect leader of Chang Liu. Bai Zihua's teacher.
- Jiang Yiming as Mo Yan
  - Chang Liu's Shi Zun, Bai Zihua's senior. He is a strict and unyielding man who protects Bai Zihua and dislikes Hua Qiangu. He died after sacrificing his life to revive Hua Qiangu after discovering her kindness.
- Miao Chi as Sheng Xiaomo
  - Chang Liu's Ru Zun, Bai Zihua's junior. He kindly treated Hua Qiangu with concern as an elder.
- Hou Yehua as Tao Weng, head librarian of Chang Liu.
- Dong Chunhui as Luo Shiyi
  - Mo Yan's senior disciple. He is a kind-hearted and fair man who helps protect Chang Liu. He likes Tang Bao.
- Li Hanyang as Li Meng
  - Disciple of Chang Liu. Bai Zihua's attendant. He witnessed Bai Zihua going crazed and biting/kissing Hua Qiangu, and was later silenced by Mo Yan.
- Li Chun as Ni Mantian
  - Princess of Penglai. Disciple of Luo Shiyi. She is a proud and haughty girl, and gets jealous when Hua Qiangu becomes Bai Zihua's disciple. She likes Shuo Feng, and is angered by his protectiveness toward Hua Qiangu. She died while trying to absorb the desolate force from Hua Qiangu.
- Bao Tianqi as Qing Shui
  - Princess of Zhou Kingdom. She is a good friend of Hua Qiangu. She falls in love with Meng Xuanlang, and later left Chang Liu to stay with him. She was jealous of Meng Xuanlang's affections toward Hua Qiangu, and tried to prevent Tang Bao being saved. After Tang Bao's death, she lost her memories due to the guilt she felt and becomes a crazed woman.
- Xu Haiqiao as Meng Xuanlang
  - Second prince of the Shu Kingdom, later the Emperor. He has no interest in court affairs, and becomes a special disciple of Chang Liu. He likes Hua Qiangu, and protects her when she is being bullied by fellow sect mates. Later, because of his kingdom, he has no choice but to leave Chang Liu. After Qing Shui lost her memories, he stays by her side to take care of her.
- Jiang Yang as Shuo Feng
  - A highly skilled expert of unknown origins. Disciple of Luo Shiyi. His true identity is a jade fragment spirit, destined to assist Hua Qiangu in gathering 10 immortal devices. He likes Ni Mantian, despite going against her multiple times in order to protect Hua Qiangu.
- Zhang Zhengyan as Huo Xi, disciple of Sheng Xiaomo. He likes Wu Qingluo.
- Lu Jiyi as Wu Qingluo, disciple of Sheng Xiaomo. She likes Huo Xi.
- Gong Zhengnan as Zhu Ran
  - Son of Mo Yan and a demon from the Seven Murder Factions. In order to obtain the immortal devices, he manipulated Liu Xia using her love for him. After that, he was banished to the wild barrens as punishment.
- Lu Ziyi as Yin Youruo, daughter of Yin Hongyuan. Hua Qiangu's disciple.

==== Seven Murder Factions ====
- Ma Ke as Sha Qianmo
  - Demon Lord of the Seven Murder Factions. He is said to be the most beautiful man of all six realms. He treated Hua Qiangu as a replacement for his deceased younger sister and dotes on her, but later falls in love with her and died trying to save Hua Qiangu from Savage territory.
- Ruan Weijing as Shan Chunqiu, custodian of Law. Sha Qianmo's most loyal follower.
- Wang Xiuze as Kuang Yetian, a demon adept at traps. Shan Chunqiu's loyal follower.
- Du Zheyu as Yin Shangpiao, Shan Chunqiu's disciple, who is planted as a spy at Chang Liu. He was killed by Ni Mantian.
- Li Shanyu as Buo Ruohua, a demon adept at using poisons. Shan Chunqiu's follower.
- Li Qian as Liu Xia, Sha Qianmo's deceased younger sister. She loves Zhu Ran, but was used by him, and later committed suicide out of sorrow.

==== Immortals and alliance of Chang Liu ====
- Jiang Xin as Xia Zixun
  - 1 of the 5 immortals, who is in charge of the Heavenly Court's spices. She has a one-sided love for Bai Zihua. She becomes crazed when Bai Zihua does not reciprocate her love, and turned into a demon. She died after transferring all of her energy to Bai Zihua.
- Yang Shuo as Tan Fan, 1 of the 5 immortals. He loves Xia Zixun, and later saves her life by sacrificing his.
- Zeng Hongchang as Wu Gou
  - 1 of the 5 immortals, leader of Lotus City. He fell in love with Yun Ya, his fated calamity, and committed many murders to revenge her death.
- Qian Yongchen as Dong Hua
  - 1 of the 5 immortals. He felt guilty toward Dongfang Yuqing for accidentally killing his father, and stayed by his side to make amendments to him. He was later accidentally killed by Dongfang Yuqing while protecting Bai Zihua.
- Zhao Chulun as Wen Shufeng, sect leader of Yu Zhuo Peak.
- Yan Hanqing as Yin Hongyuan, sect leader of Tian Shan.
- Shi Jiantao as Luo Hedong, an immortal of Kun Lun Sect. Dongfang Yuqing's teacher.
- Li Jinzhe as Fei Yan, sect leader of Tai Bai. He was killed by Wu Guo as revenge for Yun Ya's death.

Mt Shu Sect

- Gao Hai as Yun Yin, Senior disciple of Mt Shu. He became the sect leader of Mt Shu after Hua Qiangu.
- Gao Jiang as Yun Yi
  - Yun Yun's younger twin brother. He suffers a curse because he was not born as the first son. He betrayed Mt Shu and joined the Seven Murder Factions to restore his disfigured face. He committed suicide using the Pity Sword.
- Zhang Shuangli as Reverend Qingxu
  - Previous sect leader of Mt Shu. He saved Hua Qiangu's life when she was young, and died after passing the sect leader position to Hua Qiangu.
- Dan Ni as Qing Feng, Elder of Mt Shu.
- Lin Yizheng as Qing Yang, Elder of Mt Shu.

Kingdom of Shu

- Kang Lei as Meng Xuancong
  - Meng Xuanlang's rebellious older brother. He was used by Seven Murder Factions because he wants to usurp the throne, and later killed by Shan Chunqiu.
- Na Jiacheng as Lie Xingyun, loyal general of the Shu kingdom.
- Li Qi as Emperor, Meng Xuanlang's father.

Penglai Island

- Liu Bo as Ni Qianzhang, Sect leader of Peng Lai, Ni Maintain's father. He is killed by Shan Chunqiu, and the blame was shifted to Hua Qiangu.
- Shen Xuewei as Jin Quan, Ni Mantian's uncle. He was killed by Ni Mantian after finding out she practiced forbidden martial arts.

Shao Bai Sect

- Wang Yehua as Yan Tingsha, Sect Leader of Shao Bai. She was killed by Wu Guo as revenge for Yun Ya's death.
- Yang Anqi as Wei Xi, disciple of Shao Bai.
- Shen Yu as Mei'er, Disciple of Shao Bai. Good friend of Yun Ya. She was killed by Wu Guo as revenge for Yun Ya's death.

=== Others ===
- Zhang Danfeng as Dongfang Yuqing
  - Lord of Strange Decay. He possesses the ability to know everything from the past. He hates Bai Zihua for killing his father, and plans to use Hua Qiangu's special fate to plot against him. However, he fell in love with Hua Qiangu after getting to know her, and eventually died while protecting her from Mo Yan.
- An Yuexi as Tang Bao
  - A ginx worm originated from Strange Decay pavilion and formed by Hua Qiangu's blood. She changes into human form after she was agitated by Ni Mantian. She likes Luo Shiyi.
- Li Cheng as Lu Qiao, loyal follower of Dongfang Yuqing. She died while helping Hua Qiangu to retrieve the ten ancient artifacts.
- Zheng Yecheng as Nan Xianyue
  - Previous demon lord and leader of the Seven Murder Factions. He was rescued by Hua Qiangu when the 10 immortal devices are restored. Later, his death was faked with the help of Bai Zihua and he becomes an ordinary citizen.
- Sun Gelu as Yun Ya
- A palace maid at Lotus City.
  - Wu Gou's lover and fated calamity. She was abetted by her friend Mei'er to steal a treasure, and was killed by various sect leaders.
- Wang Jiusheng as Hua Qiangu's father. He died of illness.

== Production ==
Fresh Guoguo, the writer of the novel, was recruited to be one of the scriptwriters of the drama. Academy Award nominee Chung Munhai, who was the costume designer of the movie Curse of the Golden Flower was also recruited on set. The 3D effects are handled by the company Prime Focus.

The shooting of the drama started on 6 May 2014, in Guangxi, China and was wrapped up on 14 September 2014 in Hengdian World Studios, China. The preliminary work started one and a half years ago, including choosing of outdoor scene locations and building filming sites in scenic spots in Guangxi.

== Soundtrack ==
Title	Singer
Cannot Say (不可说)	Wallace Huo & Zhao Liying
Fire of the Heart (心之火)	F.I.R feat. Julia Peng
Eternity (千古)	Alan Dawa Dolma
End of Time (地老天荒)	Andy Zhang
Annual Ring (年轮)	Zhang Bichen
The Night (是夜)	Mao Fangyuan

== Reception ==
Two versions of a three-minute short trailer, one in Chinese and the other dubbed in English, were released online, receiving more than 280 million views on Weibo and becoming one of the hottest topics on social media. In October 2014, two longer trailers dubbed in both Chinese and English language were released in Cannes, France, and received an overwhelming response.

The drama was a huge commercial success in China, with an average rating of 2.784% (CMS50) and 2.213% (nationwide), becoming the second highest rated drama of 2015. It also became the first Chinese drama to surpass 20 billion online views. A licensed mobile game was also released, and brought in more than 10 million active players and 200 million yuan in revenue in its first two months.

In 2016, The Journey of Flower was featured on the New York Times.

== Awards and nominations ==
Year	Award	Category	Nominee	Result	Ref.
2015	iQiyi All-Star Carnival	Drama of the Year	The Journey of Flower	Won	
2015	iQiyi All-Star Carnival	Most Popular Actor	Wallace Huo	Won	
2015	iQiyi All-Star Carnival	Most Popular Actress	Zhao Liying	Won	
2015	7th China TV Drama Awards	Top Ten Television Series	The Journey of Flower	Won	
2015	7th China TV Drama Awards	Audience's Favorite Character	Bai Zihua (Wallace Huo)	Won	
2015	7th China TV Drama Awards	Best New Actor	Ma Ke	Won	
2015	6th Macau International Television Festival	Best Actress	Zhao Liying	Won	
2016	2015 Conference on Big Data Index on Culture and Entertainment Industry	Audience's Favourite TV Character	Bai Zihua (Wallace Huo)	Won	
2016	19th Huading Awards	Best Actor	Wallace Huo	Nominated	
2016	19th Huading Awards	Best Actress (Ancient)	Zhao Liying	Nominated	
2016	19th Huading Awards	Best Producer	Tang Lijun	Nominated	
2016	22nd Shanghai Television Festival	Best Drama	The Journey of Flower	Nominated	
2016	22nd Shanghai Television Festival	Best Actress	Zhao Liying	Nominated	
2016	28th China TV Golden Eagle Award	Audience's Choice for Actress	Zhao Liying	Won	
2016	11th China Golden Eagle TV Art Festival	Most Popular Actress	Zhao Liying	Nominated	
2017	11th National Top-Notch Television Production Award Ceremony	Outstanding Television Series		Won	

== International broadcast ==
- Taiwan - CTi Variety, CTV, KKTV
- Cambodia - Rasmey Hang Meas HDTV
- Vietnam - HTV3, ZingTV, VTV5 Tây Nguyên, BPTV1 (Bình Phước Radio - Television - Newspaper)
- Thailand - PPTV
- Malaysia - 8TV, ntv7
- Singapore - Mediacorp Channel 8

Country	Network(s)/Station(s)	Series premiere	Title
China	Hunan TV	9 June 2015 – 7 September 2015 (Diamond Solo Theater, Two episodes broadcast every Tuesday and Wednesday 22:00-24:00 From 5 July, it will be changed to two episodes every Sunday and Monday 22:00-24:00)	花千骨 ( ; lit: )
China	GRT	25 November 2015 (19:30-21:00 every night)	花千骨 ( ; lit: )
China	CCTV-8	5 July 2016 (Four episodes broadcast daily at 12:30)	花千骨 ( ; lit: )
China	ZJTV	2 July 2017 (Four episodes broadcast daily at 07:50)	花千骨 ( ; lit: )
China	HEBTV	27 January 2018 (Daily broadcast of four episodes at 08:10)	花千骨 ( ; lit: )
Taiwan	CTi Variety	1 December 2015 – 8 February 2016 ()	花千骨 ( ; lit: )
Taiwan	CTV	1 December 2015 – 8 February 2016 ()	花千骨 ( ; lit: )
Taiwan	KKTV	2015 ()	花千骨 ( ; lit: )
Taiwan	EYE TV	16 February 2016 – 22 March 2016 (Golden Powder Theater Times Drama Every Monday to Friday 19:00-20:00 From 17 January 2016, every Monday to Friday 18:00-20:00)	花千骨 ( ; lit: )
Cambodia	Rasmey Hang Meas HDTV	2016 ()	( ; lit: )
Vietnam	HTV3; ZingTV	2016 ()	( ; lit: )
(Thailand) Siam	PPTVHD36	15 February 2016 – 17 June 2016 (Every Monday to Friday, 5: 20-18: 50)	ตำนานรักเหนือภพ The Journey of Flower ( ; lit: )
Hong Kong	TVB Network VisionChinese Drama	24 February 2017 – 4 May 2017 (from Monday to Friday 11:45-12:45, 15:15-16:15, 18:00-18:45, 19:30-20:30 and 22:30-23:30)	花千骨 ( ; lit: )
Taiwan	MOD 306	7 April 2017 – 11 May 2017 (Monday to Friday 23:30-01:30)	花千骨 ( ; lit: )
Malaysia	8TV	7 April 2017 – 11 May 2017 (Monday to Friday 18:00-19:00)	花千骨 ( ; lit: )
Malaysia	8TV	4 August 2017 – 12 October 2017 (Monday to Friday 18:00-19:00)	花千骨 ( ; lit: )
Singapore	Mediacorp Channel 8	2017 ()	花千骨 ( ; lit: )
Taiwan	MOD 306	7 April 2017 (Monday to Friday 23:30-01:30 (Broadcast in Taiwanese))	花千骨 ( ; lit: )
Taiwan	EBC	10 August 2017 (Every Monday to Friday at 22:00)	花千骨 ( ; lit: )
Hong Kong	TVBTVB Jade	10 July 2020 – 18 September 2020 (Monday to Friday 10:30-11:30 (if the day is a public holiday, the show will be suspended) (the show will be suspended on 19 August))	花千骨 ( ; lit: )
