= Let's Shake It =

- Genre: Science fiction Romantic comedy
- Based on: Shake It, ET by Zifeng Diuzi
- Written by: Rao Jun (Season 1); Liu Ya (Season 1–2); Zhu Yi (Season 1); Hong Jinghui (Season 1); Zhou Bihui (Season 2); Li Zhenru (Season 2); Zhang Minjun (Season 2); Ge Zhensong (Season 2); Di Mo (Season 2)
- Directed by: Zhao Xiaoxi, Zhao Xiaoou (Season 1); Wang Yan, Wang Xiaoying (Season 2)
- Starring: Zheng Yecheng; An Yuexi
- Country of origin: China
- Original language: Mandarin
- No. of episodes: 25 (Season 1); 26 (Season 2)

Production
- Producers: Tang Lijun (Season 1–2); Yuan Yumei (Season 1); Li Yongjie (Season 2)
- Production locations: Xiangshan; Hengdian World Studios
- Running time: 40 mins
- Production companies: Youku; New iPicture

Original release
- Network: Youku (Season 1); Mango TV (Season 2)
- Release: 7 August 2017

Let's Shake It (Chinese: 颤抖吧, 阿部!; pinyin: Chàndǒu ba, ābù!; lit. 'Shake it', 'Abu!') is a 2017 Chinese web series starring Zheng Yecheng and An Yuexi. It follows the story of an alien, Abu, who assumes the identity of Tang Qingye after accidentally landing on Earth, and her subsequent involvement with Tang Qingfeng. The series aired on Youku on 7 August 2017.

The series was a commercial success, with a total of 2 billion views online and a rating of 7.8 on Douban. Its popularity was said to be due to its light-heartened and humorous content, as well as its inclusion of a mixture of unique elements like aliens, time-travel and inter-racial relationships. The series was also praised for its use of high-quality special effects.

The second season, Trouble on Planet Duo airs on Mango TV on September 27, 2018.

== Synopsis ==
=== Season 1 ===
During the reign of Emperor Daizong of Tang, there is unrest on the border. The Emperor awards the sixth prince, Li Yi by making him the Crown Prince and betrothing Tang Qingye to him. However, Lady Tang, upset that the daughter of a concubine is to become the Crown Princess, has Qingye replaced by her own daughter, Tang Qingyun, and sends assassins after Qingye. Simultaneously, Abu Chacha of Planet Duo, who lands on Earth, is forced to assume the identity of Tang Qingye, thus beginning her fated love-hate relationship with Tang Qingfeng.

=== Season 2 ===
After Tang Qingfeng wakes up, he finds out he was captured by The Time Keepers for messing up timelines. Abu, Tang Qingfeng, and Duo Meow tries to go back to the Tang dynasty to make things right again, but accidentally return to the Sui dynasty instead. With the help of the young Tang father, they must now try to fix history or the Tang dynasty will never exist.

== Cast ==
=== Main ===
- Zheng Yecheng as Tang Qingfeng

The eldest son of Tang Jizhong and Lady Tang. As Chang'an's leading talent, Qingfeng is handsome and reliable. Despite Qingye's sudden change in temperament, he cannot bear to treat her harshly. He often finds Abu's strange actions dumbfounding.

- An Yuexi as Abu Chacha / Tang Qingye

Abu Chacha: A lively alien who disrupted the order of the universe. In order to adapt to life on Earth, she is caught up in many incidents, becoming frenemies with Qingfeng in the process.
Qingye: The second daughter of Tang Jizhong, by his concubine.

=== Season 1 ===
==== Aliens ====
- Wang Yanyang as Duo Miaomiao. Captain of Planet Duo's star fleet. Because of the failure of his aircraft, he is forced to land on Earth. He fell for Xiao Ruyi in the process of solving crimes with her.
- Zhu Ziyan as Jile. Alien Elder.

==== Imperial Family ====
- Zhao Dongze as Li Yi. The Crown Prince. He deceitfully hides his true intentions due to a tragic childhood in the palace. In order to gain the throne, he does not hesitate to collude with the enemy and reignite the war on the border.
- Chen Yisha as the Empress.
- Gao Hai as Li Fu. The Prince of Qi, Li Yi's elder brother.

==== Tang Family ====
- Chen Chen as Tang Qingyun. The eldest daughter of Tang Jizhong, by Lady Tang. Beneath her gentle facade is someone full of tenacity. She has loved Li Yi since childhood.
- Yang Taoge as Dabao. Tang Qingfeng's lieutenant.
- Wang Gang as Tang Jizhong. General.
- Tian Miao as Lady Tang. Tang Jizhong's wife.
- Huang Yuecheng as Xiang'er. Tang Qingye's personal maid.

==== Xiao Family ====
- Xu Hao as Xiao Ruyi. The Right General of the Jinwu Guard. Beneath her unsmiling facade is someone longing for affection.
- Wu Hao as Xiao Zhihe. Xiao Ruyi's younger brother.

=== Season 2 ===
- Xu Jiawei as Duo Miaomiao
- Xu Muchan as Duo Xingxing
- Ning Xiaohua as Judge
- Lu Feng as Immortal
- Wu Peirou as Xiao Ba

== Soundtrack ==
No.	Title	Lyrics	Music	Singer	Length
1.	"Loving You is Not Bad (爱你也不差)" (Opening theme song)	Li Yang	Mak Chun Hung	Wu Yanqing
2.	"Only Belong to Love (专属爱情)" (Ending theme song)	Li Ruotian	Ma Ping	Zheng Yecheng & An Yuexi
3.	"Waiting For You"	Tang Dou	ZigZag Note	Wang Xiaomin
4.	"Waiting For Love (等待爱)"	Ting Hai	Qian Lei	Ning Hengyu
5.	"Shaking (颤抖)"	Lin Qiao	Qian Dachuan	Mao Fangyuan
6.	"Say You Love Me (说你爱我)"	Qian Lijing	Mak Chun Hung	Wu Yanshan
7.	"Light Wind Arrived (清风来过)"	Gong Shujun	Yi Rui	Gong Shujun & Ding Shaohua
8.	"Plastic Surgery Monster (整容怪)"	Tang Dou	M80	Shanghai Rap
