= Liu Yuxin =

Chinese actress and model

- Born: March 13, 1988 (age 38); Hengyang, Hunan, China
- Other name: Yoyo Liu
- Education: Central Academy of Drama
- Occupations: Actress, model
- Years active: 2005–present
- Spouse: Li Meng (2009–2015)
- Children: 1

Chinese name
- Traditional Chinese: 劉雨欣
- Simplified Chinese: 刘雨欣
Transcriptions
Standard Mandarin
- Hanyu Pinyin: Liú Yǔxīn

Liu Yuxin (born March 13, 1988) also known as Yoyo Liu, is a Chinese actress, model, and producer. She is best known for her role as Gororo Mingyu in the 2011 television series Scarlet Heart. She graduated from the Central Academy of Drama.

== Career ==
In 2009, Liu played the Princess of Rouran in the Chinese live action film, Mulan. In 2011, she played Gororo Mingyu in the series, Scarlet Heart. In 2016, Liu played Ding Fei in the television show, Far Away Love. She later played Qiang Wei in Switch of Fate. In 2020, Liu played Ji Heng in Eternal Love of Dream, which was the sequel to the 2017 series, Eternal Love.

Liu is also a producer at Stars Collective in the United States, which was founded in 2020. Stars Collective Films Entertainment Group was founded by CEO Peter Luo of Starlight Media (Starlight Culture Entertainment) who financed films such as Crazy Rich Asians and Marshall. Liu worked on films including Wuhan Wuhan, Umma, Jamojaya, and The Garfield Movie.

The short-lived American sitcom Selfie (2014), better known as 再造淑女 in Chinese, gained popularity in China through social media in 2021. Liu posted an image of the main actors, Karen Gillan and John Cho on March 17, 2023. She later mentioned she is in talks of a Selfie movie sequel. In January 2024, Liu was asked if there's a chance for Selfie to return, she replied that Warner Brothers will not release the copyright, but she will try her best to communicate with the original cast and crew to create another story.

In January 2025, it was reported that Liu will be a producer for the film, Stop Stop Dark Cold.

== Personal life ==
Liu bought and owned the rights of the novel, Three Lives Three Worlds, The Pillow Book, and had wanted to play the role of Feng Jiu. However, after the television drama series based on the novel, Eternal Love (2017) became popular following its broadcast, audiences condemned her decision and rallied for Dilraba Dilmurat to play Feng Jiu instead. Following this, netizens had speculations that Liu attempted suicide in August 2018 that was related to her divorce from her husband, who had cheated on her with actress Zhang Meng while Liu was pregnant. Liu denied rumors of suicide and stated that she had trouble sleeping and relied on sleeping pills. She later sold the rights of the book to Tencent Video, who cast her as Ji Heng in the series sequel, Eternal Love of Dream (2020) instead and made her one of the co-producers. Criticism of her performance led to speculations of attempted suicide again.

Liu temporarily changed her name from Liu Yuxin to Liu Yuefei. She currently uses the name Liu Yuxin in China along with her English name, Yoyo Liu in the U.S.

== Filmography ==
=== Film ===
Year	English title	Chinese title	Role	Notes
2009	Hua Mulan	花木兰	Rouran princess	
2011	Energy Behind the Heart	用心跳	Xiao Hong	
2011	Legend of Daming Palace	大明宫传奇	Princess Mingyue	
2013	Baby Run	宝贝快跑	Xiao Bao	
2014	Turn Around	美人邦	Yu Zhongqiu	
2016	So Lucky	杠上开花	Chun Ling	

=== Television series ===
Year	English title	Chinese title	Role	Notes
2006		色拉青春	Leng Xue	
2009	Ugly Betty II	丑女无敌II	Ziwei	
2010	Special War Pioneer	特战先锋	Hudie	
2011		大学生士兵	Jiang Nan	
2011		毕业时刻	Bai Xue	
2011	Scarlet Heart	步步惊心	Gororo Mingyu	
2012	Secret History of Princess Taiping	太平公主秘史	Wu Zetian (young adult)	
2012	King's War	楚汉传奇	Concubine Qi	
2015		情诫	Xiao Qi	
2015	The Cage of Love	抓住彩虹的男人	Lu Man	
2016	Far Away Love	远得要命的爱情	Ding Fei	
2016	Switch of Fate	忍冬艳蔷薇	Gu Qiangwei	
2016	How Much Love Can be Repeated	多少爱，可以重来	Wang Qiaoqiao	
2016		硝烟散尽	Dong Li'na	
2020	Eternal Love of Dream	三生三世枕上书	Ji Heng	
2025	Memories beyond Horizon	无限超越班	As herself	Season 3

=== Producer ===
Year	Title	Role	Notes
2021	Wuhan Wuhan	Co-producer	
2022	Umma	Co-producer	
2023	Jamojaya	Assistant producer	
2024	The Garfield Movie	Associate producer	

== Awards and nominations ==
Liu's film, Wuhan Wuhan was nominated for Outstanding Current Affairs Documentary featured in the POV series at the 44th News & Documentary Emmy Awards.
