= Three Lives Three Worlds, The Pillow Book =

2012 Chinese fantasy novel

Three Lives, Three Worlds: The Pillow Book
- First editions
- Author: Tang Qi Gong Zi (唐七公子)
- Language: Mandarin
- Genre: Action, Romance, Fantasy, Xianxia
- Publisher: Hunan Literature and Art Publishing House
- Publication date: 2012 and 2013
- Publication place: China
- Preceded by: Three Lives, Three Worlds: Ten Miles of Peach Blossoms
- Followed by: Three Lives, Three Worlds: The Step Lotus; Three Lives, Three Worlds: The Bodhi Fate

The Pillow Book (simplified Chinese: 三生三世枕上书; traditional Chinese: 三生三世枕上書; pinyin: Sānshēng Sānshì Zhěnshàng Shū), written by Tang Qi Gong Zi, is the second book in the Three Lives, Three Worlds series. This Chinese novel consists of two books, and the first volume was initially published in 2012 by the Hunan Literature and Art Publishing House, followed by the second volume in 2013. The books describe the love story between the nine-tailed fox queen of Qing Qiu, Bai Feng Jiu, and the first ruler of Heaven, Dong Hua Di Jun, spanning across three lives in three worlds.

According to Tang Qi Gong Zi, she wrote the series after wondering why people are so fascinated with immortality, and questioning what the world would be like if everyone can live such a long life.

The original books have been translated by fans and professionals into many languages such as Thai, English, and Vietnamese.

== Plot ==
Book One: Upper Volume

"If perseverance will still be in vain, who would use up this entire life only to wait for an unobtainable love?"

Part One: The Reborn Bodhi Vines

The story begins with the wedding between Qing Qiu's Queen, Bai Qian, and the Heavenly Clan's Crown Prince, Ye Hua. Dong Hua and Mo Yuan, Ye Hua's twin brother and Bai Qian's teacher, came along with the wedding parade to receive the bride back to the groom's home for marriage, and here is where Dong Hua and Feng Jiu officially meet for the first time. After that, the story moves to heaven, where a banquet is held for the married couple, and after seeing Feng Jiu blame Mi Gu for the crime of kicking a flower pot toward his head, Dong Hua begins to take interest in her.

Later, Bai Qian set Feng Jiu up on a blind date with a celestial fairy of Heaven. Not willing to marry, Feng Jiu drove her date away and mistook Dong Hua for Mi Gu. She then began reminiscing to him about Ye Qing Ti, her deceased mortal husband.

On the last day of Lian Song's Flower Festival, Feng Jiu took her cousin, Ah Li, to see a play. On the way, Ah Li became tired and the two took a rest. Soon after, Princess Zhi He, Dong Hua's adopted sister's, carriage ascended from the lower realm and some celestials began gossiping about why she was banished to the mortal realm.

Arriving at Cheng Tian Terrace, Feng Jiu fought with a Chi Yan (Red Flame) Beast, and Dong Hua ended up saving her. Rumors circulated throughout the Heavens about Dong Hua, Zhi He, and Feng Jiu. Lian Song came to Dong Hua to confirm these rumors and said that if Dong Hua wanted to take a wife, Zhi He is not a bad choice.

Escaping from a party she was forced to attend, Feng Jiu decided to take a late-night bath. Not long after, Dong Hua appeared and draped his cloak over her just as Lian Song came. Another rumor started out, this time saying that Dong Hua kept a beauty in his palace. Realizing that she lost the bracelet Qing Ti had given her, Feng Jiu went to find Dong Hua to inquire about it. However, she went at the wrong time, causing Dong Hua to tease her in front of the newly ascended immortals. Thus, another rumor started, mistaking Feng Jiu for Zhi He.

Tian Jun, the emperor of Heaven, decided to hold a party for the newly ascended fairies and, wanting to please Dong Hua, he announced that Zhi He will be returning to Heaven. Zhi He silently provoked Feng Jiu into remembering the time she was bullied while acting as a maid at Dong Hua's Palace. To forget her painful memories, Feng Jiu got drunk and Dong Hua brought her back to her room, causing another rumor to circulate.

No longer able to face the crowd, Feng Jiu instructed Ah Li to be her eyes and ears. While waiting for Ah Li to report back, Feng Jiu turned into a handkerchief to avoid another scandal with Dong Hua. Knowing full well that it was her, Dong Hua took Feng Jiu to his battle with Yan Chi Wu, a demon lord whom Dong Hua thought kidnapped his favorite pet fox long ago. During the battle, Chi Wu summoned a cyclone that swept both him and Feng Jiu away.

The two ended up at a valley and, thinking that Feng Jiu is Dong Hua's lover, Chi Wu started telling her about Dong Hua and Ji Heng, Dong Hua's former fiancée's, love story.

Part Two: Fan Yin Valley

Later, the two ended up meeting the second prince of the Bi Yi Niao (Adjoin-Winged Birds), Xiang Li Meng, and was mistaken for the prince and princess of the Owl Clan. They stayed in Fan Yin Valley for half a year before Dong Hua came. Upon meeting, Feng Jiu made him turn into a handkerchief to quench her anger for his tardiness, but later found out from Chi Wu that Dong Hua tricked her again, and that he didn't come to save her, but was here to coax Ji Heng back.

Hearing about the Saha fruit that could revive mortals, Feng Jiu decided to enter the tournament to win it in order to revive Ye Qing Ti, only to find that her name was not on the list of participants. Thus, she got Chi Wu to help her steal the fruit only to run into Dong Hua having a battle with a demoness. Feng Jiu got involved and ended up stuck inside a barrier with Dong Hua. The next day, Chi Wu told her that he was changing residence with Dong Hua.

Knowing that Feng Jiu wanted the Saha fruit, Dong Hua got her name into the list of competitors and in thanks, Feng Jiu rented out a restaurant to treat him. However, the next day, Feng Jiu found herself confined and Dong Hua told her that he did this so that he could train her for the tournament.

Later, Chi Wu came and took Feng Jiu out to comfort Xiang Li Meng, who was sad over the death of his pet cricket. His cousin, Jie Lu, explained that the cricket was a gift that Feng Jiu had given Xiang Li Meng when he was little.

When she returned, Feng Jiu found the barrier stronger and that Dong Hua seemed distracted. Finally, the day of the tournament arrived, and Feng Jiu won first place, but was told that Dong Hua had given the Saha fruit to Ji Heng. Ji Heng said that she asked for the fruit to test Dong Hua's love for her and asked Feng Jiu not to come in between them. Thus, Feng Jiu was forced into stealing the fruit. She successfully obtained the fruit, but was surrounded by four pythons before she fainted from pain. Doug Hua went back to Heaven with a red fox that he had saved to get treatment.

Back in Heaven, Zhong Lin noticed that Dong Hua was not his usual self ever since he returned from Fan Lin Valley. Example, in deep thoughts when he held a book up (not reading it), not waiting for the water to boil on his tea and asking Zhong Lin funny question like how to get rid of a person without other people knowing it. Lian Song came to see Dong Hua and told him that Feng Jiu is the beloved pet fox that Dong Hua has searched the world for. Later, Chi Wu angrily came and scolded Dong Hua for causing Feng Jiu's life to be in danger. Hearing this, Dong Hua quickly left and was relieved when he found that Feng Jiu was still alive inside the python formation. The Bi Yi Niao's Queen told Dong Hua that Feng Jiu is stuck inside of Aranya's Dream, and Dong Hua entered the formation to rescue her.

Book Two: Lower Volume

"In the middle of a foggy dream, one walks through whose shadow, destroys whose yearnings, and buries whose current life and past life?"

Part Three: Aranya

The Second book began with revealing that the reason why Dong Hua appeared distracted the last few days was, because he was trying to find ways to get rid of Chi Wu without drawing blood, and later realized that he was in love with Feng Jiu.

Outside Aranya's Dream, Chi Wu took Ji Heng back and she cried, saying that she regretted her earlier decisions and revealed that the only reason Dong Hua agreed to marry her was because her father, Meng Hao, a water dragon who served under Dong Hua, had begged him to help her before he died.

Back inside the formation, Feng Jiu woke and kissed Dong Hua, thinking that she was dreaming. Once she realized that it wasn't a dream, Dong Hua told her that they were married, and that she had amnesia, as she only remembered the events that happened 70 years ago. Due to injuries, Feng Jiu fell asleep again, and Dong Hua placed her body inside an ice coffin while taking her soul into the Dream World to recuperate.

Feng Jiu woke and found that she is in the body of Aranya, the second princess of the Bi Yi Niao. She ran into Chen Ye, the Archmage, while trying to escape Prince Qing, a snake that Aranya raised. She later found out from her maid, Cha Cha, that Aranya doesn't have a good relationship with Chen Ye. Cha Cha also told Feng Jiu that Su Mo Ye, Aranya's teacher, had returned. The two met and Feng Jiu found out that Mo Ye entered Aranya's Dream to find the truth behind Aranya's death, and Feng Jiu agreed to help him.

For Qing Hua's, Aranya's mother's, birthday, Xiang Li Que, the emperor, decided to go on a cruise to view camellias. On the ship, Feng Jiu met Aranya's sisters and her husband, Xi Ze, the former Archmage. Since it was his first time meeting Xi Ze, Mo Ye found a picture of him and realized that the Xi Ze he met is actually Dong Hua, but doesn't tell Feng Jiu, who did not recognize Dong Hua due to magic interference. Seeing him sad and lovelorn over Aranya, Feng Jiu thought to take him to see the Yue Ling flowers to cheer him up, but ending up going with Dong Hua instead.

The next day, Feng Jiu was punished for leaving Chang Di, Aranya's younger sister, with Prince Qing. Chang Di replaced her cell with the Jiu Qu cage, and Feng Jiu was tortured for days. Then, a celestial fire broke out and Chen Ye saved her life. When Feng Jiu returned to her courtyard, she found Xi Ze carefully tending to the pregnant Ju Nuo, Aranya's older half-sister, and felt sorry for Aranya.

Feng Jiu met up with Mo Ye and told him what happened to her. Feng Jiu ended up crying herself to sleep and Dong Hua, who had been listening behind a tree, took her back to her room and told Mo Ye not to tell Feng Jiu.

Later at a banquet, Feng Jiu found out that Chang Di wanted to marry Xi Ze, but Dong Hua started to care more about Feng Jiu, causing her to wonder if he's been hexed. Jealous, Chang Di and Ju Nuo plotted to have everyone think that Feng Jiu was committing adultery with Mo Ye, but Dong Hua intervened.

Part Four: The Shadowed Soul

Both princesses were punished and when they returned to the capital, it was found that Ju Nuo's child is the result of an affair, so she was sentenced to death while Chang Di angered their father and was banished. Mo Ye requested Feng Jiu to repeat Aranya's life by saving Ju Nuo. In the original timeline, Chen Ye came out of seclusion and pleaded for Ju Nuo, his fiancée, and Aranya appeased her father's fury. In the end, Ju Nuo was banished and Chen Ye was under house arrest at Aranya's manor.

One night, while watching the stars, Feng Jiu ended up going to the Shui Yue Swamp, the barrier between the Dream World and the Real World. There, she found Dong Hua fighting with a water serpent and learned from the spirits watching that they had been fighting nonstop for two days, because the serpent wanted to devour the girl sleeping at the bottom of the lake. In the end, Feng Jiu returned to her original body and Dong Hua was injured. When they met, Dong Hua kissed her and said that the serpent's poison caused him to do so.

Wondering how Feng Jiu ended up in Aranya's body instead of in Ju Nuo's womb, Dong Hua decided to create a Miao Hua Mirror to let him see the lives of immortals. Feng Jiu made some toffee candies and had Cha Cha send them to Dong Hua while also sending Aranya's first letter to Chen Ye. This caused Chen Ye to throw a tantrum, saying that Feng Jiu can't be Aranya. Later that night, Dong Hua came to take Feng Jiu out to the Maiden's Festival. As Feng Jiu was scared that Dong Hua would turn homosexual, they ended up running away from a mob of girls who wanted to go on a date with Dong Hua.

After a few days, Dong Hua switched places with Mo Ye, who had gone to help with the Miao Hua Mirror. Mo Ye told Feng Jiu about Wen Tian's regular visits to accompany Chen Ye to keep him from suspecting Aranya. Feng Jiu admired Aranya for being able to push the man she loved on to another woman. Mo Ye told her of the time the three went to visit Xi Ze and how Chen Ye saved Aranya. Two years later Xiang Li Que died, the new king died in battle, and Aranya hung herself while Ju Nuo became queen and forbid anyone from speaking Aranya's name.

Afterwards, Feng Jiu asked Mo Ye about serpent poisons that caused someone to kiss another, and Mo Ye said that there was no such thing. To avoid Dong Hua's anger, he made Feng Jiu realize that she was in love.

Before Ju Nuo left, Feng Jiu let her meet with Chen Ye just as Aranya had done. Later, she invited Chen Ye to tea to cheer him up, and he asked Feng Jiu why she was being nice to him when she was in love with Xi Ze. Feng Jiu said that they were only playing just as Cha Cha brought Dong Hua over.

It began to rain heavily later that night, and Dong Hua appeared in Feng Jiu's room, drenched. Feng Jiu got him to take a bath and he asked her when she started to fall for Chen Ye, admitting that he wanted to kill him, but didn't want to see her unhappy. Seeing him jealous, Feng Jiu was overjoyed and said that she liked him, not Chen Ye, resulting in them consummating their marriage.

A week passed and Feng Jiu let Dong Hua return to Qi Nan Palace to finish the Miao Hua Mirror. Chen Ye asked to meet with Feng Jiu and admitted that he created this world to revive Aranya. Then, he placed Aranya's soul into Feng Jiu's body. Feng Jiu fainted and saw Aranya's memories.

After Xiang Li Que died, Chen Ye returned to Qi Nan Palace and Aranya was arrested for killing her father. Qing Hua visited Aranya and told her that Chen Ye had requested she be executed at the shrine as well as to allow him to marry Wen Tian. Aranya asked her mother if she'd ever loved her and what she had done to cause Qing Hua to want her to die. Qing Hua said she'll repay her in their next life, but Aranya refused and sadly lamented on how much Chen Ye hated her to hand her this revenge. Later, Aranya was kidnapped by Xi Ze and asked him to take her half-brother, Xiang Li He, to a safe place so that he wouldn't be killed by Qing Hua. Aranya took Xiang Li He's place on the battlefield and, at the cost of incinerating her soul, performed the Soul Evocation Formation to defend her home.

On Dong Hua and Mo Ye's side, once the Miao Hua mirror was completed, they saw Chen Ye's past.

Chen Ye met Aranya when she was still in the snake pit, where she was thrown in by her mother after she was born. He told Aranya her name and fed her. Wishing to take Aranya out, Chen Ye left for training to become the next Archmage powerful enough to provide Aranya with a happy life. When he returned, Mo Ye was the one who took Aranya out of the snake pit. Later, Chen Ye attended a banquet in Heaven and Aranya got married, causing Chen Ye to distance himself further from her. After he became Archmage, Qing Hua forced an engagement between him and Ju Nuo, and Chen Ye avoided marriage by going into seclusion. He came out on Ju Nuo's execution day and realized that he no longer recognized the person Aranya had become. When he stayed at her manor, Chen Ye knew that Aranya was writing to him under someone else's name and was furious. However, he realized that he was in love with her when they went to visit Xi Ze. Later, Qing Hua came and asked him to help her crown Ju Nuo and Chen Ye agreed in exchange for Aranya's life. To avoid Qing Hua's suspicion, he requested a marriage with Wen Tian. Then, Chen Ye secretly went to see Xi Ze and asked him to take Aranya away to a safe place. Chen Ye passed his days in leisure until Xi Ze came to visit and told him of Aranya's death. Chen Ye was in denial and ran to the place Aranya died. He was prepared to die with her when Xi Ze appeared and said that there might be a way to resurrect Aranya. In anger and regret, Chen Ye caused Fan Yin Valley to fall into eternal winter to mourn Aranya's death. After that, he created Aranya's Dream.

The image in the Mirror than shifted to Heaven, 300 years ago, revealing the picture of comatose Dong Hua after suppressing the dark energy of the Miao Yi Hui Ming Realm (Hui Ming Realm). It is then revealed that Chen Ye was created from a part of Dong Hua's shadow to guard the Hui Ming Realm.

Before he could look into Aranya's past, Dong Hua appeared in front of Chen Ye and took Feng Jiu back. Upon seeing Dong Hua's renowned sword, Chen Yi recognized the former Master of the Universe and asked him to return Feng Jiu to him, but Dong Hua refused.

The Miao Hua mirror then revealed a picture of Feng Jiu meeting with the Lord of the Underworld, Xie Gu Chou, who told her of Chen Ye's existence. Feng Jiu asked him to create a soul out of half of her shadow, and send her to serve Chen Ye.

Finally knowing the truth that shadows can only live one life after which, turn to dust, Chen Ye lost the will to live and the Aranya's Dream started to collapse. Dong Hua sealed Chen Ye and Aranya's soul into two trees to allow them to be together. Next, he summoned the Elderly Fairy guarding the Stone of Destiny to inquire about his fate with Feng Jiu. The Elderly Fairy said that originally, the two did not have a fate, but because of Chen Ye and Aranya's failed fate, they were allowed to meet to continue this fate. However, he warned Dong Hua that because he had inquired today, tomorrow, destiny could change.

Part Five: Mistaking Destiny

They left Aranya's Dream and Dong Hua altered Feng Jiu's memories to preserve the fate they had together. Later, Chi Wu and Feng Jiu met up to say farewell to Xiang Li Meng, as the Bi Yi Niao now knows that they are not from the Owl Clan. Feng Jiu also revealed that the person Xiang Li Meng was in love with is actually her. Xiang Li Meng's image of Feng Jiu was destroyed and he ran out, saying that he'll never trust women again.

Ji Heng confronted Dong Hua the day they were returning to Heaven, begging him to take her along. However, Dong Hua refused, saying that by staying in the Valley, the poison in Ji Heng's body will stabilize itself and disappear after 3000 years.

Once returned, Feng Jiu went to see Bai Qian, and was reminded of her Bing Cang (concealment of weapon) ceremony, a ceremony proving her capabilities to protect her people. Feng Jiu panicked and dedicated her time to finishing her sword. Finally, the day of the Bing Cang Ceremony arrived and Feng Jiu displayed her sword's capability by passing through various trials. She was about to place the sword with the others when Nie Chu Yin, one of the Seven Lord of the Demon Clan, appeared and challenged her to a duel. As expected, Feng Jiu lost, but before Chu Yin could secure a favor from Qing Qiu, Han Shan Zhen Ren, a celestial under goddess Nuwa, said that Chu Yin still has to win against Feng Jiu's husband. When Dong Hua appeared on the platform, Chu Yin wanted to back out. In the end, Chu Yin lost and the ceremony was completed. After that, Dong Hua talked with Bai Zhi, Feng Jiu's grandfather, and their marriage ceremony was set. Later, Chi Wu appeared and asked Dong Hua to come with him to save Ji Heng, who had left Fan Yin Valley.

Dong Hua never returned for the wedding, and Feng Jiu later heard from Bai Zhi that he had eloped with Ji Heng. Feng Jiu waited for Dong Hua to come and explain himself to her, but he never did, and her health began to decline. Zhe Yan, the first phoenix of the universe, came to visit and told Feng Jiu that her memories were altered and that she is pregnant. Afterward composing herself, Feng Jiu went to the Underworld to revive Qing Ti, leaving him in Gu Chou's care while she went to the Human World.

200 years passed and from all of Bai Qian's previous letters, Feng Jiu learned that Dong Hua had come to look for her, but Bai Zhi turned him away. Dong Hua refused a divorce and searched the world for her. In her latest letter, Bai Qian said that Dong Hua now knows that Feng Jiu is in the mortal realm. After that, Feng Jiu received a letter informing her that Dong Hua will grant mortal ascension into divinity one last time before it's closed forever, causing Feng Jiu to return to Heaven to help with Qing Ti's ascension.

When she first descended to the Human Realm to repay her life-saving debt to Dong Hua, Feng Jiu was known as Consort Chen, a small concubine in the harem. Emperor Song, Dong Hua's mortal incarnation, bestowed her away to become Qing Ti's concubine. Feng Jiu did not hid her true identity and told Qing Ti many things. Qing Ti ended up dying to protect her from a demon's blade and Feng Jiu promised him that she will mourn for him for three lifetimes, but could not give him the love he asked for.

After meeting with Qing Ti, Feng Jiu met with Dong Hua. He briefly explained himself and said that Feng Jiu is the most important person to him before giving her a crystal ring, saying that she'll remain his wife until he dies. Feng Jiu said that it was too late, gave Dong Hua back the ring, and left. After she left, Dong Hua coughed up blood and told Zhong Lin, his housekeeper, to give the ring to Feng Jiu after he's gone.

Feng Jiu stayed in the Underworld, as not many people knew of Gun Gun's, her son, existence. Later, Qing Ti came to see her and told her that Dong Hua named him his successor, causing Feng Jiu to leave in panic. Gu Chou explained that the only time a powerful deity will name his successor is when that deity is about to die.

Feng Jiu came to Tai Chen Palace and Zhong Lin told her the truth of that year. It turned out that Ji Heng used her father's life-saving grace against Dong Hua, asking him to divorce Feng Jiu and never marry. Dong Hua refused and cured Ji Heng's poison by transferring it to himself and returned her to her position as Princess of the Red Demon Clan, thus ending the debt. Dong Hua sent two letters with Chi Wu to tell the others to postpone the wedding and explain everything to Feng Jiu, but Chi Wu met with an enemy on the way and ended up in a coma for several months. Once Dong Hua knew, he rushed to find Feng Jiu, but at that time, the Hui Ming Realm began to collapse. Zhong Lin told Feng Jiu that Dong Hua had never reincarnated as a mortal, but had been preparing to purify the Hui Ming Realm. However, now he has chosen to stabilize it at the cost of his life. Zhong Lin then gave her the ring and said that it was made from half of Dong Hua's heart.

Feng Jiu rushed to the Holy Blue Sea to find Dong Hua fighting with the demoness of the Hui Ming Realm, Miao Luo. Dong Hua had created a barrier to keep everyone out, but Feng Jiu managed to enter because of the ring. She ended up injured and laid dying in Dong Hua's arms. All hope of saving the two seemed lost until Bai Qian, Ye Hua, and Mo Yuan appeared, broke the barrier, and sealed off the dark energy of the Hui Ming Realm.

Back in the Underworld, Gun Gun woke and Gu Chou took him to Feng Jiu's room, causing father and son to finally meet.

== Characters ==
=== Main characters ===
Bái Fèng Jiǔ (白凤九): Born in September with a phoenix flower birthmark on her forehead, she was given the name Feng Jiu, which literally translates as 'Phoenix Nine'. The youngest ruler of one of Qing Qiu's territories, Feng Jiu is the only known red nine-tailed red fox in the world and is known as the second most beautiful girl after Bai Qian. She is Bai Qian's only niece, and was quite spoiled growing up. However, because she fell in love with Dong Hua, Feng Jiu experienced much bitterness. Feng Jiu has a childish personality that she only reveals to those close to her while maintaining her mature queen facade in front of others.

Dōng Huá Dì Jūn (东华帝君): Often addressed by others as Dì Jūn (lit. 'Emperor Lord'), a title held only by a few highly known and revered ancient deities in the Three Lives, Three Worlds universe, Dong Hua was the first emperor of the Heaven Clan, the man who united the world. It is said that Dong Hua is one of the few gods who has entered oneness, a state of single-mindedness; only being either good or evil. After passing his title off to the next Tian Jun, Dong Hua became known as the walking Buddhist encyclopedia and lived a leisure life, rarely minding himself with matters of the realms. Silently born from the Blue Sea of the Eastern Land as neither a god nor a demon, he was given the name 'Dong Hua', which literally translates as 'Brilliance in the East'. Dong Hua was adopted by Zhi He's family, but never received true familial love, and growing up in times of war caused him to become cold. Despite his quiet appearance, Dong Hua has a venomous tongue and is quite shameless with his morals and actions. He doesn't mind making little sacrifices to obtain his goals and has a lot of confidence in himself. Everyone thinks he was born from a rock.

Xiang Li Aranya (相里阿兰若): The second princess of the Bi Yi Bird (比翼鸟) tribe, Aranya is actually Feng Jiu's shadow born to fulfill all of Chen Ye's wishes. After her birth, Aranya's mother threw her into the snake pit due to hatred for her father. Chen Ye was the one who told Aranya of her name, feeding her until she was out of the pit. Aranya had been in love with Chen Ye ever since, and never once had she forgotten his kindness to her.

Chen Ye (沉晔): The Archmage of the Bi Yi Bird tribe, who is Dong Hua's shadow sent to guard the Hui Ming Realm. He fell in love with Aranya since the day he met her, but only realized it when he could no longer recognize her. He trained in order to save Aranya, wishing to raise her and allow her to fly to her birthright, but forgo this due Su Moye. The name 'Ye', which meant 'bright,' was given to him by Ju Nuo's father, Xing Liyin, because on the day he was born, a solar eclipse occurred. Known as the most powerful Archmage, Chen Ye practiced creation sorcery, a type of sorcery not known to many. He created Aranya's dream to resurrect her, but due to both being shadows, they had no chance of reincarnation.

Ji Heng (姬蘅): Princess of the Red Demon Clan who almost married Dong Hua due to her father's plead. Ji Heng calls Dong Hua 'teacher' and is a romantic. She was originally in love with her guard, Minsu, and eloped with him on her wedding day, causing her brother to disown her. However, she later found out that Minsu is a woman in disguise after Minsu died. Later, Ji Heng became obsessed with Dong Hua due to his kindness towards her and caused many misunderstandings between him and Feng Jiu.

Yan Chiwu (燕池悟): One of the Seven Lords of the Demon Clan, Chiwu is described to be as beautiful as a woman and upon first meeting, Gun Gun thought that he was a girl. Chiwu is in love with Ji Heng, but she does not like him because he is a brute. Chiwu challenged Dong Hua to fights regularly, but is often tricked by him into free labor instead. Due to their time together, Chiwu and Feng Jiu became friends and he often tells Feng Jiu false theories about Ji Heng and Dong Hua, leading both Feng Jiu and himself into believing that Dong Hua is in love with Ji Heng, and that Dong Hua's actions only serve to make Ji Heng jealous so that they could become an official couple.

Su Mo Ye: Aranya's teacher who rescued her from the snake pit, causing her fate with Chen Ye to go astray. He is the West Sea's second prince, a famous womanizer and friend of Lian Song. His mother is the Goddess Qi Shan, a white python who gained immortality and became the snake queen. Although he said he thought of Aranya as his daughter, he later became aware that he was in love with her after her death.

=== Supporting characters ===
Lian Song: Lian Song is the third son of the current Tian Jun of Heaven, Ye Hua's third uncle, and a great, and perhaps only, friend of Dong Hua. Born under the sea, Lian Song is known as the Water God of the Four Seas and Zhe He's teacher. In the novel, he helped Dong Hua keep the secret of erasing Feng Jiu's memories. Lian Song is known to be a festive playboy with a fun personality, having a habit of teasing people, and likes to gossip.

Miao Luo: She is a demon created from the dark energy seeping out of the Hui Ming Realm. Dong Hua often has to meet with her whenever he comes to purify the Hui Ming Real.

Qing Hua: Aranya, Ju Nuo, and Chang Di's mother, she threw Aranya into the snake pit out of hatred for Xiang Li Que, who killed her husband and used Ju Nuo to threaten her into becoming his queen. In order to get Ju Nuo to the throne, she discarded both Aranya and Chang Di, causing Ju Nuo to become afraid of her. In the end, she was locked up by Ju Nuo and went mad.

Xia Gu Chou: Lord of the Underworld in charge of human reincarnation, Gu Chou rarely interacts with other immortals or leave his realm. However, he managed to become friends with Feng Jiu, who often drinks and sends wine to him, and knew about her feelings and experience with Dong Hua. By Feng Jiu's request, he created Aranya.

Xiang Li Chang Di: Aranya's little sister, she is their father's beloved and grew up in the palace with Ju Nuo, causing her to become arrogant and willful. Despite being full blooded sisters, Chang Di doesn't like Aranya, even wants her dead, and is in love with Dong Hua in the Dream World. In the end, Chang Di was banished and went mad.

Xiang Li Ju Nuo: Aranya's older half-sister, the daughter of the previous king of the Bi Yi Niao, the current queen in real time, and Xiang Li Meng's mother. Her mother's favorite, Ju Nuo grew up with a gold spoon and was dearly protected despite her step-father's hatred. She became Chen Ye's fiancée and queen of the Bi Yi Niao through her mother's arrangement.

Xiang Li Que: He is Aranya and Chang Di's father. Xiang Li Que rebelled against his brother and took over the throne, because he was in love with Qing Hua, who at the time was his sister-in-law. He wanted to kill Ju Nuo, his brother's only child, but was poisoned to death by Qing Hua.

Ye Qing Ti: When he was a mortal, he was the oldest son of a marquis with roots in the military. Emperor Song, Dong Hua's mortal reincarnation, bestowed him a powerful marriage and gave him Consort Chen, Feng Jiu's human title, as a concubine. The first time they met, he fell in love with Feng Jiu at first sight, but kept a distant from her. He died protecting Feng Jiu, causing him to be inflected with demonic energy and could only be reincarnated as a demon. However, to repay him, Feng Jiu gave him an immortal body and allowed him to become a celestial.

=== Minor characters ===
Ah Li: He is Bai Qian and Ye Hua's son. Ah Li is 500 years old, yet still appears as a young child and often fights with his father for his mother's affection. Ah Li is very close to his cousin, Feng Jiu, and despite their age difference, Ah Li is forced to call Dong Hua 'brother'.

Bai Gun Gun: Feng Jiu and Dong Hua's son, Gun Gun has a toddler's appearance, but is very composed and responsible, finding himself caring for his childish mother as he grows up.

Bai Qian: Former Queen of Qing Qiu and current Crown Princess of the Heaven Clan, she is Ah Li's mother and Feng Jiu's aunt. Bai Qian loves watching Chinese opera and is renowned as the number one beauty of Heaven.

Bai Zhi: One of the old deities holding the title of Di Jun, Bai Zhi is the ruling emperor of Qing Qiu, Feng Jiu's grandfather. He is a nine-tailed white fox who is very laid back and forgetful. Despite his title as Di Jun, Bai Zhi displays some form of respect towards Dong Hua, as he was once a subordinate serving under Dong Hua in the Prehistoric Age.

Cang Yi: He is the deity of Mount Zhi Yue whom Feng Jiu almost married 70 years prior to the start of the novel. Cang Yi met Feng Jiu at Zhe Yan's peach blossom forest, and fell in love with her at first sight. In order to marry her off, Bai Zhi had Feng Jiu tied and sent off to Mount Zhi Yue. Later that night, Feng Jiu destroyed the palace on Mount Zhi Yue and escaped.

Cha Cha: Aranya's personal maid who served Feng Jiu in the Dream.

Elder Yun Zhuang: One of the few people who knew of the Hui Ming Realm's existence, he helped to cover up Dong Hua's 100 years of sleep by having Si Ming rewrite the Mortal Book of Fate to make everyone believe that Dong Hua went to the Human Realm for experience. Through Zhong Lin's request, he created Chen Ye and erased their memories so that no one knew of Chen Ye's connection to Dong Hua.

Meng Hao: Ji Heng's father who once served under Dong Hua. He was locked up on Mount Bai Shui, where he first met Ji Heng and died saving her, asking Dong Hua to take care of her in his place. Having once saved Dong Hua's life, he was promised one favor from Dong Hua.

Mi Gu: Feng Jiu's housekeeper who previously served Bai Qian, Mi Gu holds the title of a Xian Jun and is a tree spirit.

Min Su: Ji Heng's guard who was banished to Mount Bai Shui by Xu Yang in order to separate him and Ji Heng. However, Min Su is actually a woman and the person she is in love with is Xu Yang.

Mo Yuan: Known as the revered God of War, he is the master of Kun Lun Mountain, Ye Hua's twin brother and Bai Qian's teacher.

Si Ming: Si Ming is the Chinese deity in charge of mankind's fate. Known as one of the two walking encyclopedia of Heaven, Si Ming loves to gossip. In the story, he was the only one who knew about Feng Jiu's time as Dong Hua's pet fox, and was also the only one who knew of her suffering during that time. Is it hinted within the story, as well as the drama, Eternal Love, that he is in love with her.

Tian Jun (Chinese: 天君; lit. 'Heaven Lord'): The current emperor of the Heavenly Clan, he is Lian Song's father and Ye Hua's grandfather. He is very humble towards Dong Hua.

Wen Tian: A female scholar at the Royal Academy, she had stayed at Aranya's residence for a time and, with Aranya and Xi Ze's help, got into the school. Aranya signed her name in her letters to Chen Ye and asked Wen Tian to come accompany Chen Ye so he wouldn't be bored. She later fell in love with him.

Ye Hua: The Crown Prince of the Heaven Clan, he is Mo Yuan's twin brother and Ah Li's father. When he was young, he called Dong Hua 'uncle'.

Xi Ze: The former Archmage of the Bi Yi Niao, he was married to Aranya in order for her father to be able to suppress the powers of the shrine. However, due to their age difference, the two were only closed friends. When Chen Ye was young, Xi Ze gave most of his task to him and when Xi Ze fell ill, he retreated to the mountains to heal. Dong Hua froze him in the mountains and took on his name in Aranya's Dream.

Xiang Li He: Aranya's half-brother and the crown prince who later become Qing Hua's puppet emperor. He is childish, powerless, and too kindhearted, so Aranya asked Xi Ze to protect him while she took his place on the battlefield.

Xiang Li Meng: He is the second prince of the Bi Yi Niao. When he was young, he wondered into Feng Jiu's wedding parade to Mount Zhi Yue, and she saved him from being caned. He was in love with her ever since, remaining unmarried and wishing to leave the Valley to meet her despite never having seen her true appearance. However, once he found that Feng Jiu was not as he'd imaged her to be, he lost faith in women.

Xu Yang: Ji Heng's adopted brother and the ruler of the Red Demon Clan. He wanted Ji Heng to marry Dong Hua to strength his powers. Xu Yang is sworn brothers with Yan Chi Wu.

Zhe Yan: As the world's first phoenix, Zhe Yan is one of the deities holding the title of Di Jun and, just like the rest, rarely involves himself with matters of the eight realms, choosing to guard his peach orchid. However, he has a close relationship with the Bai family and a special relationship with Bai Zhen, Feng Jiu's fourth uncle. Zhe Yan often makes plum wine and is a renowned doctor. Although he respects and does not want to be enemies with Dong Hua, Zhe Yan did not tell anyone about Feng Jiu's pregnancy and sent many safe abortion medicines to her.

Zhi He: Dong Hua's foster sister, she is arrogant and likes to show-off. Grew up in Tai Chen Palace, Zhi He is a water deity under Lian Song, and her duty was to call upon rain. She is also in love with Dong Hua, who only took care of her out of obligation to her parents. Zhi He often bullied Feng Jiu when she was a maid at Tai Chen Palace, never allowing her to meet Dong Hua in fear and jealousy of her beauty. When Feng Jiu was a fox, Zhi He also bullied her out of jealousy. Zhi He did not agree with Ji Heng marrying Dong Hua, and the day Feng Jiu left, she became the bride, causing her to be punished to the mortal realm.

Zhong Lin: He is Tai Chen Palace's housekeeper. Despite his young age, Zhong Lin continued to serve Dong Hua is because he knew Dong Hua's heart best.

== Television adaptation ==
Starring Dilraba Dilmurat and Vengo Gao, the drama adaptation of this novel released in January 2020. The script was written by Lian Zhen Hua and Tang Qi Gong Zi, and is a production of Tencent Pictures. The director is Chu Yu Bin and the drama is set for 56 episodes running for about 45 minutes each.
