= Eternal Love of Dream =

2020 Chinese television series

- Poster for Eternal Love of Dream
- Also known as: Three Lives Three Worlds, The Pillow Book

Chinese name
- Traditional Chinese: 三生三世枕上書
- Simplified Chinese: 三生三世枕上书
Transcriptions
Standard Mandarin
- Hanyu Pinyin: Sān Shēng Sānshì Zhěn Shàngshū
- Genre: Xianxia; Fantasy; Romance
- Based on: Three Lives Three Worlds, The Pillow Book by Tangqi Gongzi
- Written by: Liang Zhenhua
- Directed by: Yang Xuan
- Starring: Dilraba Dilmurat; Vengo Gao
- Opening theme: "Person By The Bedside" by Tiger Hu
- Ending theme: "Deliberately" by Dilraba Dilmurat & Silence Wang
- Composer: Tan Xuan
- Country of origin: China
- Original language: Mandarin
- No. of episodes: 56

Production
- Executive producers: Gao Shen; Zhao Jie
- Production location: Hengdian World Studios
- Running time: 40-45 minutes
- Production companies: Tencent Penguin Pictures, Jiaxing Media

Original release
- Network: Tencent Video
- Release: January 22 – March 5, 2020

Related
- Eternal Love; Love and Destiny

Eternal Love of Dream (Chinese: 三生三世枕上书; pinyin: Sān Shēng Sānshì Zhěn Shàngshū), also known as Three Lives Three Worlds, The Pillow Book, directed by Yang Hsuan, is a 2020 Chinese Xianxia television series starring Dilraba Dilmurat and Vengo Gao It is based on the novel Three Lives Three Worlds, The Pillow Book by Tangqi Gongzi, and is the sequel to the 2017 drama Eternal Love. It tells the entangled love story of Donghua and Bei Fengjiu lasting for 3 lives. Being rescued by Dong Hua when she was little, Bei Fengjiu is prompted to return this favor. Her admiration and gratitude gradually turns into love. The series started airing on Tencent Video on January 22, 2020, and concluded its run of 56 episodes on March 5, 2020.

== Synopsis ==
When she was little, nine-tailed red fox Bai Fengjiu got lost in Demon Realm, where she was attacked by a savage beast and rescued by Dong Hua, the former emperor of the Heaven Clan. This makes her determined to repay this life debt. She enters Taichen Palace, where Dong Hua lives, as a maid to find an opportunity to repay him. To save him from the Ten-Lotus ward, she is turned into an ordinary one-tailed fox, which Dong Hua, unaware that the fox is one of his maids, then brings back to his palace and raises as a pet. Hearing that Dong Hua is about to marry Ji Heng – princess of the Demon Clan, Fengjiu leaves Taichen Palace. Dong Hua then searches for her but fails to find her.

Fengjiu is finally able to repay her life debt to Dong Hua by helping him in his mortal trial, but in the process, the mortal Yi Qingti dies protecting her.

Dong Hua and Fengjiu encounter each other several times both in Fengjiu's home of Qing Qiu and in heaven. While Dong Hua quickly takes interest in her, she keeps avoiding him. Dong Hua brings a handkerchief, knowing that it is Fengjiu in disguise, to a battle against Yan Chiwu, where a cyclone appears and sweeps both Chiwu and Fengjiu into Fanyin Valley. 6 months later, Fengjiu registers for a competition, where the prize is a pimpon fruit (a magical fruit capable of reviving mortal bodies), to revive Ye Qingti, whom Fengjiu feel indebted to as he died to save her. Dong Hua, who comes here as a teacher, trains Fengjiu to prepare for the competition. Upon winning, Fengjiu is soon disappointed because the prize has been switched to peaches and heartbroken to hear from Ji Heng that Dong Hua gladly gave her the fruit at her insistence. Determined to get it at all cost, Fengjiu comes to the snake's maze and ultimately enters Aranya's dream. She is then saved again by Dong Hua, and they both realize their feelings for each other.

On their wedding day, Dong Hua does not show up because Ji Heng emotionally blackmails him and compels him to stay single forever. He furiously transfers poison from her body to his own and prohibits her from ever leaving the Demon realm. A brokenhearted Fengjiu leaves and starts her new life in the mortal realm with her son Bai Gungun. At their last meeting before Dong Hua's final battle with Miao Luo, he gives her a ring made from half of his heart, which she refuses. When she finds out that Dong Hua is about to die in a battle, she decides to join it to help him; and they finally succeed in defeating Miao Luo. While treating Fengjiu, Dong Hua gets to meet his son Gungun.

== Cast ==
=== Main ===
- Dilraba Dilmurat as Bai Fengjiu
  - The youngest female monarch of Qing Qiu, and the only known nine-tailed red fox in the world. Bai Yi's daughter, Bai Qian's niece, Dong Hua Dijun's wife and Gungun's mother.
- Vengo Gao as Dong Hua Dijun;
  - The first heavenly emperor of the Heaven Clan; the man who united the world. Bai Fengjiu's husband and Gungun's father

=== Supporting ===
==== Qing Qiu ====
- Zhang Gong as Bai Zhi
  - King of the Fox tribe.
- Ma Rui as Fox Queen
  - Wife of Bai Zhi. Bai Qian, Bai Zhen, and Bai Yi's mother.
- Baron Chen as Zhe Yan
  - The first phoenix deity in the world. A well-known peach winemaker and a renowned doctor who resides in the peach blossoms forest.
- Leng Haiming as Bai Yi
  - Second son of the Fox King. Feng Jiu's father.
- Zhang Yufei as Feng Jiu's mother
- Huang Junjie as Bai Zhen
  - Fourth son of the Fox King.
- Yang Mi as Bai Qian
  - Youngest daughter of the Fox King. Former female monarch of the Qing Qiu kingdom and current Crown Princess of the Heaven Clan. A Li's mother.
- Zhang Mingcan as A Li
  - Bai Qian and Ye Hua's son/daughter.
- Kou Jinghao as Bai Gungun
  - Feng Jiu and Dong Hua's son.
- Zhao Ziqi as Mi Gu
  - A tree spirit. Housekeeper of Qing Qiu.
- Wang Yiming as Xiao Jingwei
  - Bai Zhen's mount, Feng Jiu's classmate.

==== Nine Heavens ====
- Jiang Kai as Heavenly Emperor
  - Current ruler of the Nine Heavens.
- Li Dongheng as Lian Song
  - Third prince of the Nine Heavens.
- Dylan Kuo as Su Moye
  - The second prince of the West Sea.
- Wang Xiao as Si Ming
  - A deity in charge of mankind's fate.
- Yuan Yuxuan as Cheng Yu
  - An immortal who is brought from the mortal realm to the Nine Heavens by the Heaven Lord.
- Wang Yifei as Zhi He
  - A water deity under Lian Song. Dong Hua's adopted sister (her parents helped raise Dong Hua).
- Hu Yunhao as Xie Guchou
  - Lord of the Underworld in charge of human reincarnation.
- Zhang Yunlong as Cang Yi
  - Deity of Mount Zhi Yue.
- Chong Ming as Meng Hao
  - An aquatic dragon deity who once served under Dong Hua. Ji Heng's father.
- Wang Minghui as Yun Zhuang
  - He helped cast Dong Hua's shadow into the Fan Yin valley and created one of the souls to be Shen Ye.
- Fan Zhixin as Chong Lin
  - Housekeeper of Tai Chen Palace.
- Chen Siche as Yu Ru
  - Zhi He's personal servant.
- Wang Mengjiao as Zhao Lu
  - Maid of Taichen Palace. Feng Jiu's friend.

==== Fan Yin Valley / A'LanRuo’s Dream ====
- Li Jinrong as Xiangli Que
  - Former King of Biyi Bird tribe. A'LanRuo and Chang Di's birth father. He rebelled against his brother and took over the throne because he was in love with Qing Hua, who at the time was his sister-in-law.
- Che Yongli as Qing Hua
  - Former Queen of the Biyi Bird tribe. A'LanRuo's mother.
- Li Bowen as Xiangli He
  - Crown prince of the Biyi Bird tribe.
- Fu Miao Sun Xuening as Xiangli Ju Nuo
  - First princess and current Queen of the Biyi Bird tribe. Xiangli Meng's mother. Shen Ye's fiancée.
- Ma Zhehan as Xiangli Chang Di
  - Third princess of the Biyi Bird tribe.
- Yi Daqian as Xiangli Meng
  - Second prince of the Biyi Bird tribe. Son of Xiangli Ju Nuo.
- Dilraba Dilmurat as Xiangli A'LanRuo
  - Second princess of the Biyi Bird tribe.
- Vengo Gao as Shen Ye
  - Archmage of the Biyi Bird tribe, A'LanRuo's cousin.
- Zhu Yongteng as Xi Ze
  - Former Archmage of the Biyi Bird tribe. A'LanRuo's husband (in name), and Shen Ye's teacher.
- Tian Xuanning as Wen Tian
  - A female scholar at the Royal Academy.
- Sabrina Zhuang as Jie Lu
  - Xiangli Meng's cousin.
- Ye Yunfei as Cha Cha
  - A'LanRuo's personal servant.

==== Demon Clan ====
- Zhang Wen as Miao Luo
  - Ruler of the Demon Clan. She was created from the dark energy seeping out of the Hui Ming Realm.
- Jin Zehao as Xu Yang
  - Ruler of the Red Demon Clan. Ji Heng's adopted brother. He is sworn brothers with Yan Chi Wu.
- Liu Yuxin as Ji Heng
  - Princess of the Red Demon Clan, Dong Hua's disciple.
- Liu Ruilin as Yan Chiwu
  - Ruler of the Green Demon Clan, younger twin brother of Zi Lan.
- Dai Xiangyu as Nie Chuyin
  - One of the Seven Lord of the Demon Clan.
- Wang Ruoshan as Min Su
  - Ji Heng's personal servant and bodyguard.
- Wang Kui as Xuan Yue
  - Yan Chiwu's subordinate.

==== Mortal realm ====
- Vengo Gao as Song Xuanren
  - Emperor of Cheng Yu kingdom. Dong Hua's mortal identity.
- Dilraba Dilmurat as Madam/Lady Jiu
  - Consort of Song Xuanren Feng Jiu's mortal identity.
- Xu Shaoying as Ye Qingti
  - A general. Oldest son of Ye Zhen. Marquis with a military background.
- Liu Yuxin as Chu Wan
  - Song Xuanren's consort. Adopted Princess of Chong'an Kingdom. Ji Heng's mortal identity after she fell off a cliff and lost her memory.
- Wang Ruoshan as Ling Xiang
  - Chu Wan's personal servant.
- Hu Kun as Song Xueying
- Yang Mingna as Consort Xian

== Production ==
On January 24, 2018, it was announced Vengo Gao and Dilraba Dilmurat would be reprising their roles as Dong Hua and Bai Fengjiu from Eternal Love, respectively. Eternal Love of Dream is Vengo Gao and Dilraba Dilmurat's seventh collaboration, after Swords of Legends, V Love, Legend of Ban Shu, The Ladder of Love, Eternal Love, and Mr. Pride vs Miss Prejudice.

The series began filming on June 10, 2018 at Hengdian World Studios, and wrapped 162 days later on November 19, 2018.

== Reception ==
Eternal Love of Dream surpassed more than 190 million views on its first day of release, and over 1 billion views in just one week on Chinese Tencent Video platforms. As of April 2021, the series has exceeded 8 billion views on the online platform. The series also gained a firm footing internationally, scoring a first in the online view rankings for Thailand, and exceeding a million clicks for its first few episodes in Vietnam. The series has a 6.7 and 7.9 rating on Douban and China Tencent Video, respectively.

Eternal Love of Dream won "Best Web Series of the Year" at the 2020 Tencent Video All Star Awards, while Vengo Gao won "Quality Series Actor of the Year" and Dilraba Dilmurat won "Most Popular Series Actor of the Year". For his role as Dong Hua, Vengo Gao also won "Best Actor in a Period Drama" at the 29th Huading Awards.

== Soundtrack ==
No.	Title	Lyrics	Music	Singer	Length
1.	"Person By The Bedside (枕边人)" (Opening theme song)	Liu Chang	Tan Xuan	Tiger Hu	4:29
2.	"Deliberately (偏偏)" (Ending theme song)	Luan Jie	Tan Xuan	Dilraba Dilmurat & Silence Wang	4:00
3.	"Book of Fate (缘字书)"	Duan Sisi	Tan Xuan	Su Shiding	4:01
4.	"Heart Desire at Peace (心欲止水)"	Liu Chang	Tan Yulong	Zhang Bichen	4:31
