= The Flame's Daughter =

2018 Chinese television series

- Drama poster
- Also known as: Fire of Eternal Love
- Genre: Wuxia; Romance
- Based on: Lie Huo Ru Ge by Ming Xiaoxi
- Written by: Mobao Feibao
- Directed by: Liang Shengquan
- Starring: Dilraba Dilmurat; Vic Chou; Vin Zhang; Liu Ruilin
- Country of origin: China
- Original language: Mandarin
- No. of episodes: 52

Production
- Executive producer: Gao Shen
- Production locations: Xiangshan Movie & Television Town
- Running time: ≈45 minutes per episode
- Production companies: Jay Walk Studio; SMG Pictures; Perfect World Pictures; Mandala Media

Original release
- Network: Youku
- Release: March 1 – April 5, 2018

The Flame's Daughter (烈火如歌) is a 2018 Chinese wuxia romance television series based on the novel of the same name by Ming Xiaoxi. It stars Dilraba Dilmurat, Vic Chou, Vin Zhang and Liu Ruilin in leading roles. The series premiered on Youku on March 1, 2018.

== Synopsis ==
In ancient times, Anhe Palace was in a position of placing the country into jeopardy. The owner of the palace, An Ye Luo, was in love with his senior An Ye Ming, but An Ye Ming married a wandering warrior named Zhan Feitian and birthed a daughter with him. In order to protect her daughter from An Ye Luo's grasp, Lie Mingjing, Zhan Feitian's sworn brother, swapped his son Zhan Feng with her.

After Zhan Feitian's death, Lie Mingjing named the girl Lie Ruge and took custody of Zhan Feitian's son, Zhan Feng. Lie Ruge grew up with her seniors, Zhan Feng and Yu Zihan. Lie Ruge and Zhan Feng both fell in love but An Ye Luo, seeing Liehuo Pavilion growing in strength and power, tricked Zhan Feng into believing that Lie Mingjing killed his father. This resulted in Zhan Feng breaking up with Lie Ruge, who eventually became acquainted with Yin Xue, somebody who grew to protect her.

Over time, An Ye Luo managed to coerce Zhan Feng into killing his biological father, Lie Mingjing. When Zhan Feng hesitated to do so, Lie Mingjing's adoptive son killed Lie Mingjing (who did so to please An Ye Luo). Eventually, Zhan Feng learned the truth about his birth and decided to get revenge on An Ye Luo. Together with Lie Ruge, Yu Zihan, and Yin Xue, they were able to defeat An Ye Luo and restore peace to the nation.

== Cast ==
=== Main ===
Actor	Character	Introduction
Dilraba Dilmurat	Lie Ruge	Heiress of Liehuo Pavilion. Though she is not strongly skilled in martial arts and is lacking in worldly experiences, her kind and bright personality makes her loved by everyone. She becomes "reborn" after undergoing various tribulations, and was able to remove the curse that was placed on her since she was a child that prevented her martial arts from improving.
Vic Chou	Yin Xue	An otherworldly expert who is inscrutable and mysterious, and possesses highly skilled martial arts. He will do anything in order to keep Ruge safe and happy, even at the cost of his own health.
Vin Zhang	Zhan Feng	Eldest disciple of Liehuo Pavilion. Adopted son of Zhan Feitian, biological son of Lie Mingjing. A resolute and reticent man who is also gentle. He has a lifetime pact with his childhood lover and friend, Lie Ruge; but it was ruined after he was misled by An Ye Luo. He then turns into a vengeful, cold and cruel man.
Liu Ruilin	Yu Zihan / Prince Jingyuan	Seventh prince. He was harmed as a child due to the inner political maneuvers within the palace; and lost both his hearing and ability to walk. In order to get away from the palace trifles, he retreats to Liehuo Pavilion where he becomes the second disciple. Calm, intuitive and as gentle as jade, he is Lie Ruge's loyal companion and protects her from dangers.

=== Supporting ===
==== Liehuo Pavilion and associates ====
Actor	Character	Introduction
Xiao Rongsheng	Lie Mingjing	Chief of Liehuo Pavilion. Lie Ruge's adoptive father, and Zhan Feng's biological father. He is proud of Zhan Feng and believes in him no matter what.
Chen Yelin	Ji Jinglei	Third disciple of Liehuo Pavilion. He is loyal to Zhan Feng, but his loyalty doesn't cloud his sense of right and wrong. He also has a crush on Xunyi.
Fan Yining	Yi Lang	Chief of Zhihuo Hall. He is cold and awkward and is known for being Lie Mingjing's most trusted confidant, but ends up betraying him out of greed.
Jin Po Han	Yingyi	A former courtesan who was brought to Liehuo Pavilion by Zhan Feng. She pretends to be weak in front of Zhan Feng, but actually knows martial arts. She is at odds with Lie Ruge. She is also the one who put the idea of betraying Lie Mingjing into Zhan Feng's head. She commits suicide by drowning.
Li Dongheng	Zhongli Wulei	Chief of Qinglong Hall who is in love with Die Yi.
Chen Kai	Murong Yizhao	Chief of Jinhuo Hall who is close with Lie Ruge. He is known to have spoilt her in her youth, therefore he gets criticized whenever he defends her. Ruge regards him as an uncle.
Chen Yue		Chief of Ling Hall who is often at odds with Murong.
Yuan Yuxuan	Die Yi	Lie Ruge's personal attendant who is in love with Zhongli Wulei. She is killed by Yi Lang.
Fang Xieyue	Madame Huang	A kind woman from Ping'an who initially helps Ruge and Yin Xue, believing that they are a couple who ran away to elope.

==== Anhe Palace ====
Actor	Character	Introduction
Lai Yi	An Ye Luo	Owner of the Anhe Palace, a highly skilled and powerful man. He is persistent and sincere toward loving An Ye Ming, but not getting his feelings reciprocated turns him into a cold and vengeful man who is hell-bent on making everyone suffer along with him.
Gong Beibi	An Ye Jue / Yan Niang	Third disciple of Anhe Palace. She disguises herself as the second mistress of Pili Sect. A treacherous and capricious woman who only listens to her senior brother, An Ye Luo.
Dilraba Dilmurat	An Ye Ming	First disciple of Anhe Palace. Lie Ruge's birth mother who An Ye Luo was in love with.

==== Wu Dao City ====
Actor	Character	Introduction
Qi Hang	Dao Wuxia	Eldest young master of Wu Dao City who is greedy and clever man. A huge womanizer.
Gao Yang	Dao Wuhen	Second young master of Wu Dao City.
Dai Si	Dao Liexiang	Young mistress of Wu Dao City. She is kind at heart and stands up for justice and ends up falling in love with Lei Jinghong. However, she is torn between her love for Lei Jinghong and loyalty to her brothers.

==== Pili Sect ====
Actor	Character	Introduction
Chen Xuming	Lei Hentian	Chief of Pili Sect.
Zhang He	Lei Jinghong	Young master of Pili Sect. A brash and reckless man who is unafraid of anything and is known for his childish behavior. He's persistent when it comes to Dao Liexiang and their relationship.
Ma Deya	Xunyi	Head attendant of Liehuo Pavilion. Her real identity is the young mistress of Pili Sect, Lei Jinghong's long-lost half-sister, daughter of An Ye Jue.

==== Pin Hua brothel ====
Actor	Character	Introduction
Ge Shimin	Bi'er	A maid at Pin Hua brothel. Her actual identity is the former third chief of Qing Long Hall and is Lie Mingjing's confidante. Before Lie Mingjing's death, she was assigned to guard Ji Jinglei.
He Suo	Youqin Hong	Yin Xue's disciple. A skilled Qin player.
Wan Meixi	Mother Hua	Manager of Pin Hua brothel who respects Yin Xue, after he took her in when she had nowhere to go.
Wu Peirou	Feng Xixi	A courtesan. She was served by Lie Ruge during her stay at Pin Hua brothel, but killed off.
Long Zhengxuan	Feng Huang	A courtesan who later went on to accompany Lei Jinghong. Initially, she helps him out of pity but comes to develop feelings for him.
Luo Siwei	Xiang'er	Feng Huang's personal attendant. She was later brought by Dao Wuxia to Wu Dao City and becomes his personal attendant.

==== People at the palace ====
Actor	Character	Introduction
Shao Feng	Emperor	
Li Guangxu	Prince Jingyang	Second prince who vies for the throne.
Wang Renjun	Prince Jingxian	Third prince who also constantly vies for the throne. Prone to using underhanded tactics.
Fang Gongmin	Prime Minister Liu	Prince Jingyang's helper.
Yan Jingjie	Xuan Huang	Yu Zihan's personal bodyguard.
Sun Xiaolun	Huang Zong	Yu Zihan's personal bodyguard.
Qiu Bo	Chi Zhang	Yu Zihan's personal attendant. A skilled healer.

==== Others ====
Actor	Character	Introduction
Wang Lu	Zhan Feitian	A wandering warrior who was sworn brothers with Lie Mingjing. Lie Ruge's birth father.
Wang Gang	Xie Houyou	Chief of Duanlei Pavilion.
Wu Tong	Cao Renqiu	Xie Houyou's disciple and son-in-law.
Shiyue Anxi	Xie Xiaofeng	Cao Renqiu's son.
Xu Min	Grandmaster Piaomiao	Yin Xue's teacher.
Zhou Qi		Yin Xue's senior brother.

== Production ==
The series is produced by the same team behind the 2017 hit drama Eternal Love, which consists of Gao Shen as its producer, Zhang Shuping as style director and Chen Haozhong as artistic director. Director Liang Shengquan is known for his works in Swords of Legends and The Mystic Nine; while screenwriter Mobao Feibao is known for her success adaptations of popular IPs like Scarlet Heart and My Sunshine. Costume designer Ru Meiqi and makeup director Su Yongzhi; who worked on Nirvana in Fire and All Quiet in Peking also joined the team.

Filming began on 30 March 2017 at Xiangshan Movie & Television Town, and wrapped up on 26 July 2017.

== Soundtrack ==
No.	Title	Lyrics	Music	Singers	Length
1.	"Ru Ge (如歌)" (Opening Theme song)	Dan Sisi	Tan Xuan	Jason Zhang
2.	"Yu Huo Cheng Shi (浴火成诗)" (Ending Theme song)	Dan Sisi	Tan Xuan	Dilraba Dilmurat & Mao Buyi
3.	"Listening Snow (听雪)"	Liu Yang	Tan Xuan	Zhang Bichen
4.	"Late Maple (晚楓歌)" (Song of Rhapsody)	Liu Yang	Lu Hu	Meng Zikun
5.	"Incredulous Laugh (一笑荒唐)"	Wu Meidan	Wu Jianming	Liu Ruilin

== Awards and nominations ==
Award	Category	Nominated work	Result	Ref.
24th Huading Awards	Best Actor (Ancient Drama)	Vic Chou	Nominated	
Influence of Recreational Responsibilities Awards	Web Drama of the Year		Won	
