= Gao Weiguang =

Chinese actor

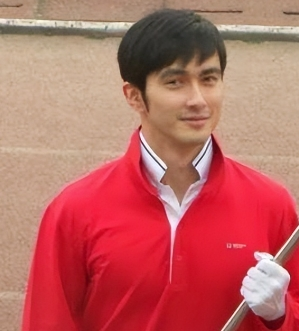
- Gao in 2017
- Born: January 16, 1983 (age 43); Mishan, Heilongjiang, China
- Other name: Vengo Gao
- Education: Central Academy of Drama
- Occupations: Actor; model
- Years active: 2006–present
- Agent: Jay Walk Studio (2014–present)
- Height: 191 cm (6 ft 3 in)

Gao Weiguang (Chinese: 高伟光, born 16 January 1983) is a Chinese actor and model. He is known for his roles in hit dramas Eternal Love, Candle in the Tomb: The Wrath of Time, Eternal Love of Dream, Legend of Fuyao, and Snowfall.

== Early life ==
Gao was born on January 16, 1983, in Mishan, Jixi city of Heilongjiang province, China. In 2006, he came in contact with the modelling industry while working alone in Chengdu. In the same year he participated in the New Silk Road Model look contest and emerged as the first runner-up.

In 2008, he took admission in the performance department of Central Academy of Drama, ranking at 8th place.

After his graduation, he joined Jay Walk Studio in 2013 through Yang Mi.

== Career ==
=== 2006–2013: Modeling career ===
Gao debuted as a model after winning 2nd place in New Silk Road Model Look competition in 2006. He continued his career as a successful international supermodel till 2013.

=== 2014–2016: Acting debut ===
Gao joined Jay Walk Studio and made his acting debut as the male lead in 2014 web series, V Love. The same year, he starred in the fantasy drama, Swords of Legends. From 2015 to 2016, Gao gained increased recognition from playing supporting roles in military drama Destined to Love You, Legend of Ban Shu, The Ladder of Love, etc. He played second male lead in 2016 workplace series The Interpreter. In the same year, he starred in suspense crime action film Heartfall Arises.

=== 2017–2018: Rising popularity ===
In 2017, Gao starred in fantasy romance drama Eternal Love, gaining popularity for his role as "Dong Hua". He won Media Recommended Actor of the Year award in China TV Drama Awards for his performance. He also starred in Xuan-Yuan Sword: Han Cloud, a fantasy action drama. In the same year he had his first big screen leading role in romantic comedy film Mr. Pride vs Miss Prejudice.

In 2018, he starred in popular fantasy drama Legend of Fuyao.

=== 2019–present: Breakthrough ===
In 2019, Gao starred in the third installment of Candle in the Tomb series, The Wrath of Time as one of the three main leads. He received the Best Actor (Period Drama) Award at the 26th Huading Awards for his performance.

In 2020, Gao starred as the male lead in fantasy romance drama Eternal Love of Dream, reprising his role as "Dong Hua" from Eternal Love. This role caused further increase in his popularity. He received the Best Actor (Period Drama) Award and Top Ten Most Popular Actor Award at 29th Huading Awards for his performance. He also starred in the fourth installment of Candle in the Tomb series, The Lost Caverns, reprising his popular role as "Partridge Whistle" or "Zhe Gu Shao". In the same year he starred as the main lead in popular dramas Miss S and Living Toward The Sun.

In 2021, he starred in popular dramas Dreams and Glory and Sword Snow Stride.

In 2022, Gao portrayed the role of Captain Qin Guan, the male lead in military-action drama "Operation Special Warfare".

In 2023, Gao starred as the male lead in modern workplace drama The Outsider. He portrayed the role of CEO Wang Ju An.

In 2024, he starred in Above the Rivers as the male lead, judge Luo Yuan. He also starred in "The Legend of Heroes" and portrayed the role of Ouyang Feng, one of the five great masters of martial art. In the same year, he played the main lead, Shen Zhi Heng, the famous vampire and owner of a newspaper company in popular drama "Snowfall".

In 2025, Gao portrayed the role of warrior Yan Shao (other name Chu Tian Yao) in fantasy, time travel drama Love and Sword. In the same year, he also starred as the male lead, Prosecutor Bai Enyu, in popular courtroom drama "Endless Protection". He also starred in The Company (Ya She 哑舍), a fantasy drama involving time travel in 2025.Gao Weiguang portrayed the role of Bizhi, an antiques dealer from the future who can travel back into the past to retrieve antiques.

== Filmography ==
=== Film ===
Year	English title	Chinese title	Role	Ref.
2014	The Embalmer	化妆师	Gao Jun	
2016	Heartfall Arises	惊天破	Jiang Jun	
2017	Mr. Pride vs Miss Prejudice	傲娇与偏见	Xiao Jianjun	
2022	Today and Me	无负今日	Huang Shaocheng	
TBA	The Sand Murmurs	沙海之门	Lao Hu	

=== Television series ===
Year	English title	Chinese title	Role	Network	Notes/Ref.
2014	Swords of Legends	古剑奇谭	Yin Qianshang / Feng Guangmo	Hunan TV	
2014	V Love	微时代之恋	Ying Dong / Kaiser	Tencent Video	
2015	Destined to Love You	偏偏喜欢你	Du Feng	Hunan TV	
2015	Legend of Zu Mountain	蜀山战纪之剑侠传奇	Dan Chenzi	iQiyi	
2015	Legend of Ban Shu	班淑传奇	Prince Zuoxian	Tencent Video	
2016	The Ladder of Love	爱的阶梯	Chu Yaohui	Tencent Video	
2016	The Classic of Mountains and Seas	山海经之赤影传说	Bin Yi	Hunan TV	
2016	The Interpreter	亲爱的翻译官	Gao Jiaming	Hunan TV	
2017	Eternal Love	三生三世十里桃花	Dong Hua	Dragon TV, Zhejiang TV	
2017	Xuan-Yuan Sword Legend: Han Cloud	轩辕剑之汉之云	Purple-clothed reverent	Dragon TV	
2018	Legend of Fuyao	扶摇	Zhan Beiye	Zhejiang TV	
2019	Candle in the Tomb: The Wrath of Time	鬼吹灯之怒晴湘西	Zhe Gushao	Tencent Video	
2020	Eternal Love of Dream	三生三世枕上书	Dong Hua	Tencent Video	
2020	Candle in the Tomb: The Lost Caverns	鬼吹灯之龙岭迷窟	Zhe Gushao	Tencent Video	Guest appearance
2020	Miss S	旗袍美探	Luo Qiuheng	Beijing TV, Tencent Video, HBO Go	
2020	Living Toward The Sun	向阳而生	Lin Zhiheng	Hunan TV, Mango TV	
2021	Glory and Dreams	光荣与梦想	General Yang Jingyu	Beijing TV, Dragon TV, Tencent Video, iQiyi, Youku	Guest appearance
2022	Operation: Special Warfare	蓝色闪电	Qin Guan	Tencent Video, CCTV-8	
2022	Sword Snow Stride	雪中悍刀行	Chen Zhibao	Tencent Video, CCTV-8	Guest Appearance
2022	Defying the Storm	凭栏一片风云起	Fu Hengzhen	Hunan TV, Tencent Video, Mango TV	Guest Appearance
2023	The Outsider	无入浮华	Wang Ju'an	Youku	
2024	Snowfall	如月	Shen Zhiheng	Tencent Video	
2024	Above the Rivers	江河之上	Luo Yuan	Tencent Video, CCTV-1, iQiyi	
2024	The Legend of Heroes: Hot Blooded	金庸武侠世界	Ouyang Feng	Tencent Video	
2025	Love and Sword	只此江湖梦	Chu Tianyao	Tencent Video	
2025	Endless Protection	无尽的尽头	Bai Enyu	Tencent Video	
2025	The Prisoner of Beauty	折腰	Wei Bao / Bo Gong	Tencent Video	
2025	The Legend of Heroes: Duel on Mount Hua	新金庸武侠世界：华山论剑	Ouyang Feng	Tencent Video	
2025	The Company	哑舍	Bizhi	Tencent Video	
2026	About Love	玫瑰丛生	Gong Yuanqian/Lao Gong	Tencent Video	
2026	Blossoms of Power	百花杀		Tencent Video	
TBA	Blooming	芳名三九	Liang Zhicheng	Tencent Video	
TBA	Remnants of Gold	金色	Ban Cha	Tencent Video	
TBA	Mad Blackfin	疯狂的黑鱼	Chen Binbin	Tencent Video	

== Brand promotion ==
Gao Weiguang has been a brand ambassador of luxury brands including Cartier, and Movado.

== Modeling career achievements ==
Gao was one of the top ten male models in China from 2009 to 2012. In 2017, Gao attended the Milan Fashion Week in Italy.

Year	Award	Result	Ref.
2006	New Silk Road Model Contest 1st Runner-up	Won	
2006	Sina Network Popularity Award	Won	
2006	Mr. Perfect Award	Won	
2009	Five Best Chinese Professional Model Awards (male group)	Won	
2010	Five Best Chinese Professional Model Awards (male group)	Won	
2011	Five Best Chinese Professional Model Awards	Won	
2012	Top Ten Professional Fashion Model of The 15th China International Fashion Week	Won	

== Awards and nominations ==
Year	Award	Category	Nominated work	Result	Ref.
2017	22nd Huading Awards	Best New Performer	The Interpreter	Nominated	
2017	China TV Drama Awards	Media Recommended Actor Of The Year	Eternal Love	Won	
2017	ITOP iFensi Event	Breakthrough Actor of the Year	—N/a	Won	
2017	24th Fashion COSMO Beauty Ceremony	Most Beautiful Idol of the Year	—N/a	Won	
2017	14th Esquire Man At His Best Awards	Crossover Artist of the Year	—N/a	Won	
2018	18th Chinese Campus Art Glory Festival	Most Popular Role Model Artist	—N/a	Won	
2018	2018 FEIA Annual Awards Ceremony	Popular Actor of The Year	—N/a	Won	
2018	China TV Drama Quality Ceremomy	Rising Star of the Year	Eternal love, Xuan-Yuan Sword:Han Cloud	Won	
2019	YOKA Fashion Ceremony	Stylish Actor Of The Year	—N/a	Won	
2019	26th Huading Awards	Best Actor (Period Drama)	Candle in the Tomb: The Wrath of Time	Won	
2019	26th Huading Awards	Best Supporting Actor	Candle in the Tomb: The Wrath of Time	Nominated	
2019	Golden Bud - The Fourth Network Film and Television Festival	Best Actor	Candle in the Tomb: The Wrath of Time	Nominated	
2019	Tencent Video All Star Awards	Breakthrough Actor	Candle in the Tomb: The Wrath of Time	Won	
2020	Tencent Video All Star Awards	Quality TV Actor of the Year	Eternal Love of Dream	Won	
2020	7th The Actors of China Award	Best Actor (Web Series)	—N/a	Nominated	
2020	7th The Actors of China Award	Outstanding Actor	Eternal Love of Dream	Won	
2020	29th Huading Awards	Best Actor (Period Drama)	Eternal Love of Dream	Won	
2020	29th Huading Awards	Top Ten Favourite Actor	Eternal Love of Dream	Won	
2020	29th Huading Awards	Best Supporting Actor	Candle In The Tomb: The Lost Caverns	Nominated	
2020	Tencent Entertainment White Paper Awards	TV series Actor of the Year	—N/a	Won	
2021	2nd Global Film and Television Culture Communication Forum	Influential Artiste	Eternal Love of Dream	Won	
2021	Wonderland Heaven On Earth Gala	Most Stylish and Competent Actor Of The Year	—N/a	Won	
2022	Golden Blossom Awards	Popular Artist of the Year	—N/a	Nominated	
2024	China TV Drama Quality Ceremony	Pioneering Star of the Year	The Outsider	Won	
2025	Annual Chinese TV Drama Ceremony	Best Appealing Actor in a Television Series	Above The Rivers	Nominated	
2025	Annual Chinese TV Drama Ceremony	Best Audience Favourite Actor of The Year	Above the Rivers	Won	
2025	Weibo Vision Conference	Most Promising Actor of the Year	Endless Protection	style="background: #9EFF9E; color: #000; vertical-align: middle; text-align: center; " class="yes table-yes2 notheme"|Won	
