= Love and Destiny =

Chinese web series

- Also known as: 宸汐缘
- Genre: Xianxia; Romance
- Based on: Three Lives, Three Worlds: Eternal Destiny of Chen Xi (三生三世宸汐缘) by Ye Qi Lan Che (夜启澜辰)
- Written by: Zhao Na; Chen Liwen; Jiang Yuehua
- Directed by: Lin Yufen; Liang Shengquan; Ren Haitao; Guo Hu
- Starring: Chang Chen; Ni Ni
- Opening theme: "It's Fate" by Aska Yang
- Ending theme: "Forgoing Worries" by Jane Zhang
- Composer: Tan Xuan
- Country of origin: China
- Original language: Mandarin
- No. of episodes: 60

Production
- Executive producer: Liu Zhi
- Producer: Zhao Yifang
- Running time: 45 mins
- Production companies: Huace Media; Croton Media iQiyi; Gcoo Entertainment

Original release
- Network: Hubei Television; Shenzhen Satellite TV iQiyi
- Release: July 5, 2019

Love and Destiny (Chinese: 宸汐缘; pinyin: Chen Xi Yuan) is a 2019 Chinese television series starring Chang Chen and Ni Ni. The series premiered on iQiyi on July 15, 2019. It later went on national broadcast and aired on Hubei Television and Shenzhen Satellite TV on January 26, 2020.

Although sharing the same theme as Three Lives, Three Worlds, Love and Destiny is adapted from the novel Three Lives, Three Worlds: Eternal Destiny of Chen Xi by Ye Qi Lan Che (夜启澜辰) and is unrelated to Eternal Love and Eternal Love of Dream, the two series adapted from novels by Tang Qi Gong Zi (唐七公子). The series received a nomination for Best Telenovela at the 48th International Emmy Awards.

== Synopsis ==
This is a love story between God of War Jiu Chen, and a young fairy maiden named Ling Xi. Ling Xi accidentally awakens Jiu Chen who had been sleeping for fifty thousand years after he sealed the demon lord away.and the love begins between them

== Cast ==
=== Main ===
Actor	Character	Introduction
Chang Chen	Jiu Chen	A first-class high immortal who holds the position of the God of War. He wields the Kun Wu sword. He has been asleep for 50,000 years, and was awakened by Ling Xi.
Ni Ni	Ling Xi	The last descendant of the Dan bird tribe. Daughter of Ling Yue and Mo Huan. She was adopted by Le Bo, and hidden away in the Peach Blossoms forest to prevent the Demon tribe from discovering her due to her demonic energy. Her true form is a Phoenix, waiting to be awakened.
Ni Ni	Lin Mo	Ling Xi's identity in the mortal realm during her trial. She was adopted by Lin Shaohai as his wife could not bear a child. Born deaf and mute, she is meek in nature as she was often bullied. However, she is kind at heart. She is skilled in medicine.

=== Heaven tribe ===
Actor	Character	Introduction
Li Jiaming	Yun Feng	High immortal of the Military Department, who resides at Fei Lian Hall. Last disciple of the Heavenly Supreme Lord and Jiu Chen's junior. He was hated by Qing Yao in the beginning because he failed to save Qing Yao's husband, but later become lovers with Qing Yao. He appears unbridled and derelict, but is loyal and humorous.
Hai Ling	Yuan Tong	One of the Four Great Generals of the Heaven Tribe. Yuan Zheng's younger sister. She has an unrequited love for Jiu Chen. Because of her obsessiveness and jealousy, she committed many bad deeds was ultimately banished from the Nine Heavens.
Zhang Haiyu	Si Ming	Lord of Dipper of South, who is in charge of life and fate of the human realm. He resides at Si Ming palace. He is close friends with Shi San, but feels awkward around her due to her crush on him.
Na Guangzi	Shi San	A merfolk who was born genderless, and used to be a male general under Jiu Chen. When Shi San is 500 years old, he chose to become a female immortal because she likes Si Ming. She has a heavy weapon called the "Kun Jin Dang". She is straightforward and loud, and is kind at heart.
Hei Zi	Tianlei Zhenjun	God of Heavenly Thunder. He resides at Tianlei Palace. He is known for his intolerance toward evil. He aspires to be the next God of War, and treats Jiu Chen like a rival.
Lu Jiani	Yu Li	Daughter of the Medicine King. She admires Jiu Chen.
Gao Xuyang	Du Yu	Water Immortal Lord of the Eastern Seas. He is in love with Yuan Tong, and tries his best to guide her to the right path.
Xu Jian	Yuan Zheng	Former subordinate of Jiu Chen. One of the Four Great Generals of the Heaven Tribe. Yuan Tong's elder brother. He was possessed by the demons during the Heaven-Demon war and requested Jiu Chen to kill him, in order not to affect his family's reputation.
Huang Haibing	Heavenly Emperor	Ruler of the Heavens.
Li Dong	Baishan Immortal	Heavenly Emperor's aide.
Chenpeng Wanli	Qin Yuan	Disciple of Nanji Xianweng. Zhong Hao's god-son. He later left South Pole Continent to work for Zhong Hao to repay his debt. He likes Bao Qing, and saved her from being killed by Zhong Hao.
Xie Yuan	Nanji Xianweng	A deity residing in the South Pole Continent. Qin Yuan's teacher. He guards the Shui Yue Vessel.
Wang Xinting	Hua Yan	A maid in Fu Yun Hall. She is actually Jing Xiu's mole in the Nine Heavens.
Wang Qingxiang	Heavenly Supreme Lord	Jiu Chen and Yun Feng's teacher. He resides at Heaven Mountain.
Fu Jun	Jin Hua Immortal Lord	A high immortal who guards the rules and regulations of the Nine Heavens. He is good friends with Tianlei Zhenjun.
Shen Baoping	Immortal Peng	A high immortal who has held the positions of Water and Earth Deity. He helps Jiu Chen create an identity in the mortal world.
Xu Wenhao	Kai Yang	Jiu Chen's subordinate. One of the Four Great Generals of the Heaven Tribe. He likes Yu Li.
Xu Wenhao	Han Zhang	Jiu Chen's subordinate. One of the Four Great Generals of the Heaven Tribe.
Shen Dianhong	Zi Guang	Tianlei Zhenjun's subordinate.
Zhao Yijie	Fang Sheng	Tianlei Zhenjun's subordinate.
Zhang Yan	Medicine King	Yu Li's father. Old Madame Yuan's brother.
Zhang Ruijia	Old Madame Yuan	Yuan Zhen and Yuan Tong's mother.
Li Weifeng	Sangnan Xingjun	A high immortal residing at Bo Xiang Palace. His real form is a magical wood piece of Sangyu tree at Daluo Heavens in the East.
Han Zhenhua	Congjiyuan Xianweng	An immortal that guards the Congji continent, Jiu Chen's training grounds.
Wang Ding	Queen Mother of the West	Ruler of Kunlun Mountain.
Xu Jian	Wo Dou	A former mount of Zhu Rong (God of Fire) that guards the Demon Tower.
	Chang You	A demon in the Demon Tower, who is always hanging around Wo Dou.
Wang Haonan	Zhu Xie	Jiu Chen's former subordinate. One of the Four Great Generals of the Heaven Tribe.
Dou Dou	Nian'er	Jiu Chen and Ling Xi's daughter.
Wei Zhihao	Little Medicine Child	A little boy that works at the medicine hall.
Liu Shijie	Little Medicine Child	A little boy that works at the medicine hall.

=== Peach Blossoms Forest ===
Actor	Character	Introduction
Zhang Zhixi	Qing Yao	Descendant of the Fox tribe; her real form is a nine-tailed white fox. A medical officer at the Heavenly Palace's Medicine King Cave. Disciple of Le Bo and Ling Xi's senior. She is calm and mature. She used to harbor a grudge against Yun Feng due to her husband's death, but later falls in love with him.
Li Yu	Le Bo	Owner of the Peach Blossoms Forest. A former medical officer. Ling Xi's foster father; Qing Yao and Cheng Yan's teacher. He is skilled in harvesting spirit cores. He was killed by Yuan Tong while escaping with Ling Xi from the heavenly guards.
Yuan Hao	Cheng Yan	Descendant of the Fox tribe; his real form is a red fox. Qing Yao's younger brother, Ling Xi's childhood friend.
Yu Zixuan	Hua Meng	A flower spirit who was brought to the Peach Blossoms Forest by Cheng Yan. Her real form is a bamboo leaf.
Cui Peng	Mo Huan	Descendant of the Dan bird tribe. Ling Xi's father and Ling Yue's husband. Le Bo's junior. He was killed by Yuan Du.

=== Shan Ling Tribe ===
Actor	Character	Introduction
Li Dongxue	Jing Xiu	Descendant of the Swallow tribe. Royal advisor of Shan Ling tribe. A dark, calculating and complex man. When he was a child, he was forced to malign his father for colluding with the Demon tribe by Yuan Du, causing his whole tribe to be annihilated. He is seemingly loyal to his master Ling Yue, but has his own agenda. He falls in love with Lin Mo after she showered him with kindness while he was injured.
Liu Qianhan	Ling Yue	Ruler of Shan Ling tribe. Descendant of the Phoenix tribe. Ling Xi's mother and Mo Huan's wife.
Liu Yinglun	Bao Qing	Princess of Shan Ling Tribe. Ling Yue's adopted daughter. A vicious and arrogant woman. She likes Jing Xiu.
Ma Jun	Yuan Du	Previous Ruler of Shan Ling tribe. Ling Yue's father. He forced Jing Xiu to betray his family members so he could wipe out the entire swallow tribe. He also killed Mo Huan to prevent him and Ling Yue from being together, as the rulers of Shan Ling tribe are not allowed to marry outsiders. He was trapped in the Fuling Continent by Ling Yue.
Hou Peijie	You Chang	Father of Jing Xiu. He was falsely accused of colluding with the Demon tribe by Yuan Du, and killed by him.
Du Yiheng	Chi Bi	General of Shan Ling Tribe. Jing Xiu's subordinate and aide.
Du Heqian	Granny Shi	Ling Yue's confidante.
Ji Xiaofei	Chang Ting	A deity who inherits the position of the Ruler of Shan Ling tribe.
Yang Hongwu	Wu	A witch doctor of Shan Ling Tribe. Jing Xiu's advisor.
Wang Ting	Xiao Fu	Ling Xi's personal attendant.
Han Xue	A Yu	Bao Qing's personal attendant.
Feng Yuzhu	Lan'er	A maid that badmouthed Bao Qing and was gotten rid of the next day.

=== Demon tribe ===
Actor	Character	Introduction
	Wu Zhiqi	Fourth generation of Demon King.
Xue Haowen	Zhong Hao	Son of Lie Yi, Jiu Chen's former general that was banished from Nine Heavens to Shan Ling. He sold his soul to the demon lord after being pursued by Jing Xiu, and wants to avenge his tribe that was killed by Jing Xiu.
Wen Zhao	Hei Chi	Descendant of the Han Shan tribe. He appears to assist Zhong Hao, but is actually Jing Xiu's subordinate.

=== Mortal realm ===
Actor	Character	Introduction
Hou Changrong	Lin Shaohai	Lin Mo's father. He took Lin Mo from child's bureau when she was a baby and loves her as if she is his own child.
Tang Qun	Old Madame Lin	Lin Shaohai's mother and Lin Mo's grandmother.
Lin Jing	Pei Yun (Madame Yang)	Lin Shaohao's wife and Lin Mo's mother.
Yang Kaidi	Second Madame (Shu Hai)	Lin Shaohao's second wife. She dislikes Lin Mo.
Gao Yufei	Lin Zhan	Lin Shaohai's second daughter. Lin Mo's younger sister. She dislikes Lin Mo and always picks on her.
Ren Luomin	Physician Sun	A physician that takes in Lin Mo as his disciple.
Chen Ying	Madame Guan	A lady helper that works with Physician Sun. She is close with Lin Mo.
Cui Hang	Shen Peishu	A teacher that is match-made with Lin Mo.
Sui Yongliang	Zhu Zizai	A cultivating mortal. He saved Jiu Chen in the mortal world and was taken in as his first disciple.
Xu Lingchen	Bao Suozhu	A cultivating mortal. Zhu Zihai's disciple. He becomes Hua Yan's master after she was reincarnated.
Guo Jun	Physician Song	Friend of Lin Shaohai. He likes Ling Xi and wanted her to marry his son.
Li Meijun	Xiao Ju	Maid of Lin family.
Zhang Yixin	Madame Yu	Housekeeper of Lin family.
Li Weifeng	Fang Jun	One of Sangnan Xingjun's reincarnation during his mortal trial. Qing Yao's husband in the mortal realm.
Sun Xingqing	Madame Fang	Fang Jun's wife.

== Production ==
The series is produced by the team behind the 2017 drama Eternal Love, who stated that Love and Destiny is set in the same fictional world as Eternal Love and would be seen as a spin-off.

The series was filmed in Hengdian World Studios and Gansu from July to December 2018. Chang Chen and Ni Ni were announced as the leading actors on April 9, 2019 and a trailer was released the same day. The series marks Chang Chen's small screen debut. The rest of the supporting cast were unveiled on May 9, 2019.

== Reception ==
The series received positive reviews for its plot and acting, rising from an initial douban score of 5.4 to 8.3. It received praise for spreading the beauty of Chinese culture and promoting positive values.

== Soundtrack ==
No.	Title	Lyrics	Music	Singer	Length
1.	"It's Fate (是缘)" (Opening theme song)	Duan Sisi	Tan Xuan	Aska Yang
2.	"Water From the Heaven (水从天上来)"	Liu Chang	Tan Xuan	Zhang Bichen & Zheng Yunlong
3.	"The Fool on the Clouds (云上的傻瓜)"	Duan Sisi	Tan Xuan	Lu Hu (version 1), Li Jiaming (version 2)
4.	"Forgoing Worries (解忧)" (Ending theme song)	Liu Chang	Tan Xuan	Jane Zhang
5.	"Forest of Birds (鸟语林)"	Liu Chang	Dan Yulong	Shuangsheng

== Awards and nominations ==
Award	Category	Nominated work	Result	Ref.
The Third Internet Film Festival	Most Anticipated Director	Guo Hu	Won	
26th Huading Awards	Best Actor (Historical drama)	Chang Chen	Nominated	
26th Huading Awards	Best Actress (Historical drama)	Ni Ni	Nominated	
China Entertainment Industry Summit (Golden Pufferfish Awards)	Best Drama	Love and Destiny	Won	
Golden Bud - The Fourth Network Film And Television Festival	Best Web Series	Love and Destiny	Nominated	
Golden Bud - The Fourth Network Film And Television Festival	Top Ten Web Series	Love and Destiny	Won	
Golden Bud - The Fourth Network Film And Television Festival	Best Actor	Chang Chen	Nominated	
Golden Bud - The Fourth Network Film And Television Festival	Best Actress	Ni Ni	Nominated	
Sina Film & TV Award Ceremony	Top Ten Television Series	Love and Destiny	Won	
Film and TV Role Model 2019 Ranking	Most Popular Supporting Actress	Zhang Zhixi	Won	
48th International Emmy Awards	Best Telenovela	Love and Destiny	Nominated	
