= Mr. Pride vs Miss Prejudice =

- Poster
- Chinese: 傲娇与偏见
- Directed by: Li Haishu; Huang Yanwei
- Starring: Dilraba Dilmurat; Leon Zhang; Gao Weiguang
- Production companies: Alibaba Pictures Group Limited; Jaywalk Studio
- Distributed by: Alibaba Pictures Group Limited
- Release date: 20 April 2017
- Running time: 108 minutes
- Country: China
- Language: Mandarin
- Box office: CN¥105.9 million

Mr. Pride vs Miss Prejudice (Chinese: 傲娇与偏见) is a 2017 Chinese romantic comedy film directed by Li Haishu and Huang Yanwei and starring Dilraba Dilmurat, Leon Zhang and Gao Weiguang. It was released in China on 20 April 2017.

== Plot ==
Zhu Hou, a spoiled rich boy, conducts a grand scheme in order to ask out his crush Mo Mo. A mix-up occurs and the ceremony is instead performed on Tang Nan Nan, a struggling online writer. The ceremony goes awry and results in Zhu Hou being hospitalized and Tang Nan Nan's face swelling up due to a pollen allergy. At the hospital, Tang Nan Nan demands money from Zhu Hou as restitution. A scuffle ensues and results in Zhu Hou's wallet accidentally being thrown into a dumpster. Mo Mo arrives and explains that any future romantic relationship between them is unlikely. She pays Tang Nan Nan and leaves Zhu Hou, who is subsequently kicked out from the hospital after failing to pay his hospital bill.

Because of a condition, Zhu Hou is unable to remember the code to his house and resorts to living on the streets. After some time, Zhu Hou meets Tang Nan Nan and begs her to take him in. Out of pity, she agrees. Though they are annoyed at each other's differing behaviors and beliefs, a connection between the two forms. After a drunken night results in them blowing all their money, Tang Nan Nan is evicted due to her failure to pay rent. The two return to Zhu Hou's house where Tang Nan Nan breaks the lock on the door, allowing Zhu Hou to return home. There, he reunites with his friend Xiao Jian Jun, who immediately takes a liking towards Tang Nan Nan. Tang Nan Nan is visibly hurt at Zhu Hou's insistence that he had been living horribly and leaves. During a date between Xiao Jian Jun and Tang Nan Nan, Zhu Hou intercedes and carries Tang Nan Nan away. They get into an accident with Tang Nan Nan's ex Jiang Hai, whose wife Fang Qiqi invites Tang Nan Nan to dinner in an attempt to humiliate her. Tang Nan Nan arrives with both Xiao Jian Jun and Zhu Hou, whose feud is temporarily halted while they defend Tang Nan Nan from Fang Qiqi's insults. The dinner ends with Zhu Hou protecting Tang Nan Nan from Fang Qiqi. While Xiao Jian Jun fetches the car, Zhu Hou drags Tang Nan Nan away so they could hitch a ride on a bus. There, she thanks him for helping her move on from Jiang Hai, and they finally admit their feelings for each other. They move in together and begin dating.

Tang Nan Nan is suddenly offered a chance to travel the world for a year in order to write a travelogue. The news of her grandmother going blind inspires her to bring her grandmother along. Knowing that Zhu Hou has been developing an app in order to start a company of his own, Tang Nan Nan breaks up with him so he would not have to sacrifice his dreams for hers. A year passes and Zhu Hou is now the head of a successful company. While in Milan for a conference, he decides to head to Verona, remembering a play Tang Nan Nan wrote based on Romeo and Juliet. There, he realizes that Tang Nan Nan is also in Verona. He manages to capture her attention and asks her if she has forgotten him. With her grandmother's encouragement, Tang Nan Nan assures him that she has not and they reunite, kissing each other on the balcony of Juliet's House.

== Cast ==
- Dilraba Dilmurat as Tang Nan Nan
- Leon Zhang as Zhu Hou
- Gao Weiguang as Xiao Jian Jun
- Gina Jin as Mo Mo
- Ma Weiwei as Editor Ma
- Fan Tiantian as Da Tian Tian
- Mike D. Angelo as Jiang Hai
- Kathy Chow as Zhu Hou's Mother
- Edison

== Reception ==
The film has grossed CN¥105.9 million in China.

== Original soundtrack ==
Type	Title	Singer(s)
Opening Theme	《傲娇与偏见》	Dilraba Dilmurat, Leon Zhang
Ending Theme	《Amazing》	Chen Zi Tong
