= Dilraba Dilmurat =

Chinese actress, singer and model (born 1992)

- دىلرەبا دىلمۇرات 迪丽热巴·迪力木拉提
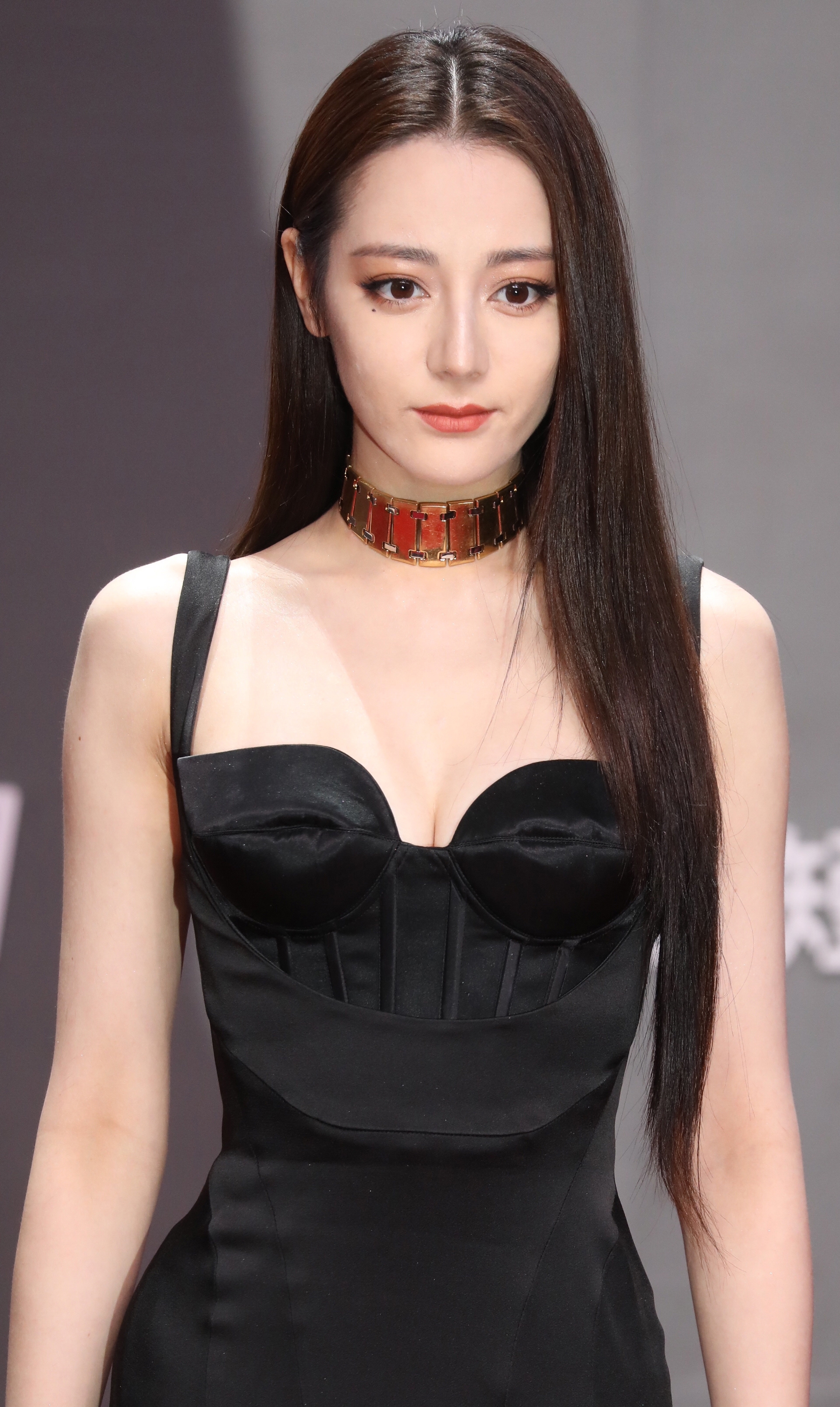
- Dilraba in August 2020
- Born: June 3, 1992 (age 34); Ürümqi, Xinjiang, China
- Education: Shanghai Theatre Academy; Northeast Normal University; Xinjiang Arts Institute
- Occupations: Actress; singer; model
- Years active: 2013–present
- Agents: Jay Walk Studio; Dilireba Studio

Uyghur name
- Uyghur: دىلرەبا دىلمۇرات
Transcriptions
- Latin Yëziqi: Dilreba Dilmurat
- Yengi Yeziⱪ: Dilrəba Dilmurat

Chinese name
- Simplified Chinese: 迪丽热巴·迪力木拉提
- Traditional Chinese: 迪麗熱巴·迪力木拉提
Transcriptions
Standard Mandarin
- Hanyu Pinyin: Dílìrèbā Dílìmùlātí

Dilraba Dilmurat (Uyghur: دىلرەبا دىلمۇرات; Chinese: 迪丽热巴·迪力木拉提; born June 3, 1992) is a Chinese actress, singer, and model. She is an ethnic Uyghur from Ürümqi, Xinjiang.

== Early life and education ==
Dilraba was born on June 3, 1992, in Urumqi, Xinjiang, China. In 2001, when she was nine years old, her father brought her to Xinjiang Art Middle School to take the entrance exam. At the time, she thought it was an interesting class. Later, when she got an offer from the school, she realized she would be going to a dance school for the next six years.

In 2007, she graduated from the Xinjiang Arts Institute and became a member of the Xinjiang Song and Dance Troupe. In 2009, she studied at Northeast Normal University in Jilin for one year. During this time, she received third place at a local singing contest. In 2010, she enrolled in the performance department of Shanghai Theater Academy, majoring in drama, film and television. In the same year, she auditioned for director Lu Chuan's new project The Last Supper.

== Career ==
=== 2013–2016: Acting debut and rising popularity ===
In 2013, Dilraba made her acting debut in the television drama Anarhan, playing the lead role. The drama was nominated for Outstanding Television Series at the 30th Flying Apsaras Awards. In 2014, she signed with Jay Walk Studio and starred in the web series V Love, produced by the company. The same year, Dilraba gained recognition for her role as Fuqu in the hit fantasy drama Swords of Legends.

In 2015, Dilraba starred in the romantic comedy Diamond Lover, winning acclaim for her role as a sassy pop-star. She won the Audience's Favorite Newcomer award at the 7th China TV Drama Awards for her performance. In 2016, Dilraba was cast in the leading role for the youth sports drama Hot Girl. She won the Outstanding New Actress award at 2016 ENAwards for her performance in the series.

=== 2017–present: Breakthrough ===
In 2017, Dilraba played the leading role in the romantic comedy Pretty Li Huizhen, a remake of South Korean drama She Was Pretty. The series was popular during its run, accumulating over 7 billion views online, and she won Most Popular Actress award and Audience's Choice for Actress award at the China TV Golden Eagle Award for her performance. She also starred in the fantasy romance series Eternal Love as a fox fairy. The drama gained explosive popularity in China as well as internationally, and led to increased recognition and popularity for Dilraba. For the role, she received a Best Supporting Actress nomination at the Shanghai Television Festival.

That same year, she had her first big screen leading role in romantic comedy film Mr. Pride vs Miss Prejudice. Her performance earned her the Best New Actress award at the 2016 China Britain Film Festival. She then starred in the historical romance drama The King's Woman, and fantasy film Namiya, the Chinese adaptation of Japanese novel Miracles of the Namiya General Store. Dilraba won the Newcomer award at the Golden Phoenix Awards for her performance in Namiya. In 2017, Dilraba also joined the fifth season of Keep Running as a cast member, earning increased popularity for her variety stint. Forbes China listed Dilraba on their 30 Under 30 Asia 2017 list which consisted of 30 influential people under 30 years old who have had a substantial effect in their fields.

In 2018, Dilraba starred in the romantic comedy film 21 Karat. She then starred in the wuxia romance drama The Flame's Daughter alongside Vic Chou. In the same year, the science fiction romance comedy drama Sweet Dreams alongside Deng Lun was premiered. The series' concurrent TV viewership ratings 'broke 1%', with an average of 1.018% in 52 cities and had reached 6 billion online views before the drama wrapped its run. Due to her rising popularity, Dilraba was crowned the Golden Eagle Goddess at the 12th China Golden Eagle TV Art Festival. In 2018, after surpassing 40 million followers on Weibo it was announced that Dilraba has an independent studio under Jay Walk Studio. In 2019, Dilraba appeared on the CCTV New Year's Gala for the first time, performing the song item "China Happy Events". Dilraba also joined the fifth season of Go Fighting! as a regular cast member. In 2019, she was one of the mentors in the competition show Produce Camp 2019.

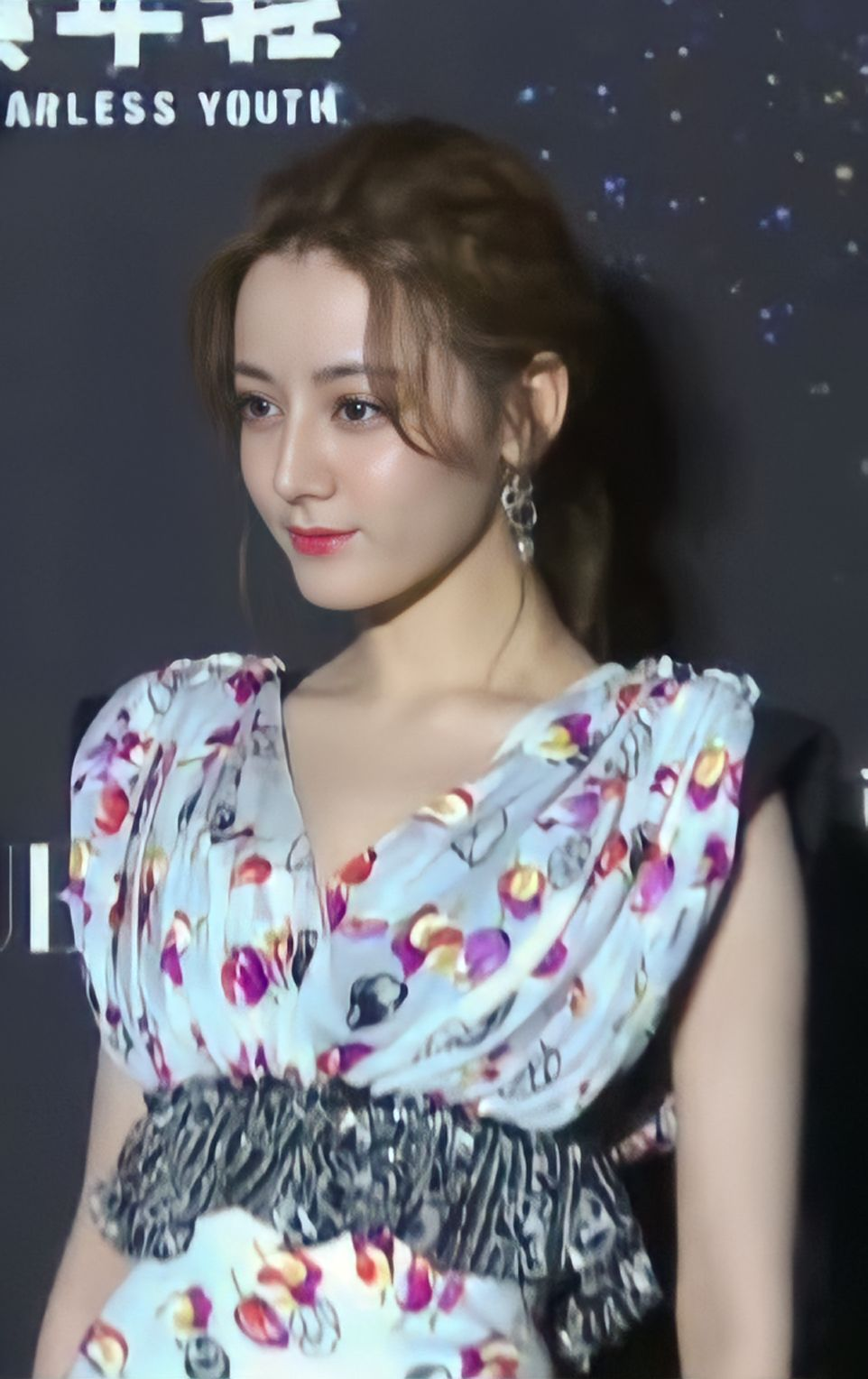
Dilraba in 2021

In January 2020, Dilraba starred in the fantasy romance Eternal Love of Dream, reprising her role as Fengjiu from Eternal Love. The same year, she starred in the workplace romance drama Love Advanced Customization, portraying a fashion designer. In June 2020, Dilraba was ranked by Statista as the second-most-popular celebrity on Douyin, with 55.6 million followers. Dilraba later starred in the historical fantasy film Saga of Light portraying Chang'e.

In 2021, she starred in the historical drama The Long Ballad, portraying Li Changge. This series brought her a further rise in popularity. Dilraba later starred in You Are My Glory as Qiao Jingjing alongside Yang Yang. The series was a commercial success and gained 4 billion views throughout its run. In 2022, she was cast in The Blue Whisper alongside Ren Jialun and in the Legend of Anle alongside Gong Jun. In 2023, she starred in the law drama Prosecution Elites alongside Tong Dawei. In 2025, Dilraba first starred as Deng Yan in the crime drama Sword Rose. Later that year, she portrayed Nie Jiu Luo in supernatural drama Love on the Turquoise Land, alongside Cheng Xingxu. In 2026, she took on the role of He Simu in fantasy drama Love Beyond the Grave, starring opposite Chen Feiyu.

== Other works ==
=== Endorsements ===
Dilraba is considered one of the most in-demand brand ambassadors in China due to numerous endorsement deals ranging from food and beverage, basic commodities, beauty and retail products, to mobile applications and technological products. She also endorses several international brands like L'Oréal and Mikimoto. P&G's Whisper saw a rise in sales after engaging Dilraba as their spokesperson. In 2018, Dilraba ended her contract with Dolce & Gabbana after a racist ad incident in China.

In 2021, as a Uyghur from Xinjiang, Dilraba publicly voiced her support for cotton produced in Xinjiang after several international companies announced they will not purchase cotton from the region due to concerns of forced labor of Uyghurs. Her actions were echoed by most other Chinese celebrities cutting ties with those brands.

In the same year, Dilraba was announced as Panerai's first ever female global brand spokesperson.

Dilraba is often regarded as a red carpet darling and global fashion icon. In 2023, Business of Fashion inducted her into its BoF 500 class of 2023, recognising her growing influence in the luxury fashion world. Following her appearance at the Dior Spring Summer Ready-to-wear show in Paris, French Vogue published an article documenting the sensation she caused amongst fans, international media and onlookers.

Since her debut, Dilraba has had more than 60 endorsements. As of June 2026, Dilraba has 22 active brand endorsements, serving as global brand ambassador for 16.

Year	Brand	Title	Ref.
2016	Whisper	Brand Spokesperson	
2017	Anmuxi Yogurt	Brand Spokesperson	
2018	Dolce & Gabbana	Brand Ambassador Asia Pacific	
2019	Swisse	Brand Spokesperson	
2020	Comfort Fabric Softener	Brand Spokesperson	
2020	Lux	Brand Spokesperson in Greater China	
2020	Kuaishou Video app	Brand Spokesperson	
2020	NACA Photo	Brand Spokesperson	
2021	Panerai	Global Brand Spokesperson	
2021	Guanzhu Tiles	Brand Spokesperson	
2021	Mikimoto	Global Brand Ambassador	
2021	Hennesy X.O	Brand Ambassador	
2021	Colorkey	Global Brand Spokesperson	
2021	One Leaf Face Masks	Brand Spokesperson	
2022	Dessmann Smart Locks	Brand Spokesperson	
2022	Clarins	Global Brand Spokesperson	
2022	Valentino	Asia-Pacific Fragrance Spokesperson	
2022	Kronenbourg 1664	Global Brand Spokesperson	
2022	Molsion Eyewear	Brand Spokesperson	
2023	Dior	Brand Ambassador	
2023	Dior Fragrance & Beauty	Global Brand Ambassador	
2023	Dior	Global Brand Ambassador	
2023	Aegan	Brand Spokesperson	
2024	Red Star Macalline	Brand Ambassador	
2024	Roye Hair Care	Global Brand Spokesperson	
2024	Lenovo and Motorola	Brand Ambassador	
2024	Half Acre Flower Field	Global Ambassador for Body & Lotion Hand Cream	
2025	Guanzhu Tiles	Global Brand Spokesperson	
2025	BOP Skincare	Global Brand Ambassador	
2025	Liby	Brand Ambassador	
2025	Camel	Global Brand Ambassador	
2025	Smartwater	Global Brand Spokesperson	
2026	Fakeme Eyewear	Global Brand Ambassador	
2026	Lucky Cup	Global Brand Ambassador	
2026	Kazoo	Global Brand Ambassador	
2026	Deeyeo	Global Brand Ambassador	
2026	Land Rover Defender	Brand Ambassador All Terrain	

=== Magazine covers ===
Since her debut, Dilraba Dilmurat also appeared on the cover of multiple fashion magazines. The list of 2023 covers is shown in the table below:

Year & Month	Magazine	Ref.
2023 May	Elle	
2023 April	TMagazine China	
2023 March	新视线Wonderland	
2023 March	时装L'Officiel	
2023 January	SoFigaro中文版	

=== Philanthropy ===
On August 29, 2012, Dilraba went to a charity house in Xinjiang, and visited the local orphans.

In 2015, Dilraba joined the Network tree planting and greening project initiated by China Green Foundation's Action for Protecting Nature. In the same year, she was invited to participate in the "dressing together to help love" public welfare activity held by Bazaar Star Charity Night, and all the charity sale funds obtained from the event were donated.

In 2016, Dilraba participated in the MAKEAPROMISE campaign to help the children who suffer from wars, diseases, and natural disasters. The campaign is held by UNICEF and Louis Vuitton, aimed to support more children in need around the world.

In 2017, Dilraba participated in the online charity auction initiated by Bazaar Star Charity Night, and she donated a silver waist chain to fundraise more money for having more ambulances in remote cities in China.

In 2018, Dilraba participated in the public welfare project to support the "Medical Insurance for Diseases", helping to alleviate China's health and poverty issues. She saved 25 million children in 585 poverty counties from being impoverished due to illness. In March, Dilraba call on more people to pay attention to the education of adolescent girls in China. In November, Dilraba was invited by Alibaba company to become a public welfare star in poverty alleviation in China, and invited everyone in the country to join her in helping the revitalization of her home region of Xinjiang.

In 2019, Dilraba was invited to join a media action named "China YOUNG", and she was nominated as one of the leaders of the campaign. In September, together with reporters from Global magazine, Dilraba followed the Forestry and Grassland Bureau of Tibet to go deep into the Qiangtang Plateau to explore the local protection actions of wild animals.

In 2021, Dilraba donated 500,000 RMB to Henan to help the province recover from a storm.

== Personal life ==
=== Stalker incident ===
On June 7, 2020, while Dilraba was on a variety show to promote products from impoverished farmers in Hunan, a male audience member went on stage, tapped her on the shoulder, got down on one knee and proposed to her with a ring. Wang Han, the show's host, stepped in between them and asked the crew to escort him off the stage. The man had reportedly been stalking her for half a year. Chinese netizens criticised the lax security measures and on June 10, expressed their outrage when authorities at Changsha only gave him 7 days detention as punishment. Further condemnation followed after the man showed a lack of remorse when released.

== Filmography ==
=== Film ===
Year	English title	Chinese title	Role	Ref.
2015	Fall in Love Like a Star	怦然星动	Hao Meili	
2017	Mr. Pride vs Miss Prejudice	傲娇与偏见	Tang Nannan	
2017	Namiya	解忧杂货店	Tong Tong	
2018	21 Karat	21克拉	Liu Jiayin	
2026	Kung Fu Soccer	功夫女足	Yu Long	
TBA	Legend of Sun and Moon	日月	Chang'e	

==== Short film ====
Year	English title	Chinese title	Role	Notes
2017	Lost in Your Eyes	—N/a	Alex	Harper's Bazaar film
2018	Live for Real	热舞吧！青春	Xiao Zi	Oppo film
2018	Come Across Love	不期而遇	Xiao Ji	Tencent fashion film
2018	Model	模特		Vogue film
2021	Date	约会	Li Li	
2021	Dreams Comes True	造相馆	Herself	
2022	Button Life	纽扣人生	Xiao Jin	Vogue film

=== Television series ===
Year	English title	Chinese title	Role	Notes	Ref.
2013	Anarhan	阿娜尔罕	Anarhan		
2014	Swords of Legends	古剑奇谭	Fuqu		
2014	V Love	微时代	Wu Anpo / Amber		
2014	Cosmetology High	美人制造	Qing Cheng	Cameo (Ep. 3–6)	
2014	The Sound of Desert	风中奇缘	Li Ji		
2015	The Backlight of Love	逆光之恋	Jiang Li		
2015	Diamond Lover	克拉恋人	Gao Wen		
2015	Legend of Ban Shu	班淑传奇	Princess Loulan		
2016	The Ladder of Love	爱的阶梯	Song Zihan		
2016	Six Doors	六扇门	Su Yiqing		
2016	Hot Girl	麻辣变形计	Guan Xiaodi		
2017	Pretty Li Huizhen	漂亮的李慧珍	Li Huizhen		
2017	Eternal Love	三生三世十里桃花	Bai Fengjiu		
2017	The King's Woman	秦时丽人明月心	Gongsun Li		
2018	The Flame's Daughter	烈火如歌	Lie Ruge		
2018	Sweet Dreams	一千零一夜	Ling Lingqi		
2020	Eternal Love of Dream	三生三世枕上书	Bai Fengjiu		
2020	Love Designer	幸福,触手可及!	Zhou Fang		
2021	The Long Ballad	长歌行	Li Changge		
2021	You Are My Glory	你是我的荣耀	Qiao Jingjing		
2022	The Blue Whisper	驭鲛记	Ji Yunhe		
2023	Prosecution Elites	公诉精英	An Ni		
2023	Legend of Anle	安乐传	Ren Anle / Di Ziyuan		
2025	Sword Rose	利剑玫瑰	Deng Yan		
2025	Love on the Turquoise Land	枭起青壤	Nie Jiuluo		
2026	Love Beyond the Grave	白日提灯	He Simu / He Xiaoxiao		
TBA	A Duet in Blue	虽然不能同时拥有一切	Wei Lan		

=== Variety shows ===
Year	English title	Chinese title	Role	Network	Ref.
2017	Keep Running	奔跑吧	Cast member (Season 5)	Zhejiang TV	
2018	Travel, Feel the World	慢游全世界	Cast member		
2019	Produce Camp 2019	创造营	Presenter	Tencent	
2019	Go Fighting!	极限挑战5	Cast member	Dragon TV	
2019	Travel, Feel the World	慢游全世界	Cast member	Beijing TV	
2023	Divas Hit The Road: Silk Road Season	花儿与少年·丝路季	Cast member	Hunan TV	
2024	The Truth Season 2	开始推理吧 (第二季)	Cast member	Tencent	
2025	The Truth Season 3	开始推理吧 (第三季)	Cast member	Tencent	

== Discography ==
=== Singles ===
Year	English title	Chinese title	Album	Notes
2014	"Our Era"	我们的时代	V Love OST	With various artists
2016	"Love in My Heart"	爱在心中	The Ladder of Love OST	
2017	"Be Together Without Worries"	漂亮的在一起	Pretty Li Huizhen OST	
2017	"Can't Bear To"	舍不得	Pretty Li Huizhen OST	
2017	"Mr. Pride vs Miss Prejudice"	傲娇与偏见	Mr. Pride vs Miss Prejudice OST	With Zhang Yunlong
2017	"A Lifetime of Adventure"	赴一场生命的冒险	God Slayer OST	
2018	"Good Luck Gathers in a Sweet"	好运聚一糖		Theme song for advertisement of 阿尔卑斯糖
2018	"Yu Huo Cheng Shi"	浴火成诗	The Flame's Daughter OST	with Mao Buyi
2019	"China Happy Events"	中国喜事		Performance for CCTV Spring Gala
2019	"Grow in Light"	向上的光		Theme song for 中国YOUNG计划
2019	"Unlimited"	无限	Sheng Zai Zhong Guo	
2019	"Today is Your Birthday"	今天是你的生日		
2020	"Deliberately"	偏偏	Eternal Love of Dream OST	With Silence Wang
2020	"Hand in Hand"	手足		Charity song for COVID-19 aid workers
2024	"Episode X"	第十幕		Song celebrating a decade of her career

== Accolades ==
=== Awards and nominations ===
Year	Award	Category	Nominated work	Result	Ref.
Major awards
2015	7th China TV Drama Awards	Best New Actress	Diamond Lover	Won	
2016	1st China Britain Film Festival	Best Newcomer	Mr. Pride vs Miss Prejudice	Won	
2016	19th Huading Awards	Best Supporting Actress	Diamond Lover	Nominated	
2017	23rd Shanghai Television Festival	Best Supporting Actress	Eternal Love	Nominated	
2017	8th Macau International Television Festival	Best Supporting Actress	Eternal Love	Nominated	
2018	Shanghai International Film and Television Festival Internet Summit	Best Actress (Web drama)	The Flame's Daughter	Won	
2018	Golden Bud – The Third Network Film And Television Festival	Best Actress (Web Drama)	The Flame's Daughter	Nominated	
2018	5th The Actors of China Award Ceremony	Outstanding Actress (Web Drama Category)	The Flame's Daughter	Nominated	
2018	12th China Golden Eagle TV Art Festival	Golden Eagle Goddess	Dilraba Dilmurat	Won	
2018	12th China Golden Eagle TV Art Festival	Most Popular Actress	Pretty Li Huizhen	Won	
2018	29th China TV Golden Eagle Award	Best Actress	Pretty Li Huizhen	Won	
2019	17th Golden Phoenix Awards	Newcomer Award	Namiya	Won	
2020	2nd Asia Contents Awards	Best Actress	Eternal Love of Dream	Nominated	
2020	Busan International Film Festival	Best Rising Star	Eternal Love of Dream	Won	
2026	CMG China Film & Television Night	CMG Recommended Actress of the Year	Sword Rose	Won	
Other awards
2014	Fashion Power Awards	New Artiste Award	Dilraba Dilmurat	Won	
2016	Chinese Campus Art Glory Festival	Most Popular Role Model Artist	Dilraba Dilmurat	Won	
2016	23rd Cosmo Beauty Ceremony	Young Idol Award	Dilraba Dilmurat	Won	
2016	5th iQiyi All-Star Carnival	Best Rising Actress	Dilraba Dilmurat	Won	
2016	ENAwards	Outstanding New Actress	Hot Girl	Won	
2017	10th Elle Fashion Awards	Popular Idol Award	Dilraba Dilmurat	Won	
2017	11th Tencent Video Star Awards	Most Popular Actress	Dilraba Dilmurat	Won	
2017	10th The Mango TV Awards	Most Popular Actress	Dilraba Dilmurat	Won	
2017	Powerstar Award Ceremony	Most Popular Chinese Actress	Dilraba Dilmurat	Won	
2017	Powerstar Award Ceremony	Popular Star of the Year	Dilraba Dilmurat	Won	
2018	China Screen Ranking	Newcomer of the Year	Dilraba Dilmurat	Won	
2018	Youku Choice Awards	Global Popular Idol	Dilraba Dilmurat	Won	
2018	Golden Data Entertainment Award	Hottest Actress Online	Dilraba Dilmurat	Won	
2018	Golden Data Entertainment Award	Actress with the Highest Fans Appeal	Dilraba Dilmurat	Won	
2018	China Entertainment Index Award	Most Commercially Valuable Artist	Dilraba Dilmurat	Won	
2018	2018 Weibo V Influence Summit	Top 10 Positive Energy Models	Dilraba Dilmurat	Won	
2018	Powerstar Award Ceremony	Most Popular Actress	Dilraba Dilmurat	Won	
2019	Weibo Awards Ceremony	Person of the Year	Dilraba Dilmurat	Won	
2019	Golden Tower Award	Most Popular Actress	Dilraba Dilmurat	Won	
2019	Cosmo Glam Night	Person of the Year (Dream)	Dilraba Dilmurat	Won	
2019	Tencent Video All Star Awards	VIP Star	Dilraba Dilmurat	Won	
2019	Powerstar Award Ceremony	Most Popular Chinese Actress	Dilraba Dilmurat	Won	
2019	Jinri Toutiao Awards Ceremony	Most Noticed Female Celebrity	Dilraba Dilmurat	Won	
2020	Weibo Awards Ceremony	Popular Artist of the Year	Dilraba Dilmurat	Won	
2020	Tencent Video All Star Awards	Most Popular Actress	Eternal Love of Dream	Won	
2020	Tencent Video All Star Awards	VIP Star	Dilraba Dilmurat	Won	
2020	Powerstar Award Ceremony	Most Popular Chinese Actress	Dilraba Dilmurat	Won	
2020	Powerstar Award Ceremony	Most Influential Actress	Dilraba Dilmurat	Won	
2023	Tencent Video All Star Night 2023	VIP Star		Won	

=== Listicles ===
Publisher	Year	List	Placement	Ref.
Forbes	2017	China Celebrity 100	37th	
Forbes	2019	China Celebrity 100	16th	
Forbes	2020	China Celebrity 100	11th	

== See also ==
- Neghmet Rakhman
- Perhat Khaliq
