= Eternal Love (Chinese TV series) =

2017 Chinese television series

- Also known as: Ten Miles of Peach Blossoms
- Genre: Romance; Fantasy; Xianxia
- Based on: Three Lives, Three Worlds, Ten Miles of Peach Blossoms by TangQi GongZi
- Written by: Hong Qiu
- Directed by: Lam Yuk-fan; Yu Cuihua; Ren Haitao
- Starring: Yang Mi; Mark Chao
- Opening theme: "Three Lives, Three Worlds" by Jason Zhang
- Ending theme: "Bracing the Chill " by Zhang Bichen & Aska Yang
- Country of origin: China
- Original language: Mandarin
- No. of episodes: 58

Production
- Production locations: Xiangshan Movie & Television Town, Yunnan
- Running time: 45 mins
- Production companies: Gcoo Entertainment; Jay Walk Studio; San Weihuo

Original release
- Network: Dragon TV, Zhejiang TV
- Release: 30 January – 1 March 2017

Related
- Eternal Love of Dream; Love and Destiny

Eternal Love (Chinese: 三生三世十里桃花; pinyin: Sānshēngsānshìshílǐtáohuā), also known as Three Lives, Three Worlds, Ten Miles of Peach Blossoms, is a 2017 Chinese television series starring Yang Mi and Mark Chao, directed by Lin Yufen. It is based on the xianxia novel of the same name from 2015 by Tang Qi Gong Zi. The series was broadcast on Zhejiang TV and Dragon TV from 30 January to 1 March 2017.

As of 1 August 2018, the series had reached 50 billion views, becoming the most watched television series in the world.

== Synopsis ==
In Eternal Love, the female and male protagonists follow each other across time and space to change their destiny of becoming separated.

The story begins when Zhe Yan (Ken Chang) brings Bai Qian (Yang Mi), disguised as the male immortal Si Yin, to Kunlun Mountain, where she becomes the God of War, Mo Yuan's 17th disciple and receives the Jade Purity Fan of Kunlun, which becomes her weapon. For 20,000 years, Bai Qian (as Si Yin), trains and causes quite some trouble. One day, she gets kidnapped by a jealous goddess, Yao Guang, and is then rescued by Mo Yuan. Afterwards, she causes trouble again, this time dragging along the 9th disciple, Ling Yu, and getting captured by the Ghost Lord. After several weeks of being prisoners, they are finally rescued by Mo Yuan again, and this action provokes Qing Cang to declare war on the Celestial Tribe. During this stay in the Ghost Realm, Bai Qian (still as Si Yin) develops feelings for Li Jing, the second prince of the Ghost Tribe. Xuan Nü, who has been staying at Kunlun Mountain for a while, also develops feelings for Li Jing, and by using her ability to morph her appearance into Bai Qian's, she seduces Li Jing, which consequently enrages a heartbroken Bai Qian.

During the war, Bai Qian (still disguised as Si Yin) witnesses the Ghost Tribe breaking into the troop formation, and also witnesses Ling Yu getting killed. After a failed attempt to rescue him, Mo Yuan sends away Ling Yu's body back to Kunlun Mountain. Qing Cang, the Ghost Lord, then uses the Bell of the East Emperor to try and destroy heaven and earth, and so Mo Yuan sacrifices his spirit in order to stop the bell and seal Qing Cang's spirit in it. After seeing Mo Yuan's spiritless body, Bai Qian breaks down into tears. The disciples of Kunlun Mountain soon disperse back to their homes and families.

70,000 years later, Bai Qian, no longer in disguise, had been living in Qing Qiu for the past 70,000 years, not even taking a single step outside of it. Bai Qian, who knows that the seal will be lifted and that Qing Cang could break free at any moment, attempts to re-seal him, she will need more power. In order to ascend to High God she will need to go through a trial which will seal away Bai Qian's memories and powers, causing her to become a mortal woman and forget who she is.

As a mortal woman, she meets Ye Hua (Mark Chao) when he is sent to the mortal realm to take care of the Ghost Tribe's Golden Lion Beast who has been causing havoc. Bai Qian (as a mortal woman) mistakes Ye Hua for a snake, who is in his dragon form, and brings him home to fix his wounds. While she accidentally makes his wounds worse, she did it out of good intentions, and she had offered hospitality anyway, so Ye Hua felt it was necessary to repay her kindness. He goes into the mortal realm, in his human form, and pretended to be heavily wounded. The two unexpectedly fall in love, and Ye Hua gifts her the name of Su Su and they marry, despite the fact that he already had an arranged marriage with Bai Qian of Qing Qiu (who was, unbeknownst to him, in a trial as Su Su).

In order to prevent the same tragedy that happened to Sang Ji, who previously had an arranged marriage with Bai Qian, and Shao Xin, Bai Qian's servant, from befalling, Ye Hua attempts to fake his death while hiding Su Su from the Nine Heavens, especially after she became pregnant with his child. However, Ye Hua's plans were eventually thwarted and Su Su was brought to the Nine Heavens.

Su Jin (Huang Mengying), who is jealous of Ye Hua's love for Su Su, intentionally creates a series of misunderstanding between them and causes Su Su to lose her eyes. After giving birth to A Li, a devastated Su Su jumps off from the Zhu Xian Terrace, an act fatal to all mortals, thinking that Ye Hua had betrayed her. Instead of dying, the seal on her memories and powers is broken, restoring Su Su back to her new goddess status as Bai Qian. Unable to deal with the psychological trauma, Bai Qian asks Zhe Yan for his amnesia potion to erase all her memories of the events after her powers were sealed, and she forgets everything, including meeting Ye Hua.

Three hundred years later, Bai Qian receives an invite to a banquet, and she meets Ye Hua, who mistakes her for Su Su. Another lifetime, another world, Ye Hua recognizes Bai Qian as the woman he loves, but the latter remains indifferent as she does not recognise him. Ye Hua begins to pursue Bai Qian for the second time to regain her affections, and eventually succeeds when his love is requited. Qing Cang, who had gained more power after the death of his first son, attempts to release crimson hellfire onto heaven and earth when he would die via the Bell of the East Emperor, and Ye Hua battles with him and eventually manages to kill the Ghost Lord, but in turn this would unleash the crimson hellfire. Ye Hua sacrifices his spirit to the Bell to stop it from destroying heaven and earth, and Bai Qian is unconsolable after seeing his lifeless body. By this time, Mo Yuan had already awakened after spending 70,300 years trying to repair his spirit, which had been scattered into many pieces.

For three years, Bai Qian kept on seeing Ye Hua, only to realize that it had only been a dream or an illusion. Due to complicated reasons and being in a crystal coffin in the Restful Sea, Ye Hua awakens after only three years of slumber, and is reunited with Bai Qian.

== Cast ==
=== Main ===
- Yang Mi as Bai Qian/Si Yin/Su Su
  - Bai Qian: A white Nine-Tailed Fox. Youngest child of the Fox King and current female monarch of Qingqiu. A well-respected High Goddess in the heavenly realm, who is revered for her beauty. She has a sassy and forthright personality. Although her memories and affection for Ye Hua were erased, she fell in love with him once again when they met in the heavenly realm
  - Si Yin: Alias of Bai Qian when she was the disciple of Mo Yuan. During her times in Kunlun, she fell in love with Li Jing but was later betrayed by him and Xuan Nü. She also developed a deep bond with Mo Yuan as his disciple, and tried all sorts of methods in order to bring him back to life after his soul was destroyed by the Dong Huang bell. As Si Yin, nobody knew that she was a woman except for Zhe Yan, Mo Yuan, Li Jing, and Bai Qian
  - Su Su: Mortal identity of Bai Qian, with her memories and powers sealed by Qing Cang after she successfully re-seals Qing Cang in the Dong Huang bell. She unknowingly fell in love with Ye Hua, married him, and gave birth to their son, A Li. However, due to misunderstandings, she jumped off the Zhu Xian terrace and returned to her goddess identity.
- Mark Chao (Shiyue Anxi (young) ) as Mo Yuan/Jin Lian/Ye Hua/Zhao Ge
  - Mo Yuan: The eldest son of Heavenly Father, and the undefeatable God of War. He is also the Master of Kunlun as well as Bai Qian (Si Yin)'s mentor and Ye Hua's older twin brother. Wise and mature, he is well-respected and revered by all the immortals in the Nine Heavens. Mo Yuan used his soul to seal Qing Cang in the Dong Huang bell and in doing so, shattered his soul. After he defeated Qing Cang, he spent the next 70,300 years piecing his soul back together.
  - Jin Lian: The Golden Lotus residing at Kunlun. Was taken care by Si Yin during her stay in Kun Lun.
  - Ye Hua: A black dragon. Crown Prince of the Nine Heavens. Having bore the responsibility of a future ruler since he was born, Ye Hua has a stoic personality and is more mature than his age. He hides his pain behind his calm exterior, choosing to sacrifice for his loved ones silently. Meeting and falling in love with Su Su during his trip to the mortal world changed his personality, and he becomes more exuberant. When Su Su was forced into the Nine Heavens, he appears to be cold to her in front of company to hide their relationship, believing it was the only way to protect her.
  - Zhao Ge: Mortal reincarnation of Ye Hua. As a punishment for killing the four beasts guarding the divine fungal grass, he was sent to the mortal realm to experience life and death

=== Supporting ===
==== Qing Qiu Fox Tribe ====
- Ken Chang as Zhe Yan
  - A phoenix immortal and one of the few remaining primordial High Gods. He is a good friend of the Bai family, and shares a special relationship with Bai Zhen. He keeps out of the affairs of the eight realms, choosing to guard and nurture the ten miles of peach blossoms he planted. He is good at wine brewing and also possesses remarkable medical skills.
- Zhang Gong as Bai Zhi
  - Also known as Fox King, ruler of Qing Qiu Fox Tribe. Bai Qian, Bai Zhen and Bai Yi's father. He is a powerful god, once defeating the four mythical beasts that guard the Divine Fungal Grass.
- Ma Rui as Fox Queen - Wife of Bai Zhi. Bai Qian, Bai Zhen and Bai Yi's mother.
- Leng Haiming as Bai Yi
  - Second son of the Fox King, Bai Qian's elder brother and Feng Jiu's father. He is feared by the younger generation due to his strict and unyielding demeanor.
- Yu Menglong as Bai Zhen
  - Fourth son of the Fox King, Bai Qian's elder brother. He loves to drink and wishes to live a carefree life. He shares a special relationship with Zhe Yan.
- Dilraba Dilmurat as Bai Fengjiu
  - Bai Yi's daughter and Bai Qian's niece. She is the world's only nine-tailed red fox, and the next monarch of Qing Qiu. Feng Jiu fell in love with Dong Hua when he saved her from being killed by the Golden Lion beast, and thereafter moved into Tai Chen Palace to serve Dong Hua and repay his kindness.
  - Consort Chen: Feng Jiu's mortal identity, when she descended into the mortal realm to assist Dong Hua in completing his love trials.
- Zhang Youhao as Mi Gu
  - A tree spirit who is the housekeeper of Qing Qiu. He is loyal to the Bai family, having served them since youth. Due to the nature of his powers, he is afraid of fire.
- An Yuexi as Shao Xin
  - A snake spirit whom Bai Qian saved, and later becomes her personal attendant. She falls in love with Sang Ji, who was originally Bai Qian's fiancé, and leaves Qing Qiu with him, causing the Fox Tribe to hold a grudge against her. Though Bai Qian doesn't have any resentment toward her, she cannot outwardly forgive Shao Xin because her actions deeply disgraced Qing Qiu.
- Li Ensheng as Bi Fang
  - An immortal beast with the highest cultivation, who can freely roam the world. However, because of his admiration for Bai Qian, he was willing to sacrifice his freedom and becomes Bai Zhen's mount.

==== Nine Heavens ====
- Vengo Gao as Emperor Dong Hua (東華帝君).
  - The Emperor Lord, one of the oldest five Great Kings of Heaven. He is revered by many, but is indifferent toward the admiration he receives. He does not have a care about anyone or anything, until Feng Jiu enters his life. However, he could not be together with her as he had erased his name from the three life stone (that dictates the love destiny of all beings).
  - In the mortal realm, he falls for Consort Chen (Feng Jiu) who later betrays him as part of the love trial Si Ming set up for him. It was later revealed that the love trial was a repayment of Feng Jiu's love for him.
- Jiang Kai as Heavenly Lord Hao De - Ruler of the Nine Heavens.
- Mou Fengbin as Yang Cuo - Heaven Lord's first son, Ye Hua's father.
- Liu Xiaoye as Le Xu - Yang Cuo's wife and Ye Hua's mother.
- Wang Ruolun as Sang Ji
  - Heaven Lord's second son. He was Bai Qian's original fiancé, but falls in love with Shao Xin on his journey to Qing Qiu. He was banished to the Northern Sea Dragon Palace as punishment for cancelling the marriage between him and Bai Qian.
- Li Dongheng as Lian Song
  - Heaven Lord's third son, and Ye Hua's uncle. He is known for his playboy and gossipy tendencies, but he is also Ye Hua's confidante and helped him greatly with his relationship problems. Lian Song was in love with Cheng Yu in her past lifetime.
- Huang Mengying as Su Jin
  - The only descendant of the heavenly Su Jin Tribe, and one of the show's main antagonists. She was adopted by the Heaven Lord after her tribe was wiped out due to war. Her affections for Ye Hua were unrequited, but through her manipulations she becomes Ye Hua's grandfather's (Heaven Lord) concubine. Jealousy overwhelmed her when she realized Ye Hua loved Su Su and she plotted to frame her and steal her eyes by making it seem as if Su Su pushed her off the Zhu Xian Terrace. When Bai Qian recovered her memories as Su Su, she gouges Su Jin's eyes and uncovers her manipulations and crimes. Su Jin's punishment was to guard Qing Cang but eventually got banished to the mortal realm and to never be able to return to the nine heavens for eternity, as retribution for her many heinous crimes.
- Wang Xiao as Si Ming
  - Lord of Dipper of South. He is in charge of life and fate of the human realm, and also serves Dong Hua. He is a gossiper along with Lian Song and Cheng Yu, and is also close with Feng Jiu.
- Wang Ting as Cheng Yu
  - A mortal from the imperial family in her past life when she met and fell in love with Lian Song though they have since broken up. She was brought up from the mortal realm to the Nine Heavens and conferred the title of "Yuan Jun". She enjoys dressing up as a man and hearing romantic tales of love, though enjoys teasing her female friends as well. She becomes close friends with Feng Jiu and often tries to help her get closer to Dong Hua.
- Hummer Zhang as A Li
  - Ye Hua and Su Su (Bai Qian)'s son
- Wang Xiuzhu as Miao Qing
  - Princess of the Eastern Seas, who falls at first sight for Ye Hua. She saved A Li from danger, and using it as an excuse, moves into Xi Wu Palace to become Ye Hua's maid. She was later manipulated by Su Jin to interfere in Ye Hua and Bai Qian's relationship.
- Liu Meilin as Zhi Yue
  - An immortal from Fang Xu Mountains, and Ye Hua's cousin. She is in love with Dong Hua, and makes life difficult for Feng Jiu in Tai Chen Palace.
- Chen Kefan as Yuan Zhen
  - Shao Xin and Sang Ji's son. He was sent to the mortal realm to undergo a trial after being framed by Su Jin.
- Yang Anqi as Nai Nai - Su Su (Bai Qian)'s personal maid.
- Zhang Ranyi as Xin Nu - Su Jin's personal maid, who is willing to go along with her schemes.
- Yu Wentao as Tian Shu - Ye Hua's bodyguard.
- Yu Xuan Hong Hao as Jia Yun - Ye Hua's civil assistant.

==== Kun Lun Mountains ====
- Lai Yi as Die Feng
  - Mo Yuan's senior disciple, and second prince of the Western Seas.
- Song Haijie as Chang Shan
  - Mo Yuan's second disciple. He helped take care of Kun Lun Mountains during Mo Yuan's absence.
- Zhang He as Ling Yu
  - Mo Yuan's ninth disciple. He was kidnapped by the Ghost Lord and forced to be his god-son, and later killed in the war between Nine Heavens and the Ghost Tribe.
- Liu Ruilin as Zi Lan
  - Mo Yuan's sixteenth disciple. He meets and falls in love with Yan Zhi in the human realm, but ultimately could not be together with her.

==== Ghost Tribe ====
- Lian Yiming as Qing Cang
  - Original Ghost Lord, He set his eyes on Ling Yu as a godson, kidnapping him together with Si Yin back into the Great Ziming Palace, which caused a great war between the Ghost Tribe and Nine Heavens. He was sealed thrice in the Dong Huang bell; once by Mo Yuan, once by Bai Qian, and once by Dong Hua. When he finally breaks through the imprisonment, Qing Cang is killed by Ye Hua in a battle.
- Vin Zhang as Li Jing
  - Ghost Tribe's second prince, who becomes the Ghost Lord after his father was sealed by the Dong Huang bell.
    He falls in love with Si Yin, without knowing she is Bai Qian in disguise. When he saw Xuan Nü who resembles Si Yin, he was seduced by her, causing him to inadvertently betray Bai Qian. He later realizes that the only one he ever truly loved was Si Yin.
- Zhu Xudan as Xuan Nü
  - Bai Qian's childhood friend. She has always envied Bai Qian's beauty and because of this, Bai Qian granted her the ability to morph her appearance to look exactly like Bai Qian whenever she wants. During Xuan Nü's stay at Kun Lun, she used her looks to seduce Li Jing and forced him to marry her. She then acted as a spy for the Ghost Tribe to steal the troop formation from Kun Lun, causing Mo Yuan's army to be defeated. Due to her crimes, she was cursed with the fate of never being able to bear a healthy child.
  - 70,000 years later, Xuan Nü kidnapped Mo Yuan's body and A Li, to exact revenge on Bai Qian while stealing an immortal body to revive her dead child. However, she was defeated by Ye Hua and her appearance was destroyed by Bai Qian. In a fit of shock and horror at seeing her original face, Xuan Nü strikes her eyes, blinding herself. She then dies while trying to retrieve the Divine Fungal Grass to revive her son.
- Du Junze as Li Yuan
  - Ghost Tribe's elder prince. A power-hungry and cruel man whose ambition is to ascend the throne and destroy the immortal tribe. He was later defeated by Li Jing and trapped for thousand of years, and eventually killed by Xuan Nü to make his father more powerful. He's always looked down on Li Jing because they have different mothers.
- Dai Si as Yan Zhi
  - Ghost Tribe's princess. Li Jing's half-sister, Li Yuan's sister from the same mother. She is doted on and loved by her brothers, and is kind-hearted despite being surrounded by evil.
    She fell for Si Yin, not knowing she is a girl. Later on, she meets and falls in love with Zi Lan in the mortal realm but their relationship failed to come to fruition due to the rift between Kunlun Mountain and the Ghost Tribe.
- Huang Tianqi as Fire Qilin
  - Li Jing's mount, who grew up with him and is one of his closest friends.
- Ren Tao as Golden Lion Beast
  - Qing Cang's mount. After Li Yuan is imprisoned by Li Jing, he leaves the Ghost Realm and goes into hiding. He is devoted to Qing Cang and Li Yuan, but is also willing to protect Yan Zhi with his life.
Extended cast
- Li Xinyi as Yao Guang, a high goddess in love with Mo Yuan who sacrificed herself in the war between Nine Heavens and the Ghost Tribe.
- Jin Feng as Lu Xiu, Chang Hai's second princess.
- Zhao Yansong as Father Immortal, Creator of Heaven and Earth
- Wang Bin as High Priest Ling Bao, Ye Hua's senior brother
- Ye Xinyu as High Priest Pu Hua
- Zhao Xinhuan as Medicine King
- Li Dong as Tudigong
- Jia Wei as Ruler of Chang Hai
- Li Tong as Elder Princess of Chang Hai
- Feng Xueya as Li Ying, Li Jing's daughter
- Liu Gugai as Ruler of Eastern Seas
- Yu Zikuan as Ruler of Western Seas
- Li Hua Xinyi as Queen of Western Seas
- Sun Jiaolong as Leader of the Merman
- Yang Binxin as Leaf Spirit
- Wan Ziling as Mushroom Spirit
- Sun Liyang as Pipa Spirit
- Lin Meiyan as Grape Spirit
- Zhang Fan as Grey Wolf Spirit
- Liu Weimin as Squirrel Spirit
- Liu Xiaowan as Rain Immortal
- Gan Liying as Xuan Nü's mother
- Lu Meifang as Empress
- Zhang Chao as Consort De
- Liu Wei as Consort Xian
- Mei Yun as Taoist Nun
- Du Xiujun as Fu Zi
- Yi Qiang as little Tou Mu
- Fu Huafeng as Die Yong
- Chen Baobao as Consort Chen's maid
- Tian Na as Yao Guang's subordinate
- Wang Donghong as Yao Guang's subordinate
- Zhang Xinrong as Heaven Warrior
- Meng Xiangliang as Warrior
- Hou Ruixiang as young vigilante
- Lu Xu as young Eunuch
- Yu Zhimei as Grandma
- Zhang Wenjun as Bully
- Yao Xiaobao as Bully

== Production ==
The series began production in 2015. Primarily crew members was announced; with Lam Yuk-fan as the director, Zhang Shuping as the style director, Chen Haozhong as the art director and Zhang Shijie as the costume designer. It was announced that Gcoo Entertainment (a subsidiary of Huace Studio) will produce the drama.

Principal photography began on February 10, 2016, at Xiangshan Movie & Television Town. The whole crew wrapped up filming on June 30, 2016. Filming also took place in Puzhehei, Yunnan. More than 80% of the sets were newly built in order to avoid replication.

== Soundtrack ==
Eternal Love Original Soundtrack (OST)

Soundtrack album by Various Artists
- Released: February 18, 2017
- Genre: Mandopop; Ballad
- Language: Mandarin
- Label: Shanghai Xigua Music Productions

The Eternal Love OST was digitally released on February 18, 2017. The popularity of the series has led to the soundtrack, "Bracing the Chill" to become one of the most covered songs in 2017. The soundtracks and background music were released on three discs, with a total of 60 tracks.

No.	Title	Lyrics	Music	Singer	Length
1.	"Three Lives, Three Worlds (三生三世)" (Opening theme song)	Tan Xuan	Dai Yuedong, Tan Xuan	Jason Zhang	4:17
2.	"Bracing the Chill (凉凉)" (Ending theme song)	Tan Xuan	Liu Chang	Zhang Bichen, Yang Zongwei	5:33
3.	"Cherished Memory (思慕)"	Tan Xuan	Luan Jie	Yisa Yu	5:07
4.	"Even If There's No possibility (就算没有如果)"	Tan Xuan	Luan Jie	Xiang Xiang	5:05
5.	"Blooming Flowers (繁花)"	Dong Zhen	Dong Zhen	Dong Zhen	3:45

== Reception ==
Eternal Love is a commercial success in China, with over 50 billion views on Chinese streaming sites, making it the most viewed Chinese drama. The series also surpassed 1% in ratings on both television stations, averaging 1.288% on Dragon TV and 1.041% on Zhejiang TV.

The series has also attracted large number of foreign fans, which was said to mark a new renaissance for Chinese television. Its success factors were attributed to its beautiful scenes, poetic dialogues and popular stars; as well as the strong fanbase of its original novel.

=== Ratings ===
Dragon TV ratings
Air date	Episode #	Ratings (%)	Audience share (%)	Rank
2017.1.30	1-2	0.597	1.907	3
2017.1.31	3-4	0.575	1.840	4
2017.2.1	5-6	0.479	1.473	7
2017.2.2	7-8	0.634	1.887	4
2017.2.3	9-10	0.722	2.059	4
2017.2.4	11	0.909	2.691	2
2017.2.5	12-13	1.134	3.206	2
2017.2.6	14-15	0.987	2.780	2
2017.2.7	16-17	1.036	2.817	3
2017.2.8	18-19	1.043	2.845	3
2017.2.9	20-21	1.129	3.120	2
2017.2.10	22-23	1.118	3.667	2
2017.2.11	24	0.971	2.869	1
2017.2.12	25-26	1.479	4.238	1
2017.2.13	27-28	1.511	4.281	1
2017.2.14	29-30	1.434	4.207	1
2017.2.15	31-32	1.401	3.968	1
2016.2.16	33-34	1.527	4.396	1
2017.2.17	35-36	1.630	4.528	1
2017.2.18	37	1.467	4.384	1
2017.2.19	38-39	1.629	4.534	1
2017.2.20	40-41	1.629	4.521	1
2017.2.21	42-43	1.576	4.344	1
2017.2.22	44-45	1.613	4.501	1
2017.2.23	46-47	1.568	4.429	1
2017.2.24	48-49	1.575	4.397	1
2017.2.25	50	1.600	4.615	1
2017.2.26	51-52	1.658	4.655	1
2017.2.27	53-54	1.674	4.978	1
2017.2.28	55-56	1.679	5.006	1
2017.3.1	57-58	1.910	5.542	1
Average ratings		1.288	3.69	1

- Highest ratings are marked in red, lowest ratings are marked in blue

=== Awards and nominations ===
Year	Award	Category	Nominated work	Result	Ref.
2017	23rd Shanghai Television Festival	Best Actor	Mark Chao	Nominated	
2017	23rd Shanghai Television Festival	Best Supporting Actress	Dilraba Dilmurat	Nominated	
2017	8th Macau International Television Festival	Best Television Series	Eternal Love	Nominated	
2017	8th Macau International Television Festival	Best Actress	Yang Mi	Nominated	
2017	8th Macau International Television Festival	Best Supporting Actress	Dilraba Dilmurat	Nominated	

== International broadcast ==
- Malaysia Astro Quan Jia HD (From Apr 5, Daily 7PM)
- Singapore
  - VV Drama (From Apr 8, Sat 7:15 PM, After on Jun 10 Onwards, Sat-Sun 7:15 PM)
  - MediaCorp Channel 8 (From Sep 27, 2018, Weekdays 11 PM)
- Hong Kong TVB Jade (U.S, Australia Version: From May 8, Weekday 8:30 PM, HK Version: From Jun 12, Weekday 7Pm)
- South Korea Chunghwa TV (From May 22, Weekday 10Pm)
- Taiwan CTV (From Jul 20, Weekday 8-10 PM)
- Malaysia,Indonesia Oh!K (Coming Soon, Wed - Fri 6 PM MAL, 5PM JKT/BKK)
- Vietnam VTV3 (From Jul 19, Weekday 12PM)
- Cambodia CTV 8 HD (8 May 2017)
- Thailand Channel 3 (From Mar 25, 2019, Mondays to Fridays 12:30PM)
- Hong Kong myTV SUPER (22 May 2020)
- Peru PANTEL (19 Jul 2020)

== See also ==
- Once Upon a Time (2017 film)
