= Jiaxing Media =

Chinese media company

Jiaxing Media (Jay Walk Studio)
- Industry: Film & television production
- Founded: 2013
- Key people: Yang Mi; Dilraba Dilmurat; Zeng Jia; Zhao Ruoxiao
- Products: Films, Television series

Jiaxing Media (Chinese: 嘉行传媒), also known as Jay Walk Studio, is a Chinese entertainment and media company established in 2013 that primarily invests in and produces television shows catering to the younger market. It is headquartered in Beijing and owned in part by the actress Yang Mi.

== History ==
- 2012: Jaywalk Studio is established by Yang Mi in collaboration with H&R Century Pictures.
- 2013: The company becomes official.
- March 2014: Yang Mi and her two managers, Zeng Jia and Zhao Ruoxiao, invest US$450,000 into Jay Walk World Studio. Each owns 19% of the company's shares.
- June 2017: The company announces that it has secured US$36.8 million of new shares. Consequently, the company's market capitalisation is worth US$700 million.
- 2017: Jaywalk Studio reached a deal with Walt Disney Studios to develop live action films in China.
- 2018: Jaywalk Studio announces a new subsidiary called Jaywalk Newjoy, which will serve as a management agency for a new generation of idols.

== Artists ==
=== Independent Studio ===
- Dilraba Dilmurat (迪丽热巴)

=== Male ===
- Vengo Gao Weiguang (高伟光)
- Leon Zhang Yunlong (张云龙)
- Wayne Liu Ruilin (刘芮麟)
- Leon Lai Yi (赖艺)
- Lawrence Wang Xiao (王骁)
- Zhu Zijie (祝子杰)
- Wang Yiming (王一鸣)
- Yi Daqian (易大千)
- Fan Zhixin (樊治欣)
- Zhou Keyu (周柯宇)

=== Female ===
- Daisy Dai Si (代斯)
- Faye Wang Yifei (王一菲)
- Yuan Yuxuan (袁雨萱)
- Li Tingting (李婷婷)
- Sabrina Zhuang (庄达菲)
- Cui Wenmeixiu (崔文美秀)
- Feng Wanhe (冯琬贺)
- Ge Shimin (葛施敏)
- Qiu Tian (邱天)
- Tian Jingfan (田京凡)
- Tian Xuan'ning (田轩宁)
- Bubble Zhu Linyu (朱林雨)

=== Former ===
- Bian Yu (边宇)
- Xiao Yuyu (肖雨雨)
- Yang Chengcheng (杨诚诚)
- Wang Lidan (王俐丹)
- Sierra Li Xirui (李溪芮)
- Hawick Liu Kaiwei (劉愷威)
- Vin Zhang Binbin (张彬彬)
- Mimi Yang Mi (杨幂)
- Viyo He Haonan (何浩楠)
- Peter Qian Zhengyu (钱政宇)
- Rita Wang Yijin (王艺瑾)
- Bambi Zhu Xudan (祝绪丹)

== Productions ==
=== Film ===
| Year | English Title | Chinese Title |
|---|---|---|
| 2015 | You Are My Sunshine (2015 film) | 何以笙箫默 |
| 2015 | The Witness (2015 Chinese film) | 我是证人 |
| 2015 | Fall in Love Like a Star | 怦然星动 |
| 2017 | Mr. Pride vs Miss Prejudice | 傲娇与偏见 |
| 2017 | Reset | 逆时营救 |
| 2017 | Brotherhood of Blades 2 | 绣春刀·修罗战场 |
| 2018 | Baby | 宝贝儿 |

=== Television series ===
| Year | English Title | Chinese Title |
|---|---|---|
| 2013 | A Clear Midsummer Night | 盛夏晚晴天 |
| 2014 | V Love | 微时代 |
| 2014 | Swords Of Legends | 古剑奇谭 |
| 2016 | First Love | 柠檬初上 |
| 2016 | The Interpreter | 亲爱的翻译官 |
| 2017 | Pretty Li Hui Zhen | 漂亮的李慧珍 |
| 2017 | Eternal Love | 三生三世十里桃花 |
| 2017 | Full Love | 周末父母 |
| 2017 | Ugly Girl Hai Ru Hua | 囧女翻身之嗨如花 |
| 2018 | Negotiator | 谈判官 |
| 2018 | The Flame's Daughter | 烈火如歌 |
| 2018 | Sweet Dreams | 一千零一夜 |
| 2018 | Legend of Fuyao | 扶摇 |
| 2019 | In Youth | 趁我们还年轻 |
| 2019 | The Great Craftsman | 筑梦情缘 |
| 2020 | Eternal Love of Dream | 三生三世枕上书 |
| 2021 | Storm Eye | 暴风眼 |
| 2021 | Remember My Boy | 我曾记得那男孩 |
| 2021 | The Other Half of Me and You | 另一半的我和你 |
| 2021 | Novoland: Pearl Eclipse | 斛珠夫人 |
| TBA | Simmer Down | 好好说话 |
| TBA | Thank You Doctor | 谢谢你医生 |
| TBA | She and Her Perfect Husband | 爱的二八定律 |
| TBA | Miss Chun is a Litigator | 春家小姐是讼师 |
| TBA | Mirror Flower Romance | 镜花奇缘 |
