= List of Girls Planet 999 contestants =

Girls Planet 999 is a South Korean reality television show, where trainees from China, (Note: Contestants from Hong Kong and Taiwan are categorised under China.) Japan and South Korea competed to debut in a nine-member girl group. The 99 contestants formed three large groups, consisting 33 contestants from each nationality. After the final episode, the final top nine contestants were selected to debut as members of the girl group Kep1er.

== Contestants ==
The English names of all contestants are presented in Eastern order (Note: Family name followed by given name.) in accordance with the official website.

The ages of all contestants are presented in accordance with the international age system as of Episode 1 (August 6, 2021).

Color key:

Final member of Kep1er
Contestant was eliminated in the final episode
Contestant was eliminated in the third elimination round
Contestant was eliminated in the second elimination round
Contestant was eliminated in the first elimination round
Contestant left the show
Planet Top 9 for the Episode
Saved with Planet Pass (Note: The Planet Pass is a vote by the mentors, where eliminated contestants are given a chance to be saved from elimination.)

List of Girls Planet 999 contestants
Company	Contestant	Age (Note: As of Episode 1 (August 6, 2021))	Ranking (Note: Except for the first two episodes, Points were calculated using this formula: [Number of Korean Votes × (Overall Total Votes ÷ Total Korean Votes)] + [Number of International Votes × (Overall Total Votes ÷ Total International Votes)].)																										
Company	Contestant	Age	Episode 1 – 2 (Note: The initial evaluation ranking was based on the theme song evaluation; where 50% of the score was evaluated by peers while the other 50% was evaluated by the mentors.) (Note: The Planet Top 9 rankings in Episode 2 were based on the mentors' choice.)	Episode 3 (Note: The Cell Points shown in Episode 3 are as of August 20, 2021 at 10AM KST.)				Episode 5 (Note: The Cell Points shown in Episode 5 are inclusive of those shown in Episode 3.) (Note: The contestants were eliminated in Episode 5 based on their cell ranking, not their individual ranking.)								Episode 8				Episode 9 (Note: As of September 27, 2021, 10AM KST)	Episode 11				<9IRLS NI9HT A9IT> Special Live (Note: As of October 18, 2021, 10AM KST) (Note: The interim ranking of the contestants was revealed during the <9IRLS NI9HT A9IT> Special Live on October 18, 2021.)	Episode 12			Final
Company	Contestant	Age	Individual	Cell				Cell (Note: Only the Cell Points of surviving cells were shown in Episode 5.)				Individual (Note: Only the Individual Points of Top 9 were shown in Episode 5.)				Individual				Individual	Individual				Individual	Individual			
Company	Contestant	Age	#	#	Votes		Points	#	Votes		Points	#	Votes		Points	#	Votes		Points	#	#	Votes		Points	#	#	Votes (Note: Korean and International votes were not shown during the finale live broadcast.) (Note: Votes and Points of eliminated trainees were taken from Universe app.) (Note: Result of both Korean and International Votes.)	Points (Note: Votes and Points of eliminated trainees were taken from Universe app.)	#
Company	Contestant	Age	#	#	KOR (50%)	INT (50%)	Points	#	KOR (50%)	INT (50%)	Points	#	KOR (50%)	INT (50%)	Points	#	KOR (50%)	INT (50%)	Points	#	#	KOR (50%)	INT (50%)	Points	#	#	Votes	Points	#
K-Group (South Korea)
TOP Media (티오피미디어)	An Jeongmin (안정민)	17	K30	12	15,166	49,660	156,942	15	35,369	130,317	392,201	K17	Not Shown			K13	Not Shown			Eliminated									K13
Wake One Entertainment (웨이크원)	Cho Haeun (조하은)	16	K31	30	2,326	8,909	25,599	33	Not Shown			K32	Not Shown			Eliminated													K32
MNH Entertainment	Choi Hyerin (최혜린)	18	K15	27	2,417	11,051	28,721	30	Not Shown			K27	Not Shown			Eliminated													K27
Blockberry Creative (블록베리크리에이티브)	Choi Yeyoung (최예영)	21	K02	10	17,384	82,073	209,637	10	38,520	196,320	490,970	K13	Not Shown			K17	Not Shown			Eliminated									K17
Cube Entertainment (큐브)	Choi Yujin (최유진) (Note: Choi Yujin is a member of girl group CLC.)	24	K06 (P7)	1	98,608	583,713	1,328,882	1	212,454	1,271,738	2,929,629	K01 (P4)	218,207	1,400,513	3,119,661	K01 (P5)	172,398	1,413,857	3,173,040	K02 (P6)	K02 (P5)	79,908	810,873	1,747,716	K02 (P2)	K03 (P3)	428,967	915,722	K03
TOP Media (티오피미디어)	Guinn Myah (Note: Korean Full Name: Son Yena (손예나)) (귄마야)	15	K27	16	9,915	45,059	117,496	11	39,539	185,866	485,596	K09	Not Shown			K06 (P17)	100,559	805,831	1,803,320	K09 (P24)	K09 (P25)	Not Shown			K08 (P8)	K08 (P11)	189,498	625,722	K08
Individual Trainee (개인연습생)	Han Dana (한다나)	19	K16	31	2,289	8,076	24,374	32	Not Shown			K33	Not Shown			Eliminated													K33
IST Entertainment (아이에스티)	Huening Bahiyyih (Note: Korean full name: Jung Bahiyyih (정바히에) Full name: Bahiyyih Jaleh Huening (바히에 잘레 휴닝)) (휴닝바히에)	17	K26	5	40,800	228,763	534,755	7	74,346	445,608	1,025,869	K06	Not Shown			K08 (P24)	74,416	745,996	1,503,092	K06 (P13)	K06 (P13)	52,650	584,860	1,238,862	K05 (P5)	K02 (P2)	525,465	923,567	K02
FNC Entertainment	Huh Jiwon (허지원) (Note: Huh Jiwon, Kim Bora and May are members of girl group Cherry Bullet.)	20	K11	13	11,871	67,410	156,595	12	36,570	187,554	467,491	K11	Not Shown			K16	Not Shown			Eliminated									K16
Individual Trainee (개인연습생)	Jeong Jiyoon (정지윤)	20	K05 (P5)	3	56,527	591,510	1,065,592	3	100,869	1,164,252	2,048,599	K15	Not Shown			K12	Not Shown			Eliminated									K12
Blockberry Creative (블록베리크리에이티브)	Joung Min (정민)	17	K25	20	4,924	25,605	62,168	23	Not Shown			K30	Not Shown			Eliminated													K30
143 Entertainment	Kang Yeseo (강예서) (Note: Kang Yeseo was a member of girl groups Busters and CutieL.)	15	K13 (P2)	4	67,700	342,340	843,274	4	144,221	798,637	1,912,854	K02 (P8)	128,658	744,635	1,744,198	K04 (P12)	124,063	1,176,803	2,475,538	K04 (P11)	K05 (P12)	55,606	649,427	1,248,877	K06 (P6)	K06 (P6)	320,312	770,561	K06
FNC Entertainment	Kim Bora (김보라)	22	K03	19	7,668	42,916	100,410	16	26,253	175,610	383,678	K12	Not Shown			K07 (P21)	76,539	870,835	1,662,629	K08 (P21)	K07 (P15)	42,821	555,092	1,023,271	K09 (P11)	K09 (P15)	208,375	503,773	K09
Wake One Entertainment	Kim Chaehyun (김채현)	19	K23	7	37,617	90,870	351,067	5	114,143	325,323	1,153,957	K03 (P9)	142,258	632,422	1,704,528	K02 (P9)	167,558	1,041,887	2,665,915	K03 (P8)	K04 (P11)	81,679	484,151	1,308,669	K01 (P1)	K01 (P1)	363,623	1,081,182	K01
Jellyfish Entertainment (젤리피쉬)	Kim Dayeon (김다연) (Note: Kim Dayeon and Kim Doah were contestants on Produce 48.)	18	K01	9	23,793	58,366	223,105	9	60,699	152,224	589,272	K07	Not Shown			K03 (P10)	174,170	944,347	2,614,923	K01 (P2)	K01 (P2)	166,497	743,967	2,395,726	K03 (P3)	K04 (P4)	219,125	885,286	K04
FENT (에프이엔티)	Kim Doah (김도아) (Note: Kim Doah, Lee Rayeon and Chiayi are members of girl group FANATICS.)	17	K09	6	38,821	212,480	502,682	6	85,568	473,167	1,134,128	K05	Not Shown			K09	Not Shown			Eliminated									K10
Individual Trainee (개인연습생)	Kim Hyerim (김혜림) (Note: Kim Hyerim was a member of girl groups AQUA and LIMESODA.)	22	K04	22	3,960	22,367	52,096	20	Not Shown			K20	Not Shown			K15	Not Shown			Eliminated									K15
Individual Trainee (개인연습생)	Kim Sein (김세인)	16	K24	17	7,159	54,393	110,687	18	Not Shown			K19	Not Shown			Eliminated													K20
Mystic Story (미스틱스토리)	Kim Suyeon (김수연)	18	K19	8	22,857	117,004	286,390	8	46,266	279,300	640,747	K08	Not Shown			K10	Not Shown			K07 (P20)	K08 (P17)	61,544	367,765	989,381	K07 (P7)	K07 (P10)	222,026	650,790	K07
Fantagio (판타지오)	Kim Yeeun (김예은)	16	K32	28	2,401	10,456	27,914	25	Not Shown			K25	Not Shown			Eliminated													K25
Individual Trainee (개인연습생)	Kim Yubin (김유빈)	22	K29	32	1,662	9,526	22,029	31	Not Shown			K31	Not Shown			Eliminated													K31
FNC Entertainment	Lee Chaeyun (이채윤)	15	K17	11	20,585	42,310	183,342	13	43,689	115,755	431,400	K16	Not Shown			K18	Not Shown			Eliminated									K18
Beatmedia Entertainment (비트미디어)	Lee Hyewon (이혜원)	16	K08	14	14,751	45,119	148,979	14	36,345	148,100	419,671	K18	Not Shown			K14	Not Shown			Eliminated									K14
FENT (에프이엔티)	Lee Rayeon (이나연)	19	K18	25	2,825	13,777	34,587	27	Not Shown			K23	Not Shown			Eliminated													K23
Evermore Music (에버모어뮤직)	Lee Sunwoo (이선우)	18	K12	26	2,398	12,400	30,194	24	Not Shown			K24	Not Shown			Eliminated													K24
Individual Trainee (개인연습생)	Lee Yeongyung (이연경) (Note: Lee Yeongyung, Cui Wenmeixiu and Sakamoto Mashiro were former JYP Entertainment trainees.)	18	K33	24	2,798	19,066	40,667	21	Not Shown			K22	Not Shown			Eliminated													K22
Cube Entertainment (큐브)	Lee Yunji (이윤지)	19	K07	29	1,844	13,482	27,886	26	Not Shown			K26	Not Shown			Eliminated													K26
Blockberry Creative (블록베리크리에이티브)	Ryu Sion (류시온)	20	K21	33	1,984	6,347	20,354	29	Not Shown			K28	Not Shown			Eliminated													K28
Biscuit Entertainment	Seo Youngeun (서영은)	16	K10 (P6)	2	83,266	538,479	1,176,035	2	181,070	1,214,153	2,649,735	K04	Not Shown			K05 (P16)	80,496	1,152,513	2,015,176	K05 (P12)	K03 (P9)	51,009	862,836	1,524,572	K04 (P4)	K05 (P5)	442,102	781,657	K05
MNH Entertainment	Sim Seungeun (심승은) (Note: Sim Seungeun is a member of girl group BVNDIT.)	20	K14	21	4,535	21,273	54,526	22	Not Shown			K21	Not Shown			Eliminated													K21
Wake One Entertainment (웨이크원)	Suh Jimin (서지민)	16	K28	23	3,087	17,750	40,982	28	Not Shown			K29	Not Shown			Eliminated													K29
Yes Im Entertainment (예스아이엠)	Yoon Jia (윤지아)	17	K22	18	9,248	34,353	100,515	17	30,539	139,258	370,017	K10	Not Shown			K11	Not Shown			Eliminated									K11
Highline Entertainment (하이라인엔)	You Dayeon (유다연) (Note: Yoo Dayeon was a member of girl group LIPBUBBLE under the stage name "Seoryn".)	23	K20	15	10,777	44,509	122,428	19	Not Shown			K14	Not Shown			Eliminated													K19
C-Group (China, Hong Kong, Taiwan)
Image Music (大象音乐)	Cai Bing (Note: Full Name: Cai Yubing (蔡语冰) / (차이위빙)) (蔡冰) / (차이빙) (Note: Cai Bing is a member of girl group KSGIRLS.)	25	C28 (P8)	1	98,608	583,713	1,328,882	1	212,454	1,271,738	2,929,629	C03 (P7)	168,887	1,038,526	2,361,224	C04 (P8)	148,600	1,179,514	2,682,114	C08 (P26)	C08 (P26)	Not Shown			Eliminated				C08
Yuehua Entertainment (위에화)	Chang Ching (張競) / (장찡) (Note: Chang Ching was a member of girl group AKB48 Team TP (formerly TPE48).)	19	C06	33	1,984	6,347	20,354	29	Not Shown			C22	Not Shown			Eliminated													C23
Yuehua Entertainment (위에화)	Chen Hsinwei (陳昕葳) / (천신웨이) (Note: Chen Hsinwei, Fu Yaning, Wang Yale, Wen Zhe, Xia Yan, Xu Ziyin and Zhang Luofei were contestants on the second season of Youth With You 2.) (Note: Chen Hsinwei is referred to as "Chen Xinwei" in Youth With You 2.)	20	C33	10	17,384	82,073	209,637	10	38,520	196,320	490,970	C05	Not Shown			C06 (P18)	94,663	806,667	1,751,753	C06 (P18)	C06 (P18)	Not Shown		985,266	Eliminated				C06
FENT (에프이엔티)	Chiayi (Note: Full Name: Li Chiayi (李家儀) / (리지아이)) (家儀) / (지아이)	21	C12	13	11,871	67,410	156,595	12	36,570	187,554	467,491	C12	Not Shown			C16	Not Shown			Eliminated									C16
Yuehua Entertainment (위에화)	Chien Tzuling (簡紫翎) / (젠쯔링)	19	C16	21	4,535	21,273	54,526	22	Not Shown			C27	Not Shown			Eliminated													C27
Jaywalk Newjoy (嘉行传媒)	Cui Wenmeixiu (崔文美秀) / (추이원메이시우) (Note: Cui Wenmeixiu, Ma Yuling, Shen Xiaoting and Su Ruiqi were contestants on Produce Camp 2020) (Note: Cui Wenmeixiu is a member of girl group COLOR.)	21	C25	25	2,825	13,777	34,587	27	Not Shown			C26	Not Shown			Eliminated													C26
Gramarie Entertainment (果然娱乐)	Fu Yaning (符雅凝) / (푸야닝)	24	C07	8	22,857	117,004	286,390	8	46,266	279,300	640,747	C07	Not Shown			C07 (P22)	56,285	947,790	1,658,939	C03 (P10)	C02 (P8)	42,833	1,024,070	1,548,272	C02 (P10)	C02 (P12)	419,618	560,606	C02
Top Class Entertainment (TOP CLASS 娱乐)	Gu Yizhou (顾逸舟) / (구이저우)	18	C21	29	1,844	13,482	27,886	26	Not Shown			C20	Not Shown			Eliminated													C22
Individual Trainee (개인연습생)	Ho Szeching (何思澄) / (호쓰칭)	17	C22	30	2,326	8,909	25,599	33	Not Shown			C28	Not Shown			Eliminated													C28
FNC Entertainment	Hsu Nientzu (許念慈) / (쉬니엔츠)	18	C08	5	40,800	228,763	534,755	7	74,346	445,608	1,025,869	C16	Not Shown			C15	Not Shown			Eliminated									C15
Origin Music International	Huang Xingqiao (黄星侨) / (황씽치아오) (Note: Huang Xingqiao was a contestant on The Coming One 3.)	22	C26	4	67,700	342,340	843,274	4	144,221	744,635	1,912,854	C04	Not Shown			C03 (P7)	177,924	1,093,748	2,816,654	C05 (P15)	C05 (P16)	65,934	354,389	1,015,623	C05 (P18)	C05 (P18)	35,054	56,600	C05
Individual Trainee (개인연습생)	Leung Cheukying (梁卓瀅) / (령척잉)	23	C03	11	20,585	42,310	183,342	13	43,689	115,755	431,400	C21	Not Shown			C18	Not Shown			Eliminated									C18
Individual Trainee (개인연습생)	Li Yiman (李伊蔓) / (리이만)	24	C11	7	37,617	90,870	351,067	5	114,143	325,323	1,153,957	C09	Not Shown			C10	Not Shown			Eliminated									C11
STAR48 (丝芭传媒)	Liang Jiao (梁娇) / (량지아오) (Note: Liang Jiao and Liang Qiao are members of GNZ48's Team G and Team Z respectively.)	17	C31	14	14,751	45,119	148,979	14	36,345	148,100	419,671	C10	Not Shown			C09	Not Shown			Eliminated									C10
STAR48 (丝芭传媒)	Liang Qiao (梁乔) / (량치아오)	17	C32	20	4,924	25,605	62,168	23	Not Shown			C15	Not Shown			Eliminated													C20
Filmko Films	Lin Chenhan (林辰涵) / (린천한)	16	C30	31	2,289	8,076	24,374	32	Not Shown			C25	Not Shown			Eliminated													C25
M-IDOL Entertainment (M-IDOL娱乐)	Lin Shuyun (林書蘊) / (린슈윈)	20	C29	32	1,662	9,526	22,029	31	Not Shown			C30	Not Shown			Eliminated													C30
Jaywalk Newjoy (嘉行传媒)	Liu Shiqi (刘诗琦) / (리우쓰치)	22	C17	28	2,401	10,456	27,914	25	Not Shown			C31	Not Shown			Eliminated													C31
Jaywalk Newjoy (嘉行传媒)	Liu Yuhan (刘钰涵) / (리우위한)	16	C18	27	2,417	11,051	28,721	30	Not Shown			C33	Not Shown			Eliminated													C33
STAR48 (丝芭传媒)	Ma Yuling (马玉灵) / (마위링) (Note: Ma Yuling and Wang Qiuru are members of SNH48's Team SII.)	22	C27	22	3,960	22,367	52,096	20	Not Shown			C24	Not Shown			Eliminated													C24
Echo Entertainment	Poon Wingchi (潘穎芝) / (푼윙치)	19	C20	26	2,398	12,400	30,194	24	Not Shown			C29	Not Shown			Eliminated													C29
Top Class Entertainment (TOP CLASS 娱乐)	Shen Xiaoting (沈小婷) / (션샤오팅)	21	C01 (P3)	2	83,266	538,479	1,176,035	2	181,070	1,214,153	2,649,735	C01 (P2)	298,212	1,620,685	3,919,277	C01 (P1)	327,542	2,268,858	5,517,873	C01 (P1)	C01 (P1)	275,176	1,410,236	4,161,699	C03 (P16)	C01 (P9)	425,464	700,663	C01
ETM Skies (ETM活力时代)	Su Ruiqi (苏芮琪) / (수루이치) (Note: Su Ruiqi was a contestant on Produce 101 China.) (Note: Su Ruiqi is a member of girl group Chic Chili.)	20	C02 (P4)	3	56,527	591,510	1,065,592	3	100,869	1,164,252	2,048,599	C02 (P6)	124,836	1,494,945	2,598,795	C02 (P6)	90,167	1,832,969	2,912,831	C02 (P7)	C03 (P10)	41,872	872,106	1,369,169	C01 (P9)	C03 (P13)	418,815	552,878	C03
STAR48 (丝芭传媒)	Wang Qiuru (王秋茹) / (왕치우루)	17	C19	23	3,087	17,750	40,982	28	Not Shown			C32	Not Shown			Eliminated													C32
Jaywalk Newjoy (嘉行传媒)	Wang Yale (王雅乐) / (왕야러)	22	C13	12	15,166	49,660	156,942	15	35,369	130,317	392,201	C13	Not Shown			C12	Not Shown			Eliminated									C13
Star Master Entertainment (匠星娱乐)	Wen Zhe (Note: Full name: Xu Daomeng (徐道梦) / (쉬다오멍)) (文哲) / (원저) (Note: Wen Zhe is a member of girl group Hickey.)	23	C05	17	7,159	54,393	110,687	18	Not Shown			C11	Not Shown			C05 (P15)	97,851	1,176,960	2,197,276	C04 (P14)	C04 (P14)	50,868	575,620	1,121,791	C04 (P17)	C04 (P17)	66,149	88,673	C04
Individual Trainee (개인연습생)	Wu Tammy (吴甜蜜) / (우태미)	18	C04	9	23,793	58,366	223,105	9	60,699	152,224	589,272	C23	Not Shown			C17	Not Shown			Eliminated									C17
Individual Trainee (개인연습생)	Xia Yan (夏研) / (시아옌)	20	C10	24	2,798	19,066	40,667	21	Not Shown			C08	Not Shown			Eliminated													C19
Yuehua Entertainment (위에화)	Xu Ruowei (徐若惟) / (쉬뤄웨이)	20	C24	15	10,777	44,509	122,428	19	Not Shown			C19	Not Shown			Eliminated													C21
T Entertainment	Xu Ziyin (徐紫茵) / (쉬쯔인) (Note: Xu Ziyin was a contestant on The Next Top Bang.)	25	C09	6	38,821	212,480	502,682	6	85,568	473,167	1,134,128	C06	Not Shown			C08 (P23)	82,159	804,038	1,637,433	Left the Show (Note: Xu Ziyin left the show after the second elimination round due to health reasons.)									C09
Yuehua Entertainment (위에화)	Yang Zige (杨梓格) / (양쯔거)	20	C15	16	9,915	45,059	117,496	11	39,539	185,866	485,596	C17	Not Shown			C11	Not Shown			Eliminated									C12
Gramarie Entertainment (果然娱乐)	Zhang Luofei (张洛菲) / (장루오페이)	20	C14	19	7,668	42,916	100,410	16	26,253	175,610	383,678	C18	Not Shown			C14	Not Shown			Eliminated									C14
Yuehua Entertainment (위에화)	Zhou Xinyu (周心语) / (저우신위)	19	C23	18	9,248	34,353	100,515	17	30,539	139,258	370,017	C14	Not Shown			C13	Not Shown			C07 (P23)	C07 (P22)	Not Shown			Eliminated				C07
J-Group (Japan)
Avex Artist Academy	Ando Rinka (安藤梨花) / (안도 린카)	17	J13	21	4,535	21,273	54,526	22	Not Shown			J19	Not Shown			Eliminated													J22
Biscuit Entertainment	Arai Risako (新井理沙子) / (아라이 리사코)	24	J07	6	38,821	212,480	502,682	6	85,568	473,167	1,134,128	J16	Not Shown			J15	Not Shown			Eliminated									J15
Avex Management	Aratake Rinka (荒武凛香) / (아라타케 린카) (Note: Aratake Rinka is the editor-in-chief and mascot girl of teens magazine GAKUSAISUMMIT.)	17	J30	27	2,417	11,051	28,721	30	Not Shown			J20	Not Shown			Eliminated													J23
Avex Artist Academy	Ezaki Hikaru (江崎ひかる) / (에자키 히카루)	17	J01 (P1)	3	56,527	591,510	1,065,592	3	100,869	1,164,252	2,048,599	J02 (P3)	208,676	1,471,455	3,138,429	J03 (P4)	214,409	2,012,295	4,176,316	J01 (P3)	J02 (P4)	117,962	962,870	2,185,083	J01 (P12)	J01 (P7)	387,709	713,322	J01
Individual Trainee (개인연습생)	Fujimoto Ayaka (藤本彩花) / (후지모토 아야카)	21	J33	12	15,166	49,660	156,942	15	35,369	130,317	392,201	J24	Not Shown			J17	Not Shown			Eliminated									J17
FC ENM	Hayase Hana (早瀬華) / (하야세 하나) (Note: Hayase Hana and Kishida Ririka were members of girl group Orange Latte.)	22	J28	19	7,668	42,916	100,410	16	26,253	175,610	383,678	J27	Not Shown			J18	Not Shown			Eliminated									J18
Individual Trainee	Hayashi Fuko (林楓子) / (하야시 후코)	18	J08	20	4,924	25,605	62,168	23	Not Shown			J15	Not Shown			Eliminated													J20
Individual Trainee (개인연습생)	Hiyajo Nagomi (比屋定和) / (히야조 나고미)	21	J17	26	2,398	12,400	30,194	24	Not Shown			J17	Not Shown			Eliminated													J21
Kiss Entertainment (キッス・エンタテインメント)	Ikema Ruan (池間琉杏) / (이케마 루안)	17	J29	28	2,401	10,456	27,914	25	Not Shown			J14	Not Shown			J07 (P19)	112,777	643,995	1,729,825	J05 (P16)	J05 (P19)	Not Shown			Eliminated				J05
Individual Trainee (개인연습생)	Inaba Vivienne (稲葉ヴィヴィアン) / (이나바 비비안)	23	J27	24	2,798	19,066	40,667	21	Not Shown			J22	Not Shown			Eliminated													J25
N.D. Promotion	Ito Miyu (伊藤美優) / (이토 미유)	18	J31	23	3,087	17,750	40,982	28	Not Shown			J12	Not Shown			Eliminated													J19
Individual Trainee (개인연습생)	Kamikura Rei (神藏令) / (카미쿠라 레이)	18	J16	15	10,777	44,509	122,428	19	Not Shown			J25	Not Shown			Eliminated													J27
Individual Trainee (개인연습생)	Kamimoto Kotone (嘉味元琴音) / (카미모토 코토네)	18	J10	16	9,915	45,059	117,496	11	39,539	185,866	485,596	J13	Not Shown			J09	Not Shown			J09 (P25)	J09 (P24)	Not Shown			Eliminated				J09
Individual Trainee (개인연습생)	Kanno Miyu (菅野美優) / (칸노 미유)	20	J26	30	2,326	8,909	25,599	33	Not Shown			J31	Not Shown			Eliminated													J31
Oscar Promotion	Kawaguchi Yurina (川口ゆりな) / (카와구치 유리나) (Note: Kawaguchi Yurina was a member of idol group X21.)	22	J09	2	83,266	538,479	1,176,035	2	181,070	1,214,153	2,649,735	J01 (P1)	342,119	1,816,746	4,446,387	J01 (P2)	271,511	1,991,757	4,661,720	J03 (P5)	J03 (P6)	76,536	870,559	1,692,862	J02 (P13)	J03 (P14)	278,775	525,051	J03
FC ENM	Kishida Ririka (岸田莉里花) / (키시다 리리카) (Note: Sakurai Miu and Kishida Ririka were contestants on Nizi Project.)	20	J14	11	20,585	42,310	183,342	13	43,689	115,755	431,400	J05	Not Shown			J06 (P14)	161,636	693,802	2,221,061	J07 (P19)	J07 (P21)	Not Shown			Eliminated				J07
Individual Trainee (개인연습생)	Kitajima Yuna (北島由菜) / (키타지마 유나)	20	J24	31	2,289	8,076	24,374	32	Not Shown			J32	Not Shown			Eliminated													J32
Individual Trainee (개인연습생)	Kubo Reina (久保玲奈) / (쿠보 레이나) (Note: Kubo Reina was a member of girl group Prizmmy.)	21	J05	10	17,384	82,073	209,637	10	38,520	196,320	490,970	J10	Not Shown			J10	Not Shown			Eliminated									J10
Individual Trainee (개인연습생)	Kuwahara Ayana (桑原彩菜) / (쿠와하라 아야나)	14	J11 (P9)	7	37,617	90,870	351,067	5	114,143	325,323	1,153,957	J09	Not Shown			J12	Not Shown			Eliminated									J12
FNC Entertainment	May (Note: Full Name: Hirokawa Mao (廣川茉音) / (히로카와 마오)) (メイ) / (메이)	16	J12	1	98,608	583,713	1,328,882	1	212,454	1,271,738	2,929,629	J04	Not Shown			J08 (P20)	79,296	839,208	1,696,554	J08 (P22)	J08 (P23)	Not Shown			Eliminated				J08
Biscuit Entertainment	Murakami Yume (村上結愛) / (무라카미 유메)	20	J04	29	1,844	13,482	27,886	26	Not Shown			J23	Not Shown			Eliminated													J26
ND Studio	Nagai Manami (永井愛実) / (나가이 마나미)	20	J22	14	14,751	45,119	148,979	14	36,345	148,100	419,671	J07	Not Shown			J05 (P13)	141,224	981,632	2,363,513	J06 (P17)	J06 (P20)	Not Shown			Eliminated				J06
Individual Trainee (개인연습생)	Nakamura Kyara (中村伽羅) / (나카무라 캬라)	21	J32	32	1,662	9,526	22,029	31	Not Shown			J33	Not Shown			Eliminated													J33
MLD Entertainment	Nonaka Shana (野仲紗奈) / (노나카 샤나)	18	J06	8	22,857	117,004	286,390	8	46,266	279,300	640,747	J06	Not Shown			J04 (P11)	154,863	1,051,516	2,563,703	J04 (P9)	J04 (P7)	103,234	582,949	1,621,602	J04 (P15)	J04 (P16)	147,882	342,370	J04
Individual Trainee (개인연습생)	Okazaki Momoko (岡崎百々子) / (오카자키 모모코) (Note: At the time of the show, Okazaki Momoko was a backup dancer for kawaii metal idol group Babymetal; as of April 2023, she is a full member.) (Note: Okazaki Momoko was a member of idol group Sakura Gakuin from May 2015 to March 2018.)	18	J18	17	7,159	54,393	110,687	18	Not Shown			J21	Not Shown			Eliminated													J24
Individual Trainee	Oki Fuka (沖楓花) / (오키 후카)	21	J23	25	2,825	13,777	34,587	27	Not Shown			J30	Not Shown			Eliminated													J30
Cat's Eye Okinawa	Okuma Sumomo (大熊李) / (오쿠마 스모모)	19	J19	22	3,960	22,367	52,096	20	Not Shown			J29	Not Shown			Eliminated													J29
143 Entertainment	Sakamoto Mashiro (坂本舞白) / (사카모토 마시로)	21	J02	4	67,700	342,340	843,274	4	144,221	798,637	1,912,854	J03 (P5)	180,474	1,332,567	2,784,657	J02 (P3)	214,579	2,288,333	4,578,784	J02 (P4)	J01 (P3)	92,061	1,296,015	2,314,788	J03 (P14)	J02 (P8)	488,519	708,149	J02
Jellyfish Entertainment (젤리피쉬)	Sakamoto Shihona (坂本志穂菜) / (사카모토 시호나)	21	J21	5	40,800	228,763	534,755	7	74,346	445,608	1,025,869	J11	Not Shown			J14	Not Shown			Eliminated									J14
Individual Trainee (개인연습생)	Sakurai Miu (櫻井美羽) / (사쿠라이 미우)	19	J15	9	23,793	58,366	223,105	9	60,699	152,224	589,272	J08	Not Shown			J11	Not Shown			Eliminated									J11
Individual Trainee (개인연습생)	Shima Moka (島望叶) / (시마 모카)	21	J25	18	9,248	34,353	100,515	17	30,539	139,258	370,017	J26	Not Shown			J16	Not Shown			Eliminated									J16
Individual Trainee (개인연습생)	Terasaki Hina (寺崎日菜) / (테라사키 히나)	17	J20	33	1,984	6,347	20,354	29	Not Shown			J28	Not Shown			Eliminated													J28
Individual Trainee (개인연습생)	Yamauchi Moana (山内若杏名) / (야마우치 모아나)	20	J03	13	11,871	67,410	156,595	12	36,570	187,555	467,491	J18	Not Shown			J13	Not Shown			Eliminated									J13

== Cells ==
=== Cell Arrangements ===
Color key:

Cells that are identical to its previous arrangement
Cells that are only replace the one contestant from original cell
Cells that contain Planet Top 9

Cells are teams of three, each comprising a K-Group, a C-Group, and a J-Group contestant. Cells were reshuffled in Episode 2, with priority given to the Planet Top 9 of Episode 2 to select cellmates.

All cells were disbanded in Episode 6 after the first elimination.

Original cells were made prior to the Planet Demo Stage and the contestants were grouped by a Connect Keyword, which is a common interest or trait among the girls in the cell. Connect Keywords were taken from the official Girls Planet 999 social media accounts.

The tables below are numbered in alphabetical order of the K-Group contestants; bold names denotes the Planet Top 9 that chose her new cellmates.

Cell Arrangements
Original Cells					Episode 2				
#	K	C	J	Connect Keyword	#	K	C	J	Cell Name
1	An Jeongmin	Ma Yuling	Shima Moka	Game Lovers	1	An Jeongmin	Wang Yale	Fujimoto Ayaka	Frying Pan
2	Cho Haeun	Xu Ruowei	Arai Risako	Girl who Gnaws Ribs	2	Cho Haeun	Ho Szeching	Kanno Miyu	Rainbow
3	Choi Hyerin	Wang Qiuru	Aratake Rinka	03s	3	Choi Hyerin	Liu Yuhan	Aratake Rinka	890
4	Choi Yeyoung	Wen Zhe	Ito Miyu	Jin Goo Oppa	4	Choi Yeyoung	Chen Hsinwei	Kubo Reina	Thrillien
5	Choi Yujin	Xu Ziyin	Okazaki Momoko	I have My Own Album	5	**Choi Yujin**	Cai Bing	May	22U
6	Guinn Myah	Liu Yuhan	Kuwahara Ayana	Youngest	6	Guinn Myah	Yang Zige	Kamimoto Kotone	(+2)
7	Han Dana	Lin Shuyun	Fujimoto Ayaka	Diligent Part-Timers	7	Han Dana	Lin Chenhan	Kitajima Yuna	LinNaNa
8	Huening Bahiyyih	Hsu Nientzu	Sakamoto Shihona	New Trainee	8	Huening Bahiyyih	Hsu Nientzu	Sakamoto Shihona	Angel World
9	Huh Jiwon	Cai Bing	Sakurai Miu	Girl who loves Chicken Feet	9	Huh Jiwon	Chiayi	Yamauchi Moana	AJA
10	Jeong Jiyoon	Wang Yale	Nakamura Kyara	Top 1 Singer is mine	10	Jeong Jiyoon	Su Ruiqi	**Ezaki Hikaru**	Avengers
11	Joung Min	Liang Qiao	Hayashi Fuko	Crybaby	11	Joung Min	Liang Qiao	Hayashi Fuko	KoMinQi
12	Kang Yeseo	Chiayi	Kamikura Rei	Flexible Girl	12	**Kang Yeseo**	Huang Xingqiao	Sakamoto Mashiro	Let's Go Up the Mountain
13	Kim Bora	Zhang Luofei	Hayase Hana	Girls' Generation	13	Kim Bora	Zhang Luofei	Hayase Hana	Wishlist
14	Kim Chaehyun	Huang Xingqiao	Kanno Miyu	Crayon Shin-Chang	14	Kim Chaehyun	Li Yiman	**Kuwahara Ayana**	Standby Cue
15	Kim Dayeon	Shen Xiaoting	Ezaki Hikaru	C/K/J Top 1	15	Kim Dayeon	Wu Tammy	Sakurai Miu	Lucky 7
16	Kim Doah	Chen Hsinwei	Okuma Sumomo	Beauties	16	Kim Doah	Xu Ziyin	Arai Risako	BOO
17	Kim Hyerim	Xia Yan	Kubo Reina	Main Vocal, It's me	17	Kim Hyerim	Ma Yuling	Okuma Sumomo	Sunlight
18	Kim Sein	Leung Cheukying	Nagai Manami	K-POP Self-Educated Girl	18	Kim Sein	Wen Zhe	Okazaki Momoko	Triangle
19	Kim Suyeon	Fu Yaning	Nonaka Shana	All Rounder	19	Kim Suyeon	Fu Yaning	Nonaka Shana	Break
20	Kim Yeeun	Gu Yizhou	Kawaguchi Yurina	Role-Model	20	Kim Yeeun	Liu Shiqi	Ikema Ruan	KIL
21	Kim Yubin	Yang Zige	Kitajima Yuna	K-Drama Fan	21	Kim Yubin	Lin Shuyun	Nakamura Kyara	(+1)
22	Lee Chaeyun	Lin Chenhan	Ikema Ruan	Acting Girl	22	Lee Chaeyun	Leung Cheukying	Kishida Ririka	Smile
23	Lee Hyewon	Liang Jiao	Kamimoto Kotone	Talkative ENFP	23	Lee Hyewon	Liang Jiao	Nagai Manami	So Cute
24	Lee Rayeon	Wu Tammy	Yamauchi Moana	Language Master	24	Lee Rayeon	Cui Wenmeixiu	Oki Fuka	KimTteokMan
25	Lee Sunwoo	Poon Wingchi	Hiyajo Nagomi	26 Years of Experience in Dancing	25	Lee Sunwoo	Poon Wingchi	Hiyajo Nagomi	Pallete
26	Lee Yeongyung	Cui Wenmeixiu	Sakamoto Mashiro	May have Debuted Together	26	Lee Yeongyung	Xia Yan	Inaba Vivienne	Pretty Savage
27	Lee Yunji	Liu Shiqi	Murakami Yume	Athleticism	27	Lee Yunji	Gu Yizhou	Murakami Yume	Gu Lee Yu
28	Ryu Sion	Chang Ching	Terasaki Hina	Cat Butler	28	Ryu Sion	Chang Ching	Terasaki Hina	Cat Butler
29	Seo Youngeun	Ho Szeching	Inaba Vivienne	Ballerinas	29	Seo Youngeun	**Shen Xiaoting**	Kawaguchi Yurina	It's Okay
30	Sim Seungeun	Chien Tzuling	Ando Rinka	I Know how to Dance	30	Sim Seungeun	Chien Tzuling	Ando Rinka	DanCell
31	Suh Jimin	Zhou Xinyu	May	Giant Girls	31	Suh Jimin	Wang Qiuru	Ito Miyu	Nine-Tailed Fox
32	Yoon Jia	Li Yiman	Oki Fuka	Mint-Chocolate	32	Yoon Jia	Zhou Xinyu	Shima Moka	Do Mi Sol
33	You Dayeon	Su Ruiqi	Kishida Ririka	Survival Once Again	33	You Dayeon	Xu Ruowei	Kamikura Rei	Black Hole

=== Cell Rankings ===
Color key:

Cell was eliminated in the first elimination round
Contestant was saved with the Planet Pass

Cell rankings were revealed after Episode 5 and are based on the number of cell points obtained.

Cells that were eliminated in Episode 5 did not have their cell points displayed.

Cell Rankings
Rank	Survived Cell			Cell Points	Rank	Eliminated Cell		
Rank	K	C	J	Cell Points	Rank	K	C	J
1	Choi Yujin	Cai Bing	May	2,929,629	18	Kim Sein	Wen Zhe	Okazaki Momoko
2	Seo Youngeun	Shen Xiaoting	Kawaguchi Yurina	2,649,735	19	You Dayeon	Xu Ruowei	Kamikura Rei
3	Jeong Jiyoon	Su Ruiqi	Ezaki Hikaru	2,048,599	20	Kim Hyerim	Ma Yuling	Okuma Sumomo
4	Kang Yeseo	Huang Xingqiao	Sakamoto Mashiro	1,912,854	21	Lee Yeongyung	Xia Yan	Inaba Vivienne
5	Kim Chaehyun	Li Yiman	Kuwahara Ayana	1,153,957	22	Sim Seungeun	Chien Tzuling	Ando Rinka
6	Kim Doah	Xu Ziyin	Arai Risako	1,134,128	23	Joung Min	Liang Qiao	Hayashi Fuko
7	Huening Bahiyyih	Hsu Nientzu	Sakamoto Shihona	1,025,869	24	Lee Sunwoo	Poon Wingchi	Hiyajo Nagomi
8	Kim Suyeon	Fu Yaning	Nonaka Shana	640,747	25	Kim Yeeun	Liu Shiqi	Ikema Ruan
9	Kim Dayeon	Wu Tammy	Sakurai Miu	589,272	26	Lee Yunji	Gu Yizhou	Murakami Yume
10	Choi Yeyoung	Chen Hsinwei	Kubo Reina	490,970	27	Lee Rayeon	Cui Wenmeixiu	Oki Fuka
11	Guinn Myah	Yang Zige	Kamimoto Kotone	485,596	28	Suh Jimin	Wang Qiuru	Ito Miyu
12	Huh Jiwon	Chiayi	Yamauchi Moana	467,491	29	Ryu Sion	Chang Ching	Terasaki Hina
13	Lee Chaeyun	Leung Cheukying	Kishida Ririka	431,400	30	Choi Hyerin	Liu Yuhan	Aratake Rinka
14	Lee Hyewon	Liang Jiao	Nagai Manami	419,671	31	Kim Yubin	Lin Shuyun	Nakamura Kyara
15	An Jeongmin	Wang Yale	Fujimoto Ayaka	392,201	32	Han Dana	Lin Chenhan	Kitajima Yuna
16	Kim Bora	Zhang Luofei	Hayase Hana	383,678	33	Cho Haeun	Ho Szeching	Kanno Miyu
17	Yoon Jia	Zhou Xinyu	Shima Moka	370,017				

== Planet Demo Stage (Episodes 1–2) ==
Color key:

Planet Top 9
Planet Top 9 Candidate

The teams were formed based on nationality prior to Episode 1; the team names were taken from Mnet's official YouTube channel, Mnet K-POP.

Note that not all of the Planet Top 9 candidates are fully known as not all performances were fully aired.

Bold team numbers are teams whose performances were partially or entirely unaired on broadcast. (Note: Full versions of the unaired performances were posted to YouTube by Mnet on August 7 (Episode 1) and August 14, 2021 (Episode 2).)

Planet Demo Stage
Performance			Team	Contestant	Performance			Team	Contestant
#	Original artist(s)	Song	Team	Contestant	#	Original artist(s)	Song	Team	Contestant
Episode 1					Episode 2				
1	Produce 48	"Rumor"	Visual Killer	Chen Hsinwei	19	Mamamoo	"Gogobebe" (고고베베)	Joker	Oki Fuka
1	Produce 48	"Rumor"	Visual Killer	Huang Xingqiao	19	Mamamoo	"Gogobebe" (고고베베)	Joker	Kubo Reina
1	Produce 48	"Rumor"	Visual Killer	Shen Xiaoting	19	Mamamoo	"Gogobebe" (고고베베)	Joker	Sakamoto Shihona
1	Produce 48	"Rumor"	Visual Killer	Xu Ruowei	19	Mamamoo	"Gogobebe" (고고베베)	Joker	Ando Rinka
2	Twice	"Fancy"	Crystal Girls	Hayase Hana	20	Apink	"Mr. Chu"	Eighteen Girls	Kim Yeeun
2	Twice	"Fancy"	Crystal Girls	Kawaguchi Yurina	20	Apink	"Mr. Chu"	Eighteen Girls	Lee Hyewon
2	Twice	"Fancy"	Crystal Girls	Kishida Ririka	20	Apink	"Mr. Chu"	Eighteen Girls	Huening Bahiyyih
2	Twice	"Fancy"	Crystal Girls	Kitajima Yuna	20	Apink	"Mr. Chu"	Eighteen Girls	Cho Haeun
2	Twice	"Fancy"	Crystal Girls	Murakami Yume	21	Seulgi, SinB, Chungha, Soyeon	"Wow Thing"	Fireworks	You Dayeon
3	Aespa	"Black Mamba"	Cuties	An Jeongmin	21	Seulgi, SinB, Chungha, Soyeon	"Wow Thing"	Fireworks	Kim Hyerim
3	Aespa	"Black Mamba"	Cuties	Kim Chaehyun	21	Seulgi, SinB, Chungha, Soyeon	"Wow Thing"	Fireworks	Lee Sunwoo
3	Aespa	"Black Mamba"	Cuties	Lee Yunji	21	Seulgi, SinB, Chungha, Soyeon	"Wow Thing"	Fireworks	Kim Doah
4	NCT 127	"Kick It" (영웅)	Hot~Sauce	Yoon Jia	22	Chungha	"Snapping"	China	Su Ruiqi
4	NCT 127	"Kick It" (영웅)	Hot~Sauce	Seo Youngeun	23	Gain	"Paradise Lost"	South Korea	Sim Seungeun
5	(G)I-dle	"Dumdi Dumdi" (덤디덤디)	December Girl	Hiyajo Nagomi	24	Hwasa	"Maria" (마리아)	Dreaming Magic Girl	Gu Yizhou
5	(G)I-dle	"Dumdi Dumdi" (덤디덤디)	December Girl	Sakamoto Mashiro	24	Hwasa	"Maria" (마리아)	Dreaming Magic Girl	Chien Tzuling
6	BoA	"Black"	Japan	Yamauchi Moana	25	Little Mix	"Bounce Back"	Bbo Yoon	Jeong Jiyoon
7	DIA	"Hug U" (감싸줄게요)	Spring Girls	Arai Risako	25	Little Mix	"Bounce Back"	Bbo Yoon	Kim Bora
7	DIA	"Hug U" (감싸줄게요)	Spring Girls	Hayashi Fuko	26	Hyuna	"Bubble Pop!"	South Korea	Choi Yujin
7	DIA	"Hug U" (감싸줄게요)	Spring Girls	Kanno Miyu	27	WJSN	"Boogie Up"	Sparkling Girls	May
7	DIA	"Hug U" (감싸줄게요)	Spring Girls	Nagai Manami	27	WJSN	"Boogie Up"	Sparkling Girls	Fujimoto Ayaka
7	DIA	"Hug U" (감싸줄게요)	Spring Girls	Sakurai Miu	27	WJSN	"Boogie Up"	Sparkling Girls	Inaba Vivienne
8	Oh My Girl	"Nonstop" (살짝 설렜어)	Energy Youngest	Ikema Ruan	27	WJSN	"Boogie Up"	Sparkling Girls	Okuma Sumomo
8	Oh My Girl	"Nonstop" (살짝 설렜어)	Energy Youngest	Kuwahara Ayana	28	I.O.I	"Whatta Man"	Electric Shock	Huh Jiwon
9	BLACKPINK	"Boombayah" (붐바야)	Burn Crush	Ezaki Hikaru	28	I.O.I	"Whatta Man"	Electric Shock	Kim Yubin
9	BLACKPINK	"Boombayah" (붐바야)	Burn Crush	Kamikura Rei	28	I.O.I	"Whatta Man"	Electric Shock	Suh Jimin
9	BLACKPINK	"Boombayah" (붐바야)	Burn Crush	Kamimoto Kotone	28	I.O.I	"Whatta Man"	Electric Shock	Lee Rayeon
9	BLACKPINK	"Boombayah" (붐바야)	Burn Crush	Nonaka Shana	29	(G)I-dle	"Latata"	Witches	Aratake Rinka
10	K/DA	"Pop/Stars"	Shooting~Star	Choi Yeyoung	29	(G)I-dle	"Latata"	Witches	Nakamura Kyara
10	K/DA	"Pop/Stars"	Shooting~Star	Kim Dayeon	29	(G)I-dle	"Latata"	Witches	Shima Moka
10	K/DA	"Pop/Stars"	Shooting~Star	Kim Suyeon	30	Sunmi	"Siren" (사이렌)	China	Xu Ziyin
11	IZ*ONE	"Violeta" (비올레타)	Luxury Proportion Girl	Cui Wenmeixiu	30	Sunmi	"Siren" (사이렌)	China	Xu Ziyin
11	IZ*ONE	"Violeta" (비올레타)	Luxury Proportion Girl	Wang Qiuru	31	Produce 48	"1000%"	Marshmallows	Ito Miyu
11	IZ*ONE	"Violeta" (비올레타)	Luxury Proportion Girl	Xia Yan	31	Produce 48	"1000%"	Marshmallows	Terasaki Hina
11	IZ*ONE	"Violeta" (비올레타)	Luxury Proportion Girl	Yang Zige	31	Produce 48	"1000%"	Marshmallows	Okazaki Momoko
11	IZ*ONE	"Violeta" (비올레타)	Luxury Proportion Girl	Zhang Luofei	32	Twice	"I Can't Stop Me"	Cotton Candy	Lee Yeongyung
11	IZ*ONE	"Violeta" (비올레타)	Luxury Proportion Girl	Zhou Xinyu	32	Twice	"I Can't Stop Me"	Cotton Candy	Joung Min
12	4Minute	"Crazy" (미쳐)	Monster Baby	Guinn Myah	32	Twice	"I Can't Stop Me"	Cotton Candy	Han Dana
12	4Minute	"Crazy" (미쳐)	Monster Baby	Kang Yeseo	32	Twice	"I Can't Stop Me"	Cotton Candy	Ryu Sion
12	4Minute	"Crazy" (미쳐)	Monster Baby	Kim Sein	32	Twice	"I Can't Stop Me"	Cotton Candy	Choi Hyerin
12	4Minute	"Crazy" (미쳐)	Monster Baby	Lee Chaeyun					
13	WJSN-Chocome	"Hmph!" (흥칫뿡)	Twins	Liang Jiao					
13	WJSN-Chocome	"Hmph!" (흥칫뿡)	Twins	Liang Qiao					
14	Itzy	"Wannabe"	Pallet Girls	Leung Cheukying					
14	Itzy	"Wannabe"	Pallet Girls	Li Yiman					
14	Itzy	"Wannabe"	Pallet Girls	Lin Shuyun					
14	Itzy	"Wannabe"	Pallet Girls	Poon Wingchi					
14	Itzy	"Wannabe"	Pallet Girls	Wu Tammy					
15	Girls' Generation-TTS	"Twinkle"	Shining Girl	Liu Shiqi					
15	Girls' Generation-TTS	"Twinkle"	Shining Girl	Ma Yuling					
15	Girls' Generation-TTS	"Twinkle"	Shining Girl	Wang Yale					
16	Oh My Girl	"Dolphin"	S2	Ho Szeching					
16	Oh My Girl	"Dolphin"	S2	Hsu Nientzu					
17	T-ara	"Roly-Poly"	0505 Youngest	Lin Chenhan					
17	T-ara	"Roly-Poly"	0505 Youngest	Liu Yuhan					
18	CLC	"Helicopter"	Strong Girls	Cai Bing					
18	CLC	"Helicopter"	Strong Girls	Chang Ching					
18	CLC	"Helicopter"	Strong Girls	Chiayi					
18	CLC	"Helicopter"	Strong Girls	Fu Yaning					
18	CLC	"Helicopter"	Strong Girls	Wen Zhe					

== Connect Mission (Episodes 2–4) ==
Color key:

- Winning Team
- Leader
- Killing Part

The teams were formed in Episode 2 and the group battle performances were shown in Episodes 3 and 4.

The winning teams had their votes multiplied for the last 24 hours before voting closed on August 28 at 10 AM KST; the winning teams who performed a girl group song received a x2 multiplier while the winning team who performed a boy group song received a x3 multiplier.

Out of the winning teams, "Yes or Yes" Team 1 (Keep Missing You) was chosen to perform at M Countdown. Their performance was aired on September 9, 2021.

Connect Mission
Performance		Team	Contestants		Performance			Team	Points	Contestants	
Original artist(s)	Song	Team	Position	Name	Original artist(s)		Song	Team	Points	Position	Name
Twice	"Yes or Yes"	자꾸 보고싶넹 (Keep Missing You)	Main Vocal	Kim Hyerim	EBS	EXO	"The Eve" (전야)	Red Moon	517	Main Vocal	Jeong Jiyoon
Twice	"Yes or Yes"	자꾸 보고싶넹 (Keep Missing You)	Vocal 1	Kim Chaehyun	EBS	EXO	"The Eve" (전야)	Red Moon	517	Vocal 1	Fu Yaning
Twice	"Yes or Yes"	자꾸 보고싶넹 (Keep Missing You)	Vocal 2	Yamauchi Moana	EBS	EXO	"The Eve" (전야)	Red Moon	517	Vocal 2	Nonaka Shana
Twice	"Yes or Yes"	자꾸 보고싶넹 (Keep Missing You)	Vocal 3	Li Yiman	EBS	EXO	"The Eve" (전야)	Red Moon	517	Vocal 3	Ezaki Hikaru
Twice	"Yes or Yes"	자꾸 보고싶넹 (Keep Missing You)	Vocal 4	Kuwahara Ayana	EBS	EXO	"The Eve" (전야)	Red Moon	517	Vocal 4	You Dayeon
Twice	"Yes or Yes"	자꾸 보고싶넹 (Keep Missing You)	Vocal 5	Huh Jiwon	EBS	EXO	"The Eve" (전야)	Red Moon	517	Vocal 5	Su Ruiqi
Twice	"Yes or Yes"	자꾸 보고싶넹 (Keep Missing You)	Vocal 6	Chiayi	EBS	EXO	"The Eve" (전야)	Red Moon	517	Vocal 6	Kamikura Rei
Twice	"Yes or Yes"	자꾸 보고싶넹 (Keep Missing You)	Vocal 7	Okuma Sumomo	EBS	EXO	"The Eve" (전야)	Red Moon	517	Vocal 7	Kim Suyeon
Twice	"Yes or Yes"	자꾸 보고싶넹 (Keep Missing You)	Vocal 8	Ma Yuling	EBS	EXO	"The Eve" (전야)	Red Moon	517	Vocal 8	Xu Ruowei
Twice	"Yes or Yes"	에너지 바 (Energy Bar!)	Main Vocal	Kim Sein	EBS	BTS	"Mic Drop"	카리스마스크 (Charismask)	453	Main Rapper	Lin Chenhan
Twice	"Yes or Yes"	에너지 바 (Energy Bar!)	Vocal 1	Kishida Ririka	EBS	BTS	"Mic Drop"	카리스마스크 (Charismask)	453	Rapper 1	Wang Yale
Twice	"Yes or Yes"	에너지 바 (Energy Bar!)	Vocal 2	Wen Zhe	EBS	BTS	"Mic Drop"	카리스마스크 (Charismask)	453	Rapper 2	Choi Hyerin
Twice	"Yes or Yes"	에너지 바 (Energy Bar!)	Vocal 3	Xu Ziyin	EBS	BTS	"Mic Drop"	카리스마스크 (Charismask)	453	Rapper 3	Aratake Rinka
Twice	"Yes or Yes"	에너지 바 (Energy Bar!)	Vocal 4	Arai Risako	EBS	BTS	"Mic Drop"	카리스마스크 (Charismask)	453	Vocal 1	An Jeongmin
Twice	"Yes or Yes"	에너지 바 (Energy Bar!)	Vocal 5	Leung Cheukying	EBS	BTS	"Mic Drop"	카리스마스크 (Charismask)	453	Vocal 2	Liu Yuhan
Twice	"Yes or Yes"	에너지 바 (Energy Bar!)	Vocal 6	Okazaki Momoko	EBS	BTS	"Mic Drop"	카리스마스크 (Charismask)	453	Vocal 3	Han Dana
Twice	"Yes or Yes"	에너지 바 (Energy Bar!)	Vocal 7	Lee Chaeyun	EBS	BTS	"Mic Drop"	카리스마스크 (Charismask)	453	Vocal 4	Kitajima Yuna
Twice	"Yes or Yes"	에너지 바 (Energy Bar!)	Vocal 8	Kim Doah	EBS	BTS	"Mic Drop"	카리스마스크 (Charismask)	453	Vocal 5	Fujimoto Ayaka
BLACKPINK	"How You Like That"	플랜 걸스 (Plan Girls)	Main Rapper	Cai Bing	EBS	Seventeen	"Pretty U" (예쁘다)	q-teen	526	Main Vocal	Liu Shiqi
BLACKPINK	"How You Like That"	플랜 걸스 (Plan Girls)	Rapper 1	Xia Yan	EBS	Seventeen	"Pretty U" (예쁘다)	q-teen	526	Vocal 1	Kim Yeeun
BLACKPINK	"How You Like That"	플랜 걸스 (Plan Girls)	Rapper 2	Lee Yeongyung	EBS	Seventeen	"Pretty U" (예쁘다)	q-teen	526	Vocal 2	Yang Zige
BLACKPINK	"How You Like That"	플랜 걸스 (Plan Girls)	Rapper 3	Inaba Vivienne	EBS	Seventeen	"Pretty U" (예쁘다)	q-teen	526	Vocal 3	Murakami Yume
BLACKPINK	"How You Like That"	플랜 걸스 (Plan Girls)	Vocal 1	Seo Youngeun	EBS	Seventeen	"Pretty U" (예쁘다)	q-teen	526	Vocal 4	Lee Yunji (Note: Lee Yunji was originally selected to be the killing part, but was replaced by Guinn Myah at the advice of mentor Sunmi.)
BLACKPINK	"How You Like That"	플랜 걸스 (Plan Girls)	Vocal 2	Choi Yujin	EBS	Seventeen	"Pretty U" (예쁘다)	q-teen	526	Rapper 1	Kamimoto Kotone
BLACKPINK	"How You Like That"	플랜 걸스 (Plan Girls)	Vocal 3	May	EBS	Seventeen	"Pretty U" (예쁘다)	q-teen	526	Rapper 2	Ikema Ruan
BLACKPINK	"How You Like That"	플랜 걸스 (Plan Girls)	Vocal 4	Kawaguchi Yurina	EBS	Seventeen	"Pretty U" (예쁘다)	q-teen	526	Rapper 3	Guinn Myah
BLACKPINK	"How You Like That"	플랜 걸스 (Plan Girls)	Vocal 5	Shen Xiaoting	EBS	Seventeen	"Pretty U" (예쁘다)	q-teen	526	Rapper 4	Gu Yizhou
BLACKPINK	"How You Like That"	히든 카드 (Hidden Card)	Main Rapper	Yoon Jia							
BLACKPINK	"How You Like That"	히든 카드 (Hidden Card)	Rapper 1	Kim Dayeon							
BLACKPINK	"How You Like That"	히든 카드 (Hidden Card)	Rapper 2	Chien Tzuling							
BLACKPINK	"How You Like That"	히든 카드 (Hidden Card)	Rapper 3	Shima Moka							
BLACKPINK	"How You Like That"	히든 카드 (Hidden Card)	Vocal 1	Zhou Xinyu							
BLACKPINK	"How You Like That"	히든 카드 (Hidden Card)	Vocal 2	Sim Seungeun							
BLACKPINK	"How You Like That"	히든 카드 (Hidden Card)	Vocal 3	Sakurai Miu							
BLACKPINK	"How You Like That"	히든 카드 (Hidden Card)	Vocal 4	Wu Tammy							
BLACKPINK	"How You Like That"	히든 카드 (Hidden Card)	Vocal 5	Ando Rinka							
IZ*ONE	"Fiesta"	크라운 (Crown)	Main Vocal	Lee Sunwoo							
IZ*ONE	"Fiesta"	크라운 (Crown)	Vocal 1	Chen Hsinwei							
IZ*ONE	"Fiesta"	크라운 (Crown)	Vocal 2	Sakamoto Mashiro							
IZ*ONE	"Fiesta"	크라운 (Crown)	Vocal 3	Kubo Reina							
IZ*ONE	"Fiesta"	크라운 (Crown)	Vocal 4	Kang Yeseo							
IZ*ONE	"Fiesta"	크라운 (Crown)	Vocal 5	Huang Xingqiao							
IZ*ONE	"Fiesta"	크라운 (Crown)	Vocal 6	Hiyajo Nagomi							
IZ*ONE	"Fiesta"	크라운 (Crown)	Vocal 7	Choi Yeyoung							
IZ*ONE	"Fiesta"	크라운 (Crown)	Vocal 8	Poon Wingchi							
IZ*ONE	"Fiesta"	Butterfly	Main Vocal	Ito Miyu							
IZ*ONE	"Fiesta"	Butterfly	Vocal 1	Kim Yubin							
IZ*ONE	"Fiesta"	Butterfly	Vocal 2	Huening Bahiyyih							
IZ*ONE	"Fiesta"	Butterfly	Vocal 3	Sakamoto Shihona							
IZ*ONE	"Fiesta"	Butterfly	Vocal 4	Suh Jimin							
IZ*ONE	"Fiesta"	Butterfly	Vocal 5	Hsu Nientzu							
IZ*ONE	"Fiesta"	Butterfly	Vocal 6	Wang Qiuru							
IZ*ONE	"Fiesta"	Butterfly	Vocal 7	Nakamura Kyara							
IZ*ONE	"Fiesta"	Butterfly	Vocal 8	Lin Shuyun							
Oh My Girl	"The Fifth Season" (다섯 번째 계절)	우리의 계절 (Our Season)	Main Vocal	Kim Bora							
Oh My Girl	"The Fifth Season" (다섯 번째 계절)	우리의 계절 (Our Season)	Rapper 1	Terasaki Hina							
Oh My Girl	"The Fifth Season" (다섯 번째 계절)	우리의 계절 (Our Season)	Vocal 1	Nagai Manami							
Oh My Girl	"The Fifth Season" (다섯 번째 계절)	우리의 계절 (Our Season)	Vocal 2	Zhang Luofei							
Oh My Girl	"The Fifth Season" (다섯 번째 계절)	우리의 계절 (Our Season)	Vocal 3	Lee Hyewon							
Oh My Girl	"The Fifth Season" (다섯 번째 계절)	우리의 계절 (Our Season)	Vocal 4	Hayase Hana							
Oh My Girl	"The Fifth Season" (다섯 번째 계절)	우리의 계절 (Our Season)	Vocal 5	Ryu Sion							
Oh My Girl	"The Fifth Season" (다섯 번째 계절)	우리의 계절 (Our Season)	Vocal 6	Liang Jiao							
Oh My Girl	"The Fifth Season" (다섯 번째 계절)	우리의 계절 (Our Season)	Vocal 7	Chang Ching							
Oh My Girl	"The Fifth Season" (다섯 번째 계절)	오마이갓 (Oh My God!)	Main Vocal	Lee Rayeon							
Oh My Girl	"The Fifth Season" (다섯 번째 계절)	오마이갓 (Oh My God!)	Rapper 1	Liang Qiao							
Oh My Girl	"The Fifth Season" (다섯 번째 계절)	오마이갓 (Oh My God!)	Vocal 1	Hayashi Fuko							
Oh My Girl	"The Fifth Season" (다섯 번째 계절)	오마이갓 (Oh My God!)	Vocal 2	Cho Haeun							
Oh My Girl	"The Fifth Season" (다섯 번째 계절)	오마이갓 (Oh My God!)	Vocal 3	Cui Wenmeixiu							
Oh My Girl	"The Fifth Season" (다섯 번째 계절)	오마이갓 (Oh My God!)	Vocal 4	Oki Fuka							
Oh My Girl	"The Fifth Season" (다섯 번째 계절)	오마이갓 (Oh My God!)	Vocal 5	Ho Szeching							
Oh My Girl	"The Fifth Season" (다섯 번째 계절)	오마이갓 (Oh My God!)	Vocal 6	Kanno Miyu							
Oh My Girl	"The Fifth Season" (다섯 번째 계절)	오마이갓 (Oh My God!)	Vocal 7	Joung Min							

== Combination Mission (Episodes 6–7) ==
Color key:

- Winning Team
- Leader
- Killing Part
- Leader and Killing Part

The teams were formed in Episode 6. Contestants are grouped into either teams of 3, 6 or 9. The performances were shown in Episodes 6 and 7.

Unlike the Connect Mission, the Combination Mission songs were specific to certain aspects of a performance such as Vocal or Dance.

The contestants in the winning teams each received a point benefit of 270,000 points divided by the number of members in the group.

Combination Mission
Category(s)	Performance			Team	Score (Note: Out of 100; only points of winning teams were revealed.)	Contestants
Category(s)	Order	Original artist(s)	Song	Team	Score	Name
3-Contestant Teams
Rap	1	Woo Won-jae	"We Are" (시차)	새벽 갬성 (Late Night Mood)	–	Kim Bora
Rap	1	Woo Won-jae	"We Are" (시차)	새벽 갬성 (Late Night Mood)	–	Nagai Manami
Rap	1	Woo Won-jae	"We Are" (시차)	새벽 갬성 (Late Night Mood)	–	Wen Zhe
Dance	3	Meghan Trainor	"No Excuses"	Bling Cling Girls	–	Kim Suyeon
Dance	3	Meghan Trainor	"No Excuses"	Bling Cling Girls	–	Ezaki Hikaru
Dance	3	Meghan Trainor	"No Excuses"	Bling Cling Girls	–	Yang Zige
Vocal	5	Taeyeon	"All About You" (그대라는 시)	Girl's Poem	–	Choi Yeyoung
Vocal	5	Taeyeon	"All About You" (그대라는 시)	Girl's Poem	–	Sakurai Miu
Vocal	5	Taeyeon	"All About You" (그대라는 시)	Girl's Poem	–	Huang Xingqiao
Vocal	6	ITZY	"In the Morning" (마.피.아. In the morning)	마지야 (Majiya)	93.83	Huh Jiwon
Vocal	6	ITZY	"In the Morning" (마.피.아. In the morning)	마지야 (Majiya)	93.83	Sakamoto Mashiro
Vocal	6	ITZY	"In the Morning" (마.피.아. In the morning)	마지야 (Majiya)	93.83	Fu Yaning
Rap	7	Show Me the Money 9	"VVS"	V V Yes	–	Lee Chaeyun
Rap	7	Show Me the Money 9	"VVS"	V V Yes	–	Kamimoto Kotone
Rap	7	Show Me the Money 9	"VVS"	V V Yes	–	Liang Jiao
Vocal	9	2PM	"My House" (우리집)	Dream High	–	Seo Youngeun
Vocal	9	2PM	"My House" (우리집)	Dream High	–	Kuwahara Ayana
Vocal	9	2PM	"My House" (우리집)	Dream High	–	Wang Yale
6-Contestant Teams
Vocal + Rap	4	BtoB	"Missing You" (그리워하다)	소리를 그리다 (Drawing Sound)	–	An Jeongmin
Vocal + Rap	4	BtoB	"Missing You" (그리워하다)	소리를 그리다 (Drawing Sound)	–	Kawaguchi Yurina
Vocal + Rap	4	BtoB	"Missing You" (그리워하다)	소리를 그리다 (Drawing Sound)	–	Zhou Xinyu
Vocal + Rap	4	BtoB	"Missing You" (그리워하다)	소리를 그리다 (Drawing Sound)	–	Lee Hyewon
Vocal + Rap	4	BtoB	"Missing You" (그리워하다)	소리를 그리다 (Drawing Sound)	–	Kubo Reina
Vocal + Rap	4	BtoB	"Missing You" (그리워하다)	소리를 그리다 (Drawing Sound)	–	Leung Cheukying
Vocal	8	IU	"My Sea" (아이와 나의 바다)	바다요 (Re-sea-ve)	–	Kim Chaehyun
Vocal	8	IU	"My Sea" (아이와 나의 바다)	바다요 (Re-sea-ve)	–	Nonaka Shana
Vocal	8	IU	"My Sea" (아이와 나의 바다)	바다요 (Re-sea-ve)	–	Xu Ziyin
Vocal	8	IU	"My Sea" (아이와 나의 바다)	바다요 (Re-sea-ve)	–	Jeong Jiyoon
Vocal	8	IU	"My Sea" (아이와 나의 바다)	바다요 (Re-sea-ve)	–	Sakamoto Shihona
Vocal	8	IU	"My Sea" (아이와 나의 바다)	바다요 (Re-sea-ve)	–	Li Yiman
Dance	11	Lee Sun-hee	"Fate" (인연)	선물 (Present)	95	Kang Yeseo
Dance	11	Lee Sun-hee	"Fate" (인연)	선물 (Present)	95	May
Dance	11	Lee Sun-hee	"Fate" (인연)	선물 (Present)	95	Shen Xiaoting
Dance	11	Lee Sun-hee	"Fate" (인연)	선물 (Present)	95	Su Ruiqi
Dance	11	Lee Sun-hee	"Fate" (인연)	선물 (Present)	95	Yamauchi Moana
Dance	11	Lee Sun-hee	"Fate" (인연)	선물 (Present)	95	Choi Yujin
9-Contestant Teams
Dance	2	BLACKPINK, Selena Gomez	"Ice Cream"	엄마는 체리 붕붕 (Cherry Swirl)	– (Note: The "Salute" team won by 0.33 points over "Ice Cream".)	Kim Dayeon
Dance	2	BLACKPINK, Selena Gomez	"Ice Cream"	엄마는 체리 붕붕 (Cherry Swirl)	–	Hsu Nientzu
Dance	2	BLACKPINK, Selena Gomez	"Ice Cream"	엄마는 체리 붕붕 (Cherry Swirl)	–	Ikema Ruan
Dance	2	BLACKPINK, Selena Gomez	"Ice Cream"	엄마는 체리 붕붕 (Cherry Swirl)	–	Guinn Myah
Dance	2	BLACKPINK, Selena Gomez	"Ice Cream"	엄마는 체리 붕붕 (Cherry Swirl)	–	Wu Tammy
Dance	2	BLACKPINK, Selena Gomez	"Ice Cream"	엄마는 체리 붕붕 (Cherry Swirl)	–	Kishida Ririka
Dance	2	BLACKPINK, Selena Gomez	"Ice Cream"	엄마는 체리 붕붕 (Cherry Swirl)	–	Huening Bahiyyih
Dance	2	BLACKPINK, Selena Gomez	"Ice Cream"	엄마는 체리 붕붕 (Cherry Swirl)	–	Chen Hsinwei
Dance	2	BLACKPINK, Selena Gomez	"Ice Cream"	엄마는 체리 붕붕 (Cherry Swirl)	–	Fujimoto Ayaka
Dance	10	Little Mix	"Salute"	look!	–	Cai Bing
Dance	10	Little Mix	"Salute"	look!	–	Zhang Luofei
Dance	10	Little Mix	"Salute"	look!	–	Chiayi
Dance	10	Little Mix	"Salute"	look!	–	Yoon Jia
Dance	10	Little Mix	"Salute"	look!	–	Kim Hyerim
Dance	10	Little Mix	"Salute"	look!	–	Arai Risako
Dance	10	Little Mix	"Salute"	look!	–	Kim Doah
Dance	10	Little Mix	"Salute"	look!	–	Hayase Hana
Dance	10	Little Mix	"Salute"	look!	–	Shima Moka

== Creation Mission (Episodes 9–10) ==
Color key:

- Winning Team
- Leader
- Killing Part

The Creation Mission songs were revealed at the end of Episode 6.

Viewers voted on Universe who they wanted to perform the four songs that were showcased. Voting closed on September 11 at 10:30 PM KST. The winning team had their votes doubled for the last 24 hours of voting until 10 AM KST on October 9.

Creation Mission
Performance			Team	Points	Contestants	
Genre	Song	Production Credit	Team	Points	Position	Name
Synthwave and Synthpop	"Shoot!"	Lyrics & Composition: Jang Hohyun (e.one) & AKB; Choreography: Jang Juhee	팝콘 (POP! CORN)	–	Main Vocal	Choi Yujin
Synthwave and Synthpop	"Shoot!"	Lyrics & Composition: Jang Hohyun (e.one) & AKB; Choreography: Jang Juhee	팝콘 (POP! CORN)	–	Vocal 1	Nagai Manami
Synthwave and Synthpop	"Shoot!"	Lyrics & Composition: Jang Hohyun (e.one) & AKB; Choreography: Jang Juhee	팝콘 (POP! CORN)	–	Vocal 2	Huening Bahiyyih
Synthwave and Synthpop	"Shoot!"	Lyrics & Composition: Jang Hohyun (e.one) & AKB; Choreography: Jang Juhee	팝콘 (POP! CORN)	–	Vocal 3	Guinn Myah
Synthwave and Synthpop	"Shoot!"	Lyrics & Composition: Jang Hohyun (e.one) & AKB; Choreography: Jang Juhee	팝콘 (POP! CORN)	–	Vocal 4	Chen Hsinwei
Synthwave and Synthpop	"Shoot!"	Lyrics & Composition: Jang Hohyun (e.one) & AKB; Choreography: Jang Juhee	팝콘 (POP! CORN)	–	Vocal 5	Kishida Ririka
Synthwave and Synthpop	"Shoot!"	Lyrics & Composition: Jang Hohyun (e.one) & AKB; Choreography: Jang Juhee	팝콘 (POP! CORN)	–	Vocal 6	Ikema Ruan
Pop Dance	"Utopia"	Lyrics & Composition: YOSKE, HZ (ALIVEKNOB), Iver (ALIVEKNOB) & Juno; Choreography: Back Kooyoung	유니콘 (Unicorn)	–	Main Vocal	Kim Bora
Pop Dance	"Utopia"	Lyrics & Composition: YOSKE, HZ (ALIVEKNOB), Iver (ALIVEKNOB) & Juno; Choreography: Back Kooyoung	유니콘 (Unicorn)	–	Vocal 1	Kim Chaehyun
Pop Dance	"Utopia"	Lyrics & Composition: YOSKE, HZ (ALIVEKNOB), Iver (ALIVEKNOB) & Juno; Choreography: Back Kooyoung	유니콘 (Unicorn)	–	Vocal 2	Huang Xingqiao
Pop Dance	"Utopia"	Lyrics & Composition: YOSKE, HZ (ALIVEKNOB), Iver (ALIVEKNOB) & Juno; Choreography: Back Kooyoung	유니콘 (Unicorn)	–	Vocal 3	Kang Yeseo
Pop Dance	"Utopia"	Lyrics & Composition: YOSKE, HZ (ALIVEKNOB), Iver (ALIVEKNOB) & Juno; Choreography: Back Kooyoung	유니콘 (Unicorn)	–	Vocal 4	Kawaguchi Yurina
Electronic Dance	"U+Me=LOVE"	Lyrics & Composition: Alawn, Anna Timgren; Choreography: Back Kooyoung	7 LOVE Minutes	94.17	Main Vocal	Seo Youngeun
Electronic Dance	"U+Me=LOVE"	Lyrics & Composition: Alawn, Anna Timgren; Choreography: Back Kooyoung	7 LOVE Minutes	94.17	Vocal 1	Nonaka Shana
Electronic Dance	"U+Me=LOVE"	Lyrics & Composition: Alawn, Anna Timgren; Choreography: Back Kooyoung	7 LOVE Minutes	94.17	Vocal 2	May
Electronic Dance	"U+Me=LOVE"	Lyrics & Composition: Alawn, Anna Timgren; Choreography: Back Kooyoung	7 LOVE Minutes	94.17	Vocal 3	Kim Suyeon
Electronic Dance	"U+Me=LOVE"	Lyrics & Composition: Alawn, Anna Timgren; Choreography: Back Kooyoung	7 LOVE Minutes	94.17	Vocal 4	Sakamoto Mashiro
Electronic Dance	"U+Me=LOVE"	Lyrics & Composition: Alawn, Anna Timgren; Choreography: Back Kooyoung	7 LOVE Minutes	94.17	Rapper 1	Zhou Xinyu
Electronic Dance	"U+Me=LOVE"	Lyrics & Composition: Alawn, Anna Timgren; Choreography: Back Kooyoung	7 LOVE Minutes	94.17	Rapper 2	Kamimoto Kotone
Moombahton	"Snake" (뱀)	Lyrics & Composition: TENZO & WWWAVE (PAPERMAKER); Choreography: Jang Juhee	메두사 (Medusa)	–	Main Vocal	Fu Yaning
Moombahton	"Snake" (뱀)	Lyrics & Composition: TENZO & WWWAVE (PAPERMAKER); Choreography: Jang Juhee	메두사 (Medusa)	–	Vocal 1	Kim Dayeon
Moombahton	"Snake" (뱀)	Lyrics & Composition: TENZO & WWWAVE (PAPERMAKER); Choreography: Jang Juhee	메두사 (Medusa)	–	Vocal 2	Su Ruiqi (Note: Su Ruiqi was originally selected to be the main vocal but was replaced by Fu Yaning at the advice of the mentors.)
Moombahton	"Snake" (뱀)	Lyrics & Composition: TENZO & WWWAVE (PAPERMAKER); Choreography: Jang Juhee	메두사 (Medusa)	–	Vocal 3	Shen Xiaoting
Moombahton	"Snake" (뱀)	Lyrics & Composition: TENZO & WWWAVE (PAPERMAKER); Choreography: Jang Juhee	메두사 (Medusa)	–	Vocal 4	Wen Zhe
Moombahton	"Snake" (뱀)	Lyrics & Composition: TENZO & WWWAVE (PAPERMAKER); Choreography: Jang Juhee	메두사 (Medusa)	–	Rapper 1	Cai Bing
Moombahton	"Snake" (뱀)	Lyrics & Composition: TENZO & WWWAVE (PAPERMAKER); Choreography: Jang Juhee	메두사 (Medusa)	–	Rapper 2	Ezaki Hikaru

== O.O.O Mission (Episode 11) ==
Color key:

- Leader
- Killing Part

For the O.O.O Mission, the girls were organized into three separate groups, performing the show's theme song, "O.O.O (Over&Over&Over)". The organization of the teams was voted by viewers from September 24 to September 27. The full stage videos of the performances were released on October 9.

Viewers were then supposed to evaluate the contestants' performances by liking the individual stage video of the contestant. The evaluation period ran until 10 AM KST on October 10. Only three winners were selected, one from each team. The winners from a 9-member team gained a benefit 90,000 points while the winner of the 8-member team gained a benefit of 80,000 points.

Bold names denotes the member who got the benefit.

O.O.O Mission
Team	Contestants		Team	Contestants		Team	Contestants	
Team	Position	Name	Team	Position	Name	Team	Position	Name
1	Main Vocal	Kim Dayeon	2	Main Vocal	Nonaka Shana	3	Main Vocal	Kim Bora
1	Vocal 1	Kawaguchi Yurina	2	Vocal 1	Cai Bing	3	Vocal 1	Wen Zhe
1	Vocal 2	Shen Xiaoting	2	Vocal 2	Huang Xingqiao	3	Vocal 2	Chen Hsinwei
1	Vocal 3	**Choi Yujin**	2	Vocal 3	Fu Yaning	3	Vocal 3	Ikema Ruan
1	Vocal 4	Kang Yeseo	2	Vocal 4	Kishida Ririka	3	Vocal 4	Guinn Myah
1	Vocal 5	Sakamoto Mashiro	2	Vocal 5	May	3	Vocal 5	Nagai Manami
1	Vocal 6	Kim Chaehyun	2	Vocal 6	**Huening Bahiyyih**	3	Rapper 1	**Seo Youngeun**
1	Rapper 1	Su Ruiqi	2	Rapper 1	Kamimoto Kotone	3	Rapper 2	Zhou Xinyu
1	Rapper 2	Ezaki Hikaru	2	Rapper 2	Kim Suyeon			

== Completion Mission (Episode 12) ==
Color key:

- Leader
- Ending Part

The Completion Mission was announced at the end of Episode 11. The eighteen remaining contestants formed two teams of nine that performed the same song in the same performance.

The ending part was given to Team 2 based on selection by the mentors.

Completion Mission
Song	Position	Name	
Song	Position	Team 1	Team 2
"Shine" (Note: Team 1 performed the first verse while Team 2 performed the second verse. Both teams performed the chorus.)	Killing Part	Shen Xiaoting	Kim Dayeon
"Shine"	Vocal 1	Choi Yujin	Kim Bora
"Shine"	Vocal 2	Kawaguchi Yurina	Seo Youngeun
"Shine"	Vocal 3	Fu Yaning	Nonaka Shana
"Shine"	Vocal 4	Kang Yeseo	Kim Chaehyun
"Shine"	Vocal 5	Huang Xingqiao	Ezaki Hikaru
"Shine"	Vocal 6	Huening Bahiyyih	Guinn Myah
"Shine"	Vocal 7	Kim Suyeon	Su Ruiqi
"Shine"	Vocal 8	Sakamoto Mashiro	Wen Zhe

== Notes ==
Notes
