= Negotiator (disambiguation) =

A negotiator is a person who engages in negotiation.

Negotiator may also refer to:

- The Negotiator, a 1998 action film starring Samuel L. Jackson and Kevin Spacey
- The Negotiator (novel), an unrelated 1989 crime novel by Frederick Forsyth
- Negotiator (TV series), a 2018 Chinese TV series starring Yang Mi and Huang Zitao
- Negotiator (2003 film), Japanese crime TV film starring Hiroshi Mikami and Mayu Tsuruta
- Negotiator (2014 film), a Spanish film starring Ramón Barea and Josean Bengoetxea
