= Zhang Bin Bin =

张彬彬 may refer to:

- Vin Zhang (born 1993), Chinese actor
- Zhang Binbin (born 1989), Chinese shooter
