= V Love =

- Also known as: First Love; The Micro Era of Love; Micro Times; Microblog Time Love
- Genre: Romance; Drama
- Written by: Chen Baohua
- Directed by: Liu Yizhi
- Creative directors: Jin Xianmei; Yang Mingjie
- Starring: Gao Weiguang; Zhang Binbin; Zhang Yunlong; Dilraba Dilmurat; Xiao Yuyu; Li Xirui; Bian Yu; Yang Chengcheng
- Theme music composer: Ma Jun
- Opening theme: "Our Generation"
- Ending theme: "Her and Him" by Yang Mi; "Has Nothing To Do With Love" by Tan Weiwei; "First Love" by Shawn Yue
- Country of origin: China
- Original language: Mandarin
- No. of seasons: 1
- No. of episodes: 40

Production
- Executive producers: Gao Chen; Zhao Ruoyao
- Producers: Zeng Jia; Yang Mi; Zhang Jing (Co)
- Production locations: Bali; Shanghai
- Cinematography: Zou Dapeng; Yang Xinlai; Tian Yaming
- Editors: Lin Changming; Wan Zheng
- Running time: 45 minutes
- Production companies: H&R Century Pictures; Yueshi Media; Tencent Pictures

Original release
- Network: Tencent
- Release: July 21 – September 11, 2014

V Love (Chinese: 微时代; pinyin: Wēi Shí Dài; Korean: 미시대; RR: Mi Si Dae), formerly known as Love In The Micro Era·First Love (Chinese: 微时代之恋·初恋篇) is a 2014 Chinese television series directed by Liu Yuzhi and written by Chen Baohua, starring Gao Weiguang, Zhang Binbin, Zhang Yunlong, Dilraba Dilmurat, Xiao Yuyu, Li Xirui, Bian Yu, and Yang Chengcheng. It exclusively aired in Tencent Video as a web drama on 21 July 2014 until 11 September 2014 every Mondays-Fridays at 12:00.

== Plot ==
A story about revolving around eight youths of the post 90s-generation (SNS generation) who come from different family backgrounds and experienced a complex relationship at the Bohan University. They are about to graduate while enjoying their life in the Internet age and facing challenges to finding happiness as they finish university and move on into their own world in the luxurious city of China, Shanghai.

== Cast ==
=== Main ===
- Vengo Gao as Ying Dong / Kaiser
  - Heir of a large luxury goods conglomerate who holds a supreme status in the Bohan University. He firstly dates his first love, Luo Yi during their college day before later broke up after the graduation. He becomes close with Wan Jia, but later with Anpo due to Wan Jia's identity disparity and his father's opposition.
- Vin Zhang as Han Dingyi
  - Boss of a flower shop invested by Ying Dong who firstly likes Wan Jia, but later found out that he falls in love with Weiwei after an incident.
- Leon Zhang as Hua Youxi
  - Dingyi's half brother and Mei Bao's boyfriend who truly loves her after the false pregnancy incident.
- Dilraba Dilmurat as Wu Anpo / Amber
  - The most popular girl on Bohan University since she's the only daughter of Shanghai Hotel chain tycoon. She firstly likes Zirui, but later breaks up after realizing that she loves Yingdong and dates him.
- Rainie Chen as Wan Jia, an arts student and Ying Dong's ex-girlfriend.
- Sierra Li as Kang Weiwei (a.k.a. Mister Kang)
  - Wan Jia's bestfriend who is known for her straightforward and tough personality. She likes Dingyi to be with her but eventually breaks up because of Wan Jia.
- Bian Yu as Kang Zirui
  - A director and Weiwei's older brother who likes and pursues Luo Yi at first before later dates Anpo. They eventually broke up due to misunderstanding between them.
- Orange Yang as Mei Bao
  - Captain of the cheerleader team who becomes a part-time worker at a bar. She later falls in love with Youxi and hopes to be his girlfriend after the false pregnancy incident.

=== Supporting ===
- Sitar Tan as Ai Di / Eddie, an "Ugly Duckling" who transform into an established singer and become Dingyi's first love.
- Bibi Zhou as Ye Feifei, an entertainment news reporter and the "Gossip Queen".
- Monica Chan as Gao Qi, Anpo's mother.
- Kim Bum as Ou Hui.
  - Owner of Auva Group who is also a wealthy yet arrogant restaurateur. Despite his strong and confident personality, he rarely gets along with everyone due to his perfectionist tendencies before later meets Weiwei and falls for her.
- Lawrence Wang as Teacher Lan, a teacher at Bohan University.
- Zhang Zixuan as Ding Xiaorou / Sunnie, Sanmao's first love.
- Hou Guanqun as Wu Yuting, Anpo's father and a chain of Shanghai Hotel Tycoon.
- Yu Li as Hua Mengjun, Youxi and Dingyi's mother.
- Zheng Xiaoning as Wan Fu, Wan Jia's father.
- Yuan Jia as Wei Chi, Yuting's secretary.
- Wang Xiao as Lan Tian, a teacher and Mengjun's good friend.
- Xu Fangyi as Ou Yangqiao, a girl who likes Wei Chi.
- Yao Lu as Ying Youjin, Ying Dong's father.
- Wang Zhifei as Han Xuewei
- Yuan Jie as Wei Te

=== Special appearances ===
- Yang Mi as Luo Yi, a huge superstar and Ying Dong's first love (Ep. 1–2, 38–40)
- Shawn Yue as Hua Sanmao, a Teppanyaki chef who is known for his good looks and is Youxi and Dingyi's uncle (Ep. 1–9)

== Production ==
- This is South Korean actor Kim Bum's first Chinese drama.
- Beside playing the role as "Luo Yi", actress Yang Mi also become the producer which later established "V Studio" by herself to specially responsible for the costume styling.
- This series started filming in Bali, Indonesia on 21 February 2013 and took the palace at Shanghai, China in early March until 27 May in the same year.

== Original soundtrack ==
Title	Lyrics	Composer	Singer	Note
Her and Him (她他)	Jiang Shengnan; Tan Xuan	Tan Xuan	Yang Mi	
Ribcage (肋骨)	Xiao Han	Ding Shiguang	Bibi Zhou	
First Love (第一次爱情)	Tan Xuan	Tan Xuan	Shawn Yue	
Nothing To Do With Love (与爱情无关)	Tan Xuan	Tan Xuan	Sitar Tan	
Heavenly Stairs (天梯)	Gou Qing	Tan Xuan	Vin Zhang; Sierra Li	
Our Generation (我们的时代)	Tan Xuan	Tan Xuan	Various artist	Opening Theme
Colorful Youth (青春不留白)	Tan Xuan; Dai Yuedong	Zeng Di	Leon Zhang	
If There Was An Afterlife (如果有来生)	Gao Xiaosong	Ge Fei	Sitar Tan	
Tan Moumou (谭某某)	Tan Wei; Gao Xiaosong	Lü Xingtuan	Sitar Tan	
Past Times (往日时光)	Ke Ming	Wulan Tuoga	Sitar Tan	

== Broadcast ==
Channel	Country	Airing Date	Showing Time
Tencent Video	China	July 21, 2014	—N/a
GEM TV ASIA	Vietnam	September 22, 2014	every Mondays to Fridays at 19:00–20:00
J2	Hong Kong	January 21, 2016	every Mondays to Fridays at 19:00–20:00
Top TV	Taiwan	September 13, 2017	every Mondays to Fridays at 17:00–18:00
StarHub TV	Singapore	October 13, 2017	every Mondays to Fridays at 19:00–20:00
NTV7	Malaysia	2018	every Mondays to Fridays at 13:30–14:30

== Others ==
Many sources pointed out that this series is a Chinese version of the 2007-12 American series Gossip Girl.
