= Chronicle of Life =

- Genre: Historical fiction Melodrama; Romance
- Based on: Lonely Courtyard in Late Spring by Fei Wo Si Cun
- Written by: Jiang Guangyu; Rao Hou
- Directed by: Wu Jinyuan
- Starring: Hawick Lau; Zheng Shuang; Vin Zhang
- Opening theme: No End by Hawick Lau
- Ending theme: When We First Meet, Love Already Ends by Xiang Xiang
- Country of origin: China
- Original language: Mandarin
- No. of episodes: 40

Production
- Producer: Yu Zheng
- Production location: Hengdian World Studios
- Running time: 45 minutes
- Production companies: Linmon Pictures; Dream Stardom Film and TV Culture Co., Ltd

Original release
- Network: Zhejiang Television; Shenzhen Television
- Release: 1 February – 23 February 2016

Chronicle of Life (Chinese: 寂寞空庭春欲晚) is a 2016 Chinese television series starring Hawick Lau, Zheng Shuang and Vin Zhang. It is based on the Chinese novel Lonely Courtyard in Late Spring by Fei Wo Si Cun. The series aired on Zhejiang Television and Shenzhen Television from 1 February to 23 February 2016.

== Synopsis ==
This story is about the Kangxi Emperor and Consort Liang from the Wei clan, the mother of Yunsi.

When Kangxi (Hawick Lau) was sixteen, he eliminated the traitor, Oboi, and his allies. A misunderstanding causes a loyal officer and Chahar Mongol prince, Wei Abunai, to be treated as a fellow rebel, causing his entire family to be sentenced to death. Ten-year-old Liang'er (Zheng Shuang) had to witness the death of her parents and brother. As she was escaping, she met the young Kangxi, who was being pursued by his enemies. Without knowledge of each other's backgrounds, Liang'er and Kangxi undergo life and death. Having left a deep impression on each other, they made a promise to meet again. However, Liang'er loses her memory through an accident. In order to protect Liang'er, her cousin Nalan Rongruo (Vin Zhang) changed her name to Wei Linlang, and took her into his care. The two grew up together and developed a special bond. However, Rongruo's father, Nalan Mingju, fearing that Linlang's identity would cause trouble for the family, secretly sent her to the palace to become a maid in order to prevent the two from being together.

Linlang thought she would end up dying a lonely death in the palace, but the appearance of Kangxi disrupted her life. Her reunion with Rongruo also gave her another ray of hope. Kangxi recognized Linlang as the young girl who saved his life as a child, and resorted to various methods to help her remember the past. Meanwhile, Rongruo plans to take Linlang and escape from the palace. Stuck between an overbearing emperor and her childhood lover, Linlang is at a loss.

It was only after Kangxi fell deeply in love with Linlang that he learned she was actually the cousin Rongruo was in love with all along. He decides to let the two lovers be reunited, but a twist of fate causes deeper misunderstandings and missed chances. After going through a series of tribulations, Linlang realizes that she has fallen in love with Kangxi. However, at this moment, she recovers her memory and realizes Kangxi was responsible for her family's death. Linlang's brother, Changqing, who has been ambushed to the palace as a eunuch, also shows up and reveals his identity to Linlang and pressurizes her to seek revenge for their family. Linlang and Kangxi thus become entangled in a sorrowful and heart-wrenching love.

== Cast ==
- Hawick Lau as Kangxi Emperor
- Zheng Shuang as Wei Linlang
- Vin Zhang as Nalan Rongruo
- Michelle Yim as Empress Dowager Xiaozhuang
- Zhang Xiaochen as Changqing, Linlang's brother
- Wong Yeuk-sam as Consort Hui, Rongruo's sister
- Zhang Zhixi as Huazhu
- Cheng Yanqiu as Cuijun
- Liu Mengmeng as Yushu
- Liu Tianru as Yunchu
- Zheng Long as Xiaodezi
- Yang Mingna as Empress Xiaohuizhang
- Siqin Gaoli as Fangjing
- Cao Yan as Duanpin
- Norman Chui (Xu Shaoqing) as Oboi

== Soundtrack ==
No.	Title	Singer	Length
1.	"No End (無終)" (Opening theme song)	Hawick Lau
2.	"When We First Meet, Love Already Ends (初見愛已晚)" (Ending theme song)	Xiang Xiang
3.	"Falling Pear Flowers (梨花落)" (Insert song)	Henry Huo
4.	"Treasuring Beauty (惜春詞)" (Insert song)	Henry Huo

== Ratings ==
Air date	Zhejiang TV CSM52 City Ratings				Shenzhen TV CSM52 City Ratings			
Air date	Episode	Ratings (%)	Audience share (%)	Rank	Episode	Ratings (%)	Audience share (%)	Rank
2016.02.01	1-2	1.271	3.29	2	1-2	0.594	1.54	11
2016.02.02	3-4	1.081	2.86	4	3-4	0.561	1.49	10
2016.02.03	5-6	1.167	3.07	3	5-6	0.656	1.73	10
2016.02.04	7-8	1.049	2.81	4	7-8	0.691	1.85	7
2016.02.05	9	1.112	3.122	1	9-10	0.463	1.251	7
2016.02.06	10	1.178	3.219	1	11-12	0.709	1.886	7
2016.02.08	11-12	1.006	2.858	1	13-14	0.599	1.078	6
2016.02.09	13-14	0.969	3.016	1	15-16	0.471	1.475	9
2016.02.10	15-16	1.057	3.248	1	17-18	0.523	1.611	7
2016.02.11	17-18	1.175	3.525	1	19-20	0.612	1.84	6
2016.02.12	19	1.2	3.556	1	21-22	0.4	1.146	10
2016.02.13	20	1.080	2.907	1	23-24	0.635	1.678	10
2016.02.14	21-22	1.304	3.392	1	25-26	0.658	1.711	10
2016.02.15	23-24	1.290	3.338	1	27-28	0.632	1.636	10
2016.02.16	25-26	1.332	3.48	1	29-30	0.663	1.734	8
2016.02.17	27-28	1.268	3.262	1	31-32	0.664	1.71	9
2016.02.18	29-30	1.323	3.444	1	33-34	0.644	1.679	8
2016.02.19	31	1.189	3.133	1	35-36	0.81	2.07	6
2016.02.20	32-33	1.216	3.19	1	36-37	0.892	2.35	3
2016.02.21	34-35	1.255	3.2	1	38-39	0.876	2.23	7
2016.02.22	36	1.052	2.646	3	40-41	0.884	2.232	7
2016.02.23	37	1.125	2.94	3	42-43	0.607	1.6	9
Average ratings	1-37	1.168	3.16	/	1-43	0.647	1.706	/

- Highest ratings are marked in red, lowest ratings are marked in blue

== International broadcast ==
Region	Network	Dates	Notes
(Vietnam)	VTV5	18 May - 7 June 2020 (Weekdays 19:00, two episodes per day)	Original with Vietnamese commentary.; No episodes was aired on 6 June 2020 due to a football match live between CLB Than Quảng Ninh and CLB Hồng Lĩnh Hà Tĩnh.
(Vietnam)	VTV5 Tây Nam Bộ	17 August - 8 September 2020 (Weekdays 19:00, two episodes per day)	Dubbed with Vietnamese (Southern accent)
(Vietnam)	TN1 (Thái Nguyên Radio - Television Station)	April - May 2020 (Weekdays 17:15)	Original with Vietnamese commentary
(Vietnam)	NTV (Nghệ An Radio - Television Station)	22 August 2020 – present (Weekdays 20:20, aired again next day at 07:15)	Original with Vietnamese commentary
