= Li Xirui =

Chinese actress and singer

- Born: 30 January 1990 (age 36); Beijing, China
- Other names: Sierra Li (formerly Nikki Li), Sierra Lee
- Education: Minzu University of China
- Occupations: Actress; Singer
- Years active: 2011–present

Li Xirui (Chinese: 李溪芮; born 30 January 1990) is a Chinese actress and singer.

== Career ==
Li made her acting debut in the romance comedy series Waking Love Up in 2011. She then played one of the lead roles in the romance web drama V Love produced by Jiaxing Media, and played significant supporting roles in the family drama The Wife's Secret and period romance drama Legend of Fragrance. Li rose to fame for her role as Wu Jiayi in the hit modern drama The Interpreter, and subsequently gained increased recognition for her role as Xia Qiao in the romance comedy drama Pretty Li Huizhen.

Li played her first lead role in the romance comedy web drama Pretty Man in 2018. The same year, she played lead roles in the romance melodrama To Love To Heal, and suspense drama Dongshan Fine After Queen Consort the Snow.

== Filmography ==
=== Film ===
Year	English title	Chinese title	Role	Notes
2015	The Witness	我是证人		

=== Television series ===
Year	English title	Chinese title	Role	Notes
2011	Waking Love Up	爱情睡醒了	Da'na	
2014	The Wife's Secret	妻子的秘密	Huang Rong	
2014	V Love	微时代	Kang Weiwei	
2014	Youth Without Limit	青春无极限	Liu Yinqi	
2015	Legend of Fragrance	活色生香	Ding Peishan	
2015	You Are My Sisters	你是我的姐妹	Yang Jia	
2015	Legend of the Concubinage	纳妾记	Qin Zhiruo	
2015	Hummingbird	蜂鸟	Gu Manting	
2016	The Interpreter	亲爱的翻译官	Wu Jiayi	
2016	Legend of Ace	极品家丁	Xiao Qingxuan	
2017	Pretty Li Huizhen	漂亮的李慧珍	Xia Qiao	
2018	Pretty Man	国民老公	Qiao Anhao	
2018	To Love To Heal	我站在桥上看风景	Xiao Shuiguang	
2018	Dongshan Fine After Queen Consort the Snow	东山晴后雪	Zhao Xiaoqing	
2021	My Fated Boy	我的邻居长不大	Lin Yang	
TBA	Chinese Peacekeeping Force	蓝盔特战队	Xiang Zhen	
TBA	Sniper	瞄准	Qin Zishu	

== Discography ==
=== Album ===
Year	English title	Chinese title	Notes
2011	Light and Heat	光热	

=== Singles ===
Year	English title	Chinese title	Album	Notes
2011	"The World's Most Beautiful Flower"	世间最美丽的花	Tracking Knights Phantom OST	
2011	"A Misunderstanding"	一场误会	The Seven Heroes and Five Gallants OST	
2015	"The Past Events in My Heart"	心中的过往	Hummingbird OST	
2016	"You Are My Most Beloved Baby"	你就是我最爱的宝宝	Legend of Ace OST	
2017	"To Love Completely"	愛得起	Pretty Li Huizhen OST	with Vin Zhang
2018	"Not a Rash Act"	不是冲动	Pretty Man OST	with Xiong Ziqi

== Awards and nominations ==
Year	Award	Category	Nominated work	Results	Ref.
2016	Fashion Power Award	New Artist Award	—N/a	Won	
2018	10th China TV Drama Awards	Media Recommended Actor	—N/a	Won	
