= Pretty Li Huizhen =

2017 Chinese television series

- Poster promotion
- Genre: Romantic comedy
- Written by: Lu Zhirou; Yang Qing
- Directed by: Zhao Chenyang
- Starring: Dilraba Dilmurat; Peter Sheng; Vin Zhang; Li Xirui
- Opening theme: Be Together Without Worries by Dilraba Dilmurat
- Ending theme: Hello Cinderella by Hu Xia
- Composer: Dong Dongdong
- Country of origin: China
- Original language: Mandarin
- No. of seasons: 1
- No. of episodes: 40 / 46 (TV)

Production
- Producers: Gao Chen; Zhang Yong; Gao Fei
- Running time: 45 minutes per episode
- Production companies: Jay Walk Studio; Mango Studios; LeTV

Original release
- Network: Hunan Television
- Release: 2 January – 2 February 2017

Related
- She Was Pretty

Pretty Li Huizhen (Chinese: 漂亮的李慧珍; pinyin: Piāo liàng de lǐ huì zhēn) is a 2017 Chinese television series starring Dilraba Dilmurat, Peter Sheng, Vin Zhang, and Li Xirui. The series was based on the Korean drama She Was Pretty. It was first aired on Hunan TV from 2 January to 2 February 2017, and was a commercial success, ranking first in its time slot and accumulating over 7 billion views online.

== Synopsis ==
In her youth, Li Huizhen (Dilraba Dilmurat) was a stunning beauty. However, the stress of her family's financial decline and long work days have taken a toll on her appearance, and she now goes through life looking disheveled and forgettable. On the contrary, her childhood friend and admirer Bai Haoyu (Sheng Yilun), once short and overweight, has grown into not only a handsome man, but a successful one. When Haoyu reconnects with Huizhen after the two not having spoken in over a decade, Haoyu doesn't recognize Huizhen, and mistakes her best friend, the fashionable and charming Xia Qiao (Li Xirui) for her. Too embarrassed of her own appearance to correct him, Huizhen asks Qiao to keep pretending to be her in front of Haoyu.

Huizhen when she is offered a three-month internship at a fashion magazine, Immortal, but to her disappointment, she is assigned to corporate support and will have nothing to do with the fashion designers, photographers, or models. To her excitement, she is allowed to leave corporate support and work alongside the magazine's editorial staff, but the change comes with a drawback and that is that her new boss in Haoyu. Haoyu, still not knowing who she is, treats her like any other intern and is critical of her work ethic and appearance, but her new colleague, Lin Yimu (Vin Zhang), becomes enamored with her. Further complicating the situation is that Qiao has begun to fall in love with Haoyu. The complicated nature of working with Haoyu initially has Huizhen trying to go back to corporate support, but she ultimately decides to stay with the editorial staff, and works on bettering herself, earning her colleagues' respect.

As Huizhen's appearance and skills improve, Haoyu becomes more cordial towards her, and finally asks her for her name, still not realizing that his coworker Huizhen is the same Huizhen he had a crush on in his younger days. Time progresses, and Haoyu begins to make connections between the two figures, and as he begins to doubt that the Huizhen he first met weeks ago, who is actually Qiao, is the real Huizhen. Haoyu begins to develop feelings for the real Huizhen and Qiao, who is now in love with Haoyu, fears losing him if she reveals her true identity, so in an act of betrayal, she convinces him that she is the real Huizhen. Despite believing Qiao, Haoyu's feelings for the real Huizhen grow stronger, and the belief that Qiao is the real Huizhen isn't enough to halt the budding attraction. In the background, Limu also competes for Huizhen's affection.

Huizhen's dramatic love quadrangle gradually comes to an end when she realizes she loves Haoyu and he realizes he loves her. Limu, though saddened by Huizhen's rejection, is content with being her friend, and also befriends Qiao. Ultimately, Huizhen and Haoyu decide to get married.

== Cast ==
=== Main ===
- Dilraba Dilmurat as Li Huizhen (a.k.a. "Charlie" [查理], "Baozhatou" [爆炸头])
  - Qu Zhihan as young Li Huizhen

A kind and caring young woman who the crew relies on for hard work. She cares deeply for Haoyu even through all the times that he's wronged her. Huizhen is best friends with Xia Qiao and considers her as her sister. Although she cares for Yimu as a friend, she doesn't reciprocate his feelings.

- Sheng Yilun as Bai Haoyu (a.k.a. "Fatty Yu" [白胖宇], "Deputy Editor-in-Chief Bai" [白副主编] or "Lao Bai" [老白])
  - Zhou Baizhen as young Bai Haoyu

A strict and demanding man who treats his staffs horribly. Although Li Huizhen's clumsiness and klutz-like nature annoyed him at first, he slowly began to soften up to her and his staffs. He somewhat views Yimu as a rival, often feeling jealous when Huizhen's around him.

- Zhang Binbin as Lin Yimu (a.k.a. "Diviner" [占卜者], "Aiden James")

An unruly man and jokester who's well respected member of the staff. He loves food and always asks Li Huizhen over to eat. Even though he is a prankster, he is very emotional, choosing to hide his feelings from most people. He has a special bond with Xia Qiao, bonding with her over the fact that the person they love doesn't love them back. He is in love and holds affection to Li Huizhen and is very protective of her. He doesn't like Haoyu, viewing him as undeserving of Huizhen.

- Li Xirui as Xia Qiao
  - Zhu Nihua as young Xia Qiao

A fashionable young woman who works at a hotel. She houses with Li Huizhen and considers her as her best friend. Xia Qiao didn't expect herself to fall in love with Haoyu, but still does. She and Yimu often get together and talk about their loved ones.

=== Supporting ===
==== People at Immortal Magazine ====
- Ren Wei as Vivian
  - The Editor-in-chief who is very high fashionable woman.
- Wang Xiao as Lin Hao
  - The Column editor, a carefree and laid-back worker who is known for his eccentricities and later revealed to be the chairman's son.
- Wang Yinan as Zhu Ying
  - The Fashion editor and a highly respected worker who has been at Immortal for thirteen years.
- Song Wenzuo as Lin Husheng
  - A kind worker and the help mode team who has a crush on Han Xue and later become her boyfriend.
- Zhao Zihui as Ya Ling, the Beauty team
- Wang Yifei as Han Xue
  - The assistant of the beauty team and a selfish worker who is looking for a rich man to marry, even already become Lin Husheng's girlfriend.
- Hao Shuang as Lu Lu, the make-up assistant
- Yang Yanru as Mei Li
  - A worker and the mode team at Immortal who is known for her obsession with Diviner, an anonymous author.
- You You as Anna, the public relations team

==== People around Li Huizhen ====
- Wang Zaihe as Huizhen's father
- Su Xin as Huizhen's mother
- Miao Zhongzhen as Li Huilin, Huizhen's little sister

==== People around Bai Haoyu ====
- Li Dongheng as Eric, Haoyu's best friend who is Diviner’s manager.

==== People around Xia Qiao ====
- Gu Kaili as Xia Huijing, Xia Qiao's birth mother
- Cai Gang as Xia Qiao's father
- Zhang Pingjuan as Luo Minli, Xia Qiao's stepmother

==== Others ====
- Wang Chu as Department Chief
- Zhang Jiayi as Gi Gi
- Li Yunao as Pang Nansheng (the fat guy, eps. 1)
- Yu Qing as Mike
- Im Ho as Wang Xiao
- Chen Saisai as Chen Fei
- Gan Liying as Sis Yang
- Mi Ya as Wang Shina
- Wang Jiali as Han Ha
- Li Dong as Bao Zi
- Tian Rui as Teacher Zhang
- Wu Qian as Clothing Store manager
- Zhu Zicong
- Long De as a countryside restaurant owner
- Ge Xiaosong as President Ge of GIO
- Bu Yaping as Store manager Xiao Li

== Soundtrack ==
| No. | Title | Singer | Length |
|---|---|---|---|
| 1. | "Be Together Without Worries (漂亮的在一起)" (Opening theme song) | Dilraba Dilmurat |
| 2. | "Hello Cinderella (你好灰姑娘)" (Ending theme song) | Hu Xia |
| 3. | "Can't Bear To (舍不得)" | Dilraba Dilmurat |
| 4. | "Able to Love (爱得起)" | Vin Zhang & Li Xirui |

== Reception ==
=== Premiere ratings ===
- Highest ratings are marked in red, lowest ratings are marked in blue

| Air date | Episode | CSM52 city network ratings | | | National Internet ratings | | |
| Air date | Episode | Ratings (%) | Audience share (%) | Rank | Ratings (%) | Audience share (%) | Rank |
|---|---|---|---|---|---|---|---|
| January 2, 2017 | 1-2 | 0.451 | 2.744 | 2 | 0.59 | 4.70 | 1 |
| January 3, 2017 | 3-4 | 0.411 | 2.526 | 2 | 0.54 | 4.32 | 1 |
| January 4, 2017 | 5-6 | 0.502 | 3.149 | 1 | 0.61 | 4.77 | 1 |
| January 5, 2017 | 7-8 | 0.557 | 3.323 | 1 | 0.77 | 5.78 | 1 |
| January 8, 2017 | 9-10 | 0.627 | 3.573 | 1 | 0.81 | 5.81 | 1 |
| January 9, 2017 | 11-12 | 0.679 | 4.020 | 1 | 0.99 | 7.31 | 1 |
| January 10, 2017 | 13-14 | 0.751 | 4.472 | 1 | 1.05 | 7.76 | 1 |
| January 11, 2017 | 15-16 | 0.842 | 5.141 | 1 | 1.09 | 8.09 | 1 |
| January 12, 2017 | 17-18 | 0.949 | 5.819 | 1 | 1.24 | 8.93 | 1 |
| January 15, 2017 | 19-20 | 1.002 | 5.454 | 1 | 1.17 | 7.76 | 1 |
| January 16, 2017 | 21-22 | 1.176 | 7.134 | 1 | 1.44 | 10.39 | 1 |
| January 17, 2017 | 23-24 | 1.186 | 7.066 | 1 | 1.58 | 11.10 | 1 |
| January 18, 2017 | 25-26 | 1.349 | 7.951 | 1 | 1.92 | 12.87 | 1 |
| January 19, 2017 | 27-28 | 1.352 | 7.950 | 1 | 1.78 | 11.91 | 1 |
| January 22, 2017 | 29-30 | 1.386 | 6.954 | 1 | 1.84 | 10.42 | 1 |
| January 23, 2017 | 31-32 | 1.396 | 7.562 | 1 | 2.04 | 12.03 | 1 |
| January 24, 2017 | 33-34 | 1.342 | 7.026 | 1 | 1.89 | 11.13 | 1 |
| January 25, 2017 | 35-36 | 1.285 | 6.388 | 1 | 1.73 | 9.51 | 1 |
| January 26, 2017 | 37-38 | 1.304 | 5.796 | 1 | 1.53 | 9.28 | 1 |
| January 29, 2017 | 39-40 | 1.197 | 6.240 | 1 | 1.41 | 8.12 | 1 |
| January 31, 2017 | 41-42 | 0.965 | 5.144 | 1 | 1.63 | 9.67 | 1 |
| February 1, 2017 | 43-44 | 1.003 | 5.120 | 1 | 1.46 | 8.62 | 1 |
| February 2, 2017 | 45-46 | 1.112 | 6.106 | 1 | 1.27 | 7.98 | 1 |
| Average ratings | | 0.982 | 5.51 | - | 1.34 | 8.64 | - |

=== Awards and nominations ===
| Year | Award | Category | Nominated work | Result | Ref. |
|---|---|---|---|---|---|
| 2018 | 29th China TV Golden Eagle Award | Outstanding Television Series | Pretty Li Huizhen | Won | |
| 2018 | 29th China TV Golden Eagle Award | Best Actress | Dilraba Dilmurat | Won | |
| 2018 | 12th China Golden Eagle TV Art Festival | Most Popular Actress | Dilraba Dilmurat | Won | |

== International broadcast ==
| Network(s)/Station(s) | Series premiere | Airing dates | Title |
|---|---|---|---|
| China | Hunan Television | January 2, 2017 – February 2, 2017 (Every Sunday to Thursday night 22:00-23:40) | 漂亮的李慧珍 (Pretty Li Huizhen; lit: ) |
| China | Shenzhen TV | June 19, 2017 - (19:30-21:15 every night) | 漂亮的李慧珍 (Pretty Li Huizhen; lit: ) |
| China | ZTV3 | November 22, 2017 - (18:30-20:20 every night) | 漂亮的李慧珍 (Pretty Li Huizhen; lit: ) |
| China | Southeast Television | June 26, 2018 – (19:30-21:15 every night) | 漂亮的李慧珍 (Pretty Li Huizhen; lit: ) |
| Malaysia | dimsum | January 19, 2017 - () | 漂亮的李慧珍 (Pretty Li Huizhen; lit: ) |
| Malaysia | NTV7 | May 11, 2017 - (Monday to Thursday 9:30-10:30 pm) | 漂亮的李慧珍 (Pretty Li Huizhen; lit: ) |
| Hong Kong | myTV SUPER, Chinese Drama | July 9, 2017 – September 16, 2017 (Saturday and Sunday 11:00-13:00) | 漂亮的李慧珍 (Pretty Li Huizhen; lit: ) |
| Hong Kong | TVB, TVB J2 | November 20, 2017 – January 25, 2018 (Monday to Friday 19:00-20:00) | 漂亮的李慧珍 (Pretty Li Huizhen; lit: ) |
| Thailand | Website:MONOMAX | March 13, 2020 - April 21, 2020 () | ขอหยุดหัวใจที่ยัยจอมยุ่ง (Pretty Li Huizhen; lit: ) |
| Thailand | 9 MCOT HD (30) | March 20, 2020 - August 6, 2020 February (Every Thursday and Friday from 23.05 - 00.00) | เทหัวใจให้ยัยจอมวุ่น (Pretty Li Huizhen; lit: ) |
