= The Witness (2015 Chinese film) =

- Theatrical release poster
- Chinese: 我是证人
- Directed by: Ahn Sang-hoon
- Starring: Yang Mi; Lu Han; Wang Jingchun; Zhu Yawen
- Production companies: Xinxiansuo (Beijing) Entertainment Capital; Jaywalk Media; Han Guo Wang Ru Ren; Moonwatcher
- Distributed by: Beijing Enlight Pictures
- Release date: October 30, 2015 (China)
- Running time: 112 minutes
- Countries: China; South Korea
- Language: Mandarin
- Box office: US$34 million

The Witness (Chinese: 我是证人) is a 2015 crime thriller film directed by Ahn Sang-hoon, starring Yang Mi and Lu Han. The film is a remake of the 2011 South Korean film Blind, also by the same director. It was released in China on October 30, 2015.

== Plot ==
Lu Xiaoxing is a rookie cop when one night, she abandons her post to find her brother, an aspiring singer and bring him back home after his constant rebellion. As they fight in the car, Xiaoxing loses control of the vehicle and crashes into a truck, killing her brother and leaving her blind.

Three years later, Xiaoxing is living life as a blind woman. Amidst a string of female disappearances in the city, she tries unsuccessfully to persuade her former police academy senior to allow her another chance at being an officer. Upset and unable to come to terms with the rejection and her brother's death, Xiaoxing calls a taxi to head home.

After waiting for a while, a luxurious car pulls up and asks her if she needs a taxi. Upon getting in, she immediately realizes strange things about the car and her driver offers her a coffee. As they fight over opening the coffee, they crash into a woman. In the middle of chaos, Xiaoxing is left in the rain as he drives off.

At the police station, she reports her experience to the head of police, Captain Lu and with her police training, is able to deduce key details of the incident despite being blind. After a hefty reward is posted for any eyewitnesses, it attracts the attention of reckless, music-loving teenager Linchong. Xiaoxing and Captain Lu both dismiss his account.

One night, when Linchong rollerblades home after Xiaoxing and Captain Lu claim that they will be late, he is tailed by Tang Zhen on a motorcycle. After temporarily escaping, he is knocked over by Tang Zhen's car and admitted to the hospital, and was lucky to be alive with no severe damage to his skull and brain. However, a few days later, Linchong sees a man tailing Xiaoxing as she boards a bus. Sensing danger, Linchong calls Xiaoxing and asks her to turn on her video camera to film her surroundings so he can guide her to safety. Her pursuer notices and gives chase, but she manages to escape. However, her guide dog, Cong-Cong is killed in the melee.

The search now begins as the police unit notice that all the missing women had disappeared after being set up for a date on the "Let's Meet" dating app. Linchong notices the male usernames are all lyrics from the same song and guesses the next username will be the song's next line. They trace the owner of the account to Tang Zhen, a plastic surgeon and the culprit, who began kidnapping women using the dating app after he accidentally killed his own sister in a confrontation about her online dating in an effort to remake them into his late sister's image. Xiaoxing brings Linchong to her old home, and she reveals that she is the older sister of the dead singer Linchong greatly admires.

After a fight with the police, Tang Zhen traces Xiaoxing to her home and he fanatically offers to kill the both of them together, since they are so similar to the other, both having loved and lost a sibling. However, Linchong appears and temporarily subdues Tang Zhen. Xiaoxing sets the room on fire before escaping the house. In a fury and half burnt, Tang Zhen chases after her, but Linchong swings a golf club at him and manages to bring the fight outside, where they fight in the pool. While Xiaoxing is lying on the ground, Linchong continuously calls for her to get up, and the accident of her brother's death replays but with a different ending. She stands and manages to grab a ukulele and trigger Tang Zhen, luring him towards her, then swinging at him and incapacitating him before the police arrive.

A year later, Xiaoxing watches Linchong performing her brother's song onstage.

== Cast ==
- Yang Mi as Lu Xiaoxing
- Lu Han as Lin Chong
- Wang Jingchun as Captain Lu
- Zhu Yawen as Tang Zheng
- Liu Ruilin as Liang Cong
- Lai Yi as Jing Kuang
- Li Xirui as Ya Nan
- Xu Lingyue as Tang Qian

== Reception ==
The film has earned CN¥214 million (US$35.6 million) at the Chinese box office.
