= The Interpreter (TV series) =

- Also known as: Les Interpretes; Dear Translator
- Genre: Workplace; Romance
- Based on: Translator by Miao Juan
- Written by: Hong Jinghui; Ying Yang
- Directed by: Wang Ying
- Starring: Yang Mi; Huang Xuan
- Opening theme: My Dear by Tan Weiwei
- Ending theme: Running Snail by Huang Xuan
- Country of origin: China
- Original language: Mandarin
- No. of episodes: 42, 44 (TV version)

Production
- Producers: Zhao Yifang; Gao Fei; Zeng Jia
- Production locations: Shanghai, Suzhou, Hengchuan, Lausanne, Zürich
- Running time: 45 mins
- Production companies: Croton Media; LeECO; Jay Walk Studio

Original release
- Network: Hunan TV
- Release: 24 May – 19 June 2016

Related
- Negotiator

The Interpreter (Chinese: 亲爱的翻译官; pinyin: Qīn'ài de fānyì guān) is a 2016 Chinese television series starring Yang Mi and Huang Xuan, based on the novel Translator (翻译官) by Miao Juan. It aired on Hunan TV from 24 May to 19 June 2016. The series was the highest rated drama of the year, with an average national viewership rating of 2.63%.

== Synopsis ==
Qiao Fei, a university student majoring in French studies, has aspired to become a translator since she was young. Raised by a single mother suffering from a serious illness, she has to support herself working as a waitress. One night she gets into a trouble with a guest, and the two of them are taken to the police station. The guest happens to be Cheng Jiayang, a young but already famous professional French translator. The next day, she finds out that Jia Yang is actually her examiner at the prestigious Institute of Advanced Translation where she dreams of getting a job. Although they start their relationship on the wrong foot, Qiao Fei earns Jiayang's praise when she successfully overcomes his tests and the two start to develop feelings for each other. When everything seems to be going smoothly, problems start to arise one after another. Jiayang's mother strongly opposes their relationship and the reappearance of Gao Jiaming, Qiao Fei's ex-boyfriend, causes additional misunderstandings between Qiao Fei and Jiayang. Mounting problems eventually lead to their separation. Only after overcoming their respective life challenges they meet again and rekindle their love.

== Cast ==
- Yang Mi as Qiao Fei
- Huang Xuan as Cheng Jiayang
- Gao Weiguang as Gao Jiaming
- Zhou Qiqi as Wen Xiaohua
- Li Xirui as Wu Jiayi
- Zhang Yunlong as Wang Xudong
- Wang Renjun as Zhou Nan
- Li Dongheng as Li Lei
- Yi Yanting as Yang Yan
- Li Yunao as Wu Ming
- Zhang Mingming as Ao Tian
- Jiang Xifan as He Zhe
- Yang Xueying as Wen Jing

== Soundtrack ==
No.	Title	Singer	Length
1.	"My Dear (我親愛的)" (Opening theme song)	Tan Weiwei
2.	"Running Snail (奔跑的蝸牛)" (Ending theme song)	Huang Xuan
3.	"Better Than Being Entangled (好過糾纏)"	Jin Chi
4.	"I'd sing for you"	Bastian Baker
5.	"79 Clinton Street"	Bastian Baker

== Reception ==
The series is a commercial hit in China. Its premiere achieved a national viewer rating share of 6.87%, and topped 2016's overall market share for the first half of the year. Viewership ratings also reached as high as 2%, making it the highest rated drama of 2016. The topic "Dear Translator" (亲爱的翻译官) attracted over a billion readers within five days. On the online video platforms Mango TV (芒果TV) and LeTV (乐视电视), the series has received more than 100 million views. On the Asian TV drama platform Viki, the series was rated 9.3 out of 10.

The series was praised by Martin Dahinden, Swiss ambassador to China. The series was coincidentally filmed during the 65th anniversary of the establishment of China–Switzerland relations, and was sponsored by the Switzerland Tourism Board.

There is a sequel titled Negotiator that has cast Yang Mi and Huang Zitao as leads. The sequel has a different storyline.

== Ratings ==
Hunan TV ratings
Air date	Episode	CSM52 city network ratings			National Internet ratings		
Air date	Episode	Ratings (%)	Audience share (%)	Rank	Ratings (%)	Audience share (%)	Rank
24 May 2016	1-2	1.413	4.256	1	1.76	5.84	1
25 May 2016	3-4	1.518	4.555	1	1.95	6.36	1
26 May 2016	5-6	1.839	5.48	1	2.15	6.87	1
27 May 2016	7	1.43	4.41	1	1.77	5.72	1
28 May 2016	8	1.448	4.57	1	1.76	6.26	1
29 May 2016	9-10	1.982	5.763	1	2.49	8.06	1
30 May 2016	11-12	2.175	6.581	1	2.41	7.94	1
31 May 2016	13-14	2.354	6.985	1	2.94	9.29	1
1 June 2016	15-16	2.344	7.216	1	2.84	9.27	1
2 June 2016	17-18	2.357	7.146	1	2.78	8.82	1
3 June 2016	19	1.15	4.815	1	1.84	6.84	1
4 June 2016	20	2.057	6.683	1	2.60	9.36	1
5 June 2016	21-22	2.321	6.851	1	3.14	10.05	1
6 June 2016	23-24	2.280	6.887	1	2.81	9.20	1
7 June 2016	25-26	2.167	6.552	1	2.65	8.66	1
8 June 2016	27-28	2.465	7.479	1	3.36	10.89	1
9 June 2016	29-30	2.31	7.142	1	3.52	11.46	1
10 June 2016	31	1.629	5.233	1	2.22	8.42	1
11 June 2016	32	1.64	5.02	1	2.28	8.10	1
12 June 2016	33-34	2.139	6.249	1	2.83	9.38	1
13 June 2016	35-36	2.020	5.903	1	2.66	8.93	1
14 June 2016	37-38	2.026	5.948	1	2.83	9.25	1
15 June 2016	39-40	2.192	6.54	1	3.08	10.1	1
16 June 2016	41-42	2.148	6.639	1	3.01	10.06	1
17 June 2016	43	1.585	5.198	1	2.31	9.12	1
18 June 2016	44	1.836	5.98	1	2.55	10.04	1
19 June 2016	Classics	1.88	5.647	1	2.65	8.99	1
Average ratings		2.048%	6.19%	1	2.63%	8.74%	1

- Highest ratings are marked in red, lowest ratings are marked in blue

== Awards and nominations ==
Year	Award	Category	Nominated work	Result
2016	8th China TV Drama Awards	Top Ten Television Series	—N/a	Won
2016	8th China TV Drama Awards	Talented Actor Award	Huang Xuan	Won
2017	22nd Huading Awards	Best Actor	Huang Xuan	Nominated
2017	22nd Huading Awards	Best New Actor	Vengo Gao	Nominated
2017	22nd Huading Awards	Top 10 Television Series	—N/a	Won

== Spin-off ==
A spin-off was also produced, titled Negotiator, also based on Miao Juan's novel.
