= Negotiator (TV series) =

2018 Chinese television series

- Also known as: Negotiation
- Genre: Workplace; Romance
- Written by: Fei Huijun; Li Xiaoliang
- Directed by: Liu Yizhi
- Starring: Yang Mi; Huang Zitao
- Country of origin: China
- Original language: Mandarin
- No. of seasons: 1
- No. of episodes: 43 (TV), 41 (DVD)

Production
- Production locations: Shanghai; New York; Hawaii
- Running time: 45 mins
- Production companies: Croton Media; Jay Walk Studio; Le.com; T.H Entertainment

Original release
- Network: Hunan TV
- Release: February 4 – March 3, 2018

Related
- The Interpreter

Negotiator (Chinese: 谈判官) is a 2018 Chinese television series starring Yang Mi and Huang Zitao. It is a spin-off of the 2016 television series The Interpreter also starring Yang Mi. The series premiered on Hunan TV starting February 4, 2018.

Negotiator has a 3.5 rating on Douban from over 44,000 reviews.

== Synopsis ==
Tong Wei, a brilliant commercial negotiator, and the star executive of the US-China Business Council, is hired to represent Xie Xiaofei's company interests at the negotiating table. Xiaofei is the sole heir of a wealthy Chinese-American corporation but wants nothing to do with the family business. He vents his frustrations on Tong Wei, though their bickering relationship soon takes a romantic turn. The couple separates when Tong Wei is banned from being with Xiaofei. However, after time they find each other once more.

== Cast ==
=== Main ===
Actor	Character	Introduction
Yang Mi	Tong Wei	A negotiator at CAEA firm. She is bold, but cautious.
Huang Zitao	Xie Xiaofei	Heir of Xie organization. An arrogant and intractable man who despite his playful tendencies, is a capable businessman.

=== Supporting ===
Actor	Character	Introduction
Dylan Kuo	Qin Tianyu	A lawyer who is loyal in love, and has a one-sided crush on Tong Wei.
Mao Linlin	Xia Shanshan	Tong Wei's close friend. A skilled negotiator who gave up her career to be with Qi Runhai.
Yang Feixiang	Zhao Chenxi	Daughter of Ke Wan Company who determined to marry Xiaofei through the marriage alliance set up by Xiaofei's father and Chenxi's father.
Winston Chao	Xie Tianyou	Xie Xiaofei's father.
Zhu Xudan	Shang Bichen	A junior who looks up to Tianyu and has one-sided love for him.
Lai Yi	Xie Xiaotian	Xie Xiaofei's younger brother.
Zhao Chulun	Yang Xiao	A friend of Chenxi, he does everything for her and secretly likes her.
Li Tingting	Tong Tiantian	Tong Wei's cousin.
Shi Wenxiang	Sun Hao	
Andrew Lin aka Lian Kai	Qi Ruhai	Boyfriend of Shan Shan who is divorced.
Mao Jiaming	Hu Di	CAE employee, Xiao Xiang's subordinate.
Yu Yonghai	Situ Zhigao	

== Reception ==
The reception of Negotiator has been extremely negative. The series has a 3.5 rating on Douban, with 1 star reviews taking 58.9% of rating. Although starring famous Chinese celebrities such as Yang Mi and Huang Zitao, the series failed to live to the success of its predecessor The Interpreter. The drama has been criticized for its clichéd storyline, poor acting, and depiction of workplace abuse.

== Soundtrack ==
No.	Title	Lyrics	Music	Singers	Length
1.	"The World Turns Around For You (世界为你转身)" (Opening Theme song)	Chen Xi	Dong Dongdong	Zhang Lei
2.	"Love The One I Want To Love (爱我想爱的人)" (Ending Theme song)	Chen Xi	Dong Dongdong	Sun Bolun
3.	"Cannot Love (爱不得)" (Theme song)	Chen Xi	Dong Dongdong	Aska Yang
4.	"Blind Confidence (盲目自信)" (Insert song)	Chen Xi	Dong Dongdong	Yisa Yu
5.	"Little Happiness (小幸福)" (Insert song)	Chen Xi	Dong Dongdong	He Jie

== Ratings ==
- In the table below, the blue numbers represent the lowest ratings and the red numbers represent the highest ratings.

Episode #	Original broadcast date	CSM52 Cities (%)			CSM Nationwide (%)		
Episode #	Original broadcast date	Ratings	Audience share	Ranking	Ratings	Audience share	Ranking
1-2	February 4, 2018	1.214	3.985	2	1.636	5.3	1
3-4	February 5, 2018	1.238	4.14	2	1.71	5.67	1
5-6	February 6, 2018	1.223	4.152	2	1.753	5.914	1
7-8	February 7, 2018	1.312	4.457	3	1.748	5.919	1
9	February 9, 2018	0.929	3.11	1	1.327	4.276	1
10	February 10, 2018	0.829	2.75	2	1.277	4.137	1
11-12	February 11, 2018	1.210	3.95	1	1.736	5.626	1
13-14	February 12, 2018	1.187	4.02	1	1.87	6.15	1
15-16	February 13, 2018	1.101	3.65	1	1.82	5.90	1
17-18	February 14, 2018	1.102	3.59	1	1.76	5.61	1
19	February 15, 2018	0.503	1.63	1	1.03	2.91	1
20	February 17, 2018	0.778	3.01	1	1.16	4.16	1
21-22	February 18, 2018	0.965	3.51	1	1.54	5.34	1
23-24	February 19, 2018	1.005	3.56	1	1.61	5.49	1
25-26	February 20, 2018	1.168	4.026	1	1.84	6.05	1
27-28	February 21, 2018	1.306	4.33	1	1.92	6.4	1
29-30	February 22, 2018	1.304	4.31	1	2.14	6.99	1
31	February 23, 2018	1.002	3.271	1	1.41	4.70	1
32	February 24, 2018	1.071	3.47	1	1.58	5.04	1
33-34	February 25, 2018	1.359	4.529	1	1.88	6.34	1
35-36	February 26, 2018	1.353	4.514	1	1.84	6.16	1
37-38	February 27, 2018	1.322	4.451	1	1.87	6.28	1
39-40	February 28, 2018	1.275	4.34	1	1.83	6.29	1
41-42	March 1, 2018	1.401	4.738	1	2.09	7.02	1
43	March 3, 2018	1.147	3.95	1	1.72	5.89	1
Average		1.132	3.82	-	1.68	5.58	-

== Awards and nominations ==
Award	Category	Nominated work	Result	Ref.
Influence of Recreational Responsibilities Awards	TV Drama of the Year		Won	
