= Vin Zhang =

Chinese actor (born 1993)

Zhang Binbin
- 张彬彬
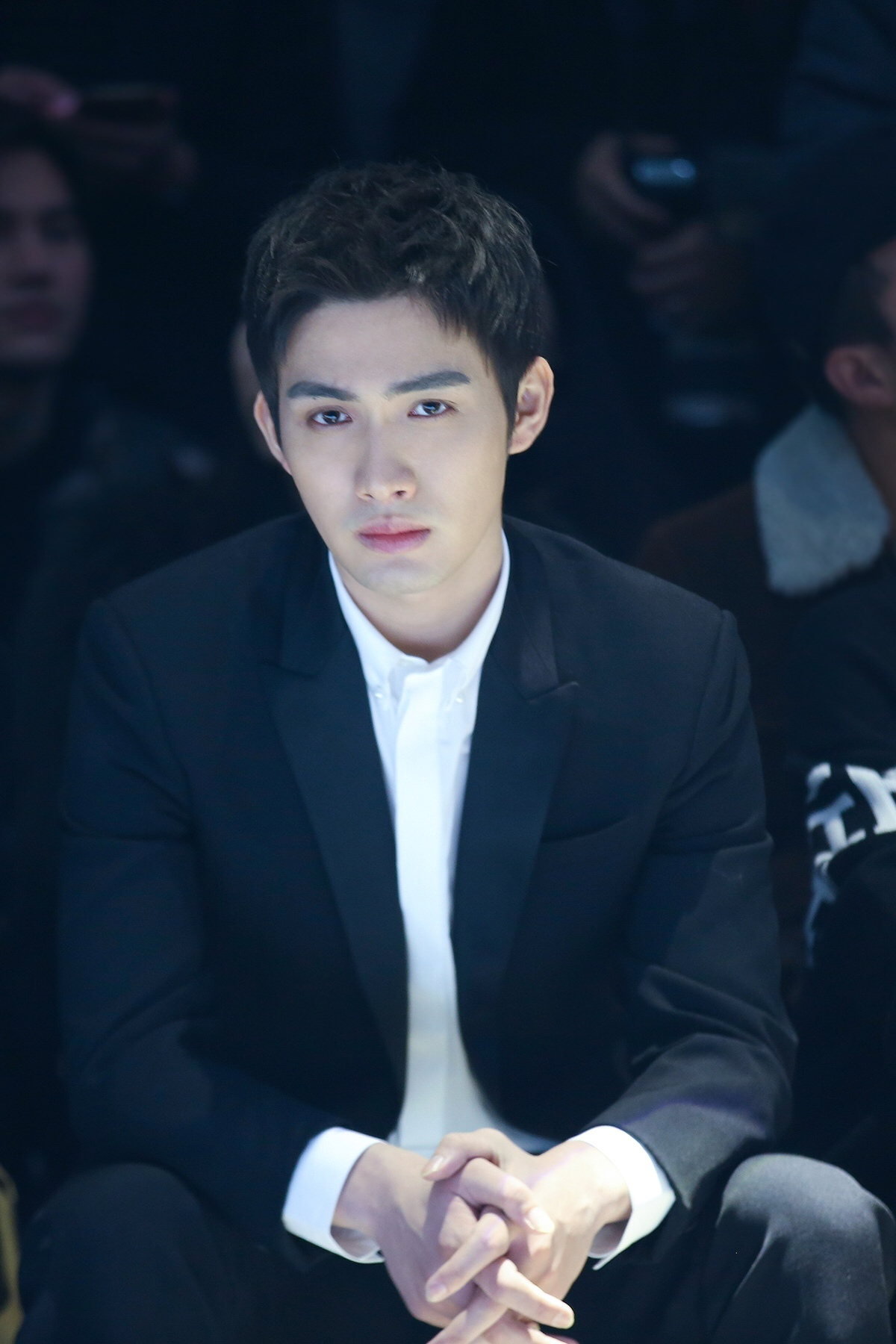
- Zhang in 2024
- Born: January 19, 1993 (age 33); Wuxi, Jiangsu, China
- Education: Shanghai Theatre Academy
- Occupation: Actor
- Years active: 2014–present
- Agent: Zhang Binbin Studio

Chinese name
- Traditional Chinese: 張彬彬
- Simplified Chinese: 张彬彬
Transcriptions
Standard Mandarin
- Hanyu Pinyin: Zhāng bīn bīn

Zhang Binbin (Chinese: 张彬彬, born 19 January 1993), also known as Vin Zhang, is a Chinese actor. He made his acting debut in the show V Love (2014) and received recognition for his roles in Chronicle of Life (2016), The King's Woman (2017), and Rattan (2021).

== Career ==
=== 2014–15: Career beginnings ===
Zhang made his acting debut in the web melodrama V Love (2014), which was produced by Jay Walk Studio and aired on Tencent. He also released the singles "Our Era" and "Heavenly Stairs" for the drama.

In 2015, Zhang played his first leading role in the youth web drama Long Time No See, which is the sequel to Fleet of Time.

=== 2016–present: Rising popularity ===
In February 2016, Zhang starred in the historical melodrama Chronicle of Life alongside Hawick Lau and Zheng Shuang. The series saw high ratings and Zhang was acclaimed by netizens and fans of the original novel for his portrayal of his character. Zhang gained further recognition for his role as a mysterious hacker in the hit romance comedy drama Love O2O.

In 2017, Zhang starred in romance comedy Pretty Li Huizhen, the Chinese remake of South Korean series She Was Pretty alongside Dilraba Dilmurat and Peter Sheng, portraying a goofy and free-spirited editor. He then featured in the hit fantasy romance drama Eternal Love, playing a devilish prince named Li Jing of the Ghost Tribe. With his portrayal of three different and striking roles in Love O2O, She Was Pretty and Eternal Love, Zhang received appraisal for his talent in acting by both the media and fans.

Later in 2017, Zhang starred as the male lead in historical drama The King's Woman alongside Dilraba Dilmurat, playing Qin Shi Huang. He earned critical acclaim for his portrayal of the domineering yet loyal emperor.

In 2018, Zhang starred in the wuxia romance drama The Flame's Daughter.

In 2019, Zhang played the male lead in wuxia romance drama I Will Never Let You Go alongside Ariel Lin. The same year, he starred in the romance workplace drama Love Is Fate.

In 2021, Zhang starred as the male lead of cyber-security drama Storm Eye, hit fantasy suspense drama Rattan, and romance drama Be Together.

He left Jaywalk Studios on July 12, 2022, after 10 years. In his announcement, he said that he plans to continue performing and acting in projects in the future. The next day, he opened his own studio and made his first Weibo post in "Zhang Binbin's official studio" account.

== Philanthropy ==
In 2017, Zhang participated along with other celebrities in a public welfare environmental project that encourages the public to perform charity. Zhang later participated in the Bazaar Stars Charity Night organised by Harper's Bazaar where he donated ambulances to the public.

== Filmography ==
=== Television series ===
| Year | English title | Chinese title | Role | Network | Notes/Ref. |
|---|---|---|---|---|---|
| 2014 | V Love | 微时代 | Han Dingyi | Tencent Video | |
| 2014 | Long Time No See | 匆匆那年：好久不见 | Qiao Ran | Sohu TV | |
| 2014 | Love's M Shape | 爱的M型转弯 | Xiao Jiang | Youku | |
| 2016 | Chronicle of Life | 寂寞空庭春欲晚 | Nalan Rongruo | Zhejiang TV | |
| 2016 | The Legend of the Monster | 都市妖奇谈 | Liu Di | iQIYI | |
| 2016 | Angel Wings | 隐形的翅膀 | Duan Gang | Shenchuan TV | |
| 2016 | Love O2O | 微微一笑很倾城 | KO | Dragon TV, Jiangsu TV, Youku | |
| 2017 | Pretty Li Huizhen | 漂亮的李慧珍 | Lin Yimu | Hunan TV | |
| 2017 | Eternal Love | 三生三世十里桃花 | Li Jing | Dragon TV, Zhejiang TV | |
| 2017 | The King's Woman | 秦时丽人明月心 | Ying Zheng | Zhejiang TV | |
| 2018 | The Flame's Daughter | 烈火如歌 | Zhan Feng | Youku | |
| 2019 | I Will Never Let You Go | 小女花不弃 | Chen Yu / Lian Yike | Zhejiang TV | |
| 2019 | Love Is Fate | 我爱你这是最好的安排 | Xia Yuhang | Mango TV | |
| 2021 | Storm Eye | 暴风眼 | Ma Shang | Dragon TV, Zhejiang TV | |
| 2021 | Rattan | 司藤 | Qin Fang | Youku | |
| 2021 | Be Together | 我和我们在一起 | Xu Chengyi | Mango TV | |
| 2022 | Song of the Moon | 月歌行 | Luo Ge / Lu Li | iQIYI | |
| 2022 | A Romance of the Little Forest | 两个人的小森林 | Zhuang Yu | Youku | |
| 2023 | Here We Meet Again | 三分野 | Xu Yanshi | Tencent Video | |
| 2023 | Fireworks of My Heart | 我的人间烟火 | Suo Jun | Mango TV | |
| 2024 | Live Surgery Room | 手术直播间 | Zheng Ren | Youku | |
| 2025 | The Blossoming Love | 千朵桃花一世开 | Xie Xuechen | Youku | |
| 2025 | Light Beyond the Reed | 余生有涯 | Qin Nan | Tencent Video | |
| TBA | Long Gu Fen Xiang | 龙骨焚箱 | Jiang Lian | Tencent Video | |
| TBA | Eight Strange Cases of the Republic | 民国八大奇案 | Luo Zhengyi | iQIYI | |

=== Variety show ===
| Year | English title | Chinese title | Role | Notes/Ref. |
|---|---|---|---|---|
| 2018 | Beyond it! Hero | 超越吧！英雄 | Cast member | |
| 2022 | First In Last Out | 一往无前的蓝 | | |

== Discography ==
=== Singles ===
| Year | English title | Chinese title | Album | Notes/Ref. |
|---|---|---|---|---|
| 2014 | "Our Era" | 我们的时代 | V Love OST | with cast members |
| 2014 | "Heavenly Stairs" | 天梯 | V Love OST | with Li Xirui |
| 2016 | "A Smile is Beautiful" | 一笑倾城 | Love O2O OST | with Zheng Yecheng, Bai Yu, Zhang He & Cui Hang |
| 2017 | "To Love Completely" | 愛得起 | Pretty Li Huizhen OST | with Li Xirui |
| 2019 | "Year of Reunion" | 团圆年 | | Performance for Performance for CCTV Lantern Festival |

== Awards and nominations ==
| Year | Award | Category | Nominated work | Result | Ref. |
|---|---|---|---|---|---|
| 2016 | Fashion Power Awards | New Artist Award | —N/a | Won | |
| 2017 | Instyle Icon Awards | Popular Male Artist | —N/a | Won | |
| 2017 | Weibo Fashion Awards | Most Talented New Male Artist | —N/a | Won | |
| 2017 | 9th China TV Drama Awards | Most Promising Actor | —N/a | Won | |
| 2019 | CCTV Spring Gala | Youth Role Model | —N/a | Won | |
| 2019 | Golden Bud - The Fourth Network Film And Television Festival | Best Actor | I Will Never Let You Go, Love is Fate | Nominated | |
