= Li Xian filmography =

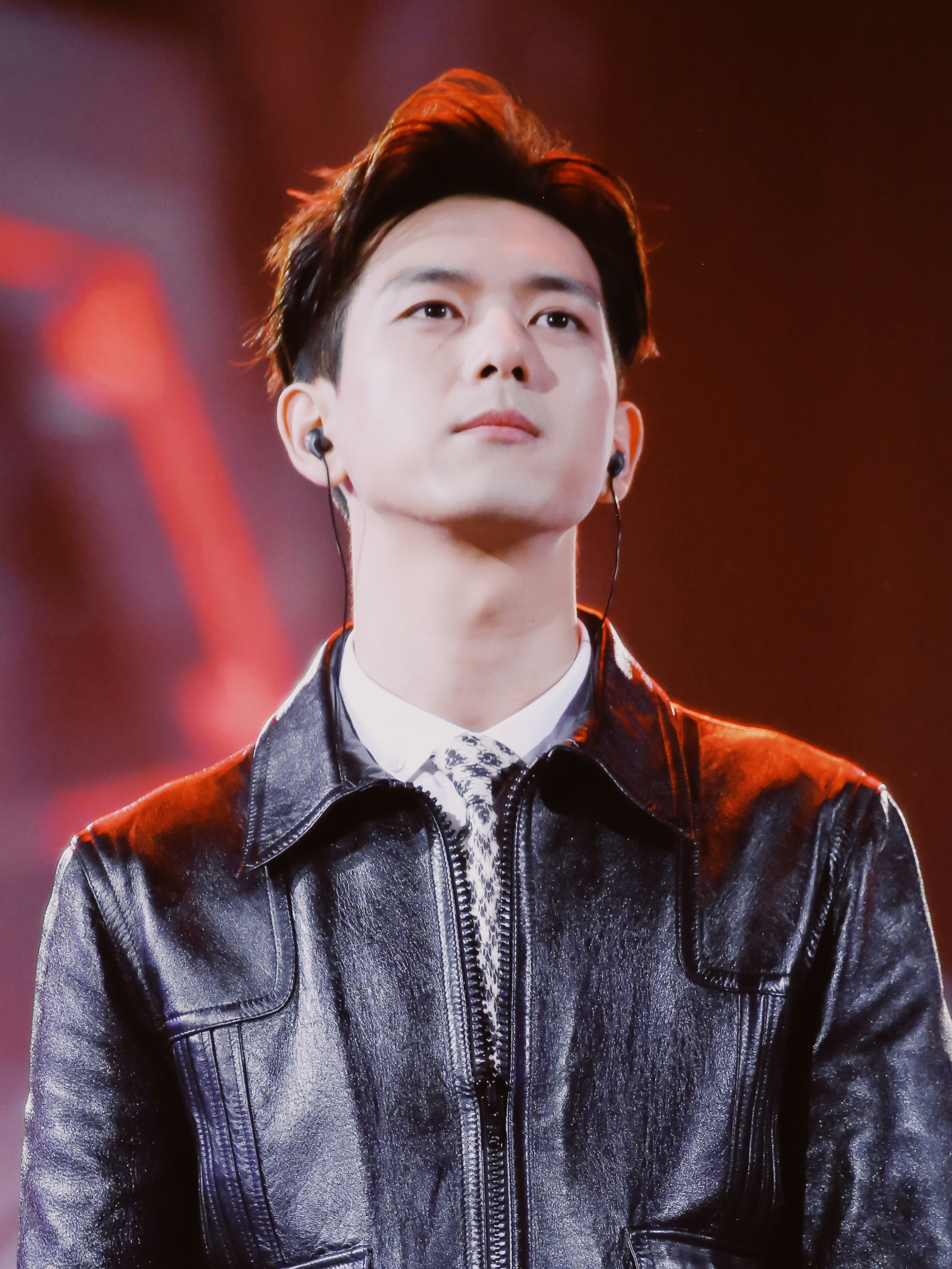
- Li Xian in 2020
- Film: 13
- Television series: 12

Chinese actor Li Xian debuted in 2011, and is known for his roles in Tientsin Mystic and Go Go Squid.

== Career summary ==
Li began his career by appearing in small roles when he was a sophomore in director Wang Jing's film, Feng Shui. Director Wang Jing at that time was a teacher in the photography department of Li's school, he wanted to find the kind of Hubei children who are 18 or 19 years old and preparing for the college entrance examination. The following year, he had a small role in the romance teen flick Singing When We're Young, produced by Andy Lau. In 2014, Li made his small-screen debut in the omnibus web drama City of Fantasy.

In 2015, Li co-starred with Chen Xiao, Du Tianhao and Liu Ruilin in the coming-of-age brotherhood web series Who Sleeps My Bro which is adapted from Gao Xiaosong's song with the same name. To meet the image of the rough man required in the play, he barely went to the playground to play football in the sunshine at 30 °C. Going to move with the people of the moving company, and finally became a dark, strong, bearded guy-Xie Xun. In 2016 the series adapted into a film starring the original cast. In the same year he co-starred with Angelababy, Jing Bairan, and Bai Yu in the romantic movie "Love O2O", and played as Yu Banshan, best friends of leading actor Xiao Nai in the film. In the same year Li co-starred alongside Zhang Ruoyun and Jiao Junyan in the first domestic forensic industry web drama Medical Examiner Dr. Qin as the criminal police captain Lin Tao. The drama has been praised for its bold plots, tense storyline and good-looking performers. The web drama garnered 1.2 Billion views.

Li received his first starring role in web drama Tientsin Mystic as Guo Deyou. In order to shaped the character, practicing Mengzai, free diving, snorkeling, and deep diving. The web drama marks big improvement of quality of Chinese online series dramas, received Douban scored 8.2 and Netflix bought the copyright. Li also received a lot of praise for his acting, and marked his rising popularity. In the same year, Li with other Chinese young actor participated in the film The Founding of an Army, dedicated to the 90th anniversary of the establishment of People's Liberation Army, as Luo Ronghuan. In 2018, Li starred in the romance drama Only Side by Side with You as a special forces agent, Chang Jianxiong. In order to play the role, Li gained 20 pounds in 45 days and trained 8 abdominal muscles. Li also made a special appearance in web drama, Women in Shanghai. In the same year Li co-starred again with Zhang Ruoyun in Nuts, as Xu Zicong the rich second generation who has high both IQ as well as emotional intelligence that make him Huang Jian's biggest competitor

At the end of 2017, Li Xian, who was still busy with the promotion period of Tientsin Mystic received an invitation to the live action costume drama Sword Dynasty. He entered the group three months in advance to receive sword training and physical training. The shooting began in 2018, in order to present the most perfect shot, he often shoots it over and over again. There is a 360-degree rollover lens in Weihua. He has repeatedly shot more than 20 times. After the filming, he has suffered from muscle strain. The web drama was broadcast on iQIYI after his hit romance comedy e-sports drama, Go Go Squid!

Li revealed that he was filming in Hengdian, when the staff recommended the novel and script of Go Go Squid! to him. Li received the offered because hi thought that the character has a lot of fits with him, right perseverance in work and dreams, just like his attitude towards his career as an actor. According to Fang Ying, vice-president of Huace/Croton Media who produced Go Go Squid!, when Li first came on set he couldn't walk properly, however, he overcame the injury and spared no effort in coping with the filming schedule. The drama not only captured a large number of young fans but also included a group of "mom fans" with economic strength for Li Xian, made him named as a new fresh meat in the Chinese entertainment industry. Li later made a cameo appearance as Air Traffic Controller in Chinese film The Captain directed by Hong Kong’s Andrew Lau Wai-keung, which is based on a real-life mid-air crisis aboard a Sichuan Airlines flight. He sing the soundtrack of Red Fox Scholar, titled Glorious Future (Qian Cheng Si jin) with Chen Linong and peak at 8 on Billboard China Social Chart.

In 2018 Li starred in the film The Enigma of Arrival, which premiered at the Busan International Film Festival. The film scheduled to be released on Valentine's Day 2020, but delayed to amid the Coronavirus disease.

== Filmography ==
=== Film ===
Key
| † | Denotes films that have not yet been released |

List of film performances
| Year | Title | | Role | Film Production | Notes | Ref. |
| Year | English | Chinese | Role | Film Production | Notes | Ref. |
|---|---|---|---|---|---|---|
| 2012 | Feng Shui | 万箭穿心 | Ma Xiaobao | | | |
| 2013 | Singing When We're Young | 初恋未满 | Da Wei | | | |
| 2016 | Who Sleeps My Bro | 睡在我上铺的兄弟 | Xie Xun | | | |
| 2016 | Love O2O | 微微一笑很倾城 | Yu Banshan | | | |
| 2017 | Deadly Love | 玩命试爱 | Fang Zhibin | | | |
| 2017 | The Founding of an Army | 建军大业 | Luo Ruohang | | | |
| 2018 | Nuts | 奇葩朵朵 | Xu Zicong | | | |
| 2018 | The Enigma of Arrival | 抵达之谜 | Zhao Xiaolong | | | |
| 2019 | The Captain | 中国机长 | Luo Xiaolin | | Special Appearance | |
| 2020 | Leap | 夺冠 | General Administration of Sport's director | | Special Appearance | |
| 2020 | Love Song 1980 | 恋曲1980 | Liang Zhengwen | Midnight Blur Films | | |
| 2020 | Soul Snatcher | 赤狐书生 | Bai Shisan | Bill Kong Entertainment | | |
| 2021 | Schemes in Antiques | 古董局中局 | Yao Buran | Emperor Motion Pictures | | |
| 2023 | I Believe | 靠近我一点 | Yu Kefeng | | | |
| 2024 | She's Got No Name | 酱园弄 | Zhang Baofu | | | |

=== Television series ===
Key
| † | Denotes television series that have not yet been released |

List of television drama performances
| Year | Title | | Role | Notes | Ref. |
| Year | English | Chinese | Role | Notes | Ref. |
|---|---|---|---|---|---|
| 2014 | City of Fantasy | 奇妙世纪 | A Liang | | |
| 2016 | Four Ladies | 翩翩冷少俏佳人 | Ding Zihui | | |
| 2016 | Who Sleeps My Bro | 睡在我上铺的兄弟 | Xie Xun | | |
| 2016 | Medical Examiner Dr. Qin | 法医秦明 | Lin Tao | | |
| 2017 | Rush to the Dead Summer | 夏至未至 | Qing Yun | Cameo | |
| 2017 | Tientsin Mystic | 河神 | Guo Deyou | Lead role; Nomination, 2019 The Actors of China Award for Best Web Drama Actor | |
| 2018 | Only Side by Side with You | 南方有乔木 | Chang Jianxiong | | |
| 2018 | Women in Shanghai | 上海女子图鉴 | Chen Xiaowei | Special appearance | |
| 2019 | Go Go Squid! | 亲爱的，热爱的 | Han Shangyan | Lead role; Nomination, 2019 Huading Awards for Best Newcomer; Nomination, 2019 The Actors of China Award for Best Actor (Category Emerald) | |
| 2019 | Sword Dynasty | 剑王朝 | Ding Ning | Lead role; Nomination, 2020 Asia Content Award for Best Actor; Nomination, 2020 The Actors of China Award for Best Actor (Category Emerald) | |
| 2021 | Go Go Squid 2: Dt. Appledog's Time | 我的时代，你的时代 | Han Shangyan | Special Appearance | |
| 2021 | 11 Left | 剩下的11个 | Chen Zhenyu / Fan Qiang / Yao Yi | | |
| 2023 | Meet Yourself | 去有风的地方 | Xie Zhiyao | | |
| 2024 | Shooting Stars | 群星闪耀时 | Xiang Yuansheng/Hua Zhen | | |
| 2024 | Will Love in Spring | 春色寄情人 | Chen Maidong | | |
| 2025 | Flourished Peony | 国色芳华 | Jiang Changyang/Sui Zhi | | |
| 2025 | A Love Never Lost | 人生若如初见 | Liang Xiang / Yu Bugu | | |
| 2025 | In the Name of Blossom | 锦绣芳华 | Jiang Changyang/Sui Zhi | | |
| TBA | A Prophet † | 长风起 | Shangguan Chengming | | |
| TBA | A Touch of Green † | 雾里青 | Meng Fuyuan | | |
