= List of awards and nominations received by Li Xian =

Li Xian Awards and Nominations
Awards and nominations
| Award | Wins | Nominations |
| Huading Awards | 0 | 1 |
| The Actors of China Awards | 3 | 3 |
| iQIYI All Star Awards | 1 | 0 |
| Netease Awards | 1 | 0 |
| Tencent Video All Star Awards | 2 | 0 |
| Weibo Awards Ceremony | 3 | 0 |
| Weibo TV Series Awards | 0 | 1 |

Totals (Note: Certain award groups do not simply award one winner. They acknowledge several different recipients, have runners-up, and have third place. Since this is a specific recognition and is different from losing an award, runner-up mentions are considered wins in this award tally. For simplification and to avoid errors, each award in this list has been presumed to have had a prior nomination.)
- Wins: 23
- Nominations: 38

Li Xian (Chinese: 李现; born 19 October 1991) is a Chinese actor. His role as Guo Deyou in Tientsin Mystic earned him a nomination at The Actors of China Award for Best Web Drama Actor, and popularity award from Netease Awards. In 2019, his role as Han Shangyan on Go Go Squid! earned him a nomination at Huading Awards for Best Newcomer, and a nomination at The Actors of China Award for Best Actor (Emerald Category). He won Tencent Video All Star Awards for Quality Actor of the Year, and popularity awards at Weibo, Weibo TV Awards, iQIYI All-Star Carnival, GQ Men of the Year, Esquire's Man At His Best Awards, Film and TV Role Model Annual Ranking, and Best Choice of Multi-Screen Communication for Influential Actor. He listed as The Beijing News' "Entertainment Person of the Year", as well as a spot in Forbes China 30 Under 30.

== Awards and nominations ==
| Award ceremony | Year | Category | Nominee(s)/work(s) | Result | Ref. |
Major awards
| Busan International Film Festival Asia Contents Awards (Note: The Asia Contents Awards are a reward for the finest TV dramas produced over the past years from Asia.) | 2020 | Best Actor (Note: Award given in honor of an actor who has delivered an outstanding performance among the nominations per Asian country.) | Sword Dynasty | Nominated | |
| China TV Golden Eagle Awards | 2024 | Best Actor | Meet Yourself | Nominated | |
| Huading Awards | 2019 | Best New Actor | Go Go Squid! | Nominated | |
| The Actors of China Awards (Note: The Actors of China Award is the only national event set up for Chinese TV actors in the field of Chinese TV arts. The goal of this award is to start with the abstraction of all professional abstractions, moral qualities, and social cultivation of Chinese TV actors. To guide television actors to establish a good social abstraction for "patriotic, serving the people, admiring virtue, and pursuing art". The main purpose is to find those actors who convey positive energy and have acting skills.) | 2020 | Best Performance by an Actor-Green Team (Note: Candidates for the Emerald Group are 18 to 35 years old, From this, one "male Chinese TV actress" and one female are produced. The awardee selected based on their love to the motherland, the people, the life, and the era. Acting seriously and constantly innovating. The screen image created is widely loved by the audience and praised by the industry; respecting teachers and friends, advocating sincerity, and having good professional ethics and social responsibility) | Go Go Squid! | Nominated | |
| The Actors of China Awards | 2020 | Outstanding Actor | Go Go Squid! | Won | |
| The Actors of China Awards | 2019 | Best Performance by an Actor-Green Team | Go Go Squid! | Nominated | |
| The Actors of China Awards | 2019 | Outstanding Actor | Go Go Squid! | Won | |
| The Actors of China Awards | 2018 | Best Performance by an Actor-Internet Drama | Tientsin Mystic | Nominated | |
| The Actors of China Awards | 2017 | Best Performance by an Actor-Internet Drama | Tientsin Mystic | Nominated | |
| The Actors of China Awards | 2017 | Outstanding Actor | Tientsin Mystic | Won | |
Other awards
| People's Daily Digital Communication and Fusion Screen Ceremony (Note: Awarding ceremony for selected artwork, broadcast platforms and artistic workers representative of the country's new era. Organized by People's Daily, Global Times Research Center and data company Gozen Data, the activity generated praise for TV series, reality shows, actors and actresses and broadcasting platforms for having model values in the new era.) | 2020 | Influential Actor | Li Xian | Won | |
| Beijing News Weekly | 2019 | Person of the Year | Li Xian | Won | |
| China Quality TV Drama Awards | 2021 | Quality Interpretation of Creativity Drama Star | Li Xian | Won | |
| China Quality TV Drama Awards | 2021 | Quality Shining Drama Star | Li Xian | Won | |
| Esquire Man At His Best Awards | 2019 | Most Promising Actor of the Year | Li Xian | Won | |
| Film and TV Role Model Annual Ranking (Note: The primary list of "Film and TV Models · 2019 General Appraisal List" was recommended and submitted by film and television production companies, video websites, local satellite TV and professional data agencies. The selection consistent goal of "film and television role model", adhere to the promotion of mainstream values, follow the mainstream cultural value orientation, adhere to the three-in-one combination of quality, word-of-mouth and orientation, and combine the unified evaluation system of mass evaluation, expert evaluation and market inspection. The best masterpieces that meet the aesthetics of the general audience and have a good reputation are selected. The overall ranking will be calculated according to the proportion of "media review 40% + expert review 30% + online vote 30%", and finally form the list of "Film and TV Models · 2019 Annual Overall Ranking", which will be announced in Beijing in early January 2020.) | 2019 | Actor of the Year | Li Xian | Won | |
| Golden Bud - Network Film And Television Festival (Note: "Golden BDO Network Film Festival" is a brand project of BDO Media. It can be called the annual event of the network film and television industry. It is known as the "Oscar of Network Film and Television". It has recorded the brilliant bloom of many excellent online students, and also witnessed The glory of many potential actors was born, which provided a strong impetus for the healthy and positive development of the online film and television industry.) | 2019 | Best Actor | Go Go Squid! | Nominated | |
| GQ Men of the Year China | 2020 | Upward Force of the Year | Li Xian | Won | |
| GQ Men of the Year China | 2019 | Popular Actor of the Year | Li Xian | Won | |
| Golden Rumdul Award | 2021 | Best Actor | The Enigma of Arrival | Won | |
| Harper's Bazaar Icon Awards | 2020 | Popular Icon of the Year | Li Xian | Won | |
| iQiyi All-Star Carnival | 2019 | Scream King | Go Go Squid! | Won | |
| Jinri Toutiao Awards (Note: The grand ceremony generated film and television works, variety shows, and music based on the headline users' attention to and search in the past year.) | 2019 | Brand Value Star of the Year | Li Xian | Won | |
| Hengdian Film Festival of China WenRong TV Awards | 2020 | Best Actor | Sword Dynasty | Nominated | |
| Hengdian Film Festival of China WenRong TV Awards | 2019 | Best Actor | Go Go Squid! | Nominated | |
| Netease Awards | 2017 | Most Popular Actor | Tientsin Mystic | Won | |
| Sina Film & TV Awards | 2020 | Most Popular Actor | Go Go Squid! | Nominated | |
| Sina Film & TV Awards | 2019 | Most Popular Actor | Go Go Squid! | Nominated | |
| Sir Movie Cultural And Entertainment Industry Award | 2019 | Best Couple | Go Go Squid! shared with Yang Zi | Nominated | |
| Sohu Fashion Awards | 2019 | Popular Male Star of the Year | Li Xian | Nominated | |
| Sohu Fashion Awards | 2019 | National Drama Male Star of the Year | Go Go Squid! | Nominated | |
| Tencent Entertainment White Paper | 2020 | Film Actor of the Year | Soul Snatcher, The Enigma of Arrival, Leap | Won | |
| Tencent Video All Star Award | 2020 | Quality Actor of the Year | The Enigma of Arrival | Won | |
| Tencent Video All Star Award | 2019 | Quality Actor of the Year | Go Go Squid! | Won | |
| Weibo TV Series Awards | 2020 | Most Popular Actor | Sword Dynasty | Won | |
| Weibo TV Series Awards | 2019 | Most Popular Actor | Go Go Squid! | Nominated | |
| Weibo Awards Ceremony | 2019 | Breakthrough Actor of the Year | Li Xian | Won | |
| Weibo Awards Ceremony | 2019 | Popular actor of the Year | Go Go Squid! | Won | |
| Weibo Awards Ceremony | 2021 | Charming and Valuable Personality of the Year | Li Xian | Won | |

== Other accolades ==
=== State honors ===
Key
| ‡ | Indicates an honor Li Xian was considered for only |

=== Listicles ===
Name of publisher, year listed, name of listicle, and placement
| Publisher | Year | Listicle | Placement | Ref. |
|---|---|---|---|---|
| Forbes | 2019 | 30 Under 30 (China) | Placed | |
| Forbes | 2020 | Forbes 100 (China) | 19th | |
| Forbes | 2020 | Forbes 100 Digital Star (Asia) | Placed | |
