= Who Sleeps My Bro (TV series) =

2016 Chinese television series

- Theatrical Release Poster
- Also known as: 睡在我上铺的兄弟
- Genre: coming-of-age; Drama
- Based on: Who Sleeps My Bro by Gao Xiaosong
- Written by: Shi Qian; Chen Qian; Zhou Kui; Su Yang
- Directed by: Zhang Qi
- Starring: Chen Xiao; Du Tianhao; Liu Ruilin; Li Xian; Wu You
- Country of origin: China
- Original language: Mandarin
- No. of seasons: 1
- No. of episodes: 26

Production
- Production company: Le Vision Pictures

Original release
- Release: January 17, 2016

Who Sleeps My Bro (Chinese: 睡在我上铺的兄弟; pinyin: Shuì zài wǒ shàng pù de xiōngdì) is a 2016 Chinese web-series coming-of-age comedy drama series based on the song with the same title sung by Gao Xiaosong. Directed by Zhang Qi, starring Chen Xiao, Du Tianhao, Liu Ruilin, and Li Xian. The series premiered on Jiangsu TV and Zhejiang TV on March 25, 2018. Set in a university, the series tells of the struggles, romances, joys and sorrows of four friends.

== Plot ==
Four boys with different personalities from all directions gather in university, including the cheeky Xi’an boy Lin Xiangyu (Chen Xiao), the small boy who grew up in Shanghai (Liu Ruilin), The rich second-generation Li Dapeng (Du Tianhao) and Xing Xun (Li Xian), a boy from Chongqing who has mixed with society. They try to adjust their life as sophomores by playing together, teasing each other, even chasing after beautiful students. But this is a short-lived time after all. After entering the society, they ran for their careers and love, and suffered successive setbacks.

== Cast ==
- Chen Xiao as Lin Xiangyu
- Du Tianhao as Li Dapeng
- Liu Ruilin as Guan Chao
- Li Xian as Xie Xun
- Wu You as Xia Xingchen

== Production ==
To meet the image of the rough man required in the play, Li barely went to the playground to play football in the sunshine at 30 °C. Going to move with the people of the moving company, and finally became a dark, strong, bearded guy-Xie Xun. In 2016 the series adapted into a film starring the original cast.
