= Go Go Squid! =

2019 Chinese television series

- Promotional poster
- 亲爱的，热爱的
- Genre: Romance comedy eSports
- Based on: Stewed Squid with Honey by Mo Bao Fei Bao
- Written by: Mo Bao Fei Bao
- Directed by: Li Jingrong; Xiang Xujing
- Starring: Yang Zi; Li Xian
- Opening theme: "A Nameless Person" by Chen Xueran
- Ending theme: "Milk Bread" by Yang Zi
- Countries of origin: Shanghai, China
- Original language: Mandarin
- No. of seasons: 2
- No. of episodes: 41 (list of episodes)

Production
- Producer: Xiang Xujing
- Running time: 45 minutes
- Production company: Gcoo Entertainment

Original release
- Network: Dragon TV; Zhejiang TV
- Release: July 9 – July 31, 2019

Go Go Squid! (Chinese: 亲爱的，热爱的; pinyin: Qīn Ài De, Rè Ài De) is a Chinese e-sport romance comedy television series directed by Li Qingrong and Xiang Xujing. The series was first aired in 2019, starring Yang Zi and Li Xian. It was an adaptation of Mo Bao Fei Bao's novel "Honey Stewed Squid." The series aired on Dragon TV and Zhejiang TV and was broadcast simultaneously on iQiyi and Tencent Video from 9 to 31 July 2019.

The series is about Tong Nian, a talented computer science major and popular online singer, and Han Shangyan, a cybersecurity professional, who fall in love, support each other, and compete in international cybersecurity competitions. The series was the most-streamed series in 2019, and according to statistics from Yien Broadcasting Index TV series list, Go Go Squid! was the best domestic Chinese TV series in 2019.

There will be a sequel starring Hu Yitian and Li Yitong.

== Plot summary ==
Tong Nian, an intelligent schoolgirl, meets Han Shangyan, a passionate young man who has dedicated his life to winning a world championship for China. Even though Han has a deep sense of responsibility to his teammates, he has trouble communicating and expressing his emotions. With Tong's understanding and support, Han gradually begins to open up to his brothers and family members. The two support and encourage each other as they work towards their dream to win a championship. Along the way, they motivate others to pursue their dreams as well. Throughout the series, Tong and Han display an unrelenting belief in their country, which is often interpreted as the patriotic power of contemporary young people.

== Casts and Characters ==
=== Tong Nian (her highness Squid/ little squid) ===
Portrayed by Yang Zi.

Tong Nian is a talented computer science major who is also a popular online singer. She is described as optimistic, cheerful, soft, and cute. She is also very obedient, attentive, and sensible. She attends the youth class at university and has the same high IQ as the male lead Han Shangyan. After she falls in love with Han Shangyan at first sight, she chooses to take the initiative to pursue a relationship with him. Although Tong Nian loves Han Shangyan a lot, she also continues to pursue her interests and friendships while building a relationship with him. She also pursues her dream of developing an AI-based software, as well as facial recognition programs for the police and medical programs for hospitals.

=== Han Shangyan (Gun) ===
Portrayed by Li Xian.

Considered skilled with computers by his peers and being a high-level e-sports idol, Han Shangyan was the original investor and main member of the Solo team. He won more than ten international championships, earning multiple personal world rankings, and two MVP awards. Following his departure from the team, he established the K&K club with the dream of leading the club's young players to attack the world champion of cybersecurity CTF competitions. His teammates know him as "the boss who is not close to women".

He is committed to his goals but has difficulty expressing himself to others. He is guarded and reserved, with a meticulous and serious attitude. He is proud of his family's native country and was raised by his grandfather and stepmother after his parents died when he was young. According to one source, this deprived him of things that can make a person's character grow fully. He shows little interest in anything outside his career, which he pursues intensely. In private, he cares about the other players, shown through small acts such as covering them with quilts. He has been fascinated by a lot of girls, but has not been interested in dating.

=== Wu Bai (DT) ===
Portrayed by Hu Yitian.

Han Shang Yan's cousin, Wu Bai (DT), is the captain of the K&K team. He is the strongest player domestically, and a computer genius. His dream is to win the worldwide championship with his teammates.

=== Mi Shaofei (Xiao Mi) ===
Portrayed by Li Hongqi

Mi Shao Fei (Xiao Mi) is the original solo team all-rounder, the team was disbanded to go home to take care of the kiosk, then invited by Wang Hao to make a comeback, but announced his retirement due to unsatisfactory results, and finally became the leader of the K&K team.

=== Wang Hao (Solo) ===
Portrayed by Li zefeng

Wang Hao was the original SOLO team captain, and Han Shangyan was his good brother, aspiring to win the CTF championship for China. But ten years ago Wang Hao chose to leave the team because of the sudden appearance of his ex-girlfriend Su Cheng with his daughter Ai, and Han Shangyan announced his retirement and the SOLO team was disbanded. However, Han Shangyan began to melt because of Tong Nian's appearance, and the relationship between Wang Hao and Han Shangyan also changed in the constant cooperation, and eventually reconciled.

=== Su Cheng ===
Portrayed by Wang Lejun

Su Cheng was the first love of the former SOLO team captain Wang Hao. The two eventually broke up because of their feelings, but Su Cheng secretly gave birth to her daughter Xiao Ai, and then gave her daughter to Wang Hao for raising because she cannot afford her daughter any more. Later, she became the leader of the Han Shangyan Club K & K, and founded the K & K Club China Branch with Han Shangyan.

=== Ai Qing (Appledog) ===
Portrayed by Wang Zhener

Ai Qing is the ex -girlfriend of the SOLO team captain Wang Hao, and just like Han Shangyan, Xiao Mi, Ou Qiang, and Wang Hao, she is a member of SOLO. Due to the appearance of Wang Hao's illegitimate daughter, the relationship with Wang Hao finally withdrawn from the team, which led the Han Shangyan to retire, and the SOLO team indirectly disbanded. Han Shangyan's cousin Wu Bai likes Ai Qing.

=== Sun Yaya ===
Portrayed by Jiang Peiyao

Tong Nian's best friend. Mi Shaofei's girlfriend.

== Production ==
=== Development ===
It is reported that the K & K club shed has an area of more than 2,000 square meters, and the construction time took 1.5 months. There are training facilities, meeting rooms and other venues inside. It is equipped with dozens of professional competition equipment and includes all kinds of basic living facilities, strive to restore the real club environment in every detail. The crew also shot the live moments of the characters and the team through more than 100 live shots of the location. To cultivate teammates' team tacit understanding and deepen the actor's understanding of the role, before the shooting, the crew specially conducted closed performance training and professional skills training, which made the team atmosphere shown in the play harmonious.

=== Filming ===
Fang Ying, vice-president of Huace/Croton Media, whose Gcoo Entertainment arm produced Go Go Squid!, said the series was conceived in 2014 and took more than 20 weeks to shoot. Li revealed that he was filming in Hengdian, when the staff recommended the novel and script of Go Go Squid! to him. Li accepted the offer because he thought that the character has a lot in common with him, right perseverance in work and dreams, just like his attitude towards his career as an actor. When he first came on set for filming, he had hurt his back from Sword Dynasty production. He couldn't walk properly at the start of filming. The series began filming in April 2018 and finished on July 28, 2018, at Sanya.

=== Marketing ===
On February 14, 2018, officials announced that Yang Zi and Li as male and female protagonists. On March 19, 2018, Guan Xuanhu starred in one day, and Li Hongqi and Li Zefeng joined the play. On April 11, 2018, the full-length animated concept film was released followed by a still photo of the male and female protagonists On April 14, 2018. On May 20, 2018, the Honey Juice 520 Challenge was launched, and the actors in the show appeared separately. On June 11, 2018, the "dream as wings" version of the poster was exposed, and the image of the K & K team was presented to the audience for the first time followed by the personal posters of the characters On June 14, 2018. On July 14, 2018, the interview video of the male and female protagonists was released. On July 31, 2018, the first film flower officially released.

=== Design ===
The K & K team uniforms are also designed and customized by designers. There are more than ten types of uniforms. Han Shangyan's clothing is kept mainly black, simple, and elegant.

== Reception ==
=== Television ratings ===
CSM National Network TV Rating (Note: The ratings include CCTV. 16 provincial network only lists representative ratings)
Dragon TV
Pilot Episode	Final Episode	Peak	Average
0.41; July 9, 2019	0.96; July 31, 2019	0.96; July 31, 2019	0.62
Zhejiang TV
0.46; July 9, 2019	1.5; July 31, 2019	1.5; July 31, 2019	0.99

During the premiere broadcast of the series, the average ratings of the two stations were only 0.7%. However, Go Go Squid! topped television ratings in its timeslot.

The series dominated media data performance on the Guduo TV series list, Cat's Eye data TV series list, Yien Broadcasting Index TV series list, Yunhe Data series popularity list, Weibo TV series list, etc. During the launch of Go Go Squid!, Cateye Media Matrix released more than 200 related short videos on Douyin, and the cumulative playback reached more than 500 million. It generated a huge online buzz, with the show's official hashtag being viewed more than 12 billion times on Sina Weibo. According to the statistics of micro-hotspot wrd.cn, the TV series that first broadcast on TV stations and online video platforms in July 2019. The network transmission popularity index of TV series, main actors, and main characters from July 1 to July 31, Go Go Squid! ranked first in all categories; the hottest premiere TV series with network communication popularity index of 64.54; the hottest actors and actress (Li Xian and Yang Zi) with communication popularity index 55.73 and 53.06 respectively; as well as the hottest male and female character (Han Shangyan and Tong Nian) with communication popularity index 53.31 and 49.57. The series was also on the top of a poll conducted by The Beijing News on the most popular Chinese TV series of the summer, the results of which were published on July 31. According to iQiyi, the series is its second most popular show after last year's period drama and mega-hit, Story of Yanxi Palace. In 2019, the series was the most-streamed series in the three major video platforms; iQIYI, Tencent Video and Youku. According to the report data of the Cat's Eyes series, the series ranked first in the comprehensive search popularity list of the three major platforms of Baidu, Weibo and WeChat. And according to statistics from Yien Broadcasting Index TV series list, Go Go Squid! is the best domestic drama in 2019.

In Go Go Squid!, Han Shanyang is a male professional in the cybersecurity competition CTF (Internet Security Capture the Flag Station), which brought niche cybersecurity-related topics into public view. Chen Xiaoyuan the captain team of CTF admitted it, and praised Han Shanyang's positive energy for his perseverance, and struggle for dreams. And he found that the opening theme of the TV series is exactly what they feel like a real CTF player.

Following the popularity of the drama, major universities in China have started school one after another, and they have hung up the banners of Go Go Squid! to welcome the new students.

=== Critical response ===
Go Go Squid! received an average rating of 6.6/10 at Douban, and 7.8/10 at IMDb. New Bulletin[zh] described Li Xian's performance as 'generally praised' by netizens, but noted that he was also criticized for sluggish and muddled line delivery. Li Xian agreed that his lines were 'somewhat slow', noting that he had deliberately chosen such delivery for his character after consulting the filming team. Despite this, Li Xian still admitted that he felt these shortcomings when watching the drama.

Liu Wei of The Beijing News praised the show's setting for being different from past youth romance dramas. They noted that Go Go Squid! did not rely on common youth romance drama tropes like melodramatic plotlines, and did not force the common angsty car crash, memory loss, and terminal illness tropes into the plot to stir emotion in viewers.

In addition, Jia Miao of Xinhua News also praised the positive energy of the series, the way it tells all aspects of young people's lives in a simple but peaceful way, and the small details which inadvertently touched the audience. She is looking forward to more urban positive energy TV shows like Go Go Squid!.

Lili Pang of Xinhua News praised the actors for their vivid interpretation of the characters, especially Li's performance, writing "I feel that Li Xian is a boy with a lot of potential. The setting the characters are in means there are no explosive scenes and no famous scenes, but Li Xian's performance is still excellent. I got the impression from watching (Li Xian) that he could definitely handle playing more complicated and deep roles." People's Daily praised the three-dimensionality of the show's characters, the plot's rationality compared to the melodrama of other romance plots, and the show's depiction of youth in China.

=== Accolades ===
Award	Year	Category	Nominee(s)	Result	Ref.
Baidu Fudian Awards	2019	Top Ten Television Series	Go Go Squid!	Won	
Huading Awards	2019	Best Screenwriter	Mobao Feibao	Nominated	
Huading Awards	2019	Best New Actor	Li Xian	Nominated	
Huading Awards	2019	Best Actress (Modern drama)	Yang Zi	Won	
Huading Awards	2019	Best Television Series	Go Go Squid!	Nominated	
China College Students Television Festival	2019	Most Popular TV Drama OST	The Nameless Generation (Opening Theme Song)	Won	
China College Students Television Festival	2019	Best Drama	Go Go Squid!	Won	
China College Students Television Festival	2019	Best Actress	Yang Zi	Won	
China Entertainment Industry Summit (Golden Pufferfish Awards)	2019	Best Marketing	Go Go Squid	Nominated	
China New Entertainment New Consumer Annual Summit	2019	Drama of the Year	Go Go Squid!	Won	
China Quality TV Drama Awards	2021	All-Media Hit	Go Go Squid!	Won	
China Quality TV Drama Awards	2021	Quality Interpretation of Creativity Drama Star	Li Xian	Won	
China Quality TV Drama Awards	2021	Quality Shining Drama Star	Li XIan and Yang ZI	Won	
China Quality TV Drama Awards	2021	All-round Quality Drama Star	Yang Zi	Won	
Film and TV Role Model Annual Ranking	2019	Most Popular Actor	Li Xian	Won	
Film and TV Role Model Annual Ranking	2019	Most Popular Actress	Yang Zi	Won	
Esquire Man At His Best Awards	2019	Most Promising Actor of the Year	Li Xian	Won	
Golden Bud - Network Film And Television Festival	2019	Best Actor	Li Xian	Nominated	
Golden Bud - Network Film And Television Festival	2019	Best Actress	Yang Zi	Nominated	
GQ Men of the Year China	2019	Popular Actor of the Year	Li Xian	Won	
iQiyi All-Star Carnival	2019	TV series of the year	Go Go Squid!	Won	
iQiyi All-Star Carnival	2019	Scream King	Li Xian	Won	
iQiyi All-Star Carnival	2019	Scream Queen	Yang Zi	Won	
iQiyi All-Star Carnival	2019	Best Newcomer in a TV Series	Hu Yitian	Won	
iQiyi All-Star Carnival	2019	Best Newcomer in a TV Series	Jiang Peiyang	Won	
Sina Film & TV Award Ceremony	2019	Top Ten Television Series	Go Go Squid!	Shortlisted	
Sir Movie Cultural And Entertainment Industry Award	2019	Best Actress (Drama)	Yang Zi	Nominated	
Sir Movie Cultural And Entertainment Industry Award	2019	Best Couple	Yang Zi and Li Xian	Nominated	
Sohu Fashion Awards	2019	National Drama of the Year	Go Go Squid!	Nominated	
Sohu Fashion Awards	2019	National Drama Male Star of the Year	Li Xian	Nominated	
Tencent Video All Star Award	2019	Quality Actor of the Year	Li Xian	Won	
Tencent Video All Star Award	2019	Television Series of the Year	Go Go Squid!	Won	
Tencent Video All Star Award	2019	Best Newcomer in a TV Series	Yu Chengen	Won	
The Actors of China Award	2019	Outstanding Actor	Li Xian	Won	
The Actors of China Award	2019	Outstanding Actress	Yang Zi	Won	
The Actors of China Award	2019	Best Actor - Green Team	Li Xian	Nominated	
The Actors of China Award	2019	Best Actress - Green Team	Yang Zi	Nominated	
The Actors of China Award	2020	Best Actor - Green Team	Li Xian	Nominated	
The Actors of China Award	2020	Best Actor - Green Team	Hu Yitian	Nominated	
The Actors of China Award	2020	Best Actress - Green Team	Yang Zi	Nominated	
The Actors of China Award	2020	Outstanding Actor	Li Xian	Won	
The Actors of China Award	2020	Outstanding Actor	Hu Yitian	Won	
The Actors of China Award	2020	Outstanding Actress	Yang Zi	Won	
Weibo TV Series Awards	2019	Top Ten Most Popular Television Series	Go Go Squid!	Shortlisted	
Weibo TV Series Awards	2019	Top Ten Most Popular Actor	Li Xian	Shortlisted	
Weibo TV Series Awards	2019	Most Popular Actress	Yang Zi	Won	
Hengdian Film Festival of China - Wenrong TV Awards	2019	Best Television Series	Go Go Squid!	Nominated	
Hengdian Film Festival of China - Wenrong TV Awards	2019	Best Actor	Li Xian	Nominated	
Hengdian Film Festival of China - Wenrong TV Awards	2019	Best Actress	Yang Zi	Nominated	
Weibo Awards Ceremony	2020	Hot Drama of the Year	Go Go Squid!	Won	
Weibo Awards Ceremony	2020	Popular Actor of the Year	Li Xian	Won	
Weibo Awards Ceremony	2020	Popular Actress of the Year	Yang Zi	Won	

== Release ==
=== Broadcast ===
The series premiered from July 9, 2019, until July 31, 2019, and was broadcast simultaneously on Zhejiang TV, Dragon TV, iQiyi, and Tencent. Released on Netflix in February 2020, Indonesia, Thailand, India, Malaysia through We TV, other countries on Rakuten Viki, My Dramalist, as well as YouTube.

== Controversy ==
Early in the show's airing, many unbroadcasted episodes were leaked in their entirety. The leaked episodes contained watermarks that read "Only for viewing by Dragon TV ". Netizens left comments under Dragon TV's Weibo posts about the show asking the network to investigate, but Dragon TV had not responded as of August 2020.

The series was embroiled in a controversy after a map was seen in episode 39 that did not include Taiwan and Hainan Island as part of China. The map colored China blue but kept Taiwan and Hainan colorless, indicating they were not part of the country. According to the Ministry of Natural Resources, it also 'incorrectly' represented the India-China border, the South China Sea and the Kashmir region. According to the ministry, mistakes on the map used in the teleplay include that it incorrectly delineated the boundaries of the southern areas of the Tibet autonomous region, the colors for Taiwan and Hainan islands were different from other parts of China; and the dotted line to indicate Chinese islands in the South China Sea was missing. The issue has since been investigated by China's Ministry of Natural Resources. On August 12, the production company was fined RMB 100,000 (US$14,100) by Shanghai Municipality Planning and Natural Resources Bureau. Yang Zi forwarded her studio's Weibo post denying the rumors and added the caption "National sovereignty, unity and territorial integrity are inviolable. China: not even a bit can be left behind!"

== Soundtrack ==
"A Nameless Person" is the theme song of the drama. The song echoes the plot of Go Go Squid!, as in addition to telling love stories between couples, the TV series also tells a group of young people working hard for seemingly unremarkable dreams, occupations, and hobbies. Compared with national athletes and international superstars, e-sports players may be "unknown people," but this group of young people choose to ignore everyone's colored vision, insist on pursuing their dreams, and win glory for the country. The songs are composed by Tang Hanxiao.

"Couldn't Leave" is the only English-language song, sung by Kazakh singer Dimash. The lyrics are simple, but the love is profound. "So many times I wish I could leave", tells that someone in the play wants to give up, but because of a kind of power (in the play is a group of brothers working hard together), that person persevered. The singer sang freely, which made the audience worried.

Songs expressing love include "Milk Bread" and "The Happiness of Walking Together".

"Milk Bread," sung by Yang Zi, peaked at 2 on the Billboard China Social Chart. Li also participated in the soundtrack title "Give to the Future". The singing voice is similar to his interpretation of Han Shangyan, which is convergent and low-key, seemingly absent. Even when it comes to the climax in the play or song, it expresses everything with a calm and mature character. In the middle part of the song is a child's voice. The song peaked at 7 on Billboard China Social Chart and Billboard China Top 100.

No.	Title	Lyrics	Music	Singers	Length
1.	"A Nameless Person (无名之辈)" (Opening theme song)	Tang Hanxiao	Tang Hanxiao	Chen Xueran	4:23
2.	"Milk Bread (牛奶面包)" (Ending theme song)	Zheng Guofeng, Zhang Pengpeng	Zheng Guofeng	Yang Zi	3:28
3.	"Love Is Not Up To Me (爱不由我)"	Zhang Pengpeng	Zheng Guofeng	You Zhangjing	4:31
4.	"Give to the Future (給未來)"	Zhang Pengpeng	Zheng Guofeng	Li Xian	3:57
5.	"I Can Not Care About You (我可以不在乎你)"	Sun Aili	Sun Aili	Kimberley Chen	4:48
6.	"Couldn't leave"	Chen Xueran	Chen Xueran	Dimash Kudaibergen	3:14
7.	"Glory (光耀)"	Lin Qiao	Zhao Qian	Lara Veronin	3:10
8.	"The Happiness of Walking Together ( 一起走的幸福)"	Lin Qiao, Gao Ying	Gao Ying	Duan Aojuan	3:06
