= The Golden Eyes =

Chinese adventure-fantasy television series

- Official promotional poster
- Also known as: The Golden Pupil
- Genre: Adventure
- Based on: The Golden Eyes
- Written by: Dayan
- Directed by: Lin Nan
- Starring: Lay Zhang
- Country of origin: China
- Original language: Mandarin
- No. of seasons: 1
- No. of episodes: 56

Production
- Executive producer: Bai Yicong Yuanang
- Production location: China
- Running time: 45 minutes
- Production company: iQiYi

Original release
- Network: iQiYi
- Release: 26 February – 12 April 2019

The Golden Eyes (Chinese: 黄金瞳; pinyin: huáng jīn tóng) is a 2019 Chinese adventure-fantasy television series starring Lay Zhang, Wang Zixuan, and Wang Yuexin. It is based on the Mandarin novel of the same name, (Chinese: 黄金瞳) written by the Chinese author Dayan. It aired on iQiyi from 26 February 2019 until 12 April 2019.

== Synopsis ==
It is said that only individuals with the "spirit language" (言灵 in Chinese and Kotodama in Japanese) can possess a pair of Golden Eyes. Zhuang Rui (Lay Zhang) is a simple pawnshop worker when his life was changed forever by a new set of eyes after an accident. When Zhuang Rui's upgrade leads to special magical powers that let him see through everything, he decides to use them to get rich by joining auctions for gemstones and betting on precious antiques. Meanwhile, undercover police officer Miao Feifei (Wang Zixuan), who is suspicious of his actions, decides to tag along for further investigation. With his newly founded squad, Zhuang Rui searches for the secrets and mysteries behind the Golden Eyes, where he finds out that being bestowed with the magical gift leads to numerous consequences and an eventual death.

== Cast and characters ==
=== Main ===
- Lay Zhang as Zhuang Rui / Feng Quan

Zhuang Rui is a simple but trustful pawnshop assistant who gets his eyes mutated with the power of the Golden Eyes which let him see through everything, including things that are not visible with the naked eye. He later uses his special ability to analyze gemstones and artifacts. He is also a tomb raider. Throughout his adventure, he discovers that the Golden Eyes have deadly side effects to one's health after much usage and link to the disappearance of his grandfather, who was an archaeological professor that searched for Feng Quan's tomb. Feng Quan is the first person who obtained the Golden Eyes. He was a former soldier who gained the Golden Eyes and became a powerful and wealthy merchant during the Qin dynasty. In present day, Zhuang Rui and his friends were used by villains to track down Feng Quan's tomb in order to find out the secret behind the Golden Eyes.

- Wang Zixuan as Miao Feifei

a skilled undercover police officer who is observing Zhuang Rui for further investigation due to an incident. She soon gets involved in Zhuang Rui's plans and develops feelings for him.

- Wang Yuexin as Huangfu Yun

Zhaung Rui's adventurous best friend who desires to become rich. He also joins Zhuang Rui and Miao Feifei in missions.

- Meng A Sai as Peng Fei

A former special force soldier and former bodyguard of Xu Wei. He became good friends with Zhaung Rui and Huangfu Yun due to their kindness of helping others.

=== Supporting ===
- Esther Chen as Qin Xuanbing

Qin Haoran's adoptive daughter. Under her adoptive father's order she befriends Zhuang Rui and falls in love with him.

- Lee Li-Chun as De Shu/Ma Tengfeng

Professor of the history department of Beijing University, a famous master of legendary restoration in the antiques industry, a teacher of Zhuang Rui, and a teacher of Yi, who is very caring for Zhuang Rui. He was a guide of archaeological team led by Zhuang Rui's grandfather many years ago who became obsessed over the Golden Eyes. He tried to obtain them for personal gain. He is the villain mastermind behind Qin Haoran who is seeking the secrets of the Golden Eyes. He is the murderer of Gu Tianfeng.

- Hong Xuan as Liu Jia

Best friend of Miao Feifei and later girlfriend of Huangfu Yun.

- Shi Zhao Qi as Qin Haoran

Qin Yanbing's adoptive father, chairman of the Xihuang Jewelry Group. He tries to uncover the secret of the Golden Eyes along with De Shu/Ma Tengfeng by using Zhuang Rui to search for the location of Feng Quan's tomb. He murdered Qin Xuanbing's biological father, his business partner, because he was against working with De Shu/Ma Tengfeng. He disguised it as an assassination by her father's unknown business-related enemy as a cover up.

- Hong Jiantao as Ma Pangzi

A businessman who is interested in gemstones and artifacts. Zhuang Rui and Huangfu Yun befriend him in their adventure.

- Zhong Weilun as Liu Zhangfa
- Chen Yuwen as Xu Wei

The general manager of Xu's jewelry corporation, insidious and cunning. Tries to pursue Qin Xuanbing for business gained. Got arrested by the police for crimes he committed against Zhuang Rui and Qin Xuanbing. He is one of the first enemies that Zhuang Rui made after gaining the Golden Eyes.

- Chen Jin as Hu Rong

The chairman of Hu's Jewelry Group, Myanmar's emerald predator, who has the largest jade mine in Myanmar. Business rival of Qin Haoran.

- Tan Kai as Xu Zhendong

Xu's jewelry chairman, Xu Wei's uncle.

- Han Tongsheng as Gu Tianfeng

The chairman of the Jade Association, the grandfather of Gu Dingyu and best friend of Zhuang Rui's grandfather. He treated Zhuang Rui as his own grandson. He was murdered by De Shu/Ma Tengfeng for getting close to the truth behind the disappearance of Zhuang Rui's grandfather and his archaeological team in episode 35.

- Wang Wei as Professor Meng

An archaeological professor that Zhuang Rui came across in his adventures. She led an archaeological team in Gansu.

== Production ==
This drama series shares the same production team with Lay Zhang's previous 2016 television series, The Mystic Nine. Chief director, Ling Nan, has previously directed The Mystic Nine Side Story: Flowers Bloom in February while the production team includes Daomu Biji writer cum screenwriter of The Mystic Nine, Xu Lei and the producers of The Mystic Nine, Bai Yicong and Zhang Yuanang. This television series would be the producing team and Lay's second collaboration. The novel saw a digital sales of over 30 million downloads online.

=== Casting ===
A pre-release press conference was held on 17 September 2017 at the Phoenix International Media Center, Beijing where Lay Zhang was announced to be the male lead for the series. Posters for the television series were also unveiled during the pre-release press conference. The casting of the female lead became a trending topic for discussion on Sina Weibo soon after.

Lay Zhang officially signed the contract for the television series on stage with the director and producers of The Golden Eyes during his album premiere "2017 Lay Zhang Showcase" for his studio album Lay 02 Sheep which was held at the Beijing National Aquatics Center on 12 October.

=== Filming ===
Principal photography started with an opening ceremony on 12 January 2018 at Huairou District, Beijing. Filming also took place in Ukraine from 10 to 17 March and subsequently in Yunnan, Ningxia and Inner Mongolia. The cast crew sourced for locations four months ahead of filming and went through much trouble transporting equipment to remote locations due to harsh terrain. Filming for all 60 episodes took a total of 150 days.

== International broadcast ==
- In Malaysia, the drama will air on Astro Quan Jia HD.

== Original soundtrack ==
The Golden Eyes OST (黄金瞳 影视剧原声带)

Soundtrack album by Various artists
- Released: 2019
- Genre: Soundtrack
- Language: Chinese
- Label: Linghe Culture Media

Digital download (Note: There are two versions of "I Want to be The Only One In Your Eyes (我想成为你眼中的唯一)", one version by Gai Yujia and the other version by Yue Wang.)
No.	Title	Artist	Length
1.	"On My Way"	Yang Haoming ( of 挺齐全), Ding Li ( of 挺齐全), Hou Jinxi ( of 挺齐全)	04:35
2.	"Destiny Hits" (命运之瞳)	Gui Bian	01:34
3.	"My Little World" (我的小小世界)	Nanshan Qiumu	04:50
4.	"Only Love" (只有爱过)	Meng Asai	03:54
5.	"I Want to be The Only One In Your Eyes" (我想成为你眼中的唯一)	Gai Yujia	03:38
6.	"I Want to be The Only One In Your Eyes"	Yue Wang	03:38
7.	"Combine Into One" (合二为一)	Yue Wang	03:39
Total length:			25:53

== Awards and nominations ==
Year	Award	Category	Recipient	Result	Ref.
2019	14th Seoul International Drama Awards	Best Serial Drama	The Golden Eyes	Won	
2019	Golden Bud - The Fourth Network Film And Television Festival	Best Web Series	The Golden Eyes	Nominated	
2019	Golden Bud - The Fourth Network Film And Television Festival	Best Actor	Lay Zhang	Nominated	
2019	Golden Bud - The Fourth Network Film And Television Festival	Best Actress	Wang Zixuan	Nominated	
2019	15th Chinese American Film Festival	Best Director	Lin Nan	Won	
