= Zhang Ming'en =

Chinese actor

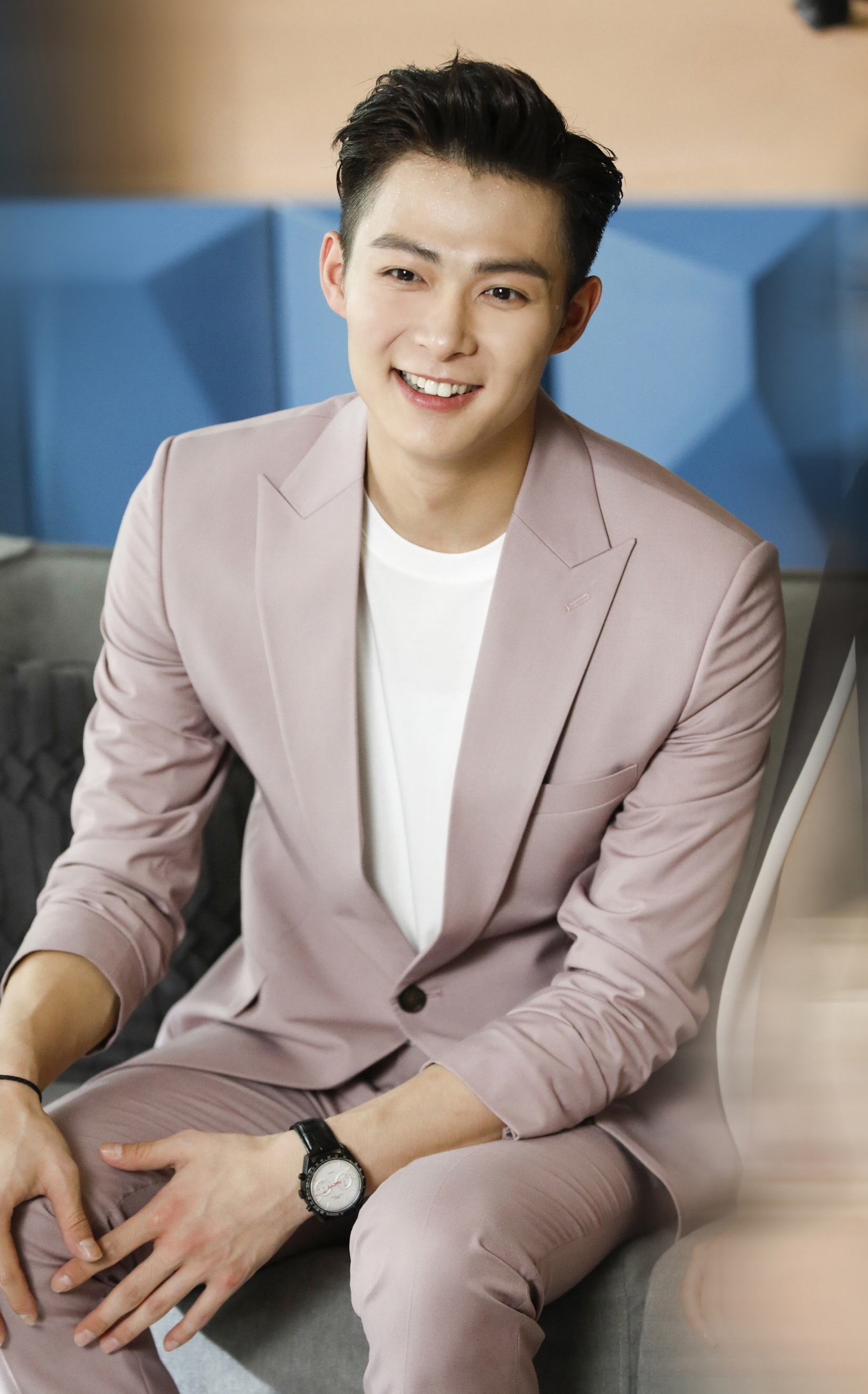
- Zhang in 2018
- Born: May 6, 1995 (age 31); Heilongjiang, China
- Education: Central Academy of Drama
- Occupation: Actor
- Years active: 2010–present
- Agent: Zhang Ming'en Studio (under Linghe Culture 灵河文化)

Chinese name
- Simplified Chinese: 张铭恩
Transcriptions

Zhang Ming'en (Chinese: 张铭恩, born 6 May 1995), is a Chinese actor. He made his official acting debut in 2016 with the tomb-raiding series The Mystic Nine. He has also acted in the series Tientsin Mystic and Nice to Meet You.

== Career ==
Zhang graduated from the prestigious Central Academy of Drama. During his school and early college days, he participated in some short films and a sitcom's bit part before officially debuting in 2016 with a memorable role as Adjutant Zhang Rishan in the tomb-raiding series The Mystic Nine. He went on to star in a spin-off of the series titled Tiger Bones Plum Blossom, which focuses on his character. In 2017, he acted in a highly acclaimed mystery fantasy web drama, Tientsin Mystic.

In 2018, Zhang reprised his role in the spin-off to The Mystic Nine, Tomb of the Sea. His performance was well-received by viewers and received acclaim. He was cast as the male protagonist for the first time in the romance supernatural drama, Destiny's Love.

In 2019, Zhang starred in the television series Nice to Meet You, the sequel to the 2017 hit drama Because of You. The same year, he starred in fantasy drama L.O.R.D. Critical World.

== Filmography ==
=== Film ===
Year	English title	Chinese title	Role	Notes
2015	Peppermint	薄荷		Short film
2016	The Mystic Nine Side Story: Tiger Bones Plum Blossom	老九门番外之虎骨梅花	Adjutant Zhang Rishan	Web film

=== Television series ===
Year	English title	Chinese title	Role	Network	Notes
2016	The Mystic Nine	老九门	Adjutant Zhang Rishan	Dragon TV	
2017	Tientsin Mystic	河神	Ding Mao	iQiyi	
2018	Tomb of the Sea	沙海	Zhang Rishan	Tencent	
2019	Destiny's Love	爱上北斗星男友	Chi Yu	iQiyi	
2019	Nice to Meet You	只为遇见你	Yu Zhi	Hunan TV	
2019	L.O.R.D. Critical World	爵迹·临界天下	Qi Ling	iQiyi	
2020	Tientsin Mystic 2	河神2	Ding Mao	iQiyi	
2020	Heroes in Harm’s Way	最美逆行者		CCTV	
2020	Ultimate Note	终极笔记	Zhang Rishan	iQiyi	
TBA	Snow Leopard 2	雪豹2			
TBA	Insect Totem	虫图腾	Pan Jun	Tencent	

=== Television show ===
Year	English title	Chinese title	Role	Notes
2019	Dream Space	恋梦空间	Cast member	
2019	Meeting Mr. Right	女儿们的恋爱	Cast member	with Xu Lu

== Discography ==
Year	English title	Chinese title	Album	Notes
2019	"Zhuo Mu"	拙慕	L.O.R.D. Critical World OST	

== Awards and nominations ==
Year	Award	Category	Nominated work	Result	Ref.
2016	6th iQiyi All-Star Carnival	Best New Actor	The Mystic Nine	Won	
2017	7th iQiyi All-Star Carnival	Best New Actor	Tientsin Mystic	Won	
2017	Belt and Road Initiative International Fashion Week: The Most Credible Award	Popular Actor Award	—N/a	Won	
2018	Golden Seagull International New Media Film Week	Most Popular Actor (Web series)	Tomb of the Sea	Won	
2019	Golden Bud - The Fourth Network Film And Television Festival	Best Actor	Nice to Meet You, Destiny's Love, L.O.R.D Critical World	Nominated	
2019	Lifestyle Awards	Most Watched Actor	—N/a	Won	
2020	7th The Actors of China Awards	Best Actor (Web series)	—N/a	Nominated	
