= Women in Shanghai =

- Title card
- Genre: Drama
- Written by: Wang Dan Liu; Zhang Xia; Gao Wen Mi; Xue Li Sha; Su Ming
- Directed by: Cheng Liang
- Starring: Wang Zhen Er; Toby Lee; Li Xian
- Opening theme: Where is She by Natalie Oliveri
- Country of origin: China
- Original language: Chinese
- No. of episodes: 20

Production
- Executive producer: Jing Qiang Fei
- Production location: China
- Running time: 25 minutes

Original release
- Network: Youku
- Release: May 8, 2018

Women in Shanghai (Chinese: 上海女子图鉴) is a 2018 Chinese streaming television series. Directed by Cheng Liang stars Wang Zhen Er, Li Cheng Bin and Li Xian. The series premiered on Youku on May 8, 2018.

== Plot summary ==
The story of a girl who comes from a small-town decides to stay in Shanghai after graduation and work her way up to become the top 10% of the population.

== Casts ==
- Wang Zhen Er as Luo Haiyan
- Li Chengbin as Zhang Tianhao
- Li Xian as Chen Xiaowei
- Sheng Yi Lun as Yan Bing
- Yuan Wen Kang as Yang Chengyuan
- Joe Ma as Cai Zhongxian
- Yao Lu as Lin Li
- Guan Xin as Niu Dameng
- Tie Wei Guang as Bai Qiang
- Liu Mei as Si Jiali
- Jin Sha as Xu Xiao
- Ma Xin Yi as Lu Manni
