= Wang Zixuan =

Chinese actress

- Born: November 12, 1992 (age 33); Xichang, Sichuan, China
- Other names: Xia Tian, Cici
- Occupation: Actress
- Years active: 2015–present

Wang Zixuan (Chinese: 王紫璇; born 12 November 1992) is a Chinese actress known for her role as Gu Ying in the web drama Tientsin Mystic (2017).

== Early life ==
Wang Zixuan was born in Xichang, Sichuan Province, China. She began to study ballet since childhood. She entered the Central Academy of Drama in 2010, majoring in performing arts.

== Career ==
In 2015, Wang debuted in the TV series Men., playing a girl who ran an online shop. In the same year, she starred alongside Zhou Dongyu and Sun Honglei in the comedy film The Ark of Mr. Chow, portraying a "campus goddess".

In 2016, Wang starred in the historical romance drama Princess Jieyou. Then she starred alongside Chen Kun and Bai Baihe in the comedy film Chongqing Hot Pot. She also played a female college student in the youth drama So Young, based on the novel of the same name by Xin Yiwu. In the same year, Wang starred alongside Jiang Jinfu and Yuan Bingyan in the costume drama Royal Highness.

In 2017, Wang starred as the lead female role, "Little Godly Woman (小神婆)" in the fantasy suspense web drama Tientsin Mystic, an adaptation of novel He Shen written by Tianxia Bachang. The series was a hit and contributed to her rise in popularity.

In 2018, Wang was cast in the fantasy adventure drama The Golden Eyes as the female lead. The same year, she was cast as one of the lead roles in the period drama The Eight. Wang is set to reprise her role in the second season of Tientsin Mystic.

== Filmography ==
=== Film ===
Year	English title	Chinese title	Role	Notes
2015	The Ark of Mr. Chow	少年班	Jiang Yilin	
2016	Chongqing Hot Pot	火锅英雄	Manager Zhang	
2021	The Yinyang Master	侍神令	Snow Girl	
2023	Faces in the Crowd	暴风	Zhu Jun	

=== Television series ===
Year	English title	Chinese title	Role	Notes
2015	Secret Society of Men - Friends	男人帮朋友	Shen Qing	
2016	So Young	致青春	Li Weijuan	
2016	Princess Jieyou	解忧公主	Princess Jing Jun	
2017	Tientsin Mystic	河神	Gu Ying	Main role
2018	Royal Highness	回到明朝当王爷之杨凌传	Ma Lianer	
2019	The Golden Eyes	黄金瞳	Miao Feifei	Main role
2020	The Eight	民初奇人传	Zhong Yao	Main role
2020	Tientsin Mystic 2	河神2	Gu Ying	Main role
2021	Pride and Price	盛装	Liu Ziqi	
2021	New Generation: Emergency Rescue	我们的新时代: 紧急营救	Mumu	
2021	Love Is Beautiful	对你的爱很美	Mei Mei	

== Discography ==
Year	English title	Chinese title	Album	Notes/Ref.
2019	"Starry Sea"	星辰大海		For China Movie Channel Young Actors Project with 31 other actors

== Awards ==
Year	Award	Category	Nominated work	Results	Ref.
2008	Australian International Ballet Competition Award				
2011	Miss Beijing Division 30 Strong and The Best Talent Award				
2011	The Sixth Xichang "Moon Daughter" Competition Final Champion				
2017	6th iQiyi All-Star Carnival	Best Newcomer	Tientsin Mystic	Won	
2017	4th The Actors of China Award Ceremony	Best Actress (Web series)	Tientsin Mystic	Won	
2018	10th China TV Drama Awards	New Generation Web Actor Award	Tientsin Mystic	Won	
2019	Golden Bud - The Fourth Network Film And Television Festival	Best Actress	The Golden Eyes	Nominated	
