= Singing When We're Young =

- Theatrical release poster
- Simplified Chinese: 初恋未满
- Hanyu Pinyin: Chūliàn wèi mǎn
- Directed by: Liu Juan
- Screenplay by: Liu Juan
- Story by: Yu Yonggan
- Produced by: Andy Lau; Fu Jia.
- Starring: Zhang Hanyun; Ran Xu; Dai Xu as Luo Fan
- Cinematography: Wang Boxue
- Edited by: Kong Jinlei
- Music by: Chris Babida
- Distributed by: Beijing Dejun Entertainment (CJ), Dongyang Qiushuitang Film & TV (CN)
- Release date: July 4, 2013
- Running time: 105 minutes
- Country: China
- Language: Chinese Mandarin

Singing When We're Young (Chinese: 初恋未满; pinyin: Chūliàn wèi mǎn) is a 2013 Chinese youth film, produced by Andy Lau, is the director's debut of Liu Juan. The film was shortlisted in the "Asian Newcomer Award" unit of the 16th Shanghai International Film Festival, and won a special jury award. Released in China on July 4, 2013.

== Plot ==
In 1997, the senior 3 class flower Dong Chirp (Zhang Hanyun) appears to be a sensible girl, but her heart is rebellious. Her good sister, Han Xia, likes fashion design very much. She is straightforward and dare to do things on weekdays, but because of her burly figure, ordinary appearance, and the personality of the men, she is often laughed at by the boys around her. The melancholy school grass Xia Jinghan (ran Xu), school bully Luo Fan (dai Xu), fat little Xiaoqiang (Zhang Zheng), and sports boy Dawei (Li Xian) are the school's recognized friends. Facing the upcoming college entrance examination, they each look forward to their future lives. Chiu's father died suddenly on her eighteenth birthday, but the birthday gift left to her became her permanent spiritual sustenance. Jing Han was righteous for others. Due to the divorce of his parents in his childhood, he and his grandmother lived together. Luo Fan is Jinghan's best buddy. They admire each other's chivalrous temperament, but the love between Jinghan and tweeting has caused the brothers to look back. The ordinary Han Xia has always lived in the shadow of a good sister's tweeting. The huge contrast between her teacher and classmates' attitude towards her and tweeting has caused a huge crisis of their friendship.

== Cast ==
- Zhang Hanyun as Dong Jiujiu
- Ran Xu as Xia Jinghan/Hanhan
- Dai Xu as Luo Fan
- Wu Yuyao as Han Xia
- Zhang Zheng as Xiaoqiang/Wet Crotch/Diaper
- Li Xian as Li Wei
- Ni Dahong as Jiujiu's father
- Wang Jinsong as school security guard
- Song Xiaoying as Xia Jinghan's grandmother
- Pan Jie as Dong Jiujiu's mother
- Wang Yanhui as Luo Fan's father
- Qi Long as Hunhun
- Li Qingke as Zhou Yunkai (student)
- Lu Qian as Xiaoke (student)
- Chris Babida as music judge

== Reception ==
- Chinese Young Generation Film Forum 2013 for Best Actor - Xu Dai
- Shanghai International Film Festival 2013 for Asian New Talent Award - Juan Liu
- Asian New Talent Award for Best Film (nominee)
