= Who Sleeps My Bro =

2016 Chinese film

- Poster
- Chinese: 睡在我上铺的兄弟
- Directed by: Stephen Zhang
- Written by: Stephen Zhang; Chen Qi An; Zhou Ben; Su Yang
- Produced by: Peggy Li
- Starring: Chen Xiao; Qin Lan; Calvin Tu; Wayne Liu; Li Xian
- Edited by: Jessie Zhang
- Production companies: Le Vision Pictures (Beijing); Beijing Weiying Shidai Technology
- Distributed by: Le Vision Pictures (Beijing)
- Release date: April 1, 2016
- Running time: 95 minutes
- Country: China
- Language: Mandarin
- Box office: US$20.06 million

Who Sleeps My Bro (pinyin: Shuì zài wǒ shàng pù de xiōngdì) is a 2016 Chinese coming-of-age comedy-drama film directed by Zhang Qi, starring Chen Xiao, Qin Lan, Calvin Tu, Liu Ruilin and Li Xian and based on a 2001 song. It was released in China by Le Vision Pictures on April 1, 2016.

== Cast ==
- Chen Xiao
- Qin Lan
- Calvin Tu
- Liu Ruilin
- Li Xian
- Yu Xintian
- Lan Yingying
- Jiang Xueming
- Wang Xiaokun

== Reception ==
The film grossed US$3.7 million on its opening day and US$10.53 million on its opening weekend in China. The film earned a total gross of US$20.06 million.
