= Four Ladies (TV series) =

Chinese television series

- Official Poster
- 翩翩冷少俏佳人
- Based on: Pride and Prejudice by Jane Austen
- Written by: Yu Meng; Chen Shuo
- Directed by: Qiao Liang
- Starring: Pan Zhilin; Xu Zhengxi; Li Xian; Zhu Zixiao; He Jing
- Opening theme: Mood for Love by Feng Lin Houshan
- Ending theme: Pear Blossom Fragrance by Feng Lin Houshan
- Country of origin: China
- Original language: Chinese Mandarin
- No. of seasons: 1
- No. of episodes: 30

Production
- Producer: Nian Mo Yi Jian
- Running time: 45 Minutes

Original release
- Release: May 22, 2016 – February 5, 2018

Four Ladies is a 2016 Chinese television series directed by Qiao Liang, starring Pan Zhilin, Xu Zhengxi, Li Xian, Zhu Zixiao, and He Jing.

== Plot ==
The Jane family is a family of deceased squires in the Republic of China. The four daughters have different personalities. Mrs. Jane's biggest wish is to marry her daughters and to worry about food and clothing. The arrival of the wealthy family Ding Zihui and Song Wenxi caused a war between sons and daughters in the town where the Jane family was. Although Song Wenxi had "sexual relations" with his second daughter Ru Tian several times, he found himself falling in love unconsciously. Cheng Biluo, who saved Wen Xi's life at that time, loved Wen Xi deeply, in order to prevent Wen Xi and Ru Tian from forming an alliance with Wen Xi's Qiu family Liu Tianyu. Tianyu did his best to Ru Tian. At the critical moment of Tianyu's proposal, Wenxi appeared, exposing Tianyu's abduction of Wenxuan who cause her pregnancy, such as Tian wakening up. Tianyu framed Wenxi, causing his career to be hit hard and imprisoned. For example, Tian Tian used his ingenuity to find evidence of Wenxi ’s innocent victimization. Wenxi calmed down his career, and his lovers eventually became dependents.

== Production ==
In order to create the characters in the play, the crew added modern design elements in addition to the inherent style of the Republic of China era.

== Soundtrack ==
No.	Title	演唱	Length
1.	"Mood for Love" (opening theme)	Feng Lin Houshan
2.	"Pear Blossom Fragrance" (end theme)	Feng Lin Houshan

== Cast ==
- Xu Zhengxi
- Li Xian
- Pan Zhilin
- Zhu Zixiao
- He Jing
- Yang Qing
- Liao Xueqiu
- Zhao Siyuan

== Production ==
Shooting Time October 2014-January 2015.
