= Chen Linong =

Taiwanese singer and actor

- 陳立農
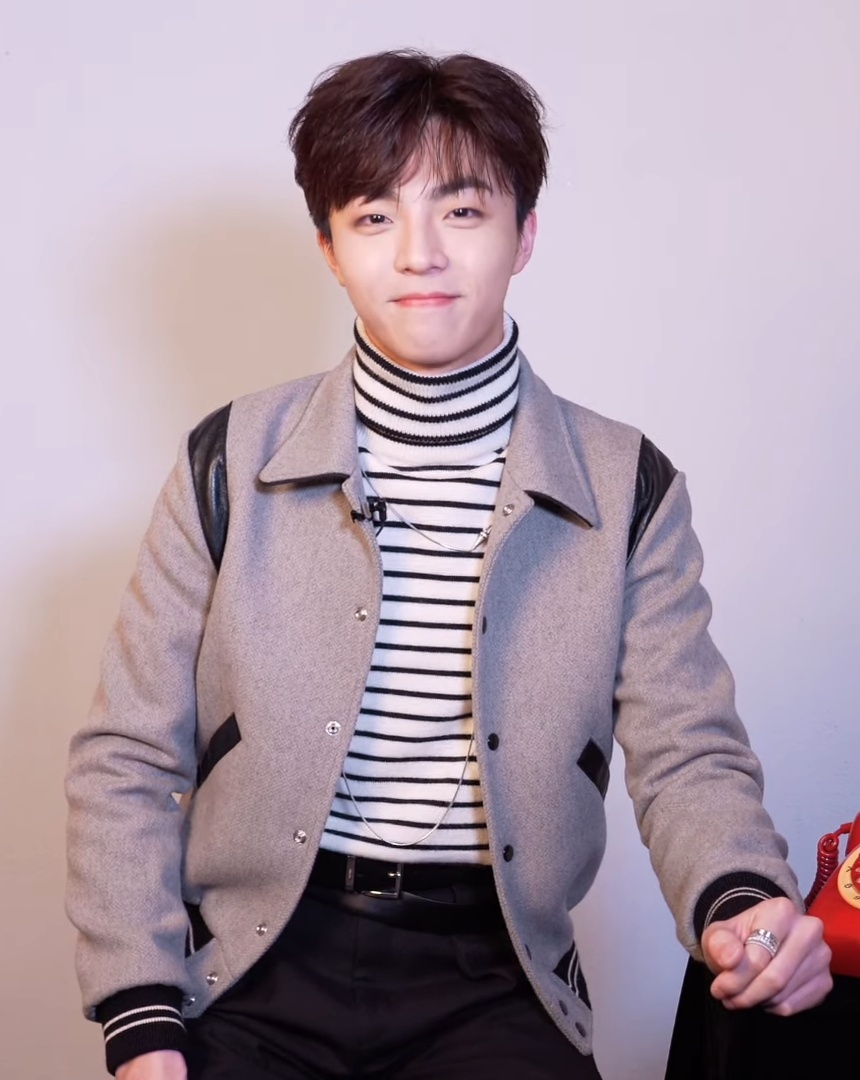
- Chen in 2019
- Born: October 3, 2000 (age 26); Kaohsiung, Taiwan
- Other name: Nong Nong
- Occupations: Singer; actor
- Years active: 2018–present
- Musical career
- Genre: C-pop
- Instrument: Vocals
- Labels: A Legend Star; Universal Music
- Formerly of: Nine Percent

Chen Linong
- Traditional Chinese: 陳立農
- Simplified Chinese: 陈立农
Transcriptions
Standard Mandarin
- Hanyu Pinyin: Chén Lì Nóng
- Wade–Giles: Ch'ên2 Li4 Nung2
Yue: Cantonese
- Jyutping: Can4 Laap6 Nung4
Southern Min
- Hokkien POJ: Tân Li̍p-lông

Chen Linong (simplified Chinese: 陈立农; traditional Chinese: 陳立農; Pe̍h-ōe-jī: Tân Li̍p-lông, born October 3, 2000) is a Taiwanese singer and actor. He is best known for being a member of the Chinese boy group Nine Percent after ranking 2nd place in the Chinese survival show Idol Producer. He debuted as a soloist following the release of his first single "我是你的 (I'm Yours)" in 2018. His solo album Unbelonging was released on May 29, 2020.

== Personal life ==
Chen was born in Kaohsiung, Taiwan where he was scouted by A Legend Star Entertainment Corp. and trained for a period of 6 months before travelling to mainland China.

== Career ==
=== 2018–2019: Idol Producer, Nine Percent, and solo debut ===
In 2018, Chen represented A Legend Star Entertainment Corp. on the reality survival show Idol Producer for a chance to debut in a boy group. Chen finished 2nd overall and debuted on April 6, 2018 as a member of Nine Percent with their first extended play, To the Nines.

After the program came to an end, Chen made his solo debut following the release of the single "我是你的 (I'm Yours)" on October 3, 2018.

=== 2020–present: First full length album and film role ===
Following the disbandment of Nine Percent on October 6, 2019, Chen released his first full-length album Unbelonging (格格不入) on May 29, 2020. The album contains 12 songs, two being collaborations with fellow singers, Hailee Steinfeld, and Lala Hsu. Since its release it has been confirmed to have achieved a double diamond certification by QQ Music, with over 500,000 albums sold on the platform. An official UMGC press release stated that the album "reached diamond status within one-minute of release", generating more than 4.5 million individual track sales within its first 12 hours on sale.

On December 4, 2020, Chen acted in Soul Snatcher where he played the lead role of Wang Zijin, alongside Li Xian. The movie earned $19,500,000 at the Chinese box office.

== Discography ==
=== Albums ===
Title	Album details	Sales
Unbelonging (格格不入)	Released: May 29, 2020; Label: UMG; Formats: Digital download, streaming; Track listing: 1. This is How I Feel You (我梦见你); 2. Unbelonging (格格不入); 3. Unsure feat. Lala Hsu (一无所知 feat.徐佳瑩); 4. Masterpiece (Chinese Ver.) (万分之一); 5. Lost In You (温柔时空); 6. Unmask (卸妆卸装); 7. Taste Of Summer (夏日滋味); 8. Shoulda, Woulda, Coulda (早该知道); 9. The Last Chapter (最后章节); 10. My Fantasy (统计学改); 11. I Was Yours（曾经男孩）; 12. Masterpiece feat. Hailee Steinfeld	CHN: 718,805
By the Name of Youth Scene II: Tears (青春为名下部曲-泪)	Released: August 19, 2024; Label: Warner Music China; Formats: Digital download, streaming; Track listing: 1. By the Name of Youth (青春为名); 2. Love Again (爱回去); 3. Compromise (委曲求全); 4. Tears of Remembrance (明天会忘了谁的眼泪); 5. September (九月); 6. No Tears in Paradise (天堂没有眼泪)	

=== Singles ===
Title	Year	Peak chart positions	Sales	Album
Title	Year	CHN TME (Note: The Billboard China Top 100 was launched in January 2019 by Billboard China but was shut down in September 2019 so QQ Music's Mainland Chart has been used. Billboard's China TME UNI chart has been used to list singles that were released after November, 2022.)	Sales	Album
"我是你的" (I'm Yours)	2018	2	CHN: 2,159,603	Non-album single
"一半是我" (Half Of It Is Me)	2019	3	CHN: 2,862,784	Non-album single
"专属合约"	2019	10	—N/a	Non-album single
"格格不入" (Unbelonging)	2020	2	—N/a	Unbelonging
"幸福特写" (A Close-Up of Happiness)	2020	12	—N/a	Non-album single
"桃浦男孩" (Taopu Boy)	2020	10	CHN: 246,348	Non-album single
"BEST造就王者"	2020	32	—N/a	Non-album single
"小小花朵 (Flower)"	2021	36	—N/a	Non-album single
"千万星火" (Ten Million Stars and Flames)	2021	27	—N/a	Non-album single
"青春的酸也很甜 (Yogurt Love)"	2021	24	—N/a	Non-album single
"今晚嫁给我吧 (Marry me tonight)"	2021	—	—N/a	Non-album single
"敬长大 (Grown)"	2021	62	—N/a	Non-album single
"不散 (See You There)"	2021	24	—N/a	Non-album single
"日心说 (Heliocentrism)"	2021	89	CHN: 146,367	Non-album single
"我愿全速奔向你"	2021	33	—N/a	Non-album single
"唯一的你"	2022	26	—N/a	Non-album single
"此时明月"	2022	—	—N/a	Non-album single
"他们都不懂"	2022	20	—N/a	Non-album single
"—" denotes releases that did not chart or were not released in that region.

=== Other charted songs ===
Title	Year	Peak chart positions	Album
Title	Year	CHN TME	Album
"我梦见你" (This Is How I Feel About You)	2020	2	Unbelonging
"最后章节" (The Last Chapter)	2020	100	Unbelonging
"曾经男孩" (I Was Yours)	2020	98	Unbelonging
"夏日滋味" (Taste Of Summer)	2020	93	Unbelonging
"Masterpiece (Feat. Hailee Steinfeld)"	2020	62	Unbelonging
"一无所知 (Feat. 徐佳莹)" (Unsure (Feat. Lala Hsu))	2020	49	Unbelonging
"—" denotes releases that did not chart or were not released in that region.

=== Collaborations ===
Title	Year	Peak chart positions	Album
Title	Year	CHN TME	Album
"无限奇迹" (They Don't Know) With 张羽涵 (Leezi Zhang) and Joysaaaa	2022	96	Non-album single
"—" denotes releases that did not chart or were not released in that region.

=== Soundtrack appearances ===
Title	Year	Peak chart positions	Album
Title	Year	CHN TME	Album
"Reborn" (解码游戏)	2018	—	Reborn OST
"Hi Roommate" (Hi室友)	2018	—	Hi Roommate OST
"There's a Dream" (有梦可待)	2019	10	Behind The Scenes OST
"A Glorious Future" (前程似锦) (with Li Xian)	2019	6	Soul Snatcher OST
"闪电起航" (with Liu Xiang, Tian Liang, Silence Wang, Yumiko Cheng and Xu Jiaqi)	2020	—	XJR Sports Carnival OST
"年少無邪" (with Li Xian)	2020	—	Soul Snatcher OST
"路"	2022	—	Chasing the Undercurrent OST
"唯一的你"	2022	26	PUBG: Game For Peace OST
"—" denotes releases that did not chart or were not released in that region.

== Filmography ==
=== Films ===
Year	English title	Native title	Role	Notes	Ref.
2020	Red Fox Scholar (Soul Snatcher)	赤狐书生	Wang Zijin		
2021	A Girl from Afar	最美表演	Himself	Short Film	

=== Television shows ===
Year	English title	Native title	Role
2018	Idol Producer	偶像练习生	Contestant
2018	Hi! Roommate	Hi室友	Cast Member
2018	Perfect Restaurant	完美的餐厅	Cast Member
2019	Miss Voice	这样唱好美	Judge
2019	More Than Forever	限定的记忆	Cast Member
2020	Dancing Diamond 52	菱格世代	Mentor
2020	Wonderful Time	美好的时光	Cast member
2020	XJR Sports Carnival	小巨人运动会	Cast member
2021	The Irresistible	牛气满满的哥哥	Cast member

== Awards and nominations ==
Year	Award	Category	Nominated work	Result	Ref
2018	2018 Bazaar Men of The Year Gala	Idol Of The Year	—N/a	Won	
2018	Fan Carnival Awards	Cooking Blogger Award	—N/a	Won	
2018	Baidu Awards	Baidu Entertainment Popularity Award	—N/a	Won	
2018	Baidu and Hunan TV party	Male Artist of The Year	—N/a	Won	
2019	Sina Fashion Awards	Most Commercially Valuable Artist of the Year	—N/a	Won	
2019	Night of the Film	Most Anticipated New Actor	—N/a	Won	
2019	Jinri Toutiao Awards Ceremony	Trendy Artist of the Year	—N/a	Won	
2020	Weibo Awards Ceremony	Rising Artist of the Year	—N/a	Won	
2021	2nd Tencent Music Entertainment Awards	Best Emerging Singer	—N/a	Won	
2021	2nd Tencent Music Entertainment Awards	Singer with the Most Potential	—N/a	Won	
