= Feng Shui (2012 film) =

- Theatrical release poster
- Directed by: Wang Jing
- Screenplay by: Nan Wu
- Based on: Fang Fang
- Produced by: Jennifer Dong; Fei Xie
- Starring: Yan Bingyan; Gang Jiao; Chen Gang; Li Xian
- Cinematography: You-Nian Liu
- Edited by: Wen Feng
- Release date: 16 November 2012
- Running time: 120 minutes
- Country: China
- Language: Chinese

Feng Shui (Chinese: 万箭穿心) is a 2012 Chinese film directed by Wang Jing.

== Casts ==
=== Main casts ===
- Yan Bingyan as Li Baoli
- Jong Ming-Kiah as Johnny

=== Supporting casts ===
- Gang Chen as Jianjian
- Minglan He as Ma Xuewu's mother
- Gang Jiao as Ma Xuewu
- Li Xian as Xiaobao, 18 years old
- Moxi Wang as Zhou Fen
- Tiange Wang as Xiaobao, 8 years old
- Qian Zhao as Wan Xiaojing

== Awards and nominations ==
| Award | Category | Individual | Result |
|---|---|---|---|
| Youth Film Handbook's Top-10 Chinese Films of the Year | Best Film | Wang Jing | Won |
| Youth Film Handbook's Top-10 Chinese Films of the Year | Best Actress | Yan Bingyan | Won |
| 4th China Film Director's Guild Awards | Best Film | Wang Jing | Nominated |
| 4th China Film Director's Guild Awards | Actress of the Year | Yan Bingyan | Won |
| 第四届中国影协杯优秀电影剧本奖 | 优秀剧本 | Wu Nan | Won |
| 3rd Beijing International Film Festival | Best Film | Wang Jing | Nominated |
| 3rd Beijing International Film Festival | Best Actress | Yan Bingyan | Won |
| 第13届数字电影 百合奖 | | | Won-一等奖 |
| 第13届数字电影 百合奖 | Outstanding Screenwriter | Wu Nan | Won |
| 第13届数字电影 百合奖 | Outstanding Actress | Yan Bingyan | Won |
| 第22届 上海影评人奖 | 年度十佳影片 | | Won |
| 第13届 华语电影传媒大奖 | Best Film | | Nominated |
| 第13届 华语电影传媒大奖 | Best Director | Wang Jing | Nominated |
| 第13届 华语电影传媒大奖 | Best Screenwriter | Wu Nan | Nominated |
| 第13届 华语电影传媒大奖 | Best Actress | Yan Bingyan | Won |
| 第13届 华语电影传媒大奖 | Best Supporting Actor | Jiao Gang | Nominated |
| 29th Golden Rooster Awards | Best Director | Wang Jing | Nominated |
| 29th Golden Rooster Awards | Best Screenwriter | Wu Nan | Nominated |
| 29th Golden Rooster Awards | Best Actress | Yan Bingyan | Nominated |
| 29th Golden Rooster Awards | Best Supporting Actor | Jiao Gang | Nominated |
| 29th Golden Rooster Awards | Best Sound Recording | Wang Changrui | Nominated |
| 29th Golden Rooster Awards | Best Music | Yang Sili | Nominated |
| 29th Golden Rooster Awards | Best Low-Budget Feature Film | | Won |
| 2013 China International Film Festival London | Best Film (Golden Knight Award) | | Won |
| 2013 China International Film Festival London | Best Actress | Yan Bingyan | Won |
| 2013 China International Film Festival London | Best Art Design | | Won |
| 15th Huabiao Awards | Outstanding Feature Film | | Won |
| 15th Huabiao Awards | Outstanding Actress | Yan Bingyan | Won |
