= Love Song 1980 =

2020 romance drama film directed by Mei Feng

- Theatrical release poster
- Simplified Chinese: 恋曲1980
- Hanyu Pinyin: Liàn qū 1980
- Directed by: Mei Feng
- Screenplay by: Mei Feng; Li Yunlei
- Based on: The Lover in 1980 by Yu Xiaodan
- Produced by: Song Yang; Xin Zheng
- Starring: Li Xian; Chun Xia
- Cinematography: Zhu Jinjing
- Music by: Zbigniew Preisner
- Production company: Fangcaodi Pictures
- Distributed by: Parallax Films
- Release date: October 31, 2020 (Tokyo International Film Festival)
- Running time: 127 minutes
- Country: China
- Language: Chinese Mandarin

Love Song 1980 (Chinese: 恋曲1980; pinyin: Liàn qū 1980) is a 2020 Chinese romantic drama film written directed by Mei Feng, starring Li Xian and Chun Xia. Won the best film award in the "Developing Film Project" section of the 3rd Pingyao International Film Festival and was once again nominated for the 33rd Tokyo International Film Festival - "Tokyo Premiere 2020" unit. The film is adapted from Yu Xiaodan’s novel The Lover in 1980. It tells the story of young people in the 1980s, facing the fate of the times and social waves, using love as a guide, and seeking spiritual truth.

== Plot ==
Set in Beijing during the early 1980s, Zheng Wu and Zheng Wen are brothers in their twenties, living their most vibrant and youthful years. Zheng Wu takes his classmates and younger brother, Zheng Wen out for dinner, in which he introduces Mao Zhen and her best friend, Feng Siyi. Zheng Wen becomes enamored of Mao Zhen, an amicable, outgoing, and mystic young woman.

Zheng Wu accidentally drowns in a lake and dies. Anguished from this loss, Zhengwen enters university and catches up with Mao Zhen. During the four years, Zheng Wen meets the romantic and talented Lao Chai, the passionate Tan Lili who embraces love and life, as well as Cheng Qing, a hair salon owner. Upon graduation, Zhengwen ventures to the desolate Inner Mongolia, his mother's hometown, to experience the other side of life. A surprise visit from Tan Lili rejuvenates Zheng Wen, yet a sudden phone call completely changes his life, Zhengwen decides to stay.

== Cast ==
- Li Xian
- Jessie Li

== Production ==
Fangcao Film and Television officially held the opening ceremony of the filming in Beijing on September 28, 2018. They announced the crew will be filmed in Beijing, Dalian, Inner Mongolia and Sichuan. The shooting period is 2 months.

The production team is rigorous in scenes, clothing, props, etc., trying to restore a Beijing in the 1980s.

== Release ==
Love Song 1980 was worldwide premiere at Tokyo International Film Festival. The film was the opening night film at the 3rd Hainan Island International Film Festival where it won Audience Choice Award for Best Feature-Fiction Length Film.

== Accolades ==
Award	Year	Category	Nominee(s)	Result	Ref.
Pingyao International Film Festival	2019	Film Project in Development (WIP) Huayi Brothers Best Film	Love Song 1980	Won	
Tokyo International Film Festival	2020	Worldwide Premiere	Love Song 1980	Nominated	
Tallinn Black Nights Film Festival	2020	Best Director	Mei Feng	Nominated	
Hainan Island International Film Festival	2020	Audience Choice Award - Featured Fiction Film	Love Song 1980	Won	
