= City of Fantasy =

Chinese 2014 television series

- Official Poster
- Also known as: 奇妙世纪
- Genre: Love; Suspense; Thriller; Fantasy
- Written by: Lin Bo; Hu Ting; Li Zhonglun; Li Qianxi
- Directed by: heng Liang; Limbo
- Starring: Huang Jue, Nan Sheng, and Li Xian
- Country of origin: China
- Original language: Mandarin
- No. of seasons: 1
- No. of episodes: 8

Production
- Producer: Wu Jinzhi
- Running time: 20 minutes
- Production company: Youku

Original release
- Release: October 21, 2014

City of Fantasy (Chinese: 奇妙世纪; pinyin: Qímiào shìjì) China's first original urban fantasy unit drama co-created by crying film and television and produced by Youku. Directed by Heng Liang and Limbo, starring Huang Jue, Nan Sheng, and Li Xian.

== Casts and Characters ==
=== Zhang wen ===
Portrayed by Huang Jue, cool black super, chic trench coat. Zhang Wen is a psychiatrist with a strong curiosity, a dark personality and a sense of joy. Good at hypnosis, in the process of hypnosis, quilt Luo misunderstood as his boyfriend.

=== Ziluo ===
Portrayed by Nan Sheng, the beautiful, weak and gloomy dark girl, unable to extricate herself because her boyfriend left. Ziluo finally chose a psychologist to help him forget his boyfriend, but mistakenly recognized the doctor as a boyfriend during hypnosis.

=== A Liang ===
Portrayed by Li Xian, the ordinary insurance agent, who lost his favorite wife two years ago in a car accident, is still unable to let go today. Sad dreams appear again and again, and Liang can only rely on drugs to continue to live in a world without his wife.

=== Li Wen ===
Portrayed by Qiang Lili, A liang's lover, beautiful and kind, deeply loves Aliang. After A Liang died in a car accident, she jumped into the mysterious swimming pool and exchanged her life for A Liang's rebirth.

=== Zhang Zimin ===
Portrayed by Fan Zhiwei, career sportsman, the replica is a good man at home who loves his wife. The original is a husband who travels frequently and was attracted by a copy with the same appearance and different personality as his wife when he was on a business trip, but ultimately chose the wife's original.

=== Han Lin ===
Portrayed by Xie Chengying, Shen Wenxian's wife, the replica loves romance and cheerful personality. The original body is an understanding wife who endures her husband's frequent business trips, but eventually chooses to live with her husband's copy and gives up her husband's original body.
