= Nuts (2018 film) =

2018 Chinese film

- Simplified Chinese: 奇葩朵朵
- Hanyu Pinyin: Qípā duǒ duǒ
- Directed by: Li Xin
- Produced by: Shanghai Film (Group) Co., Ltd. Shanghai Haihai Film and Television Production Co., Ltd
- Starring: Zhang Rouyun; Li Xian; Sandra Ma
- Distributed by: Khorgos ICBC Film Co., Ltd. Khorgos Zhonghe Qiancheng Film Co., Ltd.
- Release date: 4 April 2018 (China)
- Running time: 98 minutes
- Country: China
- Language: Mandarin
- Box office: US$4.7 million

Nuts (Chinese: 奇葩朵朵; pinyin: Qípā duǒ duǒ) is a 2018 Chinese drama film directed by Li Xin and starring Zhang Ruoyun, Li Xian and Sandra Ma.

== Plot ==
Huang Jian (Zhang Ruo Yun) is considered a genius in science and technology. Su Zi Cong (Li Xian) comes from a very wealthy family and has everything going for him, including looks and brains. They both compete for an opportunity to study with a famous applied physics professor at MIT.

To fulfill one of the requirements for the application, Jian joins a science organization. He meets Zhu Zhu (Sandra Ma), a rookie reporter who is there undercover to try to land a big scoop. Who will win the coveted position?

== Cast ==
- Zhang Ruo Yun as Huang Jian
- Li Xian as Xu Zicong
- Sandra Ma as Zhu Zhu
- Liu Mintao
- Jiang Chao
- Li Xiaoyun

== Reception ==
The opening gross is $1,333,111. The perfect comedy elements and settings of "Nuts" make it the most different from other campus love stories.
