= Schemes in Antiques =

2021 Chinese-Hong Kong film by Derek Kwok

- Theatrical release poster
- Simplified Chinese: 古董局中局
- Hanyu Pinyin: Gǔdǒng jú zhōng jú
- Directed by: Derek Kwok
- Screenplay by: Zhu Xuan; Huang Hai; Derek Kwok; Fan Wenwen
- Based on: Antique Bureau Central Bureau by Ma Boyong
- Produced by: Han Sanping; Yang Shoucheng
- Starring: Lei Jiayin; Li Xian; Xin Zhilei; Ge You
- Cinematography: Jake Pollock
- Edited by: Matthew Hui
- Music by: Chu Wan Pin
- Production company: Emperor Motion Pictures
- Distributed by: Emperor Motion Pictures
- Release dates: 28 November 2021 (China); 21 April 2022 (Hong Kong)
- Running time: 123 min
- Countries: China; Hong Kong
- Language: Mandarin
- Box office: $51,637,422

Schemes in Antiques (Chinese: 古董局中局; pinyin: Gǔdǒng jú zhōng jú) is a 2021 adventure, suspense film based on Ma Boyong's novel, Antique Bureau Central Bureau, directed by Derek Kwok and produced by Han Sanping. The film stars Lei Jiayin, Li Xian, Xin Zhilei and Ge You. The movie tells of a dispute in the cultural relics circle caused by the return of a Buddha head by the Japanese Kido family.

The film was released in China on November 28, 2021, and later in Hong Kong on April 21, 2022, by Emperor Motion Pictures, it was postponed due to Hong Kong theatre closure of COVID-19 omicron variant pandemic.

== Plot ==
Miss Kido from Japan (Matsumoto Lili) is about to return a Buddha head of Wu Zetian Mingtang in the Tang Dynasty to China, but she indicated that the descendants of Xu Family, the white character door of the "Five Vessels", an authoritative organization of the cultural relics industry, would come to receive it. And the descendants of Xu's family wish (Lei Jiayin), although they have a talent for ancient times, they have no ambitions. The appearance of the Buddha's head disrupted his life. The entrustment of the granddaughter Huang Yanyan (Xin Zhilei), the head of Wumai, the bizarre death of his father, the persecution of Wumai genius medicine (Li Xian), and the grandfather's death (Ge You)'s follow-up and the pursuit of the mysterious man Lao Zhaofeng (Qin Yan), the wish must be entangled by the forces of all parties to find out the truth of the Buddha's head.

== Cast ==
- Lei Jiayin as Xu yuan
- Li Xian as Yao Buran
- Xin Zhilei as Huangyan Yan
- Ge You as Fu Gui
- Qin Yan as Lao Zhaofeng
- Qingxiang Wang as Huang Kewu
- Yong Mei as Shen Ye
- Tao Guo as Xu Heping
- Rock Ji as Scarface
- Alan Aruna as Zheng Guoqu

== Production ==
The film was established in 2018 and produced by the Emperor Films. Lei Jiayin, Li Xian, Xin Zhilei and Ge You joined for the first time at the first filming in September. The shooting process wrapped up in December 2019. On November 28, the film held its premiere in Beijing where director Guo Zijian, the original author and literary consultant Ma Boyong, producer Han Sanping, screenwriter Zhu Xuan, Fan Wenwen, Huang Hai, producer Liang Lin and actors Lei Jiayin, Xin Zhilei, Ge You, Aruna, etc. were present to share the behind the scenes of the film.

== Release ==
In China, Schemes in Antiques was scheduled to premiere on 30 April 2021, but the release was postponed.

== Box office ==
The pre-sale as of 30 November 2021 is 230.000 rmb or $36,501, with total gross worldwide $51,637,422
