= A Love Never Lost =

2025 Chinese television series

- Promotional poster
- Chinese: 人生若如初见
- Genre: Historical
- Written by: Jiang Qitao
- Directed by: Wang Wei
- Starring: Li Xian; Jessie Li
- Country of origin: China
- Original language: Chinese Mandarin
- No. of seasons: 1
- No. of episodes: 40

Production
- Production locations: Beijing, China
- Production companies: CMC Inc. Chinese Culture Group Company; iQiyi; Wuyuan Culture

Original release
- Network: iQIYI
- Release: May 13 – May 27, 2025

A Love Never Lost (Chinese: 人生若如初见) is a Chinese youth historical television series directed by Wang Wei, starring Li Xian, Jessie Li, Wei Daxun, and Zhou You. Set during the late Qing dynasty, the story follows aspiring Chinese youths struggling for their nation during turbulent times.

== Plot ==
The television series focuses on the fate of five aspiring Chinese youths who struggle to save their nation after its defeat in the First Sino-Japanese War.

During the war, China was devastated by the Boxer Rebellion. Noble youth Liang Xiang, revolutionaryYang Kaizhi, and soldier Li Renjun became the first group of progressive young people to study in Japan's non-commissioned military school. Later, the revolutionary party exiled Yu Tianbai. Then, Qiu Hong met up with the first three and began traveling along with them. The destiny of the five youths became closely linked. During their stay in Tokyo, the five youths took oaths, chased love, and struggled to revitalize China. After returning to their country, Liang Xiang attempted to explore the way to make China a wealthy country with strong soldiers.

However, he became deeply trapped in the vortex of power, full of passion but of no use. He eventually realized the central purpose of their revolution and rose in the seclusion. Yang Kaizhi's defeat in the Yanji War successfully thwarted Japanese imperialism, leading him to be hailed as "the hero of the border". He experienced the transformation of life and death in the revolutionary wave and later sacrificed himself to the cause. Meanwhile, the Revolutionary Party, the Constitutionalists, and the Northern Warlords constantly struggled for power. Finally, during the 1911 Revolution, revolutionary fighters overthrew the Qing dynasty, ending the old orders that lasted for thousands of years.

== Cast ==
=== Main ===
| Played by | Role | Introduction |
|---|---|---|
| Li Xian | Liang Xiang (梁乡) | Descendants of the late Qing Dynasty nobility |
| Jessie Li | Xie Shuhong (谢菽红) | |

=== Supporting ===
| Played by | Role | Introduction |
|---|---|---|
| Wu Yue | Liang's mother (梁乡母亲) | |
| Zhou You | Li Renjun (李人骏) | |
| Wei Daxun | Yang Kaizhi (杨凯之) | |
| Zhu Yawen | Wu Tianbai (吴天白) | |
| Wang Zhen | Duuo Mei | Liang Xiang's wife |
| Shi Shi | Xie Xueqing (谢雪青) | Xie Shuhong's sister, Yang Yifan's wife. |
| Bai Ke | Zai Feng (载沣) | |
| Song Ningfeng | Yang Yifan (杨一帆) | |
| Li Chengru | Song Baoquan (宋葆荃) | |
| Jiang Han | Gu Maichen (顾买臣) | |
| Liu Yitie | Song Chen (宋晨) | |
| Liu Meihan | Li Zhuji (李珠姬) | |
| Jiang Mengjie | Xiao Fenglan (萧凤兰) | |

== Production ==
On May 11, 2020 the production company officially announced the line up of the series. Li took the lead role of the series after being considered by screenwriters and director as the closest choice for the script. Earlier, Li's agent had revealed that he learned Japanese and horse riding for filming.

== Accolades ==
| Award | Year | Category | Nominee(s) | Result | Ref. |
|---|---|---|---|---|---|
| Golden Pupperfish Award | 2020 | Most Anticipated Television Series | A Love Never Lost | Won | |
| Fingertip Mobile Impact Summit | 2020 | Most Anticipated Television Series | A Love Never Lost | Won | |
| Golden Blossom Internet Film and Television Awards | 2021 | Most Anticipated Television Series of the Year | A Love Never Lost | Won | |
