= Liu Ruilin =

Chinese actor

- Born: October 6, 1990 (age 35); Beijing, China
- Other name: Wayne Liu
- Education: Beijing Film Academy
- Occupation: Actor
- Years active: 2011–present
- Agent: Jay Walk Studio

Chinese name
- Traditional Chinese: 劉芮麟
- Simplified Chinese: 刘芮麟
Transcriptions

Liu Ruilin (Chinese: 刘芮麟; born 6 October 1990 in Beijing, China), also known as Wayne Liu, is a Chinese actor who graduated from the Beijing Film Academy. He is best known for his supporting roles in the hit ancient dramas Eternal Love and The Flame's Daughter, as well as the romantic comedy film Go Away Mr. Tumor.

== Filmography ==
=== Film ===
Year	English title	Chinese title	Role	Notes	Ref.
2015	Go Away Mr. Tumor	滚蛋吧！肿瘤君	Little Xia	Support role	
2015	The Witness	我是證人	Liang Cong	Support role	
2016	Songs of the Youth 1969	記得少年那首歌	Xue Beijing	Main role	
2016	Who Sleeps My Bro	睡在我上舖的兄弟	Guan Chao	Main role	
2016	Kungfu Boys	龍拳小子	Yuan Lai	Main role	
2016	Scandal Maker	外公芳齡	Shang Yuan	Support role	
2018	21 Carat	21克拉	Gary	Guest role	
2019	So Long, My Son	地久天长	Liu Xing (adult)	Cameo	
2020	Quan Dao: The Journey of a Boxer	拳道	Kuen	Main role	

=== Television series ===
Year	English title	Chinese title	Role	Network	Notes
2013	Armor Hero Lava	鎧甲勇士拿瓦	Ma Kuohai	iQIYI	
2014	Honey Bee Man	我爱男闺蜜	Mo Xiaokang	Anhui TV, Dragon TV	
2016	Who Sleeps My Bro	睡在我上舖的兄弟	Guan Chao	LeTV	
2016	The Boss is Coming	老板来了	Tang Tang	Tencent Video	
2016	A Love For Separation	小别离	Mu Mi	Beijing TV, Zhejiang TV	
2017	Eternal Love	三生三世十里桃花	Zi Lan	Dragon TV, Zhejiang TV	
2018	The Flame's Daughter	烈火如歌	Yu Zihan	Youku	
2018	Bedtime Hero	超能造梦	Ding Yi	iQIYI	
2018	Royal Highness	回明之杨凌传	Zhu Houzhao	Youku	
2019	Behind The Scenes	幕后之王	Xu Tianze	Beijing TV, Dragon TV	
2019	In Youth	趁我们还年轻	Shi Weicong	Dragon TV	
2020	Eternal Love of Dream	三生三世枕上书	Yan Chiwu	Tencent Video	
2020	True Colours	嘉人本色	Nian Mengyu	iQIYI	
2021	Storm Eye	暴风眼	Du Meng	Dragon TV, Zhejiang TV	
2021	Miss Crow with Mr. Lizard	乌鸦小姐与蜥蜴先生	Xu Chengran	Tencent Video	
2021	The Other Half of Me and You	我和你的另一半	Gao Zirui	Youku	
2022	The Autumn Ballad	嫣语赋	Qin Xuan	Tencent Video	
2022	Who Rules The World	且试天下	Feng Ju	Tencent Video	
2023	Love Heals	听说你喜欢我	Cheng Zhouyu	Tencent Video	
2023	Enlighten Your Life	许你万家灯火	Ye Qichen	CCTV	
2023	The Youth Memories	梦中的那片海	Ye Guohua	CCTV, Dragon TV, Tencent Video	
2024	Growing Together	欢乐家长群	Ma Yingjie	Hunan TV, Mango TV	
2025	Growing Together 2	欢乐家长群 第二季	Ma Yingjie	Hunan TV, Mango TV	
2025	Fragrance of the Pomegranates	红石榴餐厅	Li Guangtian	CCTV	
2025	Sniper Butterfly	狙击蝴蝶	Shen Yiyang	Tencent Video	
2026	Love Has Fireworks	爱情有烟火	Jun Cheng	CCTV, Tencent Video, iQIYI	
TBA	Live in This Moment	此刻的生活	Ye Qicong	Tencent Video	
TBA	Back to Life	冬风吹又生	Fu Linchuan	Tencent Video	

=== Reality shows ===
Year	Title	Chinese title	Note	Ref.
2019	Super Penguin League; Season:2	超级企鹅联盟 Super3	Player; Live Basketball Competition	

== Discography ==
Year	English title	Chinese title	Album	Notes/Ref.
2016	"A Lifetime For You"	一生為你	Kungfu Boys OST	
2018	"A Laughter of Credulousness"	一笑荒唐	The Flame's Daughter OST	
2018	"Wish of the Wind "	夙愿	Royal Highness OST	

== Awards and nominations ==
Year	Award	Category	Nominated work	Result	Ref.
2016	31st Hundred Flowers Awards	Best Supporting Actor	Go Away Mr. Tumor	Nominated	
2017	16th Golden Phoenix Awards	Newcomer Award	Go Away Mr. Tumor	Won	
2017	Chinese Campus Art Glory Festival	Most Popular Actor	Kungfu Boys	Won	
