= The Enigma of Arrival (film) =

2020 Chinese film

Enigma of Arrival
- Theatrical poster The Enigma of Arrival
- Simplified Chinese: 抵达之谜
- Hanyu Pinyin: Dǐdá zhī mí
- Directed by: Song Wen
- Written by: Wen Song; Zonglei Li; Richeng Tao; Lian Duan
- Produced by: Xie Fei
- Starring: Li Xian; Xuan Gu; Lin Xiaofan
- Narrated by: Liu Weibo
- Release date: October 5, 2018 (Busan)
- Running time: 112 minutes
- Country: China
- Language: Mandarin
- Box office: $3,002,045

The Enigma of Arrival (Chinese: 抵达之谜; pinyin: Dǐdá zhī mí) is a 2020 Chinese drama film directed by Song Wen and starring Li Xian, Xuan Gu, and Lin Xiaofan. The film was premiere on 2018 Busan Film Festival.

== Synopsis ==
After many years, a group of high school friends reunites. They have not seen each other since the disappearance of Dondong, a girl they all secretly fancied. The circumstances of her disappearance cause the end of their friendship. Although a long time has passed, there are still things unspoken about what exactly happened during those crucial years.

== Cast ==
- Li Xian as Xiao Long
- Xuan Gu as Li Dongdong
- Lin Xiaofan as Da Si

== Release ==
=== Theatrical ===
The Enigma of Arrival had its premiere at the Busan International Film Festival, October 2018. The film was released in China on July 31 in IMAX and 3D. It was originally scheduled to be released on Valentine's Day 2020, but delayed to amid the Coronavirus disease.

== Reception ==
=== Box Office ===
The Enigma of Arrival grossed $3.34 million in its debut, according to Ent Group.
