= Soul Snatcher =

2020 Chinese-Hong Kong film by Song Haolin and Yi Liqi

- Theatrical release poster with original planned release
- Traditional Chinese: 赤狐書生
- Simplified Chinese: 赤狐书生
- Hanyu Pinyin: Chì hú shūshēng
- Directed by: Song Haolin; Yi Liqi
- Screenplay by: Ran Jianan; Li Huiyan; Yang Weiwei
- Based on: Chun Jiang Hua Yue Ye by Duo Duo
- Produced by: Bill Kong; Jayce Shi; Fan Kim-hung; Sammi Chan; Raman Hui
- Starring: Chen Linong; Li Xian; Hanikezi; Jiang Chao; Pei Kuishan; Chang Chen-kuang; Li Xiaochuan
- Cinematography: Chan Chi Ying
- Edited by: Zhang Qi
- Music by: Joe Hisaishi
- Production companies: Heroplus (Wuxi) Limited; Beijing White Horse Time TV & Movie Co., Ltd.; Edko (Beijing) Films Limited; Edko Films Limited; Irresistible Alpha Limited; Beijing Weimeng Internet Technology Co., Ltd.; Huawen Picture Co., Ltd.; Douyin Culture (Xiamen) Limited
- Distributed by: Edko (Beijing) Films Limited; Shanghai Tao Piao Piao Movie & TV Culture Co., Ltd.; Huaxia Film Distribution Co., Ltd.
- Release date: December 4, 2020
- Running time: 125 minutes
- Countries: China; Hong Kong
- Language: Mandarin
- Box office: US$19,500,000

Soul Snatcher (Chinese: 赤狐书生; pinyin: Chì hú shūshēng; lit. 'Red Fox Scholar') is a 2020 live-action/CGI fantasy film produced by Bill Kong starring Li Xian and Chen Linong.

== Plot ==
To achieve immortality and be promoted to spiritual immortal, magical fox spirit Bai Shisan disguises himself as a young man and travels to the human world in search of a 'divine pill', or a central spiritual reservoir that entities possess, to take - killing the original holder. There he befriends the innocent and impoverished scholar Wang Zijin, who is on a journey to Beijing to take the arduous imperial magistrates examination. To keep Wang safe, Bai Shisan must bond with him on the road to the examination and fend off threats from mythic creatures and evil spirits who run rampant along their journey. Along the way Bai Shisan comes to realize Wang's divine pill is the key to Bai Shisan's transcendence. What choice will Bai Shishan make once he realizes that in order to achieve immortality he would have to kill his best friend?

== Cast ==
=== Starring ===
- Chen Linong as Wang Zijin
- Li Xian as Bai Shisan (Thirteen)

=== Co-Starring ===
- Hankiz Omar as Yinglian
- Jiang Chao as Kuhai Academy owner Zhu
- Pei Kuishan as Mr. He
- Chang Chen-kuang as chief of fox tribe
- Li Xiaochuan as Yin-Yang Taoist priest

=== Guest Starring ===
- Wang Yaoching as Liu Daoran

=== Special appearance ===
- Hao Shaowen as donkey shack owner
- Tien Niu as chicken restaurant owner
- Yang Zi as Ying Wuxie

== Production ==
Two months before the start-up, Chen Linong, and Li Xian entered the group ahead of schedule, performing an average of 6 hours of performance and movement training every day as seen on the soundtrack's MV, Glorious Future sung by the two male lead. The crew also organized script readings many times to further improve the script and character details. In January, the director decided to change the title from Spring River Flower Moon Night (Chun Jiang Hua Yue Ye) into Red Fox Scholar and announced that they would set a schedule for the 2020 summer. However, because the special effects of the movie have not been completed, and the trailer cannot be cut out for the time being, the two portraits of Chen Linong and Li Xian acted as stage dramas, and they creatively performed a version of the "concept trailer". In addition to the trailer, "Red Fox Scholar" also released a concept poster designed by artist Huang Hai. Chen Linong and Li Xian lay on the river facing the wind, and a little star reflected from the sky reflected on the river, forming a huge fox. Due to the many private questions on Weibo, the author makes an explanation that the two male led isn't involved on love story but just friend and the genre is a fantasy drama.

== Marketing ==
Prior to the production announcement, Chen Linong and Li Xian appeared on Elle Cover. The two male lead released soundtrack of Red Fox Scholar, titled Glorious Future (Qian Cheng Si jin) peak at 8 on Billboard China Social Chart

On August 30, 2019, the film crew released the MV for the final song "A Bright Future" sung by the two leading actors.

On January 17, 2020, the film crew announced that it would be scheduled for the 2020 summer vacation and released a scheduled poster designed by artist Huang Hai. On August 11, the film released a poster, revealing the starring roles of Chen Linong and Li Xian, and announced that it is tentatively scheduled to be released in November 2020. On October 13, the film announced that it would be released on December 4, 2020, and released a scheduled trailer. On October 28, the film released a MV for "What's the Fox Calling", in which Huang Ling, Li Sidani, and Zhang Hanyun, the sisters of Chengfengpaolang, formed a group to sing. On November 2, the film crew released a new trailer. On November 6, the film crew released an IMAX exclusive poster.On November 11, the film released the trailer of "Group of Demons".On November 18, the film crew released a special episode of Wang Yaoqing.

== Release ==
In China, Soul Snatcher was originally planned to open in August 2020. However, due to the COVID-19 pandemic, the film's release was first postponed to November, and eventually released on December 4.

== Behind- the-scenes look ==
- The original name of the movie was "Spring River with Flowers and Moonlight Night《春江花月夜》". Bill Kong thought that the name was too aesthetic and the audience could not know the content of the movie from the name, so it was renamed "Soul Snatcher".
- When Chen Linong and Li Xian were filming an emotional scene in a heavy rainstorm, the two of them were soaked to the skin. They were exhausted and filmed until dawn in one breath.
- Starting two months before the filming of the film, Chen Linong trained for "Red Fox Scholar" for 6–8 hours a day as required; at the same time, he never missed every script reading.

== Reception ==
Soul Snatcher earned $19,500,000 at the Chinese box office.
