= Tientsin Mystic =

- Theatrical release poster
- Genre: Fantasy; Suspense
- Based on: He Shen by Tianxia Bachang
- Written by: Liu Chenglong; Yang Hongwei; Zhang Chao; Liu Mengsha; Li Yang
- Directed by: Tian Li
- Starring: Li Xian; Zhang Ming'en; Wang Zixuan; Chen Yumi
- Country of origin: China
- Original language: Mandarin
- No. of seasons: 1
- No. of episodes: 24

Production
- Running time: 45 mins
- Production companies: iQiyi; Kongfu Pictures

Original release
- Network: iQiyi
- Release: 19 July 2017 – 2019

Tientsin Mystic (Chinese: 河神) is a 2017 Chinese television series based on the novel He Shen (河神1·鬼水怪谈) by Tianxia Bachang. It is produced by iQiyi, and stars actors Li Xian, Zhang Ming'en, Wang Zixuan and Chen Yumi. The first season aired on iQiyi on July 19, 2017, and Netflix in 2018. The series won a Silver Medal for Best Visual Effects & a Bronze Medal for Best Direction at the 2018 New York Festivals World's Best TV & Films Competition.

In September 2018, iQiyi and Kongfu Pictures announced that a second season is currently under pre-production. The second season began filming on November 20, 2018, with Jin Shijia replacing Li Xian as the lead actor. Season 2 is streaming now with multi-languages subtitles on iQIYI.

== Synopsis ==
Set in the 1920s Republican era, flooding ravages the land of Tianjin and conjures up numerous strange tales about the river. Guo Deyou is a part of the river salvage team, who retrieves bodies from the water. His master is nicknamed 'Old River God'; as the 'Little River God', Deyou has inherited his ability to use tobacco to uncover the truth, however, his body cannot handle smoke in large amounts. He ends up being suspected for the murder of a distinguished chairman, whose son Ding Mao, a trained forensic investigator, joins forces with him to uncover the truth. With their female partners - Gu Ying, the daughter of a sorceress and Deyou's childhood friend, and Xiao Lan-lan, a journalist, whose father is a rich local businessman - they begin an investigation that leads them to an incident twenty years ago, and a cult whose presence is still affecting the city in increasingly sinister ways.

== Cast ==
- Li Xian as Guo Deyou
- Zhang Ming'en as Ding Mao
- Wang Zixuan as Gu Ying
- Chen Yumi as Xiao Lanlan

== Soundtrack ==
The series' soundtracks are sang by Jam Hsiao and lead actress Wang Zixuan.

No.	Title	Singers	Length
1.	"River (河)" (Theme song)	Jam Hsiao
2.	"Little Godly Woman (小神婆)"	Wang Zixuan

== Reception ==
The series received critical acclaim for its exciting plot, suspenseful storyline and high quality production. It also received positive reviews for its faithful and skillful adaptation from a novel, by successfully keeping the "essence" of the original novel while also leveraging its content and characters. It has a score of 8.1 on Douban, and over 2 billion views online. China Daily named Tientsin Mystic as one of the series which marks big improvement of quality of Chinese web series in 2017.

== Accolades ==
Award	Year	Category	Nominee(s)	Result	Ref.
New York Festivals - TV & Film Awards	2018	Best Drama	Tientsin Mystic	Nominated	
New York Festivals - TV & Film Awards	2018	Best Director	Tian Li	Bronze Medal	
New York Festivals - TV & Film Awards	2018	Best Visual Effects		Silver Medal	
China TV Drama Awards	2018	New Generation Web Actor Award	Wang Zixuan	Won	
The Actors of China Awards	2017	Best Web Drama Actor	Li Xian	Nominated	
The Actors of China Awards	2017	Outstanding Actor	Li Xian	Won	
The Actors of China Awards	2017	Best Actress (Web series)	Wang Zixuan	Won	
iQiyi All-Star Carnival	2017	Best Newcomer	Wang Zixuan	Won	

=== Censorship ===
The drama was briefly taken off air in February 2018 from iQiyi.
