= Li Xian (actor) =

Chinese actor

- 李现
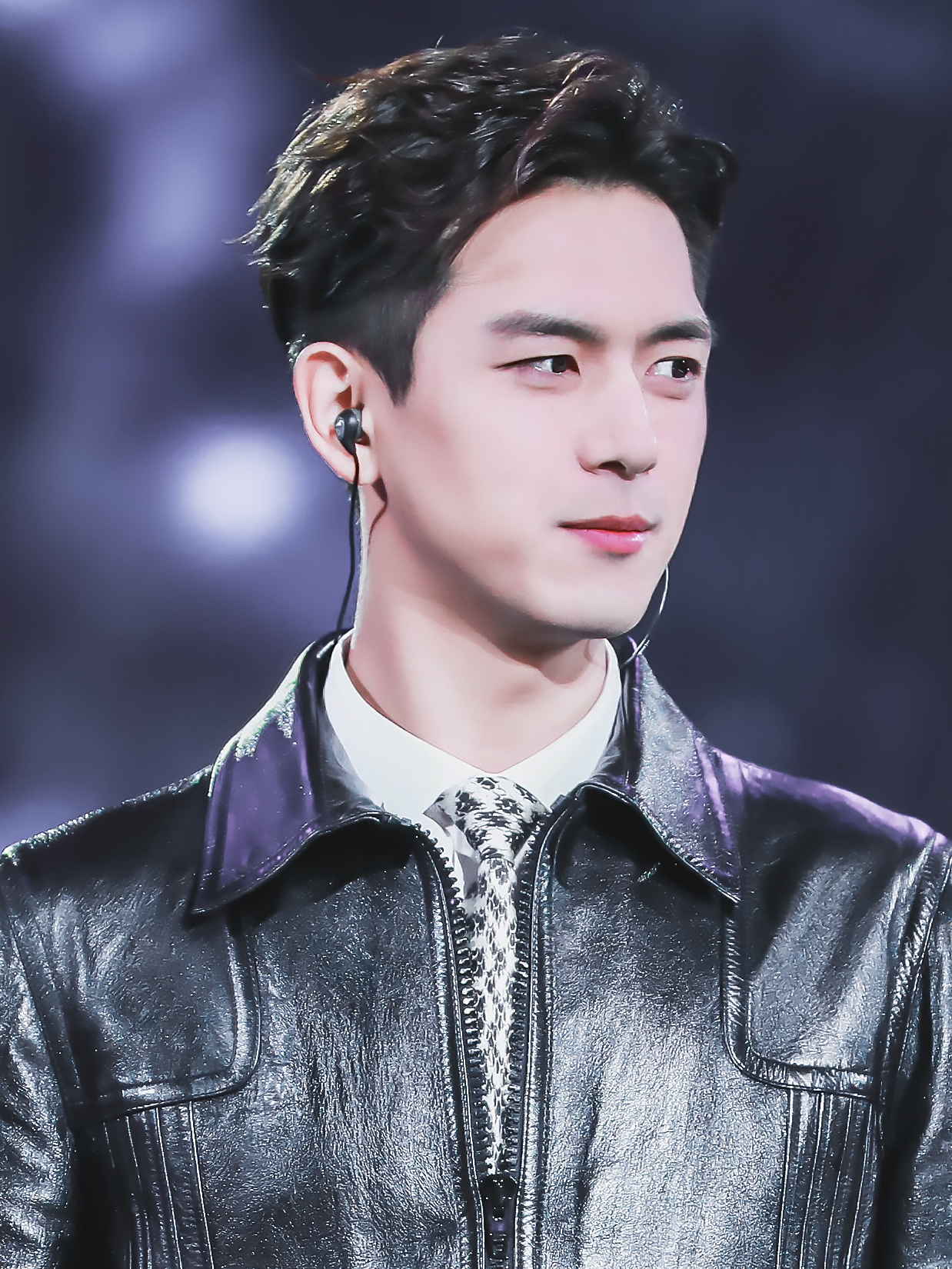
- Li at the Dragon TV 2020 New Year Countdown
- Pronunciation: Lǐ Xiàn
- Born: Li Xian 李晛; 19 October 1991 (age 35); Xianning, Hubei, China
- Education: Beijing Film Academy Performance Department
- Occupation: Actor
- Years active: 2011–present
- Agent: Easy Entertainment (2016–present)
- Notable work: Go Go Squid! Flourished Peony
- Height: 185 cm (6 ft 1 in)
- Awards: Full list

Chinese name
- Simplified Chinese: 李现
- Traditional Chinese: 李現
Transcriptions
Standard Mandarin
- Hanyu Pinyin: Lǐ Xiàn

Li Xian (Chinese: 李现; born 19 October 1991) is a Chinese actor, known for his roles in the films Feng Shui (2012) and Who Sleeps My Bro (2016), as well as the TV dramas Tientsin Mystic (2017), Go Go Squid! (2019), Flourished Peony (2025) and In the Name of Blossom (2025).

== Early life ==
Li was born on 19 October 1991, in Xianning and grew up in Jingzhou, Hubei. He attended the Jingzhou Middle School. In 2009, he planned to study STEM in college, but failed the college entrance examination. He retook the exam and was admitted as an acting major at Beijing Film Academy in 2010. For the convenience of entry, he changed his given name from "晛" to "现", which means "present".

== Career ==
Li began his acting career with a minor role in Wong Jing's film Feng Shui (2012). He followed with a role in the romantic teen film Singing When We're Young (2013). He made his small-screen debut in the web series City of Fantasy (2014). He gained attention for his role in the coming-of-age web series Who Sleeps My Bro (2016), which he reprised in the eponymous feature film adapted from the web series. Li was cast in the esports romance film Love O2O (2016) and the web series Medical Examiner Dr. Qin. He starred in the thriller detective web series Tientsin Mystic (2017) and appeared in the film The Founding of an Army (2017).

Li rose to wider prominence with the esports romantic comedy television series Go Go Squid! (2019), based on the web novel Stewed Squid with Honey. According to National Business Daily, it was the most-streamed series of 2019. Li earned his first nomination for the Huading Award for Best New Actor in 2019 for the role.

Li then starred in the costume drama Sword Dynasty (2019). In 2020, Li participated in the CCTV New Year's Gala, where he performed "Hello 2020". In the same year, he appeared in three films: The Enigma of Arrival, Love Song 1980 and Soul Snatcher. He also had a cameo in Leap. In 2022, Li starred in the historical drama A Love Never Lost, which was taken off air soon after its premiere for unspecified reasons.

In October 2025, Tourism New Zealand appointed Li as its brand ambassador in China, with a one-year partnership to front its #NowinNewZealand campaign. In October 2026, Tourism New Zealand announced that the partnership had been renewed.

== Remarks on sexual orientation ==
In 2012, Li posted on Weibo, "I am not gay, and I am repulsed by homosexuality." In 2015, he posted that he wanted to clarify that he was straight, saying that he had been mistaken for gay on the platform and that explaining did not help.

In October 2017, reports that Li would star in a television adaptation of the boys' love novel Silent Reading prompted online debate; the novel's author later denied the reports. In 2020, Li starred in the film Soul Snatcher, which is based on a boys' love novel; the same-sex romance of the source material was removed due to censorship in China.

== Selected filmography ==
Film

Year	English title	Chinese title	Role	Ref.
2012	Feng Shui	万箭穿心	Ma Xiaobao	
2013	Singing When We're Young	初恋未满	Da Wei	
2016	Who Sleeps My Bro	睡在我上铺的兄弟	Xie Xun	
2016	Love O2O	微微一笑很倾城	Yu Banshan	
2017	Deadly Love	玩命试爱	Fang Zhibin	
2017	The Founding of an Army	建军大业	Luo Ronghuan	
2018	Nuts	奇葩朵朵	Xu Zicong	
2020	The Enigma of Arrival	抵达之谜	Xiao Long	
2020	Love Song 1980	恋曲1980	Liang Zhengwen	
2020	Soul Snatcher	赤狐书生	Bai Shisan	
2021	Schemes in Antiques	古董局中局	Yao Buran	
2023	I Believe	靠近我一点	Yu Kefeng	
2024	She's Got No Name	酱园弄	Zhang Baofu	

Television series

Year	English title	Chinese title	Role	Ref.
2014	City of Fantasy	奇妙世纪	A Liang	
2016	Four Ladies	翩翩冷少俏佳人	Ding Zihui	
2016	Who Sleeps My Bro	睡在我上铺的兄弟	Xie Xun	
2016	Medical Examiner Dr. Qin	法医秦明	Lin Tao	
2017	Tientsin Mystic	河神	Guo Deyou	
2018	Only Side by Side with You	南方有乔木	Chang Jianxiong	
2019	Go Go Squid!	亲爱的，热爱的	Han Shangyan	
2019	Sword Dynasty	剑王朝	Ding Ning	
2021	11 Left	剩下的11个	Chen Zhenyu / Fan Qiang / Yao Yi	
2023	Meet Yourself	去有风的地方	Xie Zhiyao	
2024	Shooting Stars	群星闪耀时	Xiang Yuansheng/Hua Zhen	
2024	Will Love in Spring	春色寄情人	Chen Maidong	
2025	Flourished Peony	国色芳华	Jiang Changyang/Sui Zhi	
2025	A Love Never Lost	人生若如初见	Liang Xiang / Yu Bugu	
2025	In the Name of Blossom	锦绣芳华	Jiang Changyang/Sui Zhi	
2026	A Prophet	长风起	Shangguan Chengming	
TBA	A Touch of Green	雾里青	Meng Fuyuan	

== Discography ==
Year	English title	Chinese title	Album	Notes/Ref.
2019	"Give to the Future"	给未来	Go Go Squid! OST	
2019	"A Glorious Future"	前程似锦	Red Fox Scholar OST	with Chen Linong
2020	"Hello 2020"	你好2020	2020 CCTV Spring Festival	with Zhu Yilong, Zhou Dongyu, Sandra Ma, Li Yi
2020	"Wuhan, How Are You"	武汉，你好吗		with Chang Shilei, Doudou, Zhu Yilong
2021	"Running Youth"	奔跑的青春	2021 CCTV Spring Festival	with Dilraba, Chen Linong, Liu Haocun, The9, TNT

== Awards and nominations ==
Li's roles in Tientsin Mystic and Go Go Squid! earned him nominations at The Actors of China Awards, for Best Web Drama Actor and Best Actor (Emerald category) respectively. He ranked 19th on the 2020 Forbes China Celebrity 100 list and was included in Forbes China's 30 Under 30 list in 2019.
