= Meet Yourself =

- Promotional poster
- Simplified Chinese: 去有风的地方
- Genre: Slice of life; Romance; Drama
- Screenplay by: Wang Xiongcheng; Shui Qianmo
- Directed by: Ding Ziguang
- Starring: Liu Yifei; Li Xian
- Country of origin: China
- Original language: Mandarin
- No. of episodes: 40

Production
- Production locations: Dali; Beijing
- Production company: Huace Pictures

Original release
- Network: Hunan TV; Mango TV
- Release: January 3, 2023

Meet Yourself (Chinese: 去有风的地方; pinyin: Qù yǒu fēng de dìfāng) is a 2023 Chinese television drama series directed by Ding Zi Guang and starring Liu Yifei and Li Xian. It premiered on Hunan TV on January 3, 2023.

== Synopsis ==
Xu Hongdou, a white-collared employee nearing her mid 30s, faced a major obstacle in life when her best friend unexpectedly fell ill with cancer and died. Distraught and unable to come to terms with her friend's death, Xu eventually found it tormenting to continue her working life in the city. She decided to quit her job and take a long break in a fictional rural village, Yun Miao, situated in Dali, Yunnan Province, Mainland China, a city her best friend had longed to visit with her. She subconsciously begins her journey to discover the meaning and way of life.

== Cast ==
=== Main ===
- Liu Yifei as Xu Hongdou (许红豆)
  - Former front office manager of a five-star hotel. She is stubborn in her bones, she does not want to admit defeat, and does not want to show her vulnerable side to others. Serious and responsible at work, kind and enthusiastic, able to bend and stretch.
- Li Xian as Xie Zhiyao (谢之遥)
  - The behind-the-scenes boss of Dali Town, with a master's degree in economics, was once an investment manager of a venture capital company in Beijing. Smart, handsome, and assertive, he has always been a leader among his peers. Warm and kind-hearted in heart, emphasizing feelings, but on the surface, he is a bit of a naughty little ruffian. He likes to live a casual and free life. He doesn't want to be a typical elite in the city. He is more willing to walk in the alleys of his hometown in flip flops. He wants to build his hometown and provide job opportunities for the villagers. He is a person with a bit of idealism.

=== Supporting ===
- Hu Bing Qing as Lin Na (林娜)
  - Small town barista. One of the residents of Youfeng Xiaoyuan B&B seems to be an ordinary long-term tourist who works part-time as a small town cafe dispatcher, but she is actually a singer who sings well. She was accidentally recognized by passers-by at a party, which aroused the suspicion of his friends. After "escaping reality" during this period of seclusion, Nana also realized that she should get out of the negative harm caused by cyberbullying. Also because of the enthusiasm of the partners in Youfeng Xiaoyuan and her reluctance to Dali, Nana resolutely chose to start a new business in the small town.
- Tu Songyan as Ma Qiushan (马丘山)
  - Small courtyard meditator. One of the residents of Youfeng Xiaoyuan B&B, he meditates in the courtyard every day, besides meditating, he just drinks tea. However, this kind of life is actually an experience for him. It seems that Xie Zhiyao randomly intervened in Machushan's business regardless of his own business, but in fact the two had years of entanglement that was unknown to everyone. Machushan needs to find a new way out in the chaotic thinking and challenging reality.
- Niu Junfeng as Hu Youyu (胡有鱼)
  - A musician, works as a resident singer in a bar in Dali, plays the acoustic guitar, and likes folk songs. Everyone calls him "Old Hu". He has lived in "Youfeng Xiaoyuan" for a year. He is a passionate and humorous inspiration seeker. As a resident of Youfeng Courtyard, he is often misunderstood by the residents of the Courtyard because of his enthusiastic personality, but after getting along with him, everyone realized that he is actually a very righteous and gentlemanly person .
- Wu Yanshu as Granny Xie (谢阿奶)
  - A native of Yunmiao Village, Xie Zhiyao and Xie Zhiyuan's grandma. A wise old lady who is optimistic about life and always brings warmth to the young people around her. She lived in the village all her life and was kind. Sometimes the aura is overwhelming, and "force" will be used directly.
- Dong Qing as Xie Xiaochun (谢晓春)
  - A native of Yunmiao Village, Xie Xiaoxia’s elder sister, because her father died early and her mother was honest, she gave people the impression of being aggressive and powerful, but she was actually a bluff and didn’t want to be bullied. She got married a year after graduating from university, and now she is divorced with a three-year-old daughter. After Xie Zhiyao returned to her hometown to start a business, she also came back to help manage Youfeng Coffee, Youfeng Courtyard, e-commerce and external affairs.
- Fan Shuaiqi as Huang Xinxin (黄欣欣)
  - The director of the Yunmiao Village Committee has become a village official after graduating from university. She has ideas and passion in her heart, and she is inspired to help the villagers get rich. She is simple and not so materialistic in her heart, and her soul is interesting and persistent. She is a clear stream among young people. As a young director of the village committee, she worked tirelessly to visit every household to understand the living conditions of the local people. She took a serious and responsible attitude towards her work and was regarded as a "beautiful college student village official" in everyone's eyes.
- Ma Wengwei as Damai/Zhou Qingtian (周晴天)
  - Translucent Internet writer, pen name "Barley Tea", is a tenant of Youfeng Courtyard, with a sensitive personality, a senior house girl who doesn't like to socialize, and has lived in "Youfeng Courtyard" for three months. In order to escape the pressure from her family, she came to live in Youfeng Courtyard, where she made friends with Nana, Hongdou and other girlfriends. With their help, her personality gradually became cheerful, and she strengthened her love for writing. Later, encouraged by the people in the yard, she overcame the hurdle in her heart, and her writing went smoothly.
- Zhao Ziqi as Bai Manjun (白蔓君)
  - A divorced full-time housewife with a bold personality, she has lost the right to choose in her life since she became pregnant. She originally thought that marrying love would keep her happy, so she became a housewife with peace of mind, but in the end, she experienced betrayal and deception but divorced. Her biggest hobby is listening to music to relieve her boredom. As a new tenant in the small courtyard, the way Bai Manjun and Hu Youyu met was not accidental. The two resonated and intersected because of the music, and they always had endless topics to talk about.
- Shi Peng Yuan as Xie Xiao Xia (谢晓夏)
  - A native of Yunmiao Village, Xie Xiaochun's younger brother, he is warm and kind, and works quickly. His father died early, and he was afraid of poverty when he was a child. After graduating from high school, he failed to go to university. He learned woodcarving from his uncle, and worked as a craftsman in Xie Zhiyao's e-commerce.

=== Guests ===
- Gong Beibi as Xu Hongmi (许红米)
- Janice Wu as Chen Nanxing
- Joseph Zeng as Zhang Ming Yu
