= Shishang Xiansheng =

Monthly men's magazine in China

- Categories: Men's magazine
- Frequency: Monthly
- Publisher: Trends magazine group
- Founded: 1993; 32 years ago
- Company: Trends Media Group; IDG; Hearst
- Country: China
- Language: Chinese

Shishang xiansheng (时尚先生; Mr Fashionable) is a Chinese monthly men's magazine. It is the first men's magazine in the country. In addition, it was the sole magazine targeted Chinese men until 2000 when Da Dushi, another men's magazine, was launched.

== History and profile ==
The magazine was started in 1993 as a supplement to Shishang yieng, a women's magazine. The founding company was the Trends magazine group. From 1997 Shishang xiansheng became a separate title. Two years later the magazine began to be published as the Chinese version of the American men's magazine Esquire. Upon this an English script Esquire was added to the background of its title.

Shishang xiansheng is a venture of Trends Media Group, International Data Group (IDG), and Hearst. The magazine is published by the Trends magazine group on a monthly basis. Its target audience is affluent Chinese men in their 30s and 40s. The stated objective of Shishang xiansheng is to provide a harmonious balance between the material and spiritual wealth, which reminds the official discourse of Chinese state "to grab with both hands, with both hands tough." It mostly covers the topics of fashion and accessories.

The magazine established an award, Man of the Year, in 2004. In 2005 Wang Feng was appointed the editor-in-chief of the magazine. In 2008 a movie, Esquire Runway, was produced by the publishing company to celebrate the fifteenth anniversary of the magazine. Shishang xiansheng was the best selling men's magazine in China in 2010 with a circulation of 680,000 copies based on the reports by the publishing company.
