= Sword Dynasty =

2019 Chinese TV series

- Poster
- 剑王朝
- Genre: Wuxia; Fantasy; Costume drama; Action
- Based on: Sword Dynasty by Wuzui
- Written by: Rao Jun
- Directed by: Jones Wah-Kon Ma
- Starring: Li Xian; Li Yitong; Liu Yijun; Yao Di
- Country of origin: China
- Original language: Mandarin
- No. of episodes: 34

Production
- Executive producer: Feng Xiaogang
- Producers: Dai Ying; Lu Guoqiang
- Production location: Hengdian World Studios
- Running time: ≈45 minutes per episode
- Production company: iQiyi

Original release
- Network: iQiyi
- Release: December 6, 2019 – January 5, 2020

Sword Dynasty (剑王朝) is a 2019 Chinese wuxia-fantasy live-action streaming television series adapted from the novel of the same title by Wuzui (无罪). Directed by Jones Wah-Kon Ma, the series starred Li Xian and Li Yitong, and was first aired on iQiyi on December 6, 2019. Set in a fictional era based on the Warring States period of China, the series follows a swordsman who seeks to avenge his master by killing a king.

== Synopsis ==
The series is set in a fictional era based on the Warring States period of China. Heng, the most powerful of all the states, aims to conquer the other states and unify China under its rule. Ding Ning, a young man who grew up in a shop selling alcoholic drinks, seeks to avenge his master Liang Jingmeng by killing Yuan Wu, the king of Heng. He and his companion, Zhangsun Qianxue, pretend to be family (nephew and aunt) to hide their real identities. Gradually, it is revealed that Ding Ning is actually Liang Jingmeng, who had used a mystical technique to resurrect himself as a different person. Ding Ning meets and befriends Yuan Zichu, the crown prince of Heng, and others who share similar aspirations. Yuan Wu and his queen Ye Zhen start to feel uneasy when they recall how they had betrayed Liang Jingmeng years ago, and start to see Ding Ning as a potential threat to their rule.

== Cast ==
- Li Xian as Ding Ning
  - Bian Cheng as Ding Ning (child)
- Li Yitong as Zhangsun Qianxue
- Liu Yijun as Yuan Wu
- Yao Di as Ye Zhen
- Peter Ho as Liang Jingmeng
- Zhao Yuanyuan as Ye Celeng
- Zhang Mingming as Chen Xuan
- Marco Lo as Lin Zhujiu
- Li Guangfu as Xue Wangxu
- Li Luqi as Mo Qinggong
- Yu Zhihui as Lady Shang
- Hu Jian as Wang Taixu
- Liu Yitong as Yuan Zichu
- Du Jingyi as Rong Gongnü
- Yao Qingren as Li Xiang
- Liu Poxiao as Fang Hou
- Ma Jinghan as Liang Lian
- Han Shuo as Qi Pomo
- Ni Xinyu as Song Shenshu
- Sun Zhengyu as Dugu Hou
- Tong Xuebing as Nangong Shang
- Gao Yi as Lin Daoji
- Liu Kai as Jiang Li
- Sun Shaolong as Sun Xing
- Chen Tingxuan as Nangong Caishu
- Liu Hailan as Xie Rou
- Xiao Xu as Xie Changsheng
- Yang Zihua as Di Qingmei
- Yuan Hangming as He Zhaoxi
- Zhang Weina as Bai Shanshui
- Feng Yang as Fan Zhuo
- Liu Lu as Zhao Si
- Wu Di as Zhao Zhan
- Zong Fengyan as Baili Suxue
- Xia Xingling as Jing Liuli
- He Zhonghua as Tuoba Wuchou
- Yang Tong as Li Lingjun
- Kou Zhenhai as Lian Ying

== Production ==
iQiyi first adapted the novel by Wuzui into an animated series which premiered on April 26, 2017. The production staff for the live-action series was announced in November 2017, with Feng Xiaogang as executive producer, Jones Wah-Kon Ma as the main director, Rao Jun as the main screenwriter and To-hoi Kong as the stunt coordinator. Co-producing the series alongside iQiyi is Beijing Xinliliang Entertainment and Beijing Shengji Entertainment. One month before the shoot, Li entered the group one month in advance and followed the action team to practice sword moves.

The series was filmed from December 2017 to April 2018 at Hengdian World Studios.

== Design ==
The clothing designed based on each of the characters, the male and female lead; Ding Ning and Qingxue's linen dress reflect the simplicity of the children of the rivers and lakes, while the black and golden kimono of the king and the red gorgeous palace of the queen represents the luxury and majesty of the peak of power. In addition, the martial arts such as "Moving Mountain", "Freehand Fragment", "Shendan Blood Talisman" in the play are also set with romantic and mysterious artistic imagination, and both realistic and freehand in aesthetic creation. Tonal, collide with a unique historical and cultural atmosphere. As the producer Feng Xiaogang shared at the meeting, he hoped that the style of costumed martial arts could be integrated with the aesthetics of modern young audiences to create an aesthetic style that is both cultural and acceptable to young audiences.

=== Accolades ===
Award	Year	Category	Nominee(s)	Result	Ref.
The Actors of China Award	2020	Best Actor - Emerald Category	Li Xian	Nominated	
Asia Contents Awards	2020	Best Actor	Li Xian	Nominated	
Asia Contents Awards	2020	Best Design Production	Sword Dynasty	Nominated	
Weibo TV Series Awards	2020	Popular Actor of the Year	Li Xian	Shortlisted	
Weibo TV Series Awards	2020	Popular TV Series of the Year	Sword Dynasty	Shortlisted	
