= Xiao Yan (actress) =

Chinese actress born 1997

- Born: 6 March 1997 (age 29); Guizhou, China
- Other name: Shane
- Education: Civil Aviation Flight University of China
- Occupation: Actress
- Years active: 2015–present
- Agent: Gramarie (果然娱乐)

Chinese name
- Simplified Chinese: 肖燕
Transcriptions

Xiao Yan (Chinese: 肖燕; born 6 March 1997) is a Chinese actress.

== Career ==
In 2015, Xiao Yan made her acting debut in the television series A Detective Housewife.

In 2016, Xiao played her first leading role in the web film Princess & Her 49 Servants.

In 2017, Xiao gained recognition for her performance in the youth campus drama Hot Blooded Goddess. She then starred in the wuxia drama The Lost Swordship, and sang the theme song of the drama titled "Gaze".

In 2019, Xiao became known to the broad audience after her roles as Qin Zhiyan in the xianxia drama The Legends, and as Green Snake (Xiao Qing) in the web series adaptation of the folktale legend The Legend of White Snake. The same year, she featured in fantasy drama L.O.R.D. Critical World.

In 2020, Xiao starred in the period detective drama My Roommate is a Detective alongside Hu Yitian and Zhang Yunlong, playing a newspaper reporter. The same year, she starred in the Chinese remake of the Singapore period drama The Little Nyonya, playing dual roles as the female lead and the female lead's mother. Xiao also starred in historical romance web drama Marry Me alongside Xing Zhaolin; and featured in romance drama Love is Sweet.

== Filmography ==
=== Film ===
Year	English title	Chinese title	Role	Notes/Ref.
2016	Princess & Her 49 Servants	公主和她的49个男仆	Su Chuang	

=== Television series ===
Year	English title	Chinese title	Role	Network	Notes/Ref.
2016	A Detective Housewife	煮妇神探	Tian Qizi	Zhejiang TV	
2016	I'm Not A Monster	我不是妖怪	Dong Xiaolv	iQiyi	
2016	The Hunting Genius	寻人大师	Xiao Si	iQiyi	Cameo
2017	Hot Blooded Goddess	燃血女神	Tudou Mei	Youku	
2018	The Lost Swordship	飘香剑雨	Tang Chun	iQiyi	
2019	The Legends	招摇	Qin Zhiyan	Hunan TV	
2019	The Legend of White Snake	新白娘子传奇	Xiao Qing	iQiyi	
2019	L.O.R.D. Critical World	爵迹·临界天下	You Hua	iQiyi	
2020	My Roommate is a Detective	民国奇探	Bai Youning	iQiyi	
2020	The Little Nyonya	小娘惹	Ju Xiang / Yue Niang	CCTV	
2020	Marry Me	三嫁惹君心	Ju Mu'er	iQiyi	
2020	Heroes in Harm’s Way	最美逆行者	Xia Fu	CCTV	
2020	Love is Sweet	半是蜜糖半是伤	Xu Li	iQiyi	
2022	Please! 8 Hours	拜托了！8小时	Bai Wei	iQiyi	
2023	Sisterhood	南洋女儿情	Ouyang Tianqing	iQiyi	

== Discography ==
Year	English title	Chinese title	Album	Notes
2018	"Gaze"	相望	The Lost Swordship OST	

== Awards and nominations ==
Year	Award	Category	Nominated work	Results	Ref.
2019	Golden Bud - The Fourth Network Film And Television Festival	Best Newcomer	The Legends, The Legend of White Snake	Nominated	
2019	8th iQiyi All-Star Carnival	Most Promising Artist	—N/a	Won	
