= Fall in Love at First Kiss =

2019 film directed by Frankie Chen

- Theatrical release poster
- Traditional Chinese: 一吻定情
- Simplified Chinese: 一吻定情
- Hanyu Pinyin: Yī wěn dìng qíng
- Directed by: Frankie Chen
- Written by: Zero Huang
- Based on: Itazura na Kiss by Kaoru Tada
- Produced by: Fu Ruoqing
- Starring: Lin Yun; Darren Wang
- Cinematography: Chu Ching-Wei; Yao Hung-i
- Edited by: Wenders Li
- Music by: Hou Chih-chien
- Production companies: New Classics Media; Tianjin Cat Eye Micro Shadow Culture Media; China Film Distribution; Wanda Film and Television; Dangle Entertainment
- Distributed by: Bestpal; Tangren Cultural Film Group (Australia, New Zealand, Canada, United States of America, United Kingdom); RAM Entertainment (Singapore, Malaysia); AUD (South Korea)
- Release date: February 14, 2019
- Running time: 122 minutes
- Countries: Taiwan; China
- Language: Mandarin with occasional English
- Box office: US$24 million

Fall in Love at First Kiss (Chinese: 一吻定情; pinyin: Yī wěn dìng qíng) is a 2019 Chinese–Taiwanese romantic comedy film directed by Frankie Chen. It is based on the manga series Itazura na Kiss and stars Lin Yun as Yuan Xiangqin, a regular schoolgirl from the F class, and Darren Wang as Jiang Zhishu, a smart student in the A class.

== Plot ==
The film opens as Jiang Zhishu is riding on his bike. Yuan Xiangqin walks past Jiang Zhishu and trips on the stairs, taking along Zhishu's phone. As Jiang Zhishu tries to figure how to save Yuan Xiangqin and his phone from breaking, Xiangqin reluctantly grabs on to his tie and their lips meet, signaling their first meeting. She then meets Jiang Zhishu again at a school assembly as he talks about his ongoing project in Boston, and finds out he's an extraordinarily smart person with a 200IQ score in the A class.

Two years later, she is still fawning over Jiang Zhishu, over his social media page. Whilst trying to get rid of the F class for bees, she sees a social media update for his account saying that he's walking back to the A building and hundreds of fans including herself start running. As the A class gate closes, she has an ultimatum to confess to him. Later on in F class, she notices that a fire drill will start, shutting down all technology and thus allowing her to get through the A gate. She runs, finds Jiang Zhishu and confesses, to which he cold-heartedly rejects. All students in the A grade recorded this embarrassing moment and thus make fun of Yuan Xiangqin whilst the principal scolds her for wasting Zhishu's time.

Xiangqin's house later collapses due to poor construction, combined with the previous confession, she is the centre of everyone's attention. As Jiang Zhishu walks past, Xiangqin challenges Zhishu that an F grader can get on the top 100 list for a trial exam. He agrees. Xiangqin moves in to her father's friend's house, without knowing that it is where Jiang Zhishu resides. Over the course of time, Xiangqin and Zhishu get closer through Zhishu's mother where she encourages their relationship and encounters at school and at his house.

To save Xiangqin from embarrassment over not making the top 100, she begs Zhishu to help her study for the mock exam which he reluctantly agrees to due to her having an embarrassing video of his received by his mother. She makes 100th tied, whilst Zhishu still remains 1st. Zhishu and his cohort then embarrasses Xiangqin at an athletics carnival as she is revealed to reside in Zhishu's house, into which she streams the embarrassing video of his at his house. Xiangqin and Zhishu then quarrel before Zhishu kisses Xiangqin on the lips before leaving.

Two years later, Xiangqin is seen to support Zhishu at Zhishu's mother's request but is left out of his life as Zhishu wants to live his own life and become a veterinary doctor. Xiangqin follows Zhishu around, only to see another woman living at his apartment but finds out that she is there for business only. She is relieved and Zhishu kisses Xiangqin one more time before finding out his father becoming sick and thus takes over his business, adding stress and pressure to his life. Caring for Xiangqin but prioritizing the business, he throws away Xiangqin in order to marry another woman to merge their businesses and thus save his father's business. Xiangqin then promptly rejects his love and runs away. Zhishu's father and mother disagree with Zhishu's decision to marry and tells him it should be from his heart whom he should marry.

Another year passes by, and we see Xiangqin looking through Zhishu's social media. Zhishu then posts an update at the school hall in which he will talk at an assembly, in which Xiangqin goes to reluctantly. She then enters the hall and sees that no one is there but him. Zhishu then hides away and Xiangqin calls Zhishu's brother, into which he responds that only certain people can see what he posts. She then realizes that the posts were meant for her. Zhishu then proposes to Xiangqin in which she agrees. A flashback occurs at the end in which Zhishu wakes up from his slumber during his time where he tutors Xiangqin and sees the love letter Xiangqin wrote for him. At that time, the audience finds out that Zhishu was in love with her.

Their subsequent marriage is seen in the post-credits scene.

== Cast ==
- Darren Wang as Jiang Zhishu
- Lin Yun as Yuan Xiangqin
- Kenji Chen as Ah Jin
- Cecilia Choi as Sha Hui
- Christopher Lee as Zhishu's father
- Christy Chung as Zhishu's mother
- Tai Chih-yuan as Xiangqin's father
- Tsai Yi-chen as Li Mei
- This Group Of People as various supporting roles

== Soundtrack ==
- Really Foolish (真的傻) by Lala Hsu
- Proof of Heartbeat (心跳的证明) by Liu Renyu
- I Belong To You by Kuo Shu-yao
- Hundred Ways Of Not Liking You (一百个不喜欢你的方法) by 房东的猫

== Release ==
Fall in Love at First Kiss was released in Taiwan, China, Malaysia, Australia, New Zealand, United States of America, Canada and the United Kingdom on exactly the same day. Tangren Media had the distribution rights to distribute the movie in all Western countries whilst RAM Entertainment had the distribution rights to distribute the movie in Singapore and Malaysia. The movie was then released in South Korea on March 27, 2019, through distributor AUD.

=== Box office ===
As of March 6, 2019, the movie has grossed US$24 million, majority of it being from China and Taiwan.
