= Yu Menglong =

Chinese actor and singer (1988–2025)

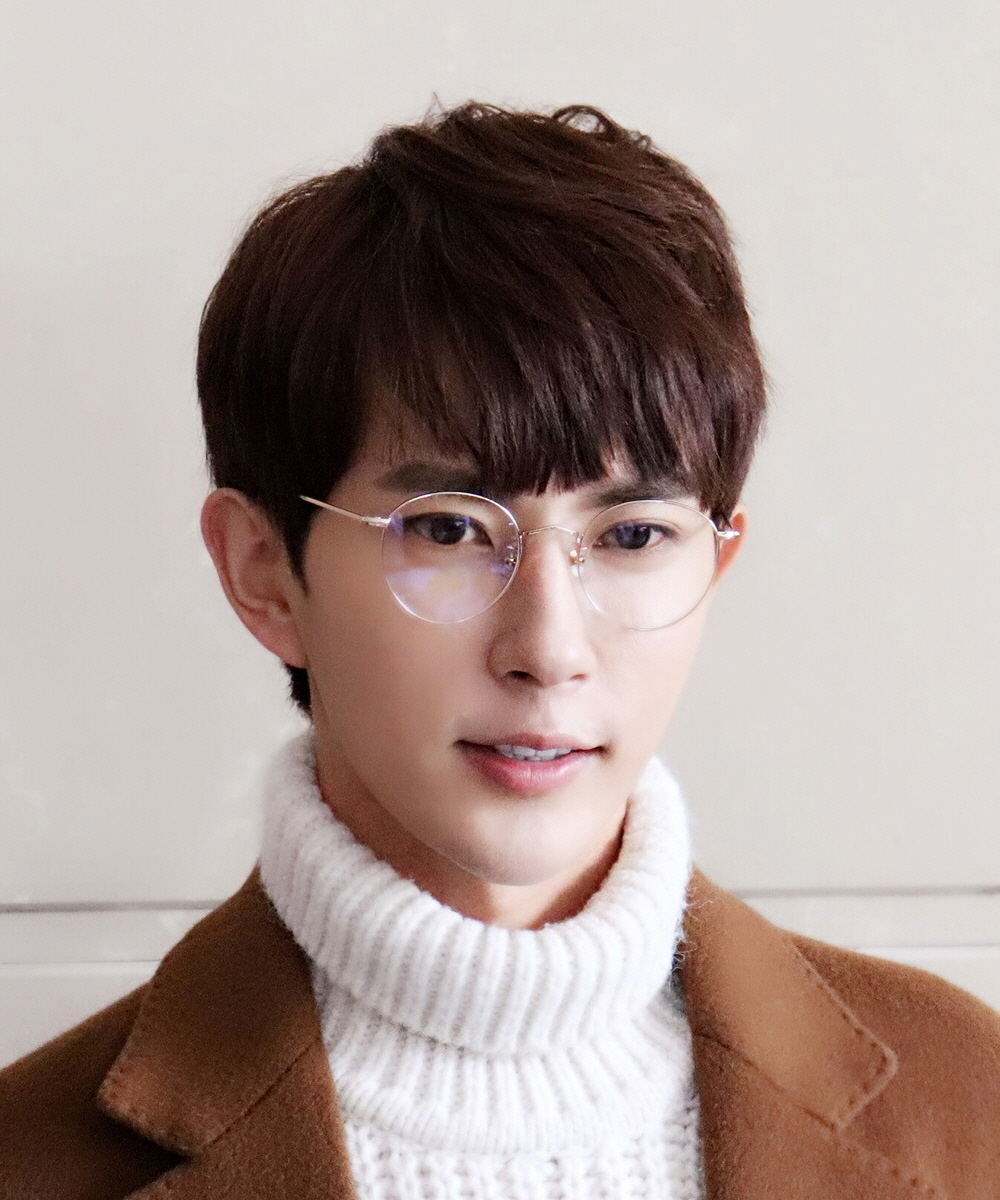
- Yu in 2018
- Born: 15 June 1988; Ürümqi, Xinjiang, China
- Died: 11 September 2025 (aged 37); Beijing, China
- Other name: Alan Yu
- Education: Beijing Institute of Performing Arts
- Occupations: Actor; singer; music video director
- Years active: 2010–2025

Chinese name
- Simplified Chinese: 于朦胧
- Traditional Chinese: 于朦朧
Transcriptions
Standard Mandarin
- Hanyu Pinyin: Yú Ménglóng

Yu Menglong (Chinese: 于朦胧; 15 June 1988 – 11 September 2025), also known as Alan Yu, was a Chinese actor and singer.

His death in September 2025 was ruled accidental by authorities, but the findings were faced with doubts and allegations that there was a cover-up.

== Early life and education ==
Yu was born in Ürümqi, Xinjiang. His mother named him after one of her favorite author's, Chiung Yao, works, Hazy Moon And Hazy Bird. He studied at the affiliated high school of the Beijing Contemporary Music Academy before graduating from the Beijing Performing Arts Training College.

== Career ==
=== Beginnings ===
In 2007, Yu participated in SMG's My Show! My Style!. He emerged in the Top 16 for the Xi'an province. In 2010, Yu joined Hunan STV's Super Boy but was eliminated, and later became a trainee with the boy group Happy Boy Group 8090. The same year, he directed singer Deanna Ding's music video for her single "61 Seconds". In 2011, he made his acting debut in the short film The Little Prince. In 2013, Yu competed in Super Boy again; this time entering and emerging as one of the Top 10 contestants in the final round, after which he signed with EE-Media. The same year, he released his first single titled "Just Nice". In 2014, Yu starred in the short film The Rules, which received the Best Independent Film award at the 4th International Micro Film Festival for University.

=== Rising popularity ===
In 2015, Yu achieved recognition with his role as 9th prince in the popular historical web drama Go Princess Go. The same year, he released his first album, Toy. In 2017, Yu gained increased popularity after starring in the hit fantasy-romance drama Eternal Love. He then starred in the fantasy-action drama Xuan-Yuan Sword: Han Cloud alongside Zhang Yunlong. In 2019, Yu starred in the television adaptation of the Chinese folktale legend Legend of the White Snake as Xu Xian. The same year, Yu starred in modern workplace drama Who's Not Rebellious Youth, and youth sports drama Unstoppable Youth. In 2020, Yu starred in the historical drama The Love Lasts Two Minds. Following the expiration of his contract with EE-Media, Yu left the company and established his own studio to independently manage his acting career and entertainment engagements.

== Death ==
On 11 September 2025, reports circulated on Chinese social media that a man suspected to be Yu had fallen to his death in a residential community in Chaoyang, Beijing earlier that morning. The community's property management later confirmed that a fatal fall had occurred. At 6:44 p.m. the same day, Yu's studio, which had been deregistered in July 2025, issued a statement confirming his death and noting that police had ruled out criminal involvement. Authorities ruled that the death was accidental due to intoxication.

Doubts and conspiracy theories regarding Yu's death spread online. On 16 September, the studio released a second statement in the name of Yu's mother, who was not present at the scene, stating that Yu "accidentally fell to his death after drinking." She added, "I hope everyone will view this incident rationally and stop speculating." On 21 September, the Chaoyang branch of the Beijing Public Security Bureau issued an official bulletin regarding an incident involving Yu. The investigation confirmed that Yu had accidentally fallen after consuming alcohol, ruling out the possibility of a criminal case. The authorities also emphasized that the online spread of rumors would be investigated in accordance with the law, noting that three principal rumor-mongers had already been placed under compulsory measures.

On 24 September, as part of a crackdown following Yu's death, Weibo announced that it had removed more than 100,000 pieces of prohibited content, suspended or closed over 1,000 accounts, and disabled the comment function for more than 15,000 accounts. Fan Shiqi, one of the artists who allegedly had attended the drinking party before Yu's death, faced backlash over the allegations. Promotional materials of an unreleased drama in which Fan played a minor role was removed and his concert in Chengdu reportedly only sold 15 tickets. Fan retained counsel to file lawsuit over the allegations.

== Filmography ==
=== Film ===
Year	English title	Chinese title	Role	Notes	Ref.
2011	Little Prince	纵身一跃		Short film	
2012	The Changing Times	变幻的年代		Short film	
2014	The Rules	丛林游戏	Xiao Xia	Short film	
2014	No Zuo No Die	我就是我	Himself		
2014	Temporary Family	临时同居		Cameo	
2014	Young Adult	成人记2	Calvin		
2015	Dream Come True	一刻十年	Ma Meng		
2015	Love Has Been Here Before	听说爱情回来过	Long Long		
2016	Love Studio	同城邂逅	Tian Hao		
2016	Warrant the Reborn	催命符	Young Master		
2016	For Love to Let Go	为爱放手	Mu Qi		
2017	Intrude The Widow Village at Midnight	夜闯寡妇村	Tan Gang		

=== Television series ===
Year	English title	Chinese title	Role	Ref.
2014	My Loving Home	把爱带回家	Xia Xingchen	
2015	Go Princess Go	太子妃升职记	Ninth Prince	
2017	Eternal Love	三生三世十里桃花	Bai Zhen	
2017	Xuan-Yuan Sword: Han Cloud	轩辕剑外传汉之云	Muyun	
2018	All Out of Love	凉生，我们可不可以不忧伤	Cheng Tianen	

=== Web series ===
Year	English title	Chinese title	Role	Ref.
2019	The Legend of White Snake	新白娘子传奇	Xu Xian	
2019	Who's Not Rebellious Youth	谁的青春不叛逆	Lu Xiang	
2019	Unstoppable Youth	青春抛物线	Fu Anyan	
2020	The Love Lasts Two Minds	两世欢	Jing Ci	
2020	The Moon Brightens For You	明月曾照江东寒	Lin Fang	
2024	A love story of oiled paper umbrella	一伞烟雨	Nan Feng Yi	

=== Television ===
Year	English title	Chinese title	Role	Ref.
2019	I Like You Too	喜欢你，我也是	Cast member	

=== Music video appearances ===
Year	English title	Chinese title	Artist
2010	"61 Seconds"	61秒	Deanna Ding
2011	"Warm Happiness"	幸福余温	Huang Zhibo
2012	"Under the Flowers and Moon"	花前月下	Wang Qingqing
2012	"Hidden Regret"	暗藏后悔	Zing Chou
2014	"An Unchanging Promise"	不变的承诺	Yoyo Lee
2015	"Go Home and have the Spring Festival"	回家过年吧	Himself with others
2015	"Sleep Walk"	梦游	Himself
2016	"Gaze"	凝视	Himself
2018	"Mirror"	镜	Himself

== Discography ==
=== Albums ===
Year	English title	Chinese title	Ref.
2015	Toy	玩具	
2017	Yu Meng Long	于朦胧	

=== Singles ===
Year	English title	Chinese title	Album	Notes	Ref.
2011	"The Little Prince"	纵身一跃	The Little Prince OST	with Cho Hye-sun	
2013	"Whirlpool"	漩涡	Lost World	with Sandee Peng	
2013	"Chasing dream with a Child-like Heart"	追梦赤子心	Theme song of Super Boy 2013		
2013	"Just Nice"	刚好	Do You Dare to Chase Your Dream		
2014	"Every Star"	每一颗星辰	No Zuo No Die OST		
2015	"Go Home and have the Spring Festival"	回家过年吧			
2015	"This Is Me"	就这Young	Theme song of Super Boy 2015		
2015	"Father and Mother"	老爸老妈			
2015	"Sleep Walk"	梦游			
2016	"Gaze"	凝视			
2017	"Half"	一半	Xuan-Yuan Sword: Han Cloud OST		
2018	"Mirror"	镜			
2018	"The Future Me"	未来已来		Project for 40th anniversary of economic reform	
2019	"Yue Meng Long Niao Meng Long"	月朦胧鸟朦胧			
2020	"Live Up to the Prime of Youth"	不负韶华		with Li Qin	

== Bibliography ==
Year	English title	Chinese title	Ref.
2014	A Gift Meets Yu Meng Long	礼物遇见于朦胧	

== Awards and nominations ==
Year	Award	Category	Nominated work	Result	Ref.
2017	Asian Music Gala 2017	Most Popular All-Rounded Artist	—N/a	Won	
2017	Weibo TV Online Video Award Ceremony	New Artist Award	—N/a	Won	
2018	3rd China Television Drama Quality Ceremony	Quality New Star Award	—N/a	Won	
2019	Golden Bud – The Fourth Network Film And Television Festival	Best Actor	The Legend of White Snake, Who's Not Rebellious Youth	Nominated	
2019	Golden Bud – The Fourth Network Film And Television Festival	Breakthrough Actor of the Year	The Legend of White Snake, Who's Not Rebellious Youth	Won	
2019	iFeng Fashion Choice Awards	Fashion Aura of the Year	—N/a	Won	
