= Twenty-Four Hours (TV series) =

- 二十四小时
- Genre: Variety show; Reality show
- Directed by: Cao Xiaozhen
- Starring: Lin Zhiying; Shawn Yue; Bai Jingting; Wei Daxun; Hu Yitian; Chen Kun; Han Geng; Leo Wu; Xiong Ziqi; Lin Yun
- Country of origin: China
- Original language: Chinese
- No. of seasons: 3
- No. of episodes: 34

Production
- Production locations: China; Dubai; Hongkong; Vietnam
- Running time: 90 minutes
- Production companies: The Great Tang Dynasty; Sun Moon Star Media

Original release
- Network: Zhejiang Television
- Release: 22 January 2016 – 14 April 2018

Twenty-Four Hours (Chinese: 二十四小时) is a Chinese outdoor reality show which started in 2016 on Zhejiang Television. It is a large-scale outdoor game-variety show where cast members attempt to complete missions to find a mysterious item. It features an overarching plot during each season. In 2018, it ranked among the "Top 3 Chinese Competition Programs".

== Plot ==
- Season 1

Within 24 hours, two teams must uncover the "master of the star" and the hidden star by completing tasks. Secretly, at least one member is assigned as the "master" with a separate mission. If the team correctly identifies the master, they earn a star; if not, the master earns two.

- Season 2

Time-space sailors traveled the world to retrieve the scattered tokens of the "Goddess of the Sea." The captain system was removed, and before each mission, one or more sailors were secretly assigned special identities with tasks to complete within 24 hours.

- Season 3

Inspired by Zheng He's voyages, seven sailors retraced the Maritime Silk Road to find scattered stars and escape the eye of the storm. Led by captains Jimmy Lin and Shawn Yue, members secretly took on star-owner roles with hidden tasks to complete within 24 hours.

== Casts ==
- Current Cast
  - Lin Zhiying
  - Yu Wenle
  - Wei Daxun
  - Xiong Ziqi
  - Bai Jingting
  - Hu Yitian
  - Lin Yun
- Former Cast
  - Chen Kun
  - Xu Zheng
  - Han Geng
  - Leo Wu
  - Da Zhangwei
  - Dong Li
  - Zhou Yu
  - Dapeng
  - Yin Zheng

== Seasons ==
Season	Episodes	Originally aired	
Season	Episodes	Premiere	Finale
Season 1	12	January 22, 2016	April 8, 2016
Season 2	10	February 3, 2017	April 7, 2017
Season 3	12	February 2, 2018	April 14, 2018

== Episodes ==
=== Season 1 ===
Episode	Date	Guests	Location	Teams	Tasks	Results	Star Amounts
1	22 January 2016	An Yixuan Jiang Xin	Thailand	Master of the Star: Chen Kun Good-Looking Team: Chen Kun, Han Geng, Wu Lei, Jiang Xin Laughing Team: Xu Zheng, Dapeng, Yin Zheng, An Yixuan	Master of the Star: Make your team lose and remain hidden	Chen Kun Wins	Chen Kun-2 Han Geng-0 Wu Lei-0 Xu Zheng-0 Dapeng-0 Yin Zheng-0
2	29 January 2016	An Yixuan Jiang Xin	Thailand	Master of the Star: Chen Kun Good-Looking Team: Chen Kun, Han Geng, Wu Lei, Jiang Xin Laughing Team: Xu Zheng, Dapeng, Yin Zheng, An Yixuan	Master of the Star: Make your team lose and remain hidden	Chen Kun Wins	Chen Kun-2 Han Geng-0 Wu Lei-0 Xu Zheng-0 Dapeng-0 Yin Zheng-0
3	5 February 2016	Chen Qiaoen, Zhang Yuqi	Singapore	Master of the Star: Dapeng Good-Looking Team: Chen Kun, Han Geng, Wu Lei, Chen Qiaoen 'Laughing Team: Xu Zheng, Dapeng, Yin Zheng, Zhang Yuqi Xu Zheng, Dapeng, Yin Zheng, Zhang Yuqi	Master of the Star: Make your team lose and remain hidden	Han Geng, Wu Lei, Chen Qiaoen Win (Chen Qiaoen gave her star to Xu Zheng)	Chen Kun-2 Han Geng-1 Wu Lei-1 Xu Zheng-1 Dapeng-0 Yin Zheng-0
4	12 February 2016	Chen Qiaoen, Zhang Yuqi	Singapore	Master of the Star: Dapeng Good-Looking Team: Chen Kun, Han Geng, Wu Lei, Chen Qiaoen 'Laughing Team: Xu Zheng, Dapeng, Yin Zheng, Zhang Yuqi Xu Zheng, Dapeng, Yin Zheng, Zhang Yuqi	Master of the Star: Make your team lose and remain hidden	Han Geng, Wu Lei, Chen Qiaoen Win (Chen Qiaoen gave her star to Xu Zheng)	Chen Kun-2 Han Geng-1 Wu Lei-1 Xu Zheng-1 Dapeng-0 Yin Zheng-0
5	19 February 2016	Lin Xinru, Wang Zhi	Dubai	Master of the Star:Xu Zheng, Lin Xinru Good-Looking Team: Chen Kun, Han Geng, Wu Lei, Wang Zhi Laughing Team: Xu Zheng, Dapeng, Yin Zheng, Lin Xinru	Master of the Star: Make your team lose and remain hidden	Xu Zheng, Lin Xinru Win Lin Xinru gave her star to Yin Zheng, and Xu Zheng gave his star to Dapeng.	Chen Kun-2 Han Geng-1 Wu Lei-1 Xu Zheng-3 Dapeng-1 Yin Zheng-1
6	26 February 2016	Lin Xinru, Wang Zhi	Dubai	Master of the Star:Xu Zheng, Lin Xinru Good-Looking Team: Chen Kun, Han Geng, Wu Lei, Wang Zhi Laughing Team: Xu Zheng, Dapeng, Yin Zheng, Lin Xinru	Master of the Star: Make your team lose and remain hidden	Xu Zheng, Lin Xinru Win Lin Xinru gave her star to Yin Zheng, and Xu Zheng gave his star to Dapeng.	Chen Kun-2 Han Geng-1 Wu Lei-1 Xu Zheng-3 Dapeng-1 Yin Zheng-1
7	4 March 2016	Zhang Junning, Yilin	Czech Republic	Master of the Star:Han Geng, Chen Kun, Wu Lei Flower Boys Team: Xu Zheng, Han Geng, Wu Lei, Zhang Junning Old Artists Team: Chen Kun, Dapeng, Yin Zheng, Yilin	Master of the Star: Make sure Chen Kun's team wins, and Han Geng's team loses, and remain hidden.	Han Geng, Chen Kun, Wu Win	Chen Kun-4 Han Geng-3 Wu Lei Xu Zheng-3 Dapeng-1 Yin Zheng-1
8	11 March 2016	Zhang Junning, Yilin	Czech Republic	Master of the Star:Han Geng, Chen Kun, Wu Lei Flower Boys Team: Xu Zheng, Han Geng, Wu Lei, Zhang Junning Old Artists Team: Chen Kun, Dapeng, Yin Zheng, Yilin	Master of the Star: Make sure Chen Kun's team wins, and Han Geng's team loses, and remain hidden.	Han Geng, Chen Kun, Wu Win	Chen Kun-4 Han Geng-3 Wu Lei Xu Zheng-3 Dapeng-1 Yin Zheng-1
9	18 March 2016	Xi Mengyao, Zhang Lanxin, Zhang Li, Lin Yun, Liu Yan, Wang Zhi	Hainan	Master of the Star:Han Geng and Zhang Li Fish Love Dapeng and Xi Mengyao Proud Mutton Xu Zheng and Zhang Lanxin Red and Green Beef Han Geng and Zhang Li Invincible Shrimp Meat Wu Lei and Lin Yun Snow Beef Chen Kun and Liu Yan Girl Marrow Yin Zheng and Wang Zhi	Master of the Star: Find your true love and stamp the paper first.	Han Geng, Zhang Li Win	Chen Kun-4 Han Geng-5 Wu Lei-3 Xu Zheng-3 Dapeng-1 Yin Zheng-1
10	25 March 2016	Xi Mengyao, Zhang Lanxin, Zhang Li, Lin Yun, Liu Yan, Wang Zhi	Hainan	Master of the Star:Chen Kun, Han Geng, Xu Zheng, Wu Lei, Dapeng True Master of the Star: Yin Zheng Chen Kun and Wang Zhi Xu Zheng and Zhang Lanxin Han Geng and Zhang Li Wu Lei and Liu Yan Yin Zheng and Lin Yun Dapeng and Xi Mengyao	Master of the Star: Rescue your true love and stand on the stage first. True Master of the Star: Eliminate all of the Masters of the Star to become the true Master of the Star.	Yin Zheng, Lin Yun Win	Chen Kun-4 Han Geng-5 Wu Lei-3 Xu Zheng-3 Dapeng-1 Yin Zheng-3
11	1 April 2016	Da Zhangwei, Bai Jingting	Shanghai	Thief:Dapeng Good-Looking Team: Chen Kun, Han Geng, Wu Lei, Bai Jingting Laughing Team: Xu Zheng, Dapeng, Yin Zheng, Da Zhangwei	Thief: Eat two of the member's chocolates without being caught.	Dapeng Wins	Chen Kun-4 Han Geng-5 Wu Lei-3 Xu Zheng-3 Dapeng-1 Yin Zheng-3
12	8 April 2016	No guests	Chaotian Palace	Darkness Star:Xu Zheng No Teams	Darkness Star: Eliminate all other sailors.	Xu Zheng Wins	Yin Zheng is the final winner

== Viewership and rankings ==
=== Season 3 ===
Based on China Zhejiang Satellite TV Premiere Ratings.

Episodes	Original Broadcast Date	CSM52			CSM National Network			CSM National Network		
Episodes	Original Broadcast Date	Ratings	Ratings	Ranking	Ratings	Ratings	Ranking	Ratings	Ratings	Ranking
1	February 2, 2018	0.971	5.833	6	0.47	3.35	13	0.444	3.187	8
2	February 9, 2018	1.13	6.195	4	0.68	4.25	7	0.657	4.153	5
3	February 16, 2018	0.796	3.798	9	0.62	3.18	10	0.645	3.27	7
4	February 19, 2018	0.906	4.36	5	0.53	2.68	13	0.566	2.936	3
5	February 23, 2018	1.044	5.74	4	0.61	3.84	8	0.498	3.149	7
6	March 2, 2018	0.912	4.52	9	0.59	3.32	8	0.529	3.11	5
7	March 9, 2018	0.832	5.05	9	0.5	3.59	13	0.47	3.417	8
8	March 16, 2018	1.057	6.019	3	0.54	3.67	10	0.649	4.43	4
9	March 23, 2018	1.021	5.578	4	0.56	3.63	10	0.557	3.57	6
10	March 30, 2018	0.962	6.072	4	0.58	4.52	11	0.463	3.724	7
11	April 6, 2018	0.951	5.783	5	0.57	4.32	12	0.427	3.286	7
12	April 14, 2018	0.501	2.693	14	0.32	1.91	20	0.402	2.47	7
Overall		0.924	5.137	—N/a	0.55	3.52	—N/a	0.526	3.392	—N/a
