= List of Go Go Squid! episodes =

Go Go Squid! (Chinese: 亲爱的，热爱的; pinyin: Qin Ai De, Re Ai De) is a 2019 Chinese television series starring Yang Zi and Li Xian The series is about how Tong Nian, a talented computer major who is also a popular online singer and Han Shangyan, a cybersecurity professional fall in love, support each other and strive to win prizes in international cybersecurity competitions.

== Episodes ==
Episode	Original Air Date	Synopsis	Dragon Television (Note: CSM National TV Ranking)			Zhejiang Television		
Episode	Original Air Date	Synopsis	Ratings	Audience share	Ranking	Ratings	Audience share	Ranking
1	July 9, 2019	Wearing a black sportswear and carrying a sports bag, Han Shangyan walked to the counter and attracted Tong Nian, who was in charge of the Internet cafe. Tong Nian saw Han Shangyan for a moment and fell in love with this unknown man at first sight. She wanted to know Han Shangyan, but she was too shy to speak. She could only use the Internet cafe lottery as an excuse to get Han Shangyan's WeChat account. And repeatedly told Han Shangyan to pay attention to Internet cafes regularly, there will be various benefits, welcome Han Shangyan to patronize again. Han Shangyan didn't care about the girl who was responsible for collecting money. After spending most of the night in the Internet cafe, he calmed down and returned to the club to start an intensive preparation training. Tong Nian sent WeChat to the Han Shangyan for many times in the name of the Internet cafe micro-signal to forecast the weather and make online reservations, but Han Shangyan ignored it.	0.41	1.96	10	0.46	2.24	8
2	July 10, 2019	Tong Nian was sad because she could not get in touch with Han Shangyan. At this time, her cousin Hu Dounan helped to find the name of the game account that Han Shangyan played in the Internet cafe, and found an available premium account for Tong Nian to teach how to use it. Tong Nian went online and added the account name used by Han Shangyan in Internet cafes. In fact, this is the account of Shen Zhe(Grunt), a member of the Han Shangyan team. It happened that Han Shangyan was also borrowing this account. Child, so take care of her to play together.	0.27	1.21	9	0.53	2.36	6
3	July 10, 2019	Tong Nian entered the field to see Han Shangyan, and Han Shangyan also recognized Tong Nian. After the two oolongs had a conversation, Han Nianyan wanted to leave Tong Nian to grab his clothing corner. This scene was seen by the team members on stage, and everyone mistakenly thought Tong Nian is Han Shangyan's girlfriend. When Tong Nian left the court, she heard fans talking about Grunt's stomach bleeding. Tong Nian had always mistakenly thought that Grunt was the ID of Han Shangyan, so she rushed into the rest area of the stadium again to find Grunt. The team members mistook Tong Nian for their sister-in-law (Han Shangyan's girlfriend) and took her to the lounge. In the lounge, Tong Nian and real Grunt (Shen Zhe) looked at each other and asked each other who they were. Han Shangyan misunderstood that Tong Nian was Shen Zhe ’s girlfriend, and Shen Zhe delayed training because of his relationship, but neither of them knew each other.	0.27	1.21	9	0.53	2.36	6
4	July 11, 2019	With only 20 minutes left until the end of the restaurant's meal, Han Shangyan led Tong Nian to the hotel restaurant for dinner. Dai Feng was encountered in the elevator by Han Shangyan giving Tong Nian a picture of eating sweets, so the association flew. At the restaurant, Han Shangyan explained the misunderstanding to Su Cheng and asked Su Cheng to help arrange the car to send Tong Nian back to the hotel. Tong Nian dined in the restaurant, worried that she wouldn’t be embarrassed to eat because of his food, so she took some vegetable salad to deal with it. Han Shangyan was afraid of having a cold meal, so he found Ling Shan and Dai Feng to chat with each other. He learned that Tong Nian was a postgraduate student, and was also a well-known Internet singer.	0.36	1.6	7	0.54	2.37	6
5	July 11, 2019	Blueberry's (Tong Nian's friend) husband told Tong Nian that KK team had a game, and let Blueberry accompany her to watch. But because there were no tickets, they can only be blocked outside the stadium. When k & k players enter the field, Xiao Feng, a member of the team, saw Tong Nian in the crowd. Had to acquiesce. At the game, Han Shangyan met his former teammates, but he always ignored them expressionlessly.	0.36	1.6	7	0.54	2.37	6
6	July 12, 2019	Han Shangyan stayed alone in the upper room. Recalling that ten years ago, Wang Hao and Ai Qing received Han Shangyan from the courtyard house. After everyone introduced each other, Han Shangyan pulled on Ai Qing to learn programming techniques. The winners had chicken legs to eat. The days at the Beijing Siheyuan are very difficult. Everyone squeezed into a small room. Han Shangyan, Ou Qiang and Xiaomi had a bed. Ai Qing slept alone across a curtain. Wang Hao slept on the sofa. Despite the hardships, everyone was full of fighting spirit and full of confidence. Persevere for your dreams. In the early days of the team's game, the performance of the Solo team has been unsatisfactory. In the game with the Buff team, they lost the battle again. After the game, the Solo team members were scolded by fans. The sponsorship originally negotiated by the Solo team was also broken by the other party. Wang Hao and Han Shangyan discussed and decided to transfer the team to Shanghai for development.	0.44	1.9	5	0.72	3.21	3
7	July 12, 2019	On New Year's Eve, Han Shangyan and Wu Bai received Grandpa Han who came back from Norway at the airport. Grandpa Han threatened to lure Han Shangyan to a blind date. The original one was Tong Nian's family, and the blind date was Tong Nian's big cousin. Tong Nian felt embarrassed after meeting with Han Shangyan by coincidence, pretending not to know Han Shangyan. On the way to the New Year's Eve dinner with Grandpa Han, the whole family arranged for Tong Nian to take Han Shangyan's car with his cousin so as not to be embarrassed by a cousin and Han Shangyan alone. Han Shangyan in the car told Tong Nian's cousin that he did not intend to have a girlfriend. The blind date was also arranged by his grandfather. Han Shangyan made it clear that he had finished the meal with his family and said that Tong Nian did not need to pretend not to know him. After getting off the car, Han Shangyan explained to Tong Nian that he wanted to end the blind date arrangement as soon as possible and not to misunderstand her.	0.44	1.9	5	0.72	3.21	3
8	July 13, 2019	On the New Year's Day, Grandpa Han deliberately asked Han Shangyan to take Tong Nian for a dinner at home in order to increase the relationship between Han Shangyan and Tong Nian. Grandpa and Dai Feng and Tong Nian chatted together. After knowing that Tong Nian was good at singing, he asked Tong Nian to sing a song, which caused Han Shangyan in the house to squint. Grandpa Han felt that Tong Nian is good, cute and kind. Grandpa Han prepared a necklace marked with the surname of Han Shangyan and let Han Shangyan wrap it into dumplings to surprise Tong Nian. Han Shangyan led this task reluctantly. In the eyes of everyone, Tong Nian finished eating dumplings and did not notice at all that Grandpa Han was anxious. At that time, Han Shangyan took out the necklace box and told Tong Nian that Grandpa asked him to give it. Tong Nian happily accepted the gift.	0.45	2.25	6	0.58	3.1	4
9	July 14, 2019	K & K and SP, as the two big clubs invited by China, temporarily formed the Chinese team to Norway to participate in the All-Star Individual Invitation. Ai Qing was dissatisfied with Wang Hao's evasion of reality and could not dispel the suspicions with Han Shangyan. He also lamented that he still felt very guilty about Han Shangyan. Han Shangyan registered NetEase Cloud for Tong Nian and paid attention to Tong Nian's NetEase Cloud account. Han Shangyan left his mobile phone number in the comment area under Tong Nian's post, and informed Tong Nian of his return information in a unique way, which caused a heated discussion between fans on both sides. Tong Nian felt very sweet.	0.51	2.31	5	0.64	2.9	4
10	July 14, 2019	Han Shangyan hurried back and punched the drunk man. Ai Qing persuaded that he should not use his fist to solve every problem. Han Shangyan was deeply frustrated. Thinking of hitting Wang Hao with his fist ten years ago, Mi Shaofei arrived to resolve the dispute. Han Shangyan left in a guilty tone. Back at the hotel, Mi Shaofei delivered the birthday cake and coffee prepared by Ai Qing to Han Shangyan, as well as the sterilized cotton balls and band-aid prepared by Han Shangyan to Han Shangyan's room and persuaded Han Shangyan to forgive Wang Hao and Ai Qing. Tong Nian's birthday greeting message sent at this time made Han Shangyan feel relieved. Han Shangyan asked Mi Shaofei to accompany him on his birthday. In the singles match in Norway, Mi Shaofei suffered a defeat in the world's second-ranked Naya. Mi Shaofei lost the game and the mood was low. Han Shangyan encouraged Mi Shaofei to continue to work hard to stick to his dream.	0.51	2.31	5	0.64	2.9	4
11	July 15, 2019	Han Shangyan looked at Tong Nian when deleting photos. Tong Nian released the voice of blueberry hair just because of tension and misoperation. Tong Nian encouraged Tong Nian to pursue Han Shang Yan confidently. Tong Nian blushed because of his appearance. During lunch with his teammates, Dai Feng was named by Han Shangyan because his words were so slow. Tong Nian took the opportunity to propose to Han Hanyan an upgraded version of the hand-speed measurement software. Han Shangyan heard Tong Nian's software operation concept analysis and looked at Tong Nian. Tong Nian was very happy to receive the task, and he completed the hand-speed measurement software overnight.	0.69	3.12	5	0.86	3.84	1
12	July 15, 2019	Han Shangyan said that there was no drink in the refrigerator, only beer, so he took out two cans of beer and gave Tong Nian a can. In order to show that he was an adult, Tong Nian drank a can of beer in front of Han Shang Yan and never drank Tong. He was drunk in a can of beer every year and began to haunt Han Shangyan. Tong Nian asked Han Shangyan whether she likes the software Han Shangyan or not? She took the rain to pick up at the airport. Does Han Shangyan like it? Question why Han Shangyan didn't say a word like it. After being drunk, Tong Nian got his hands on Han Shangyan. In order to coax Tong Nian's quietness, Han Shangyan gave Tong Nian a precious necklace that he helped Han Qianmu take. Han Shangyan looked for Tong Nian bags and found a mobile phone to get in touch with Tong Nian ’s friends, and found that the strategy of the network security contest that was always carried in Tong Nian bags, and found that the handsome guy who used to play games with himself on the Internet was Tong Nian, Han Shang Yan To warm-up for Tong Nian's intentions, start to move.	0.69	3.12	5	0.86	3.84	1
13	July 16, 2019	Tong Nian was ashamed of the behavior of the previous night. He sent WeChat to Han Shangyan to say sorry. Han Shangyan didn't have time to reply to Tong Nian. He immediately felt ashamed. He immediately added a WeChat to break up. Han Shangyan insisted on his face to say yes, and he felt a bit lost. Tong Nian burst into tears. Tong Father and Tong Mother saw Tong Nian being sad because of breaking up and consoling Tong Nian. After falling out of love, Tong Nian was in a low mood and wanted to cry whenever he could. He told Yaya that he never expected any more, and never saw Han Shangyan again. Dai Feng was sad and depressed because his parents divorced him, and Han Shangyan was depressed because of his love affair. The two comforted each other and laughed a lot	0.63	2.67	6	0.91	3.89	1
14	July 16, 2019	Tong Nian and Blueberry were invited to sing the theme song of the Cyber Security Contest. Tong Nian met the late judge Han Shangyan at the audition. Both of them were surprised by the unexpected encounter. Han Shangyan was very indifferent. Han Shangyan named him and asked Tong Nian to sing "Little Donkey" with her emotionally-loving people as she said. Tong Nian's emotional singing won applause. Wang Hao looked at their problems. At the end of the audition, the host, General Manager, announced the results. Tong Nian and Blueberry were determined to be the theme song singers. They asked Han Shangyan for their opinions. Han Shangyan said with a bad face that Tong Nian was not suitable for the theme song style, but his own opinions can not be used for reference.	0.63	2.67	6	0.91	3.89	1
15	July 17, 2019	Tong Nian came to Han Shangyan, and when he chatted with Grandpa Han, he expressed his understanding and support to Han Shangyan's career with his grandfather, and recite it to his grandfather. He reiterated his declaration of retirement ten years ago. Grandpa Han also admitted that he really understands that the industry he is engaged in is social progress. Emerging industries will understand and support Korean businesses in the future. Grandpa Han said that he also found that Tong and Tong were not particularly satisfied with Han Shangyan, and hoped that they would work together to obtain parental support. When Han Shangyan heard it upstairs, his heart was deeply touched, and he began to face his emotions towards Tong Nian. Han Shangyan officially introduced himself to Tong Nian and said that he was a person who did not know how to fall in love. He asked whether Tong Nian would choose to break up. Tong Nian said he did not want to break up and the two were reconciled.	0.63	2.81	6	0.88	3.96	1
16	July 17, 2019	Han Shangyan, who is extremely inexperienced in dealing with feelings, asks Shen Zhe, who is experienced in love, what he can do to give a girl a sense of security. After being taught, Han Shangyan asked Dai Feng to book a hotel for Tong Nian, and asked Tong Nian to go to Sanya for a weekend together. In fact, it was to let Tong Nian stay with him and believe in himself. Han Shangyan asked Tong Nian to ask for an ID number, and quickly helped her book a flight ticket and hotel. Tong Nian interrogated who was the girl in the Han Shangyan video. Han Shangyan said that he encountered a neuropathy. Tong Nian came to Sanya and saw Zhou Shan who had been entangled with Han Shangyan in the hotel lobby. Tong Nian saw Zhou Shan immediately entered a state of combat readiness and flew to Han Shangyan to declare his sovereignty.	0.63	2.81	6	0.88	3.96	1
17	July 18, 2019	Zhou Shan kindly invited Tong Nian to have dinner together, and Tong Nian repeatedly failed to deal with his resignation. During the meal, Zhou Shan showed off how he understands how Han Shangyan can help Han Shangyan's cause. Tong Nian is also not weak, indicating that both parties have seen their parents, and the parents of both parties have a New Year ’s Eve dinner together. Han Shangyan cared about Tong Nian and found Tong Nian according to the location of his mobile phone. He happened to see Zhou Shan running against Tong Nian. Han Shangyan helped Tong Nian to pull back around, and Zhou Shan left. Han Shangyan and Tong Nian walked on the beach and met Su Cheng and Wang Hao in a quarrel to discuss Xiao Ai's upbringing problem. Tong Nian learned from Han Shangyan the story of Su Cheng and Wang Hao's past years.	0.61	2.78	6	0.99	4.51	1
18	July 18, 2019	During the Internet cafe training, Zhou Shan happened to patrol and record the practice results of the team members. Tong Nian was jealous and was teased by Han Shangyan. During his break, Tong Nian chatted with Han Shangyan about the neural network technology he was studying. Tong Nian's professional ability burst into admiration. Tong Nian proposed that he wanted to see Han Shangyan play the cybersecurity contest. Han Shangyan asked Ling Shan to compare with each other. Ling Shan was aggrieved but he could only choose the contest title to compete with Han Shangyan. Tong Nian rejoiced when he saw the infamous look of Han Ziyan in the Han Shangyan competition. He was convinced that this was what he loved, and the feelings of the two quickly heated up.	0.61	2.78	6	0.99	4.51	1
19	July 19, 2019	Sun Yaya refused to believe that Tong Nian's boyfriend would be the founder of the cybersecurity competition, Han Shangyan. She wanted to verify the real identity of Han Shangyan by playing a computer through an online chat. After logging in to the client, Sun Yaya was speechless in the face of Han Shangyan and K & K masters Shen Zhe and Ling Shan. Han Shangyan separately invited Tong Nian to leave the group chat to play the game. In the game, Han Shangyan patiently taught Tong Nian how to walk and use firearms. Tong Nian jumped awkwardly, Han Shangyan smiled. Tong Nian asked Han Shangyan if he thought he was learning too slowly, and Han Shangyan shook his head indulgently.	0.67	2.98	5	1.1	5.02	1
20	July 19, 2019	Yaya sent WeChat to ask Mi Shaofei what Han Shangyan likes. Tong Nian went to the club to find Han Shangyan and gave him a little milk cat. Tong Nian talked about leaking and specifically asked Mi Shaofei before he thought of giving Han Shangyan a little milk cat. Tong Nian reluctantly separates from Han Shangyan, the club members stand in the corridor and watch the excitement. Tong Nian left a letter to Han Shangyan. Han Shangyan opened it and saw a card and a stack of photos. Han Shangyan looked at the photos and recalled the years he spent with Wang Hao, Mi Shaofei, and Ou Qiang.	0.67	2.98	5	1.1	5.02	1
21	July 20, 2019	Grandpa Han asked Han Shangyan if he broke up with Tong Nian. Han Shangyan did not answer positively. To help Han Shangyan get his girlfriend back, Grandpa Han took Han Shangyan to visit Tongnian's house. In Tongnian's home, Grandpa Han saw the filial and obedient Zheng Hui and felt deeply in crisis. Regardless of her age and past experience, Tong Mu was very disgusted with Han Shangyan. Outside Tong Nian's door, Tong Mu and Han Shangyan made an appointment and asked him to break up with Tong Nian. Han Shangyan listened to Tong Nian's mother's meal and couldn't bear to hurt Tong Nian's mother's unlimited care for her daughter, so she agreed not to associate with Tong Nian. Tong Nian went out to look for Han Shangyan, who avoided it.	0.61	3.02	4	1.07	5.35	1
22	July 21, 2019	Before going to bed, Tong Nian issued a micro-channel apology to Han Shangyan. Han Shangyan pretended to respond coldly. In the middle of the night, Han Shangyan couldn't sleep outside Tong Nian's house and looked far into Tong Nian's room. The security guard found that Han Shangyan was an infatuated person and encouraged him to pursue his face with a cheek. Han Shangyan told Dai Feng that he did not need a domestic mobile phone after he went to Norway. Before going to the airport, Han Shangyan passed Tong Nian's house and saw Tong Nian go out for a while. Tong Nian was unable to contact Han Shangyan and came to the club to learn that Han Shangyan had gone abroad. After Han Shangyan arrived in Norway, the Korean stepmother asked if the necklace was given to the girl. Han Shangyan did not deny it. The queen mother was happy to show Han Shangyan her dowry that year, and intended to give these jewelry to Han Shangyan's girlfriend. Han Shangyan's expression was dim, and Han's mother-in-law knew that he was not emotional.	0.68	2.99	5	1.01	4.48	1
23	July 21, 2019	Mi Shaofei, Tong Nian and Yaya came to the K & K club. Tong Nian told Han Shangyan that Mi Shaofei was here and wanted to meet him. Tong Nian and Yaya worried that the two would fight, but Han Shangyan and Mi Shaofei just met and went to drink together. In the evening, four people have dinner. In the small restaurant, Mi Shaofei was drunk and regretted that he retired young and frantic and lost his golden age forever. Yaya comforted him to relieve him. Han Shangyan lied to the question that Tong had not been in contact for many days. He claimed that he went to Norway for a blind date, claiming that the two were not suitable for the chicken and the duck, so she should not be entangled. Tong Nian left the restaurant crying.	0.68	2.99	5	1.01	4.48	1
24	July 22, 2019	Han Shangyan didn't say anything, he was still very worried about Tong Nian, and then called the blueberry husband and said he had something to find him. Blueberry husband and Blueberry went to meet Han Shangyan together. After meeting, Han Shangyan asked Blueberry and Blueberry husband to help take care of Tong Nian and gave a sum of money. Although it is very small, it is all the savings of Han Shangyan. Blueberry was very dissatisfied with Han Shangyan. He broke up twice with Tong Nian in three months and refused to accept it. Han Shangyan did not get back and left. Blueberry eventually gave the money to Tong Nian. Tong Nian blamed blueberry for not receiving it. Hurry to the airport, return the money to Han Shangyan, and tell him that even if she breaks up, she will continue to support his career and cheer for him. Han Shangyan led the team members away and told Shannang to help Tongnian call a car. And he came back to look at the figure of Tong Nian outside the airport, not in his heart.	0.7	3.06	5	1.08	4.75	1
25	July 22, 2019	Mi Shaofei asked Han Shangyan to be a guest at home, celebrating the joy of moving. Mi Shaofei also invited Tong Nian to be a guest at home, and told Tong Nian that Han Shangyan's feelings for Tong Nian are actually very deep, but he didn't know how to express it correctly. Mi Shaofei awakened Tong Nian in a single word, so that Tong Nian rekindled hope. Han Shangyan went downstairs, and Mi Shaofei deliberately asked Tong Nian to open the door. Tong Nian, who didn't know anything, went downstairs and accidentally saw Han Shangyan. Wang Hao and Xiao Ai also came to Mi Shaofei's house. Wang Hao congratulated Mi Shaofei on his move and said the same blessing as Han Shangyan. Mi Shaofei deliberately asked Tong Nian to help go to the supermarket to buy some heavy objects. Han Shangyan had to accompany Tong Nian to help carry the heavy objects. Tong Nian discovered that Han Shangyan actually cares about her.	0.7	3.06	5	1.08	4.75	1
26	July 23, 2019	When Tong Nian rushed to the hospital, Zheng Hui's mother had a successful operation. Zheng Hui was grateful to Tong Nian and was ready to confess. At this time, Han Shangyan, who had just arrived at the hospital, saw Zheng Hui, a small rival, and proposed to take Tong Nian and Zheng Hui to eat. At the restaurant, Zheng Hui claimed to invite guests. Han Shangyan deliberately ordered a bunch of food. The atmosphere was awkward. Tong Nian had to open Zheng Hui and ask him to go back to the hospital to accompany his mother. Before Zheng Hui left Han Shangyan, he finally said that he would pay the bill. Tong Nian wanted to explain his relationship with Zheng Hui. Han Shangyan took the opportunity to compare himself with Zheng Hui. He talked about his bitter past. Tong Nian disliked Han Shangyan and offered various comforts. Han Shangyan asked Tong Nian about the circle of friends, and Tong Nian argued that it wasn't Ya Ya who sent it himself. Finally, Han Shangyan apologized to Tong Nian for his recent actions, and the two were reconciled.	0.74	3.23	4	1.17	5.09	1
27	July 23, 2019	Xiao Ai's case also allowed Han Shangyan to see Wang Hao's responsibility as a father. He began to examine the events of the year in his heart, and began to try to understand Wang Hao's choices. Wang Hao only made the decision that a father and a man should make. Han Shangyan is at the bottom of his heart and has forgiven Wang Hao and Ai Qing unconsciously. Su Cheng promised Xiao Ai to let her make her own decision. Xiao Ai chose to return to Wang Hao and the two reconciled. Wang Hao was also very happy, and Xiao Ai finally forgave herself. Su Cheng also found Ai Qing and apologized to Ai Qing for the events of the year. The two also reached a settlement. Han Shangyan invited Tong Nian to be a guest at home. Grandpa Han saw Tong Nian and was happy. Tong Nian accidentally discovered that Han Shangyan didn't send away the little milk cat. Finally, Han Shangyan told Tong Nian to send the little milk cat away and go to Norway to make a blind date.	0.74	3.23	4	1.17	5.09	1
28	July 24, 2019	Han Shangyan, Grandpa Han and Tong Nian's family went to visit relatives in their hometown. In Suzhou, relatives gathered together. The relatives grandmother of his hometown saw Han Shangyan for nearly 30 years, and urged Han Shangyan to marry him. In the eyes of the elders, Tong Nian and Han Shangyan had already broken up. Only Tong Nian and Han Shangyan knew they were not separated. Han Shangyan couldn't help but go outside, Tong Nian quietly followed. The two played together in the water town, played chess, sat by the river and watched the scenery, listened to the little boy playing the guitar, and sat on the boat together.	0.79	3.37	5	1.21	5.19	1
29	July 24, 2019	Shao Fei took the initiative to find Han Shangyan and told him that Su Cheng had found him. He figured it out and was willing to join K & K as the team leader. Han Shangyan was very happy, and immediately brought Mi Shaofei to the club to visit, and then the two were drunk in the room. Tong Nian came to the Han Shangyan room in the morning and saw a beer bottle in a place. He thought it was too much pressure from Han Shangyan to borrow wine to relieve his worries. I never thought that it was Mi Shaofei who was lying on the sofa with the quilt covered. Tong Nian ’s confession was rinsed back to the room and Han Shangyan and Mi Shaofei lying on the sofa pretending to be heard clearly. After Mi Shaofei, Tong Nian was ashamed.	0.79	3.37	5	1.21	5.19	1
30	July 25, 2019	Wang Hao and Ai Qing learned that Mi Shaofei had joined K & K and were happy for Mi Shaofei. They were also a bit more worried about whether the SP team could successfully play against K & K. At the same time, Tong Nian released a new song, announcing to the world that he was in love, which attracted strong attention from fans. Han Shangyan saw that he quickly asked Lingshan to register himself on Weibo. The only user he followed was Tong Nian, who left Tong Nian a message, detonated the Internet, and Tong Nian was immersed in happiness.	0.67	2.96	5	1.23	5.42	1
31	July 25, 2019	Han Shangyan sent Tongnian home and stayed at her door all night. He got up early in the morning in Tongnian and was surprised to find that Han Shangyan was still at his doorstep. Han Shangyan asked what is Tong Nian's wish, and Tong Nian's hope will never break up. Han Shangyan mistakenly thought that Tong Nian wanted to get married, so he began to think about their marriage. Tong father went out to practice in the morning. Han Shangyan hid Tong Nian in the car and got off to lead Tong's father. Han Shangyan pretended to be passing by accident and had no feelings about Tong Nian's aftermath. Tong father explained Han Shangyan, and Tong Nian took the opportunity to run home. Tong Nian ran home and was hit by Tong Mother. Tong mother thinks Tong Nian is weird. Tong father asked Tong mother Han Shangyan and Tong Nian why they broke up. Tong mother thought that Han Shangyan was bad. Father Tong said good things for Han Shangyan.	0.67	2.96	5	1.23	5.42	1
32	July 26, 2019	Han Shangyan told Mi Shaofei that he wanted to marry Tong Nian. Lingshan overheard Han Shangyan chatting with Mi Shaofei and told everyone the gossip news that Han Shangyan was getting married. Han Shangyan and Tong Nian returned to the club. Aunt Zhao congratulated him on his new marriage. Han Shangyan was embarrassed and hurriedly pulled Tong Nian away. Tong Nian asked Han Shangyan to argue. They thought of getting married, and it was more real than ever. After the quarrel, the two felt they shouldn't. Han Shangyan returned to the room and found that Tong Nian was asleep. Tong Nian got up and found that Han Shangyan had left. She thought that Han Shangyan was angry and did not return overnight. In fact, Han Shangyan went to the supermarket, bought a bunch of strawberries and snacks, and wanted to coax Tongnian to be happy. Han Shangyan returned to the room and prepared to apologize to Tong Nian. At this time, Tong Nian suddenly embraced Han Shangyan.	0.75	3.43	4	1.24	5.82	1
33	July 26, 2019	Tong Nian answered the phone and confusedly told Tong Mother that she was sleeping at the Han Shang dialect. Mother Tong was angry, and the two were still in contact. After Tong Nian woke up, he learned about his drunk behavior and regretted it. So far, Han Shangyan can only prepare as soon as possible, wear a suit, take Tong Nian home, and officially visit his father and mother. In the face of Tong Nian's parents, Han Shangyan quickly cut the mahjong relationship between the two. He started to paint a story about the two from the acquaintance to the acquaintance, but only reversed the fact that he fell in love at first sight. He told Tong Nian ’s parents that he was obsessed with Tong Nian at first sight and secretly pursued it. Proposed to break up ... he is struggling to recover, and has a deep affection for Tong Nian, not that she does not marry.	0.75	3.43	4	1.24	5.82	1
34	July 27, 2019	The stepmother of Han went to the club to read the Han Shangyan and was proud of the achievements made by Han Shangyan over the years. Han Shangyan called Tong Nian and told him that he and his stepmother would visit Tong Nian's house tonight. Tong Nian was surprised. Queen Mother Han and Han Shangyan had dinner with Tong Nian's parents. Tong Nian was stuck on the road and had no time to attend the gathering of both parents. The queen's mother suggested that Han Shangyan and Tong Nian should get engaged first. Tong Nian ’s parents felt that the progress was too fast, and she said that engagement is not popular now. Han Shangyan suggested that it would be better to get married directly, and the parents were stunned. The queen's mother gave Han Shangyan an eyebrow and blamed him for chaotic rhythm. Tong's mother couldn't help calling Han Shangyan to chat alone. Han Shangyan assured Tong Mu that he would be good to Tong Nian and all respect Tong Nian's wishes. Tong Mu officially recognized Han Shangyan.	0.64	3.19	3	1.19	5.91	1
35	July 28, 2019	In the finals, Han Shangyan took Tong Nian to go to Beijing to watch the game, and assured Tong Nian that he would tell her wherever he went. At the airport, Tong Nian saw her mother-in-law for the first time. The mother-in-law liked Tong Nian very much, and the two of them had a great conversation. On the plane, Han Shangyan greeted Tong Nian, who didn't know how to take care of Tong Nian and kept feeding her snacks.	0.72	3.34	4	1.17	5.26	1
36	July 28, 2019	On the eve of the game, Han Shangyan talked to the players and encouraged them. The former members of the Soro team, Xiaoyou and Yiqian, were invited by Ai Qing to visit Han Shangyan and others. Their old friends met and were very affectionate. Mi Shaofei prepared the players for the station and carefully analyzed everyone in the SP team. After Han Shangyan and his friends gathered back to the room, Tong Nian was asleep, and Han Shangyan took Tong Nian back to the room. The next morning, Tong Nian appeared in front of the crowd wearing K & K uniforms, and everyone was amazed. Han Shangyan and Ai Qing and others met in the gymnasium, recalling that the Soro team won the national championship here and disbanded with emotion.	0.72	3.34	4	1.17	5.26	1
37	July 29, 2019	Han Shangyan took Tong Nian to the square of Beijing Railway Station. Han Shangyan recalled seeing Wang Hao and Ai Qing for the first time here. Han Shangyan told Tong Nian the history of K & K's establishment, and then took out the champion ring to propose to Tong Nian. Tong Nian was completely scared and stupid, suddenly proposed, Tong Nian did not know how to deal with it, and refused stupidly. Han Shangyan withdrew the ring and felt that he was rash. Tong Nian froze and asked when the next proposal would be. Tong Nian was annoyed that he didn't immediately agree.	0.76	3.36	5	1.22	5.42	1
38	July 29, 2019	Han Shangyan sent Tong Nian back home. It happened that the father and mother had not returned home from work. The atmosphere of being alone at home was very shy and restrained. When he just got the courage to talk to the affectionate hug, he was met by Tong's father who came home. The two quickly flashed away. Tong father stayed in Han Shangyan after dinner at home, and his father's attitude towards Han Shangyan improved a lot during the meal. After the meal, Han Shangyan rushed to wash the dishes. Tong father pretended that all these things were done by the mother at home, and was instantly disassembled by the mother. The atmosphere was very happy. When Tong Nian sent Han Shangyan to go out, the two were just about to kiss goodbye. They were seen by the security guard who had just come to patrol. The security guard described Tong Nian's idiot of Han Shangyan who was on his guard every day.	0.76	3.36	5	1.22	5.42	1
39	July 30, 2019	Because of poor training results on Monday, he went to the introspection room alone to reflect. The club can basically determine the lineup of the game based on the team's team performance and server ranking data. Han Shangyan wanted to give the last three a chance to play a one-on-one challenge with the players, in order to convince everyone. The result was eliminated on Monday, Mi Shaofei and Han Shangyan comforted Monday to continue their efforts to fight for the next year. Tong Nian bought a new coffee machine for the club to help the team members make coffee and ease their recent high-intensity training. The team members scrambled for Tong Nian's own coffee and praised Tong Nian. Tong Nian made a heart-shaped coffee for Han Shangyan and sprinkled it with sweet sugar.	0.81	3.55	5	1.37	5.98	1
40	July 30, 2019	In the final of the K & K team and the Australian team VIPO, Tong Nian quietly told Han Shangyan that he wanted to marry Han Shangyan. Tong Nian ’s unsuccessful commitment made Han Shangyan very surprised. He smiled and faced the big screen, telling Tong Nian with a voice that no one could hear, "Take a marriage at the end of the game." No one knows except Tong Nian. What Han Shangyan said, only knew that he was talking to the little girl beside him. At this time, after fierce competition, the victory of the K & K team, thunderous cheers and applause broke out in the audience. Tong Nian wept with joy, the K & K team won the Asia-Pacific championship, and Han Shangyan agreed to take Tong Nian to the World Finals.	0.81	3.55	5	1.37	5.98	1
41	July 31, 2019	Tong's mother hesitated again and again, and finally handed over the account to Han Shangyan. Han Shangyan will take Tong Nian in a taxi, and neighbors will bless the two. Han Shangyan and Tong Nian returned to the club. Wang Hao and others had already been waiting in the room of Han Shangyan and learned that they were going to get married, and everyone wished. Han Shangyan and Tong Nian are going to the Civil Affairs Bureau to register for marriage. In order to be the first to register, the two waited at the door of the Civil Affairs Bureau all morning. Han Shangyan called Grandpa Han and told him that he was going to marry Tong Nian. Grandpa Han fell to the ground and told Han Shangyan to take good care of Tong Nian and hold multiple weddings in Shanghai and Norway for the two. Han Shangyan finally put on Tong Nian's own championship ring and discussed the life after marriage happily.	0.96	3.79	3	1.5	5.94	1

  - Main programs at the same time or cross-slot:
    - CCTV-1 : " Lovely China " / " Amnesty 1959 "
    - CCTV-8 : "The Flower and the Sea " / "The Flowering Season " / " In the Peach Blossoms "
    - Beijing : " Detective Ke Chen " / "All Time Knows "
    - Hunan : "Flowing Good Times" / " Come on, you are the best "
    - Jiangsu : "The Time of Brothers and Sisters " / " Return the World to You "
  - The data is provided by Broad Vision Sofrey, and the survey scope is for audiences over four years old.
  - The above ratings include CCTV . 16 provincial network only lists representative ratings
  - The number of episodes with the lowest ratings is shown in blue, and the number of episodes with the highest ratings is shown in red
