= The Legend of the White Snake (TV series) =

2019 Chinese television drama

- Traditional Chinese: 新白娘子傳奇
- Simplified Chinese: 新白娘子传奇
- Genre: Mythology; Fantasy; Romance
- Written by: An Yimo
- Directed by: Zhi Lei
- Starring: Ju Jingyi; Yu Menglong
- Opening theme: Qian Nian Deng Yi Hui (千年等一回) performed by Ju Jingyi
- Ending theme: Du Qing (渡情) performed by Ju Jingyi
- Country of origin: China
- Original language: Mandarin
- No. of episodes: 36

Production
- Producer: Dai Yu
- Production location: China
- Production companies: iQiyi, Chinese All Digital

Original release
- Network: iQiyi
- Release: April 3, 2019

The Legend of the White Snake (Chinese: 新白娘子传奇) is a 2019 streaming television series starring Ju Jingyi and Yu Menglong. It is based on the Chinese folk legend Legend of the White Snake and a remake of 1992 Taiwanese television series New Legend of Madame White Snake. The series airs on iQiyi starting April 3, 2019.

== Synopsis ==
Based on the folk legend of the same name, the series is set in imperial China during the Southern Song dynasty and focuses on the romance between Xu Xian, a physician based in Lin'an, and Bai Suzhen, a 1000-year-old white snake spirit that has taken the form of a beautiful young woman. Xu and Bai's cross-species love is opposed by Jin Ruyi, the young daughter of Xu's master, who is infatuated with Xu. Ruyi's obsession with Xu creates a grudge between her and Bai. Xu and Bai's relationship was also initially opposed by Fahai, an orthodox Buddhist monk who harbored a bias against demons and animal spirits. Throughout the series, Bai is accompanied by Xiao Qing, a 500-year-old green snake spirit who is later revealed to be a demigod. Qing shares a sisterly bond with Bai because of their similarities and remains loyal to her.

== Cast ==
=== Main ===
- Ju Jingyi, as Bai Suzhen, is a 1000-year-old white snake spirit who was cultivated alongside Jingsong on Mount Emei before moving to Lin'an. Bai is noted for her beauty, intelligence, and righteous nature. She falls in love with Xu Xian and opens the Baohe Clinic with him. She is close friends with Jingsong and Xiao Qing.
- Yu Menglong as Xu Xian, a kind-hearted and intelligent physician who comes from a wealthy family. Due to his parents' untimely deaths, Xu was raised by his older sister, Xu Jiaorong, and previously worked for Jinshi Clinic before opening Baohe Clinic with his wife, Suzhen.
- Xiao Yan as Xiao Qing, a 500-year-old romping and cross-dressing green snake spirit who is the daughter of the snake spirit Yu Furong and the Dragon King Ao Guang, making her a demigod, and Qing bears a striking resemblance to her mother when she was much younger. Her mother was killed because of her relationship with Ao Guang, as Heaven did not permit love between demons and gods. However, her father was not because Jade Lotus refused to reveal his identity. Qing learned of her demigod status late in the series and eventually reconciled with her father.
- Pei Zitian as Fahai, a Buddhist monk from Jinshan Temple. His obsession with eliminating demons resulted in him strengthening the Mind Demon. After reaching enlightenment, Fahai helps Hanwen save Suzhen from her death.
- Yu Lang as Jin Ruyi, owner of Jinshi Clinic, who is in love with Xu, whom she refers to as Hanwen. Wang Daoling, a frog spirit, claims her to be the reincarnation of his previous love. Ruyi's hatred and jealousy towards Suzhen allow the Mind Demon to reside in her. Realizing the sins that the Mind Demon tricked her into committing, Ruyi kills herself in a futile attempt to kill the Mind Demon.

=== Supporting cast ===
- Nie Zihao as Jingsong, a golden mouse spirit who is a close friend of Suzhen. His jealousy towards Xu drove a wedge between him and Suzhen, though they later reconcile when Jingsong helps Suzhen save Xu. While helping Suzhen, Jingsong used magic that quickly depleted all his years of cultivation. Suzhen believed Jingsong's soul had been scattered as a result, although it was later revealed that his good deed pleased Heaven and allowed him to be reborn, albeit in the form of a golden squirrel.
- Feng Jianyu as Zhang Yutang, an herb collector who worked for Baohe Clinic. He falls in love with Qing, who helps him learn of his identity as a nobleman who was kidnapped as a child.
- Li Lin as Li Gongfu. Brother-in-law of Xu and husband of Xu Jiaorong. Li came from a poor family, but was the only suitor of Jiaorong who agreed to allow Xu Xian to live with them after marriage. Li works as a county official for Lin’an.
- Zeng Yunzhen as Xu Jiaorong. Jiaorong raised her brother Xu Xian from a young age. She is skilled in housework and wants the best for her younger brother.
- Cecilia Yip as Xu Xian's mother
- Maggie Chen as Yu Furong, Qing’s mother. Yu’s relationship with the Dragon King Ao Guang results in her death. She refuses to reveal Ao as the one whom she had an affair with, thus sparing him.
- Tse Kwan-ho as Xu Huairen
- Wang Weiyuan as Wao Daoling. A frog spirit who is in love with Jin Ruyi. He goes to great lengths to please her, though he eventually dies at her hands.
- Huang Kaijie as Xu Shilin
- Zhao Yingzi as Li Bilian
- Choenyi Tsering as Lady Wu
- Yi Yizi as Hu Kexin, a fox spirit that steals the hearts of men. She collaborates with Jingsong, who wants to kill Xu Xian. Hu is killed by Fahai.
- Tang Zhenye as Prime Minister Liang
- David Wu as Lü Dongbin
- Sunny Tu as Guanyin
- Wang Weiguo as Jade Emperor
- Zhu Longguang as Buddha
- Heidi Wang as Queen Mother
- Chen Chongyuan as Wu Guibao
- Liao Pengfei as Ah Luo
- Fan Wendong as Xie Daqian
- Wang Ronghong as He Dagu
- Shen Baoping as Clan Master Lingyou
- Hou Changrong as Dragon King Ao Guang. Ao was deeply in love with Yu Furong despite Heaven’s Law forbidding them from being together. After Yu’s death, Ao refuses to acknowledge Qing as his daughter and sends the Four Immortals to guard over Qing at the West Lake. At the end of the series, Ao sincerely apologizes to his daughter for his cowardice and invites her to stay with him at the Crystal Palace.
- Jackson Lou as Pagoda-Bearing Heavenly King Li
- Fang Yilun as Prince Mu, close friend of Xu Xian.
- Yao Tongtong as Princess Consort Mu
- Ma Shuliang as Mr. Jin
- Liu Lifei as Yinxiang
- Zhang Bowen as Changsheng

== Production ==
The series was filmed from March to July 2018.

The series is primarily based on the 1992 television series adaptation of the folk tale legend.

== Soundtrack ==
- Qian Nian Deng Yi Hui (千年等一回; A Millennium's Wait for a Return) performed by Ju Jingyi
- Du Qing (渡情; Passing Feelings) performed by Ju Jingyi
- Qing Cheng Shan Xia Bai Suzhen (青城山下白素贞; Bai Suzhen under Mount Qingcheng) performed by Ju Jingyi

== Awards and nominations ==
Award	Category	Nominee	Results	Ref.
Golden Bud – The Fourth Network Film And Television Festival	Best Web Series	The Legend of the White Snake	Nominated	
Golden Bud – The Fourth Network Film And Television Festival	Best Actor	Yu Menglong	Nominated	
Golden Bud – The Fourth Network Film And Television Festival	Best Actress	Ju Jingyi	Nominated	
Golden Bud – The Fourth Network Film And Television Festival	Best Newcomer	Xiao Yan	Nominated	

== International broadcast ==
Country	Network(s)/Station(s)	Series premiere	Title
China; Taiwan	iQiyi	April 3, 2019 (Broadcasting six episodes from Wednesday to Friday)	新白娘子传奇
Malaysia	Astro Quan Jia HD	April 15, 2019 (Monday to Friday 19:00 – 20:00)	The Legend of the White Snake
China	Shenzhen TV (深圳卫视)	June 27, 2019 (19:30–21:15 every night (two episodes))	新白娘子传奇
Thailand	Mono 29	Nov, 2019 (Every Monday to Friday at : 07.35 AM)	ตำนานรักนางพญางูขาว (lit. 'Love Legend of Madam White Snake')
Indonesia	Trans7	October 11, 2021 (Every Monday to Friday at 09.00 AM)	Legenda Siluman Ular Putih
