= The Dreaming Man =

2017 film by Wang Ying

- Directed by: Wang Ying
- Screenplay by: Wang Ying
- Produced by: Elaine Chin; Elona Tsou; Robert Wei
- Starring: Chen Bolin; Lin Yun; Zhang Yunlong
- Production companies: SMG Pictures; Walt Disney Pictures China; Shanghai Artrendwave Productions
- Distributed by: China Film Group
- Release date: 8 December 2017
- Running time: 101 minutes
- Country: China
- Language: Mandarin

The Dreaming Man (Chinese: 假如王子睡着了) is a 2017 Chinese romantic comedy film starring Chen Bolin, Lin Yun and Zhang Yunlong. It is a remake of While You Were Sleeping.

It is the second Chinese film produced by The Walt Disney Studios, after The Secret of the Magic Gourd. The film was released on 8 December 2017.

== Synopsis ==
Wang Xiaohe (portrayed by Lin Yun)'s parents died early, leaving her to live alone in a big city. She fell in love with the talented Zheng Tianle (portrayed by Zhang Yunlong) and was mistaken as his fiancee by his older brother Zheng Tianchou (portrayed by Chen Bolin) because of a diamond ring. How will the three of them resolve these conflicts?

== Cast ==
- Chen Bolin as Zheng Tianchou
- Lin Yun as Wang Xiaohe
- Zhang Yunlong as Zheng Tianle
- Phil Chang as Uncle
- Paul Chun as Father
- Jiang Hongbo as Mother
- Chung Hsin-ling as Aunt
- Chen Qi as Grandmother
- Chen Si

== Production ==
The Dreaming Man is the first live-action theatrical release that is part of the multi-picture development deal between Wudi Pictures Corp and the Walt Disney Studios. The film is co-produced by Shanghai Media Group, Walt Disney Studios and Shanghai Artrendwave Productions.

== Soundtrack ==
No.	Title	Performer	Length
1.	"Message In A Bottle (小瓶子)"	JJ Lin	04:12
