= Huang Mengying =

Chinese actress (born 1990)

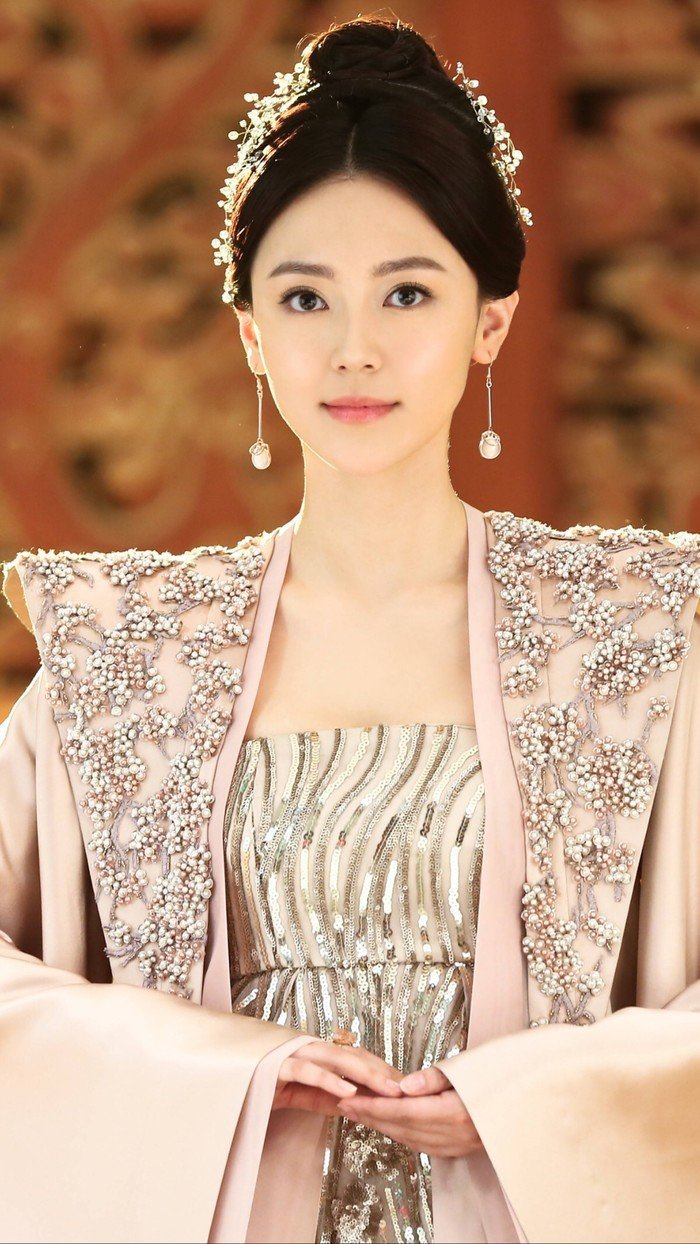
- Huang in 2022
- Born: December 6, 1990 (age 35); Chengdu, Sichuan, China
- Other name: Maggie Huang
- Education: Beijing Film Academy
- Occupation: Actress
- Years active: 2012–present
- Agent: Jay Walk Studio

Chinese name
- Traditional Chinese: 黃夢瑩
- Simplified Chinese: 黄梦莹
Transcriptions
Standard Mandarin
- Hanyu Pinyin: Huáng Mèngyíng

Huang Mengying (Chinese: 黄梦莹; born 6 December 1990), also known as Maggie Huang, is a Chinese actress who graduated from the Beijing Film Academy. She rose to fame for her role as Sujin in Eternal Love (2017), and gained increased recognition for her supporting roles in Princess Agents and Lost Love in Times.

== Filmography ==
=== Television series ===
Year	English title	Chinese title	Role	Notes
2013	A Clear Midsummer Night	盛夏晚晴天	Jingyuan	
2014	Wine Beauty	红酒俏佳人	Tan Yi'na	
2014	Love is Back	爱情回来了	Miss Ni	
2015		娘家的故事4	Su Jing'er	
2016	Golden Bloody Path	黄金血道	Liu Jiaojiao	
2016	Police Beauty & K9	警花与警犬	Nina	
2016	The Legend of Du Xinwu	杜心五传奇	An Yulan	
2017	The Song	恋恋阕歌	Yi Lian	
2017	Eternal Love	三生三世十里桃花	Sujin	
2017	Night Market Life	夜市人生	Ou Xiaomin	
2017	Royal Sister Returns	御姐归来	Xia Qingqing	
2017	Princess Agents	楚乔传	Xiao Yu	
2017	Lost Love in Times	醉玲珑	Duoxia	
2019	Unbeatable You	逆流而上的你	Gao Mi	
2019	In Youth	趁我们还年轻	Ji Xuanli	
2019	L.O.R.D. Critical World	爵迹·临界天下	Shen Yin	
2019	No Secrets	没有秘密的你	Gu Siyu	
2020	Reunion: The Sound of the Providence	重启之极海听雷	Ya Nv (Chu Chu)	
2022	Lady Zhong Wuyan	齐丑无艳之破镜重圆	Zhong Wuyan	
2023	Side Story Of Fox Volant	飛狐外傳		
TBA	Overseas Security Officer	莫语者	Hai Lun	
TBA	Babel	通天塔	Jiang Yiran	

== Awards and nominations ==
Year	Awards	Category	Nominated work	Results	Ref.
2017	6th iQiyi All-Star Carnival	Best Character Portrayal	—N/a	Won	
2018	10th China TV Drama Awards	Media Recommended Actor	—N/a	Won	
2019	Golden Bud - The Fourth Network Film And Television Festival	Best Actress	Unbeatable You, In Youth, No Secrets	Nominated	
2020	7th The Actors of China Award Ceremony	Best Actress (Web series)	—N/a	Nominated	
