= List of Go Go Squid! characters =

This is a list of characters from the 2019 Chinese television series Go Go Squid!.

== Main cast ==
=== Tong Nian ===
Portrayed by Yang Zi a talented computer major who is also a popular online singer. She is optimistic, cheerful, soft, and cute. She is very obedient, attentive, and very sensible. She is attending the youth class at the university and has the same high IQ as the male lead Han Shangyan. After she fell in love with Han Shangyan at first sight, she chose to take the initiative to approach each other and bravely pursue love, but she did not do so blindly. Although Tong Nian loved Han Shangyan very much, she couldn't extricate herself without falling in love and have her own dreams and pursuits.

=== Han Shangyan/Gun ===
Portrayed by Li Xian a computer genius, a high-cold e-sports idol. Han is a legend in the e-sports world. He has climbed to the top, has fallen through the trough, and has experienced strong winds and waves. He was originally the only investor and main member of the Solo team. Has won more than ten international championships, including multiple personal world rankings, the most dominant player with two MVP. After exiting the team, he established the K & K club. His dream is to take the club's young players to attack the world champion of cybersecurity CTF competitions. Other than that, he has nothing else in his eyes. In the eyes of his teammates, he is "the boss who is not close to women".

Han Shangyan is persistent in his ambitions and unwavering to his convictions, yet he keeps the world at arm's length, guarded toward both warmth and coldness from others. This guarded detachment stems directly from his early family life. His mother died during childbirth, and his father passed away as few years after remarrying, leaving him in the care of his stepmother and grandfather. Although his home environment provided genuine support, his relationship with his grandfather remained strained by frequent misunderstandings. Growing up without the steady guidance of both parents, he learned to rely entirely on himself and adopted and emotinally distant exterior. While he projects indifference toward romance and daily matters outside his work, he quietly attends to the personal well-being of his team members, revealing a protective mature beneath his cold facade. His outward difference toward anything other than work stands in stark contrast to his fanatical pursuit of career ideals; privately, he looks after his players' daily lives and personal needs. While he attracts considerable romantic attention, he maintains no interest in dating.

== Supporting cast ==
- Wu Bai/DT, portrayed by Hu Yitian, is Han's cousin. He is the current top CTF player known as DT and part of the K&K team. Wu Bai is a very quiet guy who likes to be alone but highly dependable. He has a liking for Ai Qing since high school. He is the number one strong player in China, and also an excellent computer genius. It has always been his dream and perseverance to win the championship with teammates and fight for and maintain team honor.
- Mi Shaofei/Xiao Mi, portrayed by Lee Hong-chi, a retired CTF player who wants to make a comeback to gaming. He also used to be part of Team Solo and has a close relationship with Han as well as Solo. Later, he was invited by Solo to come back under SP, but he announced his retirement because of his unsatisfactory results. He was later convinced by Su Cheng to join Team K&K as a team manager.
- Ai Qing / Appledog, portrayed by Wang Zhen'er is the team manager for Team SP. She is regarded as the "goddess" of the gaming scene. Wang Hao's ex-girlfriend
- Wang Hao/Solo, portrayed by Li Zefeng, is the representative of the China branch of SP Gaming. He is heavily involved in SP's CTF team. Solo used to be the captain of Team Solo which had achieved good results nationally. He is a single father to a 10-year-old daughter, Xiao Ai.
- Sun Ya Ya, portrayed by Jiang Peiyao, is Tong Nian's good friend as well as dormitory mate. She is also a CTF fan and loves Team Solo, especially Shao Fei.
- Su Cheng is K&K's team manager in China. Her husband is Nan Wei who helped Han to establish K&K Club and handles its operations in its Norway headquarters. Su Cheng and Solo used to be lovers and Xiao Ai is her daughter.
- Ou Qiang/All, portrayed by Chen Xijun is the only one of the 5 partners in Team Solo who is still competing under the username All. He is part of Team SP and has a cheerful personality.
- Grandpa Han, portrayed by Paul Chun, is Han and Wu Bai's grandfather. He often quarrels with Han but cares a lot about him. He likes to play matchmaker to his grandson because he wants to see him settle down happily.
- Grunt / Shen Zhe, portrayed by Wen Yifan, Vice-Captain of Team K&K. He has a poisonous mouth but a soft heart.
- 97 / Ling Shan, portrayed by Li Mingde, main defender of Team K&K. A bright and talkative guy who loves to tease Demo.
- One / Zhou Yi, portrayed by Xu Yuexiao, Sub-defender of Team K&K. The tallest in the team.
- Demo / Dai Feng, portrayed by Yu Chengen, Sub-attacker of Team K&K. The youngest in the team, he has a cute and blur personality.
- Tong Nian's mother, portrayed by Sun Lin.
- Tong Nian's father, portrayed by Wang Ce.
- Xiao Ai portrayed by Zhang Ge, is Solo's daughter. She has a hearing problem and uses a hearing aid. While Solo dotes on her, Xiao Ai is undergoing a rebellious streak as she grows up. She is cocky and hates her mother.
- Lan Mei, portrayed by Shi Qingyan, Tong Nian's close friend. A popular online singer (NetEaseCloudMusic).

== Special appearance ==
- Han Jia Jia, portrayed by Liang Aiqi, Han Shangyan's step-mother. She treats Han Shangyan as her own.
- Zhou Xiaohai, portrayed by Zhou Xiaohei, Tong Nian's professor and Han Shangyan's friend.
