= Xuan-Yuan Sword: Han Cloud =

- Also known as: 軒轅劍之漢之雲
- Genre: Xianxia; Fantasy; Action; Adventure; Romance
- Starring: Zhang Yunlong; Yu Menglong; Guan Xiaotong; Zhang Jianing; Ju Jingyi; Vengo Gao
- Country of origin: China
- Original language: Mandarin
- No. of episodes: 58

Production
- Production location: China
- Production companies: Shanghai New Culture Media Group Co., Ltd; Softstar Entertainment Inc; Leyoung Entertainment

Original release
- Release: August 8 – December 7, 2017

Xuan-Yuan Sword: Han Cloud (Chinese: 軒轅劍之漢之雲) is a 2017 Chinese television series adapted from Xuan-Yuan Sword, a series of role-playing video games developed by Taiwanese company Softstar Entertainment Inc. It stars Zhang Yunlong, Yu Menglong, Guan Xiaotong, Zhang Jianing, Ju Jingyi and Vengo Gao. The series is airing two episodes back-to-back on Dragon TV every Mondays and Tuesdays at 22:00 (CST) starting from 8 August 2017 for 58 episodes.

== Synopsis ==
After the ancient Emperor defeated the demons, the shattered sword was broken into two parts. Two sword spirits were born – Zhaoyun and Muyun. However, due to the chaos caused by the battles, the two brothers were separated due to attack of xiao yue army. Zhaoyun was raised by a group of warriors called Flying Feathers (Fei Yu), in charge of aiding Gongyang Shuo’s quest to expand the kingdom of Yao Han; while Muyun was under the Bronze Bird army (Tongque Zunzhe) of Xiao Yue. The two brothers were reunited in a battle between their kingdoms. When Zhaoyun discovers the truth, he uses their bloodline to save Muyun from danger.

The kind-hearted Zhaoyun was heartbroken to see the people suffering due to war. With the help of Yeyaxi, a princess from a tribe, the two brothers worked together and overcame dangerous and difficult situations. In the end, they found the Emperor sword which symbolizes justice, using it to defeat the cruel and barbaric Chun Yuyue, therefore destroying the Bronze Bird army and bringing peace back to the world.

== Cast ==
=== Main ===
- Zhang Yunlong as Huangfu Zhaoyun / Yanfeng

One of the two sword spirits; overall leader of the Flying Feathers and head of the Feathers (Yu) faction. He wields Fang Tian Hua Ji, a weapon bearing the mark of a panther with a majestic grandeur that befits its owner.
A man who values camaraderie and justice, and fights for the people. He was separated from his mother and brother when he was young and ended up joining the army. Yeyaxi is his one true love and Hengai is his confidante.

- Yu Menglong as Xu Muyun / the White-clothed reverent (Bai Yi)

One of the two sword spirits; leader of the Bronze Bird. He wields Feng Ri Ming Quan, a sword that can level ten thousand miles.
After losing contact with his family, Muyun becomes the disciple of Zhang Han, a Xiao Yue general. He is cold, yet persistent and sincere toward the ones he loved. He is Shang Rui's god-brother and considers him as his only friend. Lanyin is his one true love.

- Guan Xiaotong as Yeyaxi

A young woman from Yinzhou. She wields the Yan Shui Ling Yu, which is said that a slight wave can cause a disturbance in heaven and earth.
After her tribe is obliterated and her younger brother is forced into slavery, she is put on a pedestal as the princess of Cang Wu kingdom due to her special abilities. She yearns for world peace but has no choice but to face battles.

- Zhang Jianing as Heng Ai / Sheng'er

One of the four immortals evolved from a musical instrument (Sheng). She is the owner of Lian Yao Hu, one of the ten great heavenly weapons and a mythical object with the capacity to swallow heaven and earth.
Hundreds of years ago, she was tasked to go to the human realm in search for the Xuan Yuan Sword but an incident causes her and Qing'er to separate from each other. Later on, she joins the Winged Tribe as one of the ten flying feathers, where she meets and fell in love with Zhaoyun. She is cold, distant and mysterious due to her identity.

- Ju Jingyi as Lan Yin

Daughter of Shan Hai World's Ying Long. A gentle mute who serves as one of the handmaidens in Zhang Han's manor. She is Muyun's childhood friend and lover, who died while trying to stop Muyun's sword aura from consuming him. An incident causes her spirit to be trapped within Yeyaxi's Yan Shui Ling Yu.

- Vengo Gao as Shang Rui / the Purple-clothed reverent.

The creator of the Bronze Bird Army, and brother of the Xiao Yue Emperor. He is cold, arrogant and has a talent for manipulation which he uses to further his ambitions; yet possesses a devilish charm that one can't help but to love. He only has eyes for Qing'er who is his one true love. He also cares deeply for Muyun, whom he considers as his god-brother. He was later revealed to be a powerful demon lord that fought against the ancient Emperor who took over the body of Shang Rui years before the start of the story. His goal is to obtain Xuan-Yuan Sword and take over the three realms of earth by using Qing'er, Xu Muyun, and Yanfeng by manipulating them to fulfill his plans.

=== Supporting ===
==== Flying Feathers ====
- Dai Si as Duanmeng

Head of the Flying (Fei) faction, who wields double swords and is skilled in assassination. She was abandoned as a child due to her father's defeat in war, and later adopted by a Yao Han general. Due to her lonely past, she becomes cold and withdrawn. After her adoptive father was accused of treachery, she decided to join the Flying Feathers in order to seek the truth.
She has a one-sided love for Yanfeng

- Li Zonglin as Shangzhang

Duanmeng's younger brother, an innocent and naive man who is very reliant on his sister. He is skilled in constructing magical barriers and the art of invisibility.

- Yan Xi as Tuwei

A mysterious and quiet young man who evolved from a scarecrow and specializes in healing skills. He secretly loves Hengai, who has taken care of him in his original form.

- Gao Taiyu as Youzhao

An arrogant young man with a high sense of proprietary. He is skilled in gunmanship. His only ambition is to avenge his kingdom and eliminate the enemies.

- Wu Xudong as Qiangwu

A loyal man who does not seek fame or power. He is skilled in archery. He is also Yanfeng's best friend.

- Zhu Jiaqi as Zhaoyang

A dependable and warm-hearted swordsman who likes Duanmeng.

- Xu Yang as Zhuli

An intelligent and knowledgeable young man who specializes in the art of traps.

- Zhao Zhenting as Shangheng

A man who is skilled in magical spells and battle alignment.

==== Bronze Bird Army ====
- Wang Ruizi as Qing'er / the Red-clothed reverent

Heng Ai's sister, an immortal who evolved from a musical instrument (Qing). She comes to the mortal realm with her sister to complete their respective mission, and unexpectedly falls in love at first sight with Shang Rui. Her love for Shang Rui made her abandon her duty and status as an immortal. Unknown to her that Shang Rui did not truly love her and only need her to restore the Xuan-Yuan Sword

- Zhang Junming as Guan Shi / the Yellow-clothed reverent

A crafty and ambitious young man who seeks fame and power. He specializes in the art of disillusionment and reading minds.

- Shan Sihan as Jiuyou / the Green-clothed reverent

A brash and strong man who is skilled in swordsmanship and magical skills.

- Tang Guozhong as Han Long / the Black-clothed reverent

A bandit who possesses immense strength and lethal attacks, and is skilled in horsemanship.

==== Others ====
- Winston Chao as Gongyang Shuo

Prime minister of Yao Han kingdom; an intelligent military strategist.

- Lu Xingyu as Duowenshi

Advisor of the Flying Feathers. He is loyal to his country, but can be inflexible and stubborn.

- Fu Chengpeng as Yuwen Yi

Prime minister of Xiao Yue kingdom.

- Joe Ma as Zhang Han

Great general of Xiao Yue kingdom; Muyun's teacher. He died in battle against the Flying Feathers in war.

- Kathy Chow as Gu Yuxiang

Elder princess of Cangwu kingdom; Yeyaxi's foster mother.

- Fu Tianjiao as Gu Ting

Great general of Cangwu kingdom.

- Bobo Gan as Qin'er / Wushan Immortal

One of the four immortals who evolved from a musical instrument (Qin). She breached a heavenly rule and was sent to guard the Wushan Town as a punishment.

- Gao Yang as Di'er / Luoshui Immortal

One of the four immortals who evolved from a musical instrument (Dizi).

- He Zhonghua as Xu Zhi

Muyun's foster father.

- Shi Yue An Xi as Duopeng

A parrot who lived in Hengai's Lian Yao Hu. He is said to be very knowledgeable.

- Yang Liu as Rain Girl

One of the demons who lived in Hengai's Lian Yao Hu.

- Liu Zhoucheng as Ma Qi

== Soundtrack ==
Xuan-Yuan Sword: Han Cloud – Original Television Soundtrack (轩辕剑之汉之云电视剧原声音乐大碟)
No.	Title	Music	Length
1.	"Han Cloud (汉之云)" (Opening theme song)	Leon Zhang
2.	"Battle Cloud (战云)" (Opening theme song)	Ji Banai
3.	"Bright Moon (明月)" (Ending theme song)	Guan Xiaotong
4.	"Half (一半)" (Ending theme song)	Yu Menglong
5.	"Silent Soul Separation (黯然销魂)"	Xuan Shang

== Ratings ==
Premiere Dragon TV CSM52 City ratings
Broadcast date	Ratings (%)	Audience share (%)
2017.8.8	0.64	3.82
2017.8.14	0.626	3.66
2017.8.15	0.743	4.333
2017.8.21	0.577	3.812
2017.8.22	0.419	2.632
2017.8.28	0.542	3.267
2017.8.29	0.542	3.267
2017.9.4	0.676	4.696
2017.9.11	0.707	5.045
2017.9.18	0.535	3.663
2017.9.25	0.581	3.878
2017.10.11	0.166	1.663
2017.10.12	0.391	3.730
2017.11.1	0.408	2.916
2017.11.2	0.356	2.520
2017.11.8	0.373	2.601
2017.11.9	0.331	2.464
2017.11.15	0.345	2.400
2017.11.16	0.247	1.711
2017.11.22	0.369	2.625
2017.11.23	0.317	2.195
2017.11.29	0.285	1967
2017.11.30	0.288	1.930
2017.12.6	0.374	2.588
2017.12.7	0.480	3.257
2017.12.13	0.400	3.013
2017.12.14	0.455	3.175

== International broadcast ==
Country	Network	Airing dates
China	Dragon Television	August 8, 2017 – December 14, 2017 (Every Tuesday Tuesday from 21:55 – 23:25)
China	iQiyi	August 9, 2017 – (Updated every Tuesday at 22:00)
Thailand	Channel 9 MCOT HD	June 16, 2018 – October 7, 2018 (Every Saturday and Sunday from 14.05 – 15.30.)
