= In Youth =

2019 Chinese TV series

- Genre: Workplace; Romance
- Written by: Wang Yun; Yang Qing; Zhang Xiaoming; Jin Hongda; Zhao Meng
- Directed by: Wang Ying
- Starring: Zhang Yunlong; Qiao Xin; Liu Ruilin; Huang Mengying; Dai Si
- Country of origin: China
- Original language: Mandarin
- No. of episodes: 38

Production
- Producer: Gao Chen
- Production location: Beijing
- Running time: 45 mins
- Production companies: Jay Walk Studio; Perfect World Pictures

Original release
- Network: Dragon TV
- Release: April 13 – May 3, 2019

In Youth (Chinese: 趁我们还年轻; pinyin: Chen Wo Men Hai Nian Qing) is a 2019 Chinese television series starring Zhang Yunlong, Qiao Xin, Liu Ruilin, Huang Mengying and Dai Si. Set in the 21st century, this series follows a group of university friends and their early struggles in the workplace. The drama was filmed in Beijing from August 2017 to December 2017. It aired on Dragon TV from April 13 to May 3, 2019.

== Synopsis ==
After graduation, Lin Ziyu was fortunate enough to get a position at Feilin, an accomplished PR firm with a good reputation. Unfortunately, she immediately gets on the wrong side of her boss Fan Shuchen. At the same time, the company faces corporate leakages such that Fan Shuchen suspects that Lin Ziyu may be the culprit. The two resolves misunderstandings and work together to find the real culprit. Along the way, they start falling for each other.

== Cast ==
- Zhang Yunlong as Fan Shuchen
- Qiao Xin as Lin Ziyu
- Liu Ruilin as Shi Weicong
- Huang Mengying as Ji Xuanli
- Dai Si as Li Yangyang
- Yao Yichen as Luo Zongliang
- Denny Huang as Ge Yihan
- Wang Xiao as Yu Dong
- Yi Daqian as Hong Xiaoliang

== Soundtrack ==
No.	Title	Lyrics	Music	Singers	Length
1.	"In Youth (趁年轻)" (Opening theme song)	Chen Xi	Dong Dongdong	Zhang Yunlong
2.	"Never Lose (永不言败)" (Ending theme song)	Chen Xi	Dong Dongdong	Han Mubo, Qin Fen, Qin Qimo,, Dai Peiyao, Zuo Ye
3.	"In Love (趁相爱)"	Chen Xi	Dong Dongdong	Liu Xijun, Wu Jiacheng
4.	"Everything I Have Is Related To You (我的一切都和你有關係)"	Chen Xi	Dong Dongdong	Silence Wang
5.	"Together (一起)"	Chen Xi	Dong Dongdong	He Jie

== Ratings ==
Dragon TV CSM55 City ratings
Broadcast date	Ratings (%)	Audience share (%)	Rank
2019.4.13	0.739	2.79	4
2019.4.14	0.857	3.12	4
2019.4.15	0.863	3.22	4
2019.4.16	1.023	3.94	4
2019.4.17	0.918	3.55	4
2019.4.18	0.904	3.44	4
2019.4.19	0.783	2.89	4
2019.4.20	0.782	3	2
2019.4.21	0.821	3.04	2
2019.4.22	0.842	3.24	2
2019.4.23	0.868	3.32	2
2019.4.24	0.96	3.64	1
2019.4.25	0.813	3.12	5
2019.4.26	0.896	3.31	4
2019.4.27	0.903	3.21	4
2019.4.28	0.86	3.1	4
2019.4.29	0.974	3.62	3
2019.4.30	0.981	3.69	4
2019.5.1	0.865	3.42	3
2019.5.2	1.081	4.35	1
2019.5.3	1.02	3.79	2

== Awards and nominations ==
Award	Category	Nominated work	Result	Ref.
Golden Bud - The Fourth Network Film And Television Festival	Best Actress	Qiao Xin	Nominated	
Golden Bud - The Fourth Network Film And Television Festival	Best Actress	Huang Mengying	Nominated	
