= The Legends (TV series) =

2019 Chinese TV series

- Also known as: Zhaoyao
- Chinese: 招摇
- Genre: Xianxia; Romance
- Based on: Zhaoyao by Jiuliu Feixiang
- Written by: Jiuliu Feixiang; Yang Qianzi; Peng Yunrui
- Directed by: Zheng Weiwen
- Starring: Bai Lu; Xu Kai; Dai Xu; Xiao Yan
- Country of origin: China
- Original language: Mandarin
- No. of episodes: 56

Production
- Executive producers: Yuan Jie; Liu Lu; Huang Yanhong
- Production company: Yu Heng Film Group

Original release
- Network: Hunan TV
- Release: January 28 – April 3, 2019

Zhaoyao (Chinese: 招摇), also known as The Legends, is a 2019 Chinese television series starring Bai Lu, Xu Kai, Dai Xu and Xiao Yan. It is based on the web novel of the same name by Jiuliu Feixiang. It aired on Hunan TV from January 28 to April 3, 2019.

== Synopsis ==
Lu Zhaoyao (Bai Lu) and her grandfather are bound by duty to guard the seal that has kept the Demon King's son in chains. When an intruder barges in, the Demon King's son escapes and falls into the hands of the righteous sect. Zhao Yao saves him (Xu Kai) and gives him the name Mo Qing. In trying to obtain the Wan Jun Sword, Zhao Yao mistakenly thinks that Mo Qing has betrayed her.

Five years later, Lu Zhaoyao manages to establish a connection with Qin Zhiyan (Xiao Yan) of the Immortal Sect. She returns to Wan Lu Sect, hoping to reclaim her position. She discovers that Mo Qing, the Demon King's son, has reclaimed his name as Li Chenlan and currently sits in the center of power. Lu Zhaoyao uses her attraction towards him and colludes with Jiang Wu (Dai Xu) with a scheme of her own. Secrets from the past are revealed. Lu Zhaoyao realizes who her friends and enemies are all along.

== Cast ==
- Bai Lu as Lu Zhaoyao
- Xu Kai as Li Chenlan / Mo Qing
- Dai Xu as Jiang Wu
- Xiao Yan as Qin Zhiyan
- Liu Guanxiang as Luo Mingxuan
- Mi Lu as Liu Suruo
- Li Zifeng as Qin Qianxuan
- Xiang Hao as Gu Hanguang
- Yang Ze as Liu Cangling
- Ding Ye as Sima Rong
- Zhang Xin as Lu Shiqi
- Wang Deshun as Zi Dan

== Production ==
=== Filming ===
Shooting began on October 27, 2017 at Hongshilinzhen in Hunan and wrapped up on February 12, 2018. Filming also took place in Hengdian World Studios.

=== Crew ===
Zheng Wei, the main director of the drama, previously directed The Imperial Doctress and Secret of the Three Kingdoms. The production team also hired screenwriter Shunjian Qingcheng (The Rise of Phoenixes) as the literary consult of the drama; and Yuan Jie as the main executive producer. Jiuliu Feixiang, the author of the original novel, co-wrote the script with Yang Ziqian (Prince of Lan Ling).

== Soundtrack ==
- Zhaoyao (招摇; Ostentatious) performed by Chen Chusheng & Hu Shasha
- Lu Zhiyao (路之遥; A Far Journey) performed by Ding Ding
- Ye Weiyang (未央夜; Night Hasn't Ended) performed by Yuan Ye
- Su Ming (宿命; Fate) performed by Deng Gu
- Yi Qi (一起; Together) performed by Ding Ding

== Reception ==
The drama received positive reviews from the audience for its unique characters and comedic elements, as well as its interesting romance storyline. It was also praised for its showcase and emphasis on strong female characters, as well as its positive and inspirational storyline. It topped television ratings in its time slot during its entire run.

== Awards and nominations ==
Award	Category	Nominee	Results	Ref.
Golden Bud - The Fourth Network Film And Television Festival	Best Actor	Xu Kai	Nominated	
Golden Bud - The Fourth Network Film And Television Festival	Best Actress	Bai Lu	Nominated	
Golden Bud - The Fourth Network Film And Television Festival	Best Newcomer	Xiao Yan	Nominated	
Baidu Fudian Awards	Top Ten Television Series		Won	
