= Lin Yun =

Chinese actress and model (born 1996)

- Lin in Footprints of Change (2025)
- Born: Fei Xia (费霞); April 16, 1996 (age 30); Huzhou, Zhejiang, China
- Education: Huzhou No. 12 Middle School
- Alma mater: Beijing College, Shandong Heze Academy of Music and Art
- Occupations: Actress, model
- Years active: 2014–present
- Parent: Fei Jianhua (father)

Lin Yun (Chinese: 林允; pinyin: Lín Yǔn, born April 16, 1996), also known by her English name Jelly Lin, is a Chinese actress and model. She is best known for her role as the female lead in the 2016 film The Mermaid.

== Biography ==
Lin was born Fei Xia (费霞) in Huzhou, Zhejiang, on April 16, 1996. Her father, Fei Jianhua (费建华), is a porter, and her mother is a housewife. She studied at the Huzhou No. 12 Middle School, and then attended a performing arts school in Beijing.

== Career ==
At the age of 18 and with little acting experience, Lin was cast as the female protagonist in the 2016 film The Mermaid directed by Stephen Chow. The Mermaid was the highest-grossing film in China and launched Lin to fame. The same year, Lin featured in the fantasy epic film L.O.R.D: Legend of Ravaging Dynasties, directed and written by Guo Jingming.

Lin starred in another Stephen Chow film, Journey to the West: Conquering the Demons 2 (2017) where she played the White Bone Spirit. She was also cast in the Disney-made romantic comedy The Dreaming Man, as well as historical epic Genghis Khan.

In 2018, Lin starred in her first television series Battle Through the Heavens, a fantasy wuxia drama based on the novel of the same name. She also starred in Beautiful Reborn Flower, a romance melodrama based on the novel of the same name by Anni Baobei; and music-themed romance drama Cantabile Youth, based on the Japanese manga Nodame Cantabile.

In 2019, Lin starred as the female lead in the romance film Fall in Love at First Kiss, a remake of the Taiwanese series of the same name. She also reprised her role in the second installment of the film, The Mermaid.

In 2024, Lin starred in video clip showing her adventure in Somme, a department of France discovering the Notre-Dame Amiens Cathedral, the old town of Saint-Valery-sur-Somme, or the villas of the Belle Époque in Mers-les-Bains.

== Filmography ==
=== Film ===
Year	English title	Chinese title	Role	Notes
2016	The Mermaid	美人鱼	Shan (the Mermaid)	
2016	L.O.R.D: Legend of Ravaging Dynasties	爵迹	Tianshu Youhua	
2017	Journey to the West: Conquering the Demons 2	西游伏妖篇	White Bone Spirit	
2017	The Dreaming Man	假如王子睡着了	Wang Xiaohe	
2018	Genghis Khan	战神纪	Börte	
2019	Fall in Love at First Kiss	一吻定情	Yuan Xiangqin	
2020	L.O.R.D: Legend of Ravaging Dynasties 2	爵跡2：冷血狂宴	Tianshu Youhua	
2024	Give You a Candy	出入平安	Xiao Yu	
TBA	The Mermaid 2	美人鱼2	Shan (the Mermaid)	

=== Television series ===
Year	English title	Chinese title	Role	Notes
2018	Battle Through the Heavens	斗破苍穹	Xiao Xun'er / Gu Xun'er	
2020	Beautiful Reborn Flower	彼岸花	Qiao Man / Nan Sheng	
2020	Symphony's Romance	蜗牛与黄鹂鸟	Fang Xiaowo	
2022	The Old Dreams	光阴里的故事	Chen Yiduo	
2022	A Dream of Splendor	梦华录	Song Yinzhang	
2023	Imperfect Victim	不完美受害人	Zhao Xun	
2025	Back for You	漫影寻踪	Lin Lili	
2025	Les Belles	怎敌她千娇百媚	Luo Lingyu	
2025	Footprints of Change	足迹	Lin Siyun	
2025	Whispers of Fate	水龙吟	A Shui	
2026	No Pain No Gain	年少有为	Lin Wan	
2026	Live Up to Your Youth	冬去春来	Shen Ranran	
TBA	Let's Fight	来战	Yue Fuxiao	
TBA	Liao Zhai	聊斋	Princess Yao Hua / Chun Hua	
TBA	The Road to Glory	归鸾	Wen Yu	

=== Television show ===
Year	English title	Chinese title	Role	Notes
2016	Run for Time	全员加速中	Cast member	
2018	Twenty-Four Hours	二十四小时	Cast member	
2019	Youth Periplous	青春环游记	Cast member	
2019	Let's Get Married	亲爱的，结婚吧！	Panelist	
2020	My Little One 2	我家那闺女2	Cast member	

== Discography ==
Year	English title	Chinese title	Album	Notes
2018	"Granting You"	许你	Battle Through the Heavens OST	
2019	"My Motherland and I"	我和我的祖国	Qing Chun Wei Zu Guo Er Chang	

== Awards and nominations ==
Year	Award	Category	Nominated work	Result	Ref.
2016	18th Huading Awards	Best New Actress	The Mermaid	Won	
2016	16th New York Asian Film Festival	Rising Star Asia Award	The Mermaid	Won	
2016	3rd China Australia International Film Festival	Best Newcomer	The Mermaid	Won	
2016	12th Chinese American Film Festival	Best Newcomer	The Mermaid	Won	
2017	11th Asian Film Awards	Best Newcomer	The Mermaid	Nominated	
2017	11th Asian Film Awards	Rising Star of Asia Award	The Mermaid	Won	
2017	36th Hong Kong Film Award	Best New Performer	The Mermaid	Nominated	
2018	23rd Huading Awards	Best Supporting Actress	Journey to the West: Conquering the Demons 2	Nominated	
2019	Cosmo Glam Night	Person of The Year (Love)	—N/a	Won	
2020	7th The Actors of China Award Ceremony	Best Actress (Web series)	—N/a	Pending	
