= My Roommate Is a Detective =

- Genre: Detective, Mystery, Comedy
- Directed by: Zhang Wei Ke
- Country of origin: China
- Original language: Standard Mandarin
- No. of episodes: 36

Original release
- Network: iQiyi
- Release: March 24, 2020

My Roommate Is a Detective (Chinese: 民国奇探; pinyin: Mínguó qí tàn) is a 2020 Chinese streaming television series starring Hu Yitian, Zhang Yunlong and Xiao Yan. Set in the International Settlement of Shanghai in 1925, the series follows Lu Yao as he becomes involved in a murder investigation. Due to his intelligence and deductive reasoning skills, he is invited by detective inspector Qiao Chusheng to serve as a consultant in solving cases. The two, together with journalist Bai Youning, form a team and investigate a series of unusual murder cases. The trio's contrasting personalities and frequent banter provide comedic elements alongside the series' mystery and detective storylines. Filming began on March 31, 2019 in Shanghai, and the series premiered on iQiyi on March 24, 2020.

== Cast ==
- Hu Yitian as Lu Yao
- Zhang Yunlong as Qiao Chusheng
- Xiao Yan as Bai Youning
- Zhang Huizhong as White Boss
- Dev Raturi
