= This Group of People =

Taiwanese comedy YouTube channel

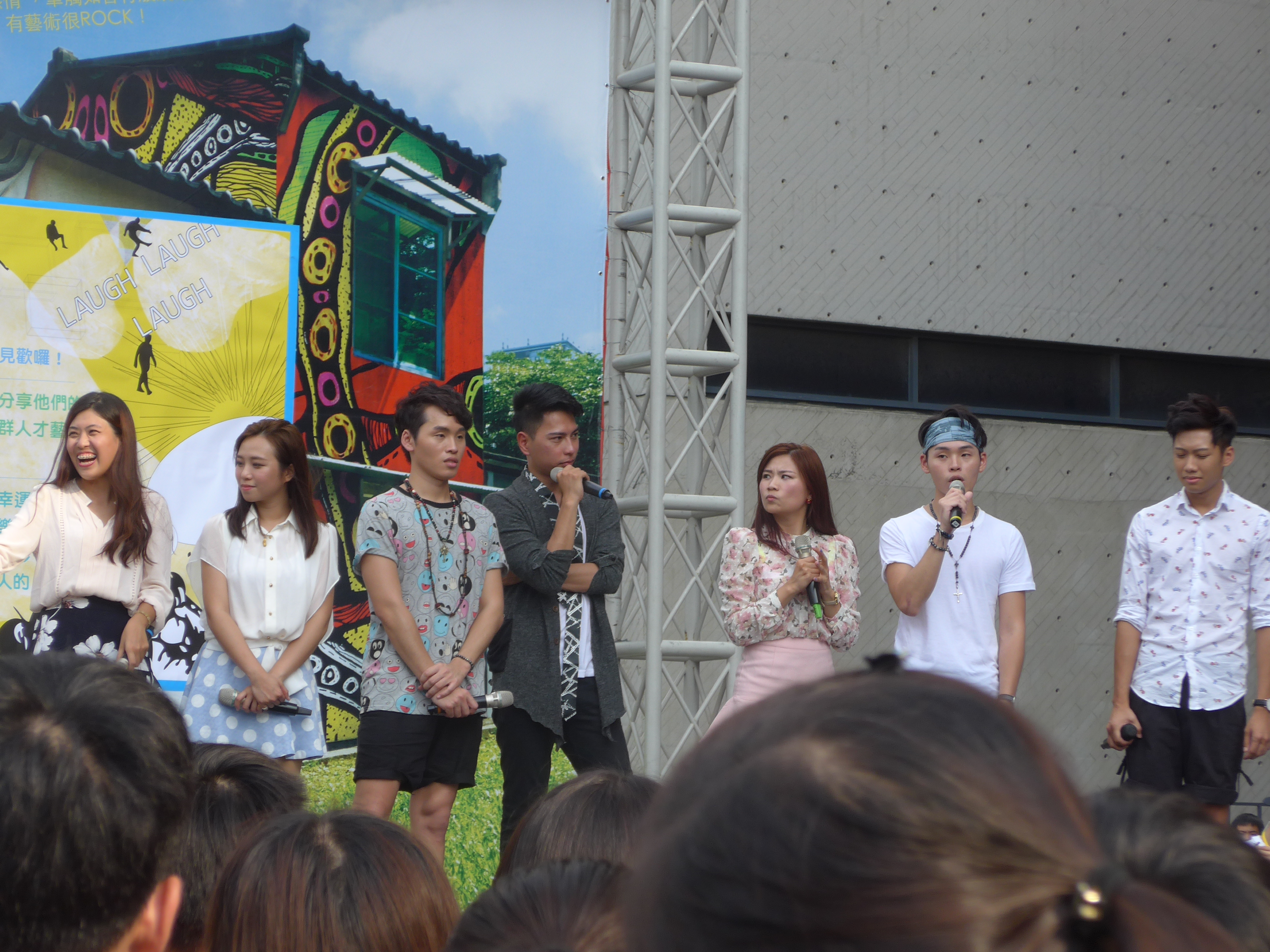
- The group at a fan meetup in Taichung

YouTube information
- Channel: TGOP (This Group Of People)
- Years active: 2011–2024
- Genres: Comedy; Music
- Subscribers: 3.45 million
- Views: 1.23 billion
- Last updated: October 21, 2025

This Group Of People (TGOP) is a Taiwanese comedy YouTube channel.

== Popularity ==
The channel was the most subscribed YouTube channel in Taiwan as of 2018. The channel was also the first channel from Taiwan to hit over 1 million subscribers and, in 2017, the first channel to hit over 2 million.

== History ==
The group member first collaborated in 2008 for a high school drama group, but the group disbanded later. In 2011, the group got back together starting to film comedy sketches. By August 2016, their channel became the first in Taiwan to hit 1 million subscribers, which they celebrated by releasing the first 'Super Lousy Cover Songs' video. By 2020, TGOP hit 3.3 million subscribers.

In February 2024 the channel announced to stop regularly uploading new videos, citing the need for rest and each member wanting to experiment with different types of content.

== Content ==
=== Series ===
- Classic Quotation
- My Baby is the Best: in collaboration with Shaogao
- Lousy Cover Songs: foreign top 40 songs translated into Mandarin and Taiwanese, and their music videos imitated in a visibly improvised manner by the group members.
- Boring News
- The Coworkers

== Members ==
Name	Chinese name	Birth name	Birth date	Gender	Occupation
Keelong	展榮 (Zhǎnróng)	許展榮 (Xǔ Zhǎnróng)	February 3, 1988 (age 38)	M	Actor, director, writer
Rays	展瑞 (Zhǎnruì)	許展瑞 (Xǔ Zhǎnruì)	February 3, 1988 (age 38)	M	Actor, director, writer
Alina	茵聲 (Yīnshēng)	鄭茵聲 (Zhèng Yīnshēng)	March 28, 1988 (age 37)	F	Actor
Jupiter	木星 (Mùxīng)	林牧昕 (Lín Mùxīn)	January 9, 1988 (age 38)	F	Actor, set designer
Hannah	董仔 (Dǒngzaǐ)	董芷涵 (Dǒng Zhǐhán)	August 28, 1988 (age 37)	F	Actor, producer
Nick	尼克 (Níkè)	王士維 (Wáng Shìwéi)	April 20, 1988 (age 37)	M	Actor, writer
Stone	石頭 (Shítou)	張佑維 (Zhāng Yòuwéi)	March 9, 1988 (age 38)	M	Director, writer, lead camera operator

=== Guest appearances ===
The channel's popularity and local celebrity status have allowed them to attract celebrity guest stars such as:

- Lee Chien-na in Classic Quotes for Breaking Up
- G.E.M. in When My Girl Friend Wants To Watch TV Series
- William Xie (謝祖武) in Comparison of Classical and Contemporary Chinese

== Discography ==
The group has also released several pop music singles.

Name	Chinese name	Date	Singers	Note
Naughty	皮在癢	2014	Three people (Note: Keelong, Rays, Alina Cheng)	
This Is Me	這是我	2016	Three People	
Straw	稻草	2018	Alina Cheng	
Flash Back	閃退	2018	Keelong and Rays	
Love Date	愛情日期	2018	Alina Cheng	
Stuck	卡關	2018	Three People	
Night Owls	夜式人生	2019	Keelong and Rays	
Just Let It Go	乾脆放手	2019	Keelong and Rays	
Control	掌控對決	2019	Keelong and Rays	
Not Anymore	安靜了太久	2019	Keelong and Rays	
Mad Love	愛瘋狂	2019	Keelong and Rays	
Do it till we die	做到死	2020	TGOP	
Ten years of me	十年的我	2020	TGOP	

== Related channels ==
- T.G.O.P. vlog, behind the scenes and travel videos of group members
- Keelong and Rays, vlog and interview channel of Keelong and Rays
- T.G.O.P. ads, advertising work
- Alina Cheng, music videos
