= Zhang Yunlong =

Chinese actor

- Born: 2 March 1988 (age 38); Dalian, Liaoning, China
- Other names: Leon Zhang, Jack Zhang
- Education: Beijing Film Academy
- Occupation: Actor
- Years active: 2012–present
- Agent: Jay Walk Studio

Zhang Yunlong (Chinese: 张云龙; born 2 March 1988), also known as Leon or Jack Zhang, is a Chinese actor.

== Career ==
Zhang Yunlong made his debut in the theater play, Thunderstorm, and acted in several short films. In 2012, Zhang won the Best Actor award at the Beijing Student Original Film Competition for his performance in Love Express.

In 2013, after graduating from Beijing Film Academy, he was chosen by Yang Mi to star in her self-produced series, V Love. The same year, he featured in the hit fantasy action drama Swords of Legends. He continued to appear in small but notable supporting roles in the dramas Destined to Love You and The Interpreter and the film Forever Young.

In 2016, he headlined his first drama, animal-themed romance series Hero Dog 2; followed by sci-fi romance drama Special Beautiful Man.

In 2017, he starred in the romance film Mr. Pride vs Miss Prejudice, and won the Best Chivalry award at the China Britain Film Festival for his performance. The same year, he headlined the fantasy action drama Xuan-Yuan Sword: Han Cloud; as well as featured in the Disney-made romantic comedy film The Dreaming Man.

In 2019, Zhang starred in the fantasy science fiction drama My Poseidon, and workplace romance drama In Youth. The same year, he starred in the police film S.W.A.T. directed by Ding Sheng.

In 2020, Zhang starred in the republican detective drama My Roommate Is a Detective as a former gangster who becomes a police officer. Zhang received positive reviews for his performance, as well as chemistry with co-star Hu Yitian; and gained wider popularity as a result.

In 2021, he joined the cast of Call Me by Fire as a contestant. He also returned for the second season of Call Me by Fire.

== Filmography ==
=== Film ===
Year	English Title	Chinese Title	Role	Notes/Ref.
2011	Song and Moon	行歌坐月	Xiao Yao	
2012	Youth of Dreams	天秤	Ding Liang	
2012	The Walker	起床师		Short film
2012	Love Express	爱的速递		Short film
2012	Sensitive Heart	敏感de心		Short film
2015	Forever Young	栀子花开	Wei Ge	
2015	Fall in Love Like a Star	怦然星动	Gao Mang	
2017	Mr. Pride vs Miss Prejudice	傲娇与偏见	Zhu Hou	
2017	The Dreaming Man	假如王子睡着了	Zheng Tianle	
2019	S.W.A.T.	特警队	Zhao Hailong	
2021	1921	一九二一	Zhou Fohai	

=== Television series ===
Year	English Title	Chinese Title	Role	Network	Notes/Ref.
2012	The Mother	大地情深	Yin Suo	Hubei TV	
2014	A Different Kind of Pretty Man	不一样的美男子	An Yifei	Hunan TV	
2014	Swords of Legends	古剑奇谭	Hei Yao	Hunan TV	
2014	V Love	微时代之恋	Hua Youxi	Tencent	
2015	Destined to Love You	偏偏喜欢你	Gu Xiaobai	Hunan TV	
2015	There Will Be Fireworks	花火	Zhao Zhen'nan	Zhejiang TV	
2016	The Interpreter	亲爱的翻译官	Wang Xudong	Hunan TV	
2016	Hero Dog 2	神犬小七第二季	Bao Yu	Hunan TV	
2017	Special Beautiful Man	不一样的美男子2	Guan Hao	Hunan TV	
2017	Xuan-Yuan Sword: Han Cloud	轩辕剑之汉之云	Zhao Yun	Dragon TV	
2019	My Poseidon	我的波塞冬	Ye Hai	Mango TV	
2019	In Youth	趁我们还年轻	Fan Shuchen	Dragon TV	
2020	Eternal Love of Dream	三生三世枕上书	Cang Yi	Tencent	Guest appearance
2020	My Roommate Is a Detective	民国奇探	Qiao Chusheng	iQiyi	
2020	Jian Ai Nan Nu	鉴爱男女	The God of Blind Date	Tencent	Cameo
2020	Together	在一起	Wang Ke	Dragon TV/Zhejiang TV/Jiangsu TV/Guangdong TV/Hubei TV	
2020	Drawing Sword 3	雷霆战将	Wang Yunshan	Hunan TV	
2021	1 Vs 100 Dream Boys (Dream It ! Jingjing)	做梦吧！晶晶		Douyin	
2021		173米	Xia Li	Hunan	
2021	New Generation : Happiness Method (EP.25-32)	我们的新时代: 幸福的处方	Hai Yang	Beijing Satellite TV/Dragon TV/Shenzhen Satellite TV/Heilongjiang Satellite/iQiyi/Tencent/Youku	
2021	Ancient Love Poetry	千古玦尘	Jing Jian	Tencent/WeTV	
2021	Tears in Heaven	海上繁花	Shao Zhenrong	Mango TV/LeTV/iQiyi/Youku/Tencent	
2021	The Great Battle	大决战	Lin Zhiwen	CCTV-1, iQIYI	Guest appearance
2022	Player	玩家		Youku	
2022	Embroidered Spring Knife: Shadow of Mountains and Rivers	绣春刀·山河之影	Li Wu	iQIYI	
2024	My Special Girl	独一有二的她	Gu Jiuli	iQIYI	
2025	Unnatural Fire	燃罪	Xu Tongsheng	iQIYI	
2025	Love in Pavilion	淮水竹亭	Wangquan Hong Ye	iQIYI	

=== Variety and reality show ===
Year	English title	Chinese title	Notes
2022	Call Me by Fire	披荆斩棘	Season 2

== Discography ==
Year	English Title	Chinese Title	Album	Notes
2013	"First Love"	初恋	Love Express OST	
2014	"Our Generation"	我们的时代	V Love OST	
2014	"Colorful Youth"	青春不留白	V Love OST	
2017	"Mr. Pride vs Miss Prejudice"	傲娇与偏见	Mr. Pride vs Miss Prejudice OST	with Dilraba Dilmurat
2019	"It is Raining, Where are You"	下雨了，你在哪里	My Poseidon OST	with Eleanor Lee
2019	"In Youth"	趁年轻	In Youth OST	
2020	"Together"	在一起	Together	

== Awards and nominations ==
Year	Award	Category	Nominated work	Result	Ref.
2014	Beijing Student Original Film Competition	Best Actor (Original film)	Love Express	Won	
2014	Fashion Power Awards	Newcomer Award	—N/a	Won	
2016	China Britain Film Festival	Best Chivalry	Mr. Pride vs Miss Prejudice	Won	
2016	Chinese Campus Art Glory Festival	Most Popular Actor	—N/a	Won	
2017	Men's UNO YOUNG Awards	Trend Actor	—N/a	Won	
2019	CCTV Spring Gala	Youth Role Model	—N/a	Won	
2020	Golden Bud - The Fifth Network Film And Television Festival	Leaping Actor of the Year	N/A	Won	
