= Hu Yitian =

Chinese actor

- 胡一天
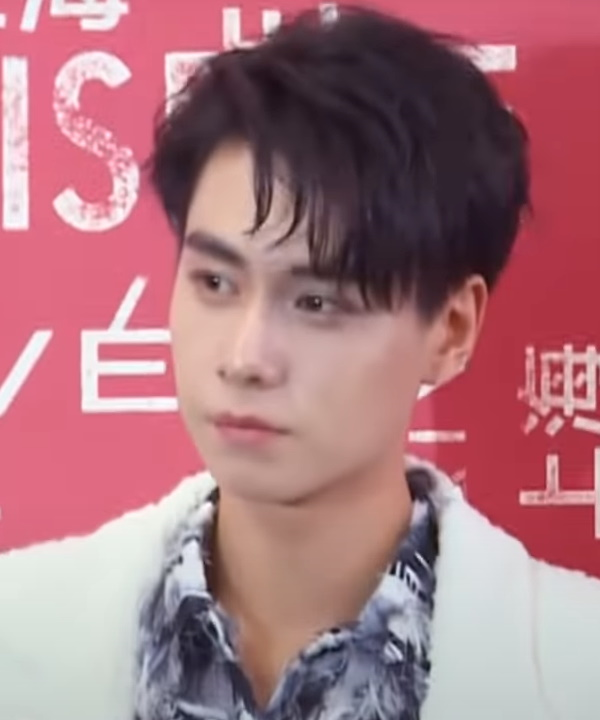
- Hu in 2019
- Born: 26 December 1993 (age 32); Hangzhou, Zhejiang, China
- Education: Hangzhou Wanxiang Polytechnic; Zhejiang Sci-Tech University
- Occupations: Actor; model
- Years active: 2016–present
- Agent(s): Zhejiang Huace Film & TV

Hu Yitian (Chinese: 胡一天; Chinese: 胡壹天; pinyin: Hú Yītiān; born 26 December 1993) is a Chinese actor. He made his acting debut in the television drama A Rush to Dead Summer (2017), and subsequently starred in the 2017 hit web series A Love So Beautiful.

== Early life and education ==
Hu was born on 26 December 1993 in Hangzhou, Zhejiang, China. He majored in landscape architecture at Hangzhou Wanxiang Polytechnic. Hu worked briefly as a model before debuting as an actor.

== Career ==
=== Beginnings ===
Hu first appeared in a series of short films titled Cat Tree. He made his official debut in the youth drama Rush to the Dead Summer (2017), playing a minor supporting role.

=== 2017–present: Rising popularity ===
Hu rose to fame with his role as Jiang Chen in the 2017 hit web series A Love So Beautiful, based on the youth romance novel To Our Pure Little Beauty by Zhao Gangan. Hu also performed the ending theme song for the series, titled "It's a Dream".

From February to April 2018, Hu appeared in the third season of the reality game show Twenty-Four Hours as a regular cast member. Hu was also cast in youth workplace drama Youth Should Be Early, and youth romance drama Unrequited Love.

In 2019, Hu featured in the esports romance comedy drama Go Go Squid! as a computer genius. Despite his short appearance in the series, Hu gained popularity for his role. Forbes China listed Hu under their 30 Under 30 Asia 2019 list which consisted of 30 influential people under 30 years old who have had a substantial effect in their fields.

In 2020, Hu starred in Handsome Siblings, a wuxia drama based on Gu Long's 1966 novel Juedai Shuangjiao; playing Hua Wuque. The series received positive reviews and high ratings, and Hu was praised for his portrayal of Hua Wuque. The same year, he starred in the republican mystery drama My Roommate is a Detective as a deduction genius. Hu received positive reviews for his humorous performance as a deduction genius, a stark contrast from his previous characters; as well as chemistry with co-star Zhang Yunlong.

== Filmography ==
=== Film ===
Year	English title	Chinese title	Role	Notes	Ref.
2017	A Gentle Place	总有一处柔软的地方		Short film	
2018	One Day	有那么一天		Short film	

=== Television series ===
Year	English title	Chinese title	Role	Network	Ref.
2017	Rush to the Dead Summer	夏至未至	Ou Jun	Hunan TV	
2017	A Love So Beautiful	致我们单纯的小美好	Jiang Chen	Tencent, Netflix	
2019	Go Go Squid!	亲爱的，热爱的	Wu Bai (DT)	Dragon TV, Zhejiang TV	
2020	Handsome Siblings	绝代双骄	Hua Wuque / Jiang Feng	CCTV, Netflix	
2020	My Roommate is a Detective	民国奇探	Lu Yao	iQIYI	
2020	You Complete Me	小风暴之时间的玫瑰	Gao Shan	Tencent	
2021	Unrequited Love	暗恋橘生淮南	Sheng Huainan	Mango TV	
2021	Dt.Appledog's Time	我的时代，你的时代	Wu Bai (DT)	iQIYI	
2021	Youth Should Be Early	青春须早为	Zheng Qian	Mango TV	
2022	Hello, the Sharpshooter	你好，神枪手	Shen Qing Yuan	Tencent	
2022	Defying the Storm	凭栏一片风云起	Zhang Qi	Hunan TV	
2022	Checkmate	民国大侦探	Situ Yan	iQIYI	
2022	See You Again	超时空罗曼史	Xiang Qinyu / Chi Yu	iQIYI	
2024	Blossoms in Adversity	惜花芷	Gu Yanxi	Youku	
2024	Men in Love	请和这样的我恋爱吧	Ye Han	iQIYI	
2026	Genius Girlfriend	天才女友	Jiang Yu Bai	iQIYI	

=== Variety show ===
Year	English title	Chinese title	Role	Network	Ref.
2018	Twenty-Four Hours	二十四小时第三季	Cast member	Zhejiang TV	
2019	Magical Chinese Character	神奇的汉字	Cast member	Hunan TV	

== Discography ==
=== Soundtrack appearances ===
Year	English title	Chinese title	Album	Ref.
2017	"It's a Dream"	是梦吧	A Love So Beautiful OST	
2019	"Magical Chinese Character"	神奇的汉字	Magical Chinese Character OST	

== Awards and nominations ==
Year	Event	Category	Nominated work	Result	Ref.
2017	24th Cosmo Beauty Ceremony	Beautiful Idol	—N/a	Won	
2017	11th Tencent Video Star Awards	Most Promising Actor	A Love So Beautiful	Won	
2017	9th China TV Drama Awards	New Generation Young Actor Award	A Love So Beautiful	Won	
2018	24th Huading Awards	Best Newcomer	A Love So Beautiful	Nominated	
2018	L'Officiel Fashion Night	Influence Award	—N/a	Won	
2019	Lizhi Annual Gala	Voice of the Year	—N/a	Won	
2019	Cosmo Glam Night	Person of the Year (Love)	—N/a	Won	
2019	8th iQIYI All-Star Carnival	Most Promising Artist	—N/a	Won	
2020	7th The Actors of China Award	Best Actor (Emerald)	Go Go Squid!	Nominated	
2020	7th The Actors of China Award	Outstanding Actor	Go Go Squid!	Won	
2020	12th China TV Drama Awards	Highly Concerned Actor	Handsome Siblings	Won	
