= List of Keep Running episodes =

Keep Running (Chinese: 奔跑吧; pinyin: Bēnpǎo Ba), previously known as Running Man China (Chinese: 奔跑吧兄弟; pinyin: Bēnpǎo Ba Xiōngdì), is a Chinese variety show, broadcast on ZMG: Zhejiang Television. This show is classified as a game-variety show, where the MCs and guests complete missions in a landmark to win a race which would provide hints/items to later help them. The show first aired on October 10, 2014.

As of July 10, 2026, 215 episodes of Running Man China have been aired. There are also 5 pilots, 5 special episodes, and a movie.

== Series overview ==
Season	Episodes	Originally aired	
Season	Episodes	Premiere	Finale
Season 1	15	10 October 2014	16 January 2015
Season 2	12	17 April 2015	3 July 2015
Season 3	12	30 October 2015	15 January 2016
Season 4	12	15 April 2016	1 July 2016
Season 5	12	14 April 2017	30 June 2017
Season 6	12	13 April 2018	29 June 2018
Season 7	12	26 April 2019	12 July 2019
Season 8	12	29 May 2020	14 August 2020
Yellow River season 1	6	5 December 2020	8 January 2021
Season 9	13	23 April 2021	16 July 2021
Yellow River season 2	5	22 October 2021	26 November 2021
Season 10	12	13 May 2022	29 July 2022
Let's Build a Better Life	8	4 November 2022	30 December 2022
Season 11	12	14 April 2023	21 July 2023
Nature Season	7	18 November 2023	30 December 2023
Season 12	12	19 April 2024	12 July 2024
The Ancient Tea-Horse Road	8	23 November 2024	11 January 2025
Season 13	13	25 April 2025	18 July 2025
The Heavenly Road	8	22 November 2025	10 January 2026
Season 14	12	24 April 2026	10 July 2026
The Greater Bay Area	TBA	21 November 2026	TBA

== Episodes ==
If more than one set of teams are used other than the Race Mission teams, they are divided and distinguished to the corresponding mission under Teams. Team members are listed in alphabetical order from Team Leader to Members, to Guests. As some episodes consisted of road missions and were not confined to a single landmark nor was a landmark officially recognized on-air, the landmark shown for those episodes is the final mission venue.

=== Season 1 ===
(episodes 1-15)

=== Special episodes ===
(Series) Episode #	(Season) Episode #	Broadcast Date	Guest(s)	Landmark	Teams	Mission	Result
S1	1/SP	January 23, 2015 (January 9, 2015)	Chen Yufan, Hu Haiquan (Yu Quan), Chen Huan, Cyndi Wang, G-Dragon, JJ Lin, Show Lo, Yi Yi	National Exhibition Centre (Hongqiao Business District, Changning, Shanghai)	Special Episode: 2015 Running Man Ceremony Hosts (Chen Huan, Yi Yi); Deng Chao Team (Deng Chao, Wong Cho-lam, Chen He, Chen Yufan, Hu Haiquan, Cyndi Wang); Li Chen Team (Li Chen, Angelababy, Zheng Kai, Show Lo); Special Guests (Note: G-Dragon and JJ Lin appeared in the episode to help with the speech-related task.) (G-Dragon, JJ Lin)	Defeat the other team	Li Chen Team Wins; They receive a Lamando vehicle that they donate to a charity that provides running shoes to needy children.
S2	2/SP	February 8, 2016 (TBA)	Residents from all nations	Running Man Show HQ	Special Episode: 2016 Running Man Spring Festival Mission Special	Defeat the other team	Luhan Team Wins
S3	3/SP	December 8, 2024 (TBA)	Dong Sicheng, Zhou Jieqiong, Meng Jia, Lars Huang, Gao Hanyu, After Journey, Isabelle Huang	Aksu Prefecture, Xinjiang, China	Special Episode: Keep Running: Aksu-Alar	The cast members to successfully navigate historical, physical, and psychological challenges to earn spots in the "Twin Pearls Cultural Honor Group" (双珠文化荣誉团).	The cumulative points earned across all games were ultimately used to unlock and heavily promote Xinjiang's local specialties—including Kuqa Naan, unique local fruits irrigated by Tianshan snow water, and regional tourism landmarks. The episode ended on an uplifting note, honoring the real-life builders who have worked over the decade to link Zhejiang and Xinjiang.

=== Season 2 ===
(episodes 16-27)

=== Season 3 ===
(episodes 28-39)

=== Season 4 ===
(episodes 40-51)

=== Season 5 ===
(episodes 52-63)

=== Season 6 ===
(episodes 64-75)

=== Season 7 ===
(episodes 76-87)

=== Season 8 ===
(episodes 88-99)

=== Yellow River season 1 ===
(episodes 100-105)

=== Season 9 ===
(episodes 106-118)

=== Yellow River season 2 ===
(episodes 119-123)

=== Season 10 ===
(episodes 124-135)

=== Let's Build a Better Life ===
(episodes 136-143)

=== Season 11 ===
(episodes 144-155)

=== Nature Season ===
(episodes 156-162)

=== Season 12 ===
(episodes 163-174)

=== The Ancient Tea Horse Road ===
(episodes 175-182)

=== Season 13 ===
(episodes 183-195)

=== The Heavenly Road ===
(episodes 196-203)

=== Season 14 ===
(episodes 204-215)

=== The Greater Bay Area ===
(episodes 216-TBD)
