= Keep Running (TV program) =

Chinese television series, 2014–present

- 奔跑吧
- Genre: Game-variety-Entertainment
- Based on: Running Man by SBS
- Directed by: Yao Yitian (all non-special seasons since season 4, Yellow River season 1); You Minchao (all special seasons since Let's Build a Better Life)
- Starring: Current cast members: Li Chen; Zheng Kai; Sha Yi; Bai Lu; Fan Chengcheng; Yuqi; Zhang Zhenyuan; Meng Ziyi; Li Yunrui; Former cast members: Wang Baoqiang; Bao Bei'er; Dilraba Dilmurat; Deng Chao; Chen He; Wong Cho-lam; Lu Han; Zhu Yawen; Wang Yanlin; Guo Qilin; Lucas; Lin Yi; Cai Xukun; Angelababy; Zhou Shen
- Opening theme: "Super Hero 超级英雄" by Deng Chao "造亿万吨光芒" by Li Chen, Angelababy, Zheng Kai, Zhu Yawen, Wang Yanlin, Lucas, Yuqi "Keep Running 奔跑吧" by Li Chen, Zheng Kai, Sha Yi, Bai Lu, Zhou Shen, Fan Chengcheng, Yuqi, Zhang Zhenyuan, Meng Ziyi, Li Yunrui
- Country of origin: China
- Original language: Chinese
- No. of seasons: 14 (Note: Excluding 7 special seasons.)
- No. of episodes: 215 (list of episodes)

Production
- Producer: Im Hyung-taek
- Production locations: China (most episodes); South Korea (1/03-1/05, 4/05, 4/07); Northern Mariana Islands (2/11-2/12); Australia (3/11-3/12); Czech Republic (5/11-5/12); Austria (6/01-6/03); Macau (7/11-7/12, 13/11-13/12); Thailand (11/11-11/12); Hungary (12/11-12/12)
- Camera setup: Multi-camera
- Running time: 80-100 minutes
- Production company: SBS (supervising company)

Original release
- Network: ZMG: Zhejiang Television
- Release: 10 October 2014 – present

Related
- Running Man (Korean); Running Man (Philippines)

Keep Running (Chinese: 奔跑吧; pinyin: Bēnpǎo Ba), previously known as Running Man China, or Hurry Up, Brother (Chinese: 奔跑吧兄弟; pinyin: Bēnpǎo Ba Xiōngdì) before 2017, is a Chinese variety show broadcast on ZMG: Zhejiang Television. It is a spin-off from the popular original South Korean variety show Running Man by SBS. It was first aired on 10 October 2014. The show is classified as a game-variety show, where the MCs and guests complete missions at a landmark to win a race.

The program has itself also been spun-off into a supplemental show, named Here Comes the Man (Chinese: 跑男来了; pinyin: Pǎonán Láile). It is hosted by Shen Tao (Chinese: 沈涛; pinyin: Shěn Tāo), Luo Xi (Chinese: 罗希; pinyin: Luó Xī), and/or "Jenny" Lin Jieni (Chinese: 林杰妮; pinyin: Lín Jiénī). The show typically centers around secondary footage of Keep Running episodes, behind-the-scenes clips, or even the conclusion or final outcomes of a Keep Running episode that is too long to fit into the original broadcast time slot.

== Program name ==
When the show was first announced, it was known as "跑男" (pinyin: Pǎo Nán) or "Running Man" in Chinese. Programs on the Zhejiang TV channel required names with five Chinese characters (words), hence the program was then renamed to "奔跑吧兄弟" or Hurry Up, Brother. But before the official name changed, ZRTG had registered "跑男" as a trademark with the SAIC.

The supplemental show "跑男来了" continues to retain the "跑男" moniker in its title.

== Episode style ==
撕名牌 (pinyin: Sī Míngpái) or "Name-tag Elimination" (lit. 'name-tag ripping' or 'name-tag tearing') is one of the main games of each episode and is usually the longest game. There are also many games played by the MCs and guests that often contribute to their result for the final mission.

The team that wins the final mission will receive a prize, usually related to the theme of the episode. However, even if a team wins most of the games, victory is not guaranteed (for example, in Season 1 Episode 2, Deng Chao did not win many games, but the other teams who had won did not make the right choices of switching the waters, therefore causing their team to win).

== Personnel ==
=== Cast members ===
The original members of Running Man are Deng Chao, Angelababy, Li Chen, Chen He, Zheng Kai, Wong Cho-lam, and Wang Baoqiang.

After season 1, Wang Baoqiang left the program to focus on his career but returned on season 3, episode 10 as a guest.

In season 2, Bao Bei'er replaced Wang Baoqiang but left at the end of the season as he was cast in Stephen Chow's Journey to the West II.

Singer Lu Han then replaced Bao Bei'er from season 3 to season 6.

Dilraba Dilmurat replaced Angelababy in season 5 due to Angelababy's pregnancy. Due to scheduling conflicts, Dilraba left before season 6.

For season 7, Deng Chao, Chen He, and Lu Han left due to scheduling conflicts, while Wong Cho-Lam left to focus on his family. Lucas from South Korean boy group NCT and its Chinese unit WayV, Song Yuqi from South Korean girl group I-dle, and actors Zhu Yawen and Wang Yanlin replaced them in the new season.

For season 8, Zhu Yawen and Wang Yanlin left due to scheduling conflicts. Singer Cai Xukun, actor/comedian Guo Qilin, and actor Sha Yi joined as new members and replaced them. Lucas and Song Yuqi, who are both based in South Korea, were absent for the whole season due to COVID-19 pandemic and travel restrictions.

For the first Yellow River special season, Lucas and Yuqi were again absent. Cai Xukun only participated in episodes 1-2 due to scheduling conflicts, while Guo Qilin only participated in episodes 3-4 due to scheduling conflicts. Zheng Kai was absent from episodes 1-2 due to the birth of his daughter.

For Season 9, Guo Qilin left the cast due to scheduling conflicts while Lucas and Yuqi rejoined the cast. Yuqi was absent from the first few episodes due to quarantine restrictions.

For Season 10, it was announced that due to scheduling conflicts, Lucas would not be involved in filming, while Yuqi left to focus on her career. Actress Bai Lu, who joined during the second Yellow River special season, and singer Zhou Shen joined the cast. Meanwhile, Cai Xukun returned after a temporary hiatus in the second Yellow River season. Zheng Kai was absent for the second half of the season, starting from episode 7, due to the birth of his second child.

For the Common Prosperity special season, Cai Xukun only participated in the first two journeys, which spanned the first two-and-a-half episodes. Zhou Shen only participated in the first three journeys, which spanned episodes 1-4.

For Season 11, it was announced that due to his upcoming tour, Cai Xukun would not be participating. Yuqi rejoined the cast, and Fan Chengcheng from the Chinese boy group NEXT also joined as a new cast member.

For the Nature special season, it was announced that Angelababy would not be participating, while Zhang Zhenyuan from the Chinese boy group TNT joined as a new cast member. This member setup was retained in Season 12.

During the Ancient Tea Horse Road special season, both Yuqi and Zhou Shen only appeared in episodes 6-8 due to scheduling conflicts. Fan Chengcheng also did not participate in this season, as he was filming a television show at the time.

For Season 13, Li Chen, Zheng Kai, Yuqi, Sha Yi, Bai Lu, Zhou Shen, Fan Chengcheng and Zhang Zhenyuan reunited and were joined by Meng Ziyi and Li Yunrui as Running Friends. The newest cast members had been guests during the previous Tea Horse Road Season and starred in the Chinese drama Blossom.

For The Heavenly Road special season, Zhou Shen and Meng Ziyi were unable to participate due to schedule conflicts.

For Season 14, Meng Ziyi and Li Yunrui were promoted to full cast members. Zhou Shen was unable to participate due to his tour. Yuqi was absent due to recovery from a recent head injury and other schedule conflicts. This member setup was retained in The Greater Bay Area special season.

Cast members	Season																				
Cast members	1	2	3	4	5	6	7	8	YR1	9	YR2	10	CP	11	Eco	12	Tea	13	HR	14	GBA
Deng Chao																					
Angelababy																					
Li Chen																					
Chen He																					
Zheng Kai																					
Wong Cho-lam																					
Wang Baoqiang																					
Bao Bei'er																					
Lu Han																					
Dilraba Dilmurat																					
Zhu Yawen																					
Wang Yanlin																					
Song Yuqi																					
Lucas																					
Cai Xukun																					
Sha Yi																					
Guo Qilin																					
Lin Yi																					
Bai Lu																					
Zhou Shen																					
Fan Chengcheng																					
Zhang Zhenyuan																					
Meng Ziyi																					
Li Yunrui																					

=== Production staff ===
The chief production director (PD) is Yao Yitian, who is often referred to on the show by his nickname "Yao PD". His voice is typically the one heard during interactions between cast members and the production crew. He has also at various times been featured on-camera during the show, such as during the last episode of Season 9, "Cast members vs. Production team", where he was nominated by the cast members to be one of the production team members to undergo the final "giant water bomb" punishment if the cast members were able to beat the production team, and episode 8 of Season 10, where he was pulled on-camera by one of the teams to be their extra helper during one of the games.

The announcer and provider of most of the voice-overs is He Yannan (Chinese: 何雁南; pinyin: Hé Yànnán), who is a radio host for Zhejiang Radio and Television Group and also provides voice-over for various other Zhejiang Television programs, such as The Voice of China.

=== Guests with the most appearances ===
Some guests were occasionally featured or invited to the show during its run. The following list is of guests who appeared the most often as of 10 July 2026.

Rank	Name	No. of episodes	Episodes	Occupation
1	Wei Daxun	18	5/01, 6/12, YR2/05, 10/09-10/10, LBaBL/01, LBaBL/05, 11/09-11/10, NS/04-NS/07, 12/06-12/08, 12/12, 14/03	Actor
2	Yu Yang	11	YR1/05, 9/04, 9/13, YR2/01-YR2/02, 10/05, 12/07, TATHRS/04-TATHRS/05, 14/05, 14/10	Actor/Host
3	Meng Ziyi	10	YR1/06, 9/12, 10/01, 11/08, NS/01-NS/03, TATHRS/03-TATHRS/05	Actress
4	Zhai Zilu	9	TATHRS/03-TATHRS/04, 13/06, THR/01-THR/04, 14/05-14/06	Actor
5	Sie Yi-lin	7	1/02, 1/09, Movie, 12/07, TATHRS/01-TATHRS/02, 13/11	Actress
6	Jackson Wang	6	5/06, 7/06-7/07, 8/06, 9/10-9/11	Rapper
6	Song Zu'er	6	6/02-6/03, 8/09, YR1/03-YR1/04, 9/12	Actress
6	Yang Di	6	7/03, 7/07, 8/02, 10/08, LBaBL/06, 14/09	Actor/Host
6	Tang Jiuzhou	6	10/02, NS/04-NS/07, 14/06	Singer
6	Dylan Wang	6	10/02-10/03, 11/11-11/12, 12/10, 13/04	Actor
6	Zhang Ruonan	6	LBaBL/06, 11/06, 12/05, 13/09, 14/11-14/12	Actress
6	Chen Zheyuan	6	LBaBL/07-LBaBL/08, 11/02, 12/05, 13/12, 14/02	Actor
6	Huang Xinchun	6	11/07, NS/03-NS/04, 13/11, 14/09-14/10	Singer
6	Ao Ruipeng	6	12/03, 13/06, THR/01-THR/04	Actor

== List of episodes ==
If more than one set of teams are used other than the Race Mission teams, they are divided and distinguished to the corresponding mission under Teams. Team members are listed in alphabetical order from Team Leader to Members, to Guests. As some episodes consisted of road missions and were not confined to a single landmark nor was a landmark officially recognized on-air, the landmark shown for those episodes is the final mission venue.

=== Series overview ===
Season	Episodes	Originally aired	
Season	Episodes	Premiere	Finale
Season 1	15	10 October 2014	16 January 2015
Season 2	12	17 April 2015	3 July 2015
Season 3	12	30 October 2015	15 January 2016
Season 4	12	15 April 2016	1 July 2016
Season 5	12	14 April 2017	30 June 2017
Season 6	12	13 April 2018	29 June 2018
Season 7	12	26 April 2019	12 July 2019
Season 8	12	29 May 2020	14 August 2020
Yellow River season 1	6	5 December 2020	8 January 2021
Season 9	13	23 April 2021	16 July 2021
Yellow River season 2	5	22 October 2021	26 November 2021
Season 10	12	13 May 2022	29 July 2022
Let's Build a Better Life	8	4 November 2022	30 December 2022
Season 11	12	14 April 2023	21 July 2023
Nature Season	7	18 November 2023	30 December 2023
Season 12	12	19 April 2024	12 July 2024
The Ancient Tea-Horse Road	8	23 November 2024	11 January 2025
Season 13	13	25 April 2025	18 July 2025
The Heavenly Road	8	22 November 2025	10 January 2026
Season 14	12	24 April 2026	10 July 2026
The Greater Bay Area	TBA	21 November 2026	TBA

=== Movie ===
Running Man is a 2015 Chinese reality comedy film directed by Hu Jia and Cen Junyi. Deng Chao was unable to participate in the movie filming due to scheduling conflicts. The movie was released to theaters on 30 January 2015.

(Series) Episode #	(Season) Episode #	Broadcast Date (Filming Date)	Guest(s)	Landmark	Teams		Mission	Results
16	M/01	30 January 2015 (1 December 2014)	Guo Jingfei, Kim Jong-kook, Evonne Hsieh, Xiong Dailin, Yi Yi	(Sanya, Hainan)	Missions; Li Chen Team (Li Chen, Angelababy, Sie Yi-lin, Wong Cho-lam, Chen He); Zhong Team (Kim Jong-kook, Zheng Kai, Guo Jingfei, Wang Baoqiang, Xiong Dailin); Tour Guide (Yi Yi)	Final Task; Killer (Li Chen); Li Chen Team (Wang Baoqiang, Chen He, Sie Yi-lin, Wong Cho-lam, Yi Yi); Zhong Team (Kim Jong-kook, Angelababy, Zheng Kai, Guo Jingfei, Xiong Dailin)	Killer; Defeat the two teams Teams; Report the Killer	Li Chen Team and Zhong Team Win; Receives a trophy and the two teams split the bonus ¥888,888.

== Guests ==
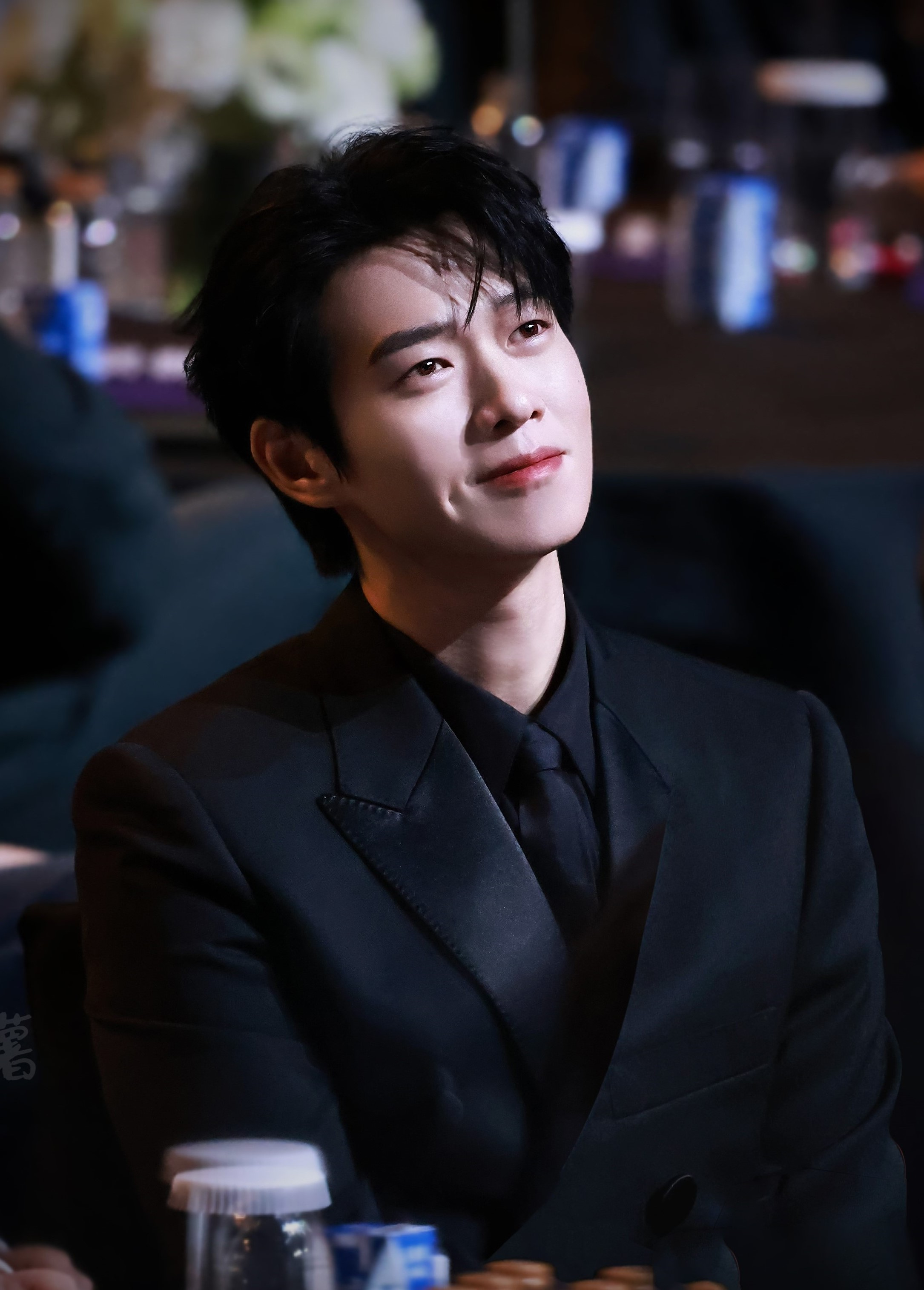
Wei Daxun has taken part in the most episodes of any guest.

Many guests have taken part in Keep Running. The following is a compilation of guests and the number of times they have been on the show. With regards to guest-turned-members (Zhu Yawen, Sha Yi, Bai Lu, Zhou Shen, Fan Chengcheng, Meng Ziyi, Li Yunrui) or former members of the show (Wang Baoqiang, Guo Qilin, Wong Cho-lam), only the times they were a guest are counted. The guests are sorted based on the first episode that they took part in.

Guest	Episode(s)	Number of episodes	Number of appearances
Ma Su	1/01, 3/02	2	2
Shawn Dou	1/01	1	1
Kim Jong-kook (Running Man)	1/01, (Note: In season 1 episode 1, Kim Jong-kook took part in only the final game.) 1/05, Movie, 4/05	4	4
Gülnezer Bextiyar	1/02	1	1
Tang Yixin	1/02, 5/03-5/04	3	2
Zhang Lanxin	1/02, 3/11	2	2
Sie Yi-lin	1/02, 1/09, Movie, 12/07, TATHRS/01-TATHRS/02, 13/11	7	6
Lin Gengxin	1/03-1/05, 2/04, 4/03	5	3
Eddy Ou	1/03-1/04, 2/03	3	2
Wang Likun	1/03-1/04	2	1
Yoo Jae-suk (Running Man)	1/05, 4/05	2	2
Jee Seok-jin (Running Man)	1/05, 4/05	2	2
Gary (Running Man)	1/05, 4/05	2	2
Haha (Running Man)	1/05, 4/05	2	2
Song Ji-hyo (Running Man)	1/05, 4/05	2	2
Lee Kwang-soo (Running Man)	1/05, 4/05	2	2
Hu Haiquan (Yu Quan)	1/06-1/07, 1/14, 1/SP	4	3
Yi Yi	1/06-1/07, 1/SP, Movie, 3/03	5	4
Yu Zhen	1/08	1	1
Guan Zhe	1/08	1	1
Antony Kuo (2moro)	1/08	1	1
Angus Kuo (2moro)	1/08	1	1
Lynn Hung	1/09, Movie, 3/11	3	3
Shen Ling	1/09	1	1
Guo Jingfei	1/10, Movie, 5/09	3	3
Zhang Xinyi	1/10	1	1
Yuan Hong	1/10	1	1
JJ Lin	1/11, 1/SP, 5/02	3	3
Emma Wu	1/11	1	1
Blackie Chen	1/12, 4/01, 4/12	3	3
Zhao Liying	1/12	1	1
Sun Yang	1/12	1	1
Chen Yufan (Yu Quan)	1/14, 1/SP	2	2
Bai Baihe	1/14, 2/10	2	2
Show Lo	1/SP	1	1
Cyndi Wang	1/SP	1	1
G-Dragon (BigBang)	1/SP	1	1
Chen Huan	1/SP	1	1
Fan Bingbing	2/01	1	1
Han Geng	2/01, 11/00-11/01	3	2
Huang Xiaoming	2/02	1	1
Song Jia	2/03, 3/02	2	2
Lay Zhang (Exo)	2/04	1	1
Ye Zuxin	2/04	1	1
Aarif Rahman	2/04	1	1
Jiang Jinfu	2/04	1	1
Nicky Wu	2/05	1	1
Joe Chen	2/05, 3/02, 12/11	3	3
Du Chun	2/05	1	1
Yao Chen	2/06	1	1
Jam Hsiao	2/06, 7/08, 9/11	3	3
Shin	2/06, 10/05-10/06	3	2
Jike Junyi	2/06, 9/01, 11/03	3	3
Da Peng	2/06	1	1
Liu Tao	2/07, 5/07, 12/00-12/01	4	3
Ada Choi	2/09	1	1
Huo Siyan	2/09	1	1
Rain Lee	2/09	1	1
Jiang Xin	2/09	1	1
Jiang Yiyan	2/09	1	1
Wallace Chung	2/10	1	1
Jing Boran	2/10, 7/12	2	2
Tiffany Tang	2/11	1	1
Liu Yan	2/11, 3/06-3/07, 8/08	4	3
Amber Kuo	3/02	1	1
Zhang Huiwen	3/02	1	1
Elva Hsiao	3/03	1	1
Xiao Yang (Chopstick Brothers)	3/03	1	1
Wang Taili (Chopstick Brothers)	3/03	1	1
Wu Mochou	3/03	1	1
Xie Na	3/04	1	1
Huang Bo	3/05	1	1
Ruby Lin	3/05	1	1
Xia Yu	3/05	1	1
Feng Shaofeng	3/06-3/07	2	1
Ella Chen	3/06-3/07, 4/03	3	2
Sun Li	3/08	1	1
Yang Mi	3/09, 6/08	2	2
Wang Baoqiang (Note: Wang Baoqiang was a cast member of season 1.)	3/10	1	1
Kuo Bea-ting	3/11	1	1
Leanne Li	3/11	1	1
Sui He	3/11, 4/02, 8/04	3	3
Jia Ling	4/02, 5/05-5/06	3	2
Lin Yun	4/02, 10/01	2	2
Ma Sichun	4/02	1	1
Janine Chang	4/02	1	1
Ivy Chen	4/04	1	1
Zhang Tian'ai	4/04, 5/12, 8/04	3	3
Jason Zhang	4/06, 6/11	2	2
Rain	4/06	1	1
Tan Weiwei	4/06	1	1
Song Joong-ki	4/07	1	1
Zhang Yuqi	4/07, 13/02	2	2
Alec Su	4/08	1	1
Zhang Hanyu	4/08	1	1
Na Ying	4/09	1	1
Song Xiaobao	4/09, 6/10, 8/07	3	3
Yang Kun	4/10	1	1
Yangwei Linghua (Phoenix Legend)	4/10	1	1
Zeng Yi (Phoenix Legend)	4/10	1	1
Liu Wei	4/10	1	1
Jimmy Lin	4/11	1	1
Jiang Shuying	4/11	1	1
Yue Yunpeng	4/12	1	1
Jacky Heung	4/12	1	1
Qiao Shan	4/12, 12/04	2	2
Zhang Jingchu	4/12	1	1
Wang Ziwen	4/12	1	1
Hua Chenyu	4/12	1	1
Carina Lau	5/01	1	1
Yuan Shanshan	5/01	1	1
Bosco Wong	5/01	1	1
Guan Xiaotong	5/01, 8/01, 11/03	3	3
Wei Daxun	5/01, 6/12, YR2/05, 10/09-10/10, LBaBL/01, LBaBL/05, 11/09-11/10, NS/04-NS/07, 12/06-12/08, 12/12, 14/03	18	11
William Chan	5/02	1	1
Li Qin	5/03-5/04, 8/06, 9/08	4	3
Charlene Choi	5/03-5/04, 13/01-13/01 pt.2	4	2
Lin Chi-ling	5/03-5/04	2	1
Joey Yung	5/03-5/04, YR1/06, 10/02, 12/08	5	4
Jing Tian	5/05-5/06	2	1
Jackson Wang	5/06, 7/06-7/07, 8/06, 9/10-9/11	6	4
Ma Dong	5/07	1	1
"Ethan" Ruan Jingtian	5/09	1	1
Karena Lam	5/09	1	1
Li Xian	5/10	1	1
"Ariel" Lin Yichen	5/10, 12/06	2	2
"Allen" Ren Jialun	5/10	1	1
Zhang Kaili	5/10	1	1
Yang Xuwen	5/11	1	1
Zhu Yawen (Note: Zhu Yawen was a cast member of season 7.)	5/11	1	1
Cherrie Ying	5/12	1	1
Wang Leehom	5/12	1	1
Elvis Han	5/12, 8/06	2	2
Wu Xiubo	6/02-6/03	2	1
Hannah Quinlivan	6/02-6/03	2	1
Song Zu'er	6/02-6/03, 8/09, YR1/03-YR1/04, 9/12	6	4
Zhong Chuxi	6/02-6/03	2	1
Selina Jen	6/02-6/03	2	1
Lan Yingying	6/02-6/03	2	1
He Yujun	6/04-6/05	2	1
Hui Ruoqi	6/04-6/05	2	1
Wu Dajing	6/04-6/05, 11/00-11/01	4	2
Su Bingtian	6/04-6/05, 12/12	3	2
Zhang Guowei	6/04-6/05	2	1
Xu Yaping	6/04-6/05	2	1
Sha Yi (Note: Sha Yi has been a cast member since season 8.)	6/06, 7/08-7/09	3	2
Wang Luodan	6/07	1	1
Ouyang Nana	6/07, 8/12	2	2
Fan Chengcheng (Note: Fan Chengcheng has been a cast member since season 11.)	6/07, 6/11	2	2
Fan Zhiyi	6/08	1	1
Li Yi	6/08	1	1
Du Jiang	6/08	1	1
Zhang Yunlong	6/08	1	1
Li Jiayue	6/08	1	1
Luís Figo	6/08	1	1
Zhao Yixiong	6/08	1	1
Deng Jiajia	6/09	1	1
Sun Yizhou	6/09, 12/03	2	2
Li Jinming	6/09	1	1
Li Jiahang	6/09	1	1
Lou Yixiao	6/09	1	1
Angela Zhang	6/10, 9/04, 13/01-13/01 pt.2	4	3
Han Xue	6/10	1	1
Jane Zhang	6/11, 13/09	2	2
Darren Wang	6/11	1	1
Chen Linong (Nine Percent)	6/11, 7/12, 8/11, 9/13, 14/06	5	5
Justin Huang (Nine Percent)	6/11, 8/01-8/02	3	2
Lin Yanjun (Nine Percent)	6/11	1	1
Zhu Zhengting (Nine Percent)	6/11	1	1
Wang Ziyi (Nine Percent)	6/11	1	1
Xiao Gui (Nine Percent)	6/11, 13/09	2	2
You Zhangjing (Nine Percent)	6/11	1	1
Bai Yu	7/01, 8/11	2	2
Wu Chun	7/02	1	1
Yang Di	7/03, 7/07, 8/02, 10/08, LBaBL/06, 14/09	6	6
Nie Yuan	7/04, 8/06, 10/09, 11/05	4	4
Charmaine Sheh	7/05	1	1
Wu Jinyan	7/05, 8/07	2	2
Jenny Zhang	7/05	1	1
Darren Chen	7/06	1	1
Xu Kai	7/06, 9/10	2	2
Fu Yuanhui	7/06	1	1
Joe Cheng	7/07	1	1
Guo Ailun	7/08, 13/11	2	2
Wang Zhelin (Note: Only participated in the episode as one of the "Men in Black" (Chinese: 黑衣人; pinyin: Hēi Yī Rén) during the final name-tag ripping game.)	7/08	1	1
Yang Ming	7/08	1	1
Chen Xuedong	7/09, YR1/06	2	2
Peng Xiaoran	7/09	1	1
Su Qing	7/09	1	1
Richie Jen	7/10	1	1
Hu Xia	7/10	1	1
Raymond Lam	7/11	1	1
Shen Jiani	7/12	1	1
Qian Kun (WayV)	7/12	1	1
Xiaoshenyang	7/12	1	1
Zuo Chao	7/12	1	1
Wang Yaoqing	8/03, YR2/05	2	2
Hu Ke	8/03, THR/08 (Phone Call), 14/04	2	2
Cheng Xiao	8/04	1	1
Song Yanfei	8/04, 10/01, 12/11	3	3
Song Yi	8/04	1	1
Zhang Han	8/04	1	1
Zhou Shen (Note: Zhou Shen was a cast member from season 10 until season 13.)	8/05, YR2/05	2	2
Li Ronghao	8/05	1	1
Wang Sulong	8/05, YR1/05-YR1/06	3	2
Jin Jing	8/08, YR1/02, 9/08, 10/07-10/08	5	5
Yan Qing Zi	8/08	1	1
Wu Lei	8/08	1	1
Meng Mei Qi	8/09	1	1
Huang Ling	8/09	1	1
Zhang Da Da	8/09, 10/03, 11/02	3	3
Zeng Shunxi	8/10, 13/08	2	2
He Luo Luo (R1SE)	8/11	1	1
Zhou Zhennan (R1SE)	8/11	1	1
Duan Aojuan	8/11	1	1
Jiang Yiyi	8/11, 11/08	1	1
Wu Xuanyi	8/12, 9/11, 10/05	3	3
Mao Xiaotong	YR1/01, 10/02, 14/05	3	3
G.E.M.	YR1/03-YR1/04, 9/01-9/03	5	2
Victor Ma	YR1/04, 11/02, 13/04	3	3
Bai Lu (Note: Bai Lu has been a cast member since Yellow River season 2.)	YR1/05, 9/01-9/03	4	2
Zhang Jike	YR1/05	1	1
Yan Xujia (R1SE)	YR1/05	1	1
Zhou Jieqiong	YR1/05, 9/09, 14/03	3	3
Yu Yang	YR1/05, 9/04, 9/13, YR2/01-YR2/02, 10/05, 12/07, TATHRS/04-TATHRS/05, 14/05, 14/10	11	9
Meng Ziyi	YR1/06, 9/12, 10/01, 11/08, NS/01-NS/03, TATHRS/03-TATHRS/05	10	6
Qin Hao	9/01-9/03	3	3
Baby Zhang	9/02-9/03	2	2
Meng Jia	9/04, 10/01, 11/05	3	3
Zhou Ye	9/04	1	1
He Hongshan	9/04	1	1
Li Chun	9/04	1	1
Zhang Binbin	9/04, CP/07-CP/08	3	2
Bi Wenjun	9/05	1	1
Chen Feiyu	9/05	1	1
Miao Miao	9/06, 12/03, 14/4	3	3
Cao Bingkun	9/07	1	1
Ayanga	9/07-9/08	2	1
Li Yunrui	9/07, 11/06, TATHRS/03-TATHRS/05	5	3
Guo Qilin (Note: Guo Qilin was a cast member of season 8 and Yellow River season 1.)	9/09	1	1
Dong Sicheng (WayV)	9/10	1	1
Qin Xiaoxian	YR2/03-YR2/04, YR2/05, 10/05-10/06	5	3
Gong Lijiao	YR2/03-YR2/04	1	1
Hu Yanbin	10/01, 10/04	2	2
"James" Li Zhuxian	10/02	1	1
Tang Jiuzhou	10/02, Eco/04-Eco/07, 14/06	6	3
Dylan Wang	10/02-10/03, 11/11-11/12, 12/10, 13/04	6	4
Zhang Bichen	10/03	1	1
Wang Ju	10/04	1	1
Chen Youwei	10/05	1	1
Shan Yichun	10/06	1	1
Shao Bing	10/06	1	1
Jin Chen	10/07-10/08	2	2
Ni Hongjie	10/07, 14/04	2	2
Yuan Yawei	10/07	1	1
Li Dan	10/08	1	1
Curley Gao	10/09, 12/09, 14/10	3	3
Li Wen	10/09	1	1
Lü Xiaojun	10/10	1	1
Xu Mengtao	10/10	1	1
Zhang Changning	10/10	1	1
Gao Tingyu	10/10	1	1
Liu Genghong	10/10	1	1
Lu Keran	10/11	1	1
An Qi	10/11	1	1
Jiang Dunhao	10/12	1	1
Zhao Lusi	10/12	1	1
Zhang Jianing	CP/01	1	1
Sun Yi	CP/02-CP/03	2	1
"Jason" Fu Longfei	CP/03-CP/04	2	1
Chen Zhuoxuan	CP/03-CP/04	2	1
Wu Yi	CP/05	1	1
Liu Xiening	CP/05, 14/11-14/12	3	2
Li Yitong	CP/05	1	1
Bo Pang	CP/06	1	1
Tang Xiaotian	CP/06	1	1
Zhang Ruonan	LBaBL/06, 11/06, 12/05, 13/09, 14/11-14/12	6	5
Shen Yue	CP/07-CP/08	2	1
Qiao Xin	CP/07-CP/08	2	1
Zhang Yuxi	CP/07-CP/08	2	1
Chen Zheyuan	LBaBL/07-LBaBL/08, 11/02, 12/05, 13/12, 14/02	6	5
Zhang Jingyi	11/00-11/01	2	1
Allen Su	11/00-11/01, 12/08	3	2
Zhang Yishan	11/03	1	1
Liu Yu (Into1)	11/04	1	1
Uno Santa (Into1)	11/04	1	1
Rikimaru Chikada (Into1)	11/04	1	1
Mika Hashizume (Into1)	11/04	1	1
Gao Qingchen (Into1)	11/04	1	1
Lin Mo (Into1)	11/04	1	1
Bo Yuan (Into1)	11/04	1	1
Zhang Jiayuan (Into1)	11/04	1	1
Yin Haoyu (Into1)	11/04	1	1
Zhou Keyu (Into1)	11/04, 14/08	2	2
Liu Zhang (Into1)	11/04	1	1
Huang Xiaoyun	11/05	1	1
Hou Minghao	11/06	1	1
Xue Kaiqi	11/06, 14/06	2	2
Huang Yi	11/08	1	1
Zhang Weili	11/08	1	1
Ma Tianyu	11/08	1	1
Zhang Linghe	11/09	1	1
"Patrick" Shih Boyu	11/10	1	1
Sun Zhenni	11/10	1	1
Xu Hongzhi	11/10	1	1
Minnie ((G)I-dle)	11/11	1	1
Yang Yunqing	11/12	1	1
Cai Wenjing	Eco/01-Eco/03	3	1
Huang Xinchun	11/7, Eco/03-Eco/04, 13/11, 14/09-14/10	6	4
Lu Yuxiao	Eco/03-Eco/04	2	1
Fan Shiqi	Eco/03-Eco/04	2	1
Deng Enxi	Eco/04-Eco/07	4	1
Chen Bing	Eco/04-Eco/07	4	1
Jiang Long	NS/04-NS/07, 12/04	5	2
Yang Tian Zhen	12/00-12/01	2	1
Zheng Yecheng	12/02	1	1
Zhang Yi Fan	12/02	1	1
Ao Ruipeng	12/03, 13/06, THR/01-THR/04	6	3
Sun Qian	12/03, 14/03	2	2
GAI	12/03	1	1
Tim Huang	12/06, THR/08 (Phone Call)	2	2
Cai Guo Qing	12/06	1	
Shen Xiao Ting	12/08, TATHRS/01-TATHRS/02	3	2
Zhang Hao	12/09	1	1
Ricky	12/09	1	1
Duan Xiao Wei	12/09	1	1
Cheng Lei	TATHRS/01-TATHRS/02, 13/06, 14/07-14/08	5	3
Zhai Zilu	TATHRS/03-TATHRS/04, 13/06, THR/01-THR/04, 14/05-14/06	9	4
Steve Chou	13/01-13/01 pt.2	2	1
Wang Heye	13/01-13/01 pt.2, THR/08 (Phone Call)	2	1
Wu Xin	13/02	1	1
Zhai Xiaowen	13/02	1	1
Ning Jing	13/04-13/05	2	1
Dai Luwa	13/08	1	1
Wang Churan	13/09, THR/01-THR/04	5	2
Zhang Meng	13/09, 14/06	2	2
Shen Yujie	THR/05-THR/08, 14/04	5	2
Xu Zhisheng	THR/05-THR/08, 14/04	5	2
Ma Jiaqi (TNT)	14/01	1	1
Ding Chengxin (TNT)	14/01	1	1
Song Yaxuan (TNT)	14/01	1	1
Liu Yaowen (TNT)	14/01	1	1
Yan Haoxiang (TNT)	14/01	1	1
He Junlin (TNT)	14/01	1	1
Lars Huang	14/02	1	1
Xu Yiyang	14/03	1	1
Zhou Yiran	14/05	1	1
Zhang Kangle	14/06	1	1
Liu Yuxin	14/07	1	1
Peng Yuchang	14/07	1	1
Zhang Weili	14/08	1	1
Chen Lijun	14/09	1	1
Wang Hongyi	14/09	1	1
Tian Jiarui	14/09	1	1
Lai Weiming	14/10	1	1

== Other activities ==
Date	Location	Event	Attendees
9 November 2014	Hangzhou, Zhejiang (China)	"Running Man" National Press Conference on Zhejiang TV	Deng Chao, Angelababy, Li Chen, Chen He, Zheng Kai, Wang Baoqiang, Wong Cho-lam
31 December 2014	Guangzhou, Guangdong (China)	"Running 2015" New Year's Eve Party on Zhejiang TV	Running Man Members: Deng Chao, Li Chen, Chen He, Zheng Kai, Wong Cho-lam; Running Man Members: Ji Suk-jin, Song Ji-hyo
9 January 2015	Shanghai Exhibition Centre, Shanghai (China)	Lamando's Night	Deng Chao, Angelababy, Li Chen, Chen He, Zheng Kai, Wong Cho-lam
11 April 2015	Guangzhou, Guangdong (China)	"Running Man" Season 2 National Press Conference on Zhejiang TV	Deng Chao, Angelababy, Li Chen, Chen He, Zheng Kai, Bao Bei'er, Wong Cho-lam
30 September 2015	Shenzhen, Guangdong (China)	"Running Man" Season 3 National Press Conference on Zhejiang TV	Deng Chao, Angelababy, Li Chen, Chen He, Zheng Kai, Lu Han, Wong Cho-lam
31 December 2015	Shenzhen, Guangdong (China)	"Running 2016" New Year's Eve Party on Zhejiang TV	Deng Chao, Angelababy, Li Chen, Chen He, Zheng Kai, Lu Han, Wong Cho-lam
31 March 2016	Xiamen, Fujian (China)	"Running Man" Season 4 National Press Conference on Zhejiang TV	Deng Chao, Angelababy, Li Chen, Chen He, Zheng Kai, Lu Han, Wong Cho-lam
30 December 2016	Shenzhen, Guangdong (China)	"Running 2017" New Year's Eve Party on Zhejiang TV	Deng Chao, Angelababy, Li Chen, Chen He, Zheng Kai, Lu Han, Wong Cho-lam
10 April 2017	Yan'an, Shaanxi (China)	"Running Man" Season 6 National Press Conference on Zhejiang TV	Deng Chao, Dilraba Dilmurat, Li Chen, Chen He, Zheng Kai, Lu Han, Wong Cho-lam
30 December 2017	Shenzhen, Guangdong (China)	"Running 2018" New Year's Eve Party on Zhejiang TV	Angelababy, Li Chen, Chen He, Zheng Kai, Dilraba Dilmurat, Wong Cho-lam
30 December 2018	Shenzhen, Guangdong (China)	"Running 2019" New Year's Eve Party on Zhejiang TV	Deng Chao, Angelababy, Li Chen, Chen He, Zheng Kai, Lu Han, Wong Cho-lam
