= Keep Running season 8 =

2020 season of Chinese television series

Keep Running
- Season 8
- Poster for Season 8
- Starring: Li Chen; Angelababy; Zheng Kai; Sha Yi; Cai Xukun; Guo Qilin
- No. of episodes: 12

Release
- Original network: ZRTG: Zhejiang Television
- Original release: 29 May – 14 August 2020

Season chronology
- ← Previous; Season 7 Next → Season 9

This is a list of episodes of the Chinese variety show Keep Running in season 8. The new season welcomed three new members: Sha Yi, Cai Xukun and Guo Qilin. Yuqi and Lucas (who were based in South Korea) were absent due to COVID-19 Pandemic and travel restrictions.

== Episodes ==
List of episodes (episode 88–99)
(Series) Episode #	(Season) Episode #	Broadcast Date	Guest(s)	Landmark	Teams	Mission	Results
88	8/01	May 29, 2020	Guan Xiaotong, Huang Minghao	Hangzhou, Zhejiang	No Teams	Life Archive (Marriage & Life Decisions): Complete tasks based on simulating life milestones to gather "happiness points" for an idealized life record.	Everyone (except Huang Minghao) Wins. Li Chen wins on points, others who picked happiness on the life record also wins. Huang Minghao did not pick happiness on life record.
89	8/02	June 5, 2020	Yang Di, Huang Minghao	Yongjia County, Wenzhou, Zhejiang	No Teams	Idol Image: Each member has a secret mission: get rid of marked weight sandbags in their backpack. Total weight remaining at the end represents the "idol image" weight of Cai Xukun. Every member must complete their secret mission (0jin remains) to win.	Cai Xukun Wins. Cai Xukun's idol image is 30jin; Sha Yi and Yang Di's secret missions incomplete.
90	8/03	June 12, 2020	Hu Ke, Wang Yaoqing	Kaifeng, Henan	Good Guys Team: Guo Qilin (General), Li Chen (Boatman), Sha Yi (Boatman), Cai Xukun (Boatman), Wang Yaoqing (Boatmen-killed) Spy Team: (Zheng Kai, Angelababy, Hu Ke)	Rainbow Bridge Mystery: Members are divided into boatmen and spies. Boatmen must lower the mast to avoid colliding with the bridge. Spies must sabotage the mast to destroy the boat, or locate and assassinate the general. Only game winners may board the ship to verify player identities.	Good Guys Team Wins Good Guys successfully identified each other on the ship, Spy Team failed to locate who is the general.
91	8/04	June 19, 2020	Zhang Han, Song Yanfei, He Sui, Zhang Tianai, Cheng Xiao, Song Yi	Zhengzhou, Henan	Purple Team: (Li Chen, Song Yi); Green Team: (Zheng Kai, Song Yanfei); Pink Team: (Angelababy, Zhang Han); Blue Team: (Sha Yi, Cheng Xiao); Orange Team: (Guo Qilin, Zhang Tianai); White Team: (Cai Xukun, He Sui)	Run, Fashion Week! : Members play various fashion-related games throughout the day to earn points to determine which fashion house they can pick outfits from. The best-dressed duo according to professional judges is the winner and gets a photoshoot the next day.	Orange Team Wins Guo Qilin & Zhang Tianai is picked as the best-dressed fashion duo.
92	8/05	June 26, 2020	Li Ronghao, Zhou Shen, Silence Wang	Guilin, Guangxi	Blue Team: (Li Chen, Li Ronghao, Zhou Shen) Pink Team: (Angelababy, Sha Yi, Silence Wang) White Team: (Zheng Kai, Guo Qilin, Cai Xukun)	Music Album Contest: Compete across different music activities in Guilin to earn or sabotage album sales of members.	Sha Yi Wins Sha Yi claims first place on album sales leaderboard with 860,100. Li Ronghao (700,000) and Li Chen (620,000) were 2nd/3rd respectively.
93	8/06	July 3, 2020	Li Qin, Jackson Wang, Nie Yuan, Elvis Han	Guilin, Guangxi	Orange Team: (Sha Yi, Cai Xukun, Guo Qilin, Nie Yuan, Li Qin, Angelababy, Zheng Kai) White Team: (Li Chen, Jackson Wang, Han Dongjun) (Note: These are final teams. Initial Teams changed as people's beliefs about who the truth is changed. Orange initially: Sha Yi, Cai Xukun, Guo Qilin, Nie Yuan, Li Qin. White initially: Li Chen, Angelababy, Zheng Kai, Jackson Wang, Han Dongjun.)	Truth of Head Slap Incident: Gather evidence through each game like the famous "black suit men" corridor chase to debate to an audience and verify who is telling the truth of the incident.	White Team Wins: Audience voting was White: 66, Orange: 34. More of the audience believed Li Chen, which was not the truth.
94	8/07	July 10, 2020	Song Xiaobao, Wu Jinyan	Hangzhou, Zhejiang	No Teams	Circus Time Loop Mystery: Break out of a continuous time-loop setup by completing physical puzzles before a giant boulder strikes the camp.	Everyone Wins. The cast successfully unlocked the time anchor mechanics together on the final synchronized loop attempt.
95	8/08	July 17, 2020	Wu Lei, Liu Yan, Kan Qingzi, Jin Jing	Hangzhou, Zhejiang	No Teams	Film Audition Race: Pass many dramatic and physical screen tests to earn the coveted "Gold Popcorn" trophy.	Cai Xukun Wins. Cai Xukun secures the highest cumulative technical score from the directors panel during the final cut scene.
96	8/09	July 24, 2020	Meng Meiqi, Song Zu'er, Zhang Dada, Huang Ling	Changchun, Jilin	VIP Member Team: (Li Chen, Angelababy, Zheng Kai, Sha Yi, Song Zuer, Huang Ling, Zhang Dada) Fake Member Team: (Guo Qilin, Cai Xukun, Meng Meiqi) (Note: These are identity teams. Game Teams were Blue Team and Red Team. Blue: Li Chen, Sha Yi, Guo Qilin, Meng Meiqi, Song Zuer. Red: Angelababy, Zheng Kai, Cai Xukun, Huang Ling, Zhang Dada)	Gathering at the Equestrian Club: Ten people arrived, but only seven invitations were sent. Fake members must conceal their identities while trying to guess the secret member code.	Fake Member Team Wins. Li Chen and Meng Meiqi were voted out during last votes, Cai Xukun remained as winning Fake Member.
97	8/10	July 31, 2020	Ling Xiaosu, Zeng Shunxi, Jeffrey Tung	Changchun, Jilin	Brown Team: (Li Chen, Guo Qilin) Green Team: (Zheng Kai, Zeng Shunxi) Blue Team: (Sha Yi, Ling Xiaosu) Yellow Team: (Cai Xukun, Jeffrey Tung)	Most Charming Man Battle: Angelababy is the judge. She draws a player's phone randomly each round to decide who pays for the game. During the final name-tag battle, she can use special tricks to eliminate players without ripping nametags.	Angelababy Wins. Angelababy receives the gold prize, gives Zheng Kai the title of Most Charming Man.
98	8/11	August 7, 2020	Bai Yu, Duan Aojuan, Chen Linong, He Luoluo, Jiang Yiyi, Zhou Zhennan	Qingdao, Shandong	Blue Team: (Li Chen, Angelababy, Sha Yi, Cai Xukun, Guo Qilin, Bai Yu) Yellow Team: (Zheng Kai, He Luoluo, Jiang Yiyi, Chen Linong, Zhou Zhennan, Duan Aojuan)	Battle of the Century (100th Episode Special): Running Man team faces off against a post-00s team who steals their name tags. Members must win consecutive games for a chance to draw their tag back. Only members who reclaim their tag can participate in the final elimination round.	Yellow Team Wins. Zheng Kai receives the perfect attendance award and a pure gold name tag. All other members receive a 100th EP pure gold commemorative medal, with Team Yellow's being bigger than Team Blue's.
99	8/12	August 14, 2020	Ouyang Nana, Wu Xuanyi	Qingdao, Shandong	Everyone is a Sailor	S8 Finale - Sailors and Pirates: Unmask the two pirates who are infiltrating the eight sailors on the boat.	Everyone Wins. The members correctly identified there are no pirates, each receives a pure gold anchor charm necklace.
