= Keep Running: The Heavenly Road =

2025 special season of the Chinese television series

- Poster for The Heavenly Road
- Starring: Cast members: Li Chen; Zheng Kai; Sha Yi; Bai Lu; Fan Chengcheng; Yuqi; Zhang Zhenyuan
- No. of episodes: 8

Release
- Original network: ZRTG: Zhejiang Television
- Original release: November 22, 2025 – January 10, 2026

Season chronology
- ← Previous; Season 13 Next → Season 14

This is a list of episodes of the Chinese variety show Keep Running in the special spin-off season, The Heavenly Road. The spin-off season welcomed back the core cast members while adapting to a brand new alpine self-drive format along China National Highway 318 without its usual Running Friends due to scheduling conflicts.

== Cast ==
Cast members	Episode							
Cast members	1	2	3	4	5	6	7	8
Li Chen								
Zheng Kai								
Sha Yi								
Bai Lu								
Fan Chengcheng								
Yuqi								
Zhang Zhenyuan								

== Episodes ==
List of episodes (episodes 196-203)
(Series) Episode #	(Season) Episode #	Broadcast Date	Guest(s)	Landmark	Teams	Mission	Results
196	THR/01	22 November 2025	Ao Ruipeng, Wang Churan, Zhai Zilu	Nyingchi, Tibet, China		Road Trip along Gangga-Paizhen Highway, stopped at Nyang and Yarlung Tsangpo rivers, and visited Namcha Barwa mountain.	
197	THR/02	29 November 2025	Ao Ruipeng, Wang Churan, Zhai Zilu	Lunang, Nyingchi Tongmai Special Bridge Bomê County, Tibet, China		Heading up to 4700+ meters in the mountains from Nyingchi to Bomê by self-driving in two vehicles. All costs are paid from members' pockets via a knife minigame currency. Five members with knife currency remaining receives a set of travel souvenirs.	
198	THR/03	6 December 2025	Ao Ruipeng, Wang Churan, Zhai Zilu	Tramog, Bomê County Mêdog Town, Mêdog County, Tibet, China		Travel along the Zhamu-Motuo Highway to Medog! The team travels through Galongla Mountain (24K), Qingshui Waterfall (55K), Gongri Village (80K), and Madi Village (130K) with minigame winners having a chance to shoot a video with each highway marker.	
199	THR/04	13 December 2025	Ao Ruipeng, Wang Churan, Zhai Zilu	Mêdog Town, Mêdog County, Tibet, China		A day in Medog Town to learn its history, culture, and trivia for a final test to give the final prize of a handmade Motuo stone pot and the title of "Secret Realm Smartie."	
200	THR/05	20 December 2025	Shen Yujie, Xu Zhisheng	Kashgar, Xinjiang, China		A day of touring Kashgar Old City with a shop-till-you-drop adventure and minigames for extra benefits.	
201	THR/06	27 December 2025	Shen Yujie, Xu Zhisheng	Kizilsu Kyrgyz Autonomous Prefecture Baisha Lake Karakul (Xinjiang) Muztagh Ata		A road trip along China National Highway 314 west, crossing Kunlun Mountains into the Pamir Plateau to spend the evening in the beautiful pink sunset and stargazing at night.	
202	THR/07	3 January 2026	Li Yunrui, Shen Yujie, Xu Zhisheng	Tashkurgan, Panlong Ancient Road		Battle for the "Elite Eagle" title is about to begin! Who will claim the ultimate honor?	
203	THR/08	10 January 2026	Li Yunrui, Shen Yujie, Xu Zhisheng	Tashkurgan, Khunjerab Pass		Flag-raising ceremony at the China-Pakistan border at Khunjerab Pass in the morning, Tashkurgan Stone City in the evening to close out the finale.	
