= Keep Running season 13 =

2025 season of Chinese television series

Keep Running
- Season 13
- Poster for Season 13
- Starring: Cast members: Li Chen; Zheng Kai; Sha Yi; Bai Lu; Zhou Shen; Fan Chengcheng; Yuqi; Zhang Zhenyuan; Running Friends: Meng Ziyi; Li Yunrui
- No. of episodes: 13

Release
- Original network: ZRTG: Zhejiang Television
- Original release: April 25 – July 18, 2025

Season chronology
- ← Previous; The Ancient Tea Horse Road Next → Heavenly Road

This is a list of episodes of the Chinese variety show Keep Running in season 13. The new season welcomed: Meng Ziyi and Li Yunrui as Running Friends.

== Episodes ==
List of episodes (episodes 183-195)
(Series) Episode #	(Season) Episode #	Broadcast Date	Guest(s)	Landmark	Teams	Mission	Results
183	13/01 (Part 1) (Note: Episode 1 was officially split and broadcast across two consecutive weeks as Part 1 and Part 2 due to extensive staging constraints.)	25 April 2025	Steve Chou, Angela Chang, Charlene Choi, Wang Heye	Wuhan, Hebei	Pink Team: (Sha Yi, Yuqi, Zhang Zhenyuan, Charlene Choi) Black Team: (Zheng Kai, Fan Chengcheng, Angela Zhang, Wang Heye) Blue Team: (Li Chen, Zhou Shen, Meng Ziyi, Steve Chou)	Elephant Time Machine: Navigate 千禧风格 (Y2K) tasks like the carousel definition game to extract game tokens.	Individual conditions satisfied. Cast units safely pass the opening session checks.
184	13/01 (Part 2)	2 May 2025	Steve Chou, Angela Chang, Charlene Choi, Wang Heye	Wuhan, Hebei	Pink Team: (Sha Yi, Yuqi, Zhang Zhenyuan, Charlene Choi) Black Team: (Zheng Kai, Fan Chengcheng, Angela Zhang, Wang Heye) Blue Team: (Li Chen, Zhou Shen, Meng Ziyi, Steve Chou)	Team relay of various minigame challenges. One team gets eliminated per round if their timer expires.	Pink Team WINS. Pink Team earns the most Y2K game tokens.
185	13/02	9 May 2025	Zhang Yuqi, Wu Xin & Zhai Xiaowen	Wuhan, Hebei	"大牛马" (Ox-Horse) Team: (Yuqi, Wu Xin, Zheng Kai, Zhang Zhenyuan, Meng Ziyi, Zhang Yuqi) "快乐小狗" (Happy Puppy) Team: (Sha Yi, Li Chen, Fan Chengcheng, Zhou Shen, and Zhai Xiaowen)	Complete the workspace "去除班味" (Remove Work Stress) social strategy game. Factions must spread alignment markers without alerting the target "Happy Puppy".	The "大牛马" Team Wins. Song Yuqi effectively coordinates the coalition to achieve an overwhelming voting block victory.
186	13/03	16 May 2025	No guests	Wuhan, Hebei	No predefined teams. (10-stage relay allocation matrix)	Execute the demanding 13-kilometer milestone marathon接力赛 challenge across the Wuhan Expo Park parameters.	Brothers Team Wins. Sha Yi finishes the final leg under team encouragement. Li Yunrui completes a dual-leg 4000-meter runtime run.
187	13/04	23 May 2025	Ning Jing, Wang Hedi & Ma Boqian	Xi'an, Shaanxi	Black Team: (Li Chen, Bai Lu, Zhou Shen, Zhang Zhenyuan, Ning Jing, Wang Hedi) White Team: (Zheng Kai, Sha Yi, Fan Chengcheng, Song Yuqi, Meng Ziyi, Ma Boqian)	Complete multiple physical tasks at the Xi'an Science and Technology Museum while calculating an absolute time metric of 58 minutes 23 seconds.	White Team WINS White team chose to leave one person in place to keep the timer while the others completed the challenge separately.
188	13/05	30 May 2025	Ning Jing	Xi'an, Shaanxi	No starting teams. (Secret Lychee Thief Matrix)	Isolate the hidden "荔枝大盗" (Lychee Thieves) hidden within the team ranks via localized identity verification checking zones at Daming Palace.	Good Citizens Win. Zheng Kai is successfully identified as the primary culprit via a decisive 7-vote majority matrix check.
189	13/06	June 6, 2025	Cheng Lei, Ao Ruipeng, Zhai Zilu	Xi'an, Shaanxi	Shangguan Family: Li Chen, Bai Lu, Ao Ruipeng, Zhai Zilu Nangong Family: Zheng Kai, Yuqi, Meng Ziyi, Sha Yi, Fan Chengcheng Undercover Partners: Zhang Zhenyuan, Cheng Lei	It is short drama filming day! Navigate secret identities through flying water chair activities and eliminate opposing family factions in a name-tag ripping finale.	Shangguan Family WINS. Ao Ruipeng is the last name-tag standing in the finale and earns their family the victory.
190	13/07	13 June 2025	No guests	Jurong, Jiangsu	No teams. (Individual PK)	Earn the highest Spiritual Aura Level through various literature and spiritual activities.	Bai Lu Win. Bai Lu earns the highest Spiritual Aura Level with 17.
191	13/08	20 June 2025	Zeng Shunxi, Dai Luwa	Changzhou, Jiangsu	Yellow Team: Li Chen, Zheng Kai, Zhou Shen, Fan Chengcheng, Dai Luwa Blue Team: Sha Yi, Bai Lu, Zhang Zhenyuan, Li Yunrui, Zeng Shunxi (Note: Note: Bai Lu's nametag was changed to Bai Mengyan at beginning of the episode due to filming in her hometown and for the purpose of the game.)	The Missing TA: Find the missing character (她) through game clues and obtain strokes of member names in the name-tag ripping finale.	Yellow Team WINS Zheng Kai completes the final poem with the missing character TA in the correct missing positions.
192	13/09	27 June 2025	Zhang Meng, Jane Zhang, Song Yanfei, Zhang Ruonan, Wang Churan, Wang Linkai	Ningbo, Zhejiang	Green Team: Li Chen, Zhang Meng Black Team: Zheng Kai, Song Yanfei Light Blue Team: Sha Yi, Wang Churan Yellow Team: Bai Lu, Wang Linkai Red Team: Zhou Shen, Jane Zhang Dark Blue Team: Fan Chengcheng, Zhang Ruonan White Team: Zhang Zhenyuan, Li Yunrui	Red Beauty Contest: There are two "Red Beauty" cards, two "Black Rose" cards, and the rest "Wave" cards. The first three groups to collect two "Red Beauty" cards wins, while the groups holding any "Black Rose" card faces a final whipped cream cannon punishment. Only by passing a challenge can they earn the chance to exchange cards.	Light Blue Team, Dark Blue Team, White Team WINS These three teams successfully obtain the "Red Beauty" cards through the final name-tag ripping finale at KR's new amusement park.
193	13/10	4 July 2025	No guests	Taizhou, Zhejiang	Regular Member: Li Chen Glutton Team: Zheng Kai, Sha Yi, Bai Lu, Zhou Shen, Fan Chengcheng, Zhang Zhenyuan, Li Yunrui	The cast eat a yellow croaker behind Li Chen's back at the team lunch and only leave fish bones. They must solve the mystery of the crime with Li Chen through games to uncover clues about the identities of the ordinary members and the "glutton." Will they be able to conceal their identities?	Glutton Team WINS; Through final voting, the glutton team was not voted out and wins.
194	13/11	11 July 2025	Xie Yilin, Guo Ailun, Huang Xinchun	Macau, China	White Team: Li Chen, Bai Lu, Fan Chengcheng, Guo Ailun Yellow Team: Sha Yi, Yuqi, Zhang Zhenyuan, Huang Xichun Green Team: Zheng Kai, Zhou Shen, Li Yunrui, Xie Yilin	Drifting Duck Competition: Acquire the most amount of mini rubber ducks by winning games throughout the day in Macau to increase the chances of winning the final rubber duck drift race. Whichever color rubber duck crosses the finish first is the team that wins.	Yellow Team: WINS Yellow rubber duck barely inches forward at finish line over two green rubber ducks to win.
195	13/12	18 July 2025	Chen Zheyuan	Macau, China	Blue Team: Li Chen, Bai Lu, Fan Chengcheng/Fan PD, Zhang Zhenyuan, Li Yunrui Yellow Team: Zheng Kai, Sha Yi, Zhou Shen, Song Yuqi, Chen Zheyuan	Who is the Best PD? The Brothers team wins voting tickets through games. Two PDs also participate to win more diamonds in negotiations. The PD with the most votes wins, along with the two members holding the most winning PD diamonds.	Fan Chengcheng, Bai Lu, Zhang Zhenyuan WINS Fan PD has most votes through tickets. Bai Lu and Zhang Zhenyuan are the two members holding most diamonds on his team.
