= Keep Running season 7 =

2019 season of Chinese television series

Keep Running
- Season 7
- Poster for Season 7
- No. of episodes: 12

Release
- Original network: ZRTG: Zhejiang Television
- Original release: April 26 – July 12, 2019

Season chronology
- ← Previous; Season 6 Next → Season 8

This is a list of episodes of the Chinese variety show Keep Running in season 7. The show airs on ZRTG: Zhejiang Television. The new season welcomed 4 new members: Zhu Yawen, Wang Yanlin, Lucas Wong and Song Yuqi.

== Episodes ==
List of episodes (episode 76–87)
(Series) Episode #	(Season) Episode #	Broadcast Date	Guest(s)	Landmark	Teams		Mission	Results
76	7/01 (Note: The episode was split into two parts, with the 8v20 quiz aired on Saturday, 27 April.)	April 26, 2019	Bai Yu	Hangzhou, Zhejiang	No Teams		Complete the mission to learn more about the environment and garbage for the final mission.	Everyone Wins. They won 900 million worth of insurance for the environmental workers and cleaners in Hangzhou.
77	7/02	May 3, 2019	Wu Chun	Anshan, Liaoning	Dad Team: (Angelababy, Zhu Yawen, Wu Chun, Zheng Kai); Son Team: (Li Chen, Lucas, Song Yuqi, Wang Yanlin)		Dad vs Son battle: Collect the most photographs of Ansteel Group about their 70 years of history	Son Team Wins. Son Team get to present the special gift to Ansteel Group.
78	7/03	May 10, 2019	Yang Di	Anshan, Liaoning	No Teams		Overnight challenge: Collect the most nametags to have a higher chance of winning. Winner is determined by the box with nametags the hamster goes into	Wang Yanlin and Yang Di Wins.
79	7/04	May 17, 2019	Nie Yuan	Shunde District, Foshan, Guangdong	No Teams		Kungfu special: Complete missions relating to Kungfu, and win the final nametag elimination battle	Lucas Wins. Lucas won Anmuxi's gift box, consisting of two lion dance head.
80	7/05	May 24, 2019	Charmaine Sheh; Wu Jinyan; Jenny Zhang	Nanhai District, Foshan, Guangdong	Green Team: (Lucas Wong, Angelababy) Blue Team: (Zhu Yawen, Jenny Zhang) Orange Team: (Wang Yanlin, Song Yuqi); Pink Team: (Zheng Kai, Wu Jinyan) Brown Team: (Li Chen, Charmaine Sheh)	Final Mission: Civilians: (Zhu Yawen, Angelababy, Charmaine Sheh); Killers: (Li Chen, Zheng Kai, Wang Yanlin, Lucas Wong, Song Yuqi, Wu Jinyan, Jenny Zhang)	Complete missions to earn clues about the people with special identity. Identify and eliminate the killers in the final mission	Killer Wins. Killer Team each received a box of gold. Civilian Team also received a box of gold for their efforts.
81	7/06 (Note: Wang Yanlin did not participate in this week's filming due to scheduling issues.)	May 31, 2019	Jackson Wang; Darren Chen; Xu Kai; Fu Yuanhui	Jiangbei District, Ningbo, Zhejiang	Red Team: (Lucas Wong, Jackson Wang); Pink Team: (Li Chen, Song Yuqi); Grey Team: (Zhu Yawen, Darren Chen); Blue Team: (Zheng Kai, Fu Yuanhui); White Team: (Angelababy, Xu Kai)		Running Man Sports Day: Defeat the other teams	Pink Team Wins. Li Chen and Song Yuqi each received a gold medal. Other teams also received a box of gold each as a souvenir.
82	7/07	June 7, 2019	Jackson Wang; Joe Cheng; Yang Di	Ningbo, Zhejiang	Chairman: (Yang Di); White Team: (Li Chen, Angelababy, Lucas, Jackson Wang); Blue Team: (Song Yuqi, Zheng Kai, Zhu Yawen, Joe Chen)		Complete missions to earn budget for each business groups	White Team Wins. White Team can use the budget earned from missions to exchange for gifts.
83	7/08 (Note: Special appearances by CBA players Wang Zhelin and Yang Ming in the final mission.)	June 14, 2019	Sha Yi; Jam Hsiao; Guo Ailun	Daqing, Heilongjiang	No Teams	Final Mission: Running Man Team: (Li Chen, Zheng Kai, Angelababy, Zhu Yawen, Lucas, Song Yuqi); Spy: (Jam Hsiao, Sha Yi, Guo Ailun, Wang Zhelin, Yang Ming)	Complete missions to allow Li Chen to watch the show's premier together Final Mission: Collect members' and guests' posters for the show's premier while avoiding spies	No one Wins. The game ended with a tie and everyone got to watch the premier.
84	7/09	June 21, 2019	Sha Yi; Chen Xuedong; Peng Xiaoran; Su Qing	Daqing, Heilongjiang	Alien Team: (Zhu Yawen, Lucas, Song Yuqi, Chen Xuedong); Human Team: (Li Chen, Zheng Kai, Angelababy, Sha Yi, Peng Xiaoran, Su Qing)		Correctly identify the aliens and avoid partnering with them	Angelababy, Zheng Kai, Zhu Yawen, Song Yuqi, Sha Yi, Su Qing Wins. They each received a gift set.
85	7/10 (Note: Special host appearance by Yi Yi.)	June 28, 2019	Richie Jen; Hu Xia	Jianggan District, Hangzhou, Zhejiang	Red Team: (Li Chen, Zhu Yawen, Richie Jen); Blue Team: (Zheng Kai, Lucas, Song Yuqi); White Team: (Angelababy, Wang Yanlin, Hu Xia)		Running Man Singing Festival: Win the singing competition and defeat the other teams	White Team Wins. White Team each received a golden necklace.
86	7/11 (Note: Special appearance by Zhang Guoli.)	July 5, 2019	Raymond Lam	Macau	Cat Team: (Zheng Kai, Wang Yanlin, Raymond Lam); Rat Team: (Li Chen, Angelababy[king], Zhu Yawen, Lucas, Song Yuqi)		Cat team have to correctly identify the hidden cat hiding among the rat team, and also eliminate the rat king	Rat Team Wins. Rat Team each received a golden necklace.
87	7/12	July 12, 2019	Jing Boran; Yan An (Pentagon); Qian Kun (WayV); Xiaoshenyang; Shen Jiani; Zuo Chao; Chen Linong	Macau	Orange Team: (Li Chen, Xiaoshenyang); Blue Team: (Angelababy, Jing Boran); Black Team: (Zheng Kai, Zuo Chao); Green Team: (Zhu Yawen, Shen Jiani); Red Team: (Wang Yanlin, Chen Linong); Purple Team: (Lucas, Qian Kun); Yellow Team: (Song Yuqi, Yan An)		Complete missions to win the chance to swap the suitcase in order to win the suitcase with the heaviest gold	Black Team Wins. Black Team got to keep the gold.
