= Keep Running season 9 =

2021 season of Chinese television series

Keep Running
- Season 9
- Poster for Season 9
- Starring: Li Chen; Angelababy; Zheng Kai; Sha Yi; Cai Xukun; Lucas; Yuqi
- No. of episodes: 13

Release
- Original network: ZRTG: Zhejiang Television
- Original release: April 23 – July 16, 2021

Season chronology
- ← Previous; Season 8 Next → Season 10

This is a list of episodes of the Chinese variety show Keep Running in season 9. The show airs on Zhejiang Television. The season features the return of cast members Lucas and Yuqi, alongside the other cast members from the previous season.

== List of episodes ==
(Series) Episode #	(Season) Episode #	Broadcast Date	Guest(s)	Theme / Result
106	09/01	April 23, 2021	Bai Lu, Qin Hao, Jike Junyi, G.E.M. (Note: Song Yuqi was absent from episodes 1 through 4 due to mandatory COVID-19 quarantine requirements upon entering China. They officially rejoined the cast starting from episode 5.)	Theme: The "Workplace Anxiety" CEO Competition; Result: The employees defeat the bosses. The team wins overtime exemptions and bonuses.
107	09/02	April 30, 2021	Bai Lu, Qin Hao, Zhang Hanyun, Jike Junyi, G.E.M.	Theme: The "Mystery of the Rare Book" Protection Mission; Result: The Family of Guardians successfully protects the national treasure and identifies the "W" conspirators.
108	09/03	May 7, 2021	Bai Lu, Qin Hao, Zhang Hanyun, G.E.M.	Theme: Pearl Treasure Hunt in Zhuhai; Result: The civilian team wins; spies fail to sabotage the mission.
109	09/04	May 14, 2021	Zhou Ye, Vin Zhang, He Hongshan, Li Chun, Angela Chang, Meng Jia, Yu Yang	Theme: The Three Kingdoms: Battle of Shu and Wei; Result: The Shu Kingdom (Characters) successfully defends their literary territory.
110	09/05	May 21, 2021	Chen Feiyu, Bi Wenjun	Theme: The Animal Kingdom "Carbon Emission" Battle; Result: The Carbon Emission team is identified and defeated by the Guardians.
111	09/06	May 28, 2021	Miao Miao	Theme: The "Past Life and Present Life" Village Mystery; Result: The villagers successfully identify the intruders (Li Chen and Zheng Kai).
112	09/07	June 4, 2021	Li Yunrui, Cao Bingkun, Ayanga	Theme: The "Running Man" Sports Games; Result: Team Yellow (Li Chen, Zheng Kai, Lucas) wins the final relay race.
113	09/08	June 11, 2021	Tan Songyun, Zhou Bichang, Li Qin, Jin Jing, Ayanga	Theme: The "Beautiful Rural Life" Experience; Result: Teams complete agricultural tasks to earn points for the village.
114	09/09	June 18, 2021	Guo Qilin, Zhou Jieqiong	Theme: The Protection of the "Food Goddess"; Result: The Guardians successfully identify and protect the target.
115	09/10	June 25, 2021	Wang Hedi, Zhang Zhehan, (Note: Due to controversies surrounding guest Zhang Zhehan in August 2021, this episode was removed from official streaming platforms in China.) Xu Kai, Winwin	Theme: The "Antique Appreciation" & Parallel Space Mystery; Result: The detective team solves the mystery of the time loop.
116	09/11	July 2, 2021	Jackson Wang, Jam Hsiao, Wu Xuanyi	Theme: Summer Vacation Resort Battle; Result: The "Cool Summer" team wins the water gun battle.
117	09/12	July 9, 2021	Meng Ziyi, Jiang Zhenyu, Song Zu'er	Theme: The 100-Year Anniversary Celebration; Result: Cast members complete challenges to light up the celebratory torch.
118	09/13	July 16, 2021	Chen Linong, Yu Yang	Theme: The Final Battle: Mental vs. Physical Strength; Result: Li Chen is crowned the "Strongest Runner" of Season 9.
