= Keep Running: Let's Build a Better Life =

2022 special season of the Chinese television series

- Poster for Let's Build a Better Life
- Starring: Li Chen; Angelababy; Zheng Kai; Sha Yi; Cai Xukun; Bai Lu; Zhou Shen
- No. of episodes: 8

Release
- Original network: ZRTG: Zhejiang Television
- Original release: November 4 – December 30, 2022

Season chronology
- ← Previous; Season 10 Next → Season 11

This is a list of episodes of the Chinese variety show Keep Running in the special spin-off season, Let's Build a Better Life (奔跑吧•共同富裕篇). The show airs on ZRTG: Zhejiang Television. The special season featured the return of the permanent cast members from the tenth season, including Li Chen, Angelababy, Zheng Kai, Sha Yi, Cai Xukun, Bai Lu, and Zhou Shen.

The season premiered on November 4, 2022, and concluded on December 30, 2022, spanning a total of 8 episodes.

== Episodes ==
List of episodes (episode 136–143)
(Series) Episode #	(Season) Episode #	Broadcast Date	Guest(s)	Landmark	Teams		Mission	Results
136	SP3/01	November 4, 2022	Zhang Jianing, Wei Daxun	Jiande, Zhejiang	Running Team	Li Chen, Angelababy, Zheng Kai, Sha Yi, Cai Xukun, Bai Lu, Zhou Shen	New Anjiang Autumn Tour (新安江畔的“秋游”系列)	Teams successfully earn local specialty vouchers by completing agricultural drone and harvesting tasks.
136	SP3/01	November 4, 2022	Zhang Jianing, Wei Daxun	Jiande, Zhejiang	Guest Team	Zhang Jianing, Wei Daxun	New Anjiang Autumn Tour (新安江畔的“秋游”系列)	Teams successfully earn local specialty vouchers by completing agricultural drone and harvesting tasks.
137	SP3/02	November 11, 2022	Sun Yi	Jiande, Zhejiang	No Fixed Teams	Individual Missions	Millennial Ancient Town Revitalization (千年古镇发展史)	Cast completes cultural trivia and rural ecological exploration pathways in Jiande.
138	SP3/03	November 18, 2022	Sun Yi, Chen Zhuoxuan, Fu Longfei	Longyou, Zhejiang	No Fixed Teams	Individual Missions	Traditional Heritage and Youth Sports Relay (传统技艺与运动接力)	Faction groups match industrial metrics to win traditional regional food rewards.
139	SP3/04	November 25, 2022	Chen Zhuoxuan, Fu Longfei	Longyou, Zhejiang	No Fixed Teams	Individual Missions	Beautiful Ecological Villages Tour (生态宜居乡村大观)	Cast finishes environmental awareness games to secure native agricultural gifts.
140	SP3/05	December 9, 2022	Wei Daxun, Li Yitong, Wu Yi, Liu Xiening	Sanming, Fujian	Entrepreneurs Faction	Li Chen, Angelababy, Zheng Kai, Bai Lu, Zhou Shen, Li Yitong, Wu Yi	Shaxian Snacks Store Tycoons (小吃游戏之沙县门店大亨)	"Salted Fish" faction successfully unmasked; entrepreneurs win the simulation enterprise challenge.
140	SP3/05	December 9, 2022	Wei Daxun, Li Yitong, Wu Yi, Liu Xiening	Sanming, Fujian	Salted Fish Faction	Sha Yi, Wei Daxun, Liu Xiening	Shaxian Snacks Store Tycoons (小吃游戏之沙县门店大亨)	"Salted Fish" faction successfully unmasked; entrepreneurs win the simulation enterprise challenge.
141	SP3/06	December 16, 2022	Zhang Ruonan, Tang Xiaotian, Yang Di, Pang Bo	Sanming, Fujian	No Fixed Teams	Individual Missions	Financial Wealth Stewardship Academy (共富理财班公开课)	High-yield investment teams accurately balance simulated capital matrix metrics.
142	SP3/07	December 23, 2022	Vin Zhang, Shen Yue, Zhang Yuxi, Chen Zheyuan, Qiao Xin	Wuyi, Zhejiang	No Fixed Teams	Paired Missions	Low-Carbon Green Life Campaign (低碳绿色生活大挑战)	Individual cast pairs complete energy-saving milestones to clear final constraints.
143	SP3/08	December 30, 2022	Vin Zhang, Shen Yue, Zhang Yuxi, Chen Zheyuan, Qiao Xin	Wuyi, Zhejiang	No Fixed Teams	Paired Missions	Season Finale: Golden Journey Matrix (共富图鉴守护战终章)	The running team preserves the regional industrial roadmap to unlock season rewards.
