= Keep Running season 10 =

2022 season of Chinese television series

Keep Running
- Season 10
- Poster for Season 10
- Starring: Li Chen; Angelababy; Zheng Kai; Sha Yi; Cai Xukun; Bai Lu; Zhou Shen
- No. of episodes: 12

Release
- Original network: ZRTG: Zhejiang Television
- Original release: May 13 – July 29, 2022

Season chronology
- ← Previous; Season 9 Next → Let's Build a Better Life

This is a list of episodes of the Chinese variety show Keep Running in season 10. The show airs on Zhejiang Television. The new season welcomed two new members: Bai Lu and Zhou Shen.

== Episodes ==
List of episodes (episode 124-135)
(Series) Episode #	(Season) Episode #	Broadcast Date	Guest(s)	Landmark	Teams	Mission	Results
124	10/01	13 May 2022	Hu Yanbin, Lin Yun, Meng Jia, Song Yanfei & Meng Ziyi	Leshan, Sichuan	No teams.	Win games and receive clues to find the correct pen pal pairs.	Correct Pairs: Li Chen and Jelly Lin. Sha Yi and Meng Ziyi. The overall group did not succeed in finding correct pairs.
125	10/02	20 May 2022	Joey Yung, Dylan Wang, Mao Xiaotong, Lee Zhuhan & Tang Jiuzhou	Deqing, Zhejiang	Red Team; Green Team; White Team; Black Team	Protect the "exclusive roses" while navigating the floral preservation challenges.	Black Team Wins.
126	10/03	27 May 2022	Dylan Wang, Zhang Bichen & Zhang Dada	Deqing, Zhejiang	Ordinary Users; Anonymous Users (Undercover Users)	Among Virtual Property Heirs ordinary users must uncover identities of the anonymous users before anonymous users steal virtual property worth 10 million.	Anonymous Users Wins.
127	10/04	3 June 2022	Hu Yanbin, Wang Ju	Emei Mountain, Leshan, Sichuan	Good Team; Nine Yin White Bone Team	Good Team must identify and vote out the main Nine Yin White Bone hidden role	Nine Yin White Bone Team Wins.
128	10/05	10 June 2022	Shin, Qin Xiaoxian, Wu Xuanyi, Yu Yang & Chen Youwei	Jingning, Zhejiang	White Team; Black Team	Both teams must compete in the "Mushroom King Championship" and collect the most amount of mushrooms while each team must also complete secret mission against their team leader.	White Team Wins.
129	10/06	17 June 2022	Shin, Qin Xiaoxian, Shan Yichun & Shao Bing	Lishui, Zhejiang	Musical Faction; Critic Faction	Pass pitch verification mechanics and secure composition tags through standard sound matching.	Musical Faction Wins.
130	10/07 (Note: Zheng Kai was absent from this episode due to paternity leave following the birth of his second child.)	24 June 2022	Jin Chen, Yuan Yawei, Ni Hongjie & Jin Jing	Jinhua, Zhejiang	Management Division; Independent Division	Isolate bad actors hidden within the industrial firm and capture valid target consumer metrics.	Management Division Wins.
131	10/08	1 July 2022	Jin Chen, Jin Jing, Yang Di & Li Dan	Jinhua, Zhejiang	Time Travelers; Matrix Sentinels	Re-align temporal anchor parameters to unlock space-time locks throughout the maze coordinate grids.	Time Travelers Wins.
132	10/09	8 July 2022	CoCo Lee, Nie Yuan, Wei Daxun & Curley G	Changji, Xinjiang	Imperial Kitchen Faction; Rival Kitchen Faction	Synthesize authentic regional ingredients based on cryptographically masked historical culinary steps.	Imperial Kitchen Faction Wins.
133	10/10	15 July 2022	Liu Genghong, Lu Xiaojun, Xu Mengtao, Zhang Changning, Gao Tingyu & Wei Daxun	Changji, Xinjiang	Red Athletics Team; Blue Athletics Team	Surpass the benchmark physical index velocities while performing complex coordination routines.	Draw.
134	10/11	22 July 2022	Chen Yaxin (An Qi) & Lu Keran	Turpan, Xinjiang	Salt Merchants; Spies	Isolate structural strategic tells to systematically isolate tracking threats within the deduction game.	Secret Identity Holders Wins.
135	10/12	29 July 2022	Zhao Lusi & Jiang Dunhao	Turpan, Xinjiang	Group 1: (Li Chen, Angelababy, Zhou Shen); Group 2: (Sha Yi, Cai Xukun, Bai Lu)	Safeguard high-value cargo across designated geographical checkpoints before destination expiration.	Group 1 Wins.
