= Running Man China season 4 =

Running Man China
- Season 4
- Poster for Season 4
- No. of episodes: 12

Release
- Original network: ZRTG: Zhejiang Television
- Original release: April 15 – July 1, 2016

Season chronology
- ← Previous; Season 3 Next → Season 5

This is a list of episodes of the Chinese variety show Running Man in season 4. The show airs on ZRTG: Zhejiang Television.

== Episodes ==
List of episodes (episode 40–51)
(Series) Episode #	(Season) Episode #	Broadcast Date	Guest(s)	Landmark	Teams		Mission	Result	Cumulative Running Balls
40	4/01	April 15, 2016	Blackie Chen	Hangzhou Museum (Hangzhou, Zhejiang)	No teams	Final Mission; Bitter Melon Brothers; Wong Cho-lam, Blackie Chen	Earn over 20 badges in a badge ripping contest.	Li Chen Wins; Li Chen wins 1 running ball.	Li Chen 1 Deng Chao 0 Chen He 0 Angelababy 0 Zheng Kai 0 Luhan 0 Wong Cho-lam 0
41	4/02	April 22, 2016	He Sui, Janine Chang, Jia Ling, Lin Yun, Ma Sichun	Hangzhou Grand Theatre (Hangzhou, Zhejiang)	Battle of the World Princess; Deng Chao, Lin Yun; Jerry Li, Janine Chang; Wong Cho-Lam, He Sui; Ryan Zheng, Angelababy; Michael Chen, Jia Ling; Luhan, Ma Sichun	Final Mission; Deng Chao, Lin Yun; Li Chen, He Sui; Wong Cho-lam, Jia Ling; Ryan Zheng, Ma Sichun; Chen He, Janine Chang; Luhan, Angelababy	Collect the 6 items in a nametag ripping contest	Li Chen, He Sui Win Li Chen wins 1 running ball.	Li Chen 2 Deng Chao 0 Chen He 0 Angelababy 0 Zheng Kai 0 Luhan 0 Wong Cho-lam 0
42	4/03	April 29, 2016	Ella Chen, Lin Gengxin	Xiamen Chengyi Science and Technology Exploration Centre (Xiamen, Fujian)	FBR (Fantastic Brilliant Running Man) "Blank" Agents; Deng Chao, Chen He; Other Agents(No teams); Li Chen, Angelababy, Zheng Kai, Luhan, Wong Cho-lam, Ella Chen, Lin Gengxin		Find the gold badge	Deng Chao, Chen He Wins They both win 1 running ball each.	Li Chen 2 Deng Chao 1 Chen He 1 Angelababy 0 Zheng Kai 0 Luhan 0 Wong Cho-lam 0
43	4/04	May 6, 2016	Ivy Chen, Zhang Tianai	Xiamen, Fujian	Top Three Students Contest; Angelababy, Zheng Kai, Chen He; Deng Chao, Luhan, Ivy Chen; Li Chen, Wang Cho-lam, Zhang Tianai		Be the last team standing in a variation of freeze tag	Team of Angelababy, Zheng Kai, and Chen He Win They all win 1 running ball each.	Li Chen 2 Deng Chao 1 Chen He 2 Angelababy 1 Zheng Kai 1 Luhan 0 Wong Cho-lam 0
44	4/05	May 13, 2016	The cast of Running Man : (Yoo Jae-suk, Ji Suk-jin, Kim Jong-kook, Gary, Haha, Song Ji-hyo, Lee Kwang-soo)	South Korea	Li Chen, Song Ji-hyo; Deng Chao, Yoo Jae-suk; Chen He, Ji Suk-jin; Angelababy, Kim Jong-kook; Zheng Kai, Gary; Luhan, Haha; Wong Cho-lam, Lee Kwang-soo		Eliminate the other teams by ripping their paper bracelets and nametags	Team Luhan and Haha Win Luhan wins 1 running ball.	Li Chen 2 Deng Chao 1 Chen He 2 Angelababy 1 Zheng Kai 1 Luhan 1 Wong Cho-lam 0
45	4/06	May 20, 2016	Jason Zhang, Rain, Tan Weiwei	Yunnan	Yellow Team; Li Chen, Chen He, Wang Cho-lam, Zheng Kai, Tan Weiwei; Blue Team; Angelababy, Deng Chao, Luhan, Rain, Jason Zhang	Final Mission; No Teams	Complete 4 rows of tic tac toe with a board made up of eliminated players	Luhan Wins Luhan wins 1 running ball.	Li Chen 2 Deng Chao 1 Chen He 2 Angelababy 1 Zheng Kai 1 Luhan 2 Wong Cho-lam 0
46	4/07	May 27, 2016	Song Joong-ki, Zhang Yuqi	South Korea	Running Man Team and Zhang Yuqi vs. Song Joong-ki	Final Mission; Spies Team; Song Joong-ki, Zheng Kai; Others; Li Chen, Chen He, Wang Cho-lam, Angelababy, Zhang Yuqi, Luhan, Deng Caho	Find the running ball while avoiding becoming a spy	Wang Cho-lam and Li Chen Win They win 1 running ball each.	Li Chen 3 Deng Chao 1 Chen He 2 Angelababy 1 Zheng Kai 1 Luhan 2 Wong Cho-lam 1
47	4/08	June 3, 2016	Su Youpeng, Zhang Hanyu		Animals Team (no teams); Li Chen, Zheng Kai, Angelababy, Wang Cho-lam, Chen He, Deng Chao, Zhang Hanyu; Murderers Team; Luhan, Su Youpeng		Solve the murder mystery	Chen He Wins, Chen He wins 1 running ball.	Li Chen 3 Deng Chao 1 Chen He 3 Angelababy 1 Zheng Kai 1 Luhan 2 Wong Cho-lam 1
48	4/09	June 10, 2016	Na Ying, Song Xiaobao	Ningbo	No Teams		Be the last one standing in a Weibo Nametag Elimination game	Na Ying Wins and gifts 1 running ball to Luhan	Li Chen 3 Deng Chao 1 Chen He 3 Angelababy 1 Zheng Kai 1 Luhan 3 Wong Cho-lam 1
49	4/10	June 17, 2016	Liu Wei, Yang Kun, Yangwei Linghua, Zeng Yi (Phoenix Legend)		Wolf Team; Li Chen, Chen He, Zheng Kai, Angelababy, Liu Wei; Sheep Team; Deng Chao, Wang Cho-lam, Yang Kun, Zeng Yi, Yangwei Linghua; Spies; Deng Chao, Li Chen		Find the wolf in sheep clothing/sheep in wolf clothing	Wolf Team wins Running balls were given for every challenge	Li Chen 4 Deng Chao 5 Chen He 6 Angelababy 7 Zheng Kai 5 Luhan 4 Wong Cho-lam 2
50	4/11	June 24, 2016	Jiang Shuying, Jimmy Lin		No Teams		Escape Planet R	Running Man Team Wins; Everyone receives one running ball	Li Chen 5 Deng Chao 6 Chen He 7 Angelababy 8 Zheng Kai 6 Luhan 5 Wong Cho-lam 3
51	4/12 Season Finale	July 1, 2016	Blackie Chen, Hua Chenyu, Jacky Heung, Qiao Shan, Wang Ziwen, Yue Yunpeng, Zhang Jingchu	Hohhot, Inner Mongolia	Deng Chao and Yue Yunpeng, Angelababy and Jacky Heung, Li Chen and Qiao Shan, Zheng Kai and Wang Ziwen, Chen He and Zhang Jingchu, Wang Cho-lam and Blackie Chen, Luhan and Hua Chenyu		Be the last one standing in a superpower rip off the name tag competition	Deng Chao wins Becomes season 4 champion	n/a
