= Keep Running: The Greater Bay Area =

2026 special season of the Chinese television series

- Starring: Li Chen; Zheng Kai; Sha Yi; Bai Lu; Fan Chengcheng; Zhang Zhenyuan; Meng Ziyi; Li Yunrui
- No. of episodes: 1

Release
- Original network: ZRTG: Zhejiang Television
- Original release: November 21, 2026 – present

Season chronology
- ← Previous; Season 14

This is a list of episodes of the Chinese variety show Keep Running special season (Chinese: 奔跑吧·大湾区篇; pinyin: Bēnpǎo Ba · Dàwānqū Piān) in the Greater Bay Area. The show aired on ZRTG: Zhejiang Television.

== Episodes ==
List of episodes (episodes 216-)
(Series) Episode #	(Season) Episode #	Broadcast Date	Guest(s)	Landmark	Teams	Mission	Results
216	TGBA/01	21 November 2026	Wong Cho-lam	Nansha, Guangzhou, China	All members are Brothers Team	Complete a mission of answering five questions about 1000 Greater Bay Area young adults! Whoever answers all five right is victorious.	Zheng Kai WINS Zheng Kai gives prize to Wong Cho-lam.
217	TGBA/02	28 November 2026	Wong Cho-lam, Xu Zhisheng	Foshan, Guangzhou, China		Complete games to earn the tasty food of the Greater Bay Area.	
