= Keep Running season 6 =

2018 season of Chinese television series

Keep Running
- Season 6
- Poster for Season 6

Release
- Original network: ZRTG: Zhejiang Television
- Original release: April 13 – June 29, 2018

Season chronology
- ← Previous; Season 5 Next → Season 7

This is a list of episodes of the Chinese variety show Keep Running in season 6. The show airs on ZRTG: Zhejiang Television.

== Episodes ==
List of episodes (episode 64–75)
(Series) Episode #	(Season) Episode #	Broadcast Date	Guest(s)	Landmark	Teams		Mission	Result
64	6/01	April 13, 2018	No Guest	Vienna, Austria	Personal battle	Ultimate Challenge: No Teams	Personal battle: Win missions to earn 100 000 Yuan under the winner's name. Ultimate Challenge: Everyone have to give a speech to the invited guests about the United Nations' 17 Sustainable Development Goals.	Deng Chao, Angelababy, Li Chen, and Wong Cho-lam Wins. They get to donate funds under their personal name.
65	6/02 (Note: Wong Cho-lam did not participate in this week's filming due to scheduling issues.)	April 20, 2018	Wu Xiubo, Hannah Quinlivan, Song Zu'er, Zhong Chuxi, Selina Jen, Lan Yingying	Innsbruck, Austria	Deng Chao & Song Zu'er; Li Chen & Zhong Chuxi; Zheng Kai & Hannah Quinlivan; Chen He & Selina; Angelababy & Wu Xiubo; Luhan & Lan Ying Ying		Beat the other teams, Couple Race	No winners
66	6/03	April 27, 2018	Wu Xiubo, Hannah Quinlivan, Song Zu'er, Zhong Chuxi, Selina Jen, Lan Yingying	Innsbruck, Austria	Red Team: Song Zu'er (Team Captain), Deng Chao, Angelababy, Luhan, Wu Xiubo, Lan Yingying; Yellow Team: Hannah Quinlivan (Team Captain), Li Chen, Chen He, Zheng Kai, Zhong Chuxi, Selina		2020 Beijing Winter Olympics Special: Beat the other teams Challenge 1: Snowball fight tug-o-war: Yellow Team Wins; Challenge 2: Tube Sledding Race: Yellow Team Wins; Challenge 3: Strip Trivia: Red Team Wins; Challenge 4: Ice Rink Relay: Red Team Wins; Tie Breaker: Human Curling: Yellow Team Wins	Yellow Team Wins. Yellow Team receives gold medals.
67	6/04	May 4, 2018	He Yujun, Hui Ruoqi, Wu Dajing, Su Bingtian, Zhang Guowei, Xu Yaping (Note: Xu Yaping was invited as a Dragon Boat coach to help prepare the members for the race.)	Hangzhou, China	No Teams		Beat the different Universities in a Dragon Boat Race	No winners
68	6/05	May 11, 2018	He Yujun, Hui Ruoqi, Wu Dajing, Su Bingtian, Zhang Guowei, Xu Yaping	Hangzhou, China	No Teams		Beat the different Universities in a Dragon Boat Race	No winners
69	6/06	May 18, 2018	Sha Yi (Note: Robert Downey Jr., Mark Ruffalo, Tom Holland and Tom Hiddleston were invited to announce missions to the members.)	Shanxi, China	No Teams		Beat the other members	Wong Cho-lam Wins. Wong Cho-lam get to wear the Running Man's superhero suit.
70	6/07	May 25, 2018	Wang Luodan, Ouyang Nana, Fan Chengcheng (Nine Percent)	Shanxi, China	Running Man Team vs 100 workers Team		Beat the 100 workers	Workers Team Wins. Worker Jia Shukai won the final mission and receives a gold medal while other 99 received consolation prize.
71	6/08	June 1, 2018	Fan Zhiyi, Li Yi, Du Jiang, Yang Mi, Zhang Yunlong, Li Jiayue, Luís Figo, Zhao Yixiong (Note: Luís Figo, Li Jiayue and Zhao Yixiong were invited to only for the final mission.)	Jiangsu, China	Red Team: Fan Zhiyi, Chen He, Zheng Kai, Yang Mi'; Li Jiayue; White Team: Deng Chao, Angelababy, Luhan, Zhang Yunlong, Luis Figo Blue Team: Li Chen, Li Yi, Wong Cho-lam, Du Jiang, Zhao Yixiong		Beat the other teams by scoring more goals against 100 kids in the final mission	Blue Team Wins. Blue Team won tickets to attend the 2018 FIFA World Cup finals.
72	6/09 (Note: Luhan did not participate in this week's filming due to health issues.)	June 8, 2018	Deng Jiajia, Sun Yizhou, Li Jinming, Li Jiahang and Lou Yixiao	Tianjin, China	Running Man meets iPartment Special: Purple Team: Deng Chao, Chen He, Wong Cho-lam, Lou Yixiao White Team: Li Chen, Deng Jiajia, Li Jiahang Yellow Team: Zheng Kai, Angelababy, Sun Yizhou, Li Jinming	Final mission: Running Man Team: Deng Chao, Li Chen, Wong Cho-lam, Zheng Kai, Angelababy iPartment Team: Chen He, Lou Yixiao, Deng Jiajia, Li Jiahang, Sun Yizhou, Li Jinming	Beat the other teams	iPartment Team Wins the final mission. iPartment Team won presents chosen by the members.
73	6/10 (Note: Li Chen left early for the hospital in this week's filming due to an accident while filming.)	June 15, 2018	Angela Chang, Song Xiaobao, Han Xue	Taiyuan, Shanxi, China	Running School Graduation: Economics Team: Deng Chao, Angelababy, Zheng Kai, Han Xue, Song Xiaobao; Agriculture Team: Li Chen, Chen He, Luhan, Wong Cholam, Angela Chang	Family Singing competition and Final mission: Zheng Family: Zheng Kai, Angela Chang; Song Family: Song Xiaobao, Wong Cho-lam; Han Family: Han Xue, Chen He; Yang Family: Angelababy, Luhan; Deng Family: Deng Chao, Li Chen	Beat the other teams	Deng Family Wins the final mission. Deng Chao and Li Chen won ingots.
74	6/11 (Note: Cai Xukun did not participate in this filming.)	June 22, 2018	Jason Zhang, Jane Zhang, Darren Wang, Nine Percent	Suzhou, Jiangsu, China	Midyear Concert Special: Green Team: Jane Zhang, Wong Cho-lam, Zheng Kai, Deng Chao, Luhan; Pink Team: Jason Zhang, Chen He, Angelababy, Li Chen, Darren Wang	Final Mission: Running Man Team: Deng Chao, Li Chen, Wong Cho-lam, Zheng Kai, Luhan, Angelababy, Chen He, Jason Zhang, Jane Zhang, Darren Wang; Nine Percent: Chen Linong, Fan Chengcheng, Justin, Lin Yanjun, Zhu Zhengting, Wang Ziyi, Wang Linkai; You Zhangjing	Beat the other teams	Pink Team Wins. Green Team had to release their original version of the song before it was autotuned.
75	6/12	June 29, 2018	Wei Daxun	Tianjin, China	No Teams		Beat the other members	Angelababy Wins. Angelababy wins a golden card.
