= Keep Running season 5 =

2017 season of Chinese television series

Keep Running
- Season 5
- Poster for Season 5

Release
- Original network: ZRTG: Zhejiang Television
- Original release: April 14 – July 7, 2017

Season chronology
- ← Previous; Season 4 Next → Season 6

This is a list of episodes of the Chinese variety show Keep Running in season 5. In this season, the show changes its name to Keep Running. The show airs on ZRTG: Zhejiang Television.

== Episodes ==
List of episodes (episode 52–63)
(Series) Episode #	(Season) Episode #	Broadcast Date	Guest(s)	Landmark	Teams		Mission	Result
52	5/01	April 14, 2017	Carina Lau, Bosco Wong, Yuan Shanshan, Wei Daxun, Guan Xiaotong	Yiwu, Zhejiang	Red Team: Wong Cho-lam, Bosco Wong, Yuan Shanshan Yellow Team: Li Chen, Michael Chen, Guan Xiaotong; Blue Team: Deng Chao, Carina Lau, Wei Daxun; Green Team: Zheng Kai, Lu Han, Dilraba		Get the most toy houses	Red Team Wins; Red Team received 3 golden abacus. Blue team received 3 crowns for giving a heartwarming speech.
53	5/02	April 21, 2017	William Chan, JJ Lin	Hangzhou, Zhejiang	Running Man Team: Deng Chao, Li Chen, Chen He, Luhan, Zheng Kai, Wong Cho-lam, Dilraba, JJ, William Name Tag Elimination: Spy Team: Luhan, Deng Chao, JJ; Running Man Team: Li Chen, Chen He, Zheng Kai, Wong Cho-lam, Dilraba, William		Win against 400 viewers	Running Man Team Wins; Running Man Team received golden teapot sets.
54	5/03	April 28, 2017	Lin Chi-ling, Joey Yung, Charlene Choi, Tang Yixin, Li Qin	Dali, Yunnan	Race between men and women Men; Deng Chao, Li Chen, Wong Cho-lam, Zheng Kai, Chen He, Luhan; Women; Dilraba, Lin Chi-ling, Joey Yung, Charlene Choi, Tang Yixin, Li Qin		Beat the other teams	Men's Team Wins; The men's team received trophies and got to assign the teams for the next episode.
55	5/04	May 5, 2017	Lin Chi-ling, Joey Yung, Charlene Choi, Tang Yixin, Li Qin	Dali, Yunnan	Tour; Deng Chao, Charlene Choi; Li Chen, Joey Yung; Wong Cho-lam, Lin Chi-ling; Zheng Kai, Tang Yixin; Chen He, Li Qin; Luhan, Dilraba		Beat the other teams	Li Chen, Joey Yung，Chen He, Li Qin，Luhan, Dilraba Wins; They won a golden bracelet Li Chen, Chen He and Luhan gave their golden bracelets to Lin Chi-ling, Charlene Choi and Tang Yixin.
56	5/05	May 12, 2017	Jia Ling, Jing Tian, Li Yundi, (Note: Li Yundi only appeared as special guest pianist in episode 5.) Jackson Wang, (GOT7) (Note: Jackson only appeared in episode 6.)	Yan An, Shaanxi	No teams		Finish performing the concert	Everyone Wins.
57	5/06	May 19, 2017	Jia Ling, Jing Tian, Li Yundi, Jackson Wang, (GOT7)	Yan An, Shaanxi	Waist Drums Team: Deng Chao, Li Chen, Luhan, Jing Tian and Jia Ling Traditional Fan Team: Zheng Kai, Chen He, Dilraba, Cho-lam and Jackson Wang		Beat the other teams	Waist Drums team Wins; Waist Drums team wins travel prizes. All guests receive gift pack.
58	5/07	May 26, 2017	Liu Tao, Ma Dong	Dali, Yunnan	The case of Envoys Investigators: Chen He, Zheng Kai; Killers: Li Chen, Ma Dong; Envoys: Luhan, Dilraba, Liu Tao, Wong Cho-lam; Gods Power: Deng Chao		Find the killers	Everyone except the killers Wins.
59	5/08	June 2, 2017	None (Return of Angelababy (Note: Angelababy mentioned that she had the same accommodation arrangements as a guest, and is introduced as such, but since she ended her maternity hiatus as a regular member, it is recorded as "no guest".))	Dalian, Liaoning	Angelababy's team: Wong Cho-lam, Zheng Kai, Deng Chao; Dilraba's team: Li Chen, Lu Han, Chen He	Final team: Angelababy vs everyone	Hidden Surprise: Team members in Angelababy's team must deliberately lose every challenge except Name Tag Battle where Angelababy must win as sole survivor. All teams from both sides but Angelababy must be eliminated in the name-tag elimination game in front of her or have Angelababy eliminate them without Angelababy's suspicion.	Everyone except Angelababy Wins; All members can each send a gift to Angelababy. Everyone except Angelababy received golden necklaces.
60	5/09	June 9, 2017	Guo Jingfei, Ethan Juan, Karena Lam (Note: Karena appeared only in the Name Tag Elimination game.)	Dalian, Liaoning	No teams	Name tag Elimination; Guardian: Deng Chao, Lu Han, Wang Cho-lam, Zheng Kai, Karena Lam; Robber: Angelababy, Dilraba, Ethan Juan, Guo Jing Fei, Li Chen, Chen He	Restore each memory and find their own identity	Guardian's Team Wins; Guardian Team wins golden bracelets except Dilraba as she chose to be robber when she is actually a Guardian.
61	5/10	June 16, 2017	Li Xian, Ariel Lin, Allen Ren, Zhang Kaili	Zhengzhou, Henan	Sunset TV; Deng Chao, Li Chen, Zhang Kaili; Food Channel TV; Dilraba, Chen He, Ariel Lin; Running Music TV; Wong Cho-lam, Luhan, Allen Ren; Muscle TV; Angelababy, Zheng Kai, Li Xian		Beat the other teams	Muscle TV Wins; Muscle TV wins golden medals.
62	5/11	June 23, 2017	Yang Xuwen, Zhu Yawen	Prague, Czech Republic	No teams	Name tag Elimination; Running Man China; Angelababy, Chen He, Deng Chao, Dilraba, Li Chen, Luhan, Wong Cho-lam, Yang Xuwen, Zheng Kai, Zhu Yawen; Running Man Czech; Milan Škoda, Karel Vejmelka	Beat the other teams	Running Man Czech Wins.
63	5/12	June 30, 2017	Wang Leehom, Cherrie Ying, Zhang Tianai, Elvis Han	Prague, Czech Republic	Deng Chao, Wang Leehom; Li Chen, Elvis Han; Chen He, Zhang Tianai; Wong Cho-lam, Cherrie Ying; Zheng Kai, Angelababy; Luhan, Dilraba		Beat the other teams	Wang Leehom and Deng Chao Wins; They won golden bracelet.
