= Keep Running season 14 =

2026 season of Chinese television series

Keep Running
- Season 14
- Poster for Season 14
- Starring: Li Chen; Zheng Kai; Sha Yi; Bai Lu; Fan Chengcheng; Zhang Zhenyuan; Meng Ziyi; Li Yunrui
- No. of episodes: 12

Release
- Original network: ZRTG: Zhejiang Television
- Original release: 24 April – 10 July 2026

Season chronology
- ← Previous; Heavenly Road Next → Greater Bay Area

This is a list of episodes of the Chinese variety show Keep Running in season 14. The show airs on ZRTG: Zhejiang Television. Sponsored by WALOVI, this is the first new sponsor since Season 2, after 11 years of sponsorship by Anmuxi Yogurt.

This season welcomed two new members: Meng Ziyi and Li Yunrui. Yuqi was absent due to a head injury sustained during I-dle's Syncopation World Tour. Zhou Shen was absent due to schedule conflicts with his ongoing concert tour.

== Cast ==
Legend: 🏆 Winner Participant Absent

Cast members	Episode											
Cast members	1	2	3	4	5	6	7	8	9	10	11	12
Li Chen				🏆	🏆		🏆	🏆			🏆	🏆
Zheng Kai				🏆		🏆		🏆			🏆	🏆
Sha Yi					🏆							🏆
Bai Lu		🏆	🏆	🏆	🏆							🏆
Fan Chengcheng		🏆	🏆	🏆						🏆	🏆	🏆
Zhang Zhenyuan	🏆		🏆					🏆				🏆
Meng Ziyi											🏆	🏆
Li Yunrui		🏆		🏆								🏆

== Episodes ==
List of episodes (episode 204–215)
(Series) Episode #	(Season) Episode #	Broadcast Date	Guest(s)	Landmark	Teams	Mission	Results	Name Tag Battle Results	
204	14/01	24 April 2026	Teens in Times; Ma Jiaqi; Ding Chengxin; Song Yaxuan; Liu Yaowen; Yan Haoxiang; He Junlin	Haikou, Hainan	Blue Team: Keep Running Team (except Zhang Zhenyuan) Yellow Team: Teen in Times, Zhang Zhenyuan	Through 5 different athletic activities, teams earn points and multipliers for each activity. Team with the most points wins.	Yellow Team WINS (2475pts)(BLUE: 2349pts) Prize: Hainan Coconut Carving "Horse Head"	Blue Team: Li Chen (OUT); Zheng Kai (OUT); Sha Yi (OUT); Bai Lu (OUT); Fan Chengcheng (OUT); Meng Ziyi (OUT); Li Yunrui (OUT)	Yellow Team: Ma Jiaqi (OUT); Ding Chengxin (OUT); Song Yaxuan (OUT); Liu Yaowen (OUT); Zhang Zhenyuan; Yan Haoxiang; He Junlin (OUT)
205	14/02	01 May 2026	Chen Zheyuan, Lars Huang	Haikou, Hainan	Loyal Team: Li Chen, Zheng Kai, Sha Yi, Zhang Zhenyuan, Meng Ziyi, Chen Zheyuan, Lars Huang Moles Team: Bai Lu, Fan Chengcheng, Li Yunrui	Members act as Murong Group board members; the Loyal team must eliminate the Moles through clues before they steal key info.	Moles Team WINS Moles Team each receives a red string braided bracelet with pure gold charms.	Loyal Team: Li Chen (OUT); Zheng Kai (OUT); Sha Yi (OUT); Meng Ziyi; Chen Zheyuan; Lars Huang (OUT x2)	Moles Team: Bai Lu (OUT x2); Fan Chengcheng (OUT/revived); Li Yunrui
206	14/03	8 May 2026	Sun Qian, Wei Daxun, Xu Yiyang, Zhou Jieqiong	Haikou, Hainan	White Team: Fan Chengcheng (Coach), Bai Lu, Zhang Zhenyuan, Wei Daxun, Xu Yiyang Red Team: Sha Yi (coach), Li Chen, Zheng Kai, Sun Qian, Zhou Jieqiong	Teams take on various athletic and team chemistry activities to win perks for the final soccer relay game. Team to first earn 4pts in the final game wins.	White Team WINS White Team each receives a pure gold soccer memorabilia ticket.	N/A, did not play	
207	14/04	15 May 2026	Ni Hongjie, Hu Ke, Miao Miao, Shen Yujie, Xu Zhisheng	Quanzhou, Fujian	Yellow Team: Meng Ziyi, Xu Zhisheng Blue Team: Li Chen, Ni Hongjie Green Team: Bai Lu, Li Yunrui Purple Team: Sha Yi, Hu Ke Pink Team: Zheng Kai, Miao Miao Black Team: Fan Chengcheng, Shen Yujie	Winning teams in each game can roll two dice to earn Eel. Each team must end with 9 Eels at the end of day to win; their team count resets to 0 if they roll a total greater than 9.	Blue, Green, Pink, Black; WINS Winning Teams each receive a pure gold stamp.	N/A, did not play	
208	14/05	22 May 2026	Mao Xiaotong, Yu Yang, Zhai Zilu, Zhou Yiran	Quanzhou, Fujian	Ge Ge Da (Lucky) Team: (Li Chen, Bai Lu, Fan Chengcheng, Li Yunrui, Mao Xiaotong, Zhou Yiran, Yu Yang) Hei Mo Mo (Coal) Team: (Zheng Kai, Sha Yi, Zhai Zilu) (Note: These are initial teams. First Exchange turned Bai Lu, Mao Xiaotong, Yu Yang into Coal Team. Second Exchange turned Zheng Kai, Li Yunrui into Coal Team, and Yu Yang stay. Teams further changed during last name tag battle to acquire both Lucky and Coal plushies to win final prize.)	Members solved clues to find the Golden Egg inside the Coal Plushies. Switching it for a Lucky Plushie wins the final prize. Members with Coal Plushie at end of match will suffer punishment.	Li Chen, Sha Yi, Bai Lu WINS Each winner receives a gold charm bracelet. Li Chen gifts his prize to Zheng Kai.	N/A, played a variation where ripping name tag was swapping plushies. (OUT) are not possible in this variation.	
209	14/06	29 May 2026	Alina Zhang, Chen Linong, Zhang Kangle, Fiona Sit, Tang Jiuzhou, Zhai Zilu	Xiamen, Fujian	White Team: Li Chen, Fan Chengcheng, Bai Lu, Chen Linong Blue Team: Sha Yi, Li Yunrui, Zhang Kangle, Alina Zhang Yellow Team: Zheng Kai, Zhai Zilu, Tang Jiuzhou, Fiona Sit	Members transformed into descendants of Minnan R Family. Through clues, they compete to unlock each other's characters to open the mysterious century-sealed treasure chest.	Yellow Team WINS Yellow Team each receives a pure gold trophy ring.	N/A, played a variation where ripping name tag revealed their character to other members. (OUT) are not possible in this variation.	
210	14/07	05 June 2026	Liu Yuxin, Peng Yuchang, Cheng Lei	Anyang, Henan	Guardians: Zheng Kai (Sheep), Sha Yi (Pig), Fan Chengcheng (Tiger), Zhang Zhenyuan (Ox), Li Yunrui (Turtle), Bai Lu & Liu Yuxin (Owl) Cultural Spirit Team: Li Chen (Phone Case), Peng Yuchang (Chess), Cheng Lei (Keyboard)	Members transform into "Guardians" of bronze artifacts and "Cultural Spirits" from the modern world. Through games and clues, members work to determine who the true Guardians of the bronze artifacts are through voting.	Cultural Spirit WINS Zhang Zhenyuan & Li Yunrui were voted out during final voting. Cultural Spirit Team each receives a black string bracelet with a pure gold charm.	N/A, did not play	
211	14/08	12 June 2026	Zhang Weili, Cheng Lei, Zhou Keyu	Handan, Hebei	Black Team: Li Chen (Lower-Middle Horse), Zheng Kai (Middle Horse), Zhang Zhenyuan (Upper-Middle Horse), Zhou Keyu (Top Horse), Cheng Lei (Bottom Horse) White Team: Sha Yi (Lower-Middle Horse, Out), Bai Lu (Upper-Middle Horse), Fan Chengcheng (Bottom Horse), Li Yunrui (Top Horse), Zhang Weili (Middle Horse)	Members transform into people from the State of Qi in 306 BC and travel to Handan in the State of Zhao to learn their way of walking. By winning games, they figure out each other's identities. The team with highest rank horse alive after the final elimination is the winner.	Black Team WINS Sha Yi, Zhou Keyu were eliminated after last game. Li Yunrui, Bai Lu, Zhang Weili were eliminated during final elimination. Black Team each receives a pure gold lucky horse woven bracelet.	N/A, did not play	
212	14/09	19 June 2026	Yang Di, Huang Xinchun, Chen Lijun, Tian Jiarui, Wang Hongyi	Jiaxing, Zhejiang	No teams, individual competition	Each member makes a Golden Zongzi with a hidden gold nugget inside. Members compete in games to earn Zongzi Vouchers, which can be traded for extra Zongzi. In the final round, everyone places their Zongzi on their own display shelf, and players who find and identify another member's Golden Zongzi win.	Chen Lijun & Tian Jiarui WINS Each winner receives a red string braided bracelet with a pure gold charm.	N/A, played a variation where ripping name tag allowed you to earn their Zongzi vouchers Li Chen, Fan Chengcheng, Zhang Zhenyuen, Tian Jiarui were (OUT) in the variation name tag game.	
213	14/10	27 June 2026	Yu Yang, Huang Xinchun, Lai Weiming, Curley G	Jiaxing, Zhejiang	Team Zheng Kai (ZK): (Zheng Kai, Bai Lu, Meng Ziyi, Lai Weiming) Team Fan Chengcheng (FCC): (Fan Chengcheng, Zhang Zhenyuan, Huang Xinchun, Curley G) Team Sha Yi (SY): (Sha Yi, Li Chen, Yu Yang) (Note: These are initial teams. Yu Yang switched to Team ZK after Game 1. Li Chen switched to Team FCC after Game 2. Bai Lu & Yu Yang switched to Team FCC after Game 3. Zhang Zhenyuan switched to Team SY after Game 3. Meng Ziyi was chosen to Team FCC after Game 4. Zhang Zhenyuan switched to Team FCC after Game 4.)	Zheng Kai, Sha Yi, and Fan Chengcheng were asked separately to help pack the gift turtles for everyone. The next day, the gift turtles disappeared. Among the three, who is the "Good-hearted Person" and who is the "Greedy Person"?	Fan Chengcheng WINS Winner receives a red string braided necklace with a pure gold charm.	N/A, did not play	
214	14/11	3 July 2026	Liu Xiening, Zhang Ruonan	Shanghai & Hangzhou, Zhejiang	Group 1: (Zhang Zhenyuan, Li Chen) Group 2: (Fan Chengcheng, Zheng Kai Group 3: (Sha Yi, Liu Xiening) Group 4: (Meng Ziyi, Zhang Ruonan) Group 5: (Li Yunrui, Bai Lu) (Note: These are final teams. Initial start teams were Bai Lu & Liu Xiening (Group 1), Li Chen & Zheng Kai (Group 2), Li Yunrui & Zhang Zhenyuan (Group 3), Meng Ziyi & Sha Yi (Group 4), Fan Chengcheng & Zhang Ruonan (Group 5). Teams changed from game to game depending on which member/room they were switched to.)	Members embark on a dream train journey aboard the "Yangtze River Delta Star" Tourist Train. The group tackles challenges station by station along the route, searching for clues, and competing to see who can "awake" from the dream first. The first four are winners.	Li Chen, Zheng Kai, Fan Chengcheng, Meng Ziyi WINS Each winner receives a red string braided bracelet with a pure gold charm.	N/A, played a variation where ripping name tag ended their alarm timer and chance to awake from the dream. Sha Yi, Li Yunrui, Zhang Zhenyuen were (OUT) in the variation name tag game.	
215	14/12	10 July 2026	Liu Xiening, Zhang Ruonan	Hangzhou, Zhejiang	All members are Brothers Team	Members worked together to overcome challenges and unlock the prize and surprise behind a mysterious safe.	Brothers Team WINS All members received a red string braided bracelet with pure gold charms and a pure gold necklace.	N/A, played a variation where ripping name tag eliminates the need for their key to unlock the safe, but no prize for the eliminated member. No name tags were ultimately ripped, Brothers Team chose to unlock the safe through solving clues.	

== Winners ==
Legend: Rank 1 Rank 3 Multi-Wins (Honorable)

Rank	Member (Note: Names under same rank listed in ABC order)	Win(s)	Appearance(s)	%Win (Note: Rounded to nearest whole %)	Notes
1	Fan Chengcheng	6	12	50%	(Ep. 2, 3, 4, 10, 11, 12)
1	Li Chen	6	12	50%	(Ep. 2, 3, 4, 10, 11, 12)
3	Bai Lu	5	12	42%	(Ep. 2, 3, 4, 5, 12)
3	Zheng Kai	5	12	42%	(Ep. 2, 3, 4, 5, 12)
4	Zhang Zhenyuan	4	9	44%	(Ep. 1, 3, 8, 12)
5	Li Yunrui	3	9	33%	(Ep. 2, 4, 12)
6	Cheng Lei	2	2	100%	(Ep. 7, 8)
6	Meng Ziyi	2	7	29%	(Ep. 11, 12)
6	Sha Yi	2	12	17%	(Ep. 5, 12)
9	Chen Lijun	1	1	100%	(Ep. 9)
9	Ding Chengxin	1	1	100%	(Ep. 1)
9	Fiona Sit	1	1	100%	(Ep. 6)
9	He Junlin	1	1	100%	(Ep. 1)
9	Liu Xiening	1	2	50%	(Ep. 12)
9	Liu Yaowen	1	1	100%	(Ep. 1)
9	Ma Jiaqi	1	1	100%	(Ep. 1)
9	Miao Miao	1	1	100%	(Ep. 4)
9	Ni Hongjie	1	1	100%	(Ep. 4)
9	Peng Yuchang	1	1	100%	(Ep. 7)
9	Shen Yujie	1	1	100%	(Ep. 4)
9	Song Yaxuan	1	1	100%	(Ep. 1)
9	Tang Jiuzhou	1	1	100%	(Ep. 6)
9	Tian Jiarui	1	1	100%	(Ep. 9)
9	Wei Daxun	1	1	100%	(Ep. 3)
9	Xu Yiyang	1	1	100%	(Ep. 3)
9	Yan Haoxiang	1	1	100%	(Ep. 1)
9	Zhai Zilu	1	2	50%	(Ep. 6)
9	Zhang Ruonan	1	2	50%	(Ep. 12)
9	Zhou Keyu	1	1	100%	(Ep. 8)
29	Alina Zhang	0	1	0%	N/A
29	Chen Linong	0	1	0%	N/A
29	Chen Zheyuan	0	1	0%	N/A
29	Curley G	0	1	0%	N/A
29	Hu Ke	0	1	0%	N/A
29	Huang Xinchun	0	2	0%	N/A
29	Lai Weiming	0	1	0%	N/A
29	Lars Huang	0	1	0%	N/A
29	Liu Yuxin	0	1	0%	N/A
29	Mao Xiaotong	0	1	0%	N/A
29	Sun Qian	0	1	0%	N/A
29	Wang Hongyi	0	1	0%	N/A
29	Xu Zhisheng	0	1	0%	N/A
29	Yang Di	0	1	0%	N/A
29	Yu Yang	0	2	0%	N/A
29	Zhang Kangle	0	1	0%	N/A
29	Zhang Weili	0	1	0%	N/A
29	Zhou Jieqiong	0	1	0%	N/A
29	Zhou Yiran	0	1	0%	N/A
