= List of Keep Running cast members =

The original members of Running Man are Deng Chao, Angelababy, Li Chen, Chen He, Zheng Kai, Wong Cho-lam, and Wang Baoqiang.

After season 1, Wang Baoqiang left the program to focus on his career but returned on season 3, episode 10 as a guest.

In season 2, Bao Bei'er replaced Wang Baoqiang but left at the end of the season as he was cast in Stephen Chow's Journey to the West II.

Singer Lu Han then replaced Bao Bei'er from season 3 to season 6.

Dilraba Dilmurat replaced Angelababy in season 5 due to Angelababy's pregnancy. Due to scheduling conflicts, Dilraba left before season 6.

For season 7, Deng Chao, Chen He, and Lu Han left due to scheduling conflicts, while Wong Cho-Lam left to focus on his family. Lucas from South Korean boy group NCT and its Chinese unit WayV, Song Yuqi from South Korean girl group I-dle, and actors Zhu Yawen and Wang Yanlin replaced them in the new season.

For season 8, Zhu Yawen and Wang Yanlin left due to scheduling conflicts. Singer Cai Xukun, actor/comedian Guo Qilin, and actor Sha Yi joined as new members and replaced them. Lucas and Song Yuqi, who are both based in South Korea, were absent for the whole season due to COVID-19 pandemic and travel restrictions.

For the first Yellow River special season, Lucas and Yuqi were again absent. Cai Xukun only participated in episodes 1-2 due to scheduling conflicts, while Guo Qilin only participated in episodes 3-4 due to scheduling conflicts. Zheng Kai was absent from episodes 1-2 due to the birth of his daughter.

For Season 9, Guo Qilin left the cast due to scheduling conflicts while Lucas and Yuqi rejoined the cast. Yuqi was absent from the first few episodes due to quarantine restrictions.

For Season 10, it was announced that due to scheduling conflicts, Lucas would not be involved in filming, while Yuqi left to focus on her career. Actress Bai Lu, who joined during the second Yellow River special season, and singer Zhou Shen joined the cast. Meanwhile, Cai Xukun returned after a temporary hiatus in the second Yellow River season. Zheng Kai was absent for the second half of the season, starting from episode 7, due to the birth of his second child.

For the Common Prosperity special season, Cai Xukun only participated in the first two journeys, which spanned the first two-and-a-half episodes. Zhou Shen only participated in the first three journeys, which spanned episodes 1-4.

For Season 11, it was announced that due to his upcoming tour, Cai Xukun would not be participating. Yuqi rejoined the cast, and Fan Chengcheng from the Chinese boy group NEXT also joined as a new cast member.

For the Nature special season, it was announced that Angelababy would not be participating, while Zhang Zhenyuan from the Chinese boy group TNT joined as a new cast member. This member setup was retained in Season 12.

During the Ancient Tea Horse Road special season, both Yuqi and Zhou Shen only appeared in episodes 6-8 due to scheduling conflicts. Fan Chengcheng also did not participate in this season, as he was filming a television show at the time.

For Season 13, Li Chen, Zheng Kai, Yuqi, Sha Yi, Bai Lu, Zhou Shen, Fan Chengcheng and Zhang Zhenyuan reunited and were joined by Meng Ziyi and Li Yunrui as Running Friends. The newest cast members had been guests during the previous Tea Horse Road Season and starred in the Chinese drama Blossom.

For The Heavenly Road special season, Zhou Shen and Meng Ziyi were unable to participate due to schedule conflicts.

For Season 14, Meng Ziyi and Li Yunrui were promoted to full cast members. Zhou Shen was unable to participate due to his tour. Yuqi was absent due to recovery from a recent head injury and other schedule conflicts.

== Timeline ==
Member	Running Man China				Keep Running																	
Member	S1 10/2014	S2 04/2015	S3 10/2015	S4 04/2016	S5 04/2017	S5 06/2017	S6 2018	S7 2019	S8 2020	YR1 2020	S9 2021	YR2 2021	S10 2022	LBaBL 2022	S11 2023	Nat. 2023	S12 2024	Tea 2024	S13 2025	Road 2025	S14 2026	GBA 2026
Deng Chao																						
Angelababy																						
Li Chen																						
Chen He																						
Zheng Kai																						
Wong Cho-lam																						
Wang Baoqiang																						
Bao Bei'er																						
Lu Han																						
Dilraba Dilmurat																						
Zhu Yawen																						
Wang Yanlin																						
Lucas																						
Yuqi																						
Sha Yi																						
Cai Xukun																						
Guo Qilin																						
Bai Lu																						
Zhou Shen																						
Fan Chengcheng																						
Zhang Zhenyuan																						
Meng Ziyi																						
Li Yunrui																						

== Cast ==
=== Current cast ===
Name	Age	Nickname(s)	Theme Song(s)	Duration	Notes	Nationality
Li Chen	47	Big Black Bull (大黑牛); Music Black Hole (音乐黑洞)	The Imperial March, by John Williams	S1 – present	The leader since season 7. Strongest member of the team. Whole cast is afraid of his strength in the name tag ripping game.	China
Zheng Kai	40	Romantic Prince (护花使者); The Leopard (小猎豹)	I Believe I Can Fly, by R. Kelly	S1 – present	One of the fastest runners. Usually very cool/calm or hot/raging.	China
Yuqi	27	Brother Yuqi (雨琦弟弟); Fitness Queen (体力王者)	Just the way you are, by Bruno Mars; Latata, by (G)I-dle	S7, S9, YR2, S11-Present	Joined the new cast for season 7, teamed up with Angelababy as the two female members. Missed season 14 due to injury.	China
Sha Yi	48	Father Sha (沙爹); Lao Sha (老沙)		S8 – present		China
Bai Lu	32	Lu Lu (鹿鹿); Sister Lu (鹿姐)		YR2 - Present	Joined since Yellow River 2, known for her iconic laughter.	China
Fan Chengcheng	26	Chengcheng (丞丞)		S11 - Present	Joined since season 11, known for his crafty schemes and tricks. Missed TATHRS due to work conflicts.	China
Zhang Zhenyuan	23			Eco - Present	Joined since Nature season, known for expansive music knowledge and name tag battle skills. Youngest in the current cast.	China
Meng Ziyi	30	Sister Meng (孟姐)		S13 - Present	Joined since season 13, known for causing funny scenes while remaining cute. Missed THR due to work conflicts.	China
Li Yunrui	30	Xiao Lin (小林)		S13 - Present	Joined since season 13, known for his athleticism and mental quickness.	China

=== Former cast ===
Name	Age	Nickname(s)	Theme Song(s)	Duration	Notes	Nationality
Wang Baoqiang	42	Shaolin Baoqiang (少林宝强); Chinese Key Master (中华锁王)	Tall in the Saddle, by George Lam	Season 1	Couldn't participate in the second season due to scheduling conflicts.	China
Bao Bei'er	42	The Bald (光头强); Little Bald Donkey; Bowling Ball (保龄球); Soy Egg (卤蛋)	none	Season 2	Left the crew due to being cast in Stephen Chow's Journey to the West II.	China
Dilraba Dilmurat	34	Little Di (小迪); Fat Di (胖迪); Captain Tuo (坨队长); DiliRouba (迪丽肉巴); Tone Deaf (音痴); Voice Break Goddess (女破音) Reba (热巴) Rules black hole (规则黑洞）Game black hole (游戏黑洞）	Your Song, by Luhan; Hangover, by Taio Cruz	Season 5	Due to scheduling conflicts, Dilraba will not be returning for Season 6.	China
Deng Chao	47	Captain Deng (邓队长); Captain Superman (邓感超人); Dance King (舞王超)	La Song, by Rain	Season 1 - Season 6	The leader from season 1 to season 6. Usually wins the name-tag ripping. Will not participate in season 7 due to scheduling conflicts.	China
Chen He	40	Genius (天才); Pig (猪); The Brain (最强大脑)	I Got You (I Feel Good), by James Brown	Season 1 - Season 6	Always either very perceptive or very oblivious. Often teased about his flaws like his weight and teeth. Will not participate in season 7 due to scheduling conflicts.	China
Wong Cho-lam	46	Grab-Chance King (捡漏王); Running Man (奔跑侠); Game Black Hole (游戏黑洞)	In the Sentimental Past, by Leslie Cheung	Season 1 - Season 6	Usually thought of as the weakest and funniest. Often teased about his height. Will not participate in season 7 to focus on his family.	Hong Kong
Lu Han	36	Little Deer (小鹿); Silly Roe Deer (傻狍子)	That Good Good, by Lu Han; Football Gang, by Lu Han; Medals by Lu Han; Who's gonna catch me when I fall, by Lu Han	Season 3 - Season 6	Replaced Bao Bei'er from season 3 onwards. Often perceived as the "young" one compared to Deng Chao and Li Chen. Will not participate in season 7 due to scheduling conflicts.	China
Zhu Yawen	42	Lady Killer (师奶杀手); Husky (哈士奇)	Stupid Cupid, by Connie Francis	Season 7	Joined the new cast for season 7.	China
Wang Yanlin	37	King of Garbage (垃圾王中王)	天堂, by Tengger; Oynasun, by Shahrizoda	Season 7	Joined for season 7. Lest due to conflicting schedules.	China
Guo Qilin				Season 8 – Yellow River season 1		China
Angelababy	37	Scream Goddess (高音女王); East BB (Baby); Off-key Queen (跑调女王); Wisdom Queen (智慧女王） Music Black Hole (音乐黑洞）	Baby, by Justin Bieber; Can't Take My Eyes Off You, by Frankie Valli; Fantastic Baby, by BIGBANG	Season 1 to 4, Season 5 Episode 8 – Season 11	The only female member for 6 seasons. Left the cast at the end of Season 4 due to pregnancy. Angelababy came back for the show second half of season 5 on June 2, 2017 during Episode 8.	China
Cai Xukun	28			Season 8 – Let's Build a Better Life		China
Lucas	27	Jumping Youngster (跳跳少年); Monkey Xi (猴嘻嘻); Brother Chicken (鸡哥); Nine Piece Chicken (九条鸡)	Take Off, by WayV; Regular, by WayV; Beat It, by Michael Jackson	Season 7, Season 9	Second youngest cast, Joined the new cast for season 7, due to covid travel restriction, he didn't continue be on the show.	Hong Kong
Zhou Shen	34	Shen-Shen (深深); High-Pitch Vocal King (高音之王); Little Giant (小巨人)		S10 - S13	Joined since season 10, known for his critical thinking skills on complex activities. Missed THR and season 14 due to work conflicts, Left before the upcoming special season, Greater Bay Area.	China

== Relationships ==
=== Current relationships ===
Members	Relation / Nickname	Details
Li Chen, Zheng Kai	Bull-Leopard combination/brothers	These two are known as Bull and Leopard because of their strength and speed respectively.
Zheng Kai, Song Yuqi	139 Club (139组合)	After Yuqi joined the show, she is known to have beat Zheng Kai in all kinds of game which embarrasses him and make him weak. For example, in season 7, episode 2, members were given the weightlifting mission. Yuqi ended up with a score of lifting 139kg, while Zheng Kai had a score of 138kg and that is how the club was formed. They have a love-hate relationship. In season 9 when Yuqi has returned, Zheng Kai still can't beat her as expected which he said is a curse. Yuqi is forever above Zheng Kai.
Zheng Kai, Zhang Zhenyuan	"Yang Yang De Yi" Duo (羊羊得亿组合)	A playful wordplay on the idiom Yang Yang De Yi (洋洋得意), which means "immensely proud" or "jubilant." Since Zhang Zhenyuan is a member of the idol group Teens in Times (时代少年团)—whose fandom culture heavily incorporates sheep imagery—and Zheng Kai is the veteran "Leopard," they merged their variety identities to form a team name that sounds like welcoming massive wealth and good fortune.
Li Chen, Song Yuqi	Beijing Uncle and Niece (北京叔侄组合)	Yuqi has been calling Li Chen "uncle" due to his age and since both are born in Beijing, the group was formed. They are one of the strongest teams in the show. When these two team up, they always win.
Song Yuqi, Zhang Zhenyuan	Idol Siblings (爱豆偶像组合)	Both are currently active and part of idol groups, and have the best dance and music skills.
Bai Lu, Song Yuqi	923 Sisters (923姐妹)	Both share a birthday 09/23, just different years. Always having each other's backs and hyping each other in every game.
Bai Lu, Fan Chengcheng	White Rice Duo (大白米饭组合)	Nickname comes from playing a pun on their last names: Bai (白) + Fan (范) = BaiFan(白范) = White Rice (白饭). Both are the showstealers and dramatic siblings, always roasting and bickering with each other, either being the masterminds or the schemers.
Bai Lu, Sha Yi	Drama Dad & Daughter (戏剧父女 / 戏精父女)	Sha Yi is an experienced veteran actor who plays up a dramatic, easily stressed "older dad" persona, and Bai Lu matches his theatrical facial expressions, dramatic gasps, and chaotic energy, the show frequently frames them as a theatrical father-daughter pair.
Fan Chengcheng, Zhang Zhenyuan	Post-00s Brothers (00后组合)	Both are the two youngest and most energetic in many intense physical challenges.
Meng Ziyi, Li Yunrui	Cloud Mystery Duo (云梦组合); Captivation Duo (昀牵孟绕); Zhao Zhao Mo Mo (昭昭墨墨)	Nicknames comes from playing a pun on their real names or drama character names. Yun(昀) + Meng(孟) = Yunmeng(昀孟) = Cloud Mystery (云梦). Yun Qian Meng Rao (昀牵孟绕) is a romantic homophonic play on words meaning "captivating lingering dreams" (hun qian meng rao 魂牵梦绕). Zhao Zhao Mo Mo (昭昭墨墨) is a combination of their Blossom characters' names.
Li Yunrui, Zhang Zhenyuan	Truth Above All (“真李”至上)	Nickname comes from playing a pun on the idiom Zhenli Zhishang (真理至上) with their names. They are often considered the ultimate supreme pair, known for their high-speed athletic synergy and youthful energy.

=== Former relationships ===
Members	Relation	Details
Wang Baoqiang, Wong Cho-lam	Royal Brothers; Bao-Lam Brothers	Because the two of them are of similar height, they were close to each other from the beginning of the series.
Zheng Kai, Wang Baoqiang	Zheng-Wang Combination	During Episode 4, they formed a team to manufacture a cardboard boat. The surnames of Zheng Kai and Wang Baoqiang were combined to create the team name. The name was a homophonic pun of "zhen-wang" (perished) and they were made fun of, especially after theirs became the only boat that sank. The relationship name appears in Episode 9. In Episode 10 of the 3rd season, the group appears again, now with Wong Cho-lam and a different name: "bao-zheng-bu-wang" (guaranteed not to perish).
Dilraba Dilmurat, Lu Han	Lu-Di Combination	Luhan and Dilireba were paired up together in many episodes in season 5 and they are about the same age. They had some flirtatious moments like during Episode 3 when they had a heart rate game and Luhan pulled Dilireba's hair back and he leaned close to her face to make her heart rate faster. In Episode 8, Luhan blew a kiss to Dilireba twice.
Dilraba Dilmurat, Angelababy	Attractive Sisters	After Angelababy had returned from her hiatus as a special guest to signify her return on season 5 episode 8, she was temporarily paired up with Dilireba, to jokingly spite the rest of the male members for being unattractive and being unwelcoming.
Chen He, Dilraba Dilmurat	Ba-He Combination	Ever since the beginning of the show, Chen He has been known to be the member that eats the most. Also, since Dilireba arrived, she has known to always be eating throughout the episodes in season 5, and always taking out junk food from random places. In episode 9 of season 5, they, along with Li Chen, were paired up by chance to eat seafood together. Surprisingly, although they did not have the most people in their group, they finished the most food within the given time.
Deng Chao, Chen He	Chao He Union; Sky Ba Move Ba Tua	In Episode 10, the two had fun acting as dummies and the subtitles referred to them as the dummy brothers. In Episode 4 of the 3rd season, they grouped again and create their catchphrase, Sky Ba Move Ba Tua (in pinyin, "tian-ba-dong-ba-tua"). In one episode, "pao" was tacked on to the end for Luhan, because it meant "deer" and so did "lu". This slogan later appears several times in the later episodes of the show.
Li Chen, Chen He	Mother and Child; Chen-He Combination; Li-Chen Combination	Since the fight before Episode 4, Chen He often succumbed to the rules set by Li Chen. Though he occasionally disobeys him, he still follows obediently along to Li Chen's instructions. Li Chen comes help Chen He a lot, even though he tends to "betray" Li Chen a lot, ripping off his name tag and such.
Lu Han, Zheng Kai	Leopard Deer Combination	In Episode 5 of Season 3, the two were in the same team. Lu Han's nickname is little deer (鹿, or Lu, is his surname and can also mean deer) and Zheng Kai's nickname is leopard (because of his speed), ergo "Leopard Deer".
Deng Chao, Lu Han	Father and Son	At the beginning of season 4, Deng Chao asked if he was allowed to help Luhan in the game they were playing. Ever since then, Luhan has called Deng Chao his father many times and vice versa (in and outside of the show). This might be partially because Luhan is the youngest among them and Deng Chao the second oldest of the cast.
Angelababy, Lu Han	Siblings; LuBaby	On the final episode of season 4, Angelababy and Luhan paired up together and would not betray each other, even referring to themselves as siblings in an episode. As a team, they managed to rip the name tag off of Blackie Chen, who is very strong, which shocked and impressed everyone. Angelababy was sad he was eliminated because she would have protected him until the end of the game.
Angelababy, Zheng Kai	Friday Couple; Friday Partner; Cuckoo Couple; White and Green Snake sisters Cuckoo Team Cuckoo Best Friends	Inspired by the Monday Couple on SBS Running Man, the two became known as the Friday Couple. They are the official loveline of the show. Whenever there are no teams, they ally. When Angelababy is in danger, Zheng Kai always protects and saves her. Even though Angelababy is married, they are usually in one team. After they both have their own partners in real life, they have changed from couple to best friends. They are one of the most compatible pairs in the show because when these two are together, they usually win. They have one of the best tacit understanding. They are also perfectly in sync with each other.
Li Chen, Angelababy	Music Black Hole Siblings ChenBaby Siblings	These two are known as Music Black hole of the show as they are the only ones who can't sing. Whenever certain episodes are based on singing themes, both of them are at huge disadvantages. They both have a brother-sister relationship and they take care of each other. They also have one of the best tacit understandings, too.
Lucas, Wang Yanlin	Double Egg group	In the opening of season 7, episode 1, Lucas mistaken Yanlin's surname as "Wong". The two went head to head in a push-up battle and the group was eventually formed by the two members.
Lucas, Angelababy	Hong Kong Siblings Big Eyes Siblings Visual Siblings	Lucas and Angelababy are both from Hong Kong. They both have big eyes. They are the Visual Siblings of the show. They both have a sister-brother relationship.
Lucas, Song Yuqi	XuQi Siblings， LuQi couple	Lucas and Yuqi are both born in 1999 and they are the youngest members in season 7. They are also shipped together because of their appearances. They have one of the best tacit understandings.
Zhu Yawen, Wang Yanlin	Yalin Brothers	In the early episodes of season 7, Yuqi has always mistaken the both of them, calling them "Yalin", the combination of "Ya" from Yawen and "Lin" from Yanlin.
Li Chen, Zhu Yawen	Old Red Sunshine	In season 7, episode 10, Li Chen and Zhu Yawen, both older members, were grouped together for the "Running Man Singing Festival". They were wearing bright red shirts, therefore, Zheng Kai labeled them as "Old Red Sunshine" (夕阳红组合). They are the oldest members of the group. Yawen said this team is a combination of intelligence and strength, which is him and Li Chen respectively.
Bai Lu, Zhou Shen	The Brainiac Duo	Whenever a spy-themed episode or mind-game challenge arises, these two frequently team up or suspect each other, creating intense but hilarious deductive back-and-forths.

=== Other relationships ===
List of common cast and guest partner names

Members	Relation / Nickname	Details
Wei Daxun, Bai Lu, Zhou Shen	Feed White Congee Trio (喂白粥组合)	When guest star Wei Daxun joined them, their chaotic name-blending logic resulted in a name that sounds exactly like "feeding someone plain white rice porridge," much to the cast's amusement
Fan Chengcheng, Zhang Ruonan	Old Stories of the South (丞楠旧事)	Frequent partners when guest Zhang Ruonan joins. A beautiful literary play on words (Chengnan Jiushi) using their names. Always a hilarious and persevering duo.
Sha Yi, Wang Churan	Surrounded by Chu (沙楚重围)	A pun on the famous historical idiom "surrounded by Chu forces on all sides" (Sichu Chongwei), perfectly capturing Sha Yi's perpetually panicked variety state whenever he gets trapped in games and Wang Churan's hopeful pleas.
Zhou Shen, Zhang Liangying	Bu Yao Shen Zhang (不要深张)	A brilliant homophonic pun to sound like Bu Yao Shen Zhang—a Chinese idiom meaning "keep a low profile" or "don't make a scene." Ironically, as two of China's most powerful, high-pitched vocalists, their presence on any team is anything but low-profile.
