= Wu Yi (singer) =

Chinese singer

Wu Yi (Chinese: 武艺; born November 3, 1990), also known as Philip Wu and Philip Lau, is a Chinese pop singer who was the second runner-up of Super Boy, a singing talent show of Hunan TV in 2010. He is also the champion and second runner-up in Canadian and North American area of the "Karaoke King" competition in 2009.

== Songs ==
Song	Information
Rainy Day (Chinese: 下雨天)	Released 20 September 2010 His first song
Extension line of love (Chinese: 爱情延长线)	Released 11 August 2011 Episode of the cyberspace drama " Chinese gossip girl"
Tidal movement (Chinese: 潮流运动)	Released 14 June 2011 (ft. Liu Xin 刘心 and Li Wei 李炜)
Gelivable youth (Chinese: 给力青春)	Released 2011
Seek Moon (Chinese: 问月)	Released early 2012 Episode of Chinese drama "Phoenix Totem 凰图腾"
Everyday Valentine (Chinese: 天天情人节)	Released: February 2012 (ft. Fu Mengni 付梦妮)
Qiu Bite's Love (Chinese: 见习爱)	Released 2012
Make a Wish (Chinese: 许愿)	Released 2012 Main song in his first album: Cupid's Love
A Little Sweet (Chinese: 微甜)	Released 2012
Only You (Chinese: 只有你们)	Released 2012 Dedicated to his fans

== Filmography ==
=== TV drama ===
Time	Name	Role
2011	Chinese gossip girl	Dai Zhu
2011	Summer sweetheart	Dai Zhu

=== Film ===
Time	Name	Role
2011	在一起	Zheng Yu
2012	Love on that Day	
2013	Murcielago	
2016	The Roommate	
2016	Ancient Tomb Girlfriend	
2019	Demon List	

== Happy Boy ==
Lau's attendance experience at the 2010 Hunan TV Super Boy is listed below.

Finale	Song
Mass election	可惜不是你
Changsha 35/50	可惜不是你
Changsha 25/35, first	如果云知道、雨天
Changsha 25/35, second	有人为你偷偷在哭、我还想她
Nationwide 60/300	何必在一起、分开以后
Nationwide 30/61	怎么忍心放开手、曹操
Nationwide 20/30	会呼吸的痛、猜不透
Nationwide 12/20, first	可惜不是你
Nationwide 12/20, second	如果云知道、木乃伊
Nationwide 10/12	朋友别哭、当你孤单你会想起谁
Nationwide 8/10	期待你的爱、灰色空间
Nationwide 7/8	Bleeding Love、一千年以后
Nationwide 6/7	栀子花开、我是个SOSO的男生
Nationwide 5/6	Boys、你是我的眼
Nationwide 4/5	刀剑如梦、蜗牛、Baby
Nationwide 3/4	粉末、九百九十九朵玫瑰、亲爱的小孩
Final night	如果云知道、爱如潮水、红旗飘飘，流星
