= Bai Yu =

Bai Yu may refer to:

- Bai Yu (actor) (白宇; born 1990), Chinese actor
- Bai Yu (actress) (白羽), Chinese producer, actress, and director
