= Ao Ruipeng =

Chinese actor (born 1995)

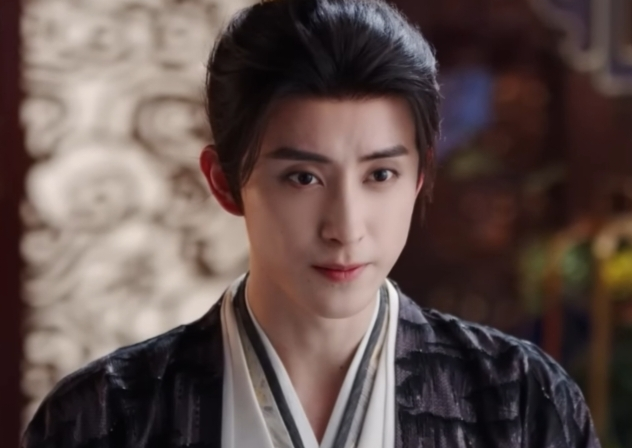
- Ao for the drama Coroner's Diary
- Born: October 6, 1995 (age 30); Chongqing, China
- Education: Chengdu Art Professional College
- Occupation: Actor
- Years active: 2019–present
- Agent: Jiashang Media
- Height: 193 cm (6 ft 4 in)

Chinese name
- Simplified Chinese: 敖瑞鹏
- Hanyu Pinyin: Áo Ruìpéng

Ao Ruipeng (Chinese: 敖瑞鹏, born October 6, 1995), is a Chinese actor. He gained popularity for his roles in The Blood of Youth (2022) and Moonlight Mystique (2025). He is also well known for his lead roles in Wrong Carriage, Right Groom (2023) and Coroner's Diary (2025).

== Discography ==
=== Soundtrack appearances ===
Title	Year	Peak chart positions	Album
Title	Year	CHN	Album
2023	"Seeing Fate" (看见缘分) (with Qi Yandi)	—	Love is Written in the Stars OST
2023	"Happy Together" (共逍遥) with (Deng Chaoyuan)	—	Wanru's Journey OST
2025	"Do Not Miss" (不要想念) (with Bai Lu)	87	Moonlight Mystique OST
2025	"Return" (归来)	—	Love Never Fails OST
2025	"This Love" (此爱)	67	Coroner's Diary OST

== Filmography ==
=== Television series ===
Year	Title		Role	Ref.
Year	English	Original	Role	Ref.
2019	Arg Life 2	生活对我下手了 第二季	Ao Ruipeng	
2020	Beautiful Time with You	时光与你都很甜	Zhang Haotian	
2020	Poisoned Love	恋爱吧，食梦君！	Ye Meng	
2021	Unusual Idol Love	新人类男友会漏电	Hu Li	
2021	Be Yourself	机智的上半场	Ma Yiran	
2021	A Female Student Arrives at the Imperial College	国子监来了个女弟子	Yan Yan	
2022	The Blood of Youth	少年歌行	Lei Wujie	
2023	Love Is Written in the Stars	看见缘分的少女	Wei Qi	
2023	Wanru's Journey	少年江湖	Murong Chong	
2023	Wrong Carriage Right Groom	花轿喜事	Qi Tianlei	
2024	As Beautiful as You	你比星光美丽	Qin Li	
2024	Hero Is Back	镇魂街之热血再燃	Cao Yanbing	
2025	Moonlight Mystique	白月梵星	Fan Yue	
2025	Love Never Fails	落花时节又逢君	Kun Lun / Bai Ling	
2025	The Seven Relics of Ill Omen	七根心简	Yi Wansan / Jiang Zhao	
2025	Coroner's Diary	朝雪录	Yan Chi	
2026	Pull Strings	师兄太稳健	Li Changshou	
TBA	Now or Never	一点浩然气	Chen Yi	
TBA	My Queen, My Rules	不二之臣	Cen Sen	
TBA	The Blood of Youth 2	少年歌行之南明离火	Lei Wujie	
TBA	Wild Bloom	狂花	President Cen	
TBA	Wan Hua Sin	万花世界		
TBA	Cuo Shi Lu	错世录	Wei Jie	

== Awards and nominations ==
Year	Award	Category	Nominee(s)/Work(s)	Result	Ref.
2024	iQIYI Scream Night	Potential Actor of the Year	Ao Ruipeng	Won	
2025	iQIYI Scream Night	Expressive Actor of the Year	Ao Ruipeng	Won	
