= Zhejiang Radio and Television Group =

Chinese broadcasting company

Zhejiang Radio and Television Group 浙江广播电视集团
- Type: free-to-air, Satellite television, radio
- Industry: Media and Entertainment
- Founded: June 2001
- Headquarters: Hangzhou, Zhejiang, China
- Area served: China and abroad
- Owner: Zhejiang Provincial People's Government
- Website: Official Site

Zhejiang Media Group, formerly known as Zhejiang Radio and Television Group (ZRTG) (Chinese: 浙江广播电视集团; pinyin: Zhèjiāng Guǎngbò Diànshì jítuán), is China's fourth-biggest television network after China Central Television (CCTV), Hunan Broadcasting System (HBS), and Jiangsu Broadcasting Corporation (JSBC). The television network is owned by the Zhejiang Provincial People's Government. The network is based in Hangzhou in Zhejiang.

== History ==
Before the establishment of Zhejiang Radio and Television Group the local television stations first aired in Hangzhou and northern Zhejiang in the 1960s. ZRTG was established on 8 November 2001 to compete with other major Television networks and expanded its network through nationwide satellite television on 1994.

== Television channels ==
- ZTV-1
- ZTV-2
- ZTV-3
- ZTV-4
- ZTV-6
- ZTV-7
- ZTV-8
- ZTV World

== Radio stations ==
- The voice of Zhejiang (FM88 FM101.6 AM810)
- Economic radio (FM95)
- Traffic radio (FM 93)
- Music radio (FM96.8)
- Livelihood FM 99.6
- Hostess Radio (FM104.5 AM603)
- City Radio (FM 107)
- News Radio (FM98.8 AM1530)

== Production ==
ZRTG have broadcast notable programming such as The Voice of China, often referred to as the Chinese version of the Dutch's reality talent show The Voice of Holland.

- The Voice of China
- Chinese Dream Show
- Splash!
- Do You Remember
- Fall in Love
- My Oscar
- Break Away
- Mr. Zhou Live Show
- Star Know My Heart
