= Are You Lonesome Tonight? (disambiguation) =

"Are You Lonesome Tonight?" is a 1926 song by Lou Handman and Roy Turk, notably recorded by Elvis Presley.

Are You Lonesome Tonight may also refer to:

- Are You Lonesome Tonight? (play), a 1982 play by Pamela Van Amstel about an Elvis-obsessed family, featuring Simon Bowman in 1983
- Are You Lonesome Tonight? (musical), a 1985 musical play by Alan Bleasdale about Presley
- Are You Lonesome Tonight? (1992 film), a television film directed by E. W. Swackhamer, starring Jane Seymour and Parker Stevenson
- Are You Lonesome Tonight? (film), a 2021 Chinese film directed by Wen Shipei, starring Eddie Peng and Sylvia Chang
