= Only for Love (TV series) =

- Promotional poster
- Also known as
- Simplified Chinese: 以爱为营
- Genre: Romance, Urban
- Based on: Cuo Liao by Qiaoyao
- Screenplay by: Yang Qianzi
- Directed by: Guo Hu
- Starring: Bai Lu; Dylan Wang; Wei Zheming
- Country of origin: China
- Original language: Mandarin
- No. of seasons: 1
- No. of episodes: 36

Production
- Running time: 45 minutes
- Production company: Dongyang Liehuo

Original release
- Network: Hunan Television; Mango Television
- Release: 3 November – 29 November 2023

Only for Love (Chinese: 以爱为营; pinyin: Yǐ ài wéi yíng) is a 2023 Chinese urban romance television series adapted from the Jinjiang Literature City web novel Cuo Liao (Chinese: 错撩) by Qiaoyao. It was directed by Guo Hu, written by Yang Qianzi, and stars Bai Lu, Dylan Wang, Wei Zheming and Shen Yujie in the leading roles. Filming officially began on 22 November 2022. It premiered on 3 November 2023 and concluded on 29 November 2023.

== Synopsis ==
A financial reporter and a reserved CEO unexpectedly fall in love while navigating the world of business. What starts with misunderstandings slowly blossoms into a heartfelt romance built on trust, growth, and second chances.

== Cast ==
=== Main cast ===
| Actor | Role | Description |
|---|---|---|
| Bai Lu | Zheng Shuyi | A reporter at Finance World. Intelligent, attractive, and highly capable. Believing Shi Yan to be Qin Lezhi's maternal uncle, she deliberately approaches him to get revenge on her ex-boyfriend Yue Xingzhou and his new girlfriend Qin Lezhi by becoming their "little aunt-in-law", only to later discover she had mistaken his identity. Her parents are Zheng Su and Wang Meiru. Her colleagues include her close friend Kong Nan and her rival Xu Yuling. |
| Dylan Wang | Shi Yan | Elusive president of Mingyu Yunchuang. A workaholic who finds himself increasingly attracted to Shuyi despite doubting her intentions. His father is Mingyu chairman Shi Wenguang, his elder sister is singer Song Lelan (Shi Huaiman), and Qin Shiyue is his niece. His driver, Fan Lei, is Qin Lezhi's uncle. |
| Wei Zheming | Yu You | Invited back to China as a strategic consultant for Guan Group while also serving as an associate professor. Zheng Shuyi's blind date. Former classmate and colleague of Bruce. At Shi Yan's request, he invites Bruce to join Lean Technology's research and development team. He develops feelings for Qin Shiyue. |
| Shen Yujie | Qin Shiyue | Daughter of Mingyu Group general manager Qin Xiaoming and singer Song Lelan (Shi Huaiman). Previously worked with Zheng Shuyi at Finance World. She has a crush on Yu You and frequently attends his lectures. |
| Liu Dongqin | Guan Ji | Shi Yan's close friend, Guan Xiangcheng's son, and Bi Ruoshan's love interest. |
| Jiang Peiyao | Bi Ruoshan | Zheng Shuyi's best friend. A free-spirited, warm and cheerful young woman who has feelings for Guan Ji. |
| Nie Yuan | Guan Xiangcheng | Guan Ji's father and a prominent figure in the financial industry. A divorced equestrian enthusiast who pursues Tang Yi. At Shi Yan's request, he arranges for Qin Shiyue to intern at Finance World through his friend Tang Yi. He first met Tang Yi during an interview years earlier, and the two eventually marry. |
| Liu Minghao | Chen Sheng | Shi Yan's secretary. He has a crush on Kong Nan. |
| Fan Jingwen | Situ Yi | A beauty livestream host, Zheng Shuyi's university classmate, and Yue Xingzhou's former romantic interest. |
| Huang Xiao | Qian Yucheng | Qin Shiyue's classmate who develops feelings for her. |
| Bai Zixuan | Bruce | An expert in millimetre-wave communications and Yu You's former classmate and colleague. Despite receiving offers from many companies, he prefers academic research and enjoys challenges and innovation. Introduced to Shi Yan through Yu You, he joins Lean Technology's R&D project before later being recruited by Yi Yang as a partner at Dark Horse Technology. |
| Zhou Keyu | Yi Yang | A chip prodigy and CEO of Dark Horse Technology. He develops feelings for Zheng Shuyi. |
| Yang Lin | Chen Kang | Head of Lean Technology. Facing funding difficulties for the company's R&D team, he plans a merger with Lieying before accepting Shi Yan's proposal to partner with Mingyu Yunchuang. |
| Lu Zhong | Professor Li Xuecai | A professor and one of the speakers at the Fucheng Chip Conference. He admires Chen Kang and later accepts Shi Yan's invitation to lead his laboratory team in supporting Lean Technology's research and development. |
| Wang Yonghui | President Li | The executive responsible for merger negotiations between Lieying and Lean Technology. |
| Wei Wei | Jiang Shaoyuan | President of the battery manufacturer Zhanlan. |
| Liu Xiening | Bei Lin | Shi Yan's former girlfriend and a glamorous celebrity. Their relationship ended because Shi Yan devoted himself to his career. |

=== Supporting cast ===
- Dong Xuan as Song Lelan (Shi Huaiman)
- Cheng Shiyu as Yu You's father
- Kong Lianshun as Fan Lei
- Yang Mingna as Wang Meiru
- Shi Yu as Zheng Su
- Lü Chengjue as Yue Xingzhou
- Zheng Shuhuan as Qin Lezhi
- Ma Li as Chen Jie
- Li Chang as Chen Yueding
- Sun Yue as Gu Zinian
- Wu Lin as Dazhuang
- Zhou Luoyi as Lily

==== Mingyu Corporation ====
- Wang Yaoqing as Qin Xiaoming, the company's general manager, Song Lelan (Shi Huaiman)'s husband, and Qin Shiyue's father
- Kou Zhenhai as Shi Wenguang, the company's chairman
- Yao Yiqi as Qiu Fu, the company's director
- Lan Cheng as President Zhang, a company veteran
- Ma Jun as President Tian, a company veteran

==== Juhe Battery Partners ====
- Zhu Tingbei as Cheng Xing
- Xiong Yifan as Hao Wangshu

==== Finance World ====
- Wang Wei as Kong Nan, a reporter
- An Yuexi as Xu Yuling, a reporter
- Zeng Li as Tang Yi, the editor-in-chief, Zheng Shuyi's supervisor and close friend. She met Guan Xiangcheng during an interview, and they later married. Zheng Shuyi served as a bridesmaid at their wedding.
- Duan Xingyu as Cheng Bei'er, an intern learning under Xu Yuling. She has an excellent academic record, has won awards, and has an aunt who works at Mingyu Corporation.
- Sun Ao as Hu Qinghua, a multimedia editorial intern. He has a crush on Cheng Beier and tries to befriend Zheng Shuyi to learn more about her preferences.
- Song Xiaoyingzi as Li Youran, the receptionist
- He Yongsheng as the editor-in-chief

== Soundtrack ==
Only for Love original soundtrack
| No. | Title | Singer | Length |
|---|---|---|---|
| 1. | "Passing Stranger" (Theme song) | Zhou Shen | 3:52 |
| 2. | "Lemon Sparkling Water" (Opening theme) | Lai Meiyun | 3:12 |
| 3. | "For U" | Wang Heye | 3:59 |
| 4. | "The Taste of Clouds" | Curley Gao | 3:41 |
| 5. | "Unspoken" | Hu Xia | 2:35 |
| 6. | "Rose" | Wang Xi | 3:54 |
| 7. | "Destiny" | Huang Xiaoyun | 3:20 |
| 8. | "Stars and Light" | Ye Qisheng | 4:20 |
| 9. | "Intrude My Life" | Lü Chengjue | 3:45 |
| 10. | "Scorching" | Zhu Zhihao | 3:25 |
| 11. | "Mood Remote Control" | Meng Jia and Xu Junshuo | 4:27 |
| Total length: | | | 40:00 |
