= Live Long and Prosper (TV series) =

- Promotional poster
- 咸鱼飞升
- Genre: Fantasy, Adventure
- Based on: Xian Yu Fei Sheng (lit. 'The Ascension of a Salted Fish') by Chonguan Andu
- Written by: Rao Jun
- Directed by: Ding Hei; Fu Cexin; Zheng Junmo
- Starring: Dylan Wang; Li Qin; Rong Zishan
- Country of origin: China
- Original language: Mandarin
- No. of seasons: 1

Production
- Production locations: Hengdian World Studios, Xinjiang
- Production companies: Nice Story; Baination; Phood

Original release
- Network: Hunan Satellite Television, Mango TV

Live Long and Prosper (Chinese: 咸鱼飞升; pinyin: Xiányú Fēishēng) is an upcoming period fantasy Chinese television drama. The series is directed by Ding Hei, Fu Cexin, Zheng Junmo, and stars Dylan Wang, Li Qin and Rong Zishan. Live Long and Prosper is based on a non-romance-driven xianxia fantasy web novel Xian Yu Fei Sheng (lit. 'The Ascension of a Salted Fish') by Chonguan Andu on Jinjiang Literature City. It is scheduled for release by Hunan Satellite TV and Mango TV.

== Synopsis ==
Set in a fantasy xianxia realm where cultivators pursue the Dao in their quest for immortality, Live Long and Prosper follows the lives of Song Qianji (Dylan Wang). In his first life, he was the foremost figure of the cultivation world, a character marked by ambition, competitiveness, and arrogance who exhausted himself in ceaseless rivalry. Granted a second chance at life and armed with prior knowledge, he resolves to drift through existence as a carefree 'salted fish' (a euphemism for someone who wishes to 'lie flat'), adopting a detached outlook and devoting much of his energy to tending his crops. Yet, by chance, he gathers a circle of steadfast companions and is unwillingly drawn into sectarian conflict. In the end, to protect the land and people he cherishes, he reluctantly returns to cultivation (advancing through successive levels of strength and facing heavenly tribulations), leading his comrades to shoulder the burden of salvation through his very being.

== Cast ==
=== Main ===
- Dylan Wang as Song Qianji, a rogue cultivator who rose from humble beginnings to become the foremost figure in the cultivation world after surviving countless life-and-death trials. Betrayed and driven to self-destruction in his previous life, he is reborn with his memories intact and resolves to abandon ambition in favour of a peaceful life, declaring that growing potatoes is more important than seeking immortality. However, his kindness and unassuming nature gradually gather a circle of loyal companions, drawing him back into the conflicts of the cultivation world.
- Li Qin as Miao Yan, renowned as the most beautiful woman in the cultivation world. In her previous life, she was bound by her pride and obsession with perfection. After her rebirth, she gradually awakens her own sense of self, and her relationship with Song Qianji becomes increasingly layered and conflicted as she breaks free from the role of a manufactured idol.
- Rong Zishan as Meng Heze, Song Qianji's devoted junior disciple. After being rescued by Song Qianji following his rebirth, his fate diverges completely from that of his previous life.

=== Supporting ===
- Wang Duo as Wei Zhenyu, a morally ambiguous figure regarded as the "chosen saviour". Initially an adversary of Song Qianji, he later becomes an ally, with their relationship evolving through rivalry, political intrigue and strategic manoeuvring.
- Zhang Yaqin as He Qingqing, a young woman whose life is shaped by hardship. Once an outcast subjected to bullying, her longing to be acknowledged gradually develops into an ambition to overturn the existing order.
- Xia Meng as Chen Hongzhu, the eldest daughter of the Huawai Sect. Upright, resolute and compassionate, she is willing to forsake her privileged status in pursuit of her ideals.
- Tong Mengshi as Ziye Wenshu, the leader of Qingya Academy, who once ventured into a demonic stronghold to rescue He Qingqing.
- Wu Xize as Yuan Qingshi.
- Ye Shengjia as Ji Chen.

== Production ==
Production for the series began in Hengdian World Studios in late April, with the series officially announced in mid-May at the Hunan Satellite TV & Mango TV industry conference. Production moved to Xinjiang in August and filming is complete as of 26 September 2025.
