= Wander Together =

- Promotional poster of series
- Traditional Chinese: 宇宙閃爍請注意
- Simplified Chinese: 宇宙闪烁请注意
- Hanyu Pinyin: Yǔzhòu Shǎnshuò Qǐng Zhùyì
- Genre: Reality television; Variety show
- Directed by: Xing Chen
- Starring: Huang Xiaoming, Huang Zitao, Liu Yaowen, Shao Ziheng, Dylan Wang, and Yu Yang
- Country of origin: China
- Original language: Mandarin
- No. of seasons: 1
- No. of episodes: 14

Production
- Producer: Shi Hui
- Camera setup: Multi-camera
- Running time: 220 minutes
- Production company: IQIYI

Original release
- Network: IQIYI
- Release: December 27, 2025 – March 14, 2026

Wander Together (Chinese: 宇宙闪烁请注意; pinyin: Yǔzhòu Shǎnshuò Qǐng Zhùyì) is a Chinese travel reality show produced and aired by iQIYI. It premiered on 27 December 2025, and concluded its first season on 14 March 2026, after 14 episodes. Episodes aired weekly on Saturdays at noon.

The programme follows the six-member Chinese celebrity group (Chinese: 宇宙爆闪团; lit. "Cosmic Flash Group") as they take road trips to explore locations connected to each member's personal identity and experiences.

The show featured an all-star travel game reality program featuring real interactions and absurdist tasks across various locations in China, including the Ailao Mountains in Yunnan, Harbin and Yabuli region in Heilongjiang, Chongqing, Leshan in Sichuan, Jiashan County and Hangzhou in Zhejiang, and Xuancheng in Anhui.

== Cast ==
The six cast members are referred to internally by age-based names during the show.

- Huang Xiaoming - Eldest Brother Huang (黄老大)
- Yu Yang - Second Brother Yang (二洋哥)
- Huang Zitao - Third Brother Huang (三黄子)
- Dylan Wang - Fourth Brother Di (四棣仔)
- Shao Ziheng - Fifth Brother Shao (五邵爷)
- Liu Yaowen - Sixth Brother (the youngest) (六老幺)

== Episodes ==
Season 1
Episode	Location(s)	Air Date	Ref.
1	Ailao Mountains, Yunnan	27 December 2025	
2	Ailao Mountains, Yunnan	27 December 2025	
3	Tea Horse Road, Yunnan	3 January 2026	
4	Tea Horse Road, Yunnan	3 January 2026	
5	Chongqing	10 January 2026	
6	Leshan, Sichuan	17 January 2026	
7	Chongqing	24 January 2026	
8	Harbin, Heilongjiang	31 January 2026	
9	Harbin, Heilongjiang	7 February 2026	
10	Yabuli, Heilongjiang	14 February 2026	
11	Yabuli Ski Resort, Heilongjiang	21 February 2026	
12	Jiashan County, Zhejiang	28 February 2026	
13	Jiashan County/Hangzhou, Zhejiang	7 March 2026	
14	Xuancheng, Anhui	14 March 2026	

== Production ==
The reality series was announced in September 2025 during iQIYI's investor conference. Filming for the reality series started in Yunnan in November 2025. A press conference was held in Harbin on 22 December 2025 ahead of the programme's premiere.

== Reception ==
The programme recorded a peak iQIYI heat index of 8864. It also ranked highly on third-party data platforms tracking streaming variety shows, including Yunhe (Enlightent), Dengta (Taopiaopiao), KuYun and Maoyan. According to Enlightent, it was the top new streaming variety programme of the first quarter of 2026, accumulating 340 million effective views of its main content episodes during the period.
