= Tong Mengshi =

Chinese actor

Thomas Tong
- Chinese: 佟梦实
- Born: 22 January 1993 (age 33); Xuzhou, Jiangsu, China
- Education: China University of Mining and Technology
- Occupation: Actor
- Years active: 2015–present
- Agent: Mango Entertainment

Thomas Tong Mengshi (Chinese: 佟梦实; born 22 January 1993) is a Chinese actor.

== Early life and education ==
Tong was born in Xuzhou, Jiangsu. Under his father's influence he became a National second-level athlete, specializing in 100-metre dash.

Tong studied at the China University of Mining and Technology. He worked as an advertisement model prior to his debut.

== Career ==
In 2014, Tong participated in the variety program Journey On Sail. The following year, he became known after participating in the variety program One Grade Graduation.

In 2016, Tong made his acting debut with a supporting role in the xianxia drama Noble Aspirations. The same year, he played his first lead role in the romance web series Proud of Love.

In 2017, Tong starred in the fantasy suspense drama Colorful Bone. In 2018, Tong played lead roles in the youth sports drama Basketball Fever, and fantasy wuxia drama The Taoism Grandmaster.

In 2019, Tong portrayed the role of Ying Zheng in the historical drama The Legend of Haolan. The same year, he gained recognition for his role as Wu Zhu in the historical drama Joy of Life.

He played the lead role of Yang Guo in the wuxia drama The New Version of the Condor Heroes, based on the novel of the same name by Louis Cha.

== Filmography ==
=== Television series ===
Year	English title	Chinese title	Role	Notes/Ref.
2016	Noble Aspirations	青云志	Shi Tou	
2016	Proud of Love	别那么骄傲	He Zhizhou	
2016	Noble Aspirations II	青云志2	Shi Tou	
2017	Proud of Love II	别那么骄傲2	He Zhizhou	
2017	Colorful Bone	艳骨	Chu Zizhong / Lue Ying	
2018	Basketball Fever	热血狂篮	Chu Xiao	
2018	The Taoism Grandmaster	玄门大师	Zhang Ling	
2019	The Legend of Haolan	皓镧传	Ying Zheng	
2019	Joy of Life	庆余年	Wu Zhu	
2020	Together	在一起		
2021	Bright as the Moon	皎若云间月	Rong Jing	
TBA	The New Version of the Condor Heroes	神雕侠侣	Yang Guo	
TBA	Fly in Sky	我星飞扬	Huo Bin	
TBA	Wonderful Time	一念时光	Gong Ou	
TBA	You Are My Eternal Star	你是我的永恒星辰	Lu Yuheng	
TBA	Please! 8 Hours	拜托了！8小时	Ye Tian	
TBA	Live Long and Prosper	咸鱼飞升	Ziye Wenshu	

== Discography ==
Year	English title	Chinese title	Album	Notes
2015	"Freshman"	新生	Grade One Graduation OST	
2016	"Enemies on a Narrow Road"	冤家路窄	Proud of Love OST	with Cyndi Wang
2018	"Sweet Traces"	甜蜜轨迹	Basketball Fever OST	with Xing Fei

== Awards and nominations ==
Year	Award	Category	Nominated work	Results	Ref.
2017	Men's UNO YOUNG Awards	Future New Talent Award	—N/a	Won	
2019	Bazaar Beauty Awards	Best New Charismatic Actor	—N/a	Won	
