= Beijing Film Academy =

Municipal public college in Beijing, China

- 北京电影学院
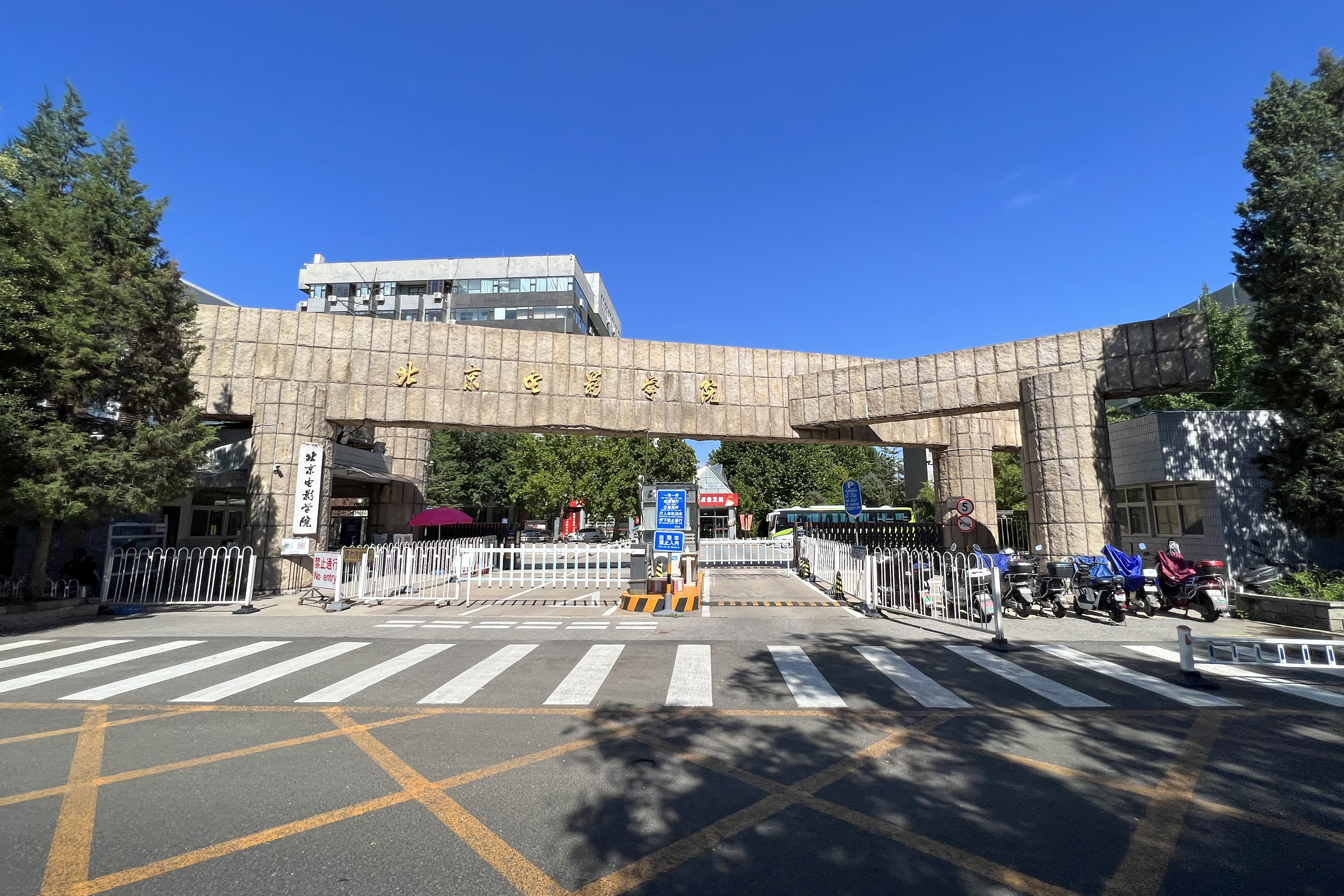
- Main entrance
- Type: Film school
- Established: 1950; 76 years ago
- Chancellor: Professor Zhang Hui-Jun
- Location: Haidian District and Huairou District, Beijing, China
- Campus: Urban
- Website: bfa.edu.cn

Beijing Film Academy (BFA; 北京电影学院) is a municipal public college in Beijing, China. It is affiliated with the City of Beijing and co-funded by the Beijing Municipal People's Government, the National Radio and Television Administration, and the Ministry of Education.

The predecessor of the Beijing Film Academy was the Research Institute of Performing Arts of the Central Film Bureau (中央电影局表演艺术研究所) founded in 1950. The institute was renamed the Film School of the Film Bureau of the Ministry of Culture of the Central People's Government (中央人民政府文化部电影局电影学校) in 1951. In 1953, the school was renamed Beijing Film School (北京电影学校). In 1956, the school was restructured into Beijing Film Academy.

== History ==
Established in May 1950, the Beijing Film Academy was first named Performance Art Institution of the Film Bureau of the Ministry of Culture. During its first year, 38 students enrolled. For the next five years, the school was renamed thrice - Film School of the Film Bureau of the Ministry of Culture in July 1951, Beijing Film School in March 1953 and finally, Beijing Film Academy on June 1, 1956.

Upon its first establishment, the academy contained 2 schools - the School of Photography and the Animation School with the associated departments and their subsequent specialties. The Screenwriting Department was one of the earliest departments to be established at the academy in 1951.

Gradually, the academy expanded its number of schools and departments. On September 14, 1950, BFA offered its first undergraduate course in performing arts. The course attracted a class of 30 students, many of whom were notable figures in film and television. Due to its success, BFA established the Performance Institute in June 1956. In 1952, BFA offered its first programs in sound recording. The Department of Sound Recording was officially founded in 1959. The Department of Sound Recording continued to grow throughout the years. In 1960, BFA's Department of Sound Recording and the School of Engineering were joined. BFA began offering a two-year course in film and television production management in September 1955. Although the first class only graduated 28 students, the popularity of the course grew, and a Department of Management was formally established in 1987.

In 1966, the Cultural Revolution brought hardships for schools throughout the People's Republic of China. BFA was equally affected; many of its professors left the academy. However, in the beginning of 1976, after the end of the Cultural Revolution, many faculty members returned to BFA. By 1977, the academy had recovered from the Cultural Revolution. Finally, in 1978, the academy allowed new students to apply.

=== Recent history ===
In 1989, the International School of the Academy was set up, along with the Information Research Center in October 1999.

Individual departments have also developed recently. Major development of the screenwriting department was the establishment of a postgraduate course with master's degree in Screenwriting in 1985, followed by the construction of the undergraduate program on Film Theories in 1987. Further postgraduate courses for Ph.D. students in Screenwriting were set up in 2004.

== Academics ==
The academy offers associate, bachelor, and master's degrees in many areas of film. BFA offers courses in script writing, film theory, film directing, film and television production, film acting, film and television art design, advertisements, animations, sound art, cinematography, photography, and entertainment management.

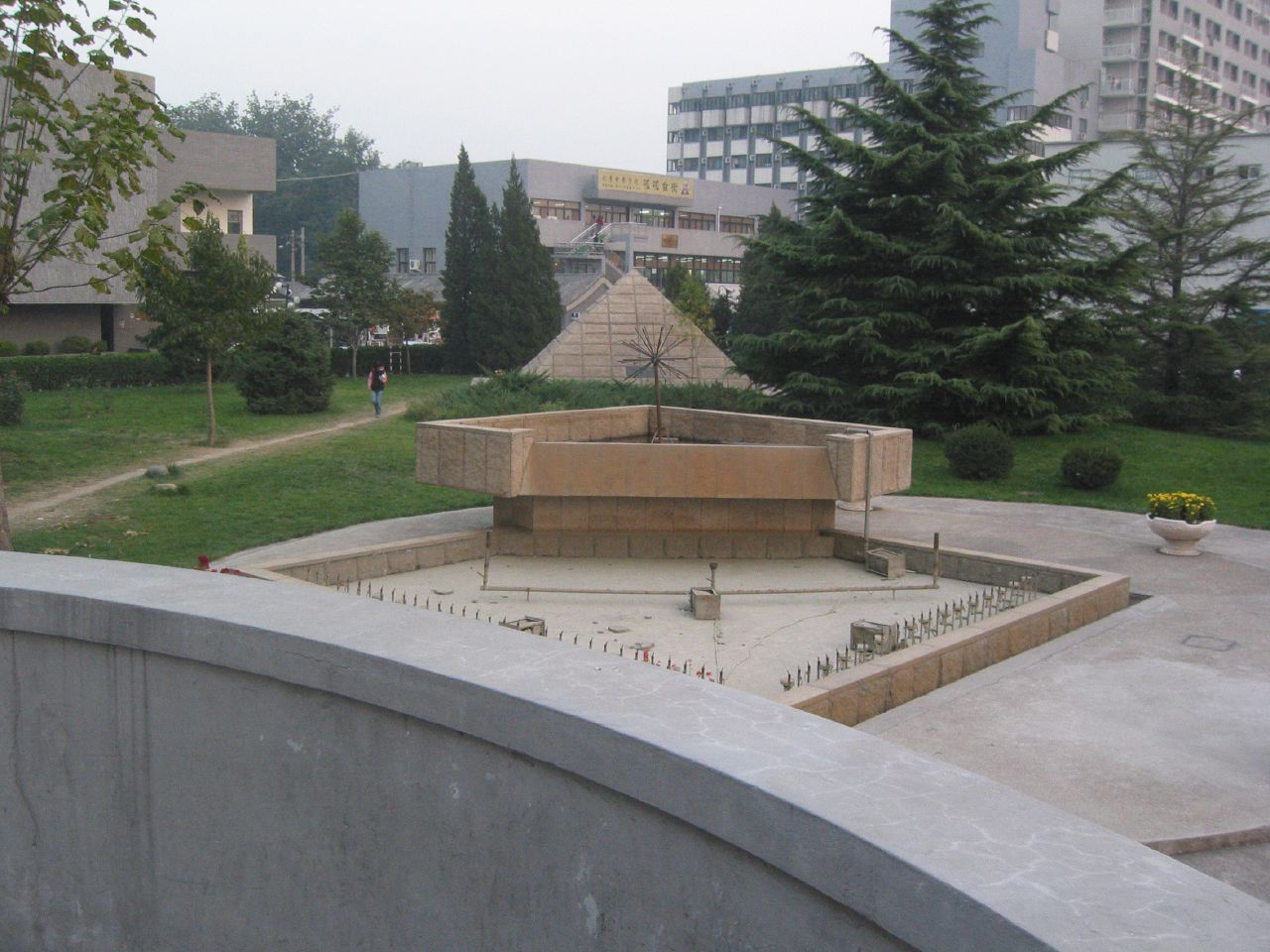

Courses other than the undergraduate and postgraduate studies are also offered. These are:

- Correspondence courses
- Night school courses
- Vocational courses

=== Schools and departments ===
Presently, there are nine schools that make up the Beijing Film Academy:

- Management School
- International Studies School
- Continuing Education School
- Audio-Visual Arts and Communication School
- Animation School
- Photography School
- Fine Arts School
- Sound School
- Performing Arts School

The school's curriculum is divided in 8 departments:

1. Department of Film and TV technology/Digital Media Institute - Digital film and television technology
2. Film and television technology - Film and television technology
3. Department of Film directing- Film directing
4. Department of Film Theory - Film studies
5. Department of Management - Film production management and distribution
6. Department of Photography - Cinematography
7. Department of Screenwriting and Cinema Studies - Film screenwriting
8. Department of Sound Recording - Basic Education

=== Admissions ===
The admission rate at Beijing Film Academy is one of the lowest in the country, as well as globally. Admission is extremely competitive. Over 40,000 students apply annually to participate in entrance exams. Only 400-500 students are accepted. The majority of the admissions process takes place in February and March. The entrance examinations include subject tests as well as the National Humanities Examination. Prospective acting majors usually have the most intense competition. International students looking to study at Beijing Film Academy may apply through the International Training Center. In 2013, the academy conducted its first undergraduate film production program in English. This program was conducted by the Cinematography department with a focus on cinematography, directing and post-production.

== Notable alumni ==
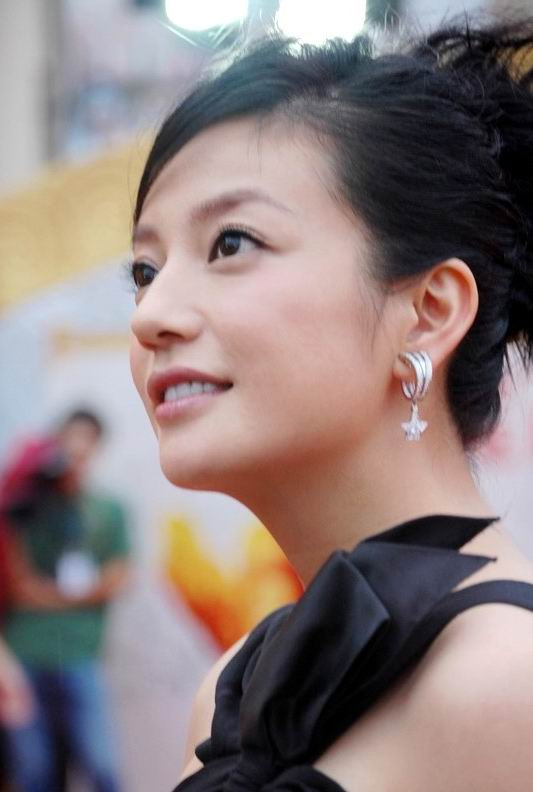
Zhao Wei

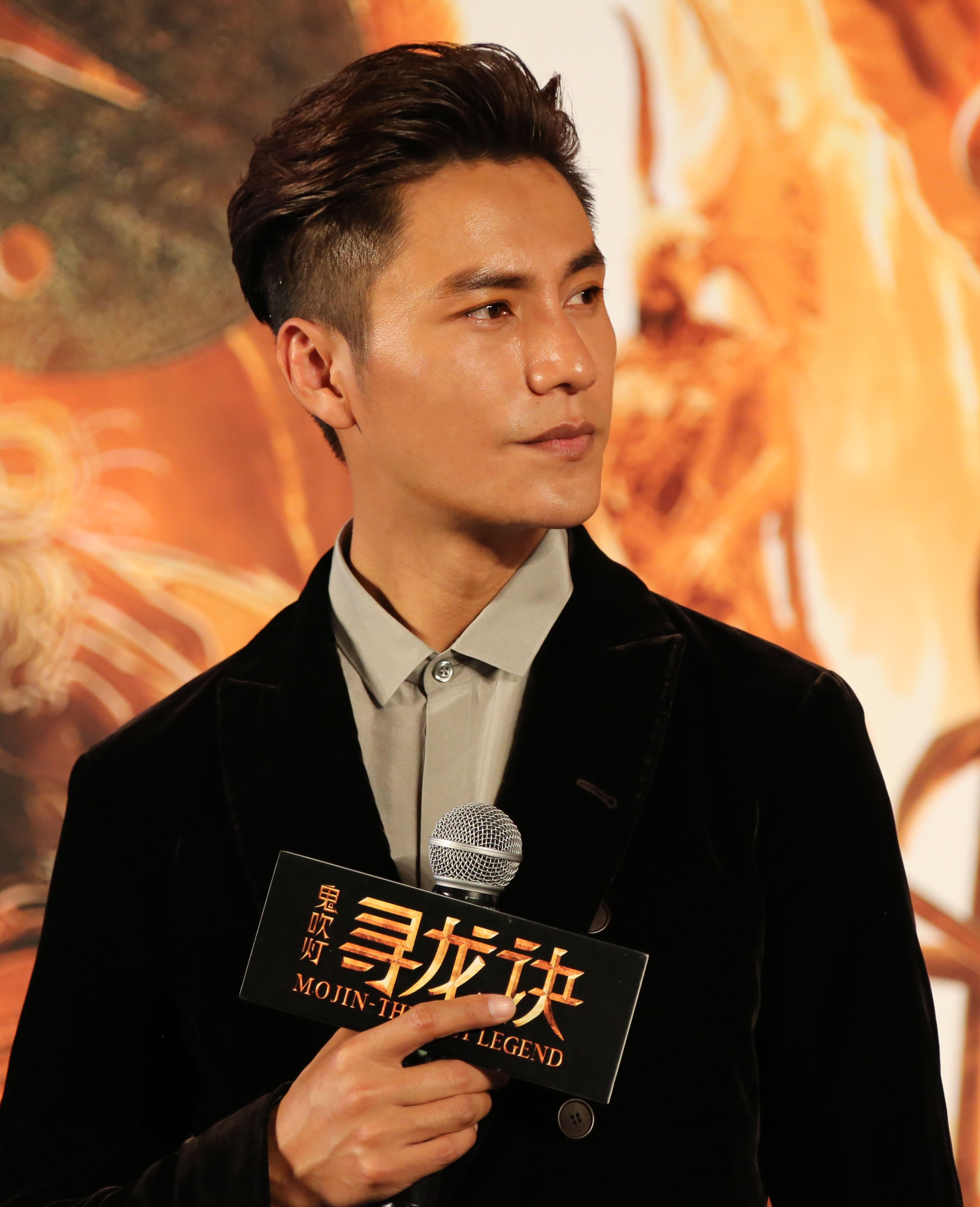
Chen Kun

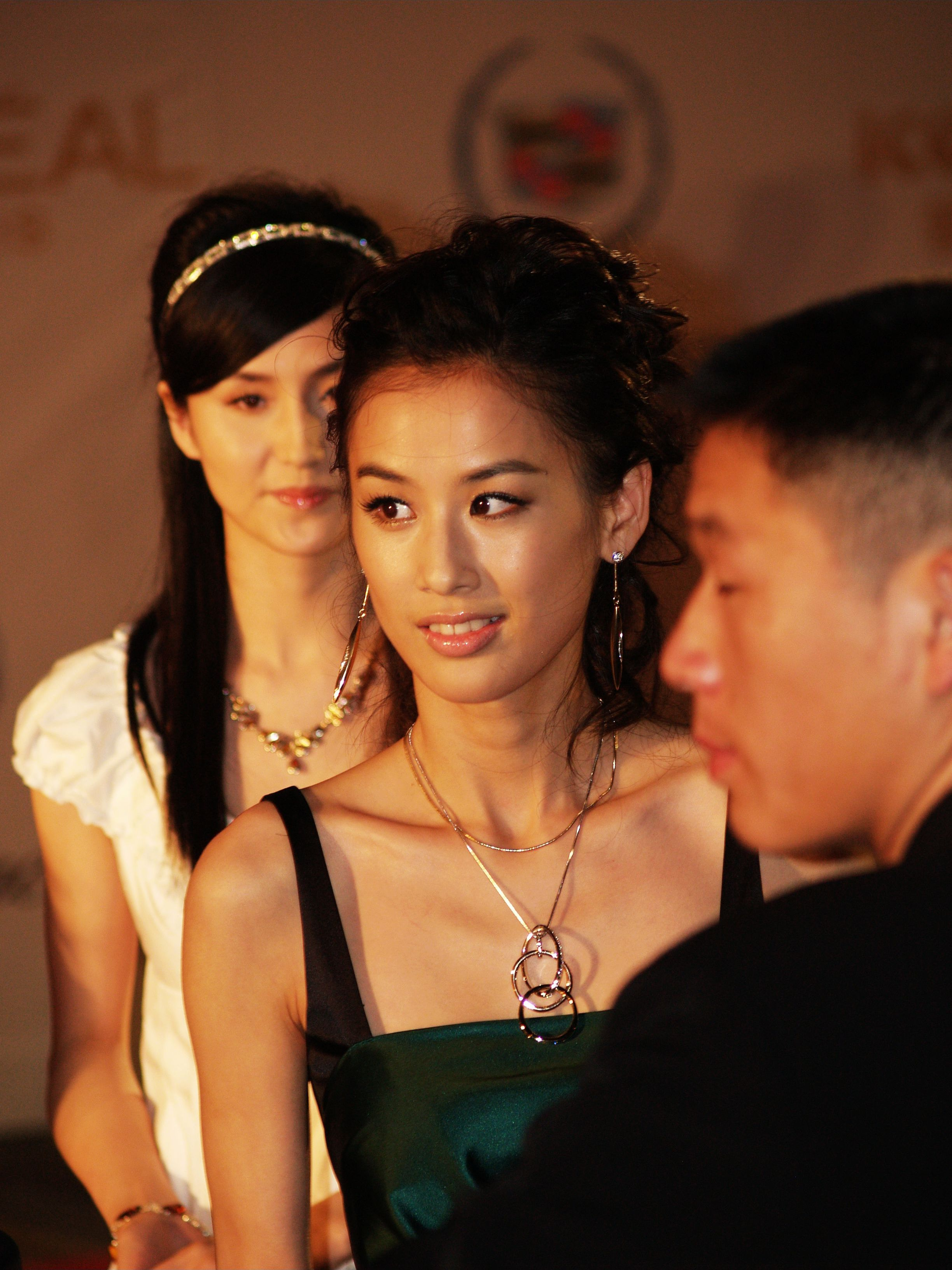
Huang Shengyi

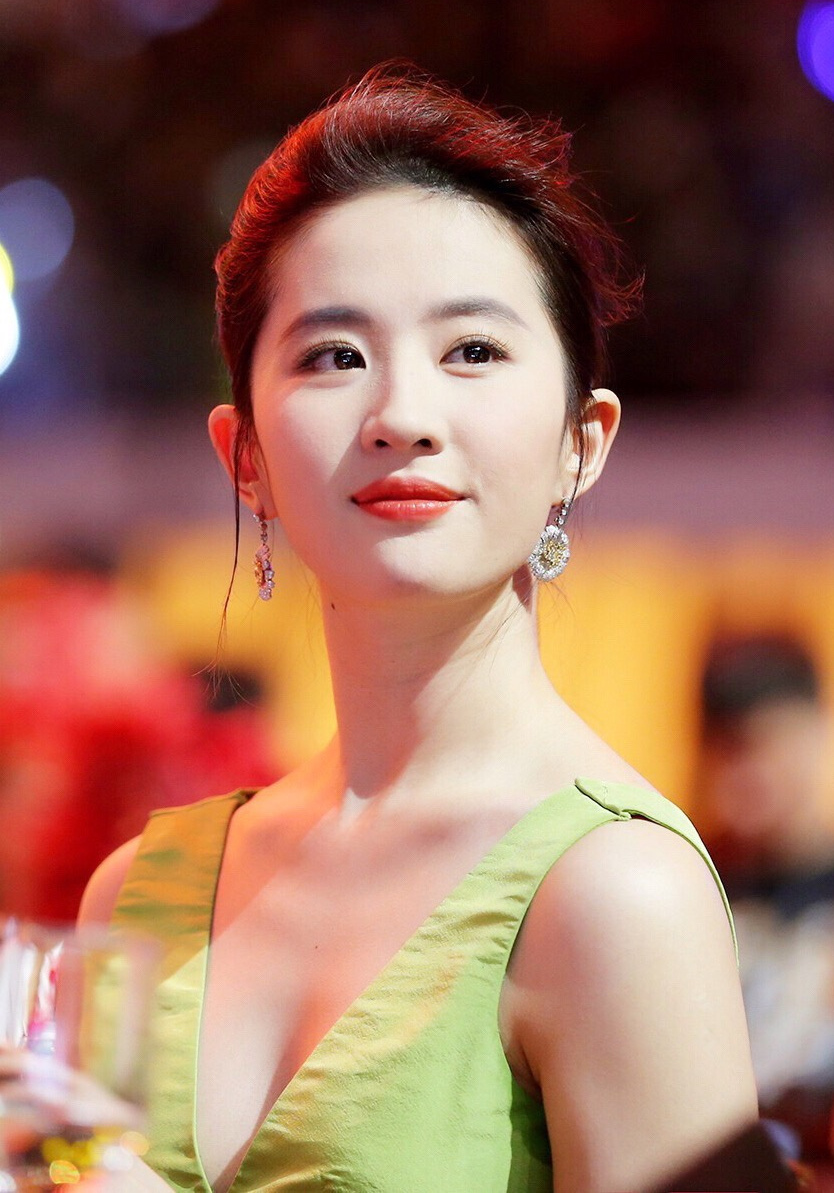
Liu Yifei

For over forty years, graduates of the Beijing Film Academy have won national and international acclaim for their contributions to film and television. Their notable alumni include directors, producers, and screenwriters, as well as actors and actresses. The majority of famous recent graduates are actors and actresses, as well as a few directors.

BFA's older famous graduates mostly consist of fourth-generation, fifth-generation, and sixth-generation directors. The most well-known fourth-generation directors include Wu Tianming, Wu Yigong, Teng Wenji, and Zhang Nuanxin. The three best-known fifth-generation directors all graduated from BFA (Tian Zhuangzhuang, Chen Kaige, and Zhang Yimou). Other famous Chinese filmmakers include Xie Tian, Chen Qiang, Wu Yigong, Huang Shuqin, Wu Tianming, Xie Fei, Hu Mei, Zheng Dongtian, Ni Zhen, Ding Yinmeng, Li Qiankuan, Cao Cuifen, Huang Jianxin, Wei Lian, and Teng Congcong. Finally, notable sixth-generation directors include Jia Zhangke, Wang Xiaoshuai, and Zhang Yuan.

Chinese-American filmmaker Dayyan Eng, who after graduating won awards at the Cannes Film Festival and Venice Film Festival, was a transfer student to Beijing Film Academy's Directing Department.

Contemporary Chinese artist and activist Ai Weiwei studied animation at BFA.

=== Performance Institute ===
Note that class year indicates the entrance year, not graduating year.

- Class of 1978: Zhang Fengyi, Zhang Tielin
- Class of 1982: Zang Jinsheng
- Class of 1984: Wang Zhiwen
- Class of 1988: Jiang Wenli, Xu Qing
- Class of 1989: Faye Yu, Shao Bing
- Class of 1990: Jiang Wu, Huang Lei
- Class of 1992: Yuan Li, Li Yixiang
- Class of 1993: Jia Zhangke, Xiaolu Guo, Xu Jinglei
- Class of 1994: Jiang Qinqin, Chen Zihan, Jin Qiaoqiao
- Class of 1995: Yu Nan, Zuo Xiaoqing
- Class of 1996: Zhao Wei, Chen Kun, Huang Xiaoming, Zu Feng
- Class of 1997: Huang Haibo, Hai Qing
- Class of 1998: Miao Pu
- Class of 1999: Yao Chen, Yu Bo, Du Chun
- Class of 2000: Dong Xuan
- Class of 2001: Huang Shengyi, Wang Luodan, Jia Nailiang, Ariel Aisin-Gioro, Yao Xingtong
- Class of 2002: Liu Yifei, Jiang Yiyan, Luo Jin, Zhou Yang, Zhu Yawen, Xiong Naijin, Bonnie Bo
- Class of 2003: Zhang Jiani
- Class of 2004: Lu Chen
- Class of 2005: Yang Mi, Jiao Junyan, Yuan Shanshan, Bao Wenjing, Zhang Xiaofei, Teng Congcong
- Class of 2006: Zhu Yilong, Zhai Tianlin, Ma Tianyu, Peng Guanying
- Class of 2007: Zheng Shuang, Jing Tian, Zhang Ruoyun, Kan Qingzi, Lu Shan
- Class of 2008: Shawn Dou, Cai Wenjing
- Class of 2009: Zhang Yunlong, Li Chun, Wu Jinyan, Liu Ruilin, Huang Mengying, Lai Yi, Tan Songyun
- Class of 2010: Zhang Yishan, Yang Zi, Lin Siyi, Li Xian
- Class of 2011: Gülnezer Bextiyar, Zhou Dongyu
- Class of 2012: He Ruixian
- Class of 2013: Chen Yao, Wang Hao Xuan, Zhang Wanyi, Jiang Peiyao, Song Yiren
- Class of 2016: Guan Xiaotong, Guo Junchen, Zhou Ye, Sun Anke
- Class of 2017: Wang Junkai, Eleanor Lee, Zhang Jingyi, Wang Ziqi,Meng Ziyi
- Class of 2018: Leo Wu, Song Zu'er, Huang Junjie, Sabrina Zhuang, Zhong Lili
- Class of 2019: Chen Feiyu, Shen Yujie
- Class of 2020: Zhang Zifeng, Yan Xujia, Xia Meng, Zhou Qi
- Class of 2021: Ding Chengxin
- Class of 2022: Yan Haoxiang, Ma Qiyue, He Luoluo
- Class of 2023: Yin Haoyu
