= Meng Ziyi =

Chinese actress

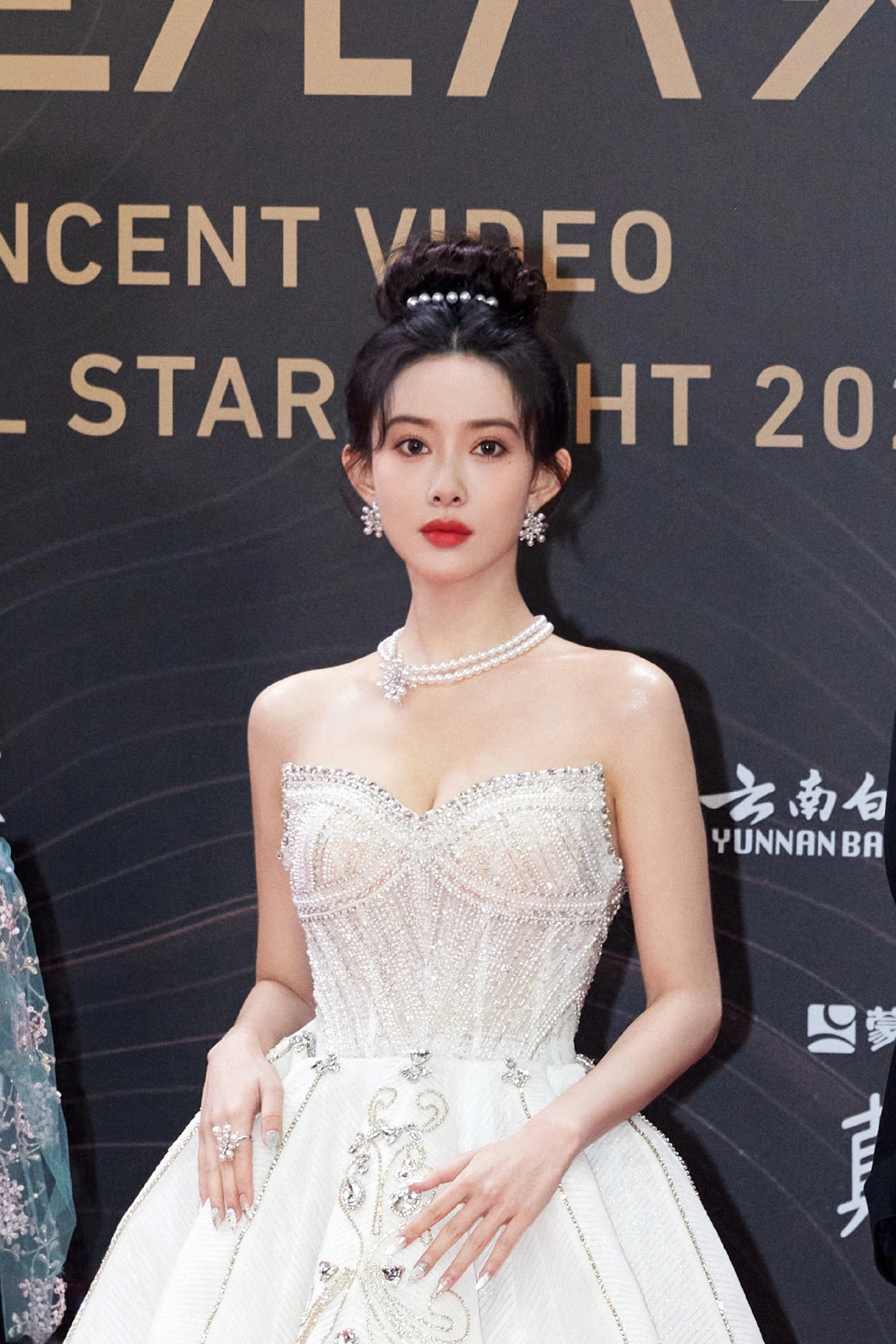
- Meng in 2023
- Born: Changchun, Jilin, China
- Other name: Zoey Meng
- Education: Beijing Film Academy
- Occupation: Actress
- Years active: 2014–present
- Agent: Yuekai Entertainment

Chinese name
- Simplified Chinese: 孟子义
Transcriptions
Standard Mandarin
- Hanyu Pinyin: Mèng Zǐyì

Meng Ziyi (Chinese: 孟子义) is a Chinese actress. She is known for her roles as Mu Nianci in The Legend of the Condor Heroes (2017), Ye Hongyu in Ever Night (2018), Wen Qing in The Untamed (2019) and Dou Zhao in Blossom (2024).

== Career ==
In 2016, Meng made her acting debut in the historical fiction television series God of War, Zhao Yun, and gained attention for her role as the female lead's attendant and close friend. In 2017, Meng became known after starring in the wuxia drama The Legend of the Condor Heroes as Mu Nianci.

In 2018, Meng played lead roles in the romance web dramas Double Life and Starlight. She then starred in romance melodrama All Out of Love, playing the role of an antagonist. The same year, she starred in the fantasy historical drama Ever Night, gaining attention for her performance as a strong and independent swordswoman.

In 2019, Meng starred in the xianxia drama The Untamed, based on the novel Mo Dao Zu Shi.

In 2020, Meng starred in the youth business drama Rebirth of Shopping Addict. The same year, she was cast in the wuxia drama Sword Snow Stride written by Wang Juan.

== Filmography ==
=== Film ===
Year	Title		Role	Notes	Ref.
Year	English	Chinese	Role	Notes	Ref.
2019	The Captain	中国机长	Female passenger in business class	Cameo	
2021	The Kingdom of Women	镜花缘之决战女儿国	Ruo Shui	Main role	
2024	Moments We Shared	云边有个小卖部	Tangtang	Support role	

=== Television series ===
Year	Title		Role	Notes	Ref.
Year	English	Chinese	Role	Notes	Ref.
2016	Legend of the Fool 2	傻儿传奇之抗战到底	Mei Ying		
2016	God of War, Zhao Yun	武神赵子龙	Shi Yan	Support role	
2016	People's Prosecutor	人民检察官	Zhou Wenwen	Main role	
2017	The Legend of the Condor Heroes	射雕英雄传	Mu Nianci	Main role	
2017	Ensanguined Youth	血染大青山	Lin Qingyue	Support role	
2017	Season Love	何所冬暖，何所夏凉	Yang Yali	Support role	
2018	Double Life	内衣先生	Xu Mengmeng	Main role	
2018	Starlight	那抹属于我的星光	Su Yan	Main role	
2018	All Out of Love	凉生，我们可不可以不忧伤	Ning Weiyang	Support role	
2018	Ever Night	将夜	Ye Hongyu	Main role	
2019	The Untamed	陈情令	Wen Qing	Support role	
2020	Rebirth of Shopping Addict	我不是购物狂	Gao Yang	Main role	
2020	Charming and Countries	十国千娇	Fu Yusheng	Main role	
2020	The Legend of Xiao Chuo	燕云台	Li Si	Support role	
2021	Da Lang Tao Sha	大浪淘沙	Lin Fan	Support role	
2021	Sword Snow Stride	雪中悍刀行	Hong Shu	Support role	
2022	Heroes	说英雄谁是英雄	Lei Chun	Main role	
2022	Immortal Samsara	沉香如屑·沉香重华	Zhi Xi	Main role	
2023	Royal Rumours	花琉璃轶闻	Hua Liuli	Main role	
2023	Parallel World	西出玉门	Long Zhi	Support role	
2024	The Legend of Heroes	金庸武侠世界	Mei Chaofeng / Mei Ruohua	Main role	
2024	Snowfall	冰雪谣	Wei Qiu	Guest role	
2024	Blossom	九重紫	Dou Zhao	Main role	
2025	Love in Pavilion	淮水竹亭	Qing Muyuan	Support role	
2025	The Princess's Gambit	桃花映江山	Jiang Taohua / Princess Chengping	Main role	
2025	Sword and Beloved	天地剑心	Qing Muyuan	Guest role	
2026	Blossoms of Power	百花杀	Shen Xihe / Gu Qingzhi	Main role	
2026	Tigers Sniff the Rose	尚公主	Mu Wanyao / Princess Danyang	Main role	
TBA	San Xian Mi Hui	天地剑心	Yi Sa	Main role	
TBA	Empress Reborn	将门独后	Shen Miao	Main role	
TBA	Endless Summers	爱在无尽夏	Hao Nian	Main role	
TBA	The Great Pei	了不起的裴千户	Ming Yuenu	Main role	
TBA	Beautiful Lantern Festival	上元锦绣	Xin Xiaojiu	Main role	
TBA	Have It All	一手摘星，一手捶地	He Feng / Xiao Qitang	Main role	

=== Variety show ===
Year	English title	Chinese title	Role	Notes/Ref.
2016	Grade One Freshman	一年级·毕业季	Cast member	
2023	Natural High	现在就出发	Recurring member	
