= Duo Wang =

Chinese actor (born 1991)

Wang Duo
- Born: May 21, 1991 (age 35); Shenyang, Liaoning, China
- Education: Shenyang Conservatory of Music
- Occupations: Actor; Singer
- Years active: 2012–present
- Height: 6.05 ft 0 in (1.84 m)

Chinese name
- Simplified Chinese: 汪铎
- Traditional Chinese: 汪鐸
Transcriptions
Standard Mandarin
- Hanyu Pinyin: Wāng Duó

Wang Duo (simplified Chinese: 汪铎 ; traditional Chinese:汪鐸 ; born May 21, 1991) is a Chinese actor. He is best known for his role as the dark, complicated and enigmatic Gongzi in Bloody Romance (2018), his dual roles as He Shouyue and The Master in the movie The Yin-Yang Master: Dream of Eternity (2020), Gu Qingzhang (Shulin) in A League of Nobleman (2023), and for his performance playing 3 roles as the tragic Nan Xuyue, Guo Shi and Tian Ming in the drama The Blossoming Love. He won the Chinese reality show The Good Man and was nicknamed the Comic Prince by the audience due to his manhua-like visuals.

== Career ==
In 2012, he participated in the Yunnan TV Perfect Voice competition and was ranked 5th amongst the contestants of Shenyang and 30th in the whole of China.

In 2015, he participated in the Chinese Good Man and won the runner-up. He was also recognized by Guo Jingming and joined the musical Tiny Times.

He made his acting debut in the epic Chinese drama Ice Fantasy. In 2018, he played Gong Zi in the drama Bloody Romance which marked his first role as a main male lead.

== Film ==
Year	English title	Chinese title	Role	Ref.
2016	L.O.R.D: Legend of Ravaging Dynasties	爵迹(电影)	Qila	
2017	Journey to the West: The Demons Strike Back	西游伏妖篇	Zhu Bajie	
2017	Mystery Notes	推理筆記	Qin Yifan	
2020	L.O.R.D: Legend of Ravaging Dynasties 2	爵跡2：冷血狂宴	Qila	
2020	The Yin-Yang Master: Dream of Eternity	晴雅集	He Shouyue/Tadayuki	
2026	Per Aspera Ad Astra	星河入夢		

== TV drama ==
- 2016: Huang Qi in " Illusion City "
- 2016 " Yes! Mr. Shang " as Wang Xingren
- 2017 " Mystery Notes " (web drama) as Saiki
- 2018 " Beauty Without Borders " (web series) played the role of Gongzi (Li Siyuan)
- 2023 " The Gentlemen's League " (web series) as Gu Qingzhang
- 2024 "The Legend of Sword and Fairy 4 " (web series) as Xuan Xiao/Xuan Ying
- 2024 " The Dream Returns " (web drama) as Zhuo Yixuan (guest role)
- 2025 " A Thousand Peach Blossoms in One Life " (web drama) plays Nan Xuyue/National Master/Tian Ming
- To be released: "A Mortal's Journey to Immortality" (web series) as Wang Chan, Master of the Ghost Spirit Sect
- To be released: Night Traveler as Yin Ximeng/ Yin Simon (web series)
- To be released: "Xiaoyao" as Lord Bingzhu
- To be released: " Blemish Flaw " as Zeng Jie
- To be released: " Hero Legends " as Qi Bo Chuan ( guest role )
- To be released: " Veil of Shadows " ( guest role )
- To be released: Live Long and Prosper

== Variety shows ==
- 2016 " Ace vs Ace (reality show) "
- 2019 " Actors Please Take Your Place (Season 1) "
- 2019 " The Truth! All Things " (Season 2 Episode 5)
- 2020 " Non-Daily Party " (Issue 11)

== Music videos ==
- In 2018, Wang was featured in MV of the song BEST of Xue Zhiqian's album Freak. The same year he was also featured in Lin Caixin's Night Watchman album's MV Black and White and Wallfacer.
