= Nine to Six =

Upcoming South Korean television series

- Promotional poster
- Hangul: 나인 투 식스
- RR: Nain tu sikseu
- MR: Nain t'u siksŭ
- Genre: Workplace; Melodrama; Romance
- Based on: The Rational Life by: Long Xiaoshan; Chen Chen; Chen Tong
- Written by: Choi Ji-oh
- Directed by: Lee Hyung-min; Oh Song-hee
- Starring: Park Min-young; Yook Sung-jae; Go Soo
- Country of origin: South Korea
- Original language: Korean

Production
- Production companies: Samhwa Networks; Studio S

Original release
- Network: SBS TV

Nine to Six (Korean: 나인 투 식스) is an upcoming South Korean workplace melodrama television series written by Choi Ji-oh, directed by Lee Hyung-min and Oh Song-hee, and starring Park Min-young, Yook Sung-jae, and Go Soo. Based on the 2021 Chinese drama The Rational Life, the series centers on a career-focused professional woman whose structured routine shifts when she encounters two men who challenge her perspectives on romance. It is scheduled to premiere on SBS TV on November 25, 2026, and will air every Wednesday and Thursday at 21:00 (KST). It will also be available for streaming on Amazon Prime Video.

== Premise ==
Kang Yi-ji, a career-driven professional dedicated entirely to her work, whose perspectives on work, love, and happiness begin to shift after she crosses paths with a colleague, Han Sun-woo. As Sun-woo and elite executive Park Hyun-tae both grow closer to Yi-ji, a romantic dynamic develops between the three individuals.

== Cast and characters ==
=== Main ===
- Park Min-young as Kang Yi-ji
- Yook Sung-jae as Han Sun-woo
- Go Soo as Park Hyun-tae

=== Supporting ===
- Joo Hyun-young as Shin Ji-won
- Kim Mi-kyung as Lee Kyung-shim
- Nam Yoon-ho as Lee Yong-woon
- Choi Ji-soo as Im Eun-ha
- Chun Woo-jin as Jung Tae-joon
- Jung Hae-kyun as Song Byung-je
- Jo Bok-rae as Jung Gi-tae
- Cha Chung-hwa as Lee Jung-eun
- Bae Yoo-ram as Kim Dong-suk

== Production ==
In the first quarter of 2026, Park Min-young, Yook Sung-jae, Go Soo, Joo Hyun-young, and Kim Mi-kyung were reportedly cast for the SBS TV workplace melodrama based on the 2021 Chinese drama of The Rational Life. The project was tentatively titled the same name before being finalized as Nine to Six. Produced by Samhwa Networks, directed by Lee Hyung-min, and written by Choi Ji-oh. By March 24, Park, Yook, and Go were officially confirmed to lead the series. Additionally, it is co-directed by Oh Song-hee and co-produced by Studio S. Three days later, Joo also confirmed her appearance. On April 21, it was announced that Choi Ji-soo joined the cast. By October 21, other supporting cast namely Kim, Nam Yoon-ho, Chun Woo-jin, Jung Hae-kyun, Jo Bok-rae, Cha Chung-hwa, and Bae Yoo-ram were unveiled at the first script reading.

== Release ==
Nine to Six was scheduled to air in the second half of 2026. Later, the series was confirmed to premiere on November 25, broadcasting in Wednesday–Thursday timeslot at 21:00 (KST). It will also be available for streaming on Amazon Prime Video across 240 countries and territories.
