= Bonnie Bo =

Chinese screenwriter

Bonnie Bo (also can be read as Bonnie Bai; traditional Chinese: 柏邦妮; simplified Chinese: 柏邦妮; form name: 张珊珊), also known by her birth name Shanshan Zhang, was born in 1982, Lianyungang City, Jiangsu Province. She is an author and screenwriter. She studied Literature and Reading from Beijing Film Academy. In 2005, she published a personal collection of essays known as "The Same As Bonnie Love You". In March 2008, she joined other writers to script the 2010 remake of the 1987 TV series Dream of Red Mansions. Three months later, the "youthful dream team" had finished 50 episodes. She was reportedly responsible for eight scenes. She writes for the fashion magazine Interview, and has worked as a film critic and columnist since 2003, interviewing Maggie Cheung, Gong Li, Ang Lee, Hou Hsiao-hsien, and other celebrities.
