= Per Aspera Ad Astra (2026 film) =

- Theatrical release poster
- Chinese: 星河入梦
- Hanyu Pinyin: Xīnghé Rùmèng
- Directed by: Han Yan
- Written by: Qian Ninghuang; Han Yan; Gao Lu; Liu Dalin; Xu Chen; Ma Peisi
- Produced by: Fu Ruoqing
- Starring: Dylan Wang; Victoria Song; Zu Feng; Luo Haiqiong; Wang Duo
- Cinematography: Simu Feng
- Music by: Stuart Michael Thomas; Kevin Riepl
- Production companies: China Film (Dongyang) Media Co., Ltd.; HD Entertainment; Shanghai Film Group Co., Ltd.; Lian Ray Pictures Co., Ltd.; China Film Co., Ltd.; Shen Dingge Wenhua Chuanmei (Wuxi) Co., Ltd.; Beijing Weimeng Chuangke Network Technology Co., Ltd.
- Release date: February 17, 2026
- Running time: 111 minutes
- Country: China
- Language: Mandarin
- Box office: US$14.8 million

Per Aspera Ad Astra (Chinese: 星河入梦; pinyin: Xīnghé Rùmèng) is a 2026 Chinese science fiction adventure film, directed by Han Yan and starring Dylan Wang and Victoria Song, with Zu Feng, Luo Haiqiong, and Wang Duo in supporting roles. The film revolves around a near-future virtual dream system called "Sweet Dreams" allowing people to create and control their own dream worlds, but inadvertently leading to hidden dangers.

== Plot ==
Set in the near future, where interstellar travel is made possible through decades-long hibernation, the virtual dream system 'Sweet Dreams LM' allows passengers to create and control vivid, interactive dreams, preventing their brains from atrophying during the long voyage. However, as the technology spreads, a crisis begins to unfold aboard the vessel Mengya. Dream system administrator Xu Tianbiao (played by Dylan Wang) and starship captain Li Simeng (played by Victoria Song) uncovers a catastrophic malfunction, become trapped in shifting dreamscapes, assuming different identities in each scenario. From a cutlery battle in a Western restaurant to a dystopian gunfight, they transform into assassins, warriors, and ninjas, engaging in clashes with criminal syndicates. As their journey progresses, they uncover the dark secrets hidden within "Sweet Dreams".

== Cast ==
- Dylan Wang as Xu Tianbiao, skilled IT administrator of the dream system aboard the Mengya. After being awakened during a malfunction of the LM dream system, he enters the dreams of the other crew members to wake them and uncover the cause of the crisis.
- Victoria Song as Li Simeng, captain of spaceship Mengya. After being awakened from the LM dream system by Xu Tianbiao, she joins him in navigating a series of interconnected dream worlds while attempting to save the ship and its crew.
- Zu Feng as Lao Bai, Mengya's chief engineer. Xu Tianbiao and Li Simeng enter his dream world to wake him and enlist his help in resolving the crisis aboard the ship.
- Luo Haiqiong as Li Simeng's mother, a renowned astronaut.
- Wang Duo as Ge Yang, the lead software engineer of the LM dream system.

== Production ==
The film is directed by Han Yan, with an original story by Qian Ninghuang. The screenplay was written by Qian Ninghuang, Han Yan, Gao Lu, Liu Dalin, Xu Chen, and Ma Peisi.

== Release ==
The film was originally scheduled for release in mainland China on July 5, 2025. On April 17, the production team announced that due to an increase in post-production VFX workload, the film will be delayed. The film was released on February 17, 2026.

The movie was subsequently released on Netflix on June 18, 2026.
