= Jiang Peiyao =

Chinese actress

- 姜珮瑶
- Born: March 10, 1994 (age 32); Beijing, China
- Education: Master's degree
- Alma mater: Beijing Film Academy (2012 undergraduate, 2016 postgraduate)
- Occupation: Actress
- Agent: Taiyang Chuanhe (2023–present)

Jiang Peiyao (Chinese: 姜珮瑶; born 10 March 1994) is a Chinese actress. She is known for her roles in the television series You Are My Hero (2021), Fantastic Doctors (2023) and Escape from the Trilateral Slopes (2024), and the film Line Walker 2: Invisible Spy (2019).

== Early life ==
Jiang developed an interest in filmmaking and acting while attending high school, where she joined a film club and participated in student productions. She subsequently studied acting at the Beijing Film Academy, where she initially struggled with self-confidence before gradually developing an interest in performance during her second year. She eventually graduated from the acting department of the Beijing Film Academy, where she studied acting at postgraduate level..

== Filmography ==
=== Television series ===
| Year | English title | Chinese title | Role | Ref. |
|---|---|---|---|---|
| 2018 | The City of Chaos | 悍城 | Lin Xi | |
| 2019 | Go Go Squid! | 亲爱的，热爱的 | Sun Yaya | |
| 2021 | You Are My Hero | 你是我的城池营垒 | Ruan Qingxia | |
| 2022 | Happy Partners | 开心合伙人 | Li Meng | |
| 2023 | Nothing But You | 爱情而已 | Luo Nian | |
| 2023 | Once and Forever | 曾少年 | Wang Ying | |
| 2023 | I Am Nobody | 异人之下 | Xia He | |
| 2023 | Only for Love | 以爱为营 | Bi Ruoshan | |
| 2023 | Fantastic Doctors | 非凡医者 | Yuan Ye | |
| 2024 | Escape from the Trilateral Slopes | 边水往事 | Susu | |
| 2024 | Riverside Code at Qingming Festival | 清明上河图密码 | Chi Liaoliao | |
| 2025 | The Hunt | 命悬一生 | Tian Baozhen | |
| 2026 | Light to the Night | 黑夜告白 | Qiao Suqing | |
| 2026 | Archives: The Nanyang Mystery | 南部档案 | Zhang Haiqi / Miss Dong (impostor) | |
| 2026 | Love Is in the Air | 爱情有烟火 | Yao Jingjing | |
| 2026 | Heavy Treasure | 重器 | Xia Yingjie | |
| 2026 | River of No Return | 两京十五日 | Su Jingxi | |
| TBA | Since the Red Moon | 从红月开始 | Chen Jing | |

=== Films ===
| Year | English title | Chinese title | Role | Ref. |
|---|---|---|---|---|
| 2016 | Artificial Intelligence: Fuxi Awakening | 人工智能：伏羲觉醒 | Cathy | |
| 2017 | Pure Hearts: Into Chinese Showbiz | 纯洁心灵·逐梦演艺圈 | Huang Ru | |
| 2018 | A Better Tomorrow 2018 | 英雄本色2018 | Yangyang | |
| 2019 | Line Walker 2: Invisible Spy | 使徒行者2：谍影行动 | Yao Keyi | |
| 2020 | Ash | 灰烬重生 | Xuanhui | |
| 2021 | Are You Lonesome Tonight? | 热带往事 | Xueming's girlfriend | |
| 2023 | The River | 三线轮洄 | Yi Sa | |
| 2023 | The Comeback | 零号追杀 | A Zhen | |
| 2023 | An Encounter to Remember | 最好的相遇 | Li Wenjing | |
| 2025 | Sons of the Neon Night | 风林火山 | Xiaoye | |
| 2025 | Keep Your Chin Up | 命运中转栈 | Xiao Ai | |
| 2025 | Irrevocable Bladesman | 无归客 | Meng E | |
| TBA | Days Related to Youth | 与青春有关的日子 | Qiaoqiao | |
| TBA | Sweet Life | 甜美生活 | Mrs. Cheng | |
| TBA | Sleeping City | 沉睡城 | Lixiang | |
| TBA | The Lying-Flat Club | 躺平俱乐部 | Cao Wenwen | |

=== Theatre ===
| Year | Production | Role | Notes |
|---|---|---|---|
| 2014 | This Man Is a Little Flustered (这个男人有点慌) | Zhang Jiaqi | Premiered on 17 September. Twelve performances were held at the Qinglan Theatre |

== Awards and nominations ==
| Year | Award ceremony | Award | Work | Result |
|---|---|---|---|---|
| 2019 | iQIYI Scream Night | Drama Potential Artist of the Year | Go Go Squid! | Won |
| 2019 | Greater Bay Area Film Industry Conference and Film Night (formerly the Chinese Film Media Awards) | Most Promising Actress | Line Walker 2: Invisible Spy | Won |
| 2023 | 4th New Era International Film Festival Golden Yanghua Awards | New Era Most Challenging Actress | The Killer's Game | Won |
