= Light to the Night =

- 黑夜告白
- Genre: Crime drama
- Directed by: Wang Zhi
- Starring: Pan Yueming; Dylan Wang
- Country of origin: China
- Original language: Mandarin
- No. of seasons: 1
- No. of episodes: 28

Production
- Producer: Chen Zhixi
- Production location: Kunming
- Running time: 45 minutes
- Production companies: Ruyi Pictures; Youku; Wanda Film; Yuekai Entertainment; Beijing Wuyuan Culture Media; Beijing Zuocheng Youyu Film and Television Culture Media

Original release
- Network: Youku
- Release: 26 April 2026

Light to the Night (Chinese: 黑夜告白; pinyin: Hēiyè Gàobái) is a Chinese television drama. The criminal investigation drama series is directed by Wang Zhi, and stars Pan Yueming, Dylan Wang and Ren Min. The series explores an 18-year-long police quest for the truth behind a mysterious disappearance case. It began airing on Youku and Netflix from 26 April 2026 and Viu on 3rd of May 2026

== Synopsis ==
In 1997, Detective He Yuanhang (Pan Yueming) and his young apprentice Ran Fangxu (Dylan Wang) investigate the mysterious disappearance of a father and daughter from the Xu family. The two vanished without a trace from the elevator of a residential complex in Yuanlongli.

The case unfolds across three intertwined timelines -1997, 2002, and 2015. What initially appears to be a possible debt evasion slowly reveals deeper mysteries as time passes. Years later, He Yuanhang's daughter, He Xiaohe (Ren Min), now a police officer, discovers a connection between past events and the Xu family case. Together with her father, she reopens the investigation. As the complex faces demolition in 2015, they seize one last chance to piece together the truth, like a shattered puzzle, across two decades of relentless pursuit.

== Cast ==
=== Main cast ===
- Pan Yueming as He Yuanhang, a seasoned, obsessive detective haunted by an unsolved disappearance case from 1997. Father to Xiaohe, their relationship grows strained as his obsession with the case deepens, leaving him burdened by guilt in later years as he spends years trying to uncover the truth, even as time and setbacks wear him down.
- Dylan Wang as Ran Fangxu, a sharp and idealistic, freshly graduated detective who partners with He Yuanhang. His fresh perspective and relentless pursuit of justice often clash with his partner’s cynicism, but eventually they form a deep bond with plenty of playful bickering
- Ren Min as He Xiaohe, daughter of He Yuanhang who is affected by the aftermath of the disappearance case, and eventually joins the police force, determined to help solve the mystery that tore her family apart.

=== Supporting cast ===
- Jiang Peiyao as Qiao Suqing
- Song Qiaoyingzi as Xu Meng
- Zhao Huzi as Qu Dahai
- Zheng Qi as Zhao Jie
- Jiang Qilin
- Liu Chuang
- Zhou Dayong

== Production ==
Filming for the Youku crime television series began in March 2024 in Kunming, Yunnan. The concept poster, released on the first day of filming, featured cryptic elements like a dress, heels, and a glowing 18th-floor lift button, with details signaling a plot spanning 1997 to 2015. In July 2024, it was announced that filming for the drama had been completed.

On April 21, 2026, it was announced that the series will be premiering on April 26, 2026 on Youku and Netflix. and Viu
