= The Rational Life =

2021 Chinese television series

- Poster for the series
- 理智派生活
- Genre: Romance; Workplace drama; Urban drama
- Based on: Alpha Code (阿尔法守则)
- Written by: Long Xiaoshan; Chen Chen; Chen Tong
- Directed by: Hsu Fu-chun
- Starring: Qin Lan; Dylan Wang; Li Zonghan; Bao Wenjing
- Country of origin: China
- Original language: Mandarin
- No. of seasons: 1
- No. of episodes: 35

Production
- Executive producer: Wang Rouxuan
- Production location: Shanghai
- Production company: Mango TV Creation Centre

Original release
- Network: Hunan Television
- Release: 31 March – 18 May 2021

Related
- Nine to Six

The Rational Life (Chinese: 理智派生活) is a 2021 Chinese television drama series, adapted from the novel Alpha Code (阿尔法守则). The workplace romance series is directed by Hsu Fu-chun, and stars Qin Lan, Dylan Wang, Calvin Li, and Bao Wenjing.

The series premiered on Hunan Television on 31 March 2021 and concluded on 18 May 2021. It was streamed exclusively on Mango TV in mainland China and released internationally on Netflix on 18 June 2021.

== Synopsis ==
Shen Ruoxin is a 33-year-old lawyer in the legal division of Zhenpeng Group, an automotive company in Shanghai. Despite her professional abilities, she faces workplace discrimination and office politics that hinder her career progression. When she becomes involved in a case concerning a customer injured by one of the company's vehicles, evidence is used to implicate her publicly. Her boyfriend is revealed to have orchestrated the incident to damage her career and persuade her to leave her job and marry him. Shen ends the relationship, but the controversy results in her transfer to the administrative department.

Qi Xiao, a freshly graduated legal assistant 12 years her junior, remains supportive of Shen despite her change of position. Together with You Sijia, another junior colleague, he becomes one of her trusted allies as she navigates workplace rivalries and rebuilds her professional standing. Their friendship gradually develops into romance as Shen reconsiders her reservations about their age difference and challenges conventional expectations of relationships.

Meanwhile, Xu Minjie, a senior partner transferred from the company's Shenzhen headquarters to become president of its New Energy Division, also pursues Shen. Outside work, Shen faces pressure from her mother, Zhou Yilan, to marry. The series also follows Song Ziyan, Shen's best friend and colleague, whose experiences as a housewife offer another perspective on marriage and personal fulfilment.

== Cast ==
=== Main cast ===
- Qin Lan as Shen Ruoxin (沈若歆), a 33-year-old lawyer in the legal division of Zhenpeng Group. A capable and independent professional, she faces workplace discrimination and pressure from her family to marry.
- Dylan Wang as Qi Xiao (祁晓), a young legal assistant 12 years younger than Shen. He admires her and becomes one of her closest allies at work before their relationship develops into romance.
- Li Zonghan as Xu Minjie (徐敏杰), a senior partner transferred from the company's Shenzhen headquarters to become president of its New Energy Division. A Columbia University MBA graduate and accomplished executive, he pursues Shen.
- Bao Wenjing as Song Ziyan (宋梓妍), Shen's best friend and former bank employee who becomes a full-time housewife after marriage. She later rediscovers her passion for drumming and cooking while seeking a renewed sense of purpose.

=== Supporting cast ===
- Pan Hong as Zhou Yilan (周依兰), Shen Ruoxin's divorced mother, a retired English teacher who is traditional and strongly concerned about her daughter's marriage.
- Guo Kaimin as Shen's father (沈父), an emergency department doctor who is sociable and idealistic but carries regrets about having neglected his wife and daughter in pursuit of his ambitions.
- Kang Kang as Zou Cheng (邹诚), Song Ziyan's husband, a deputy general manager in a shopping centre's leasing department who initially takes his wife's domestic contributions for granted.
- Shi Yu as Zou Cheng's father (邹父).
- Yang Kun as Zou Cheng's mother (邹母).
- Gu Kejia as Zou Ying (邹莹), Zou Cheng's younger sister.
- Chen Pengwanli as Su Yang (苏洋), a 23-year-old freelance illustrator who struggles to establish himself professionally in Shanghai and develops a relationship with his university classmate You Sijia.
- Lin Xinyi as You Sijia (尤思佳), a legal department intern and Shen's junior colleague who supports her at work.
- Zhang Yanyan as Fang Lisa (方丽萨), deputy general manager of sales in the New Energy Division, later promoted to executive president.
- Wei Yibo as Liu Pei (刘沛), general manager of Zhenpeng Group, who later resigns.
- He Bin as Ruan Ye (阮晔), senior manager in the legal department who competes with Shen for the director position.
- Wang Yinan as Li Fang (李芳), director of the administrative department.
- Tong Yue as Cui Lixin (崔立新), a sales manager who dates Shen and attempts to pressure her into marriage.
- Tian Miao as Qi Xiao's mother (祁母), who raised him after her husband's death.
- Qian Yongchen as Gu Yutao (顾禹涛), an overseas-educated lawyer and partner at an international law firm who previously knew Shen at university and later attempts to pursue a relationship with her.
- Wu Junchao as A Ting (阿霆), the lead singer of a rock band who encourages Song Ziyan to rediscover her musical interests.
- Bao Beier as the master of Fengchitang (风驰堂主), a prominent automotive industry influencer.

== Production ==
The series was initially announced under the working title The Woman Who Cannot Fall in Love (无法恋爱的理智派). Production began in Suzhou on 28 September 2020, with filming scheduled to take place over approximately 100 days in Suzhou and Shanghai.

The series was directed by Hsu Fu-chun and produced by Mango TV, with Wang Rouxuan serving as executive producer. In discussing the development of the screenplay, Wang said that the production sought to portray the everyday challenges faced by women over 30, including workplace discrimination and social expectations surrounding marriage. Drawing on research and real-life experiences, the writing team revised the original screenplay over a two-month period and reduced conventional dramatic conflicts in favour of a more realistic narrative.

== Release ==
The Rational Life premiered on Hunan Television on 31 March 2021, airing in its Youth Theatre (青春进行时剧场) time slot from Monday to Thursday. Episodes were also streamed on Mango TV in mainland China. The television broadcast concluded on 18 May 2021, with a total of 35 episodes.

The series was released internationally on Netflix on 18 June 2021. LMTW reported that Netflix had acquired exclusive international distribution rights to the series, making it the first Chinese-language drama acquired exclusively by the platform in 2021.

== Themes ==
The series addresses workplace discrimination against women over 30 and the social pressure to marry. Its portrayal of Shen Ruoxin's career and family relationships reflects the conflicts between women's professional ambitions and traditional expectations surrounding marriage and family life in mainland China.

The relationship between Shen and Qi Xiao also addresses social attitudes towards age-gap relationships in China. The series presents their romance as part of a broader discussion about individual choice and the freedom to pursue relationships beyond conventional expectations.

== Adaptations ==
In January 2026, SBS announced a South Korean adaptation titled Nine to Six starring Park Min-young, Yook Sung-jae, and Go Soo. It is scheduled to premiere on SBS TV on November 25, 2026.
