= Tigers Sniff the Rose =

- Simplified Chinese: 尚公主
- Hanyu Pinyin: Shàng gōngzhǔ
- Genre: Romance
- Based on: Shang Gong Zhu by Yi Ren Kui Kui
- Written by: He Fang
- Directed by: Qin Zhen
- Starring: Li Yunrui; Meng Ziyi
- Country of origin: China
- Original language: Mandarin

Production
- Running time: 45 minutes

Original release
- Network: Tencent Video

Tigers Sniff the Rose (Chinese: 尚公主; pinyin: Shàng gōngzhǔ) is an upcoming 2026 Chinese television series starring Li Yunrui and Meng Ziyi. Directed by Qin Zhen and written by He Fang, the series is adapted from the novel Shang Gong Zhu by Yi Ren Kui Kui. It is scheduled to premiere on Tencent Video on 23 October 2026.

== Synopsis ==
Unwilling to accept the fate given to her, Mu Wanyao (Meng Ziyi), the daughter of a noble family, joins forces with Yan Shang (Li Yunrui), a brilliant young scholar from a humble background. As chaos sweeps the land, they work together to restore peace and build a prosperous realm.

== Casts ==
=== Main ===
- Li Yunrui as Yan Shang
- Meng Ziyi as Mu Wanyao

=== Supporting ===
- Wu Hankun
- Shen Jiayu

== Original Soundtrack ==
Tigers Sniff the Rose OST (尚公主 影视原声带)
No.	Title	Lyrics	Music	Singer	Length
1.	"I Protect Myself" (我护我)	Tang Tian	Zhou Yili	Zhang Bichen	4:55
2.	"With Me" (同我)	Lu Weiran	Liu Zhaolun	Hu Xia	4:16
3.	"Rose and Bamboo" (蔷薇青竹)	Tang Tian	Peng Fei	Zhang Yuan, Huang Xiaoyun	4:33
4.	"Autumn Breeze and Jade Dew" (金风玉露)	Chen Xi	Chen Xi	Duan Aojuan	3:50
5.	"Auspicious Spring" (吉时春)	Yuan Heling, Fu Maohua	Liu Zhaolun	Xiao Aqi, Zhang Hexuan	4:25
6.	"Rise with the Wind)" (同风起)	Fei Hu, Xiong Zhipeng (Xiao Xiong Na)	Zheng Bingbing	Wang Xiaokun	4:08
