= Love Story in Shanghai =

Chinese television series

Love Story in Shanghai, also known as Symphony of Rain, is a 2001 Chinese period television drama series directed by Zhao Baogang, set in 1930s Shanghai.

The show was broadcast on 14 national networks almost simultaneously beginning in late May 2001, and more than 20 local networks during the year. It dominated ratings on Shanghai Television and was the top-rated show on Guangdong Television for the year. In Taiwan, it was broadcast on Taiwan Television in February/March 2001 and received respectable ratings. In Japan, the show was streamed on the website showtime.jp beginning in May 2007.

== Cast ==
- Zhou Xun as Du Xinyu
- Chen Kun as Chen Zikun
- Lu Yi as Li Yingqi
- Luo Haiqiong as Fang Ziyi
- Li Xiaoran as An Qi
- Sun Honglei as Ah Lai
- Liu Jui-chi as Wu Chuyu
- Kou Hsi-shun as Du Yunhe
- Xu Huanhuan as Fan Lijun
- Liao Fan as Wu Boping
- Yu Luosheng as Li Rongsheng
