= Luo Haiqiong =

Chinese actress

- Born: August 10, 1973 (age 53); Lanzhou, Gansu, China
- Education: Shanghai Theatre Academy
- Years active: 1998–present
- Spouse: Fei Qi (m. 2010)
- Children: 1 daughter (b. 2011)

Chinese name
- Traditional Chinese: 羅海瓊
- Simplified Chinese: 罗海琼
Transcriptions
Standard Mandarin
- Hanyu Pinyin: Luó Hǎiqióng

Luo Haiqiong (Chinese: 罗海琼; pinyin: Luó Hǎi Qióng; 10 August 1973) is a Chinese actress.

== Biography ==
Luo Haiqiong enrolled in Gansu Art School when she was just 12. After three years of studying dancing, she worked for Lanzhou Art Troupe for 4 years. In December 1994, after a performance at the Shanghai Theatre Academy in Shanghai, she was encouraged by a faculty to apply to that school to become an actress. She did and was accepted in 1995, where she became a classmate of Lu Yi. Her breakout came in 2001 for starring in the TV series Love Story in Shanghai, which made her famous domestically.

== Filmography ==
=== Film ===
Year	English title	Original title	Role	Notes
2001	Dancing Girls	一曲柔情	Ye Hong	
2006	In The Blue	浅蓝深蓝	Teacher Luo	
2007	Assembly	集結號	Doctor Zhang	
2008	If You Are the One	非诚勿扰	Miao woman	
2014	The Break-Up Artist	分手达人	Mei'er	
2017	Cheers for the Youth	青春逗	Sister Kuan	
2018	Really?	我说的都是真的！	Wang Xiu	
2019	My People, My Country	我和我的祖国		
2026	Per Aspera Ad Astra	星河入梦		

=== TV series ===
Year	English title	Original title	Role	Notes
1998	Souls Attached to Harbin Institute of Military Engineering	魂系哈军工	Qin Zhen	
1999	Legends of Nezha	蓮花童子哪吒	Daji	
2001	Love Story in Shanghai	像霧像雨又像風	Fang Ziyi	
2001	Bus Police	巴士警探	Jiang Wenwen	
2002	Vicissitude of Shanghai	上海滄桑	Chai Lamei	
2002	Imperial Doctor	皇朝太医	Duan Suwen & Duan Lingshu	
2002	100 Days of Surprises and Love	百日惊情		
2003	Thirteen Sons of Heaven Bridge	天橋十三郎	Ding Zhaolan	
2003	Gardenia and Magnolia	梔子花白蘭花	Yue'e	
2003	Assassinating Tiger	刺虎	Nian Xiaoping	
2003	Golden Sword, Eagle Feathers	金劍雕翎	Yue Xiaochai	
2004	I'm Looking Forward to Being Loved	好想好想谈恋爱	Tao Chun	
2004	Chinese Young Chefs	中华小当家	Enya	
2004	King of Yelang	夜郎王		
2004	Heaven, Earth, Conscience	天地良心		
2004	The Story of Zhuo'er	卓尔的故事		
2005	Six Women and the Shop	六女當舖	Tiankui	
2005	National Official	国家干部	Li Junwei	
2005	Dead Men Do Tell Tales	大宋提刑官	Zhu Yinggu	
2005	Jade Love	玉卿嫂	Jin Yanfei	
2006	The Beautiful Wedding Dress	美丽婚纱	Zhu Zhu	
2006	Red Powder	红粉	Xiao'e	
2006	How Much Scent of Chrysanthemums	几度菊花香	Juxiang	
2006	The End of the Road is Heaven	末路天堂	Fang Kexin	
2006	Happenings in Tianjin	津門煙雲	Dong Xiaoman	
2007	I'll Wait For You in Heaven	我在天堂等你	Bai Xuemei	
2007	My Ugly Mother	我的丑娘	Xu Qianqian	
2007	Wanton and Luxurious Living	紙醉金迷	Yuan Yuan	
2007	The Out-of-Control Game	失控游戏	Lü Xiaojie	
2008	Big Sky, Big Earth	天大地大	Black Grape	
2008	Remembrance of Dreams Past	故夢	Qin Yansheng	
2008	Out of the Shell	破茧而出	Lü Xiaojie	
2009	Proof of Identity	身份的證明	Ye Yuyao	
2009	Memories of the Golden Flame	烽火影人	Meng Qiushui	
2009	Happy In-Laws	欢喜亲家	Lu Qiwei	
2010	Southbound, Southbound	南下南下	Qingge'er	
2010	Happiness On the Way	幸福在路上	Li Li	
2010	Days Searching For Happiness	寻找幸福的日子	Hong Yun	
2011	Borrow Gun	借槍	Pei Yanling	
2014	The Wrong Action	錯伏	Ouyang Yunduo	
2015	Cold Winter	寒冬	Zhu Yuchen	
2016	May–December Love 2	小丈夫		
2016	Yip Man and Bruce Lee	葉問與李小龍		
2017	Game of Hunting	猎场	Jian Na	
2017	The Kite	風箏	Han Bing	
2018	Take My Brother Away	快把我哥带走	Wang Jia	
2020	The Best Partner	精英律师		Cameo

== Awards and nominations ==
Year	#	Award	Category	Work	Result
2008	29th	Hundred Flowers Awards	Best Supporting Actress	Assembly	Nominated
2009	15th	Shanghai Television Festival Magnolia Awards	Best Actress	Wanton and Luxurious Living	Nominated
2011	6th	Huading Awards (TV drama)	Best Actress (Revolution-Era Drama)	Borrow Gun	Nominated
2018	24th	Huading Awards	Best Actress (Period Drama)	The Kite	Won

== Personal life ==
Luo Haiqiong married vice president of Huayi Brothers Fei Qi on January 24, 2010.
