= Blossom (Chinese TV series) =

Chinese television drama series

- Promotional poster
- 九重紫
- Genre: Guzhuang; Romance; Drama
- Based on: Jiu Chong Zi by Zhizhi
- Written by: Jia Binbin; Zhi Zhi
- Directed by: Zeng Qingjie
- Starring: Meng Ziyi; Li Yunrui
- Country of origin: People's Republic of China
- Original language: Mandarin
- No. of episodes: 34

Production
- Production location: Hengdian World Studios
- Production company: Youhug Media

Original release
- Network: Tencent Video
- Release: December 6 – December 28, 2024

Blossom (Chinese: 九重紫; pinyin: Jiǔ Chóng Zǐ) is a Chinese television drama series adapted from the web novel of the same name Jiu Chong Zi by Zhi Zhi. It is produced by Youhug Media, written by Jia Binbin and Zhi Zhi, and directed by Zeng Qingjie. The series stars Meng Ziyi as Dou Zhao and Li Yunrui as Song Mo.

The series was exclusively streamed on Tencent Video from December 6, 2024, and was broadcast online in more than 150 countries and regions through Tencent Video Overseas Station, iQIYI Overseas Station, Viki, and Youhug Media Official Channel on YouTube.

== Synopsis ==
After a tragic life filled with betrayal and injustice, noblewoman Dou Zhao unexpectedly wakes up years in the past, armed with the memories and regrets of her previous life—and a mysterious prophetic book. Determined to change her fate and protect her family, she forges a partnership with Song Mo, a general who shares her secret of rebirth. Together, they navigate court intrigue, hidden conspiracies, and personal vendettas, slowly building trust and affection as allies who get a second chance to right the wrongs of their first lifetime.

== Cast ==
=== Main ===
- Meng Ziyi as Dou Zhao / Shougu (窦昭 / 寿姑)

Betrayed by her husband in the first lifetime, Dou Zhao (known to family as Shougu) is given a mysterious notebook known as Chronicles of the World, and is reborn as her younger self with memories of her first lifetime intact. Determined to live her life to the fullest, she uses knowledge of the future to try and remain a step ahead. Through this, she also becomes entangled in the conspiracies surrounding Song Mo and his family.

- Li Yunrui as Song Mo, courtesy name Yantang (宋墨)

Blinded by hatred and betrayed by royalty in the first lifetime, Song Mo's fate is entwined with Dou Zhao in the second lifetime, and is given a second chance to find out the truth behind his uncle's death.

=== Supporting ===
- Snow Kong as Miao Ansu, Dou Zhao's good friend and later sister-in-law
- Xia Zhiguang as Ji Yong / Master Yuantong
- Yan An as Song Han, Song Mo's younger brother
- Li Baihui as Dou Ming, Dou Zhao's younger half-sister
- Shang Qi as Su Yan
- Li Xinze as Wei Tingyu
- Quan Yilun as Wu Shan
- Zhu Junlin as Chen Jia
- Dong Zifan as Prince of Qing
- Wang Tonghui as Dou Shishu, Dou Zhao's fifth uncle
- Mu Liyan as Grandma Cui, Dou Zhao's grandmother
- Wang Jiusheng as Song Yichun, Song Mo's father
- Du Yiheng as Wang Ge, a powerful eunuch
- Wu Qi as Chen Qushui, Dou Zhao's strategist
- Zhang Meng as Wang Yingxue, Dou Zhao's step-mother
- Tan Kai as Emperor
- Liu Meitong as Zhao Zhangru, Dou Zhao's good friend
- Ye Zuxin as Crown Prince
- Yumiko Cheng as Empress Wan
- Fu Weilun as Gu Yu, Song Mo's good friend

== Production ==
The drama was announced to be completed in Hengdian on March 27, 2024.

== Soundtrack ==
All lyrics are written by Zhou Jieying; all music is composed by Hu Xiaoou.

| No. | Title | 演唱 | Length |
|---|---|---|---|
| 1. | "久念 Miss You For A Long Time" (Theme Song) | Xianzi | 04:59 |
| 2. | "重圆 Reunion" (Back Ground Music) | Jeryl Lee Pei Ling | 03:43 |
| 3. | "紫忆 Purple Memories" (Back Ground Music) | Zhang Zining | 04:10 |
| 4. | "不羡 Do Not Envy" (Back Ground Music) | Bo Yuan | 04:37 |
| 5. | "昭昭墨墨 Zhao Zhao Mo Mo" (Emotional theme song) | Meng Ziyi, Li Yunrui | 04:31 |

== Impact ==
The popularity of the drama has driven the original novel to top the best-selling list for girls, the book friends list, the hot search list and many other lists on Qidian.
