= Dylan Wang =

Chinese actor (born 1998)

- 王鹤棣
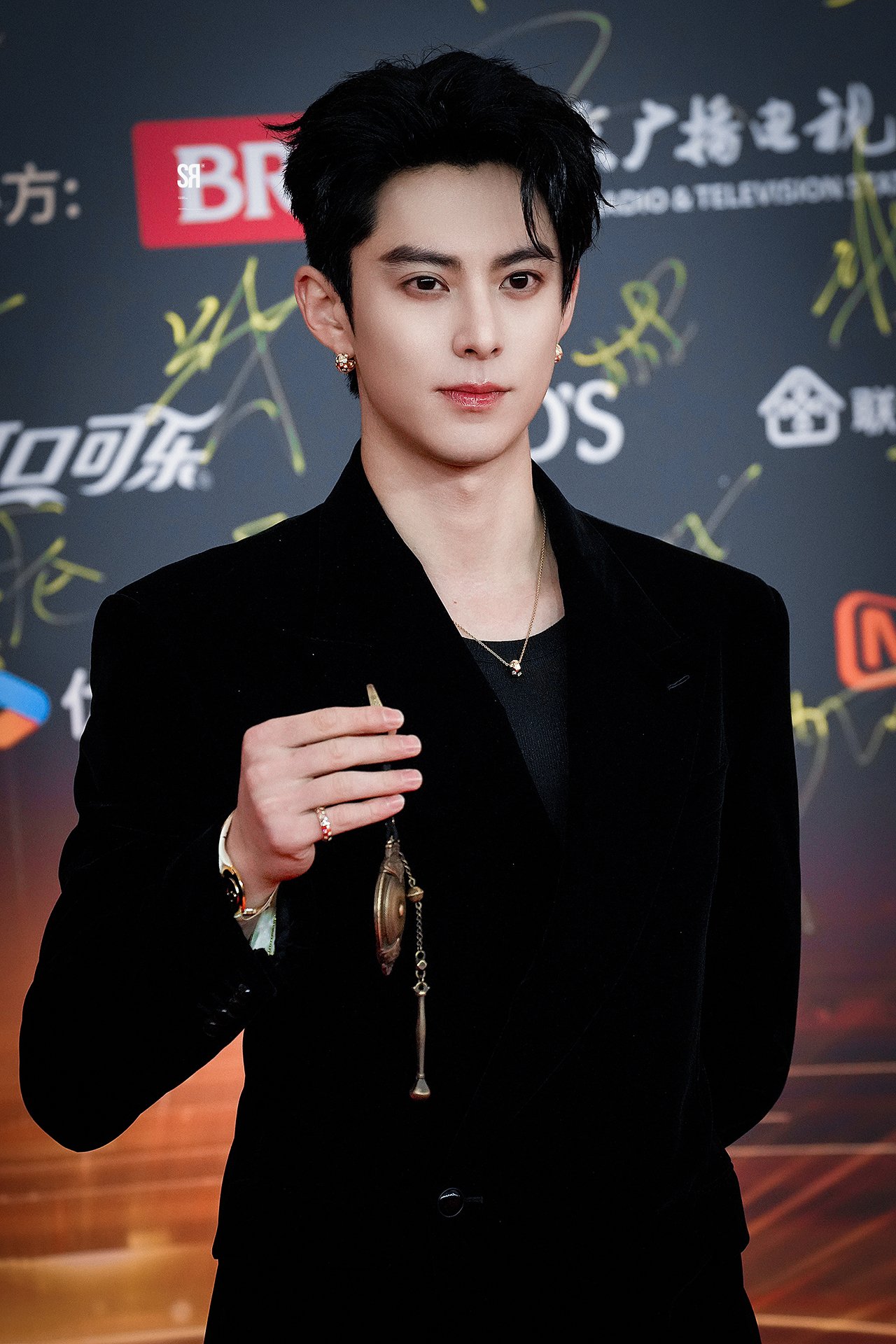
- Wang at the 2024 Weibo TV and Internet Video Summit
- Born: Wang Hedi; 20 December 1998 (age 27); Leshan, Sichuan, China
- Education: Sichuan Southwest Vocational College of Civil Aviation
- Occupations: Actor; singer
- Years active: 2017–present
- Agent: Mon Young Entertainment

Chinese name
- Traditional Chinese: 王鶴棣
- Simplified Chinese: 王鹤棣
Transcriptions
Standard Mandarin
- Hanyu Pinyin: Wáng Hèdì

Wang Hedi (Chinese: 王鹤棣; pinyin: Wáng Hèdì; born 20 December 1998), also known as Dylan Wang, is a Chinese actor and singer. He is known for his role as Daoming Si in his acting debut Meteor Garden (2018), as Dongfang Qingcang in Love Between Fairy and Devil (2022), as Shi Yan in Only for Love (2023), and as Xu Qi'an in Guardians of the Dafeng (2024). In 2026, he starred in his first theatrical film, the science fiction feature Per Aspera Ad Astra, and the crime drama Light to the Night. Besides acting, Wang is also a cast member on several variety programmes, such as Hello, Saturday and Wonderland. Wang has also released music as a solo artist and launched a streetwear label in 2022.

== Early life and education ==
Wang was born in Leshan, Sichuan province, to parents who had been employees of a local pharmaceutical factory. His family later started a fried skewer restaurant. From a young age, Wang developed a passion for basketball and became a fan of LeBron James. At the age of 14, he moved to Chengdu to attend a vocational high school and later the Sichuan Southwest Vocational College of Civil Aviation. During his time at the vocational college, he was the face of its recruitment posters for the Flight Attendant program. In 2016, Wang won the inaugural Sichuan Campus Celebrity Gala competition, an event organised by Weibo in collaboration with various universities and colleges.

== Career ==
=== 2017–2021: Early career ===
In June 2017, 18-year-old Wang participated in the Youku talent competition variety show Super Idol hosted by He Jiong, after being approached by the programme's casting director through a private message on Weibo. He won the contest and captured the attention of Taiwanese drama producer Angie Chai. He subsequently auditioned for the lead role in the television adaptation of Meteor Garden, and was cast in the production in 2017.

Wang made his acting debut as Daoming Si in the 2018 television series Meteor Garden, a remake of the popular 2001 Taiwanese drama based on the Japanese shōjo manga series Boys Over Flowers. The youth drama premiered in July 2018 on Hunan Satellite TV in China and internationally on Netflix. Wang also participated in Tencent Video's celebrity basketball tournament Super Penguin League in the summer of 2018. In October, he joined the second season of Hunan TV's reality show The Inn as a regular cast member.

In June 2019, Wang was cast in the period drama Youth in the Flames of War with Zhou Ye. He also participated in several episodes of Hunan Satellite TV celebrity reality show Chinese Restaurant 3 as a guest cast member. In September 2019, Wang participated again in the Super Penguin Basketball Celebrity Game hosted at the Shanghai Oriental Sports Center. In the same year, he was cast as male lead in the second season of fantasy drama Ever Night. The series premiered in January 2020. Wang was also a cast member on Beijing Television's cultural outdoor variety programme The Summer Palace (2020), led by Zhang Guoli. In the same year, he participated in Hunan TV's celebrity variety gameshow The Irresistable as a regular cast member.

Wang starred as the male lead in the age-gap romance workplace drama The Rational Life (2021) alongside Qin Lan. He also starred in costume fantasy drama Miss the Dragon (2021) along with Zhu Xudan. The series received negative reviews, with Wang's styling and performance attracting criticism. In subsequent interviews, he acknowledged shortcomings in his portrayal of the character and discussed his approach to acting in historical fantasy productions.

=== 2022–present: Rising popularity ===
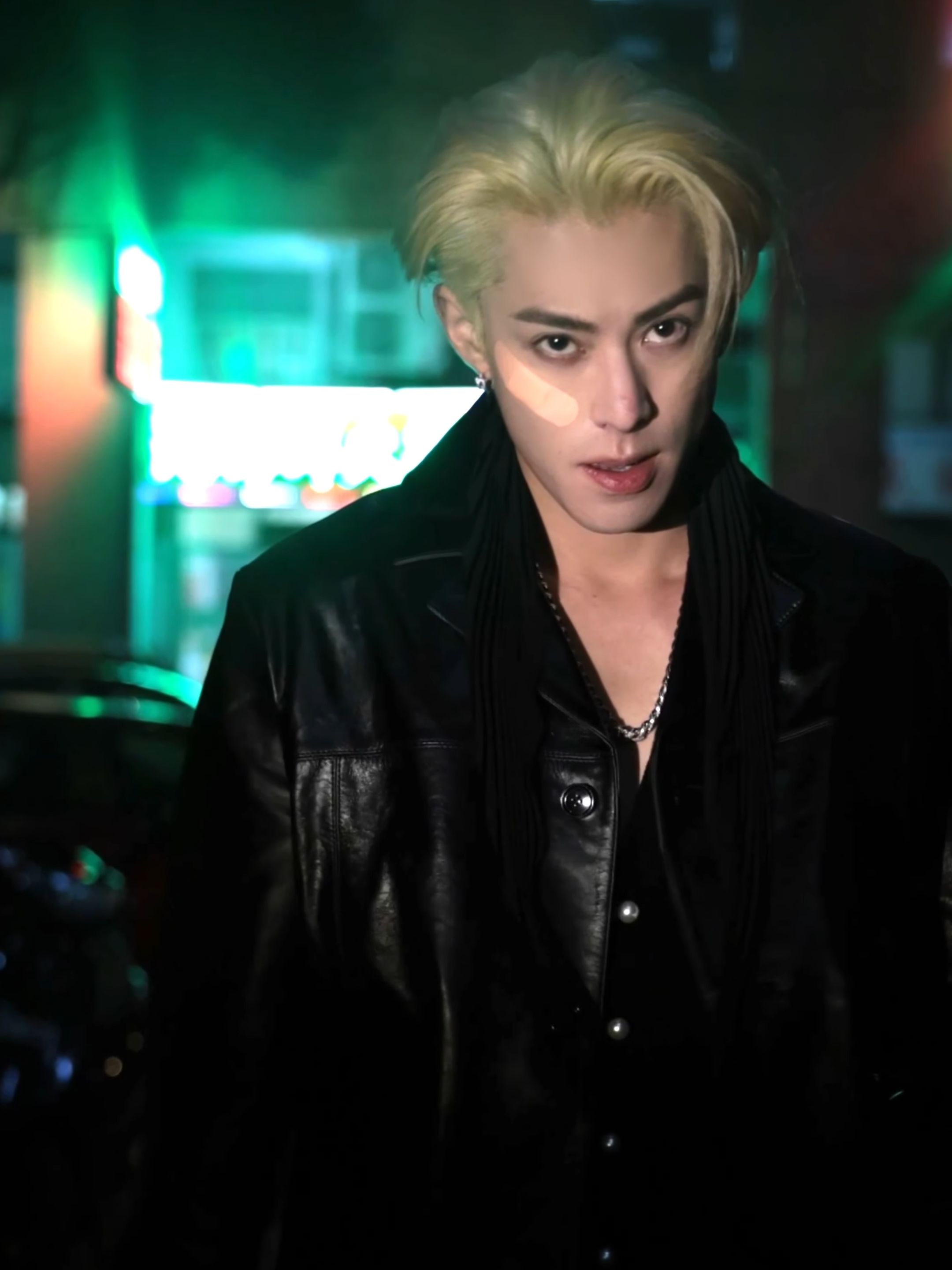
Wang in 2023

In January 2022, Wang joined the Hi 6 Group, the host group of Hunan Satellite TV's variety show Hello, Saturday led by He Jiong. He was also a regular cast member in the second season of celebrity reality show Wonderland. In July 2022, he joined the Douyin urban exploration reality show Going All Out Action School, along with Huang Minghao, Victor Qin and Hanikezi. In the same month, he participated in the sports reality series Basketball Buddies, a collaboration between NBA China and Kuaishou.

Wang later starred in iQiyi's xianxia drama Love Between Fairy and Devil, playing the role of Dongfang Qingcang. The show premiered in August 2022, and became the fourth drama on the iQiyi platform to exceed ten thousand points of performance metric in popularity within two weeks of its premiere, ranking first across all 191 territories worldwide on iQiyi. The series propelled Wang to widespread fame domestically, with his social media following increasing rapidly across all platforms while the show was being aired. On November 9, Wang was selected for China Movie Channel's 2022 Stars and Seas Young Actors Selection Program, upon recommendation by his Wonderland 2 co-star and veteran actress Song Dandan. Those chosen receive enhanced training and greater access to resources for advancing their acting careers.

From late 2022 to early 2023, Wang's historical costume drama Unchained Love was aired on iQiyi. He also starred in modern sitcom Never Give Up, which was aired on iQiyi in early 2023. His period drama Youth in the Flames of War was aired on Jiangsu Television 3 years after filming wrapped. His romance drama Only for Love with actress Bai Lu was aired on Mango TV and Hunan TV in November 2023.

Wang participated in the 2024 NBA All-Star Celebrity Game. In March 2024, it was announced that he had begun filming Youku crime series Light to the Night; production wrapped in June 2024. On 28 December 2024, Wang held his first major concert, the 'D.PARTY Concert in Bangkok', at Impact Arena, featuring guest appearances from frequent collaborators, along with interactive fan segments and live performances. Wang's detective comedy costume television series Guardians of the Dafeng, adapted from the eponymous web novel, started airing in December 2024; principal photography had concluded in late 2023 after a 5-month shoot. The period drama series surpassed 30,000 points on Tencent Video's popularity index.

In January 2025, Wang's docu-fiction film I Dreamed a Dream, directed by Wei Shujun, premiered at the Rotterdam Film Festival. In May 2025, Wang was announced as the lead protagonist in the costume drama Live Long and Prosper, an adaptation of Zhongguan Andu's atypical non-romance xianxia web novel—a subversive "farming underdog" story. Filming wrapped in September 2025. Wang was also a main cast member in iQiyi's celebrity reality travel series Wander Together that aired from December 2025 to March 2026.

On 17 January 2026, Wang's D.PARTY in Macau concert was held at the Galaxy Arena. Wang's first theatrical film, science fiction feature Per Aspera Ad Astra, directed by Han Yan, was released in February 2026 as part of the Spring Festival lineup. In February 2026, Wang returned for The Inn 2026, a soft reboot of the reality series that aired from 2017 to 2019 on Hunan TV and Mango TV, assuming the role of inn manager after having previously served as a staff member in 2018. In March 2026, Wang started filming historical fiction drama series Empress Reborn, an adaptation of a web novel written by Qian Shan Cha Ke. In April 2026, Wang's first crime suspense series, Light to the Night, began airing on Youku, with a simulcast on Netflix.

== Endorsements ==
In November 2018, Wang served as the youth ambassador at Le Tour De France Skoda Shanghai Criterium.

Wang and his Meteor Garden co-stars were the spokespersons for Thai snack brand Tao Kae Noi in early 2019. He was also the ambassador for Philippine clothing brand Bench and held a Manila fan meeting in 2019. Between 2022 and 2024, Wang endorsed more brands within the mainland Chinese market. He was the China spokesperson for Peacebird, SAIC Volkswagen New Tharu, G-Shock, Anker, Colgate, Sabon, Pizza Hut, Oreo, Estée Lauder skincare, Bolon eyewear, Xtep, Yili Group's Ambpomial, Fenty Beauty, and the global ambassador for Maybelline, and worldwide wellness partner for Chagee.

As of June 2026, Wang is the spokesperson for domestic brands Amap (Gaode Maps), and Yili Group's Chocliz, Wuqiong Food, PepsiCo China's Weidongli, as well as Harbin Beer. He is also the China brand ambassador for international brands Pepsi, Gatorade, Hennessy, Head & Shoulders, Lay's, and Adidas. Wang is also the house ambassador for Louis Vuitton, and global ambassador for Guerlain, Yadea, and Bose.

== Other ventures ==
In December 2022, Wang launched his own fashion brand, D.DESIRABLE, holding 51% of the shares, with the remaining shares held by the spouse of the executive director of his management agency. In April 2024, the streetwear label opened its first permanent flagship store on Anfu Road in Shanghai, followed by a second retail store in Dongshankou, Guangzhou in August 2025. It has also collaborated with brands and designers including Feng Chen Wang, Lane Crawford, Fenty Beauty and Matthew M. Williams, and made its international debut with a pop-up store at ION Orchard in Singapore in partnership with the Singapore Tourism Board in January 2026.

== Filmography ==
=== Film ===
Year	English title	Chinese title	Role	Ref.
2023	Look Up and See Joy	抬头见喜	Guo Wenhan / Guo Zai	
2025	I Dreamed a Dream	青春梦	Didi	
2026	Per Aspera Ad Astra	星河入梦	Xu Tianbiao	

=== Television series ===
Year	English title	Chinese title	Role	Ref.
2018	Meteor Garden	流星花园	Daoming Si	
2020	Ever Night: War of Brilliant Splendours	将夜2	Ning Que	
2021	The Rational Life	理智派生活	Qi Xiao	
2021	Miss the Dragon	遇龙	Yuchi Longyan / Long Yuchi / Long Yan	
2022	Love Between Fairy and Devil	苍兰诀	Dongfang Qingcang	
2022	Unchained Love	浮图缘	Xiao Duo	
2023	Never Give Up	今日宜加油	Bai Mashuai	
2023	Youth in the Flames of War	战火中的青春	Cheng Jiashu	
2023	Only for Love	以爱为营	Shi Yan	
2024	Guardians of the Dafeng	大奉打更人	Xu Qi'an	
2026	Light to the Night	黑夜告白	Ran Fangxu	
TBA	Live Long and Prosper	咸鱼飞升	Song Qianji	
TBA	Empress Reborn	将门独后	Xie Jingxing	

=== Reality and variety shows ===
Year	English title	Chinese title	Role	Network	Ref.
2017	Super Idol	超次元偶像	Contestant	Youku	
2018	Super Penguin League Super3	超级企鹅联盟super3	Regular member	Tencent	
2018	The Inn 2	亲爱的客栈2	Cast member	Hunan TV	
2019	Super Nova Games 2	超新星全运会第二届	Regular member	iQiyi	
2019	Super Penguin League 2019	超级企鹅联盟2019	Regular member	Tencent	
2020	The Irresistible	元气满满的哥哥	Cast member	Hunan TV	
2020	The Summer Place	我在颐和园等你	Cast member	Beijing Satellite TV	
2020	Super Penguin League 2020	超级企鹅联盟2020	Regular member	Tencent	
2022	Hello, Saturday	你好星期六	Cast member	Hunan TV	
2022	Wonderland 2	五十公里桃花坞2	Cast member	Tencent	
2022	All-out Action	全力以赴的行动派	Cast member	Douyin	
2022	Basketball Buddies	打球嘛朋友	Cast member	Kuaishou	
2023	Hello Saturday	你好星期六	Cast member	Hunan TV	
2023	Wonderland 3	五十公里桃花坞3	Cast member	Tencent	
2024	Rap Star Dream Maker	说唱梦工厂	Observer cast	Youku	
2025	Wander Together	宇宙闪烁请注意	Cast member	iQiyi	
2026	The Inn 2026	亲爱的客栈2026	Cast member	Hunan TV	

== Discography ==
=== Digital singles ===
Year	English title	Chinese title	Notes	Ref.
2021	"Hello"	Hello	With Gibb-Z, GeorgeSlay	
2022		重庆得行	With Bridge, GAI and Zhang Yanqi	
2023	"Seaside Tango"	海边探戈	With Wang Qiming (WatchMe) and Pu Sha	
2024	"Burn"	烧	With Pu Sha	
2024	"Chasing Light"	逐光	With Zhang Hanyun	
2024	"Disco By The Lake"	湖边迪斯科	With Wang Qiming (WatchMe), Pu Sha and LSGCsikoriot	
2025	"Pretty"	Pretty		
2025	"Elegant"	优雅		
2025		是我 也是我们	Special music video for CMG New Year's Eve Gala (2025–2026)	
2026		铺天盖棣	With GAI	
2026	"Love, Exists 2026"	爱,存在2026	With Wei Qiqi (Kiki)	
2026	"Per Aspera Ad Astra"	星河入梦	With Victoria Song (Theme Song for the film Per Aspera Ad Astra)	
2026	"CY Freestyle"	CY Freestyle		
2026	"Super Villain"	Super Villain	With Huang Zitao	

=== Digital album ===
==== Dreams of Youth (少年梦) ====
- Released: 16 December 2024
- Label: Seewe Music
- Production: K Eleven

All tracks are written by Dylan Wang, Wang Qiming (WatchMe) and Pu Sha.

Track listing for Dreams of Youth (少年梦)
No.	Title	Performing artist	Length
1.	"避风塘"	Dylan Wang & Wang Qiming (WatchMe)	3:15
2.	"安全感"	Dylan Wang, Wang Qiming (WatchMe) and Pu Sha	2:48
3.	"小霸王"	Dylan Wang, Wang Qiming (WatchMe), Pu Sha and Bridge	3:06
4.	"No Fly Zone"	Dylan Wang, Wang Qiming (WatchMe) and Pu Sha	2:30
5.	"Trip to LA"	Dylan Wang and 24kGoldn	2:45
6.	"低级错误"	Dylan Wang, Wang Qiming (WatchMe) and Pu Sha	2:47
7.	"爬坡上坎"	Dylan Wang, Wang Qiming (WatchMe) and Pu Sha	3:44
8.	"命"	Dylan Wang, Pu Sha and L4WUDU	3:16
9.	"Dream Car"	Dylan Wang, Wang Qiming (WatchMe) and Pu Sha	2:55
10.	"如果哪天我不帅了"	Dylan Wang, Wang Qiming (WatchMe) and Pu Sha	3:56
Total length:			31:02

=== Original soundtracks ===
Year	English title	Chinese title	Album	Ref.
2017	"We Are Dreamers"		Super Idol OST	
2018	"For You"		Meteor Garden OST (with Darren Chen, Caesar Wu and Connor Leong)	
2018	"Creating Memories"	创造回忆	Meteor Garden OST (with Darren Chen, Caesar Wu and Connor Leong)	
2018	"Never Would've Thought of"	从来没想到	Meteor Garden OST (with Darren Chen, Caesar Wu and Connor Leong)	
2018	"Extremely Important"	非同小可	Meteor Garden OST	
2018	"Don't Even Have to Think About it"	想都不用想	Meteor Garden OST	
2019	"Magical Chinese Character"	神奇的汉字	Magical Chinese Character OST	
2019	"Miss Me"			
2020	"No Resentment"	不怨	Ever Night 2 OST (with Song Yiren)	
2021	"Understand"	懂	The Rational Life OST (with Qin Lan)	
2023		刚好2023	Wonderland 3 OST	
2023		321看	Hello, Saturday OST	
2026		宇宙爆闪天团	Wander Together OST	

== Accolades ==
Award	Year	Category	Result	Ref.
Golden Data Entertainment Awards	2019	Most Influential TV Drama Newcomer of the Year	Won	
GQ Men of the Year Awards	2022	Young Performer of the Year	Won	
Huading Awards	2022	Best Actor in Costume Drama	Nominated	
iQIYI Scream Night	2023	Scream God Actor Of The Year	Won	
Tencent Video Starlight Awards	2023	Rising Star of the Year Program	Won	
Tencent Video Starlight Awards	2023	VIP Star	Won	
Weibo TV & Internet Video Summit	2023	Notable Actor of the Year	Won	
Weibo Night	2023	Most Noteworthy Performer of the Year	Won	
Wenrong Awards	2023	Best Actor in a Youth Drama Series	Won	
Tencent Video Starlight Awards	2024	Most Popular TV Actor of the Year	Won	
Tencent Video Starlight Awards	2024	Most Influential Overseas Artist of the Year	Won	
Tencent Video Starlight Awards	2024	VIP Star of the Year	Won	
Weibo Night	2024	Annual Popular Actor Awards	Won	
Weibo TV & Internet Video Summit	2025	Performer of the Year	Won	
