= Calvin Li =

Chinese actor

Lǐ Zōnghàn
- 李宗翰
- Born: Lǐ Lì (李力); 7 November 1976 (age 49); Wuhan, Hubei, China
- Education: Central Academy of Drama
- Occupation: Actor
- Years active: 1985 - present
- Notable work: Hushed Roar; All Men Are Brothers

Calvin Li or Li Zonghan (Chinese: 李宗翰; pinyin: Lǐ Zōnghàn; born 7 November 1976) is a Chinese actor of Manchu ethnicity. Li is noted for his roles as Wu Yong and Yang Zhenjiang in the television series and film All Men Are Brothers and Hushed Roar respectively.

== Life ==
=== Early life ===
Li was born and raised in Wuhan, Hubei, his mother is a Beijing Opera actress. Li graduated from Central Academy of Drama, majoring in acting. He is also a trained dancer. He is a member of the Manchu's Aisin Gioro clan.

=== Acting career ===
Li began his career as an advertising model after graduation.

Li made his acting debut in the historical television series Zhuge Liang, playing Zhuge Zhan, the son of Zhuge Liang.

In 2010, Li played the character Wisdom and Monk Jian Hui in John Woo's Reign of Assassins, a wuxia film starring Michelle Yeoh, Jung Woo-sung, Wang Xueqi, Barbie Shu, Shawn Yue, and Kelly Lin. That same year, he also participated in Alan Mak and Felix Chong's The Lost Bladesman as Qin Qi, a subordinate of Cao Cao's general Xiahou Dun.

In 2011, Li co-starred with Huo Siyan and Charlie Young in the suspense film Sleepwalker as Eric, he received positive reviews. At the same year, Li starred as Wu Yong in the historical television series All Men Are Brothers, adapted from Shi Nai'an's classical novel Water Margin, the series was one of the most watched ones in mainland China in that year.

In 2012, Li was nomination for the Newly Improved Actor Award at the Chinese American Film Festival for his performance as Yang Zhenjiang in Hushed Roar.

== Works ==
=== Film ===
Year	Title	Chinese Title	Role	Notes
2010	Reign of Assassins	《剑雨》	Lu Zhu	
2010	The Lost Bladesman	《关云长》	Qin Qi	
2010	Four Hands	《面引子》	Sun Houcheng	
2010	Mid-Night Train	《午夜火车》	Hong Mao	
2011	The Dance of the Summer	《夏天的拉花》	Liu Xin	
2011	Sleepwalker	《梦游3D》	Eric	
2011	Hushed Roar	《咆哮无声》	Yang Zhenjiang	
2016	I Am Not Madame Bovary			

=== Television ===
Year	Title	Chinese Title	Role	Notes
1985	Zhuge Liang	《诸葛亮》	Zhuge Zhan	
1998		《悲欢岁月》	Song Guifu	
1998	Police World	《警坛风云》	Ma Ding	
1998	The Story of Hong Kong	《香港的故事》	He Yingjie	
1999		《沧海情仇》	Chen Zude	
1999		《波涛汹涌》	Jiang Bai	
1999		《全家福》	Zhou Dabao	
1999	Divorce	《离婚》	Zhang Tianzhen	
2000		《包公生死劫》	Wu Duan	
2000		《乱世奇侠》	Mao Xiaoqi	
2000	A Foot Set the Country	《一脚定江山》	Zhang Jun	
2001		《天边外》	Yu Jialin	
2001	Miracles	《奇迹》	Lin Zilong	
2001		《梧桐雨》	Xie Jiashu	
2001		《田教授家的28个房客》	Xu Gonglin	
2001		《天地有爱》	Shen Chaojun	
2002	The Adventures of Di Renjie	《护国良相狄仁杰之风摧边关》	Wu Guanlong	
2002		《中国经典名剧之牡丹亭》	Liu Mengmei	
2002		《非常保险档案》	Hua Sheng	
2002		《情义两重天》	Zhuang Wen	
2003	Young Imperial Envoy	《少年大钦差》	Zhang Guolong	
2003	The Tale of the Romantic Swordsman	《书剑情侠柳三变》	The Crown Prince	
2003	Dark War	《斩首行动》	Xiao Jijun	
2004	A Special Smile	《欢颜》	Yu Luojun	
2004	Happy Zhu Bajie	《喜气洋洋猪八戒》	Xiaotianquan	
2004		《婚前四周半》	Sang Nan	
2004		《爱人医事》	The CEO	
2004	Sword Rules the World	《剑临天下》	Zhan Zhao	
2005	Jasmine Flower	《茉莉花》	Lin Weixian	
2005	Maid Wan Xin	《徽娘宛心》	Wu Huixiang	
2005	Ruan Lingyu	《阮玲玉》	Zhang Damin	
2006	Sewing Maid	《绣娘兰馨》	Gu Chuanming	
2006	Stupid Kid	《笨小孩》	Sha Mao	
2006		《日月凌空》	Qiao Zhizhi	
2006		《爱就爱了》	Luo Wenkai	
2007	Torn Between Two Lovers	《幸福里九号》	Yang Weimin	
2007	The Shadow of Empress Wu	《新还君明珠》	Lin Zhiwen	
2008	Maid Mother	《保姆妈妈》	Ge Lin	
2008	Spring Goes, Spring Comes	《新春去春又回》	Zhang Laifu	
2009	Nancheng Regret	《南城遗恨》	Tang Hao	
2009		《不负天职》	The Doctor	
2009	Second Marriage	《再婚》	Chen Hai	
2009	After Marriage 30 Years	《婚后三十年》	Du Heping	
2011	White Lie	《真爱谎言》	Han Zhenyu	
2011	Jingde Town	《景德镇》	Zhang Tiansan	
2011	Painted Skin	《画皮》	Pang Yong	
2011	All Men Are Brothers	《水浒传》	Wu Yong	
2012	Filling Sichuan	《绝对忠诚》	Qiu Guorong	
2012	Legend of Tiger Tally	《虎符传奇》	The King of Qi	
2012	Million Brides 2	《百万新娘之爱无悔》	Wang Shaohua	
2013	Strange Stories from a Chinese Studio	《聊斋4》	Yu Jing	
2013	The Promise	《生死相依》	Lan Zhuo	
2013	Eight Immortals Prequel	《八仙前传》	Lü Dongbin	
2014	The Stand-In	《十月围城》	Fu Qi	
2014		《真爱谎言2爱你不放手》	Han Zhenyu	
2014		《乱世情碎大茶商》	Chen Qizhi	
2016	Grand Courtyard 1927	深宅1927	Second Son	also known as Deep Dwelling
2016	The Mystic Nine	老九门	Hei Bei the Sixth	
2017	The Legend of the Condor Heroes	射雕英雄传	Yang Tiexin	
2018	Mr. Right	恋爱先生	Song Ningyu	
2019	Chong Er's Preach	重耳传奇	Tai Hao	
2019	L.O.R.D. Critical World	爵迹·临界天下	Jie Mei	
2019	The Best Partner	精英律师		Cameo
2020	I Will Find You a Better Home	安家	Huo Yunxiao	
2020	Reborn	重生	Xue Dong	
2020	If Time Flows Back	如果岁月可回头	Huang Jiuheng	
2021	The Starting Line	起跑线	Gu Jiawei	
2021	The Rational Life	理智派生活	Xu Minjie	
TBA		修仙記之何仙姑傳		
TBA	Shanghai Picked Flowers	十年陽光十年華		

=== Drama ===
Year	Title	Chinese Title	Role	Notes
1994	Dance I have a date with Spring	《我和春天有个约会》	Shen Jiahao	
2008	The Red and the Black	《红与黑》	Julien	

== Awards ==
Year	Work	Award	Result	Notes
		3rd Sina TV Drama Rankings - Best Actor	Nominated	
2007		BQ Celebrity Score Award for Best Drama Artist	Won	
2011		6th Huading Award for Favorite Star	Won	
2011		BQ Celebrity Score Award for Favorite Actor	Nominated	
2013	Hushed Roar	Chinese American Film Festival - Newly Improved Actor	Won	
2018	—N/a	5th The Actors of China Award Ceremony - Outstanding Actor (Sapphire category)	Won	
2019	Frontier of Love	25th Shanghai Television Festival - Best Supporting Actor	Nominated	
