= Li Yunrui =

Chinese actor and singer (born 1996)

- Born: August 24, 1996 (age 30); Jingmen, Hubei, China
- Education: Huazhong University of Science and Technology
- Occupations: Actor; singer
- Years active: 2015–present
- Agent: Turn East Media
- Height: 182 cm (5 ft 11 1/2 in)

Chinese name
- Simplified Chinese: 李昀锐
- Hanyu Pinyin: Lǐ Yúnruì

Li Yunrui (Chinese: 李昀锐, born August 24, 1996) is a Chinese actor and singer. He is known for his roles in the film Creation of the Gods I: Kingdom of Storms (2023) and in the television series Love Like the Galaxy (2022), The Last Immortal (2023) and Blossom (2024).

== Early life ==
Li was born on August 24, 1996, in Jingmen, Hubei Province, China. He graduated from Huazhong University of Science and Technology with a degree in public administration.

== Discography ==
=== Soundtrack appearances ===
Year	Title	Album
2018	"Eventually Still a Secret" (终究还是秘密)	My Idol OST
2018	Butterfly Effect (蝴蝶效应)	My Idol OST
2021	"Final Destination " (终点)	Rebirth For You OST
2022	"Happy Like Me" (我般逍遥)	Love like the Galaxy OST
2023	"The Eve" (前夜)	The Eve OST
2024	"Between" (昭昭墨墨)	Blossom OST
2025	"Feast Begins" (喜宴开)	Yummy Yummy Yummy OST

== Filmography ==
=== Films ===
Year	Title	Role
2015	With You	Hua Lei
2018	Dragon's Kitchen	Zhu Daihe
2018	By Chance	Wang Akira
2021	Never Stop	Wu Tianyi
2021	My Son	Xiao Jiang
2023	Creation of the Gods I: Kingdom of Storms	E Shun
2025	Creation of the Gods II: Demon Force	E Shun

=== Television series ===
Year	Title		Role	Network	Notes	Ref.
Year	English	Chinese	Role	Network	Notes	Ref.
2018	My Idol	恋与偶像	Du Wang	iQIYI	Main role	
2021	Rebirth for You	嘉南传	Qing An	iQIYI, Tencent Video	Supporting role	
2022	The Oath of Love	余生，请多指教	Shao Jiang / Shi Ge	Hunan TV, Tencent Video	Supporting role	
2022	Love Like the Galaxy	星汉灿烂 / 月升沧海	Yuan Shen	Dragon TV, Tencent Video	Supporting role	
2022	Accidentally Meow on You	一不小心喵上你	Zhang Hao	iQIYI, Tencent Video	Supporting role	
2023	Parallel World	西出玉门	Gao Shen	Tencent Video	Supporting role	
2023	Scent of Time	为有暗香来	Wu Shuomo	Youku	Supporting role	
2023	The Last Immortal	神隐	Hong Yi / Ajiu	Mango TV, Tencent Video	Supporting role	
2024	She and Her Girls	山花烂漫时	Chen Chen	CCTV-1, Tencent Video	Guest appearance	
2024	Go Back Lover	再见, 怦然心动	Lu Xingyan	Tencent Video	Main role	
2024	Blossom	九重紫	Song Mo, courtesy name "Yantang"	Tencent Video	Main role	
2025	Reopen My Journals	致1999年的自己	Xiao Han	Tencent Video	Main role	
2025	Perfect Match	五福临门	Li Changan	Hunan TV, Mango TV	Guest appearance	
2025	Yummy Yummy Yummy	宴遇永安	Lin Yan	Tencent Video	Main role	
2026	Generation to Generation	江湖夜雨十年灯	Mu Zhengming / Mu Zhengyang	Tencent Video	Guest appearance	
2026	Rebirth	冰湖重生	Zhuge Yue	iQIYI, Tencent Video	Main role	
2026	Dazzling	耀眼	Xing Wu	Hunan TV, Mango TV	Main role	
2026	Tigers Sniff the Rose	尚公主	Yan Shang	Tencent Video	Main role	
TBA	Combined Arms	合成令	Lu Yihang	Tencent Video	Main role	
TBA	Sea of No Return	归良辰	Yuwen Liangshi	Youku	Main role	

=== Variety shows ===
Year	Title	Role	Notes	Ref.
2019	Produce Camp 2019	Contestant	Finished 19th	
2020	Super Penguin League; Season 3	Player		
2026	Natural High: Season 4	Guest	Ep: 5	

== Awards and nominations ==
Year	Award	Category	Nominee(s)/Work(s)	Result	Ref.
2023	Tencent Video Star Awards	Promising Actor of the Year	Li Yunrui	Won	
2025	Tencent Video Star Awards	Quality Artist of the Year	Li Yunrui	Won	
2025	Tencent Video Star Awards	VIP Star Award	Li Yunrui	Won	
