= Shen Yujie =

Chinese actress (born 2001)

- Born: October 11, 2001 (age 24); Jinhua, Zhejiang, China
- Other name: Jocelyn
- Education: Beijing Film Academy
- Occupation: Actress
- Years active: 2022–present
- Agent: Gramarie
- Height: 170 cm (5 ft 7 in)

Chinese name
- Simplified Chinese: 沈羽洁
- Hanyu Pinyin: Shěn Yǔjié

Shen Yujie (Chinese: 沈羽洁; pinyin: Shěn Yǔjié, born October 11, 2001) is a Chinese actress. She is best known for her roles in Only For Love (2023), and Coroner's Diary (2025). She was admitted into Beijing Film Academy in 2019 and graduated in 2023.

== Filmography ==
=== Television series ===
Year	Title	Role	Notes	Ref.
2022	Checkmate	Zou Jingxuan		
2023	The Fearless	Xia Shu		
2023	Only For Love	Qin Shiyue		
2024	Hard to Find	Feng Yuan		
2025	The Fearless 2	Xia Shu		
2025	Double Fugue	Qin Yuebai		
2025	Coroner's Diary	Yue Ning / Princess Yongning		
TBA	My Queen, My Rules	Ji Mingshu		
TBA	City of Burns	Zhou Ye		
TBA	Shadow Punisher	Bai Zhenzhu		
TBA	The Leading Stars	Ba Yunye		

== Awards and nominations ==
Year	Award	Category	Nominee(s)/Work(s)	Result	Ref.
2025	iQIYI Scream Night	Potential Actor of the Year	Shen Yujie	Won	
