= Empress Reborn =

- 将门独后
- Genre: Historical drama; Political drama; Romance
- Based on: The Rebirth of the Malicious Empress of Military Lineage by Qian Shan Cha Ke
- Written by: Ye Yang; Cheng Le
- Directed by: Yin Tao
- Starring: Wang Hedi; Meng Ziyi
- Country of origin: China
- Original language: Mandarin

Production
- Production locations: Hengdian World Studios; Gansu
- Production companies: New Classics Media; Tencent Video; Yuewen Media

Original release
- Network: Tencent Video

Empress Reborn (Chinese: 将门独后; pinyin: Jiàngmén dúhòu) is an upcoming Chinese historical television series directed by Yin Tao and starring Dylan Wang and Meng Ziyi. It is adapted from the web novel Chong Sheng Zhi Jiang Men Du Hou (Chinese: 重生之将门毒后) by Qian Shan Cha Ke. The series is expected to air on Tencent Video and WeTV.

== Plot ==
The series follows Shen Miao, a disgraced empress who is reborn as a teenager with memories of her previous life, and Xie Jingxing, a seemingly carefree young marquis whose hidden identity and political ambitions become closely intertwined with her own. Determined to protect her immediate family and change the course of her life, Shen Miao becomes entangled in court intrigue and shifting alliances, while Xie Jingxing pursues his own ambitions amid the struggles for power. As they uncover secrets surrounding their pasts, the two join forces to navigate the ruthless infighting within the imperial court and reshape their destinies.

== Cast ==
=== Leading ===
- Dylan Wang as Xie Jingxing (谢景行)
- Meng Ziyi as Shen Miao (沈妙)

=== Special appearance ===
- Yao Chi as Pei Lang (裴琅)
- Wang Tonghui as Shen Wan (沈万)
- Snow Kong as Shen Yue (沈玥)
- Yang Shize as Fu Xiuyi (傅修宜)
- Zheng Hehuizi as Shen Dongling (沈冬菱)
- Yue Yang as Shen Gui (沈贵)
- Xiu Qing as Shen Xin (沈信)
- Sui Junbo as Chen Ruoqiu (陈若秋)
- Gong Beibi as Luo Xueyan (罗雪雁)
- Wen Zhengrong as Ren Wanyun (任婉云)

=== Supporting ===
- Yu Yang as Emperor Wenhui (文惠帝)
- Deng Kai as Huangfu Hao (皇甫灏)
- Wang Runze as Su Mingfeng (苏明枫)
- You Jingru as He Qingwei (何晴薇)
- Bai Shu as Prince Zhou (周王)
- Liu Min as Wan Yiniang (万姨娘)
- Sun Xuening as Li Ke (李柯)
- Liu Weiwei as TBA
- Wu Yuheng as Li Yushu (李羽书)
- Li Daikun as Shen Yuan (沈垣)
- Li Yixiao as TBA
- Zhang Yanyan as TBA
- Zhang Lei as Ye Maochun (叶茂春)
- Chen Heyi as Luo Ling (罗凌)
- Yan Jie as Luo Lianying (罗连营)
- Geng Le as Xie Ding (谢鼎)
- Guo Weijie as Shen Qing (沈清)
- Xu Meiling as Old Lady Shen
- Xu Haiqiao as Xie Zhuo (谢炽)
- Guo Yunqi as TBA
- Ren Youlun as Gaoyang (高阳)
- Lan Ling as Luo Tan (罗潭)
- Qi Yuchen as Feng Anning (冯安宁)
- He Lei as Shen Qiu (沈丘)
- Wei Zixin as Prince Yu (豫亲王)

== Production ==
=== Development ===
Empress Reborn is adapted from the web novel Chong Sheng Zhi Jiang Men Du Hou (重生之将门毒后) by Qian Shan Cha Ke, which began serialisation in 2015 on Chinese online literature platform Xiaoxiang Academy. The series is directed by Yin Tao and jointly produced by Tencent Video, New Classics Media and Yuewen Media.

=== Casting ===
Dylan Wang and Meng Ziyi were cast in the leading roles. The full cast was announced following the completion of filming in July 2026.

=== Filming ===
Principal photography began on 20 February 2026 and concluded on 29 July 2026, lasting 153 days. Filming took place at Hengdian World Studios and on location at the Yellow River Stone Forest in Gansu, where battle sequences were filmed. The series entered post-production following the completion of filming. The first trailer of the drama series was released on 28 October 2026 at Tencent Video's Shanghai Investment Conference.
