= Are You Lonesome Tonight? (film) =

- Chinese: 热带往事
- Directed by: Wen Shipei
- Written by: Zhao Binghao; Wang Yinuo; Wen Shipei; Noé Dodson
- Produced by: Hu Jingxuan; Wang Jing
- Starring: Eddie Peng; Sylvia Chang
- Cinematography: Andreas Thalhammer; Xiaosu Han; Cedric Cheung-Lau; Zhang Heng
- Edited by: Zhu Lin; Will Wei; Dong Jie; Noé Dodson; Cao Hangchen
- Music by: Hank Lee
- Production company: Dirty Monkeys Studios
- Release date: June 21, 2021 (China)
- Running time: 95 minutes
- Country: China
- Language: Chinese
- Box office: US$6.9 million

Are You Lonesome Tonight? (Chinese: 热带往事) is a 2021 Chinese neo-noir film directed by Wen Shipei and starring Eddie Peng and Sylvia Chang.

== Plot ==
In 1997, an air conditioner repairman accidentally hits a man with his car late at night and decides to cover it up. He later meets the victim's widow and befriends her. A police detective investigates the case when the body is found riddled with bullets.

== Cast ==
- Eddie Peng
- Sylvia Chang
- Wang Yanhui
- Zhang Yu
- Jiang Peiyao
- Lu Xin
- Chen Yongzhong
- Deng Fei

== Production ==
This was director Wen Shipei's first feature-length film, after having previously directed two short films in 2015 and 2016. The basis for the film came from a pitch at the 2017 Shanghai International Film Festival. Shipei has said that the story was inspired by his father, who was a petty criminal in the 1990s. The film takes its English-language title from the song "Are You Lonesome Tonight?" which appears in the film, whereas the Chinese-language title translates as "Tropical Memories".

== Release ==
The film was released theatrically in China on June 21, 2021. The film was shown at the 2021 Cannes Film Festival and the 2021 Toronto International Film Festival.

== Box office ==
The film grossed US$6.9 million in theaters.

== Critical reception ==
On the review aggregator website Rotten Tomatoes, 100% of 12 critics' reviews are positive, with an average rating of 7.90/10. Several critics compared the film to the works of director Wong Kar-wai. Bobby Lepire, writing for Film Threat, compared the visual style of the film to Blade Runner.

== Accolades ==
The film was nominated for a Caméra d'Or at Cannes and received an audience award at the San Sebastián International Film Festival.
