= Liu Yaowen =

Chinese singer, songwriter, actor (born 2005)

- 刘耀文
- Born: September 23, 2005 (age 20); Chongqing, China
- Occupations: Singer; songwriter; actor
- Years active: 2017–present
- Musical career
- Genres: Pop
- Instrument: Vocals
- Label: TF Entertainment
- Member of: Teens In Times (TNT)
- Formerly of: Typhoon Teens (TYT)

Chinese name
- Traditional Chinese: 劉耀文
- Simplified Chinese: 刘耀文
Transcriptions
Standard Mandarin
- Hanyu Pinyin: Liú Yàowén

Liu Yaowen (simplified Chinese: 刘耀文; traditional Chinese: 劉耀文; pinyin: Liú Yàowén; born September 23, 2005) is a Chinese singer, songwriter, and actor. He is a member of the boy group Teens In Times (TNT) under TF Entertainment.

Born in Chongqing, Liu began training with TF Entertainment in 2016 and debuted as part of the boy group Typhoon Teens (TYT) in 2018 before joining Teens In Times in 2019. As a solo artist, he released his first single, "Got You", in 2021, followed by several singles and his debut EP K·Night in 2025. In addition to his music career, Liu has appeared in film and television, including Zhang Yimou's Article 20 (2024), for which he was nominated for Best New Actor at the 37th Hundred Flowers Awards.

== Life and career ==
=== 2005–2018: Early life and trainee years ===
Liu was born on September 23, 2005, in Chongqing, China. In 2016, he joined TF Family, a trainee program under TF Entertainment. On August 12, 2017, Liu made his first public appearance at the TF Family Summer Carnival. The same year, he made his acting debut in TF Family's self-produced web drama Second Life, portraying the character Daxia. On May 11, 2018, he appeared in another TF Family production, Obsessed with Heart, playing the role of young Lin Dongyang.

=== 2018–2019: Debut with Typhoon Teens ===
On October 7, 2018, Liu officially debuted as a member of the boy group Typhoon Teens (TYT) during their first concert in Chongqing. On January 1, 2019, he performed with the group at the CCTV New Year's Eve Gala, singing the opening song "Love Each Other" alongside Wang Jieshi and others. On February 4, 2019, he made his first appearance at the CCTV Spring Festival Gala, performing "Youth Imagination" with Han Xue, Guan Xiaotong, and others.

=== 2019–present: Work with Teens In Times and solo activities ===
In July 2019, Typhoon Teens disbanded and reorganized. Liu subsequently joined Teens In Times (TNT) through the reality program Typhoon Teens: Battle of Transformation. Following the reorganization, Liu continued his career as a member of Teens In Times. On February 11, 2021, Liu performed with TNT at the CCTV Spring Festival Gala, singing "Running Youth" alongside Dilraba Dilmurat and Li Xian.

On September 23, 2021, he released his first solo single, "Got You", showcasing his musical potential outside of group activities. On May 20, 2022, Liu released his solo single "Falling You", which broke two records on the TME UNI Chart, he became the youngest artist to top the chart twice and achieved the highest score for a post-2000s artist. On September 10, 2022, he performed "We Will Be Better" at the CCTV Mid-Autumn Festival Gala with Wong Cho-lam.

On February 10, 2024, the Zhang Yimou-directed film Article 20, starring Ma Li and Lei Jiayin, was released, featuring Liu in the role of Han Yuchen. His performance earned him a nomination for Best New Actor at the 37th Hundred Flowers Awards.

On March 24, 2025, Liu released his first EP, K·Night.

== Discography ==
=== EP ===
- K·Night (耀) (2025)

=== Singles ===
Title	Year	Peak chart positions
Title	Year	CHN TME
"The Dream" (with Yan Haoxiang)	2019	--
"Got You"	2021	1
"Falling You"	2022	1
"Yú" (瑜) (with Zhang Zhenyuan and Yan Haoxiang)	2022	6
"No Hibernation" (不冬眠)	2022	1
"You Deserve to Shine" (耀眼的你)	2023	1
"Feel Me"	2023	1
"Blue"	2023	3
"Last Night"	2024	2
"One More Night"	2024	1
"Sugar"	2024	1

=== Other charted songs ===
Title	Year	Peak chart positions	Album
Title	Year	CHN TME	Album
"Grey Monster" (孤独怪物) (with Ding Chengxin, Yan Haoxiang, and He Junlin)	2023	11	Teens in Utopia (乌托邦少年)
"Starry Night" (烟花升停在星夜) (with Song Yaxuan)	2023	1	Teens in Utopia (乌托邦少年)
"Nighty Night" (晚安)	2025	9	K·Night (耀)
"FlexXX" (炫)	2025	1	K·Night (耀)
"Trauma" (伤)	2025	17	K·Night (耀)
"In Two" (迷雾)	2025	15	K·Night (耀)
"Kill Night" (耀)	2025	1	K·Night (耀)

== Filmography ==
=== Films ===
Year	Title	Role
2024	Article 20 (第二十条)	Han Yuchen
2026	Scare Out (惊蛰无声)	Jian Hao

=== Web series ===
Year	Title	Role
2017	Second Life (第二人生)	Daxia
2018	Obsessed with Heart (念念)	Lin Dongyang (young)

=== Variety show (regular cast) ===
Year	Title
2019	TYT Go (台风少年行)
2021	Go Shoot! (接招吧！前辈)
2022	The Detectives' Adventures 2 (萌探探探案2)
2022	Memories Beyond Horizon (无限超越班)
2023	Run for Time 2023 (全员加速中2023)
2025	This Is My Adventure (这是我的西游)
2025	We Are the Champions 4 (战至巅峰第四季)
2025	Wander Together (宇宙闪烁请注意)

== Awards and nominations ==
Award	Year	Category	Result	Ref.
China Movie Channel M-Chart Awards	2024	New Actor of the Year	Won	
Weibo Movie Night	2024	Breakthrough Actor of the Year	Won	
China Movie Channel Media Awards	2024	Most Media Attention New Actor	Nominated	
Hundred Flowers Awards	2024	Best New Actor	Nominated	
Golden Flowering Awards	2024	Most Promising Actor	Nominated	
China Screen Awards	2025	New Actor of the Year	Won	
