= Lei Jiayin =

Chinese actor

- 雷佳音
- Born: August 29, 1983 (age 43); Tiedong District, Anshan, Liaoning, China
- Education: Shanghai Theatre Academy
- Occupation: Actor
- Years active: 2004–present
- Agent: SMG Pictures
- Known for: Brotherhood of Blades; Brotherhood of Blades II: The Infernal Battlefield; Scare Out
- Spouse: Zhai Xufei
- Children: 1

Lei Jiayin (Chinese: 雷佳音; pinyin: Léi Jiāyīn; born August 29, 1983) is a Chinese actor best known for his roles in the films Guns and Roses (2012), How Long Will I Love U (2018), A Writer's Odyssey (2021), Full River Red (2023), and YOLO (2024), as well as the television series The First Half of My Life (2017), The Longest Day in Chang'an (2019), and A Lifelong Journey (2022).

Lei ranked 62nd on Forbes China Celebrity 100 list in 2019, and 61st in 2020.

== Early life ==
Lei Jiayin was born in Tiedong District, Anshan, Liaoning, China. He dropped out of school when he was in junior high. Later, Lei Jiayin went to Shenyang for an interview to take part in the model examination upon his mother's suggestion. While he was waiting for the interview, actor Lv Xiaohe took a fancy to him and suggested that he learn acting. In 2002, Lei Jiayin was admitted to Shanghai Theatre Academy with his results ranked second nationwide. In 2006, Lei entered the Shanghai Dramatic Arts Center.

== Career ==
=== 2004–2010: Beginning ===
In 2004, Lei Jiayin acted in the costume comedy drama Pretty Girls in Jianghu, which was his first time to act in the TV series, thus officially entering the entertainment industry.

In 2007, Lei starred in the family drama Lost. In the same year, he starred alongside Guo Jingfei in the wuxia comedy theater play My Own Swordsman.

In 2009, Lei made his big screen debut in the movie 1977 College Entrance Examination. Later, he starred alongside Yao Chen in the romantic comedy Days with the Air Hostess. In the same year, he starred in the workplace comedy Go Lala Go. In addition, he also co-starred with Yao Chen in the theater play Go Lala Go.

In 2010, he acted in the theater play 21 Karat directed by He Nian, and 12 Angry Men adapted from the American film of the same name. In the same year, he starred in the romance comedy Princess Single Blind Date in Mind.

=== 2011–2015: Rising popularity ===
In 2011, Lei starred in the highly popular family drama Home Temptation. In the same year, Lei starred in the revolutionary drama Borrow Gun. He won the most promising newcomer award of the 15th Zolin Drama Arts Awards.

In 2012, Lei starred in the action comedy Guns and Roses, which was his first leading role in a film. He won the Best Actor Award in the 11th Changchun Film Festival, and the Best New Actor in the 7th Chinese Young Generation Film Forum Awards for his performance. In the same year, Lei acted in the family drama Mother-in-Law is Here, and family comedy Baby. He won the Best New Actor award at the 3rd LeTV Awards.

In 2013, Lei starred alongside Tong Liya in the urban melodrama Weaning, which was his first time using a dialect in a television series.

In 2015, Lei starred alongside Yuan Shanshan in the family drama The Nanny Man. In the same year, he starred in crime suspense film Memento Mori, where he played a lawyer.

=== 2017–present: Breakthrough and continued success ===
In 2017, Lei starred in the romance television series The First Half of My Life adapted from the original novel by Hong Kong female writer Yi Shu. The television series was a major ratings hit in China and Lei gained increased recognition with his portrayal. He then starred in period television series White Deer Plain adapted from Chen Zhongshi's representative work of the same name. In April, Lei starred in the wuxia film Brotherhood of Blades II: The Infernal Battlefield, Lei earned critical acclaim for his performance, and was shortlisted for the Best Supporting Actor Award in the 54th Golden Horse Film Festival and Awards. Lei also starred alongside Deng Jiajia in modern workplace drama White Elite.

In 2018, Lei starred in the fantasy romance comedy film How Long Will I Love U, which was produced by Xu Zheng. Lei then starred alongside Liu Ye in modern romance series Old Boy. The same year, Lei starred in the spy drama Peace Hotel as the courageous and resourceful hero Wang Dading.

In 2019, Lei starred alongside Tang Wei in the film The Whistleblower. Lei also starred alongside Jackson Yee in the historical mystery web series The Longest Day in Chang'an, which was adapted from Ma Boyong's novel of the same name.

From 2019, Lei has been a permanent cast member on Chinese variety game show Go Fighting!

Lei starred alongside Yang Mi in the fantasy suspense film Assassin in Red which was directed by Lu Yang. The film is set to be released in 2020.

== Personal life ==
In 2010, Lei Jiayin married his classmate Zhai Xufei and they have a daughter named Lei Xiaobei.

== Filmography ==
=== Film ===
Year	English title	Chinese title	Role	Notes/Ref.
2009	Examination 1977	高考1977	A San	
2012	Guns and Roses	黄金大劫案	Xiao Dongbei	
2014	Breakup Buddies	心花路放	gangster	Cameo
2016	Memento Mori	记忆碎片	Da Ming	
2017	Brotherhood of Blades II: The Infernal Battlefield	绣春刀II：修罗战场	Pei Lun	
2017	Wished	反转人生	policeman	Cameo
2018	How Long Will I Love U	超时空同居	Lu Ming / Lu Shiyi	
2019	Crazy Alien	疯狂的外星人	policeman	Cameo
2019	The Wandering Earth	流浪地球	Yi Ge	Cameo
2019	Coward Hero	鼠胆英雄	Second chief of Qinglong Gang	Cameo
2019	My People, My Country	我和我的祖国	Lü Xiaoran's Ex	Segment: "One for All"
2019	The Whistleblower	吹哨人	Ma Ke	
2019	The Wild Goose Lake	南方车站的聚会	Ma Ke	
2020	My People, My Homeland	我和我的家乡	Jiang Dalei	
2021	A Writer's Odyssey	刺杀小说家	Guan Ning	
2021	Cliff Walkers	悬崖之上	Xie Zirong	Cameo
2021	Schemes in Antiques	古董局中局	Xu Yuan	
2023	Full River Red	满江红	Qin Hui	Cameo
2023	Five Hundred Miles	交换人生	Zhong Da	
2023	Under the Light	坚如磐石	Su Jianming	
2024	Article 20	第二十条	Han Ming	
2024	YOLO	热辣滚烫	Hao Kun	
2024	She’s Got No Name	酱园弄	Xue Zhiwu	
2024	The Hutong Cowboy	爆款好人	Qin Hui Actor	
2025	You Are the Best	你行！你上！	Second Uncle	
2025	A Writer’s Odyssey 2	刺杀小说家2	Guan Ning / Tong Hu	
2026	Take Off	飞行家	Tang Seng	
2026	Scare Out	惊蛰无声	Li Nan	
2026	I Know Who You Are	抓特务	Xiao Dali	

=== Television series ===
Year	English title	Chinese title	Role	Notes/Ref.
2004	Pretty Girls in Jianghu	江湖俏佳人	Yuan Bing	cameo
2007	Lost	迷路	Li Haolin	
2010	Days with the Air Hostess	和空姐在一起的日子	Xiao Jun	
2010	Go Lala Go	杜拉拉升职记	John Chang	
2010	Princess Single Blind Date in Mind	单身公主相亲记	Chang Sheng	
2011	Home Temptation	回家的诱惑	Lin Yide	
2011	Borrow Gun	借枪	Xiong Luocheng	
2012	Psychological Attack	攻心	Lin Shucheng	
2012	Mother-in-Law is Here	丈母娘来了	Liu Bo	
2012	King of Legend	传奇之王	A Fu	
2013	Baby	宝贝	Chen Jianya	
2013	Weaning	断奶	Li Junpeng	
2013	Longmen Express	龙门镖局	Gong Xiangzhao	cameo
2013	Feige The Big Hero	飞哥大英雄	Liang Fei	
2015	My Wife is The Queen	我的媳妇是女王	Tang Shuai	
2015	The Nanny Man	我爱男保姆	Fang Yuan	
2015	Mission Impossible Love	爱情碟中谍	Che Zijun	
2015	Ladies and Boys	淑女涩男		cameo
2015	Darker II	暗黑者第二季		cameo
2016	Love is So Beautiful	恋爱真美	Jia Libin	
2016	Red Star Over China	红星耀中国	Xi Zhongxun	cameo
2017	White Deer Plain	白鹿原	Lu Zhaopeng	
2017	The First Half of My Life	我的前半生	Chen Junsheng	
2017	With Elite	我不是精英	Mi Yang	
2018	Peace Hotel	和平饭店	Wang Adding	
2018	Old Boy	老男孩	She Fei	
2019	The Longest Day in Chang'an	长安十二时辰	Zhang Xiaojing	
2019	The Best Partner	精英律师		Cameo
2020	Together	在一起		
2021	Medal of the Republic	功勋	Yu Min	
TBA	Challenges at Midlife	落花时节	Jian Hongcheng	

=== Variety shows ===
Year	English title	Chinese title	Role	Notes/Ref.
2019	Go Fighting!	极限挑战5	Cast member	Season 5
2020	Go Fighting!	极限挑战6	Cast member	Season 6

== Awards and nominations ==
Year	Award	Category	Nominated work	Result	Ref.
2011	15th Zolin Drama Arts Awards	Rising Actor Award	—N/a	Won	
2012	3rd LeTV Awards	Best New Actor	—N/a	Won	
2012	7th Chinese Young Generation Film Forum Awards	Best New Actor	Guns and Roses	Won	
2012	11th Changchun Film Festival	Best Actor	Guns and Roses	Won	
2013	4th Golden Phoenix Awards	New Actor Award	Guns and Roses	Won	
2013	5th China TV Drama Awards	Rising Actor	—N/a	Won	
2017	54th Golden Horse Awards	Best Supporting Actor	Brotherhood of Blades II: The Infernal Battlefield	Nominated	
2017	11th Tencent Video Star Awards	Word-of-mouth TV Actor	—N/a	Won	
2017	Jinri Toutiao "Super Star" Award Ceremony	Rising Actor	—N/a	Won	
2018	11th China TV Drama Awards	Breakthrough Television Actor	—N/a	Won	
2018	24th Shanghai Television Festival	Best Actor	The First Half of My Life	Nominated	
2018	8th China Movie Channel Media Awards	Best Actor	How Long Will I Love U	Nominated	
2018	31st Tokyo International Film Festival - Gold Crane Award	Best Actor	How Long Will I Love U	Won	
2018	24th Huading Awards	Best Actor (Contemporary Drama)	Peace Hotel	Won	
2019	24th Busan International Film Festival	Asian Contents Awards - Best Actor	The Longest Day in Chang'an	Won	
2019	6th The Actors of China Award Ceremony	Best Actor (Web series)	The Longest Day in Chang'an	Nominated	
2019	3rd Yinchuan Internet Film Festival	Best Actor (Web series)	The Longest Day in Chang'an	Won	
2019	26th Huading Awards	Best Actor	The Longest Day in Chang'an	Nominated	
2019	26th Huading Awards	Top Ten Favorite Actors	The Longest Day in Chang'an	Won	
2019	Golden Bud - The Fourth Network Film And Television Festival	Best Actor	The Longest Day in Chang'an	Nominated	
2019	8th China Student Television Festival	Most Watched Actor	The Longest Day in Chang'an	Won	
2020	Best Choice of Multi-Screen Communication	Influential Actor	The Longest Day in Chang'an	Won	
2020	Weibo Awards Ceremony	Influential Actor of the Year	—N/a	Won	
2020	26th Shanghai Television Festival	Best Actor	The Longest Day in Chang'an	Nominated	
