= Song Yaxuan =

Chinese artist, idol, and singer

- Born: Song Yaxuan; March 4, 2004 (age 22); Binzhou, Shandong, China
- Other names: Alex Song, Song Shuli
- Education: The Central Academy of Drama
- Occupations: Singer; actor
- Years active: 2015–present
- Musical career
- Genres: Mandopop; C-pop
- Instrument: Vocals
- Label: Time Fengjun Entertainment
- Member of: TNT
- Formerly of: Typhoon Teens

Chinese name
- Traditional Chinese: 宋亞軒
- Simplified Chinese: 宋亚轩
Transcriptions
Standard Mandarin
- Hanyu Pinyin: Sòng Yà Xuān

Song Yaxuan (Chinese: 宋亚轩; born March 4, 2004) is a Chinese singer, actor, and producer. He is a member of the Chinese boy band TNT, which debuted on November 23, 2019.

== Early life and education ==
Song Yaxuan was born on March 4, 2004, in Binzhou City, Shandong, China. He grew up with his grandparents until age six when he moved to Guangzhou with his parents. He attended elementary school and middle school in Guangzhou. He attended high school at Bashu Secondary School in Chongqing.

On June 25, 2022, Wu Tong, director of Zhejiang TV variety shows The Detectives' Adventures and Ace vs. Ace, congratulated Song on Weibo for passing the 2022 Gaokao exams. Song Yaxuan's achievement was confirmed and covered by multiple news and media articles. Early in 2022, He ranked 11th in the audition for arts student at The Central Academy of Drama majoring in Acting and Performance and is a current student.

== Career ==
=== 2015–2016: Pre-Trainee Years ===
In 2015, Song Yaxuan entered the singing contest STAR-CHINA and won the Starry Award at the age of eleven. Later in 2015, he joined a kid's variety program on Guangdong Cartoon Network called It's Really Fun!

In early 2016, he made his debut on BRTV's music variety "Master Class" and earned public attention throughout China for his cover of Brightest Star in the Night Sky originally sung by Chinese indie-rock band Escape Plan.

Throughout the year, Song Yaxuan had been performing in various occasions like charity shows held in the Great Hall of People singing his cover of the Brightest Star in the Night Sky on BRTV's food variety. He also performed on a large scale CCTV program called the First Class of a New Semester.

=== 2016–2018: Trainee at TF Entertainment ===
On November 1, 2016, Song Yaxuan joined Times Fengjun Entertainment (TF Entertainment) and attended the company's self-made program "The Typhoon Talk" and "Friday Trainees".

On April 14, 2017, Song Yaxuan performed Blossomy on the TV Show Tian Tian Xiang Shang. In September 2017, Song Yaxuan was an actor in TF Entertainment's self-made series The Second Life (第二人生). On October 16, 2017, Song Yaxuan performed, with 9 others, the song "Journal of Superboys" on Happy Camp and at the Spring Festival Gala Audition by the end of 2017.

He also performed at the MangoTV New Year countdown live for 2018. In May 2018, Song Yaxuan was an actor in TF Entertainment's self-made drama Obsessed With Heart (念念), and sang the show's theme song "You and Me" (你我) with fellow trainees Ma Jiaqi and Zhang Zhenyuan.

=== 2018–2019: Typhoon Teens (TYT) ===
On October 7, 2018, Song Yaxuan made his debut as a member of Typhoon Teens (TYT) along with Yao Jinyuan, Ding Chengxin, Ma Jiaqi, and Liu Yaowen with the release of their first single "Wake Up".

In February 2019, Song Yaxuan performed live at the Spring Festival Gala with TYT. On February 16, 2019, Song Yaxuan performed in TYT's first and only concert, V5. On July 19, 2019, Song Yaxuan participated in TF Entertainment's reality TV show Typhoon Project to determine who will be assigned to the new boy group after Typhoon Teens was disbanded.

=== 2019–present: Teens in Times (TNT) ===
On August 25, 2019, Song Yaxuan ranked third in Typhoon Project. On November 23, 2019, Song Yaxuan made his second debut as a member of Teens in Times (TNT) with Ma Jiaqi, Ding Chengxin, Liu Yaowen, Zhang Zhenyuan, Yan Haoxiang, and He Junlin.

On January 29, 2021, Song Yaxuan joined as a semi-permanent guest host for the show Ace vs. Ace for Season 6. Song also became the host for its derivative show "Ace Boy Loading". On May 28, 2021, Song Yaxuan was a guest on the variety show The Detectives' Adventures. In 2022, Song Yaxuan sang in the 2022 Beijing Winter Olympics' theme song "The Most Beautiful Chinese Painting". On February 25, 2022, Song Yaxuan became main host for "Ace Boy Loading" in Ace vs. Ace Season 7. On March 23, 2022, Song Yaxuan became a main host on the television program "Three Boys".

On May 2, 2023, Song Yaxuan held the "Journey Of Utopia" Concert in Haikou with TNT. On November 18–19, 2023, Song Yaxuan held the "Building Beyond Building" 4th Anniversary Concert in Macau with TNT. On May 3–4, 2024, Song Yaxuan held the "Building Within Building" Concert in Chongqing with TNT. On August 16–17, 23–24, 2024, Song Yaxuan held the "Floors over Buildings" Concert in Changzhou and Macau with TNT.

== Personal life ==
Song Yaxuan has a brother who is eight years younger.

== Filmography ==
=== Television series ===
Date aired	Platform	Title	Character name	Note(s)	Ref.
September 29, 2017	Bilibili	The Second Life	Song Xuan	TF Entertainment self-made series	
May 11, 2018	Tencent	Nian Nian	Lin said (childhood)	TF Entertainment self-made series	

=== Short films ===
Date aired	Platform	Title	Character name	Director	Ref.
June 2, 2022	TikTok, Bilibili	Waiting for the Rain to Stop	Song Xuan	Cattree	

=== Variety shows ===
Year	Platform	Program	Role	Ref.
2021	Zhejiang Satellite TV	Ace vs. Ace: Season 6	Host of derivative show Ace Boy Loading	
2021	Ai Qiyi	The Detectives' Adventures	Member of the "Detective Family"	
2022	Zhejiang Satellite TV	Ace vs. Ace: Season 7	Host of derivative show Ace Boy Loading	
2022	Zhejiang Satellite TV	Three Boys	Main Host	
2023–2024	Zhejiang Satellite TV	Ace vs. Ace: Season 8	Main Host	
2023–2024	Mango TV	Infinity and Beyond	Singer, Winner of "Most Promising Young Singer" Award	
2024	Tencent WeTV	Natural High; Season 2: Lets Go Now	Main Host	

=== Television commercials ===
Date aired	Platform	Brand name	Note	Ref.
2022	Zhejiang Satellite TV	VIVO×JingDong Special Z	From Ace vs. Ace: Season 7	

=== Stage drama (Plays) ===
Date	Show name	Character	Note	Ref.
2022	Raging Water to the East	Eighth Group Army Service Officer	Organized by The Central Academy of Drama	
2023	Sunrise	Huang Xingsan	Organized by The Central Academy of Drama	
2024	Macbeth	Macbeth	Organized by The Central Academy of Drama	

== Discography ==
=== Singles ===
Release date	Title	Peak chart position	Ref.
2023.3.4	5:23PM	1	
2024.3.25	Heartbreak Circulation	1	
2024.12.2	Tender Winter	1	
2024.3.3	spr.	1	

== Other ventures ==
=== Fashion ===
On April 12, 2021, Song Yaxuan was invited as celebrity model for the Dior RTW Fall Winter 2021 show in Shanghai, marking his first solo appearances in fashion venues. On November 27, 2021, Teens in Times was invited to Louis Vuitton LVAND 2021 in Shenzhen.

On June 23, 2022, Teens in Times was announced as Louis Vuitton's new global brand ambassador and was invited to promote the LV Spring Summer '23 Men's Collection Show in Paris.

In November 2023, "Designer Pharrell Williams unveiled his pre-fall 2024 men's collection to about 1,200 guests" including "Generation Z favourites - Chinese boy band Teens In Times".

=== Regional Spokesperson ===
On June 23, 2022, SDTV published a video of Song Yaxuan introducing and promoting his hometown Binzhou as a city spokesperson. On the same day, Binzhou News published an interview with Song. The interview was conducted right after Song finished his university entrance exam.

== Awards ==
Year	Award	Category	Work	Status	Ref.
2025	Tencent Video TV And Movie Award	Popular Variety Show Group of the Year	Natural High; Season 2: Lets Go Now	Won	
