= Sé quién eres =

Sé quién eres may refer to:

- Sé quién eres (TV series), a 2017 Spanish television drama series
- I Know Who You Are (2000 film) (Spanish: Sé quién eres), a Spanish-Argentine psychological thriller drama film

== See also ==
- I Know Who You Are (disambiguation)
