= Su Qing =

Su Qing may refer to:

- Su Qing (writer)
- Su Qing (actress)
