= Old Boy (TV series) =

Chinese romance comedy television series

- Genre: Romance; Comedy
- Written by: Gao Rongrong; Li Bofang
- Directed by: Liu Junjie
- Starring: Liu Ye; Ariel Lin; Lei Jiayin; Hu Xianxu
- Country of origin: China
- Original language: Mandarin
- No. of seasons: 1
- No. of episodes: 45

Production
- Production locations: Shanghai; Suzhou; Sydney
- Running time: 45 mins
- Production companies: Haoju Drama (Croton Media); Qianyi Times; iQiyi

Original release
- Network: Hunan TV
- Release: March 4 – April 19, 2018

Old Boy (Chinese: 老男孩) is a 2018 Chinese television series starring Liu Ye and Ariel Lin alongside Lei Jiayin and Hu Xianxu. It aired on Hunan TV from March 4 to April 19, 2018.

== Synopsis ==
An airline pilot Wu Zheng (Liu Ye) and an elite private school English teacher Lin Xiao Ou (Lin Yichen) meet by chance in Australia under unpleasant circumstances. They start off on the wrong foot, but fate makes them cross paths many times.

== Cast ==
- Liu Ye as Wu Zheng
- Ariel Lin as Lin Xiao'ou
- Lei Jiayin as Shi Fei
- Hu Xianxu as Xiao Han
- Guo Shutong as Ye Zi
- Wang Yanzhi as Fei Wenli
- Li Jianyi as Li Liqun
- Ni Hongjie as Ding Fangru
- Wang Ding as Li Lei
- Zhou Qi as Zhou Zhou
- Wang Ce as Zhou Zhengyi
- Wei Wei as Ye Xin
- Zeng Li as Xiao Wei
- Chi Feng as Wang Xiujuan
- Liang Jingxian as Wang Shan
- Yang Xizi as Li Keman
- Tan Kai as Captain Zheng
- Li Guangjie as Xiao Yue
- Lin Peng as Lu Dazhi
- Hua Mingwei as Principal Ou
- Zhou Xianxin as Wu Shuying
- Li Jialin as Aunty Wen
- Hu Kun as Xiao Qi
- Zhang Lan as Mother Ou
- Liu Qi as Wang Yifu

== Soundtrack ==
No.	Title	Lyrics	Music	Singers	Length
1.	"Time (时光)" (Opening theme song)		Hu Botao	Old Boy Singing Group	2:01
2.	"City of Merry Go Round (牧马城市)" (Ending theme song)	Duan Sisi	Tan Xuan	Mao Buyi	4:18
3.	"Old Boy"	Huang Xingrui	Tan Xuan	Leo Ku	4:20
4.	"Boy That Does Not Age (不老男孩)"	Liu Chang	Tan Xuan	Leo Ku	4:20
5.	"The Moment of Giving Up (放下的时候)"	Tan Xuan	Tan Xuan	Liu Ye	3:48
6.	"Losing the Importance (失重)"	Duan Sisi	Tan Xuan	Yisa Yu	4:28
7.	"Before I Go (我走之前)"	Chen Chen	Chen Chen	Chen Chen & Zhan Bo	3:36
8.	"Direction of Light (光的方向)"	Zhan Bo, Li Ning	Zhan Bo	Zhan Bo	4:36

== Production ==
The series is directed by Yu Cuihua (Love O2O, Eternal Love), written by Mobao Feibao (Scarlet Heart, My Sunshine) and produced by Xiong Xiaoling (Love O2O, My Sunshine). Other notable cast members include Teng Huatao (Dwelling Narrowness, Fu Chen) as its executive producer and Di Kun (To Be a Better Man) as its artistic director.

Tangjia Sanshao, the original author of the novel, acts as the promotional ambassador of the series. This is the first cross-over collaboration between entertainment media (television) and literary work.

The series was filmed in Shanghai, Beijing and New York from April to August 2017.

== Awards and nominations ==
Award	Category	Nominated work	Result	Ref.
Influence of Recreational Responsibilities Awards	TV Drama of the Year	Won		
中国电视媒体综合实力大型调研	Outstanding Drama of the Year	Won		
