= The Longest Day in Chang'an =

2019 Chinese historical series

- Promotional poster
- Traditional Chinese: 長安十二時辰
- Simplified Chinese: 长安十二时辰
- Hanyu Pinyin: Cháng'ān Shī'èr Shíchén
- Genre: Historical drama Mystery
- Based on: The Longest Day in Chang'an by Ma Boyong
- Written by: Paw Studio
- Directed by: Cao Dun
- Starring: Lei Jiayin; Jackson Yee
- Country of origin: China
- Original language: Mandarin
- No. of seasons: 1
- No. of episodes: 48

Production
- Executive producer: Liang Chao
- Production locations: Xiangshan Film and Television Town, Xiangyang, Hubei
- Production companies: Youku; Beijing Weying Technology Co., Ltd; Liu Bai Entertainment; Yuyue Film Co., Ltd

Original release
- Network: Youku
- Release: June 27 – August 12, 2019

The Longest Day in Chang'an (Chinese: 长安十二时辰) is a 2019 Chinese historical suspense drama directed by Cao Dun and written by Paw Studio. The series stars Lei Jiayin and Jackson Yee. It is based on the novel of the same name by Ma Boyong. The Longest Day in Chang'an is produced jointly by Youku, Beijing Weying Technology Co., Ltd, Liu Bai Entertainment and Yuyue Film Co., Ltd. The series follows the characters Zhang Xiaojing and Li Bi, and their efforts to foil a terrorist attack on Chang'an, the capital of the Tang dynasty (618–907). It began airing in China on Youku from June 27, 2019.

== Synopsis ==
Zhang Xiaojing is a former soldier in the Longyou Army who served on the frontiers of the Tang dynasty. After retiring, he joined the local security of the city of Chang'an, the heart of the empire, but he was imprisoned and sentenced to death after an incident in which Zhang killed 34 members of a gang that first murdered his former Army commander Wen, and then killed his current commanding officer.

Zhang is unexpectedly reprieved when plans for a major rebellion are uncovered, involving a terrorist cell, the Wolf Squad, which has slipped into Chang'an before the Lantern Festival, one of the most spectacular days in the ancient Chinese calendar. To secure the safety of the Chang'an people, the Jing'an Si (Department of City Security) grants Zhang a special 24-hour amnesty, and he is ordered to catch the terrorists and foil the plot before the day is out. If he succeeds, he will be freed, otherwise, he will be executed. Zhang discovers that he has been drawn into a far greater conspiracy against the empire than anyone had suspected.

== Cast ==
=== Main ===
- Lei Jiayin as Zhang Xiaojing
- Jackson Yee as Li Bi

=== Supporting ===
- Zhou Yiwei as Long Bo
- Peng Guanying as Qin Zheng
- Wu Xiaoliang as Cao Poyan
- Han Tongsheng as He Zhizheng (based on He Zhizhang)
- Cai Lu as Cui Qi
- Lu Fangsheng as Yao Runeng
- Yu Ailei as Yuan Zai
- Djimon Hounsou as Master Ge (voiced by Chen Jianbin)
- Eldos Faruk as Yazedbozid (Monk Yisi)
- Volker Helfrich as Monk Jingde
- Zhao Wei as Xu Bin
- Song Yunhao as Cheng Shen (based on Cen Shen)
- Feng Jiayi as Emperor Xuanzong of Tang
- Reyizha as Tan Qi
- Xu Lu as Yan Yuhuan (based on Yang Yuhuan)
- Wang Herun as Wen Ran
- Ai Ru as Wang Runxiu
- Gao Ye as Li Xiangxiang
- Li Yuan as Yu Chang
- Wang Sisi as Ding Tong'er
- Qu Shanshan as Xu Hezi
- Zhou Lula as Li Yu
- Sukhee Ariunbyamba as Mage'er
- Yin Zhusheng as Lin Jiulang (based on Li Linfu)
- Yang Yi as Wen Wuji
- Ge Zhao'en as Prince Yong
- Robert Gilabert as Pifu

== Soundtrack ==
No.	Title	Lyrics	Music	Singer(s)	Length
1.	"Spring Day at the Royal Palace (清平乐·禁庭春昼 (插曲))" (Theme Song)	Li Bai	Zhao Liangqi	Liu Mei	2:59
2.	"Last Yearnings (长相思 (女歌版片尾曲))" (Liu Mei Version)	Li Bai	Zhao Liangqi	Liu Mei	3:42
3.	"Tanka (短歌行)" (Ending Song)	Li Bai	Zhao Liangqi	Liu Mei	3:52
4.	"Jahannum-dhool (阙勒霍多)" (Ending Song)	Gong Ge	Gong Ge	Gong Ge	3:46
5.	"Last Yearnings (长相思 (男歌版插曲))" (Zhao Liangqi Version)	Li Bai	Xiao Shi	Zhao Liangqi	2:42
6.	"The Grand Chang'An (大長安)"		Zhao Liangqi, Liu Xiaoshan		4:03
7.	"The Disaster of Chang'an (Instrumental with Bamboo Flute) (长安劫 (笛子版))"		Zhao Liangqi, Liu Xiaoshan		2:53
8.	"Time of Si Zheng: Da Huang Luo (巳正·大荒落)"		Zhao Liangqi, Liu Xiaoshan		7:31
9.	"Guarding Chang'An (守护长安)"		Zhao Liangqi, Liu Xiaoshan		2:52
10.	"Fortune Arriving (“大福将至”)"		Zhao Liangqi, Liu Xiaoshan		2:20
11.	"City Underground (地下城)"		Zhao Liangqi, Liu Xiaoshan		3:17
12.	"Tanka (Synchronous Recording) (短歌行 (同期原声版))"		Zhao Liangqi, Liu Xiaoshan		0:39
13.	"Sadness (悲情)"		Zhao Liangqi, Liu Xiaoshan		3:06
14.	"Jahannum-Dhool (阙勒霍多)"		Zhao Liangqi, Liu Xiaoshan		3:44
15.	"Won't Back Down (Instrumental with Cello) (不退！ (大提琴版))"		Zhao Liangqi, Liu Xiaoshan		2:32
16.	"Sneak Up (潜行)"		Zhao Liangqi, Liu Xiaoshan		2:25
17.	"Wolf's Den (狼窝)"		Zhao Liangqi, Liu Xiaoshan		2:40
18.	"Time of You Chu: Zou E (酉初·作噩)"		Zhao Liangqi, Liu Xiaoshan		2:32
19.	"The Prime Minister (右相)"		Zhao Liangqi, Liu Xiaoshan		3:54
20.	"The Other Side of Chang'An (长安的另一面)"		Zhao Liangqi, Liu Xiaoshan		3:51
21.	"Trapping the Wolf (捉狼)"		Zhao Liangqi, Liu Xiaoshan		4:18
22.	"The Black Bones (黑色的骨头)"		Zhao Liangqi, Liu Xiaoshan		2:45
23.	"Dying with No Regret (九死无悔)"		Zhao Liangqi, Liu Xiaoshan		3:05
24.	"The Conspiracy (阴谋)"		Zhao Liangqi, Liu Xiaoshan		4:12
25.	"Master of Hunting (捕猎大师)"		Zhao Liangqi, Liu Xiaoshan		1:57
26.	"Emotion (Instrumental with Bamboo Flute) (情感 (笛子版))"		Zhao Liangqi, Liu Xiaoshan		5:03
27.	"Time of Xu: Wan Wu Mie Jin (戌·万物灭尽)"		Zhao Liangqi, Liu Xiaoshan		4:10
28.	"Uncertainty (变数)"		Zhao Liangqi, Liu Xiaoshan		2:47
29.	"You Shall Proceed (“开始吧”)"		Zhao Liangqi, Liu Xiaoshan		4:54
30.	"Won't Back Down (Instrumental with Duduk) (不退！ (Duduk版))"		Zhao Liangqi, Liu Xiaoshan		2:32
31.	"Emperor's Concern (君忧)"		Zhao Liangqi, Liu Xiaoshan		2:44
32.	"The Pursuit (追击)"		Zhao Liangqi, Liu Xiaoshan		2:34
33.	"The Fear Inside (寒意)"		Zhao Liangqi, Liu Xiaoshan		5:00
34.	"THe Disaster of Chang'an (Instrumental with Pi Pa) (长安劫 (琵琶版))"		Zhao Liangqi, Liu Xiaoshan		2:29
35.	"Sorrow (淡淡的忧伤)"		Zhao Liangqi, Liu Xiaoshan		2:29
36.	"Time of Zi Zheng: Zi Sheng (子正·孳生)"		Zhao Liangqi, Liu Xiaoshan		3:22
37.	"The Magic Scent (降芸神香)"		Zhao Liangqi, Liu Xiaoshan		4:16
38.	"The Crisis (危机)"		Zhao Liangqi, Liu Xiaoshan		3:57
39.	"Emotion (Instrumental with Guan Zi) (情感 (管子版))"		Zhao Liangqi, Liu Xiaoshan		5:03
40.	"Time of Yin Mo: Ye Yin (寅末·夜隐)"		Zhao Liangqi, Liu Xiaoshan		3:19
41.	"Jahannum-dhool (Promo Version) (阙勒霍多 (宣传片版))"		Zhao Liangqi, Liu Xiaoshan		1:30
42.	"Chivalrous Tour (侠客行)" (Interlude)	Li Bai	Zhao Liangqi	Reyizha Alimjan	4:08

== Production ==
Before shooting, Cao Dun and the screenplay writers read the original novel three times.

The crew spent 7 months building the street scenery of Chang'an city.

In order to design the costume of Taoist priest Li Bi, the crew went to consult the Chinese Taoist Association.

Shooting began on November 11, 2017, and ended on June 15, 2018.

== Broadcast ==
The series aired on Chinese online video platform Youku on June 27, 2019. As of July 1, 2019, it got released in other Asian countries, such as Japan, Singapore, Malaysia and Vietnam. It was released in North America through video streaming website including Viki, Amazon and YouTube.

Series 1 began streaming in Australia on SBS On Demand as of 22 January 2020.

== Reception ==
The series has earned high praises. Douban, a major Chinese media rating site, gave the drama 8.6 out of 10.

== Awards and nominations ==
Award	Category	Nominee	Results	Ref.
The Third Internet Film Festival	Best Web Series	The Longest Day in Chang'an	Won	
The Third Internet Film Festival	Best Actor	Lei Jiayin	Won	
The Third Internet Film Festival	Best Producer	Liang Chao	Won	
24th Busan International Film Festival	Asian Contents Awards - Best Actor	Lei Jiayin	Won	
3rd Yinchuan Internet Film Festival	Best Web Series	The Longest Day in Chang'an	Nominated	
3rd Yinchuan Internet Film Festival	Best Director (Web series)	Cao Dun	Won	
3rd Yinchuan Internet Film Festival	Best Actor (Web series)	Lei Jiayin	Won	
26th Huading Awards	Best Director	Cao Dun	Nominated	
26th Huading Awards	Best Actor	Lei Jiayin	Nominated	
26th Huading Awards	Best Actress (Historical drama)	Re Yizha	Nominated	
26th Huading Awards	Best Newcomer	Jackson Yee	Nominated	
26th Huading Awards	Best Producer	Liang Chao	Nominated	
26th Huading Awards	Top Ten Favorite Actors	Lei Jiayin	Won	
26th Huading Awards	Top Ten Favorite Actors	Jackson Yee	Won	
2nd Cultural and Entertainment Industry Congress	Drama of the Year	The Longest Day in Chang'an	Nominated	
2nd Cultural and Entertainment Industry Congress	Best Actor (Drama)	Lei Jiayin	Nominated	
2nd Cultural and Entertainment Industry Congress	Best Supporting Actor (Drama)	Cai Lu	Nominated	
2nd Cultural and Entertainment Industry Congress	Best Supporting Actress (Drama)	Re Yizha	Nominated	
2nd Cultural and Entertainment Industry Congress	Breakthrough Actor (Drama)	Jackson Yee	Nominated	
2nd Cultural and Entertainment Industry Congress	Best On-screen Portrayal	Zhang Xiaojing (Lei Jiayin)	Nominated	
China Entertainment Industry Summit (Golden Pufferfish Awards)	Best Drama	The Longest Day in Chang'an	Won	
China Golden Rooster and Hundred Flowers Film Festival (1st Network Drama Awards)	Quality Web Drama	The Longest Day in Chang'an	Won	
Golden Bud - The Fourth Network Film And Television Festival	Best Web Series	The Longest Day in Chang'an	Nominated	
Golden Bud - The Fourth Network Film And Television Festival	Quality Web Drama of the Year	The Longest Day in Chang'an	Won	
Golden Bud - The Fourth Network Film And Television Festival	Best Actor	Lei Jiayin	Nominated	
Golden Bud - The Fourth Network Film And Television Festival	Best Actress	Xu Lu	Nominated	
Golden Bud - The Fourth Network Film And Television Festival	Rising Actress of the Year	Xu Lu	Won	
Golden Bud - The Fourth Network Film And Television Festival	Best Newcomer	Jackson Yee	Nominated	
8th China Student Television Festival	Most Watched Television Series		Won	
8th China Student Television Festival	Most Watched Actor	Lei Jiayin	Won	
8th China Student Television Festival	Most Watched Actor	Jackson Yee	Won	
Baidu Fudian Awards	Top Ten Television Series	The Longest Day in Chang'an	Won	
Sina Film & TV Award Ceremony	Top Ten Television Series	The Longest Day in Chang'an	Won	
11th Macau International Television Festival	Best Web Series	The Longest Day in Chang'an	Won	
Film and TV Role Model 2019 Ranking	Quality Web Series	The Longest Day in Chang'an	Won	
Weibo Awards Ceremony	Hot Drama of the Year	The Longest Day in Chang'an	Won	
26th Shanghai Television Festival	Best Television Series	The Longest Day in Chang'an	Nominated	
26th Shanghai Television Festival	Best Director	Cao Dun	Nominated	
26th Shanghai Television Festival	Best Adapted Screenplay	Zhuazi Studio	Nominated	
26th Shanghai Television Festival	Best Actor	Lei Jiayin	Nominated	
26th Shanghai Television Festival	Best Cinematography	Jing Chong	Won	
26th Shanghai Television Festival	Best Art Direction	Yang Zhijia, Jin Yang	Won	
30th China TV Golden Eagle Award	Outstanding Television Series	The Longest Day in Chang'an	Won	
30th China TV Golden Eagle Award	Best Director	Cao Dun	Nominated	
30th China TV Golden Eagle Award	Best Actor	Jackson Yee	Nominated	
30th China TV Golden Eagle Award	Audience's Choice For Actor	Jackson Yee	Nominated	
30th China TV Golden Eagle Award	Best Screenwriter	Gua Zi Studio	Nominated	
30th China TV Golden Eagle Award	Best Cinematography	Xing Chong	Won	
30th China TV Golden Eagle Award	Best Original Soundtrack	Duan Ge Xing	Nominated	
