= Scare Out =

2026 Chinese thriller film

- Theatrical release poster
- Chinese: 惊蛰无声
- Hanyu Pinyin: Jīngzhé wúshēng
- Directed by: Zhang Yimou
- Written by: Liang Chen
- Produced by: Pang Liwei; Li Jie
- Starring: Jackson Yee; Zhu Yilong; Song Jia; Lei Jiayin; Yang Mi; Zhang Yi; Liu Shishi; Liu Yaowen
- Cinematography: Zhao Xiaoding
- Edited by: Li Yongyi
- Music by: Peng Fei
- Production companies: Shanghai Zhongzhong Film Co. Beijing Lifeng Culture Development; China Film Group Corporation; Wanda Media
- Distributed by: Damai Entertainment; CMC Pictures
- Release date: February 17, 2026
- Running time: 104 minutes
- Country: China
- Language: Mandarin
- Box office: US$201.4 million

Scare Out (Chinese: 惊蛰无声) is a 2026 Chinese spy thriller film directed by Zhang Yimou and written by Liang Chen. The film stars Jackson Yee, Zhu Yilong, and Song Jia, with Lei Jiayin, Yang Mi, Zhang Yi, Liu Shishi, and Liu Yaowen in supporting roles.

The film was created under the guidance of the Ministry of State Security (MSS), making it the first Chinese film to receive public backing from the MSS. It was released in China on February 17, 2026.

== Plot ==
National Security operatives Huang Kai and Yan Di leads an operation to intercept Nathan, a foreign intelligence operative transporting a metal box containing highly classified material related to China's sixth-generation fighter program. Before Nathan can deliver the box, it suddenly ignites, leaving him severely injured and destroying much of the evidence. During the pursuit, Huang Kai is wounded by a hidden sniper, while another officer is killed. The following day, veteran officer Zhao Hong assumes command of the team. Director Wang privately informs Zhao Hong, Huang Kai and Yan Di that intelligence indicates a foreign agency is attempting to recruit a high-ranking mole within their own unit, prompting a covert internal investigation codenamed Scare Out.

Unknown to his colleagues, Huang Kai has become entangled with Bai Fan, a foreign intelligence operative who is blackmailing him with a secretly recorded video of a drunken sexual encounter. Under duress, Huang Kai agrees to assist Bai Fan by removing forensic evidence from the recovered metal box. Bai Fan is also working with Li Nan, a chemistry professor responsible for leaking the classified technology, who becomes increasingly desperate to flee the country before authorities identify him. Meanwhile, Zhao Hong quietly places Huang Kai, Yan Di and other members of the team under surveillance while withholding the full extent of the investigation from most of the bureau.

To identify the suspected mole, State Security secretly replaces the recovered metal box with a decoy. Realizing the switch, Huang Kai understands that he has become one of the investigation's principal suspects. Yan Di independently begins following Huang Kai and eventually searches Bai Fan's apartment, although she has already removed anything capable of incriminating either herself or Huang Kai. Bai Fan later orders Huang Kai to kill Li Nan, but Yan Di intervenes and prevents the murder. As the investigation broadens, Zhao Hong briefly considers whether Yan Di himself may have been compromised after learning of Bai Fan's connection to his late ex-girlfriend.

Laboratory analysis confirms that the stolen material is part of the stealth technology used in China's latest sixth-generation fighter project, making Li Nan the primary source of the leak. Zhao Hong leads a citywide manhunt as Li Nan attempts to escape with Bai Fan's assistance. Before he can be taken into custody, however, Bai Fan kills Li Nan to eliminate a potential witness. Yan Di pursues Bai Fan but is delayed when he is attacked by a foreign assassin, whom he ultimately kills after a violent confrontation.

Yan Di catches up with Huang Kai as the operation closes in on Bai Fan. Huang Kai kills Bai Fan but, overwhelmed by guilt over his involvement with the foreign intelligence network and the consequences of his actions, takes his own life. Afterwards, it is revealed that Yan Di's apparent contacts with the foreign organization were part of a long-running counterintelligence operation. Although believed by the foreign agency to have defected, Yan Di has secretly maintained a one-way line of communication with Director Wang throughout the investigation. With his cover intact and the foreign organization convinced of his loyalty, Yan Di prepares to continue infiltrating the network and counter future activities by the organization.

== Cast ==
- Jackson Yee as Yan Di, a national security officer
- Zhu Yilong as Huang Kai, a compromised officer and Yan Di's senior
- Song Jia as Zhao Hong, team captain
- Lei Jiayin as Li Nan, a chemistry professor who leaked national secrets
- Yang Mi as Bai Fan, a foreign intelligence operative
- Zhang Yi as Director Wang, Yan Di's superior
- Liu Shishi as Xiao Yu, Huang Kai's wife
- Liu Yaowen as Jian Hao, Yan Di and Huang Kai's subordinate

== Production ==
In February 2025, the film was officially filed with the China Film Administration and approved for production. On April 14, the film began shooting in Shenzhen and released a concept poster, officially announcing its main cast.

== Release ==
The film was released in several countries, including China, Singapore, Malaysia, and the United States on February 17, 2026. It was distributed by Trinity CineAsia in the United Kingdom and Ireland on the same day.

== Reception ==
Simon Abrams of RogerEbert.com gave the film two out of four stars and wrote: "The worst thing about Scare Out isn't that it's boring and ultimately trite, but that there's so little of Zhang's usual sensuousness in it."

Leslie Felperin of The Guardian wrote: "Zhang's incredible command of the craft is fully on display, the cinematic equivalent of quadruple axles, salchows and super-fast spins with one leg held behind the head."
