= I Know Who You Are =

I Know Who You Are may refer to:

- Sé quién eres (TV series) (English: I Know Who You Are), a Spanish television drama series
- I Know Who You Are (2000 film), a Spanish-Argentine psychological thriller drama film
- I Know Who You Are (2026 film), a Chinese period drama film
- "I Know Who You Are" (song), a 2016 single by Planetshakers
- "I Know Who You Are", an episode from The Flash season 3
