= Never Gone (TV series) =

2018 Chinese television series

- Promotional poster
- Genre: Romance
- Based on: Never Gone: So You Are Still Here by Xin Yiwu
- Written by: Jin Guodong
- Directed by: Lin Yufen; Yu Cuihua
- Starring: Yang Zishan; Elvis Han; Toby Lee; Su Qing; Lan Yingying; Tan Jianci
- Country of origin: China
- Original language: Mandarin
- No. of episodes: 36

Production
- Executive producer: Karen Tsai
- Production locations: Shanghai, Guangxi, Shaoxing
- Production companies: Shanghai Ruyi Entertainment; Tangren Media; Khorgos Jixiangyingfang Entertainment

Original release
- Network: Youku, Shandong Television
- Release: November 6, 2018

Related
- Never Gone

Never Gone (Chinese: 原来你还在这里; pinyin: Yuán Lái Nǐ Hái Zài Zhè Lǐ) is a 2018 Chinese streaming television series based on the novel of the same name by Xin Yiwu. It stars Yang Zishan, Elvis Han, Toby Lee, Su Qing, Lan Yingying and Tan Jianci. The series premiered on Youku on November 6, 2018. It later went on national broadcast and aired on Shandong Television from February 19, 2019.

== Synopsis ==
Su Yunjin and Cheng Zheng are classmates in high school. Cheng Zheng is attracted to Su Yunjin, but he doesn't know how to express it well and causes Yunjin to misunderstand his true intentions. However over time, Cheng Zheng's concern for Yunjin touches her heart and Yunjin also starts to develop feelings for Cheng Zheng. However, she knows that their personalities and family background are vastly different, so she purposely avoids Cheng Zheng's advancements.

After getting into different colleges, Cheng Zheng refuses to give up and continues to relentlessly pursue Yunjin. They finally get together but the pressures from life after graduation cause a strain in their relationship. Yunjin throws herself into work while Cheng Zheng is frustrated about her lack of time for him. Misunderstandings pile up and causes the couple to separate. However years later, Cheng Zheng reappears in Su Yunjin's life.

== Cast ==
=== Main ===
- Yang Zishan as Su Yunjin
  - Li Landi as young Su Yujin

A quiet and introverted girl who suffers from low self-esteem due to her family background. Despite her lack of self-confidence, she remains resolute and firm on her decisions.

- Elvis Han as Cheng Zheng
  - Hu Xianxu as young Cheng Zheng

A confident and outgoing guy who is intelligent, good in sports and comes from a rich family background. Despite his love for Su Yujin, his brashness and lack of sensitivity plays a part in driving their relationship apart.

- Toby Lee as Shen Ju'an

Su Yunjin's college senior and ex-boyfriend, later Zhang Yue's husband. A capable man who manages to become the top student and president of the student body through his hard work and determination. However, his poor family background continues to haunt him, driving him to make the decision of using Zhang Yue's feelings for him to rise up the ranks in Heng Kai.

- Su Qing as Mo Yuhua
  - Li Gengxi as young Mo Yuhua

Su Yunjin's high school classmate and best friend. An intelligent and introverted student who later becomes a doctor. She has a one-sided love for Zhou Ziyi, and quietly makes sacrifices for him throughout the years.

- Lan Yingying as Zhang Yue

Cheng Zheng's cousin. CEO of Hengkai Company. A confident and free-spirited woman. She falls in love with Shen Ju'an and willingly let him make use of her, despite knowing that he does not love her.

- Tan Jianci as Zhou Ziyi
  - Bian Cheng as young Zhou Ziyi

Cheng Zheng's high school classmate and best friend. A flirtatious playboy who comes from a rich family, but suffers from lack of familial love. Despite knowing that Mo Yuhua loves him, he is unable to reciprocate her feelings.

=== Supporting ===
- Wen Xin as Meng Xue
  - Sabrina Zhuang as young Meng Xue

Cheng Zheng's childhood friend and high school classmate. She has a one-sided love for Cheng Zheng, and continues to pursue him throughout high school and college. She later falls in love with Song Ming.

- Ji Xiaofei as Song Ming
  - Huang Yi as young Song Ming

Meng Xue's high school classmate. He loved Meng Xue since high school, and was finally able to earn her hand in marriage during their adult days.

- Wan Guopeng as Jinzi

A guy who comes from the same village as Su Yunjin. He was arranged to attend a matchmaking session with Su Yunjin, but ends up befriending Mo Yuhua and has a crush on her.

- Guo Hong as Su Yunjin's mother
- Hou Changrong as Su Yunjin's father
- Lv Liang as Ding Quan, Su Yunjin's stepfather
- Rong Rong as Zhang Jingyin, Cheng Zheng's mother
- Wang Kanwei as Cheng Zheng's father
- Lin Dongfu as Zhang Jingmeng, Cheng Zheng's uncle and President of Ning Kai
- Yuan Ran as An Ran, Su Yunjin's university dorm-mate
- Wang Yi'nuo as Liu Yu, Su Yunjin's university dorm-mate
- Feng Xinrui as Li Hui, Su Yunjin's university dorm-mate
- Xu Linchan as Chen Xiaoyu, Cheng Zheng's university classmate who has a crush on him
- Ding Liuyan as Meng Jia, Mo Yuhua's university classmate whom Zhou Ziyi had a crush on
- Chen Jie as Chen Jiejie, Zhou Ziyi's wife
- Wang Xuan as Lulu, an intern who works for Su Yunjin
- He Qing as Sister Guo, Su Yunjin's workplace superior
- Hai Tong as Brother Lee, Su Yunjun's workplace senior
- Long Zhengxuan as Elsa, Xu Zhiheng's secretary
- Zhao Mengjie as Xiaobei, Zhang Yue's assistant
- Wang Shuo as Zhou Ziyi's father
- Du Zhiqian as Shen Ju'an's mother

=== Special appearance ===
- Archie Kao as Xu Zhiheng

Su Yunjin's boss. He has a strained relationship with his wife, and becomes interested in Su Yunjin and pursues her.

- Ma Yushu as Hu Yue

Xu Zhiheng's wife.

== Production ==
The production team took six months to search for child actors to play the younger counterparts of the main characters. Li Landi, Hu Xianxu, Bian Cheng, Li Gengxi and Zhuang Dafei were selected among 1,000 applicants to play young Su Yunjin, Cheng Zheng, Zhou Ziyi, Mo Yuhua and Meng Xue.

The series began filming at Shanghai in September 2017, and wrapped up filming in December 2017.

== Ratings ==
- Highest ratings are marked in red, lowest ratings are marked in blue

Shangdong TV CSM55 ratings
| Air date | Episode # | Ratings (%) | Audience share (%) | Rank |
|---|---|---|---|---|
| 2019-02-19 | 1-2 | 0.327 | 1.1 | 8 |
| 2019-02-20 | 3-4 | 0.376 | 1.31 | 8 |
| 2019-02-21 | 5-6 | 0.456 | 1.55 | 6 |
| 2019-02-22 | 7-8 | 0.424 | 1.47 | 8 |
| 2019-02-23 | 9-10 | 0.424 | 1.41 | 6 |
| 2019-02-24 | 11-12 | 0.466 | 1.59 | 5 |
| 2019-02-25 | 13-14 | 0.458 | 1.61 | 5 |
| 2019-02-26 | 15-16 | 0.448 | 1.57 | 6 |
| 2019-02-27 | 17-18 | 0.477 | 1.68 | 6 |
| 2019-02-28 | 19-20 | 0.473 | 1.69 | 6 |
| 2019-03-01 | 21-22 | 0.519 | 1.79 | 5 |
| 2019-03-02 | 23-24 | 0.467 | 1.63 | 5 |
| 2019-03-03 | 25-26 | 0.499 | 1.76 | 5 |
| 2019-03-04 | 27-28 | 0.434 | 1.56 | 6 |
| 2019-03-05 | 29-30 | 0.451 | 1.61 | 6 |
| 2019-03-06 | 31-32 | 0.507 | 1.82 | 6 |
| 2019-03-07 | 33-34 | 0.504 | 1.8 | 6 |
| 2019-03-08 | 35-36 | 0.43 | 1.55 | 6 |
| 2019-03-09 | 37-38 | 0.449 | 1.51 | 5 |

== Reception ==
The drama received positive reviews during its airing. Despite its "cliche" storyline and differences in plot with the novel, the drama was praised for its heartwarming story, as well as the acting skills and character interpretation of the lead actors.

== Awards and nominations ==
| Award | Category | Nominated work | Result | Ref. |
|---|---|---|---|---|
| 3rd Tencent Video Star Awards | Top 10 Web Drama | Never Gone | Won | |
| Golden Bud - The Third Network Film And Television Festival | Top 10 Web Drama | Never Gone | Won | |

== Soundtrack ==
| No. | Title | Lyrics | Music | Singers | Length |
|---|---|---|---|---|---|
| 1. | "So You Are Still Here (原来你也在这里)" (Opening theme song) | Yiu Him | Miyuki Nakajima | Zhou Bichang |
| 2. | "Time Flows Back (时光倒流)" | Lin Qiao, Liu Enxun | Lin Delong | Elvis Han |
| 3. | "Courage (勇气)" (Ending theme song) | Rui Ye | Guang Liang | Hu Xia |

== Spin-off ==
A 15-episode spin-off of the drama aired on Youku starting November 10, which centers around the lead character's school life. The drama stars the younger versions of the characters, played by Li Landi, Hu Xianxu, Bian Cheng, Li Gengxi and Zhuang Dafei.
