= Brotherhood of Blades II: The Infernal Battlefield =

2017 Chinese film by Lu Yang

- Poster
- 绣春刀II修罗战场
- Directed by: Lu Yang
- Screenplay by: Lu Yang; Chen Shu
- Produced by: Ning Hao; Wang Yibing
- Starring: Chang Chen; Yang Mi; Zhang Yi
- Cinematography: Hang Qiming
- Edited by: Tu Yiran; Zhu Liyun
- Music by: Kawai Kenji
- Production companies: J.Q. Pictures; Hua Man Shan (Shanghai) Film; Free Whale Pictures; Dirty Monkey Films
- Release date: 19 July 2017 (China)
- Running time: 120 minutes
- Country: China
- Language: Mandarin
- Box office: CN¥263 million

Brotherhood of Blades II: The Infernal Battlefield (绣春刀II修罗战场) is a 2017 Chinese wuxia film directed by Lu Yang. It is a prequel to the 2014 film Brotherhood of Blades. Set in 17th-century China during the Ming dynasty, the story follows Shen Lian, captain of the jinyiwei (secret police), as he searches for the truth behind a conspiracy that framed him, his colleague Pei Lun and a young woman named Beizhai. Starring Chang Chen, Yang Mi and Zhang Yi, the film was released in China on 19 July 2017.

== Synopsis ==
Shen Lian, a jinyiwei officer, killed his colleague Ling Yunkai in order to save the painter Beizhai during a mission to eliminate the rebels. After that, he had to get rid of the suspicion and investigation from Lu Wenzhao and Pei Lun on the one hand, and set fire to the jinyiwei's case library under the threat of a mysterious woman on the other hand. In the turbulent times, Shen Lian and Beizhai fell in love, but they fell deeper and deeper. Behind all this, a huge conspiracy was secretly laid out

== Cast ==
- Chang Chen as Shen Lian
- Yang Mi as Beizhai
- Zhang Yi as Lu Wenzhao
- Liu Duanduan as the Chongzhen Emperor
- Lei Jiayin as Pei Lun
- Xin Zhilei as Ding Baiying
- Chin Shih-chieh as Wei Zhongxian
- Li Yuan as Ding Chong

== Director ==
Lu Yang graduated from the Beijing Film Academy and has a master's degree in directing. His first feature My Spectacular Theatre (2010) won the Audience Award at Busan International Film Festival 2010. Brotherhood of Blades (2014) is his second feature.

== Reception ==
The film has grossed CN¥131 million in China.

== Awards and nominations ==
Awards	Category	Recipient	Result	Ref.
54th Golden Horse Awards	Best Supporting Actor	Lei Jiayin	Nominated	
54th Golden Horse Awards	Best Makeup & Costume Design	Liang Tingting	Nominated	
54th Golden Horse Awards	Best Action Choreography	Sang Lin	Won	
54th Golden Horse Awards	Best Original Film Score	Kawai Kenji	Nominated	
12th Asian Film Awards	Best Action Film	Brotherhood of Blades II: The Internal Battlefield	Nominated	
12th Asian Film Awards	Best Sound		Nominated	
23rd Huading Awards	Best Supporting Actor	Lei Jiayin	Nominated	
25th Beijing College Student Film Festival	Best Actor	Chang Chen	Won	
25th Beijing College Student Film Festival	Best Screenwriter	Lu Yang, Chen Shu, Yu Yang	Nominated	
25th Beijing College Student Film Festival	Best Visual Effects		Nominated	
25th Beijing College Student Film Festival	Students' Choice Award for Favorite Actress	Yang Mi	Won	
