= Battle Through the Heavens =

2018 Chinese television series

- Promotional poster
- Also known as: Fights Break Sphere; Fight Through The Sky
- Genre: Fantasy; Wuxia; Adventure; Romance
- Based on: Doupo Cangqiong by Tiancan Tudou
- Written by: Zhang Ting
- Directed by: Yu Rongguang
- Starring: Leo Wu; Lin Yun; Li Qin; Baron Chen; Xin Zhilei
- Opening theme: Jackdaw Teenagers by Hua Chenyu
- Ending theme: Battle Through the Heavens by Xiao Zhan, Gu Jiacheng, Wu Jiacheng & Peng Chuyue
- Country of origin: China
- Original language: Mandarin
- No. of seasons: 5
- No. of episodes: 184

Production
- Production locations: Hengdian World Studios; Xiangshan World Studio; Yunnan; Duyun
- Production companies: Wanda Media; New Classics Media

Original release
- Network: Hunan TV
- Release: September 3 – October 25, 2018

Battle Through the Heavens
- Traditional Chinese: 鬥破蒼穹
- Simplified Chinese: 斗破苍穹
Transcriptions
Standard Mandarin
- Hanyu Pinyin: Dòupò Cāngqióng

Battle Through the Heavens (Chinese: 斗破苍穹; pinyin: Dòupò Cāngqióng; lit. 'Fight Through The Sky') is a 2018 Chinese television series adapted from the eponymous web novel Doupo Cangqiong (斗破苍穹) by Tiancan Tudou (天蚕土豆). It stars Leo Wu, Lin Yun, Li Qin, Baron Chen, Xin Zhilei and Liu Meitong. The series aired on Hunan TV on September 3, 2018 till October 25, 2018.

== Synopsis ==
Xiao Yan (Leo Wu) is the son of Xiao Zhan (Yu Rongguang) and Gu Wenxin (Carman Lee). When Xiao Yan was nine, his mother was killed by enemies and his father never talked about it. Until he was fifteen years old, his martial art had made no progress due to his mother's ring absorbing all his progress. One day, Xiao Yan encounters the old man Yao Chen (Baron Chen) after making contact with the ring. With the help of Yao Chen, Xiao Yan makes great advances in martial arts, and learns of the main instigator the death of his mother. Xiao Yan enrolls for the Jianan Academy (迦南学院) and makes friends there. Once he is framed and narrowly escaped, he finds that his family have been doomed. In order to revenge for the murder of his mother, but also for the justice of Jianghu, Xiao Yan resolutely chose a single person to challenge the forces of evil.

== Cast ==
=== Main ===
- Leo Wu (Shi Xiaosong (young) ) as Xiao Yan (萧炎)
  - A martial arts genius. Younger son of the Xiao family, Disciple of the Medicine Lord. Lost his abilities at the age of nine after his mother's death but soon makes great advances after his encounter with his teacher, Yao Chen.
- Lin Yun as Xiao Xun'er (萧薰儿)
  - Descendant of the Gu tribe.She was adopted by Xiao Yan's family since young and is loyal toward him. She has had a crush on Xiao Yan since their childhood due to Xiao Yan sneaking into her room to use his Dou Qi to strengthen her bones. Becomes the Dragon Mother of the Gu Clan.
- Li Qin as Xiao Yixian (小医仙)
  - Daughter of the Ice King. Xiao Yan's bosom friend. She has a body filled with different kind of poison.
- Baron Chen as Yao Chen (药尘)
  - The Medicine Lord, previous master of Xing Yun pavilion. Xiao Yan's teacher. Also Xiao Yan's Mother's former teacher.
- Xin Zhilei as Medusa (美杜莎)
  - Queen of the Snake tribe.
- Liu Meitong as Nalan Yanran (纳兰嫣然)
  - Descendant of Nalan tribe. Young mistress of Yunlan sect. Xiao Yan's former fiancee, who canceled their engagement after he lost his abilities. However, she accepted a three year agreement from Xiao Yan to fight for their respective clan's prides.

=== Supporting ===
==== Jianan Academy ====
- Su Qianwei as Ruo Lin (若琳)
  - Grandmaster of Taidou. Xiao Yan and Xiao Xuner's teacher. Known for her beauty and good morals.
- Ling Xiaosu as Han Feng (韩枫)
  - Master of Xing Yun pavilion. Elder of Jianan Academy. Yao Chen's disciple. Traitor working alongside the Soul Hall and causing Xiao Yan's Mother's death.
- Xiao Zhan as Lin Xiuya (林修崖)
  - Leader of the "Wolf Teeth" forces. He is skilled in hunting magical beasts.
- Wu Jiacheng as Hao Tian (昊天)
  - Known as "Bloody Sword". A talent at refining medicine.
- Peng Chuyue as Han Xian (韩闲)
  - Leader of the Medicine sect and then member of the Yan Sect.
- Gu Jiacheng as Hu Jia (虎伽)
  - The character in the novel was the grand-daughter of the vice-principal of Jianan Academy, known as "Demon Girl". Changed to a male in the television adaptation.
- Hua Cheng as Bai Cheng (白程)
  - Arrogant Senior Disciple who despises Xiao Yan.

==== Xiao Tribe ====
- Yu Rongguang as Xiao Zhan (萧战)
  - Leader of Xiao tribe. Xiao Yan's father.
- Li Shen as Xiao Ding (萧鼎)
  - Xiao Yan's elder brother. Leader of Mo Tie army, a group of outlaws who fight for good.
- Yan Xi as Xiao Li (萧厉)
  - Xiao Yan's second brother and Vice-Leader of Mo Tie Army.

==== Gu Tribe ====
- Carman Lee as Gu Wenxin (古文心)
  - Xiao Yan's mother; Yao Chen's disciple. Forced to commit suicide after being falsely labelled as a Traitor
- Li Zifeng as Gu Yuan (古元)
  - Gu Wenxin's brother; Xiao Xuner's father.
- Miao Yilun as Gu Tianyi (古天仪)
  - Xiao Xuner's brother.

==== Nalan tribe (Yunlan Sect) ====
- Norman Chui as Nalan Jie (纳兰桀)
  - Elder of Nalan tribe. Nalan Yanran's grandfather.
- Su Qing as Yun Yun (云韵)
  - Eldest disciple of Yunlan Sect. Nalan Yanran's teacher.
- Zeng Jiang as Yun Shan (云山)
  - Former leader of Yun Lan sect. Yun Yun's teacher.
- Cheng Haofeng as Gu He (古河)
  - Number one medicine practitioner of the world. Elder of Yun Lan sect. Yun Yun's admirer.

==== Mite'er tribe ====
- Qiu Xinzhi as Hai Bodong (海波东)
  - One of the top ten experts of Jia Ma Empire. Grand elder of Mite'er tribe. Known as the "Ice King". Xiao Yixian's father.
- Zhu Xiaoyu as Mi Tengshan (米腾山)
  - Leader of Mite'er tribe and Elder of Jianan Academy.

==== Snake tribe ====
- Du Chun as Mobasi (墨巴斯)
  - Leader of Snake Tribe.
- Xu Kelong as Qing Lin (青麟)
  - Female general of Snake tribe.

==== Others ====
- Guo Xiaofeng as Fa Ma (法犸)
  - Imperial advisor of Chuyun kingdom.
- Chen Zexi as Ye Lan (夜岚)
  - Crown prince of Chuyun kingdom.
- Guo Ziyu as Fan Ling (范凌)
  - Leader of Blood Sect.
- Miao Haojun as Ge Ye (葛叶)
  - Gong Rui as Yun Zhen (云震)
- Dou Bolin as Mo Li (墨黎)
- Wang Wanjuan

== Production ==
=== Casting ===
On January 16, 2017, it was announced that Leo Wu will play the leading role of Xiao Yan. The role of Xiao Xun'er, the female lead, was announced to be portrayed by Lin Yun.

=== Filming ===
Principal photography started on January 16, 2017 and took place in various locations including Hengdian World Studios, Xiangshan World Studio, Yunnan, Duyun. The series ended filming in July 2017.

== Seasons and Episodes ==
Episode Guide
Season #	Episode ##	Total episodes	Air Date
S1	Ep 01	Total 01	Sat Jan 07, 2017
S1	Ep 02	Total 02	Sat Jan 07, 2017
S1	Ep 03	Total 03	Sat Jan 14, 2017
S1	Ep 04	Total 04	Sat Jan 21, 2017
S1	Ep 05	Total 05	Sat Feb 04, 2017
S1	Ep 06	Total 06	Sat Feb 11, 2017
S1	Ep 07	Total 07	Sat Feb 18, 2017
S1	Ep 08	Total 08	Sat Feb 25, 2017
S1	Ep 09	Total 09	Sat Mar 04, 2017
S1	Ep 10	Total 10	Sat Mar 11, 2017
S1	Ep 11	Total 11	Sat Mar 18, 2017
S1	Ep 12	Total 12	Sat Mar 25, 2017
S2	Ep 01	Total 13	Sat Mar 04, 2018
S2	Ep 02	Total 14	Sat Mar 11, 2018
S2	Ep 03	Total 15	Sat Mar 18, 2018
S2	Ep 04	Total 16	Sat Mar 25, 2018
S2	Ep 05	Total 17	Sat Apr 01, 2018
S2	Ep 06	Total 18	Sat Apr 08, 2018
S2	Ep 07	Total 19	Sat Apr 15, 2018
S2	Ep 08	Total 20	Sat Apr 22, 2018
S2	Ep 09	Total 21	Sat Apr 29, 2018
S2	Ep 10	Total 22	Sat May 6, 2018
S2	Ep 11	Total 23	Sat May 13, 2018
S2	Ep 12	Total 24	Sat May 20, 2018
S3	Ep 01	Total 25	Sat Jul 21, 2019
S3	Ep 02	Total 26	Sat Jul 21, 2019
S3	Ep 03	Total 27	Sat Jul 28, 2019
S3	Ep 04	Total 28	Sat Aug 04, 2019
S3	Ep 05	Total 29	Sat Aug 11, 2019
S3	Ep 06	Total 30	Sat Aug 18, 2019
S3	Ep 07	Total 31	Sat Aug 25, 2019
S3	Ep 08	Total 32	Sat Sep 01, 2019
S3	Ep 09	Total 33	Sat Sep 08, 2019
S3	Ep 10	Total 34	Sat Sep 15, 2019
S3	Ep 11	Total 35	Sat Sep 22, 2019
S3	Ep 12	Total 36	Sat Sep 29, 2019
S4	Ep 01	Total 37	Sat Mar 28, 2021
S4	Ep 02	Total 38	Sat Mar 28, 2021
S4	Ep 03	Total 39	Sat Apr 04, 2021
S4	Ep 04	Total 40	Sat Apr 11, 2021
S4	Ep 05	Total 41	Sat Apr 18, 2021
S4	Ep 06	Total 42	Sat Apr 25, 2021
S4	Ep 07	Total 43	Sat May 2, 2021
S4	Ep 08	Total 44	Sat May 9, 2021
S4	Ep 09	Total 45	Sat May 16, 2021
S4	Ep 10	Total 46	Sat May 23, 2021
S4	Ep 11	Total 47	Sat May 30, 2021
S4	Ep 12	Total 48	Sat Jun 06, 2021
S4	Ep 13	Total 49	Sat Jun 13, 2021
S4	Ep 14	Total 50	Sat Jun 20, 2021
S4	Ep 15	Total 51	Sat Jun 27, 2021
S4	Ep 16	Total 52	Sat Jul 04, 2021
S4	Ep 17	Total 53	Sat Jul 11, 2021
S4	Ep 18	Total 54	Sat Jul 18, 2021
S4	Ep 19	Total 55	Sat Jul 25, 2021
S4	Ep 20	Total 56	Sat Aug 01, 2021
S4	Ep 21	Total 57	Sat Aug 08, 2021
S4	Ep 22	Total 58	Sat Aug 15, 2021
S4	Ep 23	Total 59	Sat Aug 15, 2021
S4	Ep 24	Total 60	Sat Aug 29, 2021
S5	Ep 01	Total 61	Sat Jul 31, 2022
S5	Ep 02	Total 62	Sat Jul 31, 2022
S5	Ep 03	Total 63	Sat Jul 31, 2022

== Soundtrack ==
No.	Title	Lyrics	Music	Singers	Length
1.	"Jackdaw Teenagers (寒鸦少年)" (Opening theme song)	Ding Yanxue	Hua Chenyu	Hua Chenyu
2.	"Battle Through the Heavens (斗破苍穹)" (Ending theme song)	Chen Xi	Chen Xi	X NINE (Xiao Zhan, Gu Jiacheng, Wu Jiacheng, Peng Chuyue)
3.	"Song of Cultivation (修炼歌)"	Chen Xi	Dong Dongdong	Wu Jiacheng
4.	"Mountains, Water and Heart of Youth (山水少年心)"	Kun Yadong	Guo Haowei	Wei Xun
5.	"Granting You (许你)"	Chen Xi	Dong Dongdong	Lin Yun
6.	"Healer's Heart (医心)"	Kun Yadong	Guo Haowei	Su Qing
7.	"Wait for Me (等我)"	Wang Zhu	Wang Zi	Saixixi
8.	"Burning Day (焚天)"	Sheng Hao, Three	Three	Li Zifeng
9.	"Scent of Dreams (梦留香)"	Wang Zhu	Wang Zi	Liu Meitong
10.	"Hero (英雄)"		Dong Dongdong

== Awards and nominations ==
Award	Category	Nominated work	Result	Ref.
12th Tencent Video Star Awards	Top Ten Series	Battle Through the Heavens	Won	

== Ratings ==
In this table, the blue numbers represent the lowest ratings and the red numbers represent the highest ratings.

Episode #	Original broadcast date	Average audience share (CSM52)			Average audience share (National Average)		
Episode #	Original broadcast date	Ratings	Audience share	Ranking	Ratings	Audience share	Ranking
1-2	September 3, 2018	0.674%	5.859%	1	0.42%	4.64%	1
3-4	September 4, 2018	0.661%	5.644%	1	0.43%	4.66%	1
5-6	September 5, 2018	0.673%	5.968%	1	0.36%	4.24%	1
7-8	September 10, 2018	0.937%	8.763%	1	0.41%	4.94%	1
9-10	September 11, 2018	0.789%	7.2%	1	0.37%	4.22%	1
11-12	September 12, 2018	0.671%	6.138%	1	0.33%	3.84%	1
13-14	September 17, 2018	0.567%	5.324%	1	0.36%	4.16%	1
15-16	September 18, 2018	0.517%	4.663%	1	0.33%	3.66%	1
17-18	September 19, 2018	0.606%	5.463%	1	0.35%	4%	1
19-20	September 24, 2018	0.686%	5.363%	1	0.39%	4.03%	1
21-22	September 25, 2018	0.669%	6.062%	1	0.34%	3.95%	1
23-24	September 26, 2018	0.642%	5.899%	1	0.28%	3.34%	2
25-26	September 27, 2018	0.594%	5.462%	1	0.31%	3.64%	2
27-28	October 3, 2018	0.641%	5.555%	1	0.39%	4.12%	1
29-30	October 4, 2018	0.785%	6.433%	1	0.47%	4.97%	1
31-32	October 10, 2018	0.644%	6.206%	1	0.33%	4.11%	1
33-34	October 11, 2018	0.667%	6.22%	1	0.34%	4.21%	1
35-36	October 17, 2018	0.794%	6.982%	1	0.36%	4.17%	1
37-38	October 18, 2018	0.738%	6.618%	1	0.33%	3.9%	1
39-40	October 24, 2018	0.704%	6.094%	1	0.34%	3.71%	1
41-42	October 25, 2018	0.751%	6.92%	1	0.41%	5.08%	1
Average		0.697%	6.13%	1	0.36%	4.17%	1
