= Hu Xianxu =

Chinese actor (born 2000)

- Born: August 17, 2000 (age 26); Tianjin, China
- Education: Central Academy of Drama
- Occupation: Actor
- Years active: 2009–present
- Agent: Enlight Media

Chinese name
- Simplified Chinese: 胡先煦
Transcriptions

Hu Xianxu (Chinese: 胡先煦, born August 17, 2000) is a Chinese actor.

== Career ==
In 2009, Hu made his first appearance in the CCTV program Fei Chang Liu Jia Yi. He next participated in program called Dang Hong Bu Ran, coming in second, and subsequently signed a contract with an acting company.

In 2011, Hu made his acting debut in the film Xiao Jian De He Chang Tuan. In 2012, Hu starred in his first television series Chong Fan Da Fu Cun.

Hu first gained recognition for his performance in the family drama A Love For Separation (2016). He gained further recognition with his role as a young Emperor in the wuxia historical drama Nirvana in Fire 2 (2017).

In 2018, Hu starred in the modern romance drama Old Boy. His performance as a rebellious and wayward teenager earned positive reviews. The same year, he starred in the palace drama Ruyi's Royal Love in the Palace playing a filial prince, and romance drama Never Gone as the younger version of the male protagonist.

In 2019, Hu starred in the drama Hikaru No Go, based on the Japanese manga series.

== Other activities ==
=== Ambassadorship ===
On April 18, 2019, Hu was appointed as the Spokesperson of the 10th International College Students Fashion Design Festival.

On October 21, Hu was appointed as UNFPA China’s Youth Champion.

On November 5, Hu was appointed as the Tourist Ambassador of La Vienne Province, in France.

=== Charity ===
On November 13, 2019, Delsey invited Hu to join their 1 million yuan donation to schools in Guyuan County in Hebei Province through the China Youth Development Foundation. This donation covered 16 schools, and more than 6,000 students.

== Filmography ==
=== Film ===
Year	English title	Chinese title	Role
2011		你是我的牵挂	Lin Bo
2011		小建的合唱团	Xiao Jian
2012	Always Sunny	一直是晴天	Ding Xiaohu
2012		非常十日	Jiang Jun
2013	Saving General Yang	忠烈杨家将	young Yang Erlang
2015	Where Are All The Time	时间都去哪了	young Yaoyuan
2016	Yesterday Once More	谁的青春不迷茫	Lin Ziao
2016	Song of the Phoenix	百鸟朝凤	Lan Yu
2019	A City Called Macau	妈阁是座城	Le Le
2021	1921	1921	Bao Huiceng
2023	The Wandering Earth II	流浪地球2	young diplomat
2023		瞧一桥	Chen Zhiyong
2023	Flaming Cloud	三贵情史	Wang Sangui
2024	Pegasus 2	飞驰人生2	Driver No. 1
2024	I love you to the moon and back	穿过月亮的旅行	Wang Rui
2024	The Traveller	异人之下	Zhang Chulan

=== Television series ===
Year	English title	Chinese title	Role	Ref.
2009	Amor Hero	铠甲勇士	Liang Liang	
2013		重返大福村	Lu Guaihu	
2013	The Evolution of Genius 2	天才进化论二	Qi Yiguo	
2013	King Rogue	胭脂霸王	young Xiao Wukui	
2013	Little Daddy	小爸爸	young Yu Guo	
2014	Baby Child Back Home	宝贝儿回家	Da Qiqi	
2014		憨妻的都市日记	Niu Xiaowan	
2015		快乐酷宝2	Situ Le	
2016	A Love For Separation	小别离	Zhang Xiaoyu	
2017	Song Yao My Father	宋耀如·父亲	young Charlie Soong	
2017	My! Physical Education Teacher	我的！体育老师	Lu Kuan	
2017	K.O.3an Guo	终极三国	young Emperor	
2017		向幸福前进	young Xiaoyong	
2017	Nirvana in Fire 2	琅琊榜之风起长林	Xiao Yuanshi	
2018	Always With You	陪读妈妈	Ding Yiyi	
2018	Old Boy	老男孩	Xiao Han	
2018	Ruyi's Royal Love in the Palace	如懿传	Aisin Gioro Yongcheng	
2018	Never Gone	原来你还在这里	Cheng Zheng (childhood)	
2020	Hikaru No Go	棋魂	Shi Guang	
2022	The Examination for Everyone	大考	Zhou Bowen	

=== Reality show ===
Year	English title	Chinese title	Role	Ref.
2018	Hi Housemate		Cast member	
2024	Natural High; Season:2	现在就出发	Cast Member	
2025	Natural High; Season:3	现在就出发	Cast Member	

== Discography ==
Year	English title	Chinese title	Album
2010	You	你	—N/a

== Awards ==
Year	Award	Category	Nominated work	Status	Ref.
2016	7th Internet Bull Ear Award	Entertainment Figure of the Year	—N/a		
2018	7th iQiyi All-Star Carnival	Most Promising Drama Actor	Old Boy		
2019	China TV Drama Awards	Youth acting new generation	—N/a		
2025	Tencent Video TV And Movie Award	Popular Variety Show Group of the Year	Natural High; Season 2: Lets Go Now	Won	
