= Natural High (TV series) =

2023 Chinese variety show

- Simplified Chinese: 现在就出发
- Genre: Variety show; Reality show; Comedy
- Directed by: Wang Hailong; Wu Jingneng
- Starring: Current Cast: Shen Teng; Bai Jingting; Jia Bing; Wang Anyu; Fan Chengcheng; Hu Xianxu; Huang Jingyu; Wang Churan; Former Cast: Pax Congo; Song Yaxuan; Allen Ai; Jiang Yan; Gina Jin
- Country of origin: China
- Original language: Chinese
- No. of seasons: 4
- No. of episodes: 86

Production
- Producers: Chengdu Film and Television; Yisheng Xiangyang
- Production locations: China; Italy
- Running time: 90 minutes
- Production company: Tencent Video

Original release
- Network: Tencent Video; WeTV
- Release: 13 August 2023 – present

Natural High (Chinese: 现在就出发) is a Chinese outdoor reality show started in 2023. The shows regular members are Shen Teng, Bai Jingting and Jia Bing. The show highlights natural landscapes and culture to promote tourism, as celebrities travel across countries, play games, and experience a simple lifestyle in a 'Zero Frame Group' format that prioritizes spontaneity. Each episode is released in two parts, broadcast over successive days. The show's success led to subsequent seasons.

It exceeded 27000 popularity index points for all seasons, set records in Tencent Video variety show history, and topped the 'Most Popular Chinese Variety Shows' list.

== Plot ==
The show introduced innovative game design, combining new concepts with unique formats. Light, brain-teasing activities encouraged intense participation, created spontaneous and hilarious moments, and tested reflexes, improvisation, and creativity.

Each episode features participants exploring natural landscapes and local tourism spots through games and competitions. Partnering with cultural and tourism bureaus, the show highlights niche attractions, local customs, and food, offering viewers a practical travel guide while promoting local economies and cultural tourism.

== Seasons ==
Season	Episodes	Originally aired	
Season	Episodes	Premiere	Finale
Season 1	20	13 August 2023	16 October 2023
Season 2: Pilot	2	19 October 2024	24 October 2024
Season 2	20	26 October 2024	29 December 2024
Season 3: Pilot	2	18 October 2025	19 October 2025
Season 3	20	25 October 2025	28 December 2025
Season 4: Pilot	2	1 October 2026	2 October 2026
Season 4	20	10 October 2026	TBA

== Members and guests ==
=== Main Members ===
Regular	Season/ Episode
Shen Teng	S1, S2, S3 & S4: All
Bai Jingting	S4: Ep:1- S3: Ep:1-4, 10; S2: Ep:1-3, 8-10; S1: Ep:2-3, 5-10
Jia Bing	S4: Ep:1- S3: All; S2: Ep:1-5, 8-10; S1: All
Wang Anyu	S4: Ep:1-4, 6- S3: All; S2: All; S1: Ep:8
Fan Chengcheng	S4: Ep:1- S3: All; S2: Ep:9-10; S1: All
Hu Xianxu	S4: Ep:1- S3: All; S2: Ep:3-10
Huang Jingyu	S4: Ep:1- S3: All; S2: Ep:4-8
Wang Churan	S4: Ep:1-

=== Former Cast Members ===
Recurring	Season/ Episode
Gina Jin	S3: Ep:1, 3-10; S2: Ep:1-7, 10; S1: All
Jiang Yan	S3: Ep:1-2; S2: Ep:4-8
Song Yaxuan	S4: Ep:5; S2: Ep:1-8
Allen Ai	S3: Ep:1; S2: Ep:1,2; S1: Ep:1,4,7
Pax Congo	S1: Ep:1-7

=== Guests ===
Guests	Season/ Episode
Lin Yi	S4: Ep:4; S2: Ep:8-9
Li Yunrui	S4: Ep:5
Sun Qian	S3: Ep:1-2
William Chan	S3: Ep:5-8
Chen Zheyuan	S3: Ep:9
Guan Xiaotong	S2: Ep:6-8
Cao Feiran	S2: Ep:8-9
Lin Gengxin	S2: Ep:8-10
Angelababy	S1: Ep:8-9
Hankiz Omar	S1: Ep:8-9
Wei Daxun	S1: Ep:2-3
Jia Nailiang	S1: Ep:1,4
Ma Li	S1: Ep:5-6
Zhou Ye	S1: Ep:1
Turbo Liu	S1: Ep:2-3
Zhang Yifan	S1: Ep:3
Meng Ziyi	S1: Ep:10
Yue Yunpeng	S1: Ep:10
Wang Feifei	S1: Ep:4
Sha Yi	S1: Ep:9-10
Jim Yu	S1: Ep:5-6

== Reception ==
- Season 1: It became Tencent’s No. 1 ranked variety show for its refreshing format, featuring guest's genuine performances that blended travel, games and casual conversations, captured a relaxed lifestyle in a dynamic style.
- Season 2: On its premiere, it broke the S-level variety show popularity index with 25,000 points on Tencent; it set a record and topped the charts for five consecutive weeks.
- Season 3: It achieved the fastest 27,000 popularity index; and had received almost 4 million pre-release reservations, thereby setting two records in Tencent variety show history.
- Season 4: It achieved the fastest 28,000 popularity index, and was listed as S+ Tier i.e. 'Top Performing Variety Show' on Yunhe Chart.

== Production ==
The show is jointly produced by Chengdu Film and Television City based Tianfu Kuanzhai Culture Communication Co. Ltd., Tencent Video, and Yisheng Xiangyang.

In Season 3, the show upgraded its format and filmed internationally, capturing scenes shot in Milan and Florence. The familiar cast shot segments in Tibet and Italy. On March 2026, announcement of its latest season was made.

== Awards and nominations ==
Year	Award	Category	Nominee	Result	Ref.
2023	Tencent Golden Penguin Award	VIP Favorite Variety Show of the Year	Season 1: Start Now	Won	
2023	Tencent Golden Penguin Award	Business Value Variety Show of the Year	Season 1: Start Now	Won	
2023	Tencent Golden Penguin Award	Popular Variety Show of the Year	Season 1: Start Now	Won	
2023	Tencent Golden Penguin Award	Variety Show Star of the Year	Season 1: Shen Teng; Fan Chengcheng	Won	
2023	Tencent Entertainment White Paper Annual Ceremony	Variety Show Audience Favorite Artist of the Year	Season 1: Wei Daxun	Won	
2024	Golden Bud Network Film and Television Festival	Members' Favorite Variety Show of the Year	Season 2: Lets Go Now	Won	
2024	Golden Bud Network Film and Television Festival	Most Commercially Valuable Variety Show of the Year	Season 2: Lets Go Now	Won	
2024	Golden Bud Network Film and Television Festival	Popular Variety Show of the Year	Season 2: Lets Go Now	Won	
2024	China Television Annual Ranking Award	Popular Variety Show of the Year	Season 2	Won	
2024	Beijing News Annual Television Ranking Award	Quality Variety Show of the Year	Season 2	Won	
2024	Tencent Golden Penguin Award	VIP Favorite Variety Show of the Year	Season 2	Won	
2024	Tencent Golden Penguin Award	Business Value Variety Show of the Year	Season 2	Won	
2024	Tencent Golden Penguin Award	Popular Variety Show of the Year	Season 2	Won	
2024	Tencent Golden Penguin Award	Popular Group of the Year	Season 2: Bai Jingting; Gina Jin; Song Yaxuan; Wang Anyu; Shen Teng; Hu Xianxu; Ja Bing	Won	
2025	Weibo Awards Ceremony	Variety Show of the Year	Season 2	Won	
2025	Shanghai Television Festival (Magnolia Awards)	Best Variety Show	Season 2	Nominated	
2025	Tencent Golden Penguin Award	Best Variety Show	Season 3	Won	
2025	Tencent Golden Penguin Award	Annual Most Commercially Valuable Variety Show of the Year	Season 3	Won	
2025	Tencent Golden Penguin Award	Member's Favourite Variety Show of the Year	Season 3	Won	
2025	Tencent Golden Penguin Award	Best Variety Show Director	Wang Hailong	Won	
2025	Tencent Golden Penguin Award	Best Editor	Yang Feifan	Won	
2025	Tencent Golden Penguin Award	Newcomer Variety Show Writer	Peng Guanfu	Won	
2026	Huanwang Big Data Awards	Variety Show of the Year	Season 3	Nominated	
2026	Huanwang Big Data Awards	Large Screen On-demand Variety Show	Season 3	Nominated	
2026	Huanwang Big Data Awards	Commercially Valuable Variety Show of the Year	Season 3	Nominated	
2026	7th Cloud+ Awards	Variety Show of the Year	Season 3	Won	
2026	Shanghai TV Festival; Magnolia Awards	Best Variety Program	Season 3	Nominated	
