= Teens in Times =

Chinese boy group

Teens in Times (TNT) 时代少年团
- Origin: Beijing, China
- Genre: C-pop
- Years active: 2019–present
- Label: Time Fengjun Entertainment
- Members: Ma Jiaqi; Ding Chengxin; Song Yaxuan; Liu Yaowen; Zhang Zhenyuan; Yan Haoxiang; He Junlin
- Website: www.tfent.cn/family/typhoon.html

Chinese name
- Traditional Chinese: 時代少年團
- Simplified Chinese: 时代少年团
Transcriptions
Standard Mandarin
- Hanyu Pinyin: Shídài shàonián tuán

Teens in Times (Chinese: 时代少年团; pinyin: Shídài shàonián tuán), abbreviated as TNT, is a Chinese boy group formed by Time Fengjun Entertainment. Members include Ma Jiaqi, Ding Chengxin, Song Yaxuan, Liu Yaowen, Zhang Zhenyuan, Yan Haoxiang, and He Junlin. The group is one of China's most popular boy bands.

== Name ==
The group's Chinese name literally translates to "Teen Group of the Times" or "Era Youth Group." The English name "Teens in Times" is a conceptual adaptation. In addition to the literal meaning, the group's acronym "TNT" also alludes to the explosive compound trinitrotoluen.

== Career ==
=== 2019–2020: Career beginnings ===
The group was created as a continuation of the inactive TFBoys and disbanded Typhoon Teens boy groups. Candidates for the new group were chosen via TF Entertainment's survival show "Typhoon Project" (Chinese: 台风蜕变之战; pinyin: Táifēng tuìbiàn zhī zhàn).

On August 25, 2019, the seven members were announced. The group name was officially released on October 11, 2019. TNT made their official debut on November 23, 2019, with the singles "School Bulletin" (全校通报) and "Endless Adventure" (无尽的冒险) and quickly gained a fanbase.

=== 2021–present: Breakthrough ===
TNT's extended play Juvenile Rivers & Lakes recorded over 630,000 pre-orders within 119 hours, generating ¥100 million CNY. Their first studio album, Dancing With the Elephant, was released on July 18, 2021.

== Image and style ==
TNT's music blends Mandopop with upbeat youth dance-pop, with choreography-driven stage performances aimed at teenage audiences. The group's official fandom, known as "Popcorn" (爆米花), has accumulated over 12 million social media followers across Weibo and Douyin.

== Discography ==
=== Studio albums ===
List of studio albums, showing selected details, sales figures, and certifications
| Title | Album details | Peak chart positions |
| Title | Album details | CHN TME |
|---|---|---|
| Dancing With the Elephant (舞象之年) | Released: July 18, 2021; Label: Time Fengjun Entertainment; Formats: CD, digital download, streaming | 1 |
| Teens in (Utopia) (乌托邦少年) | Released: January 20, 2023; Label: Time Fengjun Entertainment; Formats: CD, digital download, streaming | 1 |
| Beyond Utopia (叁重楼) | Released: February 12, 2025; Label: Time Fengjun Entertainment; Formats: CD, digital download, streaming | 1 |

== Awards ==
| Award ceremony | Year | Category | Ref. |
|---|---|---|---|
| Tencent Music Entertainment Awards | 2019 | New Voice Generation Group | |
| Tencent Music Entertainment Awards | 2021 | Top 10 Songs of the Year ("I Want You to Take Care of It") | |
| Tencent Music Entertainment Awards | 2022 | Top 10 Songs of the Year ("Ne Zha") | |
| Tencent Music Entertainment Awards | 2022 | Group of the Year | |
| Weibo Music Awards | 2022 | Most Influential Music Group | |
| Weibo Music Awards | 2023 | Most Influential Music Group | |
| Weibo Music Awards | 2024 | Influential Group of the Year | |
| Oriental Billboard Music Festival | 2020 | Best New Group Award | |
| QQ Music BOOM BOOM Awards | 2020 | Popular Idol Group of the Year | |
| Tencent Video Starlight Awards | 2020 | Trend Group of the Year | |
| Weibo Night Awards | 2020 | Popular Group of the Year | |
| iQIYI Scream Night | 2019 | Annual Potential Combination of the Year | |
| Baidu Boiling Point Metaverse Night | 2022 | Influential Group of the Year | |
