= Article 20 =

2024 film directed by Zhang Yimou

- Theatrical release poster
- Traditional Chinese: 第二十條
- Simplified Chinese: 第二十条
- Literal meaning: Article 20
- Hanyu Pinyin: Dì èr shí tiáo
- Directed by: Zhang Yimou
- Written by: Li Meng; Wang Tianyi
- Starring: Lei Jiayin; Ma Li; Zhao Liying; Gao Ye; Liu Yaowen
- Cinematography: Zhao Xiaoding
- Edited by: Li Yongyi
- Production companies: Beijing Enlight Pictures; Center for Film & Television of the Supreme People's Procuratorate
- Distributed by: Beijing Enlight Pictures
- Release date: February 10, 2024
- Running time: 141 minutes
- Country: China
- Language: Mandarin
- Box office: $337.6 million

Article 20 (Chinese: 第二十条) is a 2024 Chinese drama film directed by Zhang Yimou, and stars Lei Jiayin, Ma Li, Zhao Liying and Gao Ye. The film tells the story of a prosecutor who has reached middle age and wants to seize the last opportunity to work at the Municipal Procuratorate. The film juxtaposes his career and family life with the similar struggle in both. Article 20 was released in theaters in China on February 10, 2024, in IMAX, CINITY, Dolby Vision and other formats.

The title originates from Article 20 of the Criminal Law of the People's Republic of China, the statute of "legitimate defense (Chinese: 正当防卫)".

== Plot ==
Since taking a temporary position at the city prosecutor's office, Han Ming has been plagued with one headache after another. Both in and out of work, Han Ming frequently talks to and travels with his colleague, Lu Lingling (a former college girlfriend of his), causing cases to drag on unresolved. His wife, Li Maojuan, even perceives this as him cheating.

Zhang Guisheng, a former bus driver and an acquaintance of Han Ming, was fired from his job several years ago for fighting back against hooligans who harassed a woman on the bus and got into a fight. He is going to take a train to Beijing to appeal the case (at his teenage daughter's insistence) but on the way to the train station is hit by a high-speed truck and dies.

Han Ming is also investigating a rape case filed by a deaf woman, Hao Xiuping. Her husband fatally stabbed the rapist and was incarcerated. The rapist's accomplices have been harassing the woman and attempting to force her to sign a document dropping the charges. Desperate and scared for the safety of her husband and child, she jumps off the top floor of a construction site.

Han Ming's son, Yuchen, witnesses the son of his school's principal beating up a classmate and intervenes. He fights the son and breaks his nose, causing the principal to sue Han Ming and Li Maojuan. Yuchen refuses to apologize and does not explain the full situation. This causes a group of the principal's son's friends to beat him up one day. Li Maojuan, outraged by this, takes matters into her own hands and assaults the principal, escalating the conflict even further and leading to her own administrative detention.

As the battle between emotion and law unfolds, and the struggle to balance career and family intensifies, Han Ming decides to risk everything, determined to uphold fairness and justice in his own way.

In court, Han Ming calls for charges against the defendants in all of these cases be dropped. He invokes Article 20 of Chinese criminal law, suggesting that all of these were valid self-defense cases. His speech receives applause from the audience, and all are freed.

== Cast ==
- Lei Jiayin as Han Ming
- Ma Li as Li Maojuan
- Zhao Liying as Hao Xiuping
- Gao Ye as Lu Lingling
- Liu Yaowen as Han Yuchen
- Wang Xiao as Deputy Prosecutor Tian
- Chen Minghao as Li Maoquan
- Pan Binlong as Wang Yongqiang
- Zhang Yi as Zhang
- Fan Wei as Liu Bingren
- Yu Hewei as Prosecutor Wang

== Production ==
=== Filming ===
Principal photography began on July 1, 2023 in Langfang, Hebei.

== Release ==
On January 12, 2024, the film was officially announced to be released on February 10, 2024 (the first day of the Lunar New Year), along with a scheduled poster (that revealed the cast of main actors for the first time) and a preview.

== Reception ==
The final box office of the film is 2.454 billion yuan, breaking 9 film history records and ranking 28th on the current box office list of Chinese film history. The film was the 23rd highest grossing film of 2024.

== Awards and nominations ==
| Year | Award | Category | Nominee / Work | Result | Ref. |
|---|---|---|---|---|---|
| 2024 | 37th Hundred Flowers Awards | Best Picture | Article 20 | Nominated | |
| 2024 | 37th Hundred Flowers Awards | Best Director | Zhang Yimou | Won | |
| 2024 | 37th Hundred Flowers Awards | Best Writing | Li Meng, Zhang Yimou | Nominated | |
| 2024 | 37th Hundred Flowers Awards | Best Actress | Ma Li | Won | |
| 2024 | 37th Hundred Flowers Awards | Best Supporting Actress | Zhao Liying | Won | |
| 2024 | 37th Hundred Flowers Awards | Best Newcomer | Liu Yaowen | Nominated | |
| 2024 | 19th Changchun Film Festival - Golden Deer Award | Best Director | Zhang Yimou | Won | |
| 2024 | 37th Golden Rooster Awards | Best Picture | Article 20 | Won | |
| 2024 | 37th Golden Rooster Awards | Best Director | Han Yan | Nominated | |
| 2024 | 37th Golden Rooster Awards | Best Actor | Lei Jiayin | Won | |
| 2024 | 37th Golden Rooster Awards | Best Actress | Ma Li | Nominated | |
| 2024 | 37th Golden Rooster Awards | Best Supporting Actress | Zhao Liying | Nominated | |
| 2024 | 37th Golden Rooster Awards | Best Writing | Li Meng, Zhang Yimou | Nominated | |
| 2024 | 37th Golden Rooster Awards | Best Art Direction | Lin Mu | Nominated | |
| 2024 | 37th Golden Rooster Awards | Best Music | Zhao Lin | Nominated | |
| 2025 | 43rd Hong Kong Film Awards | Best Asian Chinese Language Film | Article 20 | Nominated | |
