= A Writer's Odyssey =

- Theatrical release poster
- Traditional Chinese: 刺殺小說家
- Simplified Chinese: 刺杀小说家
- Literal meaning: Assassinate the Novelist
- Hanyu Pinyin: cìshā xiǎoshuōjiā
- Directed by: Lu Yang
- Written by: Lu Yang; Chen Shu; Haiyan Qin; Yu Yang
- Based on: A Writer's Odyssey by Shuang Xuetao
- Produced by: Ning Hao
- Starring: Lei Jiayin; Yang Mi; Dong Zijian; Yu Hewei; Guo Jingfei
- Cinematography: Qiming Han
- Edited by: Lin Zhu; Liyun Zhu
- Music by: Jed Kurzel
- Production company: CMC Productions
- Distributed by: CMC Pictures
- Release date: February 12, 2021 (China)
- Country: China
- Language: Mandarin
- Box office: US$159.9 million

A Writer's Odyssey (Chinese: 刺杀小说家) is a 2021 Chinese action-adventure fantasy film directed and written by Lu Yang and produced by Ning Hao, starring Lei Jiayin, Yang Mi, Dong Zijian, Yu Hewei, and Guo Jingfei. The film was released February 12, 2021, on Chinese New Year. The film is based on Shuang Xuetao's novel of the same name, and its sequel Godslayer.

== Plot ==
The film follows Guan Ning as he searches for his daughter, believing her to be kidnapped by human traffickers. Soon, a powerful corporation contacts him and offers to find his daughter if he assassinates Lu Kongwen, a young novelist. The plot of his novel involves a young hero attempting to overthrow Redmane, their tyrannical ruler. Somehow, the novel appears to be impacting life in the real world, and the CEO, who suspects it as his bane, wants Lu dead.

== Cast ==
- Lei Jiayin as Guan Ning
- Yang Mi as Tu Ling
- Dong Zijian as Kongwen Lu, the novelist
- Yu Hewei as Li Mu
- Guo Jingfei as Black Armor
- Tong Liya as Pan Ruo
- Dong Jie as Guan Ning's wife

== Production ==
Post-production lasted over two years.

== Reception ==
On Rotten Tomatoes, the film holds an approval rating of 93% based on 14 reviews, with an average rating of 6.8/10.

Harris Dang of The AU Review gave the film 3.5/5 stars and wrote: "Overall, A Writer's Odyssey is an entertaining thrill ride that provides enough wild action, energy, creativity, and visual splendor to satisfy audiences." Richard Kuipers of Variety said "Odyssey is packed with stunning sights including a 50-ft., four-armed CGI villain but is let down by a script that fails to fashion promising story elements into a consistently compelling whole."

Narayan Liu of CBR.com gave the film a positive review, praising its visuals, while noting the weak characterization. Lim Yian Lu of Yahoo! Singapore gave the film a positive review, describing it as a "a great action film to watch."

Tay Yek Keak of Today Online gave the film a more negative review, describing it as "basically a viewer's ordeal."

== Accolades ==
Date	Award	Category	Recipient(s) and nominee(s)	Result	Notes
2021	34th Golden Rooster Awards	Best Director	Lu Yang	Nominated	
2021	34th Golden Rooster Awards	Best Cinematography	Han Qiming	Nominated	
2021	34th Golden Rooster Awards	Best Sound Recording	Wang Gang, Liu Xiaosha and Xiong Yi	Nominated	
2021	34th Golden Rooster Awards	Best Art Direction	Li Miao	Nominated	
2021	34th Golden Rooster Awards	Best Music	Yu Fei	Nominated	
2021	34th Golden Rooster Awards	Best Editing	Zhu Libin and Zhu Lin	Nominated	
2021	15th Asian Film Awards	Best Production Design	Li Miao	Nominated	
2021	15th Asian Film Awards	Best Visual Effects	Eric Xu, Allen Wei	Nominated	
