= I Know Who You Are (2026 film) =

2026 Chinese film by Feng Xiaogang

- Theatrical release poster
- Traditional Chinese: 抓特務
- Simplified Chinese: 抓特务
- Literal meaning: Catch the spy
- Hanyu Pinyin: Zhūa Tè Wù
- Directed by: Feng Xiaogang
- Written by: Shi Jianquan
- Starring: Lei Jiayin; Hu Ge
- Music by: Han Hong
- Production company: Damai Entertainment Holdings
- Release date: June 19, 2026
- Running time: 142 minutes
- Country: China
- Language: Mandarin
- Box office: US$17.6 million

I Know Who You Are (simplified Chinese: 抓特务; traditional Chinese: 抓特務; pinyin: Zhūa Tè Wù) is a 2026 Chinese period drama film directed by Feng Xiaogang and based on Zhang Ce's 1992 novella No Regrets Tracking (simplified Chinese: 无悔追踪; traditional Chinese: 無悔追蹤; pinyin: Wú Huǐ Zhuī Zōng). Set in Beijing, the film spans nearly four decades and stars Lei Jiayin and Hu Ge opposite each other.

== Plot ==
In 1949, during the days leading up to Proclamation of the People's Republic of China, Feng Jingbo, a commissioned Lt. Colonel of Bureau of Investigation and Statistics (BIS) with code number 5182, receives an order from his superior Yan Diankun to stay behind to collect intelligence, while others retreat to Hong Kong and Taiwan. Xiao Dali, a dedicated and stubborn local public security officer of the new republic, becomes highly suspicious of Feng during the Campaign to Suppress Counterrevolutionaries. He believes Feng to be a Kuomintang sleeper agent because of the latter's unexpected familiarity with ceremonial cannons, despite the guise of a schoolteacher. Xiao thus moves into the same hutong where Feng lives, keeping his suspect under constant surveillance.

Over the next 35 plus years, against the backdrop of China's historical shifts, from the Great Leap Forward and the Cultural Revolution to Reform and opening up and the Battle of Laoshan, Xiao plays cat and mouse with Feng. The two men grow old side-by-side as ordinary neighbors, locked in a silent, bitter ideological rivalry that defines both of their lives.

Unbeknownst to the two, BIS has been reorganized in 1955 and its spymaster Mao Renfeng passes away in 1956. Feng's former boss Yan has become a rich merchant from Hong Kong and has been courted by the United Front Work Department in the 1960s. Years later Feng meets Yan again at a wedding event, but is forgotten by the latter. After jogging Yan’s memory and learning that he is obsolete, Feng finally decides to confess to Xiao and the two families become in-laws due to their children's romantic bonds. The film ends with the two watching the 2008 Summer Olympics while arguing over the name of their newborn great-grandson.

== Cast ==
- Lei Jiayin as Xiao Dali, the head of a local police station
- Hu Ge as Feng Jingbo, a primary school teacher and long-term undercover agent
- Chuai Ni as Liu Yaqin, Xiao Dali's wife
- Zhang Yao as Liu Yemei, Feng Jingbo's wife
- Lin Xiaofan as Xiao Xinwei, Xiao Dali's eldest son
- Yang Shuyi as Feng Kangmei, Feng Jingbo's daughter
- Liu Peiqi as Wang Liujin, another spy
- Jiang Wu as Uncle Bao
- Yu Hewei as Yan Diankun, Feng Jingbo's direct superior and high-ranking undercover agent

== Production ==
I Know Who You Are marks the first collaboration among director Feng Xiaogang and lead actors Lei Jiayin and Hu Ge. Principal photography took place in Hainan.

== Release ==
The film was released in China on June 19, 2026. On July 3, 2026, it was released in the United States. Achieving a score of 7.5 on Douban, the box office has not been satisfactory and is said to be caused by the director's much earlier insult towards the audience's intelligence. The movie is said to have been censored for several places not according to the director's will.

== Reception ==
The film's audience reception was described as mixed. Hubei Daily compared the film with Dear You (2026), arguing that it placed "excessive emphasis on historical narrative at the expense of emotional engagement", while World Journal reported that common criticism focused on the screenplay's pacing, narrative style, and period setting.

Michael Ngan, writing for Mirror Daily, argued that the film's poor reception reflected "intensifying tensions between the grassroots and the elite", as working-class audiences had little interest in a "didactic" film and resented China's entertainment elite. Steven Tian of The Storm Media wrote that the film exemplified "a common approach in contemporary Chinese cultural works beneath its commercial packaging", which "downplays ideological confrontation in favor of emphasizing a community with a shared future in which 'you are part of me, and I am part of you'", presenting "a subtler form of propaganda by transforming historical trauma and questions of identity into a warm, everyday narrative".
