= Lu Yang =

Chinese film director and screenwriter (born 1979)

- Born: 1979 (age 46–47); Beijing, China
- Education: Beijing Film Academy
- Occupations: Film director, screenwriter
- Years active: 2005 - present
- Agent(s): Beijing Ziyou Kujing Film Co., Ltd.

Chinese name
- Traditional Chinese: 路陽
- Simplified Chinese: 路阳
Transcriptions
Standard Mandarin
- Hanyu Pinyin: Lù Yáng

Lu Yang (Chinese: 路阳; born 1979) is a Chinese film director and screenwriter best known for his works My Spectacular Theatre, Brotherhood of Blades and Brotherhood of Blades II: The Infernal Battlefield.

== Early life and education ==
A native of Beijing, Lu Yang graduated from the Beijing Film Academy, where he majored in directing at the Director Department. He once worked in Phoenix Television.

== Career ==
He made his directorial debut Suzhou Bridge in 2005. That same year, he also directed Happy Life.

In 2010, he wrote and directed My Spectacular Theatre, which earned his Best Director of the Debut Award at the 28th Golden Rooster Awards and won the Audience Award at the 15th Busan International Film Festival.

In 2014, he wrote and directed the historical action movie Brotherhood of Blades, for which he received Young Director of the Year Award at the China Film Director Association and Best Director of the Debut Award at the 16th Huading Awards, and was nominated for Best Director of the Debut, Best Director, and Best Film Awards at the 15th Chinese Film Media Awards. It starred Chang Chen, Liu Shishi and Wang Qianyuan. It was also produced by Terence Chang, Wang Donghui and Ling Hong. At the same year, he also directed Ex Fighting, starring Lian Kai, Xiong Naijin, Zhu Dan and Ma Yuan. The film was released on October 14, 2014.

In 2017, he wrote and directed Brotherhood of Blades II: The Infernal Battlefield, a sequel to Brotherhood of Blades. It starred Chang Chen, Yang Mi and Zhang Yi, and it was produced by Ning Hao and Wang Yibing. The film was released in China on July 19, 2017, and has grossed CN¥131 million in China.

== Filmography ==
=== Film ===
Year	English Title	Chinese title	Role	Notes
2005	Suzhou Bridge	《苏州桥》	Director	Short film
2005	Happy Life	《幸福生活》	Director	Short film
2006	Coming Home	《回家》	Director	Short film
2006	No Way Out	《黑白对抗》	Director	TV film
2006	Grey, White and Black	《灰白黑》	Director	
2009		《遍路》	Director	Documentary
2009	Colored Youth	《着色的青春》	Director	
2010	My Spectacular Theatre	《盲人电影院》	Director/ screenwriter	
2011	Confession	《告白》	Director/ screenwriter	Short film
2014	Ex Fighting	《房车奇遇》	Director/ screenwriter	
2014	Brotherhood of Blades	《绣春刀》	Director/ screenwriter	
2017	Brotherhood of Blades II: The Infernal Battlefield	《绣春刀：修罗战场》	Director	
2020	The Sacrifice	《金刚川》	Director	
2021	A Writer's Odyssey	《刺杀小说家》	Director	
2025	A Writer's Odyssey 2	《刺杀小说家2》	Director	

=== TV series ===
Year	English Title	Chinese title	Role	Notes
2008		《天堑·1949》	Director/ screenwriter	
2022	The Wind Blows from Longxi	《风起陇西》	Director	

== Film and TV Awards ==
Year	Nominated work	Category	Award	Result	Notes
2011	My Spectacular Theatre	Best Director of the Debut Award	28th Golden Rooster Awards	Won	
2015	Brotherhood of Blades	Young Director of the Year Award	China Film Director Association	Won	
2015	Brotherhood of Blades	Young Screenwriter of the Year Award	China Film Director Association	Nominated	
2015	Brotherhood of Blades	Best Director of the Debut Award	15th Chinese Film Media Awards	Nominated	
2015	Brotherhood of Blades	Best Director	15th Chinese Film Media Awards	Nominated	
2015	Brotherhood of Blades	Best Film	15th Chinese Film Media Awards	Nominated	
2015	Brotherhood of Blades	Best Director	16th Huading Awards	Won	
