= Su Qing (actress) =

Chinese actress (born 1989)

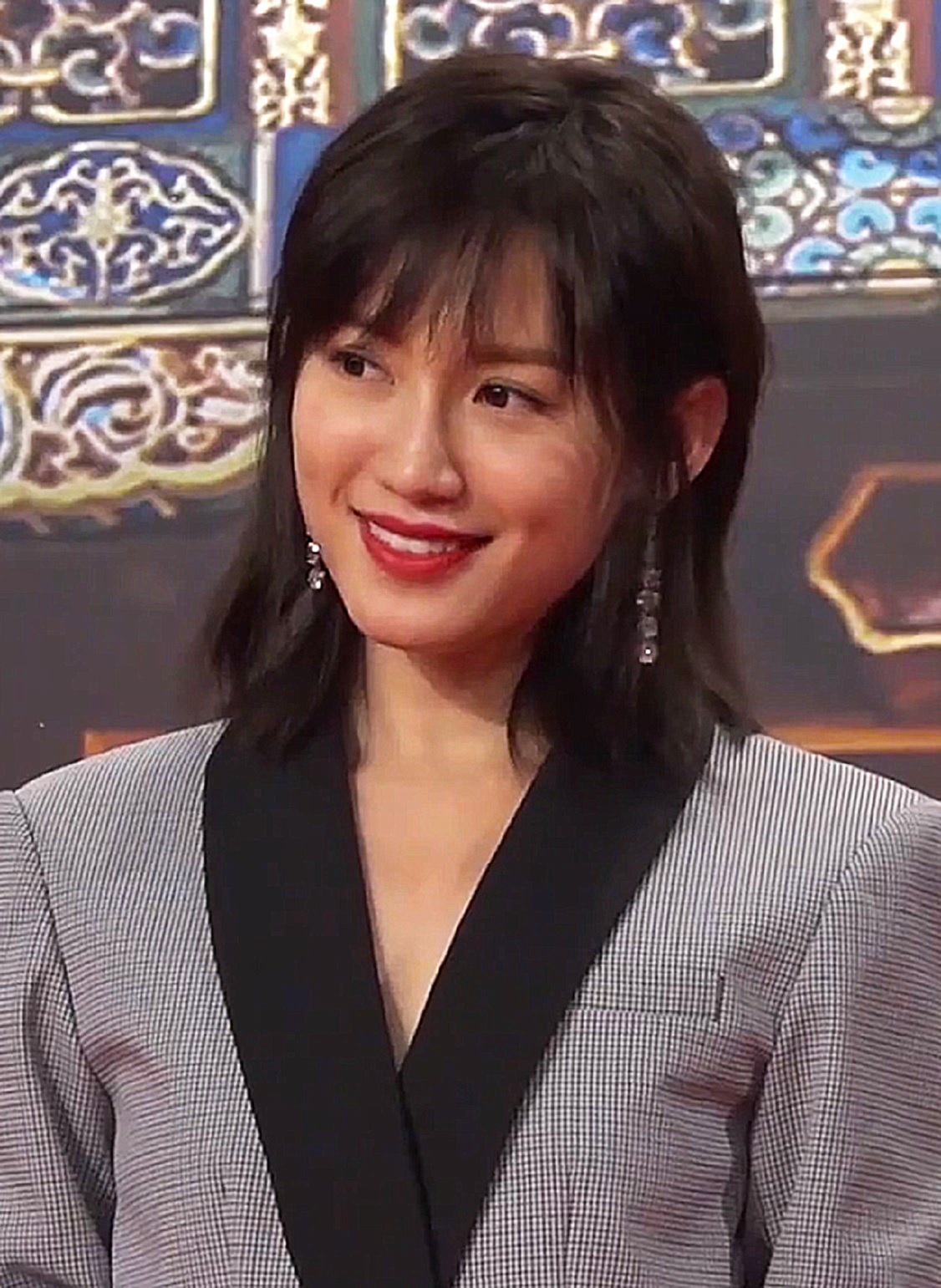
- Su in 2018
- Born: 7 May 1989 (age 37); Hengyang, Hunan, China
- Education: Hunan Mass Media Vocational and Technical College
- Occupation: Actress
- Years active: 2008–present

Chinese name
- Simplified Chinese: 苏青
Transcriptions
Standard Mandarin
- Hanyu Pinyin: Sū Qīng

Su Qing (Chinese: 苏青, born 5 July 1989) is a Chinese actress known for her roles as Zhang Yan in Beauty's Rival in Palace and the antagonist Hitara Erqing in Story of Yanxi Palace.

== Career ==
In 2010, Su first became known for her role as Zhang Yan in the historical drama Beauty's Rival in Palace.

In 2011, Su played her first lead role in the police drama Great Rescue.

In 2012, Su played supporting roles in the historical drama Allure Snow, as well as period romance melodramas A Beauty in Troubled Times, and Beauties at the Crossfire.

In 2014, Su co-starred in the fantasy historical anthology drama Cosmetology High .

In 2015, Su gained recognition for her role as Xu Pingjun in the historical romance drama Love Yunge from the Desert. The same year she co-starred in the action adventure drama The Lost Tomb.

In 2016, Su played the female lead in the war television series Tracks in the Snowy Forest, portraying two different roles.

In 2017, Su starred in the television series Fire Protection Special Force Elite , playing an emergency rescue worker. Su later reprised her role in the web films spin-off, Life and Death Rescue and Escape From Fire.

In 2018, Su starred in the historical drama Story of Yanxi Palace. She became widely known for her antagonist role as Erqing in the pan-Asian hit. The same year, she starred in the romance drama Never Gone, and xianxia drama Battle Through the Heavens.

In 2019, Su played one of the female leads, A'zhu in the wuxia drama Demi-Gods and Semi-Devils, based on the novel of the same name by Louis Cha. She also starred in wuxia romance drama The New Version of the Condor Heroes, portraying Lin Chaoying. The same year, Su was cast in the political drama People's Justice as a prosecutor, the sequel to the hit drama In the Name of the People.

== Filmography ==
=== Film ===
Year	English title	Chinese title	Role	Notes	Ref.
2006	Summer Palace	颐和园	Princess Rongling		
2008		牛铃轻歌	Fang Xiaohui		
2008		渔蚌记	Ke Tingting		
2008	208	-	Ouyang Xiaoyi		
2009		雨淋湿的翅膀	Ai Ye		
2010		绑架冰淇淋	Ah Lv		
2010	Detective Dee and the Mystery of the Phantom Flame	狄仁杰之通天帝国	Hua Kui		
2010	The Doctor And His Brother	安道全与王定六	Li Qiaonv		
2012		警戒线	Ke Xiaoman		
2019	Life and Death Rescue	特勤精英之生死救援	Ye Yifan		
2019	Escape From Fire	特勤精英之逃出生天	Ye Yifan		

=== Television series ===
Year	English title	Chinese title	Role	Notes/Ref.
2007	Confused Angel	糊涂小天使	Bu Gaoxing	
2010	Beauty's Rival in Palace	美人心计	Zhang Yan	
2011	Great Rescue	生死大营救	Liu Li	
2011	Beauty World	唐宮美人天下	Wang Yuqian	Cameo
2012	Allure Snow	倾城雪	Li Mingjuan	
2012	Mother's Garden	爱在屋檐下	He Meina	
2012	Beauties of the Emperor	王的女人	Yue Ya'er	Cameo
2012		铁血男儿	Zhang Miaoling	
2012	A Beauty in Troubled Times	乱世佳人	Zhang Xiaodie	
2013	Beauties at the Crossfire	烽火佳人	Liu Yan	
2014	Cosmetology High	美人制造	Yun Jingchu	
2014	Crazy for Palace 2	我为宫狂2	Empress	Cameo
2015	Jin Yuyao	金玉瑶	Yan Xiaoxu	
2015	The Lost Tomb	盗墓笔记	Wang Fei	
2015	Love Yunge from the Desert	大汉情缘之云中歌	Xu Pingjun	
2016	Tracks in the Snowy Forest	雪海	Hua Man	
2016	Transition from Liping	生死黎平	Hai Yun	
2016	Idol Hunter	偶像猎手	Fu Yuxi	
2017	Kun Lun Que	昆仑阙之前世今生	Zu Luo	
2017	Fire Protection Special Force Elite	特勤精英	Ye Yifan	
2018	Story of Yanxi Palace	延禧攻略	Hitara Erqing	
2018	The Dream and the Glory	那些年，我们正年轻	Lu Ruowen	
2018	Battle Through the Heavens	斗破苍穹	Yun Yun	
2018	Never Gone	原来你还在这里	Mo Yuhua	
2018	I'm Not an Agent	我不是特工	Duan Siqi	
2020	Sheng Suan	胜算	Cai Meng	Lead Role
2020	Thorn	刺	Han Xiaoting	
2020	Heroes in Harm’s Way	最美逆行者		
2020	Beijing Xicheng Story	幸福里的春天	Hu Meihua	
2020	People's Justice	人民的正义		
2020	The New Version of the Condor Heroes	新神雕侠侣	Lin Chaoying	
2020	Demi-Gods and Semi-Devils	天龙八部	A'Zhu	

== Discography ==
Year	English title	Chinese title	Role	Notes
2018	"Forgetting About Each Other"	相忘	Story of Yanxi Palace OST	
2018	"Healer's Heart"	医心	Battle Through the Heavens OST	
2020	"Lucky Survivor"	幸存者	Thorn OST	

== Awards and nominations ==
Year	Event	Category	Nominated work	Result	Ref.
2019	6th The Actors of China Award Ceremony	Best Actress (Web series)	Never Gone	Nominated	
