= Brotherhood of Blades =

2014 Chinese film by Lu Yang

- Film poster
- Directed by: Lu Yang
- Written by: Chen Shu; Lu Yang
- Produced by: Terence Chang; Wang Donghui; Ling Hong
- Starring: Chang Chen; Cecilia Liu; Wang Qianyuan
- Cinematography: Han Qiming
- Edited by: Zhu Liyun; Tu Yiran
- Music by: Nathan Wang
- Release date: 7 August 2014
- Running time: 106 minutes
- Country: China
- Language: Mandarin
- Budget: CN¥30 million
- Box office: CN¥93.37 million

Brotherhood of Blades (绣春刀) is a 2014 Chinese wuxia film directed by Lu Yang. Set in 17th-century China during the Ming dynasty, the story follows three jinyiwei officers who are ordered to hunt down the treacherous court eunuch Wei Zhongxian and his faction. Starring Chang Chen, Cecilia Liu and Wang Qianyuan, the film was released in China on August 7, 2014.

A prequel, Brotherhood of Blades II: The Infernal Battlefield, was released in China on July 19, 2017.

== Synopsis ==
In 1627, the newly enthroned Chongzhen Emperor is determined to eliminate corruption in the Ming government, so he removes the influential court eunuch Wei Zhongxian from power and sends him to Fengyang to keep watch over the Ming Ancestors Mausoleum.

Lu Jianxing, Shen Lian and Jin Yichuan are three sworn brothers serving in the jinyiwei, the Ming government's secret police. Lu Jianxing, known for being loyal and honest, strives to get promoted. Years ago, Shen Lian had fallen in love with Zhou Miaotong, who had been sold to a brothel, and he hopes to buy her freedom. Jin Yichuan, who suffers from tuberculosis, is harassed by his senior Ding Xiu, who knows a secret about his background.

While Wei Zhongxian is en route to Fengyang, Eastern Depot supervisor Zhao Jingzhong receives an order from the Chongzhen Emperor to kill Wei. He handpicks Lu Jianxing, Shen Lian and Jin Yichuan to carry it out. They catch up with Wei Zhongxian and his escorts at an inn in Fucheng. While Lu Jianxing and Jin Yichuan are fighting the escorts, Shen Lian meets Wei Zhongxian, who offers him money in exchange for sparing him. Tempted by the thought that he can finally buy Zhou Miaotong's freedom, Shen Lian accepts Wei Zhongxian's offer and helps the eunuch fake his death. Shen Lian's decision will ultimately bring disaster to his two brothers-in-arms.

== Cast ==
- Chang Chen as Shen Lian
- Cecilia Liu as Zhou Miaotong
- Wang Qianyuan as Lu Jianxing
- Ethan Li as Jin Yichuan
- Nie Yuan as Zhao Jingzhong
- Chin Shih-chieh as Wei Zhongxian
- Ye Qing as Zhang Yan
- Zhou Yiwei as Ding Xiu
- Zhu Dan as Wei Ting
- Zhao Lixin as Han Kuang
- Ye Xiangming as the Chongzhen Emperor

== Production ==
The story of Brotherhood of Blades was written by directors Lu Yang and Chen Shu. The script was already completed by the time Yu's debut feature My Spectacular Theatre was released in 2010. The film received funding only after Chang Chen had committed to the role of Shen Lian. The film received CN¥30 million (US$5 million) from China Film and was shot in 67 days.

== Release ==
Brotherhood of Blades was released on August 7, 2014, in China. Derek Elley of Film Business Asia wrote that the film was shown "with relatively little fanfare and a poor marketing campaign that harmed its box office in a strong field". At the end of its run, the film has earned CN¥90 million (US$14 million) in China.

The film was shown at the Busan International Film Festival in October 2014.

== Reception ==
Derek Elley of Film Business Asia gave the film an eight out of ten ratings, calling it a "Top-notch martial-arts drama boasts a meaty script and performances to match" and "the most satisfying Chinese wuxia movie since Reign of Assassins"

Film and arts writer Philippa Hawker of Sydney Morning Herald gave the film 4.5 out of 5, praising the movie as "a gripping, entertaining martial arts drama in which the cut-and-thrust of the narrative is as important as the swordplay action. It's a film of plot twists and turns and moral ambiguities punctuated with combat scenes, an ensemble piece with strong performances and an involving storyline."

== Awards and nominations ==
Year	Award	Category	Recipient	Result
2014	51st Golden Horse Awards	Best Actor	Chang Chen	Nominated
2014	51st Golden Horse Awards	Best Supporting Actor	Chin Shih-chieh	Nominated
2014	51st Golden Horse Awards	Best Editing	Zhu Li Yun, Tu Yi Ran	Nominated
2014	51st Golden Horse Awards	Best Costume Design	Liang Ting Ting	Won
2014	51st Golden Horse Awards	Best Action Design	Sang Lin	Nominated
