= Time Fengjun Entertainment =

Chinese multimedia film and TV entertainment company

- Native name: 時代峰峻
- Romanized name: Shídài fēng jùn
- Type: Public
- Industry: Entertainment
- Founded: 6 August 2009; 17 years ago
- Headquarters: No. 8, Xitong Road, Economic Development Zone, Miyun District, Beijing, China
- Divisions: Chengdu Office, Chaoyang Branch, Chongqing Branch
- USCC: 911102286932696778
- Website: http://www.tfent.cn

Beijing Time Fengjun Culture and Art Development Co., Ltd. (Chinese: 北京时代峰峻文化艺术发展有限公司; pinyin: Běijīng shídài fēng jùn wénhuà yìshù fāzhǎn yǒuxiàn gōngsī), often shortened to Time Fengjun, is a Chinese entertainment company. In addition to talent management, it also produces film, television, music, and variety shows.

== History ==
In 2009, Time Fengjun was registered in Beijing and established the trainee training organization "TF Family" in Chongqing.

== Boy groups ==
- TFBoys
- TNT
- 登陸少年 (abbreviated as T.O.P or TransformProject)

== Controversies ==
=== Accusations of fraud ===
In August 2017, TFBOYS held two "AliveFour" concerts in Nanjing for their fourth anniversary. However, unlike previous concerts, ticket purchases required premium membership of one year or more, which would give buyers a code for the purchase. This caused Time Fengjun's website to lag and crash, and only a few fans were able to get the ticket purchase code. Afterwards, Time Fengjun blamed it on the negligence of their staff. Some fans reported Time Fengjun to the Beijing Miyun District Industrial and Commercial Bureau, where the company is located, for fraud. The bureau has since began investigation.

=== Voting controversy ===
In June 2020, 270 tickets were sold under the name of a summer sports event, generating over 2.6 million RMB in total revenue, with an average price close to 10,000 RMB per ticket. Due to TF Entertainment's repeated auction-style events and ticket sales for performances, eight fan clubs jointly boycotted the event.

In September, TF Entertainment produced a music promotion program titled Youth On Fire for the TNT. On 16 October, the group's official fan club launched a voting event for the "Most Popular Collaborative Stage". According to the voting results, the top three performances received virtual gifts equivalent to approximately 6.4 million RMB, 5.5 million RMB, and 230,000 RMB respectively. The top eight performances received a total of about 12.5 million RMB in virtual gifts.

The company had promised special perks—exclusive performance videos—for fans who participated in the voting. However, these perks were never delivered. On 2 September 2021, the company issued a statement claiming that offering value-added services to paid members did not violate current laws, and the relevant ranking system was later changed to a free format.

=== Huang Yuhang contract controversy ===
On 26 December 2016, Huang Yuhang's legal guardian sent a legal letter to TF Entertainment requesting termination of the signed contracts and agreements.

On 22 January 2017, TF Entertainment responded, demanding that Huang Yuhang continue to fulfill the existing talent management contract.

On 1 January 2017, Huang Yuhang authorized Original Painting Culture (Chinese: 原际画; pinyin: Yuán jì huà) to use his name, image, voice, and performances. On 22 March, TF Entertainment filed for arbitration with the Chongqing Arbitration Commission, seeking a ruling that Huang must fulfill his talent contract. On 29 March, TF Entertainment, through Dayue Law Firm in Beijing, sent a legal notice asserting that both Yan Haoxiang and Huang Yuhang had valid contracts with the company and no third party was allowed to cooperate with them in performance-related matters.

On 1 June the Chongqing Arbitration Commission issued ruling No. (2017) Yuzhongzi 478, ordering Huang Yuhang to continue honoring the contract with TF Entertainment.

On 16 June 2017, Huang Yuhang himself applied for arbitration with the Chongqing Arbitration Commission, requesting termination of his contract with the company. On 4 July, TF Entertainment issued a statement reiterating the contents of the prior legal notice and expressing willingness to resolve the dispute with both Huang and Yan through negotiation. On 12 July, Huang Yuhang sent a termination notice to TF Entertainment, stating that the talent management and training contracts would be void once the notice was received.

On 28 March 2018, the Chongqing Arbitration Commission issued ruling No. (2017) Yuzhongzi 1162, declaring the contract terminated as of that date and ordering Huang to pay over 1.65 million RMB in training fees and damages to TF Entertainment.

=== Poaching accusations ===
On 31 March 2017, the official Weibo account of Original Painting Culture posted an image stating that Huang Yuhang and Yan Haoxiang were not TF Entertainment artists, the contracts signed with TF were invalid, and TF was stalling negotiations while restricting the duo's performance activities. The post received 1,790 shares and 1,776 comments.

On the same day, TF Entertainment sent a legal letter to Huang Rui, the legal representative of Original Painting Culture and former planning director at TF, accusing him of illegally poaching former trainees Huang Yuhang, Yan Haoxiang, and Huang Qilin to debut under the group "Yi'an Music Club". Original Painting Culture claimed the actions were voluntary and not illegal. The case was accepted by Shanghai's Putuo District People's Court.

In October 2018, the court ruled that the Weibo post by Original Painting Culture was inconsistent with arbitration results, deviated from objective facts, was publicly visible to internet users, went beyond clarifying facts, and negatively impacted TF Entertainment. The court concluded that the post constituted commercial defamation against TF.

Regarding the dispute over Original Painting Culture's use of Huang Yuhang's image and video, the court held that the matter had been resolved through arbitration and did not constitute unfair competition under the Anti-Unfair Competition Law.

The final ruling required Original Painting Culture to delete the Weibo post, publish a public apology, and compensate TF Entertainment 30,000 RMB in economic losses. All other claims were rejected.

=== Chongqing headquarters relocation controversy ===
On 15 August 2026, several livestreamers gathered outside the Time Fengjun office and training facility at Changjiang International to livestream footage of underage trainees entering and leaving the building, as well as female fans waiting on-site. Fans present deemed the filming harmful and harassing to the trainees and demanded it stop, leading to a verbal altercation between the two parties.

On 17 August, a group of netizens gathered outside the Chongqing headquarters, resulting in a physical confrontation. Police officers arrived and removed a man suspected of splashing water for further investigation; videos of the incident circulated on social media, sparking widespread discussion.

On 18 August, fueled by online discourse, a large number of netizens and Time Fengjun fans gathered again outside the Chongqing headquarters. Arguments and confrontations ensued, with some individuals waving the national flag, singing the national anthem, and demanding the release of the person detained earlier. Police cleared the area and managed the crowd, implementing temporary traffic controls on sections of Nanbin Road.

On 20 August, the Nan'an Branch of the Chongqing Public Security Bureau issued a statement reporting that the individuals involved had received legal education and that further investigations and legal actions would be taken against those suspected of disturbing public order. The police also reminded the public to abide by the law and urged young people to support their idols in a rational and civilized manner.

As a result of the incident, most items have been removed from the "18th floor" at Changjiang International, and no staff members remain on-site. Security personnel at the location confirmed that the "18th floor has been emptied," and reports indicate that police also confirmed the items were moved out overnight recently.
