= At Cafe 6 =

- Poster
- Chinese: 六弄咖啡馆
- Directed by: Neal Wu
- Screenplay by: Neal Wu; Ho Su-fen; Cheng Yuen-Cheng; Liao Ming-yi
- Produced by: Liu Jie
- Starring: Dong Zijian; Cherry Ngan; Austin Lin; Ouyang Nini; Song Yiren
- Cinematography: Liu You-Nian
- Edited by: Liao Ming-yi
- Production companies: Huashi Media Investment (Beijing); Creative Lightyear; Zhejiang Wishart Pictures; Beijing Baidu Nuomi Information Technology
- Distributed by: Beijing Orient Media
- Release dates: July 15, 2016 (Taiwan); July 29, 2016 (China)
- Countries: China; Taiwan
- Language: Mandarin
- Box office: CN¥6.5 million

At Cafe 6 is a 2016 Chinese-Taiwanese romance film directed by Neal Wu and starring Dong Zijian, Cherry Ngan, Austin Lin, Ouyang Nini and Song Yiren. It was released in Taiwan on July 15, 2016 and in China on July 29, 2016.

== Plot ==
On a rainy night, Miss Liang argues with her long-distance boyfriend. She would've gone back home after an extra shift, had her car not broken down. She followed a bearded passerby to a place address that was not in the sixth lane, but was named “Street Six Cafe” to look for shelter from rain. The owner served a cup of unsweetened cappuccino and told a story that took place in the summer of 1996. (Due to the turmoil of the “political stance” of Dai Liren, who plays the role of a cafe owner, this part of the clip was deleted when it was released in mainland China.)

That year they were in high school. Guan Minlü or Xiao Lu (Dong Zijian) played with his friend Xiao Bozhi (Austin Lin). Xiao Lu has a crush on his classmate Li Xinrui or Xiao Rui (Cherry Ngan), but she always had Cai Xinyi (Ouyang Nini) right beside her, and her classmates Song Yiren (Song Yiren) who had crush on Xiao Lu. They were in the same class, yet the distance between Xiao Lu and Xiao Rui is far apart. Even if love can blossom, can the long distance after high school graduation, hold the hearts as if they were now, not separating from each other and be with each other?

== Cast ==
- Dong Zijian as Guan Minlü
- Cherry Ngan as Li Xinrui
- Austin Lin as Xiao Bozhi
- Ouyang Nini as Cai Xinyi
- Song Yiren as Song Yiren
- Frankie Huang as Gangster

== Awards and nominations ==
Year	Award	Category	Recipient	Result
2016	19th Shanghai International Film Festival	China Movie Channel Media Awards Best Supporting Actress	Ouyang Nini	Nominated
2016	19th Shanghai International Film Festival	China Movie Channel Media Awards for Best New Actor	Austin Lin	Won
2016	19th Shanghai International Film Festival	China Movie Channel Media Awards for Best New Actress	Cherry Ngan	Won
2016	19th Shanghai International Film Festival	China Movie Channel Media Awards Best New Director	Neal Wu	Nominated
2016	53rd Golden Horse Awards	Best Supporting Actor	Austin Lin	Won
2017	9th Strait Film And Television Season Awards	Most Popular Movie	At Cafe 6	Won
2017	1st PIFFA Supreme Awards	Best Supporting Actor	Austin Lin	Nominated
2017	1st PIFFA Supreme Awards	Best Cinematography	Younian Liu	Nominated
2017	1st PIFFA Supreme Awards	Best Film Editor	Ka Fai Cheung	Nominated
2017	1st PIFFA Supreme Awards	Best New Director	Neal Wu	Won
