= Jiao Junyan =

Chinese actress

- 焦俊艳
- Born: May 6, 1987 (age 39); Ma'anshan, Anhui, China
- Education: Beijing Film Academy
- Occupation: Actress
- Years active: 2009-present

Chinese name
- Traditional Chinese: 焦俊艷
- Simplified Chinese: 焦俊艳
Transcriptions
Standard Mandarin
- Hanyu Pinyin: Jiāo Jùnyàn

Jiao Junyan (Chinese: 焦俊艳; born 6 May 1987) is a Chinese actress, best known for her role as Fang Huihui on When Larry Met Mary (2016) and has also starred in a number of films and television series, including Love Is Not Blind (2011), Editorial Department Story (2013), Lala's Shining Days (2013), Bunshinsaba 3 (2014), Noble Aspirations (2016), Medical Examiner Dr. Qin (2016), and Detective Dee (2017).

== Early life and education ==
Jiao was born in Ma'anshan, Anhui, on May 6, 1987. She graduated from Beijing Film Academy, where she majored in acting.

== Acting career ==
Jiao made her television debut in Newcomers to the Middle-Aged (2009). Her first role in a movie came with the romance film Rest on Your Shoulder.

In 2010, she appeared in Tea House, a television adaptation based on the drama of the same name by Lao She. The same year, she starred in the spy drama Eternal Wave.

Jiao next starred in the romance television series Never Say Goodbye (2011). She played a supporting role in the war television series The Shengtianmen Gate.

In 2012, she was cast in the suspense drama Trapped. She had a cameo appearance in Lonely Army Hero, a war television series.

In 2013, she headlined two television series, Editorial Department Story and Lala's Shining Days. She rose to fame after portraying Ou Xiaomi in the romance television series Editorial Department Story. She became widely known to audiences with Lala's Shining Days, the sequel to 2010's Go Lala Go!.

Jiao was cast as Yuanyuan in the Ahn Byeong-ki's horror film Bunshinsaba 3 (2014), which premiered on July 4, 2014. The same year, she played a supporting role in the comedy film Breakup Buddies.

In 2015, Jiao played the female lead opposite Jing Chao in military drama Youth Assemble.

In 2016, Jiao played the role of Feng Huihui in Wen Zhang's film When Larry Met Mary, for which she received a Best Supporting Actress nomination at the 31st Golden Rooster Awards. She then played a key supporting role as Jin Ping'er in Noble Aspirations, based on the fantasy novel Zhu Xian by Xiao Ding.

The same year Jiao starred in crime drama Medical Examiner Dr. Qin, opposite Zhang Ruoyun and Li Xian. The series gained over 1.5 billion views on Sohu TV, and earned praise for its storyline and performance. She then starred in the romance film Remembering Lichuan with Godfrey Gao, which received positive reviews.

In 2017, Jiao starred as Wu Zetian, reuniting her with co-star Ren Jialun, who played Di Renjie, in historical television series Detective Dee. She also starred in the female-centric romance drama Solaso Bistro. The same year, she starred inntwo films, Goldbuster and Hanson and the Beast. She appeared as Ah Ping, a network host, in Sandra Ng's directorial debut Goldbuster. She also participated in Hanson and the Beast, a fantasy comedy film.

In 2018, Jiao starred in police drama Caught in the Heartbeat.

In 2019, Jiao was cast in the legal drama Perfect Evidence.

== Filmography ==
=== Film ===
Year	English title	Chinese title	Role	Notes
2011	Rest on Your Shoulder	肩上蝶	Xiaoyi	
2011	Love Is Not Blind	失恋33天	Feng Jiaqi	
2012	Baby Don't Cry	宝贝别哭	Qin Ting	
2014	Bunshinsaba 3	笔仙3	Yuanyuan	
2014	Breakup Buddies	心花怒放	Xiaobei	
2016	When Larry Met Mary	陆垚知马俐	Fang Huihui	
2016	The Peaceful Island	平安岛	Liu Jia	
2017	Goldbuster	妖铃铃	Ah Ping	
2017	Hanson and the Beast	二代妖精之今生有幸	Jia Bingbing	
2019	Midnight Diner	深夜食堂		
2019	The Captain	中国机长		Cameo
2019	Hunt Down	长安道		
2019	Gone with the Light	被光抓走的人		

=== Television series ===
Year	English title	Chinese title	Role	Notes
2009	Newcomers to the Middle-Aged	人到中年	He Tiantian	
2009	My Ex-wife's Wedding	跟我的前妻谈恋爱	Wang Jianjun	
2010	Tea House	茶馆	Da Xiu	
2010	Eternal Wave	永不消逝的电波	He Lanfen	
2010	Friends	朋友一场	Bi Yuting	
2011	Never Say Goodbye	说好不分手	Leng Mei	
2011	The Shengtianmen Gate	圣天门口	Xue Ning	
2012	Cold Storm	冷风暴	Yi Rongrong	
2012	Trapped	步步杀机	Tong Yanmei	
2012	Lonely Army Hero	孤军英雄	Bai Xueling	
2013	Editorial Department Story	新编辑部故事	Ou Xiaomi	
2013	Lala's Shining Days	杜拉拉之似水年华	Du Lala	
2013	Longmen Express	龙门镖局	Ah Mei	Cameo
2014	Happy 36 Tactics	幸福36计	Li Wenyu	
2014	Three Days in the House	囧爸的爱情生活	Du Xiaoyu	
2014	Hahaha Restaurant	哈哈笑餐厅		Cameo
2014	The Young Doctor	青年医生	Zhu Yun	Cameo
2015	Youth Assemble	青春集结号	Ye Duoduo	
2015	Legend of Ban Shu	班淑传奇	Ah Yue	Cameo
2016	Eat Drink Man and Woman	饮食男女	Bai Jingjing	Cameo
2016	Plastic Surgery Season	整容季		Cameo
2016	Noble Aspirations	青云志	Jin Ping'er	
2016	Remembering Lichuan	遇见王沥川	Xie Xiaoqiu	
2016	Medical Examiner Dr. Qin	法医秦明	Li Dabao	
2016	Happy MiTan	欢喜密探		Cameo
2017	Solaso Bistro	问题餐厅	Tang Yu	
2017	Detective Dee	通天狄仁杰	Wu Zetian	
2018	The Evolution of Our Love	爱情进化论		Cameo
2018	Caught in the Heartbeat	青春警事	Gu Jing	
2020	Farewell to Arms	烽烟尽处	Meng Xiaoyu	
2020	Perfect Evidence	完美证据	Qin Qiaochu	
2020	A Young Couple	加油！小夫妻	Tang Xin	

== Awards and nominations ==
Year	Nominated work	Award	Category	Result	Notes
2017	When Larry Met Mary	31st Golden Rooster Awards	Best Supporting Actress	Nominated	
2017	Solaso Bistro	4th The Actors of China Award Ceremony	Best Actress (Web series)	Won	
2019	Hunt Down	11th Macau International Movie Festival	Best Supporting Actress	Nominated	
