= Qin Ming (forensic doctor) =

Chinese physician (born 1981)

- Born: January 10, 1981 (age 45); Tongling City, Anhui Province, People’s Republic of China
- Occupation: Forensic Doctor
- Writing career
- Pen name: Qin Ming
- Period: 2012～
- Subject: Forensic Doctor
- Notable work: Forensic Doctor Qin Ming

Qin Ming (born January 10, 1981) is a forensic expert and writer from Tongling City, Anhui Province, China. He serves as the director of the Evidence Identification Management Division at the Anhui Provincial Public Security Department, holding the rank of Fourth-Level Police Technical Officer and the title of Associate Chief Forensic Medical Officer. He is a member of the China Writers Association, the Secretary-General of the Anhui Province Forensic Medicine Association, and an executive member of the Anhui Province Public Security Writers Association.

== Biography ==
Qin Ming was born in January 1981 in Tongling City, Anhui Province. His father worked as a criminal police officer specializing in trace evidence for several decades, while his mother was a nurse. In 1998, influenced by his family background, Qin Ming was admitted to the Forensic Medicine program at Wannan Medical College through the college entrance exam. After graduating in 2003, he entered the China Criminal Police College and obtained dual bachelor’s degrees in medicine and law in 2005. That same year, he joined the Anhui Provincial Public Security Department and became a forensic doctor. In April 2011, to help the public better understand forensic medicine, Qin Ming registered a Sina Weibo account under the name “Forensic Doctor Qin Ming” and began sharing popular science content.

In 2012, Qin Ming serialized his first crime fiction novel, Ghost Hand, Buddha Heart – My Cases, on the Tianya Club Lotus Pond Ghost Story section. The novel attracted a large readership, and publishers took notice. Due to his position as a public servant, after reporting to his superiors and receiving approval, the novel was published by Huiji Tianjuan under the title The Corpse Whisperer.In 2015, his novel The Eleventh Finger won the Excellence Award at the first Online Literature Biennale. In 2016, the web series adapted from his original novel Medical Examiner Dr. Qin became a huge hit. In December of the same year, Qin Ming was named CCTV’s “Most Influential Legal Person of the Year” for his impact on public legal education.In June 2018, Qin Ming was approved for membership in the China Writers Association, officially becoming a member.

As of January 2023, Qin Ming has published 13 novels in the Forensic Doctor Qin Ming series. Several film and television adaptations have been made based on the series, including web dramas Medical Examiner Dr. Qin,Medical Examiner Dr. Qin2: Cleaner, Medical Examiner Dr. Qin: The Survivor, and Forensic Doctor Qin Ming: Silent Testimony, as well as the web movie Forensic Doctor Qin Ming: The Soul at the Car’s Rear End and the Forensic Doctor Qin Ming series of web film trilogies, totaling more than ten productions.

On July 20, 2023, the forensic workplace reality show First Job · Forensic Season 2, in which Qin Ming participated in case adaptations and served as a guest, premiered. The show received positive reviews on Douban after its airing. In December 2023, Qin Ming published a revised edition of The Forensic Book, based on his work The Testimony of the Departed.

== Writings ==
- Forensic Doctor Qin Ming Series:The Corpse Whisperer, Silent Testimony, The Eleventh Finger, The Cleaner, The Survivor, The Peeper, The Avenger, The Forgotten, The Doll, The Blank Exam Paper.
- Night Watcher Series:The Night Watcher, The Night Watcher 2: Dark Potential, The Night Watcher 3: Life and Death Blind Spot, The Night Watcher 4: The Evolution.
- The Testimony of the Departed.
- The Burning Hummingbird, The Burning Hummingbird: The Mystery of 1985.
- The Forensic Book.
