= Liu Duan Duan =

Chinese actor, singer and music producer

- 刘端端
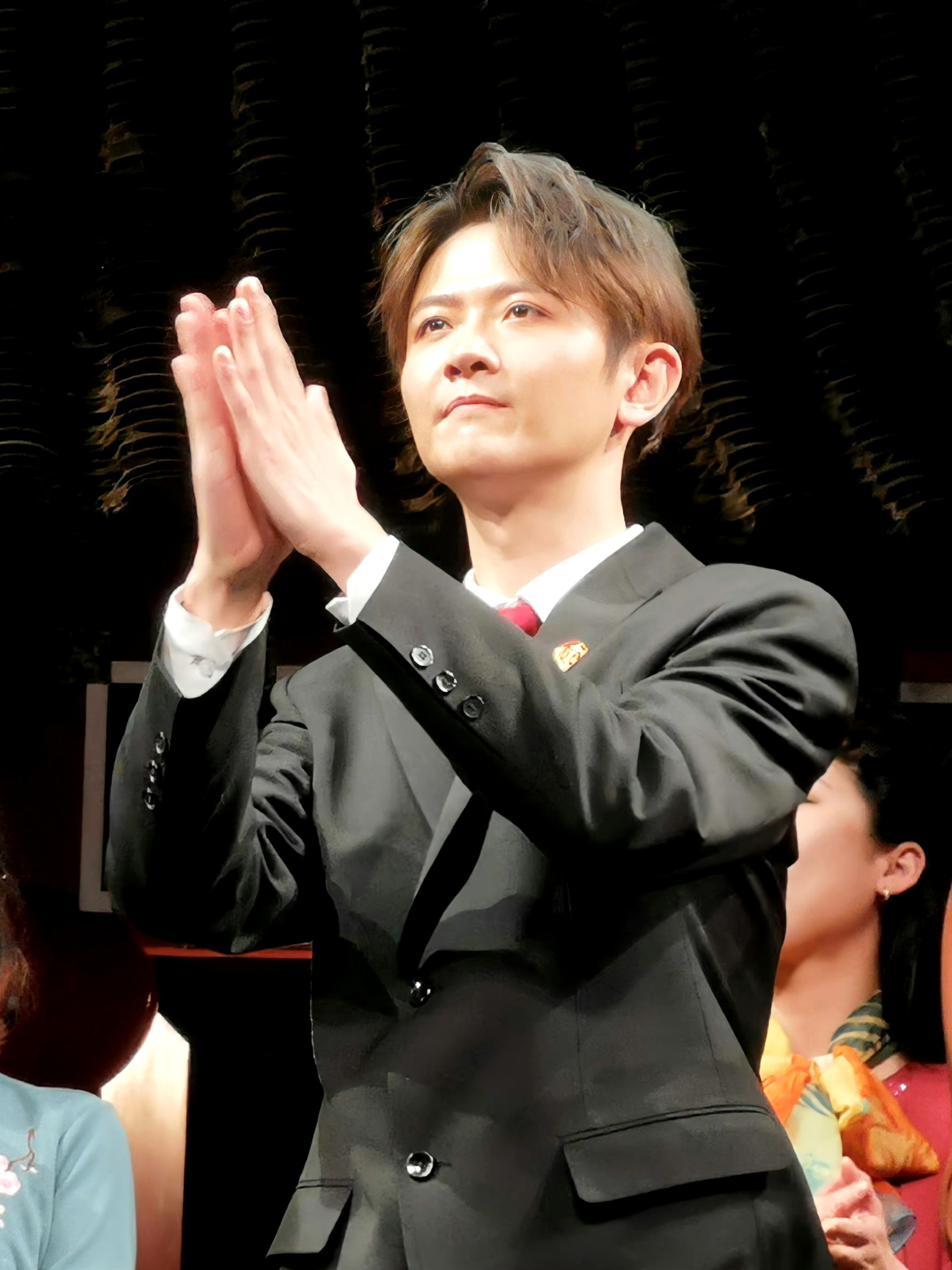
- Liu in 2024
- Born: 4 June 1986 (age 40); Dongcheng District, Beijing, China
- Education: Central Academy of Drama
- Occupations: Actor; Singer; Music producer
- Years active: 2008–present

Chinese name
- Traditional Chinese: 劉端端
- Simplified Chinese: 刘端端
Transcriptions
Standard Mandarin
- Hanyu Pinyin: Liú Duān Duān

Liu Duan Duan (Chinese: 刘端端) is a Chinese actor, singer, and music producer. He is a member of the National Theatre Company of China. His works include the film Brotherhood of Blades II: The Infernal Battlefield and the television series Joy of Life.

== Early life ==
Liu comes from an acting family. His mother Yan Fanfan is an actress, his maternal grandfather Yan Zhongying is a director, and his maternal grandmother Bai Fengxi is a playwright. In high school, he became the director of the school's radio station and gathered a group of friends to record programs at his home on weekends, where he began using editing software.

== Career ==
=== 2008–2012 ===
After graduating from the Central Academy of Drama in 2008, he joined the National Theatre Company of China and starred in many stage plays. He did not receive preferential treatment due to his family background and mainly played supporting roles, "working for eight hours, and only one hour on stage, and the rest of the time was waiting."

=== 2011 ===
In 2011, Liu met Tan Xuan, a composer, and the two later collaborated to compose music for TV series such as Allure Snow (倾城雪) and Beauty World (唐宫美人天下).

=== 2013–2017 ===
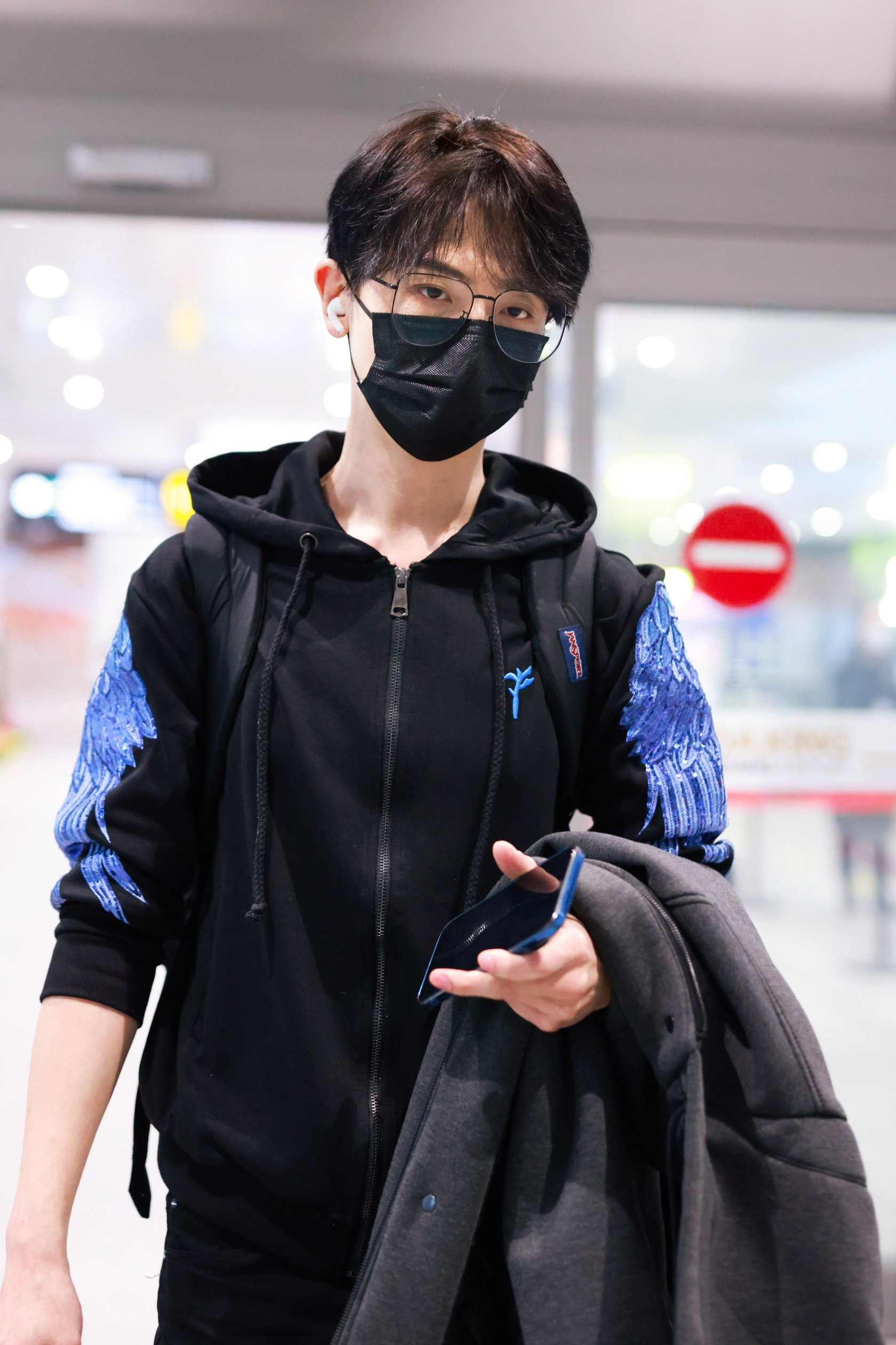
Liu at Airport

Beginning in 2013, Liu began taking on film and television roles, stating "an actor needs to let more people know him and can't isolate himself." His work in 2013's The Great Protector (镖门), 2015's Young Marshal (少帅), and 2017's Brotherhood of Blades II: The Infernal Battlefield was well-received.

Liu continued his music career as well. In 2016, he composed and sang the opening theme "Crazy Love (疯狂爱)" for the drama May December Love 2 (小丈夫). The song topped KuGou for three consecutive days.

=== 2019 ===
In 2019, Liu starred as the second prince in the television series Joy of Life and received widespread acclaim and popularity for the role.

== Filmography ==
=== Film ===
Year	Title	Role	Notes	Ref.
2017	Brotherhood of Blades II: The Infernal Battlefield	繡春刀2：修羅戰場	Chongzhen Emperor	
2019	Jade Dynasty	誅仙 I	Qi Hao	

=== Television series ===
Year	English title	Chinese title	Role	Notes	Ref.
2008	Centennial Rongbaozhai	百年榮寶齋	Japanese soldier	Cameo	
2008	Royal Tramp	鹿鼎記	Ao Biao	Cameo	
2010	Lohas	樂活家庭	Duan Duan	Cameo	
2014	The Great Protector	鏢門	Xie Hai		
2015	Hei, Lao Tou'er	嘿，老頭！	Yi Zhi		
2015	Young Marshal	少帥	Zhang Xuecheng		
2016	I want to make you happy	真心想讓你幸福	Hong Wei		
2016	Hey, Kids	嘿,孩子	Bar assailant	Cameo	
2017	A Splendid Life in Beijing	生逢燦爛的日子	Guo Xiaoyang	Young version	
2017	Detective Dee	通天狄仁杰	Emperor Taizong of Tang		
2018	Distant home	遠方的家 (電視劇)	Song Fei		
2019	We Are All Going To Be Good!	我们都要好好的	Hu Nan		
2019	Joy of Life	慶餘年	Li Chengze	Season I	
2021	Monarch Industry	上陽賦	Song Huai'en		
2021	Luoyang	風起洛陽	Prince Dongchuan		
2021	Sword Snow Stride	雪中悍刀行	Zhao Kai		
2023	Dwelling in the Fuchun Mountains	富春山居	Xu Jiafu		
2023	Days with Ambition and Pride	鐵馬豪情的日子	Xiao Liu/Qiao Zhong	filmed in 2019	
2023	Weaving a Tale of Love Season II	風起西州	Qu Chongyu		
2024	Joy of Life	慶餘年	Li Chengze	Season II	
2025	The Prisoner Of Beauty	折腰	Wei Yan		
TBA	Thunder Chaser	雷霆令	Li Xiao		
