= Dear My Friends =

2016 South Korean television series

- Promotional poster
- Hangul: 디어 마이 프렌즈
- RR: Dieo mai peurenjeu
- MR: Tiŏ mai p'ŭrenjŭ
- Genre: Drama
- Written by: Noh Hee-kyung
- Directed by: Hong Jong-chan
- Starring: Go Hyun-jung; Kim Hye-ja; Na Moon-hee; Go Doo-shim; Park Won-sook; Youn Yuh-jung; Joo Hyun; Kim Young-ok; Shin Goo
- Narrated by: Go Hyun-jung
- Theme music composer: Choi In-hee; The Chairman; Yoo Young-jun
- Opening theme: "Go Go! Picnic" by Martin Smith
- Country of origin: South Korea
- Original language: Korean
- No. of episodes: 16

Production
- Executive producers: Bae Jong-byung; Jinnie Jin-hee Choi; Kim Kyu-tae
- Producers: Lee Jong-ok; Lee Jeong-mook
- Production locations: South Korea; Slovenia; Croatia
- Production companies: Studio Dragon; GT Entertainment

Original release
- Network: tvN
- Release: May 13 – July 2, 2016

Dear My Friends (Korean: 디어 마이 프렌즈) is a South Korean television series starring Go Hyun-jung, Kim Hye-ja, Na Moon-hee, Go Doo-shim, Park Won-sook, Youn Yuh-jung, Joo Hyun, Kim Young-ok and Shin Goo. It aired on cable network tvN on Fridays and Saturdays at 20:30 (KST) for 16 episodes from May 13 to July 2, 2016.

== Synopsis ==
The stories between friends in the golden years of their lives. People who say some words like "It is not the end, we're still alive".

== Cast ==
=== Main ===
- Go Hyun-jung as Park Wan – age 37, a Japanese translation writer
- Kim Hye-ja as Jo Hee-ja – age 72
- Na Moon-hee as Moon Jeong-ah – age 72, Hee-ja's classmate, Seok-gyun's wife
- Go Doo-shim as Jang Nan-hee – age 63, Park Wan's mother, Hee-ja and Jeong-ah's classmate and successful owner of a jjamppong shop
- Park Won-sook as Lee Young-won – age 63, Nan-hee's classmate, a former actress and advertising model
- Youn Yuh-jung as Oh Choong-nam – age 65, Nan-hee and Young-won's senior
- Joo Hyun as Lee Seong-jae – age 72, a former attorney, Hee-ja and Jeong-ah's school friend
- Kim Young-ok as Oh Ssang-boon – age 86, Nan-hee's mother
- Shin Goo as Kim Seok-gyun – age 75, Jeong-ah's husband

=== Extended ===
- Zo In-sung as Seo Yeon-ha – age 32, Park Wan's friend, Slovenia resident
- Lee Kwang-soo as Yoo Min-ho – early age 30, Hee-ja's youngest son
- Nam Neung-mi as Gi-ja – age 72
- Baek Seung-do as Yang Joo-young – Choong-nam's parental nephew
- Byeon Woo-seok as Son Jong-sik – Choong-nam's outside nephew
- Yeom Hye-ran as Soon-young – Jeong-ah's first daughter
- Kwon Hyuk as Oh Se-oh – Jeong-ah's first son-in-law
- Kang Eun-jin as Kim Ho-young – Jeong-ah's second daughter
- Han Jeong-hyun as Soo-young – Jeong-ah's third daughter
- Kim Jeong-hwan as Jang In-bong – Ssang-boon's son, Park Wan's uncle
- Cha Jong-ho as Pal-dal – Nan-hee's jjamppong shop employee
- Jeong Eui-soon as Nan-hee's jjamppong shop employee
- Ji Yi-soo as Sang-sook – Nan-hee's jjamppong shop employee
- Go Bo-gyeol as Ha-neul – Hee-ja's youngest daughter-in-law
- Lee Kwang-soo as Bong-yi – Seok-gyun's elementary school alumni
- Go Jin-myung as security colleague
- Kwak In-joon as professor Yang
- Kim Tae-hoon as professor Lee

=== Supporting ===
- Joo Boo-jin as cathedral congregation member
- Choi Jae-seop as Hee-ja's son
- Jo Seung-yeon as Hee-ja's son
- Park Sung-yeon as Hee-ja's daughter-in-law
- Park Soo-bin as Hee-ja's daughter-in-law
- Kang Moon-kyung
- Yoo Pil-ran
- Kim Pil
- Kim Hak-yim
- Jo Hye-won
- Kim Kyung-ae
- Kim Byung-choon
- Kim Hak-sun
- Ok Joo-ri
- Park Gwi-soon as taxi driver
- Noh Nam-seok
- Kwon Jae-hyun as Soon-cheol
- Lee Jeong-goo as priest
- Baek Eun-kyung
- Goo Bon-young
- Kim Yeon-hee
- Shin Shin-beom as Seok-gyun's younger brother
- Kim Mi-ryang as Seok-gyun's sister-in-law
- Kim Jeong-soo
- Jin Seok-chan
- Woo Sang-wook as young Kim Seok-gyun
- Nam Jeong-hee as elderly nursing home care helper
- Kwon Hyuk-soo as nursing home care helper
- Kim Ya-ni

=== Cameo appearances ===
- Shin Sung-woo as Han Dong-jin – early age 40, a publisher representative, an editor-in-chief
- Sung Dong-il as professor Park
- Jang Hyun-sung as Il-woo – Nan-hee's jjamppong shop regular customer
- Lee Won-jong as Jang Ho-jin – Nan-hee's father
- Song Yong-tae as Yoo Jeong-cheol – Hee-ja's husband
- Daniel Henney as Mark Smith – Hee-ja's male neighbor, photographer
- Chae Gook-hee as Seo Yeon-hee – Yeon-ha's older sister, Slovenia resident
- Ha Jae-young as Dae-cheol – Young-won's ex-husband
- Lee Soon-jae
- Kim Ji-young

== Original soundtrack ==
=== Part 1 ===
No.	Title	Artist	Length
1.	"Baby Blue"	Kevin Oh	3:15
2.	"Baby Blue" (Inst.)		3:15
Total length:			6:30

=== Part 2 ===
No.	Title	Artist	Length
1.	"Wonderful (얼마나 좋아)"	Jannabi	3:01
2.	"Beautiful"	Jannabi (잔나비)	3:01
3.	"Beautiful" (Eng Ver.)	Jannabi	3:01
Total length:			9:03

=== Part 3 ===
No.	Title	Artist	Length
1.	"Want to Be Free (바람에 머문다)"	Lyn	3:27
2.	"Want to Be Free (바람에 머문다)" (Inst.)		3:27
Total length:			6:54

=== Part 4 ===
No.	Title	Artist	Length
1.	"Don't Go (떠나가지마)"	Park Ji-min	3:16
2.	"Don't Go (떠나가지마)" (Inst.)		3:16
Total length:			6:32

=== Part 5 ===
No.	Title	Artist	Length
1.	"Go Go! Picnic"	Martin Smith	3:37
2.	"Be My Side"	Da-eun	3:09
3.	"Paso a Paso"	Edan	3:37
Total length:			10:23

== Ratings ==
Average TV viewership ratings
Ep.	Original broadcast date	Title	Average audience share		
Ep.	Original broadcast date	Title	Nielsen Korea		TNmS
Ep.	Original broadcast date	Title	Nationwide	Seoul	Nationwide
1	May 13, 2016	Sorry, I'm Not Curious About You Guys. (미안하지만, 난 당신들이 궁금하지 않아요)	4.895%	4.386%	4.0%
2	May 14, 2016	I Can Do It Alone. I Can Live Alone. (혼자 할 수 있어요. 혼자 살 수 있어요.)	4.000%	3.729%	4.1%
3	May 20, 2016	Down to the Braless Street with a Torn Jeans (노브라에 찢어진 청바지를 입고 길 위에서)	4.676%	4.875%	4.1%
4	May 21, 2016	Please, I Beg Everyone, Don't Say You Know Everything About Us. (부디, 부탁하건대 당신들, 우릴 다 안다 하지 마세요.)	3.420%	3.124%	3.0%
5	May 27, 2016	Don't Be Lonely. I'm Beside You. (외로워 마세요. 그대 곁에 내가 있어요.)	4.489%	4.648%	4.5%
6	May 28, 2016	The Way You Can Return, The Way You Can't Return (되돌아 갈 수 있는 길 되돌아 갈 수 없는 길)	3.874%	4.119%	3.5%
7	June 3, 2016	The Wind Blows. The Waves Are Hitting. (바람이 분다. 파도가 친다)	4.989%	5.888%	3.9%
8	June 4, 2016	As If Nothing Had Happened (마치 아무 일도 없었던 것처럼)	3.970%	4.053%	3.2%
9	June 10, 2016	Life Is Really Very Beautiful, Isn't It? (인생 정말 아름답지 아니한가)	5.211%	5.328%	4.5%
10	June 11, 2016	Honing the Sword of Revenge 1 (복수의 칼날을 갈며 1)	4.486%	4.550%	3.8%
11	June 17, 2016	Honing the Sword of Revenge 2 (복수의 칼날을 갈며 2)	5.467%	5.909%	4.6%
12	June 18, 2016	What I Was Aware Of, A Hundred of My Sins. What I Was Unaware Of, Tons of My Sins. (내가 알고 지은 죄, 백가지. 내가 모르고 지은 죄, 천가지 만가지)	5.294%	5.015%	4.1%
13	June 24, 2016	Like a Mother to the End, Like a Fighter to the End 1 (끝까지 엄마답게, 끝까지 투사처럼 1)	5.942%	5.744%	5.1%
14	June 25, 2016	Like a Mother to the End, Like a Fighter to the End 2 (끝까지 엄마답게, 끝까지 투사처럼 2)	5.383%	5.972%	4.4%
15	July 1, 2016	When Did We Ever Look at You This Long? (우리가 언제 당신을 이렇게 오래 바라봐 준 적 있었나?)	8.087%	9.259%	6.8%
16	July 2, 2016	Our Love Story (우리들의 러브 스토리)	6.870%	7.222%	6.0%
Average			5.066%	5.239%	4.4%
In the table above, the blue numbers represent the lowest ratings and the red numbers represent the highest ratings.; This series aired on a cable channel/pay TV which normally has a relatively smaller audience compared to free-to-air TV/public broadcasters (KBS, SBS, MBC and EBS).

== Awards and nominations ==
Year	Award	Category	Recipient	Result
2016	9th Korea Drama Awards	Best Screenplay	Noh Hee-kyung	Won
2016	tvN10 Awards	Best Actress	Go Hyun-jung	Nominated
2016	tvN10 Awards	Best Actress	Kim Hye-ja	Nominated
2016	tvN10 Awards	Best Content Award, Drama	Dear My Friends	Won
2016	tvN10 Awards	Two Star Award	Shin Goo	Nominated
2016	tvN10 Awards	Two Star Award	Youn Yuh-jung	Nominated
2016	tvN10 Awards	Best Kiss Award	Zo In-sung and Go Hyun-jung	4th place
2017	53rd Baeksang Arts Awards	Best Drama	Dear My Friends	Won
2017	53rd Baeksang Arts Awards	Best Director	Hong Jong-chan	Nominated
2017	53rd Baeksang Arts Awards	Best Screenplay	Noh Hee-kyung	Won

== Remake ==
A Chinese remake of the same name aired on Hunan TV in 2017.
