= Sky on Fire =

2016 Hong Kong-Chinese film by Ringo Lam

- Poster
- Chinese: 冲天火
- Directed by: Ringo Lam
- Screenplay by: Ringo Lam; Hiroshi Fukazawa; Shen Shi-Qi
- Story by: Ringo Lam
- Produced by: Jacqueline Liu
- Starring: Daniel Wu; Zhang Ruoyun; Zhang Jingchu; Joseph Chang; Amber Kuo
- Cinematography: Choi Man-Lung
- Edited by: David Richardson
- Music by: Dave Klotz
- Production companies: Heli Chen'guang International Media; Dongyang Hualu Baina Entertainment; Tianjin Maoyan Media; Tianbang Development; H&R Century Pictures
- Distributed by: Tianjin Maoyan Media
- Release date: 25 November 2016 (China)
- Running time: 99 minutes
- Countries: Hong Kong; China
- Languages: Mandarin; Cantonese
- Box office: CN¥31 million

Sky on Fire is a 2016 action thriller film directed by Ringo Lam and starring Daniel Wu, Zhang Ruoyun, Zhang Jingchu, Joseph Chang and Amber Kuo. A Hong Kong-Chinese co-production, it was released in China by Tianjin Maoyan Media on November 25, 2016.

== Plot ==
In this action thriller, the chief security officer at a top-secret medical facility (Daniel Wu) finds himself caught in an explosive battle when a young thief and his accomplices steal a groundbreaking curative medicine. After discovering the true origins of the medicine, the officer must decide who he can trust to prevent the cure from falling into the wrong hands, and prevent an all-out war from bringing the city to its knees.

== Cast ==
- Daniel Wu
- Zhang Ruoyun
- Zhang Jingchu
- Joseph Chang
- Amber Kuo
- Fan Guang-yao
- Wayne Lai
- Philip Keung
- Cheung Siu-fai
- Ying Batu

== Production ==
Daniel Wu hurt his nose during the filming of an action scene when it collided with Li Haitao's head. This led him to collapse after the impact. Li Haitao brought him a bag of ice and was able to re-adjust his nose.

Sky on Fire was in post-production by October 8, 2016.

== Release ==
The film was picked up by for international release by the Hong Kong–based Distribution Workshop. The film was released in China on 25 November 2016.

== Reception ==
The film has grossed CN¥31 million in China.

Edmund Lee of the South China Morning Post gave the film two stars out of five, noting that "the use of a futuristic setting that feels jarringly at odds with the touch of gritty realism prevalent in Lam's action thrillers" and that the film "made no sense" and was in "desperate need for a script doctor."

On the review aggregator website Rotten Tomatoes, 45% of 11 critics' reviews are positive, with an average rating of 4.1/10.
