= Ever Night =

Chinese television series

- Traditional Chinese: 將夜
- Simplified Chinese: 将夜
- Hanyu Pinyin: Jiāngyè
- Genre: Historical fiction; Fantasy; Adventure
- Based on: Jiang Ye by Mao Ni
- Written by: Xu Run
- Directed by: Yang Yang
- Starring: Chen Feiyu (season 1); Dylan Wang (season 2); Song Yiren
- Country of origin: China
- Original language: Mandarin
- No. of seasons: 2
- No. of episodes: 60 (season 1); 43 (season 2)

Production
- Executive producer: Yang Yang
- Production locations: Xinjiang; Guizhou
- Running time: 45 mins
- Production companies: Golden Pond Media; Mao Pian; Zeus Entertainment; Tencent Pictures; Tencent Penguin Pictures; China Reading Limited

Original release
- Network: Tencent Video
- Release: October 31, 2018 – April 20, 2020

Ever Night (Chinese: 将夜) is a 2018 Chinese television series based on the novel Jiang Ye by Mao Ni. It stars Chen Feiyu and Song Yiren. The series streamed on Tencent Video beginning October 31, 2018. The second season premiered on January 13, 2020, with Dylan Wang replaced Chen Feiyu as the lead star.

== Synopsis ==
In the ancient world lies a prophecy: Upon the arrival of Yong Ye, the world will be thrown into Chaos.

The story takes place in the Tang dynasty. When a family was unjustly massacred by a great general, only a young boy named Ning Que escapes. He manages to survive in the wilds through his wits and by defending the border of Tang and Yan as a soldier of sorts. One day, he digs a little girl he named Sang Sang, because of a mulberry shaped leaf birthmark on her foot (Sang sang means mulberry) out of a pile of corpses. Since that day, the two of them are inseparable. Ning Que joins the frontier military and eventually becomes part of the entourage of Princess Li Yu as she travels back to the capital. He manages to join the most prestigious academy in Tang where he discovers a hidden school within Tang Academy known as the Second Story. Members of this hidden school are invited disciples of Confucius (Fu Zi). He becomes the 13th disciple as well as the school’s ambassador. Becoming a disciple of Fu Zi leads him and Sang Sang to many wondrous and near death adventures.

When Sang Sang becomes ill with a mysterious illness, Ning Que takes her to a doctor, only to discover that Sang Sang is the reincarnation of Yong Ye (Eternal Night), a mysterious and powerful being that is prophesied to bring chaos. Many hostile forces are gathering around them, and people are not who they appeared to be. Is Ning Que the son of the King of Underworld, or the savior of humanity against the Eternal Night? Ning Que would defy the powers of Heaven and Earth to protect his beloved.

== Cast ==
Actor	Character	Introduction
Chen Feiyu (season 1) / Dylan Wang (season 2)	Ning Que	The sole survivor of a brutal massacre from General Lin Guangyuan's Manor. Mr. Thirteen of the Academy. He is smart and skilled in martial arts, swordsmanship, archery, and calligraphy. His body's acupoints have been blocked; for this reason, his cultivation is weak. He achieved Demon Cultivation after defeating Lotus in Demon Sect Temple.
Song Yiren / Yang Chaoyue	Sang Sang / Hao Tian/ Tian Nu	A young hand-maiden, life-long companion and later wife of Ning Que, she is caring and loyal. Her weapon is a Magical Black Umbrella. She is the long-lost daughter of Secretary Zeng of Tang. Because of the mysterious illness that befell on her, the entire world wanted her death. It was later discovered that she was Hao Tian, who was praised by the whole world, and that she made herself a mortal being just to take down Tang State and Fuzi. However, her love for Ning Que made her change.

=== Tang Empire State ===
Strongest Empire of the South. Home of the Great Cultivators and Warriors.

==== Tang Academy ====
Top Academy of the Country. Home to the mysterious and powerful Cultivators.

Actor	Character	Introduction
Adam Cheng	Fu Zi (Sage Master)	The Academy's Founder and Head Master. He is a Great Philosopher and one of the greatest cultivators in the World. A legendary expert who could even compete with Hao Tian. Along with him are 12 disciples that trained Ning Que to become the Prophesied Savior from Ever Night.
Chen Zhen	Li Manman	Senior Brother disciple of the Academy, Fu Zi's first disciple. Gentle and elegant, he is calm and composed but possesses the fastest cultivation in the world.
Dylan Kuo	Jun Mo	Second Brother disciple. He is known as a genius in cultivation. Under his cold exterior and strict appearance lies a caring side. He is skilled in Flying Sword Cultivation. He and Ye Qing had a bad encounter.
Kang Keren	Yu Lian / Lin Wu	Third Sister disciple of Fu Zi. Keeper of the Old Story Building. She is calm and a good teacher at the academy. Previously, she is Lin Wu, the last Grandmaster of Demon Sect and the Youngest to achieve Cicada Cultivation.
Jiang Shan	Fan Rui	Fourth Brother Disciple. Gentle and peaceful, he is skilled in writing runes. He designs weapons and armor with Tie Jiang.
Chen Pinyan	Song Lian	Fifth Brother Disciple. He is addicted to chess and is skilled in Dao Board.
Yan Zilun	Tie Jiang	Sixth Brother Disciple. He is honest and reliable. He is a skilled blacksmith who only makes unique or unusual weapons and armor.
Rong Zixi	Mu You	Seventh Sister Disciple. She is gentle and sweet but sometimes mischievous towards Ning Que. She is always making hand embroidery. Adept in flying needle technique. She and Jun Mo have a romantic relationship.
Liu Ben		Eighth Brother Disciple. He and Song Lian are always playing chess together,
Wang Zihao	Beigong Weiyang	Ninth Brother Disciple. He is skilled in playing the flute.
Wang Zijie	Qimen Buhuo	Tenth Brother Disciple. He is skilled in playing the zither.
Yi Yongding	Wang Chi	Eleventh Brother Disciple. Always stands on a swing and has a habit of always talking philosophy. He has excellent medical skills.
Hu Yuxuan	Chen Pipi	Twelfth Brother Disciple. He is kind and honest and becomes Ning Que's closest friend at the academy. He is a genius and innovative. He loves to cook and create new innovations. He is responsible for unlocking the blockage of Ning Que's Qihai and Xueshan Acupoints. Once a successor of Monastery of Knowledge and Obeisance along with Ye Hongyu but he escaped into the wilderness and became Fu Zi's Disciple.
Liao Yuchen	Tang Xiaotang	Tang's younger sister. She is outspoken and candid. She meets Ning Que by chance and becomes is a close friend. At the academy, she comes under the tutelage of Xu Lian; and also begins a romantic relationship with Chen Pipi.
Zhu Tao	Cao Zhifeng	A teacher at Tang Academy who is known for his strictness.
Meng En	Xie Chengyun	The third young master of the Xie family from Nanjin. He is known for being more intelligent than others since young. He and Ning Que are both friends and foes.

==== Tang kingdom ====
Actor	Character	Introduction
Leon Lai (season 1) / Bao Jianfeng (season 2)	Li Zhongyi	Emperor of Tang. He is intelligent and harbor lofty ambitions, and is able to see people and situations with a clear mind. Once a Leader and co-founder of the Ichysaurus Gang. He is also a man who values love and friendship, particularly his friendship with Chao Xiaoshu and his relationship with Xia Tian. Also a former disciple of Fu Zi and an outstanding cultivator. In the war of the World against the Child of Hades and Huangren (Desolate tribe), he stood for the Academy.
Shi Shi	Xia Tian	Empress of Tang. Xia Hou's sister, a former Saintess of the Demon Sect. She was tasked to enter the palace and seduce Li Zhongyi.
Tong Yao	Li Yu	Elder princess of Tang. A magnificent and ambitious woman. Once a close friend of Ning Que and Sang Sang. But after knowing the truth of the Child of Hades and the forthcoming of Eternal Night, she ended her relationship with them.
Su Ke	Li Peiyan	Grand Prince of Tang. Li Yu's uncle and Li Zhongyi's only brother. Ordered the death of General Lin and his entire resident, following the Grand Priest of Light's order.
Shengjia Li	Li Hunyuan	Third Prince of Tang. Proud and Ambitious, he wanted to take over the Crown.
Xu Lu Yang (season 1) / Liu Ruo Gu (season 2)	Li Hu Po	Sixth Prince of Tang. Xia Tian's son. Later the emperor of Tang.
Hu Jun	Xia Hou	A highly skilled martial artist and the leader of the four great generals of Tang. He is cunning and fearless. Was tasked by Grand Priest of Light to get rid of Hades' Son in exchange for their secrets to be kept as a member of Demon Sect.
Qin Yiming	He Mingchi	A young disciple of State Preceptor. Notorious teacher of Prince Hunyuan. According to State Preceptor, he lacks the ability to be the next State Perceptor. His real identity is that of a Xiling spy.
Andy On	Chao Xiaoshu	Chief of Yulong Sect. Second Leader of Ichysaurus Gang. A Master Swordsman, obsessed with Sword Art. Determined to Fight Liu Bai to get revenge for his brother's death. He and Li Zhongyi has a close relationship but manages to stand by his principles.
Yao Anlian	Li Qingshan	State Preceptor of Tang. The closest confidant of the Emperor.
Chin Shih-chieh	Yan Se	Grand Priest of Divine Talisman. Uses drawn writings (Calligraphy) as cultivation. Ning Que's Teacher. He was obsessed with Ning Que because of his calligraphy skill believing him to be his successor. After becoming Fuzi's 13th Disciple Yan Se simultaneously claimed Ning Que as his own disciple. He and Guangming were a disciple of Previous Xiling Shrine Leader. He is Tang's Secret Protector of the State. Because Xiling wanted Ning Que's life, he swore not to set foot on Xiling Shrine again.

=== Yan kingdom ===
Archnemesis of Tang Empire.

Actor	Character	Introduction
Wang Liao	Chong Ming	Crown Prince of Yan who was taken hostage by Tang Empire 15 years ago along with his brother. His brother were rescued. Lover of Li Yu.
Waise Lee	King of Yan	Merciless King of Yan State. Seek refuge to Xiling after their defeat by Tang Empire. Father of Chong Ming and Long Qing
Sun Zujun; Zhang Junshuo (young)	Long Qing	Second Prince of Yan. Self-proclaimed Son of Light. Proud and ambitious, he is one of the youngest cultivators in the world and is Ning Que's biggest opponent.
Huang Yilin	Lu Chenjia	Princess of Full Moon State. One of the 3 "Ch’i Maniacs"(Flower Maniac). Long Qing's lover.

=== Xiling Immortal Shrine ===
Home of the Dao Cultivists that overpowered the Continent. They strictly follow the law of Hao Tian. Home of Heaven Decree Academy, the arch-nemesis of Fu Zi Academy.

Actor	Character	Introduction
Meng Ziyi (season 1) / Liu Yijun (season 2)	Ye Hongyu	Department Head of the Xiling Justice Department. Only Disciple of Monastery of Knowledge and Obeisance. One of the 3 Ch’i Maniacs, "Taoism Maniac". She has strong faith in Taoism and obsessed with Dao Cultivation. Proud, fearless, and righteous, she is determined to perfect the Art Of Dao. She and Ning Que are enemies in beliefs but became comrades and developed romantic feelings for him after enduring dire circumstances together. Later on, she became the Grand Priestess of Justice of West-Hill Divine Palace (Xiling). She became the toughest opponent of Ning Que and Sang Sang.She likewise secretly likes Ning Que.
Ni Dahong	Wei Guangming	Grand Priest of Light Hall of Xiling. In accordance with the prophecy that the Son of Hades would bring Eternal Night. He was the mastermind behind the brutal massacre on Tang 15 years ago. When he met Sang Sang, he is enlightened by her good nature and took her as his disciple. Unbeknownst to him, Sang Sang is the reincarnation of Yong Ye that could bring Eternal Night.
Luosang Qunpei	Tian Yu	Archpriest of Revelation
Ngawang Rinchen	Cheng Lixue	Sovereign Priest of Xiling
Cheng Cao	Lou Kedi	High Templar of Xiling

=== Sect Masters (Wayfarers) ===
Actor	Character	Introduction
Wang Dong	Ye Qing	Ye Hongyu's brother. Daoist Wayfarer of Monastery of Knowledge and Obeisance. Peaceful and Calm. He and Mr. Two of the academy are Nemesis. Once fought Li Manman but easily defeated
Li Jinchuan	Qi Nian	Buddhist Monk, Master of Heavenly Pillar (XuanKong Temple).
Du Yiheng	Tang	Master of Devil's Doctrine (Demon Sect) and Chief of Huangren tribe. Tang Xiaotang's brother. Loyal and forthright, protecting the Demon Sect's Mountain Door is his sole faith.

=== Others ===
Actor	Character	Introduction
Yuan Bingyan	Mo Shanshan	Great Student of Heaven Decree Academy and a lady of Ink Pod Park. One of the three "Ch’i Maniacs" (Bookworm Maniac). Gentle and delicate, her pureness is reflected in her cultivation as well as her honest attitude toward love. She is an Expert on Talisman. She is one of the youngest Taoists in the world and has a love for calligraphy. She admires Ning Que's calligraphy skill. Ning Que's Love interest.
He Zhonghua	Liu Bai	Former leader of Renjian Pavilion. Also known as "Jian Chi", Sword Saint who is obsessed with his craft. One of the greatest cultivators to succeed Fu Zi.
Lu Yong	Xu Shi	An upright general.
Li Jun	Qing Chen	Ning Que's cultivation teacher who brought him initial enlightenment.
Gu Wenzi	Shu Tong	
Liu Peiqi	Chen Mou	Monastery Leader of Knowledge and Obeisance. Once the Fastest Cultivator to achieve Five States of Cultivation. The Powerful Cultivator after Fu Zi who achieved Limitless State. After his defeat from Ke Haoran and Fu Zi, his Morale got low, and spend his life living in the middle of the Ocean to hide from FuZi's perception. Greatest Threat of Academy. Chen Pipi's Father.
Du Yuming	Lian Sheng	Former Grandpriest of Judgment and the Former Sect Leader of Demon Sect that was possessed by Demons. He was imprisoned by Ke Hao Ran inside his Monastery.
Ai Liya	Qu Ni	Lu Chenjia's aunt. Head Priestess of Heavenly Pillar (Buddhism Sect).
Luo Guangxu	Chen Zixian	A man who once framed Xuanwei General Lin. Was the closest comrade of General Lin that he never thought to strike his back.
He Shaohong	Yan Suqing	A man who once framed General Lin Guangyuan.
Cao Weiyu	Xuanwei General/ General Lin Guangyuan	Emperor Li Zhongyi's top-ranking General and confidant. He was framed and killed by keeping the prophesied 'Child of Hades'.
Yin Zhusheng	General Ma Tuxiang	A high-ranking official in Wei city. He is dedicated to protecting his country and is a brave and decisive warrior on the battlefield. To Ning Que, he is both a friend and a father.

== Production ==
The script for Ever Night was once awarded the Gold Prize at the 网络文学双年奖, and reportedly took two years to complete. Penning the script is Xu Run, who once wrote the screenplay for notable television series like Records of Kangxi's Travel Incognito and Maritime Silk Road. The production team has also invited Yoshitaka Amano to act as the series' concept director, and John Bruno as the special effects director.

The series began filming at Xinjiang in August 2017, and wrapped up filming in February 2018. Filming took place in Xinjiang and Guizhou.

== Soundtrack ==
No.	Title	Lyrics	Music	Singers	Length
1.	"Ever Night (永夜)" (Promotional theme song)	Shi Yan	Shi Yan	Tan Weiwei
2.	"The Old Chang'an (故长安)" (Theme song)	Reno Wang, Wang Yuren	Reno Wang	Jane Zhang
3.	"Human World (红尘)"	Nick Wang	Reno Wang	Vision Wei
4.	"Song of a Desolate Man (荒人之歌)"	Mao Ni	Reno Wang	Elvis Wang
5.	"Take Your Life (取你的命)"	Mao Ni	Reno Wang	Tiger Song
6.	"Hopeless (莫望)"	Wang Haitao	Reno Wang	Liu Meilin
7.	"Willing Me (任我)"	Wang Haitao	Reno Wang	Reno Wang
8.	"Heart-shaped Universe (心形宇宙)" (Closing Theme Song)	Dai Yuedong, Yan Liyan	Dai Yuedong	Feng Timo

== Awards and nominations ==
Award	Category	Nominated work	Result	Ref.
Canada China International Film Festival	Best TV Series	Ever Night	Won	
Influence of Recreational Responsibilities Awards	Web Drama of the Year	Ever Night	Won	
Golden Bud - The Third Network Film And Television Festival	IP Adaptation of the Year	Ever Night	Won	
3rd Yinchuan Internet Film Festival	Best Screenwriter	Xu Run	Won	
26th Huading Awards	Best Actor (Historical drama)	Arthur Chen	Won	
4th China Literature Award Ceremony	Super IP New Actor	Arthur Chen	Won	
