= Zhang Ruoyun =

Chinese actor

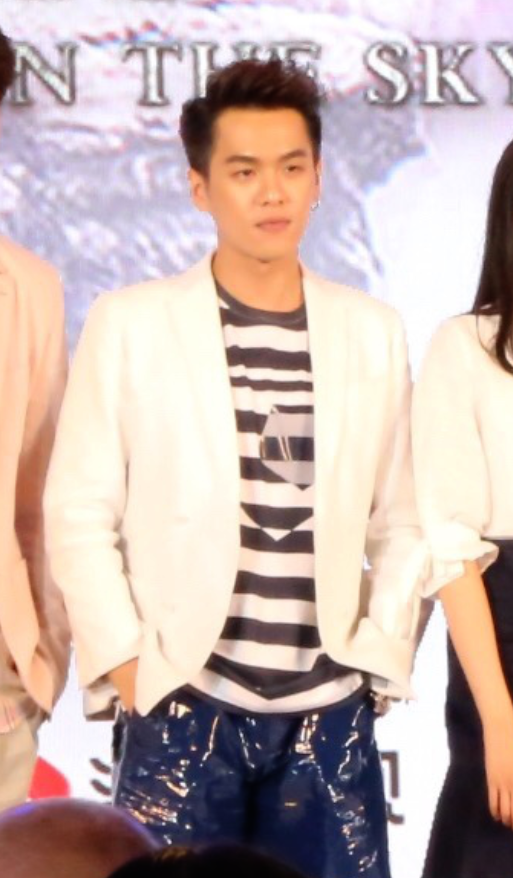
- Born: August 24, 1988 (age 38); Beijing, China
- Education: Beijing Film Academy
- Occupation: Actor
- Years active: 2010–present
- Agent: Kingswood Culture
- Spouse: Tang Yixin (m. 2019)
- Children: 1

Chinese name
- Traditional Chinese: 張若昀
- Simplified Chinese: 张若昀
Transcriptions
Standard Mandarin
- Hanyu Pinyin: Zhāng Ruò Yún

Zhang Ruoyun (simplified Chinese: 张若昀; traditional Chinese: 張若昀; pinyin: Zhāng Ruòyún, born 24 August 1988) is a Chinese actor. He is known for his leading roles in Chinese television series such as Sparrow, Medical Examiner Dr. Qin, Joy of Life, Sword Snow Stride, and Ordinary Greatness.

== Early life and education ==
Zhang was born in Beijing, on 24 August 1988, to Zhang Jian (张健), a director and producer. His grandfather is a geologist. His parents divorced when he was two. He graduated from the Beijing Film Academy in 2007.

Zhang's parents were largely absent during his childhood, and Zhang was raised by his grandparents. Later, Zhang Jian signed business contracts using his son's name without the actor's knowledge. Zhang Ruoyun eventually took his father to court over the issue.

== Career ==
=== 2004–2014: Beginnings ===
Zhang made his acting debut in 2004, acting as the younger version of the male protagonist in The Sea's Promise. He first gained attention for his roles in Snow Leopard (2010) and its companion series, Black Fox (2011). He won the Most Popular New Actor award in 2010 for his performance in Snow Leopard. Zhang took on his first lead role in war drama Sharp Sword.

In 2014, he starred in New Snow Leopard, and won the Outstanding Actor award at the China TV Drama Awards.

=== 2015–2023: Rising popularity and breakthrough ===
In 2015, Zhang starred in the web drama Wu Xin: The Monster Killer. The series was popular in both China and Taiwan, and led to increased recognition for Zhang in the region. Zhang then starred in youth romance drama Promise of Migratory Birds and fantasy dramas Novoland: The Castle in the Sky and Legend of Nine Tails Fox.

In 2016, Zhang starred in the hit espionage drama Sparrow. The popularity of the series propelled Zhang to mainstream popularity, and he won the Most Popular Actor award at the China TV Drama Awards. He then headlined the web drama Medical Examiner Dr. Qin. The series gained over 1.5 billion views on Sohu TV, and earned praise for its storyline and his performance. The same year, Zhang starred in his first film, Sky on Fire.

In 2017, he was cast in the titular role of Huo Qubing in historical drama, The Fated General. The name of the series was later changed to Desert Wind (风起大漠). In 2017, Zhang starred in Dear My Friends (Chinese TV series). Zhang ranked 94th on Forbes China Celebrity 100 list.

In 2017–2018, Zhang took on the dual roles of Vladimir and Vershinin in the stage production Three Sisters & Waiting for Godot, a contemporary experimental theatrical play directed by Lin Zhaohua.

In 2018, Zhang starred in the romantic comedy drama The Evolution of Our Love.

In 2019, Zhang starred in the spy drama Awakening of Insects. This series received widespread acclaim and popularity, and he was nominated for the Audience's Choice for Actor at the 30th China TV Golden Eagle Award. He then starred as the male lead in historical epic Joy of Life based on the novel Qing Yu Nian by Mao Ni. Joy of Life received positive reviews and was a hit. For his outstanding performance in Joy of Life, Zhang earned his nomination for the Magnolia Award for Best Actor in a Television Series.

In 2020, Zhang was cast in the legal drama Perfect Evidence, and the film Escape from the 21st Century, which was only screened in 2024. During 2020, he teamed up once again with Joy of Life screenwriter Wang Juan, this time for the wuxia drama Sword Snow Stride. The series premiered on December 15, 2021, on the CCTV Drama Channel and simultaneously aired on Tencent Video. By January 20, 2022, Sword Snow Stride had already amassed a viewership of over 6 billion on Tencent. Zhang ranked 37th on Forbes China Celebrity 100 list.

In 2022, Zhang starred as the male lead in the urban police drama Ordinary Greatness. This series received widespread acclaim.

In 2023, Zhang took on the lead role of Shuai Jiamo, a mathematical genius with Asperger's syndrome, in Under The Microscope, a production adapted from Ma Boyong's historical book "Under the Microscope of the Ming Dynasty". That same year, Zhang starred as the lead, Lei Ming, in the drama The Hope, which tells the story of a passionate teacher helping students rediscover their purpose. After the airing of the series finale in January 2024, Zhang published a heartfelt reflection on his Weibo account，where he recalled his emotional journey playing the role of Lei Ming and shared his unique insights into this character.

=== 2024–present: Continued success and mainstream recognition ===
Before 2024, Zhang was already recognized for his versatility and impressive performances across a wide range of characters. His breakthrough came in 2019 with the immensely popular series Joy of Life, where his portrayal of Fan Xian received critical acclaim. His success continued with every subsequent drama, spanning both historical and modern settings, where he demonstrated a remarkable ability to bring characters to life.

After a four-year hiatus since Joy of Life, filming for Joy of Life 2, in which Zhang reprised his role as the lead character Fan Xian, commenced in May 2023. When the TV series aired a year later, in May 2024, it achieved remarkable success, setting several records on Tencent Video, including the highest-ever popularity score. Joy of Life 2 also became the most-watched drama from mainland China on Disney+, and it gained considerable attention on platforms like YouTube and Viki, drawing two to three times the viewership of other highly regarded Chinese dramas. For his outstanding performance in Joy of Life 2, Zhang earned his second nomination for the Magnolia Award for Best Actor in a Television Series.

In 2024, Zhang was cast as the male lead, Gao Feng, in the suspense TV series Light of Dawn. In the Summer of 2024, the film Escape from the 21st Century was released. That same year, for his outstanding performance in Ordinary Greatness, Zhang earned his nomination for China TV Golden Eagle Award for Best Actor.

== Personal life ==
Zhang and actress Tang Yixin revealed their relationship through Weibo on August 2, 2017. They got married in Ireland on June 27, 2019, after dating for close to 9 years. Their daughter was born in May 2020.

== Filmography ==
=== Film ===
Year	English title	Chinese title	Role	Notes/Ref.
2016	Sky on Fire	沖天火	Pan Ziwen	
2018	Nuts	奇葩朵朵	Huang Jian	
2020	Onward	½的魔法	Barley	Chinese dub
2021	1921	1921	Liu Shao Qi	
2024	Escape from the 21st Century	从21世纪安全撤离	Wang Zha	
2024	Mufasa: The Lion King	狮子王：木法沙传奇	Mufasa	Chinese dub
2025	The Lychee Road	长安的荔枝	Du Fu	
2026	Make Zhonghe Great Again	年会不能停2！	Liu Ben	

=== Television series ===
Year	English title	Chinese title	Role	Network	Notes/Ref.
2004	The Sea's Promise	海的誓言	young Ouyang Zheng	Youku	
2010	Snow Leopard	雪豹	Liu Zhihui	Hunan Channel	
2011	Barber	理发师	Zhao Jing	Hebei TV	
2011	Black Fox	黑狐	Fang Tianyi	Sichuan TV	
2012	Blood Rose	血色玫瑰之女子特遣队	Zhou Lichan	Sichuan TV	Guest appearance
2013	Flashing Swords	雳剑	Yan Songshen	Yunnan TV, Heilongjiang TV	
2013	Next Life I Will Still Marry You	下辈子还嫁给你	Fu Nianwen	Shandong TV	
2013	The Wind	风影	Fang Tianyi	Zhejiang TV	Guest appearance
2013	Love Song	恋歌	Lin Heng	Sichuan TV	
2014	New Snow Leopard	雪豹坚强岁月	Zhou Weiguo	Anhui TV, Zhejiang TV	
2014	Light and Shadow	光影	Luo Tianqiang	Zhejiang TV	
2015	Wu Xin: The Monster Killer	无心法师	Zhang Xianzong	Sohu TV	
2015	Intouchable	男神执事团	Jie		
2016	Legend of Nine Tails Fox	青丘狐传说	Liu Zigu	Hunan TV	
2016	Promise of Migratory Birds	十五年等待候鸟	Pei Xiangxuan	Hunan TV	
2016	Novoland: The Castle in the Sky	九州天空城	Feng Tianyi	Jiangsu TV	
2016	Sparrow	麻雀	Tang Shanhai	Hunan TV	
2016	Medical Examiner Dr. Qin	法医秦明	Qin Ming	Sohu TV	
2016	Hei Hu Zhi Feng Ying	黑狐之风影	Fang Tianyi	Chongqing TV	Guest appearance
2017	Dear My Friends	亲爱的她们	He Anning	Hunan TV	
2018	The Evolution of Our Love	爱情进化论	Lu Fei	Dragon TV, Zhejiang TV	
2019	Hurricane	暴风骤雨	Zhao Yulin	Jiangsu Channel	
2019	Awakening of Insects	惊蛰	Chen Shan	Hunan TV	
2019	Joy of Life	庆余年	Fan Xian	iQiyi, Tencent	
2021	My Heroic Husband	赘婿	Jiang Haochen	Tencent	Cameo
2021	Sword Snow Stride	雪中悍刀行	Xu Fengnian	Tencent	
2022	Ordinary Greatness	警察荣誉	Li Dawei	iQiyi	
2023	Under The Microscope	显微镜下的大明之丝绢案	Shuai Jiamo	iQiyi	
2023	The Hope	鸣龙少年	Lei Ming	Youku	
2024	Judge Dee's Mystery	大唐狄公案	Diao Xiaoguan	Youku	Guest appearance
2024	Joy of Life 2	庆余年 第二季	Fan Xian	Tencent, Disney+	
2026	Light of Dawn	人之初	Gao Feng	Tencent	
TBA	Perfect Evidence	完美证据	Si Tujun		
TBA		千里江山图	Chen Qianli		
TBA	Desert Wind/The Fated General	风起大漠	Huo Qubing		

=== Theatre ===
Year	English title	Chinese title	Role	Notes
2017–2018	Three Sisters & Waiting for Godot	三姐妹·等待戈多	Vladimir, Vershinin	Director: Lin Zhaohua
2018	White Rabbit, Red Rabbit	白兔子，红兔子		

=== Variety show ===
Year	English title	Chinese title	Role	Notes/Ref.
2017	Divas Hit the Road	花儿与少年第三季	Cast member	Season 3
2016	Who's the Murderer S1	明星大侦探第一季	Cast member	ep5. The Missing Groom (消失的新郎) ep8.All Because of Beauty (都是漂亮惹的祸)
2017	Who's the Murderer S3	明星大侦探第三季	Cast member	ep0.Detectives' Dignity (先导) ep1.Hotel Horrors I (酒店惊魂I) ep2.Hotel Horrors II (酒店惊魂II)
2018	Who's the Murderer S4	明星大侦探第四季	Cast member	ep0.Detectives' Society (先导) ep1.Escape the Nameless Island I (逃出无名岛I) ep2.Escape the Nameless Island II (逃出无名岛II) ep5.Heaven Apartments (天堂公寓) ep11.Number One Player I (头号玩家I) ep12.Number One Player II (头号玩家II)
2019	Who's the Murderer S5	明星大侦探第五季	Cast member	ep0. The Return of the Famous Detectives (先导) ep1.Pianist in the Sea I (海上钢琴师I) ep2.Pianist in the Sea II (海上钢琴师II) ep11.Murder on the Slow Northern Train I (北方慢车迷案I) ep12.Murder on the Slow Northern Train II-III (北方慢车迷案II-III)
2020	Who's the Murderer S6	明星大侦探第六季	Cast member	ep1.Midnight Hotel I (夜半酒店I) ep2.Midnight Hotel II (夜半酒店II) ep3.New Four Talents (新四大才子)
2022	Who's the Murderer S7	大侦探7	Regular cast member	All episodes
2023	Who's the Murderer S8	大侦探8	Regular cast member	All episodes
2024	Who's the Murderer S9	大侦探9	Regular cast member	All episodes
2025	Detectives' Holiday	明侦探的假期	Regular cast member	All epidosdes
2025	Who's the Murderer S10	大侦探 拾光季	Regular cast member	All episodes
2026	Who's the Murderer S11	明星大侦探第十一季	Cast member	ep1.Baby Project I (宝贝计划I) ep2.Baby Project II (宝贝计划II) ep12.The Dusk Files: Dream Cinema (夕晖档案之好梦影院)

== Discography ==
=== Soundtrack appearances ===
Year	English title	Chinese title	Album	Notes
2011	"A Strong Person"	坚强的人	Black Fox OST	
2013	"Waking Up"	醒来	Love Song OST	
2015	"The Longest Journey"	最长的旅途	Wu Xin: The Monster Killer OST	
2016	"The Promise of Lateness"	迟到的誓言	Promise of Migratory Birds OST	
2016	"Stray"	迷途	Sparrow OST	
2016	"Eternal"	不滅	Medical Examiner Dr. Qin OST	Lyrics by Zhang Ruoyun
2018	"All Right"	—N/a	The Evolution of Our Love OST	
2021	"Walking in the Snow"	雪中行	Sword Snow Stride OST	

== Accolades ==
=== Awards and nominations ===
Year	Award	Category	Nominated work	Result	Ref.
2012	2nd LeTV Entertainment Awards	Best Newcomer (TV)	—N/a	Won	
2014	6th China TV Drama Awards	Excellent Actor Award	New Snow Leopard	Won	
2016	10th Tencent Video Star Awards	Influential Television Actor of the Year	—N/a	Won	
2016	8th China TV Drama Awards	Popular Actor Award	Sparrow	Won	
2017	14th Esquire Man At His Best Awards	Most Talked About Actor	—N/a	Won	
2019	Sohu Fashion Awards	Drama Star of the Year	—N/a	Won	
2019	Golden Bud - The Fourth Network Film And Television Festival	Actor of the Year	Awakening of Insects, Joy of Life	Won	
2019	Tencent Video All Star Awards	Quality Actor of the Year	Joy of Life	Won	
2019	Beijing News Weekly	Person of the Year	—N/a	Won	
2020	Yuewen Original Literature Summit	Popular Actor of the Year	—N/a	Won	
2020	Yuewen Original Literature Summit	Heartthrob Actor	—N/a	Won	
2020	12th China TV Drama Awards	Quality Actor of the Year	Joy of Life	Won	
2020	26th **Shanghai Television Festival**	**Best Actor**	Joy of Life	Nominated	
2020	7th The Actors of China Award Ceremony	Best Actor (Web series)	—N/a	Won	
2020	30th **China TV Golden Eagle Award**	Audience's Choice for Actor	—N/a	Nominated	
2021
2021	GQ Men of the Year	Annual Role Model Power	—N/a	Won	
2022
2022	GQ Men of the Year	Annual Role Model Power	—N/a	Won	
2022	Weibo TV & Internet Video Summit	Quality Actor of the Year	—N/a	Won	
2022	IQIYI Scream Night	【Drama Category】Actor of the Year	—N/a	Won	
2023	1st CMG Annual Chinese TV Drama Ceremony	Popular Actor of the Year	Ordinary Greatness	Won	
2023	Weibo TV & Internet Video Summit	Quality Actor of the Year	—N/a	Won	
2023	IQIYI Scream Night	【Drama Category】Actor of the Year	—N/a	Won	
2023	Tencent Video All Star Awards	VIP Star of the Year	—N/a	Won	
2023	GQ Men of the Year	Annual Role Model Power	—N/a	Won	
2024
2024	32nd **China TV Golden Eagle Award**	Best Actor	Ordinary Greatness	Nominated	
2024	Tencent Video All Star Awards	VIP Star of the Year	—N/a	Won	
2024	Tencent Video All Star Awards	Most Influential Artist of the Year	—N/a	Won	
2025
2025	3rd CMG Annual Chinese TV Drama Ceremony	Most Appealing Actor of the Year	Joy of Life 2	Won	
2025	Yuewen Global IP Awards	Actor of the Year	—N/a	Won	
2025	China Quality Television Drama Ceremony	Star of Outstanding Quality	—N/a	Won	
2025	Weibo Movie Awards Ceremony	Most Appealing Actor of the Year	—N/a	Won	
2025	30th **Shanghai Television Festival**	**Best Actor**	Joy of Life 2	Nominated	
2025	30th **Shanghai Television Festival**	Overseas Promotion Ambassador for Chinese TV Programme	—N/a	Won	

Note: the bolded ones are among the three major awards.

=== Forbes China Celebrity 100 ===
Year	Rank	Ref.
2017	94th	
2020	32nd	
