= Goldbuster =

- Film poster
- Traditional Chinese: 妖鈴鈴
- Simplified Chinese: 妖铃铃
- Hanyu Pinyin: Yāolínglíng
- Directed by: Sandra Ng
- Written by: Wong Yee-Hing; Zha Muchun; Zhou Haiyun
- Produced by: Peter Chan
- Starring: Sandra Ng; Francis Ng; Alex Fong; Shen Teng; Zhang Yi; Jiang Yilei; Yue Yunpeng
- Cinematography: Jake Pollock
- Edited by: Derek Hui
- Music by: Raymond Wong; Florian Linckus; Christof Unterberger; Ryan Thomas
- Production company: Beijing Fun Age Pictures
- Distributed by: Clover Films; Golden Village Pictures; Well Go USA Entertainment
- Release date: 29 December 2017 (China)
- Running time: 89 minutes
- Country: China
- Languages: Mandarin; Cantonese
- Box office: >¥300 million

Goldbuster (Chinese: 妖铃铃) is a 2017 Chinese comedy film produced by Peter Chan and directed by Sandra Ng. The film stars Sandra Ng, Francis Ng, Alex Fong, Shen Teng, Zhang Yi, Jiang Yilei, and Yue Yunpeng. The film picks up the stories between a real estate owner and the nail-house holders. The film premiered in China on 29 December 2017.

== Cast ==
- Sandra Ng as Sister Ling
- Francis Ng as Ah Ming, a faded lowbrow.
- Alex Fong as Ah Ren, a faded lowbrow.
- Shen Teng as Xu Dafu, a real estate owner.
- Zhang Yi as Wang Baojian
- Jiang Yilei as Li Juhua, an inventor.
- Yue Yunpeng as Xu Tianyu, Xu Dafu's son.
- Pan Binlong as Jin San, husband of Li Juhua.
- Li Yihang as Ji Ding
- Jiao Junyan as Ah Ping, a network host.
- Ah Runa as Zhao Dianpao
- Xu Juncong as Zhang Yonggan
- Zhao Yingjun
- Ma Sichun

== Soundtrack ==
No.	Title	Lyrics	Music	Singer(s)	Length
1.	"Tianlingling (天灵灵)" (Interlude)	Zhao Yingjun	Zhao Yingjun	Ma Li
2.	"What a Ghost (什么鬼)" (Interlude)	Thinty Xiao	Xueran Chen	Sandra Ng/ Papi/ Xiong Ziqi
3.	"Friend (朋友)" (Promotion song)	Zhang Yi	Hiroaki Serizawa	Celebrities

== Production ==
The film is Sandra Ng's directorial debut.

This film was shot mostly on location in Panyu District of Guangzhou, Guangdong, China.

== Release ==
Goldbuster was released on 29 December 2017 in China, and on 5 January 2018 in the United States.

== Reception ==
Douban gave the film 4.3 out of 10.

== Box office ==
Goldbuster earned a total of 300 million yuan in its first 4 days of release.
