= Joy of Life (TV series) =

2019 Chinese television series

- Also known as: Celebrating an Affluent Year
- Traditional Chinese: 慶餘年
- Simplified Chinese: 庆余年
- Hanyu Pinyin: Qìng Yúnián
- Genre: Historical fiction; Political; Romance
- Based on: Qing Yu Nian by Mao Ni
- Written by: Wang Juan
- Directed by: Sun Hao
- Starring: Zhang Ruoyun; Li Qin; Chen Daoming
- Opening theme: "One Life One Thought" by Li Jian
- Ending theme: "Remaining Years" by Xiao Zhan
- Country of origin: China
- Original language: Mandarin
- No. of seasons: 2
- No. of episodes: 82

Production
- Executive producer: Chen Yingjie
- Production locations: Hengdian World Studios; Duyun
- Editor: Zhang Jia
- Camera setup: Multiple-camera setup
- Running time: 40-45 minutes
- Production companies: Tencent Pictures; New Classics Media; China Literature; Azure Media Corporation; Huayu Shidai; Hainan Television

Original release
- Network: Tencent Video; iQiyi
- Release: November 26, 2019 – present

Joy of Life (Chinese: 庆余年; pinyin: Qìng Yúnián), also known as Thankful for the Remaining Years, is a 2019 Chinese television series that is based on the novel Qing Yunian (庆余年) by Mao Ni. It stars Zhang Ruoyun, Li Qin and Chen Daoming. The series premiered on Tencent Video and iQiyi on November 26, 2019. It garnered high viewership and mostly positive reviews, and won two awards at the Shanghai Television Festival, including Best Adapted Screenplay. Series 1 and 2 are currently available via Rakuten Viki. Series 3 has not yet been filmed but was announced to air in 2026.

== Plot ==
Season 1

Fan Xian is born in the ancient empire of Southern Qing with memories of the 21st century. He is raised by his grandmother in the rural town, Danzhou as the illegitimate son of the Minister of Finance. His mother, Ye Qingmei was once a celebrated inventor who founded the Inspection and Control Bureau, the country's spy network and the Royal Treasury but was killed shortly after her son was born. Fan Xian has been protected since birth by a blind martial arts expert, Wu Zhu, his mother's bodyguard. He learns martial arts and the art of poison as a child, also assisted by his knowledge from the 21st century. After an assassination attempt, he decides to venture into the capital to find out more about his mysterious mother and why anyone would want to kill him, as he perceives himself to be an unimportant person. He also wants to know why he has memories of an obviously different era. In the capital, he accidentally meets Lin Wan'er, the sickly, illegitimate daughter of the Princess Royal and falls in love with her. Unbeknownst to him, she is the woman the Emperor chose for him to marry so that he could take over the Royal Treasury, an institute Fan Xian's mother established in the palace and currently handled by the Princess Royal. In the capital, however, he gets entangled in the relationship between the Emperor and the two Princes, as well as the Inspection and Control Bureau, leading to him questioning his whole identity and motivating him to find his true life goals, abandoning his original intention to just "enjoy life". In the 46th (and final) episode of season 1 Fan Xian, choosing loyalty to friends and family over loyalty to the state, is apparently killed.

Season 2

In Season 2, Fan Xian returns to the capital, having faked his own death. Because he deceived the emperor, he is due to be punished but manages to twist his story cleverly so he escapes the death penalty. He gets further entangled in court politics as the emperor puts even more official responsibilities on his shoulders and the two princes continue to scheme against him and each other. Fan Xian decides to do away with evil and corrupt officials and sets a plan in motion to be able to realize his mother's dream of a fair society. During the season the emperor tells Fan Xian that he is his son.

Season3

The third season will center around Fan Xian finding the secret of the Temple and it will reveal how he is able to have 21st century memories.

== Cast ==
=== Main ===
Actor	Character	Introduction
Zhang Ruoyun Han Haolin as young Fan Xian	Fan Xian / Fan Shen	Fan Jian's adopted son; the son of the emperor and Ye Qingmei. He is quite skilled in martial arts and has memories from the 21st Century which allow him to use that knowledge to his advantage. Lin Wan'er's love interest and fiancé.
Li Qin	Lin Wan'er	Commandery Princess. The illegitimate daughter of Lin Ruofu and the Elder Princess. Fan Xian's love interest and fiancée. She suffers from tuberculosis, and later Fan Xian treats her disease.
Chen Daoming	Emperor of Qing	The ruler of Southern Qing (unnamed as the author thought to be unnecessary; named Li Yunqian in the extra stories)

=== Supporting ===
==== Southern Qing Empire ====
===== Imperial palace =====
Actor	Character	Introduction
Zheng Yuzhi	Empress Dowager	Empress Dowager of Qing. Mother of the Emperor, Elder Princess Li Yunrui, and Prince of Jing. Eunuch Hong attends to her.
Yuan Quan	Ye Qingmei	Fan Xian's birth mother, and former lover of the emperor. Her inventions made the royal family wealthy, which created the Royal Treasury and also founded the Inspection and Control Bureau.
Li Xiaoran	Li Yunrui	Eldest Princess (equivalent to the west's Princess Royal) and Lin Wan'er's mother. Younger sister of the Emperor although they are not blood related. She controls the Royal Treasury which will be passed on to whoever marries Lin Wan'er.
Lin Jing	Noble Consort Shu	The mother of the second prince.
Deng Tongtian	Concubine Yi	Liu Ruyu's cousin; the mother of the third prince (he is really the fourth prince by birth order but the Crown Prince is excluded from the ranking).
Qiao Hong	Talented Lady Ning	The mother of the eldest prince. A native of Dongyi (Japan), her foreign blood bars her son from the succession.
Liu Duan Duan	Li Chengze	The second prince of Qing. Born by Noble Consort Shu. He appears laidback but underneath he is calculating and hides his true nature.
Zhang Haowei	Li Chengqian	Crown Prince of Qing and the third eldest prince of Qing by birth order.
Liu Runnan	Li Hongcheng	Son of the Prince of Jing, who is the full younger brother of the Qing Emperor. Close friend and cousin of the second prince.
Fu Xinbo	Li Chenru	The first prince of Qing, who guards the borders. Appears in second season for the first time.
Guo Zifan	Li Chengping	The third prince of Qing

===== Imperial court =====
Actor	Character	Introduction
Yu Yang	Lin Ruofu	Prime Minister of Qing. Father of Lin Wan'er', Lin Dabao, and Lin Gong.
Gao Shuguang	Fan Jian	Count of Sinan and formerly Assistant Minister of Revenue, now Minister of Revenue. Fan Ruoruo and Fan Sizhe's biological father. Fan Xian's adoptive father.
Chang Cheng	Guo Youzhi	Minister of Rites. Father of Guo Baokun.
Li Jianyi	Mei Zhili	Local Prefect of the Capital City. He acts as the judge in civil court. Assassinated en route to return to hometown for retirement.
Li Zifeng	Yan Xiaoyi	Commander of the Palace Guards. The only 9th level archery martial artist in existence according to Wuzhu. He was saved and promoted from a hunter by Eldest Princess Yunrui, and he is loyal to her.
Cui Peng	Gong Dian	Vice-Commander of the Palace Guards and the emperor's bodyguard. 8th level martial artist.
Cui Zhigang	Eunuch Hou	The emperor's head eunuch
Du Yuming	Eunuch Hong Sixiang	Empress Dowager's head eunuch. Reputed to be one of the four martial grandmasters.
Zhao Zhen Ting	Xie Bi'an	2nd Prince's Bodyguard. A martial artist who is highly skilled in using swords.
Wang Cheng Yang	Young Eunuch Hong	A young eunuch who becomes Fan Xian's supporter in Season 2 due to his investigation into corrupt politicians.

===== Inspection and Control Bureau =====
Actor	Character	Introduction
Wu Gang	Chen Pingping	Ruthless and astute head of the government's Inspection and Control Bureau, an investigative agency that monitors other government branches. He is considered to be the second most powerful person in Southern Qing.
Hai Yitian	Zhu Ge	Head of the first bureau of the Inspection and Control Bureau, the branch in charge of the capital city.
Liu Hua	Fei Jie	Head of the third bureau of the Inspection and Control Bureau, the branch specializing in poison and gadgets. Fan Xian's first teacher. Master of poisons and medicine.
Dong Jingchuan	Senior Leng	Acting head of the third bureau of the Inspection and Control Bureau.
Li Qiang	Yan Ruohai	Head of the fourth bureau of the Inspection and Control Bureau, the branch in charge of everything outside the capital city, including foreign espionage.
	Hei Qi	Head of the fifth bureau of the Inspection and Control Bureau, the armed division known as the Black Knights.
Wang Yifu (Season 1); Liu Yu Qiao (Season 2)	Ying Zi (Shadow)	Head of the sixth bureau of the Inspection and Control Bureau, the assassination branch. Known as Lord Shadow. He appears mysterious and no one has ever seen his face under his mask and hood. He is highly skilled in martial arts and according to Chen Pingping, he can wipe out an army by himself.
Jiang Yang	Xuan Jiu	Head of the eighth bureau of the Inspection and Control Bureau, the branch in charge of publication of books.
Tian Yu	Wang Qinian	A notary of the first bureau. Loves money and is afraid of his wife. He later becomes Fan Xian's faithful servant.
Xiao Zhan (Season 1); Wu Xingjian (Season 2)	Yan Bingyun	Yan Ruohai's son. He is dispatched as the spymaster in Northern Qi. Stands for peace and order in Northern Qi.

===== Fan's family and household =====
Actor	Character	Introduction
Cao Cuifen		Fan Jian's mother. Fan Xian's (adoptive) grandmother. Fan Ruoruo and Fan Sizhe's biological grandmother. She lives in Danzhou and looked after Fan Xian when he was born.
Zhao Ke	Liu Ruyu	Fan Jian's second wife and Fan Sizhe's mother
Song Yi	Fan Ruoruo	Fan Jian's daughter, Fan Xian's adoptive younger sister, and Fan Sizhe's elder sister. She is known to be the most talented girl in the capital.
Guo Qilin	Fan Sizhe	Fan Jian's son with Liu Ruyu. Is very focused on money.
Wang Yang	Teng Zijing	Originally a member of the fourth bureau of the control department, later Fan Xian's close friend and bodyguard. 7th level martial artist.
Han Yuanqi		Teng Zijing's son.

===== Others =====
Actor	Character	Introduction
Tong Mengshi	Wuzhu	A blind martial arts grandmaster and loyal servant of Ye Qingmei. He serves Fan Xian under orders from his mother. Only a few people know of his existence.
Kang Jie	Lin Gong	Lin Ruofu's second son and Lin Wan'er's older brother, he dislikes Fan Xian.
Dong Kefei	Lin Dabao	Lin Ruofu's eldest son. He suffered an illness a young age which impacted his mental development. He and Fan Xian get along well.
Jia Jinghui	Guo Baokun	Guo Youzhi's son. Friend of the Crown Prince.
Xiao Haoran	He Zongwei	An orator/lawyer who often argues cases in favour of the aristocrats, much to the disgust of the commoners.
Han Jiunuo (Season 1, 3); Gina Jin (Season 2)	Ye Ling'er	Lin Wan'er's friend and daughter of the head of the Garrison
Li Shen	Gao Da	A guard escort accompanying Fan Xian to Northern Qi.
	Si Gujian	One of four martial arts grandmasters. Resides in Dongyi. His disciples are never without a sword.
	Yun Zhilan	Si Gujian's eldest disciple.

==== Northern Qi Empire ====
Actor	Character	Introduction
Liang Aiqi		Empress Dowager of Northern Qi.
Liu Meitong	Zhan Doudou	Emperor of Northern Qi.
Li Chun	Si Lili	A spy from Northern Qi who infiltrates Southern Qing. Noble Consort of Northern Qi. Granddaughter of a Qing prince (presumably an uncle of the Qing Emperor). She later develops feelings for Fan Xian.
Yu Xiaowei	Shen Zhong	Commander of the Jinyiwei Guards. He is highly skilled in martial arts and appears cunning and sadistic.
Xin Zhilei	Haitang Duoduo	Blessed Maiden of Northern Qi. 9th level martial artists and youngest disciple of Ku He.
Yu Rongguang	Xiao En	Zhuang Mohan's younger brother. Former Northern Qi spymaster. Is captured and imprisoned by the Inspection and Control Bureau more than a decade before the start of the story.
Sun Yimu	Lang Tao	Eldest Disciple of Northern Qi's grandmaster Ku He. One of the most powerful martial artists in the world.
He Ziming	Shang Shan Hu	Northern Qi general. God-son of Xiao En. It is not known whether his surname is Shang or Shangshan.
Guo Jia Nuo	He Daoren	Northern Qi swordmaster, disciple of Si GuJian and 9th level martial artist.
	Ku He	Uncle of the Emperor of Northern Qi. One of four martial arts grandmasters. Wants Xiao En dead.
	Cheng Jushu	Northern Qi 8th level martial artist.

== Production ==
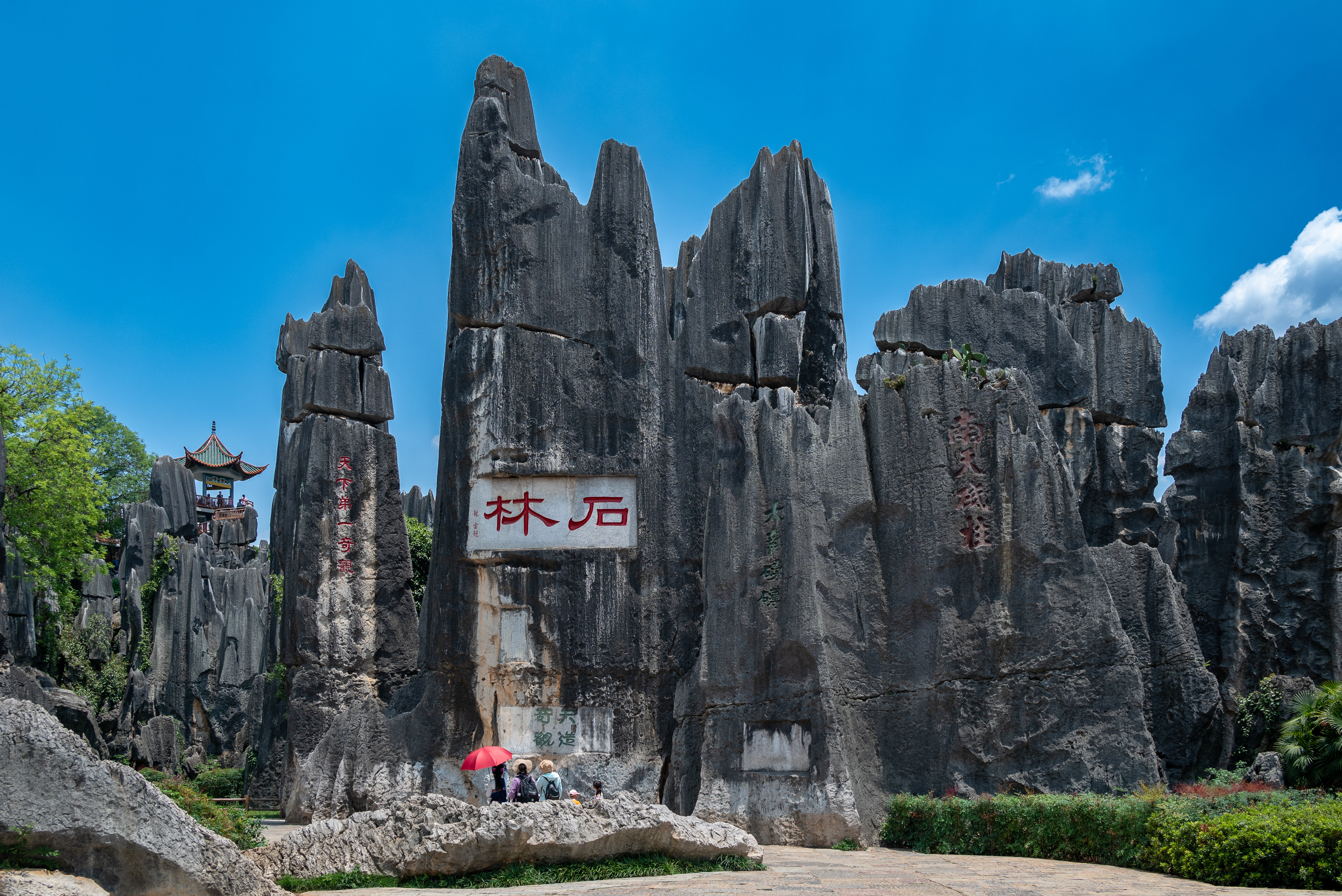
The Stone Forest was used as one of the filming locations

Principal photography commenced in January 2018 and the entire filming wrapped up in August 2018. A second season was announced in 2020, while Tencent Pictures, Xinli Media and China Reading Film and Television later announced the project would go live in the fourth quarter of 2021. In October 2021, Disney announced that they would be involved in producing the second season of Joy of Life with New Classics Media, and referred to it as a "prequel" although the second season actually follows directly on from the first.

The second season premiered in 2024. Most of the original cast returned, but some key roles such as Yan Bingyun and Ye Ling'er were re-cast. In total, three seasons are planned.

The third season was announced to air in 2026, where most of the main cast will reappear, except for the actress portraying Ye Ling'er, as the production team decided to bring back the original actress from season 1. The production budget was increased to build an original set for the temple, which will have mirrored surfaces. Certain scenes will be shot using VR long takes. Zhang Ruoyun has undertaken special martial arts training for a new double sword fighting style. The third season will reportedly have 36 episodes.

=== Filming locations ===
The first series was shot at several locations, including Hengdian World Studios, Duyun Qin and Han Studio City, the Stone Forest in Yunnan, and other scenic locations in Yunnan province. The second season was partially filmed at Xiangyang.

== Soundtrack ==
=== Season 1 ===
Mainland China

No.	Title	Lyrics	Music	Singers	Length
1.	"One Life One Thought (一念一生)" (Opening theme song)	Li Jian	Li Jian	Li Jian	04:36
2.	"Remaining Years (余年)" (Ending theme song)	Lu Jingya	Chen Shimei	Xiao Zhan	04:25

Hong Kong

No.	Title	Lyrics	Music	Singers	Length
1.	"The Coldest Day (最冷的一天)" (Opening theme song)	Sandy Chang	Alan Cheung	Brian Tse	03:29

Taiwan

No.	Title	Lyrics	Music	Singers	Length
1.	"Anything Goes (皆可)" (Opening theme song)	Xiaoxie Lan (藍小邪)	Terence Lam	Hebe Tien	04:26
2.	"One, after Another (一一)" (Ending theme song)	Radio Mars (火星電台)	Radio Mars (火星電台)	Hebe Tien	04:10

=== Season 2 ===
No.	Title	Lyrics	Music	Singers	Length
1.	"Let Me Pass Through (借过一下)" (Ending theme song)	Tang Tian (唐恬)	Zhou Yi Li (周以力)	Zhou Shen	04:54
2.	"In My Lifetime (有生之年)"	Li Jian	Li Jian	Li Jian	5:00
3.	"Aiya (哎呀)" (promotional song)	Liang Long (梁龙)	Liang Long	Liang Long, Liu Duan Duan, Zhang Hao Wei & Guo Zi Fan	2:59

== Reception ==
The drama received positive reviews for its skillful adaptation of the original novel, comedic elements and logical story flow. It also received praise for its cinematography, acting performance, special effects and action scenes; as well as its tight plot and interesting storyline. It achieved more than 13 billion combined views on Tencent Video and iQiyi, and received 8 out of 10 stars on Douban. International streaming site Viki users gave it a 9.5 rating out of 10 with over 5000 reviews in 2021.

When Joy of Life 2 aired in May 2024, it achieved remarkable success, setting several records on Tencent Video, including the highest-ever popularity score. The series also became the most-watched drama from mainland China on Disney+, and it gained considerable attention on platforms like YouTube and Viki, drawing two to three times the viewership of other highly regarded Chinese dramas.

== Awards and nominations ==
Award	Category	Nominee	Results	Ref.
Film and TV Role Model 2019 Ranking	Popular Web Series	Joy of Life	Won	
China Literature Award Ceremony	IP Adapted Drama of the Year	Joy of Life	Won	
26th Shanghai Television Festival	Best Television Series	Joy of Life	Nominated	
26th Shanghai Television Festival	Best Director	Sun Hao	Nominated	
26th Shanghai Television Festival	Best Adapted Screenplay	Wang Juan	Won	
26th Shanghai Television Festival	Best Actor	Zhang Ruoyun	Nominated	
26th Shanghai Television Festival	Best Supporting Actor	Chen Daoming	Nominated	
26th Shanghai Television Festival	Best Supporting Actor	Tian Yu	Won	

== International broadcast ==
Season 1

Region	Network	Dates	Notes
Hong Kong, Macau	TVB Jade	2 March 2020 - 18 April 2020 (Monday to Friday at 9:30 PM) & 21 March (Saturday at 8:30 PM back to back episodes)	Dubbed with Cantonese
Malaysia	8TV	15 May 2020 - (Monday to Friday at 8:30 PM)	Original
Vietnam	HTV7	18 November 2020 - (Monday to Friday at 5:45 PM)	Dubbed with Vietnamese
Vietnam	Hanoi Radio Television	1 April 2023 - (Every day at 8:00 PM)	Voice-over with Vietnamese

Internationally, Viki and Disney+ also acquired streaming rights.
