= Dear My Friends (Chinese TV series) =

- Promotional image
- Also known as: Dear Them
- Traditional Chinese: 親愛的她們
- Simplified Chinese: 亲爱的她们
- Hanyu Pinyin: Qīn'àidě Tāmēn
- Genre: Drama
- Based on: South Korea television series Dear My Friends
- Written by: Zhao Xin; Yang Nannan; Ma Jian; Guo Shuang; Li Dimin
- Directed by: Cui Liang
- Starring: Song Dandan; Liu Lili; Vivian Wu; Zhu Yin; Yvonne Yung; Zhang Ruoyun
- Opening theme: Only Love by He Jie
- Ending theme: Dear My Friends by Liu Xin
- Country of origin: China
- Original language: Mandarin
- No. of seasons: 1
- No. of episodes: 41

Production
- Executive producer: Li Zhanying
- Production location: Shenzhen
- Production companies: Dongyang Cultural Media Limited Company; China Wit Media Co., Ltd. Juxing Tianxia Media Co., Ltd.

Original release
- Network: Hunan Television iQiyi
- Release: December 10, 2017 – January 1, 2018

Dear My Friends (Chinese: 亲爱的她们) is a 2017 Chinese drama television series directed by Cui Liang and starring Song Dandan, Liu Lili, Vivian Wu, Zhu Yin, Yvonne Yung and Zhang Ruoyun. The series is an adaptation of the 2016 South Korea television series Dear My Friends. The series premiered in China via iQiyi and Hunan Television starting December 10, 2017.

== Synopsis ==
This drama describes the stories between Ma Weihua and her friends in their last years of life, people who say some words like "It is not the end, we're still alive".

== Cast ==
=== Main ===
- Song Dandan as Ma Weihua, landlady of a restaurant, divorced, Gu Jiayi's mother.
- Liu Lili as Shi Huizhen, a retired housewife.
- Vivian Wu as Qiu Ya, a celebrity.
- Zhu Yin as Yan Shunhua, Ma Weihua's friend.
- Yvonne Yung and She Muzi, landlady of a club.
- Zhang Ruoyun as He An'ning, a popular cartoonist. Gu Jiayi's boyfriend.

=== Supporting ===
- Jiang Yan as Gu Jiayi, Ma Weihua's daughter, He An'ning's girlfriend, an Internet writer.
- Du Yuan as Xu Jianshe, Shi Huizhen's husband.
- Qin Han as Song Shuhao
- Yan Minqiu as Ji Shuying
- Xu Li as Xu Jiawen
- Qian Yongchen as Jing Hao
- Wang Ce as Wang Weiguo
- Qiu Yueli as Fu Gui
- Qi Han as Ji Zijun
- Cheng Qimeng as Xiao Pan
- Yu Heng as Yu Deshui
- Shu Yaoxuan as Ma Shouyi
- Zhao Zhengyang as Guan Zhiqiang

== Music ==
No.	Title	Lyrics	Music	Singers	Length
1.	"Only Love (《只因为爱》)" (Opening theme)	Li Ruoxi	Wang Zongxian	He Jie
2.	"Dear My Friends (《亲爱的她》)" (Ending theme)	Li Ruoxi	Wang Zongxian	Liu Xin
3.	"Anyhow (《无论如何》)" (Interlude)	Wang Zongxian	Wang Zongxian	Ye Yongxin
4.	"In My Own Hands (《由自己决定》)" (Interlude)	Li Ruoxi	Wang Zongxian	Jin Zhiwen
5.	"Time is Very Beautiful (《时间很美》)" (Interlude)	Mao Hui	Mao Hui	Ba Tu and Wang Sulong
6.	"When You Get Old (《当你老了》)" (Interlude)	Zhao Zhao	Zhao Zhao	Zhao Zhao
7.	"We are" (Interlude)	Mi Ya	Mi Ya	Mi Ya
8.	"If One Day (《如果有一天》)" (Interlude)	Liu Xin	Liu Xin	Liu Xin
9.	"Dawning Love-affair (《爱之初》)" (Interlude)	Wang Zongxian	Li Ruoxi	Li Ruoxi

== Broadcast ==
Dear My Friends was released on December 10, 2017 in China. As of December 26, the series has had 3 million plays via iQiyi.

=== Reception ===
The drama received mixed reception. On Douban, the series has a score of 6.2 out of 10.

== Ratings ==
- Highest ratings are marked in red, lowest ratings are marked in blue

Broadcast date	Hunan Satellite TV CSM52 City ratings		
Broadcast date	Ratings (%)	Audience share (%)	Rank
2017.12.10	0.727	2.41	4
2017.12.11	0.915	3.26	3
2017.12.12	0.99	3.48	3
2017.12.13	0.915	3.28	4
2017.12.14	1.143	4.04	3
2017.12.15	0.742	2.363	4
2017.12.16	0.796	2.565	3
2017.12.17	0.971	3.121	6
2017.12.18	1.309	4.76	1
2017.12.19	1.353	4.89	1
2017.12.20	1.344	4.85	1
2017.12.21	1.315	4.73	1
2017.12.22	0.961	3.22	2
2017.12.23	1.001	3.32	1
2017.12.24	0.988	3.23	2
2017.12.25	1.208	4.29	1
2017.12.26	1.204	4.26	1
2017.12.27	1.27	4.42	1
2017.12.28	1.176	4.06	1
2017.12.29	0.974	3.143	3
2017.12.30	0.966	3.121	4
2018.1.1	1.117	3.82	3
