= Song Yiren =

Chinese actress (born 1993)

- Born: 7 May 1993 (age 33); Jinan, Shandong, China
- Other name: Ireine
- Education: Beijing Film Academy; Peking University
- Occupation: Actress
- Years active: 2014–present
- Agent: Golden Pond Media

Chinese name
- Chinese: 宋伊人
Transcriptions

Song Yiren (Chinese: 宋伊人; pinyin: Sòng Yīrén; born 7 May 1993), also known as Ireine Song, is a Chinese and Canadian actress. She is known for her role as Sang Sang in the historical fantasy drama Ever Night (2018).

== Early life and education ==
Song emigrated to Canada with her parents when she was eight. She attended high school and university there where she majored in fashion design, but later dropped out.

In 2012, Song returned to China and enrolled in Beijing Film Academy.

== Career ==
In 2015, Song made her acting debut in the historical romance film Time to Love, based on the novel Bu Bu Jing Xin by Tong Hua. She then starred in youth film At Cafe 6 and wuxia film Sword Master in 2016.

In 2018, Song rose to fame for her role as Sang Sang in the historical fantasy drama Ever Night.

In 2019, she starred in the youth sports drama The Prince of Tennis, and fantasy romance drama Flavor It's Yours.

In 2020, Song starred in the romance drama The Best of You in My Mind and Professional Single.

== Filmography ==
=== Film ===
Year	English title	Chinese title	Role	Notes
2015	Time to Love	新步步惊心	Yu Tan	
2016	At Cafe 6	六弄咖啡馆	Song Yiren	
2016	Sword Master	三少爺的劍	young Murong Qiudi	
2017	Special Encounter	美容针	Qi Ying	
2019	The Last Room	最后一间房	Ruo Yi	
2024	Viva La Vida	我们一起摇太阳	Jia Hui	
TBA	The Headliner	头条都是他		
TBA	The Ambush Battle at Shentouling	神头岭伏击战	Zhao Cai Feng	

=== Television series ===
Year	English title	Chinese title	Role	Notes
2016	Nuwa Growth Diary	女娲成长日记	Nuwa	
2018	Ever Night	将夜	Sang Sang	
2018	Time Teaches Me To Love	时光教会我爱你	Lin Lu	
2019	The Prince of Tennis	网球少年	Qi Ying	
2019	Flavor It's Yours	看见味道的你	He Buzui	
2020	Ever Night 2	将夜2	Sang Sang	
2020	A Record of a Mortal's Journey to Immortality	凡人修仙传	Han Yun Zhi (voice)	
2020	The Best of You in My Mind	全世界最好的你	Lin Xichi	
2020	Professional Single	我凭本事单身	Yuan Qian	
2022	Our Times: Persistence	我们这十年: 坚持	Jin Ran	
2023	The Inextricable Destiny	烬相思	He Jiu Ling	
2024	Different Princess	花青歌	Hua Qing Ge	
2024	My Special Girl	独一有二的她	Hao Liang / A Dai Jie	
2024	Her Fantastic Adventures	第二次“初见”	Qi Chun Jiao / Gu Jing Qiao	
2025	Six Sisters	六姊妹	Zhang Qiu Fang [Young]	
2025	Bound at First Sight	最美不过初相见	Lu Jiajia	
2025	Love Formula	爱的方程式	Jian Dan	
TBA	The Moment I Met You	不遇云裳不遇你	Chu Yun Shang	
TBA	Medical Examiner Dr. Qin: Doll	法医秦明之玩偶	Xu Jing	

== Discography ==
Year	English title	Chinese title	Album	Notes/Ref.
2020	"No Resentment"	不怨	Ever Night 2 OST	with Dylan Wang

== Awards and nominations ==
Year	Event	Category	Nominated work	Result	Ref.
2019	6th The Actors of China Awards	Best Actress (Web series)	Ever Night	Won	
