= Ordinary Greatness =

2022 Chinese television series

- Official Poster
- Genre: Action; Youth; Drama
- Written by: Zhao Dong Ling
- Directed by: Ding Hei
- Starring: Zhang Ruoyun; Bai Lu; Wang Jingchun; Ning Li; Xu Kaicheng; Zhao Yang; Cao Lu
- Opening theme: "A Little (一点)" by Zhang Jie
- Ending theme: "I Fearlessly Run To You (我无畏奔向你)" by Lu Hu
- Country of origin: China
- Original language: Mandarin
- No. of episodes: 38

Production
- Producer: Dai Ying
- Production locations: Qingdao, China
- Camera setup: Multiple-camera setup
- Running time: 45 minutes
- Production companies: CCTV iQiyi; Dongyang Thorn Bird

Original release
- Network: CCTV iQiyi
- Release: 28 May – 13 June 2022

Ordinary Greatness (Chinese: 警察荣誉; pinyin: Jǐngchá Róngyù) is a 2022 urban life drama Chinese television series, directed by Ding Hei, co-directed by Bao Chengzhi and Fu Cexin, starring Zhang Ruoyun, Bai Lu, Wang Jingchun, and starring Ning Li, Xu Kaicheng, Zhao Yang and Cao Lu. The drama will be broadcast on CCTV 8 on May 28, 2022, and will be broadcast simultaneously on iQiyi. The drama tells the story of four trainee police officers who experienced various cases at the Balihe Police Station in Pingling City, where the "police situation is high", and grew rapidly under the precepts and deeds of the old policemen, and finally became qualified people's policemen.

== Synopsis ==
Trainee police officers Li Dawei, Xia Jie, Yang Shu, and Zhao Jiwei had various hopes for the police profession at the beginning of their work and life at the police station. When new challenges were brought, they experienced confusion and setbacks, confusion, doubt and even the idea of giving up. However, under the influence of the glorious tradition of the people's police, and in the precepts and deeds of the older generation, these four young people endured hardships. Overcoming the test and growing rapidly, they have a new understanding of their mission and honor, and eventually grow into qualified people's police.

== Cast ==
=== Main characters ===
- Zhang Ruoyun as Li Dawei
  - One of the four new recruits in Balihe, with an optimistic and lively personality, is a well-known thorn in the police station. Tatou, who entered the police force last, stepped on the line in the exams since he was a child, but he has a flexible mind and keen observation ability. He still insisted on the justice in his heart, studied hard, and finally became a qualified people's policeman.
- Bai Lu as Xia Jie
  - Offspring of martyrs. She grew up in the greenhouse but has a heart that dares to meet unknown challenges. She doesn't want to be a flower in the greenhouse, she wants to prove herself. Xia Jie has both the delicacy and tenderness of a girl, as well as her tenacity and unyielding side. After entering the police force, she has always wanted to get rid of the aura of her parents and become a qualified people's policeman.
- Wang Jingchun as Wang Shouyi
  - Director of Balihe Police Station. As a good director, he must handle all relationships well and protect everyone's rights and interests. When dealing with his superiors, he is ruthless and hard-working, begging for perfection. He always tried his best to get the best results for the policemen in the station, especially when the people below got into trouble. He went to plead with the director for the matter of Cao Jianjun. His helplessness and sadness were really touching.

=== Supporting characters ===
- Ning Li as Chen Xincheng
  - Li Dawei's master, the attitude of abiding by duty and the spirit of never giving up are touching. When he was young, he was also a heroic figure. He carried goji berries in his thermos all day long, tried his best to save the suicide victim, but was sued by the relatives of the suicide victim and paid a large sum of money. Too willing to take Li Dawei, but in fact he has a knife mouth and a bean curd heart.
- Xu Kaicheng as Yang Shu
  - Master of law from Peking University, I came to Balihe police station only because I have been at the grassroots level for a year. I didn't expect that the knowledge in books is different from real life. Hope so. Later, under the leadership of his master, Yang Shu experienced a series of difficulties and setbacks, and achieved personal growth. Yang Shu finally returned to the Balihe Police Station and officially became a policeman.
- Zhao Yang as Cao Jianjun
  - Yang Shu's master is kind on the surface, and has a very capable brother-in-law. When encountering things, peace is the most important thing, but when encountering major events, he will even push the apprentice to take the blame. I have always been looked down upon by my mother-in-law, thinking that Cao Jianjun is incompetent and unable to make money as a small policeman, and compares him with the eldest son-in-law everywhere. The more this is the case, the more uneasy Cao Jianjun feels, he feels sorry for his wife, and the more he cares about his mother-in-law's opinion, so he needs to prove himself at work and want his mother-in-law to think highly of him.
- Cao Lu as Zhao Jiwei
  - Apprentice police officer. One of the four newcomers in Balihe. He is from the countryside. He is hardworking, honest and honest. He works hard to achieve his goals but lacks talent. Under the guidance of his master, Zhao Jiwei also realized that community work is no small matter. If you want to achieve great things, start with small things. Zhao Jiwei has also become a qualified community policeman.

== Soundtrack ==
No.	Title	Lyrics	Music	Singers	Length
1.	"A Little (一点)" (Opening Theme song)	Shen Mingli, Xia Yan	Yang Bingyin	Zhang Jie	4:21
2.	"I Fearlessly Run to You (我无畏奔向你)" (Ending theme song)	Wu Jianzhong	Lu Hu	Lu Hu	4:30
3.	"Love (爱)"	Wang Xiaoqian	Yang Bingyin	Kim Min-ki	4:55
4.	"The Return of Target Shooting (打靶归来)"	Niu Baoyuan	Wang Yongquan	–	2:45
5.	"Young Aspirations Don't Sorrow (少年壮志不言愁)"	Lin Ruwei	Lei Lei	–	3:48

== Production ==
=== Behind the scenes ===
In order to play Cao Jianjun well, Zhao Yang once went to a police station in Qingdao, Shandong to experience life. He went out to the police with the police, learned how to obtain information and clues, watched the working status of the interrogated suspects, and went to the cafeteria to eat and chat with them.

In order to write this work well, the screenwriter Zhao Dongling took several young people to interview five police stations and a criminal police team in Jinan, and interviewed dozens of front-line policemen. Several young people even worked several night shifts with the police.

=== Shooting process ===
On April 30, 2021, the play was officially launched in Qingdao; in September, the play was successfully completed in Qingdao.

== Rating ==
Air date	Episodes	China CCTV8 Premier Rating (CSM)		
Air date	Episodes	Ratings (%)	Audience share (%)	Rank
2022.05.28	1-2	0.735	3.471	6
2022.05.29	3-4	0.659	3.686	7
2022.05.30	5-6	0.666	3.773	8
2022.05.31	7-8	0.758	4.213	6
2022.06.1	9-10			
2022.06.2	11-12	0.617	3.224	8
2022.06.3	13-14	0.504	2.383	6
2022.06.4	15-16	0.493	2.329	7
2022.06.5	17-18	0.544	2.983	7
2022.06.6	19-20	0.659	3.793	7
2022.06.7	21-22	0.721	4.202	7
2022.06.8	23-24	0.719	4.182	7
2022.06.9	25-26	0.701	4.146	7
2022.06.10	27-28	0.648	3.138	7
2022.06.11	29-30	0.727	3.458	5
2022.06.12	31-32	0.771	4.425	7
2022.06.13	33-34	0.744	4.280	6
2022.06.14	35-36	0.617	3.663	7
2022.06.15	37-38	0.675	4.013	6

- Highest ratings are marked in red, lowest ratings are marked in blue

The data is provided by Guangshi Suofurui, and the scope of the survey is audiences over the age of four.

The ratings above include CCTV.

Data source: satellite TV things

== Review ==
Under the presupposition that the plot does not focus on major and important cases, "Police Honor" uses wonderful group dramas to construct group portraits of grassroots policemen, and explores what "police honor" is. This drama is different from the thrilling confrontation between police and robbers in conventional criminal investigation dramas, focusing on "small" everywhere. Starting from a small point, it tells about all aspects of police work in Balihe Police Station from the perspective of young policemen, and shows the life of grassroots policemen from the handling of some conflicts and disputes in people's lives. The tense intellectual and physical confrontation between the thoughtful criminal policeman and the cold-blooded killer cannot be seen in "Bali River". The screenwriter used the careful observation of grassroots life to write the most flesh-and-blood portraits of the characters. Not only that, the grassroots policemen "speak human words", less big words and empty words, which make people listen to it very pleasantly, and it also reflects the major breakthrough in the concept of creation of this type of drama-ordinary characters are heroes.

Although the tone of the play is a light comedy, in the narrative of life, seeking praise for the daily work of the police is the original intention of creation. Therefore, we have seen TV series use the most common police station stories to realize the praise of the grassroots police. And this kind of praise is integrated into the specific life narrative, which is where the screenwriter's creative wisdom lies. In fact, the focus of life-oriented narrative dramas is on character creation. As long as the role is successfully portrayed, the audience is willing to follow. At the beginning of the play, a long shot and a ten-minute scene with Wang Jingchun alone achieved this very well. From the phone call between director Wang Shouyi and his immediate boss, the audience can capture the basic situation and characteristics of the four newcomers who are about to report to the grassroots. As a result, not only did the image of a sophisticated and sleek director of the police station stand up, but the audience also had a preliminary impression of the four newcomers, completing a unique group portrait sketch. This kind of fast pace and the ability to create a group of characters is something that many of our young screenwriters do not have. It was this good play at the beginning that made people catch the signal of a good play.

It is undeniable that the play is loved by many audiences, especially young audiences, because it has opened up a life-oriented innovation road on the basis of genre dramas and traditional police stories with hard bridges and hard horses. . Comparing the show with recent hit cop dramas shows that most of the cases the show deals with are trivial by any stretch of the imagination, both in terms of portraying this particular industry. On the whole, looking for excitement, highlights, and intensive conflicts has never been what Zhao Dongling's screenwriting team loves, but pursuing life and natural expression of life has always been what Zhao Dongling is good at. Many of the works of this female screenwriter reflect her expertise. At the moment when police dramas are booming, audiences will definitely look forward to some different types of dramas in aesthetic fatigue. "Police Honor" breaks the stereotype of the police in the minds of the general public in a comedy way, with both humorous wit and humanitarian care. More importantly, it breaks the topic with a life-like style, weaves new ideas, and weaves wonderful. ("Wen Wei Po" review)
