= Bunshinsaba 3 =

- Theatrical poster
- Directed by: Ahn Byeong-ki
- Written by: Ahn Byeong-ki; Lee Sun-ahn; Yang Zhe
- Starring: Jiang Yiyan; Jiao Junyan
- Production company: China Film Group Corporation
- Release date: 4 July 2014
- Running time: 100 minutes
- Country: China
- Language: Mandarin
- Box office: US$7,890,000

Bunshinsaba 3 (simplified Chinese: 笔仙III; traditional Chinese: 筆仙III; pinyin: Bǐxiān III) is a 2014 Chinese horror film directed by Ahn Byeong-ki.

== Plot ==
A mental patient with a heart problem, Xu Lian, escapes from her facility to take back her daughter, Xiao Ai, from her grandparents' home. Her grandparents attempt to take Xiao Ai elsewhere, but their car crashes with Xiao Ai as the only survivor. Xu Lian decides to move to her grandfather's villa in a remote countryside with Xiao Ai. Xu Lian begins to experience haunting since the first night she moved in, including a girl with a charred face, which she suspects comes from the girl's painting in the staircase wall. Xiao Ai, meanwhile, discovers a tricycle that belongs to "Xiao Ai", apparently the name of the charred girl. Everyone in the village also seem to know Xu Lian to some degree, including a mentally handicapped man who claims to be searching for his wife and daughter.

After getting fed up by the local kindergarten's headmistress who degrades Xiao Ai's antisocial attitude, Xu Lian hires a tutor, Yuan Yuan, for Xiao Ai, though she initially dismisses her for her young age. Yuan Yuan, who is an expert at ouija, reciprocates a colleague who falls in love with her and agrees to be more intimate if he agrees to do something. To remove and burn the girl painting, Xu Lian borrows a hammer from a neighbor whose husband works as an artist. When she returns the hammer at another night, Xu Lian discovers her neighbor killed by her husband and promptly runs away until she passes out from her sickness. When she tries to call the police, no trace of the killing is found.

Yuan Yuan permanently becomes Xiao Ai's tutor, but bolts away when she suffers a stomachache, which she reveals to her colleague is because she is pregnant by her art teacher, Xu Kuizhe. Her request is revealed: she wants her colleague to help her abort the child. He refuses and attempts to attack her, but passes out when he hits his head with a concrete. Believing him dead, Yuan Yuan heads to Xu Lian's residence but is taken by Kuizhe. Realizing that Kuizhe is her neighbor's husband, Xu Lian goes to his residence and saves Yuan Yuan before he is able to continue assaulting her. She is promptly chased by Kuizhe until a car hits him, but no trace of the accident is found.

After giving birth and rejecting her daughter, Yuan Yuan forcefully takes Xiao Ai to the attic of Xu Lian's house. From several papers handed by the handicapped man, Xu Lian learns that he is Yuan Yuan's colleague who went crazy after Yuan Yuan abandoned him. She confronts Yuan Yuan in the attic and learns the full truth: Yuan Yuan is really Xu Lian as she appeared ten years ago. Yuan Yuan was made pregnant by Xu Kuizhe, who was hit by a car shortly after. Kuizhe's parents apologized and allowed her to take a new identity as their granddaughter: Xu Lian. Five years afterward, Xiao Ai was burned alive in the attic while playing hide-and-seek with Yuan Yuan, the latter not being able to help due to her sickness. Yuan Yuan went mad and convinced herself that her daughter is still alive. To circumvent this, Kuizhe's parents adopted a girl, Wen Wen, and forced her to become "Xiao Ai" under the threat of being returned to her orphanage.

Several weeks later, Yuan Yuan visits the mental facility to view her interview videos. She rejects the doctor's insistence about her daughter's demise and goes outside, where she is greeted by Wen Wen.

== Cast ==
- Jiang Yiyan
- Jiao Junyan
- Wang Longhua
- Dong Zijian
- Xu Ang
- Zhao Zixuan
- Rong Yi

== Inspirations ==
The plot of Bunshinsaba 3 bears much in common with the 1980 Canadian horror film The Changeling.

The opening credits to Bunshinsaba 3 (2014) recall the opening credits to Insidious (2010) and the opening credits to Insidious: Chapter 2 (2013).
