= Mao Ni =

Chinese author of Xuanhuan novels (born 1977)

- 猫腻
- Born: November 18, 1977 (age 48); Yiling District, Yichang, Hubei, China.
- Occupation: Author
- Writing career
- Genres: Fantasy, Xuanhuan novels

Mao Ni (Chinese: 猫腻; pinyin: Māo Nì; born 1977) is a Chinese author of xianxia novels. His most famous work is the web novel, Ze Tian Ji (Way of Choices) which has been adapted into an action TV drama, Fighter of the Destiny. In 2017, it was placed first on the Chinese social media site Weibo's poll of most-anticipated TV dramas of 2017. His web novel Jiang Ye (Nightfall) was adapted into the TV series Ever Night. His novels are published on the Webnovel platform, an English-language website and mobile platform launched by China Literature, Chinas largest online publishing company.

Mao and Joy of Life were the subject of significant online criticism during the political disputes arising from the THAAD deployment by South Korea. Mao voiced a defense of the K Pop idol Taeyeon, who had posted a picture of Lotte brand candy on her Instagram account (many Chinese viewed Taeyeon's post as expressing support for the THAAD deployment because the Lotte company had provided land for it). In response to Mao's defense of Taeyeon, angry Chinese internet users left one star reviews for Joy of Life, resulting in a 38% one star rating. Mao issued an apology on Weibo.

== Web novels ==
- Zhuque Ji (2005–2007)
- Joy of Life (2007–2009)
- The Outcast (2009–2011)
- Nightfall (2011–2014)
- Way of Choices (2014–2017)
- The Path Toward Heaven (2017–2020)

== Other media ==
- Way of Choices (anime TV series, 2015)
- The Outcast (anime TV series, 2016)
- Fighter of the Destiny (live action TV series, 2017)
- Ever Night (live action TV series, 2018)
- Joy of Life Season 1 (live action TV series, 2019)
- The Outcast (live action TV series, 2023)
- Joy of Life Season 2 (live action TV series, 2024)

== Awards ==
=== Won ===
- Sina 4th Original Contest Fantasy Martial Arts Awards Final Evaluation List, First Place 2015 (Suzaku)
- 20 Years of Chinese Network Literature 20 Years, First Place 2018 (The Outcast)
- The First Internet Literature Biennial Awards, First Place 2015 (Nightfall)

=== Nominated ===
- West Lake Type Biennial Award Fantasy Martial Arts Awards Final Evaluation List, First Place 2015 (Suzaku)
- Global Chinese Science Fiction Nebula Awards, Most popular mobile phone reader, Second Place 2014 (The Outcast)
