= Bai Fengxi =

Chinese actress, and playwright

Bai Fengxi (白峰溪; born 1934 in Wen'an) is a Chinese actress, and playwright. She studied at North China People's Revolutionary University. In 1954, she joined the China Youth Theater.

She married Yan Zhongying; they have a daughter named Yan Fanfan. Bai's grandson is actor Liu Duanduan.

== Works ==
- Mingyue chu zhao ren (When the Bright Moon Shines), 1981
- Fengyu guren lai (An Old Friend Comes at a Stormy Time), 1983
- Buzhi qiusi zai shui jia (Say Who like Me is Prey to Fond Regret), 1986
- (The Crescent and the Full Moon), 1991
- The Women Trilogy, Chinese Literature Press, January 1, 1991, ISBN 978-7-5071-0070-9

== Sources ==
- Xiaomei Chen (2002). Acting the right part: political theater and popular drama in contemporary China. University of Hawaii Press. ISBN 978-0-8248-2483-9.
- Constantine Tung; Colin Mackerras, eds. (1987). Drama in the People's Republic of China. SUNY Press. ISBN 978-0-88706-389-3.
