= Ouyang Nini =

Taiwanese singer (born 2000)

- 歐陽妮妮
- Born: 9 March 1996 (age 29); Taipei, Taiwan
- Occupation: Actress
- Spouse: Bryan Chang (m. 2024)
- Parent(s): Ouyang Lung; Fu Chuen
- Relatives: Ouyang Fei Fei (aunt)

Chinese name
- Traditional Chinese: 歐陽妮妮
- Simplified Chinese: 欧阳妮妮
- Hanyu Pinyin: Ōuyáng Níní
- Jyutping: Au1joeng4 Ni2ni2

Ouyang Nini (Chinese: 歐陽妮妮; pinyin: Ōuyáng Níní; born 9 March 1996) is a Taiwanese actress. She is a member of the Ouyang family, known for its artistic background in Taiwan.

== Biography ==
Ouyang was born on 9 March 1996 in Taipei. She is the eldest daughter of actors Ouyang Long and Fu Juan, and the older sister of Ouyang Nana and Ouyang Didi. In 2015, she was admitted to Temple University in the United States. Later, in order to balance her acting career in Taiwan, she changed her major to the Department of Drama at the Department of Continuing Education and Extension of the National Taiwan University of Arts. She announced her suspension in 2018.

Ouyang's agent is Fu Juan, the head of Ninadi International Co., Ltd. In 2020, she played the leading female role in "The Haunted Heart" for the first time.

Ouyang has been married to Bryan Chang since 29 June 2024. In January 2025, her first son was born, and in April, it was announced that the family of three would move to Hangzhou, China.

== Controversies ==
=== Posting a wrong photo of the plane to mourn the crash ===
On 26 July 2014, three days after the TransAsia Airways Flight 222 crash, Ouyang posted a photo of Flight B-22807 on Instagram, where netizens criticized her for spreading false information. They said that the photo was not of the crashed plane, and that the plane was still on duty. The crashed plane's number was B-22810, and asked her not to post false information on the Internet for the sake of clicks and exposure. However, Ouyang may have felt that this was inappropriate and deleted the photo afterwards.

=== Playing in a shopping cart at a store and lying about filming arrangements ===
On 26 July 2015, actor Bruce Hung shared a video on Instagram of him and Ouyang shopping at a store. In the video, Hung was pushing the cart. The cart seat could only bear 15 kg. Ouyang, who was 168 cm tall and weighed 52 kg, actually sat on the shopping cart directly, which was criticized by netizens. After the video was exposed, netizens immediately criticized her for being ignorant and destroying public property, and scolded her for being "unethical and sitting in a cart at such a age." Hung said through his agent: "I was actually filming a movie when I was sitting in the cart."

However, the voices of netizens questioning it became louder and louder, and they all expressed their desire to see if there was such a scene in the movie. Hung's agent then changed his words and apologized on his behalf, admitting that Ouyang was not sitting in the cart at the store for filming, but for having fun on the spot, which directly exposed Ouyang's lie.

=== Showing off drinking NT$1,320 worth of juice ===
Ouyang posted a message on Facebook, which turned out that drinking 6 bottles a day would cost her NT$1,320. Netizens couldn't help but mock her for showing off her wealth and being "ignorant of the suffering of the world." The money she spent on juice a day was higher than the daily wage of a laborer.
