= Medical Examiner Dr. Qin =

2016 Chinese web series

- Chinese: 法医秦明
- Genre: Police procedural Crime; Suspense
- Based on: The Eleventh Finger by Qin Ming
- Screenplay by: Guo Linyuan; Yang Zhe
- Directed by: Xu Ang
- Starring: Zhang Ruoyun; Jiao Junyan; Li Xian
- Ending theme: Wont Perish (不灭) by Zhang Ruoyun
- Composer: Chen Zhiyi (Season 2)
- Country of origin: China
- Original language: Mandarin
- No. of seasons: 3
- No. of episodes: 20/season

Production
- Production companies: Beijing Bojitianjuan Film and TV

Original release
- Network: Sohu TV
- Release: 13 October – 15 December 2016

Medical Examiner Dr. Qin (Chinese: 法医秦明) is a 2016 Chinese streaming television series adapted from the novel The Eleventh Finger (Chinese: 第十一根手指) by Qin Ming. It follows an investigative team consisting of medical examiner Qin Ming, his assistant Li Dabao and police officer Lin Tao as they solve mysterious criminal cases.

Produced by Beijing Bojitianjuan Film and TV, the series premiered in October 2016 on the streaming service Sohu TV. A second season ran in April 2017 and the third was broadcast in 2018.

== Cast ==
- Zhang Ruoyun as Qin Ming (S1)
- Jiao Junyan as Li Dabao (S1)
- Li Xian as Lin Tao (S1)

== Reception ==
The series is one of the most successful network drama on Sohu TV, with 1.5 billion views. Considered as a pioneer of its genre, the series helped shed light on the profession of a forensic doctor by delving into their hardships and professional working attitudes. It has been praised for its bold plots, tense storyline and good-looking performers. The series was also ranked as one of the top 10 web dramas at the 2016 ENAwards.

== Awards and nominations ==
Year	Award	Category	Nominated	Result	Ref.
2017	2nd Golden Guduo Media Awards	Breakthrough Web Series	Medical Examiner Dr. Qin	Won	
2017	4th Hengdian Film and TV Festival of China	Online Popularity Award	Medical Examiner Dr. Qin	Won	
