= Soundwave =

Soundwave or Sound Wave may refer to:

- Sound, a vibration that propagates as an acoustic wave
- Acoustic wave, the wave which carries sound

== Festivals ==
- Soundwave (Australian music festival), an annual music festival 2007–2016
- Soundwave Festival (San Francisco), a biennial sound, art and music festival in the US

== Music ==
- Sound Wave (album), by Stanley Huang, 2003
- Sound Wave, a 2013 album by Makua Rothman
- "Sound Wave", a song by Yusef Lateef from the 1966 album A Flat, G Flat and C

== Other ==
- Soundwave (Transformers), a fictional character
- Soundwave (mobile application)
- The Wave 96.4 FM, formerly 96.4 Sound Wave, a Welsh radio station
- Sound Wave, a marching band formed by Seattle Sounders FC supporters

== See also ==
- Sounwave, music producer
- Onda Sonora: Red Hot + Lisbon, a 1998 compilation album
- Sound (disambiguation)
- Wave (disambiguation)
