= 20 Once Again =

20 Once Again may refer to:

- 20 Once Again (film), a 2015 film
- 20 Once Again (TV series), a 2018 television series adapted from the film
