= The Sound =

The Sound or The Sounds may refer to:

== Film ==
- The Sound (film), a Canadian psychological thriller film

== Geography ==
- The Sound or Øresund, the strait between Sweden and Denmark
- Plymouth Sound, the inlet of the English Channel at Plymouth, England
- Long Island Sound, the body of water between Connecticut and Long Island, United States
- Puget Sound, an inlet of the Pacific Ocean in the U.S. state of Washington
- The Sounds of the Outer Banks, North Carolina, these include Currituck Sound, Pamlico Sound, Albemarle Sound, Croatan Sound and Roanoke Sound.
- The Sound, a small cay rising above sea level at Middleton Reef in the Coral Sea Islands, Australia

== Music ==
=== Performers ===
- The Sound (band), an English post-punk band 1979–1988
- The Sounds, a Swedish indie-rock band formed in 1998
- Stan Getz (1927–1991), nicknamed "The Sound", American jazz saxophonist

=== Albums ===
- The Sound (Mary Mary album) or the title song, 2008
- The Sound (New Monsoon album) or the title song, 2005
- The Sound (Stray Kids album) or the title song (see below), 2023
- The Sound, by Elevation Worship, 2007

=== Songs ===
- "The Sound" (The 1975 song), 2016
- "The Sound" (Stray Kids song), 2023
- "The Sound (John M. Perkins' Blues)", by Switchfoot, 2009
- "The Sound", by Carly Rae Jepsen from Dedicated, 2019
- "The Sound", by Swans from Soundtracks for the Blind, 1996

== Radio ==
- KKLQ (FM) 100.3, a radio station in Los Angeles formerly known as "The Sound"
- The Sound (radio station), a radio station network in New Zealand

== Television ==
- The Sound (Australian TV series), Australian music program broadcast on the ABC
- The Sound (Chinese TV series), a Chinese reality series broadcast on Hunan TV

== See also ==
- Sound (disambiguation)
