= History of Spotify =

History of the Swedish audio streaming company Spotify

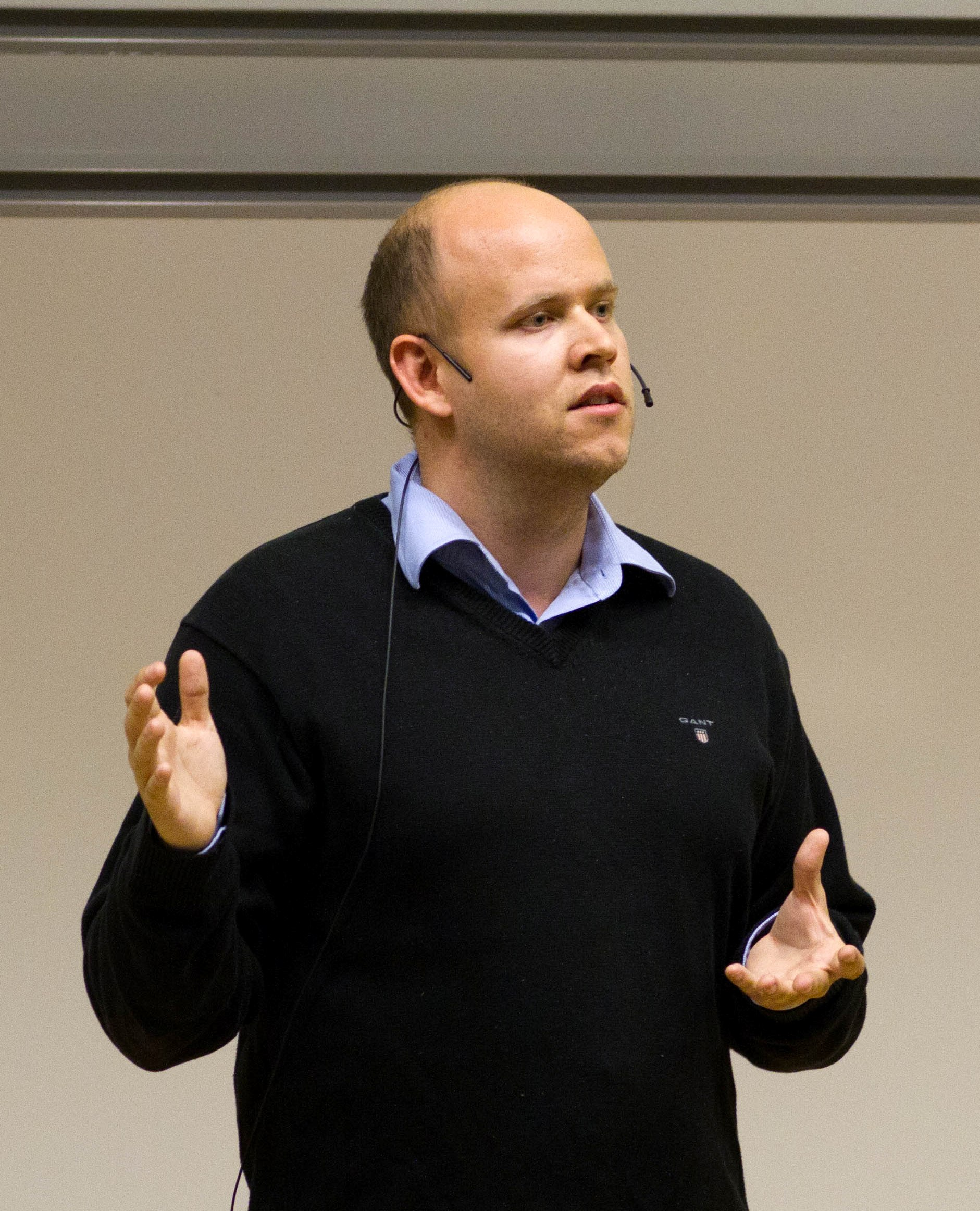
Daniel Ek

Swedish audio streaming company Spotify was founded in 2006 by Daniel Ek and Martin Lorentzon. Its service launched in Europe in 2008 and subsequently expanded internationally.

During the 2010s and 2020s, Spotify expanded from music streaming into podcasting, audiobooks and other audio services through acquisitions, partnerships and original content.

== Foundation and launch ==
=== Early concept and founding ===
Daniel Ek said he first conceived of Spotify around 2002, after the peer-to-peer music service Napster shut down and the illegal file-sharing service Kazaa became popular. He said he concluded that piracy could not be eliminated solely through legislation and that a legal service would need to provide an alternative attractive enough to compete with piracy while compensating the music industry.

Ek's original proposal to Lorentzon was not limited to music. He initially envisioned streaming video, digital films, images and music as a means of generating advertising revenue.

According to Ek, the name Spotify originated from a word initially misheard from something Lorentzon had said; the founders later associated it with the words "spot" and "identify".

Spotify was founded in April 2006 in Stockholm, Sweden, by Daniel Ek, former chief technology officer of Stardoll, and Martin Lorentzon, co-founder of Tradedoubler.

=== European launch ===
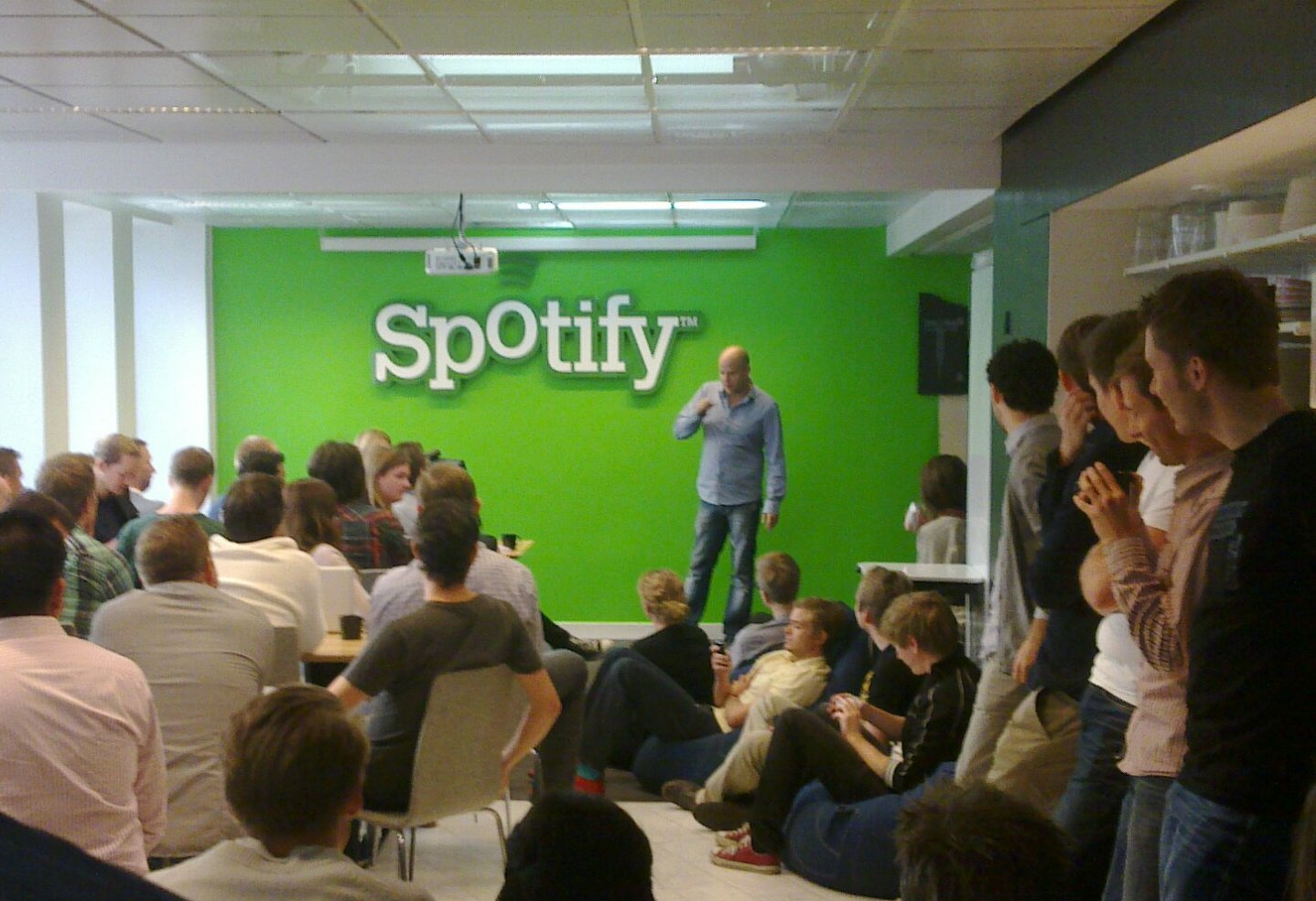
Daniel Ek addressing Spotify staff in 2010

Spotify launched in several European markets in October 2008, including Finland, France, Great Britain, Norway, Spain and Sweden. The service operated with different tiers and pricing in different countries.

In February 2009, the free service tier became available to British users through public registration. Following a surge in registrations after the release of Spotify's mobile service, the company halted registration for the free service in September and returned the United Kingdom to an invitation-only model.

By October 2010, Spotify had 10 million registered users across Europe, including 500,000 paying subscribers.

=== United States launch ===
Spotify launched in the United States in July 2011 with a six-month, advertising-supported trial period during which new users could listen to unlimited music.

In January 2012, the expiry of the trial periods introduced limits of ten hours of streaming per month and five plays per song. In March 2012, Spotify removed the limits on its free service tier, including on mobile devices.

== Growth and expansion, 2011–2014 ==
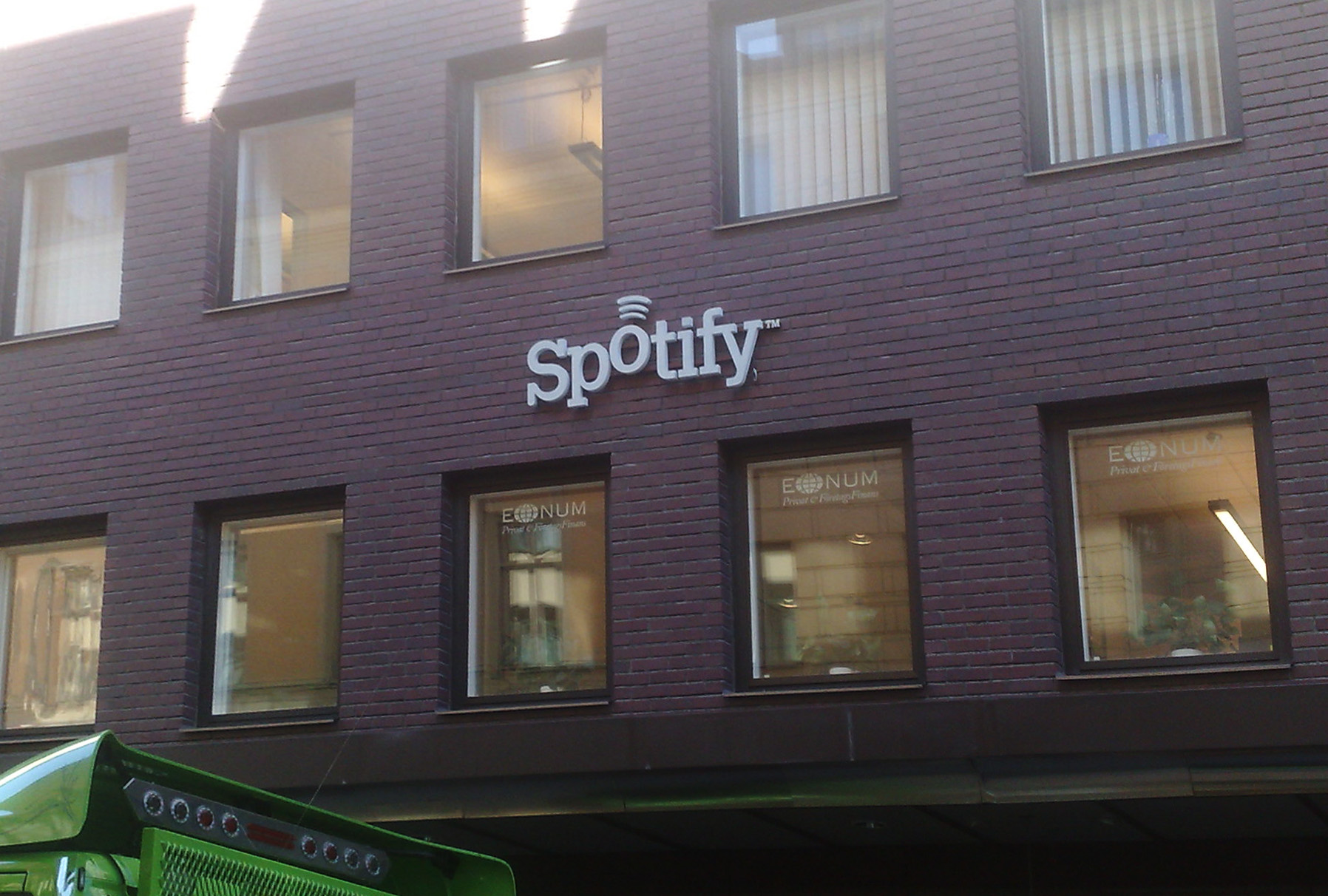
Spotify's former headquarters in Stockholm, Sweden

Spotify's paying subscriber base expanded rapidly during the early 2010s. In March 2011, the company announced one million paying subscribers in Europe, and by September the number had doubled to two million.

In August 2012, Time reported 15 million active users, including four million paying subscribers.

By December 2012, Spotify had 20 million active users, including five million paying customers globally and one million paying customers in the United States.

The service reached 24 million active users, including six million paying subscribers, in March 2013.

In May 2013, Spotify acquired music-discovery application Tunigo.

In March 2014, it acquired The Echo Nest, a music-intelligence company.

Spotify reached 40 million users, including ten million paying subscribers, in May 2014.

User numbers then reached 60 million, including 15 million paying users, in December 2014.

== Expansion through technology and partnerships, 2015–2017 ==
In January 2015, Sony announced PlayStation Music, with Spotify as its exclusive music partner. The service incorporated Spotify into the PlayStation 3, PlayStation 4 and Sony Xperia devices and launched on 30 March 2015.

In June 2015, Spotify acquired Seed Scientific, a data-science consulting and analytics company. Spotify said that Seed Scientific's team would lead an advanced analytics unit focused on developing data services.

In July 2015, Spotify encouraged App Store subscribers to cancel subscriptions purchased through Apple and subscribe through Spotify's website, avoiding Apple's 30% transaction fee for in-app purchases.

In October 2015, "Thinking Out Loud" by Ed Sheeran became the first song to surpass 500 million streams on Spotify.

In November 2015, Spotify announced that "Lean On" by Major Lazer and DJ Snake, featuring MØ, had become its most-streamed song, with more than 525 million streams worldwide.

In January 2016, Spotify acquired Cord Project and Soundwave, followed by CrowdAlbum in April and Preact in November.

In April 2016, Daniel Ek and Martin Lorentzon published an open letter to Swedish politicians calling for changes to policies concerning housing, education and stock options. They argued that these issues hindered Spotify's ability to recruit employees and warned that jobs could move from Sweden to the United States if changes were not made.

In April 2016, Rihanna overtook Justin Bieber to become Spotify's most-streamed artist by monthly active listeners, with 31.3 million. In May, Drake overtook Rihanna with 31.85 million monthly listeners.

Spotify reached 30 million paying subscribers in March 2016 and 40 million in September 2016. Total users reached 100 million in June 2016.

In December 2016, The Weeknd overtook Drake as Spotify's most-streamed artist. Later that month, Drake's "One Dance" became the first song to reach one billion streams on Spotify.

In 2017, Spotify acquired Sonalytic, MightyTV, Mediachain, Niland and Soundtrap.

In March 2017, Spotify announced partnerships with the South by Southwest conference, WNYC Studios and Waze.

In March 2017, Financial Times reported that Spotify and major record labels were negotiating licensing agreements under which selected newly released albums could initially be restricted to Spotify's Premium tier in return for reduced royalty fees.

In April 2017, Spotify and Universal Music Group agreed that artists represented by Universal could restrict new albums to Premium subscribers for a maximum of two weeks, while singles would remain available to all users. Later that month, the arrangement was extended to independent artists represented by the Merlin Network.

In August 2017, "Look What You Made Me Do" by Taylor Swift received more than eight million streams in 24 hours, setting a record for the most single-day streams for a track.

In October 2017, Microsoft announced that it would discontinue Groove Music, with users able to transfer their music to Spotify.

In December 2017, Spotify and Tencent Music Entertainment agreed to exchange stakes and invest in each other's music businesses.

== Public listing and podcast expansion, 2018–2020 ==
Spotify became publicly traded in April 2018 through a direct public offering rather than a conventional initial public offering. The transaction was intended to allow existing investors to sell their holdings rather than raise new capital.

Spotify began trading on the New York Stock Exchange on 3 April 2018. CNBC reported that the shares opened at $165.90, more than 25% above the reference price of $132.

In April 2018, Spotify acquired the music-licensing platform Loudr.

In February 2018, Spotify integrated with Discord, allowing users to display currently playing songs and invite Premium users to group listening sessions. In April, Spotify and Hulu introduced a discounted entertainment bundle.

In August 2018, Spotify acquired exclusive rights to The Joe Budden Podcast and expanded the programme to a twice-weekly schedule.

On 14 November 2018, Spotify announced expansion into 13 markets in the Middle East and North Africa (MENA) region, including the creation of an Arabic hub and playlists.

Spotify released its first Apple Watch application in November 2018.

On 6 February 2019, Spotify acquired Gimlet Media and Anchor as part of an expansion into podcasting. In March, Spotify acquired podcast network Parcast.

On 13 March 2019, Spotify filed an antitrust complaint against Apple with the European Commission, alleging unfair App Store practices.

Spotify acquired SoundBetter in September 2019.

In November 2019, Spotify acquired exclusive rights to The Last Podcast on the Left.

In 2020, Spotify partnered with ESPN and Netflix to curate podcasts around The Last Dance. Spotify also signed a deal with Chernin Entertainment to develop films and television programmes based on podcasts.

In February 2020, Spotify announced the acquisition of The Ringer.

In May 2020, Spotify acquired exclusive rights to The Joe Rogan Experience, beginning in September, in an agreement reported at approximately US$100 million.

In April 2020, Spotify reached 133 million premium users. Spotify reported a decline in users in countries affected by the COVID-19 pandemic in late February 2020, followed by a recovery.

In November 2020, Spotify announced plans to acquire Megaphone for US$235 million.

In July 2020, Spotify's integration with DJ software was removed.

== Developments, 2021–2022 ==
In January 2021, Spotify tested a selection of audiobooks on the service.

On 1 March 2021, Spotify confirmed that it would no longer have access to music distributed by South Korean company Kakao Entertainment. The removal was attributed to Spotify's launch in South Korea, where it competed with Kakao Entertainment's Melon. Kakao subsequently reached an agreement with Spotify that restored its content to the platform.

In March 2021, Spotify acquired Betty Labs and its live-audio application Locker Room. The application was subsequently rebranded as Spotify Greenroom and later Spotify Live.

Spotify acquired Podz in June 2021, and acquired exclusive rights to Call Her Daddy that month.

In October 2021, Spotify sold SoundBetter back to its founders.

In November 2021, Spotify acquired audiobook company Findaway, including its publishing imprint OrangeSky Audio.

In November 2021, Spotify removed the "shuffle" button from albums following a request by singer Adele, who argued that albums should be played in the order specified by the artist.

In December 2021, Spotify acquired Whooshkaa, a podcast technology company that developed tools for broadcasters to convert radio content into on-demand podcasts.

In February 2022, Spotify acquired podcast-advertising companies Chartable and Podsights.

Spotify had 182 million premium subscribers in March 2022.

In 2022, Spotify became the official audio streaming partner of FC Barcelona. In May, Spotify partnered with Roblox, launching "Spotify Island".

In June 2022, Spotify acquired synthetic-voice and video developer Sonantic. In July, it acquired Heardle, a music-trivia game inspired by Wordle.

At the end of the second quarter of 2022, Spotify reported 188 million paying subscribers and 433 million total users.

In October 2022, Spotify acquired Dublin-based content-moderation company Kinzen.

== Developments since 2023 ==
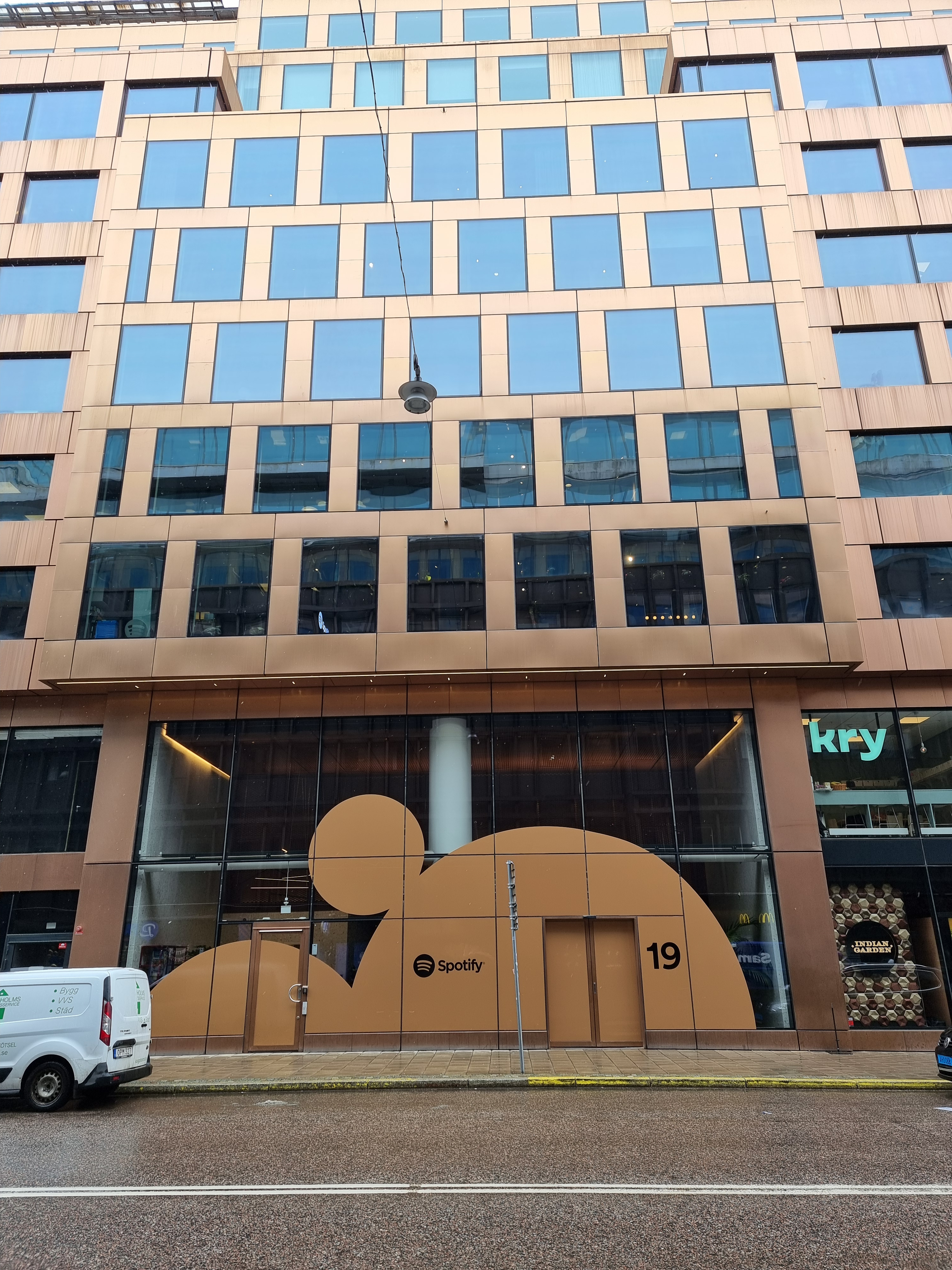
Spotify offices in Stockholm, 2024

In 2023, Spotify merged Anchor into Spotify for Podcasters as part of a reorganisation of its creator tools. Spotify also announced a partnership with Patreon intended to allow creators to receive direct payments from fans while allowing fans to listen to Patreon content through Spotify.

Spotify Live was shut down in April 2023. Heardle was shut down in May 2023.

In May 2023, Spotify removed tens of thousands of songs, representing approximately 7% of tracks uploaded by Boomy, because of suspected "artificial streaming", in which automated accounts are used to inflate listening statistics.

In November 2023, Spotify expanded access to more than 200,000 audiobooks for Premium subscribers.

Also in November 2023, Spotify announced a new royalty model taking effect in 2024. The changes were intended in part to reduce fraudulent royalty payments associated with short "functional" tracks such as environmental sounds and white noise.

In April 2024, the audiobook offering was expanded to Canada, Ireland and New Zealand, with the catalogue expanded to 250,000 books.

In November 2024, Spotify for Podcasters was renamed Spotify for Creators.

At the end of the third quarter of 2024, Spotify reported 252 million subscribers and 640 million monthly active users.

In 2022, Dagens Nyheter compared Spotify streaming data with documents obtained from the Swedish copyright collection society STIM and reported that approximately 20 songwriters were responsible for the work of more than 500 credited artists. In December 2024, Harper's Magazine published a report alleging that Spotify had populated playlists with "ghost artists" created by production companies to reduce royalty costs and increase profits.

In 2025, Spotify donated $150,000 to U.S. president Donald Trump's inauguration ceremony and hosted an inauguration-related brunch.

In September 2025, Spotify reintroduced integration with DJ software, with support for Serato, Rekordbox and Djay.

On 6 October 2025, Spotify announced a partnership with OpenAI to bring music and podcast recommendations into ChatGPT, allowing users to link Spotify accounts and discover and queue content through conversations.

In November 2025, Spotify acquired music database WhoSampled.

In December 2025, more than 300 terabytes of files were reportedly scraped from Spotify's servers and uploaded to Anna's Archive. Spotify condemned the incident, said that it had introduced additional safeguards and banned accounts believed to be connected to the leak.

In February 2026, Spotify announced that it had added 38 million users in the three months to the end of December 2025, reaching 751 million monthly users.
