= Tan Songyun =

Chinese actress

- 谭松韵
- Tan in Road Home (2023)
- Born: Luzhou, Sichuan, China
- Other name: Seven Tan
- Education: Beijing Film Academy
- Occupation: Actress
- Years active: 2005–present

Chinese name
- Simplified Chinese: 谭松韵
- Traditional Chinese: 譚松韻
Transcriptions
Standard Mandarin
- Hanyu Pinyin: Tán Sōngyùn

Tan Songyun, also known as Seven, is a Chinese actress and singer. She is best known for her roles in television series The Whirlwind Girl (2015), With You (2016), The Fox's Summer (2017), Under the Power (2019), Go Ahead (2020), The Sword and the Brocade (2021), Flight to You (2022), As Beautiful as You (2024), The Unclouded Soul (2025) and Against the Current (2026). On October 17, 2019, she was selected into the 2019 Forbes China 30 Under 30 Elite List.

== Career ==
Tan started her career as a child actress in 2005, when she filmed the television series Wild Chrysanthemum. She gained more attention in 2012, after starring in the hit historical drama Empresses in the Palace. She then starred in youth dramas The Whirlwind Girl and With You. Both dramas gave her more recognition and popularity. She won the Most Promising Actress award at the iQIYI All-Star Carnival for her role in With You and the Best New Actress award at the Huading Awards for My Whirlwind Girl.

In 2017, she starred in hit romantic comedy drama The Fox's Summer, which won her the Best Actress award for the network section at the Asia New Media Film Award as well as the Golden Bone Flower Awards. The same year she starred in the youth sports romance drama My Mr. Mermaid.

In 2019, Tan starred in the historical mystery drama Under the Power. Forbes China listed Tan under their 30 Under 30 Asia 2019 list which consisted of 30 influential people under 30 years old who have had a substantial effect in their fields.

In 2020, Tan starred in the period action drama The Eight produced by Chen Kaige, slice-of-life family drama Go Ahead, and period drama Dear Mayang Street.

In 2021, she starred in the historical romance drama The Sword and the Brocade.

In 2021, Tan terminated her endorsement contract with the clothing manufacturer Nike after the company put out a statement that they will not use cotton produced in the Xinjiang region of China for human rights violations against Uyghurs.

== Filmography ==
=== Film ===
Year	English title	Chinese title	Role	Notes	Ref.
2008	5.12 Wen Chuan doesn't believe tears	5.12汶川不相信眼泪	Li Xiangbao		
2012	A Recording Pen's Confession	一支录音笔的自白	Wan Dou	Short film	
2012	Republic of China's Police	民国警花	Wu Yue		
2012	Caught in the Web	搜索	Little nanny	Cameo	
2013	Switch	富春山居图	Pisces Demon		
2013	Silent Witness	全民目击	Gao Lingling		
2015	The Spring of My Life	最美的时候遇见你	Yang Fangfang		
2016	Love O2O	微微一笑很倾城	Er Xi		
2017	Nice Meet	再见路星河	Geng Geng	Cameo	
2021	Endless Summer	八月未央	Xiao Qiao		
2023	So Long for Love	再见，李可乐	Li Yan		

=== Television series ===
Year	English title	Chinese title	Role	Notes	Ref.
2005	Live Your Days Peacefully	好好过日子	Chun Li		
2006	I'll Wait for You at Heaven	我在天堂等你	Young Mu Mian		
2007	Wild Chrysanthemum	山菊花	Xiao Ju		
2011	Lohas Family	乐活家庭	Jiang Beidi		
2011	My Passionate Youth	我的燃情岁月	Hui Annu's sister		
2012	Empresses in the Palace	甄嬛传	Fang Chunyi		
2012	Master Lin at Seoul	林师傅在首尔	Quan Jinxiu		
2012	The City of Fog	雾都	Mei Qi		
2012	We Love You Mr. Jin	金太狼的幸福生活	Mu Tong		
2012	Happiness Attack	幸福攻略	Fei'er		
2013	Mother's Glorious Days	妈妈的花样年华	Su Xiaoman		
2014	The Master of the House	大当家	Gui Huaxiang		
2014	Happiness, Please Wait for Me	幸福请你等等我	He Duoduo		
2015	Warm Men's Love and War	暖男的爱情与战争	Guo Yan		
2015	Sun Lao Stubborn	孙老倔的幸福	Wang Huanhuan		
2015	The Whirlwind Girl	旋风少女	Fan Xiaoying	Season 1–2	
2016	With You	最好的我们	Geng Geng		
2017	The Fox's Summer	狐狸的夏天	Li Yanshu	Season 1–2	
2017	My Mr. Mermaid	浪花一朵朵	Yun Duo		
2017	Faceoff	特化师	Chen Zhen		
2019	Under the Power	锦衣之下	Yuan Jinxia		
2020	The Eight	民初奇人传	Gua Daoren		
2020	Go Ahead	以家人之名	Li Jianjian		
2020	Dear Mayang Street	亲爱的麻洋街	Ma Xiaoxiao		
2021	The Sword and the Brocade	锦心似玉	Luo Shiyi Niang		
2021	Faith Makes Great	理想照耀中国	Wang Huiwu	Segment: "Song of Youth"	
2021	New Generation	我们的新时代	Huang Siqi	Story 5: "Because I Have A Home"	
2022	Master of My Own	请叫我总监	Ning Meng		
2022	Our Times	我们这十年	Li Xinyao	Segment: "Where My Heart Belongs"	
2022	Flight to You	向风而行	Cheng Xiao		
2023	Road Home	归路	Gui Xiao		
2024	As Beautiful as You	你比星光美丽	Ji Xing		
2024	Brocade Odyssey	蜀锦人家	Ji Yingying		
2025	The Unclouded Soul	逍遥	Xiao Yao		
2026	My Destiny	我和我的命	Fang Wanzhi		
2026	Against the Current	兰香如故	Xu Lanxiang / Shen Jialan		
TBA	Love Ends Suffering	赤焰	Ji Sanmei		

=== Variety show ===
Year	English title	Chinese title	Role	Notes/Ref.
2020	Little Forest	奇妙小森林	Cast member	

== Discography ==
Year	English title	Chinese title	Album	Notes/Ref.
2016	"Dearest Classmate"	亲爱的，同学	With You OST	
2017	"Dearest"	亲爱的	The Fox's Summer OST	
2017	"Loving You In A Good Weather"	爱上你的好天气	My Mr. Mermaid OST	with Xiong Ziqi
2017	"Sweetness at the Tip of the Mouth"	嘴角的甜	Faceoff OST	
2019	"This Summer"	今夏	Under The Power OST	
2020	"I am Here"	我在	Dear Mayang Street OST	with Niu Junfeng
2020	"Like a Breeze"		Go Ahead OST	

== Awards and nominations ==
Year	Award	Category	Nominated work	Result	Ref.
2016	22nd Huading Awards	Best New Actress	The Whirlwind Girl	Won	
2016	iQIYI Screaming Night	Most Promising Actress	With You	Won	
2016	FUNS Yixia Mobile Video Festival	Star of the Year	—N/a	Won	
2017	2nd Asia New Media Film Festival	Best Actress (Web series)	The Fox's Summer	Won	
2017	2nd Golden Guduo Media Awards	Best Actress (Web series)	The Fox's Summer	Won	
2017	中国银川互联网 电影节 Yinchuan Internet Film Festival	Best Actress	With You	Won	
2017	inStyle iLady Icon Awards 度偶像盛典	Popular Female Artist	—N/a	Won	
2017	风时尚盛典 iFeng Fashion Choice	Most Popular Icon	—N/a	Won	
2020	7th The Actors of China Award Ceremony	Best Actress (Web series)	—N/a	Nominated	
2020	精品风格盛典 Style Gala	Most Promising Actress Award	—N/a	Won	
2020	时尚先生 盛典 MAHB Fashion Festival	Breakthrough Artist of the Year	—N/a	Won	
2020	30th China TV Golden Eagle Award	Audience's Choice for Actress	—N/a	Nominated	
2020	iQIYI Scream Night	Acclaimed Actor	Under the Power	Won	
2020	29th Huading Award	Best Actress (Ancient Drama)	Under the Power	Won	
2020	29th Huading Award	Best Actress (Modern Drama)	Go Ahead	Nominated	
2020	29th Huading Award	Best Actress	Go Ahead	Nominated	
2020	29th Huading Award	Top Ten Favorite Actors	Go Ahead	Won	
2020	3rd Poison Eye Entertainment Conference	Favorite Actress	Go Ahead	Won	
2020	两影盛典 Internet Film Festival	Best Female Actress	Go Ahead	Won	
2021	27th Shanghai Television Festival	Best Actress	Go Ahead	Nominated	
2021	People's Daily Digital Communication and Fusion Screen Ceremony	Dynamic Actor	Go Ahead	Won	
2021	People's Daily Digital Communication and Fusion Screen Ceremony	Rising Power Actor	Go Ahead	Won	
2021	抖音星动之夜 Douyin Star Motion Night	Expressive Actor	Go Ahead	Won	
2021	5th Golden Bud Network Film and Television Festival	Best Actress	—N/a	Won	
2021	国剧盛典 National Opera Festival	Leaping Young Actress	—N/a	Won	
2021	2020 微博之夜 Weibo Night	Weibo Enterprising Artist	—N/a	Won	
2023	CMG's First Annual Chinese TV Series Ceremony	Breakthrough Actress	Flight to You	Won	
