= Sound (disambiguation) =

Sound is an audible mechanical wave propagating through matter, or the perception of such waves by the brain.

Sound or Sounds may also refer to:

== Geography ==
- Sound (geography), a large ocean inlet, or a narrow ocean channel between two bodies of land
- Sound, Cheshire
- Sound, Lerwick in Shetland
- Sound Heath, an area of common land in Sound, Cheshire
- Milford Sound, a fjord in the South Island of New Zealand
- Øresund or Öresund, commonly known in English as the Sound, is a strait which forms the Danish–Swedish border, separating Zealand (Denmark) from Scania (Sweden).

== Arts, entertainment, and media ==
=== Literature ===
- "Sounds" (short story), a short story by Vladimir Nabokov
- Klänge (English translation: Sounds), a 1912 book by Russian expressionist artist Wassily Kandinsky

=== Music ===
==== Groups ====
- Sounds (band), a Greek 1960s pop band (1963-1971)
- The Sound (band), a defunct English post-punk band (from 1979 to 1988)
- The Sounds, a Swedish indie-rock band (formed 1999)

==== Albums ====
- Sound (Dreadzone album), a 2001 studio album by the British fusion band Dreadzone
- Sound (Roscoe Mitchell album), a 1966 studio album by the American jazz saxophonist Roscoe Mitchell
- Sounds!, a 1966 album by guitarist Jack Marshall and percussionist Shelly Manne
- Sounds (Spare Snare album), a 2018 album by Scottish lofi band Spare Snare

==== Genres ====
- Sound (cumbia), a Chilean musical genre similar to tecnocumbia
- Sound, a music subgenre or "scene", such as the Nashville sound

==== Other uses in music ====
- "Sound" (song), a 1991 single by the English rock band James
- Soundtrack, the recorded sound accompanying a visual medium such as a motion picture, television show, or video game
- "The Sound", a song by Swans from Soundtracks for the Blind

=== Television ===
- Sound (TV series), a BBC programme featuring current popular music of different genres, aired between 2007 and 2009
- Sounds (TV series), an Australian music television series of the 1970s and 1980s

=== Other uses in arts, entertainment, and media ===
- Sounds (magazine), a defunct British music weekly newspaper, published between 1970 and 1991
- Soundwave (Transformers), one of the Decepticons in The Transformers universe
- BBC Sounds, an audio streaming and download service

== Sports ==
- Austin Sound, an American women's gridiron football team
- Memphis Sounds, a defunct basketball team of the American Basketball Association
- Nashville Sounds, a Minor League Baseball team in the International League of Triple-A
- Seattle Sounders, an American professional soccer club. Also, the name of two now defunct professional clubs.
- Sound FC (women), a current Women's Premier Soccer League team.
- Sound FC (men), an American soccer team.

== Other uses ==
- Sound (medical instrument), an instrument for probing and dilating passages within the body
- Sound (nautical), a verb meaning to take depth readings of fluids in a tank or around a ship
- Sound (sex toy), a sex toy designed to be inserted through the urethra of the penis for sexual pleasure
- Sound, the act of diving by a whale
- Sound, another term for a swim bladder
- Soundness, a logical term meaning that an argument is valid and its premises are true
- Speech sound or phone, a speech segment analyzed below the phonemic level

== See also ==
- Soundz (born 1989), American musician
- Audio (disambiguation)
- Soundwave (disambiguation)
- The Sound (disambiguation)
