= Chen Xiang =

Chinese pop singer and actor

- 陈翔
- Born: Chen Xiang; 13 December 1989 (age 36); Tianshui, Gansu, China
- Other name: Sean Chen
- Education: Sichuan College of Culture and Arts
- Occupations: Actor; Singer; Songwriter
- Years active: 2010–present
- Height: 176 cm (5 ft 9 in)

Chinese name
- Simplified Chinese: 陈翔
- Traditional Chinese: 陳翔
Transcriptions
Standard Mandarin
- Hanyu Pinyin: Chén Xiáng
- Musical career
- Also known as: Sean Xiang
- Genres: Mandopop
- Instrument: Vocals
- Label: EE-Media
- Website: Chen Xiang's Blog

Chen Xiang (born 13 December 1989), also known as Sean Chen, is a Chinese pop singer and actor. He participated in the nationwide singing contest Super Boy in 2010. In 2011, he released his first album Confession. He is also known for starring in the youth sports drama The Whirlwind Girl.

== Discography ==
=== Albums ===
Year	English title	Chinese title
2013	Float	漂
2014	Reborn to Sing	破茧而声

=== Extended plays ===
Year	English title	Chinese title
2011	Confession	初告白
2016	Whirlwind	旋风

=== Singles ===
Year	English title	Chinese title	Album	Notes
2010	"Fireworks"	烟火	My Stage	
2013	"Hero's Sigh"	英雄嘆	Hero OST	
2014	"That Era"	那一世	Scarlet Heart 2 OST	
2014	"Migration"	洄游	Lady's House OST	
2014	"Ask the World"	問世間	Romance of the Condor Heroes OST	
2015	"Hot Blood"	热血	Hot Blood Band OST	
2016	"Cannot Be Reached"	到不了	The Adventure for Love OST	
2016	"Only Friends"	只是朋友	The Whirlwind Girl 2 OST	
2017	"Bringing You Away"	帶你走	Love & Life & Lie OST	
2017	"The Tomorrow We Promised"	說好到明天	The Magic Star OST	
2017	"Crazed"	轻狂	Above the Clouds OST	
2017	"Chess Piece"	如棋	Rule the World OST	
2018	"Love Is Too Frivolous"	爱太轻狂	A Step into The Past OST	
2019	"Are You Doing Fine"	你还过得好吗	Hope All is Well with Us OST	
2019	"Little Boat"	小船	Hope All is Well with Us OST	

== Filmography ==
=== Film ===
Year	English title	Chinese title	Role	Notes
2012	Somebody to Love	我们约会吧	Zhang Xinran	
2015	Hot Blood Band	热血男人帮	Zhao Qun	

=== Television series ===
Year	English title	Chinese title	Role	Notes
2001	Hello Summer	夏日甜心	Ah Fei	
2012	Secret Angel	秘密天使	Han Shiying	
2013	Runaway Sweetheart	落跑甜心	Dan Hanfei	
2013	Hero	英雄	Zhan Ru	
2013	Ex	我的极品是前任	Mou Nanzhi	
2014	Scarlet Heart 2	步步惊情	Huang Di	
2014	Lady's House	淑女之家	Han Wenliang	
2014	Cosmetology High	美人制造	Wu Minzhi	
2014	The Romance of the Condor Heroes	神雕侠侣	Lu Zhanyuan	Special appearance
2015	Love Weaves Through a Millennium	相爱穿梭千年	Wang Mang	
2015	The Whirlwind Girl	旋风少女	Fan Tinghao	
2016	The Adventure For Love	寻找爱的冒险	Bai Zhou	
2016	The Whirlwind Girl 2	旋风少女第二季	Fan Tinghao	
2016	Shuttle Love Millennium	相爱穿梭千年2：月光下的交换		Cameo
2017	Magic Star	奇星记之鲜衣怒马少年时	Bai Ze	
2018	A Step into the Past	寻秦记	Xiang Shaolong	
2018	Meet in Youth, Love in Foods	像我们一样年轻	Gao Xing	
2018	I'm Not an Agent	我不是特工	Xue Yunjin	
2018	Because I Love You	因为爱你	Liu Ke	
TBA	The Mysterious Team	天枢之契约行者	Tang Tianyi	
TBA	Dear One	亲爱的孩子	Cao Qingyun	

=== Variety show ===
Year	English title	Chinese title	Role	Notes
2017	The Inn	亲爱的·客栈	Cast member	Season 1
2019	The Inn	亲爱的·客栈	Cast member	Season 3

== Awards ==
Year	Award	Category	Nominated work	Ref.
2011	Top Chinese Music Chart Breakthrough New Artist Awards	Newcomer of the Year	—N/a	
2011	Top Chinese Music Chart Breakthrough New Artist Awards	Best New Singer-Songwriter	—N/a	
2011	CNTV's Music King Hit Global Chinese Music Award	Most Popular Male Singer	—N/a	
2011	CNTV's Music King Hit Global Chinese Music Award	Most Promising Singer	—N/a	
2012	Beijing Pop Music Awards	Songs of the Year	"Confession"	
2012	Beijing Pop Music Awards	Most Popular Male Newcomer	—N/a	
2012	ERC Chinese Top Ten Awards	Newcomer Award	—N/a	
2012	Music Radio China Top Chart Awards	Most Popular Male Newcomer (Mainland China)	—N/a	
2013	Chinese Campus Art Glory Festival	Most Popular Male Singer	—N/a	
2014	Music Radio China Top Chart Awards	Song of the Year	"Search"	
2014	Music Radio China Top Chart Awards	Campus Favorite Award (Solo)	—N/a	
2014	Ku Music Asian Music Awards	Best EP	Float	
2015	Top Chinese Music Awards	Most Popular EP	Reborn to Sing	
2017	Top Chinese Music Awards	Best Crossover Idol	—N/a	
2017	Men's UNO YOUNG Awards	Most Influential Artiste	—N/a	
