= Niu Junfeng =

Chinese actor

- Born: 1 December 1992 (age 33); China
- Education: National Academy of Chinese Theatre Arts
- Occupation: Actor
- Years active: 2002–present
- Agent: TH Entertainment

Chinese name
- Traditional Chinese: 牛駿峰
- Simplified Chinese: 牛骏峰
Transcriptions

Niu Junfeng (Chinese: 牛骏峰; born 1 December 1992), is a Chinese actor and singer. He learnt Peking opera since he was young, and later received direct admission to National Academy of Chinese Theatre Arts. Niu debuted as a child actor at the age of ten. He successfully made a transition to an adult actor with his role as a young and rebellious teenager in the television series You Are My Brother. He expanded his acting range with a role as a mentally-challenged youth in the film The Dance of Summer (2013).

== Early life and education ==
Niu was born in Beijing, China. He learnt Peking opera when he was young, and later received direct admission to National Academy of Chinese Theatre Arts.

== Career ==
Niu debuted as a child actor at the age of ten, in the movie Jia You Jiao Che. Some of his notable roles in his early acting career was in the shemo television series Prelude of Lotus Lantern as young Yang Jian, and a prominent role in the popular sitcom Home with Kids 4.

Niu successfully made a transition to an adult actor with his role as a young and rebellious teenager in the television series You Are My Brother. He further expanded his acting range with a role as a mentally-challenged youth in the film The Dance of Summer .

In 2014, Niu became recognized for his role as "Xiao Man" in the war romance drama Battle of Changsha. The same year, he starred in the family drama He and His Sons alongside Zhang Guoli. He then starred in the period drama Take The Wrong Car, and received positive reviews for his role as an aspiring musician.

In 2016, Niu successfully broke into the mainstream with supporting role as Yu Banshan in the hit romance comedy drama Love O2O. The following year, Niu played a supporting role in the popular historical romance drama Princess Agents, which led to increased recognition for the actor.

In 2018, Niu played his first leading role in the youth campus drama Your Highness, The Class Monitor. He also played the male lead in the youth film Born to Be Wild.

In 2019, Niu starred in the music romance drama The Brightest Star in the Sky as a talented singer who suffers numerous setbacks. The same year, he starred in the espionage drama Fearless Whispers as a patriotic youth, and youth period drama Dear Mayang Street.

On 5 August 2020, it was confirmed that Li Landi will be starring opposite Niu in Chess Love.

Niu starred as the town's resident musician in the slice-of-life drama Meet Yourself in 2023. He also sung one of the drama's OST, Wind (风).

== Filmography ==
=== Film ===
Year	English title	Chinese title	Role	Notes
2002		家有轿车	Xiao Liang	
2003		四一班	Gao Zhuang	
2005	Magic Trip	童话西游	Buddah	
2006		心结	Guan Xin	
2006	The Dream of My Family	亲亲一家人	Zhang Bo	
2008		武术班	Dou Yuan	
2008	I Am Fans	我是粉丝	Cong Wen	
2009	The Emperor Fu Xi	人皇伏羲	Hao Ying	
2011		少年向上	Xiao Shang	
2012	Judge Zhan	南平红荔	Fang Chao	
2013	The Dance of Summer	夏天的拉花	Zhou Xiangyang	
2018	Born to Be Wild	说走就走之毕业旅行	Chen Xiao	
2018		无敌神男	Tao Fei	
2021	Wish Dragon	许愿神龙	Din Song	Mandarin dub

=== Television series ===
Year	English title	Chinese title	Role	Notes
2004	We Are All Friends	我们都是好朋友	Yu Lei	
2006		变身战士阿龙	Pang Hou	
2006	Vigorous Life	无限生机	Yuan Yuan	
2006	I Want a Home	我想有个家	Xiao Wei	
2007		野百合也有春天	Nie Feng	
2007	Home with Kids 4	家有儿女4	Qian Zhuangzhuang	
2008	e-Times	网络年代	Meng Xiang	
2009		铁血少年	He Jiefang	
2009	Prelude of Lotus Lantern	宝莲灯前传	young Yang Jian	
2010	You Are My Brother	你是我兄弟	young Ma Xuejun	
2011		大丽家的往事	young Wei Dong	
2012		营盘镇警事	Fan Xiaopeng	
2014	Battle of Changsha	战长沙	Hu Xiangjiang (Xiao Man)	
2014	He and His Sons	半路父子	Luo Xiaolie	
2016	Take The Wrong Car	搭错车	Shi Junmai	
2016	Go! Goal! Fighting!	旋风十一人	Wang Jingke	
2016	Love O2O	微微一笑很倾城	Yu Banshan	
2016	The Flame of Youth	尖锋之烈焰青春	Liu Yaoen	
2017	Little Valentine	小情人	Wen Rushi	
2017	Princess Agents	楚乔传	Yuan Song	
2017	Red Gate Brothers	红门兄弟	Gao Dawei	
2018	The Legend of Jade Sword	莽荒纪	Mu Zishuo	
2019	The Brightest Star in the Sky	夜空中最闪亮的星	Yu Zirui	
2019	Your Highness, The Class Monitor	班长“殿下”	Gu Zi chen	
2020	Wu Xin: The Monster Killer III	无心法师III	He Jingming	
2020	Twenty Your Life On	二十不惑	Zhao Youxiu	
2020	Dear Mayang Street	亲爱的麻洋街	Yi Dongdong	
2020	Fearless Whispers	隐秘而伟大	Zhao Zhiyong	
2021	Chess Love	舍我其谁	Sheng Jingchu	Main role
2021	The Priceless	婆婆的镯子	Shi Da Yan	
2021	Faith Makes Great	理想照耀中国	Wang Jia Wen [Niu Kou]	
2022	Twenty Your Life On 2	二十不惑2	Zhao Youxiu	Guest role
2022	Great Miss D	了不起的D小姐	Lin Mosheng	Main role
2023	Meet Yourself	去有风的地方	Hu Youyu	Support role
2024	Best Choice Ever	承欢记	Xin Jialiang	Guest role
2025	A Love Never Lost	人生若如初见		Support role
2026	Against the Current	兰香如故	Han Liang	Support role

=== Variety show ===
Year	English title	Chinese title	Role	Notes
2018	The Sound	声临其境	Cast member	
2019	Everybody Stand By	演员请就位	Contestant	Final winner

== Discography ==
Year	English title	Chinese title	Album	Notes
2016	"My Generation"	我的时代	Go! Goal! Fighting! OST	
2017	"Secretly Attack"	暗算	—N/a	

== Awards and nominations ==
Year	Event	Category	Nominated work	Result	Ref.
2019	iFeng Fashion Choice Awards	Most Popular Male Celebrity	—N/a	Won	
2019	Tencent Entertainment White Paper	Most Promising Variety Artist	Everybody Stand By	Won	
