= Avatar (2004 film) =

- Directed by: Kuo Jian Hong
- Written by: Christopher Hatton
- Produced by: Kuo Jian Hong; Anthony Fu; Christopher Hatton
- Starring: Genevieve O'Reilly; Joan Chen; David Warner; Wang Luoyong; William Sanderson
- Cinematography: Philipp Timme
- Edited by: Carroll Timothy O'Meara; David Flores
- Music by: Jonathan Price
- Production company: Cinemancer Pte Ltd.
- Distributed by: Force Entertainment
- Release dates: 15 September 2004 (Russia); 7 March 2005 (Singapore)
- Running time: 103 minutes
- Country: Singapore
- Language: English
- Budget: $3.6 million

Avatar (Chinese: 流放化身) is a 2004 English-language Singaporean science fiction action film directed by Kuo Jian Hong and written by Christopher Hatton.

== Plot ==
In 2019, nearly everyone is identified by an implanted microchip and connected to the cybernet. Criminals use fake chips, known as "SIMs" (Simulated Identity iMplants). Bounty hunter Dash MacKenzie is looking for a man who bought a SIM, and uncovers a game played by corporation heads to manipulate society.

== Cast ==
- Genevieve O'Reilly as Dash MacKenzie
- Joan Chen as Madame Ong
- David Warner as Joseph Lau
- Wang Luoyong as Officer Victor Huang
- William Sanderson as Riley
- Lim Kay Siu as Julius
- Kumar as Zai
- Richard Low as Uncle Ban
- Michael de Mesa as Davinder Sandhu
- Gerald Chew as Edward Chan
- T. Sasitharan as Minister
- Kate Wilson as Lt. Crowley

== Production ==
Avatar was the first English-language film produced in Singapore. Filming took place in Singapore from April to May 2001 with the working title Avatar Exile.

== Release ==
The film was first released on Russian television on 15 September 2004 before seeing a theatrical release in Singapore on 7 March 2005. Under the title Matrix Hunter, Pand Co. Ltd. issued a DVD on 7 June 2005 and, as Cyber Wars, New Line Home Entertainment released the film on region 1 DVD on 11 April 2006.

== Reception ==
The film received generally negative reviews. Cheah Ui-Hoon of The Business Times rated the film C−. Ong Sor Fern of The Straits Times gave the film a negative review.
