= Li Landi =

Chinese actress

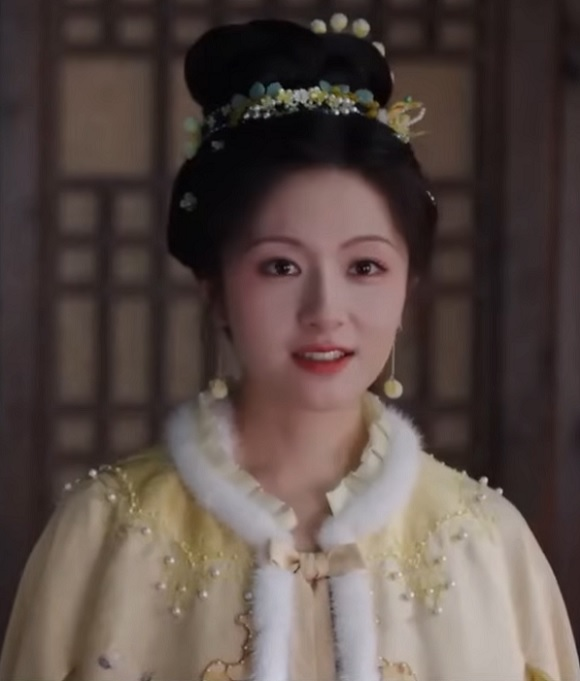
- Li in 2024
- Born: 2 September 1999 (age 26); Beijing, China
- Other names: Landy Li, Li Dahe, Xiaoxi
- Education: Beijing Xuanwu The Hui People Elementary School; High School Affiliated to Beijing Normal University
- Alma mater: Central Academy of Drama
- Occupations: Actress; model
- Years active: 2009–present
- Agent: Tangren Media
- Simplified Chinese: 李兰迪
- Hanyu Pinyin: Lǐ Lándí

Li Landi (Chinese: 李兰迪; born 2 September 1999), also known as Landy Li, is a Chinese actress, singer and model of Hui ethnicity. She also starred in 2019 Chinese film Adoring. She is best known for her roles in the dramas My Huckleberry Friends (2017), Wu Xin: The Monster Killer 2 (2017), and The Starry Love (2023).

== Early life and education ==
Li Landi, born in Beijing on September 2, 1999, in a Chinese Hui family.

In 2018, Li entered the Central Academy of Drama with the second highest score of this school in the National Higher Education Entrance Examination.

== Career ==
In 2009, 10-year-old Li made her film debut in Who Did You Lose To (爱你输给了谁) and thus set foot in the film and television industry. In 2013, she starred in the action film Switch. In 2015, she co-starred with Zhu Zixiao in the urban love drama Tea Love. In 2016, she portrayed Yaoyao, a kind girl in the urban romance drama Far Away Love. In June, she won the most potential child actress award for her performance in the inspirational children's movie Teenager King of Chess.

Li first gained attention with her role in the family drama Chinese Style Relationship (2016). The following year, she took on lead roles in the youth drama All About Secrets and Wu Xin: The Monster Killer 2, which gained her increased recognition. Li subsequently appeared in the campus drama My Huckleberry Friends as Yu Zhouzhou and romance drama Never Gone as the younger version of the female protagonist Su Yunjin, receiving positive reviews for her performance.

In 2019, Li starred in the historical romance drama Dreaming Back to the Qing Dynasty. The same year she starred in the romance comedy film Adoring. On October 17, 2019, Forbes China listed Li under their 30 Under 30 Asia 2019 list which consisted of 30 influential people under 30 years old who have had a substantial effect in their fields.

In June 2020, Li was cast in youth drama Don't Disturb My Study as the main lead, Nan Xiangwan alongside Lai Kuan-lin as Lin Xiaoran.

On 5 August 2020, it was confirmed that Li will be starring opposite Niu Junfeng in GO Into Your Heart.

== Filmography ==
=== Film ===
Year	English title	Chinese title	Role	Notes	Ref.
2011		爱你输给了谁	Lele		
2012	Young Min Ziqian	少年闵子骞	Lian'er		
2013	Switch	富春山居图	Guihua (young)		
2013	Silent Witness	全民目击	Lin Mengmeng (young)		
2014	Teenager King of Chess	少年棋王	Lan Yu'er		
2016	Mysterious Face 2	枕边有张脸2	Wu Xitian (young)		
2018	The Secret of Immortal Code	伊阿索密码	Lin Yuqi		
2019	Adoring	宠爱	Gao Mengmeng		

=== Television series ===
Year	English title	Chinese title	Role	Notes	Ref.
2011	Sword Heroes' Fate	剑侠情缘之藏剑山庄	Qi Yue (young)		
2012		外姓兄弟	Sheng Nan (young)		
2012	Come Home	亲爱的，回家	An Qi		
2013		妈妈圈的流言蜚语	Pan Xiaoxiao		
2014	Lady's House	淑女之家	Zeng Lingge (young)		
2014		汉阳造	Jiang Xue (young)		
2015	Tea Love	闪亮茗天	Tang Jiajia		
2016	The Link	天伦	Pei Baozhu (young)		
2016	Far Away Love	远得要命的爱情	Yaoyao		
2016	Chinese Style Relationship	中国式关系	Ma Xiaoyi		
2017	All About Secrets	秘果	Yu Chizi		
2017	Song Yao My Father	宋耀如·父亲	Soong Ching-ling		
2017	Wu Xin: The Monster Killer 2	无心法师II	Su Tao		
2017	My Huckleberry Friends	你好，旧时光	Yu Zhouzhou		
2018	Never Gone	原来你还在这里	Su Yunjin (young)		
2019	Dreaming Back to the Qing Dynasty	梦回	Ming Wei		
2021	Don't Disturb My Study	别想打扰我学习	Nan Xiangwan		
2021	Faith Makes Great	理想照耀中国	Urna	Chapter Our Ulaan Mochir	
2021	Go into Your Heart	舍我其谁	Cheng Liao		
2023	The Starry Love	星落凝成糖	Liguang Yetan		
2023	Enlighten Your Life	许你万家灯火	Meng Xiaowei		
2023	All the Way to the Sun	一路朝阳	Li Mujia		
2023	The Eight Fairies	蓬莱八仙	Xiao Cao		
2024	Angels Fall Sometimes	谢谢你温暖我	An Zhique		
2024	Love of Nirvana	流水迢迢	Jiang Ci		
2025	Filter	滤镜	Su Chengcheng		
2025	Coroner's Diary	朝雪录	Qin Wan		
2025	The Miracles	奇迹	Wu Xueqing / Jiang Xiaolan		
2026	Take a Nap	海岛舒服日志	Wang Zhihui		
2026	Bloom Life	喀什恋歌	Xia Zi		
TBA	Su Ji	苏记	Su Lili		
TBA	A Panorama of Rivers and Mountains	千里江山图	Ye Tao		
TBA	Guardians of The Lands	山河表里		Cameo	
TBA	The Way Home	欢聚	Wu Buwei		

=== Variety show ===
Year	English title	Chinese title	Role	Notes/Ref.
2019	The Inn	亲爱的·客栈	Cast member	

== Discography ==
Year	English title	Chinese title	Album	Notes
2019	"Adoring"	宠爱	Adoring OST	

== Awards ==
Year	Award	Category	Nominated work	Result	Ref.
2016	Qinghai Xining Environmental Protection Children's Film Festival	Most Promising Child Actress	Shao Nian Qi Wang	Won	
2017	7th iQIYI All-Star Carnival	Newcomer Award	My Huckleberry Friends	Won	
2018	10th China TV Drama Awards	New Generation Artist	—N/a	Won	
2019	iFeng Fashion Choice Awards	Fashion Popularity of the Year	—N/a	Won	
