= The Fox's Summer =

2017 Chinese drama

- Also known as: Fox Falls in Love
- Genre: Romantic comedy
- Based on: When the President Falls in Love by Shen Cangmei
- Written by: Shen Cangmei; You Er
- Directed by: Yu Zhongzhong
- Starring: Jiang Chao; Tan Songyun
- Opening theme: together
- Country of origin: China
- Original language: Mandarin
- No. of seasons: 2
- No. of episodes: 44

Production
- Producers: He Houze; Nina
- Production companies: Penguin Pictures; Vision Power; Kangxi Media; Perfect World Pictures; Yongzhou Pictures Corp

Original release
- Network: Tencent
- Release: 5 April 2017

The Fox's Summer (Chinese: 狐狸的夏天) is a 2017 Chinese television drama based on the online novel titled When the President Falls in Love (当总裁恋爱时) by Shen Cangmei. The drama received praise for its witty dialogue and unique storyline, and ranked atop the ratings chart.

== Synopsis ==
Gu Chengze, the adopted son of the Gu family, is the CEO of Gu Mall Corporation. Mrs. Gu wishes for her biological grandson, Gu Jinyu, to take over the company, and Chengze is tasked with guiding the rightful heir towards becoming a respectable businessman. During this time, he meets fashion designer Li Yanshu and discovers that she is Jinyu's ex-girlfriend. He decides to hire her on board to motivate Jinyu, who still harbors feelings for Yanshu. The plan works and Jinyu decides to join the company to pursue her. When Mrs. Gu finds out about Jinyu's feelings for Yanshu, she is livid and tells Chengze to separate them. This creates an opportunity for Chengze and Yanshu to get closer to each other, and they fall in love. With the help of Yanshu, Chengze overcomes many difficult situations. Jinyu, after undergoing life-changing experiences, also matures and successfully takes over the company and finds real love.

== Broadcast ==
Season	Premiere date	Episode count
Season 1	5 April 2017	21
Season 2	4 May 2017	23
Season 3	TBA	TBA

== Cast ==
- Jiang Chao as Gu Chengze (The Rabbit), CEO of a company who is a human lie detector and has obsessive–compulsive disorder.
- Tan Songyun as Li Yanshu (The Fox), a fashion designer and pathological liar. She is independent and adapts well to any situations.
- Daniel Zhang Xin as Gu Jinyu, an easygoing and flamboyant man who does not take work seriously. He only loves his first girlfriend, Yanshu.
- Wang Yanzhi as Han Junyao, the self-centered heiress of Han Corporation who has liked to pick on Yanshu since their high school days.
- Dong Hui as Mrs. Gu
- Ji Xiaobing as Gao Yang
- Zui Ju as Qiao Na

== Production ==
Kim Tae-hwan was originally cast as the male lead, but was replaced by Jiang Chao due to China's ban on Korean-Chinese co-production and celebrities.

== Soundtrack ==
The Fox's Summer – Original Television Soundtrack (【狐狸的夏天】电视剧原声音乐大碟)
No.	Title	Music	Length
1.	"Be Together (在一起)"
2.	"Summer Time (时光的夏天)"
3.	"My Dear (亲爱的)"	Tan Songyun
4.	"Darling Darling"	Cong Rong Ze Meng and Tian Xiaotong
5.	"Love is Lost (爱，迷路了)"	by Tian Xiaotong

== Awards and nominations ==
Year	Award	Category	Nominated work	Result	Ref.
2017	2nd Asia New Media Film Festival	Most Popular Actor (Web series)	Jiang Chao	Won	
2017	2nd Asia New Media Film Festival	Best Actress (Web series)	Tan Songyun	Won	
2017	2nd Golden Guduo Media Awards	Top Ten Web Series	The Fox's Summer	Won	
2017	2nd Golden Guduo Media Awards	Best Actress (Web series)	Tan Songyun	Won	
