= The Whirlwind Girl =

2015 Chinese sport series

- Season 1: Official Poster
- Also known as: Tornado Girl; Taekwondo Girl
- Genre: Teen; Sports; Romance; Comedy
- Based on: Tornado Girl by Ming Xiaoxi
- Written by: Ming Xiaoxi; Zhu Ming
- Directed by: Cheng Zhichao
- Starring: Season 1: Hu Bingqing; Yang Yang; Chen Xiang; Bai Jingting; Zhao Yuanyuan; Tan Songyun; Leo Wu; Jiang Yiyi; Season 2: An Yuexi; Ji Chang-wook
- Opening theme: Burning Youth by He Jie
- Ending theme: That Distance by Chen Chusheng
- Composers: Zhu Jintai; Lee Daliang; Guo Chao; Ouyang YiLu; Wu Fan
- Country of origin: China
- Original language: Mandarin
- No. of seasons: 2
- No. of episodes: 68

Production
- Executive producers: Zhang Huali; Li Hao; Zhou Xiong; Zhang Ruobo
- Producers: He Jin; Zhou Dan
- Production locations: China; South Korea
- Running time: 35 minutes
- Production companies: Mango Media; Grand Media

Original release
- Network: Hunan TV
- Release: 7 July 2015 – 15 September 2016

The Whirlwind Girl (Chinese: 旋风少女) is a 2015 Chinese martial arts based television series starring Hu Bingqing and Yang Yang in lead roles. It is adapted from the Chinese novel of the same name by Ming Xiaoxi. On 7 July 2015, it was released on Hunan TV. In 2016, the success of the show led to a second season The Whirlwind Girl 2 starring An Yuexi and Ji Chang-wook.

== Synopsis ==
Season 1: Qi Baicao (Hu Bingqing), passionate about the martial arts sport Yuanwudao since childhood, loses her parents in a fire and is adopted by Qu Xiangnan, a disgraced former world champion. Determined and righteous, she trains hard to become a professional Yuanwudao athlete, aiming to clear her teacher’s name. Along her journey, she meets loyal friendly senior Ruo Bai (Yang Yang), caring but mysterious medic Yu Chuyuan (Bai Jingting), playful Fang Tinghao (Chen Xiang) and fierce rival Fang Tingyi (Zhao Yuanyuan).

Season 2: After senior Ruo Bai’s leaves, everyone at Songbai Dojo is deeply affected, especially Baicao (An Yuexi), who tried to stay strong for the team. To promote Yuanwudao, the American Fengyun Dojo organizes a beauty contest. Baicao qualifies for the city youth competition, where she meets Coach Shen Xi. Meanwhile, Yu Chuyuan, staying in America, arranges for a mysterious man, Chang An (Ji Chang-wook), to become the coach at Songbai Dojo.

== Seasons ==
Season	Episodes	Originally aired	
Season	Episodes	Premiere	Finale
1	32	7 July 2015	26 August 2015
2	36	20 July 2016	15 September 2016

== Cast ==
=== Main: Season 1 ===
- Hu Bingqing as Qi Baicao: A humble, hardworking girl who loves Yuanwudao, she rises from white belt to champion, earning the title “The Whirlwind Girl.”
- Yang Yang as Ruo Bai: Baicao’s stoic yet kind senior at Song Bai, he sees her potential early on and quietly supports her journey. Though he hides his love for her, she later realizes he holds a special place in her heart.
- Chen Xiang as Fang Tinghao: An international Yuanwudao champion, confident and flirtatious but kind-hearted, he falls for Baicao after admiring her skill. Though he loves her deeply, she sees him only as a respected friend and senior.
- Bai Jingting as Yu Chuyuan: A former Yuanwudao champion turned medic, he is calm and humble. He falls for Baicao, who initially admires him but later sees him only as a close friend. His reason for leaving the sport is revealed later.
- Zhao Yuanyuan as Fang Tingyi: Tinghao’s sister, and Yuanwudao champion, jealous of Baicao but later supports her. They humble each other, sharing respect through rivalry.

=== Main: Season 2 ===
- An Yuexi as Qi Baicao: After her mentor leaves, she stays strong and joins a Fengyun Dojo beauty contest to qualify for the city youth competition, where she meets Coach Shen Xi.
- Ji Chang-wook as Chang An: The former youngest Yuanwudao master, betrayed and injured, he becomes Song Bai’s coach. He trains Baicao for revenge but falls in love with her.

=== Supporting ===
==== Song Bai Yuanwudao Center ====
- Leo Wu as Hu Yifeng: Ruo Bai’s lazy-looking but talented dorm mate, he often bickers with Xiaoying and eventually falls for her. A good friends with Baicao.
- Tan Songyun as Fan Xiaoying: Baicao’s cheerful best friend who supports her always. She first likes Ruo Bai but later falls for Yifeng, with whom she often bickers.
- Li Ze as Wu Xiuda: He initially disliked Baicao but soon supports her and becomes a close friends, hunting a crush on Baicao.
- Yu Haoyang as Wu Xiuqin: At first, she disliked Baicao, fearing she’d be replaced. But after Baicao’s support during a match, she grows to like her.
- Qie Lutong as Song Pingping: She is initially skeptical of Baicao coming to SongBai, but soon became her close friend.
- Li Ji as Yin Yin: She too was skeptical of Baicao coming to SongBai initially, but soon becomes her close friend.
- Gao Guangze as Yang Rui: He too didn't like the idea of Baicao being at SongBai, but later he becomes her close friend.
- Li Qiang as Master Yu: Master of Song Bai Yuanwudao Center and Chuyuan's adoptive father. He is a kind-hearted person and accepts Baicao as a student of SongBai at her master's request.

==== Quan Sheng Yuanwudao Center ====
- Vincent Chiao as Qu Xiangnan: Baicao’s master and Guangya’s father, a former world champion banned after a drug framing. Baicao alone believes in his innocence and fiercely defends his honor.
- Yu Tinger as Qu Guangya: Qu Xiangnan’s daughter, outwardly cold but kind, and Baicao’s caring childhood friend.
- Feng Peng as Zheng Yuanhai: Current Master of Quan Sheng Yuanwudao Center.

==== Xian Wu Yuanwudao Center ====
- Yang Tailang as Shen Bo: Ting Hao’s close friend and Baicao’s competition informant, he supports Ting Hao’s love for Baicao.
- Wang Deshun as Master Wan: Master of Xian Wu Taekwondo Center and the Fang siblings' maternal grandfather.
- Shi Xiaoqun as Shen Ning: A talented Yuanwudao coach and Guangya’s aunt, she initially dislikes Baicao for honoring Qu Xiangnan, whom she blames for her sister’s death, but later respects Baicao’s skills.

==== Chang Hai Yuanwudao Center ====
- Jiang Yiyi as Kim Min-joo: A frank and adorable South Korean Yuanwudao student who initially dislikes Baicao due to a family rivalry but later admires her.
- Zhang Xueying as Lee Eun Soo (Li En-Xiu): Chuyuan’s half-sister and Korea’s top female player, she admires Baicao and likes Tinghao. She’s undefeated by Baicao and has beaten Fang Tingyi.
- Sun Lishi as Kim Yishan: Min-joo’s father and Qu Xiangnan’s rival, rumored to have used unfair means to win the championship.
- Jang Tae-hoon as Min Shenghao: Yishan's beloved disciple. Yishan’s devoted disciple, a determined runner-up in the Youth Championship, close to Min-joo and admirer of En-xiu.
- Li Jiacheng as Min Zai

==== Others ====
- Huang Xiaolin as Mei Ling: Baicao’s first Institute match opponent, initially angry at her defeat but later becomes her friend after Baicao shows respect.
- Ma Chengcheng as Lin Feng: China’s second strongest female Yuanwudao player after Tingyi, defeated by Baicao in the quarter-finals, later becomes her friend and supporter.
- Yang Xiaodan as Xiao Ying's mother: A kind-hearted woman, who treats Baicao as her own daughter.
- Fu Jia as Xiao Ying's father
- Ma Ruojing as Pu Dongyuan, the person behind the drugs incident regarding Qu Xiangnan.
- Li Haohan as Li Yunyue: The Father of En-xiu, Yin-xiu and Chuyuan.
- Yi Ji as Shen Yuan: Qu Xiangnan's wife and Shen Ning's sister, she cared for Baicao like her own daughter and looked after her childhood but died in childbirth soon after her husband was framed.
- Xu Huiwen as Ruo Bai's mother

== Soundtrack ==
=== Season 1 ===
Title	Singer	Length
Burning Youth (Opening theme song)	He Jie	03:18
That Distance Youth (Ending theme song)	Chen Chusheng	04:36
Missing Out	Luna Yin	04:05
Overjoyed	Jin Minqi	03:19
Lucky to Meet You	Liu Ao	04:22
Forgot to Hold Your Hand	Milk Coffee	05:17
Stars	Milk Coffee	04:11
Fireworks	Chen Xiang	03:50

=== Season 2 ===
Title	Singer
Impulse (Opening Theme)	Luna Yin
Just Friends (Ending Theme Song)	Chen Xiang
The Light of Love	Ben Xi
Have You Ever Thought About This?	Xu Hao
Stars in My Dreams	Chen Chusheng
Failure	Luna Yin
I'm Not Afraid of Fighting	Idol School
Super Sentai	Idol School
The Light of Leaves	Xu Fei
If I Can	Hu Xia

== Reception ==
- Season 1: It was a commercial success, consistently maintaining the number one spot in its timeslot during its broadcast; it achieved an average viewership rating of 1.69% in CSM50 and 2.43% in Nationwide, making it one of the highest rated Chinese dramas in 2015. It garnered 2 Billion viewership on Mango TV.
- Season 2: It achieved an average viewership rating of 1.09%.

== Production ==
Season 1: Xu Jiao was originally assign to portray "Qi Baicao", however she withdrew due to health issues; later Hu Bingqing assumed the role. The filming took place from April to July 2015 in Changsha, and some scenes were shot in South Korea. It received licence to broadcast 32 episodes.

Season 2: An Yuexi replaces Hu Bingqing as the female lead "Qi Baicao", due to scheduling issues, joining the original cast alongside Ji Chang-wook. Yang Yang withdraw too citing scheduling overlap. It received licence to broadcast 36 episodes.

== Ratings ==
Highest ratings are marked in red, lowest ratings are marked in blue

- Season 1:

China Hunan TV premiere ratings (CSM50)
Episodes	Broadcast date	Ratings (%)	Audience share (%)	Rankings
1-2	July 7, 2015	1.200	5.920	1
3-4	July 8, 2015	1.159	6.189	1
5-6	July 14, 2015	1.215	6.898	1
7-8	July 15, 2015	1.501	8.064	1
9-10	July 21, 2015	1.664	8.951	1
11-12	July 22, 2015	1.778	9.507	1
13-14	July 28, 2015	1.736	9.246	1
15-16	July 29, 2015	1.733	9.068	1
17-18	August 4, 2015	1.725	9.129	1
19-20	August 5, 2015	1.781	9.111	1
21-22	August 11, 2015	1.605	8.720	1
23-24	August 12, 2015	2.000	10.089	1
25-26	August 18, 2015	1.950	10.335	1
27-28	August 19, 2015	2.150	10.940	1
29-30	August 25, 2015	1.879	10.022	1
31-32	August 26, 2015	1.904	9.371	1

Nationwide Ratings
Episodes	Broadcast date	Ratings (%)	Audience share (%)	Rankings
1-2	July 7, 2015	1.58	10.30	1
3-4	July 8, 2015	1.66	10.96	1
5-6	July 14, 2015	1.89	12.69	1
7-8	July 15, 2015	2.19	13.79	1
9-10	July 21, 2015	2.56	16.14	1
11-12	July 22, 2015	2.46	15.26	1
13-14	July 28, 2015	2.44	15.02	1
15-16	July 29, 2015	2.50	15.49	1
17-18	August 4, 2015	2.68	16.55	1
19-20	August 5, 2015	2.58	15.88	1
21-22	August 11, 2015	2.55	16.58	1
23-24	August 12, 2015	2.82	17.33	1
25-26	August 18, 2015	2.78	17.66	1
27-28	August 19, 2015	2.82	17.77	1
29-30	August 25, 2015	2.61	17.12	1
31-32	August 26, 2015	2.71	16.29	1

== Awards and nominations ==
Year	Award	Category	Work	Status	Ref.
2015	28th Golden Eagle Awards	Outstanding Television Series	Season 1	Won	
2015	China TV Drama Ceremony: Jury Award	Best New Actor	Bai Jingting	Nominated	
2016	China TV Drama Ceremony: Jury Award	Top TV Series	Season 2	Won	
2016	China TV Drama Ceremony: Jury Award	Youth Breakthrough Actor	Leo Wu	Won	
2017	22nd Huading Awards	Best Newcomer in a TV Series	Tan Songyun	Won	
