= The Unclouded Soul =

2025 Chinese television series

- Official poster
- Genre: Xianxia; Romance
- Written by: Bai Wenjun; Ding Ding
- Directed by: Xu Jizhou; Yang Yufei
- Starring: Tan Songyun; Hou Minghao
- Country of origin: China
- Original language: Mandarin
- No. of seasons: 1
- No. of episodes: 40

Production
- Executive producers: Lianghong; Wang Xiaohui
- Producers: Xu Tai; Qin Ge; An Ning; Zheng Hong
- Production location: Hengdian World Studios
- Running time: 45 minutes
- Production companies: iQIYI; Liu Bai Entertainment

Original release
- Network: iQIYI; CCTV-8; Youku; WeTV
- Release: December 27, 2025 – January 6, 2026

The Unclouded Soul (Chinese: 逍遥) is a 2025 Chinese television series starring Tan Songyun and Hou Minghao in leading roles. It aired on iQIYI, CCTV-8, Youku, and WeTV from December 27, 2025 until January 6, 2026.

On December 28, 2025, the popularity exceeded 7,500 heat index on iQIYI, and the following day, the popularity exceeded 8,000 heat index on Youku. The series has a 6.6 rating on Douban from over 14,000 users.

== Synopsis ==
For thousands of years, humans and demons have been trying to find the ancient Kunlun Mirror, which can guide them to the celestial mountain sea named "Yuli Spring", granting humans immortality and demons a thousand years of cultivation. One hundred years ago, Demon King Hong Ye (Hou Minghao) assembled all the pieces of the Kunlun Mirror for the human princess Ning'an. However, on their wedding day, Ning'an betrayed and killed him for being a demon. Hong Ye's primordial spirit survived but was badly injured. One hundred years later, he was accidentally awakened by Xiao Yao (Tan Songyun), a half-human, half-demon girl who looks exactly like Ning'an. As Xiao Yao becomes entangled with Hong Ye, the hidden past and the truth behind "Yuli Spring" gradually unfold.

== Cast and characters ==
=== Main ===
- Tan Songyun as Xiao Yao / Ning'an
  - Xiao Yao: A half-human, half-demon girl who once made a living by scamming people while pretending to be a demon hunter. Although she was born to a human couple, she carries demon blood, which makes her a half-demon. Her fate changes when she accidentally awakens the Demon King.
  - Ning'an: Princess of Human realm who betrayed and killed Hong Ye one hundred years ago.
- Hou Minghao as Hong Ye

He is the Demon King who has lived for thousands of years. One hundred years ago, he fell in love with the human princess Ning'an, who betrayed and killed him for being a demon. However, his primordial spirit survived, and one hundred years later he is awakened by Xiao Yao, a half-human, half-demon girl who looks exactly like Ning'an.

=== Supporting ===
- Wang Duo as Bing Zhu

Demon slayer and the captain of Feiyu guards who despises demons.

- Huang Jiajing as Lu Pianpian

Disciple of the Dreamshard Immortal.

- Guo Yunqi as Xiao Ming / Xiao Mu

Cat demon of the demon valley who is very loyal to the Demon King Hong Ye. After Xiao Mu died, Xiao Ming protected his soul, causing the two to share the same body.

- Li Junhao as Luo Luo
- Zhang Xiaowan as Da Li
- Li Jing as Zhi Fu
- Cui Shaohan as Ji Yan
- Xie Zecheng as Bamboo Demon
- Ye Liu as Hei Wu
- Jin Shijie as Emperor Tian Sheng

Current Emperor of the Human realm who desperately wanted to obtain the Yuli Spring to achieve immortality.

- Dai Xu as Ao Hen

One of the ancient great demons who was sealed by Hong Ye ten thousand years ago.

- Wang Sen as Qiong Qi

One of the ancient great demons who was sealed by Hong Ye ten thousand years ago.

- Hu Wei as Teng She

One of the ancient great demons who was sealed by Hong Ye ten thousand years ago.

- Liu Xingchen as Wu Heng
- Wu Yue as Jin Muqing
- Li Qian as Madame Jin
- Chen Xinhai as A Li
- Zhao Yi as Xiao Dadan, Xiao Yao's father
- Zhao Zheng as Emperor Ning An
- Tao Bao as Zi Xiu
- Meng Asai as A Li
- Wang Xinqiao as Long Yu
  - Wu Qi as older Long Yu

Previous Demon King and one of the ancient dragons.

- Wang Yifei as Long Zhi

Guest appearances

- Zhao Liying as Dreamshard Immortal

Originally a celestial maiden, she descended to earth and fell in love with a human due to her attachment to the mortal realm. Later, she collected the Kunlun Mirror for her lover, but was betrayed by him. It caused her to refine her heart into the Crystal Heart, thus becoming a spirit. She resides in the Realm of Mist and Void and desperately wants to find the Yuli Spring so that she can return to Heaven realm.

== Soundtrack ==
Part	Title		Artist	Lyricist	Composer	Notes
Part	English	Chinese	Artist	Lyricist	Composer	Notes
1.	"From Now On"	从此	Tan Songyun	Chen Xi	Dong Dong Dong	Xiao Yao's theme song
2.	"Scared It's a Dream"	怕是一场梦	Hou Minghao	Chen Xi	Dong Dong Dong	Hong Ye's theme song
3.	"Thoughts and Calamities"	念与劫	Huang Xiaoyun	Zhao Subing, Zhuang Zihan	Chen Jiayi	
4.	"Cinders"	燃烬	Jing Long	Deng Shuyue	Zhou Fujian	
5.	Mirror	镜	Duan Aojuan	Chen Xi	Chen Xi, Dong Dong Dong	
6.	"Mortal Realm Poetry"	人间辞	Xu Xinwen	Tang Aobo	Tang Aobo	
7.	"Crack"	裂	Fei Fei, Li Xinyi	Chen Xi	Dong Dong Dong	
