= Smile (2005 film) =

- Theatrical release poster
- Directed by: Jeffrey Kramer
- Written by: Jeffrey Kramer
- Produced by: Kip Konwiser
- Starring: Mika Boorem; Wang Luoyong; Beau Bridges; Cheri Oteri; Linda Hamilton; Shuai Chi; Jia Song; Jonathan Trent; Erik von Detten; Yi Ding; Sean Astin
- Cinematography: Edward J. Pei
- Edited by: Maysie Hoy
- Music by: Neil Giraldo
- Distributed by: Freestyle Releasing; Feature Films For Families
- Release date: April 8, 2005
- Running time: 107 minutes
- Countries: United States; China
- Languages: English; Mandarin

Smile is a 2005 drama film written and directed by Jeffrey Kramer.

== Plot ==
Katie and Lin are born on the same day but into different lifestyles: one in Malibu, California to a nuclear family that has to learn how to handle a growing teenager and the other into a single parent family in China with a teenager who was born with a facial deformity and suffers in isolationism.

Katie learns of a program, "Doctor's Gift", that provide world-wide, medical assistance to those in need. She learns about Lin.

Katie joins the program on one of its trips to China. Katie undergoes an attitude change while in China and on her own embarks to find Lin.

Lin's father, Daniel, brings Katie and Lin together. Lin is convinced to undergo surgery for her facial deformity. She is able to smile.

They both develop beyond the insularity of their particular world.

== Cast ==
- Mika Boorem as Katie
- Wang Luoyong as Daniel
- Beau Bridges as Steven
- Cheri Oteri as Linda
- Linda Hamilton as Bridget
- Shuai Chi as Calvin
- Jia Song as Daniel's wife
- Jonathan Trent as Ted
- Erik von Detten as Chris
- Yi Ding as Lin
- Sean Astin as Mr. Matthews
