= Hot Blood Band =

- 热血男人帮
- Directed by: Zha Muchun
- Production companies: Beijing Star Entertainment Co., Ltd; Beijing Wanmei Xingkong Media Co., Ltd; Beijing Shouying Media Co., Ltd; E Mei Film Group; Sichuan Eying Xinshengli Media Co., Ltd
- Distributed by: Shanghai Hemu Media Co., Ltd; Beijing Star Entertainment Co., Ltd
- Release date: 29 January 2015
- Running time: 100 minutes
- Country: China
- Language: Mandarin
- Box office: CN¥0.93 million

Hot Blood Band (Chinese: 热血男人帮) is a 2015 Chinese comedy film directed by Zha Muchun. It was released on 29 January 2015.

== Plot ==
Supercock, a cafe operated for many years by the same family, must close down as the neighborhood in which it offers food is undergoing gentrification and is becoming an arts colony. To make matters worse, a feeble man who works in the cafe accidentally burns the 100,000-yuan that workers loyal to the cafe raised to try to save it. Thankfully, a cynical washed-up old rocker arrives on the scene and suggests the cafe workers form a rock band, enter their band in a rock band competition, and use the prize money to save the cafe. Much hilarity ensues as the rock band (called "Big Beaver") after many hi-jinks does win the prize money and save Supercock.

== Cast ==
- Chen Xiang
- Ying Da
- Leon Dai
- Anthony Wong
- Annie Zhou
- Kathy Chow
- Cai Ming
- Liu Yiwei

== Reception ==
By January 30, the film had earned CN¥0.93 million at the Chinese box office.
