= My Huckleberry Friends =

- Also known as
- Simplified Chinese: 你好，旧时光
- Genre: Romance; Coming-of-age
- Based on: Hello, Old Times by Ba Yue Chang An
- Directed by: Sha Mo
- Starring: Li Landi; Zhang Xincheng
- Opening theme: My Light (我的光) - Huang Yali
- Ending theme: The Right to Choose (遥远的歌) - Liu Xijun
- Country of origin: China
- Original language: Mandarin
- No. of seasons: 1
- No. of episodes: 30

Production
- Executive producer: Dai Ying
- Production location: Qingdao
- Running time: 45 minutes
- Production companies: iQiyi, Sugar Man Media, HS Entertainment

Original release
- Network: iQiyi
- Release: 8 November 2017

Related
- With You; Unrequited Love

My Huckleberry Friends
- Simplified Chinese: 你好，旧时光
Transcriptions
Standard Mandarin
- Hanyu Pinyin: Ni Hao, Jiu Shi Guang

My Huckleberry Friends (Chinese: 你好，旧时光) is a 2017 Chinese streaming television series based on the novel Hello, Old Times (你好，旧时光) by Ba Yue Chang An (八月长安). It stars Li Landi and Zhang Xincheng in lead. It aired on iQiyi from 8 November 2017.

== Synopsis ==
This series follows Yu Zhou Zhou, a math prodigy, who defies her teachers and family's expectations and elects to study liberal arts; and Lin Yang, a friend she really treasures but grew apart from due to rumors and reconcile.

== Cast ==
- Li Landi as Yu Zhou Zhou
- Zhang Xincheng as Lin Yang
- Zhou Chengao as Ben Ben
- Li Qian as Mi Qiao
- Xu Meng Yuan as Xin Rui
- Cao En Qi as Chen An
- Tang Meng Jia as Ling Xiang Qian
- Zhao Jian Lei as Jiang Chuan
- Chen Peng Wan Li as Chu Tian Guo

== Soundtrack ==
No.	Title	Singer	Length
1.	"Time Delusion (时光遐想)" (Theme song)	Xu Fei	3:54
2.	"My Light (我的光)"	Huang Yali	4:29
3.	"The Right to Choose (遥远的歌)"	Liu Xijun	2:54
4.	"My Good Friend (我的好朋友)"	Zhang Yiran	4:35
5.	"Eighteen Year Old Me Who Loves You (爱你的我十八岁)"	Zuo Yan	3:38
6.	"Wind (风)"	Wang Xiaomin	4:26
7.	"People in the City (城市中的一些人)"	Li Qi	4:42
8.	"Secrets Untold (未说完的秘密)"	Sun Zihah	4:36
9.	"My Light (我的光)"	Zhou Ziyan	4:29
10.	"Thank You (谢谢侬)"	Eason Chan	4:20
11.	"Ten Years (十年)"	Eason Chan	3:25
12.	"Sponges (泡沫)"	花儿乐队	5:15

== Reception ==
The series was praised for incorporating family, kinship, friendship and romance; and showing timeline of growth to fully showcase a picture of youth.

== Awards and nominations ==
Award	Category	Recipient	Result	Ref.
29th China TV Golden Eagle Award	Outstanding Television Series		Nominated	
5th Hengdian Film and TV Festival of China	Outstanding Television Series	Li Jia	Won	

== Sequel ==
My Huckleberry Friends is the second installment of a youth series written by Bayue Changan, following With You and before Unrequited Love.
