= Dear Mayang Street =

- Traditional Chinese: 親愛的麻洋街
- Simplified Chinese: 亲爱的麻洋街
- Hanyu Pinyin: Qīn'ài De Máyáng Jiē
- Genre: Romance; Youth; Period
- Written by: Yu Fan
- Directed by: Huang Kemin; Zhou Jie
- Starring: Xu Weizhou; Tan Songyun; Niu Junfeng
- Country of origin: China
- Original language: Mandarin
- No. of episodes: 37

Production
- Producer: Gao Ming
- Production companies: Radiant Pictures; Youku; Ten Space; Hunan TV & Broadcast; SMG Pictures

Dear Mayang Street (Chinese: 亲爱的麻洋街; pinyin: Qīn'ài De Máyáng Jiē) is a 2020 Chinese television series starring Xu Weizhou, Tan Songyun and Niu Junfeng. The story starts in 1984 and tells of the youths of Mayang Street through adulthood.

== Synopsis ==
Mayang street in Guangzhou, early 1980s, Ou Xiaojian who grew up here dropped out of the police school and became a gangster on the street. Ma Xiaoxiao who grew up with him here couldn't understand his change. They had a fight about it and it was seen by Yi Dongdong who had a crush on Ma Xiaoxiao. Yi Dongdong had just moved here with his family and quickly became friends with a bunch of guys on the street who had similar age as him. A whirl of things gradually got him connected to Ma Xiaoxiao and Ou Xiaojian as well. The story is about their wild youthful years on the Mayang street.

== Cast ==
=== Main ===
- Xu Weizhou as Ou Xiaojian
- Tan Songyun as Ma Xiaoxiao
- Niu Junfeng as Yi Dongdong

=== Supporting ===
- Hu Haobo as Sun Sun
- Li Nan as Ma Dada
- Yi Zhixuan as Zeng Hang
- Yu Xiang as Liang Xiaobao
- Yu Xinyi as Zeng Hao
- Gong Rui as Yi Nannan
- Liu Yiran as Yi Xixi
- Chen Jin as Niu Zilai
- Shi Ke as Hao Pushi
- Jiao Gang as Yi Shengli
- Sun Lin as Lin Jiahao
- Yu Wentong as Liang Yuanchao
- Tian Min as Chen Lili
- Chang Kaining as Ma Yingjun
- Mu Liyan as Granny Zeng
- Luo Yinan as Zeng Zhenmei
- Ma Dongting as Sun Benyan

== Production ==
The series began filming in April 2019 in Guangzhou, and wrapped up in August 2019.
