= With You (Chinese TV series) =

- Promotional poster
- Also known as: The Best of Us
- Simplified Chinese: 最好的我们
- Genre: Romance; Coming-of-age
- Based on: The Best Of Us by Ba Yue Chang An
- Written by: Li Jia
- Directed by: Liu Chang
- Starring: Liu Haoran; Tan Songyun
- Country of origin: China
- Original language: Mandarin
- No. of seasons: 1
- No. of episodes: 24

Production
- Executive producer: Dai Ying
- Production locations: Qingdao; Beijing
- Running time: 45 minutes
- Production company: iQiyi

Original release
- Network: iQiyi
- Release: 8 April – 14 May 2016

Related
- My Huckleberry Friends; Unrequited Love

With You
- Simplified Chinese: 最好的我们
Transcriptions
Standard Mandarin
- Hanyu Pinyin: Zui Hao De Wo Men

With You (Chinese: 最好的我们) is a 2016 Chinese streaming television series based on the novel The Best of Us (最好的我们) by Ba Yue Chang An (八月长安). It stars Liu Haoran and Tan Songyun in lead. It aired on iQiyi from 8 April to 14 May 2016.

== Synopsis ==
This series follows Geng Geng, a slightly awkward but adorable freshman who feels like she's not smart enough to be at the prestigious Zhen Hua High School. The first day she happens to meet her future deskmate, the brilliant Yu Huai, they bicker at first but soon form a strong friendship. They all become good friends with their classmates and have a strong bond with their teacher, Zhang Ping. Geng Geng also attracts the attention of the school's resident rebel, Lu Xing He, who quickly falls in love with her and isn't shy about announcing his crush to the world.

== Cast ==
Class 5

- Liu Haoran as Yu Huai
- Tan Songyun as Geng Geng
- Dong Qing as Jiang Nian Nian (β)
- Chen Mengxi as Jian Dan
- Li Jiacheng as Han Xu
- Zhang Wenting as Wen Xiao Xiao
- Liu Wenqu as Zhu Yao
- Liu Qiheng as Xu Yan Liang

Faculty

- Fang Wenqiang as Zhang Ping
- Gao Wenfeng as Zhang Feng
- Zhang Lei as School Dean Pan
- Sheng Yuqin as Chinese teacher
- Fan Yimeng as Shen Tong
- Zhang Hang as Zhang Lai Shun
- Li Shengda as Gym teacher

Others

- Wang Yuexin as Lu Xing He
- Liang Hao as Zhou Mo
- Chao Ran as Luo Zhi
- Nie Zihao as Sheng Huai Nan
- An Jie as Bei Lin
- Zhao Yansong as Geng's father
- Qu Haifeng as Geng's mother
- Rong Zishan as Lin Fan

- Lan Tian as older Lin Fan

- Li Jiawei as Aunt Qi
- Liu Meihan as Japanese student
- Sun Jiayu as Chen Xue Jun
- Li Aijing as Ye Zhan Yan
- Sun Yingying as Ling Xiao Qian
- Dan Xiaohang as Zheng Ya Min
- Lian Jie as Lai Chun Yang
- Ning Zi as Yu's mother
- Lu Ying as Jiang Nian Nian (β)'s fake dad
- Ye Zhengtong as Fan Bin
- Sun Zilin as Wu Tong
- Cao Dongyu as Liu Fang Ping
- Yu Wentao as Wang Zhi Yong
- He Yajie as Lu Yang

== Soundtrack ==
No.	Title	Singer	Length
1.	"Geng Geng Yu Huai (耿耿于怀)" (Theme song)	Wang Xiaowen	4:14
2.	"Dear Classmates (亲爱的，同学)"	Momo Tiankong & Tan Songyun	3:57
3.	"The Right to Choose (选择权)"	Wang Yuexin	4:13
4.	"The Best of Us (最好的我们)"	Wang Yuexin	4:46

== Reception ==
The series was hailed as the Best Youth Drama by critics in recent years, and was praised for its realistic portrayal of youth and complex characters. The drama tackles common issues like school struggles, family issues, and the making and breaking of friendships and relationships; making it relatable to viewers. It has over 2 billion views online and a rating of 8.9 on Douban.

== Awards and nominations ==
Award	Category	Recipient	Result	Ref.
7th Macau International Television Festival	Best Television Producer	Dai Ying (戴莹)	Won	
25th Shanghai Television Festival (the Magnolia Awards)	Best Adaptated Screenplay	Li Jia	Nominated	

== Sequel ==
With You is the first installment of a youth series written by Bayue Changan, which also includes My Huckleberry Friends and Unrequited Love.
