= Ji Xiaobing =

Chinese actor

- Born: November 2, 1987 (age 38); Jiangsu, China
- Education: Beijing Film Academy
- Occupation: Actor
- Years active: 2010–present

Chinese name
- Simplified Chinese: 季肖冰
Transcriptions

Ji Xiaobing (Chinese: 季肖冰; born 2 November 1987) is a Chinese actor.

== Career ==
In 2010, Ji made his acting debut in the period family drama Family Reunion. In 2011, Ji starred in the military drama The No. 1 Landmark.

In 2013, Ji gained recognition for his performance in the historical drama Legend of Goddess Luo. In 2014, his popularity rose further with his role as Bo Yikao in the mythology drama The Investiture of the Gods. He further proved his versatility, earning recognition for his acting in the family drama Three Queens.

In 2016, Ji starred in the hit fantasy action drama Noble Aspirations. In 2017, Ji starred in the romance comedy drama The Fox's Summer.

In 2018, Ji starred in the hit crime mystery drama S.C.I. Mystery. He received the Capable Actor of the Year award at the Golden Bud - The Third Network Film and Television Festival,

In 2019, Ji starred in the highly rated romance drama Nice To Meet You, and played the male lead in the police romance drama You Are The Miracle. The same year, he was cast in the romance drama Be With You as the male lead.

In 2020, Ji starred in the fantasy romance drama Fairyland Lovers.

== Filmography ==
=== Film ===
| Year | English title | Chinese title | Role | Notes |
|---|---|---|---|---|
| 2016 | The Hear of the Beautiful Bones | 顿悟之白骨美人心 | Shuai Ge | |
| 2017 | Family of Winners | 垫底联盟 | Jin Weilian | |

=== Television series ===
| Year | English title | Chinese title | Role | Notes |
|---|---|---|---|---|
| 2010 | Family Reunion | 团圆 | Jin Haosheng | |
| 2010 | The No. 1 Landmark | 零号国境线 | Sun Jianxin | |
| 2011 | Duan Ci | 断刺 | Soldier | |
| 2012 | Ocean Couple | 望海的女人 | Ah Yuan | |
| 2012 | Luan Shi Hao Qing | 乱世豪情 | Shen Haigun | |
| 2013 | Legend of Goddess Luo | 新洛神 | Yang Xiu | |
| 2013 | The Distance of Love | 到爱的距离 | Cheng Ming | |
| 2014 | The Investiture of the Gods | 封神英雄榜 | Bo Yikao | |
| 2014 | Three Queens | 老妈的三国时代 | Yang Zizhong | |
| 2015 | Sun Lao Stubborn | 孙老倔的幸福 | Chen Mingjun | |
| 2015 | Midnight Taxi | 午夜计程车 | Li Gen | |
| 2016 | Mr. Right | 真命天子 | Chen Youjing | |
| 2016 | Novoland: The Castle in the Sky | 九州·天空城 | Pian Yu | |
| 2016 | Road of Loyalty | 义道 | Hao Mingxuan | |
| 2016 | Noble Aspirations | 青云志 | Hao Dali | |
| 2016 | The Princess Weiyoung | 锦绣未央 | Chiyun Si | |
| 2017 | The Fox's Summer | 狐狸的夏天 | Gao Yang | |
| 2017 | Fire Protection Special Force Elite | 特勤精英 | Zhuang Sen | |
| 2018 | Here to Heart | 温暖的弦 | Gao Fang | |
| 2018 | S.C.I. Mystery | S.C.I.谜案集 | Zhan Yao | |
| 2019 | Because of You | 只为遇见你 | Si Cheng | |
| 2019 | The Locked Room | 上锁的房间 | Wang Xinke | |
| 2019 | You Are The Miracle | 你是我的奇迹 | Lin Ze | |
| 2020 | Fairyland Lovers | 蓬莱间 | Yang Jian | |
| 2020 | Be With You | 好想和你在一起 | Ji Yanxin | |
| 2021 | The Trick of Life and Love | 机智的恋爱生活 | Ning Chengming | |
| 2021 | You Are My Glory | 你是我的荣耀 | Su Zhi | |
| 2021 | Lie to Love | 良言写意 | Xie Minghao | |

== Awards and nominations ==
| Year | Award | Category | Nominated work | Results | Ref. |
|---|---|---|---|---|---|
| 2019 | Golden Bud - The Third Network Film and Television Festival | Capable Actor of the Year | S.C.I. Mystery | Won | |
