= Unrequited Love =

Chinese television series

- Traditional Chinese: 暗戀橘生淮南
- Simplified Chinese: 暗恋橘生淮南
- Hanyu Pinyin: Ànliàn Jú Shēng Huáinán
- Genre: Youth; Romance
- Directed by: Li Muge
- Starring: Hu Yitian; Hu Bingqing
- Country of origin: China
- Original language: Mandarin
- No. of seasons: 1
- No. of episodes: 38

Production
- Executive producer: Zhao Wenjing
- Production locations: Xiamen; Harbin
- Production companies: China Film, Beijing HualuBaina Film

Original release
- Network: Mango TV
- Release: January 20, 2021 – present

Related
- With You; My Huckleberry Friends

Unrequited Love (Chinese: 暗恋橘生淮南; pinyin: Ànliàn Jú Shēng Huáinán) is a Chinese television series based on the novel of the same name by Bayue Chang'an. It stars Hu Yitian and Hu Bingqing. It aired on Mango TV starting from January 20, 2021.

== Synopsis ==
The love story of Luo Zhi and Sheng Huainan spans across fifteen years, focusing on them facing their feelings for each other over time. Luo Zhi and Huai Nan were childhood playmates. Due to a family problem, Luo Zhi had been diligently focusing on her studies. She and Huai Nan were not close in high school, though they both ended up in the same university. Luo Zhi kept making chances to meet her crush-Sheng Huainan. Their relationship develops as they start to hit it off. However, Ye Zhanyan and Ding Shui Jing's meddling, as well as complicated personal matters, lead to all sorts of misunderstandings.

== Cast ==
- Hu Yitian as Sheng Huainan (盛淮南)
- Hu Bingqing as Luo Zhi (洛枳)
- Zhang Yijie as Zhang Mingrui (张明瑞)
- Liu Meihan as Jiang Baili (江百丽)
- Liu Bi Qu as Chen Mohan (陈墨涵)
- Deng Kai as Ge Bi (戈壁)
- Liu Jia as Ye Zhanyan (叶展颜)
- Liu Yang as Lei Tian (雷天)
- Pu Tao as Ding Shuijing (丁水婧)
- Na Ji Ma as Xu Riqing (许日清)
- Zhai Xiao Wen as Xu Zhi'an (徐志安)
- Zhang Yi as Zheng Wenrui (郑文瑞)

== Sequel ==
Unrequited Love is the third installment of a youth series written by Bayue Changan, following With You and before My Huckleberry Friends.

There was a 2019 version of Unrequited Love starring Zhuyan Manci and Zhao Shunran.
