= Hu Bingqing =

Chinese actress

- Born: January 25, 1992 (age 34); Hefei, Anhui, China
- Education: Shanghai Institute of Visual Art
- Occupation: Actress
- Years active: 2012–present
- Agent: Tangren Media

Chinese name
- Simplified Chinese: 胡冰卿
Transcriptions

Hu Bingqing (Chinese: 胡冰卿, born 25 January 1992) is a Chinese actress who graduated from the Shanghai Institute of Visual Art. She is recognized for her role as Qi Baicao in The Whirlwind Girl (2015), Gao Yue in The Legend of Qin (2015) and Dugu Qieluo in The Legend of Dugu (2018).

== Career ==
Hu debuted with a minor role in the 2013 television series The Golden Flower and Her Son-in-law. She played her first leading role after successfully auditioning for it in the web drama Coco Soul produced by Tencent Video.

In 2014, Hu was cast as a supporting role in the historical drama The Imperial Doctress produced by Tangren Media. She subsequently signed a contract with the company.

In 2015, Hu starred as the female lead in the youth sports drama The Whirlwind Girl. The drama was a commercial success and launched Hu to fame. The same year, she starred in the historical wuxia drama The Legend of Qin playing dual roles.

In 2017, Hu starred in a segment of the slice-of-life drama Midnight Diner, playing a pair of lovers with Jam Hsiao.

In 2018, Hu starred in the fantasy historical drama Beauties in the Closet playing a weasel spirit. The same year, she starred in the historical fiction drama The Legend of Dugu, playing the role of Dugu Qieluo. The television series was well-received by viewers and had a significant following online.

In 2020, Hu starred in the period action drama Forward Forever. The same year, she is set to star in the campus romance drama Unrequited Love alongside Hu Yitian.

== Filmography ==
=== Television series ===
Year	English title	Chinese title	Role	Network	Notes
2013	The Golden Flower and Her Son-in-law	那金花和她的女婿	Nurse	Hunan TV	Minor role
2014	Fire Fighter	火线英雄	Jiang Xiaomei	Shanghai TV	
2014	Coco Soul	腾空的日子	Zhang Shan	Tencent	
2014	V Love	微时代	Guo Jing	Tencent	
2015	The Whirlwind Girl	旋风少女	Qi Baicao	Hunan TV	
2015	The Legend of Qin	秦时明月	Gao Yue	Hunan TV	
2016	The Imperial Doctress	女医·明妃传	Ru Xiang	Dragon TV, Jiangsu TV	
2017	Midnight Diner	深夜食堂	Xi Xi	Beijing TV, Zhejiang TV	Special appearance
2018	Beauties in the Closet	柜中美人	Huang Qingfeng	Youku	
2018	The Legend of Dugu	独孤天下	Dugu Jialuo	Tencent	
2018	20 Once Again	重返二十岁	Meng Lijun	iQiyi, Tencent	
2020	Forward Forever	热血同行	Aisin Gioro Yuchu	Youku	
2020	Swin to Sky	腾空之约	Yu Xiaoyu	iQiyi	
2020	The Best of Times	最好的时代	Lin Zhen	Hunan TV	
2021	Unrequited Love	暗恋橘生淮南	Luo Zhi	Mango TV	
TBA	My Spicy Love	我的爱如此麻辣	Xia Ruxing		
TBA	Insect Totem	虫图腾	Shi Miaomiao	Tencent	
TBA	Blue Lightning	蓝色闪电	Ning Meng	Tencent	

=== Short film ===
Year	English title	Chinese title	Role	Notes
2011	What Do I Use to Save You, My Faith	拿什么拯救你，我的信仰	Hu Jingyuan	
2012	Beautiful	美	Daughter	

== Discography ==
Year	English title	Chinese title	Album	Notes
2018	"Liu An Hua Ming"	柳暗花明	Beauties in the Closet OST	
2018	"Gazing Once Again"	再一次凝望	Twenties Once Again OST	

2021 Món quà của giáng sinh Thầm yêu - Quất sinh Hoài Nam 2021

== Awards ==
Year	Award	Category	Nominated work	Result	Ref.
2015	2015 Star Show	Trend Newcomer	—N/a	Won	
2017	Instyle Icon Awards	Best Performance - Female Artist	—N/a	Won	
