= Against the Current (TV series) =

2026 Chinese television series

- Promotional poster
- Based on: Lan Xiang Yuan written by He Yanshan
- Directed by: Huang Yingxiang; Chen Dan
- Starring: Tan Songyun; Liu Xueyi
- Country of origin: China
- Original language: Mandarin
- No. of seasons: 1
- No. of episodes: 47

Original release
- Network: Tencent Video; CCTV-8

Against the Current (simplified Chinese: 兰香如故; traditional Chinese: 蘭香如故) is a 2026 Chinese television series directed by Huang Yingxiang and Chen Dan. It stars Tan Songyun and Liu Xueyi in the lead roles. It is based on the novel Lan Xiang Yuan written by He Yanshan. It was released on Tencent Video and CCTV-8 in September 2026. It was also released on Apple TV, Rakuten Viki, and Disney+ in select regions.

== Cast ==
- Tan Songyun as Xu Lanxiang, adoptive daughter of a servant couple, originally Shen Jialan, first young lady of the Shen family
- Liu Xueyi as Lin Jinqi, first young master of the Lin family who was betrothed to Shen Jialan

=== Xu family ===
- Chen Chuang as Xu Wanquan, Xu Lanxiang's father
- Guo Keyu as Xue Guihua, Xu Lanxiang's mother
- Xue Yufei as young Xu Lanxiang

=== Lin family ===
- Hou Changrong as Lin Zhaoxiang, Lin Jinqi's grandfather and the family's patriarch
- Zhang Yi as Lin Chang-cheng, Lin Zhaoxiang's elder son and Lin Jinqi's father
- Kong Lingmei as Qin Shunhua, Lin Chang-cheng's wife and Lin Jinqi's mother
- Wei Zixin as Lin Changmin, Lin Zhaoxiang's younger son
- Zhao Qin as Wang Lingxiao, Lin Changmin's wife
- Tao Pu as Lin Xiulai, the first young lady, daughter of Lin Chang-cheng and his first concubine
- Guo Jianan as Lin Jinlan, the second young master, son of Lin Chang-cheng and his second concubine
- Ma Fanding as Lin Xiuru, the third young lady, daughter of Lin Changzheng and his third concubine
- Liu Jiaxi as Lin Xiushu, the fourth young lady, daughter of Lin Chang-cheng and Qin Shunhua
- Wang Jiaxuan as Lin Jinqiao, the third young master, son of Lin Changmin and Wang Lingxiao
- Wu Tiantian as Lin Xiuwan, the second young lady, daughter of Lin Changmin and Wang Lingxiao
- Shan Yuhao as Lin Jincen, the fourth young master, son of Lin Changmin and Wang Lingxiao
- Wang Hongxin as Nan Ke, Lin Jinqi's personal bodyguard
- Pan Yihong as Jiugao, Lin Jinqi's personal bodyguard
- Ye Qing as Yu Chan, the head maid
- Liu Meihan as Lü Ji'er, Xu Lanxiang's childhood neighbor and fellow maid
- Song Fangyuan as Du Xiaolian, a maid working in the kitchen
- Jiaxin Li as Gan Tang, a maid working in the gardens
- Tang Mengjia as Bao Gai, a maid working in the tea room

=== Shen family ===
- Li Zhimo as young Shen Jialan

=== Zhao family ===
- Li Meng as Zhao Xingtang, first young lady and Lin Jinqi's first wife
- Wang Yuning as Zhao Xuede, Zhao Xingtang's father
- Sun Zhongqiu as Zhao Gang, Zhao Xingtang's elder brother
- Ma Wenyuan as Qian Shaoze, Zhao Xingtang's distant cousin and illicit lover
- Gao Rong as Qing Xiang, Zhao Xingtang's head maid

=== Other characters ===
- Ye Xiaowei as Du Zheng, a soldier taken in by the Lin family for shielding Lin Jinqi from a sword strike in battle
- Zheng Hehuizi as Du Cuique, Du Zheng's younger sister
- He Peng as Yuan Shaohui, a marquis and military general whom Lin Jinqi comes to work closely with
- Su Ke as Lu Xie, owner of a calligraphy and painting shop which he rents, along with a part of his residence, out to the Xu family
- Niu Junfeng as Han Liang, a scholar who lives next-door to Lu Xie and later the Xu family
- Zheng Weili as Feng Lin, Han Liang's mother
- Zhang Huanhuan as Han Yi, Han Liang's elder sister
- Guan Chang ass Fu Rong, an opera performer whom Xu Lanxiang becomes close to
- Jia Ze as Zheng Manyi, a noble young lady eyed to become Lin Jinqi's second wife
- Shen Tai as Zheng Baichuan, Zheng Manyi's father, a duke
- Kong Lianshun as the Crown Prince and later the Emperor
- Li Hongliang as Prince of Han, the Crown Prince's brother

== Soundtrack ==
No.	Title	Lyrics	Music	Singer	Length
1.	"Return from a Great Dream (大梦归)" (Main theme)	Chen Xi	Chen Xi	Zhou Shen	3:49
2.	"A Hazy Melody (一曲微茫)" (Lanxiang's character theme)	Chen Xi	Chen Xi	Yisa Yu	3:01
3.	"As Before (如故)" (Interlude)	Chen Xi	Chen Xi, Dong Dongdong	Isabelle Huang	3:08
4.	"I Will Write My Own Name (我来书写我的名)" (Interlude)	Chen Xi	Chen Xi, Dong Dongdong	Reno Wang	2:57
5.	"Into the Painting (入画)" (Interlude)	Chen Xi	Chen Xi	Zhang Zining	3:33
6.	"Flowers Bloom along the Courtyard Walls (花开满篱院)" (亲情曲)	Shao Hang	Jiang Ke	Tan Songyun	3:05
7.	"Flowers Bloom along the Courtyard Walls (花开满篱院)" (Surprise bonus song)	Shao Hang	Jiang Ke	Liu Xueyi	3:20
8.	"The Deeply Intertwined Us (深深的我们)" (Interlude)	Chen Kexin	Bryan (Sun Wei)	Liu Xijun	4:00
9.	"On the Same Path (同道)" (Interlude)	Yu Yan (uyyan)	Yu Yan (uyyan)	Jess Lee	4:00
10.	"Center of Time (时间中央)" (Interlude)	Bryan (Sun Wei)	Bryan (Sun Wei)	Yisa Yu	3:54
11.	"Wish to Be Like a Firefly (愿若萤火)" (Interlude)	Lin Qiao, Wu Shang, Shen Hani	Wen Shuyin	Cao Yang	4:36
12.	"Quietly Awaiting Pure Light (静待清光)" (Interlude)	Xu Mingming	Xu Mingming	Xu Mingming	3:24
13.	"Forever Unforgotten (恋恋不忘)" (Interlude)	Chen Kexin	Bryan (Sun Wei)	Liu Yu	3:53
14.	"Fragrance of Orchids Remain (兰香如故)" (Interlude)	Yu Yan (uyyan)	Yu Yan (uyyan)	Ye Xuanqing	3:36
15.	"Sweet-scented Days (香暖时光)" (Interlude)	Bryan (Sun Wei)	Hu Chen	Chen Yue	3:57
