= Wang Luoyong =

Chinese actor

- 王洛勇
- Born: 24 December 1958 (age 67); Luoyang, Henan, China
- Education: Wuhan Conservatory of Music; Shanghai Theatre Academy; Boston University
- Occupations: Actor, Broadway singer
- Years active: 1981–present
- Spouse: Ning Ding (m. 1991)
- Parent(s): Wang Zhouchuan (father); Cheng Pu-ching (mother)

Wang Luoyong (Chinese: 王洛勇; pinyin: wáng luóyóng; born 24 December 1958) is a Chinese actor who has appeared in American films. He first appeared in Dragon: The Bruce Lee Story as Ip Man. He had recently appeared in CCTV's The Legend of Bruce Lee as Shao Ruhai, a master of Hung Ga and the first to train Bruce Lee (played by Danny Chan). His character "Shao Ruhai" is partially based on James Yimm Lee. He is also the first Chinese Broadway singer.

== Early life and education ==
Wang was born in Luoyang, Henan, on 24 December 1958, where his parents came to for participating in the construction of key projects. The art enlightenment teacher was his uncle, who taught Wang to play the flute. In 1971, he forced to take part in the Down to the Countryside Movement, and he was admitted to the Shiyan Peking Opera Troupe. In the troupe, due to he liked the sound of the French horn in Taking Tiger Mountain by Strategy, he asked to learn to play it, and he was arranged to study in Hubei Song and Dance Troupe. During that time, he was admitted to Wuhan Conservatory of Music and learned to play the French horn, compose music and other skills. Later, he was accepted to Shanghai Theatre Academy.

After graduating in 1986, Wang pursued advanced studies in the United States. He applied to study at Louisiana State University, but was not accepted because of his poor English. For living expenses, he had to do odd jobs to earn money, washing dishes, delivering takeout, weeding, etc. Later, he was admitted to the Department of Drama and Performance, Boston University, earning a master's degree in 1989. After university, he was recruited by the University of Wisconsin–Milwaukee.

== Acting career ==
Wang became widely known to audiences with Miss Saigon (1992).

Since 1993, he played a number of minor roles in various television series including Dragon: The Bruce Lee Story (1993), Vanishing Son III (1994), Daylight (1996), Rollerball (2002), Avatar (2004), and Smile (2006).

Wang returned to China in 2001.

In 2003, Wang appeared in Tracks In The Snow Forest, based on Qu Bo's novel of the same name, as Yang Zirong.

Wang starred as Guo Jing in the 2006 wuxia television series The Return of the Condor Heroes, adapted from Hong Kong novelist Jin Yong's novel of the same title.

In 2008, he was cast as Shao Ruhai in The Legend of Bruce Lee, in which Danny Chan Kwok-kwan played Bruce Lee.

Wang portrayed Li Bai in the historical television series The Legend of Yang Guifei (2009).

In 2016, Wang's big break came when Zhang Yongxin cast him in the historical war television series The Advisors Alliance, in which he played Zhuge Liang, a role which brought him much publicity.

Wang appeared in My People, My Country, a seven-part anthology drama film released in 2019 to commemorate the 70th anniversary of the establishment of the People's Republic of China.

== Filmography ==
=== Film ===
Year	English title	Chinese title	Role	Notes
1981	Bi Sheng	毕昇	Foreign merchant	
1995	Qing Feng	青凤	Huo Qubing	
1993	Dragon: The Bruce Lee Story	龙：李小龙故事	Ip Man	
1994	Vanishing Son III	黑帮大追杀	Chou Pei	
1996	Daylight	龙出生天	Gem dealer	
1997	The Song of Life	生命如歌	Ah Jian	
1998	Dragon	龙	Yepman	
1999	Xiu Xiu: The Sent-Down Girl	天浴	Narrator	
2002	Lena's Rain	莲娜的雨	Julian Chen	
2002	Rollerball	滚球大战	Chinese Sports Announcer	
2004	Avatar	异次元战神	Victor Wang	
2004	Deng Xiaoping in 1928	邓小平·1928	Cao Wurong	
2005	The White Countess	伯爵夫人	Drivers Liu	
2005	Smile	微笑	Daniel	
2007		面子	Dr. Winstin Liu	
2008		浪淘真金	Zhao Zhenjin	
2009	Shi Xiu	拼命三郎石秀	Shi Lianshan	
2009	Gu Dasao	母大虫顾大嫂	Mao Zhongyi	
2009	Snow Lover	腊月雪	Li Xiao'an	
2009	A Face, B Face	A面B面		
2009	Great Northern Wilderness	北大荒	General	
2009	Berkeu	别尔克乌	Wu Hua	
2012	Live or Death in Lop Nor	生死罗布泊	Zheng Jiangang	
2014		巴彦岱	Lao Wang	
2016	Xun Mingsheng	寻明胜	Xun Mingsheng	
2016	Innocent	无罪	Zhang Hongqi	
2018	Minning Town	闽宁镇	Lin Xiaojun	
2018	Wen Zhaorong	文朝荣	Wen Zhaorong	
2019	My People, My Country	我和我的祖国	An Wenbin	
2021	Music	幸福刚刚好	Felix's dad	

=== Television ===
Year	English title	Chinese title	Role	Notes
1993	New world	新大陆	Jiang Jianguo	
1995	Vanishing Son	失踪的儿子	Chou Pei	
1999	Third Watch	城市守护者第三梯队	Luke Tan	
2000	The Street			
2002	Beyond San Francissco	走过旧金山	Ding Mingyang	
2003		生死卧底	Zhu Yangguang	
2003	Tracks In the Snow Forest	林海雪原	Yang Zirong	
2004	Woman Edge	卓尔的故事	Zheng Dalei	
2004	Empty house	空房子	Liu Yongming	
2006		雄关遗梦	Xu Guangtai	
2006	Visitors On the Icy Mountain	冰山上的来客	Platoon leader Yang	
2006	Love in the Midst of War	爱在战火纷飞时	Deputy commander Chen	
2006	The Return of the Condor Heroes	神雕侠侣	Guo Jing	
2007	Survivor	幸存者	Brigade commander Zhou	
2007	Last Bullet	最后的子弹	Ma Yiwen	
2007	Hero Has No Name	英雄无名	Zhang Xueliang	
2008	It's Good To Be Alive	活着真好		
2008	The Legend of Bruce Lee	李小龙传奇	Shao Ruhai	
2009	Chinese Peacekeeping Police	中国维和警察	Feng Liwei	
2009	The Legend of Yang Guifei	杨贵妃秘史	Li Bai	
2009	Save the Female Soldier Situ Hui	拯救女兵司徒慧	Wu Shaoqing	
2009	The Hearts of the People	天地民心	Mujangga	
2011		铁头捍卫	Jin Mingyi	
2011	Jiao Yulu	焦裕禄	Jiao Yulu	
2011		绝杀	Yuan Fei	
2012	Judgement of Hongwu	洪武大案	Zheng Shiyuan	
2012	Old Ford	老渡口	Chang Xudong	
2012		风起第一关		
2012	Concatenate Traps	连环套	Wang Changping	
2013	Northeast Counter-Japanese United Army	东北抗日联军	Yang Jingyu	
2013	Wang Jiaxiang	王稼祥	Wang Jiaxiang	
2014	Time of Returning to City	返城年代	Director	
2015		大江作证	Liang Changqing	
2016	The Golden Land	金色大地	Geng Changsuo	
2016	The Advisors Alliance	军师联盟之虎啸龙吟	Zhuge Liang	
2018	Qiao's Grand Courtyard 2	诚忠堂	Yin Chang	
2020	So Young	小夜曲	Lin Zhongdao	

=== Drama ===
Year	English title	Chinese title	Role	Notes
1983	Chief of Labor Department	劳资科长	Chief of Labor Department	
1984	Other People's Head	别人的脑袋	Valoran	
1985	Eldest Son	长子	Buskin	
1987	Hamlet	哈姆雷特	Prince Hamlet	
1987	Romeo and Juliet	罗密欧与朱丽叶	Romeo	
1987	A Midsummer Night's Dream	仲夏夜之梦	Lysander	
1987	The King and I	国王与我	The King of Siam	
1988	The Tempest	暴风雨	Ariel	
1989	Waiting for Godot	等待戈多	The Boy	
1990	M. Butterfly	蝴蝶君	Song Liling	
1992	Miss Saigon	西贡小姐	Engineer	
1993		木达科桥	Mr. Long	
1994	Hua Mulan	花木兰	Si Xu	
2001	Kong Yiji	孔乙己正传	Kong Yiji	
2009	Jane Eyre	简·爱	Edward Fairfax Rochester	
2021	Outpost	前哨	Lu Xun	

=== Variety show ===
Year	English title	Chinese title	Role	Notes
2018	Same Class	同一堂课	Himself	
2018	A Good Book	一本好书	Himself	
2018	The Sound	身临其境		
2018	The Readers	朗读者	Himself	
2020	The Hero in the Poster	海报里的英雄	Himself	
2021	China in Classics	典籍里的中国	Qu Yuan	
