= Starry Love =

2023 Chinese costume drama

Starry Love is a 2023 Chinese guzhuang drama based on the novel of the same name by the online author "Once Upon a Time Junhua". It is the third installment of the "Honey Trilogy", produced by Perfect World Pictures. Directed by Zhu Rui Bin and starring Chen Xingxu, Li Lan Di, Chen Muchi and He Xuanlin, it premiered on February 16, 2023, on Jiangsu TV and Zhejiang TV, synchronized on Youku and premiered on Line TV in Taiwan.

== Plot ==
A twin flower was born from the Purple Qi of the Earth Vein of Dongqiu. The four former rulers of the Mortal, Beast, Heavenly, and Void realms decided to destroy it, believing that it would be best for their realms. To survive, the flower spirit drifted into the belly of the mortal Empress, giving birth to two princesses (Qingkui and Yetan); Qingkui has the power of purity, and Yetan has the power of impurity. The older sister, Qingkui, was born with a holy light from the sky, was loved and admired by all, admired by the human race, would enter the Heavenly Realm as a consort. Yetan, was born with a bad omen; the queen died from childbirth, so she was chosen to be married into the Void Realm as the crown princess. When the two worlds welcomed the marriage, the twin sisters' sedans were accidentally switched; Yetan married into the Heavenly Realm with the Empyrean Shaodian Youqin, and Qingkui married into the Void Realm with the Third Prince Chaofeng. The lovers are faced with a conflict between their love and their concern for life. The sisters courageously battle enemies, bring peace and keep the four realms safe.

== Main cast ==
| Actor | Roles | Description |
|---|---|---|
| Chen Xingxu | Shaodian Youqin | Empyrean Xuanshang: Eldest son of the Emperor and Empress of Heaven, brother of Qingheng and Ziwu, husband of Yetan, and brother-in-law of Qingkui. When he was young, his father wanted him to protect the Seal of Guixu despite his mother's objections. He did so because his brother was too young, was trained and surrendered his emotions. Returning several years later, he was disturbed by the arrival of Yetan (the fake Qingkui) before they grew close. When Youqin died attempting to fix the Seal of Guixu, Yetan went into the Mortal Realm to find his three shards of consciousness and revive him. When he learns that Yetan was accidentally married into the Heavenly Realm, he does not care because he loves her. When Yetan's identity as a descendant of the Purple Qi of Dongqiu was known, the rulers of the other realms began hunting for her and the Heavenly Emperor ordered her to be executed. Youqin refused this order and received a spell which was supposed to make him lose his memory. To bring peace to the realms, Yetan sacrificed herself and Youqin is heartbroken. To make up for his mistakes, the Heavenly Emperor enables Youqin to revive the Purple Qi of Dongqiu. He uses his blood to nourish Princess Qingkui's purity qi; Chaofeng nourishes Princess Yetan's impurity qi with his blood, and they wait for the twin flowers of the Purple Chi of the Earth Vein to be reborn. |
| Chen Xingxu | Lamu | Fire Demon (First Piece of Divine Consciousness): He descends into the village of Yue Wo in the human world. With red hair and a bad temper, he is called the Fire Demon by the villagers but is really kind-hearted and quiet. Yetan calls him "Lamu." He leaves the village with Yetan, and falls for her. |
| Chen Xingxu | Mei Youqin | Master of the Assassin's Hall of Fragrance (Second Piece of Divine Consciousness): An assassin from the Beast Realm, he claims cases as his own to recruit his men. When he meets Yetan, he is cool to her; he later nicknames her "Qian'er" and marries her. When Yetan is injured by frost poison (a magic spell from the Void), he pays thousands of dollars to save her. |
| Chen Xingxu | Wenren | Owner of the Colorful Pavilion (Third Piece of Divine Consciousness): Yetan meets Wenren on Mount Linglong, and names her Yuexia. He has affairs with women in the human realm before he falls in love with Yetan. |
| Li Landi | Liguang Yetan | Second Princess of Mortals: One of the two flowers of the Purple Qi of Dongqiu, married to Youqin as the Consort of Heaven. Sister-in-law of Qingheng and Ziwu, sister-in-law of Chaofeng. The youngest mortal princess, sister of Qingkui, originally the crown princess of the Void Realm, later the wife of Youqin. Yetan entered the Heavenly Realm by mistake, and witnessed Chaofeng trying to assassinate his older brother; she was swapped with her sister to keep this secret. Her mother (the Queen) died in childbirth. When Youqin died from resealing Guixu, she travelled to the Mortal and Beast Realms to find his shards of consciousness and revive him. She learns from Suzhi that she and her sister are the twin flowers of the Purple Qi of Dongqiu, and avenges her sister's death. With Suzhi's help, Yetan joins Chaofeng to kill the king and queen of the Void Realm. She wants to return to the world with Shaodian Youqin, but Suzhi brings her to the ruins of Dongqiu. Youqin finds the badly-injured Yetan and sacrifices herself to save the Four Realms; she and her sister are reborn. |
| Chen Mushi | Chaofeng | Third Prince of the Void: Son of Yanfang and Xue Qingxin, half-brother of Wudai and Dingyun, husband of Qingkui, and brother-in-law of Youqin and Yetan. He secretly wants to become king of the Void Realm. Mushi swaps Qingkui and Yetan, pretending to protect Qingkui, and falls in love with her. When QingKui's identity as a descendant of the Purple Qi of Dongqiu is known, the Void King and the other realm rulers wanted to execute her but Chaofeng refused; the Void King imprisons him in the Cave of Haunted Souls. The Void Queen tortures him before Yetan helps him escape. When Qingkui kills herself, he is a heartbroken. To revive her, he settles in Dongqiu with Shaodian Youqin. He uses his heart blood to nourish Yetan's impurity qi, and Shaodian Youqin nourishes Qingkui's purity qi with his heart blood and waits for the rebirth of the twin flowers of the Purple Qi of Dongqiu. |
| He Xuanlin | Liguang Qingkui | First Princess of Mortals: One of the two Purple Flowers of Purple Qi of Dongqiu, married to Chaofeng, sister-in-law of Youqin, eldest princess of the Emperor and Empress of the Mortal Realm, older sister of Yetan, crown princess of the Heavenly Realm, and eldest princess of the human world. She enters the Void Realm by mistake, and is despised because of her status as a human being. Qingkui learns from Suzhi that she and her sister are the twin flowers of the Purple Qi of the Earth Vein of Dongqiu. To save her sister from being killed, she kills herself and is reborn. |

=== Heavenly Realm ===
| Actor | Roles | Description |
|---|---|---|
| ZhouTie | Shaodian Xiaoyi | Emperor of Heaven: Father of Youqin, Qingheng and Ziwu, he disapproves of the relationship between Youqin and Yetan. When he learns about Qingkui and Yetan's identity as the Purple Qi of the Earth Vein of Dongqiu, he orders their execution; Qingkui cuts her own throat to save Yetan. To help Suzhi revive the flower spirits of Dongqiu, Yetan goes to the Heavenly Realm to ask the emperor for the Spiritual Lamp. The Heavenly Emperor hands it over, not realising that the flower spirits had been destroyed by the previous emperor with the Supreme Divine Fire ten thousand years ago. The Heavenly Emperor (thinking that Yetan is a demon) wants to kill her, but Yetan defeats him. When he learns that she sacrificed himself to save the Four Realms, he passes the throne to Qingheng and proposes to rebuild Dongqiu (which may be able to revive the Purple Qi). |
| Kong Songjin | Xia Nihong | Queen of Heaven, Mother Goddess: Descendant of the Xia clan and mother of Youqin, Qingheng and Ziwu. She cannot bear to part with Youqin, helps Yetan many times, and takes the Xia clan from the Heavenly Realm (and the emperor). |
| Zhouzhan | Shaodian Qingheng | Second prince of the Heavenly Realm (later Emperor of Heaven): The younger brother of Youqin and the older brother of Ziwu, and commander-in-chief of the Southern Heavenly Gate when the Void attacked the Heavenly Realm. He becomes Emperor of Heaven. |
| Dai Yaqi | Shaodian Ziwu | Young princess of the Heavenly Realm and consort of the Young Lord of the Beast Realm: Sister of Youqin and Qingheng. Thinking that an animal on the road is a pet, she names him Ah Chai; she later learns that it was the Young Lord of Beast Realm, Di Lanjue, in animal form. Ziwu falls in love with him, they marry and she becomes pregnant. |
| Bai Yufei | Husui/Suzhi | A native of Dongqiu who is rescued by Yetan. When Dongqiu was destroyed, she put a strand of her soul on a caraway plant. When a subordinate from the Void attacks her, she identifies the twin sisters as the Purple Qi of the Earth Vein of Dongqiu. Friends with Qingheng, she leaves him due to her desire for revenge and tricks Yetan into following her to the ruins of Dongqiu. |
| Li Bao'er | Lingpu Grandmaster | The Ten Thousand Year Supreme God: He lives in the Xuanhuang Realm, in charge of alchemy, and specialises in collecting treasures to produce magic weapons. Ten thousand years ago, he secretly rescued the flower spirits of Dongqiu in a lantern. |
| Lu Junyao | Immortal Xiao Yu | The Ten Thousand Year Supreme God: In charge of praying for blessings and avoiding disasters. |
| Fu Hongsheng | Thunder Heavenly Father | The Ten Thousand Year Supreme God: In charge of thunderbolts. |
| Cao Jie | Feichi | Transformed by a dragonfly, one of Youqin's attendants, he is devoted to Youqin and Princess Yetan. |
| Li Junzhe | Hanmo | Servant of Youqin. |
| Zhang Chenglang | Er Lang Shen | In charge of the Southern Heavenly Gate, he secretly helps Yetan succeed in her search for divine knowledge in the world. |
| Chen Siche | Xia Biqiong | From the Xia clan, a cousin of Youqin, she loves Youqin and is hostile to Yetan. |
| Wei Bingye | Xia Tuiyun | From the Xia clan, the older brother of Biqiong and deputy deacon of the Upper School. He is injured by Youqin when he harms Yetan. |
| Cao Jun | Qinli Star King | Upper Book Capsule Deacon. |
| Zhu Xiang | Guangtian Jiangjun | General of the Heavens，mistakenly called as the Cremation Generals and the King's Bastard Generals by Yetan, he acts only on the Emperor's orders. |
| Cheng Cheng | Xuanguang Shenjun | Teacher of Shaodian Youqin: He died a thousand years ago to repair the seal of the Returning Ruins. Shaodian Youqin was told of his mission as a Divine Monarch and to be ready to lead the repair of the Returning Ruins at any time. |
| Sa Dingding | Yuhe Xianren (Immortal Yuhe) | In charge of the cranes. |
| Gao Yuqing | Chashen Luyu | In charge of the tea tree. |

=== Void Realm ===
| Actor | Roles | Description |
|---|---|---|
| Tang Guozhong | Yanfang | King of the Void: Wants to destroy the Heavenly Realm, and pits his three sons against each other by saying that whoever kills Youqin will become the Crown Prince of the Void. Favouring his two elder sons over Chaofeng (the youngest), he is killed by Yetan. |
| Michelle Hu | Yingzhao | Queen of Shen Yuan and mother of Dingyun: Former mother of the Snake Clan, a ruthless woman who wants her son to be crowned king, she is killed by Xue Qingxin. |
| Wan Ran | Xue Qingxin | Snow Consort of the Void, mother of Chaofeng: A remnant of the lowly Fuzhu clan, she advises her son to keep a low profile and is fond of Qingkui, her daughter-in-law. |
| Jiang Xiaolin | Wudai | The Great Prince (later King of the Void): A simple-minded man, skilled in the martial arts, who loves Qingkui. |
| Dan Zengpumei | Dingyun | Second Prince of the Void: Son of the Queen of Shen Yuan, he tries to harm Yetan. |
| Ji Tianyu | Jia Luoluo | Saint of the Snake Clan, later the consort of Wudai: Qingkui removes her scars from snake scales, and she provides an antidote for Chaofeng's snake poisoning. Fond of Wudai, she becomes his consort. |
| Cao Bo | Gu Haichao | Likes to sneer at Chaofeng but is really loyal, and loves Sushui. |
| Wang Ruoxi | Sushui | Cares for Liguang Qingkui, and likes Gu Haichao. |
| Li Long | Sicao | Deacon of the Soul Wraithing Cave, in charge of the Void prison, and an old friend of Chaofeng. |
| Gong Zhengye | Zhu Jiuyin | A follower of the Dingyun, he is killed by Chaofeng when he discovers Qingkui's identity. |
| Gong Zhengye | Zhu Duanshan | The brother of Zhu Jiuyin, he joins Dingyun's men to avenge his brother's death. After trying to kill Qingkui and Yetan, he kills Manman and is killed by Yetan. |

=== Beast Realm ===
| Actor | Roles | Description |
|---|---|---|
| Xia Jiawei | King of the Beasts | Lord of the Beast World and the father of Di Lanjue, he is afraid of the queen and keeps a low profile. He hopes that his son will marry Ziwu. |
| Yu Yang | Queen of the Beasts | Loving mother of Di Lanjue. |
| Qin Tianyu | Di Lanjue | Prince of the Beast Realm: Falls in love with, and marries, Ziwu. |
| Wang Lina | Manman | Spirit bird: A pink bird, more beautiful than a phoenix and a close friend of Yetan, who secretly accompanies her to the heavenly realm. To save her sisters, she is killed by Zhu Duanshan from the Void Realm. |

=== Human world ===
| Actor | Roles | Description |
|---|---|---|
| Xia Minghao | Emperor Tun | Father of Qingkui and Yetan, a timid man who feels that the human race is the weakest. For 18 years, he treated Qingkui as a treasure and Yetan coldly. After learning that his daughters were married by mistake, he learns that Yetan has the blessing (and protection) of Shaodian Youqin. He reveals that he loves both daughters, but the world has always targeted Yetan and he cannot express his love for her. |
| Huang Xiaohui | Tun The Queen | Li, mother of Qingkui and Yetan. She dies in childbirth, and is posthumously named Empress Xiaowen Shun. |
| Chen Jingbo | Liguang Chiyao | Grand Chancellor of Humans: Served for three dynasties. After Yetan's birth, he writs to Emperor Tun to have her executed. After the emperor tells Youqin why Yetan had been neglected, Youqin replaces the Star of Fate with a Jinx Star and Chiyao is dismissed by his ministers. |

== Production and publicity ==
Production began on 21 September 2021 with the announcement of the main cast of the series, which was promoted as the third chapter of Perfect World Pictures' Honey Trilogy. The first stills were released on 19 October, and the series entered post-production on 6 January 2022. Executive producer Liu Ning said that the post-production special effects took about 10 months, and the production team added that the show uses a variety of national colours to recreate the Four Realms: the blue Heavenly Realm, the purple-and-black Void Realm, and the bamboo-and-red Beast Realm. In June 2022, the first trailer for the show was released. The show received its distribution licence from the General Administration of Radio, Film and Television on 27 December.

On 10 February 2023, a media viewing was held in Beijing with actors Chen Xingxu, Li Landi, Chen Muchi, He Xuanlin and Qin Tianyu, executive producer Liu Ning, artistic director Liu Ling and music director Sa Dingding. Liu Ning said that the series did not use voice actors. Four days later, its premiere on Jiangsu TV and Zhejiang TV that month was announced with a poster and another trailer. On 20 February, actors Chen Xingxu and Li Landi held a promotional event at Sina Weibo headquarters. Three days later, a press conference was held in Guangzhou with Liu Ning, Chen Xingxu, Li Landi, Chen Muchi, He Xuanlin, Qin Tianyu, Zhou Lijie, Dan Zengpumei, Dai Yaqi, and Cao Bo.

== Songs ==
Film and TV soundtrack
| No. | Title | Lyrics | Music | Singing | Length |
|---|---|---|---|---|---|
| 1. | "Yu Zi Cheng Shuo" (title song) | Chen Xuan | Sa Dingding | Liu Yuning |
| 2. | "Tian Di Wu Xia" (end-credits song) | Lin Qiao, Liu Enxun | Sa Dingding | Male version：Mao Buyi; Female version：Sa Dingding |
| 3. | "Starry Love" (theme song) | Chen Xuan | Sa Dingding | Sa Dingding |
| 4. | "Shuang Hua Er" | Lin Qiao、Ling | Sa Dingding | Shuang Sheng |
