= Sounds (short story) =

"Sounds" is a short story by Russian American author Vladimir Nabokov originally written in Russian in September 1923.

== Plot summary ==
In the story, the narrator recounts to an old flame a date they once had, whilst her husband was away, where they visited a friend, Pal Palych, in the country. From the very beginning, it is revealed that the narrator is an aesthetic individual, prone to epiphanies. For him, the world seems "homogeneous, congruent, bound by the laws of harmony". Whereas the narrator is prone to communicate his epiphanies in the language of sound, the woman is "habitually untalkative". When the narrator must venture back to Palych's house to retrieve his date's cigarette-holder, he finds his friend bleary eyed and suggests that he get outside more. Towards the end, the woman tells the narrator that she'd leave her husband to be with him. The reader by now already suspects that something is up, as the narrator has revealed that he loves not only her, but the entire world: "it was not you alone who were my lover but the entire earth". In the end, the narrator rides his bicycle home, stopping along the way to sit on a park bench where he notices a woman he plans to talk to, as well as seeing Palych fishing.
