= 20 Once Again (TV series) =

2018 Chinese television series

20 Once Again (Note: Mandarin: 重返二十岁 / 重返20岁; pinyin: Chóng fǎn èr shí suì) is a 2018 Mandarin-language Chinese comedy television series adaptation of the film 20 Once Again, which itself is a remake of the South Korean film Miss Granny. It stars Hu Bingqing and Elvis Han.

== Plot ==
A senior couple is unexpectedly transported back to their twenties, leading to amusing situations as they grapple with readjusting to life as youthful individuals.
