= The Sound (Chinese TV series) =

- Judges: 300 public audiences
- Winner: Zhu Yawen
- Finals venue: Hunan Broadcasting System

Release
- Original network: Hunan Television
- Original release: January 6 – March 17, 2018

The Sound (simplified Chinese: 声临其境; traditional Chinese: 聲臨其境) is a Chinese reality television competition that first aired on Hunan TV on January 6, 2018. The show, hosted by Wáng Kǎi, tests the dubbing and performing abilities of artists. The first episode was taped on December 19, 2017, and premiered on December 30, 2017. It aired officially on Saturdays at 10:00 p.m. on Hunan TV after The Inn.

Zhu Yawen was the season's champion.

== Rules ==
The show has 11 episodes—nine regular competitions and two rounds for the season finale.

For every regular competition, there are four actors or voice actors who compete against each other. Five or six new observers try to guess who the four contestants are. Every episode has three rounds of competition. For the first two rounds, the contestants dub behind the scene. For the third round, they perform on stage. An audience of 300 votes and decides who is the night's winner. The winner then advances to the season finale.

Assistant host, Sheng, is the only one who knows the identity of all the contestants before they perform on stage.

== Result ==
Safe	Proceed to the Season Finale	Eliminated	Champion	Other Ranking	Withdrew

	Guest	Broadcast Date (2018)										
	Guest	6 January	13 January	20 January	27 January	3 February	10 February	17 February	24 February	3 March	10 March	17 March
	Guest	1st Round	2nd Round	3rd Round	4th Round	5th Round	6th Round	7th Round	8th Round	9th Round	Season Finale	
	Guest	1st Round	2nd Round	3rd Round	4th Round	5th Round	6th Round	7th Round	8th Round	9th Round	1st Round	2nd Round
1	(Sweden) Li-Xin Zhao	1	—	—	—	—	—	—	—	—		
2	(United Kingdom) Zhang Tielin	—	1	—	—	—	—	—	—	—		
3	(mainland China) Zhu Yawen	—	—	1	—	—	—	—	—	—		
4	(mainland China) Han Xue	—	—	—	1	—	—	—	—	—		
5	(mainland China) Zheng Yin	—	—	—	—	—	1	—	—	—		
6	(mainland China) Guo Degang	—	—	—	—	—	—	1	—	—		
7	(mainland China) Jinsong Wang	—	—	—	—	—	—	—	1	—		
8	(mainland China) Mei Ting	—	—	—	—	—	—	—	—	1		
9	(mainland China) Li Guangjie	—	—	—	—	—	—	—	—	2	—	—
10	(mainland China) Yunlong Liu	—	—	—	—	—	—	—	—	3	—	—
11	(mainland China) Bo Zhang	—	—	—	—	—	—	—	—	4	—	—
12	(mainland China) Guo Jingfei Guo	—	—	—	—	—	—	—	2	—	—	—
13	(mainland China) Tao Guo	—	—	—	—	—	—	—	3	—	—	—
14	(mainland China) Huang Zhizhong	—	—	—	—	—	—	—	4	—	—	—
15	(mainland China) Bao Jianfeng	—	—	—	—	—	—	2	—	—	—	—
16	(mainland China) Fan Ming	—	—	—	—	—	—	3	—	—	—	—
17	(United States) Wang Luoyong	—	—	—	—	—	—	4	—	—	—	—
18	(mainland China) Sun Qiang	—	—	—	—	—	2	—	—	—	—	—
19	(mainland China) Zhang Fengyi	—	—	—	—	—	3	—	—	—	—	—
20	(mainland China) Zuo Xiaoqing	—	—	—	—	—	4	—	—	—	—	—
21	(mainland China) Jiang Bian	—	—	—	—	2	—	—	—	—	—	—
22	(mainland China) Zhang Ruoyun	—	—	—	—	3	—	—	—	—	—	—
23	(mainland China) Lou Yixiao	—	—	—	—	4	—	—	—	—	—	—
24	(mainland China) Xu Fan	—	—	—	2	—	—	—	—	—	—	—
25	(mainland China) Sandra Ma	—	—	—	3	—	—	—	—	—	—	—
26	(Taiwan) Alyssa Chia	—	—	—	4	—	—	—	—	—	—	—
27	(mainland China) Di Tiānlín	—	—	2	—	—	—	—	—	—	—	—
28	(mainland China) Gao Yalin	—	—	3	—	—	—	—	—	—	—	—
29	(mainland China) Li Jian Yi	—	—	4	—	—	—	—	—	—	—	—
30	(mainland China) Tang Guoqiang	—	2	—	—	—	—	—	—	—	—	—
31	(mainland China) Chen Jianbin	—	3	—	—	—	—	—	—	—	—	—
32	(mainland China) Ning Jing	—	4	—	—	—	—	—	—	—	—	—
33	(mainland China) Yiwei Zhou	2	—	—	—	—	—	—	—	—	—	—
34	(mainland China) Pan Yueming	3	—	—	—	—	—	—	—	—	—	—
35	(mainland China) Zhang Xinyi	4	—	—	—	—	—	—	—	—	—	—
36	(mainland China) Ryan Zheng	—	—	—	—	1	—	—	—	—	—	—
