= Soundwave (app) =

Mobile application

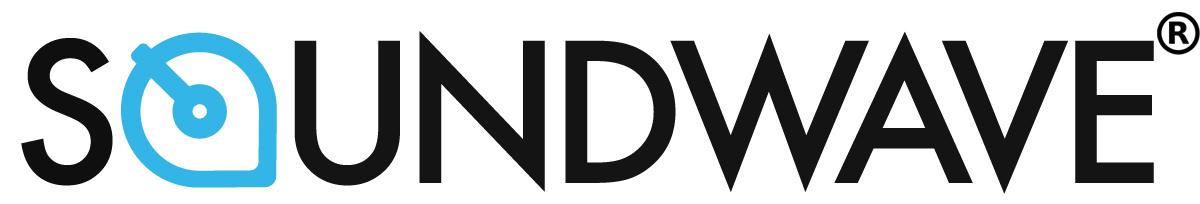
- Type: Mobile application
- Founder: Brendan O'Driscoll; Aidan Sliney; Craig Watson
- Headquarters: Dublin
- Parent: Spotify Technology S.A. (2016-present)
- Website: soundwave.com

Soundwave is a data collection company founded in 2012. It collected data on the music users listened to and their location in real-time. Users could subscribe to groups and locations to view and listen to relevant and trending songs. Soundwave was launched on June 20, 2013. Soundwave was acquired by Spotify in January 2016. Their former domain name is now registered through a domain privacy service and resolves to an unrelated website.

== History ==
Soundwave was founded in November 2013 by Brendan O'Driscoll and Aidan Sliney in Dublin, Ireland.

=== Launch ===
Soundwave was launched worldwide on iPhone and Android on June 20, 2013, in fourteen languages. It was downloaded in over 180 countries. An updated version was created to coincide with the launch of iOS 7.

On July 17, 2014, Soundwave launched Soundwave 2.0, introducing a new music messenger feature.

== Availability ==
As of January 2015, Soundwave was available for iOS and Android mobile devices. In 2014, Soundwave announced its availability for Android Wear which allowed users to share music on Twitter, view notifications, and follow users back on Soundwave.

== Acquisition by Spotify ==
In 2016, Soundwave was acquired by Spotify for an undisclosed sum.
