= Timmy Xu discography =

Xu Weizhou discography
- Studio albums: 3
- EPs: 4

This is the discography of Chinese actor and singer Timmy Xu (Chinese: 许魏洲). He has released three studio albums and four extended plays.

== Studio albums ==
Title	Album details	Sales
Light (光)	Released: May 1, 2016; Label: 极韵文化 (Pole Rhyme Culture); Formats: CD, digital download	CHN: 20,000 (phy.)
The Time (時·刻)	Released: July 5, 2018; Label: Baina Entertainment; Formats: CD, digital download, streaming	CHN: 15,000 (phy.)
CrossFever (交互热爱)	Released: February 7, 2024; Label: StarPower; Formats: CD + vinyl, digital download, streaming	

== Extended plays ==
English title	Album details	Sales
15 Minutes for Craziness	Released: August 10, 2017; Label: Baina Entertainment; Formats: Digital download, streaming; Track listing: 1. "So What"; 2. "Leave Me Alone"; 3. "Edge of Darkness"	CHN: 450,000 (dl.)
15 Minutes for Radiance	Released: October 20, 2017; Label: Baina Entertainment; Formats: Digital download, streaming; Track listing: 1. "Glory"; 2. "Between Us"; 3. "It's Always You"	—
15 Minutes for Monologue	Released: December 12, 2017; Label: Baina Entertainment; Formats: Digital download, streaming; Track listing: 1. "Confession (monologue)" 2. "Cat"	—
15 Minutes for Fantasy	Released: January 31, 2018; Label: Baina Entertainment; Formats: Digital download, streaming; Track listing: 1. "Orange Sky"; 2. "Maze"; 3. "Rio"	—

== Singles ==
English title	Chinese title	Year	Album
"Walk Slowly"	慢慢走	2016	Light
"Dust"	尘埃	2016	Light
"Moonlight"	月光	2016	Light
"I Remember Your Eyes"	—	2016	Light
"Understand the Dream" (featuring Zhu Yuanbing)	明白夢想	2016	Light
"Fun"	放	2016	Non-album single
"Leave Me Alone"	忘了我吧	2017	The Time
"So What"	那又怎样	2017	The Time
"It's Always You"	—	2017	The Time
"Orange Sky"	橙色天空	2018	The Time
"Edge of Darkness"	黑暗边缘	2018	The Time
"Everything About You"	—	2018	Non-album single
"Rainbow Arc"	彩虹弧线	2019	Non-album single
"Rebirth"	—	2019	Non-album single
"Snow"	沁园春·雪	2019	Non-album single
"Welcome to the World"	欢迎来到这世界	2020	CrossFever
"Fiery Youth" (with GAI)	炽热少年	2020	Non-album single
"Heavenly Mission"	天降大任	2020	Non-album single
"Easy Water Song"	易水歌	2021	Non-album single
"Detoxify"	解毒	2021	CrossFever
"Stay By My Side"	—	2021	CrossFever
"Chinese" (with Wu Tong)	龙族	2021	CrossFever
"I Wanna Be Your Lover" (with Five New Old)	—	2022	CrossFever
"Sunrise" (with Suffocated)	忘记日出	2022	CrossFever
"Spreading"	蔓延	2023	CrossFever
"Infinite Light"	无尽之光	2023	CrossFever
"Super Cool" (with Slot Machine)	—	2023	CrossFever
"Tomorrow"	明日光年	2023	CrossFever
"Toward Youth"	向青春	2023	Non-album single
"—" denotes releases that did not chart or were not released in that region.

== Music videos ==
List of music videos, showing year released and directors
English title	Chinese title	Year	Director(s)	Ref.
Walk Slowly	慢慢走	2016	Feng Liang	
Towards the Light	向着光亮那方	2016	Unknown	
Fun	放	2016	Unknown	
The Heroes	—	2017	Unknown	
Screaming Night	尖叫之夜	2017	Unknown	
Leave Me Alone	忘了我吧	2017	Pan Geng	
Ruins of Time	时光之墟	2017	Unknown	
So What	那又怎样	2017	Felix Cooper	
It's Always You	—	2017	Chen Man	
Maze	迷宫	2018	Unknown	
Orange Sky	橙色天空	2018	Kuang Sheng	
Edge of Darkness	黑暗边缘	2018	Feng Yu	
Everything About You	—	2018	Unknown	
New Era New Beijing New Youth New Accomplishment	未来已来	2018	Unknown	
Reply of Youth	青春的回答	2018	Unknown	
Do as Promise	说到做到	2019	Unknown	
Sunshine of Love	愛的陽光	2019	Unknown	
The Light	宇宙之光	2019	Unknown	
My Motherland and I	我和我的祖国	2019	Unknown	
Starry Oceans	星辰大海	2020	Unknown	
Fearless	无畏的模样	2020	Unknown	
Welcome to the World	欢迎来到这世界	2020	Liu Xuejun, Zhang Yuzhan	
Detoxify	解毒	2021	Wang Jue	
Wave	浪潮	2022	Unknown	
Singing to You	唱给你听	2022	Unknown	
Sunrise	忘记日出	2022	Unknown	
Tomorrow	明日光年	2023	Unknown	

== Soundtrack appearances ==
English title	Chinese title	Year	Notes
"Walk Slowly"	慢慢走	2016	Addicted soundtrack
"Because of the Sea"	海若有因	2016	Addicted soundtrack
"Towards the Light"	向着光亮那方	2016	Yesterday Once More soundtrack
"The Heroes"	—	2017	Snowtime soundtrack
"Screaming Night"	尖叫之夜	2017	iQiyi concert theme song
"Ruins of Time"	时光之墟	2017	S.M.A.R.T. Chase soundtrack
"Maze"	迷宫	2018	Maze Runner: The Death Cure promotional song
"The Light"	宇宙之光	2019	The Rookies theme song
"Ping Pong" (with Bai Jingting)	荣耀乒乓	2021	Ping Pong soundtrack
"Fiery Youth" (with GAI)	炽热少年	2021	Ping Pong soundtrack
"Rainbow Arc"	彩虹弧线	2021	Ping Pong soundtrack
"Summer Love" (with Qiao Xin)	见到你的盛夏	2021	The Romance theme song
"Unconfused Love"	不惑之爱	2022	City of Streamer soundtrack
"No One Called Hey" (Youth version) (with Duan Bowen, Cai Yida, Ding Guansen, Sun Xilun)	這裏沒人叫"喂"青春曲	2023	Ping Pong: The Triumph soundtrack
"—" denotes releases that did not chart or were not released in that region. Note: The Billboard China Top 100 and Billboard China Social Chart were launched in January 2019 by Billboard China

=== Other soundtracks ===
English title	Chinese title	Year	Notes	Ref.
New Era New Beijing New Youth New Accomplishment (with various artists)	未来已来	2018	Theme song for the China's Communist Youth League	
Reply of Youth	青春的回答	2018	Theme song for the China's 40 years of Reform Celebration	
Do as Promise (with various artists)	说到做到	2019	Theme song for the China's Youth Integrity Education	
Sunshine of Love (with various artists)	愛的陽光	2019	Project for the disabled people in China	
My Motherland and I (with Zhou Dongyu, Guan Xiaotong, Ma Tianyu, Ju Jingyi & Wei Daxun)	我和我的祖国	2019	Project for the People's Republic of China's 70th anniversary	
Morning light Sea	晨光海	2019	Project for the People's Republic of China's 70th anniversary	
Starry Oceans (with various artists)	星辰大海	2019	Theme song for the Movie Channel's Young Actors Plan	
Cherish	珍惜	2020	A tribute song to the frontliners fighting against the COVID-19	
Fearless (with Angelababy, Zheng Kai & Tang Yan)	无畏的模样	2020	Theme song in tribute to those in the frontline of the battle against COVID-19 in Shanghai	
Prologue World (2020) (with various artists)	世界序章 (2020)	2021		
Anti Scam	全民反诈	2021	Theme song for Anti Scam/Fraud by Crime Investigation Dept Ministry of Public Security of China	
Sing a Folk Song to the Party (Youth Version) (with various artists)	唱支山歌给党听	2021	Celebrate the 100th Anniversary of the Chinese Communist Party	
Little Poplar	小白杨	2021	Celebrate the 100th Anniversary of the Chinese Communist Party	
The Great Sage	大圣	2021	Theme song for the Wukong Cup China-Japan-Korea Youth Comic Contest	
Wave (with Victoria Song)	浪潮	2022	China Winter Sports album	
Singing to You	唱给你听	2022	China Youth Daily campaign for the 100th anniversary of Youth League China	
Full Moon Tonight (with Shange Wenjie)	月圆今宵	2022	CCTV Mid-Autumn Festival	
Story of Time	光阴的故事	2022	The 17th China Changchun Film Festival	
Sing to Dream	向梦而歌	2023	Tales of Happiness in China - Youku Documentary	
Return of the Wild Geese	归雁	2023	CCTV Spring Festival Program - New Rhyme and New Voices	
Never Forget (with Lan Tianqi)	念念不忘	2023	Theme song for the "China Red Sandalwood Museum" episode on Beijing Satellite TV's "Museum City"	
Road to Glory	光荣之路	2023	Theme song of Ping Pong: The Triumph at The 30th College Student Film Festival Youth Night	
That Winter We Walked Together (with Shange Wenjie)	那年冬天我们一起走过	2023	Song to commemorate first anninversary on the success of Beijing 2022 Winter Olympics	
For Love (with 刘芮麟 & 刘怡潼)	热爱	2024	Theme song of China Film Directors' Night (2024 中国电影导演之夜)	
