= Love After Addiction =

2026 Chinese Boys' Love web series

- Genre: Drama; Romance; Boys' Love
- Written by: Nattachai Jiraanont
- Directed by: Nattachai Jiraanont
- Country of origin: China
- Original language: Mandarin
- No. of seasons: 1
- No. of episodes: 12

Production
- Running time: 25 minutes

Original release
- Network: GagaOOLala
- Release: 6 February – 7 March 2026

Love After Addiction (Chinese: 许你十年), also known as Xu Ni Shi Nian, is a 2026 Chinese romantic drama web series with a Boys' Love (BL) theme. A spin-off of Addicted (2016), the series stars Lin Feng Song and Chen Wen in the leading roles. It premiered on GagaOOLala in February 2026.

== Plot ==
You Xi, also known as Yoki, is a celebrated actor whose career collapses following scandals and chronic insomnia. He reconnects with Yang Meng, a former schoolmate now working as a rescue captain, and discovers that he can only sleep when beside him. What begins as a calculated dependency soon evolves into a complex and emotional relationship, exploring themes of trust, addiction, and love.

== Cast ==
=== Main ===
- Lin Feng Song as You Xi / Yoki
- Chen Wen as Yang Meng

=== Supporting ===
- Hu Heran as Ye Ran
- Wang Peiwei as Xu Che

== Production ==
The series was announced in 2025 as part of the expansion of Chinese BL productions. Overseas Idol highlighted Lin Feng Song's debut as a lead actor and his reunion with Chen Wen after a decade.

== Broadcast ==
Love After Addiction aired from 6 February to 7 March 2026, with weekly episodes released on Fridays and Saturdays. Each episode runs approximately 25 minutes and is available internationally on GagaOOLala.

== Reception ==
On MyDramaList, the series received an average rating of 7.7/10 based on more than 1,300 user reviews. Alt Selection described the series as one of the most promising Chinese BL productions of 2026, while The BL Xpress emphasized the intensity of the romance and its mature exploration of addiction and dependency. Sina articles also covered the release, noting the cultural impact of the series and the return of familiar actors to the BL genre.
