= Towards the Light (song) =

Single by Xu Weizhou
- Released: 2 May 2016
- Recorded: 2016
- Genre: Soundtrack
- Label: 光线易视
- Songwriters: Tintin Zhang; Chen Yu
- Producer: Liu Tong

Xu Weizhou singles chronology
"Towards the Light" (2016)	"Fun" (2016)

Music video
- "Towards the Light" on YinYueTai

Towards the Light (Chinese: 向着光亮那方) a.k.a. "Towards the Bright Side" is a song recorded by Chinese singer Xu Weizhou. The debut single was officially released on 2 May 2016 as one of the promotional songs of the film Yesterday Once More

== Background ==
Towards the Light is a soundtrack with a length of four minutes and thirty seconds. It pertains to the struggles and passion of youths. Its music video was first released on 21 April 2016 for the promotion of the film Yesterday Once More but the single was officially released on 2 May 2016. It gained praise and it was the first time a song achieved top spots on both China V chart and Mandarin chart in Billboard China at the same week.

Xu Weizhou performed the song live on his "First Light Asia Tour" with the other songs from his album Light. Afterwards, he performed it on music festivals such as Forest Music Festival, Zebra Music Festival and 20th PEACEBIRD Music Festival on late 2016.

== Composition ==
This single was composed by Chen Yu while the lyrics was written by Tintin Zhang. It was produced by Liu Tong, vice president of Beijing Enlight Pictures and the writer of the said movie. Liu stated that they chose Xu to sing Towards the Light because they think he is very suitable for it and "it also wasn't easy for him to be known by people, but because of certain policy reasons, he was being suppressed"; pertaining to the ban of Xu to appear on television shows by SAPPRFT but Liu added that people can't blame the higher-ups because things got out of control. He also added that "...even though he is in this state right now, he will definitely still head towards the direction of the light and become better and better".

== Chart performance ==
=== Weekly ===
Chart (2016)	Peak position
China V Chart	1
Billboard Radio China Chart	1

=== Year-end ===
Chart (2016)	Position
China V Chart	9
