= Fun (Xu Weizhou song) =

Single by Xu Weizhou
- Released: 8 December 2016
- Recorded: 2016
- Genre: C-pop; Rock Music
- Length: 3:39
- Label: Sony Music China
- Songwriters: Zhao Dengkai; Xu Weizhou
- Producer: Shi Xiaopeng

Xu Weizhou singles chronology
"Towards the Light" (2016)	"Fun" (2016)	"Leave Me Alone" (2017)

Music video
- "Fun" on YouTube

Fun (Chinese: 放, Pinyin: Fàng) a.k.a. "Release" is a song recorded by Chinese singer-songwriter Xu Weizhou. The single was released on 8 December 2016 which was composed by Xu Weizhou himself while the lyrics were written by Zhao Dengkai.

== Background and release ==
Fun, a pop rock song with a length of three minutes and thirty-nine seconds was officially released on 8 December 2016. This single was composed by Xu Weizhou himself and was arranged and produced by Shi Xiaopeng, lead guitarist of the band Cold Air. The music video was officially released on 15 December which has 2 versions, first was the "Laneige" version including a short interview of Xu Weizhou to promote the product whereas he was the endorser at that time and the second one, which was the official version was released at "Yinyuetai", Sina Weibo and YouTube. Xu flew to South Korea to shoot the music video together with a South Korean team.

== Credits and personnel ==
- Xu Weizhou – composer, lead vocals
- Shi Xiaopeng – producer
- Zhao Dengkai – lyricist
- Wang Qingtao & Wang Chen – engineering
- Chen Bohao – mastering
- Zhu Yin – string compilation
- Zhang Bo & Zhang Zhangkai – harmony

== Live performances ==
On 23 December 2016, Xu was invited to Shanghai Disneyland Christmas Party and performed the song live for the first time. Later on, he performed the verses of "Fun" and his other song "Light" during the 24th Oriental Billboard Award Ceremony and 2017 Sakura Muse Music Festival. On 1 April 2017, he performed "Fun" during his appearance as a guest to a television music show Global Chinese Music Chart currently airing on CCTV15, 2017 Music Radio China Top Ranking Awards on 21 June, 2017 Asian Music Gala Awards on 19 July 2017 MTV Global Chinese Music Awards on 20 July and 2017 iQiyi Screaming Night Concert on 19 August.

== Chart performance ==
=== Weekly ===
Chart (2016–17)	Peak position
QQ Music Chart	1
Fresh Asia Music Chart	1
Pop Songs Chart	1
Billboard Radio China Chart	2
China V Chart	1

=== Year-end ===
Chart (2016–17)	Peak position
China V Chart	6
Fresh Asia Music Chart	9
