= Stay with Me (2023 TV series) =

Chinese television series

- Promotional poster
- Also known as: Innocent Playmates / 三小无猜 (San Xiao Wu Cai)
- Simplified Chinese: 哥哥你别跑
- Hanyu Pinyin: Ge Ge Ni Bie Pao
- Genre: Romance; Youth; Danmei (Boy's love
- Based on: Are You Addicted? by Chai Ji Dan
- Written by: Chai Ji Dan
- Screenplay by: Zan A
- Directed by: Su You Chen
- Starring: Xu Bin; Zhang Jiong Min; Gao Zi Qi; Yang Shuo; Sun Yi Chen; Duan Qing Qing; Xiao Huan; Wu Cheng Ze; Zhu Zi Yan
- Opening theme: "The Meaning of Family" (家人的意义)
- Ending theme: "Mi La" (米拉)
- Country of origin: China
- Original language: Mandarin
- No. of seasons: 1
- No. of episodes: 24

Production
- Production location: China
- Running time: 35 minutes
- Production companies: Feibao Media; Ri Yue Wei Ming Media

Original release
- Network: GagaOOLala; Youku International; Viki
- Release: 7 July – 12 August 2023

Related
- Addicted (web series); Are You Addicted? novel

Stay With Me (simplified Chinese: 哥哥你别跑; traditional Chinese: 哥哥你別跑; pinyin: gēge nǐ biépǎo; lit. ''Brother', 'don't run!'') is a 2023 danmei Chinese television drama starring Xu Bin and Zhang Jiong Min, directed by Su You Chen and written by Chai Ji Dan. It is based on the famous boy's love (BL) Chinese novel Are You Addicted? (你丫上瘾了) by the same author Chai Jidan.

The series aired on Taiwan's GagaOOLala platform and Viki International from July 7 until August 12, 2023. Due to the Chinese government's strict policy on promoting boy's love content, the series is currently not licensed to broadcast widely on the mainland China, although the crew and sets were all filmed entirely in China.

This drama is also considered a remake version of the 2016 BL Chinese streaming television series, Addicted, because the plot is similar and both were written by Chai Ji Dan.

== Synopsis ==
Su Yu (Zhang Jiong Min) is a high school student. He lives with his single father. And although his tiny family has no money, he is reasonably happy. That is all shattered the day his mother remarries a rich man. This puts him on a collision course with his new step-brother Wu Bi (Xu Bin), who also turns out to be his new classmate. The two clash right from the start, due mainly to the fact that they have such different personalities. Su Yu is a cold and arrogant top student, while Wu Bi is an unreasonable underachiever.

After getting off on the wrong foot, their explosive relationship takes a turn. But just as the bond between Su Yu and Wu Bi grows stronger, a whole range of obstacles comes their way, challenging their feelings for each other.

== Cast and characters ==
=== Main ===
Actor	Role	Introduction
Zhang Jiong Min: 6-years-old: Wang Han Zhe; 12-years-old: Xue Bo Wen	Su Yu	Su Yu, a high school student who lives a simple life with his naive father, faces a major change when his mother, Xiao San, remarries a rich man, Wu Zheng Hao. He is a cold and arrogant top student.
Xu Bin: Young: Lou Jia Hui	Wu Bi	Contrast with Su Yu, Wu Bi is an unreasonable underachiever student. Tlthough he appears stubborn on the outside, inside he always feels a lack of family affection. Since accidentally transferring to Su Yu's class, he has caused many obstacles for Su Yu. However, after moving in with Su Yu's family, his feelings for Su Yu grew deeper and deeper. And the lack of family affection inside him was gradually filled, which made his relationship with Su Yu's family members also closer.

=== Supporting ===
==== People around Su Yu ====
Actor	Role	Introduction
Yang Shuo	Su Zhi Gang	Su Yu's father
Zhu Zi Yan	Xiao San	Su Yu's mother and Wu Zhenghao's wife
Duan Qing Qing	Zhou Li	Su Yu's neighbor, later marries Su Zhi Gang and becomes Su Yu's stepmother. She owns a food stall. As a gentle, calm and diligent person, she always cares for and cares for the whole family. She always considered Su Yu and Wu Bi as her children.
Sun Yi Chen	Li Dou	Daughter of Zhou Li. Though she is still a kid, she is extremely smart and mischievous. Both Su Yu and Wu Bi loved this little girl very much.
Xiao Huan	Han Bo Kuang	Su Yu's close childhood friend. Student of Class 4
Wu Cheng Ze	Mao Chong	Su Yu's new close friend and deskmate.
Jin You Mei	Ye Wan Ying	Su Yu's ex-girlfriend, previous school belle. Before moving to America, she was Su Yu's classmate and they both had feelings for each other, although Su Yu actively refused her due to his inferiority complex. Later, returning to China as a girlfriend of Mo Yi (Wu Bi's cousin), she still deliberately seduced Su Yu and caused a misunderstanding between Su Yu and Wu Bi.
Dong Yu Fei	Guo Xiaorou	She is Han Bo Kuang's classmate and crush, although Mao Chong is the one she likes.
Wang Xi He	Xiao Wu	Li Duo's friend
Ling Zhen He	Han Bokuang's father	
Han Bo Wei	Su Yu's Homeroom Teacher	
Liang Xiao Ling	Xiao Wu's mother	

==== People around Wu Bi ====
Actor	Role	Introduction
Gao Zi Qi	Wu Zheng Hao	Wu Bi's father
Birgit	Mo Yi	Wu Bi's older cousin, son of Wu Bi's second older uncle. He works at Wu Bi's father's company, and is a cold and cruel young businessman.
Dong Zi Fan	Da Wen	The first rich classmate at Wu Bi's old school.
Guo Hao Yu	Er Yi	The second rich classmate at Wu Bi's old school.
Ning Xiao Hua	Wu Bi's fake father	

=== Guest ===
- Hu Yuan Jun as Wu Bi's Mother, died when he was a little boy.
- Liu Xiao Hui as Wu Bi's little aunt

== Episodes ==
No.	Title	Original release date
1	"Episode 1"	July 7, 2023 (GagaOOLala)
Wu Bi switches schools and ends up in the same class as Su Yu, but the two of them don't hit it off when they first meet.
2	"Episode 2"	July 7, 2023 (GagaOOLala)
Wu Bi runs away from home and lives on his own because of a fight with his father, but because of this he meets a new friend.
3	"Episode 3"	July 8, 2023 (GagaOOLala)
Wu Bi realizes that the person who helped him move is actually Su Yu's father. Moreover, because of an accident, Wu Bi and Su Yu start to understand each other.
4	"Episode 4"	July 8, 2023 (GagaOOLala)
Wu Bi and Su Yu start sharing stories about their mothers, and Wu Bi also mentions a sculpture that looks just like Su Yu.
5	"Episode 5"	July 14, 2023 (GagaOOLala)
Wu Bi learns that Su Yu had a past relationship with a female classmate Ye Wanying, which makes Wu Bi extremely curious.
6	"Episode 6"	July 14, 2023 (GagaOOLala)
Wu Bi is worried that his lie will be discovered by Su Yu, so he thinks of a way to cover it up.
7	"Episode 7"	July 15, 2023 (GagaOOLala)
Su Yu accidentally realizes Wu Bi's secret, which leads to the relationship between them to reach a standstill.
8	"Episode 8"	July 15, 2023 (GagaOOLala)
A photo of Su Yu meeting his mother goes viral, which he blames on Wu Bi. As a result, the two of them get into a heated argument.
9	"Episode 9"	July 21, 2023 (GagaOOLala)
Su Yu sees that his dad has feelings for Auntie Zhou, so he gives his dad an idea.
10	"Episode 10"	July 21, 2023 (GagaOOLala)
Wu Bi rents a place near Su Yu's home, and apart from giving the rest of the family more living space, the two of them start living together.
11	"Episode 11"	July 22, 2023 (GagaOOLala)
Wu Bi's cousin returns from abroad, but it turns out that his cousin's girlfriend is actually Su Yu's old classmate Ye Wanying.
12	"Episode 12"	July 22, 2023 (GagaOOLala)
Wu Bi and Ye Wanying reach an agreement, but Ye Wanying uses other means to instigate drama between Wu Bi and Su Yu.
13	"Episode 13"	July 28, 2023 (GagaOOLala)
Ye Wanying's lies are uncovered, and Su Yu says goodbye to her. Meanwhile, Su Yu questions his mother about the statue.
14	"Episode 14"	July 28, 2023 (GagaOOLala)
Wu Bi's father becomes enraged when learning that Wu Bi is living with Su Yu, and goes directly to Wu Bi to find out the truth.
15	"Episode 15"	July 29, 2023 (GagaOOLala)
Su Yu's mother realizes that Duo Duo and her son are close, so she decides to figure out a way of getting closer to Duo Duo.
16	"Episode 16"	July 29, 2023 (GagaOOLala)
Wu Bi sees that Su Yu's father is having trouble finding the right storefront, so he secretly devises a plan to help.
17	"Episode 17"	August 4, 2023 (GagaOOLala)
When Su Yu and his own mother start investigating the truth behind Wu Bi's mother's passing, more and more information comes to light.
18	"Episode 18"	August 4, 2023 (GagaOOLala)
Su Yu arrives at Wu Bi's uncle's residence, but has no way of getting inside.
19	"Episode 19"	August 5, 2023 (GagaOOLala)
Su Yu and Wu Bi celebrate each other's birthdays, and give each other special gifts.
20	"Episode 20"	August 5, 2023 (GagaOOLala)
Duo Duo finds a piece of paper within the statue that Wu Bi's mother made, and Su Yu and Wu Bi realize that it's an important piece of evidence.
21	"Episode 21"	August 11, 2023 (GagaOOLala)
Wu Bi accepts his cousin's request to go abroad, which results in him being forced to spend time apart from Su Yu.
22	"Episode 22"	August 11, 2023 (GagaOOLala)
Wu Bi successfully gets his drivers' license, and he and Su Yu go for a ride together to wherever Su Yu wants to go.
23	"Episode 23"	August 12, 2023 (GagaOOLala)
In order for Wu Bi to get into a good school, Su Yu tutors him, but Wu Bi's cousin refuses to let go of Wu Bi's plans for the future.
24	"Episode 24"	August 12, 2023 (GagaOOLala)
Wu Bi sees his cousin being kind to Su Yu and feels like something isn't right, so he warns Su Yu to keep his distance.

== Original soundtrack ==
No.	Title	Singers	Length
1.	"The Meaning of Family (家人的意义)" (Opening theme song)	Xu Bin, Zhang Jiong Min & Sun Yi Chen
2.	"Mi La (米拉)" (Ending theme song)	Xu Bin & Zhang Jiong Min
3.	"Shining Stars (星辰闪耀)"	Xu Bin
4.	"Guard (守候)"	Xu Bin
