= Chai Jidan =

Writer from mainland China

- 柴雞蛋
- Born: Zhu Wenjiao 朱文嬌; People's Republic of China
- Citizenship: People's Republic of China
- Occupations: Writer, screenwriter, producer, and director
- Writing career
- Notable works: Are You Addicted?, Advance Bravely, Counter Attack, Feng Mang.

Chinese name
- Simplified Chinese: 柴鸡蛋
- Traditional Chinese: 柴雞蛋
Transcriptions
Standard Mandarin
- Hanyu Pinyin: Chái Jīdàn

Chai Jidan (born Zhu Wenjiao) is a Chinese writer who is known for her works in the Boys' love (BL) genre. She is also a screenwriter, producer, and director from mainland China. Her notable works include Are You Addicted? (Heroin), Advance Bravely, Counter Attack and Feng Mang.

== Major works ==
Her work Are You Addicted? (Heroin) was adapted into a 15-episode TV drama series titled Addicted in 2016. However, it was removed from major streaming platforms including its original release platform, iQIYI, and Tencent Video, less than a month after its release following intervention by Chinese media regulators. In 2023, Chai returned to the same story with Stay With Me, a remake of Are You Addicted?. The series was streamed on platforms including GagaOOLala and Viki, making it accessible to audiences in multiple countries, though it remained largely unavailable in mainland China. In 2025, another work by Chai Jidan, Counter Attack, was adapted into a 24-episode TV drama series titled Revenged Love, which was broadcast in Hong Kong, Japan, and various overseas regions, including Europe and the United States.
