= It's Always You (Xu Weizhou song) =

Single by Xu Weizhou

from the album The Time
- Released: 20 October 2017
- Recorded: 2017
- Genre: EDM
- Length: 3:18
- Label: Baina Entertainment
- Songwriters: Lee McCutcheon; Jeremy Thurber
- Producer: Lee McCutcheon

Xu Weizhou singles chronology
"So What" (2017)	"It's Always You" (2017)

Music video
- "It's Always You" on YinYueTai

It's Always You is a song recorded and composed by Chinese singer-songwriter Xu Weizhou. It is the third single released from Xu's album "The Time". It is included in the second quarter of the album.

== Background and release ==
It's Always You is composed and produced by Lee McCutcheon with the assistance of Jeremy Thurber in lyrical writing. It has a length of three minutes and eighteen seconds. It is the third single released from Xu's album "The Time" and is included in its 2nd quarter. It is Xu's first attempt at singing EDM and his second pure English song next to "I Remember Your Eyes". The whole quarter was officially released on 20 October 2017; same day of his 23rd birthday for free online. The official music video was directed by Chen Man and was released on 31 October at several Chinese streaming sites.

Upon its release, netizens praised the improvement of Xu's English pronunciation. The music video has topped the Billboard China V Chart consecutively for 2 weeks.

Xu performed the song live for the first time during his "Light 2017" concert on 9 December.

== Credits and personnel ==
Credits were adapted from the official music video.

- Star Power (Beijing) Culture Media Co., Ltd and Timmy Xu Studio – presentation, production
- Lee McCutcheon – producer, composer, lyricist, music arrangement, backing vocals, backing vocals arrangement
- Jeremy Thurber – lyricist, backing vocals, backing vocals arrangement
- Xu Weizhou – lead vocals
- Chen Man – director, music video producer
- Gabrielle – executive director / D.O.P.
- Li Hao – executive producer
- Mia Shen, Haruki Gao, Kary Tsui – video production crews
- Paul Gatehouse – mixing engineer
- Wildtone London – mixing studio

== Chart performance ==
=== Weekly ===
Chart (2017)	Peak position
Billboard Radio China Chart	7
China V Chart	1
