= So What (Xu Weizhou song) =

Single by Xu Weizhou

from the album The Time
- Released: 10 August 2017
- Recorded: 2017
- Genre: C-pop
- Length: 3:55
- Label: Baina Entertainment
- Songwriters: Zhang Chang; Xu Weizhou
- Producer: Lee Shih Shiong

Xu Weizhou singles chronology
"Leave Me Alone" (2017)	"So What" (2017)	"It's Always You" (2017)

Music video
- "So What" on YouTube

So What (Chinese: 那又怎样, Pinyin: Nà yòu zěnyàng) is a song recorded and composed by Chinese singer-songwriter Xu Weizhou. It is the second single released from Xu's album "The Time".

== Background and release ==
So What is a pop song with a length of three minutes and fifty-five seconds. It was composed by Xu Weizhou himself and the lyrics were written by Zhang Chang. It is included in 1st quarter of "The Time". The whole quarter was officially released on 10 August 2017 while the official music video was released on 11 September at several Chinese streaming sites as well as YouTube. Its music video was shot in London.

Xu performed the song live for the first time during the iQiyi Screaming Night Concert on 19 August 2017.

== Credits and personnel ==
Credits were adapted from the official music video.

- Star Power (Beijing) Culture Media Co., Ltd and Timmy Xu Studio – presentation, production
- Baina Entertainment – digital distribution
- Lee Shih Shiong – producer
- Xu Weizhou – composer, lead vocals
- Zhang Chang – lyricist
- Derek Chua – music arrangement
- Li Hao – executive producer
- Felix Cooper – director
- Li Bo – editor
- Wang Gang – colorist
- David Tan – backing vocals, backing vocals arrangement
- Liao Zhengxing – A&R
- Rachel Xie – line producer
- Zhou Caoyuan, Li Chen Chen – dubbing assistant
- Zhangjin – make-up
- Li Kunmo – stylist

== Chart performance ==
=== Weekly ===
Chart (2017)	Peak position
Billboard Radio China Chart	4
China V Chart	3
Fresh Asia Music Chart	4
