= Ping Pong (TV series) =

2021 Chinese sport series

- Traditional Chinese: 榮耀乒乓
- Simplified Chinese: 荣耀乒乓
- Hanyu Pinyin: Róngyào Pīngpāng
- Genre: Sport; Slice of life
- Written by: Li Jia
- Directed by: Li Jia
- Starring: Bai Jingting; Timmy Xu
- Country of origin: China
- Original language: Mandarin
- No. of episodes: 44

Production
- Executive producers: Dai Ying; An Rong
- Running time: 45 minutes
- Production companies: iQIYI; Dream Media; Give Me Five

Original release
- Network: iQIYI
- Release: 9 March – 8 April 2021

Ping Pong (Chinese: 荣耀乒乓; pinyin: Róngyào Pīngpāng) is a 2021 Chinese television series starring Bai Jingting and Timmy Xu. The series depicts the lives of professional table tennis players who strives to represent their sport on the world stage. On 9 March 2021, it got released on iQIYI. The series was listed in the 32nd Huading Awards "Top 100 Chinese TV Drama Satisfaction Survey". On 17 February 2023, the movie Ping Pong: The Triumph was released after its success.

== Synopsis ==
Two players stand at the center of ongoing ping-pong competitions. Xu Tan, physically weak but highly committed, and Yu Kenan, talented yet unconventional, approach the sport from contrasting backgrounds. Despite their differences, their careers follow similar paths during a key period in Chinese table tennis. Guided by his grandfather, Xu Tan begins playing to improve his health and gradually earns recognition. Yu Kenan, a leading athlete from a well-known sports family, realizes that natural ability alone is not enough. Driven by their ambitions and a shared sense of duty, the two eventually face off in the most important match of their careers.

== Cast ==
=== Main cast ===
- Bai Jingting as Xu Tan
- Timmy Xu as Yu Kenan

=== Supporting cast ===
- Wan Guopeng as Liu Shi: A competitive team member
- Shen Nan as Wang Siheng: Team manager at University, Xu Tan's girlfriend
- Liu Zhibing as Lei Cheng: The national table tennis coach, Xu Tan's mentor
- Wang Jianxin as Teng Biao: Yu Kenan's mentor and coach
- Hong Bingyao as Zhang Caiwei: National team member, Yu Kenan's girlfriend
- Zhang Yang as Fang Yue: Former national table tennis team member and coach, mentored Xu Tan in the later years of his career
- Yu Lang as Lei Lei: Lei Cheng's daughter, Xu Tan's childhood crush
- Fang Xiaoli as Zhu Meiwei: Lei Lei's mother
- Bian Yiming as Fu Jingchun: Team member, retired due to injury.
- Julin as Big Liu: Physical training coach for the national team
- Gao Dongping as Zheng Hao: National team coach, mentor of Fu Jingchun
- Xu Seng as Qin Zhen: National team coach, Liu Shi's mentor
- Zhao Chengshun as Fu Chuanzhi: National team coach
- Isa as Yuan Ran: Team doctor, Liu Shi's girlfriend
- Kong Lin as Lin Di: Xu Tan's mother
- Guo Qiucheng as Xu Zhankun: Xu Tan's father
- Dong Chengming as Lin Haozhi: Former trainee who withdrew early, later met Xu Tan at university
- Qin Yijia as Xiao Jun: Team member, a friend of Zhang Caiwei
- Du Shuangyu as Ma Chuan: Team Member

== Soundtrack ==
Title	Artist	Lyrics/Composer
"Glory Ping Pong" (Theme Song)	Bai Jingting, Timmy Xu	Ren Yajing, Li Yan, Hu Haobo
"Youth Like You" (Ending Theme Song)	Unine	Ren Yajing, Lü Qing, Liu Suyi
"Dream Chaser"	Hu Xia	Ren Yajing, Li Yan, Hu Haobo
"One Left, One Right“	Bai Jingting	Ren Yajing, Li Yan, Lan Tianxiao
"Rainbow Arc"	Timmy Xu	Shi Xiaopeng
"Our Ten Years"	Zhou Yan	Ren Yajing, Sun Wei
"Hot Boy"	Zhou Yan, Timmy Xu	Zhou Yan, Lao Dao

== Production ==
The series was filmed from November 2018 to May 2019 in Shenzhen. Bai Jingting gained weight and practiced table tennis to accurately portray his role, performing all related scenes himself. In 2023, Timmy Xu reprised his role in the movie Ping Pong: The Triumph.

== Awards and nominations ==
Year	Award	Category	Work	Status	Ref.
2021	2nd Screen Integration Communication Ceremony	Vibrant Actors on Screen	Bai Jingting	Won	
2021	32nd Huading Awards	Top 100 Chinese TV Series in Satisfaction Survey	Ping Pong	Listed	
2022	Weibo Movie Night	Potential Actor of the Year	Timmy Xu	Won	
2022	Weibo TV & Internet Video Summit 2022	Breakout Actor of the Year	Timmy Xu	Won	
