= Leave Me Alone (Xu Weizhou song) =

Single by Xu Weizhou

from the album The Time
- Released: 10 August 2017
- Recorded: 2017
- Genre: C-pop
- Length: 4:05
- Label: Baina Entertainment
- Songwriters: Yang Jie; Tang Hanxiao
- Producer: Lee Shih Shiong

Xu Weizhou singles chronology
"Fun" (2016)	"Leave Me Alone" (2017)	"So What" (2017)

Music video
- "Leave Me Alone" on YouTube

Leave Me Alone (Chinese: 忘了我吧, Pinyin: Wàngle wǒ ba) a.k.a. "Forget Me" is a single by Chinese singer-songwriter Xu Weizhou from his album "The Time". It is included in the 1st quarter of the album.

== Background and release ==
Leave Me Alone, a pop song with a length of four minutes and five seconds is a song about break-up and letting go of the past. It is included in the 1st quarter of "The Time". The whole quarter was officially released on 10 August 2017 while the official music video was released on 21 August at several Chinese streaming sites and YouTube and quickly rose to charts. In September, it rose to first place on its 3rd week at Billboard China real-time chart.

Xu Weizhou performed the song live for the first time on 27 August during the 2017 Fresh Asia Music Awards.

== Music video ==
=== Background ===
The official music video was shot in London together with a Chinese and Londoner team. Xu flew to Paris for Louis Vuitton S/S 2018 Men's Paris Fashion Week on 22 June and went to London later to shoot his music videos for "Leave Me Alone" and "So What".

=== Synopsis ===
The music video opens with Xu holding an umbrella and standing on the banks of the River Thames. As the song starts, Xu is seen lying on bed unmotivated. He finally got up but he is grieving i.e. crying while eating plain bread and breaking plates. As he was eating the bread, he remembered their happy times together. He saw the doll they bought and the camera they used while taking pictures of each other. He revisited the store where they bought the doll and saw a single piece. He brought his other doll and placed it beside the lone piece. He finally threw all the pictures they took together and broke down crying. Lastly, there was a flashback scene where they had a date at the riverbank. He went to that place again, as seen on the opening scene and let go of his umbrella. He smiled while leaving that place finally letting go of the past. Xu, wearing a black shirt with a black background, singing along with each scene.

== Credits and personnel ==
Credits were adapted from the official music video.

- Star Power (Beijing) Culture Media Co., Ltd and Timmy Xu Studio – presentation
- Geocast TV – production
- Baina Entertainment – digital distribution
- Lee Shih Shiong – producer
- Tang Hanxiao – composer, music arrangement
- Yang Jie – lyricist
- A chaos – music arrangement, guitarist
- Li Hao – executive producer
- Yang Tian, Chen Hengxiao and Wu Yaxian – co-producers
- Pan Geng – director
- Liao Zhengxing – A&R
- David Tan – backing vocals, backing vocals arrangement
- Zhou Caoyuan, Li Chen Chen – dubbing assistant
- Zhangjin – make-up & hair
- Li Kunmo – stylist

== Chart performance ==
=== Weekly ===
Chart (2017)	Peak position
Billboard Radio China Chart	2
China V Chart	2
Fresh Asia Music Chart	2
