= Ping Pong: The Triumph =

2023 Chinese sports drama film

- Theatrical release poster
- Chinese: 中国乒乓之绝地反击
- Literally: China's table tennis counterattack
- Directed by: Deng Chao; Yu Baimei
- Written by: Yu Baimei; Pei Liu; Hui Meng
- Starring: Deng Chao; Sun Li; Timmy Xu
- Cinematography: Max Da-Yung Wang
- Edited by: Ballu Saluja
- Music by: Andrew Kawczynski
- Production company: Hengye Pictures
- Distributed by: China Lion Film Distribution
- Release date: 17 February 2023
- Running time: 137 minutes
- Country: China
- Language: Chinese
- Box office: US$14.1 million

Ping Pong: The Triumph (Chinese: 中国乒乓之绝地反击) is a 2023 Chinese sports drama film starring Deng Chao, Sun Li and Timmy Xu. The story draws inspiration from a true incident centered on table tennis coach Cai Zhenhua who assembled five talented players at the 1995 World Championships. The film was developed following the success of the 2021 television series Ping Pong.

== Plot ==
Set between 1992 and 1995, the story follows a table tennis coach inspired by Cai Zhenhua, who returns from abroad determined to make a difference. Under his leadership, five players — Ding Song, Ma Wenge, Wang Tao, Liu Guoliang, and Kong Linghui; come together in Tianjin, where they embark on a remarkable journey culminating in a dramatic comeback at the World Championships.

== Cast ==
- Deng Chao as Dai Minjia: based on Cai Zhenhua
- Sun Li as Wang Ying
- Timmy Xu as Bai Minhe: based on Ma Wenge
- Duan Bowen as Huang Zhao: based on Wang Tao
- Cai Yida as Gong Feng: based on Ding Song
- Ding Guansen as Hou Zhuoxiang: based on Liu Guoliang
- Sun Xilun as Dong Shuai: based on Kong Linghui
- Wu Jing as Da Li: based on Xi Enting
- Yu Haoming as Wang Yao: based on Wang Hao

== Release ==
On 24 January 2023, the film was initially released; after a moderate initial response, it shifted to limited viewing the next day. Later, it was re-released on 17 February 2023.

On 14 November 2024, it was dubbed and distributed in Italy under the title Ping Pong: Il Ritorno by Imago Communication; marking a European Premiere.

== Reception ==
James Marsh of South China Morning Post rated the film 3/5, stated "Ping Pong: The Triumph is a slick, polished production fueled by national pride and nostalgia. The spirited ensemble keeps us invested in the individual challenges and struggles faced by the team. While not a classic, it should get its intended audience on its feet". Carla Hay of Culture Mix stated "Ping Pong: The Triumph is more than about winning games. It's a predictable underdog story with a rather bland screenplay, but the action scenes are well filmed and keep viewers interested".

== Soundtrack ==
""No One Called "Hey"""

Song by Lorne Balfe and Andrew Kawczynski
- Released: January 20, 2023
- Length: 4:35
- Label: East Asia Record Production Company Limited
- Songwriter: Tang Tian
- Producer: Yu Fei

Official video
- Ping Pong: The Triumph - Song on YouTube

== Accolades ==
Award	Category	Recipient	Result	Ref.
Golden Rooster Awards	Best Picture	Ping Pong: The Triumph	Nominated	
Golden Rooster Awards	Best Director	Deng Chao & Yu Baimei	Nominated	
Golden Rooster Awards	Best Art Direction	Huo Tingxiao	Nominated	
Golden Rooster Awards	Best Sound Recording	Feng Yanming & Lin Xuelin	Nominated	
