= The Time (Xu Weizhou album) =

Studio album by Xu Weizhou
- Released: July 5, 2018
- Recorded: 2017
- Genre: C-pop; rock; EDM
- Label: Baina Entertainment

Xu Weizhou chronology
Light (2016)	The Time (2018)

Singles from The Time
- 1. "Leave Me Alone" Released: August 10, 2017; 2. "So What" Released: August 10, 2017; 3. "It's Always You" Released: October 20, 2017; 4. "Orange Sky" Released: January 31, 2018; 5. "Edge of Darkness" Released: April 2, 2018

The Time is the second album and first full-length studio album of Chinese singer-songwriter Xu Weizhou. It is divided into four parts.

== Background and release ==
1st Quarter — 15 Minutes for Craziness:

The Time · 1st quarter album cover

The 1st quarter consists of 3 songs, namely: "So What", "Leave Me Alone" and "Edge of Darkness". It was produced by Lee Shih Shiong.

Timmy Xu Studio shared a 37-second highlight medley teaser of the 3 songs on August 6, 2017. Pre-sale has started on August 8 and was officially released on August 10. The album reached platinum record status in just 3 minutes and 3 seconds and in a day, it has sold over 400,000 copies earning a double platinum record. The day of its release, The Time album ranked first on QQ Music real-time chart and the online topic "Xu Weizhou The Time" reached more than 100 million reading within an hour.

The official music video of "Leave Me Alone" was released on August 21 while "So What" on September 11 at several Chinese streaming sites as well as YouTube. Both music video were shot in London. On April 2, 2018, the official music video of "Edge of Darkness" was released exclusively through the NetEase Music streaming service.

2nd Quarter — 15 Minutes for Radiance:

The Time · 2nd quarter album cover

Xu released the whole 2nd quarter on October 20, 2017; same day of his 23rd birthday for free online. It consists of 3 songs, namely: "Glory", "Between Us" and "It's Always You".

The official music video of "It's Always You" was released on October 31 at Miaopai and other Chinese streaming sites.

3rd Quarter — 15 Minutes for Monologue:

The Time · 3rd quarter album cover

On December 12, 2017, the third quarter was released. It consists of one song and an audio of Xu talking. The track titles were "Cat" and "Confession". "Cat" was dedicated for Xu's fans and was written and produced by himself while the other one was Xu's "Confession" to "Baizhou" (his official fanclub). Xu also participated in designing the album cover. Before of its official release, Xu performed "Cat" on his Light 2017 concert in Shanghai on December 9.

4th Quarter — 15 Minutes for Fantasy:

The Time · 4th quarter album cover

The last quarter was officially released on January 31, 2018. It consists of 3 songs, namely: "Orange Sky", "Maze" and "Rio". "Maze" was first released as a Chinese promotional song for the American film Maze Runner: The Death Cure on January 24 with some clips of the upcoming movie. The album cover was taken by an internationally renowned photographer Leslie Kee.

On February 8, the official music video of "Orange Sky" was released. It was released at several Chinese streaming sites as well as Sony Music Taiwan's YouTube channel.

== Live performances ==
Xu first performed "So What" live followed by "Leave Me Alone" during the iQiyi Screaming Night Concert on August 19, 2017 and 2017 Fresh Asia Music Awards on August 27, respectively. On November 25, Xu performed "Glory" for the first time on television and won the weekly CCTV Global Chinese Music Chart.

On December 9, 2017, Xu held a concert in Shanghai entitled Light 2017. He performed all his songs from the first two quarters of "The Time" and a new song from the next quarter entitled "Cat" as well as some songs on his previous album Light. All tickets were sold out within 30 seconds.

== Critical reception ==
The 1st quarter has garnered positive reviews from music critics and music bloggers and 13 well-known music personnels and companies as well as 2 fans where invited to ask Xu regarding his album on Sina Weibo.

Deng Ke, a famous music critic said that normally, an idol singer won't write or sing something hardcore but he said that he particularly like "Fading into the Night" out of the three which is quite popular. He also added that "a singer should follow through his heart.." and "..the audience will naturally recognize it".

Zhao Nanfang, also a music critic and an author from Toutiao praised that naming the 1st quarter "15 minutes for craziness" can be effective, has a very strong attraction and fully fit Xu's own singer physique because rock music is Xu's personal preference and it's an important way to identify singers. He also praised the 2nd quarter upon its release and compared it to the previous quarter.

Upon releasing the 2nd quarter, netizens praised the improvement of Xu's English pronunciation to his second pure English song "It's Always You".

== Track listing ==
15 Minutes for Craziness
No.	Title	Lyrics	Music	Producer	Length
1.	"So What"	Zhang Chang	Xu Weizhou	Lee Shih Shiong	3:55
2.	"Leave Me Alone"	Yang Jie	Tang Hanxiao	Lee Shih Shiong	4:05
3.	"Edge of Darkness"	Life Awaits	Life Awaits	Life Awaits	4:08
Total length:					12:08

15 Minutes for Radiance
No.	Title	Lyrics	Music	Producer	Length
1.	"Glory"	Li Nianhe	Braddon Williams; Wang Zi	Zheng Nan	3:23
2.	"Between Us"	Xu Weizhou; Zhou He	Lin Genghe	Jin Dazhou	4:37
3.	"It's Always You"	Lee McCutcheon; Jeremy Thurber	Lee McCutcheon; Jeremy Thurber	Lee McCutcheon	3:18
Total length:					11:18

15 Minutes for Monologue
No.	Title	Lyrics	Music	Producer	Length
1.	"Confession (monologue)"			Xu Weizhou	1:35
2.	"Cat"	Xu Weizhou	Xu Weizhou	Xu Weizhou	4:02
Total length:					5:37

15 Minutes for Fantasy
No.	Title	Lyrics	Music	Producer	Length
1.	"Orange Sky"	Vincent Fang	Xu Weizhou	Zheng Nan	3:59
2.	"Maze"	Wang Haitao	Harvey Mason Jr.; Mike Daley; Mitch Owens; Dewain Whitmore; Patrick "J. Que" Smith	Adia	3:42
3.	"Rio"	Xu Weizhou; Hu Jintao	Xu Weizhou; Hu Jintao; Yang Yue	Wang Yizhe	4:29
Total length:					12:10

== Chart performance ==
=== Weekly ===
Song	Chart (2017)	Peak Position
Leave Me Alone	Billboard Radio China Chart	2
Leave Me Alone	China V Chart	2
Leave Me Alone	Fresh Asia Music Chart	2
So What	Billboard Radio China Chart	4
So What	China V Chart	3
So What	Fresh Asia Music Chart	4
It's Always You	Billboard Radio China Chart	7
It's Always You	China V Chart	1
Cat	Fresh Asia Music Chart	6
Maze	Billboard China Chart	3
Maze	Billboard Radio China Chart	4
Maze	China V Chart	2
Maze	Fresh Asia Music Chart	4
Orange Sky	Billboard China Chart	3
Orange Sky	China V Chart	1
Orange Sky	Fresh Asia Music Chart	4
