= The Rookies (2019 film) =

- Directed by: Alan Yuen
- Written by: Alan Yuen; Lei Xu; Kong Yun-chung
- Produced by: Shan Tam; Rosanna Ng; Tamás Csutak; Eleonóra Peták; Wei Junzi
- Starring: Wang Talu; Sandrine Pinna; Milla Jovovich; Xu Weizhou; Liu Meitong
- Cinematography: Ng Man-ching
- Edited by: Ron Chan
- Music by: Lee Dong-june
- Production companies: New Classics Media Corporation; New Classics International Media Limited; Huaxia Film Distribution Co., Ltd.; Emperor Motion Pictures; Wanda Pictures; Gravity Pictures
- Release date: July 12, 2019 (China)
- Running time: 113 minutes
- Country: China
- Languages: Mandarin; Hungarian; English
- Budget: 300,000,000 yuan ($47,162,394)
- Box office: $3.28 million

The Rookies (Chinese: 素人特工) is a Chinese action film written and directed by Alan Yuen, starring Wang Talu, Sandrine Pinna, Milla Jovovich, Xu Weizhou and Liu Meitong. Filming took place in Hungary and China. It was released in China on July 12, 2019. The film was a box office failure during its release in China, grossing only around $3 million.

== Synopsis ==
Extreme sport lover Zhao Feng gets involved in illegal international trade by accident. So he follows an international special agent Bruce to Budapest. Together with a crappy police officer Miao Yan, a non-professional scientist Ding Shan and an unemployed doctor LV, they form an amateur unit. In company with the senior agent Bruce, these four rookies start a fight with terrorists that is both thrilling and hilarious.

== Cast ==
The following list and order are based on the billing shown on the first movie poster and IMDb.

- Wang Talu as Zhao Feng
- Sandrine Pinna as Miao Yan
- Milla Jovovich as Senior agent Bruce
- Xu Weizhou as Ding Shan
- Liu Meitong as LV
- Alan Wan as Detective Burky
- Björn Freiberg as Agent on the train
- David Lee McInnis as Iron Fist
- Suet Lam
- Temur Mamisashvili as Scientist
- Bernadett Ostorhazi as Scarlet
- Kyle Paul as Secret agent
- Fredrik Yderström as Agent
- David Torok as Gao Hao's Bodyguard
- Paul Allica as Door Guard
- Barret Coates as Soldier
- Franz Rügamer as Scientist / Soldier
- Andrew Lane Cawthon as Iron Fist's Assistant
- Kathy Chow as Zhao Feng's Mother
- Mekael Turner as Sexy
- Pierre Bourdaud as Order agent
- Troy Sandford as Gao's right hand
- Isaac Fernandez as Agent
- Xiao Zhan as Yuan Jinglin

== Production ==
=== Filming ===
Filming locations are Hungary and China. In Hungary, the shooting spots include Hungarian State Opera House, Liberty Bridge, Gellért Hill, Váci Street and Liberty Square. The Rookies wrapped in China on January 23, 2018.

== Release ==
The Rookies was released in China on July 12, 2019.

On August 8, 2018, official site published two sets of posters.
