= Timmy Xu =

Chinese actor and musician (born 1994)

- 许魏洲
- Born: October 20, 1994 (age 31); Shanghai, China
- Education: National Academy of Chinese Theatre Arts
- Occupations: Actor; singer; songwriter
- Years active: 2015–present
- Spouse: Unknown (m. 2022)
- Musical career
- Genres: C-pop; rock; heavy metal
- Instruments: Vocals; guitar
- Labels: StarPower; StarClusterMusic

Chinese name
- Traditional Chinese: 許魏洲
- Simplified Chinese: 许魏洲
Transcriptions
Standard Mandarin
- Hanyu Pinyin: Xǔ Wèizhōu

Timmy Xu (simplified Chinese: 许魏洲; traditional Chinese: 許魏洲; pinyin: Xǔ Wèizhōu) is a Chinese actor, singer, and songwriter. In 2016, he debuted as the character Bai Luoyin in the Chinese BL web series Addicted. He was the first artist to achieve the top spot on the Billboard China V chart and Mandarin chart within the same week. He was the first solo artist from mainland China to hold a concert in South Korea, and to be officially invited as a guest to the Billboard Music Awards in 2017.

Xu made his comeback to the small screen in 2018 and a year later he was nominated for best actor for his lead role in My Girlfriend. In early 2023, Ping Pong: The Triumph and his role received positive reviews. The character Xu played awarded him Annual Attention Actor and Most Breakout Actor. Moreover, Xu's first foray in performance art was an enormous success. For three consecutive months he performed weekly in a total of 33 plays across nine major mainland Chinese cities in Cao Yu's Thunderstorm and Wan Fang's After Thunderstorm. Xu was praised by Wan Fang for his outstanding performance in interpreting a unique perspective of the character and in her own words "the best Zhou Ping".

== Early life and education ==
Since childhood, Xu has pursued various artistic endeavors including dancing, singing, music composition, and playing instruments (especially the guitar). He learned Latin dance for more than ten years and won the gold award from the Imperial Society of Teachers of Dancing (ISTD). In high school, Xu formed two rock bands with some of his schoolmates: "EggAche" and a death metal rock band "PROME", in which he was the lead guitarist. "PROME" won the Midi High School band competition in Shanghai. Moreover, he and his band organized and arranged a winter vacation music festival in Shanghai that was featured in the local newspaper. Xu graduated from the Affiliated Senior High School of the Shanghai Theatre Academy. He graduated from the National Academy of Chinese Theatre Arts in Beijing in May 2017.

== Career ==
=== 2015–2016: Debut ===
While still in college, in October 2015, Xu starred in a short film called Gaming Madness. He also participated in various photo shoots, leading to him being scouted as one of the main leads for a web series called Addicted, broadcast in January 2016. He was also chosen to compose and sing the opening and closing theme songs of Addicted. The full episodes were later uploaded on YouTube, which made the lead actors popular locally and internationally. Afterwards, Xu began to focus on his music career. On May 1, 2016, he released his first album entitled Light and then undertook an Asian concert tour between June and August 2016.

Xu also participated in various fashion magazine photo shoots. Later, he raised his profile and earned numerous awards as "Best New Artist". He was named as one of the Top 20 Most Popular Celebrities on Weibo by Sina Weibo Data Center, and earned the title of "New Trend Idol of the year" from Star Magazine. Moreover, his growing popularity resulted in him being placed first in several polls. He was invited as a guest to a number of radio shows, such as: Billboard Radio China; TofuPOP Radio – BEC Tero Radio in Thailand; Yang Lan 8 p.m. Show; Hongdou Live Interview; FM 101.7 Music Kaleidoscope; and NetEase Cloud Music (Xu Weizhou Cold Jokes); as well as web shows and live streaming events.

On December 8, he released his single "Fun" which rose to the top of several music charts. The official music video was released on December 15. His growing popularity also led to him being ranked 37th on Data Win's Top 50 Most Internet & Business Celebrity Influencers in China 2016.

=== 2017: Variety show and miscellaneous activities ===
In late January 2017, Xu made his first official variety appearance on Intangible Her, broadcast on Tencent Video. His successful variety show debut led to him placing fifth in the Top 10 Most Popular Variety Stars in the first half of the year. That March, Xu sang the Chinese version of "The Heroes" by Simple Plan (the theme song of Canadian film Snowtime!). With this song, he topped the Billboard China V chart and Mandarin chart in the same week for the second time. He also performed the song live with the rock band on March 4 in Beijing. In addition, the Canadian Embassy and Children's Film Association granted him an ambassadorial role for "China-Canada Cultural Exchange" and "Children's Film Promotion" during the film's press conference.

On April 1, 2017, Xu appeared as a guest on the music show Global Chinese Music Chart (currently airing on CCTV15), performing his song "Fun". He was then selected to sing "Screaming Night", the theme song for the 2017 iQiyi Screaming Night Concert, at which the song's video was first screened.

In May, he was officially appointed as the "Starlight" ambassador and was the first artist from mainland China to be invited to the Billboard Music Awards in Las Vegas. Afterwards, he played the main character for a Vogue film project called Seize the Moment, a short film which debuted during the Cannes Film Festival.

After the success of Light in 2016, Xu released the first quarter of his second solo album, entitled The Time, on August 10, 2017. This sold more than 450,000 copies and was certified double platinum. The second quarter of the album was released online for free on October 20, his 23rd birthday, while the third quarter was released on December 12. He was also chosen to sing the theme song for a British-Chinese action thriller film, S.M.A.R.T. Chase, entitled "Ruins of Time", which was released on August 23. The song was written by Jay Chou, a famous singer. Xu's songs "So What", "Leave Me Alone", and "Ruins of Time" were placed first to third place respectively on the YinYueTai China V Chart of most viewed music videos, in weeks 38 and 39 of 2017.

On September 1, Jingdong published Xu's first photo book, entitled "This is Timmy". Later, CCTV announced that he would be one of the hundred singers selected to sing the "China" song in the celebration the 40th anniversary of China's reforms. He attended the annual Anhui TV Drama Awards on December 16.

At the end of 2017, Xu was placed 10th in Sina Weibo's "2017 Popular Star" list, having the highest number reposts (with 65.99 million). His post in Sanya was ranked 10th most popular post with 6.69 million fan interactions. Moreover, 15 Minutes for Craziness ranked fourth on the Top 10 music topics, with 380 million views. His music video "The Heroes", which was posted on Sina Music, was also placed fourth on the Top 10 popular music chart with 0.6 million likes/reposts/comments.

=== 2018: TV drama ===
In January 2018, 20th Century Fox announced that Xu had been selected to sing the Chinese promotional song "Maze", produced by Harvey Mason Jr., for the American film Maze Runner: The Death Cure. In the same month, he was invited to participate in the Chinese Spring Festival Galas of three China TV stations: Dragon Television, Anhui Television, and Beijing Television. On January 31, he released the final quarter of The Time, "15 Minutes for Fantasy". After The Time was released online in its entirety, he held a press conference in Taiwan for the release of the physical album on February 3.

In April, Xu joined the SuperdrySounds project, performing at the global launch party in London and at the Strawberry Music Festival in Shanghai later that month. He started filming for a new drama series, My Girlfriend, on April 16.

In May, he made his TV variety show debut when he guest-starred in two episodes of Give Me Five on Zhejiang TV. The digital version of The Time was officially released in Thailand on May 16, and instantly went to the top of the iTunes chart. On May 26, he performed in Bangkok as part of his second Asia Tour. On May 28, Tencent announced Xu as the new spokesperson for their short video app, Weishi.

In June, Xu placed third on Starmometer's chart of 100 Asian Heartthrobs of 2018.

In July, he joined Shake It Up, a dance variety show on Shanghai TV, winning second place in the final round of the competition. On July 5, presales of the physical version of The Time started on JD.com; more than 13,000 copies were sold within one hour. On July 10, presales of The Time started in Taiwan, where it immediately reached first place on the sales chart. Later in the month, Entertainment Star Business revealed the 2018 Star Commercial Value List, in which Xu was the first-placed Top Potential Artist. He also appeared in the 2018 Forbes 30 under 30 China artist list.

In October, Xu attended the 5th Silk Road International Film Festival closing ceremony and performed his song "Glory". On October 20 (his 24th birthday), he held a free concert at the Olympic Sports Center Gymnasium in Beijing and also released a new song, "Everything About You", for his fans. He was ranked 70th on the list of Top 100 Most Commercial Value Chinese Stars in 2018.

On November 19, it was announced that Xu had been cast in the sports drama Ping Pong. Later, he was selected to sing the theme song for China's Communist Youth League, and China's 40 years of Reform Celebration. In December, he attendedBeijing Television's 2019 New Year Global Gala.

=== 2019–2021 ===
In April 2019, Xu started filming for new TV series Dear Mayang Street. He was selected in the same month to sing the theme song for China's Youth Integrity Education.

In May, Xu attended the Hunan TV Gala for the 100th anniversary of the May Fourth Movement as a representative of outstanding young actors. In addition, he attended the Beijing Winter Olympics Countdown 1,000 days ceremony as their ambassador. He also acted as MC for the event, performing his song "Glory" on stage.

In June, he was appointed as the Youth Film Project Ambassador of Shanghai International Film Festival.

In September 2020, Xu became Shanghai Karamay Cultural Exchange Ambassador. He also filmed his first costume drama, Weaving a Tale of Love.

In 2021, Xu starred in his first Republic of China drama City of Streamer. He also filmed season two of Weaving a Tale of Love.

=== 2022 ===
Xu started 2022 with the release of the music video of the Beijing Winter Olympics theme song Wave, which he sang with Victoria Song. City of Streamer was released in early January; to mark this, one of the drama's theme songs entitled "Unconfused Love" (sung by Xu) was launched online on January 22.

He spent the first half of 2022 working on two films: filming of Almost Lover completed in early March; then Ping Pong:The Triumph began production.

Xu announced his marriage in early March 2022.

He participated in CCTV3 short program "Beginning from Yan'an" in which he portrayed woodcut artist Gu Yuan. The program showed how Gu's journey in the countryside transformed his woodcutting techniques.

On April 7, 2022, "I Wanna be Your Lover" was released as a single. This was a track from the album Crossfever performed by Xu with Japanese band FIVE NEW OLD. It was the promotional song for the Ninagawa Real Flower Exhibition–Between Fiction and Reality, which took place in Beijing. Another song from the album Sunrise was released on as a single on June 23 and as a music video in October. Xu released two other non album songs released: Sing to You, produced by China Youth Daily, and Sing to Dream, the theme song of a program broadcast on Youku's.

Late in the second half of 2022, Xu attended Weibo Night and won the Breakout Actor award. He also attended the Beijing International Film Festival where he sang the opening welcome song with two other Chinese actors.

=== 2023: Film and play (theater) ===
The movie Ping Pong: The Triumph premiered on February 14, 2023, with a wider release on February 17. Xu played the character Bai Minhe in the film, who was based on Ma Wenge. He won Annual Attention Actor and Most Breakout Actor awards for the role. Xu's next movie, Blasting Squad, was announced at a press conference in October; filming started in November 2023. In December, he unveiled his next film Melting City at the 18th China Changchun Film Festival alongside the director and new co-star.

During 2023, Xu broadened his acting range by joining a three-month theatrical tour. He performed Zhou Ping in the play Thunderstorm and After Thunderstorm in thirty-three shows in nine cities between May and July. Following this experience, he reflected on how playing Zhou Ping had been a precious learning opportunity, and thanked his co-stars, creative directors and producers. On a Beijing TV program, Xu talked more in depth about his experience on stage. For example, during the first show he got stage fright: he could not move and thought his stage career was over, as acting on stage could not allow mistakes. Thankfully, he said, he recovered quickly. His co-stars did not even notice. He was very happy to play Zhou Ping particularly in a renowned national theater such as the National Centre for Performing Arts in the heart of Beijing. Wan Fang supervised and guided the troupe from start to finish. She commended Xu for performing the best Zhou Ping. She said he subverted current and previous versions of Zhou Ping and gave a new understanding to the character.

Four more singles and a music video were released from the third album Crossfever. As the name suggests, Crossfever is a cross-border concept album between music and art. "Spreading" was the first single, and was shown at the album's debut on March 3, 2023. It was also the promotional song for "Giger and Hajime Sorayama: Tomorrow is Near" exhibition at UCCA Lab in Beijing. Five or six singles from Crossfever were exhibited in art centers in Chongqing (January 14 to February 5, 2023), Beijing (October 29 to November 17, 2023), and Shanghai (December 2, 2023, to February 4, 2024).

In February 2023, Xu was invited by his alma mater for the high school's alum Q&A special session. During the summer Xu spent his spare time practicing drifting. This led to him officially joining the Shanghai OPS drift team on September 27, 2023. Xu was a torch bearer in the 31st Summer Universiade torch relay in Chengdu on July 26, 2023.

== Fashion ==
=== 2016 ===
In 2016, Xu was invited as a guest to several fashion ceremonies held in China. Amongst these were: Madame Figaro, the French Excellence Awards; the 4th anniversary of OK! Magazine Awards; Damiani's Dinner Party; the Versace 7 Bags for 7 Cities exhibition; the iFeng Fashion Choice Awards; the PEACEBIRD Woman 2017 S/S Fashion Show; L'Officiel's fashion night; the BVLGARI x Vogue GEM DREAM exhibition; Vogue's 11th anniversary ceremony; the Sina Weibo fan carnival; Bazaar's Men of the Year; the 13th Esquire Man at His Best Award Ceremony; the Trendshealth award ceremony; the ELLE Style Awards ceremony; and the Shanghai Divine Michelangelo exhibition.

In July, China Luxury, Beauty and Fashion Insights published the Top 100 Most Valuable Fashion Influencers based on Key Opinion Leader Index (KOLs); Xu was ranked fourth in Weibo's celebrities category. In addition, Timmy Xu Limited Edition Eyeglasses, launched by INMIX, become a best-selling series with 4,672 pieces sold.

=== 2017 ===
In 2017, Xu was featured in the first front cover of Men's Uno Young, a brand new magazine for China's post-90s generation. The photographs were also published in Men's Uno's Taiwan limited edition. Later in the year, he was invited to Vogue's Condé Nast Century exhibition, the Hong Kong Kenzo grand opening, the Shanghai Longines Global Champions Tour, the Tiffany & Co night party, the Fendi PEEKABOO exhibition, the Vogue film premiere, the London Superdry music party, Valentino's I Love Spike, Mika Ninagawa's exhibition, the 14th Esquire Man at His Best Award Ceremony, Grazia's 60th Anniversary Street Fashion Power exhibition, L'Officiel's fashion night, the Men's Uno Young Anniversary Party, and Bazaar's 150th anniversary exhibition.

Xu was officially invited by Givenchy as a guest to its F/W 2017 Men's Paris Fashion Week in France. Additionally, his digital fashion video became a hot trending topic during that time. It broke a record for social posts and views, being accessed more than 500 million times. On March 8, he was invited by Moncler Gamme Rouge and Louis Vuitton to the F/W 2017 Women's Paris Fashion Week.

In April 2017, Xu was announced as an ambassador for the 14th anniversary of Men's Health and, in June, he was appointed as a power brand ambassador by Italian luxury brand, Fendi. In May, Givenchy decided to use him (as a key opinion leader (KOL) who is especially popular among millennials) to lead their Chinese Mother's Day campaign. He was also reported to be one of the most famous faces in China's activewear market and one of the most influential fashion stars in China's luxury market by New York Digital Marketing Agency. In June, INMIX, an eyewear brand, launched a set of exclusive emoticons with Xu, using rights granted by the Emoji brand. Subsequently, he was invited to the Louis Vuitton S/S 2018 Men's Paris Fashion Week on June 22, the Coach S/S 2018 Women's New York Fashion Week on September 12, and Givenchy S/S 2018 Women's Paris Fashion Week on October 1.

Xu was the first Chinese star to become the face of South Korean cosmetics brand Laneige in China. Bomoda China's KOL Index also reported that, in the first half of 2017, Xu was first in the Top 30 Most Influential Social Celebrities list and fourth place in the Top 10 Potential Celebrities in China's consumer marketplace. On October 23, Xu, together with Dunhill and China's Esquire, released a special short fashion film called "Urban Symphony", shot in Hungary. A yearly report on the jewellery market by L2's Digital IQ Index: Luxury China, mentioned that Tiffany & Co increased engagement on Weibo due to their online promotions featuring Xu.

On November 20, he was invited as a special guest to attend the annual Victoria's Secret Fashion Show in Shanghai and his look was listed in British GQ's 10 best-dressed men in the world that week. In December, Xu was announced to be the first mainland artist to have collaborate with the British international branded clothing Superdry. The limited collection based on that collaboration sold out within 100 seconds at Tmall and in two hours at the Beijing, Shanghai, and Chengdu stores. His appearance on the Men's Uno cover was listed ninth of the Top 10 Best Men Fashion Magazine Covers of The Year by famous fashion blog FashionModels.

=== 2018 ===
On January 4, 2018, China's COACH officially appointed Xu as their first Coach Men spokesman. Later that month, he attended Fendi's F/W 2018 Men's Milan Fashion Week as Fendi's new power brand ambassador. He also attended Alexander McQueen's F/W 2018 Men's Paris Fashion Week as the first officially invited Chinese male artist. In the same month, he was announced as the new style brand ambassador for Tiffany & Co., and as a global spokesperson for British brand Superdry.

He was invited to Laneige's Cushion Dream Factory Night, the Fendi Newsstand event, Shanghai's Superdry Sounds party, Daniel Wellington's My Classic Night Out, the Coach x Disney Dark Fairytale, Vogue's film premiere, the Men's Uno Sport Event, Nylon's 1st anniversary party, Elle's 30th anniversary ceremony, the Laneige x Line Friends event, Shanghai's Tiffany & Co. Paper Flowers Party, and Hong Kong's Roberto Cavalli event. On April 11, he attended Superdry Sounds global party in London as Global Brand Ambassador. On May 3, he appeared at the Tiffany & Co. flagship store at Fifth Avenue, New York City, to attend the Tiffany Paper Flower ceremony as Brand Style Ambassador. On May 19, Xu attended the launch ceremony of Libert'aime by Forevermark as the first Light Icon of the brand. The "Le Light x Xu Weizhou" limited collection sold out quickly in the online presale. On June 24, Xu attended the Dunhill 2019 S/S fashion show in Paris.

Xu featured on the cover of the June/July issue of Elle Men Hong Kong, his third time on the cover of the magazine in three years. He was listed in the "Top 10 rising Asian stars taking over the fashion scene". L2's Digital IQ Index 2018 reported that Laneige was ranked seventh on the Top 10 Beauty Brands in China, including COACH and Valentino (which were ranked fourth and eighth respectively), because of Xu's ability to achieve high engagement on Weibo. He is the first male artist to be featured on the cover of the two newest magazines GQ Sport and NewOne.

In September, China's famous sportswear & footwear brand Belle International announced him as their new ambassador. Xu attended the Balmain S/S 2019 Women's Paris Fashion Week on September 28. At the year's end, the Chinese magazine Bella reported that the issue featuring Xu as cover star was their best-selling in 2018.

=== 2019 ===
In 2019, the Annual China Entertainment Index by AI Man Data revealed that Xu was ranked fifth on the 2018 Top 10 Influential Fashion Male Artists list. On January 27, Xu was ranked fourth and ninth (for COACH and Tiffany & Co respectively) on the Top 20 list of 2018's Most Valuable Celebrity Brand Endorsers. In April, I-MAGAZINE published the 2018 Best Fashion Face Award – Xu was ranked 50th.

On June 18, Fendi officially announced Xu as their first Peekaboo Spokesperson in China. He also walked the runway at the Fendi F/W 2019–2020 Women's and Men's Collection Show in Shanghai and the Fendi S/S 2020 Men's Milan Fashion Week as their new spokesperson.

=== 2020 – 2022 ===
Xu attended Fendi's spring and summer 2020 fashion show on January 10, 2020, as a Fendi Peekaboo spokesperson. He appeared on the cover of February's Vietnamese issue of Harper's Bazaar. In April, Xu appeared on the cover of POSH Magazine-Myanmar with Wutt Hmone Shweyi. Xu was invited to attend the opening event for Alexander McQueen's new boutique flagship store in Shanghai on September 22, 2020. On December 10, 2020, Xu gave a speech at the Esquire Man at His Best Award fashion event. He won the Anticipated Actor of the Year award.

Xu was featured on the covers of the January 2022 issues of Men's Uno, Lifestyle, and Wonderland magazines. In November 2022, Xu attended the RIMOWA Craftsmanship Realm Limited Time Exhibition in Shanghai.

=== 2023 ===
Lifestyle magazine featured Xu as their February 2023 cover star. He graced Champion and Men's Uno magazines in April. In May, Xu appeared on the cover of the Chinese edition of Collectible DRY magazine. He was also featured on the cover of the June issue of Ray Li magazine.

On July 29, 2023, Xu attended Kenzo's first fashion show presenting the 2024 spring and summer collection in Shanghai, China. He was invited to attend the finale of Men's Uno Male Model Contest competition in Shanghai on August 29, 2023. On September 16, 2023, Xu went to Ermenegildo Zegna's OASI CASHMERE exclusive collaboration series (Zegna X The Elder Statesman) in Chengdu Taikoo Li's pop-up store. A week later, on September 28, Xu attended the first Shanghai New Vision of Design 2023 event (organized by WWD International Fashion News). Xu then attended Tumi's limited-time pop-up store in Shanghai on October 11, 2023.

== Philanthropy ==
=== 2016 ===
In 2016, Xu was appointed as a national ambassador to a number of charities including: "Against Domestic Violence"; "Rio Run"; "Animal Welfare Charities" by Cabbeen; "Lucky Cat Welfare Organizations"; "Hope For Home For Children" by the China Charities Aid Foundation For Children; "Moon bear protecting" by the Animals Asia Foundation (AAF); "1,000 rabbits look up at the moon" by the China Social Welfare Foundation; "Adopt pets instead of purchasing" by the Beijing Non-profit Adoption organizations; "Charity Stars: Love can touch" by Harper's Bazaar; and "Door of charity" by the China Children and Teenagers' Fund (CCTF).

In the same year, he founded "Light of love for the blind", and "10.20 km run to the light for the blind". In addition, he joined the Kering Foundation's campaign of anti-violence against women.

=== 2017 ===
In 2017, Xu continued his charitable efforts by giving his support to more events and organizations, including: "Wuxi Marathon" (as Men's Health spokesman); "amfAR"; "World Book Day – Read to Lead" (run by the Xinhua News Agency); "Love the Earth" (part of the New Media Exhibition of Global Sustainable Development); "Youth Attitudes – One Hundred Thousand Young People" (run by NetEase), the China Ministry of Civil Affairs and UNICEF's "Child Welfare & Protection Week"; the Alibaba Foundation's "Release An Aquatic Animal to Protect Natural Resources" campaign; the "Caring for People with A Spinal Cord Injury" campaign headed by WeiboFit, China Foundation for Disabled Person and Xinhua News Agency; "Make A Promise – Lockit Series" (promoted by Louis Vuitton and UNICEF); and NetEase's "Cat & Dog Daily – Adopt pets".

Moreover, he has been the ambassador for the Campus Public Welfare Foundation's campaign, "Adopt A Green Plant for Green Earth"; the Beijing Foundation for the Disabled's, "Caring for Disabled Children" campaign; "Caring for Blind Children" (Sina Micro-Philanthropy); Baidu's "Boiling Point Public Welfare"; and the "I want to go to school" campaign by Music Radio – China National Radio (CNR) and the China Children and Teenagers' Fund (CCTF).

In July, the China Charities Aid Foundation for Children announced Xu's appointment as a charity ambassador for the "Hope For Home For Children" project for the next two years. On October 20, Shanghai Fire Department appointed him as their official firefighter ambassador to promote their external activities and services.

In November, he was appointed as the Ice and Snow ambassador for SINA's sport classroom. In addition, Sina Weibo revealed that Xu's charity activities was one of the 10 most influential charitable topics of 2017.

=== 2018 ===
In 2018, Xu joined Netease's charity program as ambassador for a book donation project benefiting children in rural areas. In August, he was officially appointed as the National Winter Sports promotion ambassador for the 2022 Winter Olympics in Beijing.

In September, Xu became TRENDSHEALTH's Pink ribbon ambassador to raise awareness of breast cancer. In October, The European Travel Commission (ETC), co-funded by European Union, appointed him as their EU-China Tourism Year ambassador to promote tourism in the EU.

=== 2019 ===
In 2019, Xu was ranked third on the New Generation Artists Charity Influence list compiled by AI Big Data Artists Charity Influence. On March 18 of that year, he was appointed as China's science fiction ambassador for National Science Popularization. On March 30, he attended the Lights-Out of Earth Hour – Connect to Earth Charity Program to promote environmental protection. In May, he was selected to be the ambassador of "Sunshine of Love": a project for disabled people in China.

In addition to his own charity works, his fans also donated to various projects on his behalf. Examples include: collaboration with the Chengmei Charitable Foundation and the Energy China Platform to provide donations to the Energy Model Group's public welfare projects for the construction of two gyms and ten library corners in rural areas; donations of musical instruments to Baimu Central Primary School in Baimu Village, Shijing Town, Louxing District, Loudi City, Hunan Province, so that students could have their first music classroom; and donations of sports equipments to enrich students' extracurricular activities in school life in Luobo Township, Qingshen County, Sichuan Province.

=== 2020 ===
On March 3, 2020, Xu released the song, Cherish, as a tribute to frontline staff fighting against COVID-19. With the assistance of the China Foundation for Poverty Alleviation, Xu and his studio donated 1,617 pieces of protective clothing worth CN¥ 215,061 primarily to support the medical supplies of Zhongxiang People's Hospital in Hubei Province in fighting the new coronavirus epidemic. He also donated an ambulance to the Health Bureau of Yunxi County, Hubei Province for the same purpose on April 2, 2020. On April 4, the song Fearless (with Angelababy, Zheng Kai & Tang Yan) was released in tribute to those in the frontline of the battle against COVID-19 in Shanghai. During China's Children's Welfare and Protection Publicity Week, on June 6, 2020, Xu was named one of several Ambassadors for Welfare and Protection of Children in Rural Areas.

=== 2021 ===
On May 6, 2021, Xu was named Ecological Protection Image Ambassador. He donated CN¥ 500,000 on July 21, 2021, to support flood relief efforts in Henan Province. Together with UCCA, he organized a virtual public charity event on September 6, 2021, donating educational art supply bags to rural schools. During International Deaf Day (September 29, 2021), Xu and Baidu APP worked together to raise awareness of good hearing health and learning how to create a healthy "sound environment" for ears. A charity sale was set up, in conjunction with Hearing Foundation, from which all proceeds were donated to hard of hearing individuals.

He attended the UCCA Foundation's charity dinner, to promote the development of art education in China, at the Bulgari Hotel in Shanghai on November 6, 2021. On December 1, 2021, Xu worked with The China Foundation for Poverty Alleviation, Sina News, and Weibo Campus China Rural Development Foundation to create a virtual Q&A mailbox focusing on left-behind children in rural areas, to support them growing with love and knowledge. On May 6, 2021, Xu was named Ecological Protection Image Ambassador.

=== 2022 ===
On September 7, 2022, Xu Weizhou provided a donation to support the provision of daily nutritional meals to Moon Bears at the Chengdu Bear Rescue Center. Together with gymnast Zou Jingyuan, Xu thanked all blood donors on June 14, 2022 (World Blood Donor Day). Between October 12, 2022, and October 20, 2022 (around his 28th birthday), it was announced that all proceeds from the sale of an online magazine called Xu Weizhou: Growing Towards the Sun would be donated to the Rural Revitalization Music Classroom Project.

=== 2023 ===
Proceeds (including sales and a donation by Xu) from his 2022 charity birthday magazine《许魏洲：向阳而生》were donated in 2023 to purchase musical instruments in support of rural children's pursuit of art and music. The same year, he repeated the charity birthday magazine drive between October 12 and October 20, promising that all sales of the magazine would be donated to the same project. Another project that combined his charity with his fans' was the continued sponsorship daily nutritional meals to Moon Bears at the Chengdu Bear Rescue Center. On June 2, 2023, acting as UCCA Foundation Art Charity Ambassador, Xu spent a day as an assistant art teacher to special students at the Chengdu Jinjiang District Special Education School.

== Filmography ==
=== Documentary ===
Year	Title	Chinese title	Role	Network	Notes	Ref.
2017	Shadow of Light	光之影	Himself	YouTube	2016 First Light Asia Tour Concert Documentary	
2018	Documentary of the Xu Weizhou Birthday Concert	许魏洲生日演唱会纪录片	Himself	iQiyi	2018 Final Light Beijing Birthday Concert Documentary	

=== Producer ===
Year	Title	Chinese title	Notes	Ref.
2022	A Passing Cloud	流云过	Shortlisted for best short film at ReelFocus真实影像计划, directed by Tang Peiyan	
2024	Here Comes the Sun	遥远的下午	Shortlisted at San Sebastian International Film Festival and Pingyao International Film Festival, directed by Wu Lang	

=== Play ===
Year	Title	Chinese title	Role	Notes	Ref.
2023	Thunderstorm	雷雨	Zhou Ping	Produced by 央华戏剧 (Yanghua Drama)	
2023	After Thunderstrom	雷雨后	Zhou Ping	Produced by 央华戏剧 (Yanghua Drama)	

=== Films ===
Year	Title	Chinese title	Role	Notes	Ref.
2015	Gaming Madness	电竞也疯狂	Yue Hongsheng	Short film	
2016	Big Fish & Begonia	大鱼海棠	Kun	Voice-dubbed	
2019	The Rookies	素人特工	Ding Shan	Support role	
2021	Let's Write Love Story	我们书写爱情吧	Xu Dezhi	Also screenwriter	
2023	Ping Pong: The Triumph	中国乒乓之绝地反击	Bai Minhe	Support role	
2024	Here Comes the Sun	遥远的下午	TBA	Short film, Actor, Producer	
2024	Here Comes the Sun	遥远的下午	TBA	Short film, Actor, Producer	
2026	Crossing	四渡	Bo Gu		
TBA	Dying Eye	濒死之眼	TBA	Lead role	

=== Television series ===
Year	English title	Chinese title	Role	Network	Notes	Ref.
2016	Addicted	上瘾	Bai Luoyin	iQIYI, YouTube	Lead role	
2018	The Evolution of Our Love	爱情进化论	Ding Yuyang	Zhejiang TV, Shanghai TV	Support role	
2019	My Girlfriend	我不能恋爱的女朋友	Chi Xin	Youku	Lead role	
2020	Midsummer Is Full of Hearts	仲夏满天心	Jin Zeyi	Tencent Video	Lead role	
2020	Dear Mayang Street	亲爱的麻洋街	Ou Xiaojian	Youku	Lead role	
2021	Weaving a Tale of Love	风起霓裳	Pei Xingjian	Hunan TV, Youku	Lead role	
2021	Ping Pong	荣耀乒乓	Yu Kenan	iQIYI	Lead role	
2022	City of Streamer	流光之城	Rong Jiashang	Tencent Video	Lead role	
2022	Almost Lover	谁都知道我爱你	Xiao Shangqi	Tencent Video	Lead role	
2023	Weaving a Tale of Love 2	风起西州	Pei Xingjian	Youku	Lead role	
TBA	Where I Stand is China	我站的地方是中国	Yuan Changning	TBA	Lead role	

=== Variety shows ===
Year	English title	Chinese title	Role	Network	Notes	Ref.
2017	Intangible Her	触不到的TA	Guest	Tencent Video	Episode 8	
2017	Global Chinese Music Chart	全球中文音乐榜上榜	Guest	CCTV-15		
2018	Give Me Five	高能少年团	Guest	Zhejiang TV	Season 2, episode 2 & 3	
2018	Shake It Up	新舞林大会	Regular member	Shanghai TV		
2018	Happy Camp	快乐大本营	Guest	Hunan TV	Ep. 1053, 1063, 1074	
2019	Everlasting Classics	经典咏流传	Guest	CCTV-1	Season 2, episode 9	
2019	Day Day Up	天天向上	Guest	Hunan TV		
2019	Happy Camp	快乐大本营	Guest	Hunan TV		
2019	Meet at Temple of Heaven	遇见天坛	Guest	Beijing TV	Episode 7	
2019	Young Forever	我们的歌	Regular member	Shanghai TV		
2020	We Are on the Way	我们在行动	Guest	Shanghai TV	Season 4, episode 7 & 8	
2020	Happy Camp	快乐大本营	Guest	Hunan TV		
2020	Singer 2020	歌手	Guest	Hunan TV	Season 8, episode 12	
2020	Life is Beautiful	让生活好看	Regular member	Tencent Video	Season 1	
2020	Back to Field	向往的生活	Guest	Hunan TV	Season 4, episode 5 & 6	
2020	Hi! Relax	亲爱的请放松	Guest	Mango TV	Episode 5	
2020	Everlasting Classics	经典咏流传	Guest	CCTV-1	Season 3, episode 7	
2020	Crossover Singer	跨界歌王	Guest	Beijing TV	Season 5, episode 7	
2021	Marvelous City	奇妙之城	Guest	Youku	Episode 5	
2021	Everlasting Classics	经典咏流传	Guest	CCTV-1	Season 4, episode 7	
2021	So Young So Flowering	28岁的你	Guest	Hunan TV	Episode 4	
2021	Don't Underestimate Me	不要小看我	Guest	Zhejiang TV	Episode 3 & 4	
2021	Play! Fridge	拜托了冰箱	Guest	Tencent Video	Season 7, episode 7	
2021	The Romance	恋恋剧中人	Regular member	iQIYI		
2021	Happy Camp	快乐大本营	Guest	Hunan TV		
2022	We Are The Champions	战至巅峰	Regular member	Tencent Video		
2022	Home Among Landscape	山水间的家	Guest	CCTV	Episode 3	
2022	Memories Beyond Horizon	无限超越班	Regular member	Youku/Zhejiang TV		
2023	Hello, Saturday 2023	你好，星期六	Guest	Hunan TV/Mango TV	Episode 11 & 36	
2023	Sweet Tasks Season 5	甜蜜的任务 2023	Guest	Mango TV	Episode 10	
2023	HaHaHaHaHa Season 3	哈哈哈哈哈 第三季	Guest	Tencent Video	Episode 5	
2023	Friends Together	是好朋友的周末	Guest	Youku	Episode 1 & 2	
2023	The Fairy Tales	童话	Regular member	Tencent Video/Youku		
2023	Live in Every Kind of Life	住进每一种生活	Guest	Tencent Video	Episode 5	

== Discography ==
- Light (2016)
- The Time (2018)
- CrossFever (2024)

== Concerts and tours ==
Year	Date	Location	Venue	Notes	Ref.
2016	February 20	Shanghai	Yun Feng Theater	Addicted Fan meeting	
2016	April 17	Bangkok	BBC Hall Central Plaza Ladprao	Addicted Fan meeting	
2016	June 5	Beijing	Wukesong Huiyuan Space	Light Asia Tour Concert	
2016	June 25	Seoul	Seoul KBS Arena	Light Asia Tour Concert	
2016	July 17	Shenzhen	Futian Sports Stadium	Light Asia Tour Concert	
2016	July 30	Bangkok	Thunder Dome, Muangthong Thani	Light Asia Tour Concert	
2016	August 13	Shanghai	Shanghai Grand Stage (Shanghai Gymnasium)	Light Asia Tour Concert	
2017	December 9	Shanghai	Shanghai Jing'an Sports Center Gymnasium	Light Asia Tour Concert	
2018	May 26	Bangkok	Thunder Dome, Muangthong Thani	Light Asia Tour Concert	
2018	October 20	Beijing	Olympic Sports Center Gymnasium	Light Asia Tour Concert	
2019	October 20	Beijing	Beijing Workers Gymnasium	White Time Zone Concert	

== Awards and nominations ==
Year	Award	Category	Nominee/work	Result	Ref.
2016	16th Top Chinese Music Awards	Most Popular Network Drama Idol	Addicted	Won	
2016	4th OK! Magazine Awards	New Generation Actor	—N/a	Won	
2016	Fresh Asia Music Awards	Best New Artist	—N/a	Won	
2016	iFeng Fashion Choice Awards	Fashion Popularity Pioneer	—N/a	Won	
2016	L'Officiel Fashion Night Awards	Best New Artist	—N/a	Won	
2016	1st Annual Sina Weibo Fan Festival Ceremony	Sina Star of The Year	—N/a	Won	
2016	Bazaar's Men of the Year Ceremony	Attractive Star of the Year	—N/a	Won	
2016	13th Esquire Man at His Best Award	Best New Artist	—N/a	Won	
2016	Trendshealth Award Ceremony	Influential Health Role Model	—N/a	Won	
2017	Annual Sina Sports Awards	2016 Sports Male God	—N/a	Won	
2017	The 24th ERC Chinese Top Ten Awards	Most Influential Network Artist	—N/a	Won	
2017	The 24th ERC Chinese Top Ten Awards	Best New Artist	—N/a	Won	
2017	CCTV Global Chinese Music Chart	Weekly Champion	Fun	Won	
2017	5th V Chart Awards	Best New Mainland Artist	—N/a	Won	
2017	Music Radio China Top Ranking Awards	Best New Artist	—N/a	Won	
2017	Asian Music Gala Awards	Best New Artist	—N/a	Won	
2017	MTV Global Chinese Music Awards	Most Popular New Male Artist	—N/a	Won	
2017	MTV Global Chinese Music Awards	Top Ten Golden Songs	Walk Slowly	Won	
2017	Fresh Asia Music Awards	Most Popular Singer	—N/a	Won	
2017	Fresh Asia Music Awards	Top Ten Golden Songs	Fun	Won	
2017	14th Esquire Man at His Best Award	Favorite Idol	—N/a	Won	
2017	CCTV Global Chinese Music Chart	Weekly Champion	Glory	Won	
2017	L'Officiel Fashion Night Awards	Fearless Spirit Representative Actor	—N/a	Won	
2017	Men's Uno Young Award Ceremony	New Youth Actor	—N/a	Won	
2018	The 25th ERC Chinese Top Ten Awards	Most Influential Network Artist	—N/a	Won	
2018	The 25th ERC Chinese Top Ten Awards	Media Recommended Singer	—N/a	Won	
2018	Music Radio China Top Ranking Awards	Most Popular Male Singer	—N/a	Won	
2018	Global Chinese Music Awards	Annual Best Live Performance Male Singer	—N/a	Won	
2018	Global Chinese Music Awards	Annual All-Round Male Artist	—N/a	Won	
2018	Asia Music Festival Ceremony	Most Popular Male Singer	—N/a	Won	
2019	China Quality TV Drama Awards	All-Around Artist of the Year	—N/a	Won	
2019	The 26th ERC Chinese Top Ten Awards	All-Around Artist of the Year	—N/a	Won	
2019	The 26th ERC Chinese Top Ten Awards	Media Recommended Concert	—N/a	Won	
2019	MTV Europe Music Awards	Best Greater China Act	—N/a	Nominated	
2019	Tribute to Heritage & Craftsmanship Gala	Preservation Ambassador of Fashion Craftsmanship	—N/a	Won	
2019	Golden Bud – The Fourth Network Film And Television Festival	Best Actor	My Girlfriend	Nominated	
2019	Cosmo Glam Night	Person of The Year (Love)	—N/a	Won	
2019	Sina Fashion Awards	Brand Influence Artist of the Year	—N/a	Won	
2019	16th Esquire Man at His Best Awards	Fashion Artist of the Year	—N/a	Won	
2019	Tencent Video All Star Awards	Trendy Figure of the Year	—N/a	Won	
2020	17th Esquire Man at His Best Awards	Most Anticipated Actor of the Year	—N/a	Won	
2022	Weibo Movie Night	Potential Actor of the Year	—N/a	Won	
2022	Weibo TV & Internet Video Summit 2022	Breakout Actor of the Year	—N/a	Won	
2023	China Movie Channel M List	Annual Attention Actor	Ping Pong: The Triumph	Won	
2023	The 4th New Era International Film Festival Golden Flowering Awards	Most Breakout Actor	Ping Pong: The Triumph	Won	
2024	Tencent Music Entertainment Awards (TMEA 5th)	All Around Breakout Artist of the Year	—N/a	Won	
