= Light (Xu Weizhou album) =

Studio album by Xu Weizhou
- Released: 1 May 2016
- Recorded: 2016
- Genres: C-pop; Rap; Rock Music; Ballad
- Length: 26:32
- Languages: English; Chinese
- Label: 极韵文化 (Pole Rhyme Culture)

Xu Weizhou chronology
Light (2016)	The Time (2017)

Singles from Light
- 1. "Walk Slowly" Released: 1 March 2016; 2. "Dust" Released: 9 March 2016; 3. "Moonlight" Released: 21 March 2016; 4. "I Remember Your Eyes" Released: 28 March 2016; 5. "Understand Dream" Released: 10 May 2016

Light (Chinese: 光) is the debut album by Chinese singer-songwriter Xu Weizhou. The album was released on 1 May 2016. It consists of 7 songs. Most of the songs were composed by Xu Weizhou himself and also contributed in writing lyrics. After the album release, he conducted his "First Light Asia Tour" around various Asian countries.

== Background ==
Light consists of various genres such as ballad and pop-rock with a mix of rap. Most of the songs were composed by Xu himself and also contributed to lyrical writing. Xu revealed that the two songs "Understand Dream" and "I Remember Your Eyes" were first composed by him when he was 17 years old and "Dust" was given to him by a friend. The two soundtracks, "Walk Slowly" and "Because of the Sea" of a web series Addicted he starred on was also included in his album.

== Promotion and release ==
Xu pre-released some songs in his album at Sina Weibo. The first one was "Walk Slowly" on 1 March, followed by "Dust" on 9 March, "Moonlight" on 21 March, "I Remember Your Eyes" on 28 March and "Understand Dream on 10 May but the whole album was officially released on 1 May 2016. He performed "Walk Slowly" and "Because of the Sea" live for the first time on Addicted fan meeting held in Beijing, "Dust" on 16th Top Chinese Music Awards and "Light" on 2nd Addicted fan meeting held in Bangkok. Later, he performed "Light" again on 2016 Fresh Asia Music Awards and 24th Oriental Billboard Award Ceremony.

In February 2017, iFASHION published a short clip music video of "Light" for Xu's photoshoot. Later in March, he released the documentary of his "First Light Asia Tour" entitled "Shadow of Light" which included behind the scenes of his concert tours.

== Commercial performance ==
The album has sold over 10,000 copies within 15 minutes; 2,920 and 7,089 copies on standard and deluxe edition, respectively. The deluxe edition contains a photo book, poster and a shirt designed by Xu himself. It was also revealed that the tickets on his first concert to Beijing were sold out within 3 minutes while the VIP tickets to Bangkok were sold out within 35 seconds. Xu conducted his "First Light Asia Tour" around June to August at Seoul, Bangkok and 3 other cities in China and participated in music festivals afterwards.

Xu was the first solo artist from Mainland China to hold a concert in South Korea and also won several awards of "Best New Artist" after his concert tours. In 2017, "Walk Slowly" won an award of "Top Ten Golden Songs" during MTV Global Chinese Music Awards night.

== Live concerts ==
=== First Light Asia Tour ===
Date	Location	Venue
5 June 2016	Beijing	Wukesong Huiyuan Space
25 June 2016	Seoul	KBS Arena
17 July 2016	Shenzhen	Futian Sports Stadium
30 July 2016	Bangkok	Thunder Dome, Muangthong Thani
13 August 2016	Shanghai	Shanghai Grand Stage (Shanghai Gymnasium)

=== Music Festivals ===
Date	Music Festival	Location
15 September 2016	Forest Music Festival	Nanjing
24 September 2016	Zebra Music Festival	Shanghai
23 October 2016	20th PEACEBIRD Music Festival	Ningbo

On 9 December 2017, Xu held another concert in Shanghai entitled Light 2017. He performed "Understand the Dream", "I Remember Your Eyes", "Dust", "Because of the Sea", "Walk Slowly" and all his songs from the first two quarters as well as a new song from the third quarter of his second album The Time. All tickets were sold out within 30 seconds.

== Track listing ==
No.	Title	Lyrics	Music	Length
1.	"Walk Slowly"	Long LeePark	Xu Weizhou	4:41
2.	"Dust"	Su Tonglok	Su Tonglok	4:18
3.	"Moonlight"	Xu Weizhou	Xu Weizhou	4:06
4.	"I Remember Your Eyes"	Xu Weizhou	Xu Weizhou	3:01
5.	"Because of the Sea" (featuring Huang Jingyu)	Chai Jidan	Xu Weizhou	3:22
6.	"Understand the Dream" (featuring Zhu Yuanbing)	Zhu Yuanbing; Xu Weizhou	Xu Weizhou	4:00
7.	"Light"	Xu Weizhou	Xu Weizhou; Pan Cheng	3:04
Total length:				26:32

== Chart performance ==
The song "Light" was included in "Top 20 Hit Songs For First Half Of 2016" according to Global Chinese Golden Chart and "Top 20 Most Favorite Songs of 2016" according to Music Radio China Chart. In addition, "Walk Slowly" ranked 1st on the yinyue 39th issue while “Dust” and “MoonLight” both ranked 3rd on the 40th and 42nd issue, respectively.

=== Weekly ===
Song	Chart (2016)	Position
Light	Pop Songs Chart	1
