= Addicted (web series) =

2016 Chinese television series

- Promotional poster
- Also known as: Heroin
- Simplified Chinese: 上瘾
- Hanyu Pinyin: Shàngyǐn
- Genre: BL
- Based on: Are You Addicted? by Chai Jidan
- Written by: Chai Jidan
- Screenplay by: Cu Wu
- Directed by: Ding Wei
- Starring: Timmy Xu; Huang Jingyu; Fengsong Lin; Chen Wen
- Theme music composer: Chai Jidan; Timmy Xu
- Opening theme: "If Hai Has Yin"
- Ending theme: "Walk Slowly"
- Composers: Mr. Long; Timmy Xu
- Country of origin: China
- Original language: Mandarin
- No. of seasons: 1
- No. of episodes: 15

Production
- Production locations: Beijing, China
- Running time: 21-25 minutes per episode
- Production company: Beijing Fengmang Culture Communication Co.

Original release
- Network: iQiyi; Huace Film & TV (Youtube)
- Release: January 29 – February 23, 2016

Addicted (Chinese: 上瘾; pinyin: Shàngyǐn), also known as Heroin, is a 2016 Chinese streaming television series based on the boys' love novel Are You Addicted? (你丫上瘾了) by Chai Jidan. The series is about two sixteen-year-old boys, Bai Luoyin (Timmy Xu) and Gu Hai (Huang Jingyu), who fall in love despite their different backgrounds. The series premiered on January 29, 2016 and aired for three episodes weekly until February 23, 2016, when it was banned by Chinese authorities before its finale. The series developed a cult following in Asia, propelled its two leading actors to fame, and marked the official ban of LGBTQ content in mainland China’s film and television industry.

== Production ==
Filming of the drama began on November 30, 2015, in Beijing, China and ended on December 23, 2015. Featuring a first-time director and new actors, the drama had a production budget of only 5 million yuan (around US$741,300). Due to the low-budget, the cast did their own make-up most of the time and supplied some of their own clothes for the filming.

Prior to Addicted, Boys' Love dramas were understood to belong in a very specific genre with a very specific audience base, hence the series wasn't expected to reach mainstream success.

== Synopsis ==
Ever since he was young, Bai Luoyin (Timmy Xu) has been living with his careless but loving father, Bai Hanqi, and his sick grandmother. When he turned 16 years old, his biological mother Jiang Yuan remarried. Her new husband is a high-ranking military official, Gu Weiting.

Because of his mother's death, Gu Weiting's son, Gu Hai (Huang Jingyu), has been harboring a deep grudge towards his father. By the random hand of fate, the two step-brothers with wildly conflicting emotional backgrounds were placed in the same class at a Beijing high school, without knowing each other's background at first. With time, they slowly developed a special feeling toward one another. Their classmates, You Qi and Yang Meng, had been instrumental in the relationship.

At times, over the course of the series some friends mention that an abbreviated combination of the boys names Hai and Luoyin sound like "Heroin".

== Cast ==
Actor	Role	Description
Timmy Xu	Bai Luoyin	Main character, Son of Jiang Yuan, Gu Hai's love interest
Huang Jingyu (Johnny Huang)	Gu Hai	Main character, Son of Gu Weiting, Bai Luo Yin's love interest
Fengsong Lin	You Qi	Classmate
Chen Wen	Yang Meng	Classmate, Bai Luoyin's childhood friend
Song Tao	Bai Hanqi	Bai Luoyin's father
Wang Dong	Gu Weiting	Gu Hai's father
Liu Xiaoye	Jiang Yuan	Bai Luoyin's mother, Gu Hai's step-mother
Wang Yu	Gu Yang	Gu Hai's cousin
Lou Qing	Jin Lulu	Gu Hai's former girlfriend
Zhou Yutong	Shi Hui	Bai Luoyin's former girlfriend

== Episodes ==
Episode No.	Original air date
1	January 29, 2016
Bai Han Qi, Bai Luo Yin's father, accidentally throws Luo Yin's underwear to the drain. Luo Yin then informs his friend Yang Meng that his mother (Jiang Yuan) is getting married. Meanwhile, Gu Hai is conflicted on deciding to whether or not attend his dad's remarriage ceremony and approaches his girlfriend, Jin Lu Lu, for advice. He later has dinner with his dad, Gu Wei Ting, and his future new stepmother Jiang Yuan, but the dinner soon turns sour as the father and son quarrel. Luo Yin ignores his mother when she advises him on his future education, and she is later scolded by Luo Yin, leaving his mother in tears. Gu Hai moves out from his home and seeks his older sister on relocation. Both Gu Hai and Luo Yin report to class but notice that their teacher resembles Jiang Yuan (mother for Luo Yin and stepmother for Gu Hai). Gu Hai was punished by the language teacher for submitting a blank homework assignment, and so, Gu Hai tore Luo Yin's homework out of his workbook as revenge for his unique handwriting which Gu Hai doesn't like. Gu Hai met up with his friends Li Shuo and Zhou Yi Hu.
2	January 31, 2016
You Qi receives a gift from his admirer, but mistook that the gift was from Luo Yin, whom he secretly has feelings for. Han Qi accidentally washes one of the remaining 2 pairs of Luo Yin's underwear, but when he receives a box of new briefs and a box of medication, he suspects someone from his class is shadowing him. When Gu Hai tells Luo Yin that he was the one who gave the gifts and that he was the one who tore out Yin's homework (apologizing for that as well), Luo Yin stomps out in anger. Later, Gu Hai changes his seat to be behind Luo Yin, and he starts to plan revenge by cutting some holes out of the school jacket that Luo Yin wears. During the class physical lesson, Gu Hai impresses both his classmates and his teacher by producing 106 push ups in a minute.
3	February 3, 2016
Gu Hai beats his physical teacher's by doing more than a hundred pull-ups. Luo Yin plans his revenge against Gu Hai by sewing his school jacket shut, resulting being sent out by his math teacher for creating a ruckus. But during their English language lesson, a sleeping Luo Yin accidentally chided his teacher, thinking that it was Gu Hai who disturbed him. With several revenges acting amongst Gu Hai and Luo Yin, Luo Yin plots a new scheme by buying mechanical oil and locking the classroom doors. Unbeknownst to Luo Yin, this act would ultimately make him look bad as Gu Hai calls the school's principal in the class while telling him on a sticky note that it was Luo Yin who ruined the doors. The next day, Luo Yin receives breakfast after arriving to class and thinks that it was an act from You Qi.
4	February 5, 2016
After class, Yang Meng asks Luo Yin about why he does not get along with Gu Hai when Gu hai is so nice to him. Yang Meng mentions that Gu Hai put in so much effort in getting Yin breakfast and that he is always looking at Yin whenever Meng turns around. Luo Yin scoffs, saying that it must be Hai thinking of new ideas to trouble him. In homeroom, Gu Hai tries to embarrass Luo Yin by volunteering him to sing a song in English and calling out attention to a sleeping Yin; despite all these attempts, Luo Yin manages to sail through beautifully. The next day, Luo Yin comes down with a cold. At school, Gu Hai gets two sleeping pills from the school's doctor and puts them to Luo Yin's water bottle. Unfortunately, the cold medicine Luo Yin took in the morning had already expired and that combined with the sleeping pills knocked him out unconscious in class. Gu Hai carries him to the nurse's office, gets him an IV drip, and stays behind to watch him. When Luo Yin wakes up and sees Gu Hai after ending up in a hospital bed, he asks Gu Hai why he is so bent on torturing him. Gu Hai responds that he is "ill" and that Luo Yin will have to endure some suffering for him to "get better." Back at school the next day, test results are distributed and Luo Yin has one of the highest scores in the class. However, some jealous prat from another class (Wu Fang) barges in the room and starts insulting Luo Yin's mom, calling her a prostitute. Enraged, Gu hai knocks down Wu Fang and starts beating him up. The principal and teacher arrive to stop the fight and take Gu Hai away. Luo Yin waits for Gu Hai to return to class, worried that he had been expelled. Gu Hai comes back, assuring Luo Yin that he will be back tomorrow. Before leaving, Luo Yin notices blood stains on Gu Hai's jersey and exchanges the stained jersey with his own.
5	February 7, 2016
Luo Yin is haunted by Wu Fang's insults and goes to eat and drink his feelings for dinner that night. Gu Hai meets Luo Yin at his dining table and joins him. The two of them talk about their mothers and how Luo Yin hasn't been getting enough sleep since he broke up with his ex-girlfriend. After dinner, Luo Yin gets too drunk to go home himself and Gu Hai carries him on his back to drop him off. As Gu Hai leaves the Yin's residence, Han Qi comments on how two parents could raise such a good son like Gu Hai. When Gu Hai returns to his home, he find his father waiting there for him on his couch. Wei Ting orders his son to return home and that he and his stepbrother will be attending Gu Hai's old school the next day. Gu Hai refuses to comply, saying how he will not be in anyplace with his new family. Wei Ting is infuriated, goes to beat on Gu Hai (only to be stopped by the family driver), and threatens to cut off Gu Hai's expenses. In the morning Gu Hai runs into Luo Yin on his bike. They have breakfast together at Luo Yin's aunt's shack and arrive at school together. You Qi asks Luo Yin why he came to school with Gu Hai instead of Yang Meng, to which Luo Yin replies with that it was just a coincidence that they ran into each other. After school, Gu Hai gets invited to hang out with his friends on the following Saturday, but the next morning, Luo Yin invites Gu Hai to go fishing with him on the same Saturday. Gu Hai ends up fishing with Luo Yin on Saturday, blowing off and ignoring his friends, and together, they catch a fish.
6	February 10, 2016
Together, Luo Yin and Gu Hai have caught many fish. Gu Hai invites himself to a meal at Yin's home but Luo Yin insists that he'll prep the fish at his place and then, bring it over to Gu Hai. After Gu Hai is successful in asking for a shower, and to Luo Yin's dismay and annoyance at his father disregarding him, Han Qi allows for Gu Hai to stay for dinner. After the meal Han Qi orders for Luo Yin to take his friend home but halfway there, Gu Hai says that he can take himself home and bikes away. Luo Yin secretly shadows behind him, and feeling that he's being followed, Gu Hai breaks into a neighboring home of a poor person, and once inside, he tosses his bike and backpack over the gate to his actual home. In the morning, Gu Hai notices that Luo Yin is waiting for him outside and he jumps over the gate again with his stuff in the same yard he broke into last night. Meanwhile, the friends that Gu Hai ignored on Saturday are out looking for him. Two of them saw Gu Hai biking on the road with Luo Yin but one of them thought it was only a look-alike and they both dismiss the initial assumption and keep looking for Gu Hai. At the school, Gu Hai's girlfriend, Jin Lu Lu, is there, demanding to see Gu Hai. She wants him to come back home but he responds with that he likes it here and that she is being too rowdy and suspicious of everything. This is proven to be correct when a few minutes later, Lu Lu is wailing on a female student that was flirting with Gu Hai earlier. Embarrassed by the incident, Gu Hai takes his girlfriend out on the P.E. field and makes a proposition with her: Lu Lu can stay in town for however long she wants as long as she 1. doesn't mention Gu Hai's economic status and where he's actually from, and that she 2. doesn't seem "too rich" when she meets his new friends. After school, Gu Hai invites Luo Yin to meet Lu Lu and the three of them have lunch together. Lu Lu is jealous of the attention Luo Yin is getting from Gu Hai but she gradually grows to like Luo Yin as he always deflects that attention back to her. Once they finish eating, Lu Lu asks Luo Yin to watch over Gu Hai and to call her if anything happens. When she does come back, she'll treat Luo Yin to another meal. The next day, at Luo Yin's aunt's shack, Gu Hai tells Luo Yin of his relationship with Lu Lu and they end their conversation at breakfast by talking about what type of girls they like.
7	February 12, 2016
Gu Hai's father talks to Bai Luo Yin to convince him to live with him and Luo Yin's mother, but without success. Gu Hai takes Bai Luo Yin to shops near the zoo to help him bargain in buying clothes for him. After having dinner and small amount of liquor at Bai Luo Yin's home, Gu Hai acts like he is drunk and refuses to leave Bai Luo Yin's bed. Later, Gu Hai asks Bai Luo Yin why the teacher was looking for him. Bai Luo Yin tells Gu Hai about his mother and the meeting that day with his stepfather. Gu Hai also learns Bai Luo Yin likes to eat salted-egg lotus-bean flavoured moon cakes on August 15. The next day, Bai Luo Yin's mother meets Gu Hai at a restaurant to convince him to make him live with her and her husband; however her attempt fails. Later that night, Gu Hai buys salted-egg lotus-bean flavoured moon cakes, which both Gu Hai and Bai Luo Yin eat and go to bed. In bed, Bai Luo Yin tells Gu Hai that he knows Gu Hai is living in a rented house and that he is rich.
8	February 14, 2016
While in bed, Gu Hai tries to make Bai Luo Yin to turn to his side, but Bai Luo Yin refuses. In the morning, Bai Luo Yin waked up in the arms of Gu Hai. While playing basketball, Bai Luo Yin injures his leg and face by a fellow student, whom gets kicked by Gu Hai for injuring Bai Luo Yin. Bai Luo Yin gets help from his friends You Qi and Yang Meng. On the way home, Gu Hai forces Bai Luo Yin to ride with him on his bicycle. At Bai Luo Yin's house, Bai Luo Yin tells Gu Hai that he was ignored by Gu Hai. Gu Hai disagrees and gives him the medicines he bought for Luo Yin. Later, Gu Hai helps Bai Luo Yin with his wounds. In the Bed, Gu Hai tries to convince Bai Luo Yin to masturbate with him, but Bai Luo Yin refuses. The next day morning, they learn that aunt Chou's shack was destroyed by somebody. Gu Hai asks his uncle to help to get a place to start a restaurant for aunt. During this visit, Gu Hai also picks up the dog from his uncle. Bai Luo Yin learns from his father aunt Chou got a government approval to start a restaurant without a renting fee. Later that night, Bai Luo Yin confronts Gu Hai and thanks him for helping aunt Chou. Bai Luo Yin asks Gu Hai to live in their house. Bai Luo Yin and Gu Hai visits Gu Hai's friends. Gu Hai's friends were surprised to see that Gu Hai sips from Bai Luo Yin's drink. Bai Luo Yin asks Gu Hai's friends whether they have masturbated with Gu Hai before, to which they say no because Gu Hai does not like people touching him. Later that night, while in the bed, Gu Hai again tries to masturbate with Bai Luo Yin and Bai Luo Yin refuses.
9	February 17, 2016
At night, in the bed, Bai Luo Yin puts hemorrhoid cream on Gu Hai lips for the sore lips. While Gu Hai prepares to vacate his room, Bai Luo Yin learns that Gu Hai uses his torn-up essay from his notebook for penmanship. While fighting to get back the essay notes from Gu Hai, Gu Hai's girlfriend Jin Lu Lu walks in. Gu Hai tells his girlfriend that his phone was broken and could not call her. Jin Lu Lu notices that Gu Hai's phone (that was fixed by Bai Luo Yin before Lu Lu's arrival) was working and breaks the phone. Gu Hai gets angry and tries to hit her, but blocked by Bai Luo Yin. With anger, Jin Lu Lu leaves the place. Bai Luo Yin asks Gu Hai to go and convince Jin Lu Lu, to which Gu Hai obliges. Later, the three of them eat at a restaurant. While eating, Jin Lu Lu asks her boyfriend to hit Bai Luo Yin as a friendly gesture. Gu Hai gets mad and warns that he won't allow anybody to hit Bai Luo Yin. Jin Lu Lu gets angry at Gu Hai's reaction and leaves. Bai Luo Yin's father buys a new phone for Gu Hai picked by Bai Luo Yin. Gu Hai helps Bai Luo Yin's father in cementing a leakage at their home. At night in the bed, Gu Hai asks Bai Luo Yin why his father is not joining aunt Chou's business, to which Bai Luo Yin replies that his father is too proud to join aunt Chou and that aunt Chou is not widow, but her husband never visits her. Later, Bai Luo Yin's father was fired from his job and offered a better job. Bai Luo Yin learns about his father's job and realizes that Gu Hai is behind this. Thus, Bai Luo Yin confronts Gu Hai.
10	February 19, 2016
Gu Hai reveals that, as a gratitude for the Bai family, he decided to help Han Qi getting a better job. Luo Yin, hurt in his pride, reproaches him that the affairs of his family do not concern him. During dinner, Han Qi says he bought a new bed for Gu Hai. Gu Hai, visibly upset, makes excuses for him to return the bed to no avail. At night, with both beds separated, Gu Hai complains about sleeping alone. Later, believing Luo Yin to be asleep, Gu Hai approaches his bed but gets pricked by a cactus that Luo Yin has placed to avoid his approach. The next morning Luo Yin wakes up with Gu Hai's hand on his crotch, and realizes that during the night he has assembled the two beds together. In class, You Qi tells Luo Yin with a note that he has seen Lu Lu accompanied by another man. Due to the temperament and his relationship with Gu Hai, he asks Luo Yin to be the one to tell him. Gu Hai immediately seeks to verify the information, manages to find Lu Lu and his companion, and follows them to a hotel. Despite her pleas, Gu Hai decides to break the relationship. He then receives a call from Luo Yin who asks him if he will return home. In their room he reveals what happened and Luo Yin shows him affection and consolation for the situation. The next day Gu Hai and Luo Yin help with the opening of aunt Chou's new restaurant. Luo Yin's mother appears and ends up arguing with Luo Yin. Gu Hai goes to look for Luo Yin, and they discover their family connection. Luo Yin, puzzled by the revelation, hastily leaves the restaurant with the suspicion that Gu Hai already knew but had not revealed it for his own intention. At Luo Yin's house, they have a heated argument in which Luo Yin asks Gu Hai to leave home. Gu Hai rejects him revealing that he is in love with him and that he does not intend to leave him. Luo Yin admits that he cannot hate Gu Hai or his family but that it is very difficult for him to accept what his family has done to his. Gu Hai complains about Luo Yin who, out of pride, prefers to expel him from his life. Gu Hai decides to temporarily leave the Bai family's house.
11	February 21, 2016
You Qi, uneasy about Luo Yin's absence for two days, asks Gu Hai about it but not getting an answer. He decides to go with Yang Meng to Luo Yin's house. Awakened, You Qi asks Luo Yin if he has had a fight with Gu Hai and if he thinks something's strange with their relationship. The next morning Luo Yin goes to class while Gu Hai, observing the scene from a taxi, decides to absent himself. A classmate gives Luo Yin Gu Hai's notebooks, asking about his whereabouts. Looking at the notebook, Luo Yin notices that Gu Hai has done a calligraphy job by repeatedly writing his name while he has been absent, which saddened Luo Yin. Gu Hai seeks comfort from his friends who try to cheer him up at a party by ranting against his former girlfriend. He confesses while being drunk that he misses Luo Yin. Luo Yin is informed that there is a possibility Gu Hai will transfer school. He immediately visits Gu Hai with the excuse of handing him his notebooks. They talk about their situation and Gu Hai confesses that he has only cried for one person, Luo Yin, something he did not do even after the death of his mother. At home, Luo Yin has a conversation with Han Qi who learns about his dispute with Gu Hai and reproaches him for his attitude. He demands that he apologize to Gu Hai and convince him to return home. The next day, on the way to school, Luo Yin is intercepted by two kidnappers. Handcuffed in a room, Luo Yin discovers that Gu Hai had orchestrated this action. Gu Hai, placing himself on top of Luo Yin, warns Luo Yin that he will not be able to get rid of him easily, then kisses him despite Luo Yin's opposition. Gu Hai reveals that he loves him, he desires him obsessively, and even if he thinks of him as a pervert, he will take it as long as he can be by his side. Luo Yin reveals that he was going to apologize to him at school and ask him to return to his house. Gu Hai, who did not expect such a reaction, thinks that it is a ruse to escape, but after speaking on the phone with Han Qi, he discovers that Luo Yin has told him the truth. Gu Hai frees him from the handcuffs and Luo Yin strikes him furiously. Gu Hai confesses to Luo Yin that everything he has said has come from the bottom of his heart and asks if he loves him even just for a little. Luo Yin, dismayed, answers no. Gu Hai says that he is willing to give him time, shower him with love until he admit the true nature of his feelings towards him. The next day, they share a meal with Gu Hai's father and Luo Yin's mother. Both once again reject the offer to live in Gu Hai's family home, but they begin to live together in the apartment owned by Gu Hai.
12	February 24, 2016
At Luo Yin's house, Gu Hai presents gifts for Luo Yin's family. At school, Luo Yin learns that in an upcoming medical examination, which includes genital observation, they will have to undress. Worries that Gu Hai will see him naked, Luo Yin asks the vice-monitor not to put them in the same group. However during the medical exam, he ends up being examined at the same time as Gu Hai. Gu Hai and You Qi take the opportunity to gaze over Luo Yin's body. Upon leaving the exam the vice-monitor tells Luo Yin that the preliminary tests reveal he has hepatitis, which alarms Luo Yin. At Gu Hai's apartment, Luo Yin tells Gu Hai the news but he does not take it seriously, to Luo Yin's anger. Gu Hai reacts by hugging him and comforting him with a promise to take him to the hospital. After dinner, Luo Yin takes a shower and, only covered with a towel, asks Gu Hai for pajamas. Gu Hai, seeing him practically naked, becomes aroused. Gu Hai affectionately reproaches him that, by undressing in front of him, he has voluntarily seduced him. They ends up doing sexual activity together after which Gu Hai tells Luo Yin that he has been charming and very hot. Hugging Luo Yin, Gu Hai promises to shower him with love and affection. The next morning, in class, the vice-monitor tells Luo Yin in the presence of Gu Hai that it turns out Luo Yin does not have hepatitis but actually the antibodies to the disease. The vice-monitor ends up receiving a punch from Gu Hai who blames him for having ruined the plan to become more physically intimate with Luo Yin. You Qi offers Luo Yin to come to his family home for the weekend. Gu Hai, jealous, asks Luo Yin to accompany him to buy furniture instead. Luo Yin, much to Gu Hai's satisfaction, rejects You Qi's offer. Annoyed, You Qi vents his anger on Yang Meng. At night at Luo Yin's house, Gu Hai and Luo Yin study for the exam. To encourage Gu Hai, Luo Yin tells him that if he does not master the subject, he will end up sleeping in his father's room. The next day, on the way to school, Gu Hai admits that his savings have dramatically dwindled by not wanting to accept money from his father. Luo Yin comes up with an idea for a quick buck.
13	February 26, 2016
Luo Yin, Gu Hai, and their friends gambles on a game of Mahjong where Luo Yin keeps on winning. During the subsequent meal, it is revealed that he has an eidetic memory, which helps him to know the pieces that both he and the others have. They win, to Gu Hai's satisfaction, 12,000 yuan from the game. The next day, in the schoolyard, Yang Meng calls Luo Yin for help, explaining that for no apparent reason, You Qi is harassing him, which You Qi later denies. Upon leaving class, Luo Yin accompanies Yang Meng home to the annoyance of Gu Hai. At Luo Yin's house, Gu Hai, angry at Luo Yin, decides not to go in and stay at the door. Han Qi, despite Luo Yin's protests, defends Gu Hai once again and forces Luo Yin to stay out with Gu Hai until he apologizes to him. At night, in the house, Gu Hai states that it is very difficult for him to control his feelings in front of Luo Yin's friends and that it would help him if Luo Yin confesses his true feelings for him. Luo Yin is not prepared to confess his emotions, and he reveals that, even if he does not express it, Gu Hai already knows what feelings he feels for him. With a big smile, they sleep hugging each other. The next morning, Yang Meng goes to the Luo Yin's house. Luo Yin, alarmed, because he does not want Yang Meng to know that he sleeps together with Gu Hai, wakes up in a hurry to avoid having to explain. Yang Meng notices the situation. Luo Yin finally tells him that they have been living together for two months because Gu Hai has had family problems. In the afternoon Gu Hai and Luo Yin walk along the river and observe Han Qi chatting animatedly with aunt Chou. Gu Hai confesses that he would love for both of them to get married because then both of them can live together in Gu Hai's apartment. In the house, Luo Yin talks to Han Qi in which Luo Yin proposes that he marries aunt Chou. Several days later, Han Qi and aunt Chou hold a wedding feast attended by family and friends. Happy for the event, Luo Yin toasts and smiles for the newly married couple.
14	February 28, 2016
After the banquet, Luo Yin is drunk after drinking too much alcohol. Although Han Qi insists that they stay at the house, Gu Hai indicates that they are not going to ruin their wedding night and, carrying Luo Yin on his back, they go to his apartment. On the way, Luo Yin whispers to Gu Hai that he wants to go to the roof of the building. Once there, Luo Yin cries inconsolably, before an emotional Gu Hai, for the loss of family life and the relationship that until then he has had with his father. Gu Hai tells him that his father will always love him, but no one will love him as much as he does. The next morning, Gu Hai wakes up hugged by Luo Yin but he must go to pick up his cousin Gu Yang who is in town on business. The three of them meet in a restaurant, but because of Gu Yang cold, demanding personality, he treats Luo Yin indifferently. At night, Gu Yang appears at Gu Hai's apartment criticizing the decoration and style of the house. Gu Hai, pretending that he and Luo Yin are going to bed soon, manages to get him to leave. Luo Yin then playfully locks himself in the bedroom but Gu Hai tricks him out of the room, carries him on his shoulders and throws him on the bed. The next day Gu Hai and Gu Yang have tea. When asked by Gu Hai when he will be leaving town, Gu Yang notices that Gu Hai rushes to lose sight of him, something that is new, and states that the cause may be that he now has a person to take care of. Gu Yang implies that, in the past, there was some kind of relationship between the two of them beyond family or friendship. The next day Gu Hai and Luo Yin stop at a store after school to buy rice snacks. Due to a confusion in the name of the flavor, Gu Hai ends up mistakenly ordering "penis meat" instead of "chicken meat". The shop assistant and Luo Yin, laughing, warn him of his mistake. Embarrassed, Gu Hai replies to Luo Yin that in the night, the "meat" Luo Yin will eat will be "his". Upon returning home, they find the apartment door open by Luo Yin's mother who came to do some cleaning and check if they are all right. Both, annoyed by the intrusion, go about the daily things they usually do and discover that she has been able to enter the apartment because she has a set of keys. Once she leaves, they decide that the lock needs to be changed to avoid repeating the scene.
15	February 29, 2016
On Christmas Eve, Luo Yin wakes up alone in bed. Surprised by the absence of Gu Hai, he waits for him outside despite the intense cold. When he arrives, he indicates that he has gone out to buy breakfast but had to run home due to traffic. In class, Gu Hai reveals that a female student has given him a scarf. He affirms that this girl has a romantic interest in him to arouse Luo Yin's jealousy. He then decides to return the gift, to Luo Yin's relief. After class, they exchange gifts but coincidentally they both have bought each other gloves, to their laughter. At Christmas Luo Yin and Gu Hai invite Gu Hai's friends to eat at the apartment. After indicating that Luo Yin is a few days older than Gu Hai, they make jokes about the way that Luo Yin exercises a domination over Gu Hai which his friends have never believed possible for anyone. After dinner they are both asleep on the sofa. Luo Yin awakes to receive a phone call from his ex-girlfriend who wants to see him. He refuses. Right after finishing the conversation, Luo Yin carries Gu Hai in his arms, asleep, and takes him to the bed where they passionately kiss and have their first penetrative sex. The next morning at Luo Yin's house, Gu Hai answers another call from Luo Yin's ex-girlfriend, says that he is Luo Yin's boyfriend, and hangs up. Luo Yin then calls her again and asks her to forget about him because he has a boyfriend and his life is now different. They return to the apartment and Luo Yin receives an expensive box of imported luxury gifts from Gu Hai. Luo Yin says that Gu Hai didn't need to buy him those gifts because there is no chance that he will go back to his ex-girlfriend. Going down to Gu Hai's garage, Gu Hai, to Luo Yin's alarm, shows him a new car that he has bought with his mother's inheritance. After entering it, they passionately kiss and Gu Hai reveals that he will do anything and satisfy everything that Luo Yin asks of him but if Luo Yin crosses him, he will not show compassion. The next day when they are in class, Luo Yin's ex-girlfriend Shi Hui suddenly makes an appearance.

== Soundtrack ==
No.	Song title	Artist(s)	Composer	Notes
1	"If Hai Be With Yin" (海若有因)	Timmy Xu & Huang Jingyu	Timmy Xu	Opening theme song
2	"Walk Slowly" (慢慢走)	Timmy Xu	Timmy Xu	Ending theme song
3	"I Think" (我想)	Shuhei Nagasawa	Xiao Long Lao Si	
4	"I Only Love You" (我只在乎你)	Teresa Teng	Takashi Miki	
5	"Trouble I'm In"	Twinbed	Nate Campany, Benjamin Romans	

== Reception ==
=== Audience viewership ===
On January 29, 2016, the series' first episode premiered on Tencent Video, iQIYI, and other video sites and garnered 10 million views in the span of 24 hours after its initial online release, setting the record of the highest number of views on the first day in China's streaming television history. In less than a month, the series reached over 100 million views, and it became the second most-watched show on iQiyi and the most-watched show on other video sites.

=== Social media ===
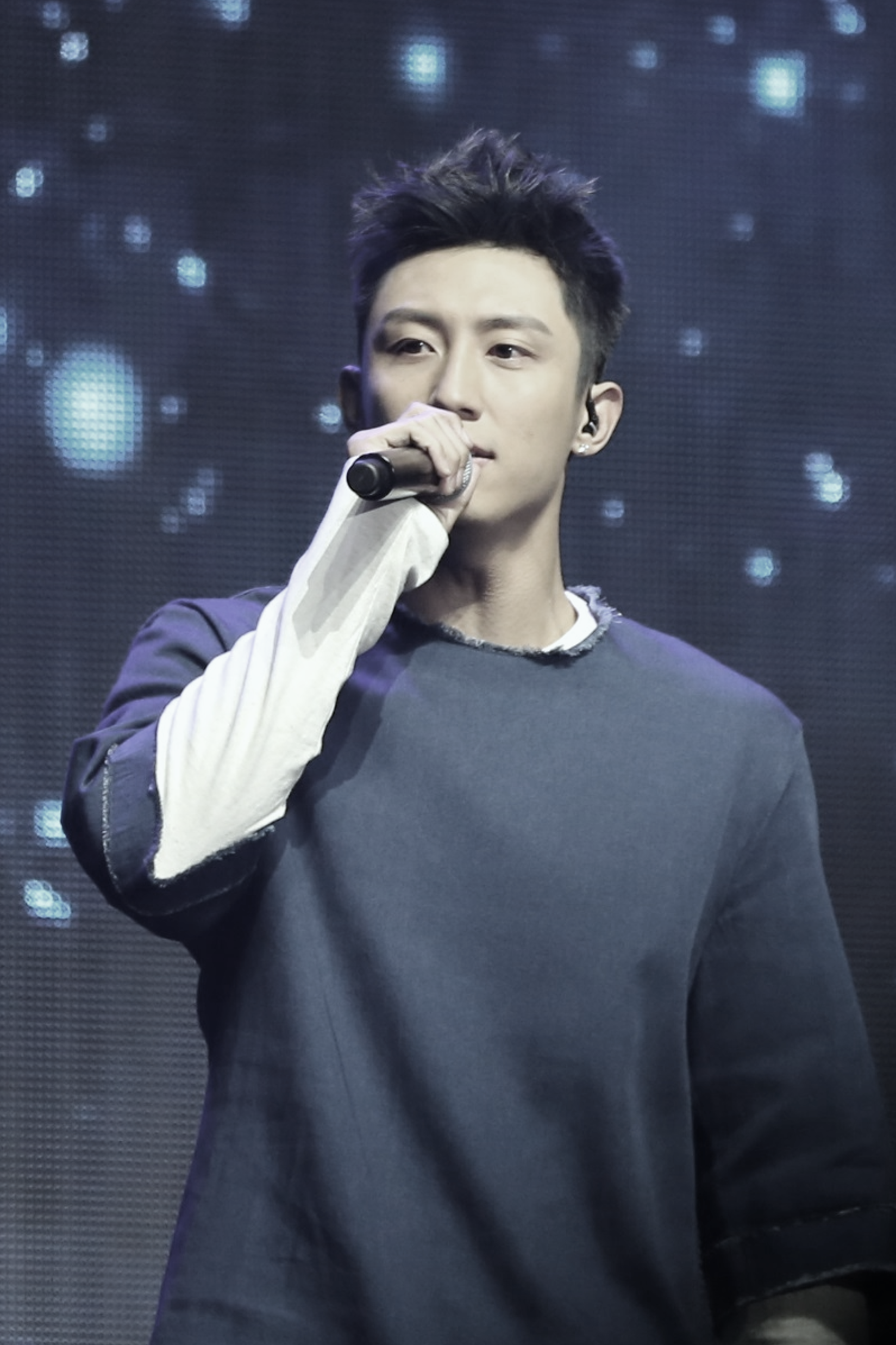
Huang Jingyu (image) and Timmy Xu achieved overnight stardom from the success of Addicted.

The series became a viral topic on Weibo and other social platforms. The word 上瘾 (Shàngyǐn) was mentioned more than 3.9 million times on Weibo in the week of February 21 – 27, 2016, and the hashtag #上阴网络剧# (Shàngyǐn web drama) was viewed over 840 million times.

A Weibo user wrote about how the series was a phenomenal success:

"You have no idea how crazy it was. [...] The whole of weibo was talking about it. Everyone was watching it; everyone was talking about it."

The four main actors, particularly Huang and Xu, achieved overnight stardom. Their on-screen chemistry and off-screen interactions in backstage clips gained them a large number of fans who "shipped" them as a real life romantic couple.

== Censorship ==
Despite the success, on February 23, 2016, all episodes of the drama were abruptly removed from all Chinese video streaming websites (three episodes before the season finale) by the order of SAPPRFT (now NRTA) due to "the gay and explicit content" and are no longer accessible to Chinese viewers, much to the series viewers' outrage. The last three episodes of the first season were uploaded a few days later to the official YouTube channel of Huace Film & TV, accessible to viewers outside of mainland China.

=== Reactions ===
It is an issue that is being widely discussed. The government does not want the LGBTQ community to become popular.

— Xin Ying, executive director of Beijing LGBT Center, about Addicted censorship.

The censorship of the series sparked criticisms, questions, and discussions about the taboo topic of homosexuality and the acceptance of LGBT community in authoritarian mainland China. Online discussions on Weibo with the hashtag "removal of Addiction" received more than 110 million views within a day of its cancellation. American news media The Wall Street Journal and Time also published articles about the censorship.

Matthew Baren of Shanghai Pride told Time that while it is "disappointing" that Addiction was taken offline, "it’s very encouraging to see shows about homosexuality being made in China, by Chinese talents and for Chinese audiences." A Weibo user was quoted by the South China Morning Post: "Why did they take away this drama? [...] There are millions of reasons to cover their move, but the truth is that they are afraid of gay [issues]." Chinese activist Li Maizi argued regarding the series' censorship: "The recent hit gay-themed Web dramas show that the LGBTQ market is broad. [...] SAPPRFT had better face up to it rather than implementing unspoken rules or using traditional values as a shield."

=== Banning of Xu and Huang ===
Despite the series' cancellation, the two main actors continued to skyrocket in popularity both individually and as a screen couple, doing interviews and magazine photoshoots together, and also continued publicly interacting and "teasing" each other on Weibo to fans' delight.

However on April 17, 2016, it was revealed that the planned second season of Addicted was permanently shelved, and China has unofficially banned the two actors from appearing on television or any event together. Their filmed appearances on Chinese television variety shows such as Happy Camp, Run for Time, and Avenue of Stars subsequently never aired. On April 17, 2016, during a fan meeting in Thailand, in a brief moment when they did come together, they were quickly pulled apart by security guards. It was their last public appearance together. There was no official announcement to the banning of the actors (contrary to the previous official announcement ordering the series to immediately be pulled off-air) to the puzzlement and disappointment of fans. Xu stopped receiving work offers for a period of time as a repercussion of the ban.

It was later revealed that SAPPRFT had released a directive that ordered all channels to cease inviting Addicted's lead actors onto their shows or to "hype" them, alongside the order to ban the series.

== Legacy ==
As of April 2024, the series' episodes on Huace Film & TV YouTube channel has a total of 34 million views. The series remains the most popular Boys' Love series ever made from mainland China.

The series has developed an active cult following in boys' love genre fandom and casual fans since its cancellation, both locally and internationally. As of October 2020, the Weibo forum for fans of the series (especially fans of Huang and Xu as a couple) known as 双超 (shuangchao) has over 360,000 followers, most of them still being active.

The term "eight-year promise" is used by the series' fans to wait for the day Huang and Xu are "able to share the stage together, to be photographed together, once more." The fans chose eight years because the couple is separated for eight years in the original novel.

== Remakes ==
- On June 21, 2019, Ji Dan posted pictures on Weibo and responded to user's questions by saying that filming for "Addicted 2" has started in Taiwan. It was rumored that the cast has been changed.
- On July 7, 2023, a Taiwanese remake of Addicted titled Stay With Me, directed by Su You Chen and written by Ji Dan, was released. It aired on GagaOOLala and Viki International until August 12, 2023.
- On August 13, 2024, a Thai remake titled Addicted Heroin premiered on WeTV, starring August Vachiravit Paisarnkulwong and Mac Nattapat Nimjirawat.

== See also ==
- List of BL dramas
