= 22nd Beijing College Student Film Festival =

2015 film festival in Beijing, China

The 22nd Beijing College Student Film Festival was held from 11 April to 9 May 2015 in Beijing, China.

== Winners and nominees ==
Best Film: Dearest – Peter Chan; Wolf Totem – Jean-Jacques Annaud; 12 Citizens – Xu Ang; Coming Home – Zhang Yimou; Blind Massage – Lou Ye	Best Director: Jean-Jacques Annaud – Wolf Totem; Lou Ye – Blind Massage; Xu Anhua – The Golden Era; Jiang Wen – Gone with the Bullets; Zhang Yimou – Coming Home
Best Actor: Qin Hao – Blind Massage; Huang Xuan – Blind Massage; Huang Bo – Dearest; Feng Shaofeng – The Golden Era	Best Actress: Zhao Wei – Dearest; Tao Hong – Forgetting to Know You; Yang Zishan – 20 Once Again; Tang Wei – The Golden Era; Hao Lei – The Golden Era
Best Newcomer: Zhang Huiwen – Coming Home; Kris Wu – Somewhere Only We Know; Lu Han – 20 Once Again; Chen Yinuo – When a Peking Family Meets Aupair; Ye Qing – Brotherhood of Blades	Best Directorial Debut: Wolf Warriors – Jason Wu; Two Thumbs Up – Ho Leung Lau; The Continent – Han Han; Forgetting to Know You – Quan Ling; ATA – Karma Chakme Rinpoche
Jury Award: Xu Ang – 12 Citizens; Jean-Jacques Annaud – Wolf Totem; Peter Chan – Dearest; Zhang Yimou – Coming Home; Lou Ye – Blind Massage	Committee Special Award: Tsui Hark – The Taking of Tiger Mountain
Students' Choice Award for Favorite Actor: Lu Han – 20 Once Again	Students' Choice Award for Favorite Actress: Wang Likun – Somewhere Only We Know
Students' Choice Award for Favorite Director: Zhang Yibai – Fleet of Time	Best Screenplay: Chen Zhengdao and Ren Peng – The Great Hypnotist; Ho Leung Lau – Two Thumbs Up; Ismene Ting – I Love You, Too.; Quan Ling – Forgetting to Know You; Zhang Ji – Dearest
Artistic Exploration Award: Seven Days; Gone with the Bullets; The Golden Era (film); Blind Massage	Best Visual Effects: Wolf Totem; The Taking of Tiger Mountain; Gone with the Bullets; Wolf Warriors; Brotherhood of Blades
