= Huang Jingyu =

Chinese actor and model

- 黄景瑜
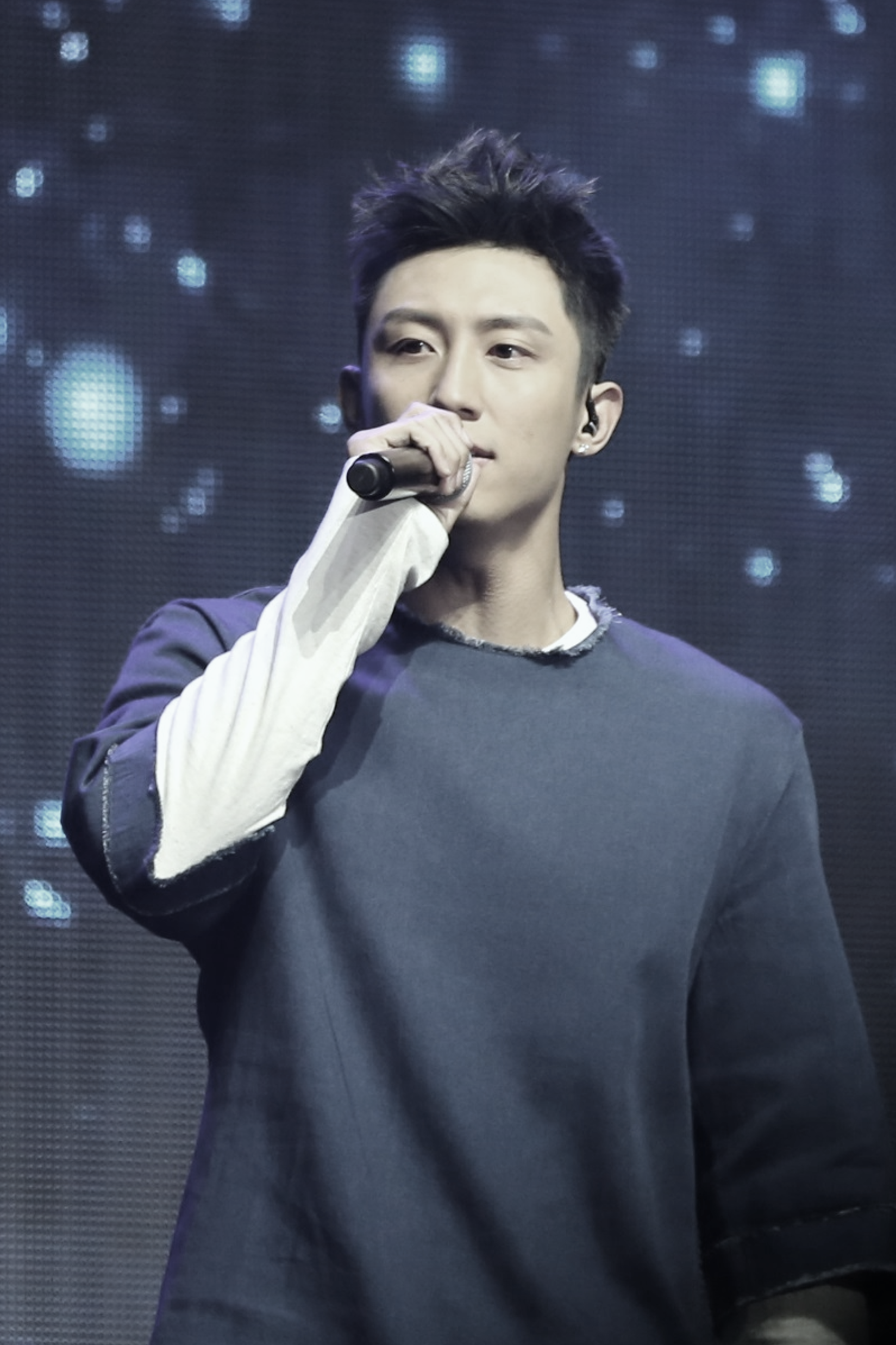
- Huang in 2016
- Born: November 30, 1992 (age 33); Dandong, Liaoning, China
- Other name: Johnny Huang
- Education: Eastern Liaoning University
- Occupations: Actor; model
- Years active: 2016–present
- Agent: Lucida Entertainment

Huang Jingyu (Chinese: 黄景瑜; pinyin: Huángjǐngyú; born November 30, 1992), also known as Johnny Huang, is a Chinese actor and model. He is known for his roles in Addicted (2016), Operation Red Sea (2018), Moonshine and Valentine (2018), and The Thunder (2019). He ranked 28th on Forbes China Celebrity 100 list in 2019 and 36th in 2020.

== Early life ==
Huang went to Eastern Liaoning University to be a flight attendant. He had worked several part-time jobs before he was introduced by his friends to work as a model.

Huang has practiced Brazilian jiu-jitsu and participated in many competitions. He has also won championships held in Shanghai Brazilian jiu-jitsu College.

== Career ==
In 2016, Huang made his acting debut in the BL web drama Addicted, which propelled him to fame. The drama was then banned by SAPPRFT before its finale due to its depiction of homosexuality. That same year, Huang appeared in the fantasy web drama Demon Girl 2.

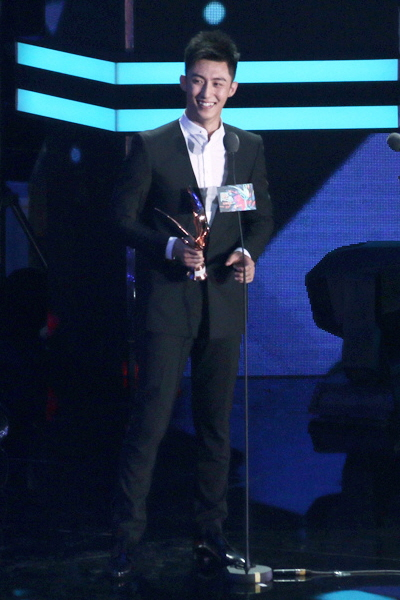
Huang Jingyu in April 2016

In 2018, Huang starred in the action film Operation Red Sea, directed by Dante Lam, which became the highest-grossing Chinese film of that year. His performance in the film earned him the Best Newcomer Award at the Asian Film Awards. The same year, Huang starred in the romance dramas Moonshine and Valentine and My Story for You. Forbes China listed Huang under their 30 Under 30 Asia 2017 list.

In 2019, Huang starred in the comedy film Pegasus directed by Han Han and police drama The Thunder. In 2020, Huang starred in the romance drama Love Advanced Customization.

== Other activities ==
=== Endorsements and fashion ===
In 2016, Huang became the first celebrity to be featured on the China Merchants Bank's bank card. In June, he was invited to the Dolce & Gabbana Spring/Summer 2017 fashion show during Milan Fashion Week as one of the "Millennials".

In 2017, he was chosen as the first male ambassador and spokesperson of international brand Pantene.

In 2018, he was appointed as the China's spokesperson and ambassador of the two perfume brands, Dior Fragrance and Elizabeth Arden. In August, he became the new ambassador of Sebastian Professional and Johnnie Walker. Later, he was honored as the first Chinese Brand Ambassador of Abercrombie & Fitch. In October, he was appointed as the global spokesperson of the two skincare brands SNP (Shining Nature Purity) and Sesderma.

In 2021, Bally appointed Huang as its global brand ambassador.

=== Ambassadorship ===
In 2017, Huang attended the "15th Strait Youth Forum" and was awarded the title of "The Messenger of Youth Cultural Exchange between Fujian and Taiwan". The same year, he was invited to the forum "Deciphering New Opportunities in Chinese Film" sponsored by Shanghai International Film Festival and NetEase Entertainment, and accepted the letter of appointment to become NetEase "Star Editor".

In January 2019, Huang was appointed as youth ambassador of 13th Asian Film Awards.

== Filmography ==
=== Film ===
Year	English title	Chinese title	Role	Ref.
2018	Operation Red Sea	红海行动	Gu Shun	
2019	Pegasus	飞驰人生	Lin Zhendong	
2019	Mao Zedong 1949	决胜时刻	Chen Youfu	
2020	Lost in Russia	囧妈	Da Long (Cameo)	
2020	Wild Grass	荞麦疯长	Wu Feng	
2020	Oversize Love	月半爱丽丝	Han Bing	
2023	The Procurator	检察风云	Qu Sheng	
2024	Formed Police Unit	维和防暴队	Yu Weidong	
2024	Pegasus 2	飞驰人生2	Lin Zhendong	
2026	Pegasus 3	飞驰人生3	Lin Zhendong	
TBA	Circulation	循环	A Ji	

=== Television series ===
Year	English title	Chinese title	Role	Network	Ref.
2016	Addicted	上瘾	Gu Hai	iQiyi	
2016	Demon Girl II	半妖倾城II	Nurhaci	Mango TV	
2018	Moonshine and Valentine	结爱·千岁大人的初恋	Helan Jingting	Tencent Video	
2018	My Story for You	为了你我愿意热爱整个世界	Changgong Wei	iQiyi	
2019	The Thunder	破冰行动	Li Fei	CCTV	
2020	Love Designer	幸福触手可及	Song Lin	Hunan TV	
2020	Together	在一起	Lu Chaoyang	Dragon TV	
2020	Something Just Like This	青春创世纪	Duan Ran	iQiyi	
2021	Lucky with You	三生有幸遇上你	Hou Juejie	Youku	
2021	My Dear Guardian	爱上特种兵	Liang Muze	iQiyi	
2021	Ace Troops	王牌部队	Gao Liang	iQiyi	
2022	Chasing the Undercurrent	罚罪	Chang Zheng	iQiyi	
2023	Bright Eyes in the Dark	他从火光中走来	Lin Luxiao	iQiyi	
2024	Lost Identity	孤战迷城	Ou Xiao'an	iQiyi, Tencent Video	
2024	The First Shot	雪迷宫	Zheng Bei	Youku	
2024	Love Song in Winter	冬至	Jiang Chengyi	iQiyi	
2025	The Punishment	罚罪 第二季	Qin Feng	iQiyi	
2026	Our Dazzling Days	岁月有情时	Zhang Xiaoman	CCTV, iQiyi	
TBA	Winner	赢风	Lu Yunxiang	CCTV, Tencent Video	
TBA	Zhong Qi	重器	Chen Yizhong	iQiyi	
TBA	Love Song in Summer	明川有知夏	Li Zechuan	iQiyi	
TBA	Sea of Dreams	梦之海	Jiang Xingbei	Youku	
TBA	Cat & Thief	斗贼	Third Brother Ping		

=== Variety shows ===
Year	English title	Chinese title	Role	Ref.
2016	Date with Star	约吧！大明星	Cast member	
2017	King of Glory	王者出击	Cast member	
2018	Let Go of My Baby S03	放开我北鼻 第3季	Cast member	
2019	Chase Me	追我吧	Cast member	
2021	Mr. Housework S03	做家务的男人 第3季	Cast member	
2022	Go fighting! S08	极限挑战 第8季	Cast member	
2024	Natural High; Season:2	现在就出发	Recurring Member	
2025	Natural High; Season:3	现在就出发	Regular Member	

== Discography ==
=== Singles ===
Year	English title	Chinese title	Album	Ref.
2015	"Oath of the Sea"	海若有因	Addicted OST	
2016	"Date with Star"	约吧！大明星	Date with Star OST	
2018	"Operation Red Sea"	红海行动	Operation Red Sea OST	
2019	"My Motherland and I"	我和我的祖国	Qing Chun Wei Zu Guo Er Chang	
2020	"Colorful Days"		Wild Grass OST	
2022	"Only the Way is Ordinary"	只道是寻常	Ace Troops OST	
2022	"Longing"	渴望	Ace Troops OST	
2022	"Never been Apart"	从未分离过	Ace Troops OST	

== Accolades ==
Year	Award	Category	Nominated work	Result	Ref.
2016	16th Top Chinese Music Awards	Media Recommended New Idol	Huang Jingyu	Won	
2016	Cosmo Fashion for Dream Award Ceremony	Dream Fashionable Figure	Huang Jingyu	Won	
2016	23rd Cosmo Beauty Ceremony	Rising Idol of the Year	Huang Jingyu	Won	
2016	2016 Netease Attitude Awards	New Force National Idol	Huang Jingyu	Won	
2016	Youku Young Choice Award Ceremony	Promising Idol of the Year	Huang Jingyu	Won	
2017	2016 Powerstar's Award Ceremony	Most Popular Promising Newcomer	Huang Jingyu	Won	
2017	2017 Instyle Icon Awards	Most Popular Male Artiste of the Year	Huang Jingyu	Won	
2017	GQ Men of the Year 2017	New Artiste of the Year	Huang Jingyu	Won	
2017	24th Cosmo Beauty Ceremony	Beautiful Idol of the Year	Huang Jingyu	Won	
2017	8th DoNews Award Ceremony	Entertainment Figure of the Year	Huang Jingyu	Won	
2018	Interest Tribe Appreciation Night	Most Commercially Valuable Actor	Huang Jingyu	Won	
2018	2018 Baidu Entertainment Award	Person of the Year	Huang Jingyu	Won	
2018	2018 Baidu Entertainment Award	Popular Star of the Year	Huang Jingyu	Won	
2018	24th Huading Awards	Best Actor (Modern Drama)	Moonshine and Valentine	Won	
2018	14th Changchun Film Festival	Best Supporting Actor	Operation Red Sea	Nominated	
2018	34th Hundred Flowers Awards	Best Newcomer	Operation Red Sea	Nominated	
2018	31st Tokyo International Film Festival - Gold Crane Award	Most Popular Actor	Operation Red Sea	Won	
2018	Golden Bud - The Third Network Film And Television Festival	Best Actor (Web Drama)	Moonshine and Valentine	Nominated	
2018	15th Esquire China's Man At His Best Awards	Annual Breakthrough Award	Huang Jingyu	Nominated	
2019	13th Asian Film Awards	Best Newcomer	Operation Red Sea	Won	
2019	25th Huading Awards	Best Newcomer	Operation Red Sea	Nominated	
2019	6th The Actors of China Award Ceremony	Best Actor (Emerald Category)	The Thunder	Nominated	
2019	26th Huading Awards	Best Actor (Modern drama)	The Thunder	Nominated	
2019	Golden Bud - The Fourth Network Film And Television Festival	Best Actor	The Thunder	Nominated	
2019	16th Guangzhou Student Film Festival	Most Popular Supporting Actor	Pegasus	Won	
2019	11th China TV Drama Awards	Youth Charismatic Actor	Huang Jingyu	Won	
2020	7th The Actors of China Award	Best Actor (Emerald)	Huang Jingyu	Nominated	
2021	Weibo Movie Night	Breakthrough Actor of the Year	Huang Jingyu	Won	
2022	Golden Lotus - Macau International Movie and Television Festival	Best Actor	Chasing the Undercurrent	Nominated	
