= Zhang Yangyang =

Zhang Yangyang may refer to:

- Zhang Yangyang (rower) (born 1989), Chinese rower
- Zhang Yangyang (singer) (born 1991), Chinese singer
