= Elu (disambiguation) =

ELU or Elu may refer to:

== Languages ==
- Elu, a Middle Indo-Aryan language, or Prakrit
- Elu language (Papua New Guinea) (ISO 639: elu), an Austronesian language

== Places ==
- Elu (woreda), an administrative ward of Ethiopia
- Guemar Airport, serving El Oued, Algeria

== Fictional characters ==
- Elu Thingol, a fictional character in J.R.R. Tolkien's Middle-earth legendarium
- Elu (comics), a fictional character from DC Comics

== Other uses ==
- Eastern Liaoning University, in Dandong, China
- English Lacrosse Union, now the English Lacrosse Association
- Exponential linear unit (neural networks)
- ELU, a German tool producer now part of DeWalt
- Elu, a title used in the Scottish Rite
- Elu, a neopronoun used in the Portuguese language to refer to non-binary and gender-unspecified people
