= Legend of a Rabbit: The Martial of Fire =

- Film poster
- 兔侠之青黎传说
- Directed by: Ma Yuan; Dong Dake
- Production companies: TianJin BeiFang Film Group Co., LTD; Beijing Century Butterfly Animation Production Co., Ltd; Beijing Luyi Jiuying Pictures Media Co., Ltd; China Beijing Television Station; Toonmax Media Co., Ltd; Tianjin Radio and television
- Distributed by: Beijing Wanzhong Canlan Entertainment Co., Ltd; Beijing Xinghe Lianmeng Entertainment Co., Ltd; YL Pictures; American Aurora Pictures International Ltd
- Release date: 21 February 2015
- Running time: 90 minutes
- Country: China
- Languages: Mandarin; English; Russian; Latin Spanish (Mexico)
- Box office: US$29.723 million (China)

Legend of a Rabbit: The Martial of Fire (Chinese: 兔侠之青黎传说 Tùxiá zhīqīng lí Chuánshuō) also known as Rise of the Rabbit in the United Kingdom, is a 2015 Chinese animated action adventure film directed by Ma Yuan and Dong Dake, the sequel to Legend of a Rabbit. It was released on 21 February 2015.

== Plot ==
It has been a couple of years since Tu defeated Slash. Tu is now regarded as the protector of the village, defeating bandits and upholding justice. However, with no skills, Tu has to start training to harness the kung fu skills he inherited from the grandmaster. One day, Fu rescues an old injured warrior who turns out to be the evil Zhan. Zhan is badly injured and Fu decides to keep him safe because Zhan told him that he is in danger. This is just a plan as Zhan plans to take over the world of martial arts by acquiring a martial of fire from Lan of Huell Clan. Lan is the leader of Huell clan, who are the guardians of Martial of fire, and nobody can cross the barrier between martial and the temple of fire. Zhane fools Tu because only Tu, after getting the powers of Grandmaster Ape, can cross the barrier. Fu fails to save Laun and the martial of fire, and realizes he is just a lucky rabbit who happened to inherit the grandmaster's kung fu, but Penny encourages him to practice and go for it. He starts to practice hard with Laun and Penny, as they both know kung fu very well. Becky is also eventually able to join them in stopping Zhan's evil plan, as Becky has been thrown in a valley by Zhane. This finally makes Fu able to overthrow Zhan by holding the true harmony of the martial of fire.

== Voice cast ==
- Huang Lei as Tu
- Yang Zishan as Bai Lan
- He Yunwei as Biggie
- Wang Jinsong as Zhan Tian
- Wang Yuebo as Aman
- Ma Yuan as Ajian
- Zhao Huishan as Peony
- Zhou Qixun as Shifu
- Wang Di as Yuan
- Li Xiaochen as Chuan
- Zhang Yixin as Shan
- Li Zhou as Jia and Xiaochun

== Reception ==
The film earned CN¥29.723 million at the Chinese box office.

== Awards ==
| Award | Category | Result | Ref |
|---|---|---|---|
| Golden Rooster | Best Animated Feature | Nominated | |

== See also ==
- Legend of a Rabbit
