= Matt Wu =

Taiwanese actor

- 吳中天
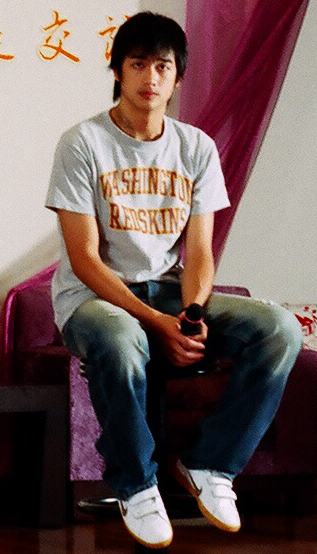
- Wu in Feng Chia University, 2007
- Born: July 5, 1981 (age 45); Taiwan
- Education: National Taiwan University of Arts (BFA)
- Occupations: Actor; film director; screenwriter
- Spouse: Yang Zishan (m. 2015)

Chinese name
- Traditional Chinese: 吳中天
- Simplified Chinese: 吴中天
Transcriptions
Standard Mandarin
- Hanyu Pinyin: Wú Zhōngtiān
Southern Min
- Hokkien POJ: Ngô͘ Tiong-thian

Matt Wu Chung-tien (Chinese: 吳中天; Pe̍h-ōe-jī: Ngô͘ Tiong-thian; born July 5, 1981) is a Taiwanese actor, director, and screenwriter.

His short film Stairway (四十三階) won Best Asian Short Film Award at the 19th Busan International Film Festival in 2014.

== Personal life ==
In 2006, he co-wrote a book with Kingone Wang titled Men's Talk (型男Talk).

Wu married actress Yang Zishan in 2015. They met while starring in a 7-minute romantic drama in Taiwan as the 12th segment of the web series Female Zodiac Stories (清蜜星體驗女生版).

== Filmography ==
=== Film ===
==== As actor ====
Year	English title	Mandarin title	Role	Notes
2006	The Touch of Fate	指間的重量	Lee	Nominated—Golden Horse Award for Best Supporting Actor; Nominated—Golden Horse Award for Best Newcomer
2008	Ballistic	彈道	Pang Ta-sung	
2008	The Fatality	絕魂印	Stanley	
2008	The Taste of Orange Paste	桔醬的滋味	Tony	TV film Nominated—Golden Bell Award for Best Supporting Actor in a miniseries/TV film
2009	Our Island, Our Dreams	星月無盡		
2009	Finding Shangri-La	這兒是香格里拉	Alex	
2009	Team of Miracle: We Will Rock You	流浪漢世界盃		
2009	Old Time Camera Shop	舊情照相館		TV film Nominated—Golden Bell Award for Best Supporting Actor in a miniseries/TV film
2010	Reign of Assassins	劍雨		
2011	10+10	十加十		Segment 17: "The Singing Boy" (唱歌男孩)
2011	Make Up	命運化妝師	Nieh Cheng-fu	
2011	Road Less Traveled	樂之路		
2012	Black & White Episode I: The Dawn of Assault	痞子英雄首部曲:全面開戰		
2012	Together	甜．秘密		
2013	As the Winds Blow	戀戀海灣	Yuh	
2013	The Straits	海峽		
2014	Sweet Alibis	甜蜜殺機	Wu Chung-tien; Wu Chung-ti	
2014	My Geeky Nerdy Buddies	大宅們	Shou-cheng	
2014	Sway	三城戀習曲	Arthur Wei	
2016	Godspeed	一路順風	Hsiao-wu	
TBA	Sex Agogo	72小時莎到你		

==== As filmmaker ====
Year	English title	Mandarin title	Role	Notes
2014	Stairway	四十三階	Director, screenwriter	Short film
2016	One Night Only	天亮之前	Director	

=== Television ===
Year	English title	Mandarin title	Role	Notes
2001	Marmalade Boy	橘子醬男孩	Hsiao-ming	
2001	Blue Star	藍星	Mu Kei-wei	
2002	Rock and Roll	搖滾沙士	Kuang Yen	
2002	Spicy Teacher	麻辣鮮師	Kuo Chien-chung	
2005	Devil Beside You	惡魔在身邊		
2006	Bump Off Lover	愛殺17		
2007	Sweet Relationship	美味關係		
2008	Letter 1949	我在1949，等你	Edward	
2010	The Kite Soaring	牽紙鷂的手		Nominated—Golden Bell Award for Best Supporting Actor in a TV Series
2011	Innocence	阿戇妹	Prosecutor	
2011	Remember, About Us	記得·我們有約	Yang Wen-tai	
2011	Soldier: The Glorious Moment	勇士們—光榮時刻	Zhang Zizhong	
2012	Once Upon a Love	原來愛.就是甜蜜	Hsu Yeh	
