= The Procurator =

- Theatrical release poster
- Traditional Chinese: 檢察風雲
- Simplified Chinese: 检察风云
- Hanyu Pinyin: Jian cha feng yun
- Directed by: Alan Mak
- Written by: Alan Mak; Zhao Peng
- Produced by: Rita Zhang
- Starring: Johnny Huang; Bai Baihe; Wang Likun
- Cinematography: Kenny Tse
- Edited by: Du Junlin
- Music by: Zhu Zhendong
- Distributed by: China Lion Film Distribution
- Release date: 29 April 2023
- Running time: 112 minutes
- Country: China
- Language: Mandarin
- Box office: US$9.1 million

The Procurator (Chinese: 检察风云; pinyin: Jian cha feng yun) is a 2023 Chinese crime drama film directed by Alan Mak, and starring Johnny Huang, Bai Baihe, and Wang Likun. The film was released on April 29, 2023, by China Lion Film.

== Plot ==
College professor Xia Wei is on trial for murder for killing Chen Xin, a man involved in the rape of her student Ye Xiaohuan three months earlier. Xia Wei remains silent without making a statement, so the procurator Li Rui begins his arguments, connecting the parties involved in the crime to the criminal underworld of the Liucheng District as well as to the robbery of the Tang Dynasty Empress Tomb thirty years earlier and Mayor Yan Zhitian himself.

== Cast ==
- Johnny Huang as Li Rui
- Bai Baihe as Tong Yuchen
- Wang Likun as Xia Wei
- Wang Qianyuan as Zhang Youcheng
- Feng Shaofeng as Hong Junshan
- Bao Bei'er as Chen Xin
- Shi Zhaoqi as Zhao Mingcheng
- Yu Rongguang as Yan Zhitian
- Liang Songqing as Ye Xiaohuan
- Kou Zhenhai as Presiding judge
- Tin Kai-man as Library director
- Liu Yiwei as Tu Long

== Production ==
The script was co-written by Zhao Peng, a veteran procurator who drew inspiration from real cases for the script. The film was shot in China.

== Release ==
The film was released theatrically in China on 29 April 2023, followed by a short run in New Zealand.

== Reception ==
Derek Elley of Sino-Cinema gave the film a rating of 6 out of 10, writing, "Part courtroom drama, part crime procedural, this ends up being not especially involving on either count, though a strong cast makes it watchable."

Reviewer Joshua Polanski of bostonhassle.com wrote, "The genius of Mak’s storytelling is still there—one just has to be willing to do a little archeology to uncover it."

Reviewer Kyle McGrath of lilithia.net wrote, "The Procurator is a stylish murder mystery with some refreshingly intriguing ideas and an exceptional cast. Peng’s script takes us in some unexpected directions while exploring aspects of the Chinese legal system that I personally was unaware of before now. While not every scene hits with the intended impact, Alan Mak's strong direction ensures that The Procurator remains a thrilling ride."

Reviewer Carla Hay of Culture Mix wrote, "'The Procurator' is a very good but not outstanding legal thriller with some intriguing layers to the story. [...] 'The Procurator' is a slick, sometimes-violent thriller that should please viewers who don’t want the answers to murder mysteries to be too obvious."

Reviewer Jason of Jay's Movie Blog gave the film a rating of 2 and a half out of 4, writing, "Co-writer/director Alan Mak Siu-Fai looks for ways to inject something into what looks like an open and shut case, with the most consequential probably being Xia's fuzzy memory, although that is seemingly more for the audience than the courtroom for all that the attorneys mention it. Aside from that, everything winds up too tightly plotted, without any room for even the slightest of red herrings, and attempts to make the title character interesting fall flat. [...] It's a movie that has all the pieces for a good crime story and murder mystery, but for whatever reasons, Mak can't put them together in their best arrangement. Instead, he seems to take the most direct path from A to B when the genre demands it be sneakily circuitous."

Reviewer Richard Gray of The Reel Bits gave the film a rating of 3 out of 5, writing, "Even as the courtroom summation attempts to tie it all together, I have to admit I still wasn’t entirely sure about it all. Still, THE PROCURATOR is never anything less than entertaining, and could certainly be fleshed out into a series of films in the future."

== Accolades ==
The film was nominated for the Jury Award for Best Film at the 2023 Beijing College Student Film Festival.
