= Oversize Love =

- Traditional Chinese: 月半愛麗絲
- Simplified Chinese: 月半爱丽丝
- Hanyu Pinyin: Yuè bàn àilì sī
- Directed by: Zhang Linzi
- Screenplay by: Jin Yimeng & Sun Siyu
- Produced by: Liu Yang
- Starring: Guan Xiaotong; Huang Jingyu
- Production companies: Beijing Yingke Dafang Media Co., Ltd.
- Release date: 30 October 2020
- Running time: 318 minutes
- Country: China
- Language: Mandarin

Oversize Love (Chinese: 月半爱丽丝; pinyin: Yuè bàn àilì sī) is a romance film directed by Zhang Linzi and starring Guan Xiaotong and Huang Jingyu. The film was released in mainland China on October 30, 2020.

== Premise ==
The film tells the story of a fat girl, Lin Xiaoxi, who lost herself because she chose to rely on magic to cater to other people's definitions of beauty. However, she was no longer bound by traditional aesthetic standards, took the initiative to break the dream that magic had created for herself, and finally won true happiness.

== Cast ==
- Guan Xiaotong as Lin Xiao Tong
- Huang Jingyu as Han Bing
- Darren Chen as Huang Ke
- Pan Yue Ming as James
- Lu Shan as Song Wenlu
- Chang Long as Azheng
- Yang Dongqi as new director
- Fan Ming as Uncle Geng
- Zhao Yingjun as Brother Re
- Luo Jiaying as the mysterious old man

== Production ==
In order to gain weight, Guan Xiaotong needed to undergo special effects makeup for up to 5 or 6 hours at a time. During the filming, Guan Xiaotong had to wear thick silicone all over her body and even suffered from prickly heat.

== Reception ==
A review from Qilu Evening News stated, after losing weight to immediately enter the entertainment industry and be pursued by stars is an unrealistic setting that lacks empathy and creates a fairy tale love that is not like the fireworks of the world. Guan Xiaotong's image of a fat woman is a bit confusing, and there is no trace of the movements and behavior patterns that fat people should have in real life. The special effects of Guan Xiaotong's fattening were also a little too unrealistic, with more and more prosthetics sometimes missing.
