= Reen Yu =

Taiwanese actress and model (born 1987)

- Born: October 22, 1987 (age 37); Taiwan
- Occupation(s): Actress, model
- Years active: 2008–2013
- Spouse: Vic Zhou

Chinese name
- Traditional Chinese: 喻虹淵
- Simplified Chinese: 喻虹渊
Transcriptions
Standard Mandarin
- Hanyu Pinyin: Yù Hóngyuān
- Musical career
- Also known as: Xiaoyuan (小渊)
- Labels: Prajna

Reen Yu (born October 22, 1987) is a Taiwanese actress and model.

== Biography ==
Yu was born Hongyuan Yu on October 22, 1987 in Tʻao-yüan hsien, Taiwan.

Yu has studied at Fu Jen Catholic University, department of philosophy. While she attended high school, she appeared in music videos and commercials. In 2009, she took on a small role in the Taiwanese television series Black & White. Her outstanding performance in the series received a good response from netizens.

== Filmography ==
=== Television series ===
Year	Title	Status	Role
200?	波西米亞進行曲 V5	Television	??
2008	籃球火 / Hot Shot	Television	Zhan Jie Er (younger) / 湛潔兒
2008	這裡發現愛 / Wish To See You Again	Television	Lu Yi (younger) / 陸怡
2009	痞子英雄 / Black & White	Television	He Xiao Mei / 何小玫
2010	愛似百匯 / Love Buffet	Television	Hu Xiao Feng / 胡小風 / Fuuko
2011	勇士們 / Soldier	Television	Du Yuan (杜媛)
2012	白色之戀 / Die Sterntaler	Television	Xia Xiang Qi (夏祥琪)
2012	原來愛.就是甜蜜 / Once Upon a Love	Television	Xu Juan Juan (徐娟娟)
2012	愛情女僕 / Lady Maid Maid	Television	Liu Shu-qi (劉舒琪)

=== Music videos ===
Year	Artist	Title of the Song
2004	Mayday	聽不到
2004	Endy Chow	告一段落
2005	JJ Lin	豆漿油條
2006	Sun Ho	做你的公主
2006	Bobby Chen	不再
2007	音樂鐵人	幸福快樂
2008	Fahrenheit	為你存在
2009	Nylon Chen	不再
2009	Jam Hsiao	祝你幸福
2009	ThomasJack	《因为你》音乐爱情故事
2010	AK	一秒鐘
2011	Color	我沒有你要的快樂
2012	Jenny Liang	愛沒那麼簡單
2013	Magic Power	忘了怎麼愛你

=== Movies ===
Year	Title	Role
2011	Hand in Hand	
2010	艋舺 / MONGA	Xiao Hui / 小惠
