= Moonshine and Valentine =

- Drama poster
- Also known as: The Love Knot: His Excellency's First Love
- Genre: Fantasy; Romance
- Based on: Jie Ai·Yihe Fenghuan by Shi Dingrou
- Written by: Freddie Shen
- Directed by: Leste Chen; Hsu Chao-jen
- Starring: Victoria Song; Huang Jingyu
- Composer: Tina C. Wang
- Country of origin: China
- Original language: Mandarin
- No. of seasons: 1
- No. of episodes: 25

Production
- Producers: Yang Yali; Yuan Feiyu
- Production locations: Bangkok, Thailand
- Running time: 45 mins
- Production companies: Tencent Penguin Pictures; Mango Studios; Dream Weaver
- Budget: ¥ 140 million

Original release
- Network: Tencent
- Release: May 9 – June 13, 2018

Moonshine and Valentine (Chinese: 结爱·千岁大人的初恋), also known as The Love Knot: His Excellency's First Love, is a 2018 Chinese streaming television series based on the novel Jie Ai·Yihe Fenghuan (Chinese: 结爱·异客逢欢) by Shi Dingrou. The series was directed by Leste Chen, and stars Victoria Song and Huang Jingyu. It aired on Tencent Video from May 9, 2018 and ended on June 13, 2018.

== Synopsis ==
Guan Pipi (Victoria Song)'s life was normal and peaceful until she meets a man called Helan Jingting (Huang Jingyu). Helan is an alien "fox" who has lived for a millennium, while Pipi is a seemingly normal human. It is revealed through flashbacks that in Pipi's first lifetime, she (named Hui Yan then) was a sacrifice to cure Helan's health issues. As a result, she never lives beyond 25 years old. Unexpectedly, they fell in love, and now Helan searches for Pipi in each of her lifetime. In modern day, Helan searches for a cure for Pipi's curse.

== Cast ==
=== Main ===
- Victoria Song as Guan Pipi / Hui Yan

An intern at a newspaper publishing company. She is the reincarnation of Hui Yan, Helan Jingting's beloved wife.

- Huang Jingyu as Helan Jingting

Right priest of the Fox clan. He is the son of Princess Xiyan and a human. As a result, he was born with an eye condition that rendered him unable to see until he drinks a liquid containing the liver of Hui Yan. He disguises himself as an antiques collector.

=== Supporting ===
==== Fox clan ====
- Li Jiaming as Kuan Yong

Helan Jingting's sidekick. He is calm and composed, and is considerate toward others.

- Li Shen as Xiu Xian

Helan Jingting's sidekick. He is bubbly and talkative.

- Jiang Qilin as Zhao Song

Left priest of the Fox Clan. He has a one-sided love for Qian Hua. He is at odds with Helan Jingting, whom he considers as his rival.

- Zhang Baijia as Tushan Qian Hua

A distinguished lady of the Tushan family. She has a one-sided love for Helan Jingting, and would do anything for him.

- Su Ke as Qing Mu

Ruler of the Fox clan. Helan Jingting's father.

- Wang Xin as Bo Zhong

Princess Zhaoyan's subordinate.

- Yang Kaidi as Su Mei

A woman who ends up befriending Guan Pipi and gives her advice.

- Wang Jianing as Fang Jinxue

A mysterious celebrity who used to have a crush on Kuan Yong.

- Yang Zishan as Princess Xiyan

Helan Jingting's birth mother.

- Li Yijuan as Princess Zhaoyan

==== People around Guan Pipi ====
- Liu Yongxi as Xiao Ju

Guan Pipi's close friend. She becomes involved in a love triangle between Kuan Yong and Xiu Xian.

- Xu Kaicheng as Tao Jialin

Guan Pipi's first love. He later betrays her by becoming romantically involved with Tian Xin behind Pipi's back.

- Xu Fangyi as Tian Xin

Guan Pipi's close friend. She later betrays her by becoming romantically involved with Tao Jialin behind Pipi's back.

- Ma Xiaoyuan as Wang Xuan

A nosy reporter who becomes involved in the affairs of the Fox clan.

== Production ==
The series was filmed at Bangkok, Thailand from September to December 2017.

== Reception ==
Moonshine and Valentine received positive reviews for its high quality production, tight plot and fresh characterizations. Both leads, Song and Huang, were praised for their performance and use of original voices. The series also garnered more than 2 billion views in Tencent before the series ended.

However, the later episodes received criticism for its abrupt change in plot direction and decreased screentime of the leads. In response to this, the scriptwriter published a written apology on Weibo, asking the viewers not to blame the director and the actors for the collapse in narrative.

== Soundtrack ==
No.	Title	Lyrics	Music	Singers	Length
1.	"A Glance at a Thousand Year Old Romance (一眼千恋)" (Ending theme song)	Chen Weilun	Ling Jing	Fang Yuan
2.	"The Love Knot (结爱)"	Chen Weilun	Shen Yadong	Zhang Yangyang
3.	"Zhuque Street (朱雀街)"	Song Bingyang	Song Bingyang, Zhi Mo	Song Bingyang
4.	"Goodnight Goodbye"		Song Bingyang	Song Bingyang & Huang Shuhui

== Awards and nominations ==
Award	Category	Nominated work	Result	Ref.
24th Huading Awards	Best Actor (Modern Drama)	Huang Jingyu	Won	
Golden Bud - The Third Network Film And Television Festival	Top Ten Series	Moonshine and Valentine	Won	
12th Tencent Video Star Awards	Top Ten Series	Moonshine and Valentine	Won	
30th China TV Golden Eagle Award	Outstanding Television Series	Moonshine and Valentine	Won	
30th China TV Golden Eagle Award	Audience's Choice for Actress	Victoria Song	Nominated	
