= Love Designer =

2020 Chinese television series

- Drama poster
- Simplified Chinese: 爱情高级定制
- Hanyu Pinyin: Àiqíng Gāojí Dìngzhì
- Genre: Romance; Business
- Written by: Li Ran Ning (李染宁); Wang Fang (王芳); Zhang Zi Wei (张紫微)
- Directed by: Shen Yang (沈阳)
- Starring: Dilraba Dilmurat; Huang Jingyu
- Country of origin: China
- Original language: Mandarin
- No. of episodes: 51

Production
- Producer: Xu Li
- Production locations: Shanghai, China
- Running time: 40–45 minutes
- Production companies: Wanda Media; Innovation Media Power; Tomorrow Film

Original release
- Network: Hunan TV
- Release: 19 May – 21 June 2020

Love Designer (Chinese: 爱情高级定制; pinyin: Àiqíng Gāojí Dìngzhì) is a 2020 Chinese television series, starring Dilraba Dilmurat and Huang Jingyu. It premiered on Hunan TV from May 19 to June 21, 2020.

== Synopsis ==
Fashion designer Zhou Fang and a boss of an e-commerce company Song Lin meet because of a commercial lawsuit, but they were forced to cooperate because of the ties between life and work. The two stubborn people collided with each other and the contradictions were overwhelming. But they grew up in each other's strengths, and at the same time found the inner part of each other and gradually fell in love.

== Cast and characters ==
Main cast

- Dilraba Dilmurat as Zhou Fang, a fashion designer. She is independent and smart.
- Huang Jingyu as Song Lin, a boss of an e-commerce company. He became a much more open person after Zhou Fang appeared in his life.

Supporting cast

- Zhang Xinyu as Qin Qing, Zhou Fang's best friend, and Zuo Yulin's girlfriend.
- Yi Da Qian as Zuo Yulin, Song Lin's friend, and Qin Qing's boyfriend.
- Hu Bing as Su Yushan, Song Lin's competitor. The brand ‘April’ is very important to him.
- Zheng Shui Jing as Song Luo, Song Lin's younger sister. She starts off as a very naughty and rebellious student with bad grades but matures after she becomes best friends with Shen Di.

== Ratings ==
- Highest ratings are marked in red, lowest ratings are marked in blue

Hunan Satellite TV CSM59 City ratings
Episode #	Original air date	Ratings	Audience share	Rank
1–2	May 19, 2020	2.495%	9.59%	1
3–4	May 20, 2020	2.496%	9.75%	1
5–6	May 21, 2020	2.42%	9.17%	1
7	May 22, 2020	2.312%	7.95%	1
8	May 23, 2020	2.019%	7.26%	1
9–10	May 24, 2020	2.243%	8.68%	1
11–12	May 25, 2020	2.389%	8.39%	1
13–14	May 26, 2020	2.565%	9.94%	1
15–16	May 27, 2020	2.395%	9.5%	1
17–18	May 28, 2020	2.34%	8.94%	1
19	May 29, 2020	2.23%	7.97%	1
20	May 30, 2020	1.995%	7.1%	1
21–22	June 1, 2020	2.362%	8.73%	1
23–24	June 2, 2020	2.432%	9.32%	1
25–26	June 3, 2020	2.195%	8.42%	1
27–28	June 4, 2020	2.239%	8.5%	1
29	June 5, 2020	1.413%	5.09%	4
30	June 6, 2020	1.079%	3.97%	6
31–32	June 8, 2020	1.991%	7.51%	2
33–34	June 9, 2020	2.146%	8.17%	1
35–36	June 10, 2020	2.16%	8.36%	1
37–38	June 11, 2020	2.109%	8.28%	1
39	June 12, 2020	2.533%	9.76%	1
40	June 13, 2020	1.857%	7.17%	1
41–42	June 14, 2020	2.072%	8.03%	1
43–44	June 15, 2020	1.982%	7.68%	1
45–46	June 16, 2020	1.879%	7.22%	1
47–48	June 18, 2020	1.945%	7.91%	1
49	June 19, 2020	2.229%	8.81%	1
50	June 20, 2020	0.492%	1.9%	8
51	June 21, 2020	1.989%	7.16%	2
