= Zhang Yangyang (singer) =

Chinese pop singer (born 1991)

Zhang Yangyang, Yangyang Eryang 张阳阳
- Born: October 1, 1991 (age 34), Emin County, Xinjiang, China
- Genres: Pop
- Occupation: Singer
- Instrument: Guitar
- Years active: 2013-present
- Website: http://www.weibo.com/u/3091062183

Zhang Yangyang (Yangyang Eryang born October 1, 1991) is a Chinese pop singer, who rose to fame through 2013 Super Boy, one of the most popular televised singing competition, by winning the 6th prize.

== Bibliography ==
Zhang Yangyang graduated from the Xinjiang Police College. Instead of becoming a policeman, he chose to pursue his music dream.

== Music ==
=== Singles ===
Date	Song	Album
September 17, 2013	Pursue Dream with Pure Heart 追梦赤子心	2013 Super Boys
September 17, 2013	The Bravest Love 最勇敢的爱	2013 Super Boys
Not published yet	Wind Gap 风口	

=== Soundtrack ===
Year	Song	Television series
2018	Jie Ai (结爱)	Moonshine and Valentine

=== 2013 Super Boys Contesting Songs ===
Date	Song names	Notes
July 4, 2013	Rolling In The Deep	Xi'An Division Top 10
July 11, 2013	sorry seems to be the hardest word	National Top 20
August 2, 2013	Loving is easy 爱着很简单	National Top 10
August 9, 2013	Melody	National Top 9
August 16, 2013	First Sight Love 一见钟情	National Top 8
August 23, 2013	Looking Back Again 再回首	National Top 7
August 31, 2013	No Room to Hide 无地自容、 You Exist In My Song 我的歌声里	National Top 6
September 6, 2013	Annoying Fall Wind 恼人的秋风、 Windy Night 刮风的夜晚、 Still Loving You 依然爱你	

=== Movie Soundtracks ===
《怒放2013》 soundtrack 《Goodbye Youth 青春再见》 （with 华晨宇，白举纲，左立）

=== 2013 Super Boys Concert Tours ===
- Beijing 《一见钟情》，《最勇敢的爱》， 《北京北京》 （with 白举纲，左立），《爱情鸟》（with Oho Ou）
- Shanghai 《一见钟情》，《Rolling In The Deep》，《当你》 (with 于朦胧），《爱情鸟》（with Oho Ou）
- Wuhan 《一见钟情》，《Rolling In The Deep》，《亲密爱人》（with 左立）
- Shenzhen 《我的歌声里》，《可惜不是你》，《光荣》 （with Oho Ou）
- Chongqing 《棉花糖》，《可惜不是你》，《花儿为什么这样红》+《难道》 （with 于朦胧，居来提），《光荣》（with Oho Ou）
- Nanjing
- Guangzhou
- Chengdu

=== Fans Meeting ===
- Nanjing 《Wind Gap 风口》， 《Rolling In The Deep + Bad Romance》
- Ningxiang 《First Sight Love 一见钟情》，《爱你等于爱自己》 （with 宁桓宇）
- Shenzhen 《The Bravest Love 最勇敢的爱》
- Xinjiang Christmas Party 《 Wind Gap 风口》

== TV shows ==
- Day Day Up 天天向上
- Happy Camp 快乐大本营
- Sing if you want to 想唱就唱
- Men to the left, Women to the right 男左女右
- I love super stars 我爱大牌之海涛跑快男
