= Pigeon Tango =

- Theatrical release poster
- Chinese: 盜命師
- Literal meaning: Life Stealer
- Hanyu Pinyin: Dào mìng shī
- Directed by: Lee Chi-yuarn
- Written by: Lee Chi-yuarn
- Produced by: Chien Li-fen
- Starring: Sunny Wang; Annie Chen; Jason King; Liao Chun; Lu Yi-ching; Cecilia Choi
- Cinematography: Mahua Feng
- Edited by: Lee Chi-yuarn; David Chuang
- Music by: Yoshihiro Hanno
- Production companies: Chi & Company
- Distributed by: Activator Marketing
- Release date: October 6, 2017
- Running time: 109 minutes
- Country: Taiwan
- Languages: Mandarin; Taiwanese
- Box office: NT$690,000 (Taipei)

Pigeon Tango is a 2017 Taiwanese crime thriller film written and directed by Lee Chi-yuarn. The film stars Sunny Wang, Annie Chen, Jason King, Liao Chun, Lu Yi-ching and Cecilia Choi.

== Premise ==
To repay the gambling debts her boyfriend has left behind after a fatal pigeon racing accident, Barbie, a pole dancer, meets organ dealer Malacca, who extracts her deceased boyfriend's organs. Malacca becomes Barbie's lover in the process. Meanwhile, Yang, a detective, sets up a trap to capture Malacca.

== Cast ==
- Sunny Wang as Malacca
- Annie Chen as Barbie
- Jason King as Ronin
- Liao Chun as Yang Kai-ming
- Lu Yi-ching as San-feng
- Cecilia Choi as Miu
- Yang Lie as Pan Wan-nien
- Doris Yang as Lin Bai-hui
