= Hao Lei =

Chinese actress and singer

- Born: November 1, 1978 (age 47); Tonghua, Jilin, China
- Education: Shanghai Theatre Academy
- Occupations: Actress; singer; songwriter; model
- Years active: 1998–present
- Spouses: Li Guangjie (m. 2007; div. 2009) Liu Ye (m. 2013)
- Children: 2
- Awards: Golden Horse Awards – Best Supporting Actress; 2010 The Fourth Portrait
- Musical career
- Genres: Mandopop, alternative music
- Label: in.g Group

Hao Lei (Chinese: 郝蕾; pinyin: Hǎo Lěi, born 1 November 1978) is a Chinese actress and singer, known for her starring roles in Lou Ye's films Summer Palace (2006) and Mystery (2012).

== Career ==
In 2003, Hao Lei starred in Liao Yimei's play Rhinoceros in Love in Shanghai, Beijing, Shenzhen and Seoul.

In 2006, Hao starred in Lou Ye's film Summer Palace. The film was well-received abroad, but banned in China, due to its depiction of the Tiananmen Square protests of 1989 and nudity.

== Filmography ==
=== Films ===
Year	English title	Chinese title	Role	Notes/Ref.
2001	The Story of First Love	初恋的故事	Xinyue	
2006	Summer Palace	颐和园	Yu Hong	
2008	Happy Birthday, Mr. An	生日快乐！安先生		
2009	Empire of Silver	白銀帝國	Du Yunqing	
2010	The Fourth Portrait	第四張畫	Wu Chun-lan	
2010	Love You 10000 Years	愛你一萬年		
2011	The Man Behind the Courtyard House	守望者：罪恶迷途		
2012	Love in the Buff	春嬌與志明	Shang Youyou's friend	
2012	Mystery	浮城谜事	Lu Jie	
2014	Dearest	亲爱的	Lu Xiaojuan	
2014	The Golden Era	黃金時代	Ding Ling	
2015	The Last Women Standing	剩者为王	Ms. Wang	
2016	Kill Time	谋杀似水年华	Ms. Ding	
2016	MBA Partners	梦想合伙人	Wen Qing	
2016	One Night Only	天亮之前	Yuqing	
2016	Shining Moment	灿烂这一刻	Aunt Lan	
2017	Namiya	解忧杂货店	Da Qingmei	
2018	Hello My Dog	监狱犬计划	Li Qiao	
2019	Spring Tide	春潮	Guo Jianbo	
2021	Upcoming Summer	盛夏未来	Chen Chen’s mother	
2023	Be My Family	无价之宝	Ma Shujuan	

=== TV series ===
Year	English title	Chinese title	Role	Notes/Ref.
1997	Waiting for You	等你	Shao Die	
1998	Don't Cry Seventeen	十七岁不哭	Yang Yuling	
1998	Sisters	姐妹	Yin Xiaomai	
2000	Home	缘来一家人	Jiang Jiu	
2000	The Brink	绝路	Xiaoqing	
2001	Fat Cat Finding Families	肥猫寻亲记	Fang Jixiang	
2001	Appointment in Youth	相约青春	Wang Keying	
2001	Scholar Tofu	秀才豆腐	Princess Jinling	
2001	The Beauty and the Drug	红颜烈药	Xiaoyu	
2002	Brotherhood	有情有义	Zhou Qian	
2002	The Young Wong Fei Hung	少年黃飛鴻	Dai Huolun	
2003	The Young Son of Heaven	少年天子	Empress Borjigit	
2004	The Execution of Chen Shimei	新鍘美案	Qin Xianglian	
2005	Misty Love in the Palace	煙花三月	Kong Sizhen	
2005	The Olive Tree in My Life	我生命中的橄榄树	Ah Chun	
2006	Sound of Colors	地下铁	Fu Mingming	
2006	The Tao Can Be Spoken	道可道	Gan Ruoyi	
2006	Zhang San, the Drunken Hero	醉俠張三	Li Cailian	
2006	Liu Bowen	神機妙算劉伯溫	Princess Nanfeng; Hanyan	
2007	Secret Order 1949	密令1949	Su Xiaoya	
2007	Zhu Family Garden	朱家花園	Shen Wanting	
2007	Men and Legends	精武飛鴻	Lin Siyu	
2007	After the Night: Storm	夜來風雨	Sai Shangxue	
2009	My Brother's Name Is Shun Liu	我的兄弟叫順溜	Shun Liu's sister	
2009	When Love Has Gone	当爱已成往事	Ma Fei	
2010	Notice of Missing Person	寻人启事	Han Xueman	
2010	Sister Brides	姐妹新娘	Yin Liying	
2010	Dad I Was Pregnant with Your Child	爸爸我怀了你的孩子	Leyi	
2012	The Magical Detective	通天神探	Shen Ruyue	
2015	My Elder Brother & My Sister-in-Law	我的二哥二嫂	Li Yingzi	
2015	Full Love of the Courtyard	情满四合院	Qin Huairu	
2016	The Starter Wife	头号前妻	Yan Ying	
2016	I Am Your Eyes	我是你的眼	Tian Chunni	
2019	Royal Nirvana	鹤唳华亭	Zhang Shangfu	
2019	New Fortress Besieged	热爱	Zhou Moli	
2019	Forged Sword in Desperate Situation	绝境铸剑	Mrs. Hu	
2020	East of Dongsi Archway	东四牌楼东	Tong Lihua	
2021	Bajiaoting Mysterious Fog	八角亭谜雾	Xuan Zhu	
2023	In Later Years	熟年	Zhang Chunmei	

== Discography ==
=== Album ===
Sad Things About TA 关于TA的伤心事

Studio album
- Released: June 2011
- Genres: Mandopop, alternative music
- Length: 50:02
- Label: China Record Corporation

All lyrics are written by Hao Lei.

No.	Title	Music	Length
1.	"Langzhong" (郎中; "Doctor")	Yang Jiasong	4:35
2.	"Huacai Yuezhang" (华彩乐章; "Colorful Musical Movement")	Yang Jiasong	4:09
3.	"Qianshui" (潜水; "Freediving")		4:58
4.	"Putao" (葡萄; "Grape")	Hao Lei	4:53
5.	"Wo" (我; "I")	Yang Jiasong	3:17
6.	"Ni" (你; "You")	Yang Jiasong	4:43
7.	"Woniu Yu Haidan" (蜗牛与海胆; "Snail and Sea Cucumber" — ft. Yang Jiasong)	Yang Jiasong	4:15
8.	"Tiansheng Sharenkuang" (天生杀人狂; "Natural Born Maniac Killer")	Yang Jiasong, Hao Lei	4:59
9.	"Xu Xian" (许仙 — ft. Yang Jiasong)	Yang Jiasong	5:09
10.	"Xiaowangzi Yu Si Yiqianwanci de Mao" (小王子与死一千万次的猫; "The Little Prince and the Cat Who Died Ten Million Times" — ft. Yang Jiasong)	Yang Jiasong	3:55
11.	"Sheng Sheng Man" (声声慢; "Slow, Slow Tune")	Hao Lei	5:09

=== Other songs ===
Song	Lyrics	Music	Notes
"Yangqi" (氧气; "Oxygen")	Liao Yimei	Zhang Guantian	song in Rhinoceros in Love and Summer Palace
"Dang Ai Chengle Wangshi" (当爱成了往事; "When Love Became the Past")	Chen Xi	Dong Dongdong	ending theme of When Love Has Gone
"Ren Yu Zhi Lian" (人鱼之恋; "Love Between a Man and a Fish" — duet with Yu Xiaowei)	Hao Lei	Zhao Weili	theme song of Sister Brides

== Awards and nominations ==
Year	#	Award	Category	Work	Result
2010	47th	Golden Horse Awards	Best Supporting Actress	The Fourth Portrait	Won
2012	49th	Golden Horse Awards	Best Actress	Mystery	Nominated
2013	13th	Chinese Film Media Awards	Best Actress	Mystery	Nominated
2013	4th	China Film Director's Guild Awards	Best Actress	Mystery	Nominated
2013	7th	Asian Film Awards	Best Actress	Mystery	Nominated
2013	4th	Youth Film Handbook Awards	Best Actress	Mystery	Co-winner
2014	51st	Golden Horse Awards	Best Supporting Actress	The Golden Era	Nominated
2015	6th	Youth Film Handbook Awards	Best Actress	The Golden Era	Nominated
2015	34th	Hong Kong Film Awards	Best Supporting Actress	The Golden Era	Nominated
2015	15th	Chinese Film Media Awards	Best Supporting Actress	Dearest	Nominated
2018	24th	Shanghai Television Festival	Best Actress	Full Love of the Courtyard	Nominated
2019	6th	The Actors of China Awards	Best Actress (Sapphire Category)	Full Love of the Courtyard	Nominated
2020	32nd	Flying Apsaras Awards	Outstanding Actress	Full Love of the Courtyard	Nominated
2020	7th	The Actors of China Awards	Best Actress (Sapphire)	—N/a	Nominated
2021	12th	China Film Director's Guild Awards	Best Actress	Spring Tide	Nominated
