= Once Upon a Love =

- Promotional poster
- Also known as: 原來愛·就是甜蜜; Once Upon a Love
- Genre: Romance
- Directed by: Lin Qing Zhen (林清振)
- Starring: Sunny Wang; Cheryl Yang; Matt Wu; Reen Yu
- Opening theme: "擁抱你的微笑" (Embracing Your Smile) by Claire Kuo
- Ending theme: "看見" (See) by Wang Hong En
- Country of origin: Taiwan
- Original language: Mandarin
- No. of episodes: 15

Production
- Production location: Taiwan
- Running time: 90 minutes
- Production company: GTV

Original release
- Network: FTV, GTV
- Release: 8 July – 7 October 2012

Related
- Absolute Darling; The Queen of SOP

Once Upon a Love
- Traditional Chinese: 原來愛·就是甜蜜
Transcriptions

Once Upon a Love (Chinese: 原來愛·就是甜蜜) is a Taiwanese idol romance drama television series written by Yang Yi Xun、Jing Ru and Hui Fen and is directed by Lin Qing Zhen. It stars Sunny Wang, Matt Wu, Cheryl Yang and Reen Yu. The show was aired on GTV on 8 July 2012.

== Synopsis ==
A decade ago when Li Jin Yang/John Lee (Sunny Wang) was still a high school student, because of what Tian Ru Mi (Cheryl Yang) said - who was then the crowned "Rose Princess", inspired him to become a fashion designer. Ten years later, Li Jin Yang finally became a fashion designer in the United States and after being awarded a prestigious award known as the "Best Women's Outfit Designer" award, both his career and love life was perfect. However, things did not turn out as good for Ru Mi who once won the "Rose Princess Pageant" is now a tour guide and also a single mother with an eleven-year-old son. After being forced to move out of her house in Taipei and the closure of the travel agency she was working for, Ru Mi lost both her source of income and house, not knowing when her next meal will be.

After receiving a phone call, Jin Yang was informed that his grandmother (Mei Fang) was sick and wanted to bring his girlfriend Rebecca (Katherine Wang) back to Taiwan with him to meet his family. However, Rebecca refused and in the end Li Jin Yang had no choice but to leave for Taiwan by himself. Under the encouragement of her friend and her future colleague, Gu Li (Ying Wei Min), Ru Mi returned to her hometown-Zhang Hua and started a small travel agency business with a small bus known as "Sweet Bus". After Jin Yang unknowingly helped Ru Mi to complete a new design template for the bus's exterior that was drawn by her son, Tian Yi Xiang, Jin Yang and Ru Mi meet again after ten years.

When Jin Yang found out that his grandmother had pretended to be ill to trick him into returning to Taiwan, he was furious and wanted to return to the United States. However, Jin Yang was unable to go against his grandmother's words, he had no choice but to accept his grandmother's request to go on a blind date with a rich daughter of the local winery owner. However, Jin Yang is starting to fall in love with Ru Mi again and Ru Mi, who believes that she would one day find Yi Xiang's father again, gets disappointed again and again starts to open her heart to Jin Yang. Jin Yang then becomes Yi Xiang's godfather after knowing that Yi Xiang longs to have a father because he never met his own father before. However, when Yi Xiang's father, Xu Ye, appears at the same time, who will Ru Mi choose, Xu Ye or Jin Yang?

== Cast ==
=== Main cast ===
Actor	Role	Details
Sunny Wang	Li Jin Yang /John Lee	A fashion designer who just came back from the United States
Cheryl Yang	Tian Ru Mi	The owner of a small travel agency and also a single mother with an eleven-year-old son
Matt Wu	Xu Ye	Ru Mi's ex-boyfriend and also Yi Xiang's father.
Reen Yu	Xu Juan Juan	Xu Ye's sister, the rich daughter whom was Jin Yang's blind date partner.

=== Supporting cast ===
Actor	Role	Details
Ma Nien-hsien	Chen Yao Ming (	A reporter and also Jin Yang's best friend.
Juan Juan	Tian Yi Xiang	Son of Xu Ye and Tian Ru Mi
Gail Lin	Tian Ru Zi	Ru Mi's older sister
Mei Fang	Bao Yu	Jin Yang's grandmother
Ying Wei-min	Gu Li	Ru Mi's colleague and friend, he is also the driver of "Sweet Bus"
Lu Man Yin	Ah Feng	Jin Yang's mother
Chen Wen Pin	Li Xiao Rong	Jin Yang's father
Ivy Fan	Li Rou Yun	Jin Yang's older sister
Zhu De Gang	Xu Yi Chun	Xu Ye and Xu Juan Juan's father, also the owner of the local winery
Ke Shu Qin	Mrs Xu	wife of Xu Yi Chun and also Xu Ye and Xu Juan Juan's mother
Katherine Wang	Rebecca	Jin Yang's girlfriend when he was in the United States
Bonnie Yu	Nicole	Xu Ye's fiancé
Yankee Yang	Wei Li	Owner of a noodle stall that Ru Mi goes frequently, he also has a crush on Ru Mi

=== Cameo ===
Actor	Role	Details
Xiao Bing	Event host	Event host for the "Rose Princess Pageant"
Lin Mei-hsiu	Mrs Tian	Ru Mi's mother
Jasper Liu	Tian Yi Xiang	Older version of Yi Xiang (Appeared in episode 14)
Chen Wei Min	Chen Ba	Yao Ming's father

== Soundtrack ==
=== Opening Theme ===
- "擁抱你的微笑" (Embracing Your Smile)

Performed by Claire Kuo
Lyrics: Wang Ya Jun (王雅君)
Composer: Ji Jia Song (紀佳松)

=== Ending Theme ===
- "看見" (See)

Performed by Wang Hong En (王宏恩)
Lyrics: Wang Hong En (王宏恩)
Composer: Wang Hong En (王宏恩)

=== Insert songs ===
- "再見面的時候" (Moment We Meet Again)

Performed by Huang Ya Li (黄雅莉)
Lyrics: Yao Ruo Long (姚若龍)
Composer: Chen Xiao Xia (陳小霞)

- "打勾勾" (Pinky Promise)

Performed by Chen Hui Yi (陳暉宜)
Lyrics: Tian Yue (天樂)
Composer: Chen Hui Yi (陳暉宜)

- "幸福說" (Happiness Said)

Performed by Shirley (戴蕙心)
Lyrics: Chen Xue Sheng (陳學聖)
Composer: Shirley (戴蕙心)

- "Miss you"

Performed by Shirley (戴蕙心)
Lyrics: Shirley (戴蕙心)
Composer: Shirley (戴蕙心)

- "星星" (Stars)

Performed by Jingwen (曾靜玟)
Lyrics: Wang Ya Jun (王雅君)
Composer: Wang Ya Jun (王雅君)

== Broadcast ==
Country/Region	Channel	Timeslot	Episode premiere	Episode finale	Avg rating
Taiwan	FTV	Sunday 22:00	July 8, 2012	October 7, 2012	1.02
Taiwan	GTV	Saturday 21:00	July 14, 2012	October 13, 2012	-
Singapore	Channel U	Sunday 21:30	July 8, 2012	October 8, 2012	-
Hong Kong	TVB J2	Sunday 20:30	August 26, 2012	-	-

== Reception ==
Broadcast Date	Episode	AGB ratings	Ranking	Total ratings	Notes
8 July 2012	1	1.15	2	0.51	
15 July 2012	2	0.67	3		
22 July 2012	3	1.29	2	0.65	
29 July 2012	4	1.37	1	-	
5 August 2012	5	1.27	2	-	Aired from 21:00 to 22:00 only
12 August 2012	6	1.15	2	-	Aired from 21:00 to 22:00 only
19 August 2012	7	0.95	2		
26 August 2012	8	1.09	2		
2 September 2012	9	0.82	2	0.46	
9 September 2012	10	1.03	2	0.48	
16 September 2012	11	0.95	2	0.40	
23 September 2012	12	0.89	2	0.29	
30 September 2012	13	0.88	2	0.41	
7 October 2012	14	0.76	2	0.32	
Average		1.02	-	0.44	-
