= Lady Maid Maid =

- Promo poster
- 愛情女僕
- Genre: Romance, Idol series
- Written by: Du Xin Yi 杜欣怡; Wang Yu Qi 王玉琪; Chen Tai Lin 陳泰霖
- Directed by: Yu Zhong Zhong 于中中; Jiang Kai Chen 蔣凱宸; Zheng De Hua 鄭德華
- Starring: Nicholas Teo; Reen Yu; Janel Tsai; Danny Liang; Katherine Wang
- Opening theme: Feel Guilty (感覺犯) by Magic Power (MP魔幻力量)
- Ending theme: The Heart Of A Child (心裡的孩子) by Rachel Liang (梁文音)
- Country of origin: Republic of China (Taiwan)
- Original language: Mandarin
- No. of series: 1
- No. of episodes: 67

Production
- Producers: Liang Han Hui 梁漢輝; Xu Zhi Yi 徐志怡; Lin Yan Shen 林延申
- Production location: Taiwan
- Running time: 60 minutes
- Production company: Eastern Shine Production Co. Ltd

Original release
- Network: SETTV
- Release: 27 November 2012 – 25 March 2013

Related
- Sweet Sweet Bodyguard; Two Fathers

Lady Maid Maid (traditional Chinese: 愛情女僕; simplified Chinese: 爱情女仆; pinyin: Ài Qíng Nǚ Pū) is a Taiwanese idol romance drama television series created and developed by SETTV. It stars Nicholas Teo, Reen Yu, Janel Tsai, Danny Liang and Katherine Wang as the main cast for the drama series. This 67-episode drama debuted on 27 November 2012, replacing Sweet Sweet Bodyguard's time slot on SETTV's 8PM Drama line up. The drama started filming on 25 October 2012.

== Synopsis ==
When Liu Shu Qi was a child, her father died leaving her family in destitute. Gao Xiao Jie generously helped her family get back to their feet. To repay his kindness, she did everything and anything for him, such as waking him up in the morning, covering for him when he went off womanizing instead of working, or apologizing to people he pissed off. There is a laundry list of things she does for love and in the hope of one day marrying him. But their relationship takes a drastic turn when a little girl showed up identifying herself as Gao Xiao Jie's never-before-known daughter.

== Cast ==
=== Main cast ===
Actor	Role	Details
Nicholas Teo	Gao Xiao-jie (高孝介)	
Reen Yu	Liu Shu-qi (劉舒琪)	
Janel Tsai	Hányǐngzhī (韓穎芝)	
Danny Liang	Xiàng lěi(向磊)	
Katherine Wang	Wei Jia-hui (魏佳慧)	

=== Supporting cast ===
- Aiko Lan Ai Zi (藍愛子) as Qiu Qiu 球球
- Ba Yu as Wu Guan Ling 吳冠玲
- Lin Bo Hong as Liu Shu Yu 劉舒宇
- Wu Jia Shan (吳佳珊) as Liu Zhang Ru Fang 劉張如芳
- Chang Qing (長青) as Xiang Qiu Tian 向秋田
- Yang Li-yin as Xiang Wu Chun Yu 向吳春雨
- Kao Ying Hsuan as Ou Bao Luo 歐保羅
- Lu Yi Long (陸一龍) as Gao Zhong Yue 高仲岳
- Chocolate Lai as Xiao Zheng 小鄭
- Du Si Mei (杜詩梅) as Zhu Zhu Li 朱珠莉
- Judy Ongg as Xiao Jie's mother
- Luo Bei An as Wei Su Hua 魏甦華
- Ma Li Ou (馬利歐) as Gan Di 甘地
- Xie Qi Wen (謝其文) as Li Li 力力
- Kelly Pai as Ou Bao Luo's girlfriend (ep1)
- Akio Chen as Han's father
- Duncan Chow as Luo Jia Liang 羅家良
- Pink Yang as Hao Qiang 郝薔

== Soundtrack ==
=== Opening theme ===
Magic Power (MP魔幻力量) - 感覺犯 (Magic Power - gǎn jué fàn)

=== Ending theme ===
梁文音 - 心裡的孩子 (Rachel Liang - xīn lǐ de hái zi)

=== Insert songs ===
Dawen 王大文 - 回心轉意 (Dawen - hui xin zhuan yi)

Rachel Liang 梁文音 - 黃色夾克 (Rachel Liang - huang se jia ke (Yellow Jacket))

Rachel Liang 梁文音 - 月光地毯 (Rachel Liang - yue guang di tan (Moonlight Carpet))

Magic Power MP魔幻力量 - 等等我 (Magic Power - deng deng wo)

Jia jia 紀家盈(家家) - 淚滴 (Jia jia - lei di (Teardrop))

Jia jia 紀家盈(家家) - 改變 (Jia jia - gai bian (Change)

== Broadcast ==
Country/Region	Channel	Timeslot	Episode premiere	Episode finale	Avg rating
Taiwan	SETTV	Mondays to Thursdays 20:00	27 November 2012	25 March 2013	-
Taiwan	ETTV	Mondays to Thursdays 22:00	27 November 2012	25 March 2013	-
Singapore	StarHub TV E City	Mondays to Fridays 19:00	11 March 2013	11 June 2013	
