= Sunny Wang =

Taiwanese-American actor and model

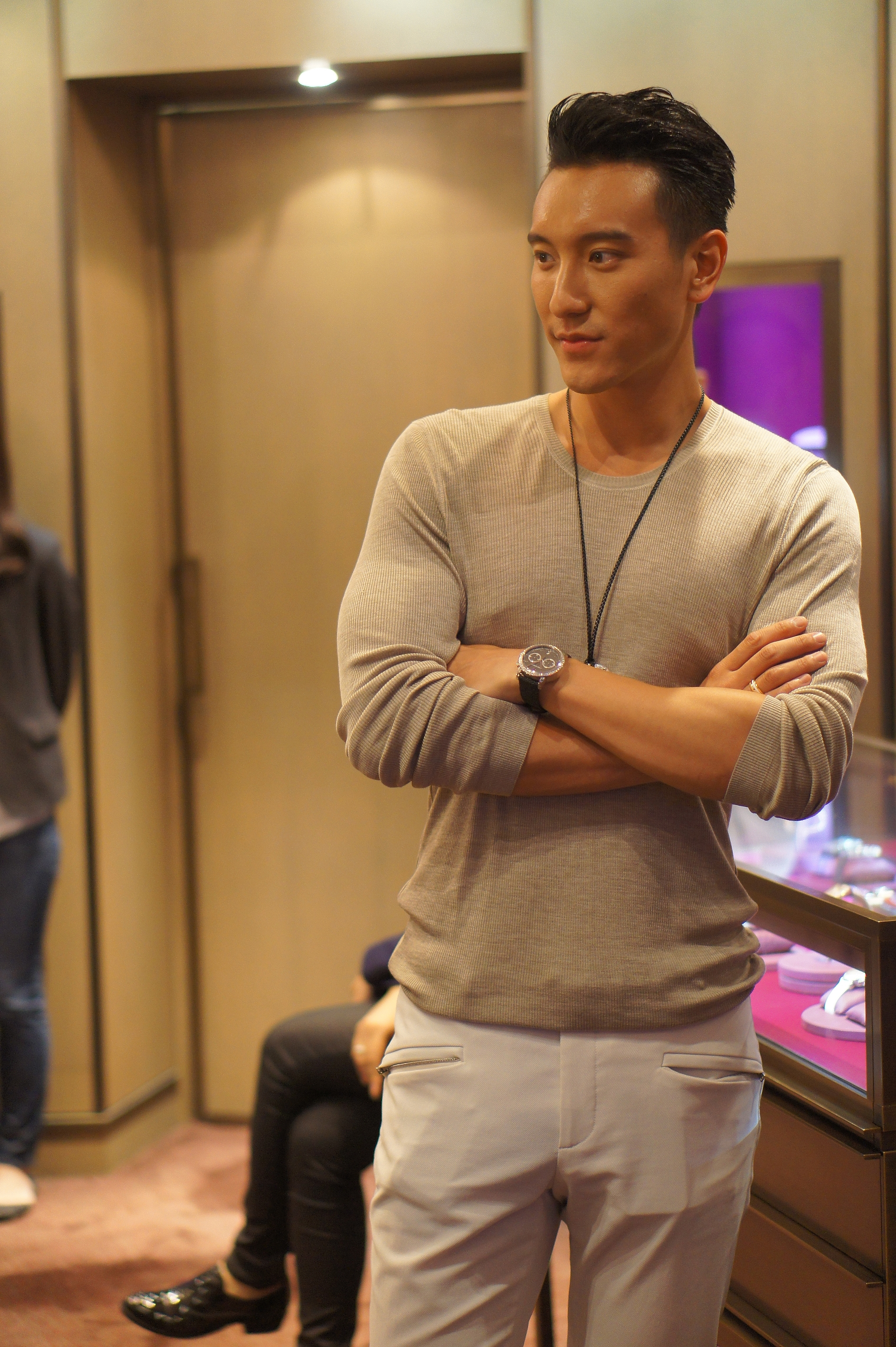
- Born: November 2, 1982 (age 43); New York, New York, United States
- Education: New York University
- Occupations: Actor, model
- Years active: 2011-present
- Agent: Universes Entertainment Marketing
- Spouse: Dominique Choy (m. 2015)
- Musical career
- Also known as: Wang Yangming

Sunny Wang (simplified Chinese: 王阳明; traditional Chinese: 王陽明; pinyin: Wáng Yáng Míng; Pe̍h-ōe-jī: Ông Iông-bêng) is a Taiwanese-American actor and model.

== Early life ==
Wang was born on November 2, 1982, in New York, New York, United States of Taiwanese origin. He moved to Taiwan shortly after birth and did not return to the States until he was seven. He grew up in the States with his grandma, mother and younger sister Yvonne, who is 3.5 years younger. He attended New York University, majoring in business and minoring in film studies. Wang is fluent in both English and Mandarin Chinese.

Wang had loved to perform since young, but his family wanted him to complete his studies and also to work in the family business. After several years of working for his uncle in a shipping company, traveling around Asia, he eventually decided to pursue his dream and entered the entertainment industry.

== Career ==
Prior to his debut, Wang had already gained recognition as an ex-boyfriend of singer Elva Hsiao. With the help of Hsiao and Sylvia Chang, whose son, Oscar Wang, is a sworn brother, he entered the entertainment industry in 2010, initially as a model. In the same year, he founded the streetwear and accessories brand Imperial Taels (金銀帝國) with partners Ryan Yeh and designer Chuck Lee. In 2011, Wang made his acting debut with a breakout role as the second male lead in the hit show In Time with You. In 2012, Wang starred in Once Upon a Love, co-starring Cheryl Yang.

== Personal life ==
Wang met Elva Hsiao in 2003 during his university winter holiday return to Taiwan. Their relationship ended in March, 2005. They got together again 8 months later but broke up again. The two currently are under the same agency and manager.

Wang announced his relationship with Australian-Taiwanese singer songwriter Dominique Choy in early 2015. They met in 2005 and began a relationship in 2007, but it did not progress further due to the long distance. They rekindled their romance again in late 2014, and got engaged in April 2015. On December 27, 2015, Wang married Choy in Sydney, Australia.

== Filmography ==
=== Television ===
| Year | English title | Original title | Role | Notes |
|---|---|---|---|---|
| 2011 | In Time with You | 我可能不會愛你 | Ding Liwei | |
| 2012 | Once Upon a Love | 原來愛·就是甜蜜 | John Lee Jinyang | |
| 2013 | Dragon Gate | 飛越龍門客棧 | Zhou Huai An | |
| 2014 | You Light Up My Star | 你照亮我星球 | Ding Yubin | |
| 2014 | Mr. Right Wanted | 徵婚啟事 | Xiao Ma | Cameo |
| 2017 | The Starry Night, The Starry Sea | 那片星空那片海 1 & 2 | An Zuo / Lu Xiao | |
| 2018 | Secret of the Three Kingdoms | 唐人三國機密 | Guo Jia | |
| 2018 | Shadow of Justice aka Eclipse | 蝕日風暴 | 樊 毅 | |
| 2019 | Rebirth of Shopping Addict | 我不是购物狂 | Yan Li | |
| 2019 | No Secrets | 没有秘密的你 | | |

=== Film ===
| Year | English title | Original title | Role | Notes |
|---|---|---|---|---|
| 2012 | 100% Kiss | | | |
| 2015 | Gatao | 角頭 | Michael | |
| 2016 | Lost in the Pacific | 蒸發太平洋 | | |
| 2017 | My Other Home | 纽约人在北京 | | |
| 2017 | Pigeon Tango | 盜命師 | Malacca | |
| 2020 | Wild Grass | 蕎麥瘋長 | | |
| 2020 | Abyssal Spider | 海霧 | | |
| 2024 | GATAO: Like Father Like Son | 角頭—大橋頭 | Michael | |
| 2025 | GATAO: Big Brothers | 角頭—鬥陣欸 | Michael | |

=== Music videos ===
| Year | Artist | Song title |
|---|---|---|
| 2011 | Valen Hsu | "Parisberries" |
| 2011 | Rainie Yang | "Imperfect Love" |
| 2018 | Dizzy Dizzo | Copthorne Kings |
| 2020 | Nine One One | Love You Til The End |

== Controversies ==
In 2024, Sunny Wang drew public criticism after referring to a fan-requested heart gesture as a "sissy" (娘炮) action on social media while promoting a film. The remark was widely condemned as discriminatory, leading some influencers to call for a boycott of brands he represented, including Verve. Wang later apologized publicly, acknowledging his wording as inappropriate and expressing a commitment to being more thoughtful in the future.
