= One Night Only (2016 film) =

- Poster
- Chinese: 天亮之前
- Directed by: Matt Wu
- Starring: Aaron Kwok; Yang Zishan; Hao Lei; Andy On; Jack Kao
- Production companies: Heng Ye Film Distribution; Acutance Pictures Corp. of China; Century Great Dragon; Beijing Wanmei Xingkong Media; Wuxi Strange World Culture; Shenzhen Shanwei Pictures; Zhejiang Haoyu Hudong Media; China Guojing (Beijing) Media; Hongkong Hengye Film Distribution; Guangying Culture Media; Muke Entertainment
- Distributed by: Heng Ye Film Distribution (China)
- Release date: 22 July 2016 (China)
- Countries: China; Taiwan
- Language: Mandarin
- Box office: CN¥14.3 million

One Night Only is a 2016 Chinese-Taiwanese crime romantic drama film directed by Matt Wu. This is Wu's feature film directorial debut, and stars Aaron Kwok, Yang Zishan (Wu's wife), Hao Lei, Andy On and Jack Kao. It was released in China by Heng Ye Film Distribution on July 22, 2016.

== Plot ==
Having lost all his fortune and loved ones from gambling, Gao Ye walks out from prison to an even more cruel world. Intrigued by a beautiful hooker who approaches him for unknown reasons, he comes up with a master plan to redeem everything he once had. But things immediately spin wildly out of control as they find themselves fallen into a bigger scheme set up by the underground. Will they survive this one night to see another sunrise?

== Cast ==
- Aaron Kwok
- Yang Zishan
- Hao Lei
- Andy On
- Jack Kao
- Zhou Yutong
- Li Haofei
- Jessie Li
- Fan Tiantian

== Reception ==
The film has grossed CN¥14.3 million in China.
