= The Great Hypnotist =

- Theatrical poster
- Traditional Chinese: 催眠大師
- Simplified Chinese: 催眠大师
- Hanyu Pinyin: Cuīmián Dàshī
- Directed by: Leste Chen
- Written by: Endrix Ren; Leste Chen
- Produced by: Tina Shi; James Li; Xu Zheng
- Starring: Xu Zheng; Karen Mok
- Cinematography: Charlie Lam
- Edited by: Yang Hongyu
- Music by: Rare Yu
- Production companies: Wanda Media; Beijing Golden Cicada Film
- Release date: 29 April 2014
- Running time: 102 minutes
- Country: China
- Language: Mandarin
- Box office: US$45.6 million (international)

The Great Hypnotist is a 2014 Chinese mystery-thriller film directed by Leste Chen and starring Xu Zheng and Karen Mok. The film was released on April 29, 2014.

== Plot ==
Dr. Ruining Xu is a prominent psychiatrist who uses hypnotherapy to treat his patients. His mentor, Professor Fang recommends a patient, Xiaoyan Ren who claims she can see ghosts. Ruining agrees to treat Xiaoyan, despite learning from his colleague who once treated her that there is something disturbing about her.

During his session with Xiaoyan, Ruining quickly learns that she is lying to him. By contacting a friend who works at child services, Ruining learns that Xiaoyan was actually abandoned by her adoptive parents after her adoptive mother became pregnant. She was then taken in by a foster family. However, Ruining realizes she is not actually lying, but had suppressed her darkest memories by making stories up.

A game of cat and mouse continues where Ruining tries to disproves Xiaoyan's made up stories by the proof he obtains. However things change when Xiaoyan tells Ruining that she has been seeing two people, a man and a woman, in his chambers since she arrived. After sometime Ruining opens up about the car crash into a river which he was driving and resulted in death of his lover and best friend. Xiaoyan tells him that ghosts have forgiven him and want him to remember their forgiveness as he wakes up. Ruining crashes on the floor as his assistant runs to take care of him.

It is revealed that Xiaoyan Ren was really "The Great Hypnotist", and was working with Professor Fang, Ruining's family and his staff to cure Ruining of post traumatic guilt over which Ruining had tried to commit suicide. Professor Fang had carefully crafted this plan selecting her best student Xiaoyan Ren who was also Ruining's classmate. After Ruining is awake everyone except Xiaoyan Ren goes to see him and in flashback it is revealed, Ruining's best friend who was also killed in car accident, was Xiaoyan's fiancé. Professor Fang tells Xiaoyan that she must also let it go.

Xiaoyan and Ruining have a moment together where Xiaoyan confesses that she does not want to be cured.

== Cast ==
- Xu Zheng as Xu Ruining
- Karen Mok as Ren Xiaoyan
- Hu Jing
- Lü Zhong
- Wang Yaoqing

== Reception ==
The film reached US$44,070,000 at the Chinese box office. It earned a total of US$45.6 million internationally.

== Awards and nominations ==
Awards	Category	Name	Result
Chinese Film Media Awards 2015	Most Anticipated Film		Nominated
Chinese Film Media Awards 2015	Best Screenwriter	Leste Chen、Peng Ren	Nominated
22nd Beijing College Student Film Festival	Best Screenplay	Leste Chen、Peng Ren	Won
HAMILTON BEHIND THE CAREMA AWARDS	Best Screenplay	Leste Chen、Peng Ren	Nominated
HAMILTON BEHIND THE CAREMA AWARDS	Best Sound	Jiang Yang、Nan Zhao	Won
30th Golden Rooster Awards	Best Sound Recording	Jiang Yang、Nan Zhao	Nominated
30th Golden Rooster Awards	Best Art Direction	Luo Shunfu	Nominated
