= Leste Chen =

Taiwanese film director

- Born: 3 March 1981 (age 45); Taiwan
- Occupation: Filmmaker
- Years active: 2004–present

Leste Chen (Chinese: 陳正道; pinyin: Chén Zhèngdào; born 3 March 1981) is a Taiwanese filmmaker.

His most recent feature is Upcoming Summer (2021), directed by Leste Chen, written by Zhan Chen, produced by Tang XiRu, First Cuts Features.

== Filmography ==
- The Heirloom (2005)
- Eternal Summer (2006)
- Love on Credit (2011)
- HeartBeat Love (2012)
- The Great Hypnotist (2014)
- 20 Once Again (2015)
- Upcoming Summer (2021)
- Battle of Memories (2017)
- Moonshine and Valentine (2018)
- The Resurrected (2025)

== Accolades ==
Jury

- 2021 – 11th Beijing International Film Festival
