= Ye Qing =

Chinese actress (born 1988)

- 叶青
- Born: November 13, 1988 (age 37); Yakeshi, Inner Mongolia, China
- Education: Beijing Film Academy
- Occupation: Actress
- Years active: 2009–present
- Agent: China Film Group Corporation

Chinese name
- Traditional Chinese: 葉青
- Simplified Chinese: 叶青
Transcriptions
Standard Mandarin
- Hanyu Pinyin: Yè Qīng

Ye Qing (Chinese: 叶青; born 13 November 1988) is a Chinese actress. She rose to fame after portraying Yu Tan in the television series historical television series Scarlet Heart (2011), which enjoyed the highest ratings in mainland China. Her film breakthrough came in 2014 with her performance as Zhang Yan in the wuxia film Brotherhood of Blades, for which she won the Best Newcomer at the Chinese Australia International Film Festival and was nominated for the Best Newcomer at the 22nd Beijing College Student Film Festival.

== Early life and education ==
Ye was born on November 13, 1988, in Yakeshi, Inner Mongolia, China. She graduated from Beijing Film Academy.

== Acting career ==
Ye Qing's first film role was an undergraduate of Jiangsu University in the biographical film Love Angel (2009). Following this, she appeared in numerous roles in other films, including One Wrong Step (2011), Love on that Day (2011), and My Family (2013).

She gained fame for her supporting role as Yu Tan in the historical television series Scarlet Heart (2011), adapted from Tong Hua's novel of the same title.

In 2012, she had a key supporting role in Xuan-Yuan Sword: Scar of Sky, a fantasy wuxia drama. That same year, she also appeared in other television series, including anthology romance drama Refresh 3+7 and romance series Conspiracy of Love.

Ye was cast as the female lead in the wuxia film Man of Tai Chi (2013), She then co-starred in the action film Urban Games.

In 2014, she played a supporting role in Scarlet Heart 2, the modern sequel to Scarlet Heart. She also starred in the wuxia film Brotherhood of Blades. She was nominated for the Best Newcomer at the 22nd Beijing College Student Film Festival and won the Best Newcomer at the China Australia International Film Festival.

Ye had a supporting role in romance drama Woman on the Breadfruit Tree (2015).

In 2016, Ye co-starred in fantasy wuxia drama Chinese Paladin 5. She then appeared in historical series Princess Jieyou as Feng Liao, a politician and diplomat in the Western Han dynasty. That same year, she featured in romance comedy film My Best Friend's Wedding, and Oxide Pang's war film My War.

Ye appeared in the romantic television series Love & Life & Lie (2017). She made a guest appearance on Midnight Diner. Ye joined the main cast of The Starry Night, the Starry Sea II as Ming Zhu, a blind girl of the owner of the teahouse. She then featured in romance drama Across the Ocean to See You.

In 2018, Ye starred in the suspense web drama Romantic Detective.

In 2019, Ye starred in the crime drama Your Secret, and historical mystery drama Under The Power.

== Filmography ==
=== Film ===
Year	English title	Chinese title	Role	Notes
2009	Love Angel	小城大爱	Ding Yulan	
2011	One Wrong Step	无底洞	Gu Xiaoyu	
2011	Love on that Day	爱在那一天	Xiao Ya	
2013	My Family	合影	Yu Xiaoshuang	
2013	Man of Tai Chi	太极侠	Qing Xia	
2013	Deep Love	狠爱你	Xiao Chen	
2013	Urban Games	城市游戏	Zhang Xiaozhuo	
2014	Brotherhood of Blades	绣春刀	Zhang Yan	
2015	Mr. Six	老炮儿		
2016	My Best Friend's Wedding	我最好朋友的婚礼	Ma Li	
2016	My War	我的战争	Wang Wenjun	
2017		缞神契约	A girl	
2018	Perfect-Lover.com	来自你的瓦伦汀		
2020	Back to the Wharf	风平浪静	Jiang Fan	

=== Television series ===
Year	English title	Chinese title	Role	Notes
2011	Scarlet Heart	步步惊心	Yu Tan	
2012	Xuan-Yuan Sword: Scar of Sky	轩辕剑之天之痕	Ru Yan	
2012	Refresh 3+7	刷新3+7	Xiao Mei	
2012	Conspiracy of Love	真爱背后	Ye Zhifan	
2014	Scarlet Heart 2	步步惊情	Meng Xinyi	
2015	Woman on the Breadfruit Tree	长在面包树上的女人	Ge Mi'er	
2016	Princess Jieyou	解忧公主	Feng Liao	
2016	Chinese Paladin 5	仙剑云之凡	Yu Shang	
2017	Love & Life & Lie	遇见爱情的利先生	Ji Zhizhen	
2017	Across the Ocean to See You	漂洋过海来看你	Tang Guoguo	
2017	Midnight Diner	深夜食堂	Mingming	
2017	The Starry Night, The Starry Sea II	那片星空那片海2	Ming Zhu	
2018	Beauties in the Closet	恰逢姐妹花正开	Beauty Fang Cao	Cameo
2018	Romantic Detective	暧昧侦探	Chen Xi	
2019	Your Secret	我知道你的秘密	Gu Chu	
2019	Under The Power	锦衣之下	Shangguan Xi	
2020	Wu Xin: The Monster Killer III	无心法师III	Xue Niang	
2020	If There Is No Tomorrow	我是余欢水		
2021	To Be With You	约定	Su Ting {Nian Ye Fan}	
2021	Novoland: Pearl Eclipse	斛珠夫人	Zhu Linglang	
2022	Immortal Samsara	沉香如屑	Ying Deng	
2023	Rising With the Wind	我要逆风去	Song Zhi	
Incomparable Beauty	无与伦比的美丽	Su Yi		
2025	Justifiable Defense	正当防卫	Jiang Ting	
2026	The Lament of Autumn	玉簟秋	Yu Jinxuan	
TBA	Lie Jin Feng Bao	烈金风暴		

== Awards ==
Year	Award	Category	Work	Result	Notes
2015	China Australia International Film Festival	Best Newcomer	Brotherhood of Blades	Won	
2015	22nd Beijing College Student Film Festival	Best Newcomer	Brotherhood of Blades	Nominated	
2025	16th Macao International Television Festival; Golden Lotus Awards	Best Supporting Actress	Justifiable Defense	Nominated	
