= Legend of a Rabbit =

- Film poster
- Directed by: Sun Yijun
- Screenplay by: Zou Jingzhi; Zou Han
- Produced by: Dong Fachang; Xue Jiajing; Jiang Ping; Zhou Chao; FDL
- Starring: Chinese Dub: Fan Wei; Yan Ni; Zhang Fengyi; Zhang Yishan; Pu Cunxin; English Dub: Jon Heder; Tom Arnold; Rebecca Black; Michael Clarke Duncan; Claire Geare
- Music by: Peter Kam
- Distributed by: CDF Pictures/PHX ENT. GROUP (EU)
- Release date: 11 July 2011 (China)
- Running time: 89 minutes
- Country: China
- Languages: English; Mandarin
- Budget: CNY120 million
- Box office: CNY16.2 million

Legend of a Rabbit (Chinese: 兔侠传奇 Tùxiá Chuánqí), released in the United States as Legend of Kung Fu Rabbit, is a 2011 Chinese animated film directed by Sun Yijun. The film features an original cast of Fan Wei, Yan Ni, Zhang Fengyi, Zhang Yishan and Pu Cunxin. In the English version, it stars the voices of Jon Heder, Tom Arnold, Rebecca Black, Michael Clarke Duncan and Claire Geare.

The film was released in 62 countries, and was the first Chinese animated feature ever to be shown internationally. The film was a box office failure in China, managing to gross CNY16.2 million compared to its CNY120 million budget but it was a success in many other countries. Some noted its similarity to the Kung Fu Panda film franchise (Duncan voiced Commander Vachir in the first Kung Fu Panda film).

A sequel to the film, Legend of a Rabbit: The Martial of Fire, was released in 2015.

== Plot ==
A rabbit named Fu has an occupation of cooking pancakes in Beijing. He is guided by kung fu master named Shifu, so he can defeat the master's enemy, Slash. Fu, surprised at finding he can channel Kung fu, confronts Slash; both defeating him and saving Penny.

== Cast ==
Character	Mandarin voice actor	English voice actor
Tu Er / Fu, the rabbit	Fan Wei	Jon Heder
Mudan / Peony / Penny, the tuxedo cat	Yan Ni	Rebecca Black
Laoguanzhu / Shifu, the old capuchin monkey	Pu Cunxin	Tom Arnold
Xiong Tianba / Slash, the polar bear	Zhang Fengyi	Michael Clarke Duncan
Gao Liangmi / Biggie, the rabbit	Zhang Yishan	Claire Geare
Gou Zi/Doggie, the chihuahua	Feng Yuanzheng	
Zhu Dachu, the pig chef	Huang Hong	
Liaoya / Mr. Tooth, the groundhog	Lin Yongjian	
Crocodile bandit	Xu Zheng	
Toad bandit	Yang Andy	Nathan Barnatt

== Production and release ==
Legend of a Rabbit was directed by Sun Yijun, president of animation at Beijing Film Academy. It was made over the course of three years, with a crew of 500 animators. The film was produced on a budget of CNY120 million, with 80% of it used for production equipment, while the rest was used for marketing. Yijun said that he was not completely satisfied with the film, but it would still get attention to the Chinese animation industry. He also said:

What made me proud is that The Guardian had an article that was titled '"China Picks Cartoon Fight with Hollywood". It means that, as a Chinese, I am competing with the United States. It's just like Liu Xiang competing in the 100 meters – this is definitely a proud thing for Chinese.

Legend of a Rabbit was first presented in December 2010, at a conference held in Beijing. The first teaser was released in February 2011, and a seven-minute preview was later put online in June. The film premiered at the 2011 Cannes Film Festival. It was later shown at 3,000 theaters in China, and was released in more than 80 countries, making it the first Chinese animated film ever to have an international theatrical release. Tianjin North Film Studio signed a deal with Cartoon Network to air the film in Australia, New Zealand, India and Taiwan, and merchandise such as a line of toys were also made.

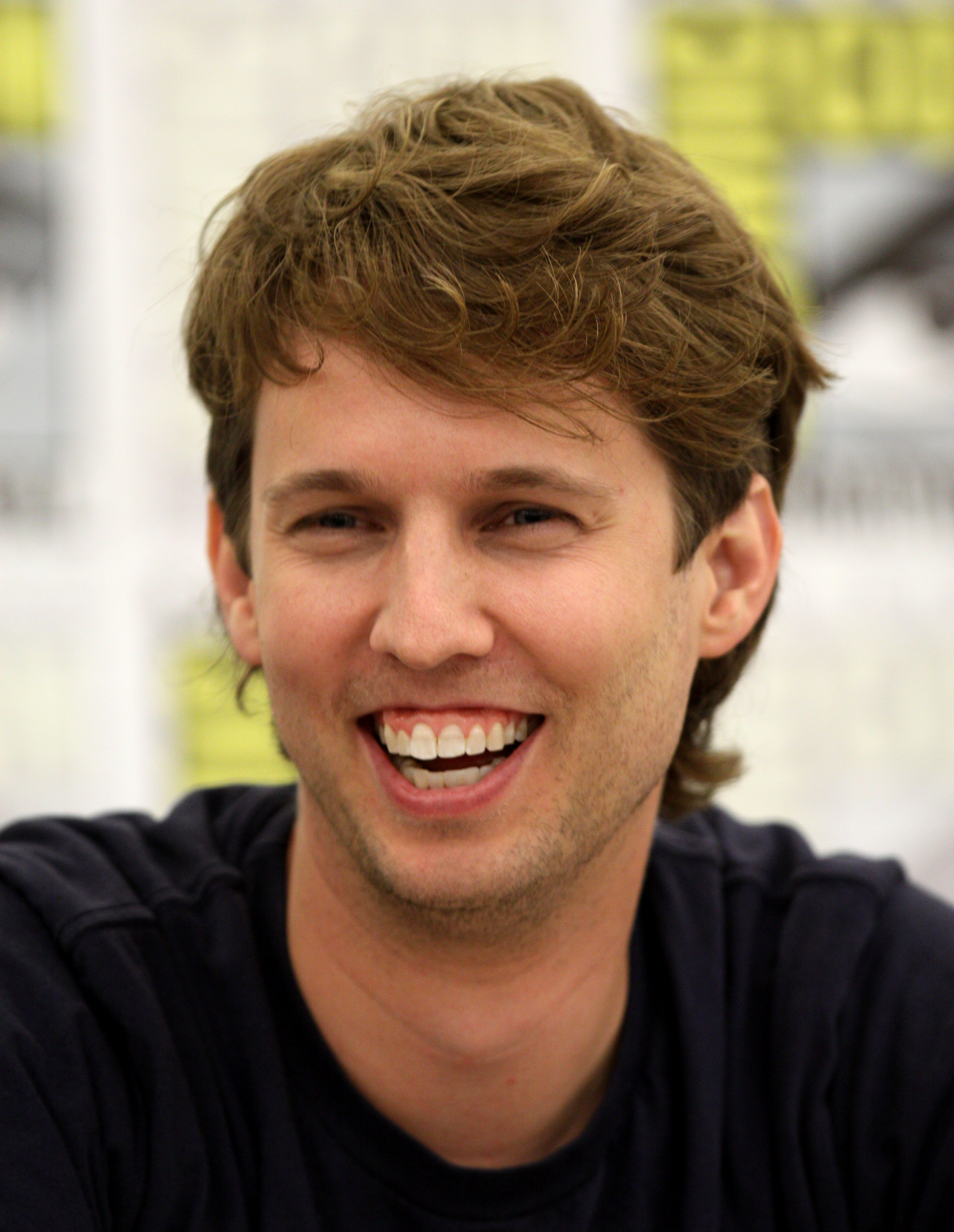
Jon Heder

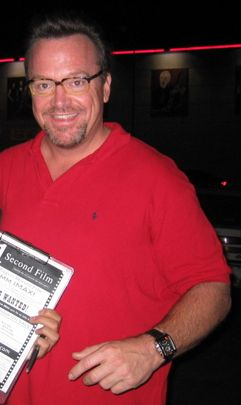
Tom Arnold

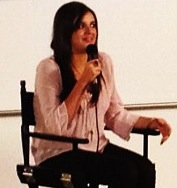
Rebecca Black

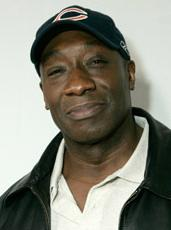
Michael Clarke Duncan

The English version for Legend of a Rabbit stars the cast of Jon Heder, Tom Arnold, Rebecca Black, Michael Clarke Duncan, (all pictured) and Claire Green.

It was announced in 2011 that an English dub of the film was in the works, with Michael Clarke Duncan, Rebecca Black, Claire Geare and Jade Lianna-Peters. Other candidates were Daniel Craig, Robert De Niro, Ralph Fiennes, Hugh Grant, Madonna, Shaquille O'Neal and Michael Tyson. It was the first-ever Chinese picture to have it be dubbed English on its North American release. The DVD of the English dub was released by Lions Gate Entertainment on 24 September 2013.

== Reception ==
Legend of a Rabbit was a commercial flop at the Chinese box office, managing to gross CNY16.2 million against its CNY210 million budget. It had earned over CNY10 million on its first week. The film's director considered that the reason for the very little amount of viewing for cartoon movies was due to the audience's habits. However, in March 2013, it was #6 on Redbox's Family Top 20.

Many have considered the film to be a rip-off of the 2008 American film Kung Fu Panda. Reacting to this, Yijun denied that "Legend of a Rabbit" was even based on the film and said he was confused by the netizens' response.

Response of the film from critics was mixed to negative. The Hollywood Reporter said the film had "potential to be a cheeky finger-up to the Kung Fu Panda franchise", but noted the lack of "eye-popping action, incident or humor to nourish the congee-thin plot," saying that it was "sweet but not enough of a funny bunny." The Sun called it "a commendable effort. It's only fault is that it has to stand up against the technically-slick productions from Hollywood." Japancinema.net graded it a D, calling it an "unoriginal, messy, waste of time, waste of money film that hopefully I can forget as fast as I watched it." Linus Tee, writing for moviexclusive.com, criticized the film's humor and CGI quality, stating it would've been better if it had more-polished technological resources and dialogues. Writing for the magazine Starburst, Andrew Pollard named it "one of those movies that you will regret giving your time to, and it will have you thinking of all the other, better ways you could have spent ninety minutes of your day, such as chewing glass or repainting the house and then watching the walls dry", giving it three out of ten stars. On the positive side, the Dove Foundation awarded the film a score of 3 out of 5, saying that the "characters are memorable and the theme of loyalty is not to be missed in this movie!" However, they warned parents about the amount of violence in the film, suggesting it for kids at the age of 12 years or older.

== Awards ==
Award	Subject	Result	Ref
Huabiao Award	Outstanding Animation	Won	

== Sequel ==
A sequel of the film, Legend of a Rabbit: The Martial of Fire came out in 2015. A sequel was first announced in November 2011. The film was sold to Turkey, Indonesia, Iran and the Middle East in February 2012, and was originally announced to be released under the title Legend of a Rabbit 2: Mysterious City Of Stones. In May 2013, it was stated that Xu Zheng would play the main character, and that the film would premiere at the Cannes Film Festival on 19 May. The sequel was also to be directed by Yijun. Neither were actually involved in the final film. It released on 21 February 2015, with many citing improvements over the first film with the higher quality animation and voice acting.
