= Battle of Memories =

2017 film directed by Leste Chen

- Theatrical release poster
- Chinese: 记忆大师
- Directed by: Leste Chen
- Written by: Ryan Ren; Leste Chen
- Produced by: Tina Shi; Cary Cheng
- Starring: Huang Bo; Xu Jinglei; Duan Yihong; Yang Zishan; Hsu Wei-ning
- Cinematography: Charlie Lam
- Edited by: Yang Hongyu
- Music by: Kubert Leung
- Production companies: Shanwei Film Industry; Wanda Pictures; Le Vision Pictures
- Distributed by: Wanda Pictures
- Release date: April 28, 2017 (China)
- Running time: 119 minutes
- Country: China
- Language: Mandarin
- Budget: US$20 million
- Box office: US$42 million

Battle of Memories is a 2017 Chinese science fiction crime thriller film co-written and directed by Leste Chen and starring Huang Bo, Xu Jinglei, Duan Yihong, Yang Zishan and Hsu Wei-ning. It was released in China on April 28, 2017, and received mixed to positive reviews from critics.

== Plot ==
Jiang Feng, a writer, underwent a procedure to erase some of his memories. At the memory center, there was an incident and he dropped his memory-restore-key card. He delivers divorce papers to his wife, but she refuses to sign the divorce papers until he restores his memories. After his memory restoration procedure, he finds himself in the mind of a serial killer.

Feng goes to police with this information that he can see the murders being committed, but in those memories, he sees himself as murderer. At first, officers Shen Hanqiang and Lei Zi refuse to believe him, but after finding out similarities of his narration of crime scene and actual evidence they start believing his story. Feng realizes that killer has his memories and might try to kill his wife so he stages an escape but fails. At the police station his wife Zhang Daichen meets medical officer Chen Shanshan and befriends her.

While officers wait for Feng's memories to provide a clue towards killer's identity, Lei Zi deduces that killer might be a woman who was best friends with the victim, pointing out that officer Chan might be the killer. Feng flees the prison to save his wife who is with Chan but instead disturbs his wife.

Later it is revealed that office Shen Hanqiang is the actual killer who was using officer Chan to cover up his tracks. Shen kills Chan and as he tries to kill Feng, Daichen comes in between. Shen, having memories of Feng, can not shoot at Daichen. Lei Zi arrives at the scene and arrests Shen. Feng and his wife Daichen reconcile.

== Cast ==
- Bo Huang as Jiang Feng.
- Xu Jinglei as Zhang Daichen, wife of Jiang Feng
- Yihong Duan as Shen Hanqiang, a police detective.
- Yang Zishan as Chen Shanshan, police medical officer.
- Hsu Wei-ning as a mystery woman.

== Production ==
The film has a budget of US$20 million. Principal photography took place in Thailand.

Official main theme of the movie from its soundtrack album, "Battle of Memories", was performed by Kazakh superstar musician (composer and singer) Dimash Qudaibergen.
