= Walking Past the Future =

2017 Chinese drama film

- Film poster
- Directed by: Li Ruijun
- Written by: Li Ruijun
- Produced by: Ellen Eliasoph
- Starring: Yang Zishan; Yi Fang; Naren Hua
- Cinematography: Wang Weihua
- Edited by: Li Ruijun
- Music by: Peyman Yazdanian
- Release dates: 20 May 2017 (Cannes); 17 May 2018 (China)
- Running time: 128 minutes
- Country: China
- Language: Mandarin

Walking Past the Future (Chinese: 路過未來) is a 2017 Chinese drama film directed by Li Ruijun. It was screened in the Un Certain Regard section of the 2017 Cannes Film Festival.

== Synopsis ==
Yang Yaoting's family returns to their village in Gansu after both her parents are laid off from their jobs in Shenzhen but find that life has changed drastically from the one they left 25 years earlier. Yaoting goes back to Shenzhen, and in the hopes of providing her family a home in the city, takes part in high-risk medical tests at a hospital, with tragic consequences.

== Cast ==
- Yang Zishan as Yang Yaoting
- Yi Fang as Xinmin
- Li Qinqin
- Zhou Yunpeng
- Naren Hua
