= Rhinoceros in Love =

Chinese dark romantic play by Liao Yimei

- poster for a 2014 production
- Written by: Liao Yimei
- Characters: Ma Lu; Ming Ming; Heizi; Daxian; Toothbrush; Hong Kong; Lily
- Original language: Chinese (Mandarin)

Premiere
- Date premiered: June 7, 1999
- Place premiered: China National Youth Theatre, Beijing

Rhinoceros in Love is a Chinese play by Liao Yimei, originally directed by her husband Meng Jinghui in 1999, and subsequently performed more than 2,500 times and seen by more than a million people. The play was translated to English by Mark Talacko in 2012. A new English translation by Claire Conceison was commissioned by the BBC in 2014 for a radio play broadcast and was used for the surtitles for the play's US tours in 2017 and 2018.

The play describes the love of a rhinoceros feeder for a beautiful woman. It has been described as a 'classic drama' of modern Chinese theatre. While the play celebrates the protagonists’ resistance against commercialization and pursuit of true love, it also touches a chord with contemporary young Chinese audience in their quest for individual identity. The male protagonist, Ma Lu, in his futile efforts to win over Mingming’s love, incessantly fights against the stereotypical roles society expects him to play—rich, handsome, sophisticated, well-spoken, all cliches in cheap, cheesy soap operas. By adopting role playing within the role, Meng demonstrates the struggles of young Chinese in their search for meanings for their life in contemporary China.

It is a production of the National Theatre Company of China.

In August 2012, it became the first play in the People's Republic of China (1949- ) to reach 1,000 performances.
