= Dearest (2014 film) =

2014 Chinese-Hong Kong film by Peter Chan

- Theatrical release poster

Chinese name
- Traditional Chinese: 親愛的
- Simplified Chinese: 亲爱的
Transcriptions
Yue: Cantonese
- Jyutping: can1 ngoi3 dik1
Southern Min
- Bbánlám Pìngyīm: Tshin Ai E
- Directed by: Peter Chan
- Written by: Zhang Ji
- Produced by: Jojo Hui
- Starring: Zhao Wei; Huang Bo; Tong Dawei; Hao Lei
- Cinematography: Shu Chou; Yang Zhenyu
- Edited by: Derek Hui
- Music by: Leon Ko
- Production companies: We Pictures Limited; China Vision Media Group; Stellar Mega Films; Stellar Mega Pictures; Enlight Pictures; Real Thing Media; HB Studio; PULIN Production Limited
- Distributed by: We Entertainment
- Release dates: 4 September 2014 (TIFF); 26 September 2014 (China); 13 November 2014 (Hong Kong)
- Running time: 130 minutes
- Countries: China; Hong Kong
- Language: Mandarin
- Box office: US$54.6 million

Dearest is a 2014 drama film directed by Peter Chan on kidnapping in China, based on a true story, starring Zhao Wei, Huang Bo, Tong Dawei, and Hao Lei. A Chinese-Hong Kong co-production, it was screened in the Special Presentations section of the 2014 Toronto International Film Festival.

== Plot ==
Following years of unrelenting search, Tian Wenjun (Huang Bo) and ex-wife Lu Xiaojuan (Hao Lei) finally locate their abducted son in a remote village. After the boy is violently taken away from the village, the abductor's widow Li Hongqin (Zhao Wei) — the boy's foster mother — also loses her foster daughter to a state-owned orphanage in Shenzhen. Heartbroken, Li goes on a lone but determined journey to get her daughter back.

== Cast ==
- Zhao Wei as Li Hongqin
- Huang Bo as Tian Wenjun
- Tong Dawei as Gao Xia
- Hao Lei as Lu Xiaojuan
- Zhang Yi as Han Dezhong
- Zhang Guoqiang as Qin Hao
- Zhang Yuqi as Fan Yun
- Zhu Dongxu
- Yi Qing
- Wang Zhifei

== Production ==
Principal photography for Dearest took place in Shenzhen, Guangzhou and Chengde. It began from January 2014 and concluded on 18 April 2014.

Portraying a rural mother, Zhao Wei spoke the Lower Yangtze Mandarin dialect (the predominant dialect in her hometown of Wuhu) rather than Standard Mandarin in the film.

== Soundtrack ==
- "Qin'ai de Xiaohai" (亲爱的小孩; "Dear Child") sung by cast members Huang, Tong, Zhao, Zhang Yi and Hao. It was originally sung by Su Rui as the theme song of the 1985 film The Unwritten Law.
- "Mei Yi Ci" (每一次; "Every Time") sung by Huang. It was originally sung by Zhang Hongsheng as an insert song in the 1990 TV series Kewang.
- "Yinxing de Chibang" (隐形的翅膀; "Invisible Wings") sung by Huang and parents of missing children. It was originally sung by Angela Chang in her 2006 album Pandora.

== Accolades ==
List of awards and nominations
Award	Category	Nominee	Result
58th London Film Festival	Best Film	Dearest	Nominated
51st Golden Horse Awards	Best Actress	Zhao Wei	Nominated
10th Chinese American Film Festival	Best Actress	Zhao Wei	Won
15th Huading Awards	Best Actress	Zhao Wei	Nominated
15th Huading Awards	Best Actor	Huang Bo	Nominated
21st Hong Kong Film Critics Society Awards	Best Picture	Dearest	Nominated
21st Hong Kong Film Critics Society Awards	Best Director	Peter Chan	Nominated
21st Hong Kong Film Critics Society Awards	Best Screenplay	Zhang Ji	Won
21st Hong Kong Film Critics Society Awards	Best Actress	Zhao Wei	Won
34th Hong Kong Film Awards	Best Picture	Dearest	Nominated
34th Hong Kong Film Awards	Best Director	Peter Chan	Nominated
34th Hong Kong Film Awards	Best Screenplay	Zhang Ji	Nominated
34th Hong Kong Film Awards	Best Actor	Huang Bo	Nominated
34th Hong Kong Film Awards	Best Actress	Zhao Wei	Won
4th Chinese Cinephilia Society Awards	Best Actress	Zhao Wei	Won
9th Asian Film Awards	Best Actress	Zhao Wei	Nominated
5th China Youth Film Magazine Poll	Top Ten Pictures	Dearest	Nominated
5th China Youth Film Magazine Poll	Best Actress	Zhao Wei	Nominated
5th China Youth Film Magazine Poll	Best Actress	Hao Lei	Nominated
5th Douban.com Movie Awards	Best Actress	Zhao Wei	Won
5th Douban.com Movie Awards	Best Actress	Hao Lei	Won
6th China Film Director's Guild Awards	Special Jury Prize	Dearest	Won
22nd Beijing College Student Film Festival	Best Picture	Dearest	Won
22nd Beijing College Student Film Festival	Best Actress	Zhao Wei	Won
22nd Beijing College Student Film Festival	Best Screenplay	Zhang Ji	Nominated
11th Guangzhou Student Film Festival	Most Popular Director	Peter Chan	Won
16th Huading Awards	Best Picture	Dearest	Won
16th Huading Awards	Best Director	Peter Chan	Won
16th Huading Awards	Best Screenplay	Zhang Ji	Nominated
16th Huading Awards	Best Actress	Zhao Wei	Won
16th Huading Awards	Best Actor	Huang Bo	Nominated
15th Chinese Film Media Awards	Best Picture	Dearest	Nominated
15th Chinese Film Media Awards	Best Screenplay	Zhang Ji	Nominated
15th Chinese Film Media Awards	Best Actress	Zhao Wei	Won
15th Chinese Film Media Awards	Best Actor	Huang Bo	Nominated
15th Chinese Film Media Awards	Best Supporting Actress	Hao Lei	Nominated
30th Golden Rooster Awards	Best Screenplay	Zhang Ji	Nominated
30th Golden Rooster Awards	Best Actress	Zhao Wei	Nominated
30th Golden Rooster Awards	Best Supporting Actor	Zhang Yi	Won
33rd Hundred Flowers Awards	Best Director	Peter Chan	Nominated
33rd Hundred Flowers Awards	Best Screenplay	Zhang Ji	Nominated
33rd Hundred Flowers Awards	Best Actor	Huang Bo	Nominated
33rd Hundred Flowers Awards	Best Actress	Zhao Wei	Nominated
33rd Hundred Flowers Awards	Best Supporting Actor	Zhang Yi	Nominated
33rd Hundred Flowers Awards	Best New Performer	Li Yiqian	Nominated

== See also ==
- Lost and Love – another film dealing with child kidnapping in China
