= 20 Once Again (film) =

- Theatrical release poster
- Directed by: Leste Chen
- Written by: Lin Xiaoge; Ren Peng
- Produced by: Wang Hong; Roy Hu
- Starring: Yang Zishan; Gua Ah-leh; Chen Bolin; Lu Han
- Cinematography: Charlie Lam
- Edited by: Dai Bing; Yang Hongyu
- Music by: Benson Chong
- Production company: CJ E&M Film Division
- Distributed by: China Film Group Corporation
- Release date: 8 January 2015 (China)
- Running time: 131 minutes
- Countries: China; Taiwan; South Korea
- Language: Mandarin
- Box office: US$59.4 million

20 Once Again (Chinese: 重返20歲; pinyin: Chóng fǎn èrshí suì) is a 2015 fantasy romantic comedy film directed by Leste Chen and starring Yang Zishan, Gua Ah-leh, Bolin Chen and Lu Han. The film is a Chinese-Korean-Taiwanese co-produced remake of Miss Granny. It was released on January 8, 2015.

== Plot ==
Shen Meng Jun (Gua Ah-leh) is a crotchety prideful 70-year-old widow who frequently finds fault with everyone around her. She takes pride in her ability to raise her son single-handedly, despite the poverty during the Cultural Revolution, to become a professor of a prestigious university. She shows her bias towards her grandson Xiang Qian Jin (Lu Han) because he aspires to become a musician and he represents a dream that Meng Jun cannot achieve herself. However, she had no opportunity to be a singer. Although kind to her grandson, she is very critical towards both her daughter-in-law, Yang Qin (Yijuan Li), and granddaughter, Xin Ran (Yin Hang), who openly treats Meng Jun with contempt for the way she treats her mother. This leads to Yang Qin fainting due to the pressure placed on her. After this incident, the family decides it's time for her to go to a nursing home. Feeling forlorn, she wanders the streets and impulsively decides to take a final portrait at a photo studio she happens by. Upon leaving, to her astonishment she realizes that she has been transformed back into her 20-year-old self. Given a magical second chance at youth, she changes her name to Meng Li Jun (Yang Zishan).

After Meng Jun's transformation, she decides to keep her new identity a secret. She begins by renting a room from her trusted friend and past servant, Li Dahai (Deshun Wang). Later, while accompanying Dahai to the senior recreation center, she meets her long-time rival, a flirty senior woman. There, they had an epic singing battle, in which Li Jun wins. Li Jun captured the crowd's heart with her voice. While singing, a music director enters and offers her a chance of a lifetime.

== Cast ==
- Yang Zishan as young Meng Li Jun
  - Gua Ah-leh as 70yr old Meng Li Jun/Shen Meng Jun

Seventy-year-old Li Jun becomes a youth again after visiting a mysterious photo studio. She joins her family and re-experiences the meaning of love, family and music. When Xiang Qian Jin gets into an accident, only she has the same blood type as him and can save his life. She likes Tan Zhi Ming in the end.

- Lu Han as Xiang Qian Jin

The grandson of Li Jun, he is pampered by his grandmother. He aspires to be a singer one day and gets the help of his youthful grandmother who helps fulfil his dreams. Not knowing that Li Jun is his grandmother, he starts developing feelings for her. In the end, when he met with a car accident only his grandmother matched his blood type.

- Chen Bolin as Tan Zhi Ming

Zhi Ming is a musical director who sees potential in Qian Jin and his band. He develops feelings with Li Jun after working with her band.

- Wang Deshun as Li Da Hai

Da Hai was Li Jun's lover as a youth. He continues to hold feelings for Li Jun and is the only one who discovers that Li Jun had become 20 again.

- Zhao Lixin as Xiang Guo Bin

The son of Meng Li Jun who is a professor at a university. He has a wife in Qin and two children: a son, Qian Jin and a daughter, Xin Ran. He wanted to send his own mother to the Nursing Home.

- Li Yijuan as Yang Qin

The wife of Guo Bin, mother of Qian Jin and Xin Ran and daughter-in-law of Meng Li Jun.

- Yin Hang as Xiang Xin Ran

The daughter of Guo Bin and Yang Qin and sister to Qian Jin. The granddaughter of Meng Li Jun who treats her with contempt due to the stress she had put her mother through. It's because of this, Li Jun doesn't get along with Xin Ran and often criticize her for her disrespect.

- Zhou Yutong as Xiao Mei

== Production ==
Principal photography began in June 2014.

== Reception ==
=== Box office ===
By February 8, 2015, the film had earned over US$59.01 million in China. The film had a worldwide total of US$59,396,311 in box office, setting the box office record for Chinese-Korean co-produced films.

== Awards and nominations ==
Year	Award	Category	Recipient	Result
2015	18th Shanghai International Film Festival	Best Actress	Yang Zishan	Won
2015	12th Guangzhou Student Film Festival	Most Popular Film	20 Once Again	Won
2015	12th Guangzhou Student Film Festival	Most Popular Actor	Lu Han	Won
