= Xinjiang Police College =

Education organization in Xinjiang, China

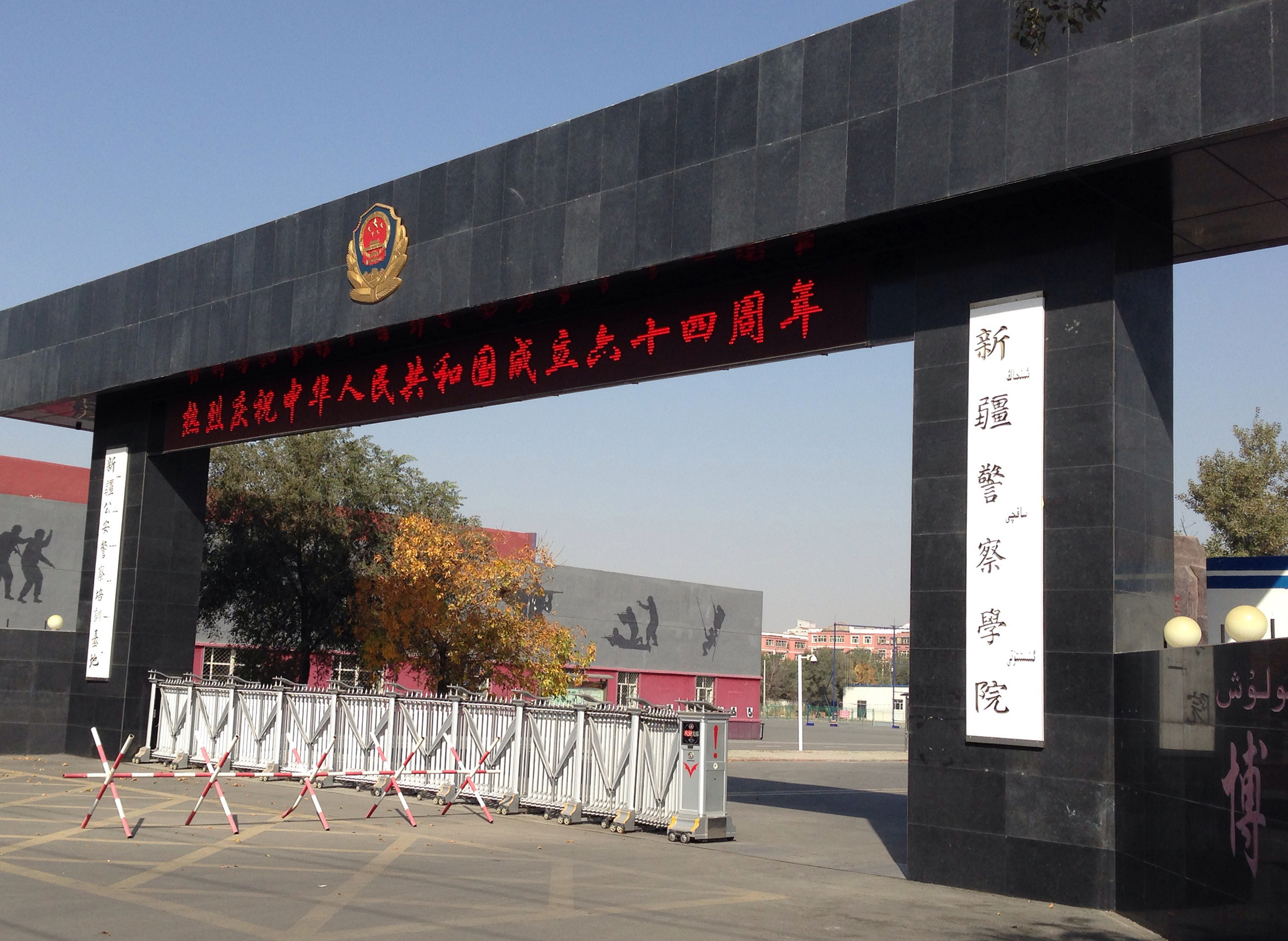
- Gate of Changsha Road Campus of Xinjiang Police College
- Website: www.xjpcedu.cn

Xinjiang Police College (Chinese: 新疆警察学院) is an institution situated in Ürümqi, Xinjiang Uygur Autonomous Region, China.

== History ==
Xinjiang Police College was established in 1950 as Xinjiang Public Security Cadre School. On May 11, 2001, it was formed through the amalgamation of Xinjiang Public Security and Judicial Administration Cadre College and Xinjiang People's Police School. Subsequently, on July 17, 2002, Xinjiang School of Agricultural Mechanization was integrated into Xinjiang Police College, which was elevated to its current status in April 2012. On July 11, 2013, it was formally elevated to a general undergraduate institution.
