= Yang Zishan =

Chinese actress (born 1986)

- 杨子姗
- Yang in The Lion's Secret (2021)
- Born: November 6, 1986 (age 40); Nanjing, Jiangsu, China
- Education: Nanjing University of the Arts
- Occupation: Actress
- Years active: 2005–present
- Agent: Easy Entertainment
- Spouse: Matt Wu (m. 2015)

Chinese name
- Traditional Chinese: 楊子姍
- Simplified Chinese: 杨子姗
Transcriptions

Yang Zishan (Chinese: 杨子姗, born 6 November 1986) is a Chinese actress. She is known for her breakout role in the film So Young (2013), which won her the Huabiao Award for Outstanding New Actress and the Best Actress awards at the 5th China Image Film Festival and the 5th International Chinese Film Festival. It also earned her nominations for best actress for the Golden Rooster Award, the Hundred Flowers Award, and at the Asia-Pacific Film Festival.

== Career ==
In 2015, she won the Best Actress Award at the Shanghai International Film Festival for her performance in 20 Once Again. In 2016, her film One Night Only premiered at the 19th Shanghai International Film Festival. In 2017, She starred in Walking Past the Future, the only Chinese film to be nominated for the Un Certain Regard at the 2017 Cannes Film Festival, and the science fiction thriller Battle of Memories. In 2018, she starred in Till the End of the World, the first film in history to shoot in Antarctica.

In 2020, her film Wuhai premiered at the 68th San Sebastian Film Festival where it competed for the Golden Shell. In 2021, her film Ripples of Life premiered at the 2021 Cannes Film Festival. In 2023, Yang Zishan was appointed the Jury Member of the 25th Shanghai International Film Festival Golden Goblet Award. In 2024, Yang Zishan was appointed the International Jury Member to the 14th Beijing International Film Festival. In 2025, her film Deep in the Mountains premiered at the 15th Beijing International Film Festival where it competed for the Tiantan Award.

== Filmography ==
=== Film ===
Year	English title	Chinese title	Role	Notes
2010	Close to You	近在咫尺的爱恋	Ding Xiaoling	
2010	In Case of Love	街角的小王子	Liangliang	
2011	Lovesick	恋爱恐慌症	Coco	
2013	So Young	致我们终将逝去的青春	Zheng Wei	
2014	Girls	闺蜜	Xiao Mei	
2015	The Unbearable Lightness of Inspector Fan	暴走神探	Song Xiaoqiao	
2015	20 Once Again	重返20岁	Meng Lijun	
2015	Zhong Kui: Snow Girl and the Dark Crystal	钟馗伏魔：雪妖魔灵	Zhong Ling	
2015	Surprise	万万没想到：西游篇	Su Xiaomei	
2015	Legend of a Rabbit: The Martial of Fire	兔侠之青黎传说	Bai Lan	Voice role
2016	One Night Only	天亮之前	Momo	Premiered at the 19th Shanghai International Film Festival
2017	Battle of Memories	記憶大師	Chen Shanshan	
2017	Walking Past the Future	路过未来	Yang Yaoting	Also executive producer; premiered at the 2017 Cannes Film Festival; released in 2018
2018	Till the End of the World	南极之恋	Jing Ruyi	The first film in history to shoot in Antarctica
2019	Adoring	宠爱	Qu Feifei	
2019	Beautiful Guy	嗨！美男子		Post-production
2020	Wu Hai	乌海	Miao Wei	Premiered at the 68th San Sebastian Film Festival; released in 2021
2020	Angel in White	战疫天使		Post-production
2021	Ripples of Life	永安镇故事集	Chen Chen	Premiered at the 2021 Cannes Film Festival; released in 2023
2021	Our New Life	我们的新生活	Xiao Li	
2022	National Mission	国家任务		Post-production
2023	The Sand Murmurs	沙海之门	Bai Zhu	Post-production
2025	Deep in the Mountains	如意饭店	Yan Xue	Premiered at the 15th Beijing International Film Festival

=== Television series ===
Year	English title	Chinese title	Role	Notes
2011	Female Zodiac Stories	发现生活新味	Li Xiaoting	
2012	Gentle Mercy	溫柔的慈悲	Fan Aiqun	
2013	One and Eight	一个和八个	Man Niu	
2014	Our Youth in 1977	我们的青春1977	Chi Qiuyue	
2016	Happy MiTan	欢喜密探	Mysterious girl	Cameo
2017	Wild Rose	红蔷薇	Xia Yuzhu	
2018	Long Time No See	好久不见	Hua Duoduo	
2018	Moonshine and Valentine	结爱·千岁大人的初恋	Princess Xiyan	Cameo
2018	Never Gone	原来你还在这里	Su Yunjin	
2020	A Murderous Affair in Horizon Tower	摩天大楼	Yang Ruisen	
2021	The Lion's Secret	赖猫的狮子倒影	Mu Wanqing	
2022	Two Conjectures About Marriage	婚姻的两种猜想	Shen Mingbao	
2022	Our Times	我们这十年	A Xiang	
2024	The Swimsuit Saga	乘风踏浪	Luo Hong	
2024	City of the City	城中之城	Shen Jing	
TBA	Things Being Hidden	隐瞒之事		

== Discography ==
Year	English title	Chinese title	Album	Notes
2019	"20 Once Again"	重返20岁	20 Once Again OST	
2019	"Adoring"	宠爱	Adoring OST	

== Personal life ==
Yang married actor Matt Wu in 2015. They met while starring in 7-minute romantic drama in Taiwan as part of the 2011 web series Female Zodiac Stories.

== Awards and nominations ==
Year	Award	Category	Nominated work	Result
2013	The 29th Golden Rooster Award	Best Actress	So young	Nominated
2013	The 56th Asia-Pacific Film Festival	Best Actress	So young	Nominated
2013	The 15th Huabiao Award	Outstanding New Actress	So young	Won
2013	The 15th Huabiao Award	Outstanding Actress	So young	Won
2013	The 5th China Image Film Festival	Best Actress	So young	Won
2013	The 5th International Chinese Film Festival	Best Actress	So young	Won
2013	The 1st China International Film Festival London	Best New Actress	So young	Nominated
2013	The 8th Chinese Young Generation Film Forum	New actress of the year	So young	Won
2013	The 6th Top Chinese Music Chart Breakthrough New Artist Awards	Best New Film Actress of the Year	So young	Won
2013	The 4th LETV Film Awards	Influential Film Actress of the Year	So young	Won
2014	The 32nd Hundred Flowers Award	Best Actress	So young	Nominated
2014	The 21st Beijing University Student Film Festival	Best Actress	So young	Nominated
2014	5th China Film Director's Guild Award	Actress of the Year	So young	Nominated
2014	The 14th Chinese Film Media Awards	Most Anticipated Actress	So young	Nominated
2014	2014 Youth's Choice Annual Ceremony	Favorite Movie Actress	Girls	Won
2015	The 15th Chinese Film Media Awards	Most Anticipated Actress	Girls	Nominated
2015	The 18th Shanghai International Film Festival	Best Actress	20 Once Again	Won
2015	The 22nd Beijing University Student Film Festival	Best Actress	20 Once Again	Nominated
2016	The 6th Douban Film Awards 2016	Best Actress	20 Once Again	Nominated
2016	The 16th Chinese Film Media Awards	Most Anticipated Actress	20 Once Again	Nominated
2016	The 16th Chinese Film Media Awards	Best Actress	20 Once Again	Won
2017	The 16th China Film Academy Awards	Academy Award	20 Once Again	Won
2018	The 21st Shanghai International Film Festival	Press Prize for Most Attractive Actress	Walking Past the Future	Nominated
2019	2019 Television Series of China Quality Ceremony	Most Captivating Actress of the Year	Long time no see	Won
2021	The 8th Wenrong Awards	Best Film Actress	Our New Life	Nominated
