= Eastern Liaoning University =

University in Dandong, China

Eastern Liaoning University (ELU) also referred as Liaodong University (Chinese: 辽东学院; pinyin: Liáodōng Xuéyuàn) is a post-secondary institution in Zhen'an District, Dandong, Liaoning Province, China. It is located on the Yalu River, and it has a total of 17,000 students. It was established in April 2003 as a merger of Liaoning Finance College and Dandong Technology College.

== Campuses and Culture ==
ELU covers an area of 10,300,000 square meters. Located in Dandong, the largest border city and a tourist resort of China, it located on the Yalu River bank near the Yellow Sea Coast. The multi-colored azaleas in spring and the golden light-shining ginkgo trees in autumn constitute Dandong's bright traveling characteristics and landscape, which attract friends home and abroad.

== Academics ==
Eastern Liaoning University (ELU), approved by the Ministry of Education in China, subordinates to the educational authority of Liaoning Province. It has developed into a multidisciplinary university, covering a variety of subjects, such as economics, law, literature, physics, engineering, agriculture, medicine, education, and management. College programs and the university degree credits are accepted by all institutions, approved by the Ministry of Education in China. Therefore, students are able to transfer or apply for graduate study in other universities. ELU now has 15 faculties and 5 academic research institutes with 17000 full-time students and 1,158 faculty members, among them are 100 professors and 500 associate professors.

Since 1988, ELU has established friendly cooperative relationships with many universities abroad, such as Lake Superior State University and Eastern Kentucky University in the U.S., Sault College in Canada, University of Sunderland in Britain, Chosun University, Konkuk University, Silla University, Hannam University, Kangnung National University in Korea. ELU has implemented broad cooperation with the above universities in the aspects of sending and exchanging students and teachers, launching international academic seminars and running educational projects. In 2004, ELU set up China-Korea International College with Silla University and Chonju University, Korea.

In order to further promote its Chinese-foreign cultural and educational exchange as well as to make a good use of its high standard teaching resources, ELU recruits foreign students at all levels. Up to the present, we have recruited hundreds of students from Korea, D.P.R.Korea, the U.S., Britain, Russia, Canada, Japan, Australia and Burma. ELU offers all-level Chinese language classes and other subjects to students who need formal education as well as various types of informal education. ELU, by way of its standard management and experienced teaching staff, provides quick and humane service, scientific curriculum, comfortable study and living conditions for the foreign students, who are expected to act as bridges and ties to link the world cultures and communications.

== International students ==
As of 2016 the school has a group of North Korean international students; in the cases of several students, their parents and guardians reside in Dandong.

Humanities Studies: Chinese, English, Japanese

Management: Tourist Management, Engineering Management, Resource Environment and City -Countryside Planning

Economics: World Economy and Trade, Accounting, Accountant Managements

Science and Engineering: Textile Engineering, Mathematics and Applied Mathematics, Machinery Design and Manufacture Automation, Chemical Engineering and Crafts

Computing Science: Information Management and Information System

Arts: Fashion Design
