= Bai Jingting =

Chinese actor and singer

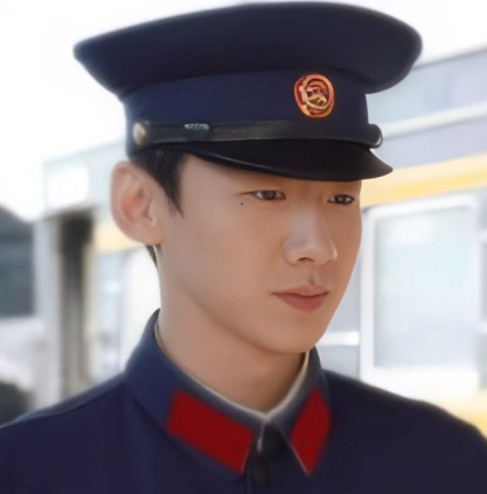
- Bai in 2024
- Born: 15 October 1993 (age 32); Huairou District, Beijing, China
- Other names: Xiao Bai; Bai
- Education: Capital Normal University
- Occupations: Actor; Singer; Model; Entrepreneur
- Years active: 2014–present
- Agent: Bai Jingting Studio
- Notable work: Xing Kelei in You Are My Hero; Xiao Heyun in Reset; Yin Zheng in New Life Begins; Wang Xin in Always on the Move; Sang Yan in The First Frost; Ding Qi in Mobius
- Height: 183 cm (6 ft 0 in)
- Honours: Busan International Film Festival; Seoul International Drama Awards; Asian Television Awards; GQ Person of the Year
- Musical career
- Genres: C-pop
- Instruments: Vocals; Piano
- Years active: 2014–present
- Label: NetEase Cloud Music

Chinese name
- Simplified Chinese: 白敬亭
Transcriptions
Standard Mandarin
- Hanyu Pinyin: Bái Jìngtíng
- Website: iQIYI • Viki • Youku

Bai Jingting (Chinese: 白敬亭, born 15 October 1993) is a Chinese actor, singer and entrepreneur. He is known for roles in the series The First Frost, Mobius, New Life Begins, Reset, for the variety show Who's the Murderer, Natural High and for the film Yesterday Once More. In 2019, Forbes China listed Bai under "30 Under 30 Asia" category, for his professional contributions. He has his wax sculpture unveiled in Madame Tussauds Beijing, China. In February 2025, he sets record of becoming the first and only artist to surpass the 3-platforms Tencent, iQIYI and Youku popularity index thresholds.

Bai founded GoodBai merchandise and café, and artist management Bai Jingting Studio. Since 2021, every drama he led marked a major hit, averaging over 50M views per episode; with his portrayal topping Yunhe's "Male Characters Screen Domination Index". He features regularly in Forbes China Celebrity 100 list. In 2025, he became the first Chinese actor nominated at the 2025 International Streaming Festival's Global OTT Awards, where he also won the People's Choice Best Actor Award.

== Early life and ventures ==
Bai was born in Huairou District, Beijing, and is of Manchu descent. His family belonged to a modest upbringing, where his father was employed as a taxi driver and his mother a homemaker. He completed his schooling at Hongluo Temple Middle School and Beijing Huairuo Hongluosi High School, where he focused on music and sports, particularly high jump and basketball. He excelled in the high jump and secured a championship during middle school.

Bai started learning few musical instruments; he joined piano classes and during national level competition attained 'Grade 10' proficiency certificate in 'Non Professional Artist Assessment'. He participated in China's "Amateur Basketball Competition", and in addition learned to play guitar. He graduated from the Conservatory of Music at Capital Normal University (CNU), majoring in 'Recording Arts'. After the academic year, he interned at a South Korean company to pursue an entertainment career.

=== Business ventures ===
Bai pursued an independent path, bypassing talent agency offers to establish his own studio and enter the entertainment industry. In 2017, he founded "Beijing Leben Film & Television Culture Media Co. Ltd", an agency specializing in media design, production and distribution.

In 2021, Bai founded his merchandise brand 'GoodBai', partnered with fashion designer Shangguan Zhe, who served as creative director to launch a clothing line, and a footwear line, 'ZE by Sankuanz'. In January 2022, "Zhetinghao (Shanghai) Brand Management Co. Ltd", its English name is 'GoodBai', was registered. Capitalizing on this momentum, he opened the 'GoodBai Café' in Shanghai, in the vicinity of his apparel outlet. In August 2025, he refocused the brand strategy on quality and durability, establishing the subsidiary "Qikemeng Brand Management Co. Ltd." to oversee corporate trade and event services.

In 2022, Bai's merchandise 'Goodbai' debuted in the "Top 10 Fashion Brands Appealing to Chinese Consumers". In 2023, the brand organised Pop-up stores in Paris and Singapore during the fashion promotional events. It collaborated with Crocs, to launch an exclusive "Classic Clog" and won 'Collaborator of the Year' at the 'Footwear News Achievement Awards'. In 2024, it associated with Levi's heritage, to create customized collections through experiential marketing. In 2025, it partnered with Lane Crawford to launch the limited edition.

== Acting career ==
=== 2014-2019: Beginnings ===
In 2014, Bai attended the Beijing Film Academy to improve his acting skills. He debuted in Back In Time series, an adaptation of the novel by Jiu Yehui, after his Korean linguist's recommended to audition. In 2015, he garnered recognition for his performance as "Yu Chuyuan" in The Whirlwind Girl, a martial arts series based on the novel by Ming Xiaoxi. He also appeared in the Sohu romantic fantasy web short film Love of Magic, which received positive reception. His adventure show debut came in Bear Grylls' Survivor Games.

In 2016, Bai debuted in the romantic film Yesterday Once More, which exceeded ¥ 100M within three days of its release. He earned popularity through the variety show Who's the Murderer. In 2017, he gained praise for his portrayal of "Lu Zhiang" in a youth drama Rush to the Dead Summer. Additionally, he joined Dunk Of China and Super Penguin League, both prominent live basketball competitive tournaments, with notable participants.

=== 2020-2021: Breakthrough ===
In 2020, Bai got his breakthrough playing a young intern in the acclaimed Chinese remake of South Korean series Misaeng, titled Ordinary Glory, which garnered significant recognition. He debuted as lead in the romance drama Irreplaceable Love. His interactive mini series Target Person was acclaimed on Douban and Zhihu.

In 2021, Bai's popularity surged when he starred as SWAT captain "Xing Kelei" in the military medical romance drama You Are My Hero, which ranked 1st and gained over 1.5B views on Tencent. His table tennis series Ping Pong, light-hearted elderly care series Octogenarians And The 90s, and contemporary reportage drama New Generation were listed in the 32nd Huading Awards 'Top 100 Chinese TV Series Satisfaction Survey'.

=== 2022 onwards: rising popularity ===
In 2022, Bai starred as "Xiao Heyun" in Reset, a time loop series. It exceeded 2B views on Tencent, achieved 30,000 popularity index, and earned him 1st rank in the 'Character Index List'. In 2023, he achieved major success with the historical dramas New Life Begins and Destined, the fastest to reach the 10,000 popularity index on iQIYI. In 2024, his railway police drama Always On The Move won '40 Years of Masterpieces' at the '2025 Beijing Television & Arts Innovation Awards'. He gained recognition on the acclaimed reality show Natural High.

In 2025, Bai starred in The First Frost as "Sang Yan", an adaptation of Zhu Yi romantic novel, which ranked 6th worldwide in Netflix. It achieved fastest 10,000 popularity index on Youku, and earned him 'Top Artist in the Global Market'. His series Mobius ranked among Netflix 'Top 10 Shows' notably across South Asia. In 2026, his satirical superhero comedy film Keep Real grossed over ¥ 100M within a week and earned positive reviews.

== Musical career ==
Bai sung OST for his series during the early years of his career. In December 2017, he performed a piano cover of "Light Chaser" by Yoyo Sham at Hunan TV's New Year's Eve concert. In May 2021, he released his first solo single No Added Sugar: Zero on Happy Camp and NetEase Cloud Music, for which he wrote the lyrics. He participated in the 4th China Central Television Gala, where he sang "Military Salute".

In 2022, Bai presented a piano version of Pachelbel's Canon, the main musical motif of the Reset series, to commemorate its conclusion. In November 2023 at Shenzhen's 'Golden Roc Night, he performed "Moon Landing" and "Don't Go". In 2024, he was star performer during CMG New Year's Gala. He partnered with MaSiWei from Higher Brothers, to release "Why Don't You Girl" on the GoodBai×AFGK CD.

In 2025, Bai sang "The Invisible Man" from The First Frost OST, originally from Stefanie Sun's 2005 album A Perfect Day; it ranked among 'Top 10 Songs' on streaming platforms. At the series finale, he performed a piano rendition of the song "Willful", originally composed by Mayday, a Taiwanese band. On 20 April 2025, he joined Mayday as a special guest, performing two duets with Ashin during their 25th anniversary celebration concert at Tianjin Olympic Centre. This performance achieved YouTube milestone of 10M views within a week of its release on B'in Music.

== Ambassadorships ==
Bai represents major brands worldwide. He is the Brand Ambassador for Louis Vuitton, Cartier, Fragrance Versace, Montblanc Eyewear, Tom Ford Fragrance, KFC, Farfetch, Sulwhasoo, HUALUXE Hotels & Resorts, Crocs, Red Bull, Nescafé, L'Oréal, Junlebao, Vatti, Eggy Party, Jianchun, TNT Space, Kenyue Coffee and RedBMX, China. His notable former ties include Maison Kitsuné, Gucci, Fendi, OPPO, Olay, Neutrogena, Anta Sports and Chivas Regal.

In 2021, Bai became L'Occitane China's spokesperson, leading his first Asia–Pacific campaign for the French skincare brand. In 2023, he became the first Chinese spokesperson for Gentle Monster, a South Korean eyewear brand; and Converse, an American lifestyle company. He as Montblanc's Asia-Pacific ambassador, unveiled premium sophisticated eyewear collection at the '2023 Autumn/Winter' event. He attended Louis Vuitton's 'SS22 Shanghai Spin-Off Show' as an Asian celebrity in Paris.

In December 2024, Bai was named brand ambassador for French sportswear company Salomon Group. In 2025, he as a brand ambassador attended the 'Cartier Nature Sauvage Gala' held at National Gallery Singapore. On 31 May 2025, he became a brand friend of the Chinese electric vehicle marque AITO, and joined its new campaign held in Shenzhen. He appeared as a brand ambassador at the opening of Louis Vuitton's 'Visionary Journeys' flagship store exhibition in Bangkok. In September, the American headwear company New Era announced him as brand ambassador.

=== Fashion ===
Bai initially gained recognition as a model, through competitions before transitioning to acting. He is a prominent fashion figure regularly featured on Vogue, Harper's Bazaar, L'Officiel Hommes, Marie Claire, GQ, Esquire, Elle, Dazed, Grazia, Cosmopolitan, Lion, Uno China, New York Times, Men's Folio, Arena, Condé Nast Traveler, T Magazine, Style, WSJ, NeufMode, and other elite magazines.

== Influence ==
=== Philanthropy ===
Bai is known for his philanthropic efforts to foster education and poverty alleviation. He raised awareness for autistic children through engagements and donations to the China Children's Foundation, and Tianyun Hearing & Speech Rehabilitation Center in Tongzhou, Beijing. He donated ¥ 1M to the 2021 Henan floods relief, donated supplies to the China Relief Foundation to aid the 2023 Northeast China flood, supported the 2023 Jishishan earthquake relief in Gansu, and donated ¥ 2M to the China Rural Development Foundation for 2025 Tibet earthquake relief. In November 2025, he donated ¥1M through the China Social Assistance Foundation, to aid Wang Fuk Court fire victims’ recovery in Hong Kong.

=== Media image ===
As of May 2026, Bai has over 4.6M followers on Instagram and over 37M on Weibo. His success within the industry both critical and commercial earned him title of 'God of Contemporary Idols'. In 2025, he was ranked 1st in 'Top 10 C-Drama Artists in Global Markets', claimed the highest standing in 'Talent International Ranking', ranked 1st in 'Most Famous and Popular Chinese Artist', ranked 2nd in 'Top 5 Gen Z Celebrities', ranked 4th in 'Top 5 Actors in Acting Skills', He was ranked 1st in 'Top 5 Asia Fashion IP and Influencers' and 2nd in 'Most Engaging Celebrity' for the brand endorsements on Douyin. In 2024, he was ranked 1st in 'Most Searched Chinese Actor on Douyin' with 3B viewership. He was listed in '10 Most Handsome Actors' and '20 Most Promising Chinese Actors'. In 2022, he was ranked 9th in 'Top 10 Rising Chinese Actors' and 6th in 'Top 10 Celebrity Weibo Hot Searches'.

=== Litigation ===
In December 2024, after a year of cyberbullying, Bai filed a defamation lawsuit against self media bloggers 'Li and Fang' asserting they fabricated facts claiming he interfered a Spring Festival Gala routine, thereby damaging his reputation. China Central Television confirmed the program proceeded as rehearsed and cleared Bai of any involvement. In February 2025, the Beijing Internet Court ruled for Bai, declaring the defendants lacked evidence to substantiate their accusations. They were ordered to issue a public apology and compensate Bai ¥ 35,000 in reparation.

== Filmography ==
Key
†	Denotes films that have not yet been released

=== Films ===
Year	Title	Role	Note	Ref.
2015	Love Of Magic	Jiang Yizhe	Web Short Film	
2015	Unique Way	Lu Shu	Web Short Film	
2016	Yesterday Once More	Gao Xiang	Debut	
2019	Youthful China In The Headlines	Yang Xiangguo	Short film	
2021	Our New Life	-	Cameo	
2026	Keep Real	Wang Changhai	Lead role	

=== Television series ===
Year	Title	Role	Note	Ref.
2014	Back in Time	Qiao Ran	Second Lead	
2014	Wonder Lady; S3 EP:4,5	Xiao Bai	Cameo	
2015	The Whirlwind Girl	Yu Chuyuan	Main Role	
2017	Rush to the Dead Summer	Lu Zhiang	Second Lead	
2018	The Rise of Phoenixes; EP:13 Onwards	Gu Nanyi	Supporting Role	
2020	Ordinary Glory	Sun Yiqiu	Main Role	
2020	Target Person	Hao Ran	Main Role	
2020	Irreplaceable Love	Li Luoshu	Lead Role	
2021	Ping Pong	Xu Tan	Lead Role	
2021	You Are My Hero	Xing Kelei	Lead Role	
2021	Octogenarians and the 90s	Guo Sanshuang	Lead Role	
2021	New Generation; Story 5: Because I Have a Home EP:33-40	Zhuang Xiaodong	Lead Role	
2022	Reset	Xiao He Yun	Lead Role	
2022	New Life Begins	Yin Zheng	Lead Role	
2023	Destined	Gu Jiusi	Lead Role	
2023	Never Too Late	Zhou Ye Wen	Main Role	
2024	Always on the Move	Wang Xin	Lead Role	
2025	The First Frost	Sang Yan	Lead Role	
2025	Justifiable Defense	Li Mufeng	Main Role	
2025	Mobius	Ding Qi	Lead Role	
2026	Detective Hours: In Our Prime	Ren Jiangchuan	Lead Role	
TBA	War and People †	Tong Jiating	Lead Role	

=== Dubbing works ===
Year	Title	Network	Note
2021	Historical Documentary "China"	Mango TV	Episode 3: Torrent

=== Variety shows ===
Year	Title	Role	Ref.
2015	Survivor Games	Main Member	
2016	Who's the Murderer	Main Member	
2016	Fighting Man	Main Member	
2017	Who's the Murderer; Season:2	Main Member	
2017	Who's the Murderer; Season:3	Main Member	
2018	Twenty-Four Hours; Season:3	Main Member	
2018	Who's the Murderer; Season:4	Main Member	
2018	Super Penguin League; Season:1	Initiator; Live Basketball Competition	
2019	Dunk Of China; Season:2	Initiator; Live Basketball Competition	
2019	Who's the Murderer; Season:5	Main Member	
2020	Who's the Murderer; Season:6	Main Member	
2022	The Oasis	Main Member	
2023	Natural High	Main Member	
2024	Natural High; Season:2	Main Member	
2025	Natural High; Season:3	Main Member	
2026	Natural High; Season:4	Main Member	

=== Other shows ===
Year	Title	Role	Ref.
2018	Who's The Keyman; EP:7,8	Participant	
2018	Happy Camp; S2, S9-S12	Participant	
2020	Go Fridge; S6 EP:7,8	Participant	
2021	Great Escape; S3 EP:3,4	Participant	
2021	Super Brain; S8 EP:7	Participant	
2022	Go Fighting! S8 EP:5	Participant	
2022	Ace Vs Ace; S7 EP:2	Participant	
2023	Go Fighting! S9 EP:12	Participant	
2024	Hello Saturday; EP:6	Participant	
2025	Hello Saturday; EP:9	Participant	

== Discography ==
=== Singles ===
Year	Title	Artist	Ref.
2021	No Added Sugar: Zero		
2023	Don't Go		
2023	Moon Landing		

=== OST ===
Year	Title	Album	Artist	Ref.
2014	One Flower	Back in Time		
2014	All the Way	Back in Time	with Yang Le, Du Weihan	
2016	Confusion Of Youth	Yesterday Once More	with Li Hongyi, Ding Guansen & Zhao Wenlong	
2016	Let's Fight; Theme Song	Fighting Man	with Jing Boran, Yang Shuo	
2021	Glory Of Ping Pong	Ping Pong	with Timmy Xu	
2021	One Left And One Right	Ping Pong		
2023	Wish To Be Like The Wind	Destined	with Yi Dong	
2023	True Colour	Destined		
2025	The Invisible Man	The First Frost		
2025	Feifei Run	Mobius	with Muma Band	
2026	Keep Real	Keep Real	with Melo & Deng Dianguo	

=== Piano performance ===
Year	Piano Version	Artist	Note	Ref.
2018	Light Chaser (Zhui Guang Zhe)		Hunan New Year Concert; Original singer: Yoyo Sham	
2022	Pachelbel's Canon		Reset Signature Ringtone	
2025	Willful	with Zhang Ruonan	Original Band: Mayday	

=== Collaboration & cover version ===
Year	Title	Artist	Note
2022	The Lone Warrior (Gu Yong Zhe)		Arcane Cover MV Version; Original song by Eason Chan
2024	Why Don't You Girl	with MaSiWei	GoodBai × AFGK CD

=== Live concerts ===
Year	Title	Events	Artist	Ref.
2018	Chengdu	New Year Concert	With Bibi Zhou, Jennifer Chan	
2019	I Love You, China	70th Anniversary: Foundation of China	With Various Artists	
2020	Want To See You (Xiang Jian Ni)	China TV Drama Awards	With Tan Songyun	
2020	Your Answer (Ni De Da An)	Year Of Fighting Event	With Huang Xiaoyun	
2021	Military Salute	China Central TV Gala	With Vin Zhang	
2021	Goodnight	JD 618 Night Event	With Xiao Gui	
2021	Sparrow	JD 11.11 Night Event	With Lee Young-ho	
2022	The Lone Warrior	Summer Graduation Concert	With Zhou Shen	
2023	Don't Go	Douyin Wonderful Night Event	With Jike Junyi	
2024	Passing By	NZND Concert	With Wei Daxun	
2024	Climbing Spring Mountain (Shang Chunshan)	Spring Festival Gala	With Wei Chen, Wei Daxun	
2025	Willful	Mayday's "Back To That Day" Concert	With Ashin	
2025	Step By Step	Mayday's "Back To That Day" Concert	With Ashin	
2025	FeiFei Run	Mini Muma Concert	With Muma Band	

=== Soundtrack appearances ===
Year	Title	Artist	Channel	Note	Ref.
2025	Willful	Mayday	B'in Music	The First Frost OST	
2025	I'm So Into You	Xiao Bingchih	B'in Music	The First Frost OST	
2025	Like Sunny Days, Like Rainy Days	Silence Wang	Dreamer Music	The First Frost OST	

== Awards and nominations ==
Year	Award	Category	Work	Status	Ref.
2015	Star Show Award Ceremony	Trendy Newcomer		Won	
2015	China TV Drama Ceremony Jury Award	Best New Actor	The Whirlwind Girl	Nominated	
2016	13th Guangzhou Student Film Festival	Favorite Character: Gao Xiang	Yesterday Once More	Won	
2016	2nd OK! The Style Awards	Most Loved New Actor		Won	
2016	FHM 12th Anniversary Night	Most Promising Popular Idol		Won	
2016	Fashion Cosmo Beauty Festival	Youth Idol		Won	
2016	Youku Young Choice Awards	Role Model		Won	
2017	NetEase Attitude Awards	Young Actor Award	Yesterday Once More	Won	
2017	Shanghai Film Critics Awards	Best New Actor	Yesterday Once More	Nominated	
2017	The Actors of China Awards	Outstanding Actor	Rush to the Dead Summer	Won	
2017	The Actors of China Awards	Best Performance By An Actor	Rush to the Dead Summer	Won	
2019	2nd Cultural & Entertainment Industry Congress	Fashion Trending Figure		Won	
2020	Douyin Star Motion Night:	Best Performing Actor of the Year		Won	
2020	Weibo Awards	Anticipated Actor of the Year	Ordinary Glory	Won	
2020	12th China TV Drama Awards	Leap Actor of the Year	Ordinary Glory	Won	
2021	The 32nd Huading Awards	Best Actor In a Contemporary TV Series	Ordinary Glory	Nominated	
2021	6th China TV Drama Quality Jury Awards	Media's Most Noticed Television Star	Ordinary Glory	Won	
2021	6th China TV Drama Quality Jury Awards	Weibo Most Noticed Actor	Ordinary Glory	Won	
2021	2nd Screen Integration Communication Ceremony	Vibrant Actors on Screen	Ping Pong	Won	
2021	Weibo Awards	Actor of the Year	You Are My Hero	Won	
2021	Bazaar Annual Awards	Charming Icon		Won	
2021	The 16th Seoul International Drama Festival	Best Actor	You Are My Hero	Nominated	
2021	GQ Person of the Year Ceremony	The Most Powerful Person		Won	
2022	Zhihu Awards	Actor Of the Year	Reset	Won	
2023	GQ Person Of the Year Ceremony	The Most Powerful Person	Reset	Won	
2023	The 35th Huading Awards	Most Popular Actor In a Television Series	Reset	Nominated	
2023	3rd New Era International Television Festival Conch Award	Most Popular Actor In the New Era	Reset	Nominated	
2023	iQIYI TV & Movie Jury Awards	Annual Influential Actor	New Life Begins	Won	
2024	Weibo Awards	Quality Actor of the Year	Destined	Won	
2024	iQIYI TV & Movie Jury Awards	Best Popular Actor	Destined	Won	
2024	15th Golden Lotus Awards (Macau International Movie & Television Festival)	Best Actor	Always On The Move	Nominated	
2024	China TV Drama Quality Jury Awards	Breakthrough Performance By The Star of The Year	Always On The Move	Won	
2025	Weibo Awards	Quality Actor of the Year	Always On The Move	Won	
2025	3rd CMG China TV Drama Annual Ceremony	Breakthrough Actor of The Year: Male	Always On The Move	Won	
2025	Tencent Video TV And Movie Award	Popular Variety Show Group of the Year	Natural High; Season 2	Won	
2025	5th New Era International TV Festival	Most Popular Actor of the New Era	Always On The Move	Nominated	
2025	International Streaming Festival's Global OTT Awards	Best Leading Actor: Asian Content	The First Frost	Nominated	
2025	International Streaming Festival's Global OTT Awards	People's Choice Awards: Best Actor	The First Frost	Won	
2025	Weibo TV & Internet Video Summit	Best Drama Actor		Nominated	
2025	Weibo TV & Internet Video Summit	Best Drama Character	Sang Yan: The First Frost	Nominated	
2025	Weibo TV & Internet Video Summit	Best Drama Character	Ding Qi: Mobius	Nominated	
2025	Weibo TV & Internet Video Summit	Best Drama Character	Li Mufeng: Justifiable Defense	Nominated	
2025	Weibo TV & Internet Video Summit	Best Drama Couple: Sang Yan & Wen Yifan	The First Frost	Nominated	
2025	30th Asian Television Awards	Best Actor in Leading Role	The First Frost	Nominated	
2025	Comprehensive Survey on the Strength of Television and Online Audiovisual Media	Best Lead Actor	Mobius	Won	
2026	Huanwang Big Data Awards	Best Actor	The First Frost	Nominated	
2026	Huanwang Big Data Awards	Popular Actor of the Year	The First Frost	Nominated	
2026	Weibo Awards	Character of the Year: Ding Qi	Mobius	Nominated	
2026	Weibo Awards	Most Influential Actor of the Year		Won	
2026	SMG TV Drama Quality Awards	Quality Strength Drama Star of the Year		Won	
2026	Seoul International Drama Awards	Outstanding Asian Star: China	Mobius	Nominated	
