= 618 (disambiguation) =

618 is a year.

618 may also refer to:

- 618 (number), a natural number following 617 and preceding 619
- Area code 618, a telephone area code in the North American Numbering Plan for southern Illinois
- 618 shopping day, a shopping festival created by JD.com
- The international telephone code for Adelaide, Australia
- Mazda 618, a compact car
