= Legend of the Phoenix =

- Promotional image

Chinese name
- Traditional Chinese: 鳳弈
- Simplified Chinese: 凤弈
Transcriptions
Standard Mandarin
- Hanyu Pinyin: Fèngyì
- Genre: Historical, romantic comedy
- Written by: Zhang Huabiao
- Directed by: Wei Hantao
- Starring: He Hongshan; Jeremy Tsui; Cao Xiwen; Wayne Lai
- Country of origin: China
- Original language: Mandarin
- No. of seasons: 1
- No. of episodes: 41

Production
- Executive producers: Fang Fang; Yu Haiyan
- Production location: Hengdian World Studios

Original release
- Network: Hunan Television
- Release: May 28, 2019

Legend of the Phoenix (Chinese: 凤弈) is a 2019 Chinese historical romantic comedy television series starring He Hongshan, Jeremy Tsui, Cao Xiwen and Wayne Lai. Produced by Shanghai Tencent Penguin Film Culture Communication Co., Ltd and Shanghai Drama Apple Limited, it debuted on Tencent Video and myVideo on May 28, 2019. The series followed the love story between Ye Ningzhi, a travelling artist, and General Wei Guang during the Great Liang in ancient China.

== Plot ==
During the rule of Great Liang, an artist named Ye Ningzhi performed at a banquet in front of the Empress Dowager. However, she was accused of treason by Pang Zhen, the Princess. Luckily, Ningzhi was saved by a general named Wei Guang, who later became her lover. Two years later, Ningzhi enters the palace and becomes the palace maid of the Empress. She witnessed the struggles of the palace and politics, and with her wits and skills survives the game of power.

== Cast ==
=== Main ===
- He Hongshan as Ye Ningzhi, a travelling artist who becomes a maid later, she loves Wei Guang.
- Jeremy Tsui as Wei Guang, a general in the Great Liang.
- Cao Xiwen as Zheng Shujun, Empress of the Great Liang.
- Wayne Lai as Lang Kun, minister.

=== Supporting ===
- Liu Min as Pang Zhen, Princess of Great Liang; sister of the Emperor of Great Liang.
- Cui Peng as Pang Tong, Emperor of Great Liang.
- Wang Xichao as Pang Yu, prince of Great Liang; brother of the Emperor of Great Liang.
- Luo Qiuyun as Ban Ling'er, a maid who becomes a concubine later, evil and dies later
- Liu Chenxia as Empress dowager.
- Bai Haitao as Yan Kuan.
- Nan Fulong as Yan Zheng.
- Wang Ruizi as Concubine Fu.
- Shao Sihan as Hua Zhangshi.
- Luo Siwei as Ah Jiao.
- Chen Haoming as Ah Qiao.
- Zhang Jialing as Zi Ling.
- Qiao Xi as Chen Xue.

== Soundtrack ==
No.	Title	Lyrics	Music	Singer(s)	Length
1.	"Fengyi (凤弈)" (Opening theme)	Duan Sisi	Tan Xuan	Li Ziting
2.	"Yinghuo (萤火)" (Ending theme)	Liu Chang	Tan Xuan	Zhang Yihao and Zi Ning
3.	"Hongchen Xiangkan (红尘相看)" (Interlude)	Duan Sisi	Tan Xuan	Li Qi
4.	"Yinian Zhichi (一念咫尺)" (Interlude)	Liu Chang	Tan Xuan	Dong Shiyun

== Production ==
Hong Kong director Wei Hantao (Lotus Lantern, The Story of Han Dynasty and The Starry Night, The Starry Sea) was signed to direct the series from a script by Zhang Huabiao.

For the first time, He Hongshan acted as a leading female role and Jeremy Tsui acted as a leading male role.

Principal photography started on April 15, 2018 and wrapped on July 15, 2018.

== Awards and nominations ==
Award	Category	Nominee	Results	Ref.
Golden Bud - The Fourth Network Film And Television Festival	Best Web Series	Legend of the Phoenix	Nominated	
Golden Bud - The Fourth Network Film And Television Festival	Best Actor	Xu Zhengxi	Nominated	
Golden Bud - The Fourth Network Film And Television Festival	Best Actress	He Hongshan	Nominated	

== International broadcast ==
Region	Network	Dates	Notes
Malaysia	8TV	23 October 2019 - 18 December 2019 (Monday to Friday at 8:35 PM)	Original
Hong Kong, Macau	TVB Jade	18 November 2019 - 3 January 2020 (Monday to Friday at 8:30 PM)	Dubbed with Cantonese
