= Destined (TV series) =

2023 Chinese historical series

- Promotional poster
- Genre: Historical drama; Romance
- Based on: Chang Feng Du by Mo Shubai
- Developed by: iQIYI
- Written by: Bai Jingjing; Mo Shubai
- Directed by: Ying Tao
- Starring: Bai Jingting; Song Yi
- Country of origin: China
- Original language: Mandarin
- No. of episodes: 40

Production
- Production location: China
- Running time: 45 minutes
- Production company: iQIYI

Original release
- Network: iQIYI
- Release: 18 June – 14 July 2023

Destined (Chinese: 长风渡) is a 2023 Chinese series directed by Yin Tao and starring Bai Jingting and Song Yi. On 18 June 2023, it was aired on iQIYI. Based on Mo Shubai's web novel of the same name, the series tells the story of Liu Yuru, the daughter of a cloth merchant, and Gu Jiusi, a carefree young master; who get stuck in a mismatched marriage; it's their journey from conflict to mutual respect.

== Plot ==
Liu Yuru, the legitimate eldest daughter of a cloth merchant in Yangzhou, had suffered for years under her father's concubine. Growing up, she learned to be cautious and gentle at all times, hiding her strong personality. Unexpectedly, she is forced to marry Gu Jiusi, the only son of the wealthiest family in Jiangnan who is known for his carefree lifestyle. Their relationship develops through trust, respect and mutual understanding.

== Cast ==
- Bai Jingting as Gu Jiusi
- Song Yi as Liu Yuru
  - Li Zhi Mo as Liu Yuru (young)

Gu Jiusi's Mansion

- Sha Yi as Gu Langhua
- Zhao Zi Qi as Jiang Rou
- Ai Mi as Yin Hong, Liu Yuru's attendant
- Yan Jie as Wang Shou, guard of Liu Mansion
- Zhang Ying Bing as Rui Xue, Gu Jiu's attendant
- Li Xiao Pang as Mu Nan, attendant of Liu Manor

Liu Yuru's Mansion

- Zhang Xi Lin as Liu Xuan, Liu Yuru's father
- Zhang Yan Yan as Su Wan, Liu Yuru's mother
- Hu Ke as Zhang Yue'er, concubine of Liu Xuan
- Wei Yi as Liu Yuzhao, daughter of Zhang Yue'er
- Ma Jun Ke as Liu Yuying, daughter of Zhang Yue'er
- Shao Hao Lin as Liu Yumao, son of Zhang Yue'er
- Zhang Ting Fei as Yun Yun, Su Wan's attendant
- Ren Jun Xi as Gui Xiang, Zhang Yueer's attendant

Ye Mansion

- Wu Mian as Liang Qingyu, Old Madame of Ye Family
- Zhang Hao Wei as Ye Shian, son of Ye Family
- Zhang Wei Na as Ye Yun, daughter of Ye family. Liu Yuru's close friend

Palace

- Kong Lin as Empress Dowager
- Wang Ce as Prince Liang
- Cheng Zi as Princess Yun Chang

== Soundtrack ==
Title	Artist	Music	Lyrics	Length	Ref.
It's You; Theme Song	Zhang Xianzi & Li Mao	Hu Xiaoou	Yang Yuxiao	4:15	
Softly; Ending Song	Jane Zhang	Yao Beina	Yang Yuxiao	4:17	
Wish To Be Like The Wind	Bai Jingting & Yi Dong	Liu Huan	Yang Yuxiao	4:16	
Hastily	Liu Yuning	Yao Beina	Yang Yuxiao	4:06	
True Color	Bai Jingting	Yao Beina	Yang Yuxiao	3:10	
Only Wish	Jiang Dunhao	Yao Beina	Yang Yuxiao	3:45	
Two Letters	Deng Yujun	Yao Beina	Yang Yuxiao	4:33	
Immovable	Ayueyue	Zheng Zhuoqun	Yang Yuxiao	4:50	

- HongKong version:

Title	Artist
Holding a Hundred Years (Theme Song)	Lin Chi-lok, Zhao Xiaoting
Snow Along the Road (Ending Theme Song)	Yawei

== Reception ==
The series was national and internationally successful, becoming fastest drama on IQIYI to reach the 10,000 popularity mark. The leads performance was critically and commercially appreciated. It had the highest rating of 19.5 points and over 1.25M viewership within a week, during its Hongkong release. It's cinematography and plot dynamic was critically acclaimed. The series remained among "iQIYI Top 10 Dramas" maintaining its lasting popularity.

== Production ==
On 15 June 2022, the cast was officially announced. On 7 November 2022, filming ended and a set of posters was released. On 10 May 2023, another set of posters was released alongside a preview. On 17 June 2023, the show's broadcasting day on iQIYI was announced. On 26 June 2023, it premiered on CCTV-8.

== Ratings ==
Premiere ratings on TVB Jade in Hong Kong, China.

Episodes	Average live TV ratings	Cross Platforms live broadcast ratings	Ref.
All Episodes	15.9	20.1	

== Awards and nominations ==
Year	Award	Category	Work	Status	Ref.
2023	3rd Global Film and Television Culture Communication Summit	Excellent series in international communication	Destined	Won	
2023	Chinese American Film Festival (C.A.F.F.) Golden Angel Awards	Outstanding TV Series	Destined	Won	
2023	Hengdian Film Festival of China WenRong TV Awards	Best Producer	Bei Yang	Won	
2023	IQIYI TV & Movie Jury Awards	Longform TV Series of the Year	Destined	Won	
2023	IQIYI TV & Movie Jury Awards	Enterprising Actor of the Year	Zhang Haowei	Won	
2023	IQIYI TV & Movie Jury Awards	Young Actor of the Year	Song Yi	Won	
2023	IQIYI TV & Movie Jury Awards	Best Popular Actor	Bai Jingting	Won	
2023	IQIYI TV & Movie Jury Awards	Special Honor		Won	
2024	Weibo Awards Ceremony	Dazzling Actor of the Year	Song Yi	Won	
2024	Weibo Awards Ceremony	Quality Actor of the Year	Bai Jingting	Won	
2024	Star Awards Ceremony	Best Song Written By Television	Holding a Hundred Years (Hongkong Version by Lin Chi-lok & Zhao Xiaoting)	Nominated	
2024	Star Awards Ceremony	Best Song Written By Television	Snow is Falling Along the Road (Hongkong Version by Yawei)	Nominated	
2024	Capital TV Spring Program Promotion Conference	Best TV Series of the Year	Destined	Won	
2024	Golden Screenwriters' Night	Best Adapted Screenplay For Long Series	Bai JinJin, Ruyuan Xi, Nianqing Shen & Jiwen Sun	Won	
2024	Annual Chinese TV Drama Ceremony	Overseas Communication Drama of the Year	Destined	Won	
2024	Annual Chinese TV Drama Ceremony	Best Breakthrough Actor in a Television Series	Bai Jingting	Won	
