= Reset (Chinese TV series) =

2022 Chinese TV series

- Official poster
- 开端
- Genre: Time travel; Mystery; Thriller
- Created by: Hou Hongliang
- Based on: Kai Duan by Qi Dao Jun
- Written by: Qidaojun; Qiu Yujie; Suan; Huang Kaiwen; Yuan Jixi; Wei Shining
- Directed by: Sun Molong; Liu Hongyuan; Suan
- Starring: Bai Jingting; Zhao Jinmai; Liu Yijun
- Ending theme: "My Only" by Zhou Shen
- Composer: Kim Hyun-do
- Country of origin: China
- Original language: Mandarin
- No. of episodes: 15

Production
- Executive producer: Li Liming
- Producers: Li Huabing; Han Zhijie
- Production locations: Xiamen, China
- Running time: 45 minutes
- Production company: Daylight Entertainment

Original release
- Network: Tencent Video
- Release: 11 January – 25 January 2022

Reset (Chinese: 开端; pinyin: Kāiduān; lit. 'Beginning') is a 2022 Chinese time-travel whodunit series, starring Bai Jingting and Zhao Jinmai. It is based on a novel 'Kai Duan' by Qi Dao Jun, and is directed by Sun Molong and Liu Hongyuan. It tells the story of game designer Xiao Heyun and college student Li Shiqing, who are trapped in a time loop after a bus explosion; they works together to escape the tragedy. On 11 January 2022, it was released on Tencent Video, Line TV and Viki. It sets record of exceeding fastest 30,000 'Popularity Heat Index' points, and surpassed over 2 Billion views on Tencent.

Within a week, it had an average of over 130 Million views per episode on Tencent. It was a critical and commercial success, and won many awards. Its success led to the release in South Asian countries and on Netflix. In September 2023, producer Hou Hongliang and writer Qidaojun announced a companion series Restart. It has consistently ranked in Douban’s Top 10 highest-rated suspense dramas.

== Plot ==
University student Li Shiqing is riding the Route 45 bus when she becomes trapped in a time loop, which resets every time the bus explodes, killing all passengers on board. In one iteration, Li Shiqing pulls a fellow passenger, Xiao Heyun, a game designer, off the bus just before the explosion, inadvertently bringing him into the loop with her. Though they manage to disembark and avoid dying, the loop continues to reset whenever they fall asleep. Realizing that escaping the loop may require saving everyone on the bus, they begin working together to investigate the passengers and identify the bomber.

As their investigation unfolds, Li Shiqing and Xiao Heyun develop empathy and compassion for their fellow passengers—each with their own story, often different from first impressions. They also encounter the police multiple times, particularly Deputy Captain Zhang Cheng. During these repeated encounters at the police station, they try to extract information and gain the authorities’ cooperation, using what they've learned in each iteration.

In the final loop, Li Shiqing contacts Zhang Cheng to warn him of the bomb, enabling the police to set up a roadblock and stop the bus. Working with the other passengers, Li Shiqing and Xiao Heyun manage to prevent further harm and bring the main perpetrators to justice. Li Shiqing and Xiao Heyun, who have grown close through their shared ordeal, acknowledge their feelings for each other.

== Cast ==
=== Main Casts ===
Actor	Role	Note	Hong Kong Dubbing
Bai Jingting	Xiao Heyun	Programmer/ Game developer	Zhang Fangzheng
Zhao Jinmai	Li Shiqing	A student caught in a loop	Huang Xinyu

=== Bus No. 45 ===
Actor	Role	Note	Hong Kong Dubbing
Huang Jue	Wang Xingde	The driver of the bus	Ye Zhensheng
Liu Dan	Tao Yinghong	A woman carrying a red plastic bag	Xu Ying
Ma Lan	Yaopo	A passenger riding on the bus with a purse	Lin Danfeng
Zeng Kelang	Lu Di	He enters the bus with a backpack	Huang Jiquan
Zhang Xiqian	Ma Guoqiang	A farmer with woven bag	Chen Yongxin
Jiao Peng	Jiao Xiangrong	A migrant worker with a large red suitcase	Zhao Shiliang
Song Jiateng	One brother	An Influencer doing live stream	Deng Zhijian
Bu Yuxin	Muscular man	A man with headphone	Chen Zhuozhi

=== Jialin Public Security Bureau ===
Actor	Role	Note	Hong Kong Dubbing
Liu Yijun	Zhang Cheng	Deputy Captain of Criminal Investigation	Li Jinlun
Liu Tao cameo	Du Jinsong	Deputy Director	Lu Huiling
	Jiang Feng	Policeman who has a master-student relationship with Zhang Cheng	Chen Yaonan
Fan Shuaiqi	Ye Qian	Police officer	Ye Xiaoxin
Yu Peishan	Yu Lei	Police officer	Li Zhenran
Bozhan Ju	Police Officer Lu	Police officer	
Gao Haipeng	Officer Qin	Policeman in charge of investigating an old case	Pan Wenbai
Ren Shuai	Xia Jiang	High-level police officer	Liang Zhida

=== Other characters ===
Actor	Role	Note	Hong Kong Dubbing
You Jingru	Liu Yao	Witness	Zhang Songxin
Wu Juejin		Liu Yao's mother	Yuan Shuzhen
Chen Jingyi	Wang Mengmeng	Daughter of Wang Xingde	Zhan Jianer
Ma Bo		Wang Xingde's roommate	Guan Lingqiao
Bai Yufan	Liu Peng	Working partner of Xiao Heyun at their game studio	Li Kaijie
Zhao Qianzi	Liu Caicai	Ma Guoqiang's wife	Shen Xiaolan
Mu Tong	Ma Xiaolong	Ma Guoqiang's son	Li Kaijie
Qian Yi		Lu Di's father	Lu Guoquan
Chen Wei		Lu Di's mother	Yuan Shuzhen
Zhang Jinglan	Jiao Jiao	Jiao Xiangrong's daughter	Chen Haoyi
Wang Hong		Driver	Zhang Jinjiang
Zhang Lingxin	Dr. Mo		Liu Huiyun Chen Haoyi
Chen Muyang	Cong Rong	Fire chief	Guan Lingqiao
Wang Ting		Police dispatcher	Wei Hui'e
Wu Qijiang	Master Zhu	The driver	Zhai Yaohui
Li Kewei	Fan Yonggang		Chen Zhuozhi
Liu Guanlin	Mr. Yang	Owner of the bus company	Thunder
Wei Wei			
Li Bin		Deputy Mayor	Pan Wenbai
Qiao Mu	Nurse Xiaolu		Liao Xinyi
Xu Wei	Teacher Wu	Li Shiqing's counselor at school	Chen Qinyun
Yi Ming	He Yingjun	The pervert on the bus	
Li Jinjiang		Delivery driver	
Zhang Hao		Dump truck driver	
Wang Feng		Tank truck driver	Xiao Huiyong
Wang Peilu			
Wang Zhi		Fireman	Hu Jiahao
Ding Wenbo	Qianzi		
Miss Chen	Sister Yu		Chen Qinyun
Zhang Wenxin		A passenger on the bus	He Luyi
Huo Yujia		The wife of Zhang Cheng	Huang Fengying

== Soundtrack ==
Title	Artist	Lyrics	Music	Length
My Only; Ending Theme	Zhou Shen	Wang Shilin	Kim Hyun Do	3:40
Wake Up; Theme song	Wang Xiaokun	Wang Shilin	Kim Hyun Do	3.01
Rebound	Chen Hui	Wang Shilin	Kim Hyun Do	3:21

== Reception ==
In 2022, the series trended on the Weibo search, and earned Bai Jingting 1st rank in the "Character Index List" in drama category. It has been highly rated on both Douban and IMDb. ranked among the Top 5 in both popularity and average episode viewership across various platforms in the suspense drama category. The mystery, realism and thrilling plot twists was acclaimed. Its popularity sparked discussions on social issues like social responsibility and cyberbullying.

Bai Jingting presented a piano version of Pachelbel's Canon, the main musical motif of the series, to commemorate its conclusion. The series' success led to its release on TrueID Thailand, CS Channel 'Satellite Theater' in Japan, and on Line TV Taiwan. It also got released in South Korea, Indonesia and HongKong. It premiered on Netflix in Taiwan, Singapore, Vietnam, Malaysia and Brunei.

== Awards and nominations ==
Year	Award	Category	Nominee	Result	Ref.
2022	31st China TV Golden Eagle Award	Best Supporting Actor	Liu Yijun	Nominated	
2022	31st China TV Golden Eagle Award	Best TV Series		Nominated	
2022	China Domestic TV series Ceremony	Outstanding Actor of the Year	Huang Jue	Won	
2022	China Domestic TV series Ceremony	Outstanding Director of the Year	Sun Molong	Won	
2022	China Domestic TV series Ceremony	Outstanding TV series		Won	
2022	Golden Bud Network Film and Television Festival	Annual Innovative Web Drama		Won	
2022	Golden Bud Network Film and Television Festival	Powerful Actor of the Year	Liu Yijun	Nominated	
2022	Tencent Video TV And Movie Award	Audience Favorite Drama of the Year		Won	
2022	Tencent Video TV And Movie Award	VIP's Favorite Drama of the Year		Won	
2022	Tencent Video TV And Movie Award	Innovative Drama Series of the Year		Won	
2022	Tencent Video TV And Movie Award	Outstanding Screenplay of the Year	Qidaojun, Qiu Yujie, Luo Suan & Huang Kaiwen	Won	
2022	Tencent Video TV And Movie Award	Producer of the Year	Hou Hongliang	Won	
2022	Zhi Hu Film and TV Award	Actor of the Year	Bai Jingting	Won	
2022	Golden Screenwriters' Night	Best Miniseries Screenplay	Qidaojun, Qiu Yujie, Luo Suan & Huang Kaiwen	Won	
2022	Youth Film Manual Annual Award	Breakthrough Performance of the Year	Liu Dan	Won	
2023	3rd Global Film and Television Culture Communication Summit Forum and Annual Selection	Innovative Drama Series of the Year		Won	
2023	China College Student Television Festival - Jury Awards	Best Drama		Won	
2023	China Television Annual Ranking Award	Best Supporting Actress in a Television Series	Liu Dan	Won	
2023	China Television Annual Ranking Award	Popular TV Series of the Year		Won	
2023	13th Macau International Television Festival (Golden Lotus Awards)	Best Leading Actor	Bai Jingting	Nominated	
2023	13th Macau International Television Festival (Golden Lotus Awards)	Best Supporting Actress	Liu Dan	Nominated	
2023	28th Shanghai Television Festival (Magnolia Awards)	Best Television Series		Nominated	
2023	28th Shanghai Television Festival (Magnolia Awards)	Best Supporting Actress	Liu Dan	Won	
2023	28th Shanghai Television Festival (Magnolia Awards)	Best Adapted Screenplay	Qidaojun, Qiu Yujie, Luo Suan & Huang Kaiwen	Nominated	
2023	35th Huading Awards	Best Screenplay	Qidaojun, Qiu Yujie, Luo Suan & Huang Kaiwen	Nominated	
2023	35th Huading Awards	Best Actress in a Contemporary Drama	Zhao Jinmai	Nominated	
2023	35th Huading Awards	Most Popular Actor in a Television Series	Bai Jingting	Nominated	
2023	35th Huading Awards	Best Supporting Actress	Liu Dan	Nominated	
2023	35th Huading Awards	Spotted Conch Award	Liu Dan	Nominated	
2023	China Television Director Committee Awards; New Horn Director's Night Awards	Director of the Year for a Television Series	Molong Sun, Hongyuan Liu & Lao Suan	Won	
2023	China Television Director Committee Awards; New Horn Director's Night Awards	Best Editing for a Television Series	Yijia Liu	Won	
2023	China Television Director Committee Awards; New Horn Director's Night Awards	Breakthrough Actress of the Year	Zhao Jinmai	Won	
2024	34th TV Drama Feitian Awards (Flying Apsaras)	Outstanding TV Series Award		Nominated	
