= Li Hongyi (actor) =

Chinese actor and singer

- Born: 26 June 1998 (age 28); Shenyang, Liaoning, China
- Education: Beijing Contemporary Music Academy
- Occupations: Actor, singer
- Years active: 2014–present
- Agent: Little Orchid Entertainment

Chinese name
- Simplified Chinese: 李宏毅
Transcriptions
Standard Mandarin
- Hanyu Pinyin: Lǐ Hóngyì

Li Hongyi (Chinese: 李宏毅, born 26 June 1998) is a Chinese actor and singer. He is best known for his roles in the dramas Master Devil Do Not Kiss Me (2017), My Love from the Ocean (2018), Love Better Than Immortality (2019), Prodigy Healer (2019), The Blood of Youth (2022–2023), and Wulin Heroes (2023).

== Early life and education ==
Li Hongyi was born on 26 June 1998 in Shenyang, Liaoning, China. He is a graduate of the Beijing Contemporary Music Academy.

Li was a former trainee of SM Entertainment. His training in South Korea was only for three months, but due to various reasons, he opted to resign and return to China to continue his studies.

== Career ==
=== 2014: Career beginnings ===
In 2014, Li made his acting debut in the sitcom Sister Knows. He was then cast in the fantasy web drama Intouchable.

=== 2016–present: Rising popularity ===
In 2016, Li made his big screen debut in the youth romance film Yesterday Once More. The low-budget film was a box office hit, and led to increased recognition for Li. In just three days, the box office has exceeded the 100 million yuan mark.

In 2017, Li played the lead role in the romance comedy series Master Devil Do Not Kiss Me together with Xing Fei. The web drama was a hit and led to increased popularity for Li. The first season broke through 100 million views in 5 days, and the second season broke through in just 50 hours.

In 2018, Li starred in the fantasy romance web series My Love From the Ocean, breaking 100 million views in two days and in the sci-fi web drama 24 Hours.

In 2019, Li was cast in the fantasy period drama Prodigy Healer, and historical romance drama Love Better Than Immortality, both of which he co-starred with actress Zhao Lusi.

In 2020, Li starred in the workplace romance drama Parallel Love. The same year he was cast in the historical drama Winner Is King, adapted from the BL novel Sha Po Lang by Priest.

In 2022, Li starred in the hit wuxia drama The Blood of Youth. The show's popularity exceeded the 10,000 heat index on Youku, becoming the first Youku drama with a 10,000-point hit for the year 2023.

== Filmography ==
=== Film ===
Year	English title	Chinese title	Role	Ref.
2014	Meng You Ji	梦游记		
2016	Speed of the World	极速世界·战车	Dao Ba	
2016	Yesterday Once More	谁的青春不迷茫	Huang Tao	

=== Television series ===
Year	English title	Chinese title	Role	Ref.
2014	Sister Knows	学姐知道	Warm Guy	
2015	Call Me Handsome	我是男神	Suo Long	
2015	Intouchable	男神执事团	Mu Fangcheng	
2016	Meow	喵喵喵喵喵喵喵	Mai Xi	
2017	Master Devil Do Not Kiss Me	恶魔少爷别吻我	Han Qilu	
2017	Master Devil Do Not Kiss Me 2	恶魔少爷别吻我2	Han Qilu	
2018	My Love from the Ocean	来自海洋的你	Chi Lu	
2018	24 Hours	限定24小时	Li Xin	
2019	Prodigy Healer	青囊传	Mu Xingchen	
2019	Love Better Than Immortality	天雷一部之春花秋月	Shangguan Qiuyue	
2020	Parallel Love	时间倒数遇见你	Jiao Yang	
2021	The Coolest World	最酷的世界	Duan Chong	
2021	My Wonderful Roommate	我的奇妙室友	Li Xin	
2021	Heart of Loyalty	一片冰心在玉壶	Su Zui	
2022	The Legendary Life of Queen Lau	皇后刘黑胖	Duan Yunzhang	
2022–2023	The Blood of Youth	少年歌行	Xiao Se / Xiao Chuhe / Prince Yong'an	
2023	Wulin Heroes	武林有骄气	Bai Yue	
2024	Dashing Youth	少年白马醉春风	Xiao Yi / Late Emperor Tianwu	
2024	Duel of Shadows	黑白诀	Ren Leilei	
2025	Flying up without Disturb	勿扰飞升	Zhong Xi / Huan Zong	
2025	Treasure at Dawn	天书黎明	Fu Sheng	
TBA	The Fated General	霍去病	Zhao Ponu	
TBA	The Blood of Youth 2	少年歌行	Xiao Se / Xiao Chuhe / Prince Yong'an	
TBA	Hidden Shadow	烽影燃梅香	Chu Dingjiang	
TBA	Blossom in Darkness	十万狂花入梦来	Qi Fengyin	
Dropped	Winner Is King	杀破狼	Shen Yi / Ji Ping	

=== Television show ===
Year	English title	Chinese title	Role	Ref.
2017	I Want to Meet You	我想见到你	Cast member	

== Discography ==
Year	English title	Chinese title	Album	Notes
2014	"So Crazy"	—N/a	Speed of the World OST	with Li Minglin
2014	"Good Boy"	好男娃	—N/a	with Li Minglin
2014	"Love U"	—N/a	—N/a	with Li Minglin
2015	"Life"	生命	—N/a	
2015	"Untouchable Lover"	不可触摸的恋人	Intouchable OST	with Liu Zhihong, Zhang Ziwen, and Zheng Yecheng
2016	"Confusion of Youth"	青茫	Yesterday Once More OST	with Bai Jingting, Ding Guansen, and Zhao Wenlong
2016	"The Year I Grew Up"	当我长大那年	—N/a	with Li Minglin
2017	"Devil's Love"	恶魔的爱	Master Devil Do Not Kiss Me OST	
2017	"Unique"	独特	Master Devil Do Not Kiss Me OST	with Li Minglin
2017	"I Want to See You"	我想见到你	—N/a	with Li Minglin
2018	"19 Years Old"	19岁	—N/a	
2018	"You Who Came from the Ocean"	来自海洋的你	My Love from the Ocean OST	with Teresa Tseng
2018	"I Love You"	—N/a	My Love from the Ocean OST	
2018	"Planet"	星球	My Love from the Ocean OST	
2019	"Legend of Qing Nang"	青囊传	Prodigy Healer OST	
2019	"The Moment Not Completed"	未完成的瞬间	Love Better Than Immortality OST	
2020	"Counting Down to the Time I Meet You"	时间倒数遇见你	Parallel Love OST	
2021	"Initial Me"	最初自我	The Coolest World OST	
2022	"Heartbeat Frequency"	心跳的频率	The Legendary Life of Queen Lau OST	with La Mu Yang Zi
2023	"Waiting"	守候	Wulin Heroes OST	

== Awards ==
Year	Award	Category	Nominee / Work	Result	Ref.
2016	iFensi Award Ceremony	Popular Artist Award	—N/a	Won	
2017	11th Tencent Video Star Awards	Most Promising Actor Award	Master Devil Do Not Kiss Me	Won	
