= Back In Time (Chinese TV series) =

2014 Chinese TV series

- Official Poster
- Also known as: Fleet of Time; Those Years in a Hurry
- Genre: Romance; Teen; Coming of age
- Based on: "Cong Cong Na Nian" by Jiu Ye Hui
- Written by: Jiu Ye Hui; Ding Jie Ru
- Directed by: Yao Tingting
- Starring: Yang Le; He Hongshan; Bai Jingting; Cai Wenjing; Du Weihan
- Ending theme: "All the Way" by: Bai Jingting; Yang Le; Du Weihan
- Country of origin: China
- Original language: Mandarin
- No. of episodes: 16

Production
- Producers: Shang Na; Zhu Zhen Hua
- Production location: China
- Running time: 50 minutes

Original release
- Network: Sohu
- Release: 4 August – 29 September 2014

Related
- Fleet of Time

Back In Time (Chinese: 匆匆那年) is a 2014 Chinese television series based on the novel "Cong Cong Na Nian" by Jiu Ye Hui. The series stars newcomers Yang Le, He Hongshan, Bai Jingting, Cai Wenjing, and Du Weihan. On 4 August 2014, the television adaptation premiered on Sohu. The series depicts five classmates as they navigate love, friendship, and the challenges of maturing. The film version Fleet of Time was released in Beijing on 30 July 2014.

== Plot ==
Chen Xun, Fang Hui, Qiao Ran, Lin Jiamo, and Zhao Ye are classmates at Experimental Middle School. They first crossed paths through a mix-up but soon became close friends. Chen Xun and Fang Hui develop a mutual crush, though Qiao Ran also harbors feelings for Fang Hui. Meanwhile, Zhao Ye likes Jiamo, but she is drawn to the captain of Zhao Ye’s basketball team. Eager to chase love, the five friends face the unexpected twists and turns of life. Despite promising to stay together forever, reality ultimately pulls them apart. Their shared memories remain, lasting only as a part of their fleeting youth.

== Casts ==
Cast	Role	Note
Yang Le	Chen Xun	Handsome and an excellent student, popular on campus. He’s close to Qiao Ran and Zhao Ye.
He Hongshan	Fang Hui	Introverted and sensitive yet unwavering in love.
Bai Jingting	Qiao Ran	He has a kind, gentle personality and radiates warmth. He’s close to Chen Xun and Zhao Ye.
Cai Wenjing	Lin Jiamo	A transfer student with a bright demeanor. Carefree on the surface, but tender-hearted underneath.
Du Weihan	Zhao Ye	A loud, playful member of the basketball team. She’s close to Chen Xun and Qiao Ran.
Wu Yongliang	Zheng Xue	
Qin Yu	Chen Xiaotang	A graceful, talented law student admired by all
Wang Zheng	Su Kai	Outgoing and caring captain of Experimental High’s basketball team.
Su Xin	Song Ning	Chen Xun's laid-back yet devoted college roommate
Fang Wenqiang	Wang Senzhao	Chen Xun's sincere college roommate from Shandong.

== Soundtrack ==
Title	Artist	Ref.
All the Way	Bai Jingting, Yang Le, Du Weihan	
One Flower	Bai Jingting	
I Hope	Yang Le	
I Just Like Girls Like You	Du Weihan	

== Reception ==
The series has been praised for its well-crafted script, realistic characters, and impressive cinematography. It garnered over 400 million views within a month of its release.

== Awards and nominations ==
Year	Awards	Category	Results	Ref.
2014	Hengdian Film and Television Festival	Best Web Drama	Won	
2015	The 3rd China Online Audiovisual Conference	Outstanding Online Audiovisual Works (Online Drama Group)	Won	
