= Madame Tussauds Beijing =

Beijing branch of Madame Tussauds wax museum

Madame Tussauds Beijing (北京杜莎夫人蜡像馆) is the Beijing branch of Madame Tussauds wax museum. It is situated at No. 18, Pedestrian Street, Qianmen Avenue, an entertainment district in Beijing. Opened in 2014 (11 years ago), it is the third Madame Tussauds wax museum to open in China. It offers a mix of Chinese and western figures, from film stars to athletes and world leaders.

== Notable Figures ==
Chinese History	World Leaders	Movie Characters	Sports	Music Industry	Entertainment Industry	Movie Icons
Lao She	Elizabeth II	Anduin Lothar	David Beckham	Elvis Presley	Nicky Wu	Benedict Cumberbatch
Yang Liwei	The Prince of Wales	Durotan	Li Xiaopeng	Michael Jackson	Yang Lan	Johnny Depp
Mei Lanfang	The Princess of Wales		Lang Ping	Cui Jian	Liu Xiao Ling Tong	Leonardo DiCaprio
Hou Baolin	Barack Obama		Kobe Bryant	Lu Han	Yang Mi	Kate Winslet
	Vladimir Putin		Zhang Jike	Zhang Yixing	Leslie Cheung	Julia Roberts
	Donald Trump			Lady Gaga	Jackie Chan	Anne Hathaway
				Madonna	Deng Chao	Cameron Diaz
				Jay Chou	Liu Wen	
				Miley Cyrus	Yang Yang	
				Wang Leehom	Zhao Liying	
				Wong Ka Kui	Huang Xiaoming	
				Justin Bieber	Yang Zi	
				Taylor Swift	Bai Jingting	
				Wowkie Zhang	Michelle Yeoh	
				Freddie Mercury	Cecilia Cheung	
				Pharrell Williams	Zhang Songwen	
				Li Ronghao	Huang Bo	
				Shang Wenjie	Zhang Yishan	
					Gao Xiaosong	
					Tong Liya	
