= Cai Wenjing =

Chinese actress (born 1990)

Elvira Cai
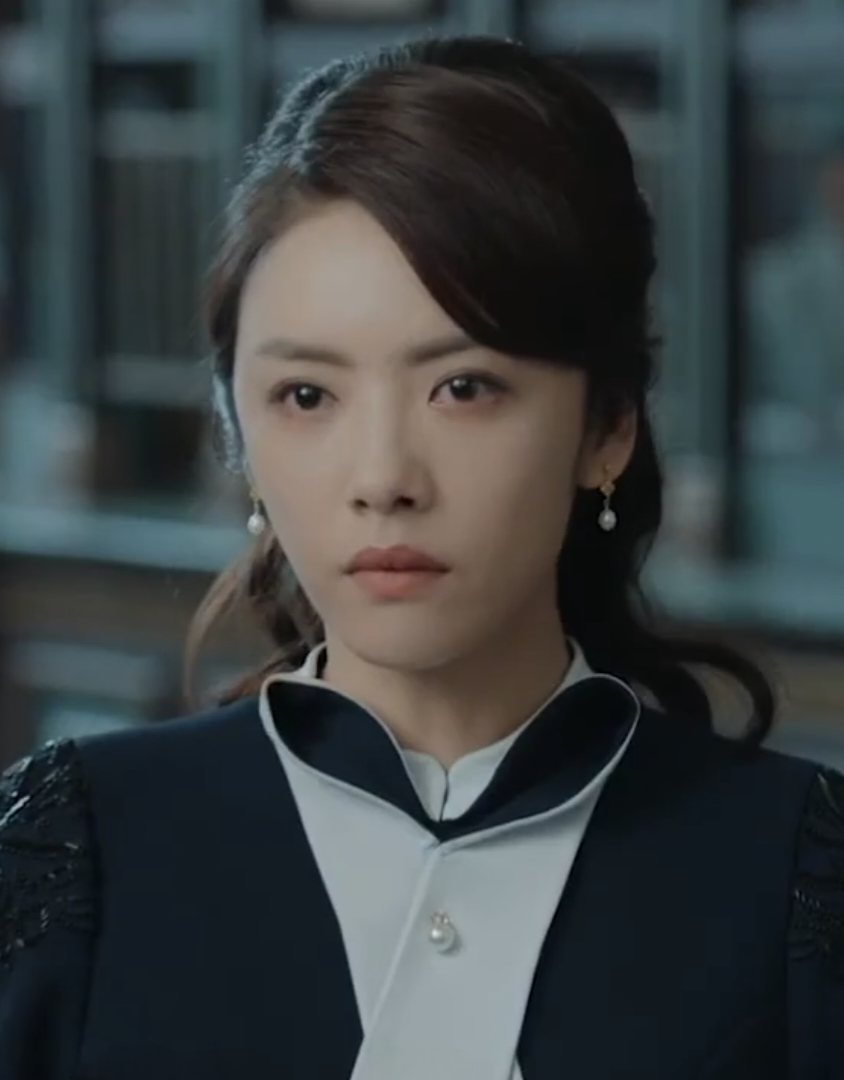
- Cai in The Justice (2021)
- Born: January 3, 1990 (age 36); Yichang, Hubei, China
- Other name: Elvira
- Education: Beijing Film Academy
- Occupation: Actress
- Years active: 2010–present
- Agent: M.young

Cai Wenjing (Chinese: 蔡文静; pinyin: Cài wénjìng, also known as Elvira; born 3 January 1990) is a Chinese actress.

== Career ==
In 2014, Cai became known for her role in the youth romance drama Back in Time.

In 2015, Cai starred alongside Vincent Zhao in the war drama Hero Doesn't Shed Tears.

In 2016, Cai played the female lead in the wuxia drama Bu Liang Ren, based on the manhua of the same title. She won the Most Popular Actress award at the Golden Guduo Media Awards. The same year she co-starred in the youth romance drama So Young, based on the novel of the same name by Xi Yiu.

In 2017, Cai starred in the medical romance suspense drama A Seven-Faced Man alongside Zhang Yishan. The same year, she starred in the romance comedy web drama My Girlfriend's Boyfriend. She won the Most Promising Actress award at the Tencent Video Star Awards.

In 2018, Cai starred alongside Chen Kun in the Republican spy drama Lost in 1949, The same year she starred in the period mystery drama Mystery of Antiques based on the novel of the same name by Ma Boyong.

Cai was cast in the romance drama Love is Always Online alongside Xiong Ziqi. She was confirmed to star in the romance suspense drama The Controllers.

In 2020, Cai starred alongside Huang Xiaoming in the workplace romance drama Game Changer. The same year, she starred in the historical fantasy drama Ling Long.

== Filmography ==
=== Film ===
Year	English title	Chinese title	Role	Notes/Ref.
2012	Yi Wen Lu	异闻录·窥	Jing Jing	Short film
2013	The party B and party A	乙方甲方		Short film
2013	Wedding Photos	嘻哈三部曲之婚纱照	Xiao Die	
2013	Another You	摘星的你	Ye Zi	
2019	The Great Detective	大侦探霍桑	Detective	
2019	Super Me	超级的我		Cameo

=== Television series ===
Year	English title	Chinese title	Role	Notes/Ref.
20-1	Kang Ri Qi Xia	抗日奇侠	Kong Yu'er	
2012	Love and Fate	情与缘	Zhang Xiaoping	
2013	Hip Hop Quartets	嘻哈四重奏	Xiao Mo	
2013	I Want To Be A Flight Attendant	我要当空姐	Zheng Wenwen	
2014	Fire Fighter	火线英雄	Tian Tian	
2014	Back in Time	匆匆那年	Lin Jiarong	
2014	Upside Down	倒过来看	Wang Po / Lin Daiyu / Hua Mulan	
2015	Dong Jiang Hero	东江英雄刘黑仔	Liu Jiamei	
2015	Invincible Tie Qiaosan	无敌铁桥三	An Qingluan	
2015	Hero Doesn't Shed Tears	英雄不流泪	Cheng Xiaoyan	
2015	Best Get Going	奔跑吧实习生	Zhou Gege	
2015	The Legendary Inn	传奇酒馆	Writer	
2016	So Young	致我们终将逝去的青春	Ruan Guan	
2016	Bu Liang Ren	画江湖之不良人	Ji Ruxue	
2017	Above The Clouds	云巅之上	Zuo Zuo	
2017	My Girlfriend's Boyfriend	我女朋友的男朋友	Pei Ni	
2017	A Seven-Faced Man	柒个我	Bai Xinxin	
2018	Lost in 1949	脱身	Fei Lina	
2018	Mystery of Antiques	古董局中局	Huang Yanyan	
2020	Miss S	旗袍美探	Xiao Juzi	Guest appearance
2021	The Controllers	掌中之物	He Yan	
2021	The Justice	光芒	Li Zi	
TBA	Love is Always Online	对的时间，对的人	Yao Yuan	
TBA	Ling Long	玲珑	Yin Zhuang	
TBA	Game Changer	危机先生	Xu Wenwen	

== Discography ==
=== Albums ===
Year	English title	Chinese title	Notes/Ref.
2010	"Love World Cup"	恋爱世界杯	

=== Singles ===
Year	English title	Chinese title	Album	Notes/Ref.
2010	"You Are Like The Wind"	你就像一阵风		
2017	"Fated in Life"	命中注定	My Girlfriend's Boyfriend OST	
2017	"I'm Chasing You"		A Seven-Faced Man OST	
2017	"Heart Ghost"	心鬼	A Seven-Faced Man OST	
2020	"Hand in Hand"	手足		Charity song for Coronavirus

== Awards and nominations ==
Year	Award	Category	Nominated work	Results	Ref.
2016	2nd Golden Guduo Media Awards	Most Popular Actress	Bu Liang Ren	Won	
2017	Tencent Video Star Awards.	Most Promising Actress	A Seven-Faced Man	Won	
