= Mobius (TV series) =

2025 Chinese TV series

- Also known as: Sleepless Days; Give Me Five
- Simplified Chinese: 不眠日
- Genre: Time travel; Science fiction; Detective; Supernatural; Action; Mystery; Thriller
- Based on: Ni Shi Zhen Cha Zu by Zhang Xiaomao
- Screenplay by: Bi Qiang; Jiang Wuji
- Directed by: Liu Zhangmu
- Starring: Bai Jingting; Janice Man; Song Yang; Liu Yijun; Zhang Bojia; Chutimon Chuengcharoensukying
- Country of origin: China
- Original languages: Mandarin; Cantonese
- No. of episodes: 16

Production
- Production locations: Guangdong; China; Hong Kong; Macau
- Running time: 45 minutes
- Production companies: Youhug Media; Leben Wenhua; iQIYI

Original release
- Network: iQIYI; Netflix
- Release: 17 September – 24 September 2025

Mobius (Chinese: 不眠日; pinyin: Bùmián Rì; lit. 'Sleepless Days') is a 2025 Chinese science fiction mystery thriller television series, starring Bai Jingting, Janice Man and Song Yang in the lead roles. It is adapted from Zhang Xiaomao's novel "Ni Shi Zhen Cha Zu” meaning 'Time Reversal Detective Squad'. On 17 September 2025, it was released on iQIYI and Netflix. On 18 September, it was released on Dragon TV. It centers on a detective who inadvertently acquires the supernatural quintuple time loop ability bound to a structured cycle, enabling him to relive the day up to five times to prevent crimes.

Mobius success exceeded expectations, driven by significant word of mouth and strong youth engagement. Within a week, it had surpassed 300 million views, and garnered about 9000 popularity index points on iQIYI. On Netflix, it was ranked among 'Top 10 Series' across South Asia; and globally ranked as '24th Most Watched Science Fiction Series'. It was ranked in the S+ Tier i.e. 'Top Performing Shows' on Yunhe Chart, and secured 1st place on 'Maoyan Suspense Drama Popularity'.

Upon release, Bai led the 'Top C-Drama Artists in the International Market', while his role as "Ding Qi" topped the 'Character Index List'.

== Plot ==
Detective Ding Qi accidentally gains the ability to time travel five times a day. These are not infinite loops, each cycle resets at midnight, and everyone loses all memory of previous iterations, except for a select few who retain all their memories. Ding Qi leverages the first four iterations to gather clues and evidence, enabling him to prevent crimes by the final loop. The plot intensifies when a cryptic murder warning surfaces from a suspect named "Squid". Ding Qi grows suspicious that "Squid" may also possess time loop abilities, given the changes in the subsequent loops. As the investigation deepens, it leads to a genetic biotechnology organization MOMA, where executives died one after another. Each clue may conceal a trap; each ally may harbor betrayal. Ding Qi's special ability makes him both invincible and fragile; each cycle tests his resolve and grants deeper insight into his powers. Thus begins an intense pursuit across time and space, as Ding Qi and his team race to gradually unravel the mystery that could alter their reality.

- Time Cycle Perceiver: A person who has full recollection of the previous four cycles.
- Ultimate Cycle Day: The 5th and final loop, the most challenging cycle due to the presence of others like Ding Qi, who retains their memories and continuously alter the course of events.
- Mobius Strip: Where the detective's pursuit and the villain's evasion spiral cyclically through cracks in time and space. Truth and deception become indistinguishable.

== Cast ==
Character	Cast	Notes
Ding Qi	Bai Jingting	CIB Detective from Section-4, with time and space travel ability.
An Lan	Janice Man	A genetic biologist/ researcher in MOMA Technology. Her mother got hospitalized in one of the loop. She's searching for Feng Wanqing. Studied medical from Ivy Bay University.
Mo Yuanzhi	Song Yang	Businessman & Scientist in MOMA Technology, major shareholder getting death threat by Squid. Yu Shiya's husband, childless for six years of marriage. Ivy Bay University is his alma mater. Mentee of Jiang Yuwen and an intern under Feng Wanqing.
Jiang Yuwen	Liu Yijun	Scientist in MOMA Technology, disappeared 8 years before. Doctoral mentor for Mo Yuanzhi.
Duan Zheng	Chen Baoyuan aka Ricky Chan	CIB Chief: Section-4. Senior of Ding Qi.
Yu Shiya	Zhang Bojia	Mo Yuanzhi's wife, childless for six years of marriage. Daughter of famed investor Yu Yinghua.
Han Yufei	Song Jiateng	Alcoholic Son of Han Song, a chief scientist and 2nd largest shareholder of MOMA, who was murdered by Squid.
Tang Xin	Cao Yangmingzhu	Research intern at MOMA Technology and daughter of Tang Shaorong, a chief scientist and 2nd largest shareholder of MOMA, who was murdered by Squid.
Maggie	Chutimon Chuengcharoensukying	Investor in MOMA, Represent venture capital firm 'Volly'.
Ye Kun/ Feng Qiming	Han Li	A stuntman and elder brother of Feng Wanqing.
Geng Zekai	Xia Minghao	Police Assistant in Section-4, assisting Ding Qi in MOMA murder case.
Fang Lu	Li Jingyun aka Gladys Li	New Police Assistant, 3 years in Section-4, assisting Ding Qi in MOMA murder case.
Yu Peishan	Luo Yan	Cybersecurity and Digital Forensics Specialist in Section-1, assisting Ding Qi in MOMA murder case.
Gu Song	Wang Yifei	Police officer in Section-1, assisting Ding Qi in MOMA murder case.
Wang Haoxin	Cai Xin	Police officer in Section-1, assisting Ding Qi in MOMA murder case.
Huang Yuan	Hu Jionglong	CIB Chief: Section-1. Senior of Yu Peishan and Gu Song.
Fu Jun	Tian Lei	A delivery guy. Former technician at MOMA, removed citing compliance breach.
Ren Jilong	Cheung Kwok Keung aka Zhang Guoqiang	CIB Senior Chief
You Yuxiang	Qian Yi	A researcher at Ivy Bay University and former assistant professor.
Han Song	Zhang Jianian aka Taibao	Father of Han Yufei, a scientist murdered by Squid.
Tang Shaorong	Tang Xu	Father of Tang Xin, a scientist murdered by Squid.
Feng Wanqing	Qian Ying	Scientist at MOMA, whose records are restricted, known to An Lan. Mo Yuanzhi was an intern under Feng Wanqing.
Tian	Li Erchen	Bridegroom in Zhao's family wedding.
	Liu Yilin	Bride, Zhao's daughter, a key investment partner in MOMA
	Wang Lei	Mo Yuanzhi's Secretary
Mrs. Cai	Xu Nannan	HR manager in MOMA
Student	Rong Zishan	A student at Ivy Bay University.
Mother	Gobby Wong	An Lan's mother
Dr. Chen	Louis Koo	Doctor in Tainyi Nursing Home.
Self	Xu Fangzhou	Guest appearance
Young Feng Qiming	Sheng Zi Hang	Guest appearance

== Soundtrack ==
On 16 September 2025, Bai Jingting (also a singer) and Chinese rock band Muma performed the live premiere of their song "FeiFei Run" at the 'Mimi Muma Concert'.

Title	Artist	Length	Ref.
Feifei Run	Muma Band & Bai Jingting	5:15	
5 Chances Save The World	Zang Binggan	2:32	
You Are The One	Xiao Mier	4:08	
Paradise	Journeyy Belton	2:58	

== Reception ==
In 2025, Mobius was acclaimed for integrating crime solving with a distinctive sci-fi premise and delivering an intense mystery. Its innovative use of 'Time-space Weapons' for both law enforcement and criminals marked a notable advancement in suspense dramas. It was a trending Netflix show, ranking 2nd in Taiwan, Hong Kong, Macao, and Singapore; 5th in Vietnam and Thailand; 7th in the Philippines, Malaysia and Japan; and 9th in South Korea and Indonesia.

Bai Jingting’s intense portrayal of the detective and the unrevealed role of Song Yang sparked curiosity. The series held 7.5 ratings on Douban from 60,000 viewers in two weeks. It topped iQIYI 'Hit Dramas Ranking', 'Top 5 Popular TV Series' list; and ranked 1st on 'Satellite TV Dramas Ranking' earning 2.15% viewership ratings.

=== Critics reviews ===
Gulf News praises stating that "Mobius is smart, stylish and savage. It twists into a perfect loop of crime, conspiracy and chaos. Bai Jingting carries the show, the time-loop mechanic stays fresh with clever variations, and the Cantonese Mandarin mix is a refreshing bonus". India Forums stated that "Mobius is worth a watch for viewers seeking drama with time loop concept. Blending sci-fi thriller and crime, it features engaging storytelling, solid performances, sleek action, comedy and suspense".

Netflix Junkie stated that "Mobius delivers a mind bending, edge of your seat thriller that keeps Netflix viewers captivated from start to finish, with its cyclical time twists and ever escalating suspense". Midgard Times rated 8/10 stating that "Mobius is an interesting time loop drama. The plot is unique, progresses efficiently through each loop, and features plenty of engaging action.

== Production ==
Mobius series is a joint production among iQIYI, Youhug Media and Leben Wenhua. In March 2025, the filming of the series was wrapped, which took place in Guangdong; the production utilized urban and industrial settings to reflect the story's modern and mysterious tone. Director Liu Zhangmu utilised illumination, contrast and color to effectively differentiate the progression of the time cycle. Certain scenes were set in Hong Kong and Macau, which required Bai Jingting to learn Cantonese for his role. The team incorporated Hong Kong style action and fight sequences into the series. Action director Zhang Peng, a veteran Hollywood stunt expert, expands traditional genres with an international perspective.

On 17 March 2025, the first trailer unveiled at the Hong Kong TV Festival. On 24 April 2025, the official trailer was showcased at the iQIYI World Conference. On 27 June 2025, the series received distribution licence to broadcast 16 episodes. A promotional exhibition took place, featuring a themed clock representing a time loop and an interactive wall for fans to engage. On 4 October 2025, it got released on TrueID, Thailand; on LiTV and Line TV, Taiwan.

== Ratings ==
Based on the average audience share per day (Yunhe Data), national online ranking based on Datawin charts.

- All episodes dropped on 24 September for VIPs Pass, finale was aired on 28 September for regular viewers.
- The Orange number represents the lowest ratings and the Blue number represents the highest ratings in China.

Day	Original Broadcast Date	Episode	Average Audience Share	OTT Ranking	National Ranking
1	September 17, 2025	1-5	6.6%	2	3
2	September 18, 2025	6-7	9.2%	2	3
3	September 19, 2025	8-9	10.0%	2	3
4	September 20, 2025	10-11	11.2%	2	3
5	September 21, 2025	12-13	11.6%	2	2
6	September 22, 2025	14	12.1%	2	2
7	September 23, 2025	15	12.7%	2	2
8	September 24, 2025	16	14.4%	2	2
Overall		11.0%			

== Awards and nominations ==
Year	Award	Category	Nominee	Result	Ref.
2025	Weibo TV & Internet Video Summit	Best Drama Actor	Bai Jingting	Nominated	
2025	Weibo TV & Internet Video Summit	Best Drama Character: Ding Qi	Bai Jingting	Nominated	
2025	Weibo TV & Internet Video Summit	Best Drama	Mobius	Won	
2025	iQIYI Scream Awards	Hall of Fame: Excellent Drama	Mobius	Listed	
2025	iQIYI Scream Awards	Annual Innovation Director	Liu Zhangmu	Won	
2025	Landmark TV Awards	Outstanding TV Series of the Year	Mobius	Won	
2025	Duomou Audience Choice Awards	Best Word-of-Mouth Drama	Mobius	Won	
2025	Comprehensive Survey on the Strength of Television and Online Audiovisual Media	Outstanding TV Series of the Year	Mobius	Won	
2025	Comprehensive Survey on the Strength of Television and Online Audiovisual Media	Best Lead Actor	Bai Jingting	Won	
2025	Comprehensive Survey on the Strength of Television and Online Audiovisual Media	Annual Innovation Director	Liu Zhangmu	Won	
2025	Comprehensive Survey on the Strength of Television and Online Audiovisual Media	Screenwriter	Bi Wei	Won	
2026	Golden Pufferfish Honorary Awards	Drama of the Year	Mobius	Won	
2026	Weibo Awards	Character of the Year: Ding Qi	Bai Jingting	Nominated	
2026	Weibo Awards	Most Influential Actor of the Year	Bai Jingting	Won	
2026	The Nation Broadcasting and Telecommunications Commission Awards	Quality Radio-TV Work of the Year	Mobius	Won	
2026	Shanghai International Communication of Chinese Culture	Outstanding Project	Mobius	Won	
2026	SMG TV Drama Quality Awards	Annual Quality and Powerful Drama Star	Bai Jingting	Won	
2026	SMG TV Drama Quality Awards	Quality Drama of the Year	Mobius	Won	
2026	SMG TV Drama Quality Awards	Quality Innovative Producer of the Year	Wang Xiaoyan	Won	
2026	33rd China TV Golden Eagle Awards	Quality Drama of the Year	Mobius	Nominated	
2026	Seoul International Drama Awards	Outstanding Drama Award: China	Mobius	Nominated	
2026	Seoul International Drama Awards	Outstanding Asian Star: China	Bai Jingting	Nominated	
