= Justifiable Defense =

2025 Chinese TV series

- Also known as: Self Defense
- Simplified Chinese: 正当防卫
- Genre: Crime; Law; Mystery; Thriller; Investigation
- Screenplay by: Jia Dongyan; Wu Yao
- Directed by: Li Yunliang
- Starring: Gao Ye; Zhang Luyi; Bai Jingting; Zhang Bojia; Ye Qing; Zhang Xinyi
- Country of origin: China
- Original language: Mandarin
- No. of episodes: 15

Production
- Producers: Dai Ying; Liang Keqing; Cao Lei
- Production location: China
- Running time: 45 minutes
- Production company: iQIYI

Original release
- Network: iQIYI; CMG; CCTV
- Release: 9 July – 15 July 2025

Justifiable Defense (Chinese: 正当防卫) is a 2025 Chinese crime and legal thriller series, starring Gao Ye, Zhang Luyi and Bai Jingting in the main roles. On 9 July 2025, it was released on iQIYI, China Media Group and China Central Television. The series juxtaposes a current murder case with an old 'Campus Over-Defense' case, where the prosecutor previously convicted a suspect, but now seeks to exonerate an accused in the ongoing investigation. It explores 'Article 20' of the Criminal Law of China, focusing on the law's ability to ensure individual security.

== Plot ==
Senior Prosecutor Duan Hongshan is handling a case where a woman killed her abusive husband and is seeking to prove her innocence. Young prosecutor Fang Lingyuan is assigned to assist the investigation. During the process, an old case resurfaces. They uncover a connection to an 'Excessive Self-defense' incident on campus involving Li Mufeng, Mei Zheng, and Jiang Ting, which Duan Hongshan handled fourteen years ago. At the time, Li Mufeng, a young student, was sentenced to four years in prison for killing a bully while trying to protect his senior. As the investigation progresses, ties to Li Mufeng are exposed. Guided by integrity, prosecutors navigate legal complexities, emotional challenges, and impartial law enforcement to reach a final resolution.

=== Article 20 of the Criminal Law ===
- Self Defence: A person acting in justifiable defense to stop an unlawful act is not criminally liable if the response is necessary and not clearly excessive.
- Excessive Defense: If the defense exceeds necessary limits and causes serious harm, the defender may be criminally liable, but penalties may be reduced or waived based on the circumstances.

== Cast ==
Character	Cast	Notes
Fang Lingyuan	Gao Ye	Young Prosecutor.
Duan Hongshan	Zhang Luyi	Senior Prosecutor, who handled 14 yrs old 'Campus Over-Defense' case.
Li Mufeng	Bai Jingting	Student charged in 'Campus Over-Defense', linked to current case.
Mei Zheng	Zhang Bojia	Senior student present during campus case, and witness in Jiang Ting case.
Jiang Ting	Ye Qing	Housewife who kills her abusive husband
Lei Shuang	Zhang Xinyi	Duan Hongshan's estranged wife
Duan Yingying	Zhang XiWei	Duan Hongshan's daughter
Ding Yi	Zeng Kelang	Duan Hongshan's assistant
Zhou Zheng	Zhou Wenyan	Fang Lingyuan's assistant
Zhou Delong	Chun Yu Shanshan	Father of the bullying student

== Reception ==
Justifiable Defense was one of 2025's most anticipated suspense dramas, appealing to viewers interested in crime and mystery thrillers. It earned strong word of mouth for its depth and intensity, garnering about 8000 popularity Index points on iQIYI and was ranked in the S+ Tier i.e. 'Top Performing Shows' on Yunhe Chart. It topped Beijing Satellite TV's prime time ratings in Q3 2025, with 1.98% average ratings, and emerging as a '2025 Summer Standout'. It attracted over 2M reservations on iQIYI before release. It sparked discussion for its dark tone and exploration of social issues such as domestic violence, school bullying and the coercion of public prejudice.

Zhang Luyi's composed demeanor, Gao Ye's perseverance and Bai Jingting's nuanced performance despite limited screen time were critically acclaimed.

== Production ==
It is produced by Beijing iQiyi Technology Co., Ltd., jointly produced by the Supreme People's Procuratorate Film and Television Center, Beijing Xingguang Guoyun Culture Technology Group Co., Ltd., Ciwen Media, Bodi Culture and China Film Co. Ltd. In October 2023, the production house announced that filming for the series had begun. Its production was completed at the end of 2023. In November 2024, its first teaser was released during iQIYI iJoy Conference held in Shanghai . Director Li Yunliang stated that the series provides the audience with a deeper understanding of "Self-Defense", exploring the complex issue of legitimate defense in depth.

The series was scheduled for release on iQIYI, CMG and CCTV. On 22 April 2025, it received distribution licence to broadcast 16 episodes. On 9 July 2025, after multiple delays, the series was finally released on iQIYI. The delay was due to a slot overlap with CCTV, since the drama was also arranged for satellite broadcast. The script was extensively reviewed with the Supreme People's Procuratorate Film and Television Center, owing to its sensitive topic and judicial issues involving the "legitimate defense" clause. It also got released on Beijing Television and Dragon TV.

== Ratings ==
Based on the average audience share per day (Yunhe Data); national online ranking based on Datawin and Maoyan Charts.

- All episodes dropped on 15 July for VIPs Pass, finale was aired on 17 July for regular viewers.
- The Orange number represents the lowest ratings and the Blue number represents the highest ratings in China.

Day	Original Broadcast Date	Episode	Average Audience Share	OTT Ranking China	National Ranking China
1	July 9, 2025	1-3	1.8%	5	12
2	July 10, 2025	4-5	4.6%	3	6
3	July 11, 2025	6-7	5.4%	3	6
4	July 12, 2025	8-9	7.0%	2	5
5	July 13, 2025	10-11	7.0%	2	6
6	July 14, 2025	12-13	7.1%	2	6
7	July 15, 2025	14-15	7.9%	2	6
Overall (Till 17 July)		6.1%			

== Awards and nominations ==
Year	Award	Category	Nominee	Result	Ref.
2025	Weibo TV & Internet Video Summit	Best Drama Actor	Bai Jingting	Nominated	
2025	Weibo TV & Internet Video Summit	Best Drama Character	Li Mufeng	Nominated	
2025	Weibo TV & Internet Video Summit	Best Drama Series	Justifiable Defense	Nominated	
2025	16th Macao International Television Festival; Golden Lotus Awards	Best Drama	Justifiable Defense	Nominated	
2025	16th Macao International Television Festival; Golden Lotus Awards	Best Actress	Gao Ye	Nominated	
2025	16th Macao International Television Festival; Golden Lotus Awards	Best Supporting Actress	Ye Qing	Nominated	
2026	Weibo Awards	Most Influential Actress of the Year	Gao Ye	Won	
2026	SMG TV Drama Quality Awards	Annual Quality and Powerful Drama Star	Bai Jingting	Won	
2026	Seoul International Drama Awards	Outstanding Drama Award: China	Justifiable Defence	Nominated	
