= Yesterday Once More (2016 film) =

2016 Chinese youth romance film

- Chinese: 谁的青春不迷茫
- Directed by: Yoyo Yao
- Based on: Yesterday Once More by Liu Tong
- Starring: Bai Jingting; Guo Shutong; Li Hongyi; Wang Herun; Ding Guansen; Zhao Wenlong
- Music by: Henry Lai
- Production company: Beijing Enlight Pictures
- Distributed by: Beijing Enlight Pictures
- Release date: April 22, 2016
- Running time: 105 minutes
- Country: China
- Language: Mandarin
- Box office: ¥ 180 Million

Yesterday Once More (Chinese: 谁的青春不迷茫) is a 2016 Chinese youth romance film directed by Yoyo Yao and starring Bai Jingting, Guo Shutong, Li Hongyi, Wang Herun, Ding Guansen and Zhao Wenlong. It is adapted from the Chinese novel of the same name by Liu Tong, and was released in China by Beijing Enlight Pictures on April 22, 2016. The film exceeded ¥100 Millions within three days of its release, maintained high ratings, and received critical acclaim.

== Plot ==
Top student Lin Tianjiao (Guo Shutong) cheats during a test and is caught by Gao Xiang (Bai Jingting), a rebellious classmate. When the note is discovered, Gao Xiang takes the blame. Grateful and guilty, Lin begins to befriend him. Meanwhile, her friend Lu Tiantian (Wang Herun) likes Ou Xiaoyang (Ding Guansen), but Lin dismisses him for his poor grades. Huang Tao (Li Hongyi) secretly likes Lin; therefore, he and his best friend, Li Tao (Zhao Wenlong), oppose Gao Xiang.

As Lin and Gao Xiang grow closer, he plans a date to an Astronomy Exhibition, but her strict mother stops her from going. Gao Xiang sneaks in to take photos for her, gets caught, and is forced to leave school. Before leaving, Gao Xiang paints astronomical murals in their classroom. At the school awards, Lin wins top student but uses her speech to admit her mistakes and rushes to say goodbye to Gao Xiang. She misses meeting him at the station, but bids farewell through a radio broadcast by singing the Beatles' "Hey Jude".

Years later, Lin is a successful astronomer and plans to reunite with Gao Xiang in Africa. Her friends reunite at Huang Tao's wedding, with Lu Tiantian and Ou Xiaoyang still happily together. The story emphasizes personal growth over a clichéd romance, with a bittersweet, open-ended conclusion.

== Cast ==
- Bai Jingting as Gao Xiang
- Guo Shutong as Lin Tianjiao
- Li Hongyi as Huang Tao
- Wang Herun as Lu Tiantian
- Ding Guansen as Ou Xiaoyang
- Zhao Wenlong as Li Tao

Guest appearances

- Alec Su as Teacher Qian
- Hu Xianxu as Lin Ziao
- Liu Mintao as Tianjiao's Mother
- Liu Yan as Shop owner

== Soundtrack ==
Title	Artist/s	Ref.
Confusion of Youth	Bai Jingting; Li Hongyi; Ding Guansen; Zhao Wenlong	
Big-Headed Love	Ding Guansen	
Towards the Light	Xu Weizhou	
Never Say Goodby; Female Version	Xu Fei	
Never Say Goodbye; Male Version	Good Sister Band	

== Reception ==
The film received positive reviews for its nostalgic tone and strong performances, especially from Bai Jingting and Guo Shutong; critics noted its unique yet well-executed coming-of-age narrative. Its success reflects the film’s strong initial performance, driven by its appeal to young audiences and nostalgic themes.

== Awards and nominations ==
Year	Award	Category	Note	Status	Ref.
2016	13th Guangzhou Student Film Festival	Favorite Character: Gao Xiang	Bai Jingting	Won	
2017	NetEase Attitude Awards	Young Actor Award	Bai Jingting	Won	
2017	Shanghai Film Critics Awards	Best New Actor	Bai Jingting	Nominated	
