= He Hongshan =

Chinese actress and model

- 何泓姗
- Born: April 10, 1987 (age 39); Chongqing, China
- Other name: Viva He
- Education: Chongqing College of Humanities, Science & Technology
- Occupations: Actress, model
- Years active: 2008-present
- Agent: New Classics Media
- Notable work: Above The Clouds (2017); The Evolution of Our Love; Ruyi's Royal Love in the Palace
- Modeling information
- Height: 163 cm (64 in)
- Hair color: Black
- Eye color: Black
- Website: weibo.com/vivahe

He Hongshan (Chinese: 何泓姗; pinyin: Hé Hóngshān; born April 10, 1987), also known as Viva Ho, is a Chinese actress and model. She rose to prominence for her lead role in youth drama Back in Time, and subsequently appeared in a number of television series including Above The Clouds (2017), The Evolution of Our Love (2018) and Ruyi's Royal Love in the Palace (2018).

== Early life and education ==
She was born in Chongqing on April 10, 1987. She graduated from the Chongqing College of Humanities, Science & Technology.

== Acting career ==
In 2008, she made her film debut with a small role in Ah Qiang in the Street. She then got a small role in the biographical television series What a Big Tree (2009).

She remained relatively unknown, until she got the lead role in Back in Time (2014), a youth drama adapted from Jiuyehui's novel of the same title. Following the airing of the series, He gained recognition. He then co-starred in the romance television series The Third Name of Love, and joined the main cast of Under One Roof.

Her first main role in a movie came with the Easy Life (2016) based on the novel Riot in Chang'an City by Han Han. He then played one of the lead roles in the period drama Sisters.

She became widely known to audiences with the modern romance drama Above The Clouds (2017). That same year, she participated in The Liquidator, a suspense crime film directed by Xu Jizhou and based on the novel Evil Minds: City Light written by Lei Mi.

In 2018, She co-starred in the romance drama The Evolution of Our Love. She then played a key supporting role in the historical television series Ruyi's Royal Love in the Palace, which gained her more recognition.

In 2019, She starred as the female lead in the historical television series Legend of the Phoenix, alongside Xu Zhengxi. She was also cast in the role of Ah Zi in the wuxia television series Demi-Gods and Semi-Devils, based on the novel of the same title by Jin Yong.

He Hong Shan was noted for having portrayed a prominent number of villains during her career, so much so that some of her fans personally asked her to not take any more villainous roles in her future works.

== Filmography ==
=== Film ===
Year	English title	Chinese title	Role	Notes
2008	Ah Qiang in the Street	街上的阿强	Wanmeimao	
2010	Chongqing Blues	日照重庆	Shan Shan	
2012	Decrepit Dream	残梦	Young Meng Xiaolu	
2012	I Phone You	爱封了	Xiao Li	
2013		野草莓		
2013		墨色青春	Ding Xiang	
2013		吃吧		
2016	Easy Life	喜乐长安	Xi Le	
2017	The Liquidator	心理罪之城市之光	Qi Yuan	

=== Television series ===
Year	English title	Chinese title	Role	Notes
2009	What a Big Tree	好大一棵树	Xiao Mei	
2010	The Doctors	医者仁心	Reporter	
2011	Xinhai Revolution	辛亥革命	Ye Zhen	
2011		美丽错儿	Lan Yinmeng	
2011	Goddess of Mercy	新玉观音	Wang Qian	
2012	Foggy City	雾都	Zheng Xiaohong	
2012		零度较量	Yang Dan	
2013	Dear Baby	心肝宝贝	Li Nuannuan	
2014	Back in Time	匆匆那年	Fang Hui	Main role
2014	The Third Name of Love	绝爱	Zou Yue	
2014	Under One Roof	团圆饭	Song Xiaomei	Main role
2015	Cruel Romance	锦绣缘华丽冒险	Shen Meng	
2016	Sisters	姐妹姐妹	Song Yunong	Main role
2017	Above The Clouds	云巅之上	Shen Yan	
2017	The Avengers	烈火刀影	Tang Hancai	
2018	The Evolution of Our Love	爱情进化论	Qing Qing	
2018	Ruyi's Royal Love in the Palace	如懿传	Bai Ruiji	
2019	Legend of the Phoenix	凤弈	Ye Ningzhi	Main role
2020	My Best Friend's Story	流金岁月	Yuan Yuan	
2021	The Sword and the Brocade	锦心似玉	Qiao Lianfang	
2021	Jun Jiu Ling	君九龄	Chu Jiu Ling	Guest Role
2021	Demi-Gods and Semi-Devils	天龙八部	A'zi	
2021	Da Lang Tao Sha: Qi Hang	大浪淘沙：启航	Xu Quan Zhi	
2022	I Am a Superstar	超时空大玩家	Wang Xiao Mei	
TBA	Never Too Late	我的助理六十岁	Lin Xiao Xiao	
TBA	Blooming Days	岁岁青莲	Luo Qinglian	Main role
TBA	Zhao Ge	朝歌	[Host]	
TBA	Don't Be Fooled	不要再上当		Main role

== Awards and nominations ==
Year	Award	Category	Nominated work	Result	Ref.
2018	12th Tencent Video Star Awards	Breakthrough Actress Award	—N/a	Won	
2019	4th China Quality Television Drama Ceremony	Newcomer Award	—N/a	Won	
2019	Golden Bud - The Third Network Film And Television Festival	Most Promising Newcomer	Ruyi's Royal Love in the Palace	Won	
2019	Golden Bud - The Fourth Network Film And Television Festival	Best Actress	Legend of the Phoenix	Nominated	
