= A Seven-Faced Man =

- Drama poster
- Traditional Chinese: 柒個我
- Simplified Chinese: 柒个我
- Hanyu Pinyin: Qī Gè Wǒ
- Genre: Romance; Suspense
- Based on: Kill Me, Heal Me by Jin Soo-wan
- Written by: Ma Saike
- Directed by: Deng Ke
- Starring: Zhang Yishan; Cai Wenjing
- Opening theme: 柒个我 (Qi Ge Wo) by Liu Sha
- Ending theme: 枷锁 (Shackles) by Gao Ying
- Country of origin: China
- Original language: Mandarin
- No. of seasons: 1
- No. of episodes: 38

Production
- Executive producers: Zhang Na; Wang Wenqing
- Production locations: Shanghai, Kunshan
- Production company: Huace Media

Original release
- Network: Tencent Video
- Release: December 13, 2017 – January 18, 2018

A Seven-Faced Man (Chinese: 柒个我) is a 2017 Chinese streaming television series starring Zhang Yishan and Cai Wenjing. It is a remake of the 2015 South Korea television series Kill Me, Heal Me written by Jin Soo-wan. The series premiered on Tencent Video starting December 13, 2017.

== Synopsis ==
Shen Yizhen is a third generation of successors of Shenhua Group. He has multiple personalites. When he meets his psychiatrist Bai Xinxin, he falls in love with her.

== Cast ==
=== Main ===
- Zhang Yishan as Shen Yizhen

A 28-year-old postgraduate of a famous American university, the third generation successor of Shenhua Group. He is kindhearted and gentle, but certain traumatic events from his mysterious past cloud his everyday life.

Cui Haoyue: A vehement guy with a devil-may-care demeanor who appears when Shen Yizhen experiences violence. He is the only identity to have all of Shen Yizhen's childhood memories. His first love is Bai Xinxin.
Zhu Changjiang: A man with an affinity for building bombs and drinking alcohol. He is erratic and fun-loving.
Mo Xiaojun: An intelligent boy who is musically gifted, but often has suicidal thoughts.
Mo Xiaona: An extrovert and mischievous young girl who loves idols and shopping. She has a crush on Bai Xiangrong.

- Cai Wenjing as Bai Xinxin

An intern at a hospital in Shanghai who is quirky and optimistic. Although she has a carefree exterior, Bai Xinxin harbors a deep and dark secret.

- Zhang Xiaoqian as Bai Xiangrong

A famous mystery novelist. Bai Xinxin's brother.

- Gao Taiyu as Shen Dongjie

Shen Yizhen's cousin and rival, with both competing to inherit their family's company.

- Fan Meng as Su Wanyan

Shen Yizhen's first love.

=== Supporting ===
- Wu Mian as Wang Huizhen
- Li Youlin as Bai Tianzhen
- Yang Ping as He Meilan
- Wang Sen as Chang Boqian
- Cui Zhigang as Shen Che
- Zhang Shuangli as Shen Jinghong
- Wang Jinghua as Lu Yue
- Wei Zixin as Shen Chun
- Xu Rongzhen as Fan Qiuying

== Production ==
Principal photography started in Shanghai and Kunshan on February 16, 2017, and wrapped on May 30, 2017.

On August 26, 2016, the producers released posters on the China International Film & TV Programs Exhibition.

On November 29, 2017, the producers released a trailer and official posters.

=== Reception ===
The drama received positive reception. It attracted more than 100 million views on Tencent Video within a day of its premiere.

== Awards and nominations ==
Award	Category	Nominated work	Result	Ref.
24th Huading Awards	Best Actor (Modern Drama)	Zhang Yishan	Nominated	
