= List of schools in Huairou, Beijing =

This is a list of schools in Huairou District, Beijing.

== Secondary schools ==
- Beijing 101 Middle School Huairou Branch School (怀柔分校)
- Beijing City Huairou District Beihuai (North Huairou) School (北京市怀柔区怀北学校)
- Beijing City Huairou District Miaocheng School (北京市怀柔区庙城学校)
- Beijing City Huairou District Yanqi School (北京市怀柔区雁栖学校)
- Beijing City Huairou District No. 1 High School (北京市怀柔区第一中学)
- Beijing City Huairou District No. 2 High School (北京市怀柔区第二中学)
- Beijing City Huairou District No. 3 High School (北京市怀柔区第三中学)
- Beijing City Huairou District No. 4 High School (北京市怀柔区第四中学)
- Beijing City Huairou District No. 5 High School (北京市怀柔区第五中学)
- Beijing City Huairou District Baoshan High School (北京市怀柔区宝山中学)
- Beijing City Huairou District Beifang High School (北京市怀柔区北房中学)
- Beijing City Huairou District Bohai High School (北京市怀柔区渤海中学)
- Beijing City Huairou District Chuzhang Xiao Ying Manchu High School (北京市怀柔区长哨营满族中学)
- Beijing City Huairou District Jiuduhe High School (北京市怀柔区九渡河中学)
- Beijing City Huairou District Labagoumen Manchu High School (北京市怀柔区喇叭沟门满族中学)
- Beijing City Huairou District Qiaozi High School (北京市怀柔区桥梓中学)
- Beijing City Huairou District Shanghekou High School (北京市怀柔区汤河口中学)
- Beijing City Huairou District Yangsong High School (北京市怀柔区杨宋中学)
- Beijing City Huairou District Zhanggechang High School (北京市怀柔区张各长中学)
- Beijing City Huairou District Physical Education School (北京市怀柔区体育运动学校)
- Capital Normal University Affiliated Hongluo Temple High School (首都师范大学附属红螺寺中学)

== Primary schools ==
- Beijing City Huairou District Chawu Railway Primary School (北京市怀柔区茶坞铁路小学)
