= 618 shopping day =

Shopping promotional campaign begun by Chinese e-commerce company JD.com

618 shopping day is a shopping festival created by JD.com. The festival is celebrated annually on the 18th June (6th Month), hence the name '618'.

'618' is significant as is the date JD.com was founded by Liu Qiangdong on 18 June 1998. It was first started in 2010, as a competitor to the shopping festival launched by rival Taobao, Singles' Day (or Double 11 in Chinese).

In 2022, JD.com saw slower growth in the 618 shopping day event, due to slowing economic conditions and COVID-19 outbreaks in China.

== Adoption ==
Since its creation in 2010, June 18 has become the second largest shopping day in China after Singles' Day on November 11. Although originally created by JD.com, it has now been adopted by other platforms, including Taobao, Pinduoduo and others. The volume of sales rivals Black Friday in the US. In 2020, there were hundreds of billions of USD in sales occurring across multiple platforms. Massive volumes of sales have been reported in other years as well.

A number of foreign companies operating in China have also taken part in the festival and offered their own deals for June 18. In 2019, Apple sold 100 million CNY (about 15 million USD) of products within the first three minutes.

== Controversy ==
More than 50 book publishers issued joint statements on May 20, 2024, saying that they would not participate in the 618 shopping day because of aggressive pricing policies that required them to offer discounts of 20% to 30% on JD.com.

== Influence ==
The hot 618 not only injects momentum into the accelerated recovery of the consumer market, but also helps accelerate the transformation and upgrading of China's retail industry.

As of 2:00 pm on June 18, 2020, JD Supermarket's sales report not only reflects the booming trend of transactions on various platforms during this year's 618 shopping festival, but also reflects the huge potential of the Chinese consumer market.

The 618, which involves both online and offline participation, injects strong momentum into the accelerated recovery of the consumer market.

== Expand reading ==
1.Observing the 618 promotion: Consumption is gradually becoming more rational, and the integration of business formats is becoming the trend

2. Looking at the Consumer Recovery Behind the "6.18" Data
