= 2021 Xinjiang cotton boycott =

Consumer boycott in China

In March 2021, a consumer boycott started in China following statements by Western fashion brands such as H&M and Adidas announced that they would not use products or raw materials from Xinjiang due to reports and accusations of forced labor against Uyghurs. Many garment companies have also issued statements for similar reasons not to use raw materials or products from Xinjiang. Chinese state media, prominent Chinese celebrities and the Chinese public accused the West of malicious smearing and mobilized to support Xinjiang cotton and boycott those companies that abandoned Xinjiang cotton. The incident led some Chinese companies to withdraw from the Better Cotton Initiative (BCI) and sparked a boycott of foreign goods in China.

== Background ==
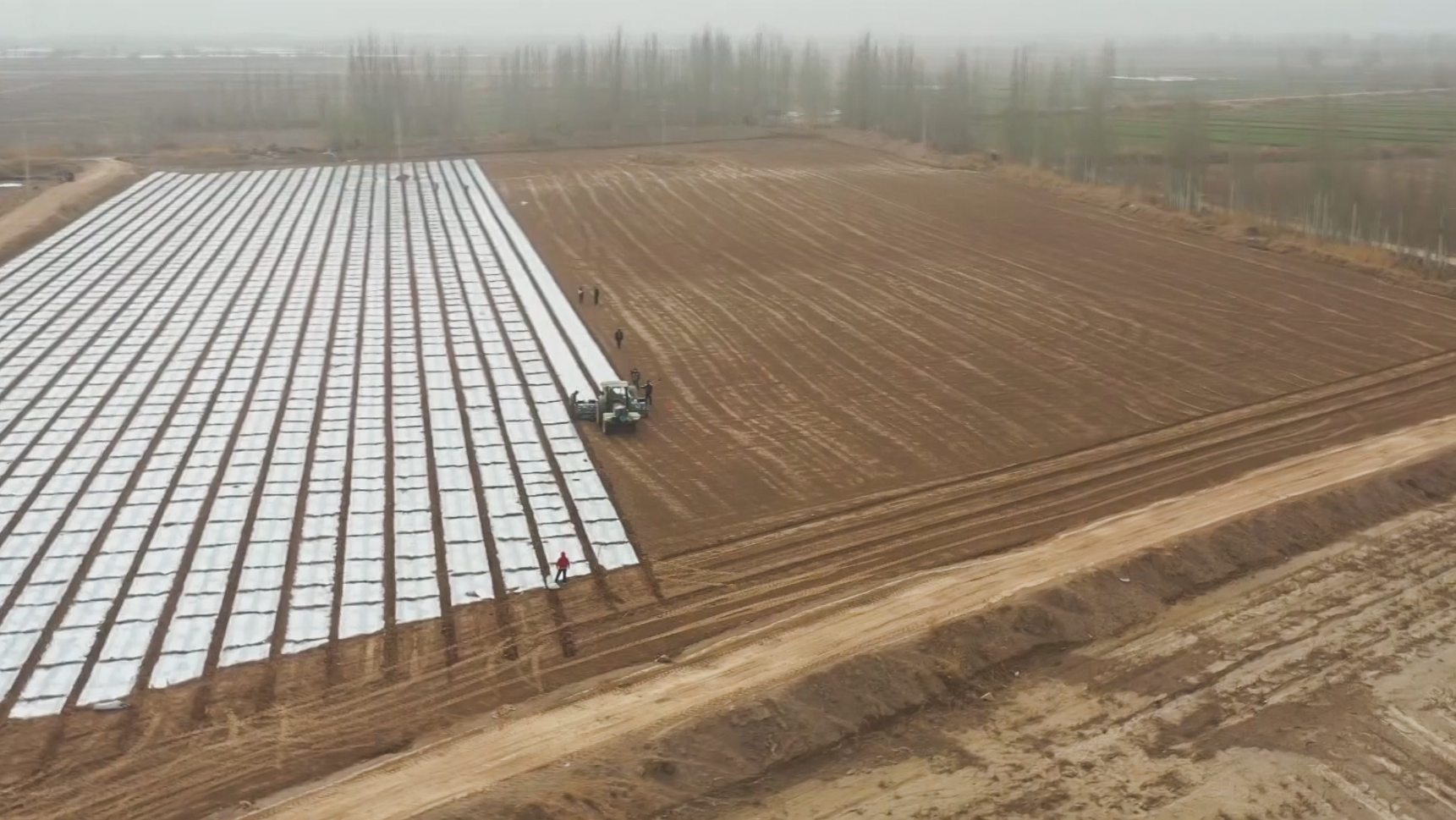
Aerial view of cotton spring planting in Yaha Town, Kuqa, Xinjiang

China is the world's largest cotton consumer and the second-largest cotton producer. Xinjiang is the main cotton producing area in China. As of 2020, Xinjiang's cotton production had exceeded 5 million tons, accounting for 87% of China's national output and 20% of the world's cotton production. The area of machine-harvested cotton accounted for 69.83% of the total cotton planting area. Every autumn, when cotton enters the harvesting season, the Xinjiang Railway Department runs special cotton trains to facilitate cotton pickers from inland provinces to enter Xinjiang for harvesting. The machine-harvested cotton business of the Xinjiang Production and Construction Corps began in 1996, when it mainly used cotton harvesters from the American brands John Deere and Case IH. Since 2018, cotton harvesters from China have been used in Xinjiang.

In July 2019, the Australian Broadcasting Corporation (ABC) investigative program The Four Corners reported that Uyghurs were arrested and forced to work in textile factories in Xinjiang. Subsequently, Cotton On Group and Target Australia launched an internal investigation into their supply chains and announced that they would no longer use cotton purchased by their Xinjiang subcontractors. On 1 March 2020, the Australian Strategic Policy Institute (ASPI) released a research report stating that about 83 well-known consumer brands, including Apple, Nike, Adidas, Uniqlo and Skechers, had suppliers who were linked to forced labor by Uyghurs and other ethnic minorities in China, with tens of thousands of Uyghurs being forced to migrate to various parts of China for work. In late March 2020, the British and Swiss-based Better Cotton Initiative (BCI) announced a suspension of its work in Xinjiang for the upcoming cotton season, halting the issuance of Good Cotton licenses in Xinjiang due to ongoing reports and allegations of forced labor in the region, and commissioning an external assessment of the situation in Xinjiang by experts, but promising to support farmers throughout the cotton season. On 21 October, BCI decided to cease all field activities in Xinjiang.

On 9 September 2020, Bloomberg News quoted a spokesperson as saying that H&M had no partnership with any garment factories in Xinjiang and was not currently sourcing any products from the region. The spokesperson also stated that measures had been taken to ensure that suppliers in China were not employing Xinjiang workers through relocation programs. On 16 September, H&M announced the termination of its relationship with a yarn supplier in China (Huafu Fashion) because the factory's products were suspected of being produced using "forced labor" from ethnic minorities in Xinjiang. In a statement released, H&M said it was "deeply concerned" about reports of "forced labor and discrimination against ethnic minorities in the Xinjiang Uyghur Autonomous Region" and stressed that it "does not partner with any garment manufacturing plants in Xinjiang and does not source products or raw materials from the region." On 22 September 2020, the United States Congress passed the Uyghur Forced Labor Prevention Act. Prior to this, some European and American media accused Xinjiang of forced labor.

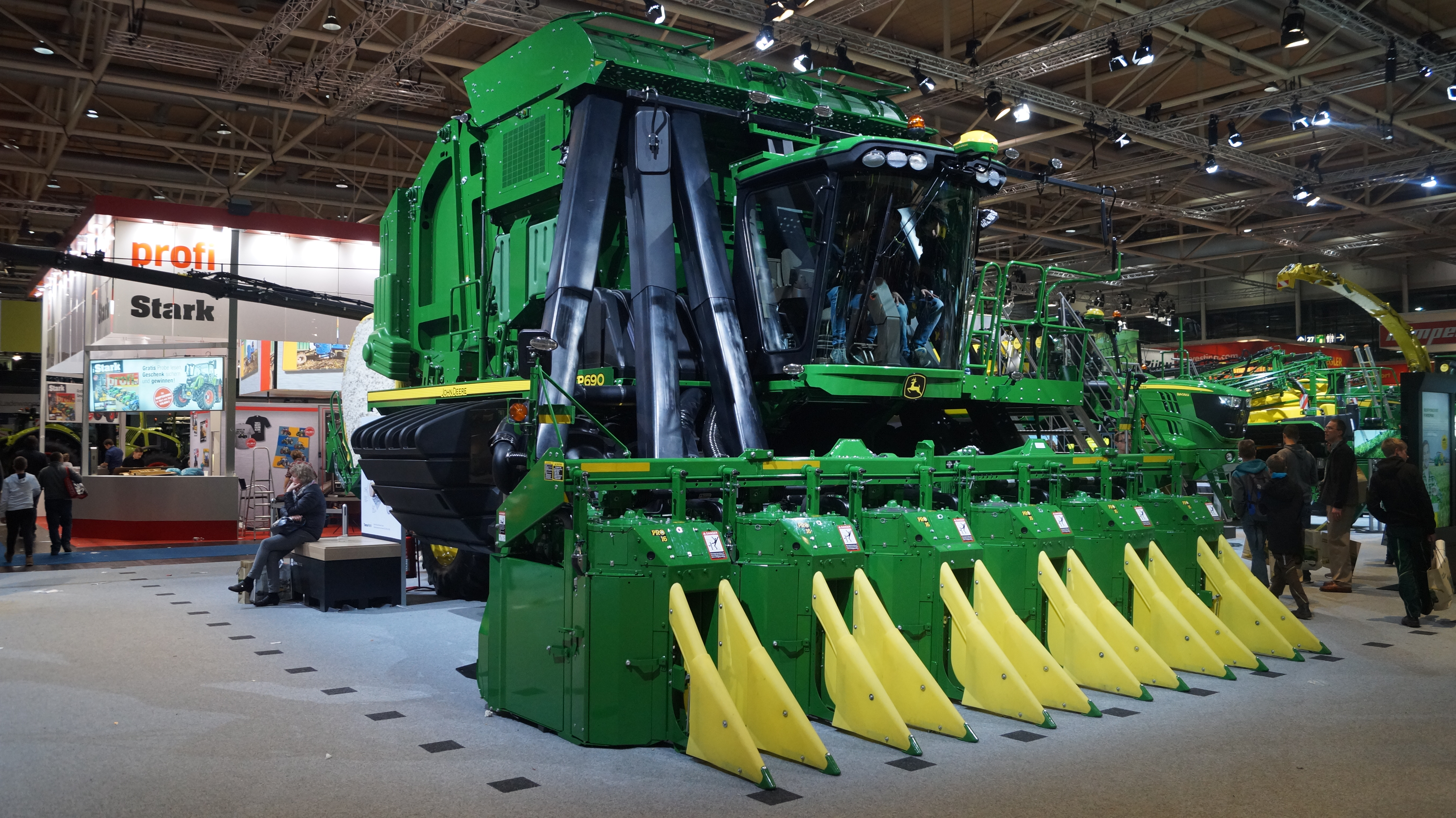
John Deere CP690 is one of the commonly used cotton harvester models in Xinjiang

On 14 December 2020, Adrian Zenz, a senior researcher at the Victims of Communism Memorial Foundation, conducted an investigation into cotton picking in Xinjiang and said that more than 500,000 ethnic minority workers are forced to go to the area to pick cotton every year under the government's mobilization. For example, on 8 October 2018, Aksu and Hotan regions sent 210,000 workers to cotton plantations under the Xinjiang Production and Construction Corps through "labor transfer". On 17 December 2020, the BBC News reported in a report titled "Xinjiang cotton pickers: New evidence reveals forced labor behind the fashion industry" that hundreds of thousands of Uyghurs and other ethnic minorities were engaged in hard manual labor in the vast cotton fields of Xinjiang and that hundreds of factories were built rapidly after 2018, many of which were located inside or near the walls of Xinjiang re-education camps. The report also stated: "Xinjiang's cotton industry has historically relied on seasonal migrant workers from other provinces of China. Although documents claim that wages can reach ¥5,000 renminbi ($764) per month, one report seems to indicate that the average monthly wage of 132 cotton pickers in a village organization is ¥1,670 renminbi ($255)."

On 22 March 2021, the European Union, the United Kingdom, the United States and Canada announced sanctions against Chinese officials for human rights violations by Uyghurs in Xinjiang. This was the first time sanctions had been imposed on China by the EU since the 1989 Tiananmen Square protests and massacre. The United Kingdom, the United States and Canada subsequently issued a joint statement stating that there was conclusive evidence of human rights violations by Chinese authorities in Xinjiang. Australia and New Zealand also issued a joint statement on the same day supporting the sanctions imposed by the EU, Canada, the United Kingdom and the United States.

== The boycott campaign ==
Starting in the early morning of 24 March 2021, information about H&M, Xinjiang cotton and the BCI label began to circulate on social networking sites such as Weibo and Douban. At 10:00 a.m. on 24 March, the Communist Youth League of China (CYLC) criticized a statement issued by H&M, a BCI member, in September 2020 on Weibo. H&M was accused of "deliberately finding fault with Xinjiang cotton" and "spreading rumors and boycotting Xinjiang cotton while making money? That's wishful thinking". The group stated in its statement that it "does not cooperate with any garment manufacturing factories located in Xinjiang, nor does it purchase products or raw materials from the region", which was considered a statement against China's accusations of forcing Uyghurs to work. H&M was boycotted by the Chinese state media and netizens in China on Chinese social networks. Some argue that H&M was not criticized when it issued a statement in September 2020 because the government of China did not want to affect the negotiations on the China–EU Comprehensive Agreement on Investment at that time.

=== Boycott of H&M ===
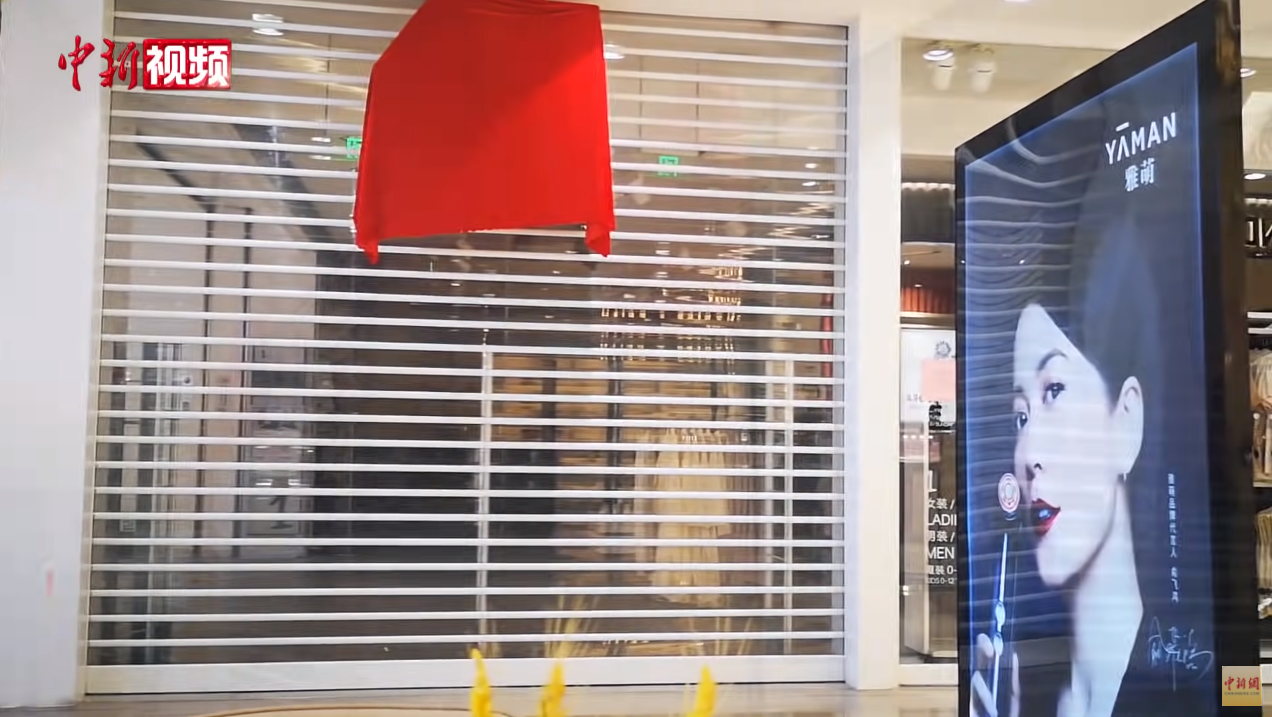
The H&M store in Xinjiang Huijia Times Department Store was closed, and the store sign was covered with a red cloth.

The studios of former H&M Greater China spokespeople Victoria Song and Huang Xuan, as well as Jackie Li, also issued statements on 24 March 2021, indicating that they had terminated their cooperation with H&M. Taobao, JD.com, Pinduoduo and other e-commerce platforms in China blocked H&M's store and related products a little later, while its official website in China was still operating. Chengdu Joy City removed the H&M trademark. In addition, Huijia Times Department Store in Ürümqi, Xinjiang, closed its H&M store and issued a statement demanding that H&M apologize to the people of Xinjiang. On the morning of 25 March, the staff of the Dezhou branch in Shandong suddenly closed the store and suspended business. Some stores that were not closed were even more affected by this incident, with few people. In Qingdao, Shandong, some real estate projects even used banners to state that they would not allow people wearing H&M products to visit, but they were criticized by many as being sensationalist. At the H&M store in Zhongyuan Wanda, Zhengzhou, Henan, a young woman held up a sign that read "I support Xinjiang cotton and boycott H&M" and tried to persuade and prevent customers from entering the store. She was eventually taken away by the police. According to a Bloomberg News report on 29 March, mall operators in second-tier cities such as Ürümqi, Yinchuan, Changchun and Lianyungang said that at least six stores have been closed by their owners. Chinese media reported more store closures, and many H&M brand billboards, such as those in Dazhou, Sichuan, Chongqing MixC store, and the H&M specialty store in Hohhot National Mall, Inner Mongolia, have been removed. It is understood that the closure of multiple H&M stores was the latest response to H&M's statement.

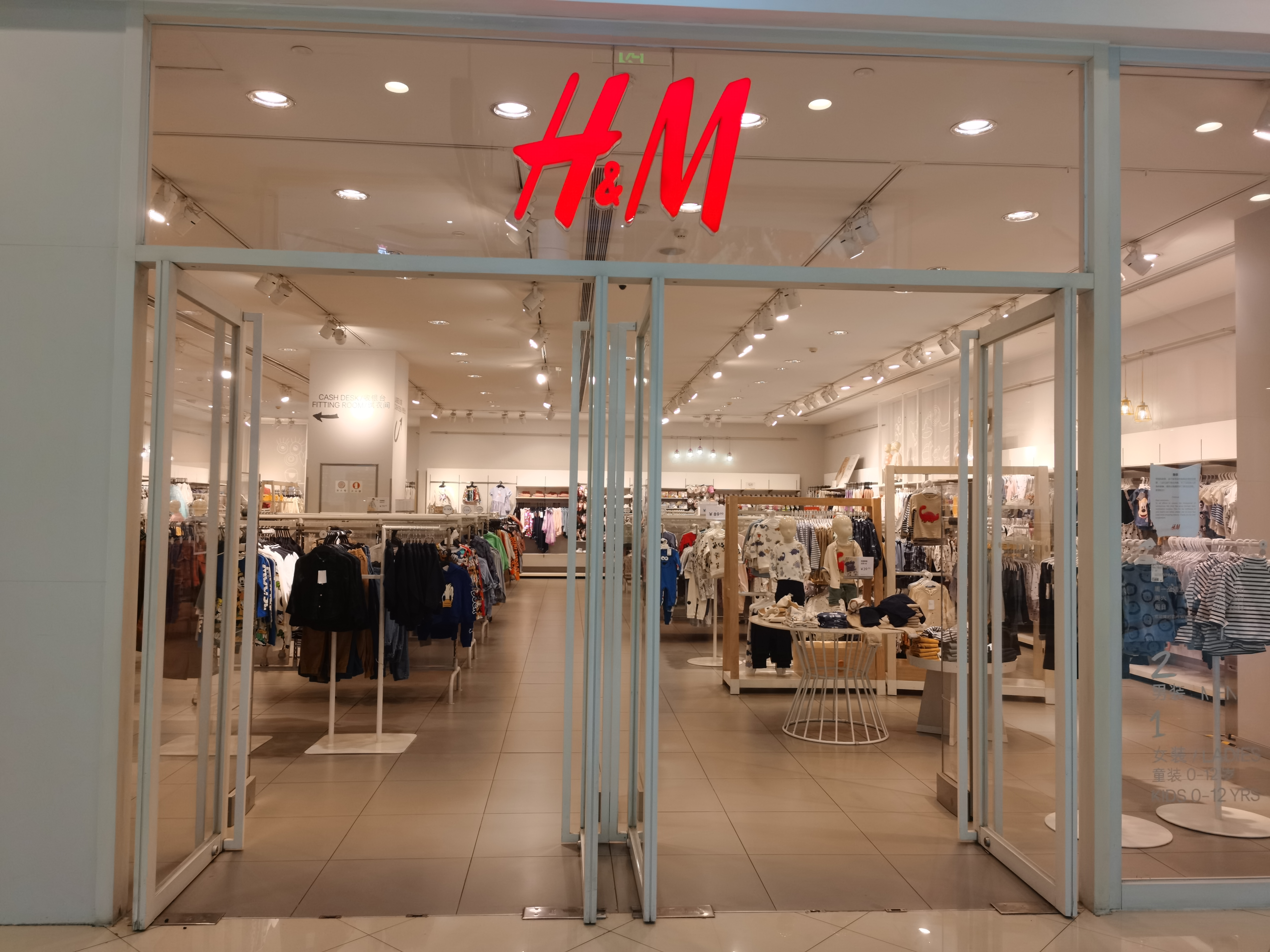
The H&M store located in Suzhou, Jiangsu, remained open after the incident, but customer traffic was sparse.

On 24 March 2021, H&M Group issued a statement saying that the group has always adhered to the principle of openness and transparency in managing its global supply chain, ensuring that suppliers around the world comply with its sustainable development commitments such as the OECD Code of Responsible Business Conduct, and does not represent any political stance. Subsequently, the People's Daily's Weibo account "People's Daily Commentary" stated that "Chinese netizens will not buy it" and emphasized that "national interests are above all else". On 31 March, H&M stated that the company's long-term commitment to the mainland Chinese market "remains firm" and that the company hopes to be a "responsible shopper, whether in mainland China or elsewhere in the world." It continued "Through working together with stakeholders and partners, we believe we can take action together to develop the fashion industry and serve customers and act in a respectful manner". However, this response did not mention Xinjiang and did not gain the approval of Chinese netizens. On 31 March 2021, the Helena Helmersson, the CEO of H&M, revealed that 20 stores in China had been closed. H&M was also blocked by e-commerce platforms such as Taobao and JD.com.

In July 2021, H&M announced its second fiscal quarter performance from March to May, revealing that the group's sales in mainland China fell by 28% to kr1.624 billion krona from kr2.259 billion krona during the same period last year. At the same time, as of the end of May, the number of the group's stores in China decreased by 13 to 489. Compared with H&M's other ten sales markets, China was the only region without sales growth. Moreover, before the boycott in the same period last year, China was H&M's third-largest region in terms of sales, second only to Germany and the United States, accounting for nearly 6% of the group's global market. In the last quarter, China's ranking in terms of the group's sales fell to sixth. In August 2021, H&M released its third quarterly performance, revealing that China had fallen out of the list of H&M's top ten markets, meaning that H&M Group's revenue in China in that quarter was no longer in the top ten. According to Bloomberg News, H&M's revenue in China in the third quarter of this year plummeted by about 40%, with a loss of more than ¥737 million renminbi. In response, H&M Group CEO Helena Helmersson declined to disclose the latest situation of H&M's business in China, only saying that H&M was boycotted after raising issues related to Xinjiang cotton, which was "a very complex situation". She later said in an interview: "Of course, it has been a challenging year. The more unpredictable world has taught me a lesson." She then stated that "while the Chinese market is very important, we will not apologize or resume using Xinjiang cotton."

==== Government reactions ====
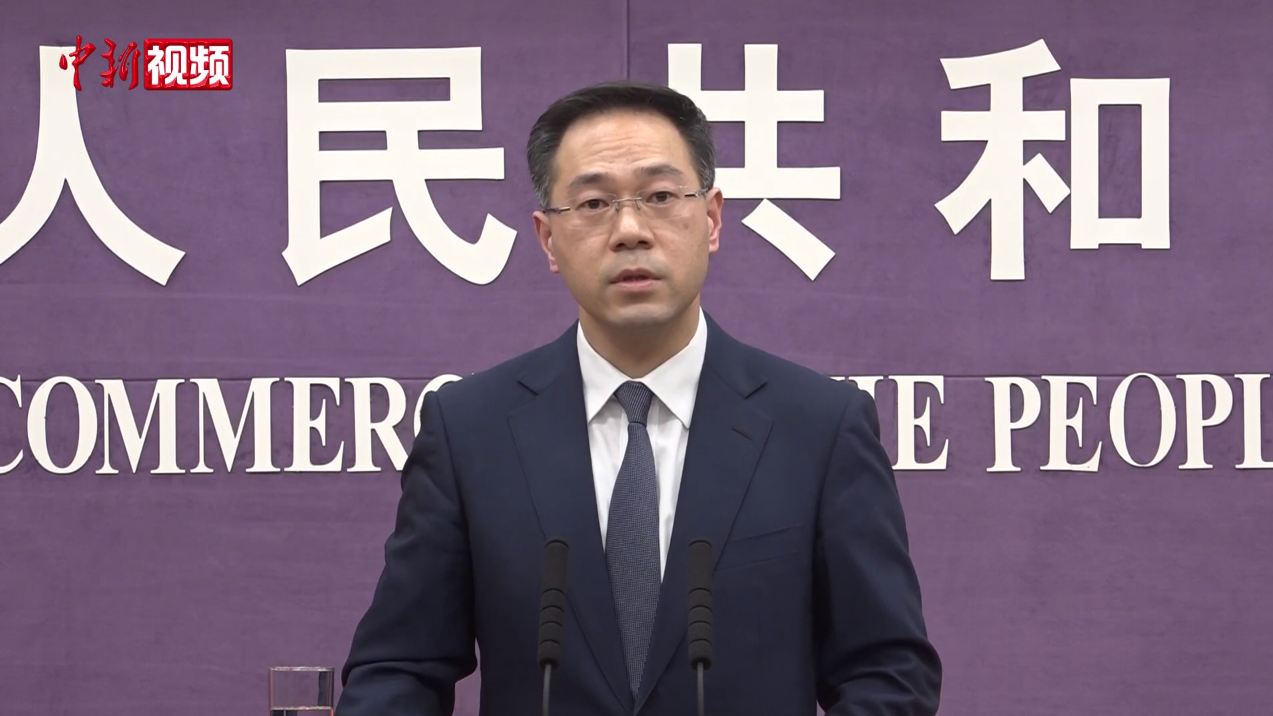
Ministry of Commerce spokesperson Gao Feng responding to the boycott of Xinjiang cotton by multinational companies such as H&M

On 25 March 2021, Gao Feng, spokesperson for the Ministry of Commerce, said that the existence of forced labor in Xinjiang was "completely unfounded" and that "the pure white Xinjiang cotton should not be smeared or tarnished by any force". On 25 March 2021, Hua Chunying, spokesperson for the Ministry of Foreign Affairs, responded to a question from a Bloomberg News reporter at a regular press conference, pointing out that cotton in Xinjiang is among the best in the world and that the accusations of "forced labor" in Xinjiang are malicious lies fabricated by individual anti-China forces with the aim of smearing the image of China and undermining the security and stability of Xinjiang. Hua concluded by saying, "China is upright and the Chinese people are friendly and open. But the will of the Chinese people cannot be deceived or violated." In response to an Agence France-Presse reporter's question about "forced labor," Hua said that "the accusations made by the United States and other individual Western countries against Xinjiang are based entirely on lies. These lies were first instigated by a few so-called scholars and media, and then some anti-China forces followed up with hype to spread rumors, slander and defame China. This is extremely wrong." Hua then showed photos that were allegedly taken by American slaves who were forced to pick cotton in cotton fields and claimed that more than 40% of cotton fields in Xinjiang had been mechanized for picking, thus countering Western public opinion." Newsweek reported after reviewing the materials that the photos of "black slaves" were taken in the 1960s and belonged to a series of photos taken by the artist Danny Lyon. At that time, Lyon was granted permission by the Texas Department of Prisons to photograph the lives of prisoners, including the hardships of their working conditions. Hua also said that China opposes "malicious attacks on China based on rumors and lies, and even damages China's interests" and that "the Chinese people will not allow foreigners to eat Chinese food while smashing Chinese bowls". In response to a question from a Reuters reporter, Hua said that "this is absolutely not nationalism, but simple patriotism.

Ministry of Foreign Affairs Spokesperson Hua Chunying responding to the boycott

On 29 March 2021, the Xinjiang Uygur Autonomous Region People's Government and the Ministry of Foreign Affairs jointly held a press conference on Xinjiang-related issues. At the press conference, Xu Guixiang, spokesperson of the Xinjiang Uygur Autonomous Region People's Government, said: "Enterprises should not politicize economic behavior. The Chinese people, including people of all ethnic groups in Xinjiang, have expressed their indignation at the sanctions imposed on relevant Chinese entities and individuals by external forces under the pretext of so-called Xinjiang human rights issues. China is no longer the China of 1840. The era when the Chinese people suffered from the hegemony and bullying of Western powers is gone forever. The Chinese people, including people of all ethnic groups in Xinjiang, are not to be trifled with. When the big stick of sanctions is wielded against Xinjiang enterprises, it will also hit themselves. As an international enterprise, we should see this. We hope that more companies like H&M will open their eyes and distinguish right from wrong." At the press conference, a female trainee who graduated from the vocational education and training center said: "Here I want to say to the rumor-mongers, you talk nonsense all day long and rely on defaming the reputation of our female trainees in the vocational education and training center to build your own ulterior motives. Don't you feel ashamed? Don't you have a conscience? Good deeds will be rewarded and evil deeds will be punished".

On 29 March 2021, Zhu Fenglian, spokesperson for the Taiwan Affairs Office, responded to the Democratic Progressive Party (DPP)'s accusations against H&M for refusing to use Xinjiang cotton. She said out the Xinjiang Uygur Autonomous Region fully implements the Chinese Communist Party (CCP)'s ethnic policies, resolutely implements the system of regional ethnic autonomy, and strives to promote the common unity, struggle, and common prosperity of all ethnic groups. She said anti-China forces fabricated rumors of so-called "forced labor" and "genocide" in order to smear the image of China, undermine the security and stability of Xinjiang, and hinder the development of China. She then denounced the DPP authorities for their clumsy performance in collusion with anti-China forces, believing that this once again fully exposed their consistent tricks of "malicious manipulation and attack and smear." Therefore, she appealed to the DPP, hoping that the DPP could pay attention to the water shortage problem in Taiwan and the issue of Taiwan's online army, and stop diverting attention.

On 30 March 2021, spokesperson Hua Chunying responded at a regular press conference to the public opinion that the boycott of foreign brands was "fueled" by the government. She said, "China has 1.4 billion people. Everyone has their own head and their own thoughts. Everyone also has the right to express their thoughts and feelings online. You can't assume that the Chinese government is demanding or instigating something just because you see some comments online that you don't like or don't want to hear. This is a serious misunderstanding and prejudice against China." "The right and wrong of this incident are very clear. The Chinese people and Chinese consumers have the right to make their own choices."

On 2 April 2021, the Shanghai Municipal Planning and Natural Resources Bureau and the Shanghai Internet Information Office summoned H&M (Shanghai) Commercial Co., Ltd., pointing out that there was a "problematic map of China" on the H&M official website and demanding that it be corrected immediately.

==== Reactions in Hong Kong ====
On 27 March 2021, Pun Kwok-shan, chairman of the Civil Force, and Dominic Lee, a member of the New People's Party, protested at H&M in Hong Kong, expressing their dissatisfaction with the brand's refusal to use Xinjiang cotton and calling on all Hong Kong citizens to boycott the brand. Dominic Lee said that "H&M has not made any accusations based on the actual situation in China. Its arrogant and ignorant attitude and its intention to deliberately smear the Chinese government's governance are obvious. Its behavior is absolutely unacceptable to any Chinese. I call on all Hong Kong citizens to boycott any products of the brand so as not to become accomplices to the enemy." Pun Kwok-shan said that H&M not only interfered with fair trade in the global commercial market, but also seriously damaged the international image of China. He said H&M followed the US anti-China policy and interfered with the governance of China and smeared the human rights situation with crude and unreasonable means. He called on H&M to apologize to Chinese people around the world and correct its mistakes. Pun Kwok-shan was found to be wearing Nike sneakers; he cited he wouldn't "cut them up" or "burn them" because it doesn't conform to environmental principles. Junius Ho, a member of the Hong Kong Legislative Council, said that the boycott of Xinjiang cotton is an escalation of the China–United States trade war into a full-scale struggle, and called on citizens to support the motherland and Xinjiang cotton.

On 28 March 2021, the pro-Beijing group Hong Kong Tongxin Association went to protest outside the H&M Tsim Sha Tsui Canton Road branch, shouting slogans such as "Hong Kong supports Xinjiang cotton, Xinjiang cotton is top-notch" and holding up banners such as "Chinese people don't buy this" and "Hong Kong supports Xinjiang cotton". In an interview with the media, the association criticized that "the allegations of forced labor in Xinjiang are completely unfounded and are lies fabricated by the United States and other Western countries in an attempt to suppress the Xinjiang cotton industry and the development of China's textile industry and to divide the feelings of Uyghur and Hui compatriots in Xinjiang." They also criticized that international brands such as H&M openly boycotted Xinjiang cotton, which they said violated international trade rules and was a bullying act. They demanded that H&M apologize. However, the protesters openly wore brands such as Puma and Adidas, which had already stated that they would not use Xinjiang cotton. One male protester wore Adidas sneakers, and another female protester wore what appeared to be an Adidas baseball cap, but covered the brand logo with Tongxin Association stickers. Due to the gathering ban, the protesters split into groups of four, holding up signs and chanting slogans. Police officers were on standby but did not intervene. The protest lasted for about 10 minutes before ending. Passersby and customers ignored the protest and continued to shop inside the store. The person in charge of the action, "Sister Hua," said that there were no other similar protests at the moment.

=== Support for Xinjiang cotton campaign ===
==== Business and industry ====
25 March 2021, Beijing residents: Support Xinjiang cotton; the opportunity should be seized to register a brand and promote it.

Taobao live streamer Li Jiaqi spoke out in support of Xinjiang cotton. He posted on Weibo that he would attend Shanghai Fashion Week in early April and hold a charity sale of Xinjiang long-staple cotton products to support Xinjiang cotton with practical actions and continue to promote public welfare and environmental protection projects. Live streamer Xin Youzhi, who was involved in the sale of fake bird's nest at the end of 2020, returned to live streaming on 27 March 2021. He mentioned the Xinjiang cotton incident in the live stream and said that there were several brands that boycotted Xinjiang cotton in the original live stream when he returned to live streaming, but after the team learned about the incident, they immediately removed the relevant products and put on domestic brands such as Li-Ning and Anta Sports to support Xinjiang cotton. Taobao livestream host Viya announced that she would remove brands from her livestream that opposed Xinjiang cotton, and said that she would decide whether to put them back on the shelves after clarifying the facts. On 26 March 2021, Viya opened a "Xinjiang long-staple cotton charity special" in her livestream room, recommending and selling Xinjiang cotton products to netizens. The charity livestream attracted about 12 million viewers in one hour and helped sell Xinjiang cotton products worth about ¥23.52 million renminbi. At the China Fashion Week press conference, Zhou Li, founder and design director of Sunbird Apparel Group, told Reuters, "As far as I'm concerned, I think Xinjiang cotton is my sweetheart, my love, which is to say I'm very grateful it has brought me such happiness." She then said that the clothes she showed on the runway were made entirely of Xinjiang cotton.

The China Cotton Association stated that it "opposes any restrictions imposed by the United States and other Western countries on the Xinjiang textile and apparel supply chain and related products, strongly urges them to stop their wrong practices, support Xinjiang cotton with action, and welcomes all parties in the global cotton textile industry chain to learn more about the real situation of the Xinjiang cotton industry through various means such as visiting Xinjiang and conducting third-party due diligence investigations, so as to jointly promote the improvement of the transparency of the industry chain and enhance understanding and mutual trust". Cao Huiqing, president of the Cotton Farmers Branch of the China Cotton Association, said in an interview with Chinese media that Xinjiang cotton does not lack orders, and even without the certification of the Better Cotton Initiative (BCI), it will not cause Xinjiang cotton to be unsalable. The China National Textile and Apparel Council expressed its agreement with the relevant positions of the Ministry of Foreign Affairs and the Ministry of Commerce and opposed any attempt to stigmatize Xinjiang cotton. It said that Xinjiang cotton is a globally recognized high-quality natural fiber raw material and an important raw material guarantee for the healthy and sustainable development of China's textile industry. It said that the so-called "forced labor" in Xinjiang is completely fabricated and is a complete lie and political manipulation. In the statement, the council thanked cotton growers and textile workers of all ethnic groups in Xinjiang for their long-term fundamental contributions to China's textile industry, thanked Chinese textile and apparel companies for their large amount of advanced investment in Xinjiang, and thanked many domestic brands and some international brands for their firm support of Xinjiang cotton in this incident. On 27 March, the China National Cotton Industry Alliance issued a statement, firmly opposing the stigmatization of Xinjiang cotton and stating that it will unite all member units and related brand enterprises to fully support and promote the green and sustainable development of Xinjiang cotton industry and enhance the international influence of China's own cotton brands.

On 29 March 2021, the Xinjiang Daily published a report titled "The Xinjiang Federation of Trade Unions, the Xinjiang Women's Federation, and the Xinjiang Cotton Association issued a statement that no force will be allowed to tarnish Xinjiang's pure white cotton." Xinjiang Federation of Trade Unions stated that Western anti-China forces "use human rights as a pretext to interfere in China's internal affairs and undermine Xinjiang's security and stability with sinister intentions," and indicated that Xinjiang cotton has achieved "mechanized, intelligent, and large-scale planting." The All-China Federation of Trade Unions also stated that the Xinjiang government "fully respects and protects the rights of ethnic minority employees to use their own languages and scripts, and employees can choose which language and script to use for communication. Enterprise trade union organizations fully respect the customs and habits of employees of all ethnic groups and provide halal meals for employees." The Xinjiang Uygur Autonomous Region Women's Federation stated, "The anti-China forces in the US and the West are fabricating a colossal lie under the pretext of so-called 'forced labor' to boycott Xinjiang cotton. Their attempt to undermine, smear, and stigmatize the stable, harmonious, and peaceful situation in Xinjiang is simply wishful thinking and a pipe dream!" The Federation expressed "strong indignation and resolute opposition" to the anti-China forces in the West led by the United States. The Women's Federation also stated that the Xinjiang cotton industry is an important way for Xinjiang women to increase their income and become wealthy, and many women have become rich and live a better life through cotton picking. Therefore, the Women's Federation called on "the anti-China forces in the US and the West to stop slandering and smearing Xinjiang." The Xinjiang Cotton Association stated that H&M and other companies "have no bottom line in business ethics and wantonly frame Xinjiang cotton, which is an ugly act that we strongly disapprove of and are extremely indignant about," and also called on "relevant brands and institutions to stop the wrong behavior of excluding Xinjiang cotton and its products from their own supply chains".

The China Consumers Association stated that "some international industry organizations and multinational corporations have boycotted cotton and related products from the Xinjiang Uygur Autonomous Region based on fabricated rumors, and have issued statements, terminated cooperation, and revoked licenses. This practice has seriously hurt the feelings of Chinese consumers and infringed upon their legitimate rights and interests. The China Consumers Association expresses serious concern about this matter and will closely monitor the development of related events to effectively protect the legitimate rights and interests of consumers". In addition, several Chinese brands, such as Erke, HLA Group, Meters/bonwe and Semir, expressed their support for Xinjiang cotton.

=== Expansion of the boycott ===
The boycott affected approximately two hundred brands, most of which had partnerships with Better Cotton Initiative:

- Nike
- Adidas
- Converse
- Puma
- Calvin Klein
- Uniqlo
- GU
- New Balance
- Burberry
- Zara
- Gap Inc.
- IKEA
- Tesco
- Decathlon
- Tommy Hilfiger
- Hugo Boss
- Asics
- Air Jordan
- Under Armour
- The North Face

As a result of this incident, the business operations and commercial cooperation of some companies that have cooperated with the BCI in China have been severely affected. For example, some netizens discovered an article titled "Nike statement on Xinjiang" published on Nike's English website before 2021, which stated that "we take seriously the reports of forced labor in the Xinjiang Uygur Autonomous Region. Nike does not use raw materials produced in the Xinjiang Uygur Autonomous Region for production and has confirmed with its suppliers to ensure that they will not provide us with textiles or yarns from the region." The website became inaccessible from mainland China. Nike also topped the Weibo hot search list. After the incident broke out, many artists in the Greater China region terminated their contracts with brands that refused to use Xinjiang cotton or had not yet made a statement.

After Adidas China boycotted Xinjiang cotton, Pop Mart requested an indefinite postponement of the launch of the co-branded products. Subsequently, Adidas China initiated arbitration proceedings. The arbitration committee ruled that Adidas China's boycott of Xinjiang cotton was merely a normal public opinion event and should not affect the performance of the contract between the two parties. Pop Mart was found to be in breach of contract, and the cooperation agreement between the two parties was terminated. Pop Mart was ordered to compensate Adidas China more than ¥16 million renminbi. Pop Mart was dissatisfied and appealed to the court. Ultimately, the court ruled to reject Pop Mart's relevant application.

==== Boycotts from the entertainment industry ====
A group of famous Uyghur artists from Xinjiang, including Dilraba Dilmurat, Gülnezer Bextiyar, Hankiz Omar, Madina Memet, Merxat Yalkun, rapper Air, dancer Gulimina Maimaiti, and Tong Liya (Sibe), also voiced their support for their hometown cotton through Weibo. On 28 March 2021, China Central Television (CCTV) and the short video platform Kuaishou launched a "live-streaming sales" event to promote Xinjiang cotton products. The live stream attracted more than 16 million views and generated more than ¥20 million renminbi in sales. The live stream was hosted by CCTV host of Uyghur ethnicity Neghmet Rakhman, in which artists Yu Menglong, Mary Ma, Jing Tian, and Baby Zhang participated. Neghmet said in the live stream: "Xinjiang cotton has a soft texture and a strong competitive edge, and it deserves a voice! Today I am not called Neghmet, I am called 'Neghmet Selling Cotton'. Let's work together to make Chinese cotton famous throughout the world." Yu Menglong from Ürümqi said: "Xinjiang cotton is of very high quality. I will not allow others to tarnish or smear it. The cotton in my hometown is very good!" Zhang Hongyuan, known as "Xinjiang Cotton Brother", said in the live stream that cotton is now harvested by mechanization and there is no such thing as "forced labor".

Hong Kong artists Eason Chan, Joey Yung, Jordan Chan, Kenny Bee, Wong Cho-lam, and Oscar Leung, and Taiwanese artists Show Lo, Chen Linong, Eddie Peng, Ouyang Nana, Ning Chang, Lai Kuan-lin, Greg Hsu, Huang An, and Liu Leyan all voiced their support for Xinjiang cotton on Weibo. Zeng Li, on the other hand, wore cotton while attending the Figaro Fashion Awards, expressing her support for Xinjiang cotton. Japanese actor Koji Yano forwarded the People's Daily's Weibo post on social media and added the hashtag "I support Xinjiang cotton". Many netizens rushed to the comment section to give him a thumbs up. He is the first artist outside China to speak out on the Xinjiang cotton issue. At 9 a.m. on 25 March 2021, the management company of Chinese artists Wang Yibo and Tan Songyun announced the termination of all cooperation with Nike. Zhao Jinmai Studio also terminated its cooperation with Nike. On the same afternoon, studios of Yang Mi, Dilraba Dilmurat, Jackson Yee, Deng Lun, Chen Linong, Jackson Wang, Peng Yuchang, Angelababy, Song Yanfei, Ning Chang, Eddie Peng, Zhao Lusi, and Eason Chan issued statements announcing the termination of all cooperation with Adidas. Liu Yifei's official Weibo account also posted a statement saying, "It has been confirmed that Ms. Liu Yifei has no cooperative relationship with the 'Adidas' brand."

Roy Wang's studio issued a statement saying that it had no cooperative relationship with the Uniqlo brand. Jing Boran and Ni Ni's studios subsequently stated that they had terminated their cooperation with the Uniqlo brand. Bai Jingting's studio, Ouyang Nana's studio, and Lay Zhang's studio respectively announced on Weibo that they had terminated their cooperation with the Converse brand. Lay Zhang's studio, Greg Hsu's company Heli Aurora, and Liu Yuxin's girl group The9's official Weibo account issued a statement announcing the termination of their cooperation with Calvin Klein. William Chan announced he would terminate all cooperation with Tommy Hilfiger. Li Xian, Yang Yang, Liu Haoran, Greg Hsu, and Liu Wen issued statements terminating all cooperation with the Puma brand. Song Weilong's agency, Huanyu Entertainment, and Zhou Dongyu's studio issued a statement announcing the termination of their cooperation with Burberry, as the brand has not yet clearly expressed its attitude and position. Tencent's Honor of Kings game has cancelled its collaboration with Burberry on the new skins "Yao" and "Spirit of Nature" and the "Spirit of the Forest" Star Legend skin.

Huang Zitao's studio issued a statement saying that his team had repeatedly asked Lacoste to make a formal public statement on its global social media platforms regarding the fact that the brand had never banned Xinjiang cotton, but the brand had not yet made a statement. Based on this, the studio announced the termination of its cooperation with Lacoste. Yuehua Entertainment, the company to which Meng Meiqi belongs, and Zhang Zifeng's studio issued a statement announcing the termination of their cooperation with New Balance. The companies of Li Yifeng, Zhu Zhengting and Lil Ghost successively issued statements announcing the termination of their cooperation with Hugo Boss. Chinese rapper Nineone said that she would remove the Puma brand's eponymous single and one of her signature works, "Puma", to support Xinjiang cotton with concrete actions. GAI directly forwarded "The Great Wall", a collaboration with Li-Ning, to express his support for domestic products. AR Liu Fuyang announced that he would release the 18th song in "phone project".

Xinjiang youth Li Yunzhi's rap song "You're Absurd" was released by the Xinjiang Communist Youth League on Bilibili, and had more than 317,000 views as of 28 March. The song title "You're Absurd" is a homophone of Nike, and "Absurd" is a homophone of H&M. The lyrics satirize the brand's reliance on the Chinese market and criticize foreign countries for "damaging interests, which is destroying so-called freedom". They also criticize the United States and the United Kingdom for enslaving black people and now using the banner of human rights. Another singer, "Jian-Ajian", released the song "Absurd" with the official media, which has more than one million views. The song satirizes foreign countries for making irresponsible remarks, and while adhering to political correctness, it also claims to uphold freedom of speech. The statement it issued is full of hidden meanings, and in fact, it just wants to "continue to play dumb to make money in China". Zhong Chuxi's studio issued a statement saying that her cooperation with Nike had expired and would not be renewed. Edison Chen's brand CLOT terminated its collaboration with Nike. Li Yifeng's studio issued a statement announcing the termination of its cooperation with Asics.

==== Other reactions ====
On 26 March 2021, Hong Kong politician Regina Ip posted that she had decided to stop using Burberry products. In her post, she said that Burberry was one of her favorite brands, especially its classic wool scarf, which was both beautiful and warm. She said based on the brand's false and unreasonable accusations against Xinjiang, she decided to immediately stop buying and using its products until they apologized or withdrew their accusations. Some netizens left messages asking if Regina would destroy the brand's products to express their dissatisfaction with the brand. Regina Ip responded on a radio program on the morning of 27 March 2021, saying that there was no need to deliberately destroy some existing products, and that her main purpose was to hope that the brand would retract its statement and apologize.

On 26 March 2021, two Uyghur girls living in Chongqing danced a Xinjiang Kazakh dance in front of the H&M store in Nanping, Chongqing, and distributed cotton to passersby. This unique way of protesting has attracted a lot of attention from the public. Some netizens jokingly suggested that "the Xinjiang uncle can grill lamb skewers at the door". The video also caused a stir on social media such as Weibo, Douyin, Kuaishou, and Bilibili.

On 27 March 2021, the Soccer News, a subsidiary of Guangzhou Daily, said that "although the two sides have a long-term business cooperation relationship, once it touches the national dignity and the overall situation of national unity, there is no room for detours." The report also revealed that the Chinese Football Association and the Professional League Preparatory Group had held an emergency internal meeting on the Xinjiang cotton incident, condemned Nike's behavior in the selection of raw materials for cotton procurement, and reserved the right to further deal with the contract. In view of the rise of nationalism, the team began to deal with the BCI corporate trademark. It is reported that in the daily training photos of the Shanghai Shenhua F.C. released on 25 March, the players' jerseys did not have the Nike logo. In the training photos of the Shanghai Harbor Club on the same day, the Nike logo on the jerseys had also "disappeared". On 26 March, in the report on the Shenzhen F.C.'s training of elite players across the country, the jersey picture with the Nike logo was also replaced.

In a restaurant in Chongqing, an employee used a Nike shirt to wipe the table. Real estate developments in Qingdao, Shandong, and shops in Inner Mongolia displayed signs prohibiting people wearing Nike clothing from entering. On 28 March 2021, some Chinese netizens discovered that the Swedish furniture brand IKEA had also joined the boycott of Xinjiang cotton. However, it was not noticed because it did not have a spokesperson. Netizens flocked to IKEA's Weibo to criticize it, threatening "no survivors". IKEA's official Weibo was flooded with comments from netizens. Originally, each post only had about 10 comments, but in the following days, there have been more than 100 comments under the posts, demanding that IKEA make a statement. On 29 March 2021, Huawei, Xiaomi and other brand mobile phone app stores have suspended the download service of Nike, Adidas and other apps. H&M was blocked by e-commerce platforms such as Taobao and JD.com.

==== Responses from the affected companies ====
On 24 March 2021, some netizens in China discovered that some of the products of Muji on various e-commerce platforms were labeled with "Xinjiang cotton". "Muji's survival instinct" became a hot search on Weibo that day. However, some netizens said that Muji's product titles have always been labeled with "Xinjiang cotton", and it is not because of this incident that they were suddenly labeled. The next day, Muji's China headquarters said, "We have not boycotted Xinjiang cotton, and our company is using Xinjiang cotton." Muji's Japanese parent company said that it was very concerned about the reports of forced labor in Xinjiang. The company said it inspected the Xinjiang factories that supplied the products and found no obvious problems. The company continued it would ensure that the products comply with the laws and regulations of the EU and the United States on human rights in Xinjiang. On 14 April 2021, Muji's parent company, Ryohin Keikaku Co., Ltd., issued another statement. Ryohin Keikaku President and Executive Director Matsuzaki Akira said that the company went to Xinjiang in 2020 to conduct an investigation and found no major violations of laws, regulations or codes of conduct. This statement was interpreted by the media as a statement that Muji would continue to purchase Xinjiang cotton. In July 2021, when Muji's parent company, Ryohin Keikaku, President and Executive Director Akira Matsuzaki was interviewed by the NHK, he said that every year a third-party organization would supervise and investigate the farms and other places where the cotton used to grow the company's products was grown. He said, "(According to the investigation results) no human rights violations were found, so we will continue to use it (Xinjiang cotton)." In addition, NHK also mentioned that in response to the investigation launched by France against four fashion companies, including Uniqlo France, for allegedly concealing so-called "forced labor" in Xinjiang, Akira Matsuzaki said that Muji had not received any investigation application from official agencies in Europe and the United States.

On 25 March 2021, German fashion brand Hugo Boss posted on Weibo that "Xinjiang long-staple cotton is one of the best cottons in the world" and "will continue to purchase and support Xinjiang cotton". However, on 27 March, the statement was withdrawn and a post was made on Weibo: "We value our long-term cooperative relationship with partners across China. Hugo Boss has not purchased any products directly from Xinjiang to date. Starting in October 2021, we will re-examine whether the new series meets global standards. In addition, in response to related accusations and reports, the company will ensure that products use only cotton or other materials that meet our values and standards." It also reiterated: "We are committed to respecting human rights, recognizing the basic values of the United Nations Universal Declaration of Human Rights and the core conventions of the International Labour Organization, and will never tolerate any form of forced or coerced labor. These standards apply to Hugo Boss's global suppliers."

On 25 March 2021, the Weibo account of the Asics posted that it would "continue to purchase and support Xinjiang cotton". The post was deleted on 29 March. According to the Australian Broadcasting Corporation, Asics's Japanese headquarters held an emergency meeting on 28 March and clarified that the statement was issued without authorization and did not represent the company's official position. It denied the statement on the official Weibo account on 25 March that supported Xinjiang cotton. "We now clarify that the problematic statement (on Weibo) was issued without authorization and does not represent the company's official position on this matter." "The Australian Olympic team's uniform does not contain cotton from Xinjiang, nor is it produced in this region."

On April 8, 2021, Fast Retailing (the parent company of Uniqlo) held a performance press conference. When asked by a reporter how he viewed the so-called "human rights issue" in Xinjiang, Uniqlo founder Tadashi Yanai said, "We monitor all factories and cotton production. Once we find a problem, we will stop cooperating with the other party. In addition, it is more of a political issue than a human rights issue." "Human rights are very important. As a company, we are doing what we can do and will not comment on other things." At the same time, when asked by reporters how he viewed the boycott of foreign companies that do not use Xinjiang cotton by Chinese consumers, Yanai said that he "maintained a neutral attitude". In November 2024, Yanai said in an interview with the BBC News that Uniqlo products do not use Xinjiang cotton.

On 1 March 2021, the BCI Shanghai Representative Office published a Chinese article titled "Important Statement on the Xinjiang Issue" on its WeChat official account, stating that "the BCI China project team strictly follows BCI's audit principles and has never found a single case of forced labor in the annual second-party credibility audits and third-party verifications conducted on the Xinjiang project sites since 2012." On 25 March, the International Financial News quoted the BCI Shanghai Representative Office as saying that the above statement only represents the views of the Shanghai Representative Office, and "BCI headquarters will also issue a statement, which is currently being handled." On the evening of 26 March, the BCI Shanghai Representative Office issued another statement, reiterating that "the annual second-party credibility audits and third-party verifications conducted on the Xinjiang project sites since 2012 have never found a single case of forced labor." On 27 March, CCTV News reported that the BCI Shanghai office had submitted two investigation reports to its Swiss headquarters, stating that "we have not found any cases of forced labor in China," but these reports were ignored, and the headquarters decided to indefinitely revoke the "Good Cotton" certification for Xinjiang cotton enterprises.

After inquiries by CGTN Europe, the Geneva office of the Better Cotton Initiative replied that the company is committed to promoting sustainable agriculture in all cotton-growing regions, including China, and to working with qualified local stakeholders to carry out field programs aimed at bringing positive, measurable change to the environment, the livelihoods and well-being of agricultural communities. However, the reply did not clearly mention the situation of "forced labor" in Xinjiang.

BCI is committed to promoting sustainable agriculture everywhere cotton is grown, including in China. In partnership with qualified local actors, we run field programs which aim to deliver positive, measurable change to the environment and to the livelihoods and wellbeing of farming communities.

The BCI official website also removed a statement that "human rights violations and forced labor exist in Xinjiang". On 15 April 2021, the Communist Youth League of China posted "[Your] face must hurt! BCI secretly removed a statement ‘boycotting Xinjiang cotton'" on Weibo. The China News Service called for the BCI to apologize. The BCI responded that the statement was removed due to a cyberattack and its policy remained unchanged.

==== Companies withdrawing from the BCI ====
Anta Sports, a Chinese sportswear company that was once a member of the organization, announced its withdrawal from the Better Cotton Initiative via Weibo on 24 March 2021. On 25 March, the textile and apparel sector of Chinese A-shares and Hong Kong stocks hit the daily limit. Some securities firms said that with announcement the announcement of Anta Sports of its withdrawal from BCI, more Chinese brands may continue to use Xinjiang cotton, which will stimulate the domestic market's enthusiasm for domestic products. On 25 March 2021, Fila China, a subsidiary of Anta Sports, posted on Weibo that the brand has been continuously purchasing and using cotton from cotton-producing areas in China, and mentioned that the company's silk-soft cotton products use cotton produced in Xinjiang. It has initiated relevant procedures to withdraw from the BCI. On 27 March 2021, Melco Resorts & Entertainment announced its withdrawal from the BCI. Melco stated that it will continue to implement its sustainable development strategy, including sustainable sourcing of cotton, in order to achieve carbon neutrality and zero waste by 2030.

== Reactions ==
=== China ===
==== Government ====
On 26 March 2021, the press conference of the Ministry of Foreign Affairs played a video involving Xinjiang for the first time, quoting a public speech by a subordinate of former US secretary of state Colin Powell, who accused the Central Intelligence Agency of instigating Uyghurs to create unrest and undermine China's stability. Foreign Ministry spokesperson Hua Chunying then said that "the United States and several Western allies have extended their black hands to Xinjiang's snow-white cotton, slandering the existence of forced labor and even genocide in Xinjiang," and reiterated that "China is not the Qing dynasty under the iron heel of the Eight-Nation Alliance. China is upright and honest, and the facts will pierce all the rumors against China."

On 26 March 2021, the People's Government of Xinjiang Uygur Autonomous Region and the Embassy of China in the United Kingdom held a special video promotion meeting for the United Kingdom on the theme of "Xinjiang is a good place" in Ürümqi, the capital of Xinjiang. In response to a question from Fang Wenjian, President of the China Chamber of Commerce in the UK, about "Xinjiang cotton", Li Xuejun, Deputy Secretary of the Party Group and Vice Chairman of the Standing Committee of the People's Congress of Xinjiang Uygur Autonomous Region, introduced that, given the good climate, Xinjiang is an important cotton producing area in China. He said that after years of development, Xinjiang cotton has become an important raw material for high-end textiles and clothing. He said cotton production in Xinjiang has long been highly mechanized, and that even during the busy harvest season, a large number of harvesting workers are not needed. It can be said that from the past to the present, Xinjiang has never had, nor does it need, to be forcibly mobilized for harvesting.

On 29 March 2021, Zhao Lijian, spokesperson for the Ministry of Foreign Affairs, responded to the US accusation that the boycott was "led by the Chinese government." Zhao Lijian said, "Some people in the United States not only stigmatize Xinjiang cotton, seriously damaging the cotton planting industry in Xinjiang and even the overall economic interests of China, but also attempt to separate the Chinese government from public opinion. How malicious their intentions are!" He continued "As far as I know, farmers can order machine picking services without leaving their homes through mobile phone apps. It can be said that cotton picking has entered the 'Internet+' era. At this time, a small group of countries and individuals are still fabricating stories of so-called 'forced labor.' Does this mean that they are forcing machines to work?" He continued, "Foreign companies refuse to use Xinjiang cotton based solely on lies. This is a living negative example. Of course, it will arouse the resentment and anger of the Chinese people. Does the government need to incite and guide this? For the Chinese people, these people's rumors and smears are the best patriotic education." Zhao Lijian also said, "Eating Chinese food while smashing Chinese pots, what kind of good thing is that? The Chinese market has always been open. We welcome foreign companies to invest and do business in China. We will always create a good environment for companies from all countries to invest in China. We also hope that relevant companies will operate legally and compliantly in China, and will not become tools of certain political forces, let alone challenge the will of the Chinese people."

On 30 March 2021, Hua Chunying, spokesperson for the Ministry of Foreign Affairs, responded to a Bloomberg News reporter's accusation that the United States was "inciting unrest in Xinjiang" and said, "The former chief of staff of US Secretary of State Colin Powell was the person who personally participated in the planning of the Iraq War. He admitted it himself, which at least shows that the US had a motive to do so." She said that the US's announcement of the withdrawal of the designation of the East Turkistan Islamic Movement as a terrorist organization was an obvious example, and quoted the content of a video by Canadian blogger Daniel Dunbrill, saying that "the US attempted to create unrest in Xinjiang and drag China down from within. When they found that their goal could not be achieved, they even smeared the white cotton. "

On 30 March 2021, Xu Guixiang, spokesperson for the Xinjiang Uygur Autonomous Region People's Government, said at a press conference that enterprises should not politicize economic behavior. He said that these enterprises were influenced by rumors and blindly believed that there was "forced labor" in the Xinjiang cotton industry. He suggested that they consider the basis, purpose and significance of sanctions. "While the big stick of sanctions is wielded against other countries, it will also hit its own head. It is harmful to others and not beneficial to oneself." Xu Guixiang further stated, "China's countermeasures are legitimate, reasonable and appropriate, and there is nothing to criticize. We also hope that more enterprises will open their eyes and distinguish right from wrong. Of course, some enterprises have expressed their attitude of continuing to cooperate, and we appreciate this. When responding to a reporter's question, Ilijan Anayiti, spokesperson for the Xinjiang Uygur Autonomous Region People's Government, said, "Cotton is white, but some people's hearts are black." Ilijan Anayiti concluded, "We welcome enterprises from all countries to visit the cotton producing areas and cotton textile enterprises in Xinjiang, talk with cotton farmers and cotton textile workers, and make wise choices." In response to the unilateral sanctions imposed by the EU, the US, the UK, and Canada on individuals and entities in Xinjiang under the pretext of the so-called "Xinjiang human rights" issue, Xu Guixiang responded at a press conference, saying that they collectively "lose the law, lose the reason, lose the memory, and lose their minds".

On 1 April 2021, the China Cotton Association issued a statement, "We firmly oppose any restrictions imposed by the United States and other Western countries on the Xinjiang textile and garment supply chain and related products, and strongly urge them to stop their wrong practices." The association also stated that it would support inviting foreign industry associations, brand owners and third-party institutions to conduct research in Xinjiang. The association continued, "The China Cotton Association promotes a socially responsible, sustainable and high-quality cotton industry development model, will increase its extension to both ends of the cotton industry chain, introduce a third-party certification system, establish a full traceability platform, strengthen in-depth cooperation with all parties in the industry chain, expand the market share of 'China Cotton' certified products, and enhance the overall competitiveness of the 'China Cotton' industry." The "China Cotton" mark is a quality certification trademark registered by the China Cotton Association with the State Administration for Industry and Commerce in 2009. Its purpose is to promote the natural, comfortable and environmentally friendly characteristics of cotton, promote the improvement of cotton quality, and allow consumers in China and even the world to enjoy high-quality cotton products from China.

On 15 April 2021, South China Morning Post reoirted that Zhongnong Guoji, a cotton vertical service provider headquartered in Beijing, is planning to establish a Chinese version of BCI and has made great progress. The Chinese version of BCI may set up a company to handle daily affairs and hold various industry events. Preparations have been underway before the project was launched.

==== Media ====
On 26 March 2021, Hong Kong media quoted Hu Xijin, editor-in-chief of the Global Times, as posting multiple articles on Weibo, pointing out that when the ideological conflict between China and the West intensifies, it will inevitably become difficult for multinational companies to maneuver and balance between different markets. Hu Xijin said, "Chinese netizens have the right to expose the rude statements of these Western companies on Xinjiang affairs, and also have the right to express their anger." He said the reason why H&M angered Chinese netizens was that the brand's statement on the Xinjiang issue was too prominent and proactive, saying that this was the reaction that any consumer group would make when offended. Hu Xijin also believed that the condemnation of many foreign companies by Chinese netizens was not contradictory to China's expansion of opening up to the outside world, nor should it be defined as "political suppression." He continued "It should be seen as a market process, which is an unavoidable link for manufacturers and products to please consumers. Let the market rules determine the result of this collision."

When interviewed by the Global Times, some Chinese scholars believed that the government of China could include the BCI in the sanctions list in order to counter the BCI's ban on Xinjiang cotton. Zhu Ying, a professor of human rights law at Southwest University of Political Science and Law, said that China implemented sanctions in accordance with international law and international practice through proper procedures and principles. The decision-making body carried out planned and step-by-step sanctions against relevant personnel and entities that slandered Xinjiang based on changes and developments in the international situation. If the relevant countries, relevant institutions and relevant personnel still do not stop and continue to stage international farces, then China will continue to take further sanctions measures in the relevant fields. Li Haidong, a professor at the China Foreign Affairs University, said that the scope of China's sanctions this time has been expanded. In the past, it was government officials and members of Congress, but now it covers religious personnel. These so-called religious personnel are actually political instigators who use religion as a guise to cooperate with the US government in implementing the policy of containment against China. They have a great influence in the US policy and social fields. Their accusations against religious freedom in China cater to the US government's tastes on the one hand, and on the other hand, they in fact encourage other countries to take tough sanctions against China. They have played a role in promoting the Western society's large-scale encirclement and suppression of China on Xinjiang-related issues.

On 30 March 2021, the Global Times commented that the White House's condemnation of the Chinese government's media attacks on these companies was a further manipulation and incitement by the US government of the conflict between multinational corporations and the Chinese market. The commentary stated that the denunciation of Western companies involved in the boycott of Xinjiang cotton on Chinese social media was entirely spontaneous, and the Chinese government did not coerce any foreign companies into doing anything. Although the online denunciation was intense, no on-site destruction of stores of relevant foreign brands occurred throughout China. "In contrast, there was a lot of looting and vandalism during the Black Lives Matter movement in the United States. This gives us a glimpse into the nature of the protests by the Chinese public."

On 31 March 2021, H&M declared in a recent statement that its long-term commitment to the Chinese market "remains steadfast," that it hopes to be a "responsible buyer, whether in China or elsewhere in the world," and that it is "committed to regaining the trust and confidence of Chinese consumers, colleagues, and business partners." CCTV published an article that day criticizing H&M's nearly 500-word statement as being hesitant, evasive, and circumventing the issue, essentially a second-rate public relations document full of empty talk and lacking sincerity. "Why doesn't H&M apologize to consumers openly? Recently, these foreign brands have followed suit in manipulating the Xinjiang issue. Since they are willing to believe lies and distort the truth, they should accept the response from Chinese consumers." CCTV's commentary also stated that if they really want to regain trust and retain the market, they must show sincerity and "have a stance and express an attitude on the key issues that they themselves have stirred up. Wrong is wrong, why be hesitant? Please be less manipulative and more sincere!"

==== Public reactions ====
On 25 March 2021, the Skechers brand sparked heated discussions on the Chinese internet and became a trending topic on Weibo. After seeing Australian Strategic Policy Institute's report on Xinjiang, the brand independently conducted two rounds of investigations on its suppliers in China, one in June 2020 and the other in December 2020. Its investigation report stated that "the main objective of these investigations was to examine the status of local laborers, specifically to ensure that no factories employed child labor or forced labor." While a large number of netizens boycotted Nike, Nike's transaction volume on the Dewu platform initially increased instead of decreasing. On 25 March, someone on the Hupu Sports platform launched a poll titled "If Nike's high-end shoes were to drop in price in a while, would you buy them?" 45.1% said they would buy them, 37.9% chose not to buy them, and 17.1% chose to wait and see. Bai Jingting was supposed to fly from Haikou to Beijing on 25 March 2021, but missed his flight due to dealing with matters related to terminating his contract with Converse. Some netizens said that the Haikou Meilan International Airport broadcast urged Bai Jingting to board the plane at 4:32 pm (8 minutes before Bai Jingting's studio released the termination statement).

On the Internet, the online store customer service staff and anchors of the boycotted brands in China were subjected to a lot of insults and abuse from netizens, which put the staff in an awkward position but they had no choice but to continue working. Some netizens expressed sympathy for the anchors being verbally attacked. "CCTV Youth" posted on Weibo to suggest "rational patriotism", not to attack and insult the brand store staff, not to blame the relevant brand users, and not to make things difficult for the workers. The sales scene of some brands such as Li-Ning and Anta Sports was very hot, and netizens and anchors were constantly promoting "supporting domestic products". In fact, Li-Ning also caused dissatisfaction among people who disliked Xiao Zhan and his fans because of the official announcement of Xiao Zhan as the global spokesperson. It was also accused of "profiteering from the national crisis" because the price of its products began to rise. On Weibo, a female internet celebrity named "Gong Yi" with 2.88 million followers often wears brands such as Nike and Adidas. After the Xinjiang cotton scandal, she immediately changed her tune, saying that "the Nike and Adidas brand shoes and clothing I wear are all fake and come from Putian, China. I have no business dealings with Nike and Adidas companies." This move to distance herself from the scandal caused a wave of ridicule.

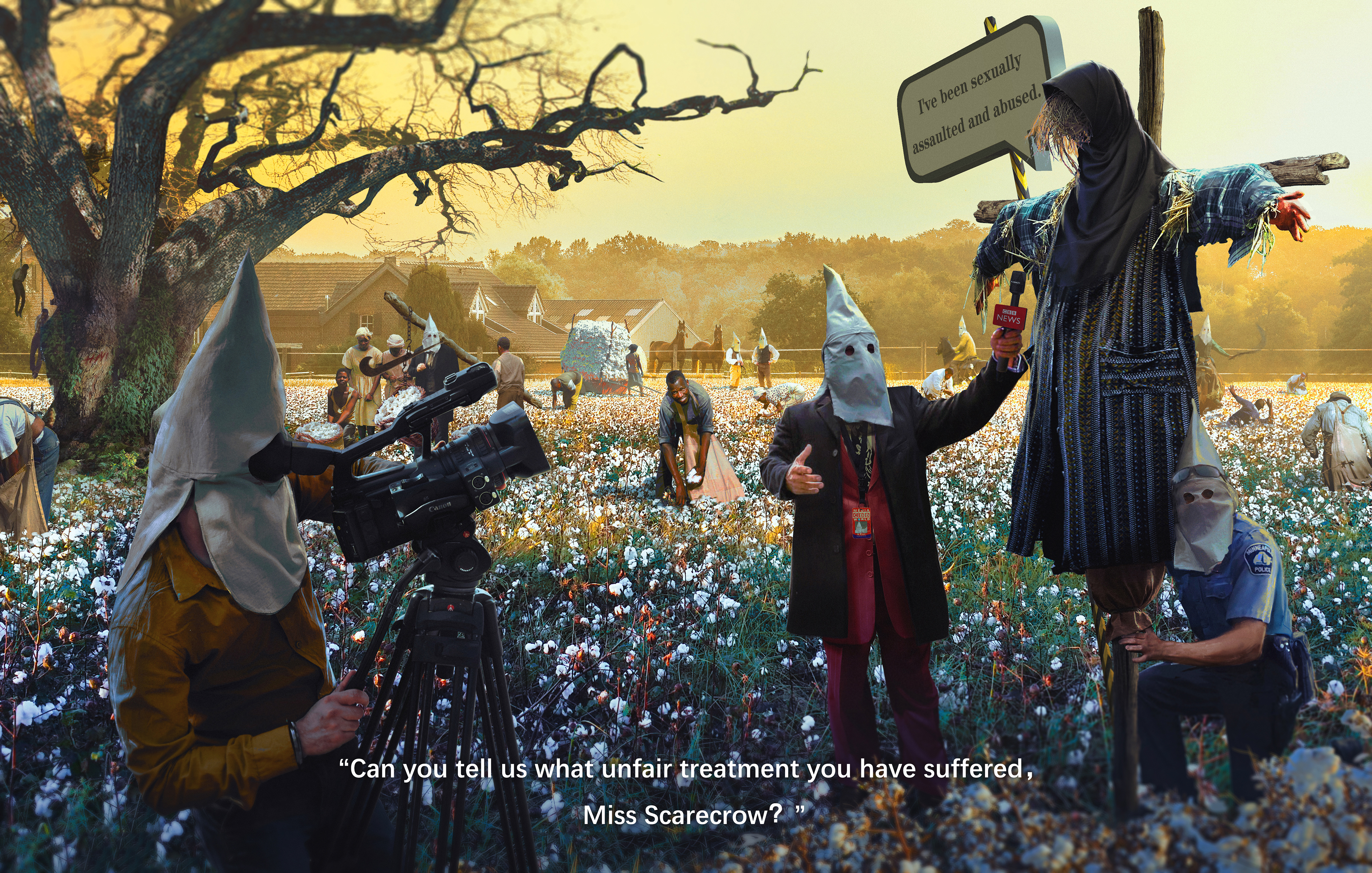
Wuheqilin's computer-generated artwork "Blood Cotton Initiative"

On 26 March 2021, Nike, which had announced that it would abandon the use of Xinjiang cotton and was boycotted in China, launched its new sports shoes. Before the shoes were even sold on online shopping platforms in China, 346,000 people had already made reservations. After the shoes were sold, the limited edition sports shoes were sold out in just one or two seconds by customers in China. The Nike sports shoe trading interface on e-commerce platforms was refreshed every minute, and the trading volume increased instead of decreasing. In physical stores, more than 100 people gathered to draw number plates in order to buy the limited edition sports shoes. On 27 March 2021 Wuheqilin, a Chinese illustrator known as the "Wolf Warrior Illustrator", posted his new work "Blood Cotton Initiative" on Weibo, satirizing the Better Cotton Initiative (BCI) that led the boycott of Xinjiang cotton. The painting also subtly included brands such as H&M and Nike. After the comic was released, it immediately attracted public attention and was interpreted by the outside world as depicting a scene of black people picking cotton. In the distance, there were supervisors wearing white pointed hoods watching them, which reminded people of the "symbol" of the Ku Klux Klan. The microphone in the reporter's hand in the comic had a logo similar to BBC News. They were interviewing a scarecrow on a cross held up by a policeman. The scarecrow could not speak, but a sign was placed next to it to speak on its behalf: "I have been sexually assaulted and abused." The policeman's kneeling posture and uniform also seemed familiar. Some netizens compared this to the murder of George Floyd. In addition, a cotton scale resembling the Nike logo appears in the painting, and there are bloodstains of "H&M" on the tree. In the left corner, there are two black men hanging from the tree.

On 9 May 2021, at noon, a reporter found that there were many customers in the Li-Ning store in Changsha IFS, and many products were out of stock. A sales assistant in the store said that the store's sales had increased by about 30% compared with the same period last year, and Li-Ning sports products were also doing very well. At the same time, news of Li-Ning's hot sales and the sharp drop in sales of Nike and Adidas in China quickly became a hot topic on Weibo. According to data from Morningstar, Inc., the sales of Adidas and Nike on Tmall flagship stores declined sharply in April 2021, both by more than half compared to the same period last year. Among them, Adidas' sales in April declined by 78% year-on-year, and Nike's sales in April declined by 59% year-on-year. Uniqlo's sales in April declined by more than 20% year-on-year. Li-Ning and Anta Sports' total sales in April increased by 72.3% and 51.2% year-on-year, respectively. Among them, Li-Ning's brand, China Li-Ning, saw its sales on Tmall flagship store increase by more than 800% year-on-year in April, with many products in short supply. Some netizens said that many teenagers even resisted buying brands involved in the Xinjiang cotton incident. After the floods in Henan in July 2021, H&M announced that it would donate ¥1 million renminbi to Henan and clothing worth ¥1 million renminbi. Under the shadow of the Xinjiang cotton controversy, Chinese netizens had polarized opinions on H&M's donation to the Henan floods. Some people thought that if we were to judge the matter objectively, the donation was worthy of gratitude, "though it is meager, it is heartwarming"; others questioned that it only donated after "insulting China", saying bluntly, "Thank you for the donation, but we will not forget the insult to China". It can be seen that H&M's move could not regain the trust of consumers in the Chinese market. On 24 June 2021, H&M closed its flagship store in Shanghai due to the boycott.

=== Taiwan ===
Taiwanese president Tsai Ing-wen stated on Facebook that "the issues of Uyghur human rights and Xinjiang cotton have once again aroused public sentiment against multinational corporations and attracted international attention. I hope the Beijing government will think carefully. Patriotism and nationalism are simple feelings among the people, but allowing these feelings to put pressure on enterprises will not only not bring any positive meaning, but also will not help promote China to become a so-called responsible major power. She believes that the human rights issue of the Uyghur people is the essence of the matter, and calls on Beijing to pay attention to human rights as a universal value and face up to the human rights issue of the Uyghur people. Only by stopping the oppression can international doubts be resolved and the confrontation and conflict be resolved." Vice President Lai Ching-te stated: "If China believes that the international community's accusation that the Chinese government is oppressing human rights in Xinjiang is wrong, it can allow international media to conduct interviews in Xinjiang, let the truth be revealed to the public, and let the voices of the people of Xinjiang be heard. It is wrong to attack a company before clarifying the truth and before the voices of the people of Xinjiang are heard. This will not only fail to convince the international community that human rights in Xinjiang have not been violated, but will also make them distrust China even more." Presidential Office Spokesperson Chang Tun-han said: "Beijing should not allow nationalist or patriotic sentiments to exert pressure on the public or organizations, as this will not help China become a so-called responsible major power. Public figures have influence, and we hope that everyone will pay attention to the universal values of human rights." He also appealed: "As for the question just asked, some entertainers have made statements. I think if they are making statements voluntarily, it is because they live in democratic and free Taiwan; if they are forced to make statements, it is because they live in China, which has no democracy and freedom. Democracy and freedom are the reasons why the people of Taiwan can fully express their opinions, and the hard-won democracy and freedom are also the reason why we insist on protecting the way of life of the people of Taiwan."

When interviewed, Taipei Mayor Ko Wen-je said regarding the boycott of Xinjiang cotton: "The US-China trade war will definitely continue. China does have areas where human rights need improvement. Anti-China sentiment will remain a global trend for the next 15 years. No matter what China does, it makes Taiwanese people unhappy. They refuse to buy pineapples, send fighter jets to fly around, and refuse to let Taiwan join the World Health Organization (WHO). I don't know what they are doing." Legislative Yuan Speaker You Si-kun posted on Facebook: "Boycotting Xinjiang cotton is no longer a political issue, but a human rights issue!" Taiwanese legislator Freddy Lim said: "In Taiwan, we can cherish the results of epidemic prevention and live freely. Freedom itself is a value worth protecting. At least the artists performing today will not be required to express their views by the authoritarian government. Especially every time we sing at a music festival, we see anti-nuclear, marriage equality and Uyghur flags, but no one will censor your ideology. This also represents Taiwanese values. On the other hand, those who are willing to speak out for those who are imprisoned in concentration camps and forced to work are the ones who truly support Xinjiang." Kuomintang legislator Chiang Wan-an stated, "Human rights are universal values. The CCP authorities should clearly explain the human rights situation in Xinjiang to the outside world, instead of responding to international questions by inciting nationalism." Hung Hsiu-chu, former chairwoman of the Kuomintang, said in an interview with Taiwanese media that "the Western-manipulated public opinion has no truth." She said, "What is the truth behind some reports in international media or news events in Taiwan? Today, Western countries or other countries are deliberately spreading some wrong information without actually visiting or understanding the local Uyghur people."

=== International reactions ===
- France: Radio France Internationale reported that French member of the European Parliament (MEP) Raphaël Glucksmann and Dilnur Reyhan, president of the European Uyghur Institute, were the key figures calling on Western companies to boycott Xinjiang products.
- Finland: Swedish newspaper Svenska Dagbladet reported: "Swedish-Finnish paper company Stora Enso plans to stop exporting to Xinjiang, China." It continued: "In response to the recent Xinjiang issue, Stora Enso, one of the world's major paper and timber suppliers, announced that it is deeply concerned about human rights and forced labor issues in Xinjiang and plans to stop exporting cellulose to Xinjiang, China. Stora Enso has earned nearly 3.2 billion Swedish krona since 2017 when it exported pulp to textile manufacturers in Xinjiang."
- Iran: From 30 March to 2 April 2021, the Iranian Embassy in China and diplomats from many countries, including members of the Shanghai Cooperation Organisation, were invited to visit Xinjiang. During the visit, Iranian diplomats in China released a video of their visit to a cotton textile factory in Xinjiang and posted it on Weibo with the caption "Xinjiang cotton is very busy". The video refuted the rumors that there was abuse of Uyghur employees in the cotton textile factory in Xinjiang from a real-life perspective. The video was praised by Chinese netizens.
- Italy: Italian newspaper Avvenire stated that Italian fashion brands Benetton Group and OVS have posted announcements on their official websites, claiming that their products wouuld no longer use Xinjiang cotton due to concerns about human rights violations and forced labor. Benetton's official website announcement stated that cotton produced in Xinjiang and Uzbekistan has been accused of abusing child labor and forced labor, so all Benetton products will not use cotton from these regions. Benetton's cotton production chain, from planting to processing, firmly rejects any exploitation of underage laborers or forced labor. OVS's official website announcement stated that cotton produced by Uyghurs in Xinjiang has concerns about forced labor, and OVS has decided to respond to the initiative launched by the Italian "Clean Clothes Campaign" (CCC) and suspend all business dealings related to Xinjiang cotton, thereby calling on the government of China and relevant Chinese enterprises to immediately stop persecuting the human rights of Uyghurs in Xinjiang and stop forced labor on Uyghurs in Xinjiang.
- Sweden: Swedish prime minister Stefan Löfven spoke against the boycott of Swedish brand H&M by China. At a press conference, he said: "I think it's a good thing for companies like H&M to take social responsibility." He continued "H&M has a good working relationship with international trade unions to correct violations." He said "I am very pleased that the company is responsible for the condition of its employees worldwide and ensures that employees are respected and enjoy good conditions." He also said that the trade agreement between the EU and China is at risk of not being approved: "There are a few people who say that this agreement should not be signed with China, and we are debating this." Löfven did not directly answer the question of how relations between Sweden and China were affected, but he said: "We know China very well. We defend human rights and we will never put important things under our chairs." He continued "At the same time, we hope to have good dialogue and good exchanges. China is an important country, but we should maintain a balance between us."
- United States: At a regular press briefing, United States State Department spokesperson Jalina Porter condemned the boycott campaign as "state-led" and that the on social media campaign had targeted American, European and Japanese companies, saying, "We commend and stand with companies that adhere to U.S. laws and ensure that products we are consuming are not made with forced labor." She added "We support and encourage businesses to respect human rights in line with the U.N. guiding principles on business and human rights and the OECD guidelines for multinational enterprises." White House spokeswoman Jen Psaki said that the international community should oppose China's use of private companies' reliance on the Chinese market as a weapon to stifle free speech and obstruct business ethics.
- United Nations: On 29 March 2021, some experts from the Office of the United Nations High Commissioner for Human Rights issued a statement expressing serious concern over allegations of detention and forced labor of Uyghurs in China, calling for unimpeded access to China for factual investigations, and urging global and domestic companies to closely examine their supply chains. Other media outlets reported that, according to information held by the United Nations Human Rights Council, more than 150 companies, both Chinese and foreign, including agribusinesses and companies in the fields of technology, automobiles, textiles, and clothing, have sent at least hundreds of thousands of Uyghur laborers to factories in Xinjiang or other provinces, where they are subjected to exploitative work and abusive living conditions, suffering from arbitrary detention, human trafficking, forced labor, and other atrocities. Surya Deva, vice chair of the UN Human Rights Council's Working Group on Business and Human Rights, said: "Business activities involving Xinjiang will always be a source of conflict between Beijing and Western countries. Businesses cannot turn a blind eye to the plight of Uyghurs and must conduct human rights due diligence in accordance with UN guiding principles."

=== Other reactions ===
The Investor Alliance for Human Rights, comprising more than 50 investors, has called on more than 40 companies, including H&M, VF Corp, Hugo Boss and Inditex, to provide more information about their supply chains and to waive any circumstances that could lead to human rights violations.

Hugo Boss stated in Chinese on Chinese social networking sites that it will continue to purchase cotton from Xinjiang, but an English statement on the company's official website stated that "to date, HUGO BOSS has not purchased any products from Xinjiang from direct suppliers." Company spokesperson Carolin Westermann said the company "is actively engaging with NGOs and other key stakeholders, including investors, to provide a more detailed overview of our standards, values and sustainability initiatives." A BlackRock report stated: "Failure to address human rights-related risks can impact a company's entire value chain, which could…affect shareholder value." A spokesperson for The Vanguard Group said the company "takes human rights issues very seriously, including allegations of forced labor. If a company's business practices or products endanger people's health or safety, it could also pose a long-term financial risk to investors." In a conference call with analysts, Nike CEO John Donahoe responded to questions about competition between Nike and Chinese brands by saying, "Nike is a brand that is of China and for China."

In January 2021, Marks & Spencer announced that it would stop using raw materials and products from Xinjiang and had signed a petition launched by a coalition of civil society groups and labor organizations. It also opposed any Xinjiang cotton obtained through forced labor. WE, a clothing brand from the Netherlands, does not have branches in China and therefore does not have to bear the pressure from China. However, it still issued the following statement on its official website: "WE Fashion does not work with any supplier in or source from Xinjiang. In June 2020 WE Fashion explicitly included the ban on the use of cotton from the Xinjiang region in the WE Code of Conduct, which has been signed off by all suppliers. To date, all cotton for WE Fashion is sustainably sourced in other regions in the world.."

In April 2021, several human rights organizations and individuals filed a lawsuit in a Paris court against Zara, Uniqlo, Sandro and Skechers for allegedly abusing Xinjiang cotton materials produced by Uyghurs who were forced into labor, and for violating human rights.

== Other effects ==
=== Sports ===
In July 2021, FC Barcelona stopped negotiations with H&M on a new sponsorship deal that had been going on for several months, because it did not want to have a conflict with China. In October 2021, Hu Mingxuan, a Chinese Basketball Association (CBA) player born in Ürümqi, Xinjiang, had 20% of his championship bonus deducted by his team for signing an endorsement deal with Adidas.

=== Stock market ===
On 24 March 2021, H&M, Adidas, Nike and other stocks fell by 5.30%, 3.45% and 2.89% respectively. On 25 March 2021, Anta Sports issued a statement withdrawing from BCI, and the Hong Kong stock price of sports stocks rose by 8.4% that day. As for A-shares, ST La Chapelle, Meters/bonwe, Souyute, and Ribbo Fashion hit the daily limit, and Langsha, Heilan Home, and Seven Wolves followed suit. Xinjiang cotton concept stocks, Xinjiang Saiwei and Xinjiang Agricultural Development, both hit the daily limit.

=== Celebrities ===
In addition, Chinese artists who have endorsed or supported the H&M brand in the past, such as Zhao Liying and Feng Shaofeng who endorsed the "H&M 2020 Chinese New Year Series", and Li Yuchun who served as the global spokesperson for the Giambattista Valli x H&M designer collaboration series at the end of 2019, have all been named by netizens.

After her husband Eason Chan announced the termination of all cooperation with Adidas, Hilary Tsui's social media was flooded with posts related to Nike, forcing her to disable the comment function. Joey Wong, who has moved to Canada, was criticized by many netizens for allegedly supporting Xinjiang cotton on Instagram. However, some senior fans questioned whether the account was fake, saying that Joey Wong did not have an Instagram account at all. After Eason Chan announced the termination of his ten-year partnership with Adidas, rumors circulated that the breach of contract penalty would be as high as ¥60 million renminbi. Edison Chen's self-created streetwear brand CLOT was attacked by many netizens on his personal social media platform because he had collaborated with Nike to launch sneakers. They demanded that he make a statement and choose a side as soon as possible. CLOT later deleted the post. Liu Yifei issued a statement through the fan-run "Liu Yifei Bar Official" stating that she had no cooperation relationship with the Adidas brand. However, because Liu Yifei's Weibo did not delete the Adidas-related advertisements, netizens questioned whether Liu Yifei herself had truly terminated the contract. The next day, Liu Yifei expressed her support for Xinjiang cotton on Weibo for the first time, but she did not mention the Xinjiang cotton incident. Instead, she posted an advertisement, which was criticized by netizens.

Jolin Tsai herself did not make any statement on the matter, but was bombarded by some Chinese netizens. Her official Weibo and Jolin Tsai's official fan club posted on Weibo that the sponsor of "Jolin Tsai 2021 World Tour Concert - Taipei Encore Show" has been changed to Puma. However, in fact, the 50,000 tickets for the Ugly Beauty World Tour on 27 March were completely sold out in 5 minutes, which is different from the understanding of Chinese netizens. Because Puma Taiwan officially stated: "We received the sponsorship invitation for this encore show at a rather last minute. Although the sponsorship cooperation content was still under discussion, the annual event budget had been fixed and could not be adjusted or moved at the last minute, so we were unable to cooperate on this encore concert."

Lisa, a member of the South Korean girl group Blackpink, had her cover photo in Harper's Bazaar China taken down without warning because of her endorsement of Adidas. The official announcement post was replaced by other posts. The original post seems to have been deleted. Some netizens searched for the keyword "Lisa" but could not find the cover photo.

=== Programmes ===
Some programs that involve brand trademarks have their images blurred or atomized by the production team.

Name	Type	Notes	Replenish	Ref.
Big Big Old World	News program	Episode 2		
You Are My Hero	TV drama	Bai Jingting's gray Nike T-shirt		
Youth With You 3	Variety show	Adidas was the main apparel sponsor, providing trainees with clothing and athletic shoes for the show's filming.	On 5 March 2021, the official Weibo account of Youth With You announced that the 11th episode would be postponed, and that the trainees would participate in the recording wearing casual clothes and slippers.Additionally, Sun Yihang was seen wearing his clothes backwards in the preview for the 11th episode, making him the only trainee whose clothes did not show the Adidas logo.	
Chuang 2021	Variety show	Puma is the main apparel sponsor, providing trainees with clothing and athletic shoes for the show's filming.		

=== Military effects ===
In April 2024, Armin Papperger, CEO of Rheinmetall, stated that Europe relies on China for more than 70% of its cotton linter, adding "There is a risk [that China could withhold linters for geopolitical reasons]. And that is the reason why we buy as much as possible to fill our stocks". Another industry executive said that "There is a huge undersupply of [nitrocellulose], which is causing difficulties elsewhere within the industry.
