= Xinxuan Group =

MCN operating in China's livestreaming e-commerce market

- Native name: 辛选集团
- Industry: livestreaming e-commerce
- Founded: 2017
- Headquarters: Guangzhou, China
- Key people: Xin Youzhi (Founder & CEO)
- Number of employees: over 4,000 (2021)
- Website: official website

Xinxuan Group (Chinese: 辛选; lit. 'Xin selection') is a retail business operating in China's livestreaming e-commerce segment. Xinxuan's core business is a multi-channel network, on which livestreamers, also known in China as Key Opinion Leaders (KOLs), promote brands and products.

== History ==
Xinxuan Group was founded in 2017 by Xin Youzhi, a popular e-commerce livestreamer on the Chinese short video app Kuaishou. Xinxuan is based in Baiyun District in Guangzhou, in the South of China, where it owns a live broadcast center of 12,000 square meters.

== Business segments ==
Xinxuan Group operates on the following three business segments:

- KOL incubation – Xinxuan offers professional trainings for KOLs.
- Digital e-commerce – Xinxuan operates an online ecosystem through which both itself and other companies can sell the goods and products promoted by KOLs.
- Supply chain management – Xinxuan links with more than 3,000 factories to develop customized products, and provides a channel for more than 5,000 domestic and international brands to market their goods to China's live commerce users.

== Statistics ==
According to iResearch's "China's Livestreaming e-Commerce Industry Report", Xinxuan has over 60 million users and trained 11 KOLs with individual sales records of over RMB 100 million per single live session.

The most successfully marketed products by Xinxuan belong to the categories of beauty and skin care, clothing, food, home & personal care and consumer electronics.

As of end 2021, Xinxuan was reported to employ more than 4,000 people, of which 1,400 are engaged in quality control and KOLs trainings.
