= HLA Group =

Chinese clothing brand

HLA Group CO., LTD

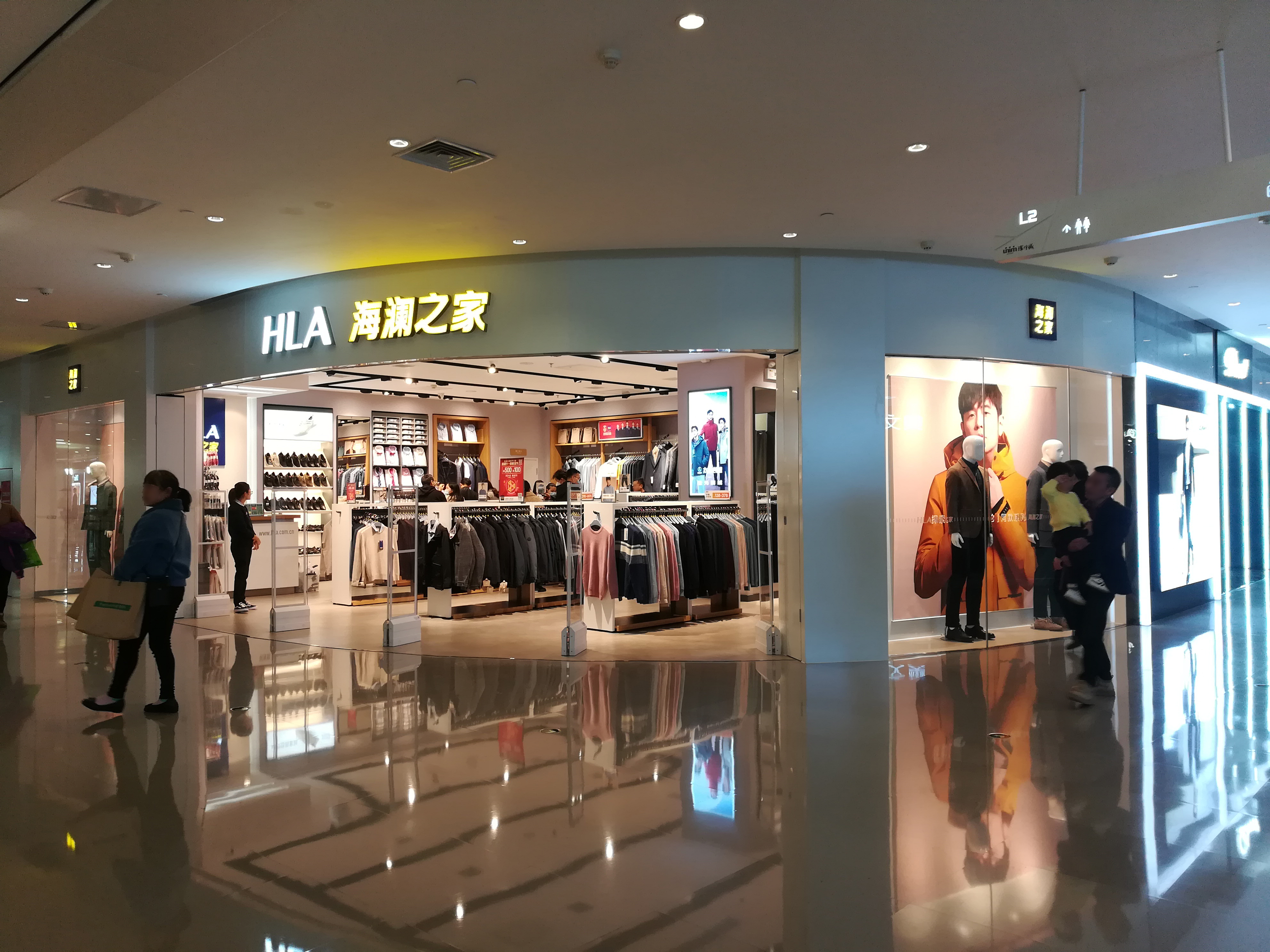
- Heilan Home in Changsha, Hunan, China
- Native name: 海澜之家集团股份有限公司
- Type: Stock
- Traded as: SSE: 600398
- Industry: Retail; Finance; Property; Cultural Tourism
- Founded: 1997
- Founder: Zhou Jianping; Gu Dongsheng (president)
- Headquarters: Jiangyin, Jiangsu, China
- Products: Clothing, textile and others
- Brands: HLA; EICHITOO; BETTSALE; SANCANAL
- Revenue: RMB 12.3 billion yuan (2014)

Chinese name
- Simplified Chinese: 海澜之家
- Traditional Chinese: 海瀾之家
Transcriptions
Standard Mandarin
- Hanyu Pinyin: Hǎilán zhī Jiā
- Website: HLA Official website

HLA (Chinese: 海澜之家; pinyin: Hǎilán zhī Jiā) is short for HLA Group CO., LTD (Chinese: 海澜之家集团股份有限公司). Formerly known as Hailan Home, established in 2002, it is the core fast fashion brand under Hailan Group based in Jiangyin, Jiangsu Province, China. HLA was named as one of “Chinese National Well-known Trademarks” in 2009.

== History ==
1. HLA, established in 2002
2. HLA was named as one of “Chinese National Well-known Trademarks” in 2009.
3. The brand name HLA originates from HEILAN APPAREAL. From the opening of the first HLA store in Nanjing in September 2002 to the moment when it was successfully restructured and listed on April 11, 2014, HLA has become the largest enterprise among the garment sector of A share market with a total market value of over RMB70 billion. By the end of 2014, a total of 3348 HLA stores have been opened up successfully.
4. HLA ranked No. 373 on the Top 500 Chinese Enterprise released by Fortune in 2015, with gross turnover of RMB12.338 billion. HLA won the 3rd place in the ranking of return on equity (ROE) by 33.73%.
5. According to China Capital Markets Development Report, market value of HLA equaled US$11.5 billion in April 2015, slightly below the US$11.6 billion of Coach, the world-renowned luxury brand, and only 4% below the famous US luxury group Ralph Lauren's US$12 billion.
6. HLA was ranked among Forbes Asia's Fab 50 Companies List released on July 24, 2015.

== Positioning ==
HLA is positioned as a fast fashion brand.

== Product Lines ==
HLA owns three product series, business, leisure and fashion, covering 17 product categories and up to 5000 SKUs (stock keeping unit).

== Administration ==
As an asset-light company, HLA focuses on brand assets by integrating over 200 domestic and international supply chains of clothing and accessories.

== Design ==
HLA owns over 300 designers providing design guidance to suppliers.

== Channels & Stores ==
Most HLA stores are located in downtown commercial districts and comprehensive shopping malls in cities at all levels. By the end of 2014, HLA has 3,348 stores in total, covering over 80% of the counties and cities in China.
