= Xin Youzhi =

Chinese entrepreneur and livestreamer

- 辛有志
- Born: 1 January 1990 (age 36); Tonghe, Heilongjiang, China
- Occupation: Entrepreneur
- Known for: Livestreamer on Kuaishou
- Title: Founder and Chief Executive Officer of Xinxuan Group
- Spouse: Chu Ruixue

Xin Youzhi (Chinese: 辛有志; born January 1, 1990), also known as Xinba (辛巴) - the Chinese for Simba), is a livestreamer with 98.8 million followers on Chinese short video app Kuaishou and founder of Xinxuan Group, a multi-channel network (MCN) company in China’s livestream e-commerce industry.

== Early life and career ==
Xin Youzhi was born in a farmer's family in a village of Heilongjiang Province, Northeast China.

In 2017, Xin founded Xinxuan Group. Xin Youzhi and three other Xinxuan team members were ranked today among the top ten livestreamers in China, accounting for nearly one quarter of Kuaishou’s Gross Merchandise Value (GMV).

During China’s Singles' Day shopping festival in 2020, Xin Youzhi achieved RMB 1.88 billion sales in his 12-hour long live-streaming session.

In November 2020, a team member of Xin Youzhi was caught selling fake edible bird’s nest, a popular yet expensive health supplement in China, which turned out to be sugar water. This generated a big scandal resulting into a fine of 900,000 RMB and a 60-day temporary ban from livestreaming for Xinba and his team. Xin Youzhi recovered fast from this episode: on 27 March 2021, in his first livestream after the ban, he was reported to have gained 15 million new followers, and sold more than 2 billion RMB worth of goods, a record on Kuaishou. On 30 June 2021, the Arbitration Commission of Guangzhou ruled that the supplier was to be deemed responsible for the provision of the fake product and had to compensate Xin’s company.

Xin Youzhi was caught in a new controversy in April 2022, due to a trademark dispute with Australian activewear brand YPL, which ended with an official apology by YPL.

== Philanthropy ==
Xin Youzhi ranked 22nd in the "Hurun China Philanthropy List 2021" released by the Hurun Research Institute. Moreover, Xin Youzhi claimed that his company donated USD 21 million to Wuhan in support for the fight against COVID-19, while he offered medical supplies to his hometown.

== Personal life ==
Xin Youzhi is married to Chu Ruixue. The couple spent USD 7 million to USD 10 million to invite 42 celebrities to the wedding, which took place in Beijing National Stadium.
