= Li Jiaqi (beauty influencer) =

Chinese beauty influencer

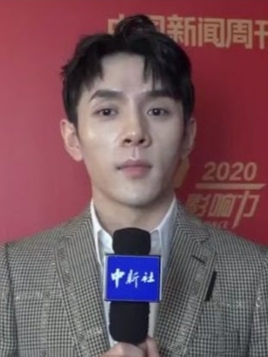
- Li Jiaqi in 2020
- Born: Li Jiaqi; 7 June 1992 (age 33)

Li Jiaqi (Chinese: 李佳琦; pinyin: Lǐ Jiāqí; born 7 June 1992), also known by his English name, Austin Li, is a Chinese streamer, social media influencer, and entrepreneur focusing on beauty and cosmetics. He is often referred to as the "Lipstick King" (Chinese: 口红一哥; pinyin: Kǒuhóng yīgē). Li is known for the large volume of sales his streams generate.

== Early life and education ==
Li was born in Yueyang, Hunan province. Li attended Nanchang University, studying dance, but left before earning his degree.

== Career ==
Li began his career as a L'Oréal shop assistant in Nanchang, Jiangxi province. Li began streaming on Taobao in 2017, and by the end of the year had earned an estimated $1.53 million.

Li gained fame for his marathon streams, wherein he would apply several hundred different brands of lipstick to his lips over the course of several hours. (As of 2018, Li holds the Guinness World Record for most lipstick applications within 30 seconds — four.) On Singles' Day in 2021, Li's 12-hour livestream on Taobao generated $1.7 billion in collective sales. During one livestream, he sold 15,000 lipsticks in the space of five minutes in a competition against Alibaba CEO Jack Ma.

Li's streams are noted for his florid descriptions of products and his colorful wording and catchphrases. He states his time at the L'Oréal shop allowed him to hone his ability to describe beauty products, and is noted for using terminology like "a colour that is tender like water" and "crystal-like stars". A signature catchphrase of his is "OMG sisters, buy this!" (Chinese: OMG姐妹们买它; pinyin: OMG jiěmèimen mǎi tā!) for products he is particularly fond of.

By March 2021, he had over 35 million followers on TikTok and seven million on Sina Weibo, earning an estimated $10–20 million per month. By June 2022, he had 170 million followers.

He was listed on the 2021 Time 100 Next list by American magazine Time.

During a livestream on 3 June 2022, Li presented an ice cream cake that resembled a tank on air, and the show abruptly went offline, prompting speculation from viewers and fans. The prevailing explanation on Chinese social media, echoed in The Wall Street Journal, was that the tank-like cake was considered reminiscent of Tank Man, a figure from the Tiananmen Square protests and massacre of 4 June 1989 subject to censorship in China. Li stated on Weibo that the stream had ended due to a technical glitch. His next scheduled livestream was not aired. Bloomberg News noted that Li had refrained from livestream on 4 June in previous years, seemingly to avoid offending censors. Following the incident, queries for Li's name on e-commerce sites and search engines return blank results.

The BBC reported on the incident that many of Li Jiaqi's fans did not understand why his stream cut off when the tank ice cream appeared as they lacked awareness of the Tiananmen Square events and were subsequently making queries on social media to try to understand. Sina Tech quoted some relevant persons that products on Taobao associated with Li Jiaqi had been adjusted by the host and sellers without input from Taobao.

On 20 September, Li resumed his livestreaming on Taobao.

== Personal life ==
Li is known to keep details of his personal life to himself. Li has not expressed any political views. Li has five Bichons Frisés, who are also managed under the pet lifestyle brand Never's Family.

Li lives in Shanghai. In 2020, he obtained a Shanghai hukou under a city government program designed to attract skilled residents.
