= China Consumers Association =

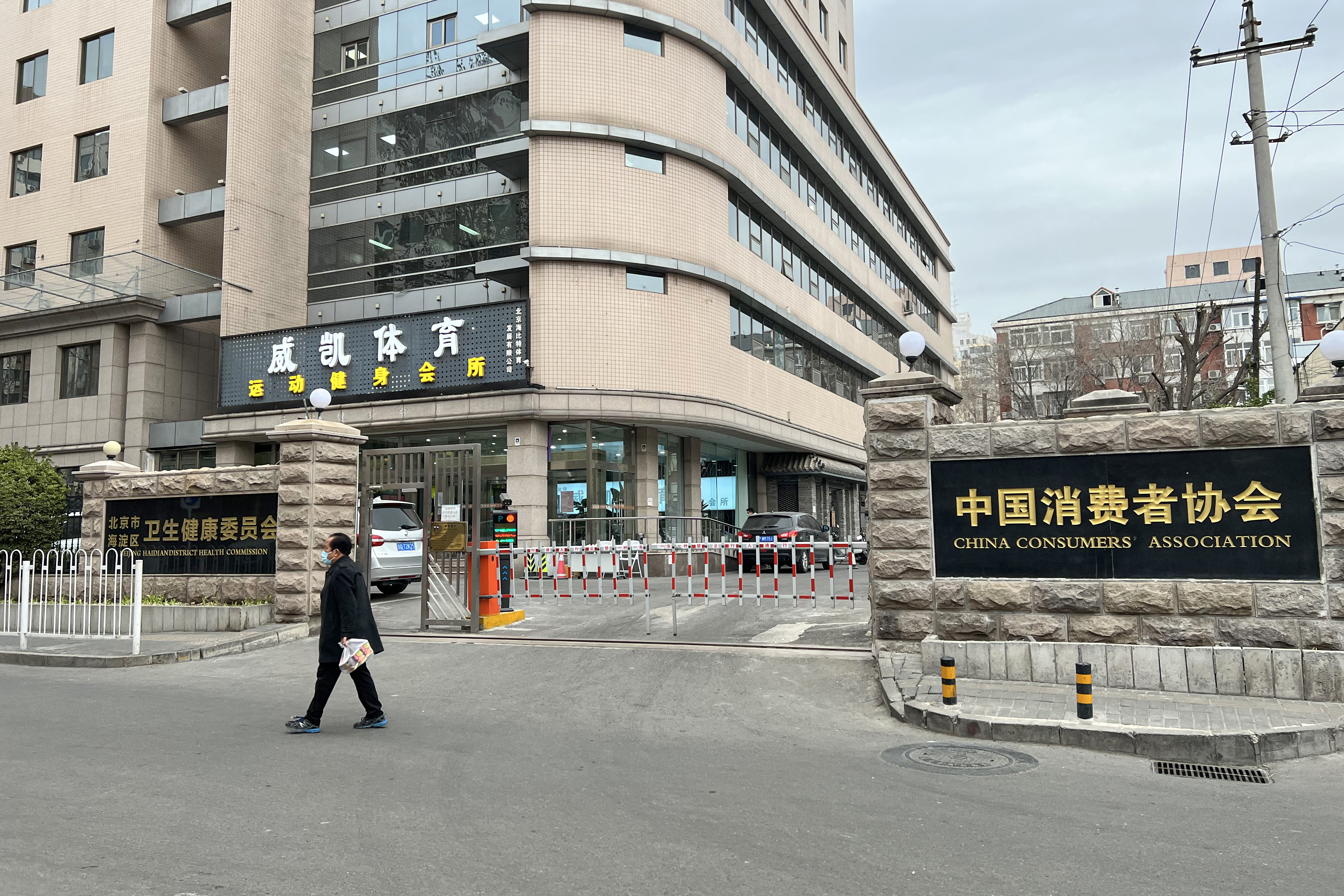
- Headquarters of the CCA
- Company type: Association
- Founded: December 1984
- Headquarters: China

China Consumers Association (Chinese: 中国消费者协会; abbr. CCA) is a Chinese consumer association, founded in December 1984. The association consists of 3,279 of the local and grassroots level consumer organizations in China. It promotes a healthy environment for a communist market economy by safeguarding consumer rights and interests, monitoring the goods and services, and providing counselling on the consumer activities. CCA maintains cooperation with consumer organizations from its member countries across the world. The association has participated in over 60 international and regional seminars and has hosted the large-scale international conferences on themes such as Sustainable consumption and Global Food Safety.

CCA maintains an updated website with consumer advice and information and publishes the China Consumers Magazine. China Consumers Monthly began in 1994 which includes the original research, comparative product testing, consumer warnings, and answers to the frequently asked questions. The magazine has an account on WeChat, opened in 2015.

== Initiatives ==
The China Consumers Association requested on 1 March that movie theatres should avoid holiday price rising and level film-ticket pricing, following consumer complaints during the Lunar New Year holiday. The group received almost 100,000 unfavourable remarks about movie ticket prices during the seven-day holiday beginning on 11 February. According to the group, complaints about excessive ticket prices peaked the fifth day of the holiday on 15 February. The association stated in a response that we advise responsible parties for film tickets to stabilize prices and adhere to market regulations while caring more about User experiences.

China Consumers Association developed a complaint-handling mechanism in collaboration with 17 of the leading e-commerce platforms like Taobao.com, JD.com, and Vip.com. The mechanism was initiated for the internet shoppers who find it easier to resolve their complaints which are directly handled by the platform's after-sales system connected to the e-commerce platforms and gets prioritized for the resolution, thus avoiding any conflicts for online buyers in the future.
