= WE (clothing) =

Dutch fashion store chain

WE Fashion
- Industry: Retail
- Founded: 1917
- Founder: E. H. de Waal
- Headquarters: The Netherlands
- Products: Clothing, Fashion
- Owner: R. de Waal
- Number of employees: 2,000
- Website: wefashion.com

WE, also known as WE Fashion, is an international fashion brand that has been designing modern clothing for men, women, and kids since 1917. With its Casually Stylish collections, WE offers versatile outfits for every moment. All items are designed entirely in-house and available in over 130 stores across three countries, at wefashion.com, and through online partners in more than 20 countries.

WE Fashion is a vertically integrated company that develops its collections and most of its marketing, advertising, and retail concepts in-house. WE has today over 1,500 employees – at the head office and in stores – work on and with fashion that combines style, quality, and service. The slogan Wear the Moment is part of WE’s mission: to create clothing for moments that matter – effortlessly stylish and easy to mix and match. WE Fashion is part of the European fashion group Logo International, which also owns the O’Neill brand.

== History ==
On February 1, 1917, E.H. (Egbertus Hendricus, known as 'Edwin') de Waal founded a men’s clothing wholesale business in Amsterdam under the name E.H. de Waal. A significant part of the collection was sold under the brand Sir Edwin, promoted with the slogan “Sir Edwin, ondergoed is wondergoed.” The company, based on the Keizersgracht, grew to become the largest menswear wholesaler in the Netherlands.

In 1961, Edwin’s son Karel (nicknamed Kees) de Waal (1922-2025) took over the business. A year later, he added a small retail chain with four stores and introduced the Captain Shop. In 1962, the chain was renamed Hij – initially Hij Herenmode, later Hij Mannenmode. The stores also sold boys’ clothing.

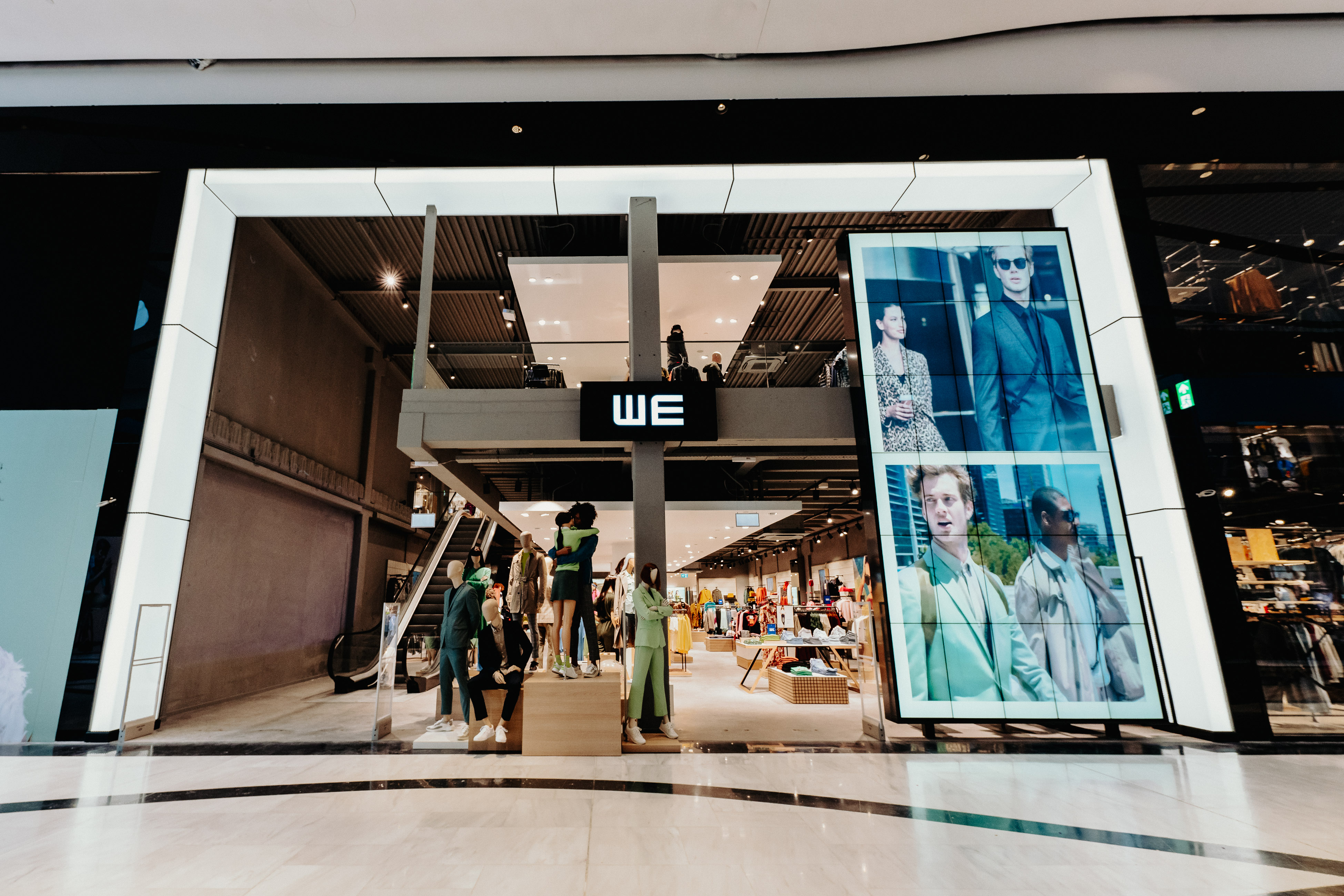
WE-winkel Leidschendam

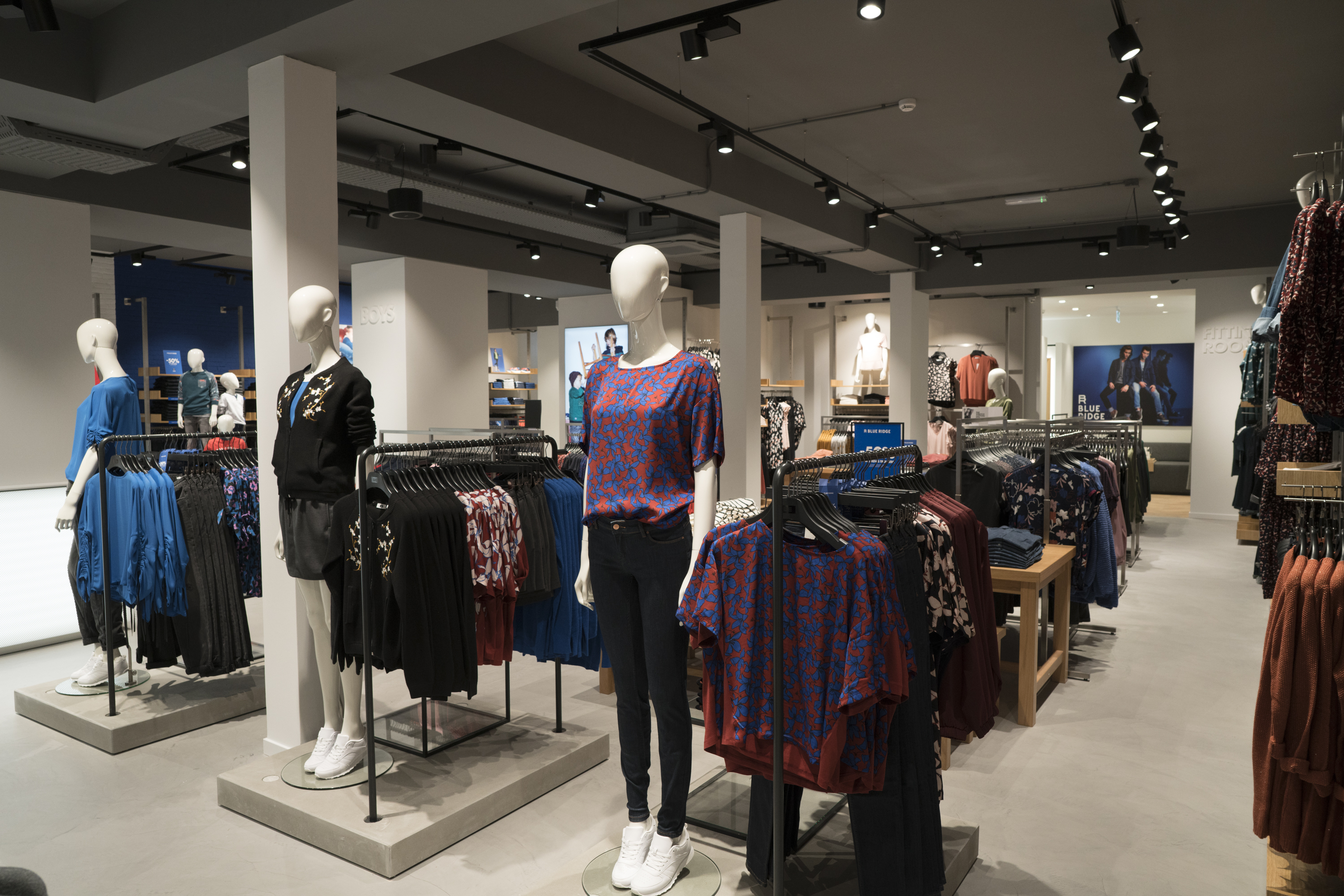
WE-winkel Turnhout

After selling the wholesale business, the focus shifted to national retail expansion. By 1977, 75 Hij Mannenmode stores had opened across the Netherlands. That same year, Ronald de Waal – Kees’s son – joined the company, marking the start of international growth. In Switzerland, the company acquired about ten menswear stores and added another 30 within a few years. The Swiss stores operated under the name Hey.

From 1983 onwards, Hij Mannenmode opened around 25 stores in Belgium. In 1984, Kees stepped down as director. Ronald continued expanding and, in 1986, acquired the womenswear brand Witteveen. These stores, active in both the Netherlands and Belgium, were soon rebranded as Zij.

In 1989, following a fire at Witteveen’s head office in Amsterdam, the headquarters of Hij and Zij were merged into a new central office and distribution centre in Lage Weide, near Utrecht. Three years later, the company entered the German market with a store format combining Hij and Zij under one roof – the precursor to today’s WE stores. In 1994, the brand expanded to France, opening several stores around Paris.

In March 1999, all stores were rebranded at once to WE – the start of a new international identity. Since 2009, the WE collection has also been available online, as well as via selected e-commerce partners. In 2010, the first WE stores opened in Vienna.

In more recent years, WE has increasingly focused on online retail. Wefashion.com now represents a significant part of total sales. Online platforms such as Wehkamp, Zalando, About You and Bol give WE access to millions of customers across Europe. Today, WE Fashion sells in more than 25 countries through these channels.

Due to this shift in focus, the number of physical stores has been reduced to around 135, mainly in its core markets: the Netherlands, Belgium and Switzerland. In 2019, the brand’s newest store concept launched in the flagship store on Kalverstraat in Amsterdam. Many larger stores have since been redesigned to follow this concept.

The new concept, designed by Dedato designers & architects, centers around incorporating smart technology and social media into the shopping experience.

== Head Office ==
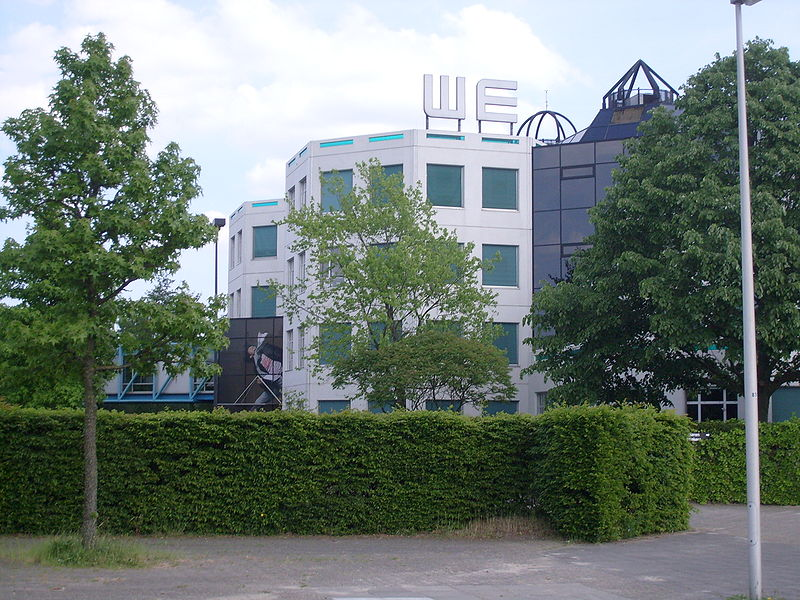
Head Office WE Fashion in Utrecht

WE’s European head office is located in Utrecht’s Lage Weide industrial area, alongside the brand’s central distribution centre. This facility handles all shipments for stores in the Netherlands and across Europe. The location also features WE’s own photo studio, where collections are shot for campaigns and digital platforms.

== Mission & Vision ==
WE Fashion’s mission is to design high-quality, fashionable collections at a fair price. The brand aims to inspire customers to feel confident and to connect with those around them.

The vision, Life is better together, reflects the belief that life’s best moments are shared.

== Sustainability ==
A strong sustainability strategy is a key priority at WE. The brand focuses on four pillars: improving products and processes, enhancing working conditions, optimising work methods, and contributing to society.

WE Fashion also holds its products to high standards. It offers a 365-day quality guarantee and uses recycled materials wherever possible, including through its partnership with Better Cotton.

Careful attention is paid to both production sites and internal operations. At the Utrecht distribution centre, WE operates a large solar park and is making real progress toward zero-emission transport — with one in three delivery trucks now electric.

== Diversity & Inclusion ==
Diversity and inclusion are also important focus areas at WE Fashion. Two out of three leadership positions are held by women, and a dedicated Diversity & Inclusion Council ensures these topics remain on the agenda throughout the organisation.
