= Chen Wei =

Chen Wei or Wei Chen may refer to:

== People surnamed Chen ==
- Wei Chen (engineer), Chinese-American mechanical engineer
- Chen Wei (food scientist) (born 1966), Chinese food scientist
- Chen Wei (medical scientist) (born 1966), Chinese epidemiologist
- Chen Wei (politician) (born 1966), Chinese politician
- Chen Wei (dissident) (born 1969), Chinese dissident and human rights activist
- Wei Chen (journalist), Canadian television and radio journalist
- Chen Wei (artist) (born 1980), Chinese artist
- Chen Wei (baseball) (born 1983), baseball pitcher
- Chen Wei (footballer, born 1993), Chinese footballer for Shanghai Shenxin
- Chen Wei (footballer, born 1998), Chinese footballer for Shanghai SIPG
- Chen Da Wei, Chinese violinist

== People surnamed Wei ==
- Vision Wei (born 1986), Chinese pop singer

== See also ==
- Wei (disambiguation)
- Chen (disambiguation)
