= Who's the Murderer =

- 大侦探
- Genre: Variety show
- Based on: Crime Scene
- Directed by: He Chen
- Starring: He Jiong; Wang Ou; Da Zhang Wei; Zhang Ruoyun; Wei Daxun; Yang Rong; Wei Chen; Wu Xin; Liu Haoran
- Country of origin: China
- Original language: Chinese
- No. of seasons: 11
- No. of episodes: 130

Production
- Executive producer: Zhou Shan
- Producers: Liu Chenliang, Xie Lin
- Production location: China
- Running time: 120 minutes
- Production company: Mango TV

Original release
- Network: Mango TV
- Release: March 27, 2016 – present

Who's the Murderer (simplified Chinese: 明星大侦探; traditional Chinese: 明星大偵探; pinyin: Míngxīng dà zhēntàn) is a Chinese variety show produced by Mango TV. It stars He Jiong, Da Zhang Wei, Zhang Ruoyun with regular guests Wang Ou, Liu Haoran, Wei Daxun, Yang Rong, Wei Chen and Wu Xin. The format and license were introduced by Korean JTBC's Crime Scene. It was listed in the 'Most Popular Chinese Variety Show'.

== Format ==
The program presents complex plots focused on logical reasoning and uncovering the truth behind each case. It combines aspects of scripted television and variety show formats, encouraging participants to apply critical thinking to solve the mystery.

- Alibi: Each player introduces their suspect role, shares their connection to the victim, and outlines their actions before, during, and after the crime.
- On-Site Investigation: Players split into two teams and have ten minutes to investigate, each allowed up to ten photos with a personal camera.
- Briefing: Players present their evidence, question others, and state who they believe the criminal is.
- First Criminal Vote: The detective publicly votes on their suspect after each player’s briefing.
- Additional On-Site Investigation: Players investigate and discuss at the crime scene simultaneously with the 1-on-1 interrogation.
- 1-on-1 Interrogation: The detective, always innocent, can summon players for further questioning in the interrogation room..
- Final Criminal Vote: After final statements and debriefing, players vote secretly for the criminal. The accused is arrested; if correct, the detective and innocents earn rewards, if not, the criminal wins.

== Casts ==
- Main casts

Name	Profession	Note
He Jiong	Host, Actor	Season 1–11
Sa Beining	Host, Journalist	Season 1–6
Zhang Ruoyun	Actor	Season 1,3–11
Wowkie Da	Singer, Musician	Seasons 1–4, 6–11

- Recurring casts

Name	Profession	Note
Wang Ou	Actress, Model	Season 1–11
Bai Jingting	Actor, Singer	Season 1–6
Emma Wu	Singer, Actress	Season 1–5
Yang Rong	Actress	Seasons 2–3, 5–11
Vision Wei	Singer, Actor	Season 2–11
Wei Daxun	Actor	Season 1-6，8–11
Liu Haoran	Actor	Season 1，4–11
Wu Xin	Host, Actor	Season 4–11

== Seasons ==
Season	Episodes	Originally aired	
Season	Episodes	First aired	Last aired
1	13	March 27, 2016	June 23, 2016
2	14	January 13, 2017	April 14, 2017
3	13	November 3, 2017	January 26, 2018
4	14	October 26, 2018	January 25, 2019
5	13	November 8, 2019	February 14, 2020
6	12	December 24, 2020	March 17, 2021
7	12	January 28, 2022	May 13, 2022
8	13	January 19, 2023	April 20, 2023
9	13	February 14, 2024	May 8, 2024
10	13	February 5, 2025	May 22, 2025

With its growing success, Who’s The Murderer received major investments, resulting in striking visuals and immersive effects.

- Season 1:

In the prologue, the cast were introduced to the case and selected their roles as either suspects or the detective. Suspects received detailed character information and could conceal facts unless directly asked, but only the criminal was allowed to lie.

- Season 2:

In this season, gold bars were given early but must be returned if votes are wrong. Roles were hidden until revealed. The detective’s first vote was private. Only correct voters could keep gold bars; detectives can earn two, and suspects who remain hidden keep all six.

- Season 3:

It utilised realistic scenes with original props and settings. Each case has one or two victims, making them more complex than before.

- Season 4:

It continued using real sets and brought back the detective’s assistant role, played by university students.

- Season 5:

It used a real cruise ship... as the set for its first episode, kept the detective’s assistant role, and retained the previous seasons’ format.

- Season 6:

It introduced double detective mode with 7 players and two votes per detective; otherwise, the format stayed the same.

- Season 7:

It replaced Benny Sa with new and recurring cast members, kept double detective mode, and switched to detective badges. Assistants vote once in round two. Badges are earned for correct votes and MVPs. The top four badge holders (excluding He Jiong) earn "Stellar Detective" titles.

== Episodes ==
=== Season 1 (2016) ===
Episode	Date	Guest(s)	Case Briefing	Criminal	Results
0	27 March 2016	Qiao Zhenyu, Bai Jingting	Gathering of the Famous Detectives (IQ test); Victim: Evil Manager, Zhen Badao; He Jiong: 90 points Sa Beining: 88 points Gui Gui: 50 points Qiao Zhenyu: 45 points Wang Ou: 30 points	N/A	He Jiong is the smartest detective.
1	3 April 2016	Qiao Zhenyu, Bai Jingting	Fall of the Campus Beauty; Victim: University M, student Xia Qingtian; Detective: Sa Beining; Boyfriend: He Jiong; Club Member 1: Wang Ou; Club Member 2: Qiao Zhenyu; Club Member 3: Gui Gui; Club Teacher: Bai Jingting	Gui Gui	Cast won
2	10 April 2016	Bai Jingting, Da Zhangwei (大张伟)	Unable to Triumph in the Skies; Victim: MG carrier airline, co-pilot Zhen; Detective: Sa Beining; Pilot: Da Zhangwei; Flight Attendant 1: Bai Jingting; Flight Attendant 2: Wang Ou; Head Stewardess: Gui Gui; Trainee: He Jiong	He Jiong	Criminal won Arrested:Bai Jingting(Flight Attendant Bai)
3	17 April 2016	Da Zhangwei, Chen Ruoxuan (陈若轩)	Battle within the 'fresh meat' boy group (No Zuo No Die / NZND); Victim: MG entertainment group, Manager Zhen; Detective: Gui Gui; Main Vocalist: Da Zhangwei; Vocalist: Sa Beining; Visual: He Jiong; Rapper: Bai Jingting; Dancer: Chen Ruoxuan	Chen Ruoxuan	Criminal won Arrested:Sa Beining(Vocalist Sa)
4	24 April 2016	Ouyang Nana, Liu Haoran	Mermaid's Tears; Victim: Mermaid Island, Master Zhen; Detective: He Jiong; Shop owner: Sa Beining; White-collar worker: Wang Ou; Young Master: Gui Gui; Princess: Ouyang Nana; Popular kid: Liu Haoran	Wang Ou	Cast won
5	1 May 2016	Da Zhangwei, Zhang Ruoyun	The Missing Groom; Victim: Real estate agent, Groom Zhen; Detective: Sa Beining; Bride: Wang Ou; Bridesmaid: Gui Gui; Marriage Celebrant: He Jiong; Groomsman: Da Zhangwei; Wedding Consultant: Zhang Ruoyun	He Jiong	Criminal won Arrested:Wang Ou(Bride Ou)
6	8 May 2016	Sun Jian (孙坚), Wei Daxun (魏大勋)	Crazy Tulip; Victim: Tulip Mansion, Botanist Zhen Cheng; Detective: Wang Ou; Genius Colleague: Sa Beining; Chemist: Gui Gui; DNA Scientist: Sun Jian; Guest:He Jiong; Rich Guest: Wei Daxun	Sun Jian	Cast won
7	15 May 2016	Kevin Tsai	Reply 1998; Victim: Gaming Room, Boss Zhen; Detective: He Jiong; Step-daughter: Gui Gui; Worker: Sa Beining; Town Beauty: Wang Ou; Town Beauty's Son:Bai Jingting; Town Resident: Kevin Tsai	Sa Beining	Cast won
8	22 May 2016	Zhang Ruoyun	All Because of Beauty; Victim: Very Pretty Plastic Surgery Hospital, Surgeon Zhen; Detective: Bai Jingting; Nurse: Gui Gui; Cleaner: Wang Ou; Patient: Sa Beining; Deputy Director:He Jiong; Investor: Zhang Ruoyun	Zhang Ruoyun	Cast won
9	29 May 2016	Qiao Zhenyu	Decisive Battle of the UEFA Champions League; Victim: Football Club, Main Striker Zhen; Detective: Sa Beining; Player: Bai Jingting; Cheerleader: Wang Ou; Team physician: Gui Gui; Retired player:He Jiong; Player on opposing team: Qiao Zhenyu	Wang Ou	Criminal won Arrested:Bai Jingting(Player Bai)
10	5 June 2016	Da Zhangwei, Jackson Wang	Avengers' Broken Alliance; Victim: The Avengers: Rise of the Barbeque Hero film set, Warrior Zhen; Detective: Gui Gui; Beauty: Wang Ou; Bungee Jumping Actor: Sa Beining; BBQ Grill Actor: He Jiong; Facial Mask Actor:Da Zhangwei; Best Actor: Jackson Wang	Da Zhangwei	Cast won
11	12 June 2016	Da Zhangwei, Aaron Yan	Ghost in the General's Residence; Victim: Ming Country, M City, Warlord Zhen; Detective: He Jiong; Chief of Staff: Sa Beining; Sixth Concubine: Wang Ou; Ghost Hunter: Da Zhangwei; Family Tutor: Gui Gui; General's son: Aaron Yan	Da Zhangwei	Criminal won Arrested:Emma Wu鬼鬼
12	19 June 2016	Da Zhangwei	Wheel of Fate; Victim: 'Titantic' passenger liner, President James Zhen; Detective/Pirate: Da Zhangwei; Carl: He Jiong; Jack: Sa Beining; Rose: Wang Ou; Captain: Bai Jingting; Sorceress: Gui Gui	Sa Beining	Criminal won Arrested:Bai Jingting(Captain Bai)

=== Season 2 (2017) ===
Episode	Date	Guest(s)	Case Briefing	Criminal	Results
0	13 January 2017	Ariel Lin, Dong Li (董力)	Return of the Famous Detectives; Victim:Fan meeting, Teacher Zhen; Hosts: He Jiong, Sa Beining; Detectives: He Jiong, Sa Beining, Wang Ou, Bai Jingting	The elder twin	Cast won
1	20 January 2017	Yang Rong, Wei Daxun	Nirvana in Fire: The Princess is Here; Victim: Crown Prince's residence, Princess Zhen; Detective: Bai Jingting; Advisor: He Jiong; Crown Prince: Sa Beining; Concubine: Gui Gui; General: Wei Daxun; Palace maid Yang Rong	Sa Beining	Criminal won Arrested:Yang Rong(Palace Maid Rong)
Chinese New Year Special	27 January 2017	Da Zhangwei, Jackson Wang, Ivy Chen	Detectives' New Year Dinner; Cast members: He Jiong, Sa Beining, Bai Jingting	N/A	N/A
2	3 February 2017	Da Zhangwei, Jackson Wang, Ivy Chen	Chinatown Legend; Victim: Tour guide Zhen; Detective:Sa Beining; Chinese Herbal shop owner: He Jiong; Chef Bai Jingting; Fruit store owner: Da Zhangwei; Tourist: Jackson Wang; Chinatown Beauty Ivy Chen	He Jiong	Criminal won Arrested:Ivy Chen(Beauty Chen)
3	10 February 2017	Ariel Lin, Dong Li, Lin Bohong (林柏宏)	Midnight Train; Victims: Rich Merchant Zhen, Passenger Hai; Detective: He Jiong; Passenger 1: Sa Beining; Passenger 2: Bai Jingting; Stewardess: Wang Ou; Passenger 3: Ariel Lin; Passenger 4: Dong Li; Steward / Witness: Lin Bohong	Bai Jingting	Criminal won Arrested:Sa Beining(Passenger Sa)
4	17 February 2017	Wei Daxun	Night at the Museum; Victim: Museum Director Zhen; Detective: Gui Gui; Artefact Collector: He Jiong; Officer: Sa Beining; Young Master: Bai Jingting; Mysterious Person: Wang Ou; Night guard: Wei Daxun	Wei Daxun	Cast won
5	24 February 2017	Jackson Wang, Qiao Zhenyu	See You on Friday; Victim: Popular actress Zhen; Detective: Jackson Wang; Visual: He Jiong; Vocalist: Sa Beining; Rapper: Bai Jingting; Entertainment reporter:Wang Ou; Student: Qiao Zhenyu	Wang Ou	Cast won
6	3 March 2017	Jackson Wang, Qiao Zhenyu	2046; Victim:Genius Zhen, Tester Gui; Detective:Wang Ou; Perfect Robot: He Jiong; Assistant: Sa Beining; Scientist: Jackson Wang; Transport Robot: Qiao Zhenyu	He Jiong	Cast won
7	10 March 2017	Wei Daxun, Yang Rong	Terrifying Nursery Rhyme: Part 1 Victim: Mansion in the mountains, Duke Zhen; Detective: Sa Beining; Lawyer: He Jiong; Postman: Bai Jingting; Duchess: Gui Gui; Housekeeper:Wei Daxun; Noble Lady: Yang Rong	Bai Jingting	Cast won
8	17 March 2017	Wei Daxun, Yang Rong, Joker Xue	Terrifying Nursery Rhyme: Part 2 Victim: Mansion in the mountains, Postman Bai; Detective: Sa Beining; Lawyer: He Jiong; Duchess: Gui Gui; Housekeeper:Wei Daxun; Noble Lady: Yang Rong; Hunter: Joker Xue	Noble Lady Yang	Cast won
9	24 March 2017	Alec Su, Jackson Wang, Yang Rong	The Desperate Housewife; Victim: Housewife Zhen; Detective: He Jiong; Worker: Sa Beining; Insurance agent: Bai Jingting; Muscleman: Jackson Wang; Yoga Instructor:Yang Rong; Receptionist: Alec Su	Alec Su	Cast won
10	31 March 2017	Da Zhangwei, Jackson Wang, Yang Rong, Sun Yi	Drunk in the Flower Field; Victim:Rich Merchant Zhen; Detective: Yang Rong; Opera Singer: He Jiong; Opera Director: Sa Beining; Drunkard: Jackson Wang; Eldest Disciple: Da Zhangwei; Madam: Sun Yi	Da Zhangwei	Cast won
11	7 April 2017	Wei Daxun, Sha Yi (沙溢), Wei Chen, Xia Zhiguang (夏之光)	Crazy Circus; Victim: Magician Zhen; Detective: Wei Daxun; Detective's Assistant:Xia Zhiguang; Sweet Guy: He Jiong; Island Resident: Sa Beining; Clown: Gui Gui; Professor: Sha Yi; Singer: Wei Chen	Gui Gui	Criminal won. Arrested: Sa Beining
12	14 April 2017	Wei Daxun, Huang Lei	Wrap Party; Victim: Who's the Murderer? film set, Director Xiao Hezi; Detective: Huang Lei; Cast members: He Jiong, Sa Beining, Gui Gui, Bai Jingting	Criminal: He Jiong (hirer); Bounty Hunter: Sa Beining. The first episode to involve two criminals.	Criminals won.

=== Season 3 (2017) ===
Episode	Date	Guest(s)	Case Briefing	Criminal	Results
0	22 September 2017	Zhang Ruoyun, Leo Wu	Detectives' Dignity; Detectives Team 1: He Jiong, Sa Beining Detective Team 2: Emma Wu, Bai Jingting; Detectives Team 3: Zhang Ruoyun, Leo Wu	N/A	All 3 teams successfully escape from the room within 10 minutes
1	3 November 2017	Zhang Ruoyun, Leo Wu	Hotel Horrors: Part 1 & 2 Victim: Richest Man Zhen Hong; Detective:Sa Beining; Manhua Fanatic: He Jiong; Sprinter: Leo Wu Lei; Best Game Player: Bai Jingting; Hotel Manager: Zhang Ruoyun; Vet: Sa Beining; Keyun: Emma Wu	Bai Jingting	Cast won
2	10 November 2017	Zhang Ruoyun, Leo Wu	Hotel Horrors: Part 1 & 2 Victim: Richest Man Zhen Hong; Detective:Sa Beining; Manhua Fanatic: He Jiong; Sprinter: Leo Wu Lei; Best Game Player: Bai Jingting; Hotel Manager: Zhang Ruoyun; Vet: Sa Beining; Keyun: Emma Wu	Leo Wu	Cast won
3	17 November 2017	Wei Daxun (魏大勋), Wei Chen, Roy Wang	Dark Fairytale; Victim: Queen Zhen Dou; Detective:Emma Wu; Ruler of Mango Kingdom: Wei Chen; Princess: Wei Daxun; Dwarf: Sa Beining; Prince of Oppo Kingdom: Roy Wang; Mysterious Guest: He Jiong	He Jiong	Cast Won
4	24 November 2017	Wei Daxun (魏大勋), Wei Chen, Wang Ou	Midnight Hotpot; Victim: Zhen Tang; Detective: He Jiong; Hair salon worker: Emma Wu; Delivery man: Wei Daxun; Long Ge: Sa Beining; Beauty: Wang Ou; Rich Boss: Wei Chen	Wei Chen	Criminal Won Arrested: Emma Wu (Hair Salon Worker Gui)
5	1 December 2017	Wei Chen, Jackson Wang	NZND: Time Has Not Been Kind To Us; Victim: Zhen Youxi; Detective: Wei Chen; Visual: He Jiong; Vocalist (Smiley): Sa Beining; Rapper: Bai Jingting; Top Star: Emma Wu; Ex-Entertainment Reporter: Jackson Wang	Sa Beining	Criminal won Arrested: He Jiong (Visual He)
6	8 December 2017	Wang Ou, Wei Daxun (魏大勋)	Bees of Doomsday; Victim: Zhen Tian, Bao Qingbai; Detective: Wang Ou; Doorkeeper: Sa Beining; Farmer: He Jiong; Employee: Pan Yueming; Biologist: Yang Rong; Botanist: Wei Daxun	Yang Rong	Cast won
7	15 December 2017	Wei Chen, Xiong Ziqi	Unable to Triumph in the Skies Again; Victim:Captain Zhen; Detective: Sa Beining; Co-pilot:He Jiong; Stewardess: Wang Ou; Mechanic: Emma Wu; Executive: Wei Chen; Steward: Xiong Ziqi	Emma Wu	Cast won
8	22 December 2017	Wei Daxun (魏大勋), Wang Ou	Carefree Inn; Victim:Carefree Inn Owner Zhen; Detective: He Jiong; Enthusiastic Guest:Wang Ou; Doctor: Sa Beining; Reader: Bai Jingting; Musician: Wei Daxun; Employee: Pan Yueming	Pan Yueming	Cast won
9	29 December 2017	Wei Daxun (魏大勋), Yan Rujing (颜如晶)	Werewolves: Prequel; Victim:Farmer Zhen; Detective: Bai Jingting; The Strongest Man: He Jiong; Brewer:Sa Beining; Baker: Yan Rujing; Milker: Pan Yueming; Hunter: Wei Daxun	He Jiong	Cast won
10	5 January 2018	Qiao Zhenyu, Yang Rong	Fantasy Dream in Kunlun; Victim:Martial Artist Zhen; Detective: Yang Rong; Li Xiaoyao:Bai Jingting; Sweeping Deity: Sa Beining; Martial Arts Hero: Qiao Zhenyu; Disciple Sister: Emma Wu; Tianyu: He Jiong	He Jiong	Criminal won Arrested: Qiao Zhenyu
11	12 January 2018	Da Zhangwei (大张伟), Yang Rong	Blame for My Beauty! Part 1 Victim: Hospital Director Zhen; Detective:Da Zhangwei; Patient 1: He Jiong; Patient 2: Bai Jingting; Nurse: Yang Rong; Jianbing Stall Owner: Sa Beining; Canteen Cook: Emma Wu	Yang Rong	Cast won
12	19 January 2018	Pan Yueming, Wei Chen	Blame for My Beauty! Part 2 Victims: Detective Da, Nurse Rong, Xiao Ting; Detective:He Jiong; Patient: Bai Jingting; Gua sha practitioner: Pan Yueming; Professional Sleeper: Wei Chen; Jianbing Stall Owner: Sa Beining; Canteen Cook: Emma Wu	Sa Beining	Criminal won Arrested: Patient Bai

=== Season 4 (2018) ===
Episode	Date	Guest(s)	Case Briefing	Criminal	Results
0	26 October 2018	Zhang Ruoyun, Liu Haoran	Detectives' Society; Detectives: He Jiong, Sa Beining, Wang Ou, Bai Jingting, Zhang Ruoyun, Liu Haoran	N/A	N/A
1	2 November 2018	Zhang Ruoyun, Liu Haoran	Escape the Nameless Island: Part 1 Victim: Social Media Writer Zhen Xiangdi; Detective:Sa Beining; Serviceman: He Jiong; Editor: Wang Ou; Shoe Retailer: Bai Jingting; Doctor: Zhang Ruoyun; Leaflet distributor: Liu Haoran	Wang Ou	Cast won
2	9 November 2018	Zhang Ruoyun, Liu Haoran, Wei Daxun	Escape the Nameless Island: Part 2 Victim: Editor Wang Ou; Detective:Sa Beining; Serviceman: He Jiong; Nurse: Wei Daxun; Shoe Retailer: Bai Jingting; Doctor: Zhang Ruoyun; Leaflet distributor: Liu Haoran	He Jiong (murderer), Zhang Ruoyun (mastermind)	Mastermind won (Zhang Ruoyun) Arrested:Bai Jingting
3	16 November 2018	Deng Lun, Justin (黄明昊)	Mysterious Call; Victim: Zhen Jia, Zhen Xiaoyu; Detective:N/A; Math Teacher: He Jiong; Genius Mathematician: Sa Beining; Tour Guide: Wang Ou; Student 1: Gui Gui; Student 2: Deng Lun; Student 3: Justin	Deng Lun, He Jiong	Criminal won Arrested:Sa Beining
4	23 November 2018	Wei Daxun, Justin (黄明昊), Tan Songyun	NZND: Back to the Beginning; Victim: Top trainee Zhen; Detective:Tan Songyun; Visual: He Jiong; All-rounder: Wei Daxun; Rapper: Bai Jingting; Dancer: Justin; Vocalist: Sa Beining	Sa Beining	Criminal won Arrested:Bai Jingting
5	30 November 2018	Zhang Ruoyun, Lin Gengxin	Heaven Apartments; Victim: Author Zhen; Detective:Wang Ou; Rockstar: He Jiong; Internet celebrity: Gui Gui; Unemployed Man: Sa Beining; White collar worker: Zhang Ruoyun; Delivery man: Lin Gengxin	He Jiong, Gui Gui	Criminal won Arrested:Lin Gengxin, Zhang Ruoyun
6	7 December 2018	Tan Songyun, Wei Chen	Just Want To Date; Victim: Actor Zhen; Detective:He Jiong; Screenwriter: Wei Chen; Bartender: Bai Jingting; Actress: Tan Songyun; Karate coach: Wang Ou; Coach's husband: Sa Beining	Sa Beining	Cast won
7	14 December 2018	Wu Xin, Lin Gengxin, Wei Daxun	Secret of the Magic School; Victim: Headmaster Zhen; Detective:Vision Wei; Defence Against the Dark Arts Teacher: Lin Gengxin; Spells Teacher: Wu Xin; Coachman: He Jiong; Divination Teacher: Sa Beining; Cook: Wei Daxun	Wu Xin	Cast won
8	21 December 2018	Tan Songyun, Qiao Zhenyu	The Burnt Rose; Victim: Singer Rose; Detective:Roy Wang; Diamond Singer: Qiao Zhenyu; Jasmine Singer: Wang Ou; Cleaner: Sa Beining; Married Woman: Tan Songyun; Composer: He Jiong	Tan Songyun	Cast won
9	28 December 2018	Ma Li (马丽), Qiao Shan (乔杉), Vision Wei	Home With Kids; Victim: Fiance Zhen; Detective:He Jiong; Father: Sa Beining; Daughter: Gui Gui; Eldest Son: Wei Chen; Second Daughter-in-law: Ma Li; Second Son: Qiao Shan	Ma Li	Cast won
10	4 January 2019	Qiao Xin, Da Zhangwei (大张伟), Justin (黄明昊)	Fantasy Entertainment Resort; Victim: Costume Actor Zhen; Detective:Sa Beining; Ride Manager 1: Qiao Xin; Ride Manager 2: He Jiong; Vampire Actor: Da Zhangwei; Space Ride Manager: Gui Gui; Clown: Justin	Da Zhangwei	Criminal won Arrested: He Jiong
11	11 January 2019	Liu Haoran, Zhang Ruoyun, Xie Na	Number One Player; Victim: Player Zhen; Detective:Liu Haoran; Player 1: Xie Na; Player 2: Bai Jingting; Player 4: Sa Beining; Player 5: He Jiong; Player 6: Zhang Ruoyun	Bai Jingting	Cast won
12	19 January 2019	Liu Haoran, Zhang Ruoyun, Xie Na	Number One Player II; Victim: Various characters Little Cup / Third Boyfriend / Assistant: He Jiong; Little Spoon / Current Boyfriend / Cleaner: Xie Na; Little Pot /Fourth Boyfriend / Receptionist: Sa Beining; Little Bowl / Second Boyfriend / Boss: Bai Jingting; Little Chopstick / Fifth Boyfriend: Liu Haoran; Little Saucepan: Zhang Ruoyun	Bai Jingting, He Jiong, Sa Beining	Criminal won Arrested: Zhang Ruoying, Liu Haoran
13	26 January 2019	Liu Haoran, Zhang Ruoyun, Xie Na	Awards Ceremony; Victim: N/A; Detective:N/A; Attendees: Sa Beining; He Jiong; Bai Jingting; Zhang Ruoyun; Liu Haoran; Xie Na	N/A	N/A

=== Season 5 (2019) ===
Episode	Date	Guest(s)	Case Briefing	Criminal	Results
0	8 November 2019	Zhang Ruoyun, Jing Boran, Jiang Yilei	The Return of the Famous Detectives; Detectives: He Jiong, Sa Beining, Bai Jingting, Zhang Ruoyun, Jing Boran, Jiang Yilei	N/A	N/A
1	15 November 2019	Zhang Ruoyun, Jing Boran, Jiang Yilei	Pianist in the Sea: Part 1 Victim: Pianist Zhen Huitan; Detective:He Jiong; Pianist: Sa Beining; Pianist: Jing Boran; Pianist: Zhang Ruoyun; Pianist: Bai Jingting; Music Critic: Jiang Yilei	Zhang Ruoyun	Cast won
2	22 November 2019	Zhang Ruoyun, Jing Boran, Jiang Yilei	Pianist in the Sea: Part 2 Victim: Black guy Detective: None; Pianist: Sa Beining; Pianist: Jing Boran; Pianist: Zhang Ruoyun; Pianist: Bai Jingting; Music Critic: Jiang Yilei; Captain:He Jiong	He Jiong (20 years old Captain He), Bai Jingting (23 years old Pianist Bai)	Criminals won Arrested: 20 years old Captain He, 25 years old Pianist Sa
3	29 November 2019	Yang Rong, Qi Wei, Neo Hou	Really Cannot Street; Victim: Jia Ming Pai; Detective: Bai Jingting; Landlord: He Jiong; Restaurant Owner: Sa Beining; Electronics Repairer: Yang Rong; Fairy: Qi Wei; Bubble Tea Shop Owner: Neo Hou	Neo Hou	Cast Won
4	6 December 2019	Wei Daxun, Yang Rong, Wei Chen, Neo Hou	Silk Restaurant; Victim: Zhen Jing Jing; Detective: Wei Chen; Restaurant Chef: He Jiong; Restaurant Manager: Sa Beining; Restaurant Waiter: Wei Daxun; Restaurant Waiter: Yang Rong; Restaurant Dishwasher: Neo Hou	Yang Rong	Cast won
5	13 December 2019	Liu Haoran, Wei Daxun, Wang Ou	Crime On The Rooftop; Victim: Insurer Zhen; Detective: Wei Daxun; Freestyle Basketball Player: Sa Beining; Pet Shop Owner: Liu Haoran; Shoe Cleaner: Gui Gui; Neighbor: He Jiong; Cosmetic Saleswoman: Wang Ou	He Jiong	Criminal won Arrested: Sa Beining
6	20 December 2019	Yang Rong, Wu Xin, Fan Chengcheng	NZND Reborn Concert; Victim: Zhen Perfect; Detective: Sa Beining; Pretty Boy: He Jiong; Rapper: Bai Jingting; Rapper: Fan Chengcheng; YCYU Member: Wu Xin; YCYU Member: Yang Rong	Yang Rong	Criminal won Arrested: Wu Xin
7	27 December 2019	Yang Rong, Wei Chen, Justin Huang, Neo Hou	MGQ Magazine's Murder Case; Victim: Chief Editor Zhen; Detective: He Jiong; Couture: Sa Beining; Fashion Staff: Yang Rong; Fashion Staff:Justin Huang; Secretary: Wei Chan; Assistant: Neo Hou	Wei Chen	Cast Won
8	3 January 2020	Justin Huang, Fan Chengcheng	X School's Murder Case; Victim: Teacher Zhen; Detective: Gui Gui; Inventor: Sa Beining; Artist: He Jiong; Principal: Wang Ou; Good Student: Justin Huang; Racecar Driver: Fan Chengcheng	Sa Beining	Criminal won Arrested: Justin
9	10 January 2020	Wei Chen, Justin Huang	Revenge of the Puppet; Victim: Puppet Zhen, Lawyer Zhen; Detective: Wang Ou; Butler: Sa Beining; Clown: He Jiong; Florist: Gui Gui; Carpenter: Wei Chen; Designer: Justin Huang	Gui Gui	Cast Won
10	17 January 2020	Liu Haoran, Wei Chen	Detective Chinatown; Victim: Antique Zhen; Detective: Liu Haoran; Painter: Sa Beining; Teashop Owner: He Jiong; Opera Actress: Gui Gui; Lady: Wang Ou; Private Detective: Wei Chen	Sa Beining	Cast Won
11	24 January 2020	Liu Haoran, Zhang Ruoyun, Wei Chen, Xiao Zhan	Murder on the Slow Northern Train I Victim: Chemist Zhen; Detective: Sa Beining; Motorcyclist: He Jiong; Pretty Woman: Gui Gui; Train Boss: Liu Haoran; Chef: Zhang Ruoyun; Photographer: Wei Chen; Attendant: Xiao Zhan	Wei Chen	Cast Won
12	31 January 2020	Liu Haoran, Zhang Ruoyun, Xiao Zhan	Murder on the Slow Northern Train II; Victim: Hao Chen (Wei Chen); Detective: Sa Beining; Tap Dancer: He Jiong; Pretty Woman: Gui Gui; Attendant: Liu Haoran; Assistant: Zhang Ruoyun; Flutist: Xiao Zhan	Xiao Zhan	Criminal won
12	31 January 2020	Liu Haoran, Zhang Ruoyun, Xiao Zhan	Murder on the Slow Northern Train III; Victim: Zhen Gui (Gui Gui), Hao Zhang (Zhang Ruoyun); Detective: Sa Beining; Attendant: He Jiong; Assistant: Liu Haoran; Train Boss: Zhang Ruoyun; Mercenary: Xiao Zhan	Zhang Ruoyun	Cast won

=== Season 6 (2020) ===
Episode	Date	Guest(s)	Case Briefing	Criminal	Results
1	24–25 November 2020	Bai Jingting, Liu Haoran, Zhang Ruoyun, Yang Rong, Pu Yixing	Midnight Hotel: Part 1 Victim: Investigator Zhen, Hotel Owner Zhen; Detective: Sa Beining, Pu Yixing; Assistant Manager: He Jiong; Doorman: Bai Jingting; Manager: Liu Haoran; Sailor: Zhang Ruoyun; Doorwoman: Yang Rong	Yang Rong	Cast won
2	31 December 2020 – 1 January 2021	Bai Jingting, Liu Haoran, Zhang Ruoyun, Yang Rong, Pu Yixing	Midnight Hotel: Part 2 Victim:Sister Hao, Scientist Jia; Detective: Sa Beining, Pu Yixing; Assistant Manager: He Jiong; Doorman: Bai Jingting; Manager: Liu Haoran; Boatman: Zhang Ruoyun; Doorman: Yang Rong	Pu Yixing	Cast won
3	7–8 January 2021	Da Zhangwei, Zhang Ruoyun, Qi Wei, Zhang Xincheng, Guo Wentao	New Four Talents; Victim: Talented Zhen; Detective: Zhang Ruoyun, Guo Wentao; Bodyguard: He Jiong; Horseman: Sa Beining; Talent: Da Zhangwei; Tea Lady: Qi Wei; New Friend: Zhang Xincheng	Zhang Xincheng	Cast won
4	14–15 January 2021	Wei Daxun, Wei Chen, Zhang Xincheng, Amber Kuo, Guo Wentao	Sky Apartment; Victim: Model Zhen; Detective: He Jiong, Guo Wentao; Fashion: Sa Beining; Bun Seller: Wei Daxun; Secretary: Wei Chen; Front Counter: Zhang Xincheng; Makeup: Amber Kuo	Sa Beining	Cast won
5	21–22 January 2021	Da Zhangwei, Wei Chen, Wu Xin, Zhang Xincheng, He Yunchen	Forget Sadness Grocery Store; Victim: Boss Zhen; Detective: Wei Chen, He Yunchen; Shop Assistant: He Jiong; Masseur: Sa Beining; Egg Painter: Da Zhangwei; Lady: Wu Xin; Musician: Zhang Xincheng	Wu Xin	Cast won
6	27–28 January 2021	Wei Chen, Wu Xin, Wei Daxun, Jin Jing, Li Jinye	Magic Tribe; Victim: Chief Zhen; Detective: Sa Beining, Li Jinye; Hunter: He Jiong; Hairstylist: Wu Xin; Tribal Man: Wei Daxun; Tribal Man: Wei Chen; Tribal Woman: Jin Jing	Wu Xin	Cast won
7	3–4 February 2021	Wei Chen, Ou Wang, Zhang Yujian, Jin Jing, Li Jinye	Hou Llywood; Victim: Zhenyinghou, Sister Hao, Xiaomei Hao; Detective: He Jiong, Li Jinye; Reporter: Sa Beining; Housewife: Ou Wang; Movie Director: Wei Chen; Actress: Jin Jing; Catering Tycoon: Zhang Yujian	Jin Jing	Criminal won Arrested: Wei Chen
8	10–11 February 2021	Justin Huang, Guo Wentao, Da Zhangwei, Jin Jing, Qi Wei	Sad Offer; Victim: Boss Zhen; Detective: Justin Huang, Guo Wentao; Intern: Sa Beining; Intern: Oi Wei; Intern: He Jiong; Intern: Jin Jing; Intern: Da Zhangwei	Qi Wei	Cast won
9	17–18 February 2021	Wei Chen, Pu Yixing, Wei Daxun, Yang Rong, Qi Wei	Still Beautiful To Blame; Victim: President Qi; Detective: Qi Wei, Pu Yixing; Doctor: He Jiong; Patient: Sa Beining; Nurse: Wei Chen; Janitor: Wei Daxun; Patient: Yang Rong	Wei Daxun	Cast won
10	24–25 February 2021	Bai Jingting, Da Zhangwei, Wu Xin, Zhang Xincheng, He Yunchen	NZND-DingNiu Concert; Victim: Zhen Jinhua; Detective: Wu Xin, He Yunchen; Concert Tutor: He Jiong; Concert Tutor: Sa Beining; Concert Guest: Bai Jingting; Concert Uninvited Guest: Da Zhangwei; Concert Mechanical Staff: Zhang Xincheng	He Jiong	Criminal won Arrested: Bai Jingting
11	3–4 March 2021	Wei Daxun, Yang Rong, Wei Chen, Zhang Xincheng, Zhou Junwei	Mang City I Victim: Merchant He; Detective: Wei Daxun, Zhou Junwei; Peking Opera Performer: He Jiong; Military Officer: Sa Beining; Hotel Owner: Yang Rong; Butcher: Wei Chen; Talented Youth: Zhang Xincheng	Wei Chen	Cast won
12	10–11 March 2021	Wang Ou, Bai Jingting, Yang Rong, Wei Chen, Zhang Xincheng	Mang City II; Victim: Zhen Xiaoxiao, Screenwriter Xun, Programmer Zhou; Detective: Wang Ou, Zhang Xincheng; Math Teacher: He Jiong; Worker: Sa Beining; Insurance Agent: Bai Jingting; Doorwoman: Yang Rong; Executive: Wei Chen	Bai Jingting, Wei Chen	Criminal won Arrested: Bai Jingting, Yang Rong

=== Season 7 (2022) ===
Episode	Date	Guest(s)	Case Briefing	Criminal	Results
0	28 January 2022	Qiao Zhenyu, Wu Xin, Da Zhangwei, Yang Rong, Wang Ou, Wei Chen, Qi Wei, Zhang Xincheng	Prior Gathering: Old Detective Friends; Organiser: He Jiong Detectives: Qiao Zhenyu, Wu Xin, Da Zhangwei, Yang Rong, Wang Ou, Wei Chen, Qi Wei, Zhang Xincheng	Wu Xin, Qi Wei	Criminal won Arrested: Wu Xin, Zhang Xincheng
1	10 February 2022	Zhang Ruoyun, Da Zhangwei, Wei Chen, Qi Wei, Yang Rong	Graduate Season of Fairy Tale; Victim: Snowwhite Zhen; Detective: He Jiong; Frog Prince: Zhang Ruoyun; Caveman: Da Zhangwei; Prince Charming: Wei Chen; Ice Queen: Qi Wei; Latin American Girl: Yang Rong	Qi Wei	Cast won
2	17 February 2022	Da Zhangwei, Zhang Ruoyun, Wei Chen, Wang Ou, Wu Xin	Rooftop Apartment; Victim: Building Owner Zhen; Detective: Da Zhangwei; Pharmacist: He Jiong; Mechanic: Zhang Ruoyun; Tech Blogger: Wei Chen; Real Estate Agent: Wang Ou; Pastry Chef: Wu Xin	He Jiong	Criminal won Arrested: Wang Ou
3	24 February 2022	Zhang Ruoyun, Da Zhangwei, Qiao Zhenyu, Wang Ou, Yang Rong	Chancellor Please Light the Lamp; Victim: Chancellor Zhen; Detective: Yang Rong; Scholar: He Jiong; Building Owner: Zhang Ruoyun; Guard: Da Zhangwei; Royal Heir: Qiao Zhenyu; Lady: Wang Ou	Zhang Ruoyun	Cast won
4	3 March 2022	Zhang Ruoyun, Da Zhangwei, Qiao Zhenyu, Yang Rong, Zhang Tianai	Sugar Rush; Victim: Syrup King Zhen; Detective: Qiao Zhenyu; Beverage Shop Owner: He Jiong; Strongman: Zhang Ruoyun; Boss: Da Zhangwei; Beautiful Girl: Zhang Tianai; Syrup Shop Owner: Yang Rong	Da Zhangwei	Cast won
5	10 March 2022	Zhang Ruoyun, Da Zhangwei, Yang Rong, Wu Xin, Deng Lun	Triumph in The Skies: Crossing the Horizon; Victim: Boss K Detective: Wu Xin; Researcher: He Jiong; Game Tester: Zhang Ruoyun; Salesman: Da Zhangwei; Boss: Deng Lun; Programmer: Yang Rong	Yang Rong	Cast won
6	17 March 2022	Zhang Ruoyun, Da Zhangwei, Wei Chen, Justin Huang, Wu Xin	The Wise Elderly Life; Victim: Guardian Zhen; Detective: Wei Chen; Visual: He Jiong; Vocal: Da Zhangwei; Nurse: Zhang Ruoyun; Dancer: Justin Huang; High Note: Wu Xin	Da Zhangwei	Cast won
7	8 April 2022	Zhang Ruoyun, Da Zhangwei, Wang Ou, Wu Xin, Qi Wei	Evil Under the Roses; Victim: Ordinary Zhen, Publisher Da; Detective: Wang Ou, Pu Yixing; Journalist: He Jiong; Publisher: Da Zhangwei; Book Boyfriend: Zhang Ruoyun; Celebrity Author: Qi Wei; Director: Wu Xin	Wu Xin	Cast won
8	14 April 2022	Zhang Ruoyun, Da Zhangwei, Wei Chen, Wang Ou, Justin Huang	The Visitor in Time; Victim: Engineer Zhen; Detective: Da Zhangwei; Homeless Man: He Jiong; Young Man: Zhang Ruoyun; Boss: Wei Chen; Inventor: Wang Ou; Building Owner: Justin Huang	Zhang Ruoyun	Cast won
9	21 April 2022	Zhang Ruoyun, Da Zhangwei, Wei Chen, Wang Ou, Yang Rong	Above the Oasis; Victim: Energy Zhen; Detective: Zhang Ruoyun; Mover: He Jiong; Construction Worker: Da Zhangwei; Security Guard: Wei Chen; Boss: Wang Ou; Tin Can Collector: Yang Rong	Wei Chen, Wang Ou	Cast won
10	28 April 2022	Zhang Ruoyun, Da Zhangwei, Wei Chen, Wang Ou, Qi Wei, Liu Haoran	Winter is Coming; Victim: Castle Owner Zhen; Detective: He Jiong; Doctor: Zhang Ruoyun; Odd Job Worker: Da Zhangwei; Mechanic: Wei Chen; Jasmine Singer: Wang Ou; Fairy: Qi Wei; Cyclist: Liu Haoran	Liu Haoran	Criminal won Arrested: Zhang Ruoyun
11	6 May 2022	Zhang Ruoyun, Da Zhangwei, Wei Chen, Wu Xin, Yang Rong, Liu Haoran	Battle of the DingNiu; Victim: Mathematician Sa; Doctor: He Jiong; Hotel Manager: Zhang Ruoyun; Ghost Hunter: Da Zhangwei; Rich Boss: Wei Chen; Hairstylist: Wu Xin; Doorwoman: Yang Rong; Chinatown Detective: Liu Haoran	Zhang Ruoyun, Da Zhangwei, Liu Haoren	Cast won

=== Season 8 (2023) ===
Episode	Date	Guest(s)	Case Briefing	Criminal	Results
0	19 January 2023	Wei Chen, Wei Daxun, Wang Ou, Yang Rong, Sun Yi, Wang Mian, Wu Xin	Laws of the Jungle: Battle for the Jungle; Joker: Wei Chen; Queen of Clubs: Zhang Ruoyun; Jack of Spades: Wei Daxun; Queen of Spades: He Jiong; King of Hearts: Wang Ou; Jack of Clubs: Yang Rong; Queen of Hearts: Sun Yi; King of Clubs: Wang Mian; Jack of Hearts: Da Zhangwei; King of Clubs: Wu Xin	N/A	Winner: He Jiong; Second place: Wang Ou; Third place: Wang Mian
1	26-27 January 2023	Wang Ou, Wei Chen, Yang Rong	Sunset Horrors Part 1 Victim: Fiery Zhen; Detective: He Jiong; Rockstar: Zhang Ruoyun; Construction Worker: Da Zhangwei; Artist: Wang Ou; Journalist: Wei Chen; Medicine Student: Yang Rong	Zhang Ruoyun	Criminal Won; Arrested: Wei Chen
2	2-3 February 2023	Wang Ou, Wei Chen, Yang Rong, Pu Yixing	Sunset Horrors Part 2 Victim: Killer Jia; Hotel Owner: He Jiong; Hunter: Pu Yixing; Rockstar: Zhang Ruoyun; Construction Worker: Da Zhangwei; Artist: Wang Ou; Journalist: Wei Chen; Medicine Student: Yang Rong	Killer Jia's Consciousness: Yang Rong; Innocent Rong's Consciousness: He Jiong	Criminal Won; Arrested: He Jiong
3	9-10 February 2023	Wei Chen, Wei Daxun, Wu Xin	Leaving The Surface of the Planet; Victim: Space Zhen; Detective: Wei Daxun; Captain: He Jiong; Photographer: Zhang Ruoyun; Refugee: Da Zhangwei; Communications: Wei Chen; Analyst: Wu Xin	Wei Chen	Cast Won
4	16-17 February 2023	Wei Chen, Wei Daxun, Wu Xin	Fly Over the Nuts; Victims: Director Zhen, Former Director Jia; Detective: Wei Chen; Custodian: He Jiong; Patient: Zhang Ruoyun; Patient: Da Zhangwei; Patient: Wei Daxun; Nurse: Wu Xin	Wu Xin	Cast Won
5	23-24 February 2023	Wang Ou, Wei Chen, Yang Rong	Recollection of Former Days; Victims: Sponsor Zhang, Knowledgeable Da, Disguiser Ou, Programmer Chen, Pathologist Rong; Society Head: He Jiong; Sponsor: Zhang Ruoyun; Knowledgeable: Da Zhangwei; Disguiser: Wang Ou; Programmer: Wei Chen; Pathologist: Yang Rong	Zhang Ruoyun	Cast Won
6	2-3 March	Wang Ou, Yin Fang, Sun Yi	Return of Turmoil to Mang City; Victim:Commander Zhen; Detective: Da Zhangwei; Entrepreneur: Wang Ou; General: Zhang Ruoyun; Photographer: Yin Fang; Movie Star: Sun Yi; Foreign Minister: He Jiong	Wang Ou	Cast Won
7	9-10 March	Wei Daxun, Wu Xin, Sun Yi	Black Gold Heist; Victim:Collector Zhen; Detective: Wu Xin; Fried Rice Stall Owner: Da Zhangwei; Butler: Zhang Ruoyun; Painter: Wei Daxun; Ballroom Owner: Sun Yi; Bank Manager: He Jiong	He Jiong	Criminal Won; Arrested: Sun Yi
8	16-17 March	Wang Ou, Yang Rong, Wei Daxun	The Uncanny Event in Mangzhou; Victim:Provincial Inspector Zhen; Detective: He Jiong; Bookstore Owner: Da Zhangwei; Adjutant: Wei Daxun; Persian Merchant: Zhang Ruoyun; Swordsman: Wang Ou; Cloth Shop Proprietress: Yang Rong	Da Zhangwei	Cast Won
9	23-24 March	Yang Rong, Liu Haoran, Justin (黄明昊)	Revenge of the Puppet 3 Victim:Mayor Zhen; Detective: Zhang Ruoyun; Painter: He Jiong; Gardener: Da Zhangwei; Hair Stylist: Justin; Vegetable Farmer: Liu Haoran; Shoemaker: Yang Rong	Liu Haoran	Cast Won
10	30-31 March	Wang Ou, Liu Haoran, Wei Chen	Legend of the Blue Sea; Victim:Village Head Zhen; Detective: Da Zhangwei; Biology Teacher: He Jiong; Seafood Shop Assistant: Wang Ou; Yogurt Shop Owner: Zhang Ruoyun; Delivery Carrier: Liu Haoran; Gold Guard Captain: Wei Chen	He Jiong, Liu Haoran	Criminals Won; Arrested: Wang Ou, Wei Chen
11	6-7 April	Wei Chen, Liu Haoran, Wu Xin	Edge of Day; Victim:President Shi; Detective: Zhang Ruoyun; Student: Da Zhangwei; Hunter: He Jiong; Fishing Village Guard Captain: Wei Chen; Psychological Hypnotist: Liu Haoran; Outdoor Photographer: Wu Xin	Wei Chen	Cast Won
12	13-14 April	Wei Chen, Liu Haoran, Wu Xin, Wei Daxun, Yang Rong	Battle of Tomorrow; Victim:Artist Ou; Society Head: He Jiong; Director of Tianding Group: Zhang Ruoyun; Student: Da Zhangwei; Fishing Village Guard Captain: Wei Chen; Psychological Hypnotist: Liu Haoran; Outdoor Photographer: Wu Xin; Medicine Student: Yang Rong; Shi Lei: Wei Daxun	AI Tiantian Members must choose to follow Society Head He to change past events and make their own choices in Timeline A or follow Director Zhang to stay in utopia through implanted chip in Timeline B The team with more total points accumulated from cases solved wins	Winner: Timeline B team (Zhang Ruoyun, Liu Haoran, Wei Daxun, Wu Xin)

=== Season 9 (2024) ===
Episode	Date	Guest(s)	Case Briefing	Criminal	Results
0	8 February 2024	Wei Chen, Wei Daxun, Yang Rong, Sun Yi, Wu Xin, Justin Huang, Ma Sichun, Zhang You Hao	Earning New Year's Blessings; He Jiong, Da Zhangwei, Wei Chen, Wei Daxun, Yang Rong, Sun Yi, Wu Xin, Justin Huang, Ma Sichun, Zhang You Hao	N/A	Winner: Da Zhangwei; Second place: Zhang You Hao; Third place: Wei Daxun, He Jiong (Tie)
1	14-15 February 2024	Wei Chen, Wei Daxun, Yang Rong	The Silent Three-Headed Lamb Part 1 Victim: Priest Zhen, Tribe Leader Zhen, Qiangzi; Detective: He Jiong; Pilot: Zhang Ruoyun; Doctor: Da Zhangwei; Shop Owner: Wei Chen; Surveyor: Wei Daxun; Makeup Saleswoman: Yang Rong	Wei Daxun	Cast won
2	21-22 February 2024	Wei Chen, Wei Daxun, Yang Rong	The Silent Three-Headed Lamb Part 2 Victim: Villager Guo; Sleep Scientist: He Jiong; Pilot: Zhang Ruoyun; Author: Da Zhangwei; Part-time Worker: Wei Chen; CEO: Wei Daxun; Bun Seller: Yang Rong	Zhang Ruoyun	Cast won
3	28-29 February 2024	Wei Daxun, Wu Xin, Sun Yi	Black Diamond Heist; Victim: Paul Zhen; Detective: Wei Daxun; Traveller: He Jiong; Violinist: Zhang Ruoyun; Wealthy Man: Da Zhangwei; Jewelry Tycoon: Wu Xin; Fortune Teller: Sun Yi	He Jiong	Cast won
4	6-7 March 2024	Yang Rong, Sun Yi, Peng Yuchang	Wonderful Night at the Art Museum; Victim: Zhen Qing; Detective: Yang Rong; Architect: He Jiong; Hurdle Champion: Zhang Ruoyun; Fireman: Da Zhangwei; Doorman: Peng Yuchang; Full-Time Daughter: Sun Yi	Zhang Rouyun	Criminal won Arrested: Da Zhangwei
5	13-14 March 2024	Yang Rong, Wu Xin, Wei Chen, Wei Daxun	Once Upon a Time in Xihui; Victims: Lawyer Zhen, Attorney Fu; Detectives: He Jiong, Zhang Ruoyun; Attorney: Yang Rong; Driver: Da Zhangwei; Flower Shop Owner: Wu Xin; Newspaper Stand Owner: Wei Daxun; Rice Noodle Shop Owner: Wei Chen	Yang Rong, Wu Xin	Cast won
6	20-21 March 2024	Yang Rong, Wu Xin, Zhang You Hao	Breezy Courtyard; Victim: Zhen Mang; Detective: Da Zhangwei; Anchor: He Jiong; Coach: Zhang You Hao; Scriptwriter: Zhang Ruoyun; Caretaker: Wu Xin; Tutor: Yang Rong	Zhang You Hao	Cast won
7	27-28 March 2024	Wu Xin, Wei Chen, Wei Daxun	Crazy Potato; Victim: Village Chief Zhen; Detective: Wei Chen; Radio Host: He Jiong; Reporter: Da Zhangwei; Worker: Zhang Ruoyun; Farmer: Wu Xin; Bathhouse Worker: Wei Daxun	He Jiong	Cast won
8	3-4 April 2024	Wu Xin, Wei Daxun, Zhang You Hao	Golden Storm; Victim: Boss Zhen; Detective: Zhang Ruoyun; Investment Advisor: He Jiong; Spokesperson: Wu Xin; Top Chef: Da Zhangwei; Anchor: Wei Daxun; Fashion Designer: Zhang You Hao	Da Zhangwei	Cast won
9	10-11 April 2024	Wang Ou, Wei Chen, Chen Zheyuan	The School of the Supernatural; Victim: Headmaster Zhen; Detective: He Jiong; Super Strength Student: Zhang Ruoyun; Telekinesis Student: Wang Ou; Telepathy Student: Da Zhangwei; Invulnerability Student: Chen Zheyuan; Student: Wei Chen	Wang Ou, Zhang Ruoyun	Criminals won Arrested: Wang Ou, Wei Chen
10	17-18 April 2024	Wang Ou, Wei Chen, Yang Rong	The Battle of Mountains and Seas; Victims: Sect Leader Zhen, Zhen Xiao Wu; Detective: Da Zhangwei; Shop Owner: He Jiong; Chief Disciple: Zhang Ruoyun; Martial Arts Disciple: Wang Ou; Junior Master of Medicine: Wei Chen; Beggar's Sect Disciple: Yang Rong	Yang Rong	Cast won
11	24-25 April 2024	Wang Ou, Liu Haoran, Yang Rong	Amusement Park Horror; Victim: Security Guard Zhen; Detective: Zhang Ruoyun; Medical Researcher: He Jiong; Game Commentator: Da Zhangwei; Part-Time Worker: Wang Ou; Veterinarian: Liu Haoran; Customer Service: Yang Rong	Yang Rong	Cast won
12	1-2 May 2024	Wang Ou, Wei Chen, Wei Daxun, Liu Haoran, Yang Rong	Shadow Of The City; Victims: Student Sun, Internet Celebrity Su, Boss Gou, Principal Xu, Chairman Dong/"D", Rong Xiaotang; Detective: Zhang Ruoyun; Student: He Jiong; Deliveryman: Da Zhangwei; News Anchor: Wang Ou; Breakfast Shop Owner: Wei Chen; Online Game Companion: Wei Daxun; Street Vendor: Liu Haoran; Multi-Channel Network Boss: Yang Rong	Members must find who killed Rong Xiaotang and "D" Rong Xiaotang's Killer: Wang Ou "D"'s Killer: He Jiong, Liu Haoran	Cast won

=== Season of Memories (2025) ===
Episode	Date	Guest(s)	Case Briefing	Criminal	Results
1	05-6 February 2025	Wang Ou, Wei Chen, Yang Rong, Wu Xin	Filming Short Dramas at ShuLaiWu; Victim: Zhen WangHong; Detective: He Jiong; Racer: Zhang Ruoyun; Actor: Da Zhangwei; Assistant: Wei Chen; Director: Wu Xin; Wardrobe Stylist: Yang Rong; Actor: Wang Ou	Wang Ou, Yang Rong	Criminal won Arrested: Zhang Ruoyun，Wei Chen
2	12-13 February 2025	Wei Chen, Wang Ou, Yang Rong	Escape from the Secret Room; Victim: Zhen HaoHao; Detective: Wang Ou; Guard: Zhang Ruoyun; Programmer: Da Zhangwei; Student: Wei Chen; Bakery Owner: Yang Rong; Real Estate Agency: He Jiong	Zhang Ruoyun	Cast won
3	19-20 February 2025	Wei Daxun, Wu Xin, Wei Chen	Mang Mountain Notes; Victim: Zhen ZhuanJia; Detective: Wei Chen; Live streamer: He Jiong; Shepherd: Zhang Ruoyun; The Heir: Da Zhangwei; Guesthouse Owner: Wu Xin; Surveyor: Wei DaXun	Wei DaXun	Cast won
4	26-27 February 2025	Wang Ou, Wei DaXun, Wei ZheMing	The Night When Meteors Come; Victim: Zhen YiShi; Detective: Zhang Ruo Yun; Unknown: He Jiong; Unknown: Wang Ou; Unknown: Da Zhangwei; Unknown: Wei DaXun; Unknown: Wei ZheMing	He Jiong	Criminal won Arrested: Wei DaXun
5	06, 12 March 2025	Wu Xin, Sun Yi, Wei Daxun	Black Egg Heist; Victims:Zhen FaZe; Detective: Wu Xin; Young Master: He Jiong; Masseur: Da Zhangwei; Gangster: Zhang RuoYun; Worker: Wei Daxun; Club Owner: Sun Yi	Da ZhangWei	Cast won
6	19-20 March 2025	Yang Rong, Wu Xin, Wei Chen	Judgement of Sin; Victim: Zhen JiaoShou; Detective: He Jiong; PhD Student: Da ZhangWei; Investigator: Wei Chen; Doctor: Zhang Ruoyun; PhD Student: Wu Xin; General Manager: Yang Rong	Wu Xin	Cast won
7	26-27 March 2025	Qi Wei, Wei Chen, Wei Daxun	Football Storm; Victim:Zhen LingDui; Detective: Wei DaXun; Captain: He Jiong; Coach: Da Zhangwei; Striker: Zhang Ruoyun; Manager: Qi Wei; Midfielder: Wei Chen	Qi Wei	Cast won
8	2-3 April 2025	Wang Ou, Yang Rong, Liu HaoRan	The Promised MuMa Island; Victim: Xiao Zhen; Detective: Da ZhangWei; Blogger: He Jiong; Writer: Zhang RuoYun; Photographer: Wang Ou; Student: Yang Rong; Artist: Liu Hao Ran	Zhang RuoYun	Criminal won Arrested : Liu HaoRan
9	9-10 April 2025	Wang Ou, Yang Rong, Meng ZiYi	The Legend of Bureau of Palace Affairs; Victim:Zhen GongGong; Detective: He Jiong; Imperial Physician: Zhang Ruoyun; ShangYi: Wang Ou; Top Scholar: Da Zhangwei; ShangYuan: Yang Rong; ShangShi: Meng ZiYi	Da Zhang Wei	Criminal won Arrested: Zhang Ruo Yun
10	17-18 April 2025	Wei DaXun, Wu Xin, Xu YiYang	Crazy Life; Victims: Zhen BaoJian; Detective: Da Zhangwei; PE Teacher: He Jiong; Barbecue chef: Zhang Ruoyun; Journalist: Wu Xin; Administrator: Wei DaXun; Vlog Blogger Xu YiYang	Wu Xin	Criminal won Arrested : Xu YiYang
11	23-24 April 2025	Wang Ou, Wei DaXun, Wei Chen	House of Zhen; Victims: MiaoMiao, Zhen YouXi; Detective: Wei Chen; Boy: He Jiong; Boy: Da Zhangwei; Girl: Wang Ou; Boy: Zhang RuoYun; Boy: Wei DaXun	Wei Chen, He Jiong	Criminal won Arrested : Zhang RuoYun, Wang Ou
12	30 April, 7 May 2025	Wang Ou, Wei Chen, Wei Daxun, Wu Xin, Yang Rong	Dream Hotel; Victim: Zhen JingLi; Detectives: Zhang Ruoyun, Da ZhangWei; Tutor: He Jiong; Wealthy Lady: Wang Ou; Researcher: Wei Chen; Traveler: Wei Daxun; The Heir: Yang Rong; Online shop owner: Wu Xin	Wang Ou	Criminal won Arrested : Wei Chen

=== Season 11 (2026) ===
Episode	Date	Guest(s)	Case Briefing	Criminal	Results
1	18-19 February 2026	Wang An Yu	Treasure Plan I Victim: Unknown; Detective: He Jiong, Zhang Ruo Yun; Unknown: Da Zhang Wei; Unknown: Wang Ou; Unknown: Wei Chen; Unknown: Wei Da Xun; Unknown: Yang Rong; Unknown: Wang An Yu	Wei Chen	Criminal won Arrested: Yang Rong
2	25-26 February 2026	Wang An Yu	Treasure Plan II; Victim: 6 unknown victims Detective: He Jiong, Wei Chen; Investigator: Zhang Ruoyun; Young Master Zhen: Da Zhangwei; Heiress Hao: Wang Ou; Sectary Zhen: Yang Rong; Bandit: Wei Daxun; Villager: Wang An Yu	Yang Rong, Zhang Ruo Yun	Criminal won Arrested: Yang Rong, Wang An Yu
3	04-5 March 2026	Chen Zhe Yuan	The Mystery of Firework Town I Victim: Chui Shao, Bu Zhi Dao; Detective: Da Zhang Wei; University Student: He Jiong; Mother: Wang Ou; Crew member:Wei Chen; Saleswoman: Qi Wei; Teacher: Chen Zhe Yuan	He Jiong	Cast won
4	11-12 March 2026	Chen Zhe Yuan	The Mystery Of Firework Town II; Victim: Zhen Ling Yan; Detective: Wei Chen; Host: He Jiong; Mine Owner: Da Zhang Wei; Factory Manager: Yang Rong; Worshipper: Wu Xin; Manager:Chen Zhe Yuan	Da Zhang Wei	Cast won
5	18-19 March 2026		Seven Days of Shock (I); Victims:unknown; Detective: Wei Chen, Wei Da Xun; Guest: He Jiong; Guest: Da Zhangwei; Guest: Wang Ou; Guest: Yang Rong; Guest: Wu Xin	Yang Rong	Cast won
6	25-26 March 2026	Zhang You Hao	Seven Days of Shock II; Victim: Zhen PD; Detective: Wang Ou, Yang Rong; Extra: He Jiong; Actor: Da Zhang Wei; Producer: Wei Chen; Technical Director: Wu Xin; Intern: Zhang You Hao	Wu Xin	Cast won
7	01-2 April 2026	Lai Wei Ming	The Echo Of the Whale (I); Victim:Zhen Xiao Hai, Zhen Da Lang; Detective: Liu Hao Ran; Student: He Jiong; Student: Da Zhangwei; Student: Wei Da Xun; Student: Qi Wei; Student: Lai Wei Ming	Da Zhang Wei	Cast won
8	08-9 April 2026	Lee Wei Jia	The Siren’s Secret; Victim:Zhen Dao Zhu; Detective: Da ZhangWei; Scholar: He Jiong; ZhuBao: Wang Ou; Witch: Wu Xin; Captain: Liu Hao Ran; Pastier: Lee Wei Jia	Wang Ou	Cast Won
9	15-16 April 2026	Chen Zhe Yuan, Wang Mian	Black Car Heist; Victim:Zhen Xiao Qiang; Detective: Wei Da Xun; Big Brother Hao: He Jiong; Little Brother Hao: Da Zhang Wei; Little Sister Hao: Wu Xin; Elder father Hao: Chen Zhe Yuan; Younger father Hao: Wang Mian	Chen Zhe Yuan	*According to the special rule for this episode, the detective and the criminal lost; the other casts won
10	22-23 April 2026	Chen Zhe Yuan	Black Room Heist; Victim:Zhen Hu Wei; Detective: He Jiong; Mayor: Wei Chen; Service Centre Boss: Da Zhang Wei; Nurse: Wu Xin; Convenience store Manager: Chen Zhe Yuan; Director of Security: Wei Da Xun	Wei Da Xun	Cast won
11	29-30 April 2026		Sunset Archives: The Final Party; Victim:Zhen Miao; Detective: Da ZhangWei; Novelist: He Jiong; Designer: Zhang Ruo Yun; Blogger: Yang Rong; Editor: Wei Da Xun; University Student: Liu Hao Ran	Wei Da Xun	Cast won
12	6-7 May		Sunset Archives: The Dream Cinema; Victim:6 unknown victims Detective: Wang Ou, Wei Chen; Young Master: He Jiong; Rapper: Da ZhangWei; Drummer: Zhang Ruo Yun; Manager: Yang Rong; Youth: Wei Da Xun; Infected Person: Wu Xin; Maths Teacher: Liu Haoran	He Jiong	Criminal won Arrested: Zhang Ruo Yun, Yang Rong

== Controversies ==
The second episode of Season 3 was pulled 30 minutes before its September 29 release on Mango TV, with the crew citing the need to "optimize the plot." It was re-released on November 3.

Season 7 Episode 6, originally "Revenge of the Puppet 2," was canceled due to Deng Lun's tax evasion scandal. Format "The Wise Elderly Life" was aired instead.

In Season 7 Episode 6, a joke by He Jiong about Justin Huang sparked controversy on Weibo. The show called it a misinterpretation and took legal action.
