= Byeng Dong Youn =

South Korean mechanical engineer

- 윤병동
- Citizenship: South Korea
- Education: Inha University (BS); KAIST (MS); University of Iowa (PhD)
- Known for: Reliability-based design optimization; prognostics and health management
- Awards: Fellow, PHM Society (2019); Member, National Academy of Engineering of Korea (2022)
- Scientific career
- Fields: Mechanical engineering Prognostics and health management Reliability engineering
- Workplaces: Seoul National University; University of Maryland, College Park; Michigan Technological University

Byeng Dong Youn (Korean: 윤병동) is a South Korean mechanical engineer and academic. He is a professor in the School of Mechanical Engineering at Seoul National University, where he directs the Hyperautonomy Artificial Intelligence Laboratory, and is the founder and chief executive officer of ONEPREDICT, an industrial artificial intelligence company he established in 2016.

Youn works on reliability-based design optimization, prognostics and health management (PHM), and the combination of physics-based models with machine learning for industrial diagnostics. His publications have been cited more than 16,000 times, giving him an h-index of 61. He was named a Fellow of the PHM Society in 2019 and became a member of the National Academy of Engineering of Korea in 2022.

== Education and career ==
Youn received a Bachelor of Science degree from Inha University in 1996, a Master of Science degree from KAIST in 1998, and a Ph.D. from the University of Iowa in 2001, all in mechanical engineering.

He was a research associate at the University of Iowa from 2002 to 2004, an assistant professor at Michigan Technological University from 2005 to 2007, and an assistant professor at the University of Maryland, College Park from 2007 to 2010. He joined Seoul National University as an assistant professor in 2010, was promoted to associate professor in 2012 and to full professor in 2017, and served as associate chair of the School of Mechanical and Aerospace Engineering from 2016 to 2018.

Youn was the founding president of the Korean Society of Prognostics and Health Management. He has served as a technical adviser to Korean industrial firms including Samsung Electronics, Hyundai Motor, LG Electronics and LG Energy Solution, and chairs Hyundai Motor's reliability advisory committee.

He is a senior review editor of the journal Structural and Multidisciplinary Optimization, a position he has held since 2017, and sits on the editorial board of Machine Learning: Engineering. He previously served on the editorial board of the International Journal of Precision Engineering and Manufacturing from 2018 to 2020.

== Research ==
Youn's early work addressed reliability-based design optimization, including methods for quantifying uncertainty in nonlinear engineering design problems.

He subsequently worked on prognostics and health management, developing methods for estimating the remaining useful life of industrial components such as wind turbine planetary gearboxes and for estimating the state of charge and capacity of lithium-ion batteries. A 2015 review he co-authored on the physics of failure and prognostics of insulated-gate bipolar transistor modules has been widely cited. His group has also published on piezoelectric energy harvesting using defect modes of phononic crystals.

His more recent research combines deep learning with physics-based domain knowledge to address data imbalance and domain shift in industrial fault detection. Teams led by Youn have repeatedly placed first in international PHM data competitions; a 2019 report noted nine wins in competitions organised by bodies including the IEEE over the preceding five years.

At the time of his election as a PHM Society Fellow in 2019, the society recorded that he had published more than 100 journal papers and over 400 conference papers and had given more than 150 invited talks. He has supervised 37 doctoral and 36 master's students, sixteen of whom have gone on to faculty positions at institutions including the University of Illinois Urbana-Champaign, Rutgers University, the University of Maryland, College Park and the University of Connecticut.

== ONEPREDICT ==
Youn founded ONEPREDICT, a Seoul-based industrial artificial intelligence company, in 2016 and serves as its chief executive officer. The company develops software marketed under the name Guardione that analyses sound, vibration and temperature data from industrial equipment to detect anomalies and predict remaining life. Its customers include GS Caltex, S-Oil, Lotte Chemical and GS Power. ONEPREDICT raised US$25 million in a Series C round in 2022 and later established a subsidiary in the United States.

== Awards and honours ==
- Young Faculty Development Award, U.S. Nuclear Regulatory Commission (2009)
- Sinyang Academic Award, Seoul National University (2017)
- Citation of the Prime Minister of South Korea (2019)
- Fellow, PHM Society (2019)
- Ministerial awards from the Ministry of Trade, Industry and Energy and the Ministry of SMEs and Startups (2021)
- Member, National Academy of Engineering of Korea (2022)
- Author Service Award, Springer Nature Editor of Distinction Awards (2025)

== Selected publications ==
- Youn, Byeng Dong; Choi, Kyung K.; Park, Young Ho (2003). "Hybrid Analysis Method for Reliability-Based Design Optimization". Journal of Mechanical Design. 125 (2): 221–232. doi:10.1115/1.1561042.
- Hu, Chao; Youn, Byeng Dong; Chung, Jaesik (2012). "A Multiscale Framework with Extended Kalman Filter for Lithium-Ion Battery SOC and Capacity Estimation". Applied Energy. 92: 694–704. doi:10.1016/j.apenergy.2011.08.002.
- Oh, Hyunseok; Han, Bongtae; McCluskey, Patrick; Han, Changwoon; Youn, Byeng Dong (2015). "Physics-of-Failure, Condition Monitoring, and Prognostics of Insulated Gate Bipolar Transistor Modules: A Review". IEEE Transactions on Power Electronics. 30 (5): 2413–2426. doi:10.1109/TPEL.2014.2346485.
