= Golden Eagle Award for Best Supporting Actor (China) =

Chinese TV award

Golden Eagle Award for Best Supporting Actor also known as Best Performance by an Actor in a Supporting Role(Chinese name:中国电视金鹰奖最佳男配角,1983–1999). Since 2001, the category was retired. Until 2022, this category will be awarded again.

== Winners and nominees ==
=== 2020s ===
Year	Number	Actor	Television Series
2026	33rd	Zhu Yawen 朱亚文	Swords Into Plowshares 太平年
2026	33rd	Wang Jinsong 王劲松	Position 阵地
2026	33rd	Li Guangjie 李光洁	Born to Be Alive 生命树
2026	33rd	Lin Yongjian 林永健	This Thriving Land 生万物
2026	33rd	Jiang Qiming 蒋奇明	Escape from the Trilateral Slopes 边水往事
2026	33rd	Fu Dalong 富大龙	We Are Criminal Police 我是刑警
2024	32nd	Wang Jingchun 王景春	Ordinary Greatness 警察荣誉
2024	32nd	Qin Hao 秦昊	The Long Season 漫长的季节
2024	32nd	Wang Xiao 王阳	Bright Future 县委大院
2024	32nd	Li Naiwen 李乃文	Always On The Move 南来北往
2024	32nd	Zhang Xincheng 张新成	Bright Future 县委大院
2024	32nd	Dong Yong 董勇	Blossoms Shanghai 繁花
2022	31st	Ma Shaohua 马少骅	Awakening Age 觉醒年代
2022	31st	Wang Yang 王阳	The Rebel 叛逆者
2022	31st	Li Naiwen 李乃文	Qin Dynasty Epic 大秦赋
2022	31st	Liu Yijun 刘奕君	Reset 开端
2022	31st	Cheng Taishen 成泰燊	People's Justice 巡回检查组
2022	31st	Yang Shuo 杨烁	Like a Flowing River 2 大江大河2

=== 2000s ===
Year	Number	Actor	Television Series
2000	18th	Guo Donglin 郭冬临	Palace of Desire\大明宫词
2000	18th	Wang Zhifei 王志飞	Protruding Tight Encirclement\突出重围
2000	18th	Li Youbin 李幼斌	Criminal Police\刑警本色

=== 1990s ===
Year	Number	Actress	Television Series
1999	17th	Jiao Huang 焦晃	Yongzheng Dynasty\雍正王朝
1999	17th	Yan Zhicheng 严志成	To Lead by the Hand\牵手
1999	17th	Wang Huichun 王绘春	Yongzheng Dynasty\雍正王朝

Year	Winner	For
1998	Li Sheng 李升	The Years with Zhou Enlai 与周恩来同窗的岁月
1997	Qi Mengshi 奇梦石	The Family and Love 儿女情长
1996	Wang Gang 王刚	Prime Minister Liu Luoguo 宰相刘罗锅
1995	Chen Qiang 陈强	Fei Lai Heng Fu 飞来横福
1994	Liu Xiao Ling Tong 六小龄童	Kids of Monkey 猴娃
1993	Wang Zhiwen 王志文	Sections of Forbidden City 皇城根儿
1992	Xie Yuan 谢园	Shanghai Family 上海一家人
1991	Sun Song 孙松	Hope 渴望
1990	Qi Mengshi 奇梦石	Shanghai Morning 上海的早晨

=== 1980s ===
Year	Winner	For
1989	Chen Yude 陈裕德	18 Years Old Man 十八岁的男子汉
1988	Shen Junyi 申军谊	乌龙山剿匪记
1987	Wang Qun 王群	Zhen San 甄三
1986	Xu Yajun 许亚军	Finding World 寻找回来的世界
1985	Lv Yi 吕毅	Snowstorm Tonight 今夜有暴风雪
1984	Tong Ruimin 佟瑞敏	Hua Luogeng 华罗庚
1983	not awarded this year	
