= Kim Tae-hwan =

Kim Tae-hwan or Kim Thae-hwan may refer to:

- Kim Tae-hwan (footballer, born 1989), South Korean football player
- Kim Tae-hwan (curler) (born 1990), South Korean male curler
- Kim Tae-hwan (actor) (born 1992), South Korean actor and model
- Kim Tae-hwan (footballer, born 2000), South Korean football player
