= Zhang Xincheng =

Chinese actor (born 1995)

- 张新成
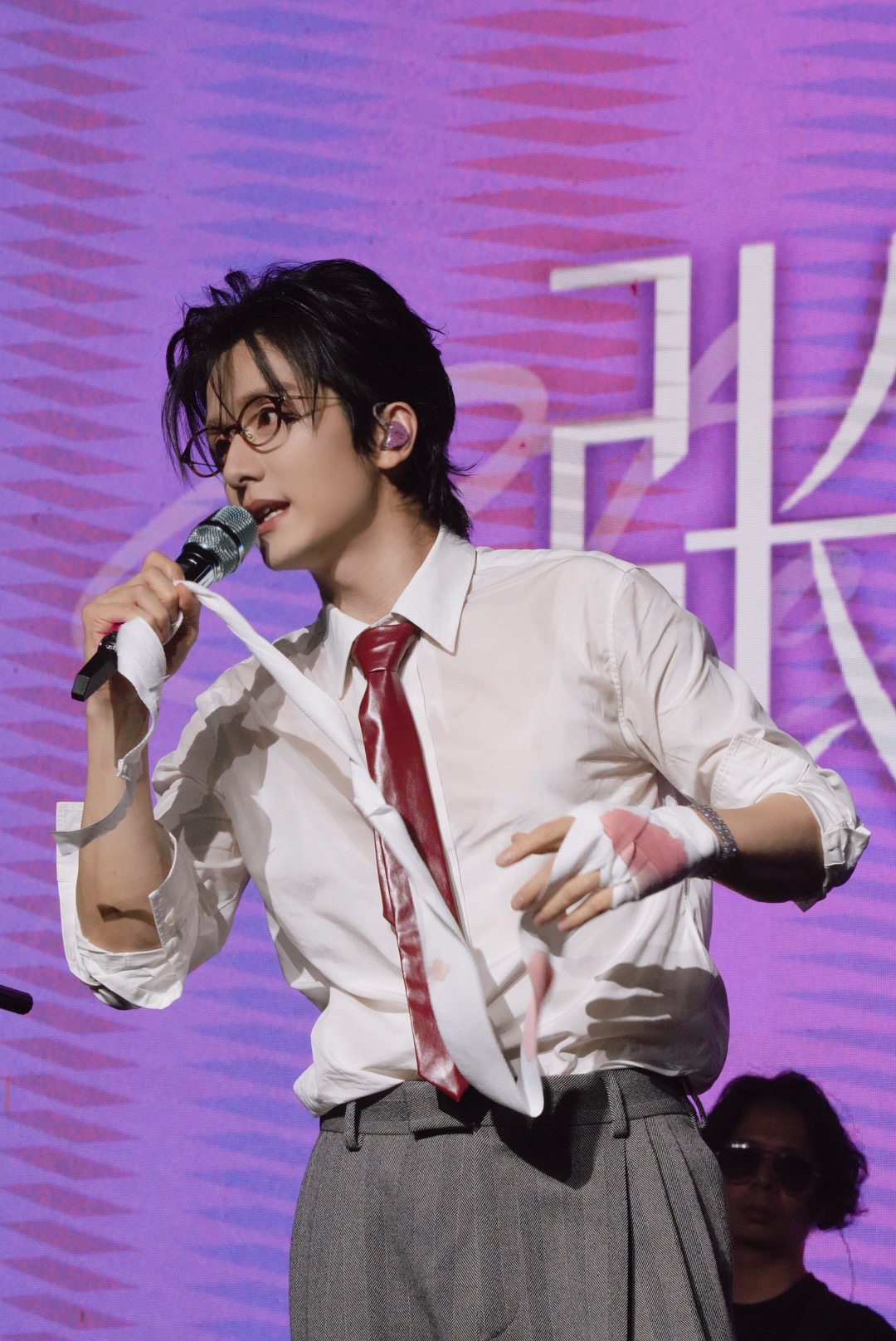
- Zhang's first concert performance on August 23, 2025
- Born: August 24, 1995 (age 31); Jingzhou, Hubei, China
- Other name: Steven Zhang
- Education: Central Academy of Drama
- Occupations: Actor; singer
- Years active: 2013–present
- Agents: Zhang Xincheng Studio (张新成工作室); Tencent Music (music)

Zhang Xincheng (Chinese: 张新成, born 24 August 1995), also known by his English name Steven Zhang, is a Chinese actor, singer, and model. His first major role was that of Lin Yang in the campus web series My Huckleberry Friends (2017). Zhang is best known for his roles as Li Yubing in the sports drama Skate into Love and He Ziqiu in the family drama Go Ahead, both of which aired in 2020 and garnered him several awards for his work that year.

== Early life ==
Zhang was born and raised in Jingzhou, Hubei, China. He aspired to be a professional dancer as a child and eventually moved to Beijing in 2008 to attend the Affiliated Secondary School of the Beijing Dance Academy. Zhang notably placed first in college entrance examinations in 2014 for several courses offered by top performing arts colleges in China such as the Central Academy of Drama, Beijing Film Academy, People's Liberation Army Academy of Art, and Shanghai Theatre Academy. He subsequently attended the Central Academy of Drama and graduated with a bachelor's degree in musical theatre.

== Career ==
In 2013, Zhang made his acting debut in the short film School Bus.

In 2014, he released two singles: "Be Here for You" as the soundtrack to the film The Story of He Jinye, and the following year he released "Believe Love Still Exists" as the soundtrack to the web series Heartbreak Emergency Department. He went on to star in several short films and signed with the entertainment company EE-Media in 2015.

In 2016, Zhang starred in his first television drama Shuttle Love Millennium, where he gained attention for his performance.

In 2017, Zhang starred in the campus web series My Huckleberry Friends. He won the award of "Drama Newcomer of the Year" at the iQIYI Scream Night for his performance.

In 2018, Zhang starred in the esports drama The Strongest Men of God.

In 2019, Zhang starred in the youth historical drama Young Blood.

In 2020, Zhang starred in the hit sports romance drama Skate into Love, alongside Janice Wu, portraying a collegiate ice hockey player. He then co-starred with Lin Yun in the music romance drama Symphony's Romance, adapted from the Japanese manga Nodame Cantabile, in which he played a genius conductor. Zhang also starred in and helped produce the slice-of-life family drama Go Ahead. Forbes China listed him in their 30 Under 30 list for 2020 which consisted of 30 influential people under 30 years old who have had a substantial effect in their fields.

In 2021, Zhang participated in the sixth season of Who's the Murderer. On February 28, he was awarded Weibo's Enterprising Artist of the Year at the 2020 Sina Weibo Night in Shanghai. In May, he began filming for the series Justice In The Dark, in which he co-starred with Fu Xinbo. On June 17, the romantic comedy The Day of Becoming You, starring Zhang and Liang Jie, was aired. On September 8, the commercial war drama of the Republic of China The Justice, starring Zhang alongside Cai Wenjing and Zhang Zhijian, was broadcast on Hunan Satellite TV. In December, he joined the 2021–2022 Hunan Satellite TV New Year's Eve Gala, and performed "Red Ling" with Chinese music artist Fang Jinlong at the New Year's Eve Party.

In 2022, Zhang participated in the 7th season of Who's the Murderer. On May 16, he began filming for Bright Future, in which he played Lin Zhiwei. On May 20, he released his first single "Talking to Myself". On June 15, The Murder in Kairoutei was broadcast. On July 22, The Heart of Genius was broadcast. In early August, he co-starred with Sun Qian in the film All These Years, adapted from the novel of the same name by Ba Yue Chang An. On September 10, he participated in The Moon Knows Me – Cloud Gala, performing a poetry recitation about stars. On September 29, Young Blood 2 began filming, in which he played the main character Yuan Zhongxin. On December 7, Bright Future was broadcast.

In 2023, he participated in the show Our Inn as a partner. On April 8, Created in China, a drama adapted from the novel by A Nai, started filming. He played the leading role of Liu Jun. On April 28, the film All These Years premiered. On April 18, the music video for "Time Shattered", which is the theme song of All These Years, was released. On May 18, he appeared in Back to Field Season 7. On June 16, the film Elemental, in which he participated as the main voice actor, premiered in mainland China. On July 29, Young Blood 2 was aired. On August 22, he appeared in the Mango TV reality show Young Blood Detectives. On September 14, the show Delicious Intangible Cultural Heritage premiered. On December 15, the film Endless Journey, in which he played Qin Zhe, was released. On December 24, the drama Coming to Myself, in which played the main role Yin Feng/You Yingjun, began filming. That same day, his show Get In the Car Now and Let's Go Travel, premiered. On December 31, he performed the song "What Dreams Are Like" at the Dreams Come True: 2024 Dragon TV New Year's Gala.

In 2024, he attended the AMI Paris Fall/Winter 2024 show during Paris Fashion Week in January. He performed in 2024 China Online Audiovisual Annual Gala. On February 9, he performed at the 2024 CCTV Spring Festival Gala. From May to July, he became a new resident of in season 4 of the reality show Fifty Kilometers Taohuawu. On May 25, he appeared in the variety show National Treasures Season 4 as a guest. From September 15 to October 6, he participated in the music competition show Our Song (Season 6). On September 23, You Are My Lover Friend, in which he played the lead Jiang Shiyan, was released on Tencent Video. On December 20, the drama Southern Archives, in which he played the leading role Zhang Haiyan, began filming in Hengdian.

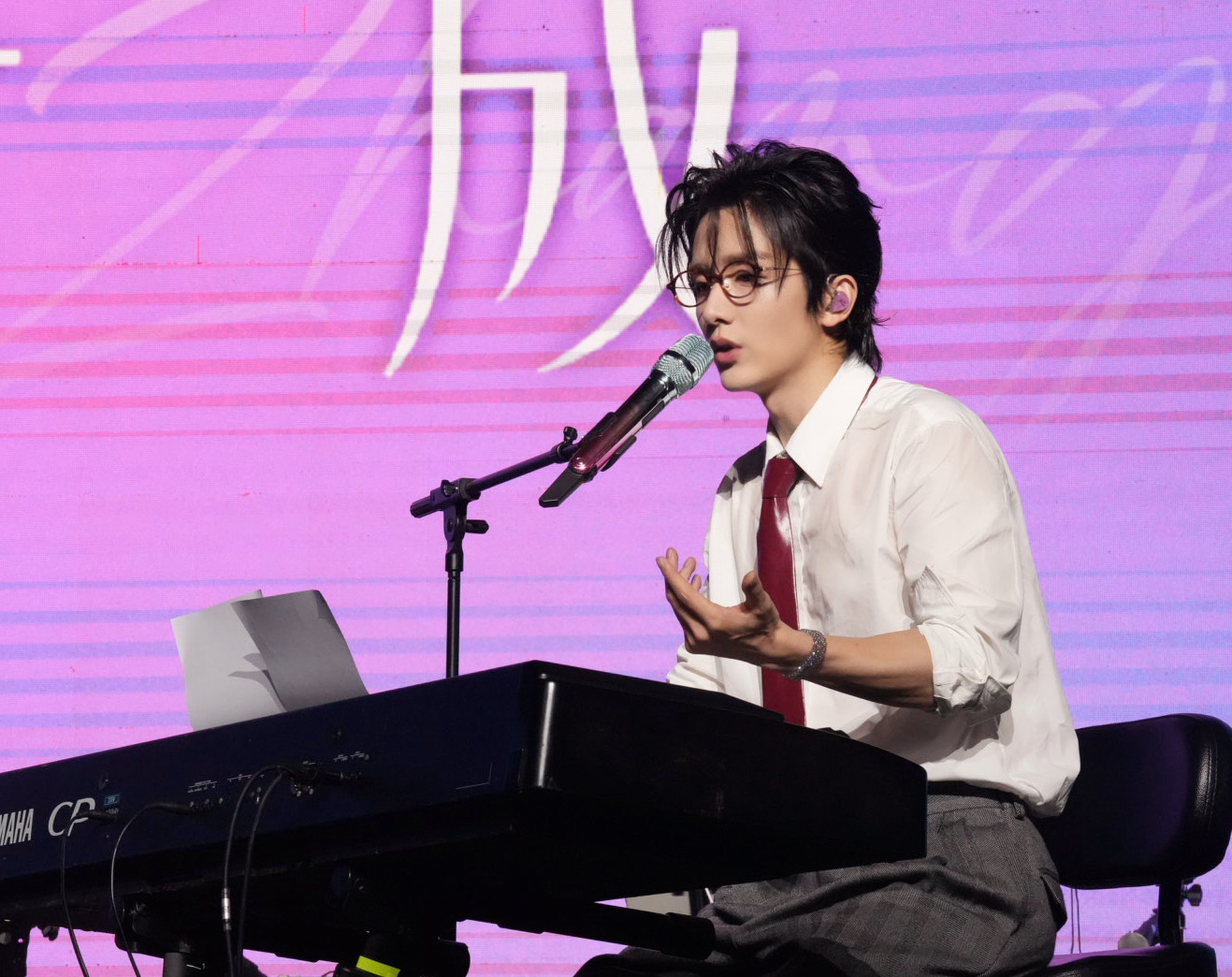
Zhang performing in 2025

In 2025, he performed the song "Happy New Year" at the 2025 CCTV Spring Festival Gala. On January 29, he sang "Wishing You Happiness Year After Year" at the 2025 Beijing TV Spring Festival Gala. On April 17, filming for Southern Archives wrapped in Hainan. On May 16, the music show The Treasured Voice Season 6, in which he participated, aired. On June 6, he performed as Su Shi in the musical To the East the Great River Flows at Beijing Tianqiao Performing Arts Center. On June 12, the sci-fi TV series The Stars, which he played the leading role Guo Yuan, started filming in Chengdu. On June 18, Created in China was broadcast on CCTV-1. On August 23, he held his first solo concert and 30th birthday fan meeting in Shanghai, with tickets selling out instantly. On August 24, he released his first solo album Maladaptation. On September 25, he attended the BOSS fashion show during Milan Fashion Week. On October 7 and 9, he performed the musical To the East the Great River Flows in Shanghai. In October, he started filming The Mystery of Qin.

== Filmography ==
=== Films ===
Year	English title	Chinese title	Role	Notes/Ref.
2013	School Bus	校车	Han Yuyang	Short film
2014	Fool	傻瓜	Yang Sensen	Short film
2014	The Winter of Seventeen	冬日十七岁	Yang Yunfeng	Short film
2017	Chosen	活到最后		Short film
2017	Intelligent Machines Girlfriend	贴身萌妹腹黑计划	Cui Ze	Web film
2023	All These Years	这么多年	Li Ran	His first role in a full-length film
2023	Elemental	疯狂元素城	Wade Ripple	Dubbed in the mainland Chinese version
2023	Endless Journey	三大队	Qin Zhe	
2024	The Wild Robot	荒野机器人	Fink	Dubbed in the mainland Chinese version
2025	Detective Chinatown 1900	唐探1900	Bai Zhenbang	
2026	Pegasus 3	飞驰人生3	Li Lun	

=== Television series ===
Year	English title	Chinese title	Role	Network	Notes/Ref.
2016	Shuttle Love Millennium	相爱穿梭千年2：月光下的交换	Li Hailun	Hunan TV	
2017	My Huckleberry Friends	你好，旧时光	Lin Yang	iQIYI	
2018	The Strongest Men of God	最强男神	Wu Zewen	Youku	
2019	Young Blood	大宋少年志	Yuan Zhongxin	Hunan TV, Mango TV, iQIYI	
2020	Skate into Love	冰糖炖雪梨	Li Yubing	Jiangsu TV, Zhejiang TV, Youku	
2020	Symphony's Romance	蜗牛与黄鹂鸟	Li Zhenyan	Hunan TV	
2020	Go Ahead	以家人之名	He Ziqiu	Hunan TV	
2021	The Day of Becoming You	变成你的那一天	Jiang Yi	iQIYI	
2021	Refinement of Faith	百炼成钢	Jiao Yulu	Hunan TV	
2021	The Justice	光芒	Cheng Yizhi	Hunan TV	
2022	The Murder in Kairoutei	回廊亭	Cheng Cheng	Youku	
2022	The Heart of Genius	天才基本法	Pei Zhi	CCTV-8, iQIYI	
2022	Bright Future	县委大院	Lin Zhiwei	CCTV-1, Tencent Video, Migu	
2023	Young Blood II	大宋少年志2	Yuan Zhongxin	Hunan TV, Mango TV	
2024	Tender Light	微暗之火	Zhou Luo	CCTV-8, Youku	
2024	You Are My Lover Friend	舍不得星星	Jiang Shiyan	Tencent Video	
2025	Me and my Family	180天重启计划	Lao Yuan	Hunan TV, Mango TV	Cameo
2025	Justice in the Dark	光·渊	Pei Su	Youku, WOWOW	
2025	Created in China	淬火年代	Liu Jun	CCTV-1, iQIYI, Tencent Video	
2026	Archives: The Nanyang Mystery	南部档案	Zhang Haiyan / Zhang Hailou	iQIYI	
TBA	Coming to Myself	待我醒来时	Yin Feng / You Yingjun	Tencent Video	
TBA	The Stars	群星	Guo Yuan	Tencent Video	
TBA	The Unseen Qin Empire	秦谜	Mi Yuan	iQIYI	

=== Variety shows ===
Year	English title	Chinese title	Role	Notes/Ref.
2020	Little Forest	奇妙小森林	Cast member	
2021	Who's the Murderer Season 6	明星大侦探6	Guest	
2022	Who's the Murderer Season 7	明星大侦探7	Guest	
2023	Our Inn	我们的客栈	Cast member	
2023	Back to Field Season 7	向往的生活	Guest	
2023	Young Blood Detectives	大宋探案局	Cast member	
2023	Delicious Intangible Cultural Heritage	好吃的非遗	Cast member	
2023	Get In the Car Now And Let's Go Travel	此刻，向远方——朋友请上车	Cast member	
2024	National Treasures Season 4	国家宝藏	Guest	
2024	Fifty Kilometers Taohuawu	五十公里桃花坞	Cast member	
2024	Our Song Season 6	我们的歌6	Guest	
2025	The Treasured Voice Season 6	天赐的声音6	Guest	

== Discography ==
Year	English title	Chinese title	Notes/Ref.
2014	"Be Here for You"	等你擦肩	The Story of He Jinye OST
2015	"Believe Love Still Exists"	相信爱，还存在	Heartbreak Emergency Department OST
2018	"Cheer for Youth"	打Call青春	
2019	"What Dreams Are Like"	梦想的模样	Young Blood OST
2020	"A Ray of Hope"	曙光	Skate into Love OST
2020	"Tempting Heart"	心动	Skate into Love OST
2020	"Heart Warms Heart Equals the World"	心暖心等于世界	
2020	"Hand in Hand"	手足	Charity song for those who fought against the COVID-19 pandemic
2021	"My Soul"		The Day of Becoming You OST
2021	"Brilliant"	光芒	The Justice OST
2021	"Glimmer"	微光	The Justice OST
2022	"A Secret About You"	与你有关的秘密	Promotional song for When You Be Me
2022	”Talking To Myself"	自言自语	First single
2023	"Abyss"	深渊	Justice in the Dark OST
2023	"Shattered Time"	时间碎了	All These Years OST
2023	"Stay With Me" (with Ju Jingyi)	伴 / Stay With Me	Rising With the Wind OST
2024	"Let the misty rain fall"	一蓑烟雨	Promotional song for the musical Da Jiang Dong Qu
2024	"Stargazing" (with Tia Ray)	看星星	You Are My Lover Friend OST
2025	"Nice to Meet You" (with Galaxy Express)	亿颗原子的距离	Single
2025	"Unrequited Love"	安慰奖	Single
2025	“To the East the Great River Flows“	大江东去	Musical; played the main role Su Shi
2025	"Maladaptation"	不适应症	First album
2026	"Lone Night"	孤光	Archives: The Nanyang Mystery OST
2026	"Flow Through Endless Years"	漫过无尽岁月	Archives: The Nanyang Mystery OST
2026	"Unfailing Redemption"	未缺席的救赎	Inseparable OST

== Awards and nominations ==
Year	Awarding Body/Event	Category	Nominated work	Result	Ref.
2017	7th iQIYI Scream Night	Drama Newcomer of the Year	—N/a	Won	
2019	"Praise The New Era"; New Youth Model Artist Glory Ceremony	New Youth Role Model Artist	—N/a	Won	
2020	7th The Actors of China Awards	Excellent Actor (Emerald Award/Green Group)	—N/a	Won	
2020	Forbes China	Forbes 30 Under 30 (Entertainment and Sports)	—N/a	Won	
2020	GQ Men of the Year (China)	Popular Actor of the Year	—N/a	Won	
2020	2020 Sohu Fashion Awards	National Drama Male Star of the Year	—N/a	Nominated	
2021	2020 Weibo Awards	Enterprising Actor of the Year	—N/a	Won	
2021	2021 China TV Drama Awards	Outstanding Actor of the Year	The Justice	Won	
2022	35th Huading Awards	Best Actor in Chinese Modern Dramas	The Justice	Nominated	
2023	CMG 1st Chinese TV Drama Annual Ceremony	Breakthrough Actor of the Year	Bright Future	Nominated	
2023	1st "New Horn" TV Drama Director's Night	Breakthrough Actor of the Year	—N/a	Won	
2023	2023 Television Series of China Quality Ceremony	Quality Drama Star with Full Media Attention	—N/a	Won	
2023	2023 Sohu Fashion Awards	Fashion Influential Male Artist of the Year	—N/a	Won	
2024	2024 QQ Music Awards	Peak Heat Male Singer of the Year	—N/a	Won	
2024	37th Hundred Flowers Awards	Best Newcomer	Endless Journey	Nominated	
2024	32nd China TV Golden Eagle Award	Best Supporting Actor	Bright Future	Nominated	
2024	2024 Weibo TV & Internet Video Summit	Expressive Actor of the Year	—N/a	Won	
2024	2024 Tencent Video All Star Night	Leaping Artist of the Year	—N/a	Won	
2024	2024 Weibo Awards	Expressive Actor of the Year	Tender Light; You Are My Lover Friend	Won	
2025	22nd Movie Channel Media Awards	Most Media-Anticipated New Actor of the Year	Detective Chinatown 1900	Won	
2025	21st Chinese American Film Festival and TV Festival	Golden Angel Awards – Outstanding Actor	Tender Light	Won	
