= My Amazing Boyfriend =

- Promotional poster
- Also known as: My Wonderful Boyfriend
- Genre: Romantic comedy Fantasy
- Written by: Shui Qianmo; Wang Xiongcheng
- Directed by: Deng Ke
- Starring: Janice Wu; Kim Tae-hwan (Season 1); Esther Yu; Mike Angelo (Season 2)
- Country of origin: China
- Original language: Mandarin
- No. of seasons: 2
- No. of episodes: 28 (Season 1); 38 (Season 2)

Production
- Running time: 45 mins
- Production companies: Zhejiang Huace Film & TV

Original release
- Network: Tencent
- Release: 24 April – 1 June 2016

My Amazing Boyfriend (Chinese: 我的奇妙男友; pinyin: Wo De Qi Miao Nan You) is a 2016 Chinese web series starring Janice Wu and Kim Tae-hwan, in a romance story between a 500 year old superhuman and a B-list actress. The series is an adaptation of a popular Chinese novel by Shui Qianmo. It aired online via Tencent from 24 April to 1 June 2016. The second season premiered on February 14, 2019, with Mike Angelo and Esther Yu replacing Kim Tae-hwan and Janice Wu as the lead stars.

== Synopsis ==
Xue Ling Qiao (Kim Tae Hwan), an otherworldly being who has been asleep for a century, is accidentally awakened by Tian Jing Zhi (Janice Wu), who is forced to share her home with this awkward man with super powers. From bickering to eventually warming up to each other, unlikely romance blossoms between them, but will a cosmic conspiracy keep them apart?

== Cast ==
=== Season 1 ===
- Janice Wu as Tian Jingzhi
- Kim Tae-hwan as Xue Lingqiao
- Shen Mengchen as Zhang Xuanxuan
- Fu Jia as Li Yanzhi
- Xu Ke as Ye Chen
- Li Xinliang as Hong Shiguang
- Yang Yifei as Feng Dongdong
- Lily Tien as Tian Jingzhi's mother

=== Season 2 ===
- Yu Shuxin as Tian Jingzhi
- Mike Angelo as Xue Lingqiao
- Li Geyang as Yun Zhen
- Tian Yitong as Ye Meixiao
- Fu Jia as Li Yan Zhi
- Yang Yifei as Feng Dongdong / Feng Rere
- Liu Guanxiang as Qiu Yue Bai
- Wei Zheming as Jiang Yiheng
- Yang Zhiying as Bai Lu
- Zhang Lei as Yue Tezhu
- Paul Chun as Qiu Guolin
- Lily Tien as Mother Tian
- Zhang Liwei as Father Tian
- Chen Luyuan as Xue Changan
- Sun Peng as Professor Li
- Liang Hao as Zhang Yuzai
- Dai Lifang as Xiao Wanzi
- Sheng Tangna as Hu Li
- Peng Naqi as Fang Xiao
- Chen Kexin as Ding Tian

== Soundtrack ==
My Amazing Boyfriend - Original Television Soundtrack (我的奇妙男友电视剧原声音乐大碟)
No.	Title	Music	Length
1.	"Not Afraid (不怕)" (Opening theme song)	Just
2.	"Waiting for You to Confess (等你开口)" (Ending theme song)	Cao Lu
3.	"My Love"	Just
4.	"Lying to Myself (骗自己)"	Janice Wu

== Awards and nominations ==
Year	Award	Category	Nominee	Result	Ref.
2016	1st Golden Guduo Media Awards	Most Popular Actress (Web series)	Janice Wu	Won	
