= Le Coup de Foudre =

- Promotional poster
- Genre: Romance
- Based on: I Don't Like This World, I Only Like You by Qiao Yi
- Written by: Ming Yuan; Yun Zi
- Directed by: Wang Zhi
- Starring: Janice Wu; Zhang Yujian; Zhao Zhiwei; Ma Li
- Country of origin: China
- Original language: Mandarin
- No. of episodes: 35

Production
- Production locations: Hangzhou, China; Serbia
- Running time: 45 minutes
- Production companies: Huace Media; Tencent Penguin Pictures; China South Angel

Original release
- Network: Tencent; Youku
- Release: April 29 – June 5, 2019

Le Coup de Foudre (Love at First Sight) (Chinese: 我只喜欢你; pinyin: Wo Zhi Xi Huan Ni) is a 2019 Chinese streaming television series based on the novel I Don't Like This World, I Only Like You (Chinese: 我不喜欢这世界，我只喜欢你; pinyin: Wo Bu Xi Huan Zhe Shi Jie, Wo Zhi Xi Huan Ni) by Qiao Yi. It aired on Tencent and Youku from April 29 to June 5, 2019.

The series accumulated 100 million views within 13 hours of its premiere. It was praised for its uplifting message of youth and heartwarming storyline.

== Synopsis ==
Zhao Qiaoyi and Yan Mo promised that they would study abroad together after graduation. However, a family incident caused Zhao Qiaoyi and Yan Mo to break their promise. Four years later, they meet again at high school reunion.

== Cast ==
=== Main ===
- Janice Wu as Zhao Qiaoyi
  - A kind-hearted and optimistic girl who suffered from low self-esteem when she was young. Her dream was to be a television program producer, but she quit her job to become a marketing assistant at Panda for Yan Mo.
- Zhang Yujian as Yan Mo
  - A quiet and reticent person who leads a strict regime and excels in his studies. He appears cold but cares for the people around him. He later becomes a product designer and launches a company called Panda with Dachuan.
- Zhao Zhiwei as Zhao Guanchao
  - Qiaoyi's twin brother. A doctor. A humorous and easygoing person who loved to date around. He doesn't believe in marriage until he falls in love with Wuyi.
- Ma Li as Hao Wuyi
  - Qiaoyi's best friend. A novel writer. A tomboy-ish girl who is forthright and easygoing. She is in love with Guanchao.

=== Supporting ===
==== Nanchuan secondary ====
- An Ge as Fei Dachuan
  - Yan Mo's "uncle". He appears tough and scary but is kind at heart, though brash at times. He falls in love with Youmei after realizing she is the girl who stood up for him in his childhood.
- Jampa Tseten as Teacher Gao
  - Former teacher of the class who cares deeply for his students.
- Zhang Keying as Yu Miaomiao
  - A haughty girl who is into fortune-telling.
- Jin Xinhe as Zhang Qihang
  - Chairperson of the class.
- Liu Xuan as Da Shi
  - An awkward guy who doesn't wash his hair, and likes to confess to his female classmates and recite poems.
- Yang Zhiying as Wang Yuran
  - The most beautiful girl in the school, who is misunderstood due to her beauty and cold personality.
- Zhao Ruyi as Shen Zhenqi
  - A guy who likes Wang Yuran, but turned nasty when she rejected him.
- Zhang Zhehao as Da Xiong
  - A third-year senior who plays with Wuyi's feelings. Wuyi's ex-boyfriend.
- Liu Renhou as Principal

==== Others ====
- Zhang Yue Ying as Cheng Youmei
  - A wealthy girl who is spoilt but kind at heart. Yan Mo's childhood friend who had a crush on him, but later falls for Dachuan.
- Yang Chao Ran as Tian Weimin
  - Qiaoyi and Guanchao's step-father. A policeman who later becomes disabled.
- Yan Qing Shu as Zhao Suying
  - Qiaoyi and Guanchao's mother.
- Guo Qiu Cheng as Yan Mo's father.
- Cao Yan Yan as Lin Shu
  - Yan Mo's mother. A ballerina.
- Xie Yutong as Ding Shengnan
  - Wuyi's mother.
- Zhao Ke Di as Zhou Zhao
  - Yan Mo's friend who likes Wuyi.
- Liang Chao as Wang Wei
  - Employee of Panda
- Fan Meng as Vivian
  - Employee of Panda
- Hu Wen as Zhang Taili
  - Employee of Panda
- Liu Yi Ning as Lili
  - Employee of Panda
- Yang Tian Qi as Cheng Ye
  - Cheng Youmei's brother and Panda's business rival
- Lu Yong as CEO Cheng
  - Cheng Youmei's and Cheng Ye's father
- Ye Xin Yu as Chief Fei
  - Police chief. Dachuan's father.
- Gu Hong as Zhao Lei
  - Qiaoyi and Guanchao's birth father.
- Ma Shu Liang as Lao Hu
  - Qiaoyi's superior.
- Li Chang as Yuan Shuai
  - Qiaoyi's colleague.
- Wang Genghao as Eric
  - Yan Mo's stepfather.
- Li Zhen Ping as Li Huanzhang
- Dong Mei as Weiwei
  - Qiaoyi's housemate

== Production ==
The drama began filming on March 29, 2018 at Hangzhou. It wrapped up filming on July 2, 2018 at Serbia.

== Reception ==
Le Coup De Foudre was met with positive reviews from critics. Hotpot.tv ranked the show #1 on their Top Nine Romantic Dramas of 2019 list.

== Soundtrack ==
| No. | Title | Lyrics | Music | Singers | Length |
|---|---|---|---|---|---|
| 1. | "The Heartbeat That Cannot Be Hidden (藏不住的心跳)" (Opening theme song) | Fan Fan | Youngju Hwang | Joyce Chu | 3:59 |
| 2. | "Never Let You Go" (Ending theme song) | Sa Ji | Youngju Hwang | Sa Ji | 3:39 |
| 3. | "The Beauty of Spring Has Arrived, But You're No Longer By My Side (春光如此却不得你)" | Sa Ji | Youngju Hwang | Sa Ji | 3:39 |
| 4. | "Slowly (冉冉)" | Wang Yajun | Youngju Hwang | Zhou Ziyan | 4:14 |
| 5. | "I Only Like You (我只喜欢你)" | Wang Yajun | Jin Dachuan | Hu Xia | 4:16 |
| 6. | "2000 Hz Distance (两万赫兹的距离)" | Jin Dachuan, Sa Ji | Jin Dachuan, Sa Ji | Jin Dachuan | 4:15 |
| 7. | "Dearest Friend (最相爱的朋友)" | Ma Li, Sun Yi | Jihoon Choi | Ma Li |
| 8. | "Standing By Your Side (站你这边)" | Fan Fan | SOE, PING | Li Jiajie, Zhang Rui |
| 9. | "Dearest You (亲爱的你)" | Zhou Jieying | Youngju Hwang | Fei Dingan |

== Awards and nominations ==
| Award | Category | Nominee | Results | Ref. |
|---|---|---|---|---|
| Golden Bud - The Fourth Network Film And Television Festival | Best Web Series | Le Coup de Foudre | Nominated | |
| Golden Bud - The Fourth Network Film And Television Festival | Best Actress | Janice Wu | Nominated | |

== International broadcast ==
| Country | Network | Title | Date |
|---|---|---|---|
| China | Youku | 我只喜欢你 | April 29, 2019 |
| China | Tencent | 我只喜欢你 | April 29, 2019 |
| Taiwan | Line TV | 我只喜欢你 | April 29, 2019 |
| Taiwan | iQIYI | 我只喜欢你 | April 29, 2019 |
| Brunei; Malaysia | dimsum | Le Coup de Foudre (Love at First Sight) | April 29, 2019 |
| Indonesia; Singapore | dimsum | Le Coup de Foudre (Love at First Sight) | October 29, 2019 |
| South Korea | Chunghwa TV | Le Coup de Foudre 너만 좋아해: 아지희환니 | June 10, 2019 |
