= International Society for Structural and Multidisciplinary Optimization =

The International Society for Structural and Multidisciplinary Optimization is a learned society in the field of multidisciplinary design optimization that was founded in October 1991. It has more than 1000 members in 45 countries. The current president is Wei Chen (Northwestern University). The society is an affiliated organization of the International Union of Theoretical and Applied Mechanics (IUTAM).

== Objectives ==
The objectives are:

- to stimulate and promote research into all aspects of the optimal design of structures and related topics, including engineering systems consisting partially of structures and/or fluids;
- to encourage practical applications of optimization methods and the corresponding software development in all branches of technology;
- to foster the interchange of ideas amongst various fields contributing to structural and multidisciplinary optimization;
- to support the role of optimization in multidisciplinary design;
- to provide a framework for the organization of meetings and other means for the dissemination of knowledge on structural optimization; and
- to promote teaching of structural optimization in tertiary institutions.

The society works towards these objectives by organizing a biennial "World Congress of Structural and Multidisciplinary Optimization" and publishing an official journal, Structural and Multidisciplinary Optimization, in collaboration with Springer Science+Business Media.

== Past Presidents ==
- 1991-1995: George Rozvany (Founder President)
- 1995-1999: Raphael Haftka
- 1999-2003: Niels Olhoff
- 2003-2007: Martin P. Bendsøe
- 2007-2011: KK Choi
- 2011-2015: Ole Sigmund
- 2015-2019: Cheng Gengdong
