= Janice Wu =

Chinese actress (born 1992)

- 吴倩
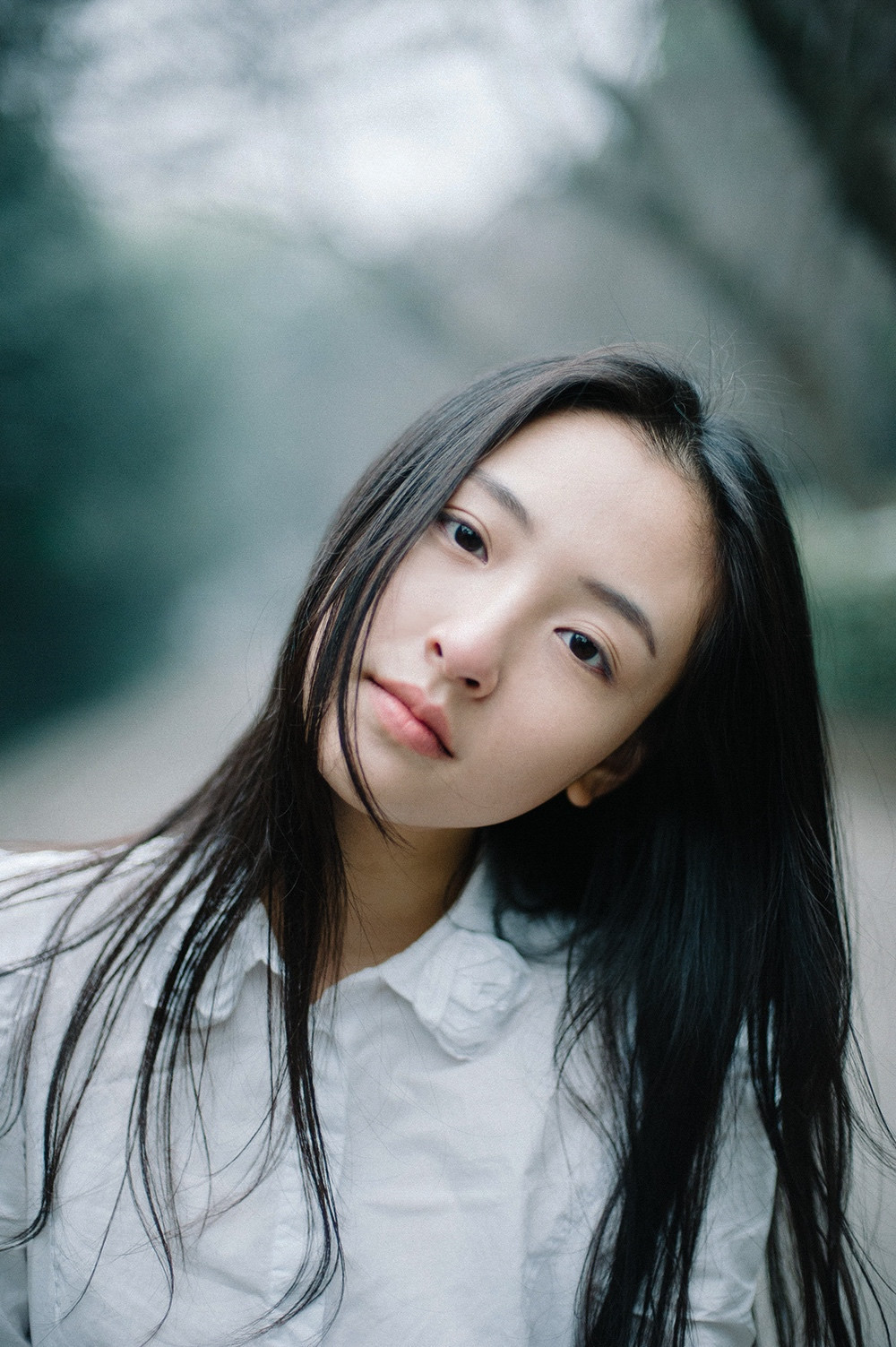
- Wu in 2015
- Born: September 26, 1992 (age 34); Ezhou, Hubei, China
- Other name: Wu Qian
- Education: Wuhan University
- Occupation: Actress
- Years active: 2014–present
- Agent(s): Huace Film & TV , Mountain Top (Taiyang Chuanhe) (since 2026)
- Spouse: Zhang Yujian (m. 2020; div. 2022)
- Children: 1

Wu Qian (Chinese: 吴倩; pinyin: Wú Qiàn, born September 26, 1992), also known as Janice Wu, is a Chinese actress. She rose to fame for portraying the younger counterpart of Zhao Mosheng in the 2015 hit romance drama My Sunshine, and gained attention for her roles in the television series My Amazing Boyfriend (2016), Fighter of the Destiny (2017), The Brightest Star in the Sky (2019), Le Coup de Foudre (2019), and Skate into Love (2020).

== Career ==
Wu made her acting debut in 2014 with a minor role in Heroes of Sui and Tang Dynasties 3 & 4. She became known for her role in the wuxia drama The Deer and the Cauldron, playing Mu Jianping.

In 2015, Wu starred as the younger counterpart of Zhao Mosheng in the hit romance drama My Sunshine, gaining popularity for her portrayal. The following year, she played her first lead role in the romance comedy series My Amazing Boyfriend (2016). The series was a success and gained more than 2 billion views by the end of its run.

In 2017, Wu starred in the hit fantasy drama Fighter of the Destiny. The role of Luo Luo endeared her to the audience and contributed to her rise in popularity. The same year, Wu reunited with My Sunshine co-star Luo Yunxi in the fantasy romance drama A Life Time Love.

In 2018, Wu had a guest role in the palace drama Ruyi's Royal Love in the Palace, where she played an antagonistic character for the first time. The same year, she starred in the fantasy action drama Oriental Odyssey alongside Zheng Yecheng.

In 2019, Wu starred alongside Huang Zitao in the music romance drama The Brightest Star in the Sky. The same year, she starred in the romance web series Le Coup de Foudre.

In 2020, Wu starred in the sports romance drama Skate into Love alongside Zhang Xincheng.

== Personal life ==
In 2021, it was confirmed that she and her Le Coup de Foudre co-star Zhang Yujian are married and have a daughter together. They divorced in 2022.

== Filmography ==
=== Film ===
| Year | English title | Chinese title | Role | Notes | Ref. |
|---|---|---|---|---|---|
| 2012 | Shi Bu Di Tou | 誓不低头 | Zhang Yingzi | | |
| 2013 | Xian Hua Lin | 昙华林 | Fang Xiaolin | | |
| 2014 | He Que Hua Kai | 禾雀花开 | Li Qian | | |
| 2016 | Love O2O | 微微一笑很倾城 | Xiao Ling | | |
| 2021 | Catman | 我爱喵星人 | Miao Xiaowan | shot in 2016 | |
| 2022 | Lighting Up the Stars | 人生大事 | Xi Xi | | |
| 2022 | Warriors of Future | 明日戰記 | Xiao Lü | shot in 2017 | |
| 2024 | Like A Rolling Stone | 出走的决心 | Sun Xiaoxue | | |

=== Television series ===
| Year | English title | Chinese title | Role | Notes | Ref. |
|---|---|---|---|---|---|
| 2014 | Heroes of Sui and Tang Dynasties | 隋唐英雄4 | Zhu Qianqian | | |
| 2014 | Fire Fighter | 火线英雄 | Mi Yuanyuan | | |
| 2014 | Young Sherlock | 少年神探狄仁杰 | Tong Mengxi | | |
| 2014 | The Deer and the Cauldron | 鹿鼎记 | Mu Jianping | | |
| 2015 | My Sunshine | 何以笙箫默 | young Zhao Mosheng | | |
| 2015 | The Orange Code | 橙色密码 | He Ruyin | Cameo | |
| 2015 | A Scholar Dream of Woman | 碧血书香梦 | Xuan Minyue | | |
| 2015 | Cherish Love | 且行且珍惜 | Zhao Wenli | | |
| 2016 | My Amazing Boyfriend | 我的奇妙男友 | Tian Jingzhi | | |
| 2016 | The Fox Fairy Court | 大仙衙门 | Xiao Cui | | |
| 2017 | Fighter of the Destiny | 择天记 | Bai Luoheng (Luo Luo) | | |
| 2017 | A Life Time Love | 上古情歌 | Yi Li | | |
| 2018 | Ruyi's Royal Love in the Palace | 如懿传 | Tian Yunjiao | Cameo | |
| 2018 | An Oriental Odyssey | 盛唐幻夜 | Ye Yuanan | | |
| 2019 | The Brightest Star in the Sky | 夜空中最闪亮的星 | Yang Zhenzhen | | |
| 2019 | Le Coup de Foudre | 我只喜欢你 | Zhao Qiaoyi | | |
| 2020 | Skate into Love | 冰糖炖雪梨 | Tang Xue | | |
| 2020 | Black Lighthouse | 黑色灯塔 | Qiao Nuo / Qiao Ya | | |
| 2021 | Beauty From Heart | 这个世界不看脸 | Tao Xiaoting | shot from 2016 to 2017 | |
| 2021 | Octogenarians and the 90s | 八零九零 | Ye Xiaomei | | |
| 2021 | Faith Makes Great | 理想照耀中国 | Song Xi | "Girl Soldiers Sortie" (Ep. 38) | |
| 2021 | New Generation | 我们的新时代 | Liu Shilan | "Happiness Method" (Ep. 25–32) | |
| 2021 | You Are My Glory | 你是我的荣耀 | Chen Xue | Cameo (Ep. 24–25, 29) | |
| 2022 | Discovery of Romance | 恋爱的夏天 | Xia Tian | | |
| 2022 | Light Chaser Rescue | 追光者 | Zhan Yan | | |
| 2023 | Meet Yourself | 去有风的地方 | Chen Nanxing | Cameo | |
| 2023 | Here We Meet Again | 三分野 | Xiang Yuan | | |
| 2023 | Faithful | 九义人 | Meng Wan | | |
| 2024 | Braveness of the Ming | 锦衣夜行 | Tang Saier | shot in 2015, aired in South Korea in 2024 | |
| 2025 | Liu Zi Mei | 六姊妹 | He Jiahuan | | |
| TBA | Sui Shi Ji | 岁食记 | Li Caicai | shot in 2019 | |

=== Variety shows ===
| Year | English title | Chinese title | Role | Ref. |
|---|---|---|---|---|
| 2015 | Day Day Up | 天天向上 | EP. 20150410 Guest | |
| 2015 | Survivor Games | 跟着贝尔去冒险 | Regular Member | |
| 2016 | Happy Camp | 快乐大本营 | EP. 20161008 Guest | |
| 2016 | Super Premiere | 超级大首映 | EP. 4 Guest | |
| 2019 | Sweet Tasks | 甜蜜的任务 | EP. 31 Guest | |
| 2023 | Ride the Wind 2023 | 乘风2023 | Ep. 1-7 Contestant | |

=== Music video appearances ===
| Year | Song title | | Artist | Ref. |
|---|---|---|---|---|
| 2015 | "Promises" | 诺言 | Lu Han | |
| 2015 | "Tian Jin Jue" | 天禁诀 | Guang Liang | |
| 2017 | "The Chaos After You" | 如果雨之後 | Eric Chou | |

== Discography ==
=== Soundtrack appearances ===
| Year | English title | Chinese title | Album | Ref. |
|---|---|---|---|---|
| 2016 | "Lying to Myself" | 骗自己 | My Amazing Boyfriend OST | |
| 2018 | "Twilight Cold Snow" | 暮雪凉 | An Oriental Odyssey OST | |

== Awards and nominations ==
| Year | Award | Category | Nominated work | Result | Ref. |
|---|---|---|---|---|---|
| 2016 | 2015 China TV Drama Awards | Audience's Favourite Newcomer Actress | My Sunshine | Nominated | |
| 2016 | 1st Golden Blossom Internet Film and Television Awards | Most Popular Actress (Web series) | My Amazing Boyfriend | Won | |
| 2016 | 2016 Tencent Video Star Awards | Influential Young Female Artist of the Year | —N/a | Won | |
| 2016 | 3rd The Actors of China Awards | Outstanding Actress | —N/a | Won | |
| 2017 | 11th Tencent Video Star Awards | Breakthrough Actress | —N/a | Won | |
| 2018 | Fashion Power Awards | Most Promising Female Artist | —N/a | Won | |
| 2019 | 4th Golden Blossom Internet Film and Television Awards | Best Actress | The Brightest Star in the Sky, Le Coup de Foudre | Nominated | |
| 2020 | 7th The Actors of China Awards | Excellent Actress (Emerald Award/Green Group) | —N/a | Won | |
| 2021 | 2020 China TV Drama Awards | Notable Actress of the Year | Skate into Love | Won | |
| 2021 | Fusion Screen Communication Ceremony | Energentic Actress | —N/a | Won | |
| 2024 | 2024 iQIYI Scream Night | Best Supporting Actress of the Year (Film unit) | Like A Rolling Stone | Won | |
