= Godsend (2014 film) =

2014 South Korean drama film

- Release poster
- Directed by: Moon Si-hyun
- Written by: Kim Ki-duk
- Starring: Lee Eun-woo; Jeon Soo-jin; Lee Seung-joon; Kim Tae-hwan
- Production company: Kim Ki-Duk Film
- Release date: April 10, 2014
- Running time: 107 minutes
- Country: South Korea
- Language: Korean

Godsend (Korean: 신의 선물) is a 2014 South Korean drama film directed by Moon Si-hyun and written by Kim Ki-duk.

== Premise ==
Seung-yeon wanted to have a baby, but So-yeong wanted to have an abortion, so she was asked to give birth and give the baby to Seung-yeon. The two women then go to a house in the countryside and live together waiting for So-yeong to give birth, but they face an unforeseen danger.

== Cast ==
- Lee Eun-woo as Seung-yeon
- Jeon Soo-jin as So-yeong
- Lee Seung-joon as Seung-yeon's husband
- Kim Tae-hwan as Hunter
