= Skate into Love =

Chinese TV series

- Official poster
- Chinese: 冰糖炖雪梨
- Hanyu Pinyin: Bīngtáng Dùn Xuělí
- Genre: Romance comedy Sports
- Based on: Bin Tang Dun Xue Li by Jiu Xiaoqi
- Written by: Ma Jia
- Directed by: Zhu Ruibin
- Starring: Janice Wu; Zhang Xincheng
- Country of origin: China
- Original language: Mandarin
- No. of seasons: 1
- No. of episodes: 40

Production
- Executive producer: Liu Ning
- Production location: Qingdao
- Running time: 45 mins
- Production companies: Perfect World Pictures; Omnijoi Media; Youku; Kunchi Pictures; Haolan Xingpan

Original release
- Network: Jiangsu TV; Zhejiang TV
- Release: March 19, 2020

Skate into Love (Chinese: 冰糖炖雪梨; pinyin: Bīngtáng Dùn Xuělí) is a 2020 Chinese television series based on the novel of the same name by Jiu Xiaoqi. It stars Janice Wu and Zhang Xincheng. The series premiered on Jiangsu TV and Zhejiang TV on March 19, 2020.

== Synopsis ==
A story about two childhood classmates, Li Yu Bing (Steven Zhang) and Tang Xue (Wu Qian), who share the same love for ice-skating. Li Yu Bing saw Tang Xue as a bully in elementary school, and later they are separated for some years. But their ice-skating careers take different paths. Li Yu Bing becomes a famous hockey player at his university, while Tang Xue gave up speed skating after an injury. When the two coincidentally meet again when they go to the same university, Li Yu Bing takes the opportunity to seek revenge. Though, bit by bit, he sees that Tang Xue is not all bad as he thought, so he helps her fall back into love with the sport she gave up on. They eventually fall in love and face many obstacles on and off the ice together.

== Cast ==
- Janice Wu as Tang Xue
  - Zhangshang Mingzhu as Young Tang Xue
- Zhang Xincheng as Li Yubing
  - Li Chaoping as Young Li Yubing
- Zhou Lijie as Yu Yan
- Chu Yue as Zhou Ran
- Cao Bo as Jiang Shijia
- He Xuanlin as Xia Menghuan
- Wei Tianhao as Bian Cheng
- Han Jiunuo as Zhang Yuewei
- Qin Tianyu as Liao Zhenyu
- Lu Junyao as Ye Liuying
- Xia Minghao as Coach Jin
- Li Zongrui

=== Special appearance ===
- Deng Lun as Xu Feng, "Ice God" (Ep 1, 36, 40)
- Wu Dajing as Himself (Ep 1, 40)

== Production ==
The drama is produced by the team behind Ashes of Love. It is part two of "The Honey Trilogy" alongside Ashes of Love and Love When The Stars Fall.

On April 17, 2019, a filming ceremony was held at Qingdao to officially announce the start of principal photography. A 30 x 60 meters ice skating rink was built for the filming. Professional short track speed skaters were hired to serve as instructors for the cast members, and they also play supporting roles in the drama. Filming wrapped up on July 29, 2019.

== Reception ==
The television series scored a 9.5 out of 10 on popular streaming site Viki. The drama was praised for its realistic skating scenes, light-hearted and humorous plot, and the chemistry between the main actors.

== Soundtrack ==
No.	Title	Lyrics	Music	Singers	Length
1.	"A Ray of Hope (曙光)" (Opening theme song)	Wang Xia, EO Yi Huan	Wang Xia	Zhang Xincheng	3:49
2.	"The Moment I Met You (当遇见你)" (Ending theme song)	Chen Huan	Sa Dingding	Liu Yuning	3:11
3.	"Land of Ice and Snow (冰天雪地)"	Yu Hong	Sa Dingding	He Xuanlin	4:02
4.	"Snowflakes Falling (雪花落下)"	Chen Huan	Sa Dingding	Zhou Shen	3:49
5.	"The Moment I Met You (当遇见你)"	Chen Huan	Sa Dingding	Sa Dingding	3:11
6.	"Tempting Heart (心动)"	EO Yi Huan	Wang Xia	Zhang Xincheng	3:58

== Ratings ==
- Highest ratings are marked in red, lowest ratings are marked in blue

Broadcast date	Zhejiang TV CSM59 ratings			Jiangsu TV CSM59 ratings		
Broadcast date	Ratings (%)	Audience share (%)	Rank	Ratings (%)	Audience share (%)	Rank
2020.3.19	1.819	5.46	3	1.566	4.71	5
2020.3.20	1.981	5.96	6	2.256	6.8	4
2020.3.21	2.133	6.51	3	2.231	6.76	1
2020.3.22	2.253	6.74	2	2.282	6.84	1
2020.3.23	2.054	6.38	3	2.234	6.95	2
2020.3.24	2.144	6.7	3	2.182	6.84	2
2020.3.25	2.115	6.53	4	2.164	6.69	3
2020.3.26	2.193	6.65	3	2.249	6.83	2
2020.3.27	2.228	6.92	1	2.038	6.2	4
2020.3.28	2.108	6.44	4	2.227	6.79	1
2020.3.29	2.258	6.84	2	2.208	6.7	4
2020.3.30	2.177	6.68	4	2.225	6.84	2
2020.3.31	2.217	6.74	4	1.793	5.46	5
2020.4.1	2.244	6.95	4	2.269	7.07	3
2020.4.2	2.283	7.15	2	2.133	6.7	5
2020.4.3	2.12	6.63	3	2.066	6.49	4
2020.4.5	2.176	7.02	2	1.782	5.71	4
2020.4.6	2.101	6.61	5	2.229	7.02	1
2020.4.7	2.043	6.51	5	2.396	7.64	1
2020.4.8	2.044	6.47	5	2.347	7.44	1
2020.4.9	2.158	6.8	4	2.426	7.64	2
