= Young Blood (TV series) =

- Genre: Historical; Action; Mystery
- Written by: Wang Juan
- Directed by: Yi Zheng
- Starring: Zhang Xincheng; Zhou Yutong; Wang Youshuo; Zheng Wei; Bruce Hung; Su Xiaotong
- Country of origin: China
- Original language: Mandarin
- No. of episodes: 42

Production
- Producers: Wang Shuo; Zhou En
- Production location: Hengdian
- Production companies: Mango Entertainment iQiyi; SEG 华联映画

Original release
- Network: Hunan TV
- Release: June 3 – July 17, 2019

Young Blood (Chinese: 大宋少年志; pinyin: Da Song Shao Nian Zhi) is a 2019 Chinese television series directed by Yi Zheng and Wang Juan, that aired on Hunan TV from 3 June 2019 to 17 July 2019 for 42 episodes. The series wrapped up filming in July 2018.

== Plot ==
Six youths of different backgrounds come together to form a team of top elite spies of the Northern Song dynasty.

== Cast ==
- Zhang Xincheng as Yuan Zhongxin
- Zhou Yutong as Zhao Jian
- Wang Youshuo as Wang Kuan
- Zheng Wei as Xue Ying
- Su Xiaotong as Pei Jing
- Bruce Hung as Wei Yanei
- Tong Fan as Lu Guannian
- Gao Ziqi as Yuan Boqi
- Marco Lo as Han Duanzhang
- Yan Xiao as Ding Er
- Liu Meihan as Yun Ni
- Li Xiaochuan as Lao Zei
- Sui Yongliang as Liang Zhu
- Wang Zheng as Qin Wuya

== Soundtrack ==
No.	Title	Singer(s)	Length
1.	"少年志"	Vogue 5
2.	"借一束光"	圈9
3.	"梦想的模样"	Zhang Xincheng
4.	"献世"	Zhang Yangyang

== Reception ==
The drama received positive reviews for transmitting positive values of loving your country and chasing your dreams. It received praise for its unexpected plot twists and interesting characters. It received a score of 8.2 on Douban.

== Award and nominations ==
Award	Category	Nominee	Result	ref.
30th China TV Golden Eagle Award	Outstanding Television Series	All Is Well	Pending	
