= Chen Wei (politician) =

Chinese politician

- 陈伟

Communist Party Secretary of Zaozhuang
- In office December 2011 – February 2015
- Preceded by: Liu Yuxiang (刘玉祥)
- Succeeded by: Li Tongdao (李同道)

Mayor of Zaozhuang
- In office September 2006 – December 2011
- Preceded by: Liu Yuxiang
- Succeeded by: Zhang Shuping (张术平)

Secretary of Shandong Provincial Committee of the Communist Youth League
- In office September 2002 – September 2006
- Preceded by: Liu Huiyan (刘慧晏)
- Succeeded by: Zhang Guangfeng (张光峰)

Personal details
- Born: October 1966 (age 59) Jinhua, Zhejiang, China
- Party: Chinese Communist Party (1987–2015; expelled)
- Education: PLA Information Engineering University; Harbin Engineering University; East China University of Science and Technology; Tokyo Institute of Technology

Chen Wei (simplified Chinese: 陈伟; traditional Chinese: 陳偉; pinyin: Chén Weǐ; born October 1966) is a former Chinese politician who spent most of his career in East China's Shandong province. As of February 2015 he was under investigation by the Central Commission for Discipline Inspection of the Chinese Communist Party (CCP). Previously he served as the CCP Committee Secretary of Zaozhuang. He is now the executive director of China Jingyi Group and chairman of Zhejiang Huajingtong Tourism Development Co., Ltd.

Chinese media reported that Chen Wei had close relations with Gu Liping, wife of Ling Jihua, former vice chairman of the National Chinese People's Political Consultative Conference (CPPCC) and the head of the United Front Work Department of the Communist Party Central Committee.

== Life and career ==
Chen Wei was born and raised in Jinhua, Zhejiang. He entered PLA Information Engineering University in September 1984, majoring in information system at the College of Electronic Technology, where he graduated in July 1988. Then he was a postgraduate student at Harbin Engineering University from August 1988 to August 1990, and from September 1990-September 1993 doctoral student at East China University of Science and Technology. He then went to Japan for four years to study economic management. He remained in Japan, becoming a chief engineer at Omron Corporation in April 1997.

Chen returned to China in 2000, he was the assistant mayor in Weihai in December 2000, and vice-mayor, in January 2002.

In September 2002, he was appointed secretary and party branch secretary of Shandong Provincial Committee of the Communist Youth League, he remained in that position until September 2006, when he was transferred to Zaozhuang and appointed CCP Deputy Committee Secretary and mayor. He was CCP Committee Secretary, the top political position in the city, from December 2011 to February 2015.

== Downfall ==
On February 28, 2015, the state media reported that he was placed under investigation by the Central Commission for Discipline Inspection. Then he was dismissed for corruption. On July 8, he was expelled from the CCP and was downgraded to section director level of non-leadership position (科级非领导职务).

Party political offices
Preceded by Liu Yuxiang	Communist Party Secretary of Zaozhuang; 2011–2015	Succeeded by Li Tongdao
Government offices
Preceded by Liu Yuxiang	Mayor of Zaozhuang; 2006–2011	Succeeded by Zhang Shuping
Civic offices
Preceded by Liu Huiyan	Secretary of Shandong Provincial Committee of the Communist Youth League; 2002–2006	Succeeded by Zhang Guangfeng
