= Bright Future (TV series) =

- Promotional poster
- Traditional Chinese: 縣委大院
- Simplified Chinese: 县委大院
- Hanyu Pinyin: Xiànwěi Dàyuàn
- Genre: Political drama
- Written by: Wang Xiaoqiang
- Directed by: Kong Sheng; Mao Junlin; Wang Hong
- Starring: Hu Ge; Wu Yue; Zhang Xincheng; Huang Lei; Li Guangjie
- Country of origin: China
- Original language: Mandarin
- No. of seasons: 1
- No. of episodes: 24

Production
- Executive producer: Hou Hongliang
- Production company: Daylight Entertainment

Original release
- Network: CCTV-1
- Release: December 7, 2022

Bright Future (Chinese: 县委大院) is a 2022 Chinese political drama television series directed by Kong Sheng, Mao Junlin and Wang Hong, and starring Hu Ge, Wu Yue, Zhang Xincheng, Huang Lei, and Li Guangjie. The series tells the story of Mei Xiaoge, the county committee secretary, and his colleagues who unite the people to build Guangming County. The television series started airing on CCTV-1 on 7 December 2022.

== Cast ==
=== Main ===
- Hu Ge as Mei Xiaoge, deputy party secretary and magistrate and future party secretary of Guangming County (光明县).
  - Liu Haoran as young Mei Xiaoge.
- Wu Yue as Ai Xianzhi, deputy party secretary of Guangming County.
- Zhang Xincheng as section member of the Office of Guangming County People's Government.
- Huang Lei as party secretary of Guangming County.
- Li Guangjie as deputy party secretary and magistrate of Jiuyuan County (九原县).

=== Supporting ===
- Liu Tao as Li Tang, head of the Publicity Department of the CCP Guangming County Committee.
- Bao Bei'er as Xiao Zeng or Little Zeng
- Wang Xiao as Qiao Shengli
- Ren Chengwei as San Bao
- You Zhiyong as Lao Qiu or Old Qiu
- Ning Wentong, party secretary of Luquan Township (鹿泉乡).
- Fang Zibin as Li Baoping
- Sun Chun as Zhou Liangshun, former deputy party secretary of Guangming County.
- Zhu Yuchen as Zheng San, chairman of East Asia Star Energy Group.
- Wan Qian as Qiao Mai, an official from Xinchuan City (新川市).
- Xue Haojing as Jiang Xia, section member of the Office of Guangming County People's Government.
- Huang Jue as Jiang Xinmin
- Huang Yao as He Yaping
- Wang Yanhui as Ma Guangqun
- Liu Jun as Li Guochun
- Wang Yongquan as Lao Guai or Old Guai
- Mao Hai as Bao Gen
- Dong Yong as Director Guo
- Ren Zhong as Duan Yingjiu
- Wei Qing as mother of Bao Gen
- Ru Ping as mother of Xiao Lin
- Liu Yiwei as calligrapher
- Guo Guangping as Gu Wenzhang
- Yan Xiaopin as Liu Qiaozhen
- Xu Jia as Liu Yajun
- Huang Chengcheng as Yuan Hao
- Tian Xiaojie as Leader Sun
- Jia Jinghui as Li Donglin

== Production ==
The television series was shot on locations in Hefei and Huainan between May 16 and July 28, 2022.
