= Structural and Multidisciplinary Optimization =

- Discipline: Engineering
- Language: English
- Edited by: G. Cheng, M. Zhou

Publication details
- History: 1989-present
- Publisher: Springer Science+Business Media
- Frequency: Bimonthly
- Impact factor: 4.542 (2020)

Standard abbreviations
- ISO 4: Struct. Multidiscip. Optim.

Indexing
- CODEN: SOPTEQ
- ISSN: 1615-147X (print); 1615-1488 (web)
- LCCN: 91643999
- OCLC no.: 44437432

Links
- Journal homepage

Structural and Multidisciplinary Optimization is a peer-reviewed scientific journal published by Springer Science+Business Media. It is the official journal of the International Society of Structural and Multidisciplinary Optimization. It covers all aspects of designing optimal structures in stressed systems as well as multidisciplinary optimization techniques when one of the disciplines deals with structures (stressed solids) or fluids. The journal's scope ranges from the mathematical foundations of the field to algorithm and software development with benchmark studies to practical applications and case studies in structural, aero-space, mechanical, civil, chemical, and naval engineering. Closely related fields such as computer-aided design and manufacturing, reliability analysis, artificial intelligence, system identification and modeling, inverse processes, computer simulation, and active control of structures are covered when the topic is relevant to optimization. The current editor-in-chief since 2015 is Raphael T. Haftka (University of Florida) since the passage of the founding editor George I. N. Rozvany (Budapest University of Technology and Economics).

== Abstracting and indexing ==
The journal is abstracted and indexed in: Academic OneFile, Academic Search, Compendex, Current Contents/Engineering, Mathematical Reviews, Science Citation Index Expanded, and Scopus. According to the Journal Citation Reports, the journal has a 2020 impact factor of 4.542.
