= Zhang Yujian =

Chinese actor

- Born: February 9, 1990 (age 36); Binzhou, Shandong, China
- Education: Shanghai Theater Academy
- Occupation: Actor
- Years active: 2011–present
- Agent(s): Huace Film & TV
- Spouse: Janice Wu (m. 2020; div. 2022)
- Children: 1

Zhang Yujian (Chinese: 张雨剑, born February 9, 1990) is a Chinese actor.

== Biography ==
Zhang first appeared in Mayday's musical film May Day Chase Dream 3DNA in 2011 and was remembered for his role as a delivery boy.

Zhang first gained recognition with his role as Wang Kai's subordinate in the historical drama Nirvana in Fire. He then gained increased recognition with his performances in the fantasy drama Ice Fantasy and crime drama Yu Zui in 2016.

In 2018, Zhang starred in the fantasy action drama An Oriental Odyssey. He received positive reviews for his role as a detective.

In 2019, Zhang starred as the male lead in the romance web series Le Coup de Foudre, reuniting with An Oriental Odyssey co-star Janice Wu. The same year, he starred in the romance comedy drama Please Love Me as a top singer.

== Personal life ==
In 2021, it was confirmed that Zhang and his Le Coup de Foudre co-star, Janice Wu are married and have a child together. They divorced in 2022.

== Filmography ==
=== Film ===
Year	English title	Chinese title	Role	Notes
2011	May Day Chase Dream 3DNA	五月天追梦3DNA	Yu Jian	
2012	Ren Lai Ren Wang	人来人往	Qin Shen	Short film

=== Television series ===
Year	English title	Chinese title	Role	Notes/Ref.
2013	Bloodbath Island	喋血孤岛		
2015	Nirvana in Fire	琅琊榜	Lie Zhanying	
2015	The Legend of Mi Yue	芈月传	Tang Le	
2016	The Boss is Coming	老板来了	Ricky	
2016	Yu Zui	余罪	Jie Bing	
2016	Angel Wings	隐形的翅膀	Gao Fei	
2016	Ice Fantasy	幻城	Pian Feng	
2016	I'm Not A Monster	我不是妖怪	He Anyi	
2017	Delicious Destiny	美味奇缘	Zhao Han	
2018	An Oriental Odyssey	盛唐幻夜	Zhao Lanzhi	
2019	The Plough Department of Song Dynasty	大宋北斗司	Liu Suifeng	
2019	Le Coup de Foudre	我只喜欢你	Yan Mo	
2019	Please Love Me	拜托请你爱我	Yi Han	
2020	Find Yourself	下一站是幸福	He Canyang	
2020	The Night of the Comet 2	彗星来的那一夜2之蓝洞之恋	Lin Senhe	
2020	Target Person	目标人物	Wei Zi You	
2021	Fall in love with a scientist	当爱情遇上科学家	Doctor Li	Guest Role
2021	Hot Blooded Detective	热血神探	Kong Xueli	
2021	Silent Evidence	法医秦明之无声的证词	Qin Ming	

=== Television show ===
Year	English title	Chinese title	Role	Notes/Ref.
2020	Wang Miao Wu Yu	汪喵物语	Cast member	

== Awards and nominations ==
Year	Award	Category	Nominated work	Result	Ref.
2020	7th The Actors of China Award Ceremony	Best Actor (Web series)	—N/a	Nominated	
