= Chen Wei (footballer, born 1993) =

Chinese footballer (born 1993)

Chen Wei 陈伟
Personal information
- Full name: Chen Wei
- Date of birth: 19 February 1993 (age 33)
- Place of birth: Anhui, China
- Height: 1.72 m (5 ft 8 in)
- Positions: Midfielder; defender

Team information
- Current team: Suzhou Dongwu
- Number: 6

Youth career
- Jiangsu Youth

Senior career*
Years	Team	Apps	(Gls)
2011–2012	Jiangsu Youth	30	(0)
2014–2018	Shanghai Shenxin	12	(0)
2019–	Suzhou Dongwu	17	(0)
- * Club domestic league appearances and goals as of 31 December 2019

Chen Wei (Chinese: 陈伟; born 19 February 1993 in Anhui) is a Chinese footballer who currently plays for Suzhou Dongwu in the China League One.

== Club career ==
Chen Wei started his professional football career in 2011 when he joined Jiangsu Youth for the 2011 China League Two campaign. Failing to join Jiangsu Sainty, he moved to another Chinese Super League club Shanghai Shenxin in January 2014. On 18 April 2015, he made his Super League debut in a 4–1 home defeat against Changchun Yatai, coming on as a substitute for Zhang Wentao in the 67th minute. He was sent to the reserved team in 2018.

On 11 January 2019, Chen transferred to League Two side Suzhou Dongwu.

== Career statistics ==
Statistics accurate as of match played 31 December 2019.

Appearances and goals by club, season and competition
Club	Season	League			National Cup		Continental		Other		Total	
Club	Season	Division	Apps	Goals	Apps	Goals	Apps	Goals	Apps	Goals	Apps	Goals
Jiangsu Youth	2011	China League Two	10	0	-		-		-		10	0
Jiangsu Youth	2012	China League Two	20	0	-		-		-		20	0
Jiangsu Youth	Total		30	0	0	0	0	0	0	0	30	0
Shanghai Shenxin	2014	Chinese Super League	0	0	1	0	-		-		1	0
Shanghai Shenxin	2015	Chinese Super League	9	0	0	0	-		-		9	0
Shanghai Shenxin	2016	China League One	3	0	1	0	-		-		4	0
Shanghai Shenxin	2017	China League One	0	0	0	0	-		-		0	0
Shanghai Shenxin	Total		12	0	2	0	0	0	0	0	14	0
Suzhou Dongwu	2019	China League Two	17	0	1	0	-		-		18	0
Career total			59	0	3	0	0	0	0	0	62	0
