= Wei Chen (engineer) =

Chinese-American mechanical engineer

Wei Chen is a Chinese-American mechanical engineer known for her work on robust engineering design, robust design of experiments, metamodeling in design, uncertainty quantification, and design under uncertainty. She is the Wilson-Cook Professor in Engineering Design at Northwestern University, where she chairs the mechanical engineering department.

== Education and career ==
Chen earned a bachelor's degree in mechanical engineering from Shanghai Jiao Tong University, a master's degree from the University of Houston, and a Ph.D. from the Georgia Institute of Technology, completed in 1995. She joined the Northwestern University faculty in 2003.

She is the editor-in-chief of the ASME Journal of Mechanical Design and president of the International Society for Structural and Multidisciplinary Optimization. She became chair of mechanical engineering at Northwestern in 2020.

== Book ==
Chen is the coauthor with Christopher Hoyle and Henk Jan Wassenaar of the book Decision-based Design: Integrating Consumer Preferences into Engineering Design (Springer, 2012). She is also a co-editor of several edited volumes.

== Recognition ==
Chen was the 2006 winner of the Ralph R. Teetor Educational Award of SAE International. She was named a Fellow of the American Society of Mechanical Engineers in 2009, was elected to the National Academy of Engineering in 2019 "for contributions to design under uncertainty in products and systems, and leadership in the engineering design community", was awarded the 2021 Charles Russ Richards Memorial Award by the American Society of Mechanical Engineers and Pi Tau Sigma National Mechanical Engineering Honor Society, and won the Engineering Science Medal from the Society of Engineering Science in 2022.
