= Kim Tae-hwan (actor) =

South Korean actor and model (born 1992)

- Born: July 12, 1992 (age 34); Gwangsan District, Gwangju, South Korea
- Occupations: Actor; model
- Years active: 2014–present

Korean name
- Hangul: 김태환
- RR: Gim Taehwan
- MR: Kim T'aehwan

Kim Tae-hwan (Korean: 김태환; born July 12, 1992) is a South Korean actor and model. He is best known for his starring role as Xue Lingqiao on Tencent's web series My Amazing Boyfriend (2016).

== Filmography ==
=== Film ===
Year	Title	Role	Notes
2014	Godsend	Hunter	

=== Television drama ===
Year	Title	Role	Notes
2016	My Amazing Boyfriend	Xue Lingqiao	
2017	The Bride of Habaek	Jin Kun	

=== Web series ===
Year	Title	Role	Notes
2022	Love Class	Lee Ro-ah	

=== Television shows ===
Year	Title	Role	Notes/Ref.
2025	Single's Inferno 4	Himself	
