= Gong Jun =

Chinese actor (born 1992)

- 龚俊
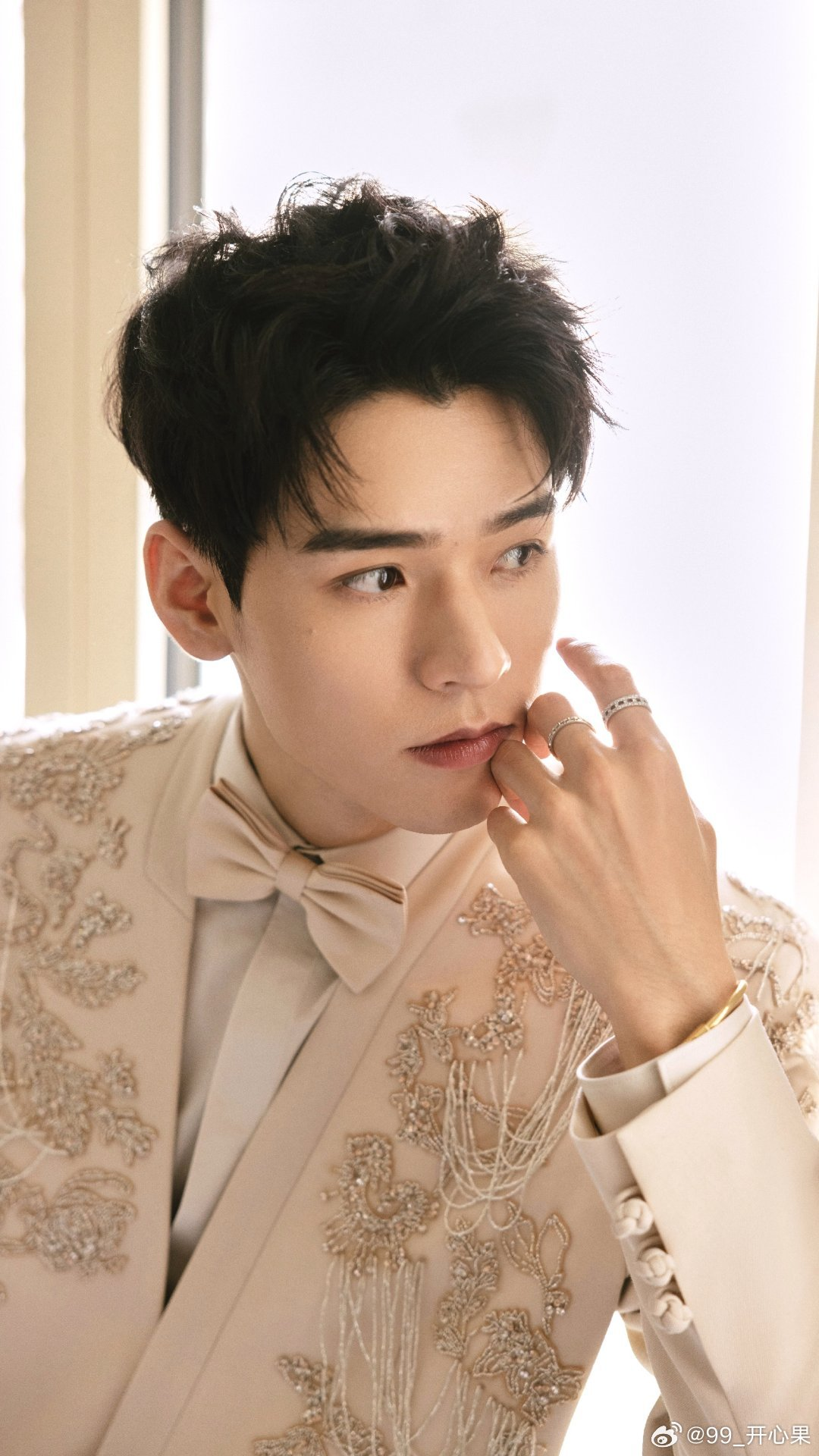
- Gong in 2023
- Born: November 29, 1992 (age 33); Chengdu, Sichuan, China
- Other name: Simon
- Education: Performance Department, Donghua University
- Occupation: Actor
- Years active: 2015–present
- Agent: Gong Jun Studio
- Known for: Hold a Court Now; Blood River; Dream Garden; Word of Honor; Begin Again
- Notable work: Shen Xiezhi - Hold a Court Now; Su Muyu - Blood River; Xu Si - Rising With the Wind; Wen Ke Xing - Word of Honor; Han Ye - The Legend of Anle
- Website: Gong Jun's Weibo

Gong Jun (Chinese: 龚俊, born November 29, 1992), also known as Simon Gong, is a Chinese actor. He gained attention for his roles in Lost Love in Times (2017) and Begin Again (2020), and achieved breakout success with Word of Honor (2021).

== Early life ==
Gong was born on November 29, 1992, in Chengdu, Sichuan, China. After graduating from the Performance Department of Donghua University in Shanghai, he moved to Beijing to pursue opportunities in the entertainment industry. He initially signed with a management company that promised him monthly assignments and living allowances, but when no jobs or wages materialized, he terminated the contract. Before making his acting debut, Gong modeled for numerous advertising campaigns.

== Career ==
=== 2015–2018: Acting debut and early beginnings ===
In 2015, Gong made his acting debut in the historical drama Sword Chaos. In 2016, he co-starred in the youth drama Advance Bravely (盛勢), adapted from Chai Ji Dan's novel Shi Bu Ke Dang (势不可挡), playing Xia Yao, a role for which he was personally selected by the author after she saw his photos on Weibo. On August 23, he appeared in the urban adventure comedy film Lost in Japan (囧日之東京大冒險).

In 2017, Gong starred in the youth fantasy drama The Player (指尖少年), based on the online game Fantasy Westward Journey, playing the game expert Ren Yi Xia. He gained wider recognition for his role as the frank, loyal, free-spirited 11th Prince Yuan Che in the fantasy historical drama Lost Love in Times (醉玲瓏), adapted from Shi Siye's novel Drunken Exquisiteness (醉玲珑). Following the drama's success, he starred in a 12-episode spin-off as the main character alongside Xu Mu Chan. On September 19, Gong appeared in the reality show The Cute Teacher Arrives (萌师驾到). On September 29, his science fiction film Rebirth Partner (異生探), co-starring Wang Wan Zhong, was released on Tencent Video, in which he played the helpful and endearing student Yi Sheng. In December, he filmed the campus idol inspirational drama Shining Like You (而你剛好發光), which was later released in 2021.

In 2018, Gong co-starred in the ancient costume drama Unique Lady Part 1 and 2 (絕世千金 and 絕世千金完結篇) based on the visual novel game Lust for Gold (好色千金), playing the domineering yet affectionate Prince Zhong Wu Mei. These projects helped Gong build his early industry experience and lay the foundation for his rising career.

=== 2019–2020: Rising popularity ===
In 2019, Gong dubbed the voice of Apollo in the French fantasy adventure animated film Tall Tales from the Magical Garden of Antoon Krings, which was released in mainland China. On November 7, he starred in the urban romance drama Flavor It's Yours (看見味道的你), which was broadcast on iQIYI; he played Lu Wei Xun, a genius wine critic who is cold and unapproachable.

In 2020, Gong starred in the campus youth drama The Love Equations (致我們甜甜的小美滿) alongside Liu Renyu, portraying Zhao Fan Zhou, a dedicated forensic science student. The series was adapted from Zhao Qian Qian's novel The Sweet Love Story (舟而复始). On October 29, the urban emotional drama Begin Again (從結婚開始戀愛), co-starring Zhou Yutong, was broadcast, in which he played Ling Rui, a mature and kind surgeon. The series attracted wide attention, boosting Gong's popularity, and garnered 1.8 billion views on Mango TV. On December 24, Unique Lady 2 (絕世千金完結篇), co-starring Zheng Qiu Hong, was broadcast on Youku and was well-received by audiences.

=== 2021–2024: Breakthrough & Stardom ===
Gong rose to prominence in 2021 for his role as the complex and morally ambiguous Chief of the Ghost Valley, Wen Ke Xing, in the Wuxia drama Word of Honor (山河令), adapted from Priest's novel Faraway Wanderers (天涯客) and broadcast on Youku. The series became a surprise hit, earning high ratings on Douban and generating significant online engagement, marking Gong's breakthrough into mainstream stardom.

Following the success of Word of Honor, Gong remained highly active across television series, variety shows, and public appearances. In the same year, four additional dramas across different genres were released, including the romantic suspense drama Dream Garden (沉睡花園), in which he portrayed the professional psychological counsellor Lin Shen, and the rescue-themed emotional drama The Flaming Heart (你好，火焰藍), where he played the introverted and determined firefighter Huo Yan. Two series filmed earlier in his career, The Player and Shining Like You, were also released that year, further expanding his screen presence.

Between 2022 and 2024, Gong headlined multiple high-profile productions, including the historical drama The Legend of Anle (安樂傳), adapted from Xing Ling's novel The Emperor's Book (帝皇书), in which he portrayed Crown Prince Han Ye; the contemporary urban workplace romance drama Rising With the Wind (我要逆風去), based on Wei Zai's novel of the same name, where he played the investor Xu Si; and Fox Spirit Matchmaker: Red-Moon Pact (狐妖小紅娘月紅篇), adapted from Tuo Xiao Xin's comic Hu Yao Xiao Hong Niang (狐妖小红娘). He also filmed two realism-based dramas scheduled for 2026: The Truth (风过留痕) as the officer Ye Qian, adapted from Jiu Di Shui (九滴水)'s novel Shi An Diao Cha Ke (尸案调查科) and Hold a Court Now (家事法庭) as a judge Shen Xie Zhi.

From 2022 to 2024, Gong maintained a strong presence in major variety programs and nationally televised events, including the China Dragon TV Spring Festival Gala, the Hundred Flowers Welcome Spring Gala organized by the China Federation of Literary and Art Circles, the CCTV Lantern Festival Gala, the Beijing TV Spring Festival Gala, the Global Chinese Music Chart on CCTV-15, and China Online Audio-Visual Ceremony. He was a regular cast member of the reality shows Chinese Restaurant 5 and Go Fighting! (seasons 8–10). During this period, he also released seven inspirational and celebratory singles, including Gong Xi Fa Cai(恭喜發財), Blessings in Spring (春意福盈), Youth Speaks (青年說), Little Shoulders (小小的肩膀), More Youthful With Ideal (有理想更青春), Chasing the Wind and Breaking the Waves (追風破浪), and Be With You (明天晴空萬里).

In 2022, Gong won the Golden Bud Network Film and Television Festival's Most Popular Actor of the Year award. In 2023, he received the Popular Actor of the Year award at Weibo Night 2022. His mainstream recognition was further reflected in 2023 when Madame Tussauds Shanghai unveiled his wax figure in the museum's E-Fashion Zone, making him the first actor featured in that section.

=== 2025–Present: Steady Development & Peak ===
In 2025, Gong's career reached a new high. His outstanding performances in variety shows such as Wow the World (地球超新鮮) and Divas Hit the Road: United Season (花兒與少年·同心季) earned him multiple honors, including Tencent Video's "Program of the Year Star" and "Tencent Video VIP Star", highlighting his growth in acting, variety shows, and commercial value. His wuxia costume drama Blood River (暗河傳), which aired in October 2025 became a major hit, surpassing 1 billion views with online popularity continuing to rise. In the fourth quarter of 2025, Gong filmed and wrapped another wuxia drama, Blade of Vengeance (白衣公卿), which won Tencent Video's "Most Anticipated Drama" even before airing, demonstrating his strong market appeal and solidifying his top-tier celebrity status.

On September 29, 2025, Hong Kong's Madame Tussauds announced that Gong Jun officially joined the museum's Fashion Zone, becoming a shining new member of the International Celebrity Hall of Fame.

== Endorsements and ambassadorships ==
=== Endorsements ===
In 2019, Gong was named as brand ambassador for men's care products Mentholatum. He was chosen as brand ambassador for skincare Little Touch, spokesperson for clinical skincare DR. WU, and officer for Youku in 2020.

With the success of the series Word of Honor, Gong commercial resources have been soaring. Partnered with 31 brands, his endorsements covered multiple categories such as sunscreen protection L'Oréal Paris, health supplements products Centrum, car brand Roewe, fast food KFC, dairy company Mengniu Dairy's ice product brand Green Mood ice-cream, beauty cosmetics 3CE Stylenanda, fruity instant coffee Nescafé, smartphone Honor, and sportswear 361 Degrees. He is also the face of luxury brands such as Louis Vuitton and Tiffany & Co.

In April 2021, Gong was announced as spokesperson for Vita lemon flavored drink, but in July Gong ceased his commercial cooperation with Vitasoy after an employee circulated a memo online offering condolences to the family of a worker who stabbed a Hong Kong policeman, then committed suicide. In the same month, Gong was announced as the global spokesperson for the Roewe, an automobile brand. This announcement came alongside the release of the Roewe RX5 PLUS Limited Edition, with Gong's image prominently featured in the campaign.

On his birthday, November 29, Gong was promoted to brand spokesperson for Ya-Man and was awarded the brand ambassador title by Tiffany. On December 1, Honor launched the Honor 60 series in China and announced Gong as the Honor 60 series global spokesperson.

In February 2022, Italian luxury brand Hogan (owned by the Tod's Group) announced Gong as its global ambassador. The shoes Gong endorsed sold out at the brand's Tmall flagship store in six hours, demonstrating his substantial influence on the luxury brand. By May 2022, Gong became brand spokesperson for 5 more brands such as Colgate, Safeguard, Mujosh, Charlotte Tilbury, and Honor 80 series.

In March 2023, Deeyeo (a famous China brand that specializes in disposable hygiene products) announced Gong as its brand spokesperson. In the same month, Gong was promoted to brand spokesperson for L'Oréal Paris. In April, a global online luxury fashion retailer Net-a-Porter announced Gong as its brand ambassador. In May, Mengniu Dairy's milk beverage line Real Fruit Milk Drink announced Gong as its brand spokesperson. In May, an Italian fashion brand RA-RE announced Gong as its global ambassador. On August 29, 2023, GXG has announced Gong as its global ambassador. On September 6, 2023, Tissot has announced Gong as its global brand ambassador. On December 11, 2023, PRSR Eyewear has announced Gong as its global brand spokesperson.

As a brand spokesperson for L'Oréal Paris, Gong was invited to attend Cannes Film Festival (from the 76th to 78th) for three consecutive years, and made his red carpet debut wearing the first custom-made menswear design by Taiwanese-Canadian designer Jason Wu - a suit adorned with sophisticated embroideries.

In May 2024, the French high-end diamond jewelry brand Messika announced Gong as its first APAC brand ambassador.

In April 2025, Gong was appointed as the global brand ambassador for Baojun, a Chinese automotive brand known for its innovative designs and technology.

=== Commercial influences ===
In 2021, Honor launched the Honor 50 series in China and announced Gong as their smartphone spokesperson. This was the firm's first major smartphone release since it was sold by Huawei. The series sales exceeded ¥500 million in one minute. This led to their market share rising by 14.6% and helped them return to the top three brands in China's mobile market. Similarly, after 361 Degrees announced Gong as their global spokesperson, their stock price soared by 14.37%. By the first half of 2021, their net profit rose 32.9% into ¥401.4 million, gained 15.7% in revenue and 28.0% in gross profit. On June 17, Roewe announced the release of 500 Roewe RX5 PLUS Limited Edition and Gong was their global spokesperson. The first batch of 100 cars sold out within 9 minutes 20 seconds, achieving a new record for cars sold every 2 seconds in a single day. After selling 100 cars per day for 5 consecutive days, the series completely sold out with a total pre-sale value of ¥644 million. On June 23, Gong was announced as brand ambassador for luxury fashion brand Louis Vuitton. On October 15, Gong was chosen as beauty ambassador for the 18th Cosmo Beauty Awards.

In March 2023, Deeyeo broke their sale record; ¥20 million of disposable hygiene products were sold within 24 hours after Gong was announced as brand ambassador.

=== Recognitions ===
In the first half of 2021, Gong gained over 8 million followers and became the most-followed and most-searched artist on Sina Weibo platform, appearing 187 times on their real-time hot search trends list. Gong was named as the hottest actor of the second quarter and was listed as one of 23 GQ's "Men of the Year".

Gong has graced the front covers of various magazines such as Harper's Bazaar, SE Weekly, OK!, Madame Figaro, Elle, Glitz, Lifestyle, Esquire, T Magazine, Cosmopolitan, L'Officiel, L'Officiel Hommes, Wonderland, GQ, and Vogue+.

== Philanthropy ==
In 2018, Gong released his first photobook, "1129". All proceeds from the book were donated to charity to support the development of public welfare undertakings. In 2020, Gong donated ¥150,000 to China Foundation for Poverty Alleviation to equip three rural schools in Nanjiang County, Sichuan Province with kitchen equipment. He was also chosen as Moji Weather Charity Ambassador and Officer for two consecutive years.

In 2021, Gong was appointed as Hello Childhood Charity Ambassador, Charity Promotional Ambassador for World Book Day, Charity Communication Ambassador for International Day for Biological Diversity, and Charity Advocacy Ambassador for World Environment Day.

In April 2021, Word of Honor's outfits were sold through online auction. Among them, the red costume of Wen Ke Xing played by Gong Jun was sold at the highest price ¥224,601 Yuan, the auction earned total ¥584,207 Yuan for Wen's costumes and accessories. After the event, his red costume proceeds were donated towards China Social Assistance Foundation as part of public welfare project. On July 21, Gong donated ¥500,000 Yuan to China Foundation for Poverty Alleviation for flood relief efforts in Henan. Gong's studio reached out to Lock & Lock donated 10,000 water bottles, 1000 blankets, 200 quilts, and 200 sets of bedding supplies to support the flood victims and disaster areas. Gong's studio and Unif Beef jointly donated further 5000 boxes of noodles to support the frontline disaster relief. Gong joined hands with 361 Degrees donated ¥10 million Yuan in cash and materials to help with flood relief and future restoration work. On July 27, as part of the sustainability program "L'Oréal for the Future", the Group has set up €50 million Euro to help with the restoration of ecological.

In April 2022, Gong donated 65,000 medical and N95 masks to help out the pandemic situation in China. He donated an additional 3,536 rapid COVID-19 antigen kits and hand sanitizers, plus 950 boxes of milk and snacks to his alma mater, Donghua University. On September 8, Gong donated ¥500,000 to support Sichuan earthquake relief efforts. In November, Gong donated the compensation amount of ¥40,000 from the defamation lawsuit and personally topped up ¥20,000 (¥60,000 in total) to the "Love Kitchen" project that serves free meals for students at a rural primary school in Guangnan County, Yunnan Province; the donation was made in the name of his fans "JunWeiXian".

In April 2023, Gong donated the compensation amount of ¥30,000 from the defamation lawsuit to the Stars and Rain Special Fund of the China Charity Aid Foundation for Children and in May he donated another ¥200,000 to the dame charity in the name of his fans "JunWeiXian". In August, Gong donated ¥300,000 to China Foundation for Rural Development in the name of his fans "JunWeiXian" for the purchase of more than 60,000 catties of rice and more than 6,500 liters of cooking oil to support flood relief in Hebei and Heilongjiang provinces.

== Filmography ==
=== Television series ===
Year	English title	Chinese title	Role	Network	Notes/Ref.
2016	Sword Chaos	刀剑缭乱	Bi Lu	iQIYI	
2017	Lost Love in Times	醉玲珑	Yuan Che	Dragon TV, Youku, Tencent, iQIYI	
2017	Lost Love in Times SP	醉玲瓏番外之玲瓏醉夢	Yuan Che	Youku	
2018	Advance Bravely	盛势	Xia Yao	Tencent	
2019	Unique Lady Part 1	绝世千金第一季	Zhong Wumei	iQIYI	
2019	Unique Lady Part 2	绝世千金第二季	Zhong Wumei	iQIYI	
2019	Flavor It’s Yours	看见味道的你	Lu Weixun	iQIYI	
2020	The Love Equations	致我们甜甜的小美满	Zhao Fanzhou	Tencent, Mango TV	
2020	Begin Again	从结婚开始恋爱	Ling Rui	Mango TV, Fujian TV, iQIYI, Tencent	
2020	Unique Lady 2	绝世千金完结篇	Zhong Wumei	Youku	
2021	Shuke and Peach Blossom	舒克与桃花	Cameo	Mango TV	Episode 12
2021	Word of Honor	山河令	Wen Kexing	Youku	
2021	The Player	指尖少年	Ren Yixia	Mango TV	
2021	The Flaming Heart	你好，火焰蓝	Huo Yan	Youku	
2021	Shining Like You	而你刚好发光	Fang Yan	Tencent	
2021	Dream Garden	沉睡花园	Lin Shen	Hunan TV, Mango TV	
2023	The Legend of Anle	安乐传	Han Ye	Youku	
2023	Rising With the Wind	我要逆风去	Xu Si	Dragon TV, iQIYI	
2024	Fox Spirit Matchmaker: Red-Moon Pact	狐妖小红娘月红篇	Dongfang Yuechu	iQIYI	
2025	Blood River	暗河传	Su Muyu/Zhuo Yue'an	Youku	
2026	The Truth	风过留痕	Ye Qian	Tencent, iQIYI	
2026	Hold a Court Now	家事法庭	Shen Xiezhi	CCTV-1, Tencent, iQIYI	
TBA	Blade of Vengeance	白衣公卿	Meng Jianqing/Ye Zhao	CCTV-1, Tencent	
TBA	The Legend of Lu Xiaofeng	凤舞九天	Lu Xiaofeng	Tencent	
TBA	Leopard in Seclusion	豹隐南山	Wen Jue	Youku	

=== Film ===
Year	English title	Chinese title	Role	Network	Notes/Ref.
2016	Lost in Japan	囧日之东京大冒险	VK		
2017	Rebirth Partner	异生探	Yi Sheng	Tencent	
2022	Master Kang Jasmine Tea 520 Mini Movie	非你茉属	Cartoonist		
2022	The Guardian of Alpine Plants	高山植物守护者			
2022	Hello, Hello	你好，你好	AI	VogueFilm	
2023	Hidden Strike (a.k.a. Project X-Traction / SNAFU)	狂怒沙暴	Hai Ming	Netflix	

=== Dubbing ===
Year	English title	Chinese title	Role	Notes/Ref.
2019	Tall Tales from the Magical Garden of Antoon Krings	虫林大作战	Apollo	

=== Television shows ===
Year	English title	Chinese title	Role	Network	Ref.
2015	Warm Taste	暖暖的味道	Guest	Beijing TV, iQIYI	
2017	The Cute Teacher Arrives	萌师驾到	Regular Member	Mango TV	
2018	Cooking For Love	为爱下厨	Guest	Tencent	
2020	Happy Camp	快乐大本营	Guest	Hunan TV, Mango TV	
2020	Departure From the End of Changjiang River	从长江的尽头回家	Guest	Jiangsu TV, Youku	
2021	Ace vs Ace: Season 6	王牌对王牌第六季	Guest	Zhejiang TV, Tencent, iQIYI, Youku	
2021	Happy Camp	快乐大本营	Guest	Hunan TV, Mango TV	
2021	Produce Camp 2021	创造营2021	Guest Mentor	Tencent	
2021	Go Fighting! Season 7	极限挑战7	Guest	Dragon TV, Youku	
2021	Sisters Who Make Waves Season 2	乘风破浪的姐姐2	Guest	Mango TV	
2021	Ace Actress	我是女演员	Guest	Jiangsu TV, Youku	
2021	The Brain Special Episode	最强大脑特别篇	Guest	Youku	
2021	Sweet Tasks	甜蜜的任务	Guest	Mango TV	
2021	Go Fridge Season 7	拜托了冰箱轰趴季	Guest	Tencent	
2021	Chinese Restaurant 5	中餐厅第五季	Regular Member	Hunan TV, Mango TV	
2021	GQ Magazine Interview - I Don't Know	我不知道啊	Guest	Tencent	
2022	Hello, Saturday	你好，星期六	Guest	Mango TV	Mar 19
2022	Back to Field Season 6	向往的生活 第六季	Guest	Mango TV	
2022	We Are The Champions	战至巅峰	Guest	Tencent	
2022	Go Fighting! Season 8	极限挑战第八季	Regular Member	Dragon TV	
2023	Hello, Saturday	你好，星期六	Guest	Mango TV	Feb 11
2023	Become a Farmer	种地吧	Guest	IQIYI	
2023	Go Fighting! Season 9	极限挑战第九季	Regular Member	Dragon TV	
2023	Hello, Saturday	你好，星期六	Guest	Mango TV	Aug 5
2024	Go Fighting! Season 10	极限挑战第十季	Regular Member	Dragon TV	
2024	Hello, Saturday	你好，星期六	Guest	Mango TV	
2025	Hello, Saturday	你好，星期六	Guest	Mango TV	Apr 5
2025	Hahahahaha Season 5	哈哈哈哈哈第五季	Guest	Tencent, iQIYI	May 24–25
2025	Mahua's Fun Age Season 2	麻花特开心第二季	Guest	Youku, Zhejiang TV	July 12
2025	Wow The World	地球超新鲜	Regular Member	Tencent	
2025	Divas Hit the Road Season 7	花儿与少年.同心季	Regular Member	Mango TV, Hunan TV	
2025	Hello, Saturday	你好，星期六	Guest	Mango TV	Oct 25
2026	Wow The World Season 2	地球超新鲜第二季	Regular Member	Tencent	

== Awards and nominations ==
Year Obtained	Award	Category	Nominated work	Result	Ref.
2021	OK! Magazine Awards	Most Anticipated Male Artist	—N/a	Won	
2021	Weibo Starlight Awards	Overseas Most Anticipated Artist	—N/a	Won	
2021	GQ Men of the Year Awards 2021	Rising Actor of the Year Award	—N/a	Won	
2021	Sohu Fashion Awards 2021	Fashion Figure of the Year	—N/a	Won	
2021	Weibo TV Series Awards	Most Popular Actor	The Flaming Heart	Won	
2022	Esquire Gentle Gala	Annual Commercial Marketable Artist Award	—N/a	Won	
2022	Golden Bud Network Film and Television Festival	Most Popular Actor of the Year	—N/a	Won	
2022	Weibo TV Series Awards	Urban Male Character of the Year - Lin Shen	Dream Garden	Won	
2023	Chinese Music Center 2022 Annual Music Report	Omni-media Most Recommended Male Singer of the Year	—N/a	Won	
2023	Weibo Night 2022	Popular Actor of the Year	—N/a	Won	
2023	Harper’s Bazaar Annual ICONS Party 2023	Most Popular ICON Award	—N/a	Won	
2023	Tencent Video All Star Night 2023	Most Charismatic Artist of the Year	Rising With the Wind	Won	
2024	Television Series of China Quality Ceremony	Quality Appealing Actor of the Year	Rising With the Wind	Won	

== Discography ==
Year	English title	Chinese title	Album	Notes	Ref.
2019	"But It Is for You"	但为君故	Unique Lady OST	with Zheng Qiuhong	
2020	"Sweet Little Satisfaction"	甜甜的小美满	The Love Equations OST	with Liu Renyu	
2020	"Youth with You"	有你的清纯	The Love Equations OST	with Liu Renyu, Yang Ge and Yan Bingyi	
2020	"Used to You"	习惯你	Begin Again OST	with Zhou Yutong	
2021	"Faraway Wanderers"	天崖客	Word of Honor Ending theme song		
2021	"Burning Medals"	滚烫勋章	The Flaming Heart OST	With Pang Hanchen, Zhou Yanchen, Lu Yupeng, Wang Yizhou and Zhang Huiwen	
2021	"Sweet"		The Flaming Heart OST		
2021	"Light Up the Future"	把未来点亮	CCTV’s May 4 Gala	With Tang Yixin and Zeng Shunxi	
2021	"Light Up the Future"	把未来点亮	Theme song for the 100th Anniversary of the Chinese Communist Party		
2021	"Beast's Flower"	野兽的花	BEAST's 10th Anniversary Commemorative Single	With Jing Boran, Ouyang Nana and Wang Xi	
2022	"May You Be Prosperous"	恭喜发财	—N/a	—N/a	
2022	"Fortuned Filled Spring"	春意福盈	—N/a	—N/a	
2022	"Youth Says"	青年说	—N/a	—N/a	
2022	"Little Shoulders"	小小的肩膀	—N/a	—N/a	
2022	"More Youthful with Ideal"	有理想更青春	Leading Into the New Era	—N/a	
2023	"Chasing the Wind, Breaking the Waves"	追风破浪	—N/a	Xinhua Net May 4 Youth Day Song	
2023	"The Love"	这份爱	Rising With the Wind OST		
2023	"Be with You"	明天晴空万里	—N/a	With Jun Wei Xian	
2025	"Divas Hit the Road"	花儿与少年	Divas Hit the Road Season 7 theme song	With Na Ying, Chen Shu, Ma Sichun, Li Qin, Zhang Yaqi and Zhang Wanyi	
2025	"The World Is Super Fun"	世界超有趣	Wow the World theme song	With Sun Honglei, Li Naiwen, Chen He, Liu Yuning, Chen Xingxu, Wang Yuwen and Ouyang Didi	

== Concert ==
Date	English title	Chinese title	Network	Location	Attendance	Ref.
May 3, 2021	Word of Honor Theme Concert	山河令生来知己演唱会	Youku	Suzhou Olympic Sports Centre	40,000	
May 4, 2021	Word of Honor Theme Concert	山河令生来知己演唱会	Youku	Suzhou Olympic Sports Centre	40,000	
