= Zhang Zhehan discography =

- Zhang in 2023
- Studio albums: 4
- Singles: 21
- Soundtracks: 13

The discography of Chinese singer Zhang Zhehan (Chinese: 张哲瀚) consists of four studio albums. His 2023 album Deep Blue sold nearly 50,000 copies in Taiwan and was certified Platinum+Gold by the Recording Industry Foundation in Taiwan (RIT). In the United Kingdom, it reached number 34 on the UK Album Downloads Chart.

== Albums ==
List of studio albums, showing selected details, sales figures, and certifications
Title	Album details	Peak chart positions		Sales	Certifications
Title	Album details	JPN Dig.	UK Down.	Sales	Certifications
Light (光)	Released: May 10, 2019; Label: Xinxi Culture; Formats: CD, digital download, streaming; Track listing: 1. Light (光); 2. Turn Around (转身); 3. The Rain in Shanghai (上海的雨)	—	—		
Another Me (我遇见我)	Released: October 11, 2020; Label: Xinxi Culture; Formats: CD, digital download, streaming; Track listing: 1. Another Me (我遇见我); 2. Deal (说好了); 3. Silent (不说)	—	—		
Deep Blue (深蓝者)	Released: April 14, 2023; Label: Shanghai Ranyi Music; Formats: CD, digital download, streaming; Track listing: 1. Melancholy Sunshine (憂傷的晴朗); 2. Knight Errant (遊俠); 3. Journey (途); 4. Primordial Theater (洪荒劇場); 5. Lost Glacier (冰川消失那天); 6. Magnificent Life (人生海海); 7. Stars Light you up (變成星星照亮你)	22	34	TWN: 50,000	RIT: Platinum+Gold
Datura (曼陀罗)	Released: February 5, 2024; Label: Shanghai Ranyi Music; Formats: CD, digital download, streaming; Track listing: 1. Datura (曼陀罗); 2. Believer (信者); 3. Moonlight (月夜的名); 4. Time to Leave (马上就离开); 5. Unfinished Journey (未完成的旅行); 6. Pressure (迫); 7. Chase (追); 8. Bad (坏); 9. No.1 Player (头号玩家)	7	—	TWN: 41,000	RIT: Platinum
Scavenger (拾荒者)	Released: July 9, 2025; Label: Shanghai Ranyi Music; Formats: CD, digital download, streaming; Track listing: 1. Can You Hear Me (聑); 2. Unchained (無礙); 3. Going Off (了); 4. 90s 5. Next (慢走不送); 6. Lost in London; 7. Earth Stranger (地球陌生人); 8. WU	—	—	TWN: 33,000	RIT: Platinum
Kaleidoscope (三鏡諭)	Released: December 10, 2025; Label: Shanghai Ranyi Music; Formats: CD, digital download, streaming; Track listing: 1. Lost Here (遁); 2. Main Price (奔); 3. Why Not (观)	—	—		

== Singles ==
Title	Year	Peak chart positions		Album	Ref.
Title	Year	JPN Dig.	UK Down.	Album	Ref.
"Starry Sea" (星辰大海)	2019	—	—	Non-album singles	
"Singing on a Clear Sky" (在晴朗的日子裡歌唱) (with various artists)	2020	—	—	Non-album singles	
"Kung Fu" (功夫)	2020	—	—	Non-album singles	
"Heart Towards the Sun" (心若向阳)	2021	—		Non-album singles	
"Surround" (環繞)	2021	—	—	Non-album singles	
"Sing a Folk Song to the Party" (唱支山歌给党听)	2021	—	—	Non-album singles	
"Melancholy Sunshine" (憂傷的晴朗憂傷的晴朗)	2022	7	13	Deep Blue	
"Knight Errant" (遊俠)	2022	9	—	Deep Blue	
"Journey" (途)	2023	—	73	Deep Blue	
"Primordial Theater" (洪荒劇場)	2023	62	—	Deep Blue	
"Lost Glacier" (冰川消失那天)	2023	—	—	Deep Blue	
"Magnificent Life" (人生海海)	2023	45	66	Deep Blue	
"Datura" (曼陀羅)	2023	—	87	Datura	
"Believer" (信者)	2023	58	89	Datura	
"Moonlight" (月夜的名)	2023	44	99	Datura	
"Time to Leave" (馬上就離開)	2023	58	93	Datura	
"Unfinished Journey" (未完成的旅行)	2023	49	91	Datura	
“Pressure” (迫)	2023	51	36	Datura	
“Chase” (追)	2023	40	97	Datura	
"Bad" (坏)	2023	44	88	Datura	
"No. 1 Player" (头号玩家)	2024	33	27	Datura	
"Can You Hear Me" (聑)	2024	39	45	Scavenger	
“Unchained” (無礙)	2024	59	—	Scavenger	
“Going Off” (了)	2024	—	87	Scavenger	
“90s”	2024	—	—	Scavenger	
“Next” (慢走不送)	2024	—	—	Scavenger	
“Lost in London”	2025	—	—	Scavenger	
“Earth Stranger” (地球陌生人)	2025	—	—	Scavenger	
“WU”	2025	—	—	Scavenger	
“Lost Here”	2025	—	—	Kaleidoscope	
“Main Price”	2025	—	—	Kaleidoscope	
“Why Not”	2025	—	—	Kaleidoscope	

== Soundtrack appearances ==
Title	Year	Album
"Women's Heart" (女人心)	2013	Crazy for Palace OST
"Graceful" (惊鸿)	2015	Legend of Ban Shu OST
"Invincible" (天下无敌) (with Yisa Yu)	2017	Above the Clouds OST
"Sighs of Yunxi" (叹雲兮) (with Ju Jingyi)	2018	Legend of Yunxi OST
"Faraway Wanderers" (天涯客) (with Gong Jun)	2021	Word Of Honor OST
"Lonely Dream" (孤梦)	2021	Word Of Honor OST
"Untitled" (无题)	2021	Word Of Honor OST
"Lonely Dream" (孤梦)	2021	Word Of Honor OST
"Ask Heaven" (天问) (with Gong Jun)	2021	Word Of Honor OST
"Faraway Wanderers" (天涯客) (with Gong Jun)	2021	Word Of Honor OST
"The Ferris Wheel is a Fool" (摩天轮是傻瓜) (with Curley Gao)	2021	The Day We Lit Up The Sky OST
"1921"	2021	1921 OST
"The Red Boat" (红船)	2021	The Red Boat OST
