= Dream Garden =

- Simplified Chinese: 沉睡花园
- Hanyu Pinyin: Chén shuì huā yuán
- Genre: Psychology; Romance; Mystery; Thriller
- Written by: Lan Baise
- Directed by: Zang Xichuan
- Starring: Gong Jun; Qiao Xin
- Country of origin: China
- Original language: Mandarin
- No. of episodes: 16

Production
- Producer: Zhao Zhuolin
- Production locations: Xiamen, China
- Running time: 70 minutes
- Production companies: Huace Film & TV; Mango TV; Hunan Television

Original release
- Network: Hunan Television; Mango TV
- Release: December 13, 2021

Dream Garden (Chinese: 沉睡花园; pinyin: Chén shuì huā yuán) is a 2021 Chinese television series starring Gong Jun and Qiao Xin in the lead roles, directed by director Zang Xichuan, produced by Mango TV and Zhejiang Huace Film & TV.

The series premiered on Hunan Television and Mango TV on December 13, 2021. It was later released in multiple countries and regions around the world, including Malaysia, Thailand, Vietnam, and North America.

Presented in an anthology format, Dream Garden builds its main plot around real social issues, highlighting current emotional themes and conveying a healing, uplifting message.

== Synopsis ==
A popular relationship blogger, Xiao Xiao (Qiao Xin), and a professional psychological counselor, Lin Shen (Gong Jun), clash over their opposing views on a relationship variety show. Hoping to improve her ability to analyze emotional issues by learning from a true professional, Xiao Xiao unexpectedly becomes Lin Shen’s assistant. Despite their initial friction, the two gradually develop mutual respect and work together to solve a series of psychological cases and crises around them, including fan delusions, internet trolling, and emotional dependency. Through these experiences and the challenges they face together, they come to realize that love itself is a kind of hypnosis, one that helps them become better versions of themselves.

== Cast ==
- Gong Jun as Lin Shen
- Qiao Xin as Xiao Xiao
- Jing Chao as Fan Qi
- Sun Yi as Yan Luo
- Zhang Duo as Shao Ning

== Reception ==
Since its premiere, the drama has consistently ranked No.1 in its time slot among provincial satellite TV channels and across seven major platforms ratings. With each episode surpassing 100 million views and total views exceeding 1.6 billion, these results demonstrate the show’s success in achieving both critical acclaim and strong viewership through the synergy of television and online platforms.
