= Begin Again =

Begin Again may refer to:

== Film and TV ==
- Begin Again (film), a 2013 film starring Keira Knightley and Mark Ruffalo
- Begin Again (South Korean TV series), a South Korean reality show
- Begin Again (Chinese TV series), a 2020 Chinese television series

== Albums ==
- Begin Again (Nutshell album), 1978
- Begin Again (Kloq album), 2013
- Fine Collection: Begin Again (Tohoshinki album), 2017
- Begin Again (Norah Jones album), 2019
- Begin Again (soundtrack)

== Songs ==
- "Begin Again" (Space song), 1998
- "Begin Again" (Taylor Swift song), 2012
- "Begin Again", a song by Colbie Caillat on her 2009 album Breakthrough
- "Begin Again", a song by Purity Ring on their 2015 album Another Eternity
- "Begin Again", a song by The Ghost Inside on their 2020 self-titled album
- "Begin Again', a song by Bury Tomorrow on their 2023 album The Seventh Sun
- "Begin Again", a song by Jessie Ware on her 2023 album That! Feels Good!
- "Begin Again (Pieces of Toast)", by Moka Only from his 2006 album The Station Agent
