= Vidfish =

Chinese video streaming platform

Vidfish Pte Ltd
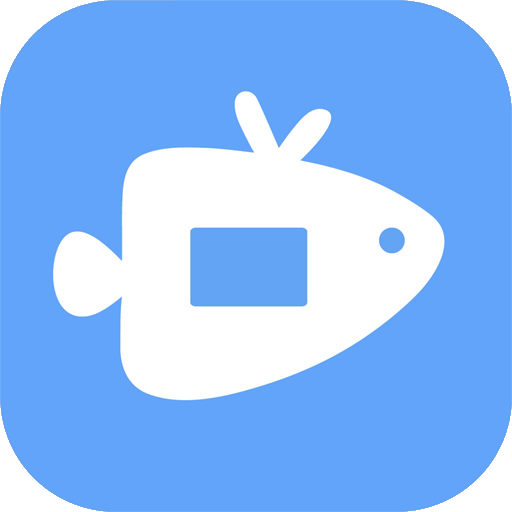
- Industry: Entertainment
- Founded: April 2018
- Headquarters: Singapore
- Services: Subscription video entertainment
- Website: vidfish.com

Vidfish is a Chinese-language video streaming platform. The brand name Vidfish is a portmanteau of the words "Video" and "Fish", of which the latter is a Chinese homonym of entertainment ("yu"). Vidfish was launched in April 2018 to 190 countries.

== Business ==
In September 2018, Vidfish debuted its subscription video on demand (SVOD) service through its Android and iPhone app, allowing users to stream videos on-the-go. The company works with a list of content partners to provide Chinese TV series and movies programming on its platform, including Tencent Video. The company also signed licensing deals with other Chinese content players, such as Hua Ce Film & TV, Mango TV, 1905, New Classics Media and Kukan Culture.

== Service ==
Popular Chinese drama and variety shows can be found on Vidfish. The content is translated into two languages, English and Bahasa Indonesian.

Vidfish primarily serves the audience in Singapore, Malaysia, Indonesia, Philippines and Taiwan.
