= Wang Ziwei =

Chinese actress (born 1996)

- Born: November 20, 1996 (age 29); Shanghai, China
- Education: Shanghai Theatre Academy, Acting Department, Class of 2015
- Occupation: Actor
- Years active: 2014–present
- Height: 165 cm (5 ft 5 in)

Chinese name
- Traditional Chinese: 王梓薇
- Simplified Chinese: 王梓薇
Transcriptions
Standard Mandarin
- Hanyu Pinyin: wáng zǐ wēi

Wang Ziwei (Chinese: 王梓薇; pinyin: wáng zǐ wēi, born on 20 November 1996), is a Chinese actress. She graduated from the undergraduate class of the Performance Department of Shanghai Theatre Academy.

== Early experiences ==
In 2014, Wang Ziwei participated in the comedy talent show ‘’Comedy Show " launched by Hubei Television, and she also had a brilliant performance in the show; in the same year, she also participated in the youth sitcom "The Extraordinary Naughty Boy" directed by Yingda.

In 2015, Wang Ziwei was admitted to the undergraduate class of the Performance Department of Shanghai Theatre Academy; in September of the same year, she began to participate in the original campus documentary reality show "Grade One Freshman" jointly launched by Hunan Television and Shanghai Theatre Academy. In the show, she and several other students from the Performance Department of Shanghai Theatre Academy followed their instructors to carry out thematic learning and assessment of a series of artistic professional knowledge such as music, performance, body shape, and dance. Wang Ziwei also attracted attention for her outstanding performance in the show.

== Film and TV Works ==
=== TV Series/Online Drama ===
First Broadcast Year	Drama Name	Role	Notes
2015	Extraordinary Naughty Boy	Qin Meimei	
2017	Ice Fantasy Destiny	Cheng Tong	Online Drama
2017	The Starry Night, The Starry Sea	Michelle/Bai Yihan	
2017	A Love So Beautiful	Lin Jingxiao	Online Drama
2018	My Idol	Xu Ziqian	Web drama
2018	The Story of Minglan	Xiao Tao	
2020	Summer Night Knows Your Warmth	Su Nuanxia	Web drama
2021	Girls Are Not Easy to Mess With	Dingdang	Web drama
2021	Qing Luo	Yu Qing Luo	Web drama
2021	The other half of me and you	Lin Jia	Web drama
2021	The Flaming Heart	Jiang Tong	Web drama
2022	Love Like the Galaxy	Five Princesses	Web drama
2023	Wulin Heroes	Wang Xiaohua	Web drama
2024	The Legend of Shen Li	Xiao Tao	
2024	Best Choice Ever	Zhu Baoqiao	
2024	The Tale of Rose	Hu Lin	
To be broadcast	Lion City Mountain and Sea		

=== Movie ===
Premiere year	Drama title	Role	Notes
2018	"Friends Circle Supernatural Events"	Xiao Ling	Online movies

== TV series ==
Year of broadcast	Date of broadcast	Broadcast platform	Program name	Notes
2014		Hubei Television	‘Comedy Show	Participated in the program recording as a student
2015		Hunan Television, Mango TV	Grade One Freshman	Participated in the program recording as a student
2018	March 2	Zhejiang Television, Tencent Video, iQiyi	Twenty-Four Hours Season 3	
2019	July 10-July 11	Hunan Television, Mango TV	Magical Chinese Characters	
