= Zhang Huiwen =

Chinese actress (born 1993)

- Born: 13 September 1993 (age 33); Yingtan, Jiangxi, China
- Education: Beijing Dance Academy
- Occupation: Actress
- Years active: 2014–present
- Agent(s): Little Orchid Entertainment (2023–present); Hesong Media (2019–2022); Le Vision Entertainment (2014–2019)
- Height: 166 cm (5 ft 5 in)

Chinese name
- Traditional Chinese: 張慧雯
- Simplified Chinese: 张慧雯
Transcriptions
Standard Mandarin
- Hanyu Pinyin: Zhāng Huìwén
Yue: Cantonese
- Jyutping: zoeng1 wai6 man4

Zhang Huiwen (simplified Chinese: 张慧雯; traditional Chinese: 張慧雯; pinyin: Zhāng Huìwén, born 13 September 1993) is a Chinese actress. She received widespread media attention after debuting in Zhang Yimou's film Coming Home (2014) and is also noted for her roles in Nirvana in Fire 2 and Ode to Joy 3.

== Early life and education ==
Zhang Huiwen was born on 13 September 1993 in Yingtan City, Jiangxi Province, China. From 2007 to 2010, she studied at the No.1 Middle School in Yingtan. In 2010, Zhang was admitted to the prestigious Beijing Dance Academy, China's leading dance institution, and graduated in 2014 with a degree in folk dance.

== Career ==
=== 2013–2016: Beginnings ===
In March 2013, while a student at the Beijing Dance Academy, Zhang was discovered by renowned film director Zhang Yimou, who hand-picked her for the role of "Dan Dan" in Coming Home due to her excellent dancing skills. Before the official filming, Zhang went to the National Ballet of China to receive special ballet training for two months, and her dance performance was also affirmed by the media.

On May 16, 2014, the film Coming Home was released nationwide. On the first day it was released, it broke the box office record for the first day of a literary film with a record of 30 million yuan. In the end, the film received nearly 300 million yuan in mainland China, breaking the box office record for Chinese domestic literary films on the release day, the speed of breaking 100 million yuan, the total number of days of release, and the total number of box offices. Zhang was highly praised for her performance and received four Best Newcomer awards at the 9th Asian Film Awards, 6th Macau International Film Festival, 22nd Beijing College Student Film Festival, and 9th Chinese Youth Video Forum. Following the success of Coming Home, Zhang (Yimou girl) frequently appeared in major fashion magazines and fashion events, becoming the new darling of the fashion industry.

In 2015, Zhang starred in the coming-of-age youth film Forever Young by He Jiong in his directorial debut. The film made US$38.5 million in its three-day opening weekend in China, debuting at first place at the Chinese box office and third worldwide behind Minions and Terminator Genisys.

In 2016, Zhang appeared in the Hong Kong police film Line Walker. The same year, Zhang starred in the youth romance film Crying Out in Love, based on Kyoichi Katayama's 2004 novel Socrates in Love.

=== 2017–present: Rising popularity ===
In 2017, Zhang made her small-screen debut in the historical wuxia drama Nirvana in Fire 2, the sequel to the critically acclaimed drama Nirvana in Fire. The series earned a Douban score of 8.5 from more than 144,766 user reviews and led to increased recognition for Zhang.

In 2019, Zhang starred in the fantasy detective film The Great Detective and was included as one of the 32 actors in the China Movie Channel Young Actors Project.

In 2020, Zhang starred in the wuxia romance drama Love a Lifetime and gained attention for her supporting role in the wuxia drama Legend of Fei.

In 2021, Zhang starred in the comedy film Overall Planning, followed by the commemoration anthology series Faith Makes Great. The same year, Zhang starred in the emergency rescue drama The Flaming Heart, historical slice of life drama Marvelous Women, and detective romance drama Heart of Loyalty.

== Social activities ==
On May 21, 2014, Zhang joined the charity "Dandelion" project at the 67th Cannes International Film Festival's media meeting ceremony, signed on the spot to support the "Dandelion" Poor Girl Dream Project, and recorded a video call to call on more people to pay attention to the education of children in poverty.

== Filmography ==
=== Film ===
Year	English title	Chinese title	Role	Notes/Ref.
2014	Coming Home	归来	Dan Dan	
2015	Forever Young	栀子花开	Yan Xi	
2016	Line Walker	使徒行者	Siu Ying	
2016	Crying Out in Love	在世界中心呼唤爱	Xia Ye	
2019	The Great Detective	大侦探霍桑	Bai Mudan	
2021	Overall Planning	日不落酒店	Ju Zi	
2026	Probation	我没错！	Lin Xiaofeng	

=== Television series ===
Year	English title	Chinese title	Role	Network	Notes/Ref.
2017	Nirvana in Fire 2	琅琊榜之风起长林	Lin Xi	Dragon TV, Beijing TV	
2020	Love a Lifetime	慕白首	Rong Hua	iQIYI, Youku	
2020	Legend of Fei	有翡	Wu Chuchu	Hunan TV, Tencent	
2021	Faith Makes Great	理想照耀中国	Liang Peiying	Hunan TV	
2021	The Flaming Heart	你好，火焰蓝	Yan Lan	Youku	
2021	Marvelous Women	当家主母	Lin Shufang	iQIYI, Tencent, Youku	
2021	Heart of Loyalty	一片冰心在玉壶	Mo Yan	Youku	
2022	Ode to Joy 3	欢乐颂3	He Minhong	Tencent	
2022	Our Times: Night Banquet in Tang Dynasty Palace	我们这十年: 唐宫夜宴	Yi Wenyan	Dragon TV, Guangdong TV, Jiangsu TV, Mango TV, Zhejiang TV, iQIYI, Tencent, Youku	
2023	Ode to Joy 4	欢乐颂4	He Minhong	CCTV-8, Tencent	
2023	The Eve	前夜	Su Nan	Beijing TV, Tencent	
2024	Ode to Joy 5	欢乐颂5	He Minhong	CCTV-8, Tencent, iQIYI	
TBA	Notes of DNA Appraiser	鉴定	Xu Ziqi	Youku	
TBA	Brave New World	旷野之境	Fang Xinyu	Youku	
TBA	Bloody Glory	浴血荣光	Yang Kaihui	CCTV-8	

=== Short film ===
Year	English title	Chinese title	Role	Notes/Ref.
2015	Who Is Your Dish 2015	谁是你的菜2015	Xiao Xiao	

=== Television show ===
Year	English title	Chinese title	Role	Network
2014	Day Day Up	天天向上	Guest	Hunan TV
2015	Happy Camp	快乐大本营	Guest	Hunan TV
2015	Smart 7	好好学吧	Guest	Hunan TV
2015	Day Day Up	天天向上	Guest	Hunan TV
2015	Keep Running	奔跑吧	Guest	Zhejiang TV
2016	Ace vs. Ace	王牌对王牌	Guest	Zhejiang TV
2016	I'm Going To School	我去上学啦	Guest	Zhejiang TV
2016	Day Day Up	天天向上	Guest	Hunan TV
2020	Bestie Day	阳光姐妹淘	Guest	Jiangsu TV
2020	The Irresistible	元气满满的哥哥	Guest	Hunan TV
2022	Youth Guard Artist	青春守艺人	Guest	Youku
2023	Hit It Off	一拍即合的我们	Regular Member	Youku
2024	Colorful Orient	华彩东方	Guest	Henan Television

== Discography ==
Year	English title	Chinese title	Album	Notes/Ref.
2019	"Starry Sea"	星辰大海		For China Movie Channel Young Actors Project with 31 other actors
2021	"Burning Medals"	滚烫勋章	The Flaming Heart OST	With Gong Jun, Pang Hanchen, Zhou Yanchen, Lu Yupeng and Wang Yizhou
2021	"Partial Preference"	偏偏偏爱	Heart of Loyalty OST	With Jeffrey Tung

== Other activities ==
=== Endorsements ===
Date	Product name
July 21, 2015	Lay's Cumin Lamb Chops Flavored Potato Chips with Lay Zhang
August 19, 2015	Rejoice Shampoo with William Chan
March 19, 2018	Fresh Skincare Brand Ambassador with Song Weilong
October 28, 2021	L'Occitane China Brand Ambassador
November 24, 2021	Chow Tai Fook Brand Friend

== Awards and nominations ==
Year	Award	Category	Nominated work	Result	Ref.
Major awards
2014	51st Golden Horse Awards	Best New Performer	Coming Home	Nominated	
2014	9th Chinese Youth Video Forum	Emerging Actress of the Year	Coming Home	Won	
2014	6th Macau International Film Festival	Best Newcomer	Coming Home	Won	
2015	9th Asian Film Awards	Best Newcomer	Coming Home	Won	
2015	16th Huading Awards	Best Newcomer	Coming Home	Nominated	
2015	18th Shanghai International Film Festival	Asian New Talent Award Best Actress	Coming Home	Nominated	
2015	22nd Beijing College Student Film Festival	Best Newcomer	Coming Home	Won	
2015	15th Chinese Film Media Awards	Best New Actor	Coming Home	Nominated	
2015	30th Golden Rooster Awards	Best Supporting Actress	Coming Home	Nominated	
Other awards
2014	67th Cannes International Film Festival	Best Dressed Award	—N/a	Won	
2014	Yoka Fashion Awards	Emerging Role Model Award	—N/a	Won	
2015	16th Golden Oak Awards Ceremony	Newcomer of the Year	Coming Home	Won	
2017	Weibo Fashion Festival	Most Promising New Female Celebrity	—N/a	Won	
2017	OnlyLady & KIMISS Fashion Awards	Popular Actress Award	—N/a	Won	
2017	Men's Uno Young Annual Party	Most Capable Actress	—N/a	Won	
