= Hu Yixuan =

Hu Yixuan may refer to:

- Hu Yixuan (swimmer)
- Hu Yixuan (actress)
