= Unforgettable Love =

2021 Chinese drama

- Genre: Romance
- Based on: Mr He's Love is Not Forgotten by Qin Ye
- Directed by: Li Yulei
- Starring: Wei Zheming; Hu Yixuan
- Opening theme: It's you by Ding Ding
- Ending theme: 明明喜欢你 by Wei Zheming
- No. of episodes: 24

Production
- Producer: Tang Fan
- Running time: 41 mins
- Production companies: Mango Excellent Media; Mango TV; Mango Studios

Original release
- Network: Mango TV
- Release: July 10, 2021

Unforgettable Love (Chinese: 贺先生的恋恋不忘) is a 2021 Chinese romance television series, starring Wei Zheming, Hu Yixuan, co-starring Sheng Huizi, Yu Yijie, Shi Qingyan, Wu Chongxuan and Sun Sicheng. The series is based on the novel Mr He's Love is Not Forgotten (贺少的闪婚暖妻) by Qin Ye. It revolves around He Qiaoyan, CEO of Heshi Group, and Qin Yiyue, a child psychologist. The series premiered on Mango TV from July 10, 2021, and is also available on iQiyi app and iQ.com.

== Synopsis ==
He Qiaoyan (Wei Zheming), CEO of Heshi Group, and Qin Yiyue (Hu Yixuan), a child psychologist, start a contract marriage for the sake of He Qiaoyan's young nephew Xiaobao (Sun Sicheng). But the rational, distant, indifferent CEO and the soft, optimistic, considerate, and meticulous psychologist, as they come to know and understand each other, come to fall in love.

== Cast ==
=== Main ===
- Wei Zheming as He Qiaoyan (CEO of Heshi group), Qin Yiyue's husband, Xiaobao's uncle who became a father.
- Hu Yixuan as Qin Yiyue (a child psychologist), He Qiaoyan's wife, Xiaobao's mother and doctor.

==== People related to He Qiaoyan ====
- Sun Sicheng as He Weifei (Xiaobao)
- Yu Yijie as Wen Gu (He Qiaoyan's best friend)
- Shi Qingyan as Lin Wei
- Lu Yong as Mr. Wen (Wen Gu's father)
- Zhang Ruijia as He Jiaqin (He Qiaoyan's aunt)
- Xu Yanghao as He Qiaonian (He Qiaoyan's elder brother, Xiaobao's biological father)
- Ren Jie as Mrs. Liu
- Hu Yixuan as Qin Yiyue (mother of xiaobao)

==== People related to Qin Yiyue ====
- Sheng Huizi as Yang Ruowei (Qin Yiyue's best friend)
- Wu Chongxuan as Ning Fang (Qin Yiyue's senior brother)
- Liu Wei as Qin Qiuyang (Qin Yiyue's father)
- Zhang Li as Luo Mingmei (Qin Yiyue's mother)
- Li Yitong as Ai Qing( Qin Yiyue's younger sister)
- Nina Wang as Ai Jing (Qin Yiyue's older sister)

==== Heshi Group ====
- Xie Xintong as Zhong Peishan (He Qiaoyan's secretary)
- Wang Jinduo as Ma Fada (He Qiaoyan's assistant)

==== Yade Hospital ====
- Zhang Haolun as Zhou Ziyang (Qin Yiyue's ex-boyfriend)
- Pu Yutong as Ye Qing
- Zhan Zitong as Xiao An
- Zhu Guoyu as President Ye
- Zhao Weiguo as Director Huang

== Production ==
The series began filming in September 2020 in Changsha, China, and wrapped up in November 2020.
