= The Truth (Chinese TV series) =

2026 Chinese television series

- Official poster for The Truth
- Chinese: 风过留痕
- Hanyu Pinyin: Fēng guò liú hén
- Genre: Crime; Action; Thriller; Police procedural
- Based on: Shi An Diao Cha Ke (尸案调查科） by Jiu Di Shui
- Written by: Lin Jidong
- Directed by: Zhang Tong
- Starring: Gong Jun; Jiang Wu; Sun Yi
- Country of origin: China
- Original language: Mandarin
- No. of episodes: 30

Production
- Producers: Liu Xu, Luo Wenqi
- Production location: China
- Running time: 45 minutes
- Production companies: Tencent Video; Laoyou Yingshi

Original release
- Network: Tencent Video, iQIYI
- Release: 3 February – 14 February 2026

The Truth (Chinese: 风过留痕; pinyin: Fēng guò liú hén) is a 2026 Chinese television series co-produced by Tencent and Laoyou Yingshi, directed by Zhang Tong, adapted from the novel "Shi An Diao Cha Ke" (尸案调查科) by Jiu Di Shui. It starred Gong Jun, Jiang Wu, and Sun Yi in the leading roles.

== Plot ==
The series is set in Forensic Technology Division of the Yunxi City Public Security Bureau, where Captain Leng Qiming (played by Jiang Wu) leads a young and elite investigation team comprising Ye Qian (played by Gong Jun), Si Yuanlong, Jiao Lei, and Zhang Ziwu. Through forensic analysis, psychological profiling, and other advanced investigative techniques, the team unravels a series of bizarre and intricate cases. Guided by the creed of "decoding the language of death and safeguarding the dignity of life", they seek into each mystery to uncover the truth and uphold justice.

== Cast ==
- Gong Jun as Ye Qian
- Jiang Wu as Leng Qiming
- Sun Yi as Dan Qing
- Zhang Kaitai as Si Yuanlong
- Wang Mengli as Han Zhao
- Liu Hailan as Zhang Ziwu

== Production ==
On 27 May 2023, the main leads, along with the producers and the production companies were announced. The opening ceremony was held on the same day. The series wrapped up filming on 18 July 2023. On 1 February 2026, the series is scheduled to premiere on 3 February 2026 on Tencent Video and iQIYI.
