= Begin Again (Chinese TV series) =

- Chinese: 从结婚开始恋爱
- Genre: Romance
- Based on: Samee Ngern Phon by Pitchaya Turdkwanchai
- Directed by: Xu Chi
- Starring: Zhou Yutong; Gong Jun
- Country of origin: China
- Original language: Mandarin
- No. of episodes: 35

Production
- Producer: Yu Hui
- Production location: China
- Running time: 45 minutes
- Production companies: Mango TV, EE-Media, Yuan Yi Media

Original release
- Network: Mango TV
- Release: 29 October – 6 December 2020

Begin Again (Chinese: 从结婚开始恋爱), is a 2020 Chinese television series co-produced by Mango TV, EE-Media and Yuan Yi Media, directed by Xu Chi. It starred Zhou Yutong and Gong Jun in the leading roles. The series aired on Mango TV from 29 October to 6 December with 35 episodes.

== Synopsis ==
Lu Fang Ning, a domineering CEO of a large home furnishings corporation, is wealthy and capable. Due to family pressure, she desperately needs to find a husband whom she can have a child with before she turns 30. Ling Rui is a handsome and talented surgeon who has a kind heart. Fang Ning views Ling Rui as an ideal candidate for marriage and thus uses all possible means to make him sign a one-year marriage contract with her. After marriage they experience ups and downs; they gradually fall for each other and develop into a genuine romantic relationship.

== Cast ==
- Zhou Yutong as Lu Fangning
- Gong Jun as Ling Rui
- Jin Ze as Lu Yiyao
- Wu Mansi as Chai Siyu
