= The Last Bloom Fades =

Upcoming Chinese television series

- Traditional Chinese: 開到荼蘼
- Simplified Chinese: 开到荼蘼
- Hanyu Pinyin: Kāi dào túmí
- Genre: Revenge drama
- Based on: The Last Bloom Fades (开到荼蘼) by Yi Shu
- Written by: Lu Tian
- Directed by: Li Muge
- Starring: Bai Lu; Gao Haining; Chang Huasen; Peng Guanying
- Country of origin: China
- Original language: Mandarin

Production
- Production companies: Tencent Video; Chenghao Pictures

Original release
- Network: Tencent Video

The Last Bloom Fades (Chinese: 开到荼蘼) is an upcoming Chinese revenge drama television series written by Lu Tian and directed by Li Muge. Starring Bai Lu, Gao Haining, Chang Huasen, and Peng Guanying, the series is based on the novel of the same name by Yi Shu and depicts the downfall and revenge of a wealthy woman in the late 1990s whose life is ruined after she is betrayed and imprisoned. It was unveiled as part of Tencent Video's 2027 drama lineup.

== Premise ==
Set between 1995 and 1999, the series follows Wang Yunna, whose wealthy life collapses after she is betrayed and imprisoned. Years later, she returns and becomes entangled in complex emotional conflicts and revenge involving her former lover Teng Haiqi and fashion designer Zuo Wensi.

== Cast ==
- Bai Lu as Wang Yunna, a wealthy woman who is framed and imprisoned by her lover Teng Haiqi, and later returns under a new identity seeking revenge.
- Gao Haining as Wei Shudong, Teng Haiqi's wife and Zuo Wensi's older sister.
- Chang Huasen as Zuo Wensi, a fashion designer who becomes romantically involved with Wang Yunna.
- Peng Guanying as Teng Haiqi, Wang Yunna's childhood sweetheart and her father's business partner who betrays her and later marries into Zuo Wensi's family.

== Production ==
Adapted from the 1987 novel of the same name by Yi Shu, the series was produced by Tencent Video and Chenghao Pictures. It was first unveiled in Tencent Video's annual drama lineup in June 2021. Ahead of its filming, it drew media comparisons to the 2024 drama The Tale of Rose. The project marks Bai Lu's first contemporary television series in three years and her first drama production following the expiration of her contract with Huanyu Entertainment. Dong Runnian served as script supervisor, while Ying Luojia and Shen Rong as general planners. Principal photography commenced on July 24, 2026, in Foshan, Guangdong. In August 2026, following online fan complaints alleging script changes and expanded screen time for supporting characters, Bai Lu issued a public statement clarifying that she had received the complete script prior to filming and that routine on-set adjustments were normal industry practice. Filming concluded in early October 2026, followed by the release of a behind-the-scenes wrap special.

== Release ==
The Last Bloom Fades was included in Tencent Video's 2027 lineup during its annual Shanghai conference on October 28, 2026, where the platform also unveiled the 16-episode drama's first promotional trailer and character posters.

Taiwanese media outlets have previewed the adaptation of Yi Shu's novel, noting its narrative direction and casting. Coverage highlighted how the 16-episode adaptation streamlined the novel's bleak, morally ambiguous relationships into a revenge drama. TVBS described it as one of the author's darkest works. Commentators also remarked on Bai Lu's shift from her earlier historical roles to a darker modern role as seen in the trailer and wrap special.
