= Wei Zheming =

Chinese actor and singer (born 1990)

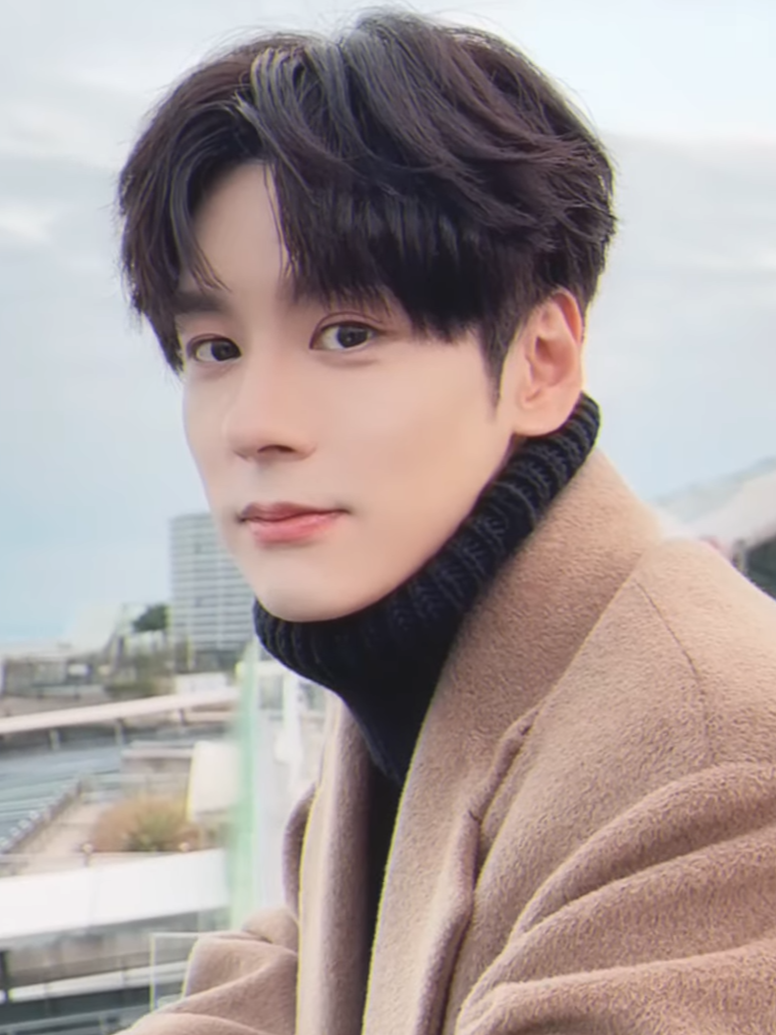
- Wei in 2023
- Born: May 23, 1990 (age 36); Jining, Shandong, China
- Other name: Miles Wei
- Education: Tianjin Normal University
- Occupations: Actor; singer
- Years active: 2012–present
- Agent: CP Entertainment
- Height: 183 cm (6 ft 0 in)
- Spouse: Unknown (m. 2015; div. 2016)
- Musical career
- Genres: Mandopop
- Instrument: Vocals
- Formerly of: Decision Team

Chinese name
- Simplified Chinese: 魏哲鸣
- Hanyu Pinyin: Wèi Zhémíng

Wei Zheming (Chinese: 魏哲鸣; pinyin: Wèi Zhémíng; born May 23, 1990), also known as Miles Wei, is a Chinese actor and singer. He is known for his roles in Count Your Lucky Stars (2020), Perfect and Casual (2020), Unforgettable Love (2021), Only for Love (2023), 19th Floor (2024), You Are My Secret (2024), and Flourished Peony (2025).

== Discography ==
=== Soundtrack appearances ===
Year	Title	Album
2017	"Pretend to Care" (假装计较)	The Endless Love OST
2019	"The Answer" (谜底)	Unrequited Love OST
2019	"Brave Heart" (勇敢的心) (with Zhang He)	Rush Into Danger OST
2021	"Obviously Like You" (明明喜欢你)	Unforgettable Love OST
2021	"Fall in Love"	If The Voice Has Memory OST
2023	"Freeze in Here" (在此定格) (with Wang Feifei)	My Marvellous Fable OST
2023	"Acquiescence" (默许)	Echo of Her Voice OST

== Filmography ==
=== Films ===
Year	English Title	Chinese Title	Role	Ref.
2017	Psychological Warning Record: Gambler	心理警示录之大赌徒	An Yuan	
2017	Ren Xue Jun Xun	热血军训	Lu Hui	
2018	The Yin and Yang Formula	阴阳诀之祭情	Xi Lansheng	
2020	The Wizard of Penglai	蓬莱仙踪	Lu Dongbin	
2022	Peach Blossom Origin	桃花缘起	Fan Yihang	

=== Television series ===
Year	English Title	Chinese Title	Role	Notes	Ref.
2017	Love Nagging	爱情碎碎念	Lu Fan		
2017	The Endless Love	路从今夜白	Wei Zijian		
2017	Dragon Day, You're Dead	龙日一，你死定了	Long Haiyi		
2018	Dragon Day, You're Dead Season 2	龙日一，你死定了2	Long Haiyi		
2019	My Amazing Boyfriend 2	我的奇妙男友2	Jiang Yiheng		
2019	Wait, My Youth	等等啊我的青春	Pei Yan	Cameo (Ep. 18)	
2019	Fall in Love	当她恋爱时	Tang Haoyun		
2019	Rush Into Danger	极速救援	Yu Fei		
2020	Find Yourself	下一站是幸福	Chang Huan		
2020	Count Your Lucky Stars	我好喜欢你	Lu Yanzhi		
2020	Perfect and Casual	完美先生和差不多小姐	Zhang Sinian		
2020	My Supernatural Power	我有特殊沟通技巧	Xu Zhe		
2021	Word of Honor	山河令	Jing Beiyuan	Cameo	
2021	Twelve Legends	十二谭	Meng Mo	Cameo (Ep. 25-26)	
2021	Unforgettable Love	贺先生的恋恋不忘	He Qiaoyan		
2021	If Voice Has Memory	如果声音有记忆	Lin Nan		
2023	My Marvelous Fable	夏日奇妙书	Feng Tianlan		
2023	Hello, I'm at Your Service	金牌客服董董恩	Lou Yuan		
2023	Rising With the Wind	我要逆风去	Gao Yi		
2023	Only for Love	以爱为营	Yu You		
2023	I May Love You	对你不止是喜欢	Tang Yu		
2024	19th Floor	19层	Gao Xuan / Zhao Lei		
2024	White Cat Legend	大理寺少卿游	Qiu Qingzhi		
2024	Lady Revenger Returns from the Fire	披荆斩棘的大小姐	Xu Chengfeng		
2024	Fox Spirit Matchmaker: Red-Moon Pact	狐妖小红娘月红篇	A Lai		
2024	You Are My Secret	私藏浪漫	Ji Yuheng		
2024	Echo of Her Voice	幻乐森林	Yun Mu		
2025	Flourished Peony	国色芳华	Liu Chang		
2025	In the Name of Blossom|	锦绣芳华	Liu Chang		
2026	You Are My Fateful Love	你是迟来的欢喜	Xu Huaisong		
2026	Love Beyond the Grave	白日提灯	Yan Ke		
2026	Blossom through the Cloud	飞到我心上	Fu Mingyu		
TBA	Nirvana in Flames	凤不栖	Xiao Jue		
TBA	Tian Du Yi Wen Lu	天都异闻录	Su Xuelou		

=== Television shows ===
Year	English Title	Chinese Title	Role	Ref.
2020	Super Nova Games Season 3	超新星运动会第三季	Contestant	
2023	Call Me by Fire Season 3	披荆斩棘第三季	Cast member	

== Awards and nominations ==
Year	Award	Category	Nominee(s)/Work(s)	Result	Ref.
2024	Weibo TV & Internet Video Summit	Qinyun Annual Breakthrough Actor	Wei Zheming	Won	
2024	iQIYI Scream Night	Top 10 Actor of the Year	Wei Zheming	Won	
