= Fox Spirit Matchmaker: Red-Moon Pact =

2024 Chinese television series

- Genre: Fantasy, Adventure, Romance
- Based on: Fox Spirit Matchmaker by Tuo Xiaoxin
- Directed by: Mai Guanzhi, Du Lin
- Starring: Yang Mi, Gong Jun
- Country of origin: China
- Original language: Mandarin
- No. of seasons: 1
- No. of episodes: 36

Production
- Producers: Dai Ying, Wang Yixu, Zhang Yucheng
- Running time: 45 minutes
- Production companies: Stellar Media, iQIYI

Original release
- Network: iQIYI
- Release: 23 May – 11 June 2024

Fox Spirit Matchmaker: Red-Moon Pact (Chinese: 狐妖小红娘月红篇) is a Chinese television series based on Chinese romance comic Fox Spirit Matchmaker (Chinese: 狐妖小红娘) painted by Tuo Xiaoxin. It stars Yang Mi and Gong Jun.

== Synopsis ==
The story is about a fox spirit Tushan Honghong who saves a human youth, Dongfang Yuechu, both spending time together in Tushan and fighting against the evil for peace between the fox clan and human clan.

== Cast ==
=== Main ===
- Yang Mi as Tushan Honghong

Chief of Tushan. 700 years ago, she ended the war between human race and spirit clan by killing the former Tushan chief Shi Ji.

- Gong Jun as Dongfang Yuechu

Human youth pursued by his lifelong enemy, raised in Tushan. The leader of YiQi Alliance.

=== Supporting ===
- Guo Xiaoting as Tushan Yaya

Deputy chief of Tushan and Tushan Honghong and Tushan Rongrong's sister

- Wei Zheming as A Lai
- Hu Lianxin as Tushan Rongrong

Third chief of Tushan and Tushan Honghong and Tushan Yaya's sister

- Wen Zhengrong as Shi Ji

Former chief of Tushan who started the war between human race and spirit clan. 700 years ago, she was killed by Tushan Honghong.

- Zhu Xudan as Bu Tai

Princess of Spirit Master Kingdom

- An Yuexi as Dongfang Qinlan

Dongfang Yuechu's mother

- Han Dong as Wangquan Hongye

Head of Yiqi Alliance

- Wang Zirui as Bai Lou

Dongfang Yuechu's father

- Feng Xiaotong as Dongfang Luo

=== Guest appearances ===
- Liu Shishi as Dongfang Huaizhu

Older sister of Dongfang Qinlan and Wangquan Hongye's wife

== Production ==
On September 22, 2022, the main leads along with the production team were announced. The boosting ceremony was held on the same day.
