= Bai Bingke =

Chinese actress (born 2001)

- Born: February 22, 2001 (age 25); China
- Other name: Angel Bai
- Education: Shanghai Theatre Academy
- Occupation: Actress
- Years active: 2022–present
- Agent(s): Shanghai Films and Media
- Height: 165 cm (5 ft 5 in)

Chinese name
- Simplified Chinese: 白冰可
- Hanyu Pinyin: Bái Bīngkě

Bai Bingke (Chinese: 白冰可; pinyin: Bái Bīngkě, born February 22, 2001) is a Chinese actress under Shanghai Films and Media. She is known for her roles in Sword and Fairy (2024), Wrong Carriage, Right Groom (2023), and Si Jin (2025).

== Filmography ==
=== Television series ===
Year	Title	Role	Ref.
2022	Knight of the Rose	Xiao Jiang	
2023	A Portrait of Jianghu: Reincarnated Disciple	Huang Quan	
2023	The Legend of Anle	Mo Shuang	
2023	Wrong Carriage Right Groom	Du Bingyan	
2024	Sword and Fairy	Ming Xiu	
2024	The Silent Storm	Wei Lele	
2025	Everlasting Longing	Xuan Qingkou	
2025	Si Jin	Lu Chuchu	
2025	Shine on Me	Ye Rong	
2026	Tigers Sniff the Rose	Zhao Lingfei	
TBA	Flowers in a Mirror	Ding Ding	
TBA	Da Tang Mi Wu	Qing Yan	

== Awards and nominations ==
Year	Award	Category	Nominee(s)/Work(s)	Result	Ref.
2024	Tencent Video Star Awards	Best Newcomer in a Television Series	Bai Bingke	Won	
