= The Legend of Anle =

2023 Chinese television series

- Also known as: An Le Zhuan
- Chinese: 安乐传
- Genre: Historical; Romance
- Based on: The Emperor's Book by Xing Ling
- Written by: Xuan Zhao, Xin Ran Li, Xing Xuan Lu, Xue Leng
- Directed by: Cheng Zhi Chao; Ma Hua Gan; Su Fei
- Starring: Dilraba Dilmurat; Gong Jun
- Country of origin: China
- Original language: Mandarin
- No. of seasons: 1
- No. of episodes: 39 episodes

Production
- Producer: Liu Jia Li
- Production location: Hengdian World Studios
- Running time: 45 minutes per episode
- Production companies: Youku; Shanghai Films & Media Corporation

Original release
- Network: Youku
- Release: 12 July – 6 August 2023

The Legend of Anle (Chinese: 安乐传), also known as An Le Zhuan, is a Chinese historical streaming television series co-produced by Youku, and Shanghai Films & Media Corporation and directed by Cheng Zhi Chao, Ma Hua Gan, and Su Fei. It was adapted from the web novel The Emperor's Book (Chinese: 帝皇书) by Xing Ling and stars Dilraba Dilmurat and Gong Jun. The series started airing on Youku on July 12, 2023.

== Synopsis ==
This is a sad and touching love story between Di Ziyuan (played by Dilraba Dilmurat) and Crown Prince Han Ye (played by Gong Jun). Ten years ago, her family was wiped out and Ziyuan was the sole survivor. For the peace of the nation and to uncover the truth of how had the current imperial family ascended to the throne, she enters the imperial court under the name of Ren Anle. Ziyuan becomes acquainted with the Crown Prince and they began to investigate a case of foreign aggression against the nation. Though love starts to blossom between the two, the enmity between their families over the Di family massacre puts a tension on the relationship between.

== Cast ==
- Dilraba Dilmurat as Ren Anle / Di Ziyuan
- Gong Jun as Han Ye
- Liu Yuning as Luo Mingxi
- Xia Nan as Princess Anning
- Yang Mingna as Empress Dowager Sun
- Tim Pei as Mo Bei / Leng Bei
- Chen Tao as Wen Shuo / Di Jin Yan
- Li Shu Ting as Di Chengen
- Wang Yi Ting as Lin Lang
- Long Shui Ting as Yuan Shu
- Shang Xin Yue as Yuan Qin
- Qin Xiao Xuan as Mu Qing
- Ning Xiao Hua as Bai Zhan
- Zong Feng Yan as Han Zhongyuan
- Chen Jing De as Xu Hanmo
- Zhang Yi Kai as Ji Li
- Bai Bingke as Mo Shuang

== Soundtrack ==
The Legend of Anle OST (Chinese: 安乐传 原声大碟)
| No. | Title | Lyrics | Music | Singer | Length |
|---|---|---|---|---|---|
| 1. | "Missing You" (Chinese: 念你; Opening Theme Song) | Zhao Subing | Han Zongyan, Lu Anrui | Sunnee |
| 2. | "May the Light" (Chinese: 愿光; Ending Theme Song) | Zhao Subing | Jiang Haicheng, Lu Anrui | Liu Yuning |
| 3. | "Wishing Star" (Chinese: 星盼) | Zhao Subing, Yuan Ye | Ding Jiayu, Liu Zhaolun | Alan Dawa Dolma |
| 4. | "Heartfelt Promise" (Chinese: 心上诺) | Zhao Subing | Xian Jianing, Liu Zhaolun | Li Xinyi |
| 5. | "Continued Song" (Chinese: 续长歌) | Yang Dongying | Ma Yuan | Meng Jia and Zhang Yuan |
| 6. | "Without" (Chinese: 无罔) | Lin Qiao, Ling Bo | Tian Wu | A YueYue |

== Production ==
In July 2021, the main leads, along with the producers and the production companies were announced. The opening ceremony was held on the same day. The series was set to film in Hengdian World Studios from July 20. On August 14, the series revealed the first poster of the main leads Dilraba Dilmurat and Gong Jun to celebrate Qixi Festival. On September 19, they officially released drama stills of the cast to celebrate Mid Autumn Festival. The series wrapped up filming on November 13, along with a set of posters from the cast.
