= Blood River (TV series) =

2025 Chinese TV series

- Also known as: Tales of Dark River
- Chinese: 暗河传
- Genre: Wuxia; Thriller
- Based on: An He Zhuan by Zhou Munan
- Written by: Zhou Munan; Lin Conghe
- Directed by: Yin Tao
- Starring: Gong Jun
- Country of origin: China
- Original language: Mandarin
- No. of episodes: 38

Production
- Producers: Zhou Shuaibo; Mu Jingwen
- Production location: Hengdian World Studios
- Running time: 45 minutes
- Production companies: Youku; Youkeneng Yingye; Shengge Yingshi

Original release
- Network: Youku
- Release: 20 October – 8 November 2025

Blood River (Chinese: 暗河传; pinyin: Àn hé zhuàn), formerly known as Tales of Dark River, is a 2025 Chinese television series starring Gong Jun and directed by Yin Tao. Adapted from the wuxia novel An He Zhuan (Chinese: 暗河传) by Zhou Munan, the story follows the assassin Su Muyu (苏暮雨) as he strives to pull Blood River guild out of the shadows and forge a new destiny, free from being anyone's blade. The drama premiered on Youku and Netflix on 20 October 2025.

== Synopsis ==
Blood River, an organization formed by the Su, Xie, Mu families, is led by the patriarch. Under him is a direct assassin unit called Spider-Shadow, which has the power to topple sects and strike down royals. When the patriarch is poisoned during a mission, the fragile alliance between the three clans shatters, plunging them into a ruthless struggle for power.

Su Muyu (played by Gong Jun), leader of the elite Spider-Shadow unit, protects the dying patriarch on a perilous quest for a cure and becomes entangled in the deadly conflict that follows. Together with the elder Su Zhe (played by Qiao Zhenyu) and his childhood friend Su Changhe (played by Chang Huasen), Su Muyu launches the "Other Shore Plan" to draw Blood River out of the shadows and forge a new destiny free from being anyone's blade. As political schemes and hidden ambitions come to the surface, he uncovers the long-buried secrets of his own past. Torn between loyalty, destiny, and survival, he remains steadfast in his convictions.

== Cast ==
=== Main ===
- Gong Jun as Su Muyu (苏暮雨)

Originally named Zhuo Yue'an (卓月安), he was the young master of No-Sword City. After a family tragedy, he became the Nameless of the Su family in Blood River.

Known as "Kui," he is the leader of the Spider Shadow assassin unit, which operates directly under the Blood River patriarch and commands the twelve Zodiacs in his service. He is skilled in wielding a hidden sword concealed within his umbrella, has mastered the Eighteen Sword Array, and is known by the codename Umbrella Ghost. He lives by his personal creed, the Three Refusals: no slaughtering entire families, no missions without clear cause, and no missions he does not wish to take. In time, he rises to become the new Head of the Su.

=== Supporting ===
==== Blood River ====
- Geng Le as Su Mingce (慕明策), the former patriarch of Blood River, who held authority for thirty years and ruled over the three clans: Su, Xie, Mu.

===== Spider Shadow Assassin Unit: Twelve Zodiacs =====
Led by Kui and operates under Blood River patriarch

- Chen Shengwei as Rat (子鼠)
- Cheng Tao as Ox (丑牛), killed by Xie Buxie after betraying the Spider's Shadow and being poisoned.
- Shi Xiaohu as Tiger (寅虎), birth name being Xie Huxiao
- Peng Xiaoran as Mu Yumo (慕雨墨) Mao Rabbit (卯兔), the most beautiful woman of Blood River
- He Junhao as Dragon (辰龍), killed by Mu Zizhe while protecting the Sleeping Dragon Sword.
- Pan Mingyun as Snake (巳蛇), from the Mu family
- Fan Chengqi as Horse (午馬)
- Yang Jian as Goat (未羊)
- Shen Longlong as Monkey (申猴)
- Zheng Lingpeng as Rooster (酉雞)
- Dong Chengxin as Dog (戌狗)
- Zhao Qiusheng as Pig (亥豬)

===== The Su Clan =====
- Qiao Zhenyu as Su Zhe (苏喆), the former "Kui" and the father of Bai Hehuai. He is the elder of the Su Family.
- Chang Huasen as Su Changhe (苏昌河), codename Undertaker and the Nameless of the Su Family, is the rising star of the Su Family and a longtime friend of Su Muyu, skilled in wielding dual daggers. He eventually becomes the new patriarch.
- Hou Changrong as Su Jinhui (苏烬灰), the former Head of the Su, left Blood River after being defeated by Su Changhe.
- Xu Ruihao as Su Changli (苏昌离), the Nameless of the Su Family and the younger brother of Su Changhe
- Huang Wei as Su Zhi (苏止)
- Jin Kaijie as Su Muqiu (苏穆秋)
- Wang Huiyi as Su Hongxi (苏红息)
- Liu Yuqi as Su Ziyi (苏紫衣)
- Wu Zhengrong as Su Luandan (苏栾丹)
- Wu Jiahui as Su Xiamo (苏协莫)

===== The Xie Clan =====
- Hei Zi as Xie Ba (谢霸), the former Head of the Xie, killed by Xie Qidao
- Yang Kaicheng as Xie Fanhua (谢繁花), disciple of Xie Ba, killed by Xie Qianji
- Liu Zhe'er as Xie Qidao (谢七刀), becomes the Head of the Xie
- Liu Yuhan as Xie Qianji (谢千机)
- Huang Yi as Xie Buxie (谢不谢), disciple of Xie Qidao
- Li Junmo as Xie Jinke (谢金克)

===== The Mu Clan =====
- Zhang Duo as Mu Zizhe (慕子蛰), the former Head of the Mu, committed suicide after being defeated by Mu Ciling
- Tang Shaowen as Mu Bai (慕白), son of Mu Zizhe, killed by Mu Qingyang with a single palm strike
- Li Daikun as Mu Ciling (慕词陵), was confined in a coffin because he stole the Hell Palm's manual from the patriarch and cultivated it in secret
- Snow Kong as Mu Xuewei (慕雪薇), known as the "Poisonous Blossom", whose body is filled with poison from practicing the Toxic Sand Palm and who can kill with a single touch. The poison in her body is later removed by Night Crow.
- Gao Jicai as Mu Qingyang (慕青羊), the Nameless of the Mu family, fond of fortune-telling and becomes the Head of the Mu
- Wang Zuyi as Mu Yinzhen (慕阴真)
- Su Qi as Mu Ying (慕婴), formerly the Ferryman of Yellow Springs Pawnshop, skilled in the art of disguise. She was taken away by Su Changhe and later entrusted to the Mu Family.
- He Yongsheng as the former Head of the Mu

===== Soul Reapers' Hall =====
An organization established by the Shadow Sect to gather and transmit intelligence for Blood River

- Dai Jingyao as Earth Official (地官)
- Li Guo as Heaven Official (天官)
- Wang Xuan as Water Official (水官)

==== Medicine King Valley ====
- Yang Yutong as Bai Hehuai (白鹤淮), the Miracle Physician, Su Zhe's daughter, skilled in medicine and proficient in using silver needles to both heal and harm.
- Dong Chunhui as Xin Baicao (辛百草), the Medicine King
- Zhao Yating as Xiao Chaoyan (萧朝颜), who grew up with Su Muyu in No-Sword City and later becomes the disciple of Bai Hehuai

==== Tianqi City ====
===== Shadow Sect =====
Rules Blood River and the three families from the dark

- Lu Xingyu as Yi Bu (易卜), the leader of the Shadow Sect and the Imperial Father-in-law
- Liu Yilong as Wu Ya (乌鸦), the leader of Hawkeye (the First Guardian Division of the Shadow Sect)
- Wang Sen as Luo Tianxiang (洛天翔), the Left Shadow Guard Commander

===== Others =====
- Liu Pizhong as Su Ziyan (苏子言)
- Min Zheng as Xie Biyou (谢辟又), grandfather of Xie Zaiye
- Min Xinghan as Xie Zaiye (谢在野), grandson of Xie Biyou
- Yan Jie as Mu Fusheng (慕浮生)
- Wang Yifan as Xu Liuyun (许流云), Blade Ghost of Nanjue
- Zhang Yingbing as Night Crow (夜鸦), the Ghost Physician who was expelled from Medicine King Valley and serves as the First Prince's subordinate, skilled in the drugged puppet art

===== Imperial Palace =====
- Fan Jinwei as Xiao Ruojin (萧若瑾), Emperor Mingde, the elder brother of Xiao Ruofeng
- Bai Shu as Xiao Ruofeng (萧若风), the Prince of Langya and senior of Baili Dongjun, founded the Four Guardians of Tianqi City and the Inner Security division
- Dai Luwa as Situ Xue (司徒雪), the Princess Consort of Langya
- Xiao Qiwen as Xiao Chong (萧崇), the Second Prince who is blind since childhood, Yan Zhantian and Jin Yu's disciple
- Zhao Huanran as Xiao Yong (萧永), the First Prince, Zhuo Qing's disciple and Dian Ye's nephew
- Leon Lee as Dian Ye (典叶), the Flying Tiger General and Xiao Yong's uncle
- Yan Su as Zhuo Qing (浊清), the former Grand Eunuch and Xiao Yong's master

===== The Four Guardians of Tianqi City =====
Led by the Prince of Langya

- Li Ruojia as Li Xinyue (李心月), the Azure Dragon Guardian, associated with Jianxin Tomb, a successor of Jianxin, and the mother of Li Hanyi
- Liu Xiu as Ji Ruofeng (姬若风), the White Tiger Guardian; affiliated with Baixiao Hall.
- Xia Zhiguang as Sikong Changfeng (司空长风), the Vermilion Bird Guardian, the Third City Lord of Xueyue City and the Spear Deity.
- Zhang Shian as Tang Lianyu (唐怜月), the Xuanwu Guardian; from the Tang Clan

==== No-Sword City (eradicated) ====
- Jiang Zhenhao as Zhuo Yuluo (卓雨洛), City Lord of No-Sword City and the father of Su Muyu

==== Wushuang City ====
- Zhang Rui as Song Yanhui (宋燕回), City Lord of Wushuang City, Liu Yunqi's disciple
- Zhang Gong as Liu Yunqi (刘云起), the former City Lord of Wushuang City and the master of Song Yanhui
- Yan Kuan as Jian Wudi (剑无敌), the head of the Lunwu Hall and senior of Song Yanhui
- Guo Jun as Jian Shanyue (剑山岳), the elder of the Lunwu Hall, skilled in wielding the ancient sword Qingming
- Wang Tingxu as Lu Yuzhai (卢玉翟), the eldest disciple of Song Yanhuí
- Shao Weitong as Luo Ge (罗各), one of Lunwu Hall's Four Seekers of the Swords Art
- Chen Minghao as Xiu ru (修儒), one of Lunwu Hall's Four Seekers of the Swords Art
- Li Ningyuan as Jia Zhou (贾昼), one of Lunwu Hall's Four Seekers of the Swords Art
- Cui Yongxuan as Ye Wuxiu (叶无袖), one of Lunwu Hall's Four Seekers of the Swords Art

==== Xueyue City ====
- Zhang Weina as Li Hanyi (李寒衣), the Second City Lord of Xueyue City, the daughter of Li Xinyue, and the creator of Floral Sword Art, known as the Sword Deity Xueyue
- Xia Zhiguang as Sikong Changfeng (司空长风), the Third City Lord of Xueyue City, known as the Spear Deity

==== The Five Sword Deities ====
- Guo Jianan as Xie Xuan (谢宣), the Scholarly Sword Deity
- Zhang Weina as Li Hanyi (李寒衣), the Sword Deity Xueyue from Xueyue City
- Zhang Haocheng as Yan Zhantian (颜战天), the Furious Sword Deity, wields the famed blade Breaker of Armies, Xiao Chong's master
- Cao Yuchen as Zhao Yuzhen (赵玉真), the Profound Sword Deity from Wangchengshan Sect
- Luo Qingyang (洛青阳), the Lone Sword Deity from Muliang City

==== The Tang Clan ====
- Yang Zihua as Grand Master Tang (唐老太爷)
- Zhang Shian as Tang Lianyue (唐怜月), one of the Four Guardians of Tianqi City - the Black Tortoise
- Chen Guanying as Tang Linghuang (唐灵皇), the second-best poison master in the world and Tang Lianyue's senior. He was turned into a drugged puppet by Night Crow
- Zhang Yang as Tang Lingzun (唐灵尊)
- Liang Jiatong as Tang Lian (唐莲), the disciple of Tang Lianyue
- Hu Jian as Tang Fulu (唐福禄), an elder of the inner-hall, serves under Tang Lingzun
- Wang Xiaowei as Tang Tianlu (唐天禄), an elder of the inner-hall, serves under Tang Lingzun

== Original soundtrack ==
No.	Title	Lyrics	Music	Singer	Length
1.	"河 (River)" (Theme song)	Wang Yaoguang, Zhang Pengpeng	Wang Yaoguang	Zhou Shen	3:27
2.	"不忘 (Never Forget)"	Zhang Ying	Luo Kun	Liu Yuning	3:43
3.	"潭中月" (Su Muyu theme song)	Hu Xiao-ou	Zhou Jieyin	Lars Huang	1:33
4.	"幸逢你 (Fortunate to Have Met You)"	Hu Xiao-ou	Zhou Jieyin	Xiaojun	4:42
5.	"暮雪-虐情版 (Evening Snow)"	BYE	Gu Ruyuan	Liu Yu	4:22
6.	"暮雪-柔情版 (Evening Snow)"	BYE	Gu Ruyuan	Yang Yuqing	4:22
7.	"汇 (Convergence)"	Xilin Zixiu	Xilin Zixiu	Zhang Hang	4:47

== Production ==
- On June 13, 2024, the cast was officially announced. The booting ceremony was held on the same day.
- In August 2024, a reporter from CCTV visited the Hengdian drama set and interviewed lead actor Gong Jun and director Yin Tao about the latest updates on the new drama.
- A wrap-up special was released on November 30, 2024.

== International broadcast ==
- Taiwan - Netflix (From October 20, 2025), MOD and Hami Video (from December 1, 2025)
- Hong Kong - Viu (From October 21, 2025)
- Singapore - Viu (From October 27, 2025)
- Thailand - TrueVisions Now (From October 27, 2025)
- Vietnam - VieON, FPT Play, TV360 (From October 27, 2025)
- United States - Rakuten Viki (From October 27, 2025)
- Europe - Rakuten Viki (From October 27, 2025)
- Korea - CHANNEL CHINA (From May 27, 2026)
- Japan - HOME DRAMA CHANNEL (From July 1, 2026)
