= Hold a Court Now =

2023 Chinese television series

- Chinese: 家事法庭
- Hanyu Pinyin: jiā shì fǎ tíng
- Genre: Legal; Crime; Police procedural Action
- Written by: Zhang Qimin
- Directed by: Xie Dongshen
- Starring: Gong Jun; Ren Min
- Country of origin: China
- Original language: Mandarin
- No. of episodes: 26

Production
- Producers: Liu Mingli, Ji Jie, Long Hongtao
- Production locations: Wuxi, China
- Running time: 45 minutes
- Production companies: China Media Group, The Supreme People's Court Film and Television Center, Tencent Video, Qiyinxiang Yingshi

Original release
- Network: CCTV-1, Tencent Video
- Release: 25 March – 8 April 2026

Hold a Court Now (Chinese: 家事法庭; pinyin: jiā shì fǎ tíng) is a 2026 Chinese legal drama television series co-produced by China Media Group, The Supreme People's Court Film and Television Center, Tencent Video and Qiyinxiang Yingshi, starring Gong Jun and Ren Min in the leading roles. The series premiered on March 25, 2026, airing on China Central Television (CCTV-1) in prime time and streaming on Tencent Video and iQIYI.

== Synopsis ==
The drama centers on a family court and explores a wide range of domestic disputes through individual cases. Using a warm and realistic narrative style, the series portrays the human side of the judicial system and highlights the emotional complexities behind legal proceedings.

The story follows several grassroots legal professionals, including young judge Shen Xiezhi, lawyer Qin Rui, deputy chief judge Shu Jing, and judge Yu Le. Together, they handle diverse family-related cases, revealing both the legal challenges and personal struggles faced by those working in family law.

== Cast ==
=== Main ===
- Gong Jun as Shen Xiezhi
- Ren Min as Qin Rui

=== Supporting ===
- Huang Lu as Shu Jing
- Gao Xin as Lian Yongjiu
- Han Yunyun as Yu Le
- Zhang Fan as Ying Danian
- Zhang Cheng as Chen Xianghui
- Yuan Qing'er as Liu Lian
- Zhou Yangyang as Hu Aixi
- Wang Gongliang as Jiang Feng
- Bao Bei'er as Mr. Zhou

== Production ==
The series consists of 26 episodes and focuses on realistic storytelling grounded in everyday life. It emphasizes both courtroom proceedings and the personal lives of legal professionals, aiming to depict the judicial system as compassionate rather than purely procedural.

- On December 7, 2023, the cast was officially announced, and the booting ceremony was held on the same day.
- The wrap-up ceremony was held on March 20, 2024.
- On January 9, 2026, the series was selected for CCTV's "2026 Recommended Dramas on CMG" lineup.

== Thematic Reception ==
Early commentary highlighted the show's focus on socially relevant topics such as marriage disputes, custody battles, elder care, inheritance disputes, and domestic violence, noting its alignment with contemporary public concerns.
