= Chang Huasen =

Chinese actor and singer (born 1997)

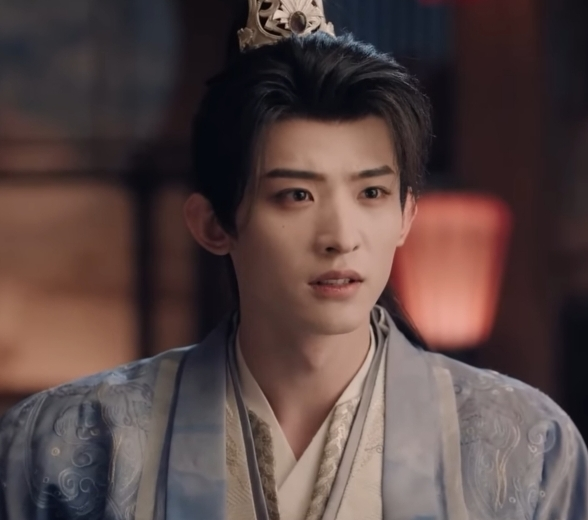
- Chang for the drama Sword and Beloved
- Born: September 6, 1997 (age 29); Zibo, China
- Other name: Waston
- Education: Hangzhou Dianzi University
- Occupations: Actor; singer
- Years active: 2020–present
- Agent: Haohan Entertainment
- Height: 185 cm (6 ft 1 in)

Chinese name
- Simplified Chinese: 常华森
- Hanyu Pinyin: Cháng Huásēn

Chang Huasen (Chinese: 常华森; pinyin: Cháng Huásēn, born September 6, 1997) is a Chinese actor and singer. He is best known for his roles in A Journey to Love (2023), Moonlight Mystique (2025) and Blood River (2025). He is also known for participating in iQIYI's reality survival show Youth With You 3.

== Early life and education ==
Chang was born September 6, 1997, in Zibo, Shandong, China. He graduated from Hangzhou Dianzi University.

== Discography ==
=== Singles ===
Year	Title	Album
2021	"The Little Prince" (小王子)	Non-single album

== Filmography ==
=== Television series ===
Year	Title	Role	Notes	Ref.
2020	Parallel Love	Ding Ding		
2020	Lovely Us	Zhi Risheng		
2021	Make My Heart Smile	Yan Jiuyue		
2023	A Journey to Love	Li Tongguang		
2024	Above the Rivers	Gu Yu		
2024	Are You the One	Liu Yu / Ziyu		
2024	Dawn Amidst Hidden Clouds	Lou Mingye		
2024	Our Days	Wang Yuxi		
2025	Moonlight Mystique	Chong Shao / Yin Zun Mo Li		
2025	Whispers of Fate	Wanyu Yuedan		
2025	Blood River	Su Changhe		
2025	Sword and Beloved	Fan Yunfei		
2026	Veil of Shadows	Han Ba / Yan Bi		
2026	The Vanishing Beauty	Jiao Xu		
TBA	The Last Bloom Fades	Zuo Wensi		
TBA	Eternal Faith	Shi Qingxuan		
TBA	Liao Zhai	Xia Feixue		
TBA	The Melody of Love	Qian Xiao	Guest appearance	
TBA	A Duet in Blue	Liang Siyuan		

=== Television shows ===
Year	Title	Role	Notes	Ref.
2021	Youth With You 3	Contestant	Finished at 10th	

== Awards and nominations ==
Year	Award	Category	Nominee(s)/Work(s)	Result	Ref.
2024	Tencent Video Star Awards	Best Newcomer in a Television Series	Chang Huasen	Won	
2024	Weibo TV & Internet Video Summit	Potential Actor of the Year	Chang Huasen	Won	
2024	Wenrong Awards	Top 10 Young Actor	Chang Huasen	Won	
2025	iQIYI Scream Night	Top 10 Actor of the Year	Chang Huasen	Won	
