= The Flaming Heart =

- Chinese: 你好, 火焰蓝
- Genre: Action, Romance, Drama, Medical
- Written by: Hou Shi Qi, Wu Wei, Ding Rui, Chen Che
- Directed by: Zhang Li Chuan
- Starring: Gong Jun; Zhang Huiwen
- Opening theme: "Buring Medals" by Pang Hanchen, Zhou Yanchen, Lu Yupeng, Wang Yizhou, Gong Jun and Zhang Huiwen
- Ending theme: "Through" by A-Lin
- Country of origin: China
- Original language: Mandarin
- No. of seasons: 1
- No. of episodes: 24 episodes

Production
- Producers: Su Ming, Han Pei Jun
- Production locations: Nanjing, Jiangsu Province
- Running time: 40 minutes per episode
- Production companies: Youku, NICE.film

Original release
- Network: Youku
- Release: 8 July – 16 August 2021

The Flaming Heart (Chinese: 你好, 火焰蓝), is a 2021 Chinese rescue emotional drama streaming television series co-produced by Youku, and NICE.film, directed by Zhang Li Chuan, written by Hou Shi Qi, Wu Wei, Ding Rui, and Chen Che. It starred Gong Jun (Chinese: 龚俊) and Zhang Huiwen (Chinese: 张慧雯) as the main leads. The series aired on Youku from July 8 to August 16 with 24 episodes.

== Synopsis ==
Huo Yan, (played by Gong Jun), is introverted and responsible firefighter; (Zhang Huiwen) played an emergency doctor, Yan Lan, who is warm, delicate and has excellent professional ability. Two special professional attributes also add different colors to the love between the two. They joined hands to rescue, and cooperated to save the injured. Huo Yan and Yan Lan's love model of mutual trust, mutual respect and common growth under the setting of special occupations.

== Cast ==
- Gong Jun as Huo Yan
- Zhang Huiwen as Yan Lan
- Zhou Yan Chen as Wang Dayin
- Wang Zi Wei as Jiang Tong
- Pang Han Chen as Luo Jie
- Zhou Lin Jia as Liu Xuan
- Luo Yi as Bai Xiaolin
- Lu Yu Peng as Ma Qianli
- Wang Yi Zhou as Li Yanliang
- Zhang Zhi Lu as Ji Yuan
- Yao Qing Ren as Chen Pingeng
- Zhao Hui Nan as Wu Zheng
- Liu Chao as Han Pei

== Soundtrack ==
The Flaming Heart OST (你好, 火焰蓝 音乐原声大碟) consisted of 10 songs, singing by various artists.

No.	English title	Chinese title	Artist	Notes
1.	Burning Medals	滚烫勋章	Pang Hanchen, Zhou Yanchen, Lu Yupeng, Wang Yizhou, Gong Jun, Zhang Huiwen	Opening theme song
2.	Through	穿過	A-Lin	Ending theme song
3.	Into The Play	入戏	Wang Jiacheng	
4.	Sweet		Gong Jun	
5.	You Came to My World	你來到我的世界	Liu Xijun	
6.	About You	有关你	Ayanga	
7.	Dear Moon	亲爱的月亮	Chen Chusheng	
8.	Care About You		Duan Aojuan	
9.	Charity	施舍	Aska Yang	
10.	Right Taste	对味	BY2	

== Production ==
In November 2020, the main leads along with the production team were announced. The boosting ceremony was held on the same day. The series was filmed from November 8 to February 5, 2021 at Nanjing, Jiangsu Province.

== Awards and nominations ==
Year	Award	Category	Nominee	Result	Ref.
2021	Weibo TV Series Awards	Most Popular Television Series	The Flaming Heart	3rd	
2021	Weibo TV Series Awards	Most Popular Actor	Gong Jun	Won	
2021	WeTV Awards	Favorite Actor	Gong Jun	Nominated	

== International Broadcast ==
Network	Country	Notes/Ref.
PFT Play	Vietnam	
VieON	Vietnam	
HTV7	Vietnam	
Line TV	Taiwan	
LiTV	Taiwan	
MyVideo	Taiwan	
TrueID	Thailand	
YouTube	International	
Viki	International	
ODC	International	
