= Blade of Vengeance (Chinese TV series) =

- Chinese: 白衣公卿
- Hanyu Pinyin: Bái yī gōng qīng
- Genre: Wuxia; Historical
- Based on: Jin Yi Xing 《锦衣行》 by Fu Lan
- Written by: Bian Zhihong; Sun Yuwen
- Directed by: Lin Shuijing; Li Cai
- Starring: Gong Jun
- Country of origin: China
- Original language: Mandarin
- No. of episodes: 32

Production
- Production location: Hengdian World Studios
- Running time: 45 minutes
- Production companies: Xixi Pictures; Tencent Video

Original release
- Network: CCTV; Tencent Video; WeTV

Blade of Vengeance (Chinese: 白衣公卿; pinyin: bái yī gōng qīng) is an upcoming Chinese wuxia television series adapted from the wuxia novel Jin Yi Xing by Fu Lan that tells the inspirational story of a young man with extraordinary skills and lofty aspirations, from his studies to his eventual success. It stars Gong Jun and directed by Lin Shuijing and Li Cai. The booting ceremony was held on September 19, 2025. The series wrapped up filming on December 27, 2025.

== Synopsis ==
At the dawn of a new dynasty, the imperial court appears calm, yet danger churns beneath the surface. When Ye Zhao’s family is slaughtered overnight, he alone survives. Determined to uncover the truth and avenge his loved ones, he abandons his name, assumes the identity of Meng Jianqing (played by Gong Jun), and infiltrates the Embroidered Uniform Guard—the blade of imperial power. Caught between court conspiracies and the ruthless forces of the martial world, Ye Zhao fights through blood and betrayal, forging himself into a blade sharp enough to cleave the darkness and meet the coming dawn.

== Cast ==
- Gong Jun as Meng Jianqing / Ye Zhao
- Wang Yuwen as Yun Yanjiao / Ah Qiao
- Nie Yuan as Shen Guangli
- Yu Chengen as Guo Ying
- Wu Junting as Gongsun Yi
- Chen Siyi as Guo Yun
- Zhou Jieqiong as Mei Hong
- Hai Yitian as Qi Gang
- Gao Shuguang as Chen Yi
- Yu Bo as Wan Decheng
- Liu Huan as Emperor
- Zhao Qianzi as Granny Qi
- Liu Haikuan as Yun Yanran
- Luo Shiqi as Huai An

== Production ==
- In 2024, Xixi Pictures presented Blade of Vengeance at 28th Hong Kong International Film & TV Market (FILMART) on March 11-14 and 29th Shanghai Television Festival (STVF) Market on June 24-28.
- On September 19, 2025, the cast was officially announced. The booting ceremony was held on the same day.
- On October 30, 2025, Xixi Pictures presented Blade of Vengeance at Asia’s leading multi-entertainment content market (TIFFCOM) during the Tokyo International Film Festival. Set during the Yongle Era, Xixi said that Blade of Vengeance would break from the norm and the in-world drama would focus on realism and logic rather than fantastical feats, with the production emphasizing the real location shooting and hard-hitting action.
- The series wrapped up filming on December 27, 2025.
- On January 9, 2026, the series was selected for CCTV's "2026 Recommended Dramas on CMG" lineup.
