= Zhou Yutong =

Chinese actress (born 1994)

- Zhou in Fall in Love with a Scientist (2021)
- Born: September 21, 1994 (age 32); Huainan, Anhui, China
- Education: Shanghai Institute of Visual Art
- Occupation: Actress
- Years active: 2013–present
- Agent: Easy Entertainment
- Notable work: 2017- "Cambrian Period" 2021-"Remembrance of things past" 2024-"Will love in spring"
- Height: 1.67 m (5 ft 6 in)

Chinese name
- Chinese: 周雨彤
Transcriptions
Standard Mandarin
- Hanyu Pinyin: Zhōu Yǔtóng

Zhou Yutong (Chinese: 周雨彤; pinyin: Zhōu Yǔtóng, born September 21, 1994) is a Chinese actress and model and a 2012 graduate of the Acting Department at the Shanghai Institute of Visual Arts, where she majored in performance and developed skills in dance and yoga.

== Biography ==
Xiao zhou grew up in a single-parent family following her parents' divorce when she was four years old, after which she was raised primarily by her mother. She has an elder sister.

In 2013, Zhou made her acting debut in the children's fantasy film Balala the Fairies: the Movie.

In 2015, Zhou gained recognition for her role as a cold assassin in the fantasy romance drama Love Weaves Through a Millennium. The same year, she made her big screen debut in the youth film comedy 20 Once Again as a rock musician. In 2016, Zhou had her first leading role in the fantasy web drama The Journey.

In 2017, Zhou gained increased recognition with her role as a top actress in the fantasy action web drama Cambrian Period. The same year she starred in the fantasy romance drama Long For You, adapted from the comic "The Distance of Light Between You and Me".

In 2018, Zhou played a mermaid in the fantasy romance web series My Love From the Ocean.

In 2019, Zhou starred in the youth action drama Young Blood.

In 2024, Yutong starred as a disabled woman in a modern romantic "Will love in spring" drama, adapted from original work called "Lover" by She mu si.

She also starred in a drama called "In between" mainly focused on modern dating & relationships.

Zhou yutong played a role in theme short film "A Thank You Letter from Film" for 2025 Beijing international film festival.

Zhou Yutong is the brand ambassador for Belle and the cultural tourism ambassador for Huainan.

CALZEDONIA's brand ambassador for China revealed on 29 October 2025 is Zhou Yutong.

Zhou yutong attended t-style forum welcome night & the eighth annual international style conference - t-style forum.

Zhou yutong & Tan Songyun performance of (Girls, girls!) from the movie "Girl on edge" for 120th anniversary of Chinese film night.

"For Peace" song performance by Bai Yu, Zhou Yutong, and Zhu Yawen recreated the scene of "Returning the Land to the Song Dynasty" & their voices filled with the people's longing for peace and tranquility for 2026 China internet audio visual awards.

Chen Zhuoxuan and Yutong sang "Igniting the Light of Life" together, primarily dedicated to youth morale.

Zhou Yutong and scholar Jiao Xiongping served as award presenters at the Sea Wave Film Week Honor Ceremony

== Controversies ==
Yutong faced heavy cyberbullying about her university education (later, clarified by her teacher on weibo) and about her actions and words in a reality show called Divas Hit the Road S6, and due to this she lost so many followers on her public platforms and lost many offers. On 4 November, she made an official public apology, saying, in part, that "During this period, some of my performances have aroused anger or sadness in many people. I want to apologize to these friends: no matter what, as long as I caused this bad feeling, I want to sincerely say 'I'm sorry'."

She has taken legal action against the people who tried to spread false information on her for 3 times & she won every single time.

== Filmography ==
=== Film ===
Year	English title	Chinese title	Role	Notes/Ref.
2013	Balala the Fairies: the Movie	巴啦啦小魔仙大电影	Qiu Yu	
2015	20 Once Again	重返20岁	Xiao Mei	
2016	One Night Only	天亮之前	Sue	
2022	Stay With Me	我是真的讨厌异地恋	Qiao Qiao	
2024	Big World	小小的我	Ya Ya	
2026	Every dog has its day	马腾你别走!		Cameo
NA	Her escape plan	她的逃跑计划	Li zhi yan	
NA	Pearl pearl	珍珠珍珠	Yue Yue	Pearl pearl

=== Television series ===
Year	English title	Chinese title	Role	Network	Notes/Ref
2015	Love Weaves Through a Millennium	相爱穿梭千年	Ying Yue	Hunan TV	
2015	Seventeen Blue	会痛的17岁	Ah Jiu	Youku	
2016	Addicted	上瘾	Shi Hui	iQiyi	Cameo
2017	The Journey	寻找前世之旅	Ye Yin / Yi Sha	iQiyi	
2017	Long For You	我与你的光年距离	Li Xueji	LeTV	
2017	Cambrian Period	寒武纪	Tang Yin	Youku	
2018	My Love from the Ocean	来自海洋的你	Dai Xi	Tencent	
2019	Young Blood	大宋少年志	Zhao Jian	Hunan TV	
2020	Begin Again	我们从结婚开始恋爱	Lu Fangning	Hunan TV	
2021	Silent Evidence	法医秦明之无声的证词	Lin Dang	Mango TV	
2021	The Coolest World	最酷的世界	Teng Xiaoxiao	Youku	
2021	Remembrance of Things Past	我在他乡挺好的	Qiao Xichen	Hunan TV, Mango TV	
2021	Fall in Love with a Scientist	当爱情遇上科学家	Bai Ling Ling	iQiyi	
2023	Nothing But You	爱情而已	Liang You An	iQiyi	
2023	Young Blood Season 2	大宋少年志2	Zhao Jian	Hunan TV	
2023	The heart		Jiang Yi Ning	We TV	Support role
2024	Will love in spring	家乡有一位爱人	Zhuang jie	Tencent	Main lead
2024	In between	半成熟的男人和女人	Han Su	Linmon pictures, Youku	Support role
2024	You are my lover friend	舍不得离开星星	High school classmate	We TV	Guest role
2025	Me & my family	180天重启诚意	Gu Yun Su, (young) wu limei	Hunan TV/ Mango TV channel	Main role
2026	Swords into plowshares	太平年	Sun Taizhen	iQiyi, Mango TV, We TV	
NA	Spying	谍报上不封顶	Lan You Yin	Youku	Main lead
NA	Simple life	简单的人生	Young woman	Mango TV	Special appearance

=== Television shows ===
Year	English title	Chinese title	Role	Original Network	Ref/ Notes
2025	My little one season 4		Guest (ep-19) - video call	Mango TV	
2024	Divas hit the road S6	花儿与少年 第六季	Regular member	Mango TV	
2024	Hello Saturday	你好幸运	Guest ep-39	Mango TV	
2023	Young blood detectives		Regular member	Mango TV	
2023	Young blood S2: Team bonding		Regular member	Mango TV	
2022	Workplace newcomers: Forensic Season		Regular member	Mango TV	Exam support team
2022	Newcomers at work		Regular member	Mango TV	
2022	Hello Saturday, 2022		Guest ep-43	Mango TV	
2021	Action		Regular member	iQiyi	
2021	Glad to know you S2		Guest	Douyin	
2021	Mao xue woof		Guest ep-41	Tencent	
2019	Lipstick Prince Season 2	口红王子第二季	Ep-5 (Finale)	Tencent	
2019	Youth Periplous	青春环游记	Guest ep-3	Zhejiang Satellite TV	

== Awards and nominations ==
Year	Award	Category	Nominated work	Results	Ref.
2017	2017 Sichuan Pepper Night	Newcomer Actress of the Year Award		Won	
2019	Sina Fashion Awards	Fashion Artist of the Year	—N/a	Won	
2019	iFeng Fashion Choice Awards	Fashion Figure of the Year	—N/a	Won	
2019	WenRong TV Award	Best actress	Young blood S1	Nominated	
2020	2020 Sohu Fashion Awards	Female celebrities with the most fashion influence of the year		Nominated	
2021	32nd Huading Awards	Best Actress in Chinese Contemporary TV Series	Remembrace of Things Past	Won	
2021	Jury Award	Outstanding actor of the year, Outstanding TV Series	Remembrance of things past	Won	Shared with other cast
2021	IFeng Award	Best actress in a television series	Remembrance of things past	Nominated	
2022	2022 Phoenix Fashion Awards	Fashion artist of the year	—N/a	Won	
2023	Zhi Hu Award	Actor of the year	Young blood S2, Nothing but you	Won	
2024	National TV drama awards	Tribute to the actors with outstanding performance in Chinese TV dramas	In between	Won	
2025	13th China college student TV festival	College student's favourite screen image of the year	Will love in spring	Won	
2025	Weibo movie night 2025	Quality actor of the year award	Big world, Will love in spring	Won	
2025	WEIBO TV & INTERNET VIDEO SUMMIT 2025	【Film and TV roles】	Me & my family	Nominated	
2026	Weibo night 2025	Weibo annual charming actress	Me & my family	Won	
2026	2026 Weibo Movie Night	Outstanding actress of the year	Swords into plowshares, Me and my family, big world	Won	
2026	6th New Era International TV Festival		Swords into plowshares	Nominated	

== Philanthropy and Public Engagement ==
Charity activities

In July 2017, Zhou Yutong conducted a live broadcast to promote the adoption of a stray dog named Congcong, encouraging fans to provide it a responsible home and offering to draw a portrait upon successful adoption. She also participated in additional live streams that year advocating "adopt instead of buying" for animals and the "Draw the Lifeline" initiative focused on animal welfare.

In July 2021, donated 300,000 yuan to aid in the Henan flood relief efforts.

In April 2022, Zhou donated 防疫物资, including supplies for isolation points, to her hometown of Huainan, Anhui Province, amid the local COVID-19 outbreak, with the shipment bearing her name in support of community efforts.

In May 2023, she served as an advocate for the "Ai Jia Can" rural child nutrition program under the China Rural Development Foundation's 520 China Student Nutrition Day, joining other celebrities to promote meal supplements for undernourished children in underdeveloped areas.

In August 2023, following Typhoon Doksuri, she contributed rice and oil packages along with humanitarian rescue emergency kits via the same foundation to aid flood victims in Beijing, Tianjin, and Hebei provinces.

In October 2023, she served as a World Wildlife Fund Star Volunteer on International Panda Day, caring for endangered wildlife species and paying attention to global biodiversity conservation.

In December 2023, Zhou donated relief supplies to victims of the Gansu earthquake through established channels.

She donated jointly with other celebs for hainan typhoon disaster

Along with other 38 celebs, she contributed to tibet

In November 2025, Zhou donated 200,000 rmb to support emergency relief and reconstruction efforts with respect to tai po fire in Hong Kong.

Yunnan Golden Monkey Conservation Ambassador 周雨彤 on Weibo for charity work !
