= Rising With the Wind =

- Chinese: 我要逆风去
- Genre: Contemporary urban workplace romance
- Based on: "Wo yao ni feng qu" by Wei Zai
- Directed by: Zhao Yilong
- Starring: Gong Jun; Zhong Chuxi; Wu Xuanyi; Gao Zhiting
- Country of origin: China
- Original language: Mandarin
- No. of seasons: 1
- No. of episodes: 40

Production
- Producers: Dai Ying, Wang Yixu, Zhang Yucheng
- Production location: China
- Running time: 45 minutes per episode
- Production companies: Stellar Media, iQIYI

Original release
- Network: iQIYI, Dragon TV
- Release: 30 October – 20 November 2023

Rising With the Wind (Chinese: 我要逆风去）is a 2023 Chinese television series co-produced by Stellar Media and iQIYI, directed by Zhao Yi Long, adapted from the novel of the same name by Wei Zai. It starred Gong Jun and Zhong Chuxi in the leading roles. The series premiered on Dragon TV and iQIYI simultaneously on October 30, 2023.

== Synopsis ==
Xu Si is an investment professional from Hong Kong who moves back to China. He meets Jiang Hu who is the only daughter of the chairman of a national clothing conglomerate. When Jiang Hu's father's company suddenly goes bankrupt, she is forced to confront challenges from Xu Si. They are at odds with each other as Xu Si keep challenging her marketing approach. They need to deal with financial concerns of graduate entrepreneurs while trying to keep the enterprise from falling apart.

== Cast ==
- Gong Jun as Xu Si
- Zhong Chuxi as Jiang Hu
- Wu Xuanyi as Xiang Zhaoyang
- Gao Zhiting as Yang Jian
- Wei Zheming as Gao Yi
- Chang Chen-kuang as Pei Zhiyuan
- Wen Zhengrong as Yue Shan
- Liu Peiqi as Ye Guoming
- Wang Ji as Fang Moping
- Gao Shuguang as Jiang Qisheng

== Original soundtrack ==
No.	Title	Lyrics	Music	Singer	Length
1.	"造浪 (Make Waves)" (Theme song)	Chen Tian	Hu Qin	Song Yuqi	3:09
2.	"所有美好为你慕名而来 (All Good Things Come for You"	Liu Ziyi	Chen Haotian	Shen Yicheng	3:33
3.	"给月亮的三行诗 (Three Poem Lines for the Moon)"	Huang Yi	Chen Haotian	A-Lin	3:33
4.	"我曾陪你追过风 (Once Accompanied You to Chase Wind)"	Tang Simiao	Jin Le	Wu Xuanyi	4:36
5.	"伴 (Stay With Me)"	Le Yifan	Le Yifan	Ju Jingyi, Zhang Xincheng	2:53
6.	"逆风而上 (Rising Against the Wind)"	Tianfu Shibian	Tianfu Shibian	Tianfu Shibian	2:51
7.	"这份爱 (This Love)"	Chen Tian	Gao Jiaxin	Gong Jun	3:49
8.	"柔软的刺 (Soft Thorn)"	Tang Simiao	Li Ran Yu Hua	Zhong Chuxi	4:00
