= Hu Yixuan (actress) =

Chinese actress (born 1995)

- Born: Hu Yixuan; January 31, 1995 (age 31); Zhaotong, Yunnan, China
- Education: Xijing College
- Occupations: Actress; model
- Years active: 2017–present

Chinese name
- Simplified Chinese: 胡意旋
- Hanyu Pinyin: Hú Yìxuán

Hu Yixuan (Chinese: 胡意旋, born January 31, 1995), is a Chinese actress and model. She gained widespread recognition for her leading roles in the dramas Unforgettable Love (2021) and A River Runs Through It (2021). She is also known for her roles in the dramas The Blue Whisper (2022), and How Dare You!? (2026).

== Discography ==
=== Soundtrack appearances ===
| Year | Title | Album |
|---|---|---|
| 2021 | "Sunny Date" (晴天约会) | Unforgettable Love OST |
| 2021 | "Do You Know That I'm Waiting For You (你知道我在等你吗)" | A River Runs Through It OST |

== Filmography ==
=== Television series ===
| Year | Title | Role | Notes | Ref. |
|---|---|---|---|---|
| 2017 | I Cannot Hug You | Xiao Can | | |
| 2018 | Summer's Desire | Bai Yin | | |
| 2018 | I'm a Pet at Dali Temple | Ru Xiaolan | | |
| 2019 | Macau Family | Song Xiaowen | | |
| 2019 | The Mysterious World | Wan Yunling | | |
| 2020 | The Sweet Girl | Maid at Cloud Workshop | | |
| 2020 | My Dear Destiny | Mi Qiqi / Chou Qingli | | |
| 2020 | The Sleepless Princess | Xu Chuyue | | |
| 2021 | Unforgettable Love | Qin Yiyue | | |
| 2021 | A River Runs Through It | Xia Xiaoju | | |
| 2022 | The Blue Whisper | Luo Jinsang | | |
| 2023 | Faithful | Lin Rulan | | |
| 2024 | Sword and Fairy 1 | A Nu | | |
| 2024 | Once Again | Luo Yuting | | |
| 2025 | Love Never Fails | Hong Ning | | |
| 2025 | The Glory | A Lan | Guest appearance | |
| 2026 | How Dare You!? | Xie Yonger | | |
| 2026 | Hidden Shadow | Lou Mingyue | | |
| TBA | Mr. Cat in the Villa | Chi Zhi | | |
| TBA | Irreplaceable | Bu Tiana | | |
| TBA | Inverted Fate | Li Huaigu | | |
| TBA | The Doll Game | Zhu Shu | | |

== Awards and nominations ==
| Year | Award | Category | Nominee(s)/Work(s) | Result |
|---|---|---|---|---|
| 2020 | Golden Bud - The Fifth Network Film And Television Festival | New Force of the Year | Hu Yixuan | Won |
