= 361 Degrees =

Chinese supplier of shoes and sports goods

361 Degrees International Limited
- Trade name: 361°
- Native name: 三六一度国际有限公司
- Romanized name: Sānliùyī dù guójì yǒuxiàn gōngsī
- Type: Public
- Traded as: SEHK: 1361 and OTC:TSIOF
- Industry: Sports equipment
- Founded: 2003; 23 years ago
- Headquarters: Xiamen, Fujian, China
- Key people: Ding Wuhao (President and Executive Director)
- Products: Athletic shoes, apparel, sports equipment, accessories
- Website: www.361sport.com www.361europe.com

361 Degrees International Ltd. (Chinese: 三六一度; pinyin: Sānliùyī dù; doing business as 361°) is a Chinese sportswear and athletic lifestyle brand headquartered in Xiamen, Fujian. As of the 2023 fiscal year, 361° reported annual revenue exceeding CN¥8 billion, reinforcing its position as one of China's top sportswear brands.

== History ==
The company was established in 2003. The brand name 361° was launched in January 2004. It denotes the 360 degrees in a circle plus one extra degree, representing professional functionality plus an added degree of innovation and creativity. Since 2009, the brand's slogan has been "One Love". 361 Degrees International Limited was listed on the Hong Kong Stock Exchange on 30 June 2009.

361° was the official sporting wear of the Chinese men's and women's Olympic curling teams during the 2010 Vancouver Olympics.

On 22 October 2014, 361° became the provider of the official uniforms for staff and volunteers at the 2016 Summer Olympics and the 2016 Summer Paralympics in Rio de Janeiro.

They were the official sports apparel partner of the 2022 Asian Games.

They had 7,950 authorized retail outlets across the world as of 2020. They are owned and managed by 3,031 authorized dealers.

In January 2025, 361° officially expanded its presence to Malaysia by opening its first retail store at AEON Bukit Tinggi, Klang, Selangor.

In response to the November 2025 fire at Wang Fuk Court in Hong Kong, 361° pledged HK$15 million in cash and emergency supplies to support rescue and recovery efforts for the fire victims.

Outside of sports, 361 Degrees has done collaborations with Pepsi, Peppa Pig, SpongeBob SquarePants, Gundam and Saint Seiya.

== Sponsorships ==
Basketball

- (Serbia) Nikola Jokić
- (United States) Aaron Gordon
- (United States) Kentavious Caldwell-Pope

Organizations

- 2016 Summer Olympics
- 2016 Summer Paralympics
- Asian Games
- World Aquatics

=== Former sponsorships ===
Swimming

- (China) Sun Yang
