= Word of Honor (TV series) =

2021 Chinese TV series

- poster
- 山河令
- Genre: Wuxia; Mystery
- Based on: Faraway Wanderers by Priest
- Written by: Xiao Chu
- Directed by: Cheng Zhichao; Ma Huagan; Li Hongyu
- Starring: Zhang Zhehan; Gong Jun; Zhou Ye; Sun Xilun; Ma Wenyuan; Chen Zihan
- Opening theme: "Ask Heaven" (天问) by Liu Yuning
- Ending theme: "Faraway Wanderers" (天涯客) by Zhang Zhehan and Gong Jun
- Country of origin: China
- Original language: Mandarin
- No. of episodes: 36 episodes + 1 special on Youku

Production
- Executive producers: Yang Hanyu; Zhang Yang
- Producers: Dai Wei; Ma Zhongjun; Zhang Bin; Ma Tao; Zhou Zhaozong
- Production location: Hengdian World Studios
- Running time: ≈45 minutes per episode
- Production companies: Ciwen Media; Youku

Original release
- Network: Youku
- Release: 22 February – 5 May 2021

Word of Honor (山河令), previously known as A Tale of the Wanderers (天涯客), is a 2021 Chinese wuxia mystery streaming television series co-produced by Ciwen Media, and Youku, directed by Cheng Zhichao, Ma Huagan, and Li Hongyu, written by Xiao Chu, and adapted from the danmei novel Faraway Wanderers (天涯客) by Priest. It starred Zhang Zhehan (张哲瀚) and Gong Jun (龚俊) in the leading roles. The series aired on Youku from February 22 to May 5 with 36 episodes, plus a short bonus clip shows what happened after the end of the main series.

The series was removed from Chinese online video platforms in August 2021 due to industry boycott against Zhang Zhehan.

== Synopsis ==
Zhou Zishu, former leader of the assassin organization Window of Heaven, exiles himself out of guilt for his past. While wandering the jianghu, he crosses paths with Wen Kexing, the enigmatic master of Ghost Valley who secretly plots revenge for his parents’ deaths and stirs up conflicts in the jianghu. The two become friends, are drawn into power struggles across the jianghu, and into the hunt for a legendary armory key.

== Cast ==
- Zhang Zhehan as Zhou Zishu / Zhou Xu
- Gong Jun as Wen Kexing / Yan Zhen
- Zhou Ye as Gu Xiang
- Sun Xilun as Zhang Chengling
- Ma Wenyuan as Cao Weining
- Chen Zihan as Tragicomic Ghost
- Ke Naiyu as Beauty Ghost
- Xue Fei as Changing Ghost
- Zhou Yao as Lovelace
- Yang Chaoran as Happy Ghost
- Li Bao'er as Corpse-Eating Ghost
- Qiu Bin as Long-Tongued Ghost
- Sun Zihang as Black Grim Reaper
- Sha Zixuan as White Grim Reaper
- Zhang He (voice) as Hanging Ghost
- Ye Xinyu as the former master of Ghost Valley
- Wang Dong as Helian Yi
- Guo Yunfei as Duan Pengju
- Norman Chui as Bi Changfeng
- Wang Rong as Han Ying
- Bryan Leung as Old Zhang
- Jian Zezheng as a Window of Heaven guard
- Li Daikun as the Scorpion King
- Zhao Qian as Evil Bodhisattva
- Yu Naijia as Pretty Arhat
- Liu Yuetao as Qin Song
- Pan Jian as Blonde Monster Jiang
- Heizi as Gao Chong
- Wang Ruolin as Zhao Jing
- Guo Jiahao as Shen Shen
- Chang Jin as Zhang Yusen
- Yang Han as Lu Taichong
- Jin Le as Gao Xiaolian
- Yang Wanli as Deng Kuan
- Yang Zhen as Zhu Yaozhi
- Tang Yuansheng as Gao Shan
- Tang Shuya as Xie Wuyang
- Huang Ziyi as Song Huairen
- Yan Ding Xiangyu as Zhang Chengfeng
- Chen Qi as Zhang Chengluan
- Huang Youming as Ye Baiyi
- Li Mingxuan as Rong Xuan
- Wei Zheming as Jing Beiyuan
- Fan Jinwei as Wu Xi
- Gong Zhengnan as Qin Huaizhang
- Cao Xiyue as Princess Jing'an
- Zhang Shuangli as Long Que
- Wang Zirun as Long Xiao
- Zou Shizhong as the Master of Immortal Physician Valley
- Yu Xinyan as Yue Feng'er
- Ji Xiaofei as Zhen Ruyu
- Ou Ruola as Gu Miaomiao
- Wang Boqing as Mo Huaiyang
- Wang Kang as Mo Weixu
- Cheng Cheng as Fan Huaikong
- Liu Hanyang as Yu Qiufeng
- Jia Yu as Yu Tianjie
- Kong Lingzi as He Ruicai
- Wang Gang as Ao Laizi
- Zhang Chen as Qingbo
- Liu Ruxuan as Qinghua
- Wang Yilong as Qingsong
- Zhao Hongwu as Mu Siyuan
- Yuan Shuai as Mu Yunge
- Wei Jia as the leader of the Beggar Clan
- Kou Zhenhai as Huang He
- Zhou Xiaopeng as Lu Liu
- Ma Lan as Tao Hong
- Yu Zikuan as He Yifan
- Zhang Zhiwei as Du Yuqian
- Lu Chunsheng as Pei Feng
- Tong Xiaomei as Qiao Xing
- Huang Bixing as Feng Xiaofeng
- Wang Gang as Gao Shannu
- Yu Aiqun as Master Cimu
- Zhao Yongzhan as the leader of the Cao Sect
- Ren Xihong as Wang Moxuan
- Han Haoxiang as the second leader of the Jujing Sect
- Xu Wei as the leader of Haisha Sect
- Song Yagang as the leader of the Tiezhang Sect
- Wang Chong as the leader of Wuhu Duanjian Sect
- Li Tongdong as the leader of the Funiu Sect
- Hou Quanlong as Sun Zhong
- Shen Baoping as Uncle Li
- Zhao Qihang as Ping'an
- Wu Kunyi as Aqinlai
- Fu Rou Meiqi as Yunzai
- Ren Yixuan as Honglu
- Li Man as Yan Wan
- Yang Mo as Fang Buzhi
- Wei Yu as Minister Li
- Wang Xingyi as Green Clothed Swordsman
- Yan Yan as Yue Rong
- Yun Xiang as Bi Xingming
- Lu Jin as Abbess Zhiyin
- Wang Haochen as Deng Kuan's son
- Hao Jianchun as Meng Po
- Wu Lin as Guimianke
- Cheng Wanchuan as Luo Hao
- Lu Huan as Uncle Lin
- Wang Pin as Cheng Zichen
- Liu Meixi as Zhang Nianxiang

== Soundtrack ==
The series' soundtrack consists of 13 tracks sung by various artists.

#	English title	Chinese title	Artist	Lyrics	Composer/Arrangement	Notes
1	"Ask Heaven"	天问	Liu Yuning	Zhang Huiquan	Yan Xiaonan, Gong Yifan	opening theme song
2	"Faraway Wanderers"	天涯客	Zhang Zhehan, Gong Jun	Xiao Chu	Jin Ruochen, Mao Zhenyao	ending theme song
3	"Lonely Dream"	孤梦	Zhang Zhehan	Zhang Chang	Zheng Guofeng	Zhou Zishu's theme
4	"Untitled"	无题	Hu Xia	Mei Zhen	Jin Ruochen	
5	"Return"	归	Wang Jiacheng	Wang Yiqing, Lin Qiao	Sun Aili	
6	"Letter Forward"	锦书来	Henry Huo	Ali	Wen Zhe	
7	"Drunken Moon"	醉江月	Zhang Xianzi	Yan Tianyu	Song Chen	
8	"Looking at the Jianghu with a Smile"	笑看江湖	Man Shuke	Yutou Taro	Man Shuke, Yutou Taro	
9	"Blind"	盲	Elvis Wang	Lin Qiao	Deng Qiangzhong, Xia Heng	Wen Kexing's theme
10	"Vanquished Fate"	缘灭	Shuang Sheng	Ma Chengcheng	Zheng Bingbing, Zhang Xi	
11	"Broken Heart"	落心	Ye Li	Ma Chengcheng, Ma Tao	Zhu Xiaosheng Zoki	
12	"Gazing at the Horizon"	望天涯	Li Daikun, Yuan Shuai, Ma Wenyuan, Sun Xilun	Ma Chengcheng	Wang Jiacheng, Yang Zixuan	
13	"Journey of Mountain and River"	山河行	Steve Chou	Lin Qiao, Liu Enxun	Cen Siyuan	

== Production ==
In June 2020, the main leads Zhang Zhehan and Gong Jun were announced along with the production team. On the same day, the filming ceremony was held. On July 18, a fan meeting was held. The series was filmed from June 3 to September 23 at Hengdian World Studios.

== Concert ==
Word of Honor Theme Concert took place on the 3 and 4 of May 2021, in the gymnasium of the Suzhou Olympic Sports Centre. The main leads Zhang Zhehan, Gong Jun, Zhou Ye, Ma Wenyuan, and Sun Xilun attended the show along with supporting cast members Zhao Qian, Huang Youming, Li Daikun, Heizi, Chen Zihan, Jin Le, Ke Naiyu, Wang Ruolin, Guo Jiahao, Fan Jinwei, Guo Yunfei and Wang Rong. Over 600,000 people participated in the tickets purchased, but only 12348 seats available. The tickets sold out within 14 seconds. Online tickets were also available for livestream through media platform Youku, costing CN¥68 (US$10) per day.

== International broadcasts ==
Network	Country	Notes/Ref.
VieON	Vietnam	
HTV7	Vietnam	
Line TV	Taiwan	
LiTV	Taiwan	
friDay	Taiwan	
MyVideo	Taiwan	
Hami Video	Taiwan	
TrueID	Thailand	
Astro TV	Malaysia	
Singtel TV	Singapore	
	Brunei	
	Cambodia	
Chunghwa TV	South Korea	
Wowow TV	Japan	
MX Player	India	
YouTube	International	
Amazon Prime	International	
Viki	International	
Netflix	International	
ODC	International	

== Awards and nominations ==
Year	Award	Category	Nominees	Result	Ref.
2021	China Content Marketing Awards	Best Visual Effects	—N/a	Won	
2021	China Content Marketing Awards	Best Production	—N/a	Won	
2021	China Content Marketing Awards	Most Talked About	—N/a	Won	
2022	Golden Blossom Network Film and Television Assn	Annual Quality Screenwriter	—N/a	Won	
