= Mango TV =

Chinese video streaming platform owned by Hunan Broadcasting System

- Screenshot
- Native name: 芒果TV
- Website type: OTT streaming platform
- Available in: 8 languages
- List of languages: Chinese; English; Thai; Malay; Vietnamese; Indonesian; French; Spanish
- Founded: 26 May 2006; 20 years ago
- Headquarters: Changsha, Hunan, China
- Owner: Hunan Broadcasting System
- CEO: Liang Deping
- Industry: Video on demand
- Products: Streaming media; video on demand; digital distribution
- Parent: Mango Excellent Media
- Website: w.mgtv.com
- Current status: Online

Mango TV (芒果TV, Mángguǒ TV; MGTV) is a Chinese video streaming platform of Mango Excellent Media, affiliated with the Hunan Broadcasting System. Mango TV was established on May 26, 2006, in Changsha, Hunan and later decided to use 'Mango TV (Internet TV, PC, Phone and Pad)' as its video platform branding title in 2008. Mango TV specializes in creating online videos and is an online platform providing all of the content that is presented in TV channels, and all other copyright works from Hunan Broadcasting System and Hunan Satellite TV. Its current headquarters is located in Golden Eagle Movie & TV Cultural City, Changsha, Hunan, China. Mango TV provides audiences with diverse content, including films, TV series, music, cartoons and entertainment. In 2016, the content from Hunan Satellite TV accounted for 38% of all that Mango TV has produced.

== History ==
Mango TV was established on May 26, 2006, in Changsha, Hunan by Ruobo Zhang, the former Mango TV chairman and CEO. On April 20, 2014, the original Mango TV and Golden Eagle website were integrated into a single online video platform which exclusively holds all of Hunan Broadcasting System and Hunan Satellite TV's content and enjoys their copyright works, also known as "Mango Exclusive Broadcast". In October 2014, Mango TV created the first self-produced web series 'Huayang Jianghu'. On 2014 New Year Countdown Night, held by Hunan Satellite TV, Mango TV launched five-screen live broadcast mode, allowing audience to select different camera positions and angles to watch the celebration show.

In 2015, Mango TV shifted its aims from 'Exclusive Broadcast' to 'Unique Content', during which period the number of users has increased to 60 million on the platform. In October 2015, Mango TV signed a memorandum with BBC Worldwide for more opportunities for co-production in the global market.

On June 23, 2016, Mango TV completed series B funding with nearly 1.5 billion. Mango TV planned to go public in 2016. But the plan failed, and Mango TV ended up being included in Happigo Home Shopping Co. Ltd., going public with other six companies. Critics stated that it would be better for Mango TV to obtain fully controlled operating authority. With Hunan Broadcasting System owning more than 50% shares, it is hard for Mango TV to make decisions all by itself.

=== Eurovision 2018 controversy ===
According to English state media, in May 2018 during Ireland's performance in the first semi-final of the Eurovision Song Contest 2018, Mango TV blurred and censored gay love symbols such as a kiss and LGBT flags, and the Albanian performance in the same show was cut out entirely due to a ban on television performers displaying tattoos that took effect in January 2018. In response, the European Broadcasting Union, which organises the event, terminated its partnership with Mango TV, which led to a ban on televising the remaining shows or any future editions of the event.

== Content ==
=== Drama ===
In October 2014, Mango TV's first self-produced network drama, 'Huayang Jianghu,' debuted, which featured the ancient Chinese world as well as costumes and starred young idols. In late 2014, Mango TV produced the second drama, 'Jinpai Hongniang.' The drama featured a fixed cast compared to previous network dramas, which preferred to take each episode with different actors.

=== Network show ===
In 2015, Mango TV produced the first interactive network live show, 'Perfect Holiday,' featuring normal young participants living in the same house. The production used multi-positioned cameras, which enabled audiences to watch the show with different angles of rooms. Later in July 2016, 'Perfect Holiday 2' debuted with more rooms in different themes. It added new IP cameras that would follow the participants all the time, which increased the sense of entertainment.

Later in 2015, Mango TV introduced 'the Million Second Quiz' from NBC, hosted by Kevin Tsai. Keeping the main sections of the show, Mango TV added a new online interactive Q&A section.

In 2016, sponsored exclusively by JD.com, Mango TV produced 'Crime Scene'. It originated from a Korean show and featured content in both thrill and humor.
