= Huangjia =

Huangjia may refer to the following locations in China:

- Huangjia, Anhui (黄甲镇), town in Tongcheng
- Huangjia, Shandong (黄夹镇), town in Laoling
