= Zhengdian =

Zhengdian may refer to:

- Zhengdian (book), a 742 Chinese political treatise written by Liu Zhi
- Zhengdian, Shandong, a town in Laoling, Shandong, China
- Zhengdian Subdistrict, a subdistrict in Jiangxia District, Wuhan, Hubei, China
