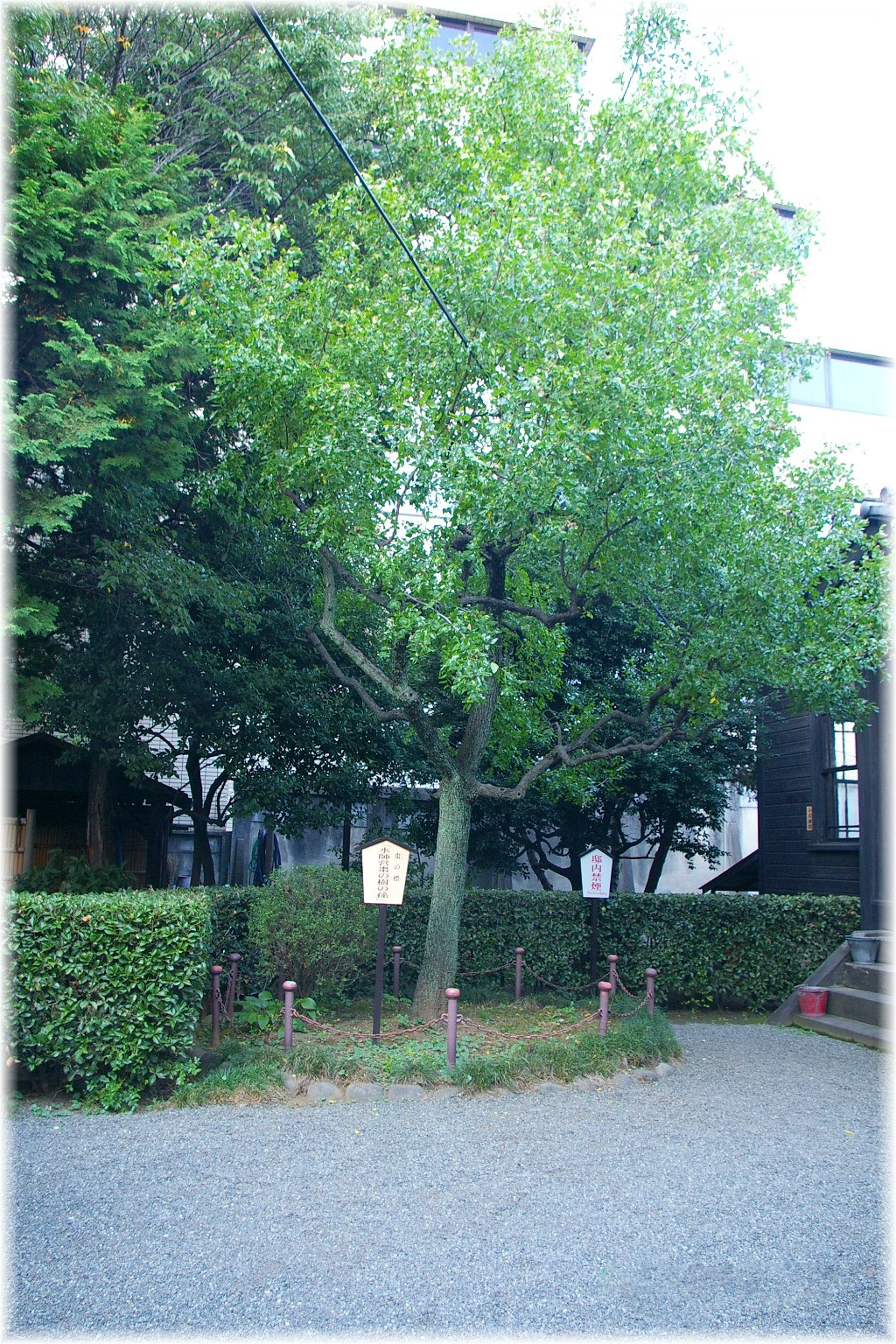
- Ziziphus jujuba, habitus

Conservation status
- Least Concern (IUCN 3.1)

Scientific classification
- Kingdom: Plantae
- Clade: Tracheophytes
- Clade: Angiosperms
- Clade: Eudicots
- Clade: Rosids
- Order: Rosales
- Family: Rhamnaceae
- Genus: Ziziphus
- Species: Z. jujuba

Binomial name
- Ziziphus jujuba Mill.

Synonyms
- Girtanneria jujuba (Mill.) Neck.; Jububa mediterranea Bubani; Mansana arborea J.F.Gmel.; Paliurus lucidus Carrière; Rhamnus circumcissa Russell ex Wall.; Rhamnus lucida Salisb.; Rhamnus mauritiana Soy.-Will.; Rhamnus soporifera Lour.; Rhamnus vulgaris Pers.; Rhamnus zizyphus L.; Ziziphus acidojujuba C.Y.Cheng & M.J.Liu; Ziziphus acidojujuba f. granulata C.Y.Cheng & M.J.Liu; Ziziphus acidojujuba f. infecunda C.Y.Cheng & M.J.Liu; Ziziphus acidojujuba f. trachysperma C.Y.Cheng & M.J.Liu; Ziziphus chinensis Spreng.; Ziziphus flexuosa Wall.; Ziziphus jujuba f. allochroa C.Y.Cheng & M.J.Liu; Ziziphus jujuba f. apyrena C.Y.Cheng & M.J.Liu; Ziziphus jujuba f. carnosicalycis C.Y.Cheng & M.J.Liu; Ziziphus jujuba f. heteroformis C.Y.Cheng & M.J.Liu; Ziziphus jujuba var. inermis (Bunge) Rehder; Ziziphus jujuba f. lageniformis (Nakai) Kitag.; Ziziphus jujuba subsp. spinosa (Bunge) J.Y.Peng, X.Y.Li & L.Li; Ziziphus jujuba var. spinosa (Bunge) Hu ex H.F.Chow; Ziziphus jujuba f. tortuosa C.Y.Cheng & M.J.Liu; Ziziphus melanogona Bojer; Ziziphus natsme Siebold; Ziziphus nitida Roxb.; Ziziphus officinarum Medik.; Ziziphus sativa Gaertn.; Ziziphus sativa var. inermis (Bunge) C.K.Schneid.; Ziziphus sativa var. lageniformis Nakai; Ziziphus sativa var. spinosa (Bunge) C.K.Schneid.; Ziziphus sinensis Lam.; Ziziphus soporifera (Lour.) Duhamel; Ziziphus sororia Schult.; Ziziphus spinosa (Bunge) Hu ex F.H.Chen; Ziziphus trinervia Roth; Ziziphus vulgaris Lam.; Ziziphus vulgaris var. inermis Bunge; Ziziphus vulgaris var. macrocarpa Risso; Ziziphus vulgaris var. oblonga Risso; Ziziphus vulgaris var. praecox Risso; Ziziphus vulgaris var. spinosa Bunge; Ziziphus zizyphus (L.) H.Karst.; Zizyphon jujubum (Mill.) St.-Lag.

= Jujube =

Species of plant with edible fruit

Jujube, raw
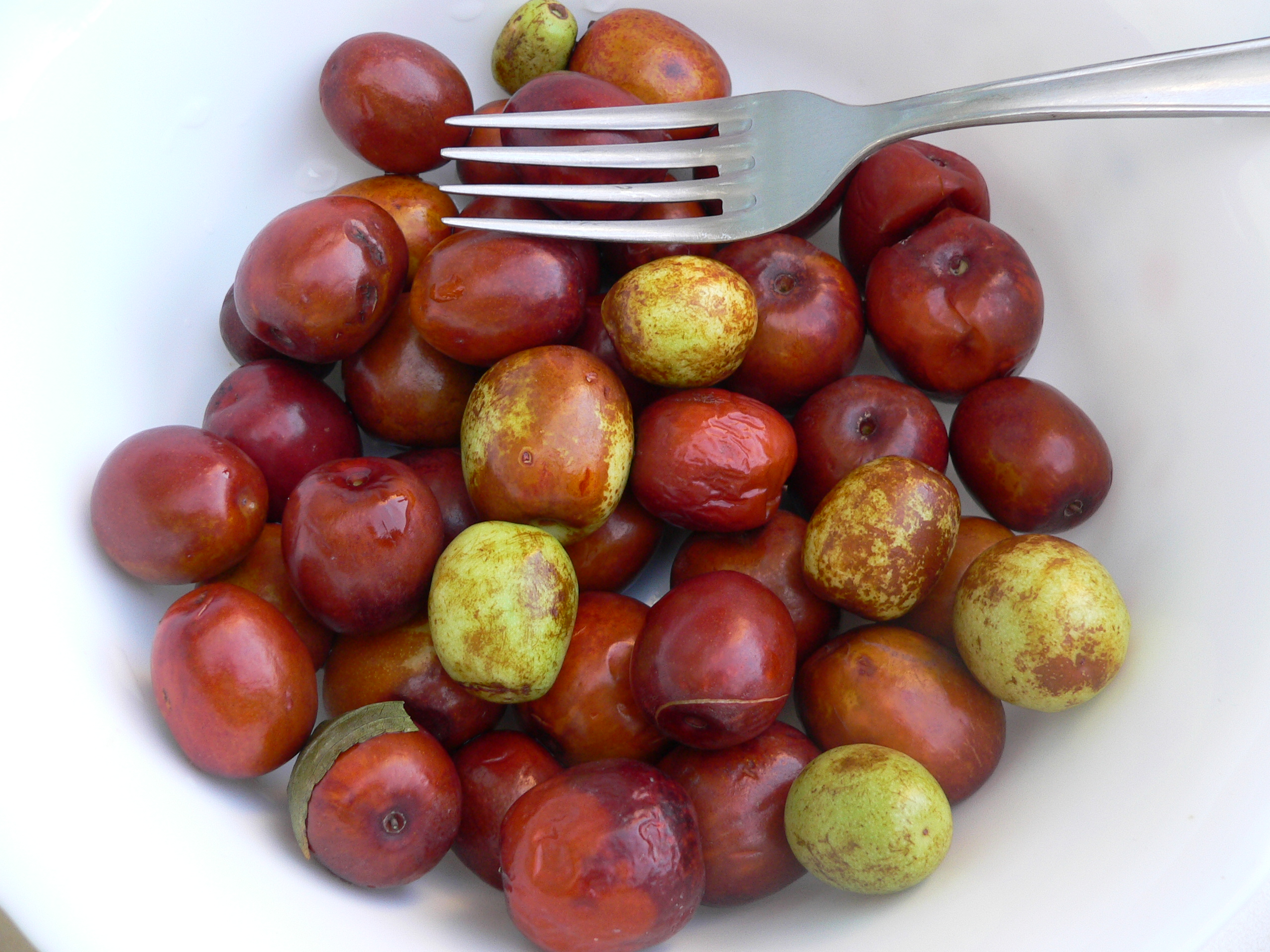
- Fresh jujube fruit

Nutritional value per 100 g (3.5 oz)
- Energy: 331 kJ (79 kcal)
- Carbohydrates: 20.23 g
- Fat: 0.2 g
- Protein: 1.2 g
Vitamins and minerals
Vitamins	Quantity %DV^{†}
Vitamin A equiv.	4% 40 μg
Thiamine (B1)	2% 0.02 mg
Riboflavin (B2)	3% 0.04 mg
Niacin (B3)	6% 0.9 mg
Vitamin B6	5% 0.081 mg
Vitamin C	77% 69 mg
Minerals	Quantity %DV^{†}
Calcium	2% 21 mg
Iron	3% 0.48 mg
Magnesium	2% 10 mg
Manganese	4% 0.084 mg
Phosphorus	2% 23 mg
Potassium	8% 250 mg
Sodium	0% 3 mg
Zinc	0% 0.05 mg
- Other constituents: Quantity
- Water: 77.86 g
- Link to USDA Database entry
- ^{†}Percentages estimated using US recommendations for adults, except for potassium, which is estimated based on expert recommendation from the National Academies.

Jujube, dried
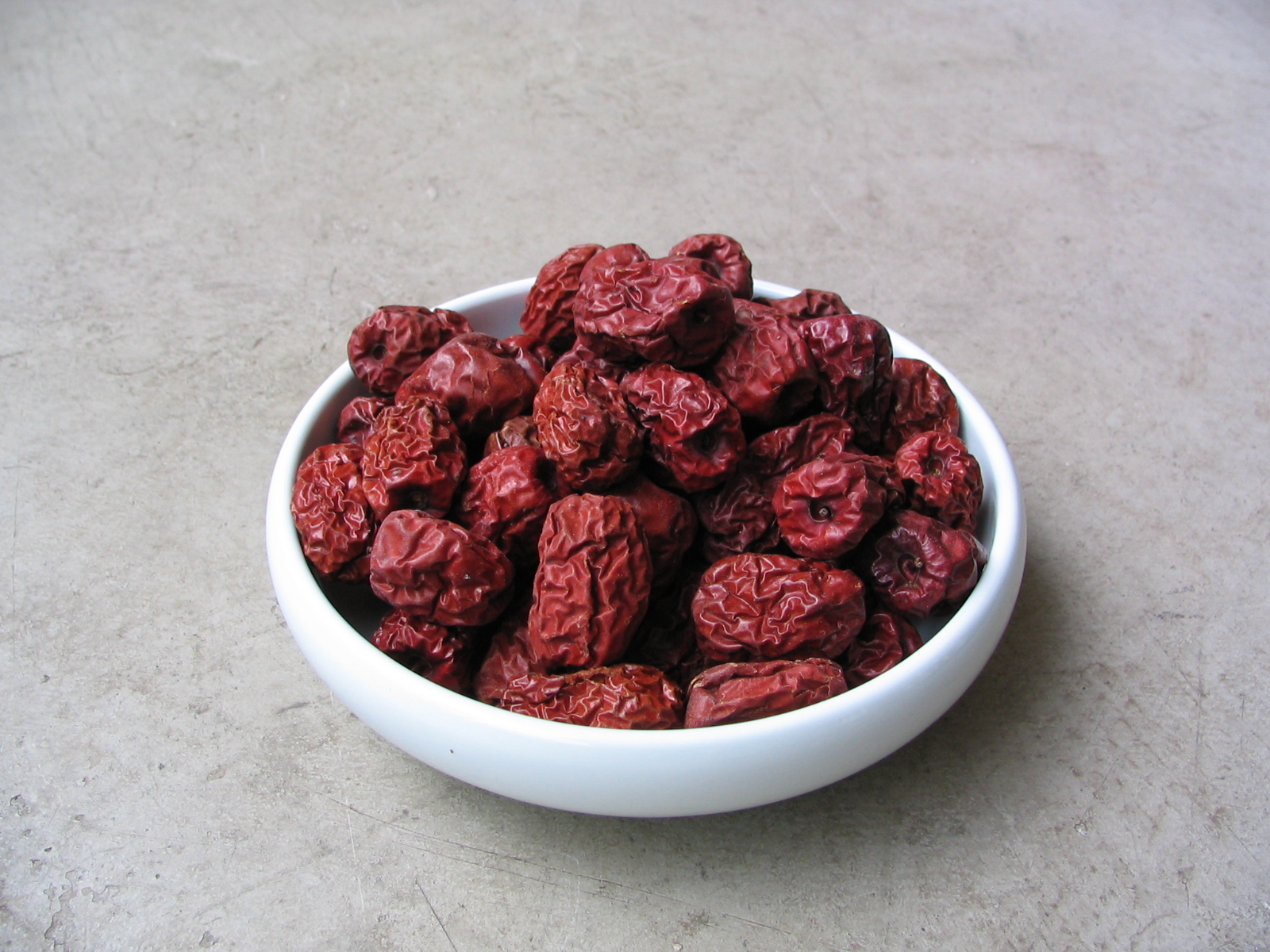
- Jujube fruit naturally turns red upon drying.

Nutritional value per 100 g (3.5 oz)
- Energy: 1,201 kJ (287 kcal)
- Carbohydrates: 73.6 g
- Fat: 1.1 g
- Protein: 3.7 g
Vitamins and minerals
Vitamins	Quantity %DV^{†}
Vitamin A equiv.	0% 0 μg
Thiamine (B1)	18% 0.21 mg
Riboflavin (B2)	28% 0.36 mg
Niacin (B3)	3% 0.5 mg
Vitamin B6	0% 0 mg
Vitamin C	14% 13 mg
Minerals	Quantity %DV^{†}
Calcium	6% 79 mg
Iron	10% 1.8 mg
Magnesium	9% 37 mg
Manganese	13% 0.305 mg
Phosphorus	8% 100 mg
Potassium	18% 531 mg
Sodium	0% 9 mg
Zinc	2% 0.19 mg
- Other constituents: Quantity
- Water: 19.7 g
- Link to USDA Database entry
- ^{†}Percentages estimated using US recommendations for adults, except for potassium, which is estimated based on expert recommendation from the National Academies.

Jujube (UK /ˈdʒuːdʒuːb/; US /ˈdʒudʒub/ or /ˈdʒudʒəbiː/; scientific name Ziziphus jujuba), jujuba, Chinese jujube, red date or Chinese date is a species in the genus Ziziphus in the buckthorn family Rhamnaceae. It is often confused with the closely related Indian jujube, Z. mauritiana. The jujube tolerates a diverse range of climates, from temperate to tropical. Its origin is thought to be in eastern Asia, but it has been widely dispersed through cultivation, and is today cultivated in gardens as a shrub as well as in agriculture as a food crop. Its fruit is eaten freshly harvested as well as dried and candied.

== Names ==
The name jujuba is directly Latin while jujube through a Romance language (likely French jujube), both derive from Classical zizyphum (used for the fruit) and zizyphus (the tree) from Ancient Greek ζίζυφον zízyphon. The name jujube is not connected to botanically unrelated jojoba (Simmondsia chinensis) hispanicized from native Oʼodham hohohwi.

Jujube fruits are also known as "red dates" or "Chinese dates" by resemblance to date fruits of the Phoenix dactylifera palm.

== Description ==
It is a small deciduous tree or shrub reaching a height of 5–10 metres (16–33 feet), usually with thorny branches. The leaves are shiny-green, ovate-acute, 2–7 centimetres (3/4–2 3/4 inches) long and 1–3 cm (3/8–1 1/8 in) wide, with three conspicuous veins at the base, and a finely toothed margin. Leaves of trees grown in the climate region in Turkey measure average between 3.8–4.28 cm in length and 1.79–1.98 cm in width. The flowers are small, 5 millimetres (1/4 in) wide, with five inconspicuous yellowish-green petals.

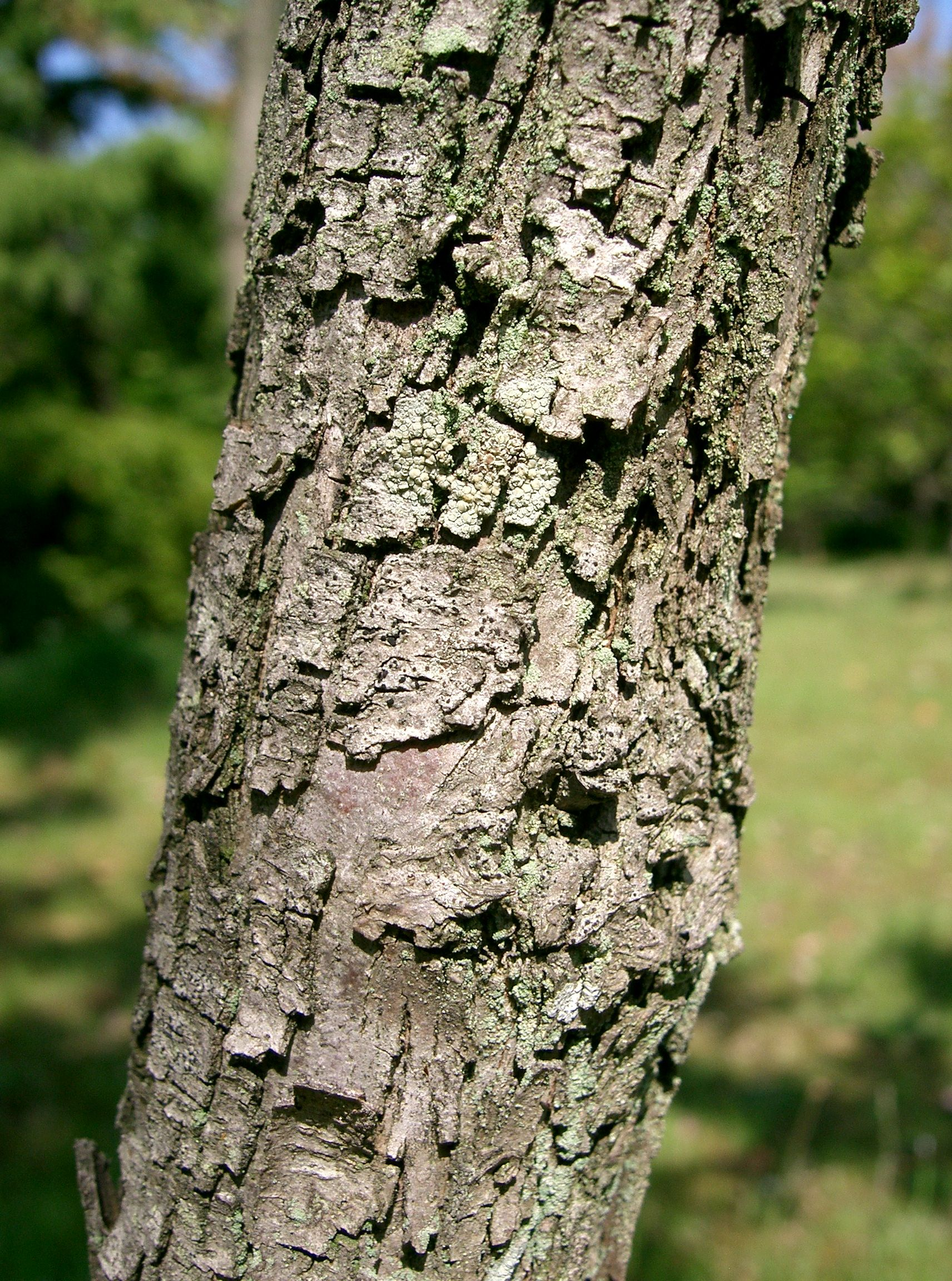
Bark

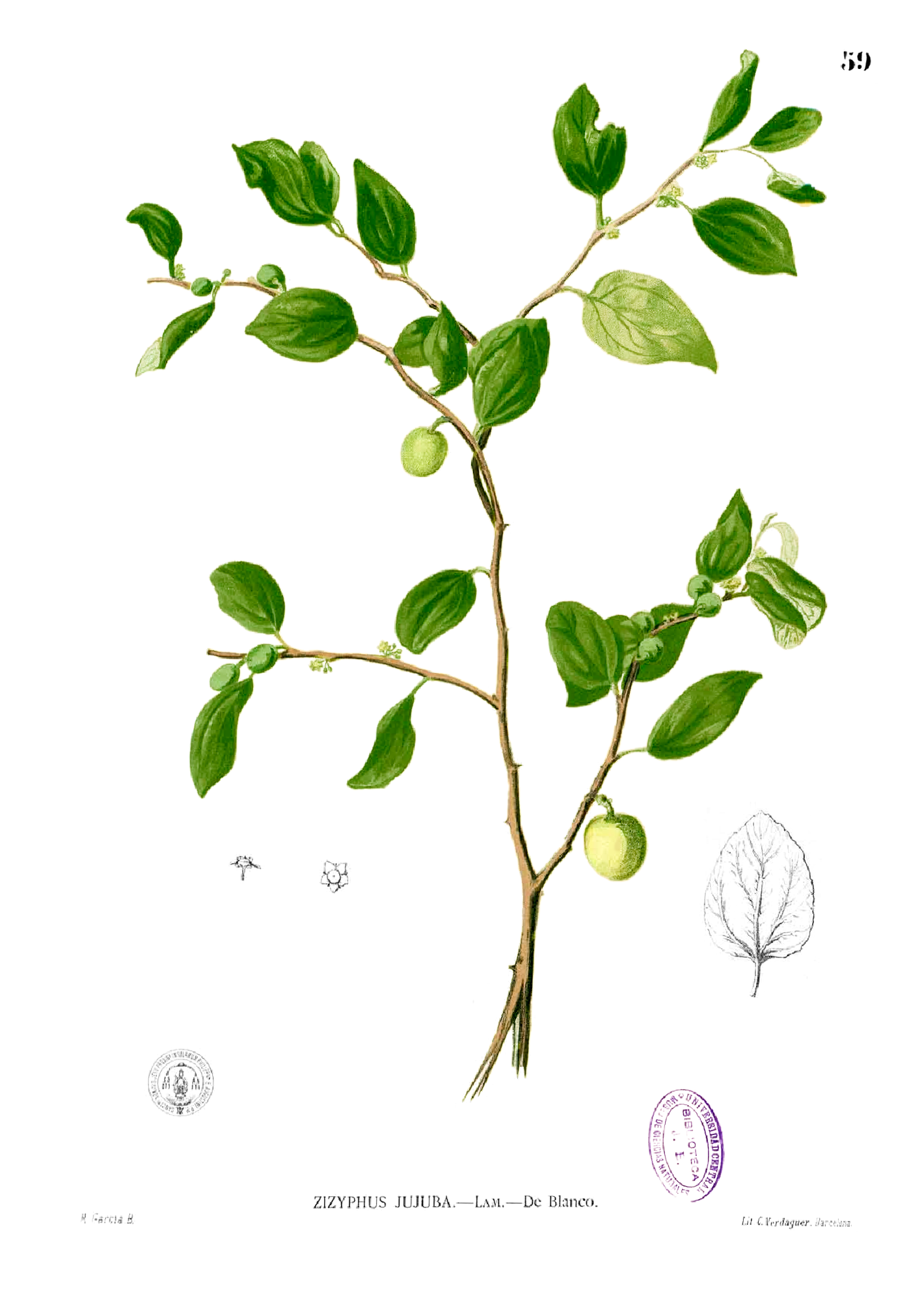
Plate from the book Flora de Filipinas

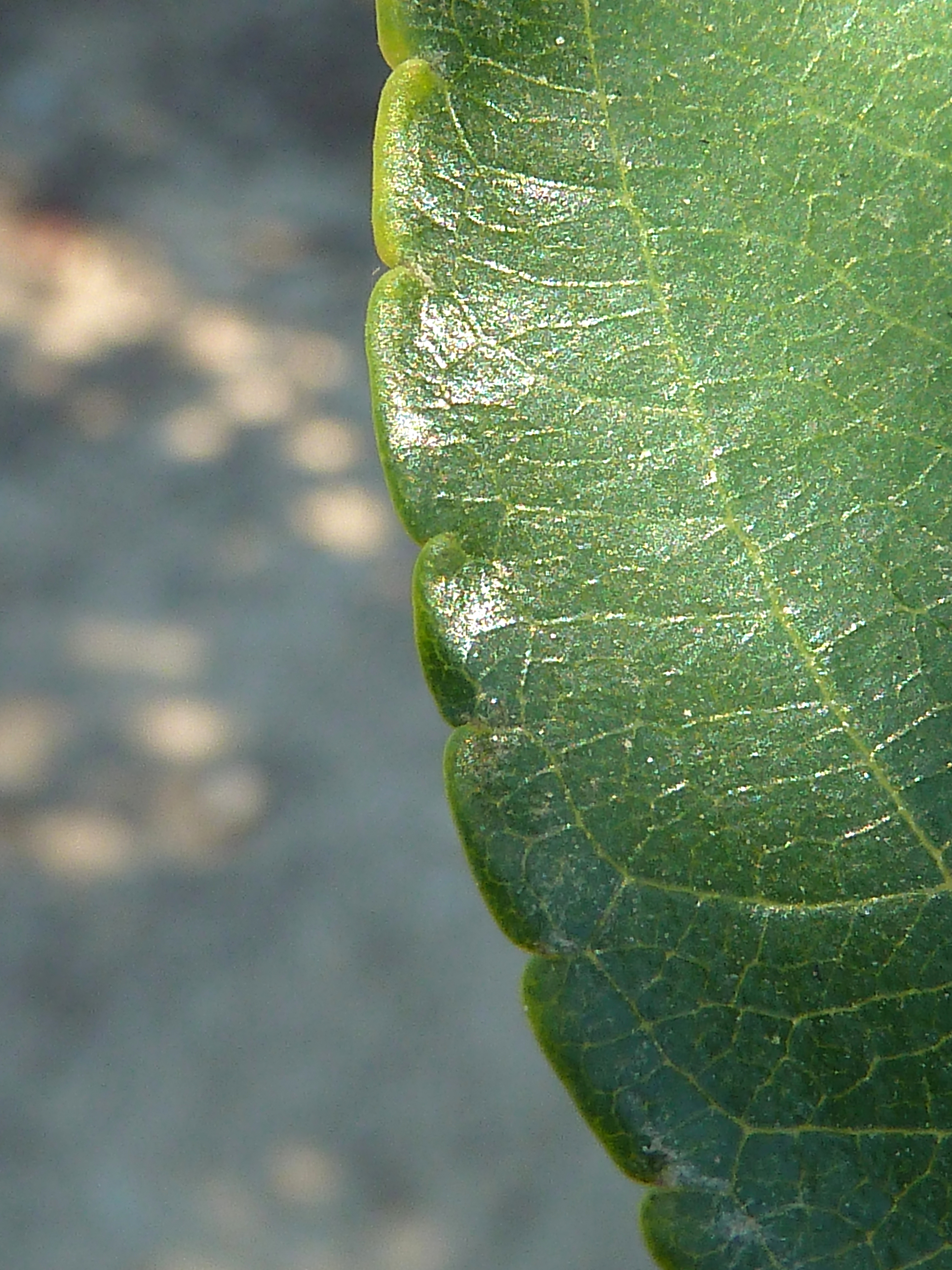
Leaf margin

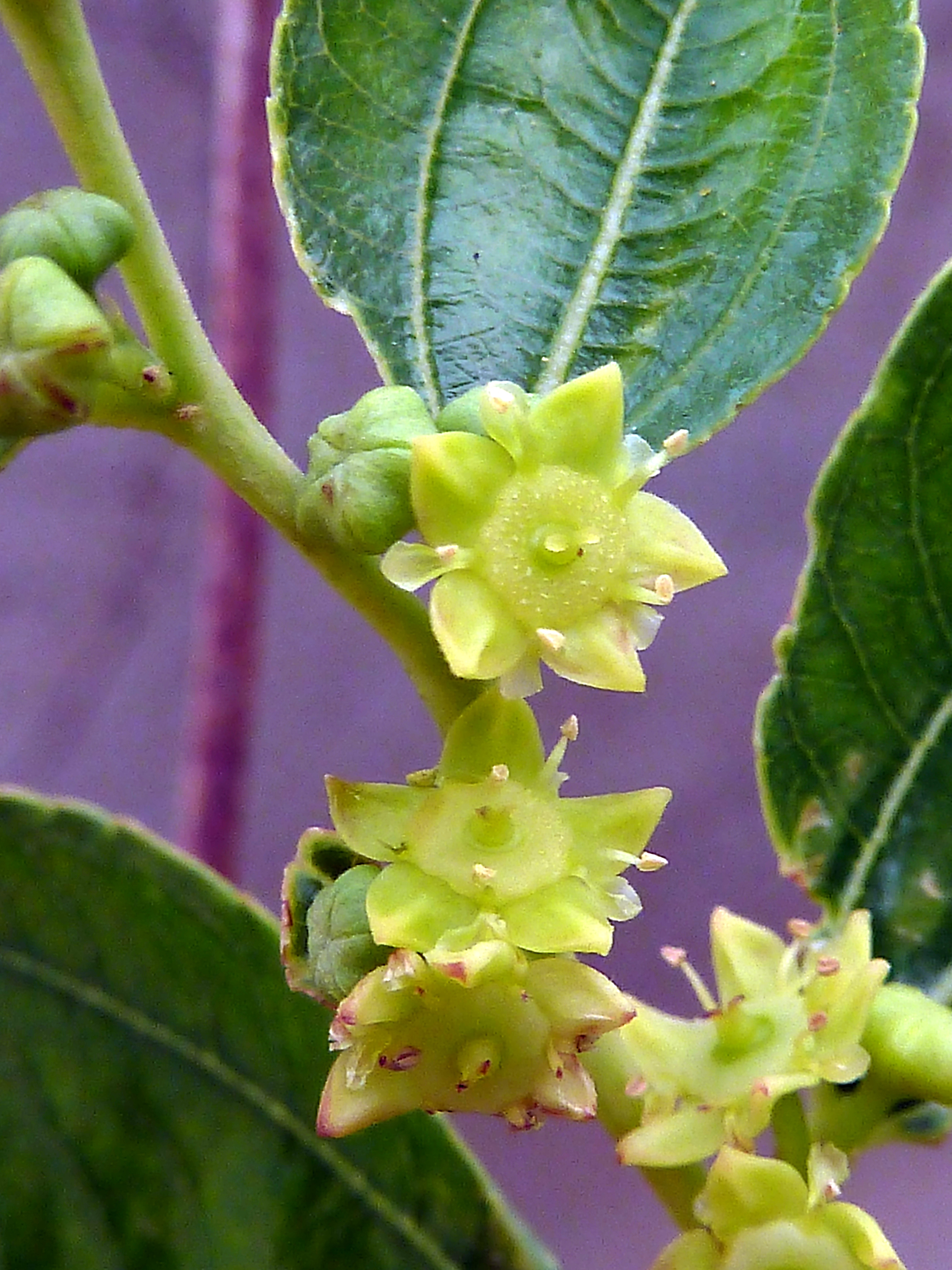
Flowers

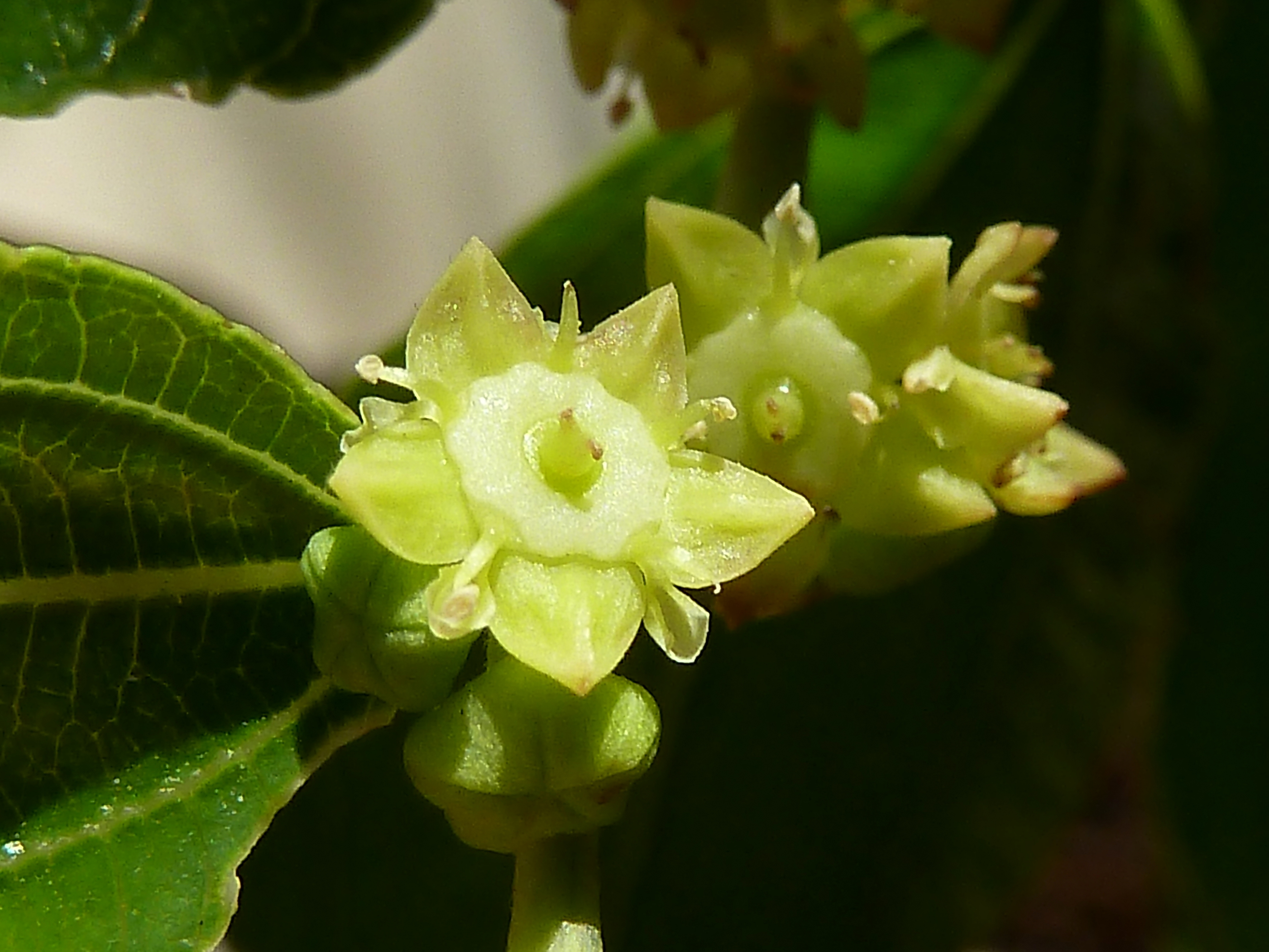
Close-up of flowers

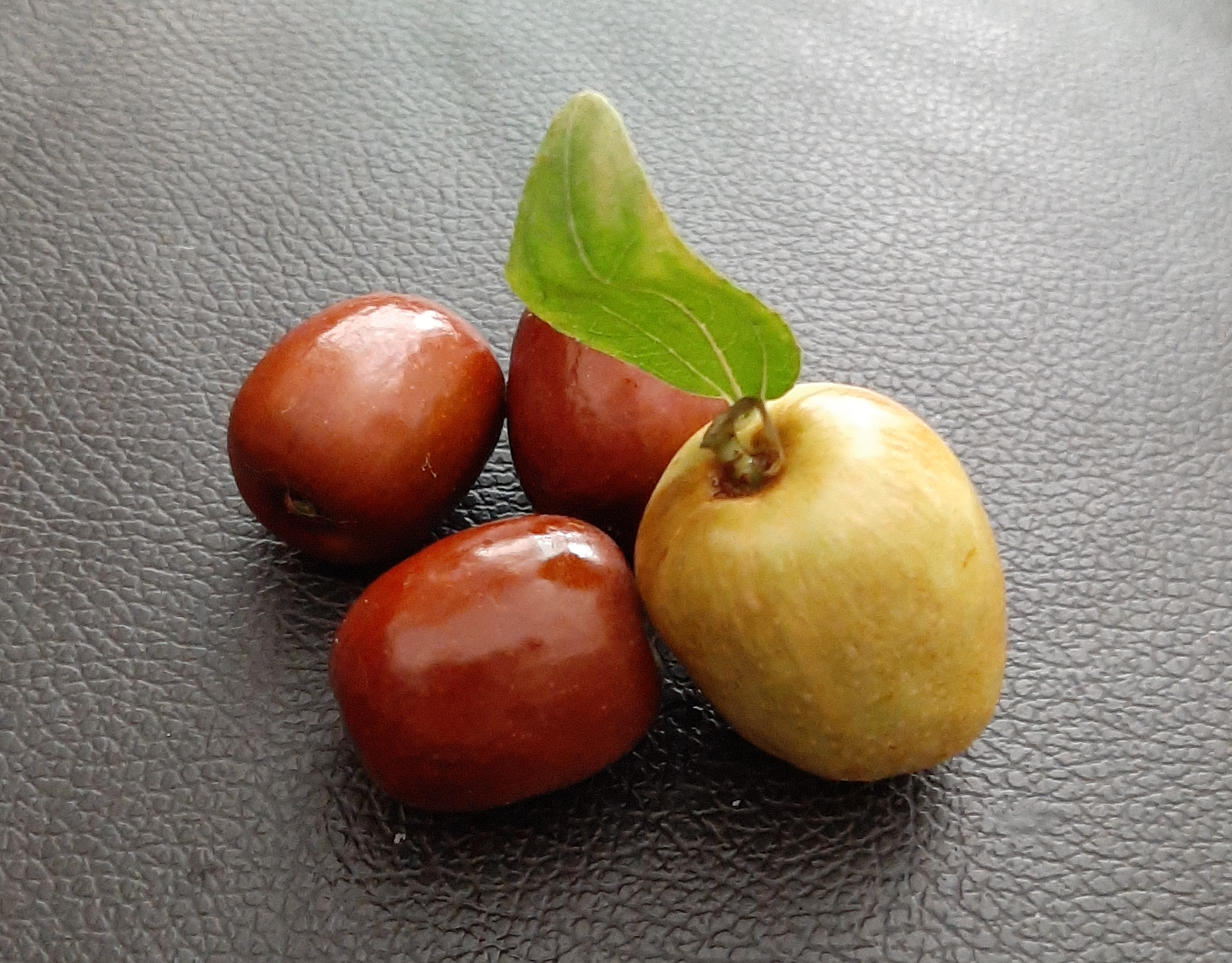

The fruit is an edible oval drupe 1.5–3 cm (5/8–1 1/8 in) deep; when immature it is smooth-green, with the consistency and taste of an apple with lower acidity, maturing brown to purplish-black, and eventually wrinkled, looking like a small date. There is a single hard kernel, similar to an olive stone, containing two seeds. Modern cultivated jujubes have kernels up to 3.8 times larger than those of wild jujubes.

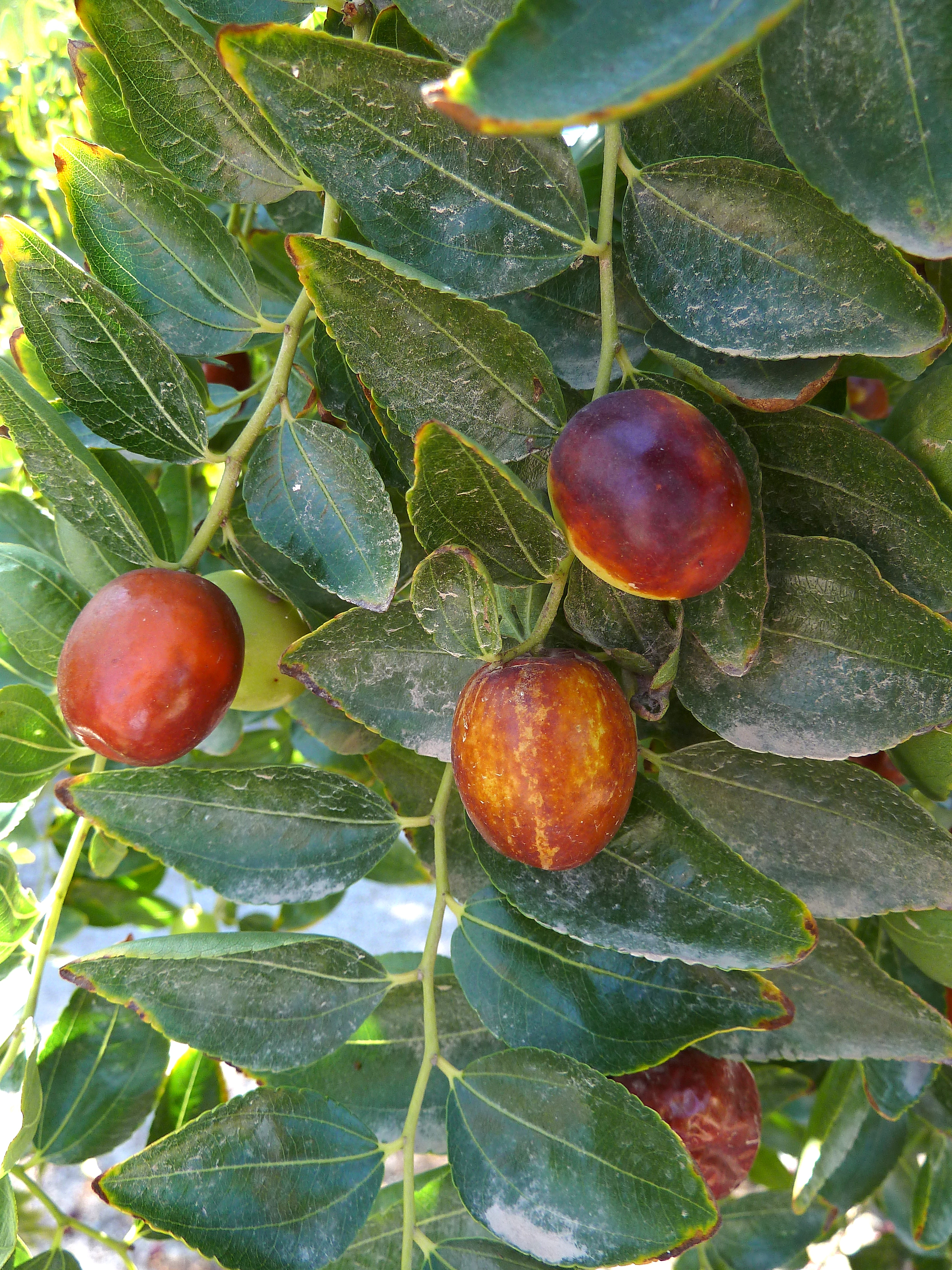
Fruit

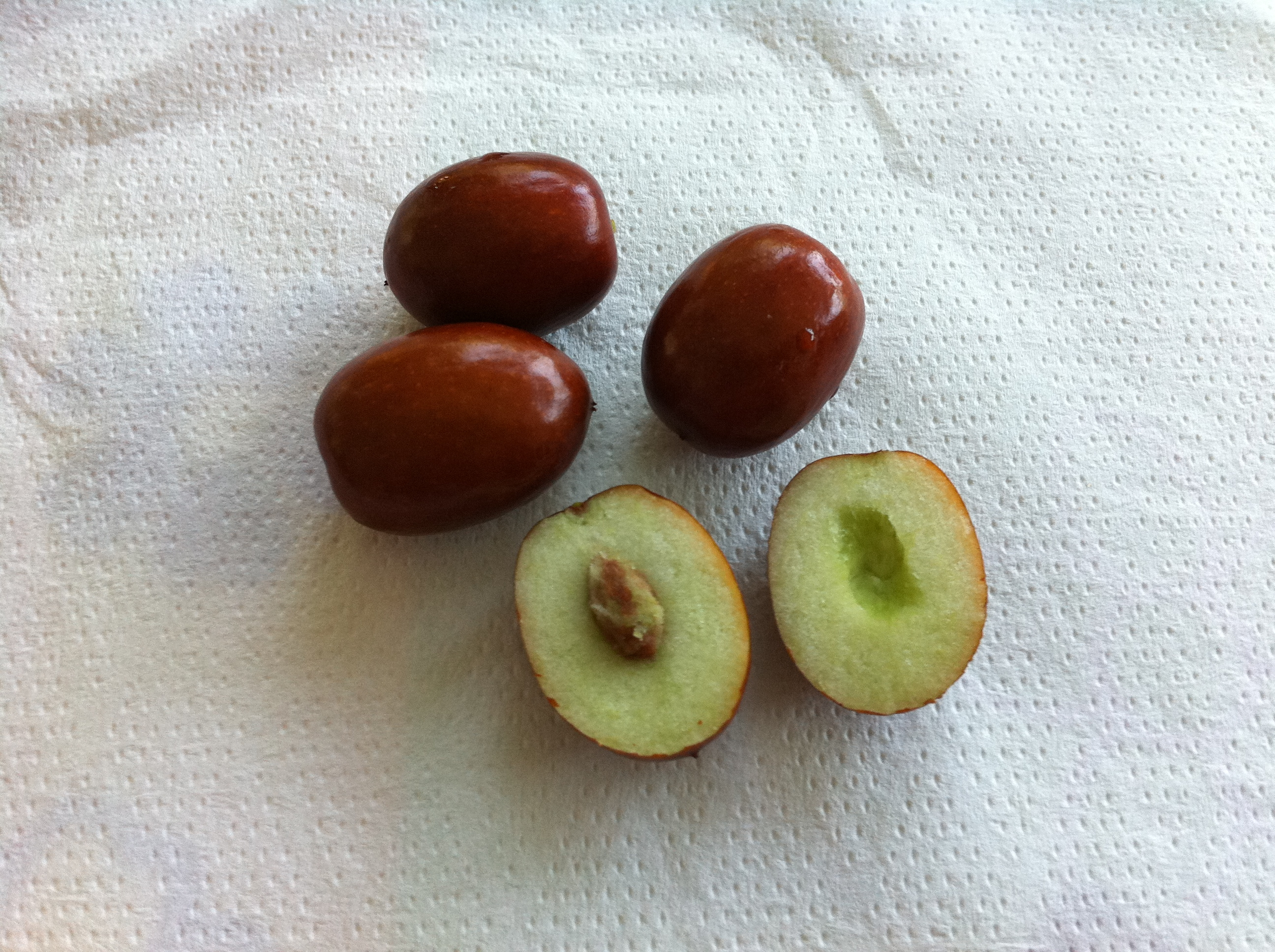
Fruit cross-section

=== Chemistry ===
The leaves contain saponin and ziziphin, which suppresses the ability to perceive sweet taste.

Flavonoids found in the fruits include kaempferol 3-O-rutinoside, quercetine 3-O-robinobioside, quercetine 3-O-rutinoside. Terpenoids such as colubrinic acid, zizyberenalic acid, and alphitolic acid were found in the fruits.

== Taxonomy ==
The binomial name has a complex history, due to a combination of botanical naming regulations, and variations in spelling. It was first named in the binomial system by Carl Linnaeus as Rhamnus zizyphus, in Species Plantarum (1753). Philip Miller, in his Gardener's Dictionary, considered that the jujube and its relatives were sufficiently distinct from Rhamnus to be placed in a separate genus (as it had already been by the pre-Linnaean author Tournefort in 1700), and in the 1768 edition he gave it the name Ziziphus jujuba (using Tournefort's spelling for the genus name).

For the species name, he used a different name, as tautonyms (repetition of exactly the same name in the genus and species) are not permitted in botanical naming. However, because of Miller's slightly different spelling, the combination of the earlier species name (from Linnaeus) with the new genus, Ziziphus zizyphus, is not a tautonym, and was therefore permitted as a botanical name. This combination was made by Hermann Karsten in 1882. In 2006, a proposal was made to suppress the name Ziziphus zizyphus in favour of Ziziphus jujuba, and this proposal was accepted in 2011. Ziziphus jujuba is thus the correct scientific name for this species.

== Distribution and habitat ==
Its precise natural distribution is uncertain due to extensive cultivation. However, its origin is thought to be in eastern Asia, in southern and central China, India, Korea, and Japan, and possibly also southwestern Asia between Lebanon, and southeastern Europe, though more likely introduced there.

The Chinese jujube enjoys a diverse range of climates from temperate to tropical (whereas the Indian jujube is restricted to warmer subtropical and tropical climates). The tree tolerates a wide range of temperatures and rainfall, though it requires hot summers and sufficient water for acceptable fruiting. Unlike most of the other species in the genus, it tolerates fairly cold winters, surviving temperatures down to about −15 °C (5 °F), and the tree is, for instance, commonly cultivated in Beijing. This wide tolerance enables the jujube to grow in mountain or desert habitats, provided there is access to underground water throughout the summer. The jujube or Z. jujuba grows in cool regions of Asia; five or more other species of Ziziphus on the other hand are widely distributed in milder climates to warmer deserts of Asia and Africa.

This plant has been introduced in Madagascar and grows as an invasive species in the western part of the island, threatening mostly protected areas. It is cultivated in parts of southern California.

== Cultivation ==
=== Asia ===
Chinese jujubes have been grown in parts of Asia for thousands of years. Wild jujube kernels have been found in three sites on the Qi River basin of northern China dating to the Neolithic period. It may have originated in Syria, but was distributed across the Mediterranean region at least 3,000 years ago. Today, it is most widely grown in China. The tree is tolerant of droughts and flooding, and can be cultivated on a large scale.

=== North America ===
Jujubes are grown as a garden shrub throughout most of the southern half of North America, doing particularly well in parts of California. Cultivars include Li, Lang, Sherwood, Silverhill (also known as Tiger Tooth), So, Shui Men, and GA 866.

=== Australia ===
Agricultural growers have started to plant Chinese jujubes in Australia since around 2000. A family farm in Renmark, South Australia has been growing the fruit since 2015. Seeka, the largest producer of kiwi fruit and nashi pears in Australia, produces abundant crops of jujubes, and was looking at exporting some of its output as the dried product. In 2023 the company was planning to expand its production by planting around 40,000 jujube trees on its land near Shepparton, Victoria. By mid-2025, there were about 60 growers and around 50,000 trees planted in Australia, according to AgriFutures Australia. Growers said that a national body was needed to establish export markets and create more public awareness of the fruit domestically.

== Pests ==
Witch's broom, prevalent in China and Korea, is the main disease affecting jujubes, though plantings in North America currently are not affected by any pests or diseases. In Europe, the last several years have seen some 80%–90% of the jujube crop eaten by insect larvae, including those of the false codling moth (Thaumatotibia leucotreta).

== Uses ==
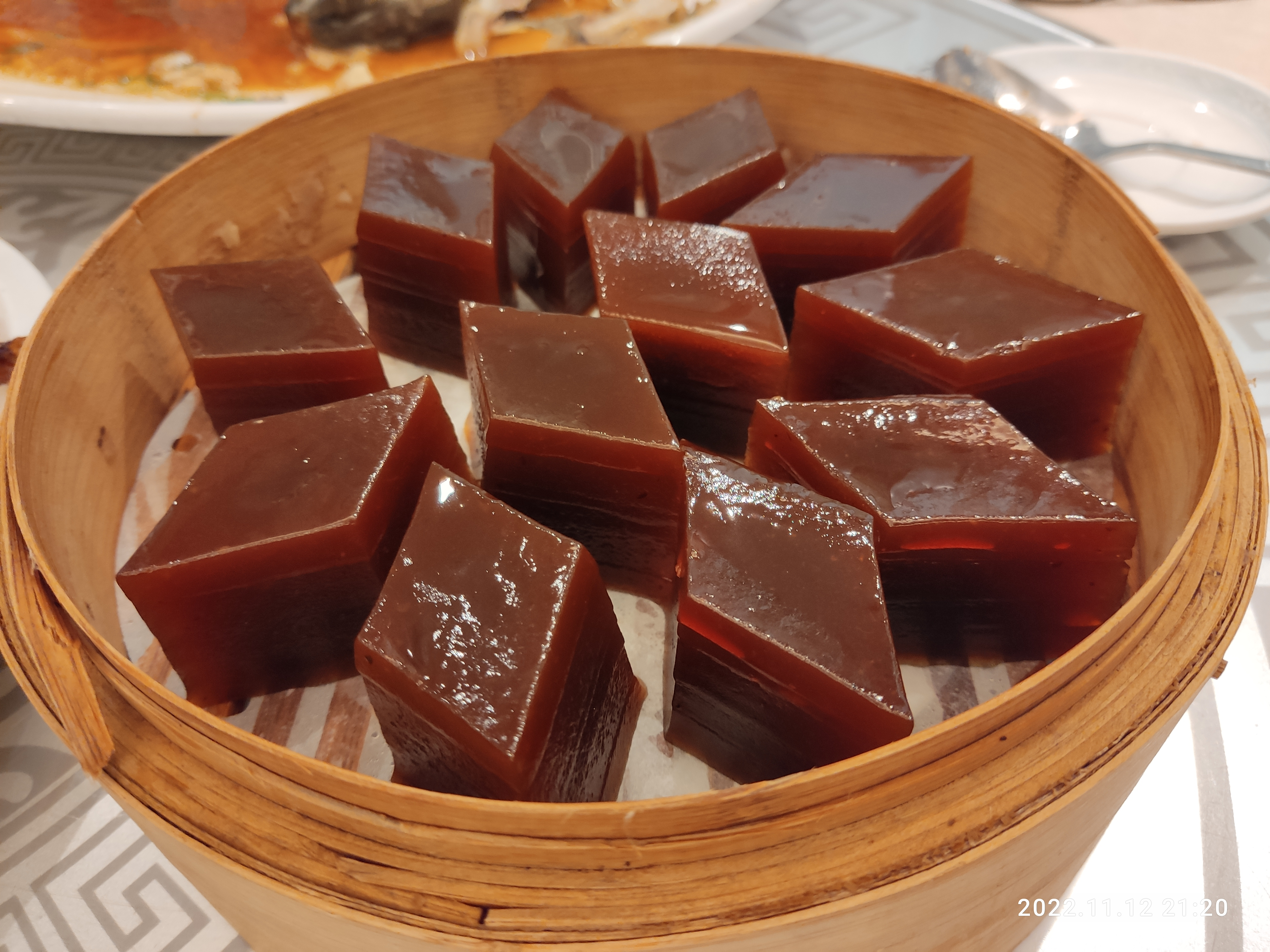
Steamed jujube cakes in a zhenglong

=== Culinary ===
Freshly harvested and candied dried fruit are often eaten as a snack or with coffee. Smoked jujubes are consumed in Vietnam and are referred to as black jujubes. A drink can be made by crushing the pulp in water.

In Vietnam and Taiwan, fully mature, nearly ripe fruit is harvested and sold on the local markets and also exported to Southeast Asian countries. The dried fruit is used in desserts in China and Vietnam, such as ching bo leung, a cold beverage that includes the dried jujube, longan, fresh seaweed, barley, and lotus seeds.

On his visit to Medina, the 19th-century English explorer, Sir Richard Burton, observed that the local varieties of the fruit were widely eaten. He describes its taste as like "a bad plum, an unripe cherry, and an insipid apple". He gives the local names for three varieties as "Hindi (Indian), Baladi (native), Tamri (date-like)." A hundred years ago, a close variety was common in the Jordan valley and around Jerusalem. The bedouin valued the fruit, calling it nabk. It could be dried and kept for winter or made into a paste which was used as bread.

Traditionally in India, the fruits are dried in the sun and the hard seeds removed, after which the dried flesh is pounded with tamarind, red chillies, salt, and jaggery. In some parts of the Indian state of Tamil Nadu, fresh whole ripe fruit is crushed with the above ingredients and sun-dried to make cakes called ilanthai vadai or regi vadiyalu (Telugu). It is also commonly consumed as a snack.

In Madagascar, jujube fruit is eaten fresh or dried. People also use it to make jam. A jujube honey is produced in the Atlas Mountains of Morocco.

Italy has an alcoholic syrup called brodo di giuggiole.

In Australia jujube beer is made.

In Laoling, China, jujube juice and wine are made.

=== Traditional Chinese medicine ===
The fruit and its seeds are used in Traditional Chinese Medicine, Traditional Korean Medicine and Kampo for many purposes. Some investigational research indicates possibilities related to their traditional use to alleviate stress and for sedation.

=== Other uses ===
In Japan, the natsume has given its name to a style of tea caddy used in the Japanese tea ceremony, due to the similar shape. Its hard, oily wood was, along with pear, used for woodcuts to print books starting in the 8th century and continuing through the 19th in China and neighboring countries. As many as 2000 copies could be produced from one jujube woodcut.

== Culture ==
In Arabic-speaking regions the jujube and alternatively the species Z. lotus are closely related to the lote-trees (sing. سدرة sidrah, pl. سدر sidr) which are mentioned in the Quran, while in Palestine the species Z. spina-christi is called sidr.

An ancient jujube tree in the city Al-Qurnah, Iraq, is claimed by locals as the Tree of Knowledge mentioned in the Bible. Local tradition holds that the place where the city was built was the original site of the Garden of Eden (a passage in the Book of Genesis creation narrative says that a river flowed from the garden and split into Tigris and Euphrates rivers, where the city is currently). The tree is a tourist spot in the town.

Jujube tree is important in Hinduism too as Vishnu is worshipped in a major temple, in Badrinath, from the Sanskrit compound Badarīnātha, consisting of the terms badarī (jujube tree) and nātha (lord), an epithet of Vishnu.

== See also ==
- Date palm – Palm tree cultivated for its sweet fruit
