= In the Name of Blossom =

- Promotional poster
- 锦绣芳华
- Genre: Historical; Business; Romance
- Based on: Flourished Peony by Yi Qianchong
- Written by: Zhang Yuanang
- Directed by: Ding Ziguang
- Starring: Yang Zi; Li Xian
- Opening theme: Song of the Sea of Clouds
- Ending theme: Fang Hua Yin by Zhang Zining
- Country of origin: China
- Original language: Mandarin
- No. of seasons: 2 (Note: This series is the second season.)
- No. of episodes: 24

Production
- Executive producer: Sun Xu
- Production locations: Laoling Film Studio; Hengdian World Studios
- Production companies: Zhejiang Huace Film & TV Co. Ltd.

Original release
- Network: Hunan Television; Mango TV; Migu Video
- Release: 30 June – 19 July 2025

Related
- Flourished Peony

In the Name of Blossom (Chinese: 锦绣芳华; pinyin: Jǐn Xiù Fāng Huá) is a 2025 Chinese historical television series directed by Ding Ziguang and produced by Croton Media. It is based on the novel Flourished Peony by Yi Qianchong and stars Yang Zi and Li Xian in the lead roles. It is the second season of the television series Flourished Peony. The series premiered on Mango TV and Migu Video on 30 June. It was released on Hunan Television's Golden Eagle Theatre on 3 July, and ended its run on 19 July.

== Synopsis ==
The owner of Chang'an's Fangyuan Garden, He Weifang, gains notoriety for arranging a peony display for visiting dignitaries. She transitions from business to compassion after learning the truth about her mother's death, starting clinics and instructing trades. She and Jiang Chang Yang support the emperor throughout a period of political turmoil and assist in quelling Prince Ning's uprising, all the while fostering a strong, resilient love.

== Cast ==
=== Main ===
- Yang Zi as He Weifang
- Li Xian as Jiang Changyang

=== Supporting ===
- Wei Zheming as Liu Chang
- Zhang Yaqin as Li Youzhen
- Tu Songyan as Prince Ning
- Qu Zheming as the Emperor
- Shen Mengchen as Huangfu Lingge
- Tong Mengshi as Li Xing
- Dong Jie as Aunt Feng
- Shao Yun as Qin Shengyi
- Xin Peng as Wang Qing
- Yang Kun as Aunt Sun
- Guan Le as Zhu Fu
- Sun Meilin as Lü Gengchun
- Zhang Qi as Xu Zuping
- Xu Lingyue as Xiao Xuexi

Jiang Changyang's sister-in-law.

- Zhang Lei as Father Liu

Liu Chang's father.

- Hao Wenting as Mother Liu

Liu Chang's mother.

- Gu Zicheng as Qin Liulang
- Yuan Ran as mother of He Weifang
- Chen Sisi as aunt of He Weifang
- Liao Yinyue as Yu Lu
- Bao Chenxi as Lian Zhou
- Ma Yi as Cao Yuying

Deputy head of the flower business.

- Guo Zhe as Chuan Yu

Jiang Changyang's bodyguard.

- Zhou Pu as Uncle Wu

Manager of the private home for orphans which was opened by Jiang Changyang.

- Lin Zilu as Bi Yu

Li Youzhen's personal maid.

- Xie Xin as Madam Yun

Owner of Hua Yun Lou.

- Wang Tianyu as Qiu Shi

Liu Chang's guard.

- Mu Tong as She Yan

Emperor's guard.

- Chen Yilong as Pei Zhong
- Kui Yuan as Ah Tao
- Hu Yiyan as Qing Que
- Ni Hanjin as Yu Zheng
- Gao Sheng as Ah Ci

== Soundtrack ==
No.	Title	Lyrics	Music	Singer(s)	Length
1.	"Liu Fang (流芳)" (Theme Song)	Jin Dazhou; Wu Shuting	Jin Dazhou	Tan Weiwei
2.	"Bu Feng Bu Ruo (不逢不若)" (Interlude)	Wang Yuyan		Yang Zi
3.	"Ru Shuang (如霜)" (Interlude)	Zhang Pengpeng; Jin Dazhou	Jin Dazhou	Jam Hsiao
4.	"Qing Niao Gui (青鸟归)" (Interlude)	Zhang Pengpeng; Jin Dazhou	Jin Dazhou	Terry Lin
5.	"Yu Zhang Xing (豫章行)" (Interlude)	Fu Xuan	Wang Shimi	Guo Keyu
6.	"Fang Hua Yin (芳华吟)" (Ending Theme Song)	Wu Shuting; Jin Dazhou	Sun Aili	Zhang Zining
7.	"Song of the Sea of Cloud (云海长歌)" (Opening Music)		Jin Dazhou

== Production ==
The filming began on January 2, 2024 in Hengdian World Studios. The crew later moved to Xiangyang and Laoling Film Studio in north China's Shandong province. Flourished Peony and In the Name of Blossom were filmed at the same time. Yang Zi and Li Xian acted in the lead roles. This series is their third collaboration after the 2019 hit television series Go Go Squid! and the 2020 film Soul Snatcher.

== Accolades ==
Year	Award	Category	Nominee(s)	Result	Ref.
2025	30th Asian Television Award	Best Production Design	Zhu Hanbing	Nominated	
2025	16th Macau International Television Festival	Best Television Drama	In the Name of Blossom	Nominated	
2025	16th Macau International Television Festival	Best Director	Ding Ziguang	Nominated	
2025	16th Macau International Television Festival	Best Actor	Li Xian	Nominated	
2025	16th Macau International Television Festival	Best Actress	Yang Zi	Nominated	
2025	16th Macau International Television Festival	Best Screeplay	Zhang Yuan'ang	Nominated	
2026	China Literature IP Ceremony	Most Popular IP Adaptation of the Year	In the Name of Blossom	Won	
2026	22nd Chinese American Television Festival	Best Television Series	In the Name of Blossom	Pending	
