= C30H44O3 =

The molecular formula C_{30}H_{44}O_{3} (molar mass: 452.67 g/mol) may refer to:

- Boldenone undecylenate, or boldenone undecenoate
- Ethandrostate, also known as ethinylandrostenediol 3β-cyclohexanepropionate
- Zizyberenalic acid
