= Flourished Peony =

- 国色芳华
- Genre: Historical; Business; Romance
- Based on: Flourished Peony by Yi Qianzhong
- Written by: Zhang Yuanang
- Directed by: Ding Ziguang
- Starring: Yang Zi; Li Xian
- Opening theme: "Song of the Sea of Clouds"
- Ending theme: "Fang Hua Yin" by Zhang Zining
- Country of origin: China
- Original language: Mandarin
- No. of episodes: 32

Production
- Executive producer: Sun Xu
- Production locations: Laoling Film Studio; Hengdian World Studios; Xiangyang
- Production companies: Huace Film & TV; Hunan Radio and Television; Hunan Happy Sunshine Interactive Entertainment; Migu Culture & Technology

Original release
- Network: Hunan Television; Mango TV; Migu Video
- Release: 7 January – 2 February 2025

Related
- In the Name of Blossom

Flourished Peony (Chinese: 国色芳华; pinyin: Guó Sè Fāng Huá) is a 2025 Chinese historical television series directed by Ding Ziguang and produced by Huace Media. It stars Yang Zi and Li Xian in the lead roles. Adapted from Yi Qianzhong's novel of the same name, the series is set in the Tang dynasty and follows the story of He Weifang, the daughter of a merchant and Jiang Changyang, the "Flower and Bird Envoy" of Chang'an.

The series premiered on Mango TV and Migu Video starting January 7. It was released on Hunan Television's Golden Eagle Theatre on January 9 and ended its run on February 2. It also premiered internationally on multiple platforms including Netflix, VIU, Viki, Line TV, MyVideo, Astro, K+, Vidio, TrueVisions Now and MOA covering 80 countries and regions.

Flourished Peony was a commercial and critical success, becoming the series with the highest investment in the history of Hunan TV and Mango TV. The series received two nomination at the 30th Shanghai Television Festival, winning the Best Art Direction Award. It was nominated for Best Television Series award at the 33rd China TV Golden Eagle Awards and 2nd Golden Panda Award and has a direct continuation titled In the Name of Blossom which serves as its sequel.

Flourished Peony marks the second collaboration between Yang Zi and Li Xian following their 2019 television series Go Go Squid!.

== Plot ==
The story is set in the Tang dynasty and follows He Weifang, a merchant's daughter who can cultivate rare peonies. She goes to Chang'an after leaving a marriage of convenience. After meeting Jiang Changyang (played by Li Xian), the "Flower and Bird Envoy" there, the two form a partnership.

He Weifang leads a group of downtrodden women to establish "Hua Man Zhu", a flower shop. After much difficulty, they succeed in a patriarchal society. As He Weifang and Jiang Changyang grow closer, she realizes that Jiang Changyang, known as the most corrupt official in the dynasty, is actually an honest man working as a spy for the emperor. They marry and eventually fall in love. Together they work for the greater good.

== Cast ==
=== Main ===
Actor	Character	Introduction
Yang Zi Li Meiyi (young)	He Weifang	Daughter of a merchant and the owner of the flower shop "Hua Man Zhu". She was forced to marry Liu Chang in exchange for medicine for her gravely ill mother. Later she discovers that the medicine she received was fake, resulting in her mother's death. Distressed, she seeks divorce from Liu Chang. With the help of Jiang Changyang, she escapes to Chang'an from Luoyang. Partnering with him, she uses her exceptional skills in cultivating rare peonies and her intelligence to enter the business world of Chang'an. She marries Jiang Changyang. She begins to cultivate flowers behind the Jiang residence and eventually establishes "Wu Yong Tang", leading a group of women toward economic independence in a patriarchal society.
Li Xian Song Cuiqihao (young)	Jiang Changyang	Known as the Flower and Bird Envoy, he serves as the Junior Secretary of the Guanglu Temple and is a close minister to Emperor Xuanzong of Tang. Though outwardly carefree and uninhibited, he is kind-hearted and courageous, has strategic insight, and is loyal to his country and family. Having entered the imperial palace at a young age, he grew up alongside the emperor, earning his trust and working secretly to eliminate corrupt officials within the court by pretending to be corrupt himself. After encountering He Weifang in Luoyang, he becomes intrigued by her personality and circumstances. Initially assisting her out of curiosity, he develops genuine affection for her. He later marries He Weifang and becomes an investor in her business ventures in Chang'an.

=== Supporting ===
Actor	Character	Introduction
Wei Zheming	Liu Chang	Former husband of He Weifang and a proud and rigid scholar. He resents He Weifang for separating him from Li Youzhen and treats her coldly after their marriage. His attitude gradually changes as he recognizes her resilience and kindness. He marries Li Youzhen after his divorce and advances in the bureaucracy by aligning himself with Prince Ning. Known for his strategic thinking, he repeatedly advises the prince but his plans often fail, reducing him to a political pawn. As Prince Ning's defeat becomes inevitable, Liu Chang betrays him to save himself.
Zhang Yaqin	Li Youzhen	Princess Ji'an, daughter of Prince Ning. Willful, capricious and jealous, she uses coercive means to obtain what she wants. She loves Liu Chang but her father forces her to marry another man. After her husband's death, she attempts to rekindle her relationship with Liu Chang and marries him after his divorce but her domineering behavior repels him. Jealous, she repeatedly targets He Weifang and during an attempt to humiliate her at a horse farm, she is accidentally trampled on and loses her fertility.
Tu Songyan	Prince Ning	A member of the imperial family. Ambitious, treacherous, deceitful and outwardly loyal to the emperor, he secretly consolidates power by hoarding weapons, forming alliances with court officials and plotting rebellion. To remove obstacles, he repeatedly frames loyal ministers and eliminates dissenters. At the height of his influence, he coerces the emperor and controls key aspects of the court. However, his schemes fail due to the efforts of Jiang Changyang, He Weifang and their allies.
Qu Zheming	Emperor Xuanzong of Tang	The reigning emperor. With the alias 3rd Young Master, he travels incognito accompanied by Jiang Changyang. Despite his anonymous appearance, he retains his authority and identity as the emperor, using these journeys to gain insight into the conditions of his subjects and the actions of the officials.
Shen Mengchen	Huangfu Lingge	The Pure Consort. One of the emperor's consorts. Beautiful and intelligent.
Tong Mengshi	Li Xing	He Weifang's cousin and a loyal minister of the emperor. He used to like He Weifang.
Dong Jie	Aunt Feng	Jiang Changyang's aunt
Shao Yun	Qin Shengyi	Wang Qing's wife. She assisted He Weifang to escape Wang Qing's coercion. After her divorce, she becomes He Weifang's business partner. Tricked into remarrying Wang Qing, she kills him and herself during a confrontation.
Xin Peng	Wang Qing	Qin Shengyi's abusive husband and a tavern owner. He made trouble for He Weifang. Qin Shengyi killed him after he tricked her into remarrying him.
Yang Kun	Aunt Sun	She was sent to He Weifang and Qin Shengyi by Wang Qing to make trouble. But she joins them in the business.
Guan Le	Zhu Fu	Strong and sensible, she uses her skill to make perfume powder to collaborate with He Weifang.
Sun Meilin	Lü Gengchun	Daughter of the head of the "Hua Xing Lü". Secretly practiced medicine to help people. Later sided with He Weifang's.
Zhang Qi	Xu Zuping	Teacher of the Emperor and Jiang Changyang. Prince Ning ordered his assassination. But Jiang Changyang faked his death and saved him.
Xu Lingyue	Xiao Xuexi	Daughter of General Xiao and Jiang Changyang's childhood friend
Zhang Lei	Father Liu	Liu Chang's father
Hao Wenting	Mother Liu	Liu Chang's mother
Gu Zicheng	Qin Liulang	Qin Shenyi's brother; admirer of He Weifang
Yuan Ran	Madame He	He Weifang's mother
Chen Sisi	Aunt He	He Weifang's aunt
Liao Yinyue	Yu Lu	He Weifang's maid
Bao Chenxi	Lian Zhou	Jiang Changyang's concubine. She was tasked by Prince Ning to spy on Jiang Changyang.
Ma Yi	Cao Yuying	Deputy head of the flower business
Guo Zhe	Chuan Yu	Jiang Changyang's bodyguard
Zhou Pu	Uncle Wu	Manager of the private home for orphans which was opened by Jiang Changyang
Lin Zilu	Bi Yu	Li Youzhen's personal maid
Xie Xin	Madam Yun	Owner of Hua Yun Lou
Wang Tianyu	Qiu Shi	Liu Chang's guard
Mu Tong	She Yan	Emperor's bodyguard
Chen Yilong	Pei Zhong	
Kui Yuan	Ah Tao	
Hu Yiyan	Qing Que	
Ni Hanjin	Yu Zheng	
Gao Sheng	Ah Ci	

== Soundtrack ==
No.	Title	Lyrics	Music	Singer(s)	Length
1.	"Liu Fang (流芳)" (Theme Song)	Jin Dazhou; Wu Shuting	Jin Dazhou	Tan Weiwei	02:23
2.	"Bu Feng Bu Ruo (不逢不若)" (Interlude)	Wang Yuyan		Yang Zi	03:51
3.	"Ru Shuang (如霜)" (Interlude)	Zhang Pengpeng; Jin Dazhou	Jin Dazhou	Jam Hsiao	03:28
4.	"Qing Niao Gui (青鸟归)" (Interlude)	Zhang Pengpeng; Jin Dazhou	Jin Dazhou	Terry Lin	03:45
5.	"Yu Zhang Xing (豫章行)" (Interlude)	Fu Xuan	Wang Shimi	Guo Keyu
6.	"Fang Hua Yin (芳华吟)" (Ending Theme Song)	Wu Shuting; Jin Dazhou	Sun Aili	Zhang Zining	03:07
7.	"Song of the Sea of Cloud (云海长歌)" (Opening Theme)		Jin Dazhou

== Production ==
=== Development ===
The series is set in the Tang dynasty. In order to showcase the beauty of that era and recreate its grandeur, during the development period of the show, the production team collaborated with the Institute of History of the Chinese Academy of Social Sciences. They researched across various location and consulted more than twenty experts on the custom, culture, history and architecture of the Tang dynasty and peony-related knowledges.

=== Scriptwriting ===
The series is adapted from Yi Qianzhong's 2011 novel Flourished Peony. Many changes were made during the scriptwriting process, some of which are quite significant. Contents involving He Weifang's sickness and her marrying in the Liu family for a miraculous medicine were changed into her mother being sick and He Weifang marrying to obtain the medicine for her mother. Her conflicts with concubines in the Liu household were removed. The adaptation also made changes in the relationship dynamics between He Weifang and her family. In the novel, she has a close relationship with her family and they supported her in every step including her divorce and starting her own business. But in the series, He Weifang's father is indifferent toward her and doesn't help her during her critical moments. The screenwriter, Zhang Yuanang, also made changes in the character of the male lead and second male lead and merged several characters from the original work into roles. The male lead, Jiang Changyang, is an imperial strategist in the novel, handling dangerous matters. While in the series, he is changed to a flower and bird envoy. His calm and expressionless personality was changed into animated, shrewd and quick-witted. The second male lead Liu Chang is a complete wastrel in the novel. In the series, he is characterized as ambitious and aspiring but weak-willed and subservient to his parents. Screenwriter Zhang Yuanang stated in an interview that she wanted to portray the protagonists as emotionally mature and independent individuals. She explained that both He Weifang and Jiang Changyang are people who endured cruelties of life. Their relationship starts after knowing and understanding each other and develops gradually. The character Qin Shengyi received particular attention from the screenwriter Zhang.

=== Costumes, makeup and props ===
The production team researched extensively to depict the cultural richness and visual splendor of Tang dynasty accurately and chose the colorful and mottled patterns of Sancai ceramics as the main visual concept for the entire series. About 1,500 costumes were made for the production. Each design was influenced by various Tang dynasty paintings, murals and artifacts sourced from major museums across China. For example, the wedding crown Jiang Changyang gave to He Weifang to wear at their wedding was made based on the "Six-flowered Hairpin Crown" worn by Lady Pei, the wife of Yan Shiwei from the Wu Zhou period. It took more than a month to completely make the crown. The necklace and headdress worn by Li Youzhen during her wedding were inspired by two artifacts excavated from the tombs of Li Jingxun and Princess Li Bian. The "Peacock Crown" worn by a dancer in one scene was based on a Tang dynasty figurine of a woman riding a horse and playing a waist drum exhibited in the Xi'an Museum.

Many of the props and costume elements in the series were inspired from actual Tang dynasty relics. A silver sachet worn by Jiang Changyang was modeled after a silver incense burner with grape and bird design held in the Shaanxi History Museum. Another celadon octagonal vase was based on a famous Tang dynasty artifact. The design of the bedding featured in the series was inspired by a national first-class cultural relic, a light yellow silk quilt embroidered with dragon and phoenix patterns, collected by the Jingzhou Museum in Hubei Province. Hairstyling in the series also drew inspiration from historical sources. Many of the hairstyles worn by female characters were based on Tang dynasty female figurines displayed at the Xi'an Museum.

The winged horse and beaded pattern on Jiang Changyang's red round-necked robe is a major highlight of the series. This pattern originated in Greek, Persian and Central Asian cultures and entered the Central Plains via the Silk Road. It was localized by Tang dynasty artisans and became an important decorative element in Tang clothing. Another blue round-necked robe worn by Jiang Changyang was based on the "Lingyang Gongyang" design. The main pattern being a pair of birds in a round nest, combined with the Sasanian robin motif replicated the style of Tang dynasty mandarin duck and flower brocade. The costumes of He Weifang mostly focuses on floral patterns, especially on peony embroidery. Her costumes combine garments with rich color with traditional needlework creating embroidery with lifelike appearances. The series also features costumes with tie-dyeing, batik, and other dyeing techniques on several occasions.

Makeup styles in Tang dynasty were very diverse. "Whiteness is beauty", was the aesthetic of that period. So Tang women sought foundation with a fair, matte complexion. Eyebrows were painted in the form of moths, willow leaves or water sway with soft and graceful curves. In the series, the characters sport a clear, white and natural base makeup. He Weifang's eyebrows were styled like a crescent moon with slightly upturned ends. Eye makeup were done with reddish-brown tones and thin, slightly upturned eyeliner. Cherry blossom lips and petal-shaped lips was used as the lip makeup. Huadian (forehead flowers or dimple makeup) was one of the most distinct feature of Tang dynasty makeup style and was featured in the series. Huadian is a form of traditional Chinese women's ornamental forehead makeup, which is located between the eyebrows and sometimes on the cheeks, the temples and the dimples. It was often shaped like hearts, circles, diamonds, small birds and small fishes. Influenced by the Confucian concept that "Our bodies, hair and skin are received from our parents", Han Chinese women in Tang dynasty generally did not pierce their ears and did not wear earrings. None of the female characters in the series wore earrings either.

Hand fan serves as a cultural symbol in the series. After researching, the production team designed a variety of fans with individual character traits. He Weifang holding a round fan as she marries Liu Chang alludes to the Tang dynasty wedding tradition of "The fan-removing ceremony". But unlike traditional wedding fans with landscape paintings or auspicious patterns, her fan depicts a woman planting peonies, referencing the gathering of female immortals in the painting "The Southern Tang Dynasty Fairy Gathering". The round fan Jiang Changyang is seen with is modeled after Tang palace fans depicted in the painting "Jade Hall of Wealth and Prosperity" and was crafted with an ivory openwork frame and a printed silk surface decorated with cloud and floral motifs. The feather fan he used was made from goose feathers. It was based on the depictions found in the Song dynasty painting "Elegant Gathering at the Western Garden".

=== Peony ===
As the core visual element, many peonies were used during filming. The Heze Municipal Bureau of Culture and Tourism invited Huace Media to Heze for an on-site inspection and symposium. After reaching an agreement, the Heze Municipal Bureau of Culture and Tourism coordinated with the Mudan district to sponsor peonies needed for the filming of the series and Heze city became the official peony sponsor. The production team overcame weather conditions and developed a method for supplying flowers across regions, ensuring the crew could use fresh peonies to meet the filming needs. Heze city donated a total of 2,570 pots of flowers including 28 varieties of peonies and 8 varieties of herbaceous peonies. Most of them were cultivated in Heze including the variety "Lu Mu Yin Yu" which became the prototype of the "Qiong Tai Yu Lu" peony featured in the series. They also assigned the crew with technical personnel to provide support during filming. Luoyang city provided the crew with 12,000 peony and peony plants.

=== Location and set design ===
The filming of the series began in Hengdian World Studios. Some of the filming also took place at the Shengshi Tangcheng Scenic Area in Xiangyang, where the largest Tang-style architectural complex in China is situated. In order to show the culture and lifestyle of Tang Society, the production team designed and built hundreds of buildings. Then the crew moved to Laoling Film Studio and about 90% of the show was filmed there. The four architectural complexes in the main scenes of the show including mansions, gardens, streets, restaurants, waterways and docks were all designed and built by the production team.

=== Filming ===
The filming began on January 2, 2024, and wrapped up on July 25 of the same year. Both Flourished Peony and In the Name of Blossom were filmed together at the same time. Yang Zi and Li Xian acted in the lead roles. This series is their second on-screen collaboration following their 2019 hit television series Go Go Squid!.

== Reception ==
=== Viewership ===
Flourished Peony became the first ever TV series in Mango TV to exceed 6 million in reservations. It is the series with the most investment in the history of Hunan Television and Mango TV, securing 40 brand partners prior to its premiere. It became the TV series with the highest average number of ads per episode across all platform, a record later surpassed by its second season In the Name of Blossom.

Since its premiere, the series's viewership has steadily increased, ranking first among provincial satellite TV channels in its time slot according to CSM average ratings. For several days, it topped the ratings and viewership charts on KuYun and Huanwang, also ranking first in both the TV drama ratings and the Yunhe charts. It garnered 6,743 trending topics across the internet; 4,212 being on Weibo. Its main Douyin hashtag reached 14.73 billion views with related hashtags reaching 29.6 billion views. It also dominated the data charts on various platforms such as Datawin, Maoyan, Vlinkage, Guduo, Lighthouse, and Blue Eagle. According to industry tracker Beacon, Flourished Peony topped the mainland China's daily viewership charts for 20 days during the Chinese New Year holiday. According to the 2025 CVB domestic TV drama viewership report released by the National Radio and Television Administration, Flourished Peony aired on Hunan TV during the Chinese New Year, with its premiere attracting 140 million viewers. Related topics on Weibo garnered over 9.7 billion reads, and the series ranked second in viewership among TV dramas on Mango TV in 2025.

The series topped the Maoyan online popularity chart within 20 minutes of its release, and remained there for 10 days. On the third day after its premiere, the series recorded over 100 million views on Maoyan across the entire network. It exceeded 1.5 billion effective playback volumes on Maoyan, surpassing 48 million views per episode during its peak run. It became the champion of Maoyan Drama Popularity Monthly Chart and Maoyan Drama Effective Views Monthly chart. During its peak broadcast period, the series achieved the highest Mango TV Kuyun on-demand average viewership and became the first Mango TV drama to surpass 20 million Kuyun views. It was also the first Mango TV series to exceed 30 million Kuyun views.

After six days of broadcast, the Yunhe market share of the series increased to 20.3%. It is the first Mango TV drama to surpass both 35 million and 40 million views on Yunhe. During its hot-broadcast period, the series reached 40.83 million views per episode on Yunhe, setting an all-time platform record. It also became the first Mango TV drama to surpass 50 million average views per episode on Yunhe. It accumulated 1.274 billion total views and an average of 39.23 million views per episode on Lighthouse. It ranked at No 1 among all costume dramas in average views, held the daily top 1 spot for 20 days and was recognized as a Lighthouse hit drama.

Flourished Peony is the first and only drama in 2025 to surpass 3 on the Datawin Index. It surpassed 2 a total of 27 times and exceeded 2.5 a total of 21 times. After 5 days of broadcast, total views exceeded 1 billion on Mango TV. The series accumulated over 4 billion views, averaging over 130 million views per episode, setting a record for Mango TV. It received a 7.8 rating on Douban, with over 340,000 viewers participating in the rating.

Flourished Peony premiered internationally on multiple platforms including Netflix, VIU, Viki, Line TV, MyVideo, Astro, K+, Vidio, TrueVisions and MOA. The release covered 80 countries and regions including the United States, France, Spain, Portugal, Italy, South Korea and Singapore. The series received a 9.8 rating on Rakuten Viki. In Vietnam, it reached the top position on the K+ platform in real-time views within two days of its premiere.

=== Impact ===
According to reports from numerous mainstream and financial media outlets, the immense success of Flourished Peony has directly boosted the "Peony Economy. After the series aired, peony sales surged in Heze city of Shandong province and Luoyang city of Henan province. Zhao Wenshuang, Secretary-General of the Heze Peony Industry Association and head of the Heze Flower King Industrial Park, stated in an interview, "The peak sales of peonies in Heze arrived three days earlier this year, with sales increasing by one-third compared to the same period last year". Luoyang's traditional Chinese pastry, "Peony Flower Pastry," has also become incredibly popular. The series also boosted local cultural tourism. During the broadcast, offline activities such as a Flourished Peony themed light show at Yingtian Gate in Luoyang, Henan and a Flourished Peony themed garden party in Nanyue Lane, Hengyang, Hunan attracted a large number of tourists. Replicas of the flower garden "Hua Man Zhu" from the television series was featured in the Peony Festival in Taiyanggong Park, Chaoyang, Beijing. Another Flourished Peony themed flower exhibition was held at Kunming, Yunnan during the Spring Festival holiday. The series, along with the film Detective Chinatown 1900, also attracted visitors to Laoling Film Studio in Shandong.

The Arabic version of the series was presented as a diplomatic gift to Egypt and the United Arab Emirates, while Hungarian National Television signed a contract to broadcast the series. According to informations from Mango TV's Spring Investment Promotion Conference in May, Flourished Peony directly boosted Mango TV's user base by 42.7% and its membership conversion rate reached a record high.

=== Ratings ===
Flourished Peony achieved a peak viewership rating of 0.7928% on Hunan Television, ranking first among provincial satellite TV stations in the same time slot. The series achieved a 0.601% CSM average viewership rating and a 0.390% CVB rating, ranking first among local satellite TV dramas during prime time, accumulating 140 million viewers during its initial run. It was later broadcast on Shandong Television. According to statistics from CVB National Network, the highest single-episode rating for Flourished Peony during its run on Shandong TV was 0.219%, ranking among the top 4 highest-rated prime-time dramas of that day. According to statistics from CVB Shandong Province, the entire series achieved a 1.575% average viewership rating, ranking first among provincial satellite channels during the same period, reaching an effective audience of 40.623 million.

Hunan TV CSM National Network ratings & CVB ratings
	CSM Ratings (%)	CVB (%)	Notes
Average ratings	0.601	0.390	

== Accolades ==
Year	Award	Category	Nominee(s)	Result	Ref.
2025	Film and Television Role Models 2024 Overall Ranking	Most Anticipated TV Series of the Year	Flourished Peony	Won	
2025	China Literature IP Ceremony	Most Popular IP Adaptation of the Year	Flourished Peony	Won	
2025	Beijing Spring Fair for Audiovisual Programs	TV Series of the Year	Flourished Peony	Won	
2025	Beijing Spring Fair for Audiovisual Programs	Outstanding Director of the Year	Ding Ziguang	Won	
2025	5th New Era International Television Festival	Breakthrough Actor of the New Era	Tu Songyan	Nominated	
2025	5th New Era International Television Festival	Powerful Actress of the New Era	Dong Jie	Nominated	
2025	5th New Era International Television Festival	Best Producer of the New Era	Zhang Zhuo, Ren Xu, Zhou Wei	Nominated	
2025	30th Shanghai Television Festival	Best Actress	Yang Zi	Nominated	
2025	30th Shanghai Television Festival	Ambassador for Overseas Promotion of Chinese TV Programs	Yang Zi	Won	
2025	30th Shanghai Television Festival	Best Art Direction	Shao Changyong, Zhu Hanbing, Zhang Chen	Won	
2025	5th Golden Pen Screenwriter Night	Most Influential Screenplay	Flourished Peony	Finalist	
2025	Weibo Tourism Night	Weibo Cultural Tourism Communication Contribution IP	Flourished Peony	Won	
2025	2nd Golden Panda Award	Best Drama Series	Flourished Peony	Nominated	
2025	8th True Aspiration Award	Outstanding TV Series	Flourished Peony	Won	
2025	China Content Marketing Award	Most Commercially Valuable TV Series	Flourished Peony	Won	
2025	16th Tiger Roar Award	Silver Award for Joint Marketing	Flourished Peony	Won	
2025	China Radio and Television Audiovisual Masterpiece Night	Top 10 Recommendation	Flourished Peony	Won	
2025	Weibo TV & Internet Video Summit	Quality Drama of the Year	Flourished Peony	Won	
2025	Weibo TV & Internet Video Summit	Outstanding Producer of the Year	Zhang Zhuo	Won	
2025	Weibo TV & Internet Video Summit	Outstanding IP Adaptation of the Year	Flourished Peony	Won	
2025	21st Chinese American TV Festival	Top 10 TV Series	Flourished Peony	Won	
2025	16th Macau International Television Festival	Best Cinematography	Zhen Yu	Nominated	
2026	Film and Television Role Models 2025 Overall Ranking	Popular TV Series of the Year	Flourished Peony	Won	
2026	Kuyun Digital Entertainment Annual Influence Ceremony	Most Popular Drama of the Year	Flourished Peony	Won	
2026	Kuyun Digital Entertainment Annual Influence Ceremony	TV Series of the Year (Satellite channel)	Flourished Peony	Won	
2026	Kuyun Digital Entertainment Annual Influence Ceremony	Most Influential Director of the Year	Ding Ziguang	Won	
2026	2nd China TV Drama Production Industry Conference Annual Ceremony	Actress of the Year	Yang Zi	Nominated	
2026	2nd China TV Drama Production Industry Conference Annual Ceremony	Most Popular Actor of the Year	Li Xian	Nominated	
2026	2nd China TV Drama Production Industry Conference Annual Ceremony	Art Direction of the Year	Shao Changyong	Won	
2026	2nd China TV Drama Production Industry Conference Annual Ceremony	Costume Design of the Year	Chen Tongxun	Won	
2026	33rd China TV Golden Eagle Awards	Best TV Series	Flourished Peony	Nominated	
2026	Golden Eagle TV Producer Annual Influence Ceremony	Most Influential Producer	Zhang Zhuo	Won	
2026	35th Flying Apsaras Awards	Outstanding Television Series	Flourished Peony	Won	
