= Zhuji, Laoling =

Zhuji 朱集镇
- Town
- Location in Shandong Zhuji (China)
- Coordinates: 37°47′04″N 117°15′57″E
- Country: People's Republic of China
- Province: Shandong
- Prefecture-level city: Dezhou
- County-level city: Laoling
- Time zone: UTC+8 (China Standard)

Zhuji (Chinese: 朱集镇) is a town in Laoling, Dezhou, in northwestern Shandong province, China.
