= Hualou =

Hualou 化楼镇
- Town
- Location in Shandong Hualou (China)
- Coordinates: 37°33′31″N 117°00′44″E
- Country: People's Republic of China
- Province: Shandong
- Prefecture-level city: Dezhou
- County-level city: Laoling
- Time zone: UTC+8 (China Standard)

Hualou (Chinese: 化楼镇) is a town in Laoling, Dezhou, in northwestern Shandong province, China.
