= Yang'an, Shandong =

Yang'an 杨安镇
- Town
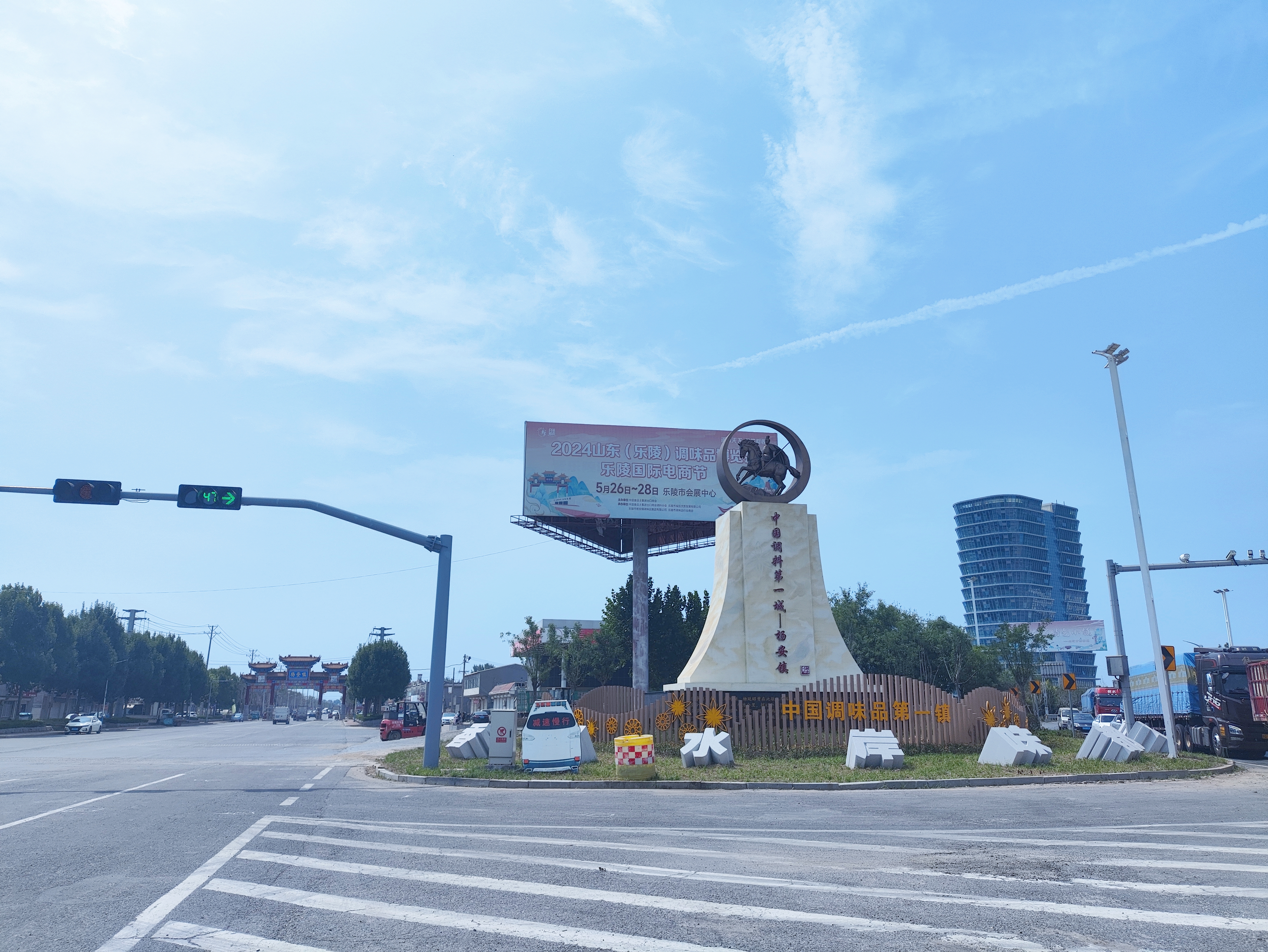
- North of Yang'an

- Location in Shandong Yang'an (China)
- Coordinates: 37°39′00″N 117°09′45″E
- Country: People's Republic of China
- Province: Shandong
- Prefecture-level city: Dezhou
- County-level city: Laoling
- Time zone: UTC+8 (China Standard)

Yang'an (Chinese: 杨安镇) is a town in Laoling, Dezhou, in northwestern Shandong province, China.

Yang'an is famous for its seasoning industry, It is one of the largest seasoning production centers in China. Yang'an is known as China's number one seasoning city.
