= Kong, Shandong =

Kong 孔镇
- Town
- Location in Shandong Kong (China)
- Coordinates: 37°34′44″N 117°00′39″E
- Country: People's Republic of China
- Province: Shandong
- Prefecture-level city: Dezhou
- County-level city: Laoling
- Time zone: UTC+8 (China Standard)

Kong (Chinese: 孔镇) is a town in Laoling, Dezhou, in northwestern Shandong province, China.
