= Huayuan, Laoling =

Huayuan 花园镇
- Town
- Location in Shandong Huayuan (China)
- Coordinates: 37°35′29″N 117°12′25″E
- Country: People's Republic of China
- Province: Shandong
- Prefecture-level city: Dezhou
- County-level city: Laoling
- Time zone: UTC+8 (China Standard)

Huayuan (Chinese: 花园镇) is a town in Laoling, Dezhou, in northwestern Shandong province, China.
