= Dingwu =

Dingwu 丁坞镇
- Town
- Location in Shandong Dingwu (China)
- Coordinates: 37°42′25″N 117°04′59″E
- Country: People's Republic of China
- Province: Shandong
- Prefecture-level city: Dezhou
- County-level city: Laoling
- Time zone: UTC+8 (China Standard)

Dingwu (Chinese: 丁坞镇) is a town in Laoling, Dezhou, in northwestern Shandong province, China.
