= Laoling Film Studio =

Chinese film studio

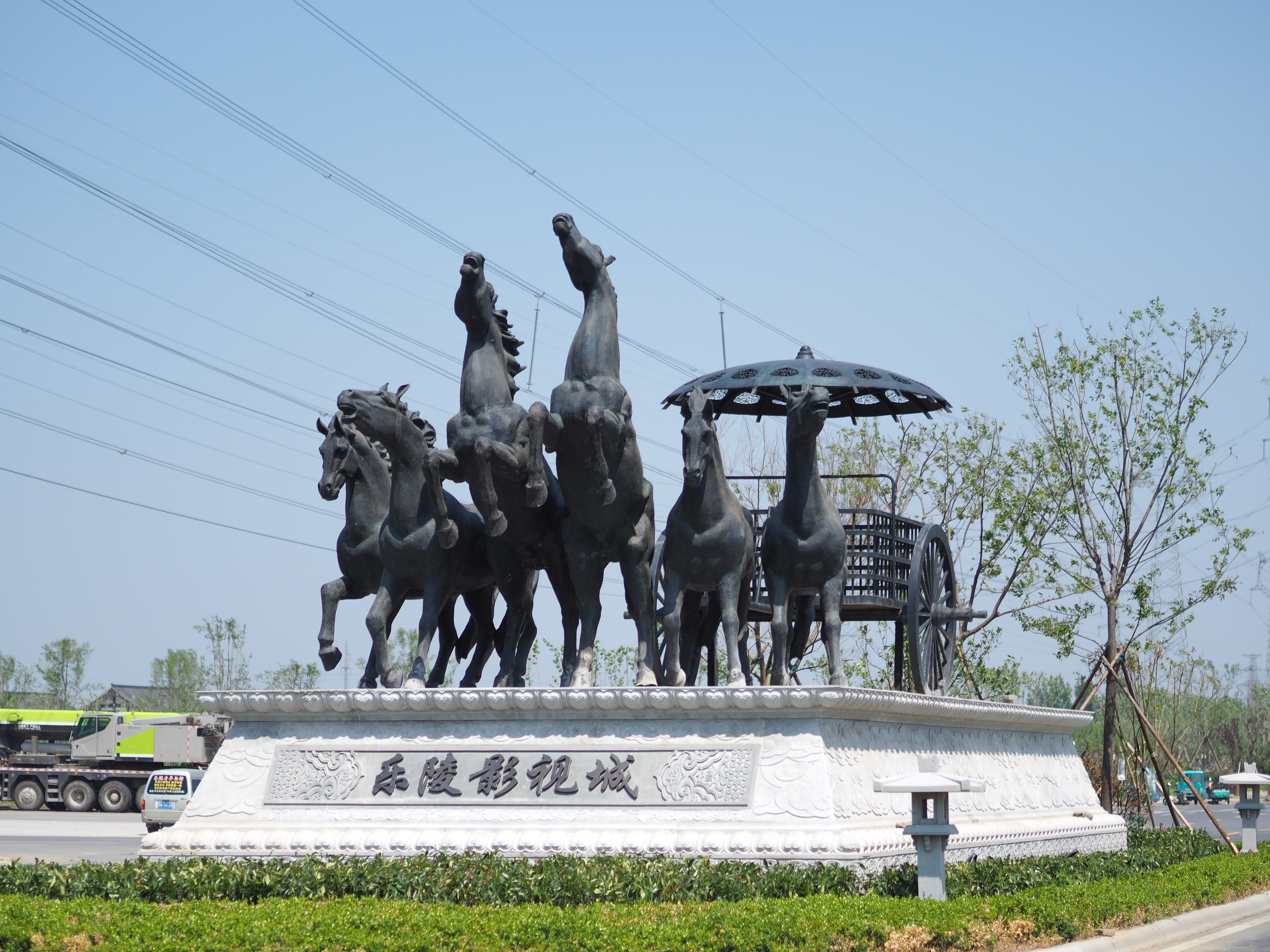
- Interactive map of Laoling Film Studio
- Location: Laoling, Shandong, China
- Coordinates: 37°45′21″N 117°14′58″E
- Status: Operating
- Opened: January 1, 2024; 2 years ago
- Owner: Wending Xingrui (Laoling) Cultural Media Co., Ltd.
- Theme: Film Studios and Theme Parks
- Website: cinemacity.wendingproperty.com

Laoling Film Studio
- Simplified Chinese: 乐陵影视城
- Traditional Chinese: 樂陵影視城
Transcriptions
Standard Mandarin
- Hanyu Pinyin: Làolíng Yǐngshì Chéng

Laoling Film Studio (Chinese: 乐陵影视城) is a film studio located in Laoling, Shandong, China. It has an area of about 3.556-square-kilometre (1.373 sq mi) and is the largest cultural, educational, film and television base in north China.

== History ==
Laoling Film Studio was founded on 1 January 2024. Flourished Peony is the first television series shoot in Laoling Film Studio. From August 12 to 18, 2024, Laoling Film Studio opened to the public for a limited time and free of charge for the first time.

== Film and television series ==
=== Film ===
- Detective Chinatown 1900

=== Television series ===
- Flourished Peony
