= Huangjia, Shandong =

Huangjia 黄夹镇
- Town
- Location in Shandong Huangjia (China)
- Coordinates: 37°46′05″N 117°05′14″E
- Country: People's Republic of China
- Province: Shandong
- Prefecture-level city: Dezhou
- County-level city: Laoling
- Elevation: 15 m (49 ft)
- Time zone: UTC+8 (China Standard)
- Area code: 0534

Huangjia (simplified Chinese: 黄夹; traditional Chinese: 黃夾; pinyin: Huángjiá) is a town under the administration of Laoling City in northwestern Shandong province, China, located about 9 kilometres (5.6 mi) south of the border with Hebei and 12 km (7.5 mi) north-northwest of downtown Laoling. As of 2011, it has 54 villages under its administration.

== See also ==
- List of township-level divisions of Shandong
