= Zhengdian, Shandong =

Zhengdian 郑店镇
- Town
- Location in Shandong Zhengdian (China)
- Coordinates: 37°30′06″N 117°08′12″E
- Country: People's Republic of China
- Province: Shandong
- Prefecture-level city: Dezhou
- County-level city: Laoling
- Time zone: UTC+8 (China Standard)

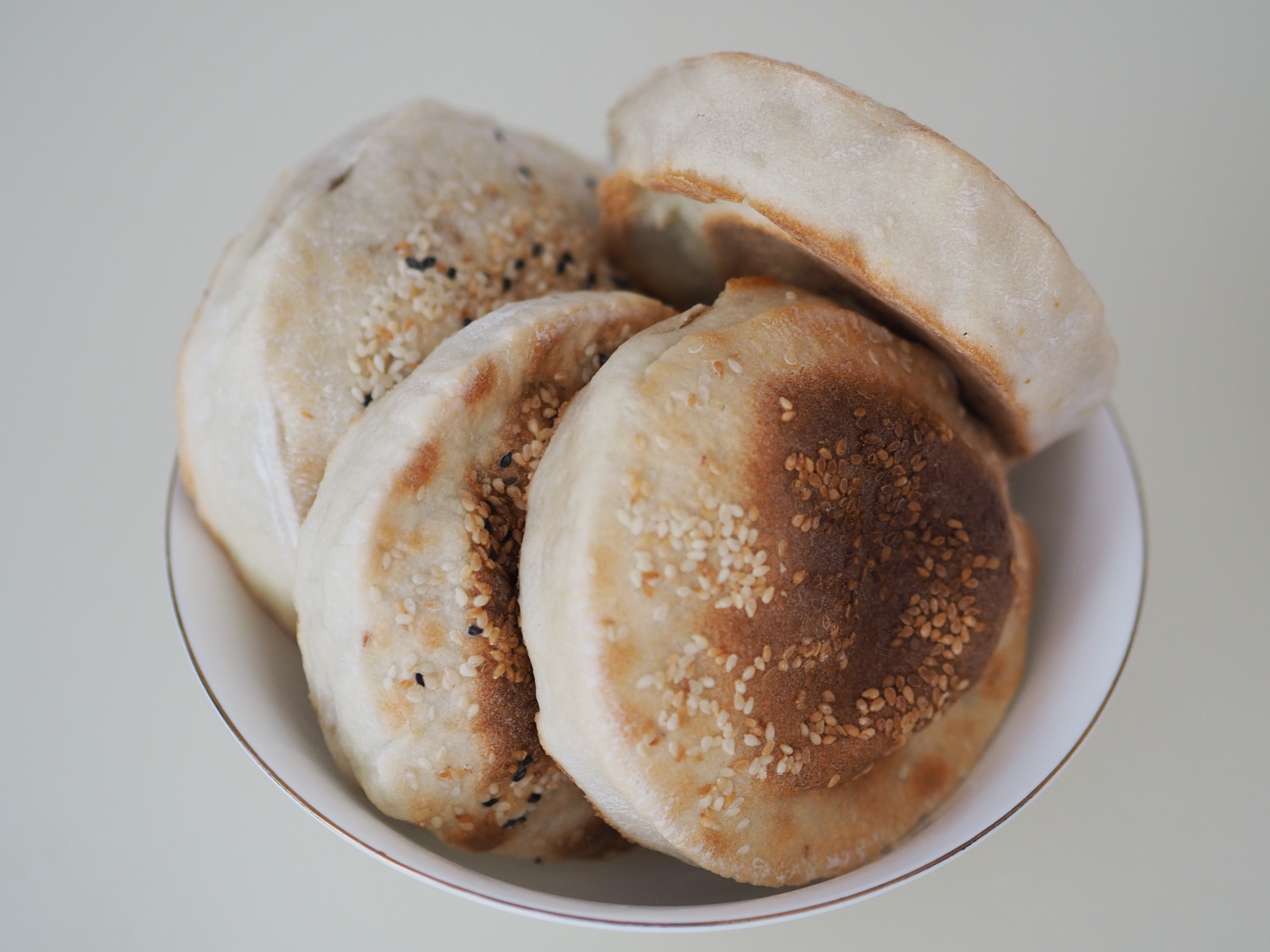
Zhengdian Mati Shaobing

Zhengdian (Chinese: 郑店) is a town in Laoling, Dezhou, in northwestern Shandong province, China. As of 2018, it has 115 villages under its administration.

Local food Mati Shaobing（Horseshoe-shaped shaobing） is famous.

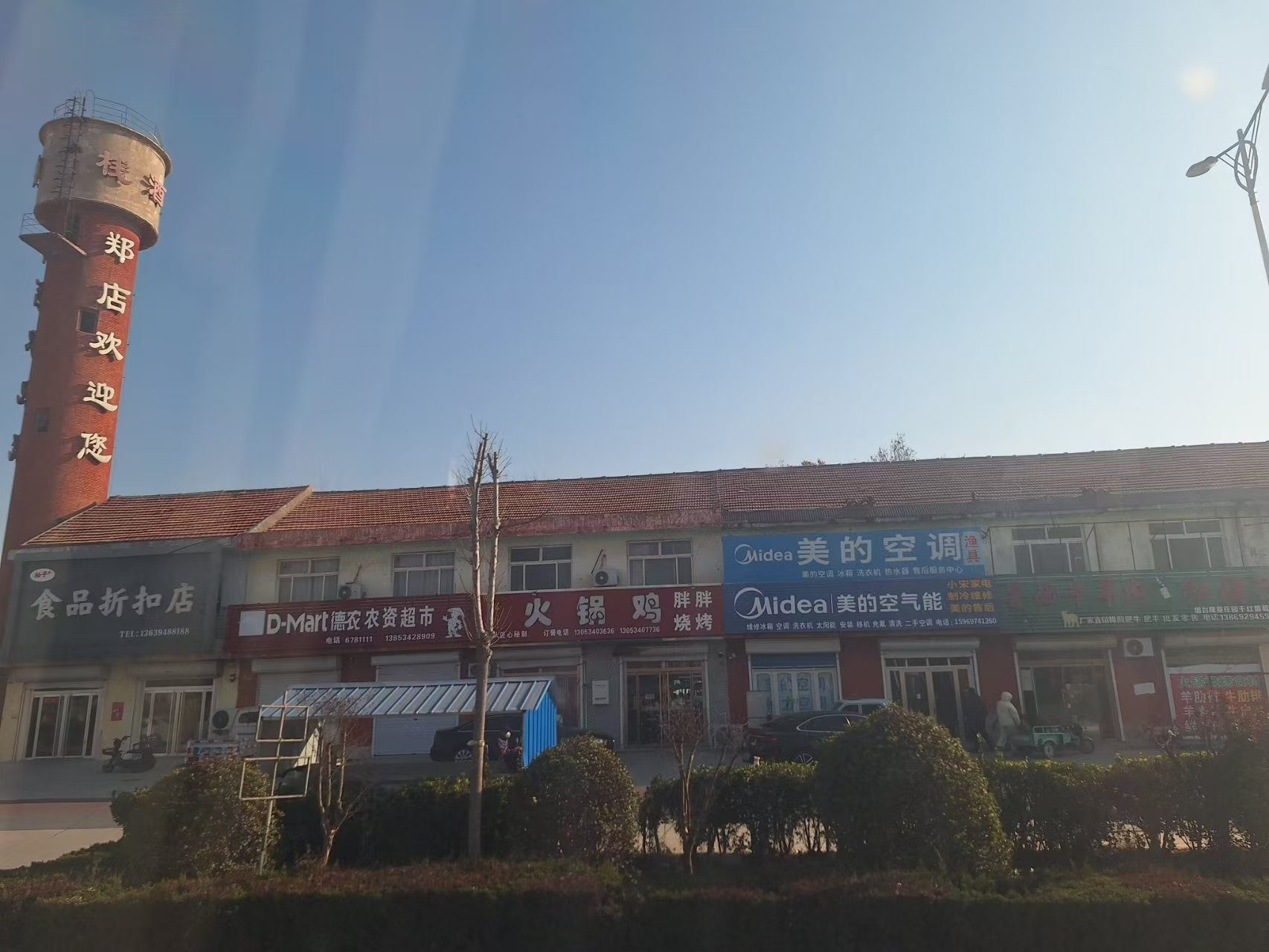
Zhengdian
