= Zizyberenalic acid =

Names
- IUPAC name (1R,2R,5S,8R,14S,18S)-15-formyl-1,2,14,17,17-pentamethyl-8-prop-1-en-2-ylpentacyclo[11.7.0.02,10.05,9.014,18]icos-15-ene-5-carboxylic acid

Identifiers
3D model (JSmol)	Interactive image
ChemSpider	13100081
PubChem CID	15958448
- InChI: InChI=1S/C30H44O3/c1-18(2)20-10-13-30(25(32)33)15-14-27(5)21(24(20)30)8-9-23-28(27,6)12-11-22-26(3,4)16-19(17-31)29(22,23)7/h16-17,20-24H,1,8-15H2,2-7H3,(H,32,33)/t20-,21?,22-,23?,24?,27+,28+,29-,30-/m0/s1 Key: GUPQNHIGLNUBOG-HYYJCJJOSA-N
- SMILES: CC(=C)[C@@H]1CC[C@]2(C1C3CCC4[C@]([C@@]3(CC2)C)(CC[C@@H]5[C@@]4(C(=CC5(C)C)C=O)C)C)C(=O)O

Properties
Chemical formula	C_{30}H_{44}O_{3}
Molar mass	452.679 g·mol^{−1}
Solubility in water	soluble
- Except where otherwise noted, data are given for materials in their standard state (at 25 °C [77 °F], 100 kPa). (what is ?) Infobox references

Zizyberenalic acid is a naturally occurring organic compound classified as a triterpenoid—a subclass of terpenoids notable for their complex multi-ring structures. The acid has the molecular formula C_{30}H_{44}O_{3}. The compound is characterized by a pentacyclic ring system with multiple methyl groups and a carboxylic acid functional group, as well as an aldehyde moiety.

== Natural occurrence ==
Zizyberenalic acid has been isolated from plants belonging to the genus Ziziphus, notably Ziziphus jujuba (commonly known as jujube). The acid is also reported in related species such as Breynia fruticosa, Paliurus hemsleyanus, and Ziziphus mauritiana. These plants belong to the family Rhamnaceae and are known for their traditional medicinal applications.

== Uses ==
While specific biological activities of zizyberenalic acid are still under study, triterpenoids broadly exhibit a variety of pharmacological properties, including anti-inflammatory, antiviral, and anticancer actions.
