= Qi River =

River in Hunan, China

Coordinates: 26°35′24″N 111°52′04″E

The Qi River (Chinese: 祁水) is a left-bank tributary of the middle Xiang River, one of main tributaries of the Xiang in Hunan Province. It rises in the Siming Mountains (Chinese: 四明山) of Qidong County. Its main stream runs generally northwest to southeast through Shaoyang, Qidong and Qiyang counties, and it joins the Xiang in the west of Shuifumiao (Chinese: 水府庙) of Qiyang. The Qi River has a length of 114 kilometres (71 mi), with its tributaries, and has a drainage-basin area of 1,685 square kilometres (651 sq mi).
