= Laoling =

Laoling 乐陵市 Loling
- County-level city
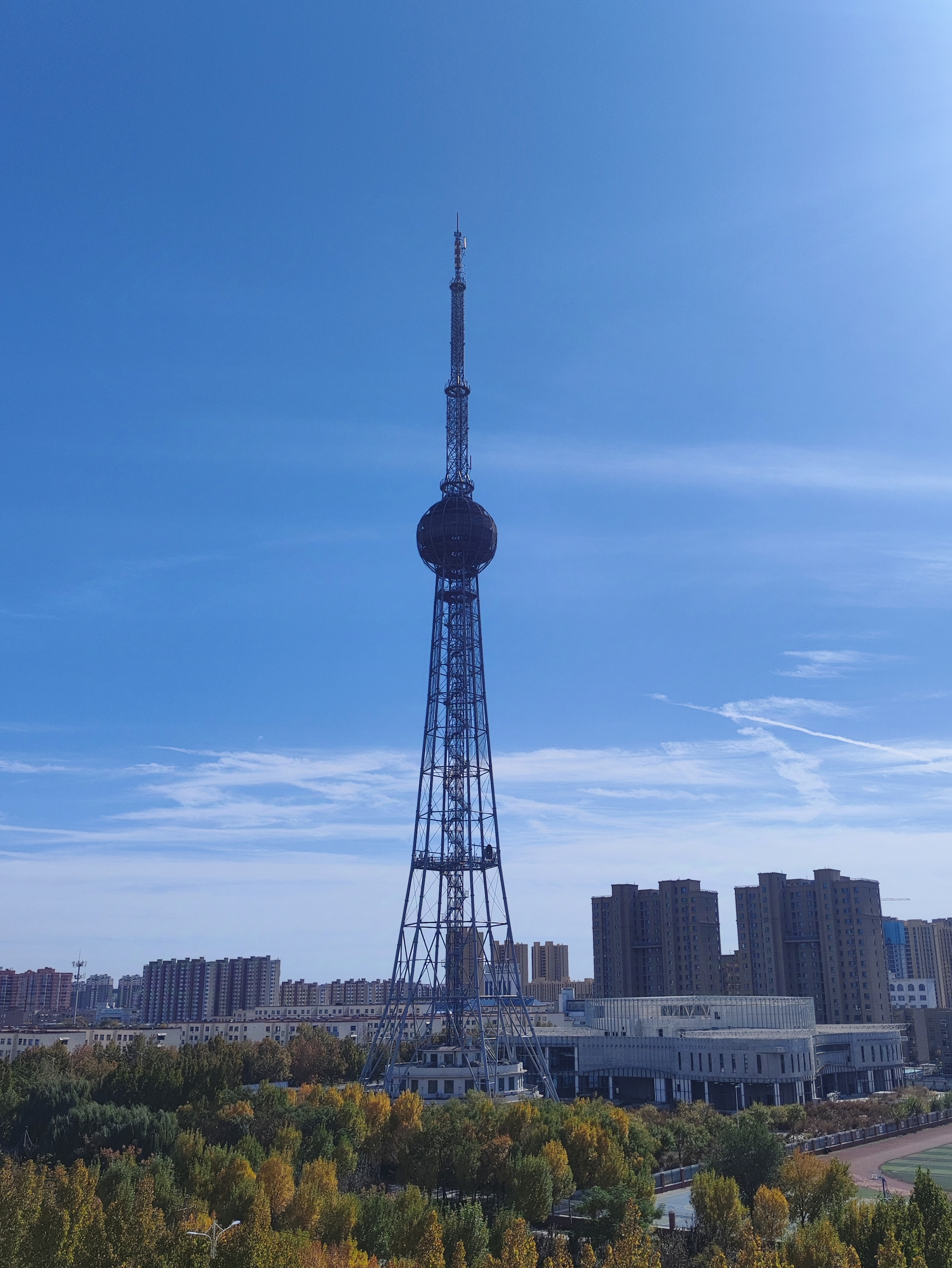
- Laoling TV tower in 2024

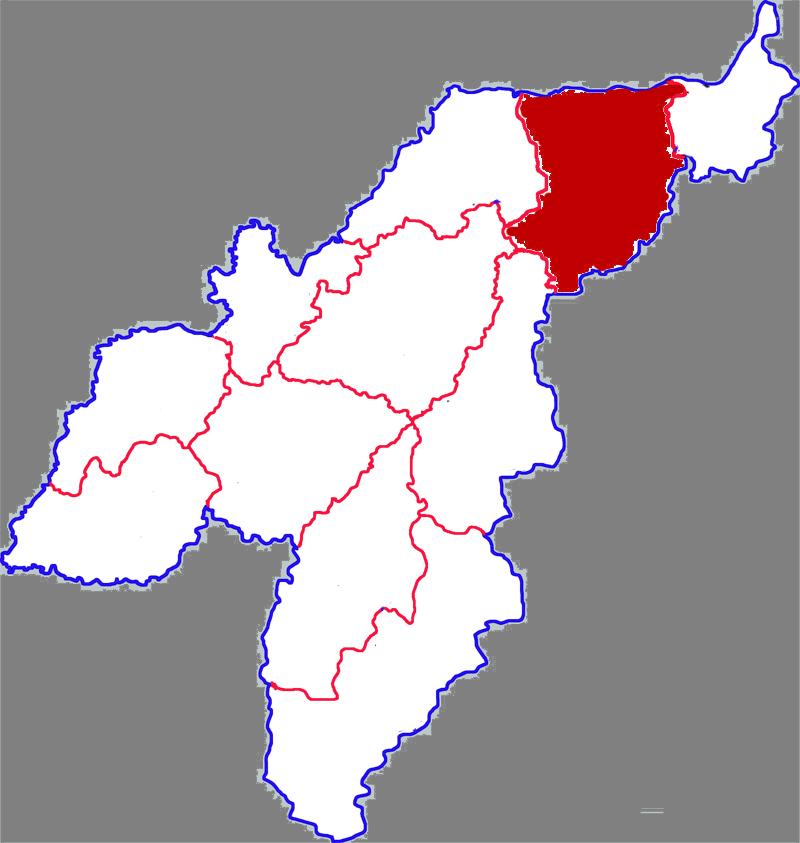
- Laoling in Dezhou

- Location of the city center in Shandong
- Coordinates: 37°43′48″N 117°13′55″E
- Country: People's Republic of China
- Province: Shandong
- Prefecture-level city: Dezhou

Area
  - Total: 1,173 km^{2} (453 sq mi)

Population (2019)
  - Total: 676,000
- Time zone: UTC+8 (China Standard)
- Postal code: 253600

Laoling (simplified Chinese: 乐陵; traditional Chinese: 樂陵; pinyin: Làolíng), often mispronounced as Leling, is a county-level city in the northwest of Shandong province, China, bordering Hebei province to the north. Laoling has more than 640,000 inhabitants (1999) and is under the jurisdiction of Dezhou City.

== Administrative divisions ==
As of 2012, this city is divided to 4 subdistricts, 8 towns and 4 townships.

Subdistricts

- Shizhong Subdistrict (市中街道)
- Hujia Subdistrict (胡家街道)
- Yunhong Subdistrict (云红街道)
- Guojia Subdistrict (郭家街道)

Towns

- Yang'an (杨安镇)
- Zhuji (朱集镇)
- Huangjia (黄夹镇)
- Dingwu (丁坞镇)
- Huayuan (花园镇)
- Zhengdian (郑店镇)
- Hualou (化楼镇)
- Kong (孔镇)

Townships

- Xiduan Township (西段乡)
- Dasun Township (大孙乡)
- Tieying Township (铁营乡)
- Zhaitoubao Township (寨头堡乡)

== Climate ==
Climate data for Laoling, elevation 12 m (39 ft), (1991–2020 normals, extremes 1991–present)
Month	Jan	Feb	Mar	Apr	May	Jun	Jul	Aug	Sep	Oct	Nov	Dec	Year
Record high °C (°F)	17.1 (62.8)	22.4 (72.3)	29.9 (85.8)	32.7 (90.9)	37.7 (99.9)	40.7 (105.3)	40.2 (104.4)	36.2 (97.2)	34.9 (94.8)	31.6 (88.9)	25.9 (78.6)	15.3 (59.5)	40.7 (105.3)
Mean daily maximum °C (°F)	3.1 (37.6)	7.0 (44.6)	13.7 (56.7)	20.6 (69.1)	26.4 (79.5)	31.4 (88.5)	32.0 (89.6)	30.3 (86.5)	26.9 (80.4)	20.7 (69.3)	11.8 (53.2)	4.6 (40.3)	19.0 (66.3)
Daily mean °C (°F)	−3.1 (26.4)	0.5 (32.9)	7.1 (44.8)	14.1 (57.4)	20.1 (68.2)	25.1 (77.2)	27.0 (80.6)	25.5 (77.9)	20.8 (69.4)	14.1 (57.4)	5.8 (42.4)	−1.0 (30.2)	13.0 (55.4)
Mean daily minimum °C (°F)	−7.7 (18.1)	−4.4 (24.1)	1.6 (34.9)	8.2 (46.8)	14.0 (57.2)	19.3 (66.7)	22.7 (72.9)	21.5 (70.7)	15.7 (60.3)	8.7 (47.7)	1.1 (34.0)	−5.3 (22.5)	8.0 (46.3)
Record low °C (°F)	−21.7 (−7.1)	−15.7 (3.7)	−10.4 (13.3)	−3.0 (26.6)	2.5 (36.5)	8.9 (48.0)	16.5 (61.7)	12.9 (55.2)	4.4 (39.9)	−3.4 (25.9)	−13.2 (8.2)	−17.8 (0.0)	−21.7 (−7.1)
Average precipitation mm (inches)	3.1 (0.12)	8.2 (0.32)	8.7 (0.34)	25.8 (1.02)	42.5 (1.67)	82.1 (3.23)	173.2 (6.82)	142.5 (5.61)	39.0 (1.54)	28.0 (1.10)	17.3 (0.68)	3.8 (0.15)	574.2 (22.6)
Average precipitation days (≥ 0.1 mm)	1.7	2.6	2.7	5.1	5.7	7.9	11.3	9.8	5.8	5.0	3.6	2.3	63.5
Average snowy days	2.8	2.7	1.0	0.2	0	0	0	0	0	0	1.0	1.9	9.6
Average relative humidity (%)	61	57	53	58	64	64	77	83	76	69	67	65	66
Mean monthly sunshine hours	161.3	166.9	217.7	237.8	268.1	242.4	203.9	207.6	207.7	199.7	165.5	155.3	2,433.9
Percentage possible sunshine	53	54	58	60	61	55	46	50	56	58	55	52	55
Source: China Meteorological Administration

== Transport ==
Laoling has no train station or airport. The nearest train station is about 80 km away, and the nearest airport is about 110km away. However, there are many highways passing through Laoling, especially the famous G2 Beijing-Shanghai Expressway, which runs through Laoling, making Laoling a city with well-developed road transportation.

- Bus:
  - K912 Dezhou-Laoling bus system
  - Laoling Long-distance passenger transport center（乐陵长途客运中心）

== Industry ==
The main industries in Laoling include agricultural and sideline processing and seasoning industry, auto parts industry and sports equipment industry mainly led by Taishan Sports Group. In addition to traditional industries, there are also cultural industries such as film and television bases.

== Food ==
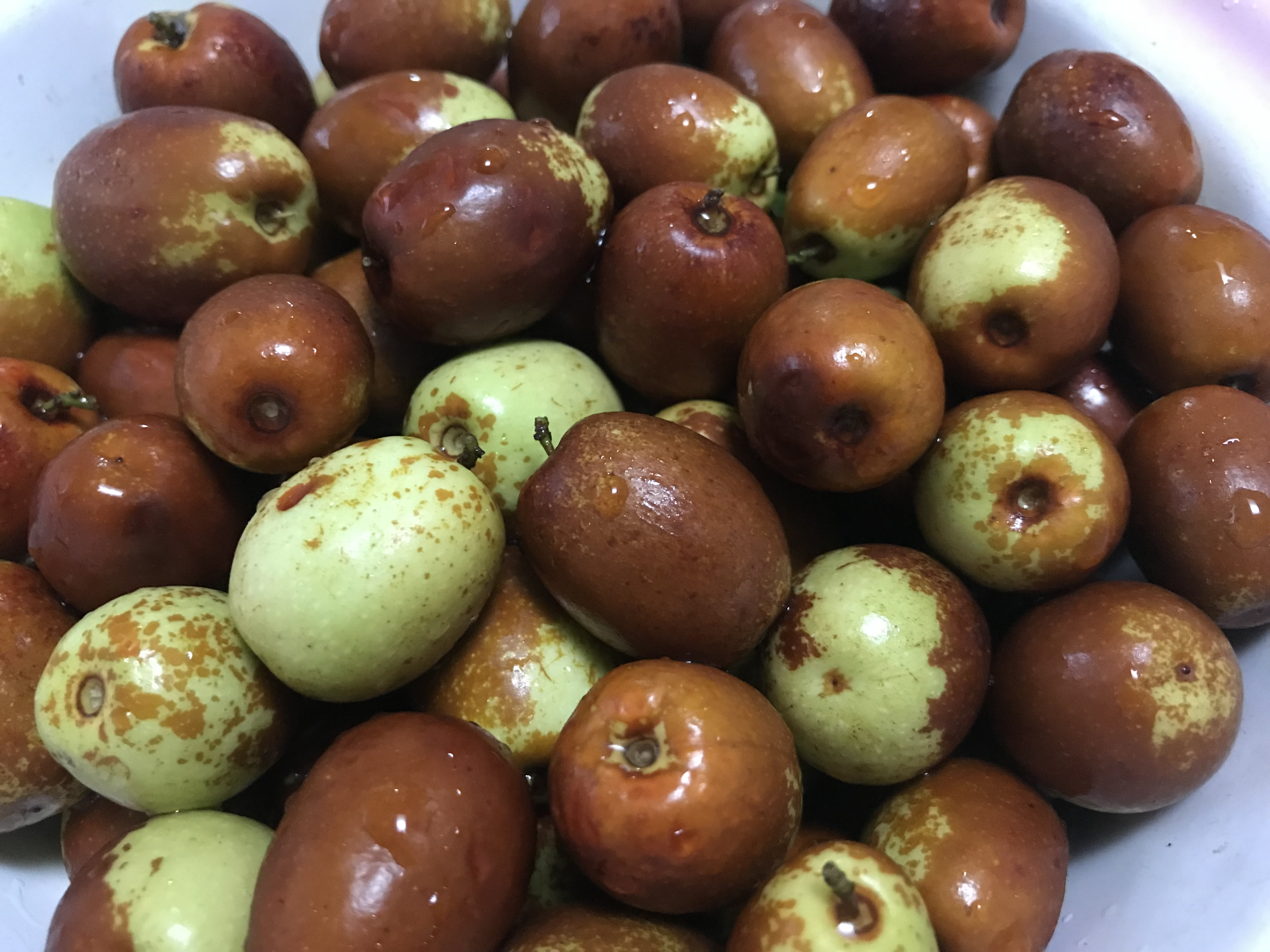
Chinese date from Laoling

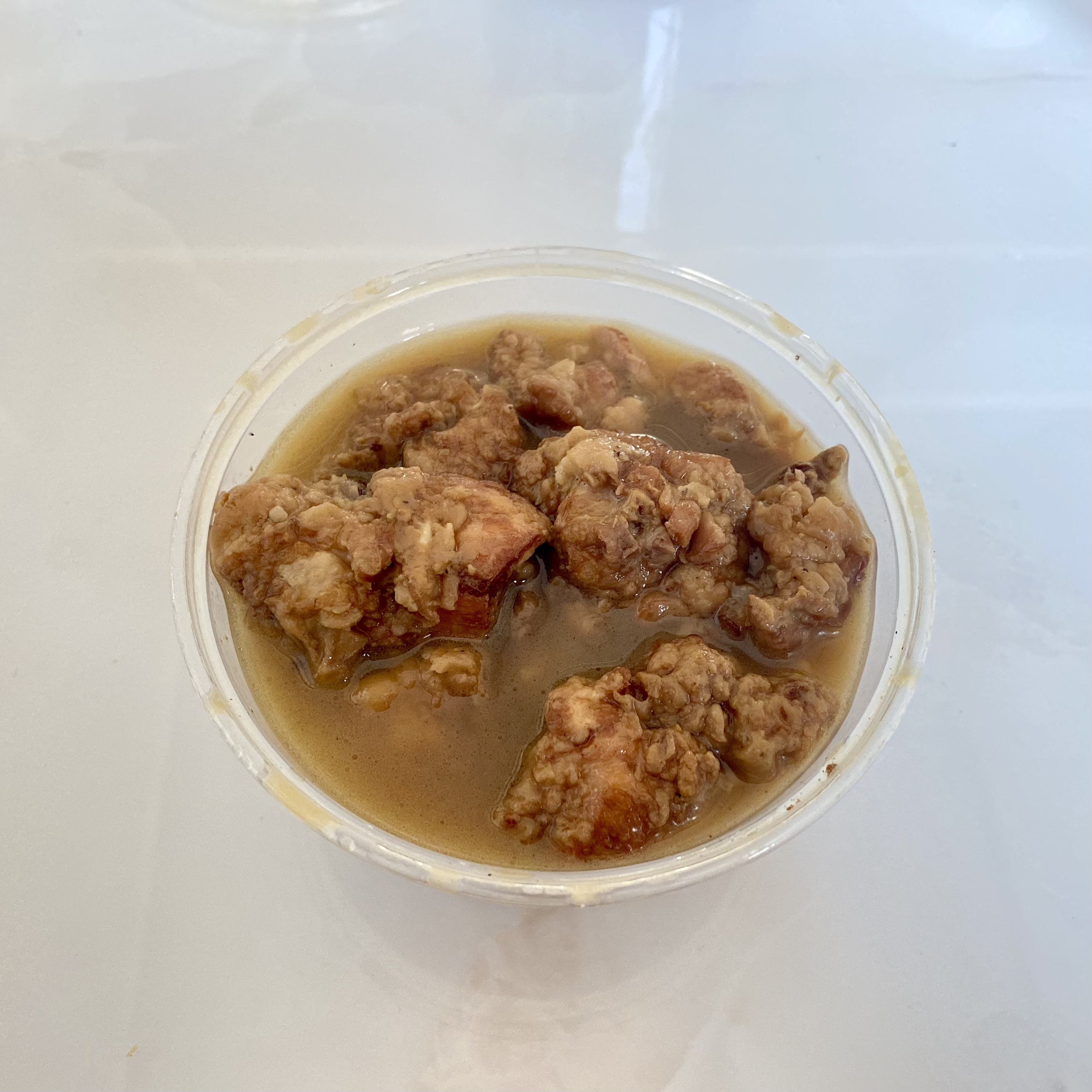
HuangMianJi

Laoling is famous for Chinese date. Also Boiled Fried Chicken (HuangMianJi, 黄面鸡) is the local cuisine that often offers during the Spring Festival.

== Tourism and residence ==
Laoling City has a national 4A scenic area “Wanmu Zaolin Forest Tourist Area”, and Laoling Chinese-date museum which is a local museum of Jujube.

There are a number of hotels in Laoling City that offer residential services to tourists from home and abroad.

== Education and culture ==
Laoling has public and private primary and secondary schools and high schools, but no university.

Laoling has a long history and traditional Chinese culture.

In 2024, Laoling Film Studio was established in Laoling.
