= Divas Hit the Road =

- 花儿与少年
- Genre: Travel-variety
- Created by: Hunan TV
- Directed by: Liao Ke (S1-2); Wu Mengzhi (S3); Li Chao, Zhu Feng (S4-5)
- Starring: S1: Cheng Pei-pei; Zhang Kaili; Xu Qing; Liu Tao; Li Fei'er; Hans Zhang; Hua Chenyu S2: Mao Amin; Xu Qing; Ning Jing; Ivy Chen; Zheng Shuang; Yang Yang; S3: Tony Yang; Chen Bolin; Jiang Shuying; Zhang Ruoyun; Jing Boran; Gülnezer Bextiyar; Lai Yumeng; Song Zu'er; S4: Zhang Kaili; Liu Mintao; Yang Mi; Lisi Danni; Zhao Jinmai; Elvis Han; Ding Chengxin; S5: Qin Hailu; Qin Lan; Xin Zhilei; Dilraba Dilmurat; Zhao Zhaoyi; Wang Anyu; Hu Xianxu; S6:Chen hao Victoria song Liu Ye; Gina jin Zhou Yutong; Hou Minghao; Tian Jiarui; Rong zishan S7:Na Ying; Chen Shu; Ma Sichun; Li Qin; Zhang Yaqi; Gong Jun; Zhang Wanyi
- Composer: Ye Xiao
- Country of origin: China
- Original language: Chinese
- No. of seasons: 7
- No. of episodes: 70

Production
- Producers: Zhang Huali; Liu Xiangqun; Li Hao
- Production locations: Australia; Brazil; Italy; Namibia; South Africa; Spain; Turkey; United Arab Emirates; United Kingdom; Madagascar; Egypt; Czech Republic; Norway
- Camera setup: Multi-camera
- Running time: 80-100 minutes
- Production company: HBS

Original release
- Network: China Hunan Satellite Television
- Release: April 25, 2014

Divas Hit the Road (花儿与少年) is a reality television show produced by Hunan TV. In each season, a group of "sisters" and "brothers" travel together while planning and managing their own trips. The first season aired in 2014, and the most recent season in 2026.

== Season 1 ==
=== Role ===
| Name | Birthday | Role | |
| Name | Birthday | Italy | Spain |
Sisters （花儿）
| Cheng Pei-pei | January 6, 1946 (age 80) | Big sister, translator | Big sister, 4th tour guide, translator |
| Zhang Kaili | September 29, 1962 (age 64) | 2nd sister | 2nd sister, 3rd tour guide |
| Xu Qing | January 22, 1969 (age 57) | 3rd sister | 3rd sister, 2nd tour guide |
| Liu Tao | July 12, 1978 (age 48) | 4th sister, tour guide assistant | 4th sister, 5th tour guide |
| Li Fei'er | October 3, 1987 (age 39) | 5th sister | 5th sister, 1st tour guide |
弟弟 （少年）
| Zhang Han | October 6, 1984 (age 42) | Chief tour guide | Tour guide assistant |
| Hua Chenyu | February 7, 1990 (age 36) | Accountant | Accountant |

== Season 2 ==
=== Role ===
| Name | Birthday | Role | | |
| Name | Birthday | United Kingdom | Turkey | United Arab Emirates |
Sister （花儿）
| Mao Amin | March 1, 1963 (age 63) | Big sister, translator | Big sister, translator | Big sister, translator |
| Xu Qing | January 22, 1969 (age 57) | 2nd sister | 2nd sister | 2nd sister, accountant |
| Ning Jing | April 27, 1972 (age 54) | 3rd sister | 3rd sister | 3rd sister |
| Ivy Chen | November 12, 1982 (age 43) | 4th sister, chef | 4th sister, chef | 4th sister, photographer |
| Zheng Shuang | August 22, 1991 (age 35) | 5th sister, tour guide | 5th sister, accountant | 5th sister |
Brother （少年）
| Jing Boran | April 19, 1989 (age 37) | Big brother, photographer | Big brother, tour guide | Big brother, tour guide assistant |
| Yang Yang | September 9, 1991 (age 35) | 2nd brother, "human" GPS | 2nd brother, photographer | 2nd brother |

== Season 3 (Adventure Season) ==
=== Role ===
| Name | Birthday | Role | | | |
| Name | Birthday | Brazil&Namibia | South Africa | Namibia | Australia |
Sister（花儿）
| Jiang Shuying | September 1, 1986 (age 40) | 5th sister, accountant | 5th sister, accountant | 5th sister, accountant | 5th sister, accountant |
| Guli Nazha | May 2, 1992 (age 34) | 6th sister | 6th sister | 6th sister | 6th sister |
| Lai Yumeng | March 18, 1995 (age 31) | 7th sister | 7th sister | 7th sister | 7th sister |
| Song Zu'er | May 23, 1998 (age 28) | 8th sister | 8th sister | 8th sister | 8th sister |
Brother（少年）
| Tony Yang | August 30, 1982 (age 44) | Big brother, chef, driver | Big brother, chef, driver | Big brother, chef, driver | Big brother, chef, driver |
| Chen Bolin | August 27, 1983 (age 43) | 2nd brother, tour guide | 2nd brother, tour guide | 2nd brother, tour guide | 2nd brother, tour guide |
| Zhang Ruoyun | August 24, 1988 (age 38) | 3rd brother, chef, tour guide, driver, (translator) | 3rd brother, chef, tour guide, driver, (translator) | 3rd brother, chef, tour guide, driver, (translator) | 3rd brother, chef, tour guide, driver, (translator) |
| Jing Boran | April 19, 1989 (age 37) | 4th brother | 4th brother | 4th brother | 4th brother |

== Season 4 (Camp Season) ==
| Name | Birthday | Role |
Sisters
| Zhang Kaili | September 29, 1962 (age 64) | Big sister, 1st accountant, 2nd leader |
| Liu Mintao | January 10, 1976 (age 50) | 2nd sister、2nd accountant |
| Yang Mi | September 12, 1986 (age 40) | 3rd sister, 1st leader, 2nd deputy leader |
| Lisi Danni | April 26, 1990 (age 36) | 4th sister |
| Zhao Jinmai | September 29, 2002 (age 24) | 5th sister |
Brothers
| Elvis Han | July 21, 1992 (age 34) | Elder brother |
| Ding Chengxin | February 24, 2002 (age 24) | Younger brother |

== Season 5 (Silk Road Season) ==
| Name | Age | Role | Notes |
|---|---|---|---|
| Qin Hailu | August 11, 1978 (aged 45) | Big sister | |
| Qin Lan | July 17, 1979 (aged 44) | 2nd sister | |
| Xin Zhilei | April 8, 1986 (aged 37) | 3rd sister | |
| Dilraba Dilmurat | June 3, 1992 (aged 31) | 4th sister | Absent from the Jeddah recording due to scheduling conflicts |
| Zhao Zhaoyi | May 21, 1999 (aged 24) | 5th sister | |
| Wang Anyu | February 3, 1998 (aged 25) | Elder brother | |
| Hu Xianxu | August 17, 2000 (aged 23) | Younger brother | |

== Season 6 (Travel season) ==
| Name | Age | Role | Ref/Notes |
|---|---|---|---|
| Chen hao | | Elder sister | |
| Victoria song | | Second elder sister | Tour guide in France |
| Liu Ye | | Third elder sister | |
| Gina jin | | Fourth elder sister | |
| Zhou yutong | 30 as per 2024 | Fifth elder sister | Group leader in Africa |
| Deng ancy | | Youngest sister | Tour guide in chile |
| Hou minghao | 27 as per 2024 | Eldest brother | Tour guide in France, Group leader in Africa |
| Tian Jiarui | 25 as per 2024 | 2nd elder brother | Accountant/ money-handler, Driver |
| Rong Zishan | | Youngest brother | |

- Locations

|Chile, South America| |Paris, France| |Tanzania, Africa|

== Season 7 (Hearts United Season) ==
=== Role ===
| Name | Occupation | Role | | | |
| Name | Occupation | Madagascar | Egypt | Czech Republic | Norway |
Sisters （花儿）
| Na Ying | Singer, actress | Big sister | Big sister | Big sister | Big sister |
| Chen Shu | Actress | 2nd sister | 2nd sister | 2nd sister | 2nd sister |
| Ma Sichun | Actress | 3rd sister | 3rd sister | 3rd sister | 3rd sister |
| Li Qin | Actress | 4th sister | 4th sister | 4th sister, tour guide | 4th sister |
| Zhang Yaqi | TV host | 5th sister | 5th sister, accountant | 5th sister, accountant | 5th sister |
Brothers （少年）
| Gong Jun | Actor | Big brother, tour guide | Big brother，assistant tour guide | Big brother，assistant tour guide | Big brother |
| Zhang Wanyi | Actor | Younger brother, accountant | Younger brother, tour guide | Younger brother，assistant tour guide | Younger brother |

== Broadcast Schedule ==
| Season | Episodes | Originally aired | |
| Season | Episodes | Premiere | Finale |
|---|---|---|---|
| Season 1 | 8 | April 25, 2014 | June 13, 2014 |
| Season 2 | 11 | April 25, 2015 | July 4, 2015 |
| Season 3 | 12 | April 23, 2017 | July 9, 2017 |
| Season 4 | 12 | June 17, 2022 | September 2, 2022 |
| Season 5 | 14 | October 26, 2023 | January 25, 2024 |
| Season 6 | 13 excluding ep:0 | 5 September 2024 | 28 November 2024 |
| Season 7 | | 16 August 2025 | 15 November 2025 |
| Season 8 | | | |
