= Music industry of Asia =

- Location: Central Asia, East Asia, North Asia, South Asia, Southeast Asia, West Asia

The music industry of Asia is an industry in which people sell music-related products to earn money. The business structures of the industry include recorded music, live music, radio broadcasting, and digital and online distribution. The Asian music industry consists of music industry of Central Asia, East Asia, North Asia, South Asia, Southeast Asia, and West Asia. The music industry of Asia influences Asian culture and economy. The music industry of Asia also has a worldwide impact.

== History ==
=== Early history ===
Korean modern pop music firstly appeared in 1915, affected by Filipino pop songs. Since Japanese colonial authorities needed to restrict all forms of art in Korea, Korean rarely had the opportunity to establish their own modern music style. In the early 1920s, the recording industry emerged in Shanghai, China. Japanese pop music originated in the Showa Period, which was the heyday of Jazz music.

=== Modernization Period ===
The development of Japanese music industry was hindered by World War II. Subsequently, when Japan was occupied by the US, the US military played music such as boogie-woogie, mambo, blues, and country music, introducing new music styles to Japan. In 1948, the ‘Tokyo boogie-woogie’, Chiemi Eri's ‘Tennessee Waltz’, Misora Hibari's ‘Omatsuri Mambo’ and ‘Omoide no Waltz’ became the representative songs, and they were published as music records. During the 1950s and 1960s, pop music was weakening in the mainland of China due to the introduction of Soviet music.

=== Recent Development ===
And the 1990s were the heyday of J-pop when many records in the music market were broken. Sales revenue was more than 400 billion yen (around 2.7 Billion US dollars) in 1991, 500 billion yen in 1993, and reached an unsurpassed point of 607.5 billion yen in 1998. Music market expansion also brought music style diversification and strong competition. From 1995 to 1997, three major entertainment companies in South Korea (S.M.Entertainment, JYP Entertainment and YG Entertainment), were founded. In the first decade of the 21st century, music brands like BoA, TVXQ, Shinhwa, Super Junior, BigBang, Wonder Girls, Girls' Generation, 2AM, 2PM, emerged one after another, jointly creating the golden age of k-pop idols. At this stage, Korean entertainment companies were more systematic and professional in the idol industry. Underground artists also contributed to hip-hop mainstream. Kim Bum-soo was the first South Korean artist to reach the US Billboard Hot 100 chart and no. 51 in 2001. In 2005, "You are my rose", the first mobile album in China, completely broke the traditional marketing mode released through CD, store, network and other channels. On 19 February 2019, Johnny's Entertainment ( also called 株式会社ジャニーズ事務所 ) will officially launch virtual idols online in cooperation with SHOWROOM, a company providing video live streaming service.

== Business structure ==
=== Recorded music and radio broadcasting ===
In the early 1920s EMI Records Ltd from French, whose main businesses are film and music recording, set up a branch in Shanghai, that provided the quickest way to spread European and American pop music in China. In the end of the 1970s, the cassette tapes produced by Sanyo Japan and Pacific Audio & Video Co directly boosted Chinese popular music. In 1990, 180 million cassettes were sold in India, and that makes it the world's second-largest market for cassettes. In this year, Japan was ranked after the US. In China, the new generation of musicians was absorbing nutrition from European, American and Japanese music industry at will. They re-wrote the popular songs in the 1930s, carrying forward the past and forging ahead into the future. In Guangzhou, China, ‘The Old Three Musketeers’, consists of Youzhong Jin, Jialin Ding, and Kang Situ, were leaders in the music recording industry. In 2018, 66% of South Korean consumers listen to music by radio, and 50% of Japanese consumers listen to music by radio.

=== Live house ===
"Live House", which is a club with live music, is also a popular business structure in Asia. It firstly appeared in Japan, and was one of the four kinds of concert venues: music hall, arena, Dome and Live house. A Live House is the smallest concert venue, and usually has a capacity of 100 to 500 people. Zepp Tour appeared correspondingly, and it is a subsidiary of Sony Entertainment Music, which specializes in Live House. Zepp has six chain stores in Japan, namely, sendai, Hokkaido, Tokyo, Nagoya, Osaka and fukuoka. In Japan, a large Live House like Zepp in Tokyo is also the first choice for many overseas singers. The Zepp Tour is the venue for Japanese premiers by overseas singers and groups. In China, music consumers aged between 22 and 40 are increasingly interested in Live House performances. From 2014 to 2016, Chinese live houses fell into low tide period. Some high-quality Live houses (such as Beijing Sparrow House) closed down, and the well-known MAO Live House once confronted with the survival crisis. However, the small and medium-sized Live industry did not stop growing. With the consumption growth and consumption upgrade, millennials have higher requirements on the interactivity and experience of entertainment products, and the box office revenue of Live House has increased significantly.

=== Digital and online distribution ===
In 1997 musician Zhe Chen set up the first music website in China. By 2000, there were hundreds of music websites in DMVE cooperated with SINA to promote Lou Geng Sed's new song ‘butterfly flower’ on the website. In 2001, Xuecun's "All the people in northeast China are living Lei Feng" became a hit on the Internet, and it was the biggest news in the Chinese music industry. Since then, many singers have discovered a new possibility. In 2003, South Korea became the first music market where the sales revenue of digital music exceeded physical music sales. In 2004, "Mouse loves rice", "Lilac flower" and "Two butterflies" became popular, and online songs quickly became a popular cultural phenomenon. In 2018, 96% of Indian consumers use smartphones while listening music, and this is the highest rate all over the world, and message apps are the main ways for Chinese consumers to share their favorite songs (65% using Wechat, 64% using QQ and 62% using Weibo). The development of online distribution also caused a decline in the traditional recording industry, and the crisis of record industry lasted for nearly a decade. Compared to the first and second generation, the third generation of Korean idols represented by EXO, Got7, Winner and IKon are more globalized and rely more on the digital and online distribution. In the first quarter of 2018, QQ music, Kugou music and Kuwo music owned by Tencent music had 254 million active users, 227 million active users and 111 million active users respectively. In 2018, 70% of Tencent music's revenue came from users' fees for giving virtual gifts (such as stars and small tangyuan) to artists (or other users). The other 30% comes from paid streaming subscriptions, digital downloads and advertising.

== Regional Music Industry ==
=== East Asia ===
==== Chinese Music Industry ====
Chinese music market values licensed music, as 96% of Chinese consumers listen to licensed music and 89% of them listen to licensed audio streaming. Message apps are the main ways for Chinese consumers to share their favorite songs (65% using WeChat, 64% using QQ and 62% using Weibo). The most popular music genres in China are C-pop, pop, folk, country and soundtracks. In October 2018, the top 10 Chinese online music APP used by active users were: QQ Music, Kugou music, Kuwo music, 163 cloud music, Xiami music, Migu music, Miaomi music, Yin Yue Tai, iMusic, Baidu Ting Music. China's media and entertainment industries are witnessing a change in the nature of the relationship between fans and the artists/studios they follow. Fans are now influencing the market from sharing their original works as active members of the fan community, and participants in the "gift economy", leveraged by studio content experts seeking to ensure the success of the works before they are released into the market. Chinese media and entertainment companies are embracing the creativity of fans and looking for new ways to develop, invest in and nurture their fan base, co-create products, especially with high level "super fans", and go beyond mere lifestyle to drive purchases.

==== South Korea Music Industry ====
Until the end of 2018 South Korean music industry is mainly contributed by local music, 66% of South Korean consumers listen to K-pop and 22% of them listen to K-trot. Moreover, 66% of South Korean consumers listen to music by radio. Artist agencies in South Korea cultivate idols from a young age, by signing binding contracts with them, so the trainees learn the essential skills, such as singing, dancing, and foreign languages, in a rounded system which is provided by the agencies. In the first decade of the 21st century, BoA, TVXQ, Shinhwa, Super Junior, BigBang, Wonder Girls, Girls' Generation, 2AM, 2PM and so on, emerged one after another, jointly creating the golden age of k-pop idols. K-pop also gave birth to two of the biggest music groups of 2020s, BTS and Blackpink. At this stage, Korean entertainment companies were more systematic and professional in the idol industry. Korean entertainment companies have a completed idol industry, following a process of "trainee selection – trainee training – marketing planning – idol group selection – music production – release ". The agencies also have strict rules to control pop stars' daily life, including bowing, dating, and even getting married.

==== Japanese music Industry ====
In 2012 Japan was analysed as the world's largest music recording market for the first time. In the Japanese music industry, J-pop is very popular since 66% of Japanese consumers listen to it. Music from comics is also listened by 29% of Japanese consumers. Moreover, 50% of Japanese consumers listen to music by radio. Although Japanese idol industry sells multi-million dollars, many Japanese pop stars are paid with low salaries. The private lives of Japanese stars are also controlled by their agencies, or bound by contracts. Many of them have to ask their agencies for permission to date and even get married. While Japan led the world in the adoption of mobile consumer culture, such as ringtones, from the 1990s to the end of the 2000s, it has lagged behind in the adoption of streaming formats. Naming the online streaming service "radio" is not as familiar to new media as it is in the US. The lack of a legal licence further constrains the growth of streaming services, so they must negotiate rights with record labels, which are reluctant to offer Japanese content, including current top charts and out-of-date catalogues, to streaming companies. Finally, smartphones took longer to catch on in Japan because the flip phones of the mid-2000s were so advanced that the iPhone didn't look as groundbreaking when it was released.

=== South Asia ===
==== Indian music Industry ====
The Indian music industry is mainly contributed by local music, and the Indian top 5 favorite genres are new Bollywood music, old Bollywood music, Indian classical music, pop, and rock. 96% of Indian consumers use smartphones while listening to music, and this is the highest rate all over the world. Furthermore, 96% of them listen to licensed music, and 95% of them listen to music through on-demand streaming. However, the music industry in Garhwali (North India) produces popular music clips, which are sung in the local dialect and broadcast mainly on the Internet. This kind of video seems to be a medium for audience engagement: they bring together audiences from diverse geographic and social professional backgrounds whose music-oriented communication facilitates interpersonal and aesthetic or ethical debates. Garhwali clips are uploaded to streaming sites like YouTube, as well as information sites that follow Garhwal's or personal pages and blogs. On all of these platforms, listeners living abroad or outside gawar seem particularly keen to comment on the political and cultural content shown in the music segment.

==== Bangladeshi music Industry ====
Bangladesh claims some of the most renowned singers, composers and producers in Asia. Bengali music spans a wide variety of styles. Music has served the purpose of documenting the lives of the people and was widely patronized by the rulers. It comprises a long tradition of religious and regular song-writing over a period of almost a millennium. Currently, the thriving Bangladeshi music industry is one of the best in both quality and market in South Asia. There are many bands and artists releasing songs both independently and for the cinema industry in various genres.

=== Southeast Asia ===
==== Singaporean music Industry ====
There are various music genres in Singapore, such as rock, punk, pop, and western classical music, and Singapore pop stars like Stefanie Sun and JJ Lin are also popular in both Singapore and China. Singaporean music is based on various cultures, such as Chinese culture, Malaysian culture, Indian culture, and classical European culture. The popular music industry in Singapore advocates that the western music is superior to the local music in Singapore. Singaporeans are often sceptical about the quality of Singapore's musicians because they have "unrealistic" stereotypes about music. Therefore, starting from the phenomenon that music types such as J-pop and K-pop have become an indispensable part of music culture in Singapore.

==== Philippine music Industry ====
Music of the Philippines (ᜋᜓᜐᜒᜃ ᜈᜅ᜔ ᜉᜒᜎᜒᜉᜒᜈᜐ᜔) include musical performance arts in the Philippines or by Filipinos composed in various genres and styles. The compositions are often a mixture of different Asian, Spanish, Latin American, American, and indigenous influences. From 2010 to 2020, Philippine pop music or P-pop went through a huge metamorphosis in its increased quality, budget, investment, and variety, matching the country's rapid economic growth, and an accompanying social and cultural resurgence of its Asian identity. This was heard by heavy influence from K-pop and J-pop, growth in Asian style ballads, idol groups, and EDM music, and less reliance on Western genres, mirroring the Korean wave and similar Japanese wave popularity among millennial Filipinos and mainstream culture. Famous P-pop music artist who had defined the growth of this now mainstream genre like this five-member Global Pop group SB19, the first Filipino and Southeast Asian act to be nominated in Billboard Music Awards for the Top Social Artist category. They are also the first Southeast Asian act to enter the top 10 of Billboard Social 50 weekly and year-end charts.

== Worldwide impact ==
In the process of the development of Asian music industry, the overseas market has been highly valued. For example, SM Entertainment's business revenue grew rapidly from 96.9 billion in 2010 to more than 300 billion in 2014. At the same time, SM entertainment's overseas revenue accounted for more than 50% of the total revenue in 2012 and 2013, most of which came from the Japanese market and Chinese market. SM Entertainment also actively expands overseas, establishing business in North America, Europe, Western Europe and Asia.

The song "上を向いて歩こう" (a well-known song called ス キ ヤ キ) was a success. It was the first Japanese song to reach No. 1 in the U.S. (four weeks in Cashbox Magazine, three weeks in Billboard Magazine) of Japan and the America region ranking, and was awarded the "Gold record" for selling more than a million copies. In 2008, Sa Dingding won the BBC Radio 3 Awards for World Music and was invited to perform at the Royal Albert Hall to both eastern and western audiences. In 2009, Sa Dingding 's album Alive was listed as one of the 85 nominees for best world music album at Grammy Awards.

Until the end of 2018 three Asian countries joined the top 10 music markets (2nd in Japan, 6th in South Korea, 7th in China). Among the ‘global top 10 albums of 2018’, two albums of BTS are listed, and "Love Yourself 結 'Answer'" took the and "Love Yourself 转 'Tear'" took the 2nd and 3rd respectively, selling 5 million albums in total. Among the ‘global top 10 digital singles of 2018’, Tia Ray's "Be Apart" took the 7th place, selling 10.9 million units. In addition, BTS is the 2nd of ‘global recording artists 2018.Blackpink’s mv for ‘Kill this Love’, premiered on 4 April 2019, has reached over 100 million views on YouTube, breaking a record that reaching the overstepping click volume quicker than any other music video on YouTube.

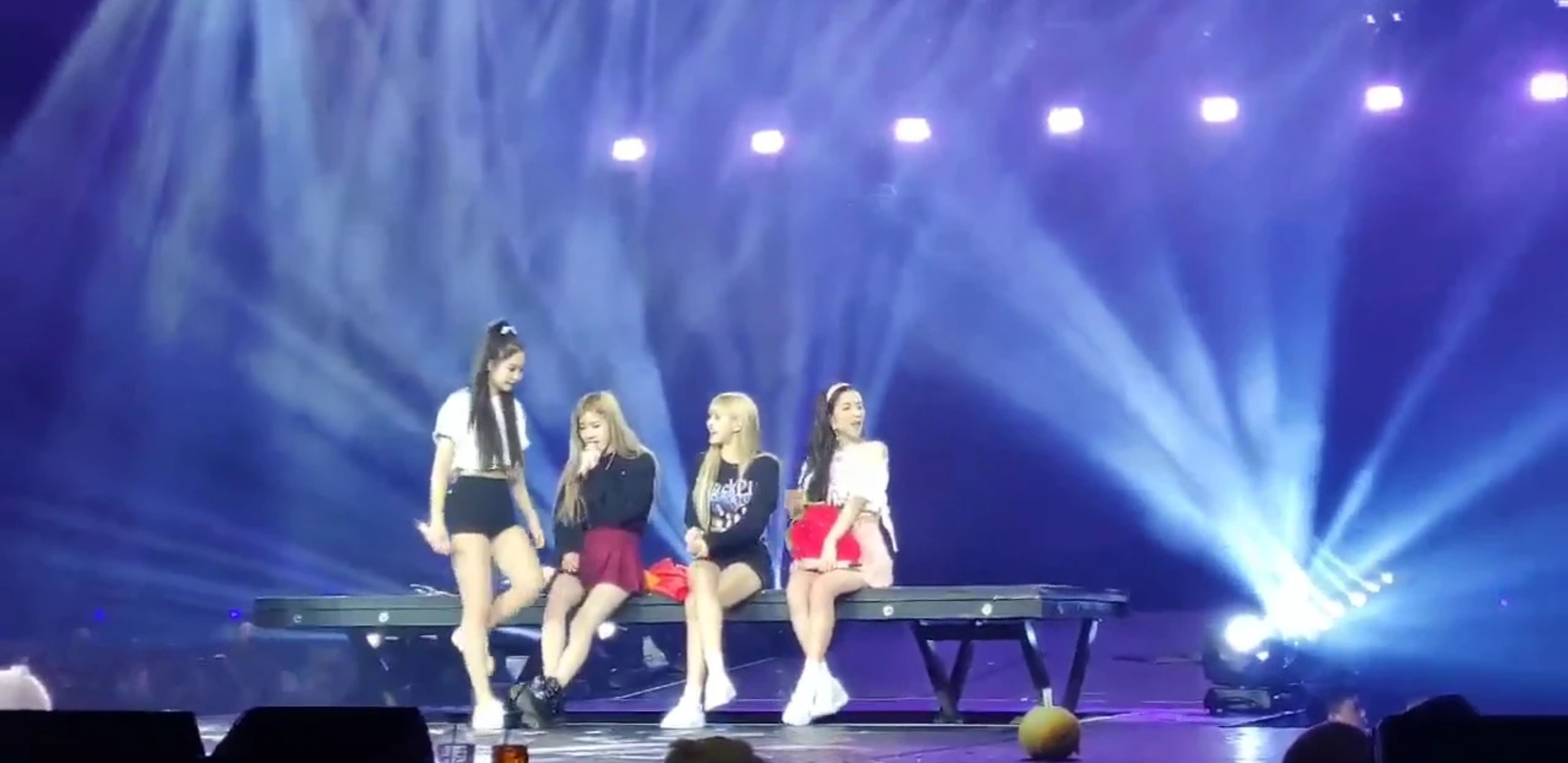
Blackpink, an Asian idol group.

As many Asian countries appear on the stage of the worldwide music industry, the Chinese music industry and the South Korean music industry have a positive influence on market growth. Until 2018, Asia has become the 2nd largest music industry of the combination of physical and digital music for the first time. However, by analyzing the development of the digital music market in Asia, most countries began their music industry with a large proportion of international music-related products, since early music lovers were more likely to be well-educated English users.

== Associations and organizations ==
- Hong Kong Recording Industry Alliance (HKRIA)
- Indian Music Industry (IMI)
- Philippine Association of the Record Industry (PARI)
- Recording Industry Association of Japan (RIAJ)
- Recording Industry Association of Malaysia (RIM)
- Recording Industry Foundation in Taiwan (RIT)
- Recording Industry Association Singapore(RIAS)
- Thai Entertainment Content Trade Association (TECA)

== See also ==
Asian music festivals
