= The Sun Rises on Us All =

2025 film by Cai Shangjun

- Chinese theatrical release poster

Chinese name
- Simplified Chinese: 日掛中天
Transcriptions
Standard Mandarin
- Hanyu Pinyin: Rì guà zhōng tiān
- Directed by: Cai Shangjun
- Written by: Han Nianjin; Cai Shangjun
- Produced by: Ma Shuang; Justine O.; Huang Titi
- Starring: Xin Zhilei; Zhang Songwen; Feng Shaofeng
- Cinematography: Kim Hyun-seok
- Edited by: Matthieu Laclau; Yann-Shan Tsai
- Music by: Guo Sida
- Production companies: Guangzhou Mint Pictures; Guangzhou Zizai Media
- Release dates: 5 September 2025 (Venice); 7 November 2025 (China)
- Running time: 131 minutes
- Country: China
- Language: Mandarin

The Sun Rises on Us All (Chinese: 日掛中天, romanized: Rì guà zhōng tiān) is a 2025 Chinese drama film directed by Cai Shangjun, co-written by Han Nianjin and Cai. It follows Meiyun (Xin Zhilei) and Baoshu (Zhang Songwen), a former couple, who meet again years after their separation.

The film had its world premiere in the main competition of the 82nd Venice International Film Festival on 5 September 2025, where Xin won the Volpi Cup for Best Actress. It was theatrically released in China on 7 November.

== Synopsis ==
Former lovers Baoshu and Meiyun have estranged after an accident. Seven years later, the man and woman meet again and are confronted with long-forgotten secrets from their past.

== Cast ==
- Xin Zhilei as Meiyun
- Zhang Songwen as Baoshu
- Feng Shaofeng as Qifeng

== Production ==
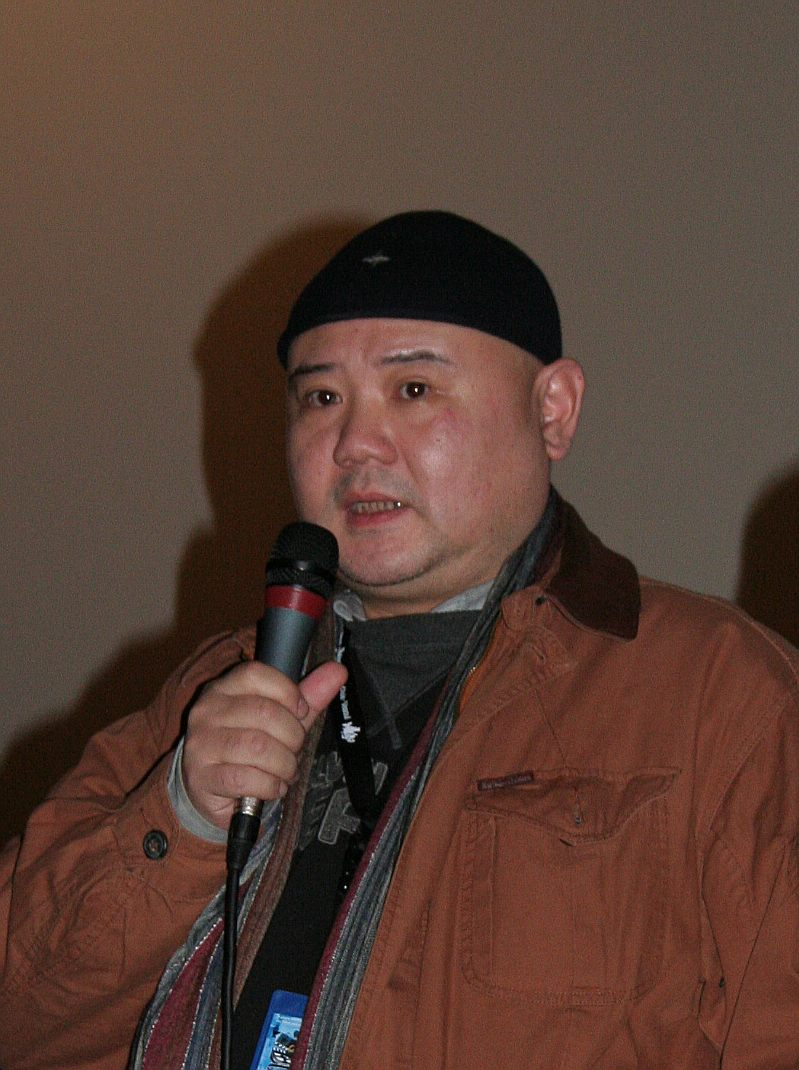
Cai Shangjun (2008)

From early 2020, Cai Shangjun began co-writing a movie script with his wife, Han Nianjin, under lockdown in China. While his previous works, People Mountain People Sea (2011) and The Conformist (2017), reflect social problems in contemporary China, Cai Shangjun shifted his focus to the lives of ordinary people, in an effort to address the complexity of emotional experiences. The Sun Rises on Us All explores moral dilemma through a story about sacrifice and redemption.

After finishing their first draft, in 2023, Cai began casting actors. Han recommended Xin Zhilei for the role of Meiyun. Cai watched a Chinese adaptation of Prima Facie starring Xin and was impressed by her acting. Seeing Xin on a reality show also made Cai appreciate her candid personality. Yang Chao, the director of Crosscurrent (2016) that starred Xin, shared Xin’s contact information with Cai. Xin read the script immediately after receiving it from Cai and was thrilled by the role of Meiyun. “I must play her,” Xin told Cai, “This is the character that I have always longed for.” Cai then cast Xin as Meiyun.

Cai set his film primarily in Guangzhou, the capital city of Guangdong province in South China. Cai liked Guangzhou for its cultural diversity, commenting “Guangzhou was one of the first beneficiaries of China’s economic reform; its close proximity to Hong Kong also made Guangzhou subject to the influence of popular culture of Hong Kong.” Filming began on July 14, 2024. Aside from Guangzhou, filming also took place in Shaoguan and Dongguan, two other cities in Guangdong province. Shaoguan is the native city of Zhang Songwen, who plays Baoshu in the film. The production companies received film production incentives from the government of Guangdong province. The film was shot in a period of 50 days.

Cai worked with South Korean cinematographer Kim Hyun-seok, who previously shot Lee Chang-dong’s Poetry (2010).

== Release ==
The Sun Rises on Us All was selected to compete for the Golden Lion at the 82nd Venice International Film Festival, where it had its world premiere on 5 September 2025. It is Cai Shangjun's second invitation to the competition following his film People Mountain People Sea in 2011.

It was also screened at the 50th Toronto International Film Festival, the 30th Busan International Film Festival, and the 9th Pingyao International Film Festival.

It was released in China on 7 November 2025.

== Reception ==
=== Critical response ===
On the review aggregator website Rotten Tomatoes, 75% of 12 critics' reviews are positive. Metacritic, which uses a weighted average, assigned the film a score of 69 out of 100, based on 5 critics, indicating "generally favorable" reviews.

=== Accolades ===
Award	Date of ceremony	Category	Recipient(s)	Result	Ref.
Venice Film Festival	6 September 2025	Golden Lion	Cai Shangjun	Nominated	
Venice Film Festival	6 September 2025	Volpi Cup for Best Actress	Xin Zhilei	Won	
Asia Pacific Screen Awards	27 November 2025	Best Film	The Sun Rises on Us All	Nominated	
Asia Pacific Screen Awards	27 November 2025	Best Performance	Xin Zhilei	Nominated	
Shanghai Film Critics Awards	11 January 2026	Film of Merit	The Sun Rises on Us All	Won	
Fribourg International Film Festival	28 March 2026	Ecumenical Jury Award	The Sun Rises on Us All	Won	
China Film Director's Guild Awards	5 July 2026	Best Director	Cai Shangjun	Won	
China Film Director's Guild Awards	5 July 2026	Best Actress	Xin Zhilei	Won	
