= Divas Hit the Road 5 season 5 =

2023 Chinese television series

- zh：花儿与少年·丝路季
- Genre: Reality Show
- Based on: Seasonal TV Program
- Directed by: Li Chao, Cai Xi
- Starring: Participants of Divas Hit the Road: Silk Road Season
- Composer: Ye Xiao
- Country of origin: Mainland China
- Original language: Mandarin
- No. of episodes: 14

Production
- Executive producers: Zhang Huali; Gong Zhengwen
- Producer: Cai Huaijun
- Camera setup: Multi-camera
- Running time: 90 minutes
- Production companies: Hunan Happy Sunshine Interactive Entertainment Media Co., Ltd.

Original release
- Network: Mango TV
- Release: 25 October 2023 – 25 January 2024
- Network: Hunan Television
- Release: 26 October 2023 – 25 January 2024

Related
- Divas Hit the Road: Friends

Divas Hit The Road 5 (Chinese: 花儿与少年·丝路季) is a celebrity self-guided study tour reality show jointly produced by Hunan Television and Mango TV. The show premiered on Mango TV on October 25, 2023, with new episodes released every Wednesday at 12:00 PM, and began airing simultaneously on Hunan Television every Thursday at 10:00 PM starting October 26. As the fifth season of the Divas Hit The Road series, this installment features seven celebrity guests—Qin Hailu, Qin Lan, Xin Zhilei, Dilraba Dilmurat, Zhao Zhaoyi, Wang Anyu, and Hu Xianxu—who travel to different countries and cities with limited funds to explore local history and culture.

== Program description ==
Coinciding with the 10th anniversary of the Belt and Road Initiative, this season is themed the “Silk Road Season.” The seven guests—Qin Hailu, Qin Lan, Xin Zhilei, Dilraba Dilmurat, Zhao Zhaoyi, Wang Anyu, and Hu Xianxu—form the "Beidou Seven Travelers" tour group and embark on a self-guided journey through three countries: Saudi Arabia, Croatia, and Iceland. In Saudi Arabia, Wang Anyu and Hu Xianxu serve as tour guides; in Croatia, the guides are Qin Lan and Dilraba. For the final leg in Iceland, all seven guests take turns acting as day guides, responsible for planning and arranging accommodation, transportation, and sightseeing.

During the 23-day trip, the cast participates in required “study tour” sessions. These include on-site visits to key Belt and Road cooperation projects such as the Pelješac Bridge and the Haramain High-Speed Railway, as well as visits to Chinese enterprises operating abroad and interactions with local residents. Through these activities, they gain a deeper understanding of China's infrastructure cooperation and investment influence in Belt and Road partner countries.

In addition, this season features changes to the travel budget structure compared to previous seasons. For the Saudi Arabia and Croatia legs, the funds are provided by the production team based on the planned itinerary. At the end of each segment, the guests take a quiz arranged by the crew, and the results determine the budget for the final graduation trip in Iceland.

This season is sponsored by Dove. It is produced by Mango TV, with production teams led by Li Chao from Hunan TV and Cai Xi from Mango TV. The show is made under the guidance of the International Cooperation Department of the National Radio and Television Administration. The theme song from the first season, Divas Hit the Road, is re-recorded by this season's cast and was officially released on QQ Music on the premiere day, October 25, 2023.

== Cast ==
Name	Age	Role	Notes	Reference
Qin Hailu	August 11, 1978 (aged 45)	Eldest sister		
Qin Lan	July 17, 1979 (aged 44)	Second sister		
Xin Zhilei	April 8, 1986 (aged 37)	Third sister		
Dilraba Dilmurat	June 3, 1992 (aged 31)	Fourth sister	Absent from filming in Jeddah due to scheduling conflicts	
Zhao Zhaoyi	May 21, 1999 (aged 24)	Fifth sister		
Wang Anyu	February 3, 1998 (aged 25)	Eldest brother		
Hu Xianxu	August 17, 2000 (aged 23)	Youngest brother		

== Travel route ==
Filming locations of Divas Hit the Road: Silk Road Season

Country	Cities	Tour Guides	References
Saudi Arabia	Riyadh, AlUla, Jeddah	Wang Anyu, Hu Xianxu	
Croatia	Dubrovnik, Split	Qin Lan, Dilraba Dilmurat	
Iceland	Reykjavík, Höfn	All cast members (rotating daily guides)	

== Promotional events ==
Broadcast Date	Event	Attendees	References
December 9, 2023	Hello, Saturday	Qin Hailu, Qin Lan, Xin Zhilei, Zhao Zhaoyi, Wang Anyu, Hu Xianxu	

== Reception and impact ==
This season of the show received a high rating of 9.0 on Douban, making it the highest-scoring season among all five installments. According to China’s audiovisual big data viewership records, the program averaged a rating of 0.276% and a market share of 1.682% during the first quarter of 2024.The total number of views has exceeded 4 billion to date.

The show generated tens of thousands of trending topics on social media and ranked third on both the Variety Show Influence List and Reputation List in the 2023 Weibo Entertainment Annual White Paper. Qin Lan was humorously nicknamed “Electric Dora” by netizens due to her vocal cord injury, with related topics topping Weibo’s hot meme chart.

In episode six, the cast participated in a cultural exchange event aboard the Karaka sailing ship. During this segment, Dilraba Dilmurat wore traditional Uyghur attire and performed an ethnic dance. This clip was widely shared on social media by Foreign Ministry spokesperson and deputy director of the Information Department Wang Wenbin, as well as the Ministry's Department of Latin America and the Caribbean, describing the performance as “dazzling.” The Embassy of the People's Republic of China in the Kingdom of Saudi Arabia praised the show for portraying the vast theme of the Belt and Road Initiative through relatable, understandable, and emotionally resonant everyday details from a grassroots and public perspective, thus telling a credible, charming, and respectable image of China.

Media outlets noted that, compared to previous seasons which emphasized conflicts and disputes among the cast, this season focused more on positive emotional values, effective communication between guests, and showcasing their most authentic interactions during the journey. Coupled with the production team’s efforts to create a more autonomous and genuine travel experience, as well as cultural exchanges with foreigners, these factors contributed to the season's high popularity and favorable reputation.
