= Guo Xiaoting =

Chinese actress

Xiaoting Guo
- Guo in We Are All Alone (2020)
- Born: January 2, 1993 (age 33); Shanghai, China
- Other name: Cristy Guo
- Education: Shanghai Theatre Academy
- Occupation: Actress
- Years active: 1999–present

Chinese name
- Traditional Chinese: 郭曉婷
- Simplified Chinese: 郭晓婷
Transcriptions
Standard Mandarin
- Hanyu Pinyin: Guō Xiǎotíng

Xiaoting Guo (Chinese: 郭晓婷, born 2 January 1993) is a Chinese actress. She graduated from Shanghai Theatre Academy in 2015. She is best known for her role in the dramas Chinese Paladin 3 (2009), We Are All Alone (2020), and The Blue Whisper (2022).

== Early life and career ==
Guo Xiaoting was born in Shanghai on January 2, 1993. In 1999, Guo Xiaoting made her first debut in the drama Love Talks as a child actor. She then played child roles in several dramas. She attended the Shanghai No. 3 Girls' High School. She became known for her role as Hua Ying in Chinese Paladin 3 (2009). She played a supporting role as Princess Suwan Guwalgiya-Minmin in Scarlet Heart (2011). At the same year, Guo Xiaoting attended the Shanghai Theater Academy. After graduation, she starred in her first leading role in The Great Shaolin in 2016. Since 2019, she gained more recognition for starring main roles as Liu Lixian in Once Upon a Time in Lingjian Mountain (2019), Lin Xiang in We Are All Alone (2020), Shunde Fairy/Ning Xiyu in The Blue Whisper (2022), and Chidi Nüzi in Love Between Fairy and Devil (2022).

== Filmography ==
=== Television series ===
Year	English title	Chinese title	Role	Notes/Ref.
2009	Chinese Paladin 3	仙剑奇侠传三	Hua Ying	
2009	Cold Nights	寒夜	Gao Ruyan	
2010	A Weaver on the Horizon	天涯织女	Fu Yaya	
2011	Scarlet Heart	步步惊心	Princess Suwan Guwalgiya-Minmin	
2012	Refresh	刷新3+7	Emily	
2013	The Orphan of Zhao	赵氏孤儿案	Cao Er	
2014	Girl in Icebox	冰箱少女	Xue Gao	Mini-series
2015	Tiger Mom	虎妈猫爸	Zhao Jiale	
2015	Epiphyllum Dream	昙花梦	Huo Mi'er	
2016	Chinese Paladin 5	仙剑云之凡	Cao Gu	
2016	The Great Shaolin	少林问道	Li Zhenzhen	Lead debut
2016	Great Marriage Custom	大嫁风尚	Zhou Xixi	Cameo
2016	Our Glorious Days	我们光荣的日子	Zhang Yingzi	
2016	Stay with Me	放弃我, 抓紧我		Cameo
2017	The Peach Blossom	一树桃花开	Sheng Fang	
2017	The Starry Night, The Starry Sea	那片星空那片海	Zhou Buyan	
2018	A Legend of A Modern Man Gets Back to Qin Dynasty	寻秦记	Xing Yun/Qin Qing	
2019	Once Upon a Time in Lingjian Mountain	从前有座灵剑山	Liu Li Xian	
2020	Forward Forever	热血同行	Xi Xian'er	
2020	We Are All Alone	怪你过分美丽	Lin Xiang	
2021	Qian Xing Zhe	前行者	Jiang Yunqing	
2022	The Blue Whisper	驭鲛记	Fairy Shunde/Ning Xiyu	
2022	Love Between Fairy and Devil	苍兰诀	Chidi Nüzi	
2022	Being A Hero	冰雨火	Yang Ling	
2022	Rising Lady	她们的名字	Yu Feifei	
2022	Thank You, Doctor	谢谢你医生	Zheng Yajie	
2026	The Early Spring	《早春晴朗》	Zang Yao	
TBA	War and People †	《战争和人》	Ouyang Suxin	
