= We Are All Alone =

Chinese television series

- 怪你过分美丽
- Genre: Romance, Drama
- Written by: Shu Peng
- Directed by: Wang Zhi
- Starring: Qin Lan; Gao Yixiang; Wang Ziyi; Wang Yaoqing; Hui Yinghong; Guo Xiaoting
- Country of origin: China
- Original language: Mandarin
- No. of seasons: 1
- No. of episodes: 36

Production
- Producers: Dai Ying（戴莹） Wang Yixu（王一栩） Liang Zhenhua（梁振华） Shen Jingjing（沈京京）
- Production location: China
- Running time: 45-48 minutes
- Production companies: iQIYI, Inc. Beijing Flying Youth Culture Media Company Stellar Media Company

Original release
- Release: 8 June – 15 July 2020

Related
- Rising With the Wind

We Are All Alone（Chinese: 怪你过分美丽; Pinyin: Guai Ni Guo Fen Mei Li）is a 2020 Chinese television series based on the novel of the same name by Wei Zai. Starring Qin Lan, Gao Yixiang, Wang Ziyi, Wang Yaoqing, Hui Yinghong and Guo Xiaoting, the series premiered on iQIYI with multi-language subtitles on June 8, 2020. The series was highly praised by critics and netizens for its overall more mature plot, cinematography, acting particularly from the two leads, and its realistic portrayal of the entertainment industry. Its release was widely popular among Chinese and international viewers due to its high praise and the passing of Godfrey Gao in November 2019, making the series his final role prior to his death.

== Synopsis ==
Mo Xiangwan (Qin Lan) is known as the iron-willed agent of showbiz. At the Golden Urn awards, two of Mo Xiangwan's biggest artists Xu Ling (Wang Ziyi) and Lin Xiang (Guo Xiaoting) are nominated for an award. However, hidden dangers lie beneath the shimmering lights of stardom.

Mo Bei (Godfrey Gao) is the hotshot lawyer who specializes in commercial law. Once lovers in university, Mo Bei and Mo Xiangwan have not seen each other in ten years. Their paths cross as Mo Bei moves back to Shanghai in hopes of reuniting with Mo Xiangwan.

Despite her stature, Mo Xiangwan suffers multiple crises as the staff at her company Qili plot to take her position. Because of a strategic mistake, Mo Xiangwan loses her artists and ultimately resigns. She learns many things in the process of finding herself as she reclaims her road to success.

Through her encounters, Mo Xiangwan begins to appreciate the ingenuity and passion actors have for their work. She overhauls her methods and decides to focus on making good projects. Amid the endless conflicts of interest and passions... who will be the ultimate winner in the battle?

== Cast ==
- Qin Lan as Mo Xiangwan
  - An assertive, resourceful and collected agent director of Qili Culture. While she is strict and ambitious, she is extremely protective and dedicated to her artists. She grows to have an understanding for her artists' work and adapts to their needs. She later sets up her own agency Qingyuan Entertainment.
- Godfrey Gao as Mo Bei
  - Lawyer of LSM Firm. An expert in Civil and Commercial Law. A morally upright person who sticks firmly to his principles. He feels guilty for Mo Xiangwan's father's imprisonment and returns to Shanghai after ten years hoping to reconcile with Mo Xiangwan.
- Wang Ziyi as Xu Ling
  - Artist of Qili Culture. He is hardworking but feels inferior to Lin Xiang as an artist and wants to prove himself. He chooses to leave for rival agency Fei Xiang Entertainment due to his feelings for Mo Xiangwan.
- Wang Yaoqing as Yu Jiang
  - CEO of Qili Culture. Originally partners with Mo Xiangwan in starting Qili Culture, he becomes a worrisome, unscrupulous businessman as Qili Culture begins to collapse after multiple scandals.
- Kara Hui as Ruan Li Hua
  - An award-winning actress who retired from the industry. First artist managed by Mo Xiangwan. She comes out of retirement with the help of Mo Xiangwan after a financial crisis.
- Guo Xiaoting as Lin Xiang
  - Artist of Qili Culture. A temperamental woman, she is one of the most famous artists in the industry with a large fan base but spirals into depression as fame takes a toll.
- Zhang Yanyan as Zhu He
  - Ex-wife of Yu Jiang and shareholder of Qili Culture. She sees Mo Xiangwan as a threat and works with Zhudi Chen to remove her.
- Li Qian as Zhudi (Judy) Chen
  - Agent of Qili Culture. She sees Mo Xiangwan as her rival and takes her place as agent director.
- Peng Bo as Hao Mai
  - Agent director of Fan Xiang Entertainment. Rival of Mo Xiangwan. Luo Feng's manager.
- Wang Zirui as Luo Feng
  - Artist of Fan Xiang Entertainment. A famous actor and Lin Xiang's ex-boyfriend.
- Zhang Xianzi as Guan Xian
  - Boss of More Beautiful Bar, Mo Xiangwan's Good friend

== Spin-off ==
Six new scenes taking place after the events of the series were released under the name We Are All Alone: Not Alone (怪你过分美丽番外) on July 8, 2020, one week after the final episode aired. The first four scenes are about the married life of Mo Xiangwan (Qin Lan) and Mo Bei (Godfrey Gao) with their son Mo Fei. Another scene features a defeated Yu Jiang (Wang Yaoqing) imagining Mo Xiangwan visiting him at his company Qili. The final scene offers an alternate ending with Mo Xiangwan and Mo Bei visiting Lin Xiang (Guo Xiaoting) in an institution.
