= The Blue Whisper =

2022 Chinese television series

- Promotional poster
- Simplified Chinese: 驭鲛记
- Hanyu Pinyin: Yù Jiāo Jì
- Genre: Romance; Historical; Fantasy
- Based on: The Tale of the Merman by Jiulu Feixiang
- Directed by: Zhu Ruibin
- Starring: Dilraba Dilmurat; Ren Jialun
- Opening theme: "More Than Blanks" (留白是表白) by Jin Zhiwen
- Ending theme: "Mermaid Song" (鮫人之歌) by Zhou Shen
- Composer: Sa Dingding
- Country of origin: China
- Original language: Mandarin
- No. of seasons: 1
- No. of episodes: 42

Production
- Executive producers: Liu Zhi; Xie Ying; Wang Ying; Li Dong; Liu Jiali
- Producer: Yang Liu
- Production locations: Hengdian World Studios; Zhejiang
- Running time: 45 minutes
- Production companies: Youku; Croton Media

Original release
- Release: March 17 – May 18, 2022

The Blue Whisper (Chinese: 驭鲛记; pinyin: Yù Jiāo Jì), is a 2022 Chinese television series starring Dilraba Dilmurat and Ren Jialun. It is based on the xuanhuan romance Web novel The Tale of the Merman by Jiulu Feixiang. It aired from March 17, 2022, to May 18, 2022. The series was divided into two parts: Part 1 aired from March 17 to April 1, 2022, for 22 episodes, while Part 2 aired from April 4, 2022, to May 18, 2022, for 20 episodes.

== Synopsis ==
Chang Yi, the merman prince of the East Sea, rescued Fairy Shunde when she was in danger at sea. When the kind-hearted Chang Yi sent her back, he was tricked and sent to Wanhua Valley for cruel imprisonment. Ji Yunhe, the protector and spirit master of Wanhua Valley, was controlled by the valley master since childhood. In order to gain freedom, she decided to take a chance and try to tame Chang Yi. During the taming process, Chang Yi and Ji Yunhe gradually fell for each other. After experiencing conspiracy, misunderstanding, meeting and parting, the love between the two, broke through the restraints, went through thousands of difficulties and finally became a couple, and joined hands to save the world.

== Cast and characters ==
=== Main ===
- Dilraba Dilmurat as Ji Yunhe / Ah Ji (voiced by Qiao Shiyu)
  - Kristina as Ji Yunhe / Ah Ji (young)

Spiritual master and guardian of Flower Valley

- Ren Jialun as Chang Yi (voiced by Zhang Jie)

A merman from East Sea who was captured by Fairy Shunde

=== Flower Valley ===
- Xiao Shunyao as Lin Haoqing
  - Xiao Tianren as Lin Haoqing (young)

Young master of Flower Valley

- Hai Yitian as Lin Canglan

Master of Flower Valley

- Hu Yixuan as Luo Jinsang

Ji Yunhe's good friend and attendant. A butterfly spirit

- Fan Zhen as Xue Sanyue

Protector of Flower Valley. Ji Yunhe's ally

- Ci Sha as Li Shu

Xue Sanyue's attendant and lover. A mountain cat spirit

- Wang Junhao as Qu Xiaoxing

Commander of the armed forces. Ji Yunhe's good friend and Lin Haoqing's trusted subordinate

- Lu Yanbei as Qing Shu, Lin Canglan's attendant
- Chen Guanhong as Siyu, Lin Haoqing's attendant
- Guo Xiaoting as Ning Xiyu

Former master of Flower Valley. Ning Qing and Ning Ruochu's master

- Fu Jun as Elder Dong Lian
- Liu Guanghou as Elder Mu Ze
- Yu Qinghui as Elder Liu Ying

=== Immortal Master Mansion ===
- Wang Dong as Ning Qing, immortal master
  - Zhang Yuxuan as Ning Qing (young)
- Guo Xiaoting as Fairy Shunde / Ru Ling, elder sister of the Heavenly Emperor and disciple of Ning Qing
- Li Junxian as Ji Chengyu, disciple of Ning Qing
- Yang Jiahua as Ji Ning, disciple of Ning Qing
- Yu Miao Xin as Envoy Zhang, Fairy Shunde's subordinate
- Wang Shanzhui as Zhu Ling, head of Ling Shuang tower. Fairy Shunde's subordinate

=== North Abyss ===
==== Qing Qiu Fox Tribe ====
- Fu Hongsheng as Qing Xuan, king of the Qing Qiu Fox Tribe
- Wang Yifei as Qing Yao, heiress of the Qing Qiu Fox Tribe
- Sun Chuhong as Qi Feng, Qing Yao's cousin
- Wang Jie as Wei Yan, Qing Yao's attendant

==== Others ====
- Wang Ziteng as Kong Ming, a wandering immortal who was a part of the Immortal Master Mansion
- Li Baoer as Luo Suo, Chang Yi's subordinate

=== Heaven Realm ===
- He Yuxiao as Ru Jun, the Heavenly Emperor
- Tan Kai as Immortal Lord Si Fang
- Zhang Xilin as Immortal Lord He Xu, advisor of the Heavenly Emperor, in charge of mapping the constellations
- Bai Haitao as Immortal Lord Fei Lian, subordinate of the Heavenly Emperor
- Mao Fan as Immortal Lord Lei Ze, subordinate of the Heavenly Emperor

=== Others ===
- He Zhonghua as Merman King, Chang Yi's father
- He Yongsheng as Li Shu's grandfather
- Wang Zun as Da Huan, Li Shu's subordinate
- Jiang Xiao Lin as Xiao Huan, Li Shu's subordinate
- Tong Lei as Qing Ji, Ning Ruochu's lover
- Zheng Guolin as Ning Ruochu, former spiritual master of Flower Valley, Qing Ji's lover
  - Zhang Zi Han as Ning Ruochu (young)
- Sa Dingding as Gu Huo Bird
- Liu Xiangge as Duo Duo
- Yan Lang as Feng Li
- Yan Linfei as Lu Jinyan

== Production ==
Filming of the drama began in Hengdian World Studios on February 16, 2021. The opening ceremony was held on the February 18, and the whole drama shooting was completed on June 6, 2021. On April 15, 2021, main characters of the drama, Dilraba Dilmurat and Ren Jialun jointly attended the 2021 Youku Annual Press Conference to promote the series.

== Soundtrack ==
The Blue Whisper OST (驭鲛记 原声大碟) consisted of 5 tracks, sung by various artists.

No.	English Title	Chinese Title	Artist	Lyricist	Composer	Notes
1	"More Than Blanks"	留白是表白	Jin Zhiwen	Yu Jiang	Sa Dingding	Opening theme
2	"Mermaid Song"	鮫人之歌	Zhou Shen	Yu Jiang	Sa Dingding	Ending theme
3	"Leaping Fish"	魚躍而上	Sa Dingding	Chen Bohe	Sa Dingding	
4	"As You Wish"	如你所想	Mao Buyi	Chen Bohe	Sa Dingding	
5	"As You Wish"	如你所想	Sa Dingding	Chen Bohe	Sa Dingding	
