= Ulterior Motive (film) =

- Film poster
- Traditional Chinese: 別有動機
- Simplified Chinese: 别有动机
- Hanyu Pinyin: Bié Yǒu Dòng Jī
- Jyutping: Bit6 Jau2 Dung6 Gei1
- Directed by: Arthur Wong
- Screenplay by: Jerry Chan; Peng Yanwen
- Produced by: Zhao Qing
- Starring: Gordon Lam; Qin Lan; Simon Yam; Archie Kao; Liu Wei
- Production companies: Beijing CHS Culture; Zhejiang CHS Media; China Movie Channel
- Distributed by: Zhejiang CHS Media; Huayi Brothers; China Film Co. China Film Digital
- Release date: 17 September 2015
- Running time: 100 minutes
- Country: China
- Language: Mandarin

Ulterior Motive is a 2015 Chinese action thriller film directed by cinematographer Arthur Wong and starring Gordon Lam, Qin Lan, Simon Yam, Archie Kao and Liu Wei. The film is Wong's first directorial effort since 1988's In the Line of Duty 3.

== Plot ==
Originally living a happy and stable life, things have become clouded for rich heiress Ye Shuang (Qin Lan) after the unexpected disappearance of her husband Ling Feng (Archie Kao) and daughter. After consulting with her father Ye Cheng (Simon Yam), Shuang decides to call the police, where she re-encounters her ex-boyfriend, Yao Jie (Gordon Lam).

During the investigation process, Jie finds this million-dollar ransom kidnapping case to be a misty mystery. Specializing in investigating by starting from minor details, he targets Cheng as a potential suspect. At this time, Cheng's activities has also become suspiciously strange. When the mystery seemed to have dispersed, Cheng dies from an accident. At this time, clues from a murder case that took place 20 years ago begins to surface. Behind the mysterious kidnappings lies the ulterior motive.

== Cast ==
- Gordon Lam as Yao Jie
- Qin Lan as Ye Shuang
- Simon Yam as Ye Cheng
- Archie Kao as Ling Feng
- Liu Wei as Xiao Xin
- Steven Miao
- Gao Xin as Xiao Qiang
- Qu Qingqing
- Ren Shan
