= Thank You, Doctor =

Chinese drama series

- Written by: Zhou Yong
- Directed by: Zhang Rui
- Starring: Yang Mi; Bai Yu
- Country of origin: China
- Original language: Mandarin

Production
- Production location: China

Original release
- Network: Tencent, IQIYI, CCTV-8
- Release: 4 November – 17 November 2022

Thank You, Doctor
- Simplified Chinese: 谢谢你医生
Transcriptions
Standard Mandarin
- Hanyu Pinyin: Xie Xie Ni Yi Sheng

Thank You, Doctor (Chinese: 谢谢你医生; pinyin: Xie Xie Ni Yi Sheng) is a 2022 Chinese drama series directed by Zhang Rui and written by Zhou Yong. The series stars Yang Mi, Bai Yu, Li Dong Heng, Li Jie, Cristy Guo, and Jiang Rui Jia.

== Synopsis ==
A group of doctors works at a new hospital named EICU. These doctors rely on their expertise to save patients' lives. One of the doctors, named Xiao Yan, has just returned from abroad. Xiao Yan suffered the loss of her fiancé shortly after arriving at the hospital—a tragedy that left her deeply devastated. Nevertheless, Xiao Yan remains meticulous when performing surgeries on her patients. Additionally, she has a partner named Dr. Bai Shu—a tall and imposing figure.

== Cast ==
- Yang Mi as Xiao Yan
- Bai Yu as Bai Zhu
- Guo Xiaoting as Zheng Yajie
- Li Jie
- Li Dongheng
- Jiang Ruijia

== International Broadcast ==
- Tencent
- iQiyi
- CCTV-8
