= Harmony (Sa Dingding album) =

Harmony (天地合)

Studio album by Sa Dingding
- Released: 2010
- Language: Chinese, Sanskrit, English, self-created
- Label: Wrasse Records

Sa Dingding chronology
| Alive (2007) | Harmony (天地合) (2010) | The Coming Ones (恍如来者) (2012) |

Professional ratings
Review scores
| Source | Rating |
|---|---|
| The Guardian | (link) |
| The Independent | (link) |

Harmony (Chinese: 天地合) is a 2010 album by Chinese singer-songwriter Sa Dingding, produced by Marius de Vries and released on Wrasse Records.

== Track listing ==
1. 天地记 (Ha Ha Li Li)
2. 绿衣女孩 (Girl In a Green Dress)
3. 自由行走的花 (Hua)
4. 石榴女人(Pomegranate Woman)
5. 蓝色骏马 (Blue Horse)
6. 云云南南 (Yun Yun Nan Nan)
7. 快乐节 (Xi Carnival)
8. 小树和大树 (Little Tree/Big Tree)
9. 幸运日 (Lucky Day)
10. 希然宁泊·自省.心经 (Xi Ran Ning Po – Introspection)
11. 天地记 (Ha Ha Li Li) – Paul Oakenfold Remix

An expanded version of the album has two further remixes of the first track.
