= Wang Yaoqing =

Taiwanese actor

- 王耀慶
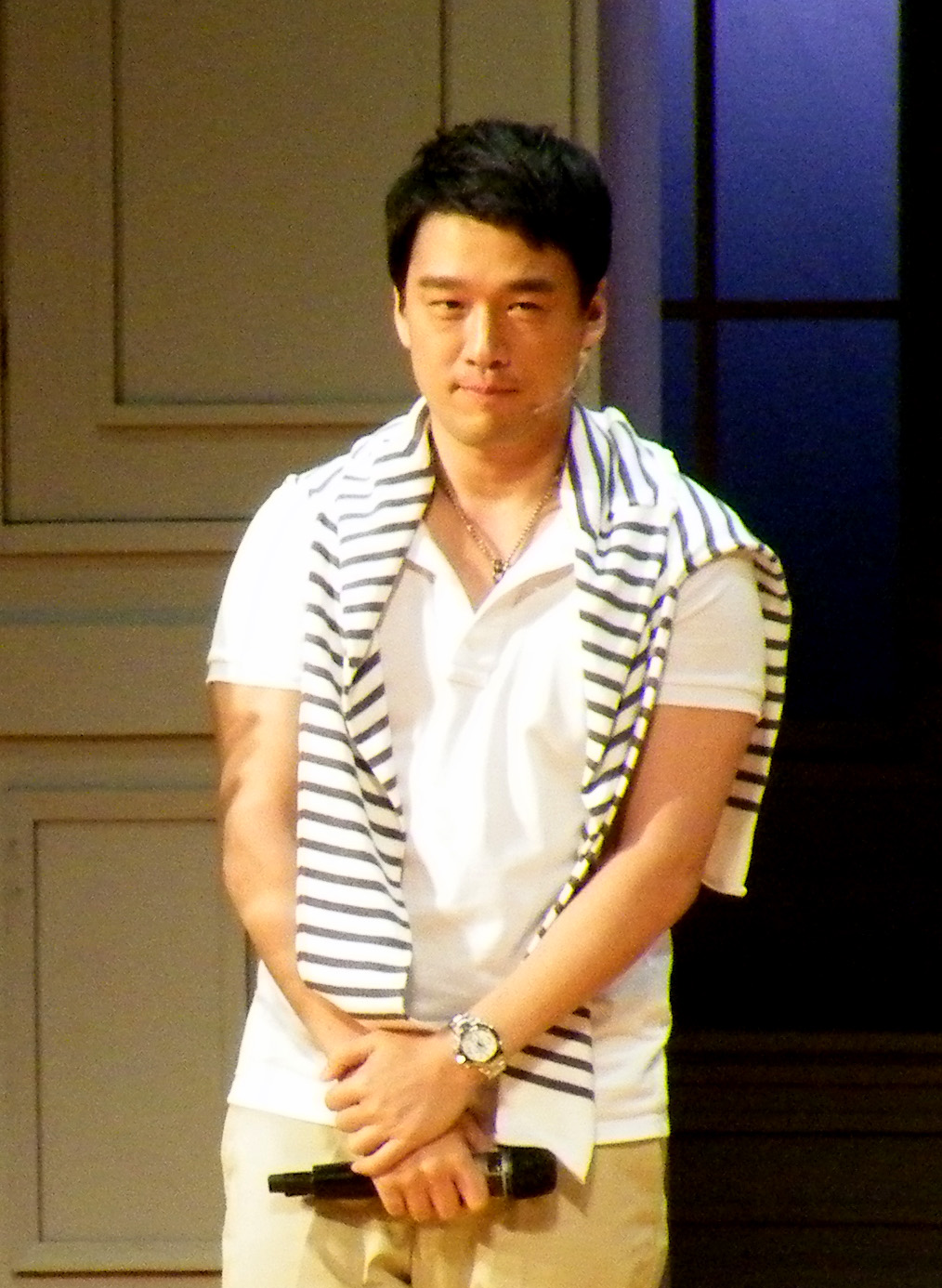
- Wang as cast for theatrical drama The Doppelgänger (红娘的异想世界之在西厢), Beijing, 2011
- Born: July 15, 1974 (age 52); Taipei, Taiwan
- Other name: David Wang
- Education: Fu Jen Catholic University
- Occupation: Actor
- Years active: 1994–present
- Agent: Beijing Junwei Cultural Diffusion Limited Company

Chinese name
- Traditional Chinese: 王耀慶
- Simplified Chinese: 王耀庆
Transcriptions
Standard Mandarin
- Hanyu Pinyin: Wáng Yàoqìng
Southern Min
- Hokkien POJ: Ông Iāu-khèng

Wang Yaoqing (Chinese: 王耀慶; Pe̍h-ōe-jī: Ông Iāu-khèng, born 15 July 1974), also known as David Wang, is a Taiwanese actor.

== Early life and education ==
Wang was born in Taipei on 15 July 1974. He attended the Fu Jen Catholic University, majoring in Mass Communications.

== Career ==
Wang debuted in Taiwanese entertainment and acted in several television series. He became known for his role in the drama Sun Flower. He then acted in several stage plays and established his position in the industry.

In 2011, Wang starred in the hit romance film Love is Not Blind and was nominated for the Best Supporting Actor award at the Hundred Flowers Awards. In 2012, Wang starred in the spy drama Fu Chen and was nominated for the Best Supporting Actor award at the Huading Awards. In 2013, Wang starred in the family drama The Sweet Burden and Little Daddy;. which led to a rise in popularity for Wang. Wang won the Best Actor award at the Macau International Television Festival for his performance in Little Daddy. He then played lead roles in the medical drama Obstetrician, and historical drama Esoterica of Qing Dynasty where he portrayed Qianlong.

In 2016, Wang starred in the slice-of-life romance drama To Be a Better Man, and was named as one of the Audience's Favorite Actors at the Huading Awards. The same year he starred in the family drama Keep the Marriage as Jade and won the Best Supporting Actor award at the Macau International Television Festival.

In 2020, Wang starred in the romantic comedy drama Find Yourself.

== Filmography ==
=== Film ===
Year	English title	Chinese title	Role	Ref.
2000	Bowl	大地之女	Li Shutong	
2008		敬盛堂的春大神	Liu Qichang	
2008	Ghost Resort	鬼旅社	Zhao Xinhai	
2008	Black Clinic	黑道诊所	Zuo Bailong	
2011	Love is Not Blind	失恋33天	Luo Yiran	
2014	The Great Hypnotist	催眠大师	Luo Yusong	
2015	Fall in Love Like a Star	怦然星动	Chen Xuan	
2017	Extraordinary Mission	非凡任务	Luo Dongfang	
2017	Wine War	抢红	Fang Changming	
2018	Project Gutenburg	无双	Li Yongzhe	
2026	Crossing	四渡	Chiang Kai-shek	

=== Television series ===
Year	English title	Chinese title	Role	Notes/Ref.
1994		那一年我们都很酷	Tian Yingmao	
1995	Crystal Flowers	水晶花		
1995	Call Me When Its Morning	天亮叫我	Zhou Jiaxin	
1998	Sunflower	太阳花	Wang Zimin	
1999		君子兰花	Lin Hongxiang	
1999		红颜花	Li Chengen	
1999		孽女花	Kang Xiaodi	
2000	Taiwan Bense	台湾本色		
2001	The World's First Prison	天下第一状	Jin Yanzhi	
2001		烟雨江南	Tian Jiatang	
2001		女生向前走	Dong Zijing	
2001	The Great Talent Qianlong Emperor	才子佳人乾隆皇	Hongshi	
2002		世间子女	Tang Kunshan	
2002	The Pawnshop No. 8	八号风球的爱恋	Wang Yuzhi	
2002		温馨医医世情	Wang Li	
2003	In Love	偷偷爱上你	Eric	
2003	Fall in Love with the President	爱上总经理	Fu Hao	
2003	Just Love	老婆大人	Zhao Dadong	
2003	Taiwan Supernatural Events	台湾灵异事件	Lin Mingyi	
2003	Love is Here	爱情来了	Lin Hao	
2003	Mature Woman's Desire Diary	熟女欲望日记	Ge Ruoxiang	
2003		文英ㄟ厝边	Yao Qing	
2004	Magic Dragon Pearl	魔界之龙珠	Qiu Ruofeng	
2004	Beauty 99	爱情风暴─美丽99	Gao Qun	
2004	Died has all had to Love	死了都要爱	Zhuang Lixin	
2004	Top on the Forbidden City	紫禁之巅	Sheng Ge	
2005	Beautiful Clinic	好美丽诊所	Zeng Daqing	
2005	A Famous Physician Song Lian Sheng	宋连生坐堂	Lu Xuan	
2006	Unique Flavor	天下第一味	Chen Shengchang	
2006	The Magicians of Love	爱情魔发师	Daniel	
2006	Taipei Family	住左边住右边	Daniel	
2007	I Shall Succeed	我一定要成功	Zhou Guohao	
2010	Calling For Love	呼叫大明星	Lin Qinhong	
2012	Master Lin in Seoul	林师傅在首尔	Fu Jinkuang	
2012	Go Lala Go!	杜拉拉升职记	Wang Wei	
2012	Fu Chen	浮沉	Lu Fan	
2013	The Sweet Burden	小儿难养	Yan Daoxin	
2013	Little Daddy	小爸爸	Qin Le	
2014	Marriage Battle	婚战	Wei Hao	Cameo
2014	Song of Vengeance	唱战记	Qi Cheng	
2014	Obstetrician	产科医生	Xiao Cheng	
2014	He and His Sons	半路父子	Gao Feng	Cameo
2015	Esoterica of Qing Dynasty	乾隆秘史	Qianlong	
2015	The Revolution in Shanghai	大江东去	Zheng Damin	
2015	Junior Parents	小爸妈	Gao Jian	
2015	Graduation Song	毕业歌	Hong Wangnan	
2016	Keep the Marriage as Jade	守婚如玉	He Jian	
2016	Still Lala	我是杜拉拉	Wang Wei	
2016	To Be a Better Man	好先生	Jiang Haoshen	
2017	Fighting Time	职场是个技术活	Shen Zhizhe	
2017	Best Arrangement	最好的安排	Yan Ruozhuo	
2017	Love is the Source of Joy	爱是欢乐的源泉	Zhang Hongguang	
2018	Women in Beijing	北京女子图鉴	Xu Siming	
2018	Lost in 1949	脱身	Zhang Xiaoguang	
2018	Entrepreneurial Age	创业时代	Li Benteng	
2019	Dear Marriage	亲爱的婚姻	Cheng Dacheng	
2019	Orange Street Favorite Boys	桔子街的断货男	Li Dahuo	
2019	The Chinese Dream	梦在海这边	Qin Le	Cameo
2020	Find Yourself	下一站是幸福	Ye Luming	
2020	Court Battle	决胜法庭	Deng Kaiwen	
2020	Jian Ai Nan Nu	鉴爱男女		Cameo
2020	Beautiful Reborn Flower	彼岸花	An Kailun	
2020	We Are All Alone	怪你过分美丽	Yu Jiang	
2020	Love Yourself	他其实没有那么爱你	Lu Hao	
2023	Only for Love	以爱为营	Qin Xiaoming	
TBA	Simmer Down	好好说话	Li Hengji	
TBA	Pride and Price	盛装	Xiang Tingfeng	

== Awards and nominations ==
Year	Event	Category	Nominated work	Result	Ref.
2011	31st Hundred Flowers Awards	Best Supporting Actor	Love is Not Blind	Nominated	
2012	8th Huading Awards	Best Supporting Actor	Fu Chen	Nominated	
2013	19th Shanghai Television Festival	Most Popular Actor	The Sweet Burden	Nominated	
2013	4th Macau International Television Festival	Best Actor	Little Daddy	Won	
2016	19th Huading Awards	Audience's Favorite Actor	—N/a	Won	
2016	6th Macau International Television Festival	Best Supporting Actor	Keep The Marriage As Jade	Won	
