= Destiny by Love =

- Starring: Alec Su; Qin Lan
- Country of origin: China
- Original language: Mandarin
- No. of episodes: 30

Production
- Running time: 45 minutes

Destiny by Love is a 2013 Chinese romantic comedy television series produced by Alec Su, starring Su and Qin Lan as two unmarried people in their thirties. It is based on a popular online novel The New Leftover Woman Era (新剩女时代).

The series marks Su's production debut.

== Cast ==
- Alec Su
- Qin Lan
- Xiong Naijin
- Shaun Tam
