= The Coming Ones =

The Coming Ones (恍如来者)

Studio album by Sa Dingding
- Released: July 3, 2012
- Language: Chinese

Sa Dingding chronology
Alive (2010)	The Coming Ones (恍如来者) (2012)	Wonderland (2014)

The Coming Ones (Chinese: 恍如來者; pinyin: Huǎngrú Láizhě) is the third album by Chinese singer-songwriter Sa Dingding. Separate versions were released for the China and international markets.

The Coming Ones includes traditional music from southwest China, as well as villagers of Xiaoshuijing singing Beethoven's Ninth Symphony. The album also includes music created in collaboration with Paul Oakenfold. Some songs are accompanied by music played on ancient instruments.

Some of the material on this album was reworked and included on the musician's later album Beyond Convention.

== Version differences ==
Several differences exist between the initial release and international release of the album. The cover of the original release features an image of Sa Dingding with an elderly Tibetan woman. The international version of the album only features the artist in a folded-hand gesture.

The international version also reorders most of the tracks and replaces the track "Zhen Zhi Yan" (真之言) with "Peacock" and removes the track "Xing Zhe Wu Jiang" (行者無疆).

Stylistic differences between albums also results in difference of track lengths.

== Track listing ==
No.	Title	Music	Length
1.	"來者摩羯"	Sa Dingding	04:58
2.	"如影隨形"	Ludwig van Beethoven, Sa Dingding	4:19
3.	"塵埃在歌唱"	Sa Dingding	3:59
4.	"恍如隔世"	Sa Dingding	4:35
5.	"致尚愛"	Sa Dingding	4:39
6.	"愛在2012"	Bo Peng	3:27
7.	"轉山"		3:01
8.	"秋香月"	Sa Dingding	04:16
9.	"真之言"		05:44
10.	"行者無疆"	Sa Dingding	4:09
11.	"天籟之愛"	Sa Dingding	4:02

== Track listing (International release) ==
No.	Title	Music	Length
1.	"天籟之愛" (The Holy Sound Of Love)	Sa Dingding	3:55
2.	"如影隨形" (Something Like A Shadow Is Following You)	Ludwig van Beethoven, Sa Dingding	4:16
3.	"來者摩羯" (Capricorn)	Sa Dingding	05:18
4.	"雀神" (Peacock)	Sa Dingding	4:49
5.	"秋鄉月" (The Fragrance Of The Autumn Moon)	Sa Dingding	04:31
6.	"致尚愛" (Dedicated With Love)	Sa Dingding	4:17
7.	"愛在2012" (The Love In 2012)	Bo Peng	3:08
8.	"恍如隔世" (The Mystery Of Time)	Sa Dingding	4:33
9.	"塵埃在歌唱" (The Fragments Are Singing)	Sa Dingding	4:14
10.	"轉山" (Walking Around The Mountain (feat: Paul Oakenfold))	Cang Yang Jia Cuo, Sa Dingding, Ian Green, Paul Oakenfold	3:02
