= Xin Zhilei =

Chinese actress (born 1986)

- 辛芷蕾
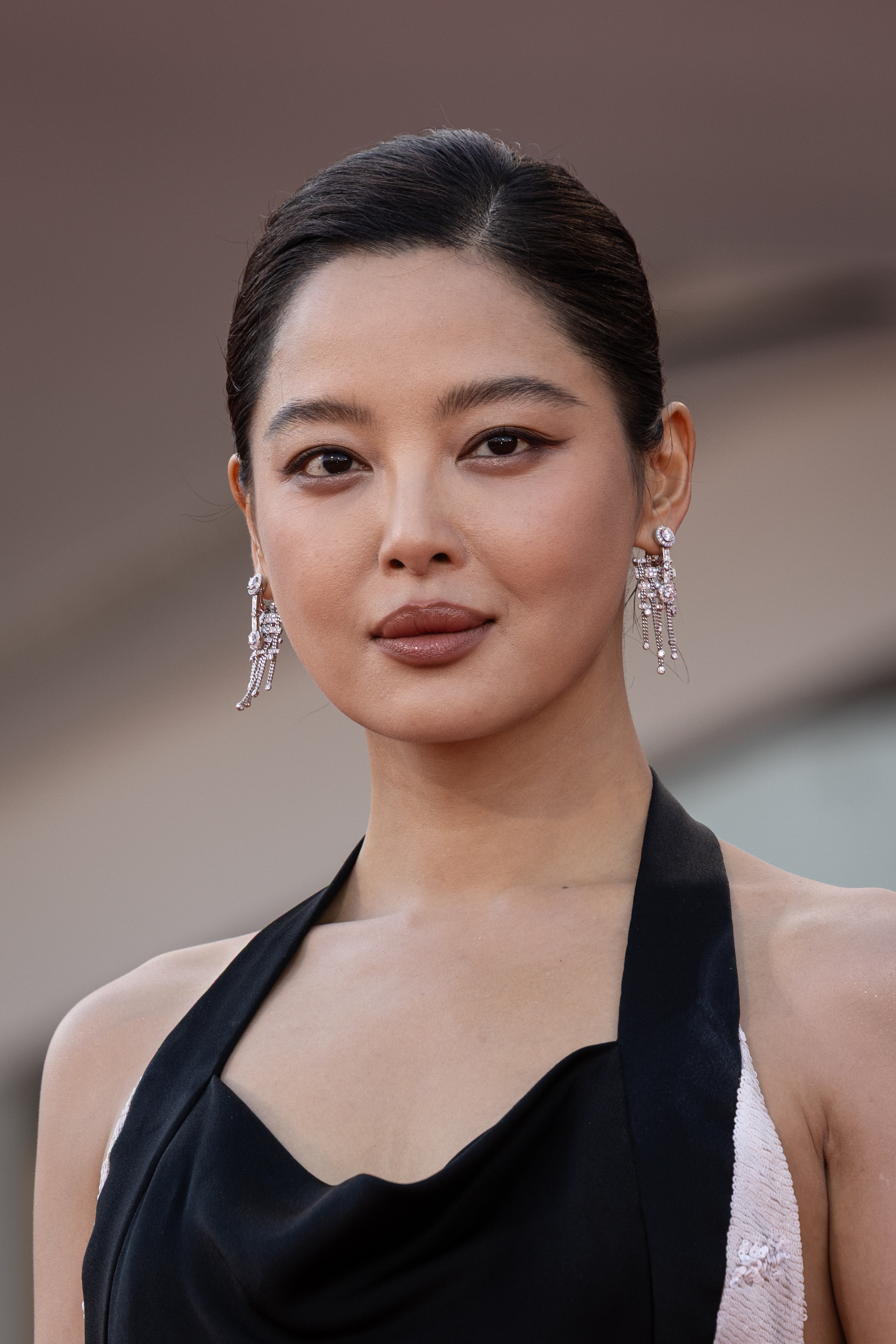
- Xin at the 2025 Venice International Film Festival
- Born: Xin Lei (辛蕾); April 8, 1986 (age 40); Hegang, Heilongjiang, China
- Education: Harbin Huade University (dropout); Central Academy of Drama (training program)
- Occupation: Actress
- Years active: 2011–present
- Agent: Yun Zhi He Entertainment (New Classics Media)
- Awards: Volpi Cup for Best Actress at the 82nd Venice International Film Festival

Xin Zhilei (Chinese: 辛芷蕾; pinyin: Xīn Zhǐlěi; born Xin Lei [辛蕾; Xīn Lěi] on April 8, 1986) is a Chinese actress. She is known for her roles in the television series Ruyi's Royal Love in the Palace (2018), Joy of Life (2019), and Blossoms Shanghai (2023). Her notable films include Crosscurrent (2016), Brotherhood of Blades II: The Infernal Battlefield (2017), and The Sun Rises on Us All (2025), for which she won the Volpi Cup for Best Actress at the 82nd Venice International Film Festival.

== Early life ==
Xin was born into a modest family in Hegang, Heilongjiang, where both of her parents suffered from poor health. She was originally given the name Xin Rui (辛蕊; Xīn Ruǐ) by her mother, but when registering her on the hukou, her mother forgot how to write the character Rui and instead changed it to Lei. Xin started cooking and helped care for her younger brother and sister since the age of six. While she studied fashion design at Harbin Huade University, her father became paralyzed, and Xin took on part-time jobs to support the household. Her father remained paralyzed for five years before his death.

== Career ==
While studying fashion design in Harbin, Xin began working as a model. A teacher recommended her to serve as a ritual girl for a TV station, where she was noticed by Donnie Yen and his then advertising agent in mainland China, Liang Ting. In 2007, Xin signed with Liang's agency, Star Union Skykee, after which she adopted the stage name Zhilei, originally suggested by a fortune-teller as Zilei (紫蕾; Zǐlěi) before being modified by Liang. Xin appeared in a 2008 advertisement with Tony Leung, directed by Stanley Kwan and shot by William Chang. In the same year, she enrolled in a six-month training program at Central Academy of Drama.

In 2011, Xin made her acting debut in the television drama Painted Skin (2011). In the same year, she was cast as the lead actress of Crosscurrent (2016), which languished for years because of budget overruns before Xin gained recognition for the film when it was selected to compete for the Golden Bear at the 66th Berlin International Film Festival. In 2016, she joined New Classics Media, which cast her in the TV series Ruyi's Royal Love in the Palace (2018), a sequel to the popular Empresses in the Palace (2011). In 2017, Xin appeared in Lu Yang's wuxia film Brotherhood of Blades II: The Infernal Battlefield, which attracted Wang Kar-wai's attention. Xin gained wider popularity with her supporting roles in Ruyi's Royal Love in the Palace (2018) and Joy of Life (2019), both produced by her agency New Classics Media.

In 2021, Xin was announced to have joined the cast of Blossoms Shanghai, the first television series directed by Wong Kar-wai. The series premiered in December 2023 to critical acclaim. Earlier in 2023, Xin starred in the Chinese adaptation of Prima Facie, a one-woman play written by Australian playwright Suzie Miller. Her performance in this play earned her a Shanghai Magnolia Stage Performance Award. Xin starred in Cai Shangjun's film The Sun Rises on Us All (2025), which premiered at the 82nd Venice International Film Festival and earned Xin the Volpi Cup for Best Actress.

== Endorsements ==
In 2019, Xin became a brand ambassador for L'Oréal and a womenswear ambassador for Descente, and appeared in a Lindt campaign with Swiss tennis player Roger Federer. In 2020, Xin became a brand ambassador for Chanel. In 2021, Xin became a brand ambassador for Montblanc. In 2022, Xin became a brand ambassador for Sephora. In 2024, Xin became a brand ambassador for Estée Lauder and Roger Vivier.

== Personal life ==
From 2018 to 2024, Xin was in a relationship with actor Zhai Tianlin.

In 2023, Xin disclosed on Weibo that she had experienced molestation in childhood, writing: "I spent the next twenty years healing myself, and my brain would even actively erase that terrifying memory."

== Controversy ==
=== Contractual dispute ===
In June 2015, after years of financial difficulties and a stalled career, Xin sought to terminate her contract with her first agent Liang Ting after 8 years over the latter's alleged "inaction", leading to a public contractual dispute. In September of the same year, Xin filed a lawsuit against Liang, but ultimately lost the case and was ordered to pay damages for breach of contract. In September 2025, after her win of the Volpi Cup for Best Actress at the 82nd Venice International Film Festival, Xin reestablished contact with Liang and the two publicly reconciled on Weibo.

== Filmography ==
=== Film ===
Year	English title	Chinese title	Role	Notes
2012	Haunting Love	诡爱	Xiao Xiaoya	Segment: Love Drift
2013	Bunshinsaba 2	笔仙II	Nana	
2015	Impossible	不可思异	Tian Jing	
2016	Crosscurrent	长江图	An Lu	
2016	Blood of Youth	少年	Cellist	Cameo
2017	Brotherhood of Blades II: The Infernal Battlefield	绣春刀II：修罗战场	Ding Baiying	
2020	Yes, I Do!	我的女友是机器人	Chuyi	
2020	The Rescue	紧急救援	Fang Yuling	
2021	Schemes in Antiques	古董局中局	Huang Yanyan	
2023	Various Geeks	失而复得	Feng Leqi	
2024	Upstream	逆行人生	Xiao Ni	
2024	The Unseen Sister	乔妍的心事	Qiao Lin	
2025	You Are the Best	你行！你上！	Teacher Lin	
2025	A Writer's Odyssey 2	刺杀小说家2	Ruyun Long	
2025	The Sun Rises on Us All	日掛中天	Meiyun	
TBA	The Perfect Blue	她杀	Fang Yan	

=== Television ===
Year	English title	Chinese title	Role	Ref.
2011	Painted Skin	画皮	Susu	
2012	Fall in Love with You	偏偏爱上你	Li Jiaxuan	
2013	Woman Gang	女人帮	Gao Xinxin	
2014	Miss Dong	懂小姐	Miss Dong's close friend	
2015	Wang Dahua Revolutionary Career	王大花的革命生涯	Jia Jiafeng	
2015	Hua Xu Yin: City of Desperate Love	华胥引之绝爱之城	Nangong Qing	
2015	Embrace the Stars of the Moon	拥抱星星的月亮	Xia Mingyue	
2018	Mr. Right	恋爱先生	Gu Yao	
2018	Happiness Chocolate	幸福巧克力	Zhong Ququ	
2018	Battle Through the Heavens	斗破苍穹	Medusa	
2018	Ruyi's Royal Love in the Palace	如懿传	Jin Yuyan	
2019	Candle in the Tomb: The Wrath of Time	怒晴湘西	Miss Hong	
2019	Over the Sea I Come to You	带着爸爸去留学	Lin Feng	
2019	Joy of Life	庆余年	Haitang Duoduo	
2020	The Wolf	狼殿下	Yao Ji	
2021	Win the Future	输赢	Luo Jia	
2022	I Am a Super Star	超时空大玩家	Rao Aimin / Wang Sisi	
2023	In Spite of the Strong Wind	纵有疾风起	Lu Di	
2023	Blossoms Shanghai	繁花	Li Li	
2024	Joy of Life 2	庆余年（第二季）	Haitang Duoduo	
2024	Lost Identity	孤战迷城	Qin Moqing	
2025	Good Will Society	仁心俱乐部	Liu Ziyi	
2026	The Inner Eye	女神蒙上眼	Tang Yingying	
2026	Remnants of Gold	金色	Zhang Luyao	

=== Theatre ===
Year	English title	Chinese title	Role
2023	Prima Facie	初步举证	Tessa Ensler
2024	Prima Facie	初步举证	Tessa Ensler

=== Reality shows ===
Year	English title	Chinese title	Role
2017	The Birth of an Actor	演员的诞生	Contestant
2023	Divas Hit the Road 5	花儿与少年·丝路季	
2025	Amazing Night 2	喜人奇妙夜2	Judge

== Awards and nominations ==
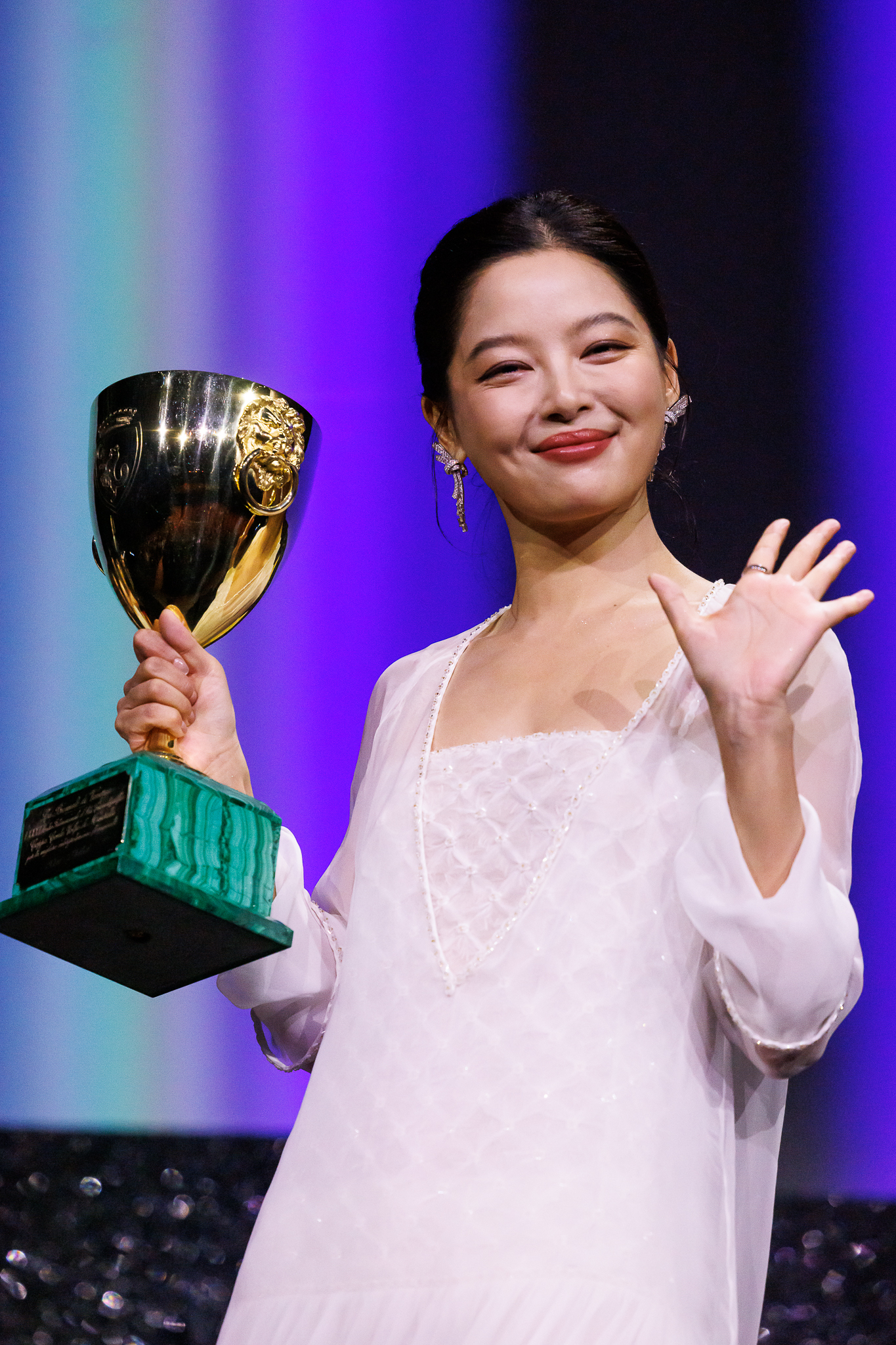
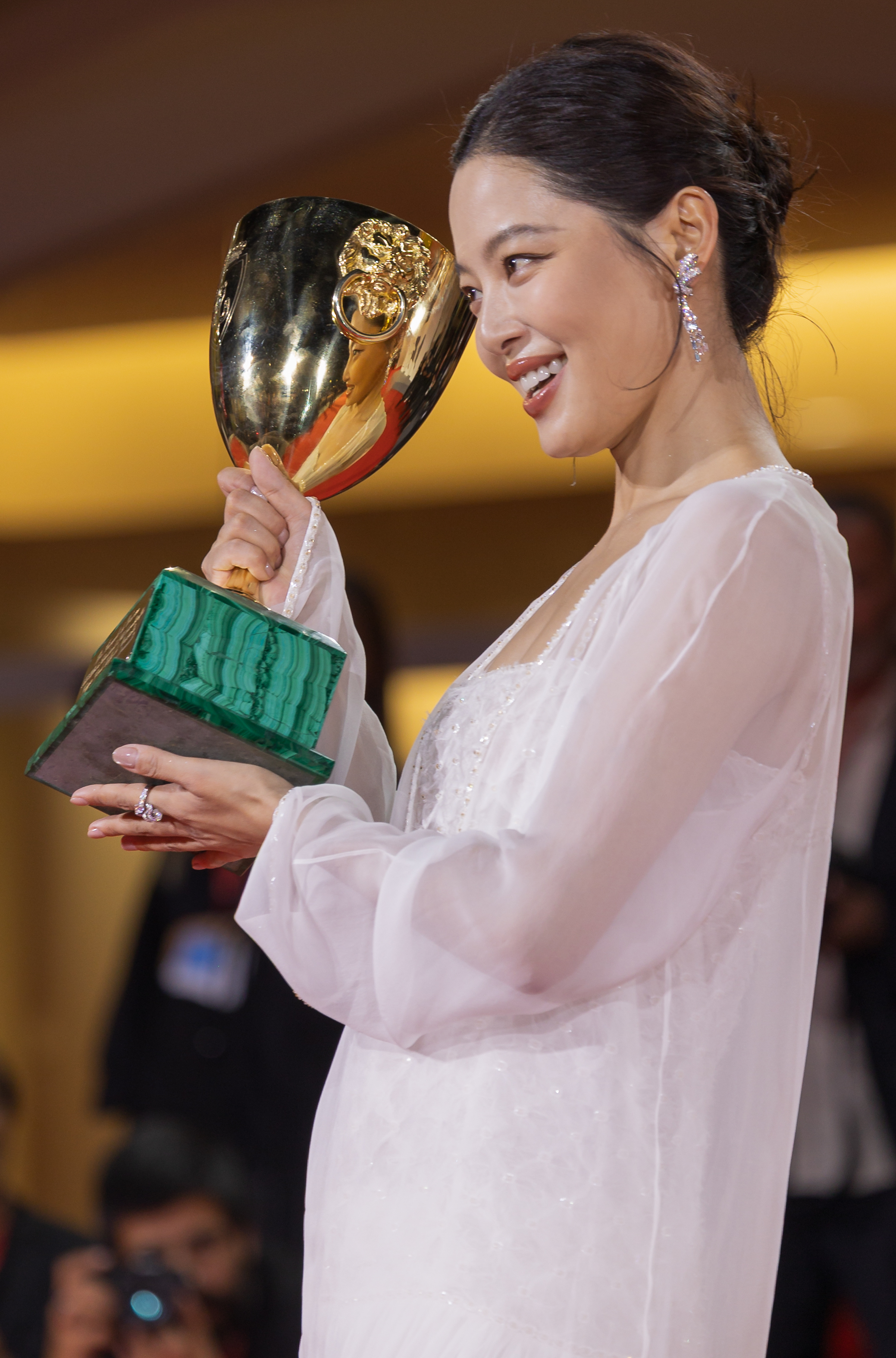
Xin receiving the Volpi Cup for Best Actress award at the 82nd Venice International Film Festival in 2025.

Year	Award	Category	Nominated work	Result	Ref.
2019	26th Huading Awards	Best Actress (Period drama)	Candle in the Tomb: The Wrath of Time	Nominated	
2019	Golden Bud - The Fourth Network Film And Television Festival	Best Actress	Candle in the Tomb: The Wrath of Time, Over The Sea I Come To You	Nominated	
2023	7th Chinese Theatre Awards	Best Actress	Prima Facie	Won	
2024	32nd Shanghai Magnolia Stage Performance Awards	Best Leading Performance	Prima Facie	Won	
2025	82nd Venice International Film Festival	Volpi Cup for Best Actress	The Sun Rises on Us All	Won	
2025	18th Asia Pacific Screen Awards	Best Performance	The Sun Rises on Us All	Nominated	
2026	17th China Film Director's Guild Awards	Best Actress	The Sun Rises on Us All	Won	
