= Sa Dingding =

Chinese folk singer and songwriter (born 1983)

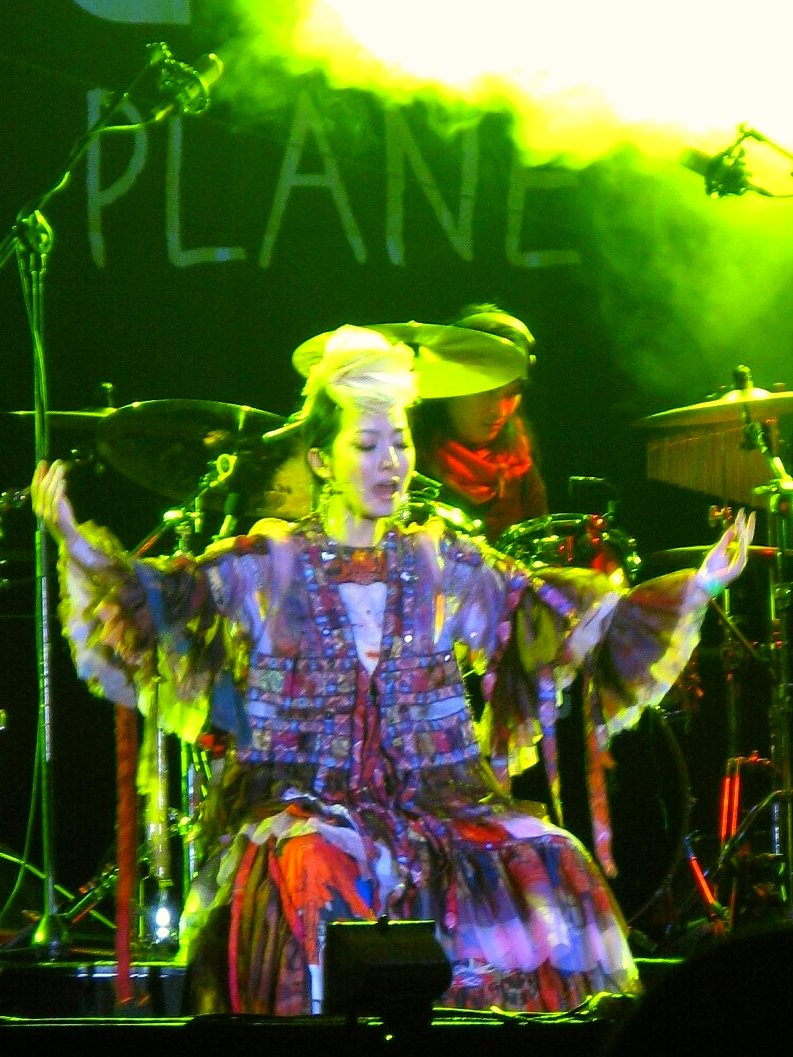
- Sa in concert in 2009
- Born: Zhou Peng (周鹏); 27 December 1983 (age 42); Pingdingshan, Henan
- Occupations: Singer; composer; songwriter; record producer; choreographer; actress
- Years active: 2000–present
- Musical career
- Genres: World music; world fusion; electronic; folk; pop
- Instruments: Guzheng; morin khuur
- Labels: Wrasse; Universal

Chinese name
- Traditional Chinese: 薩頂頂
- Simplified Chinese: 萨顶顶
Transcriptions
Standard Mandarin
- Hanyu Pinyin: Sà Dǐngdǐng

Zhou Peng (周鹏, born 27 December 1983), known professionally as Sa Dingding (simplified Chinese: 萨顶顶; traditional Chinese: 薩頂頂; pinyin: Sà Dǐngdǐng), is a Chinese folk singer and songwriter. Of mixed Han Chinese and Mongol ancestry, she sings in several languages, including Mandarin Chinese, English, Standard Tibetan, as well as an imaginary self-created language to evoke emotions in her songs. She also plays traditional instruments such as the guzheng and morin khuur.

== Early life and education ==
Sa was born in Pingdingshan, Henan, on 27 December 1983. She became interested in Buddhism and taught herself Tibetan and Sanskrit. Later, at 17, she moved to Beijing, to study music at the People's Liberation Army Academy of Art.

== Career ==
At age 18, she released her first album entitled Dong Ba La under her birth name Zhou Peng, gaining her the title of China's Best Dance Music Singer.

In 2006, "Holy Incense" was used as the theme song for the movie Prince of the Himalayas, directed by Sherwood Hu. In mid-2007, she released Alive, available physically and as a download in many countries. The Hong Kong release of the album featured a DVD containing music videos, a remix of "Alive", making of footage and a Chinese version of "Mama Tian Na", not featured on the album.

In 2008, at the age of 25, she won the BBC Radio 3 Awards for World Music for the Asia-Pacific region, earning herself the chance to perform at the Royal Albert Hall to a Western audience. In the same year, she also released a two track single called "Qin Shang".

Sa composed a song with Éric Mouquet of Deep Forest called "Won't Be Long" to raise funds for disaster relief after the 2008 Sichuan earthquake. The song was made available on Mouquet's Deep-Projects website. Mouquet and Sa have collaborated on an album Deep China.

Sa has appeared at the World of Music, Arts and Dance and the Harrogate International Festivals in the UK. On 6 October 2008, her official English website was updated with information about a European tour, going from 7 to 17 November, making stops in Germany, London, Paris, Amsterdam, Las Palmas, Australia and New Zealand. For Chinese composer He Xuntian's 2008 album, Tathāgata, Sa contributed the vocals for the second track, entitled "Dátǎjiādá" (达塔伽达).

Her January 2010 album was Harmony (天地合), with nine songs in Chinese. The album also contains three remixes of the title track, one by Paul Oakenfold. In 2018, Sa starred in the hit fantasy romance drama Ashes of Love, portraying the Immortal Yuanji.

== Discography ==
Albums

- Dong Ba La (咚巴啦) (2001)
- Alive (万物生) – Universal Music, Wrasse Records (2007)
- Harmony (天地合) (2010)
- The Coming Ones (恍如来者) (2012)
- Wonderland (幻境) (Remix Album) (2014)
- The Butterfly Dream (庄周梦蝶集) (2015)

Singles

- "Qin Shang" (琴伤) – Wrasse Records (2008)
- "Tiandi Ji"/"Ha Ha Li Li" (天地记) – Universal Music Group (2009)

Soundtracks

- Theme song of 14 Blades (锦衣卫)
- "Upwards to the Moon" (左手指月) (2018) – Ashes of Love
- "Unsullied" (不染) (2018) – Ashes of Love
- "When Meeting You" (当遇见你) (2020) – Skate into Love
- "If You Come Back" (如若归来) (2021) – The Long Ballad
- "As You Wish" (2022) – The Blue Whisper

== Filmography ==
=== Television series ===
Year	English title	Chinese title	Role	Notes
2018	Ashes of Love	香蜜沉沉烬如霜	Immortal Yuanji	
2021	The Long Ballad	长歌行	Lady Jingdan	
2023	The Starry Love	星落凝成糖	Immortal Quan He	
