= Crosscurrent (film) =

2016 film

- Chinese: 长江图
- Directed by: Yang Chao
- Written by: Yang Chao
- Produced by: Wang Yu; Yang Jing; Ha Bo
- Starring: Qin Hao; Xin Zhilei
- Cinematography: Mark Lee Ping-Bing
- Edited by: Yang Mingming; Kong Jinlei
- Music by: An Wei
- Production companies: Trend Cultural Investment Co. Ray Production; Just Show Production Beijing; Shandong Jiabo Culture Development Co.
- Release date: 15 February 2016 (Berlinale)
- Running time: 116 minutes
- Country: China
- Language: Mandarin

Crosscurrent (Chinese: Chang Jiang Tu) is a 2016 Chinese drama film directed by Yang Chao. It was selected to compete for the Golden Bear at the 66th Berlin International Film Festival. At Berlin Mark Lee Ping-Bing won the Silver Bear for Outstanding Artistic Contribution for Cinematography.

== Plot ==
Captain Gao Chun goes ashore to find affairs during the time he pilots a cargo ship along the Yangtze River. However, he gradually discovers that the women he meets at different docks seems to be the same person, An Lu. As the voyage continues upstream, An Lu is gentle at times and sometimes unpredictable, yet she grows younger and younger. Gao Chun falls in love with An Lu, stops the boat to meet her, and slowly realizes that An Lu's appearances are connected to a handwritten poem of an unknown author.

However, after the ship passes the Three Gorges, An Lu no longer appears. Gao Chun frantically searches for her, uncovering clues hidden in the poetry and route maps. Meanwhile, changes occur on the ship, but he still desperately drives the cargo ship alone and continues to trace the Yangtze River until he reaches its source in the snowy mountain. Finally, he discovers the origin of An Lu and the secret of the Yangtze River.

== Cast ==
- Qin Hao as Gao Chun
- Xin Zhilei as An Lu
- Wu Lipeng as Wu Sheng
- Wang Hongwei as Hong Wei
- Jiang Hualin as Uncle Xiang

== Reception ==
Maggie Lee of Variety called the film a "gorgeously shot meditation on the Yangtze River [that] all but drowns in pretentious symbolism and philosophical musings." Deborah Young of The Hollywood Reporter said of the film: "Beautiful romanticism in search of a narrative shore." Lee Marshall of Screen Daily called the film "a meandering, sluggish tale that offers moments of great beauty but ultimately feels like a ragbag, take-your-pick bundle of poetic and spiritual suggestions inspired by China’s great Yangtze River."
