= Alive (Sa Dingding album) =

Studio album by Sa Dingding
- Released: June 25, 2007 (Japan); August 17, 2007 (Korea); August 23, 2007 (Hong Kong); April 14, 2008 (UK); May 9, 2008 (Germany); July 29, 2008 (USA)
- Length: 44:31
- Languages: Chinese, Sanskrit, Tibetan, Laghu, and a constructed language
- Label: Universal Music Group

Sa Dingding chronology
Dong Ba La (2001)	Alive (2007)	Harmony (2010)

Professional ratings
Review scores
Source	Rating
AllMusic	3.5/5 stars
The Guardian	4/5 stars

Alive (Chinese: 万物生; pinyin: Wànwùshēng) is the second album by Chinese folk singer Sa Dingding, released in 2007.

On Alive, Sa Dingding sings in Mandarin Chinese, Sanskrit, Standard Tibetan, the nearly extinct Laghu language and an imaginary self-created language to evoke the emotions in her songs.

== Track listing ==
No.	Title	Music	Length
1.	"妈妈天那（藏文）" (Mama Tian Na (Tibetan Version))	Sa Dingding, Huang Yi	5:02
2.	"万物生（梵文）" (Alive (Sanskrit))	Sa Dingding, Huang Yi	4:37
3.	"神香（藏文）" (Holy Incense (Tibetan Version))	He Xuntian	5:54
4.	"锡林河边的老人（自语）" (Oldster By Xilin River (Self-Created Language))	Zhang Hongguang	4:00
5.	"陀罗尼（梵文）" (Tuo Luo Ni (Sanskrit))	Sa Dingding	5:08
6.	"拉古拉古（自语）" (Lagu Lagu (Self-Created Language))	Zhang Hongguang	3:37
7.	"飞鸟和花（中文）" (Flickering With Blossoms (Chinese Version))	Sa Dingding	4:03
8.	"神香（中文）" (Holy Incense (Chinese Version))	He Xuntian	4:15
9.	"万物生（中文）" (Alive (Chinese Version))	Sa Dingding, Huang Yi	4:37
10.	"琴伤（中文）" (Qin Shang (Chinese version))	Sa Dingding	3:13

== DVD Track listing ==
Available on the Hong Kong release only.

1. "Mama Tian Na (Chinese version)" MV
2. "Mama Tian Na (Mantra)" MV
3. "Alive (Chinese Version)" MV
4. "Alive (Vajrasattva Mantra)" MV
5. "Alive" Making Of MV
6. "Alive (Dispop Remix)" [audio]

== Track listing (Japanese release) ==
No.	Title	Music	Length
1.	"ママ・テン・ナ (Mantra)" (Mama Tian Na (Mantra))	Sa Dingding, Huang Yi	5:02
2.	"アライブ (Mantra)" (Alive (Mantra))	Sa Dingding, Huang Yi	4:37
3.	"聖なる香り (Tibet Version)" (Seinaru Kaori (Tibet Version))	He Xuntian	5:54
4.	"錫林河の辺にいる老人 (Self-created Language)" (Suzu Hayashi Kawa no Hen ni Iru Roujin (Self-Created Language))	Zhang Hongguang	4:00
5.	"トオ・ロ・ニ (Sanskrit)" (Tuo Luo Ni (Sanskrit))	Sa Dingding	5:08
6.	"ラグ・ラグ (Self-created Language)" (Lagu Lagu (Self-Created Language))	Zhang Hongguang	3:37
7.	"そよぐ花々 (Chinese Version)" (Soyogu Hanabana (Chinese Version))	Sa Dingding	4:03
8.	"聖なる香り (Chinese Version)" (Seinaru Kaori (Chinese Version))	He Xuntian	4:15
9.	"アライブ (Chinese Version)" (Alive (Chinese Version))	Sa Dingding, Huang Yi	4:37
10.	"傷ついた琴 (Chinese Version)" (Kizutsuita Koto (Chinese Version))	Sa Dingding	3:13

== Album credits ==
- "Mama Tian Na (Tibet Version)"
  - Lyrics: Qi Qing Shang Shi
  - Composer: Sa Dingding, Huang Yi
  - Arranger: Huang Yi, Sa Dingding
- "Alive (Mantra)"
  - Lyrics: Jin Gang Sa Duo Bai Zi Ming Zhou
  - Composer: Sa Dingding, Huang Yi
  - Arranger: Huang Yi, Sa Dingding
  - Guzheng: Name Unknown
  - Bass: Wang Xiaodong
  - Guitars: Yang Jianfeng
  - Background vocals: Huang Yi
- "Holy Incense (Tibet Version)"
  - Lyrics: He Xuntian
  - Composer: He Xuntian
  - Arranger: He Xuntian
  - Production assistant: Ge Yi Qian
  - Bamboo flute: Tang Jun Qiao
  - Percussion: Su Ma
  - Male vocal: Huo Yonggang
  - Chorus: Zatu Vocal Ensemble
- "Oldster by Xilin River (Self-created Language)"
  - Lyrics: Sa Ding DIng
  - Composer: Zhang Hongguang
  - Arranger: Ma Li
  - Horse-head fiddle: Si Ri Gu Leng
- "Tuo Luo Ni (Sanskrit)"
  - Lyrics: Bao Qie Yin Tuo Luo Ni
  - Composer: Sa Dingding
  - Arranger: Huang Yi, Sa Dingding
- "Lagu Lagu (Self-created Language)"
  - Lyrics: Sa Dingding
  - Composer: Zhang Hongguang
  - Arranger: Ma Li, Peng Bo
- "Flickering With Blossoms (Chinese version)"
  - Lyrics: Xiang Die
  - Composer: Sa Dingding
  - Arranger: Ma Li
- "Holy Incense (Chinese version)"
  - Lyrics: He Xuntian
  - Composer: He Xuntian
  - Arranger: He Xuntian
  - Production assistant: Ge Yi Qian
  - Bamboo flute: Tang Jun Qiao
  - Percussion: Su Ma
  - Chorus: Zatu Vocal Ensemble
- "Alive (Chinese version)"
  - Lyrics: Gao Xiao Song
  - Composer: Sa Dingding, Huang Yi
  - Arranger: Huang Yi, Sa Dingding
  - Bass: Wang Xiaodong
  - Guitars: Yang Jianfeng
- "Qin Shang (Chinese version)"
  - Lyrics: Sa Dingding
  - Composer: Sa Dingding
  - Arranger: Peng Bo
  - Keyboard: Peng Bo
