= Zhang Kaili =

Chinese actress

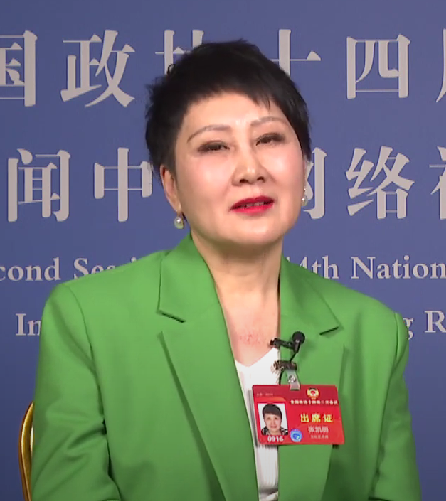
- Zhang in 2024
- Born: September 29, 1962 (age 63); Ji Lin Chang Chun

Zhang Kaili (born September 29, 1962) is a Chinese actress from Changchun, Jilin Province. She is a member of the Central Experimental Drama Troupe and has served as a member of the 13th and 14th National Committee of the Chinese People's Political Consultative Conference (CPPCC). In 1990, she rose to nationwide fame with her performance in the TV drama Ke Wang, which earned her the China TV Golden Eagle Awards for Best Actress.

== Early life and career ==
At the age of 16, Zhang Kaili was selected by the military and worked as a guide at the Military Museum of the Chinese People's Revolution. She later changed her career path after seeing an admission notice for the acting program at the Drama Department of Jilin Art Institute. During her studies, she performed well academically and, after graduation, spent several years working in stage drama.

In 1987, she appeared in the film 《Eight Women Throwing Themselves into the River》, marking her entry into the entertainment industry.

In 1989, China Central Television (CCTV) began casting for 《Kewang 》, the country's first indoor drama series. Zhang Kaili stood out among the candidates and was chosen to play Liu Huifang, a gentle and virtuous character markedly different from her own bold and outgoing personality. When the series aired the following year, it caused a sensation across mainland China, propelling Zhang to overnight fame. Her performance earned her the Best Actress award at the Golden Eagle Awards. However, the immense success also brought significant pressure. For a period of time, Zhang found herself typecast, which caused her considerable frustration. Her attempts to branch out into other types of roles were met with limited success.

After a period of relative quiet, Zhang Kaili returned to the stage in search of a breakthrough. In 2001, she finally won China's highest drama honor—the Plum Blossom Award—for her performance in the stage play 《Jinianbei》.

At the end of 2011, after winning Best Supporting Actress at the National Drama Festival for 《Luohun Shidai》, Zhang Kaili received the China TV Drama Awards at the "20th Anniversary Celebration of China's Television Industry," jointly presented by the China Television Producers Committee, Directors Committee, and Screenwriters Committee.In January 2018, she was elected as a member of the 13th National Committee of the Chinese People's Political Consultative Conference (CPPCC).

On January 12, 2020, Zhang Kaili was awarded the title of "Preferred Influential Actor of the Year in Integrated Media Communication."

== Film and television works ==
=== TV series/web series ===
Years	Name	Chinese name	Role	Notes
1990		渴望	Liu Huifang	
1994		长天烽火	Ru Yu	
1994		病房浪漫曲		
2002		冬天不冷	Xiu Jing	
2003		老屋	Li Li	
2003	Field of hope	希望的田野	Li Yuhua	
2004		女儿屋的故事	Hua Wenlin	
2005		缘分的天空	Peng Shuyun	
2005	Step brothers	非亲兄弟	Wang Guilan	
2006		好人李成功	Zhang Yunxia	
2006		对手	Ling Yun	
2008		女法官/清官能断家务事	Liu Yue	
2008		善良背后	Liu Guilan	
2009		保姆妈妈	Luo Ying	
2009	o defend the Yan'an	保卫延安	Song Meiling	
2009		中国家庭	Qiu Sha	
2010		闪婚	Xiu Ying	
2010	The sons and daughters of the enemy	儿女冤家	Zhou Huiru	
2011	Naked Wedding	裸婚时代	Tian Shuyun	
2012		哎呀妈妈	Lang Xinyu	
2012		宝贝战争	Zhang Jinfang	
2013	New love time	新恋爱时代	Deng Xiaoke's mother	
2013	Let's get married!	咱们结婚吧	Xue Sumei	
2014	ON OUR WAY HOME	坐88路车回家	Li Meili's mother	
2015	Kung Fu mother-in-law	功夫婆媳	Mei Chaoying	
2016		爱情万万岁	Hua Zhiqiao	
2017	In the Name of People	人民的名义	Wu Huifen	
2017	Huang Danian	黄大年	Xue Mei	
2018	The Way We Were	归去来	Xiao Yun	
2019		天衣无缝	Gui Mu	
2019	UnbEatable you	逆流而上的你	Gao Hongmei	
2020	Perfect Partner	完美关系	Li Yueru	
2021	Medal of the Republic	功勋	Director Lu	
2022	A Lifelong Journey	人世间	Qu Xiuzhen	
2022		新居之约	Xie Shuna	
2023		心想事成	Li Huilan	
2025		成家	Chen Meishu	

=== Film ===
Years	Name	Chinese name	Role	Notes
1987		八女投江	Leng Yun	
1992		人非草木	Du Lan	
1996		军嫂		
2002		美丽的白银那	Ling Hua	
2005	Intel Younger	网络少年	Dean of Studies	
2010	Confucius	孔子	Confucius' wife	

== Awards ==
- 1990 Golden Eagle Award for Best Actress
- 2011 National Drama Awards Best Supporting Actress
- 2013 National Drama Festival Actress with Powerful Acting Skills
- The 13th Huading Awards Best Supporting Actress in China's Top 100 TV Series
