= Qin Lan =

Chinese actor and singer

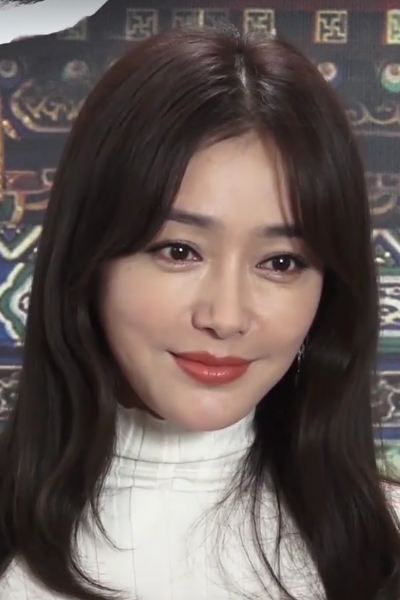
- Qin in 2018
- Born: 17 July 1979 (age 47); Shenyang, Liaoning, China
- Education: Shenyang University of Technology
- Occupations: Actress; singer
- Years active: 1999–present
- Agent: Wow Star Pictures

Chinese name
- Traditional Chinese: 秦嵐
- Simplified Chinese: 秦岚
Transcriptions
Standard Mandarin
- Hanyu Pinyin: Qín Lán

Qin Lan (Chinese: 秦岚; pinyin: Qín Lán; born 17 July 1979) is a Chinese actress, model, and singer. She is known for her roles as Zhihua in My Fair Princess III (2003), Empress Fuca in Story of Yanxi Palace (2018), and Mo Xiangwan in We Are All Alone (2020).

== Career ==
Qin won a Golden Award in the Advertisement Model category of the 1999 National Nominate Newcomer Competition (全国推新人大赛). In February 2003, when Taiwanese writer Chiung Yao and her team were holding auditions in Beijing, Qin was selected from a pool of 200 candidates to play a new character, Chen Zhihua in the television series My Fair Princess III.

In 2013, she was shortlisted for Best Supporting Actress in the 7th Asian Film Awards for the role of Empress Lü Zhi in The Last Supper. In 2015, Qin began working as a producer. In addition to setting up a studio to handle her acting career, she also established a business for developing films. By 2017, Qin had successfully produced two online television series.

Qin experienced a resurgence in popularity for her role as Empress Fucha in the 2018 hit historical drama Story of Yanxi Palace. In 2020, Qin starred in the workplace drama We Are All Alone, playing an iron-willed agent. In 2022, Qin participated in the period drama series Legacy (2022).

== Personal life ==
Qin graduated from the Shenyang University of Technology. She was in a relationship with Huang Xiaoming from 2003 to 2006.

At the end of 2008, Qin met film director Lu Chuan, during the filming of City of Life and Death, and started dating in September 2009. They broke up in July 2013.

In 2022, Qin met and dated Wei Daxun while filming Dr. Tang. They broke up in June 2024.

In March 2021, similar to the actions of most Chinese celebrities, Qin publicly announced her support for cotton from the Xinjiang region after several overseas companies announced they would not purchase cotton from the region due to concerns over the forced labour of Uyghurs.

== Filmography ==
=== Film ===
Year	English title	Chinese title	Role	Notes/Ref.
2004	Deng Xiaoping in 1928	邓小平·1928	Zhang Xiyuan	
2006	Heaven in Ten Days	十日天堂	Qin Nan	
2009	City of Life and Death	南京! 南京!	Mrs Tang	
2009	Looking for Jackie	寻找成龙	Doctor	Cameo
2010	Romance on Lushan Mountain 2010	庐山恋2010	Geng Fei'er	
2011	Mr & Mrs Single	隐婚男女	Cherry	
2011	The Founding of a Party	建党伟业	Su Xuelin	
2012	Be a Mother	母语	Li Yan	
2012	The Last Supper	王的盛宴	Lü Zhi	
2015	Ulterior Motive	别有动机	Ye Shuang	
2016	Who Sleeps My Bro	睡在我上铺的兄弟	Xu Meixin	
2018	Miss Puff	泡芙小姐		Cameo
2018	Super App	超级APP	Rita	also producer
2018	Ex Plan	前任局中局	Chen Wen	
2018	My Neighbor Totoro	龙猫	Mother	China version voice dubbed
2019	Mao Zedong 1949	决胜时刻	Soong Ching-ling	
2019	Sweet Princess	甜心格格	Empress Dowager Cixi	
2021	Raging Fire	怒火	Anna Lam	

=== Television series ===
Year	English title	Chinese title	Role	Notes/Ref.
1999		推新人的故事	Xiaoyu	
2000		信仰	Hong Rong	
2000		不共戴天	Du Juan	
2000		嫁个好男人	Xing Dan	
2001	Love Legend of the Tang Dynasty	大唐情史	Wu Meiniang	
2001		火凤凰	Tong Shanshan	
2003	My Fair Princess III	还珠格格III	Chen Zhihua	
2003		青天衙门	Consort Liang	Cameo
2004	My Date with a Vampire III	我和僵尸有个约会3	Ngok Ngan-ping	
2004		铁血莲花	Shuigu / Shen Shuilian	
2004		龙票	Runyu	
2005	Wind and Cloud 2	风云II	Yu Chuchu	
2005	The Legend of Hero	中华英雄	Mu Xiuluo	
2006	Primacy Teahouse	第一茶庄	Shen Yuqi	
2006		护花奇缘	Guan Qingqing	
2006		芙蓉花开	Lan Xiaowei / Lan Furong	
2006		我家不打烊	Miaomiao	
2006		老鼠爱大米	Xiaowen / Xu Wei	Cameo
2007	Dreams Link	又见一帘幽梦	Wang Lüping	
2007	Embroiderer Lan Xin	绣娘兰馨	Shen Lanxin	
2008	Love in the Forlorn City	伤城之恋	Zhou Yuqing	
2009	Three Black Triangles	黑三角	Cheng Suzhen	
2009	Mysterious House	滴血深宅	Bai Yulan	
2009	Red Electric Wave	红色电波	Xin Qing	
2010	Erroneous True Love	真情错爱	Ye Jin	
2010	Mama I Love You	妈妈我爱你	Yue Juni	Cameo
2011	A Perfect Husband	完美丈夫	Wang Yan	
2011	New My Fair Princess	新还珠格格	Du Xueyin	Cameo
2011	Legend of Fan Liwa	大唐女将樊梨花	Fan Lihua	
2012	King's War	楚汉传奇	Lü Zhi	
2013	Red Dust	滚滚红尘	Gu Haitang	
2013	The Girls 2	女人帮·妞儿	Anni	Cameo
2013	Destiny by Love	非缘勿扰	Liu Lin	
2014	Song of Vengeance	唱战记	Luo Yan	
2014	The Romance of the Condor Heroes	神雕侠侣	Hexiang	Cameo
2016	Who Sleeps My Bro	睡在我上铺的兄弟	Xu Meixin	
2016	Let's Fall in Love	咱们相爱吧	Cai Chun'ni	
2018	Story of Yanxi Palace	延禧攻略	Fuca Rongyin	
2019	The Brightest Star in the Sky	夜空中最闪亮的星	Fang Yiran	Guest appearance
2020	We Are All Alone	怪你过分美丽	Mo Xiangwan	
2020	The Eight	民初奇人传	Jin Xiuniang	
2021	The Rational Life	理智派生活	Shen Ruoxin	
2021	People's Property	人民的财产	Fan Jiahui	Post-production
2022	Legacy	传家	Yi Zhongling	Post-production
2023	Stand or Fall	闪耀的她	Guan Wen	
2024	For the Young Ones	九部的检察官	Du Ziyu	
2025	Watch Your Back	黄雀	Li Xiaolian	
2025		成家	Qin Tianyue	
TBA	Love and Passion	萬水千山總是情	Zhuang Mengdie	Post-production
TBA	Dr. Tang	關於唐醫生的一切	Tang Jiayu	Filming
TBA	The Gate of Renewal	云襄传	Su Huairou	Guest appearance
TBA	The Assassin	隐娘	Ning Jinghai	

== Discography ==
Year	English title	Chinese title	Co-singer(s)	Notes
2006		忘情	Eric Huang	ending theme song of Primacy Teahouse
2007		人在旅途	Bao Jianfeng, Nie Yuan	
2007		滑出精采	Yin Xiaotian, Aduo, Qiusi, Jimmy Wong, Shen Renjie, Jing Gangshan, Cheng Xianjun	theme song of Mingxing Da Lianbing (明星大练冰)
2007	"Wrong"	错		insert song from Dreams Link
2007	"Dreams Link"	又见一帘幽梦		theme song of Dreams Link
2012	"Red Dust"	滚滚红尘		theme song of Red Dust
2013	"One Shoulder Separation"	一肩之隔		theme song of Destiny by Love
2014	"Starlight on the Rooftop"	屋顶上的星光		insert song from Song of Vengeance
2014		硬仗	Xie Binbin	insert song from Song of Vengeance
2014	"Only Want to Love You"	只想爱你		insert song from Song of Vengeance
2014	"Bring Me Away"	带我走		insert song from Song of Vengeance
2018	"Sound of the Falling Snow"	雪落下的声音		insert song from Story of Yanxi Palace
2020	"I Do"	我愿意		promotional song from We Are All Alone

== Awards and nominations ==
Year	Award	Category	Nominated work	Result	Ref.
2008	Golden Eagle Awards	Best Performance by an Actress	Dreams Link	Nominated	
2011	Huading Awards	Best New Actress		Won	
2011	Huading Awards	Best Actress in A Period Drama	Mysterious House	Nominated	
2011	China Image Film Festival	Most Promising Actress	Be a Mother	Won	
2013	Asian Film Awards	Best Supporting Actress	The Last Supper	Nominated	
2018	Golden Seagull International New Media Film Week	Best Actress	Story of Yanxi Palace	Won	
2018	5th The Actors of China Award Ceremony	Best Actress (Web Series)	Story of Yanxi Palace	Won	
2018	Chinese American Film Festival	Actress of the Year	Story of Yanxi Palace	Won	
2018	Iqiyi TV and Movie Awards	Best Screen Performance	Story of Yanxi Palace	Won	
2018	Huading Awards	Best Supporting Actress	Story of Yanxi Palace	Nominated	
2019	China Canada Television Festival	Best Actress	Story of Yanxi Palace	Won	
