= Bi Wenjun =

Chinese singer and actor

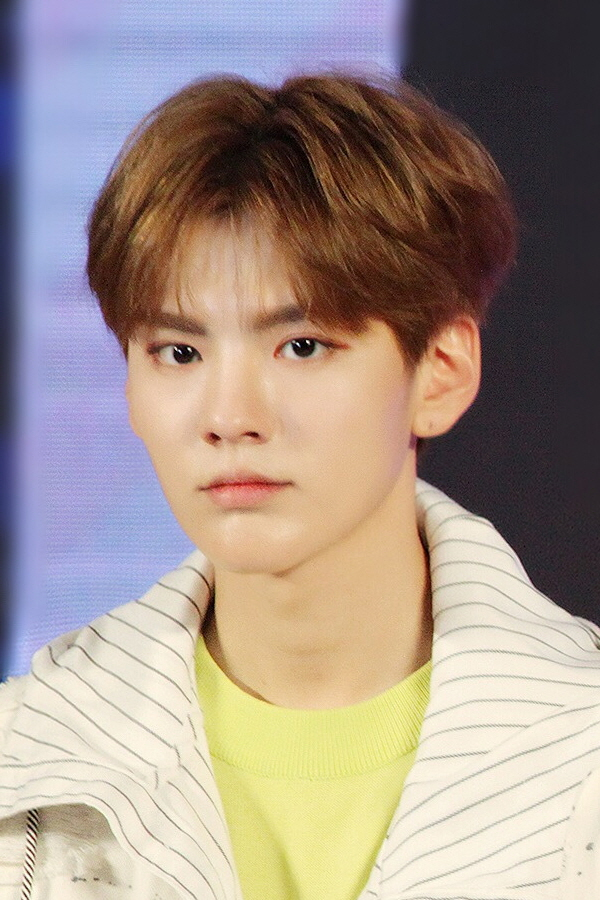
- Bi in 2018
- Born: November 21, 1997 (age 28); Fushun, Liaoning
- Education: Shenyang Conservatory of Music
- Occupations: Singer, actor
- Years active: 2018–present
- Agent: YH Entertainment
- Musical career
- Genre: C-pop
- Label: YH Entertainment

Bi Wenjun
- Simplified Chinese: 毕雯珺
Transcriptions
Standard Mandarin
- Hanyu Pinyin: bì wénjùn

Japanese name
- Katakana: ウェンジュン

Bi Wenjun (Chinese: 毕雯珺, born 21 November 1997) is a Chinese singer and actor. He is a member of the Chinese boy group Next.

== Biography ==
Bi participated in the Chinese boy band survival program Idol Producer aired from January 19 to April 6, 2018. He eventually placed 10th in the final episode.

Bi debuted as a member of YH's new boy band Next with the song "Wait a Minute" on June 21, 2018.

Bi made his acting debut with a leading role in the youth sports drama Sweet Tai Chi, which aired in 2019. He released his first solo single "Fist With My Heart" for the soundtrack of the drama. The same year he became a cast member of the fashion variety show Lipstick Prince. Forbes China listed Bi under their 30 Under 30 China 2019 list which consisted of 30 influential people under 30 years old who have had a substantial effect in their fields.

In 2020, Bi starred in the historical romance drama In a Class of Her Own alongside Ju Jingyi and Song Weilong. He is set to star in the historical romance drama Ni Chang as the male lead; as well as The Silence of the Monster and Sweet Teeth.

In 2021, Bi starred in a psychological and youth drama, Seizing Dreams, historical drama, Jiu Xiao Han Ye Nuan, and e-sport romance drama, Mo Bai.

== Discography ==
=== Singles ===
| Title | Year | Peak chart positions | Sales | Album |
| Title | Year | CHN (Note: The Billboard China Top 100 was launched in January 2019 by Billboard China but hasn't been updated since September 6, 2019. QQ Music has been used to list charted songs after September) | Sales | Album |
|---|---|---|---|---|
| "Go Anime" | 2019 | —N/a | —N/a | Non-album singles |
| "If" | 2019 | —N/a | 590,499+ | Non-album singles |
| "名为你的摄影集" | 2019 | —N/a | 43,794+ | Non-album singles |
| "欲控" | 2020 | —N/a | —N/a | Non-album singles |

=== Soundtrack appearances ===
| Title | Year | Peak chart positions | Notes |
| Title | Year | CHN | Notes |
|---|---|---|---|
| "拳心拳意 (Fist With My Heart)" | 2019 | —N/a | Sweet Taichi OST |
| "I Wanna Be Your Love" | 2022 | —N/a | Double Love OST |
| "截断反应" | 2023 | —N/a | I Am Nobody OST |
| "黑金鱼" | 2025 | —N/a | Deep Affection Eyes OST |

== Filmography ==
=== Television series ===
| Year | English title | Chinese title | Role | Network | Notes | Ref. |
|---|---|---|---|---|---|---|
| 2019 | Sweet Taichi | 淑女飘飘拳 | Wei Chu | Youku | | |
| 2020 | In a Class of Her Own | 漂亮书生 | Yu Lexuan | iQIYI | | |
| 2021 | Ni Chang | 小女霓裳 | Ouyang Ziyu | Youku | | |
| 2021 | Sweet Teeth | 世界微尘里 | Ai Jingchu | iQIYI | | |
| 2022 | Double Love | 墨白 | Han Jing Mo / Mo Bai | | | |
| 2022 | The Silence of the Monster | 孤独的野兽 | He Chufeng | | | |
| 2023 | Warm on a Cold Night | 九霄寒夜暖 | Han Zheng | | | |
| 2023 | I Am Nobody | 异人之下 | Zhang Lingyu | Youku | | |
| 2024 | Link Click (live action) | 时光代理人 | Lu Guang | YouTube/Bilibili | | |
| 2024 | Treasures Around | 珠玉在侧 | Pei Pei | Tencent Video | | |
| 2024 | Kill Me Love Me | 春花焰 | Yue Qin | Youku | | |
| 2025 | The Best Thing | 爱你 | Famous celebrity | iQIYI | Guest role | |
| 2025 | Deep Affection Eyes | 深情眼 | Li Jinyu | Mango TV | | |
| 2025 | Shadow Love | 与晋长安 | Su Muyang | iQIYI | | |
| 2026 | The Warmth in the Dark | 黎明前他会归来 | Pei Chuan | Mango TV | | |
| 2026 | The Scorching Sun | 灼灼烈日 | Yan Lie | Mango TV | | |
| TBA | Dreamcatcher | 夺梦 | Yu Hao | | | |

=== Movie ===
| Year | English title | Chinese title | Role | Notes | Ref. |
|---|---|---|---|---|---|
| 2025 | Be My Friend | 我才不想和你做朋友呢 | Wu Zhixun | | |
| 2026 | Vanished Point | 消失的人 | A Jun | | |
| 2026 | My Tomorrow, Your Yesterday | 想留在你身边 | Jiang Nanshan | | |

=== Television shows ===
| Year | English title | Chinese title | Role | Notes | Ref. |
|---|---|---|---|---|---|
| 2018 | Idol Producer | 偶像练习生 | Contestant | 10th place | |
| 2018 | Happy Camp | 快乐大本营 | Guest | | |
| 2018 | Fantastic Restaurant | 奇妙的食光 | Cast member | | |
| 2019 | Master in the House | 少年可期 | Cast member | | |
| 2019 | Lipstick Prince | 口红王子 | Cast member | | |
| 2019 | When I Grow Up | 一路成年 | Guest | Episode 10 | |
| 2021 | Keep Running | 奔跑吧 | Guest | Season 5, Episode 5 | |
| 2022 | Rising Land | 朝阳打歌中心 | Guest | | |
| 2023 | Infinity and Beyond | 声生不惜 | Guest | Season 2, Episode 8-9 | |
| 2023 | It Sounds Incredible | 听说很好吃 | Guest | Season 3, Episode 12 | |
| 2024 | China Annual Online Audio-Visual Gala | 中国网络视听年度盛典 | Performer | | |
| 2025 | Hunan TV Lantern Festival Gala | 湖南卫视芒果TV元宵喜乐会 | Performer | | |
| 2025 | Weibo Culture Night | 微博文化交流置业 | Performer | | |
| 2025 | Mango TV Youth Night | 青春芒果夜 | Performer | | |
| 2025 | CMG Qixi Festival Gala | 中央广播电视总台七夕晚会 | Performer | | |
| 2025 | Kwai Super Summer Night | 快手超级夏夜 | Performer | | |
| 2025 | The Chinese Beauty Shop | 巴黎合伙人 | Cast member | | |
| 2025 | Hello Saturday | 你好，星期六 | Guest | | |
| 2025 | Wuling Mountain AI Café | 武陵山AI咖啡馆 | Guest | | |
| 2025 | China Cinema 120th Anniversary Gala | 中国电影120周年活力之夜 | Performer | | |
| 2026 | National Treasure: Travel Season | 国家宝藏 | Guest | | |
| 2026 | CMG Spring Festival Gala | 中央广播电视总台春节联欢晚会 | Performer | | |

== Awards and nominations ==
| Year | Award | Category | Nominated work | Results | Ref. |
|---|---|---|---|---|---|
| 2019 | Sina Fashion Awards | Breakthrough Artist of the Year | —N/a | Won | |
| 2021 | Lifestyle Style Gala | Most Potential Actor | —N/a | Won | |
| 2021 | National Geographic Traveler Star Gala Charity | Model of the Year | —N/a | Won | |
| 2021 | Ifeng Fashion Choice | Most Charming Actor of the Year | —N/a | Won | |
| 2022 | China International Youth Film Festival Golden Blossom Awards | Breakthrough Actor of the Year | —N/a | Won | |
| 2023 | Wenrong Awards Ceremony | Ten Best Young Actors | —N/a | Won | |
| 2023 | iQiyi Scream Night Awards | Most Promising Actor of the Year | —N/a | Won | |
| 2025 | Lushan International Romance Film Week | Romantic Film Supporting Actor of the Year | Be My Friend | Nominated | |
| 2025 | Man About Town Awards | Style Actor of the Year | —N/a | Won | |
| 2026 | Soda Music Annual Gala | Breakthrough Artist of the Year | —N/a | Won | |
