= Love Will Tear Us Apart (disambiguation) =

"Love Will Tear Us Apart" is a song by the British band Joy Division.

Love Will Tear Us Apart can also refer to:

- Love Will Tear Us Apart (1999 film), a Hong Kong indie film
- Love Will Tear Us Apart (2013 film), a Chinese film
- Love Will Tear Us Apart (2021 film), a Chinese film
