= Song Weilong =

Song Weilong may refer to:

- Song Weilong (speed skater) (born 1989), Chinese speed skater
- Song Weilong (actor) (born 1999), Chinese actor and model
