= Run for Young =

Chinese television series

- Also known as: 风犬少年的天空
- Genre: Youth
- Screenplay by: Li Zelin
- Directed by: Zhang Yibai; Han Yan; Li Bingqiang
- Starring: Peng Yuchang; Zhang Jingyi; Liang Jingkang; Zhou Yiran; Zhang Youhao; Guo Cheng; Zhou You
- Opening theme: Village Fools by The Evening Guests
- Country of origin: China
- Original languages: Mandarin; Chongqing Dialect
- No. of episodes: 16

Production
- Running time: 60 minutes
- Production companies: Huanxi Media Group, Ltd. Shanghai Shigu Film Co., Ltd.

Original release
- Network: Bilibili; Huanxi Premium
- Release: 24 September – 22 October 2020

Run For Young (Chinese: 风犬少年的天空) is a 2020 youth Chinese television series directed by Zhang Yibai, Han Yan and Li Bingqiang , adapted from the novel Feng Quan Shao Nian De Tian Kong (Chinese: 疯犬少年的天空) by Li Zelin who also wrote the screenplay. Starring Peng Yuchang, Zhang Jingyi, Liang Jingkang, Zhou Yiran, Zhang Youhao, Guo Cheng and Zhou You. The series premiered on Bilibili and Huanxi Premium from September 24, 2020.

== Plot ==
The story is set in the early 2000s in Chongqing and follows Four Brothers of Daxing Village: Lao Gou, Dali Jiao, Mimi, and Da Zui. At school, they meet two students, Anran and Ma Tian, as well as Liu Wenqin, who joined the society at a young age. Initially, they are at odds with one another, but they eventually become friends and face life's choices together.

== Cast ==
- Peng Yuchang as Tu Jun ("Lao Gou")
- Zhang Jingyi as Li Anran
- Liang Jingkang as Ma Tian
- Zhou Yiran as Zhu Weijiao ("Dali Jiao")
- Zhang Youhao as Ding Rongliang ("Mimi")
- Guo Cheng as Luo Shenxi ("Da Zui")
- Zhou You as Liu Wenqin
- Huang Jue as Lao Gou's father
- Liu Yiwei as Dali Jiao's father
- Liang Jing as Da Zui's mother
- Guo Jinglin as Li Anran's father
- Tu Ling as Ma Tian's mother
- Yang Dawei as Mimi's father
- Zhang Jiayu as Mimi's mother
- Li Ou as Liu Wenqin's father

== Production ==
The series is produced by Bilibili, Huanxi Media Group, Ltd., and Shanghai Shigu Film Co., Ltd On January 29, 2019, Run For Young released a winter poster and announced that the winter scenes were completed. Filming took place in Chongqing during the summer and winter seasons.

== Awards and nominations ==
Year	Awards	Category	Nominee(s) / work(s)	Result	Ref.
2021	State Administration of Radio and Television	Outstanding Online Audiovisual Works of 2020	Run For Young	Won	
