= Love for You =

- Promotional poster
- Also known as: Wild Dog Bones; Yegou Gutou
- Simplified Chinese: 野狗骨头
- Hanyu Pinyin: Yěgǒu Gǔtou
- Genre: Romance; Youth; Family
- Based on: Yegou Gutou by Xiu Tu Cheng
- Written by: Xiao Xiao
- Directed by: Liu Junjie
- Starring: Zhang Jingyi; Song Weilong
- Country of origin: China
- Original language: Mandarin
- No. of episodes: 32

Production
- Producer: Li Xingjian
- Production location: Huizhou, China
- Running time: 45 minutes
- Production companies: Mango TV; Liehuo Pictures

Original release
- Network: Mango TV; Hunan TV
- Release: 5 July – 21 July 2026

Love for You (Chinese: 野狗骨头; pinyin: Yěgǒu Gǔtou) is a 2026 Chinese television series starring Zhang Jingyi and Song Weilong. It is adapted from the web novel Ye Gou Gu Tou by Xiu Tu Cheng, directed by Liu Junjie and written by Xiao Xiao . The story is about the lives of two youths who meet through their parents' relationship but go separate ways due to a devastating fire incident. Years later, work reunites them in their hometown, where they face the wounds and dangers of the past together, and unresolved feelings reignite. They must decide whether love can survive the years between them. On 5 July 2026, it was released on Mango TV and Rakuten Viki.

== Synopsis ==
In the 1990s, the lives of Chen Yi (Song Weilong) and Miao Jing (Zhang Jingyi) become intertwined after their parents meet. Initially hostile, both started to depend on each other for survival after Chen's father dies and Miao's mother disappears.

During their university years, Miao Jing confesses her feelings for Chen Yi. However, Chen Yi becomes a key witness in a high-profile arson case. To ensure Miao Jing's safety from the criminals involved, he forces her to leave their hometown of Tengcheng while he cooperates with the police.

Years later, Miao Jing returns to Tengcheng as an auditor for Good Luck Logistics, where she reunites with Chen Yi, who now operates a local billiards hall. Wary of the logistics company's boss, Zhang Bin, due to ties to the past arson incident, Chen Yi attempts to dissuade Miao Jing from her work. As Zhang Bin's involvement in a smuggling syndicate is exposed, Chen Yi enters the conflict to protect Miao Jing. Working alongside the police, the pair eventually bring the criminal organization to justice. In the aftermath, a seriously injured Chen Yi confesses his love to Miao Jing, and the two reconcile as a couple.

== Cast ==
=== Main ===
- Song Weilong as Chen Yi: A young man with a tough exterior but a protective heart.
- Zhang Jingyi as Miao Jing: A resilient young woman navigating family and personal struggles.

=== Supporting ===
- He Ruixian as Tu Li
- Liang Jingkang as Cen Ye

== Production ==
The series was first officially unveiled during the Mango TV 2024–2025 annual conference as a major 'Youth Healing' project.

On May 15, 2025, the production team released the first official posters during the booting ceremony, and principal photography officially began in Huizhou, Guangdong Province. The production team utilized the coastal city's unique mix of 1990s-style residential alleys and modern logistics hubs to represent the fictional city of "Tengcheng". On 10 September 2025, the filming was officially wrapped in Huizhou.

== Reception ==
The series topped the Weibo Drama Popularity Index, and surpassed 50 million views within two days; the pilot episode surpassed 20 million views within the first two hours. During its broadcast, it remained in Parade's 'Top 3 Contemporary Chinese Dramas' list.

== Original Soundtrack ==
Love for You OST (野狗骨头 电视剧原声带)
No.	Title	Lyrics	Music	Singer	Length
1.	"Dreams I Don't Want to Wake From [不愿醒的梦]" (Wild Dog Theme / Ending)	Xu Mingming	Xu Mingming	Tanya Chua	4:08
2.	"I Want You to Love Me [我要你爱我]" (Bone Theme / Ending)	Du Kunyang	Shi Youli	Zhang Bichen	4:12
3.	"Roaming [漫游]" (Bond Song)	Ding Jiayu	Ding Jiayu	Lars Huang	4:00
4.	"Towards the Wilderness [向野]" (Running Song)	Du Kunyang	Shi Youli, Li Miaomiao	隔壁老樊	3:53
5.	"Wild Heart [野生心脏]" (Growth Song)	Hu Yu	Hu Yu	YAOCHEN	3:15
6.	"Want to Ask You If You're Willing [想问你愿意吗]" (Emotional Song)	Hua Xiyue	Hua Xiyue	Song Weilong, Zhang Jingyi	4:02
7.	"Bone Flame [骨焰]" (Fate Song)	Shi Youli, Hu Guanyu	Shi Youli, Hu Guanyu	Song Weilong	3:56
8.	"Waves [波澜]" (Healing Song)	Wu Zhijing	Zheng Bingbing	Zhang Jingyi	4:24

== Ratings ==
- The Orange number represents the lowest ratings and the Blue number represents the highest ratings in China.
- Based on the average audience share per day (Yunhe Data).

Original Broadcast Date	Average Audience Share	National Ranking China
July 5, 2026	6.8%	2
July 6, 2026	9.6%	3
July 12, 2026	11.7%	3
July 13, 2026	13.0%	2
July 14, 2026	13.5%	2
July 15, 2026	14.4%	3
July 16, 2026	14.8%	3
July 17, 2026	14.4%	3
July 18, 2026	14.3%	3
July 19, 2026	11.3%	4
July 20, 2026	11.0%	4
July 21, 2026	11.5%	4
Average	12.19%	
