= Zhang Jingyi =

Chinese actress (born 1999)

- Born: 10 July 1999 (age 27); Shaoyang, Hunan
- Education: Beijing Film Academy
- Occupation: Actress
- Years active: 2018–present
- Agent: K.Artists

Chinese name
- Simplified Chinese: 张婧仪
- Traditional Chinese: 張婧儀
Transcriptions
Standard Mandarin
- Hanyu Pinyin: Zhāng Jìngyí

Zhang Jingyi (Chinese: 张婧仪, born 10 July 1999) is a Chinese actress. She graduated from Beijing Film Academy class of 2017. In 2018, she signed onto K.Artists, an agent co-established by Chen Kun and Zhou Xun. She is best known for playing Ling Yiyao in her debut moive, Love Will Tear Us Apart (2021) and her roles in the drama Fall in Love (2021) as Mu Wanqing, Lighter and Princess (2022) as Zhu Yun which brought her global fame, Blossoms in Adversity (2024) as Hua Zhi and Love for You (2026) as Miao Jing.

== Filmography ==
=== Film ===
Year	English title	Chinese title	Role	Ref.
2021	Love Will Tear Us Apart	我要我们在一起	Ling Yiyao	
2021	1921	1921	Soong Mei-ling	
2021	All About My Mother	关于我妈的一切	Li Xiaomei	
2022	The Great Director	地球最后的导演		
2023	Hidden Blade	无名	Ms. Fang	
2023	Godspeed	人生路不熟	Zhou Weiyu	
2023	Tale of The Night	长沙夜生活	He Xixi	
2024	I Miss You	被我弄丢的你	Wang Jinjin	
2025	The One	独一无二	Yu Yan	

=== Television series ===
Year	English title	Chinese title	Role	Ref.
2020	Run for Young	风犬少年的天空	Li Anran	
2021	Faith Makes Great	理想照耀中国	Zhang Huamei	
2021	Fall in Love	一见倾心	Mu Wanqing	
2022	Great Miss D	了不起的D小姐	Ding Yiqing	
2022	Lighter and Princess	点燃我，温暖你	Zhu Yun	
2023	Bright Eyes in the Dark	他从火光中走来	Nan Chu	
2024	Blossoms in Adversity	惜花芷	Hua Zhi	
2025	The Legend of Zang Hai	藏海传	Xiang Antu	
2025	Reborn	焕羽	Qiao Qingyu	
2026	Love for You	野狗骨头	Miao Jing	
TBA	Chasing Dreams	梦花廷	Ti Lan / Zi Zan	
TBA	On My Way	致我那菜市场的白月光	Ren Dongxue	
TBA	A Touch of Green	雾里青	Chen Qingwu	
TBA	Winds Beyond the Wall	九重天	TBA	

=== Television shows ===
Year	English title	Chinese title	Role	Notes
2020	Back to Field Season 4	向往的生活4	Guest	Ep. 1–3
2021	Action!	开拍吧!	Regular Member	Ep. 1
2023	Hello, Saturday 2023	你好，星期六 2023	Guest	Ep. 25
2023	Keep Running (season 11)	奔跑吧11	Guest	Ep. 132
2024	Mao Xue Woof	毛雪汪	Guest	Ep. 75
2025	I Smile When I See You	一见你就笑	Guest	Ep. 11
2026	Hello, Saturday 2026	你好，星期六 2026	Guest	Ep. 18
2026	Our Dormitories Season 2: Back to Heart	我们的宿舍 第二季·归心季	Guest	Ep. 2

== Awards and nominations ==
Year	Award	Category	Nominated work(s)	Result	Ref.
2021	2021 Weibo Movie Night	Promising Actress of the Year	—N/a	Won	
2022	2022 Weibo Movie Night	Promising Actress of the Year	—N/a	Won	
2023	1st "New Horns" Drama Director's Night	Breakthrough Actress of the Year	—N/a	Won	
2023	2022 Weibo Awards	Breakthrough Actress of the Year	Lighter and Princess	Won	
2023	2022-2023 M-Chart of China Movie Channel, the Ceremony of Chinese Movie Data	Notable Actress of the Year	Hidden Blade, Godspeed, and Tale of The Night	Won	
2023	15th Golden Lotus Awards (Macau International Movie & Television Festival)	Best Newcomer	Hidden Blade	Nominated	
2023	4th New Era International Film Festival Golden Flowering Awards Ceremony	Most Challenging Actress of the New Era	Tale of The Night	Nominated	
2023	4th New Era International Film Festival Golden Flowering Awards Ceremony	Most Breakthrough Actress of the New Era	Godspeed	Nominated	
2023	2023 Tencent Video All Star Awards	Promising Movie Actress of the Year	Hidden Blade, Godspeed, and Tale of The Night	Won	
2024	2023 Weibo Awards	Breakthrough Actress of the Year	Bright Eyes in the Dark	Won	
2024	2024 Asia Contents Awards & Global OTT Awards	Best Newcomer Actress	Blossoms in Adversity	Nominated	
2024	3rd Hong Kong Bauhinia International Film Festival	Best Leading Actress	Tale of The Night	Nominated	
2025	2024 Weibo Awards	Expressive Actress of the Year	I Miss You, Blossoms in Adversity	Won	
2025	2025 Zhejiang Film Phoenix	Best Actress	I Miss You	Won	
2025	6th Lushan International Romance Film Week	Best Actress	I Miss You	Nominated	
2025	16th Golden Lotus Awards (Macau International Movie & Television Festival)	Best Actress	The Legend of Zang Hai	Nominated	
2025	17th Golden Lotus Awards (Macau International Movie & Television Festival)	Best Actress	The One	Nominated	
2026	4th CMG China TV Drama Annual Ceremony	Breakthrough Actress of the Year	The Legend of Zang Hai	Nominated	

== Ambassadorships and endorsements ==
Year	Role	Brand	Ref.
2021 to 2022	Brand Ambassador	Elizabeth Arden	
2021 to 2022	Brand Spokesperson	CISSONNE	
2021 to 2022	Brand Spokesperson	V-GIRL (Youth)	
2023	Brand Friend	Casarte	
2023	Brand Ambassador	Lancome (Skincare and Makeup Line)	
2023	Brand Ambassador	FRESH	
2023	Brand Ambassador	Wang Lao Ji	
2023	Brand Ambassador	Chun Zhen Just Pure Yogurt	
2023	Brand Ambassador	Zhunpin Youth Charity	
2023	Brand Spokesperson	Victoria Secret (Youth)	
2023	Brand Spokesperson	Freeplus (Cleansing Line)	
2023 to 2024	Brand Ambassador	Celine	
2024	Brand Trendsetter	Xiaomi (Civi Line)	
2024	Brand Ambassador	Yadi (New Year Renewal)	
2023 to 2025	Brand Spokesperson	Peacebird (Women's Clothing Line)	
2025	Brand Spokesperson	TuTuCare	
2025	Find X9 Series Travel Image Creator	Oppo	
2024 to Present	Brand Ambassador	Cartier	
2024 to Present	Brand Ambassador	Burberry	
2025 to Present	Brand Spokesperson	Columbia	
2025 to Present	Brand Spokesperson	Peacebird	
2024 to 2026	House Ambassador	Tods	
2024 to 2026	Brand Ambassador	Lancome	
2025 to 2026	Brand Ambassador	René Furterer	
2026 (Present)	Brand Ambassador	Songmont	
2026 (Present)	Global Brand Ambassador	Shokz	
2026 (Present)	Brand Spokesperson	Langsha	
2026 (Present)	Brand Spokesperson	René Furterer	
2026 (Present)	Brand Spokesperson	C.banner	
2026 (Present)	Brand Spokesperson	Lancome	
2026 (Present)	Brand Spokesperson	BYD Qin Max	
