= Lighter and Princess =

2022 Chinese television series

- Promotional poster
- Also known as: 打火机与公主裙
- 点燃我，温暖你
- Genre: Youth, Romance, Drama
- Based on: Lighter and Princess: Wild Grass Garden and Lighter and Princess: Everlasting Light by Twentine
- Written by: Zhou Yong
- Directed by: Liu Junjie (director)、Ma Weiwei
- Starring: Chen Feiyu, Zhang Jingyi
- Opening theme: "King and Knight"
- Ending theme: "Fireworks"
- Composer: Chen Xueran
- Country of origin: China
- Original language: Mandarin Chinese
- No. of episodes: 36

Production
- Executive producers: Wu Jinglin, Hu Xiao
- Producers: Dun Qi, Luo Yuanyuan
- Cinematography: Fang Zhenhu
- Editor: Guo Qingqing
- Running time: 45 minutes
- Production companies: Alibaba Pictures, Youku, Juyou Xiangfa

Original release
- Network: Youku
- Release: 3 November – 9 December 2022

Lighter and Princess (originally titled Lighter and the Princess Dress) is a 2022 Chinese coming-of-age romance television drama directed by Liu Junjie and written by Zhou Yong. It stars Chen Feiyu and Zhang Jingyi. The series is adapted from the novel Lighter and the Princess Dress by the Jinjiang Literature City author Twentine.

The drama began filming on 29 September 2021, and wrapped up production in February 2022. It premiered on Youku's Cherish Theatre on November 3, 2022. In Taiwan, it was simultaneously released on LINE TV every Monday to Wednesday at 22:00 starting from November 3, 2022.

== Plot ==
The drama tells the coming-of-age and romance story of Li Xun, a proud and talented programming genius, and Zhu Yun, a brave and resilient female academic achiever. From their youthful school days to struggles in the workplace, they face many challenges but continue to walk forward hand in hand.

== Cast ==
=== Main cast ===
Actor	Role	Description
Chen Feiyu	Li Xun	A computer genius and top scorer in science in the national college entrance exam. Proud and sharp-tongued, he is more mature than his peers due to his unique experiences, though he is deeply emotional and irrational when it comes to love. He meets and falls in love with Zhu Yun by chance and they later run the LP company together.
Zhang Jingyi	Zhu Yun	Seen by others as a well-behaved girl with ideals and ambitions. She refuses to follow the path planned by her mother and falls deeply in love with Li Xun. After several unexpected events, she goes abroad but never truly lets go of Li Xun. She returns to Shanghai and reunites with him to reclaim their company, standing firmly by his side despite his prickly nature. They jointly operate the LP company.
Zhao Zhiwei	Gao Jianhong	A university classmate of Zhu Yun and Li Xun, cunning and jealous of Li Xun’s talent. The three formed a close trio during college, but Gao secretly envied Li Xun and resented him especially since the girl he liked also liked Li Xun. Later, he stole Li Xun’s achievements and took over the LP company founded by Li Xun and Zhu Yun, viewing Li Xun as an enemy.
Zeng Keni	Ren Di	Zhu Yun’s close friend and university classmate, roommate with Zhu Yun and Fang Shumiao. She was once in a band funded by Li Xun and is considered Li Xun’s confidante. She eventually becomes a professional musician and understands Li Xun and Zhu Yun’s past.
Cui Yuxin	Fang Zhijing	A student at Xinke University and Zhu Yun’s senior in high school. Cunning and deceitful, he hates Li Xun due to being humiliated by him in a competition. He later schemes against Li Xun, leading to Li Xun’s sister’s car accident. Li Xun retaliates by blinding Fang in the left eye, which results in Li Xun’s imprisonment. After entering society, he becomes Gao Jianhong’s partner and accomplice but is more rational compared to Gao’s nearly insane hatred toward Li Xun.
Qian Didi	Xu Lina	A student at Xinke University who chose computer science to resist her family’s wishes. Originally liked Li Xun and later became Gao Jianhong’s wife.

=== Supporting cast ===
Actor	Role	Description
Jiang Zixin	Fang Shumiao	University classmate and roommate of Zhu Yun, also her friend. Once liked Li Xun. Majored in computer science but was not skilled. Later became a lawyer.
Ma Ke	Tian Xiuzhu	Zhu Yun’s friend who once liked her. A well-known painter who returned to the country with Zhu Yun three years later.
Hu Wenxuan	Fu Yizhuo	Li Xun’s childhood playmate who loves Latin dance. Both were expelled from school after asking Li Xun to alter exam scores.
Zhang Xilin	Dong Siyang	Owner of "My Heart Soars," impatient and interested in driving a taxi.
Tu Songyan	Zhu Guangyi	Zhu Yun’s father. Initially admired Li Xun but later opposed Zhu Yun’s relationship with him due to misunderstandings.
Zhao Ziqi	Liu Ailin	Zhu Yun’s mother, strict and once punished Li Xun, causing him to drop out of high school. Always opposed Zhu Yun’s relationship with Li Xun.
Xu Jie'er	Li Lan	Li Xun’s older sister who died in a car accident.
Gao Xuanming	Hou Ning	Shared a prison cell with Li Xun. Skilled hacker and cook, helped Li Xun with daily needs.

== Soundtrack ==
The following songs are from the original soundtrack of Lighter and Princess.

No.	Title	Note	Lyricist	Composer	Arranger	Performer
1	"焰火" (Fireworks)	Theme song	Zhang Ying	Shi Yang	Luo Kun	Zhou Shen
2	"国王与骑士" (King and Knight)	Opening theme	Ming Tian	Chen Xueran	Chen Xueran	Chen Xueran
3	"Falling You"	Insert song	Zhou Ren	Du Zhiwen	Du Zhiwen	Zeng Keni, Du Zhiwen
4	"谎" (Lie)	Insert song	Zhang Ying	Luo Kun	EMO D, Yu Yunfei	Yuan Yawei
5	"恋爱循环" (Love Circulation)	Insert song	Ming Tian	Chen Xueran	Chen Xueran	Miko Sunhan (BY2)
6	"妳說妳還不了" (You Say You Can't)	Insert song	Fang Wenshan	Liang Sihua	Liang Sihua	Cao Yang
7	"轻红" (Light Red)	Insert song	Ming Tian	Chen Xueran	Chen Xueran	Chen Xueran
