= Find Yourself =

Chinese television station

- Chinese: 下一站是幸福
- Hanyu Pinyin: Xiàyízhàn Shì Xìngfú
- Genre: Romantic comedy
- Written by: Shui Qianmo; Wang Xiongcheng
- Directed by: Ding Xinguang
- Starring: Victoria Song; Song Weilong; Wang Yaoqing
- Country of origin: China
- Original language: Mandarin
- No. of episodes: 41

Production
- Producer: Long Ya
- Production company: Huace Media

Original release
- Network: Hunan TV
- Release: January 26, 2020

Find Yourself (Chinese: 下一站是幸福; pinyin: Xiàyízhàn Shì Xìngfú; lit. 'Next Stop Is Happiness') is a 2020 Chinese television series starring Victoria Song, Song Weilong and Wang Yaoqing. The series airs on Hunan TV and Netflix starting January 26, 2020.

== Synopsis ==
He Fanxing (Victoria Song) - a director of administration at a design company - is relentlessly pursued by the company intern Yuan Song (Song Weilong). Despite him being much younger, she eventually agrees to enter into a relationship on the condition of a three-month secrecy because she is highly concerned about how her parents and others may view their large age gap. Facing problems in their relationship, mature and dependable Ye Luming (Wang Yaoqing) - CEO of an advertising agency - appears in her life under the guise of a relationship mentor. Yet, Ye Luming has a secret agenda - to win He Fanxing over from Yuan Song.

The appearance of Ye Luming causes Yuan Song to feel insecure about his relationship with He Fanxing, which spurs the creation of misunderstandings between them. For He Fanxing, the choice between Yuan Song and Ye Luming is not merely about love, but also the expectation that she should uphold traditional relationship and marriage rules. As the misunderstanding between He Fanxing and Yuan Song worsens, Yuan Song attempts to reveal their relationship to the public at a masquerade ball, yet He Fanxing finds herself unable to accept this, and decides to break up with Yuan Song. To worsen her situation, her company faces the threat of acquisition by a rival design company Aijia, plunging her into a "mid-life" crisis.

Unbeknownst to all, He Canyang (Zhang Yujian) - He Fanxing's younger brother - enters into a relationship with Cai Minmin (Yu Shuxin) - Ye Luming's niece and Yuan Song's schoolmate - which dramatically complicates the already complex situation between the characters. He Fanxing tries to start a relationship with Ye Luming, which becomes immediately viewed by others as a highly compatible couple. He Fanxing's father is diagnosed with early-stage dementia, which makes her increasingly impatient to get married and have children for the sake of her parents. She decides to make a more conscious attempt to fall in love with Ye Luming. He Fanxing and Ye Luming attends the birthday party of Steven's - chairman of Aijia - daughter. Yet, they unexpectedly run into Yuan Song, who is revealed as Steven's son.

Eventually, He Fanxing finds that no matter how hard she tries to fall in love with Ye Luming, she is just unable to do so. Realising that his pursuit has become a lost cause, Ye Luming decides to end their relationship, and return to being friends. After breaking up, He Fanxing has become much clearer of what she wants in a relationship. Finding out that Yuan Song has gone to Suzhou with another girl to attend an architectural conference, He Fanxing abruptly rushes to follow him there, eventually reconciling and making their relationship public straight away. Yuan Song decides to study overseas, yet their relationship is not affected in any way because of the long distance. He Fanxing has also resigned from her job, instead opening a store and becoming a florist, finally achieving a sense of fulfilment in both her career and relationship.

== Cast ==
=== Main ===
Actor	Character	Introduction
Victoria Song	He Fanxing	A career woman who is inexperienced in love.
Song Weilong	Yuan Song	A university student in love with He Fanxing.
Wang Yaoqing	Ye Luming	CEO of a company. He is romantically interested in He Fanxing.
Zhang Yujian	He Canyang	He Fanxing's younger brother. Yuan Song's advisor and close friend.
Yu Shuxin	Cai Minmin	He Canyang's love interest, Yuan Song’s University’s Junior and Lu Ming’s niece.

=== Supporting ===
Actor	Character	Introduction
Fu Jia	He Qingfeng	Fanxing and Canyang's father.
Mary Ma	Shen Hongmei	Fanxing and Canyang's mother.
Yang Zhiying	Cong Xiao	Salesperson at Amazing Decoration.
Wei Zheming	Chang Huan	Designer at Amazing Decoration.
Cai Yatong	Yang Xiaoyu	Fanxing’s best friend
Zeng Li	Wu Meiyin	AIJIA’s director
Zhou Qiqi	Song Xue	Professor in University and Fanxing’s best friend.
Li Xian	Jin Tian	
Zhang Lei	Li Mingliang	
Wang Yuhao	Ding Da	

== Production ==
Filming took place in Shanghai and Suzhou. The series began filming in September 2018, and wrapped up in November 2018.

== Ratings ==
- Highest ratings are marked in red, lowest ratings are marked in blue

Air date	Hunan TV CSM59 City ratings			CSM National Network		
Air date	Ratings (%)	Audience share (%)	Rank	Ratings (%)	Audience share (%)	Rank
2020.1.26	1.657	4.98	3	1.02	3.3	1
2020.1.27	1.648	4.7	4	1.22	3.9	1
2020.1.28	1.78	4.95	3	1.3	4.01	1
2020.1.29	1.841	5.15	3	1.3	4.07	1
2020.1.30	1.834	5.11	3	1.53	4.78	1
2020.1.31	2.031	5.58	2	1.48	4.51	1
2020.2.1	2.432	6.78	1	1.56	4.81	1
2020.2.2	1.868	5.07	3	1.51	4.54	1
2020.2.3	2.162	5.89	1	1.7	5.08	1
2020.2.4	2.108	5.69	2	1.71	5.12	1
2020.2.5	2.461	6.63	1	1.87	5.62	1
2020.2.6	2.441	6.56	1	1.87	5.47	1
2020.2.7	1.977	4.87	3	1.6	4.28	1
2020.2.9	2.144	5.75	3	1.66	5.05	1
2020.2.10	2.413	6.94	1	1.85	6.06	1
2020.2.11	2.288	6.48	3	1.82	5.79	1
2020.2.12	2.533	7.26	1	1.98	6.46	1
2020.2.13	2.238	6.44	4	1.85	6.15	1
2020.2.14	2.191	5.6	3	1.78	5.06	1
2020.2.15	2.073	5.2	3	1.6	4.48	1
2020.2.16	2.415	6.56	2	1.84	5.6	1
2020.2.17	2.968	8.77	1	2.05	6.86	1
2020.2.18	2.363	6.19	3	1.91	5.5	1

== Award and nominations ==
Award	Category	Nominee	Result	ref.
30th China TV Golden Eagle Award	Outstanding Television Series	Find Yourself	Nominated	
30th China TV Golden Eagle Award	Audience's Choice for Actress	Victoria Song	Nominated	
30th China TV Golden Eagle Award	Audience's Choice for Actress	Yu Shuxin	Nominated	

== Adaptations ==
In 2023, the series was adapted into a 16-episode Thai lakorn of the same name. It premiered on GMM25 on December 18, 2023, airing weekly on Mondays and Tuesdays at 20:30 (ICT). It stars Taksaorn Paksukcharern, Chanon Santinatornkul, Saharat Sangkapreecha, Pirapat Watthanasetsiri, and Panitsara Yang.
