= In a Class of Her Own =

2020 Chinese television series

- Traditional Chinese: 漂亮書生
- Simplified Chinese: 漂亮书生
- Hanyu Pinyin: Piàoliang Shūshēng
- Genre: Historical; Romance
- Based on: Sungkyunkwan Scandal by Kim Tae-hee The Lives of Sungkyunkwan Confucian Scholars by Jung Eun-gwol
- Starring: Ju Jingyi; Song Weilong; Bi Wenjun; Wang Ruichang
- Country of origin: China
- Original language: Mandarin
- No. of episodes: 36

Production
- Production location: Hengdian World Studios

Original release
- Network: iQiyi
- Release: 23 July – 15 August 2020

In a Class of Her Own (Chinese: 漂亮书生; pinyin: Piàoliang Shūshēng) is a 2020 Chinese television series starring Ju Jingyi, Song Weilong, Bi Wenjun and Wang Ruichang. The series premiered on iQiyi with multi-languages subtitles globally on July 23, 2020.

== Synopsis ==
Xue Wenxi comes from a poor family, and disguises as a guy to make ends meet by helping to transcribe and copywrite books. She meets Feng Chengjun, the son of the Prime Minister, during a business transaction. Coming to admire her talent, Feng Chengjun secretly sets a plan in motion that leaves her with no choice but to enroll in the Yun Shang Academy. As the school only accepts male students, Xue Wenxi disguises herself as a boy (using her brother's name Wenbin), and lives everyday on thin ice to guard her secret. Fortunately, she has Feng Chengjun to come to her aid, allowing her to focus on her studies. Using her wit, kindness and charm, she also become close friends with the rebellious and unrestrained Yu Lexuan and the cold and aloof Lei Zexin. The four become known as the "Yun Shang Quartet". As they overcome many hurdles together, the four influence one another and grow together along the way. Xue Wenxi eventually exposed her identity as a girl, and find mutual love with Feng Chengjun. As they inherit the legacy of their ancestors and strive to uphold their ideals, they also fall into a crisis as they become entangled with the conflicts passed down from the older generation.

== Main cast ==
- Ju Jingyi as Xue Wenxi
- Song Weilong as Feng Chengjun
- Bi Wenjun as Yu Lexuan
- Wang Ruichang as Lei Zexin
- Other Cast
- Chen Yilong as Han Zhisheng
- Zhu Shengyi
- Zhang Xin
- Wang Jinsong
- Yu Bo
- Gong Beibi
- Wang Ce
