= Love Will Tear Us Apart (2021 film) =

2021 film directed by Mo Sha

- Theatrical release poster
- Simplified Chinese: 我要我们在一起
- Hanyu Pinyin: Wǒ yào wǒmen zài yīqǐ
- Directed by: Mo Sha
- Screenplay by: Wang Zhiyong; Fu Dandi
- Produced by: Chen Kuo-fu
- Starring: Qu Chuxiao; Zhang Jingyi
- Production companies: CKF Pictures; Alibaba Pictures; Tencent Pictures
- Distributed by: Tao Piao Piao
- Release date: May 20, 2021
- Running time: 105 minutes
- Country: China
- Language: Mandarin
- Box office: US$45.1 million

Love Will Tear Us Apart (Chinese: 我要我们在一起) is a 2021 Chinese romantic drama film directed by Mo Sha and produced by Chen Kuo-fu. Inspired by a long-form Douban post titled "My Girlfriend of Ten Years Is Getting Married Tomorrow", it tells the story of a ten-year love affair between Lü Qinyang (Qu Chuxiao) and Ling Yiyao (Zhang Jingyi). It was released in China on May 20, 2021.

== Plot ==
Lu Qinyang and Ling Yiyao fall in love during their school years, beginning with a confession letter. After graduating from high school, Lu Qinyang goes to Zhoushan to work, while Ling Yiyao continues her studies in Nanjing. Their relationship is opposed by Ling Yiyao's mother, but the two remain determined to stay together.

However, as Lu Qinyang's career develops, he faces exclusion and pressure from his superiors and colleagues. At the same time, Ling Yiyao's mother falls ill and is hospitalized, increasingly favoring a rival suitor, Luo Tingyu. Burdened by debt and wanting to provide a better life, Lu Qinyang decides to leave Ling Yiyao and take on a long-term contract project in Xinjiang, breaking up with her on the day he departs.

Years later, Ling Yiyao becomes engaged to Luo Tingyu under her mother's arrangement, but a phone call rekindles her old feelings for Lu Qinyang. They agree to meet at Jiayuguan railway station. Lu Qinyang had planned to propose there, but he is tragically caught in a blizzard.

Ling Yiyao waits at the station, while Lu Qinyang is found frozen in Xinjiang by his coworkers, still clutching the phone with which he meant to confess his love to her, a tear frozen at the corner of his eye.

== Cast ==
- Qu Chuxiao as Lu Qinyang
- Zhang Jingyi as Ling Yiyao
- Sun Ning as Da Qiao
- Zhang Yao as Jiang Qianqian
- Li Jiahao as Luo Tingyu

== Production ==
On May 28, 2019, filming for Love Will Tear Us Apart began in Nanjing. On August 16, the film successfully wrapped production in Dunhuang.

== Reception ==
The film grossed over 100 million yuan on its opening day, and surpassed 200 million yuan within five days.

It was re-released on May 20, 2022, earning 55 million yuan during the re-run, bringing its total cumulative box office to 380 million yuan.
