= Be My Friend =

"Be My Friend" may refer to:

- "Be My Friend", a song from the 1970 Free album Highway
- "Be My Friend", a 1982 single by Sneaky Feelings
- "Be My Friend", a song from the 2005 musical Edges
- "Be My Friend", a 2021 track from Yola's album Stand for Myself
