= Song Weilong (actor) =

Chinese actor and model

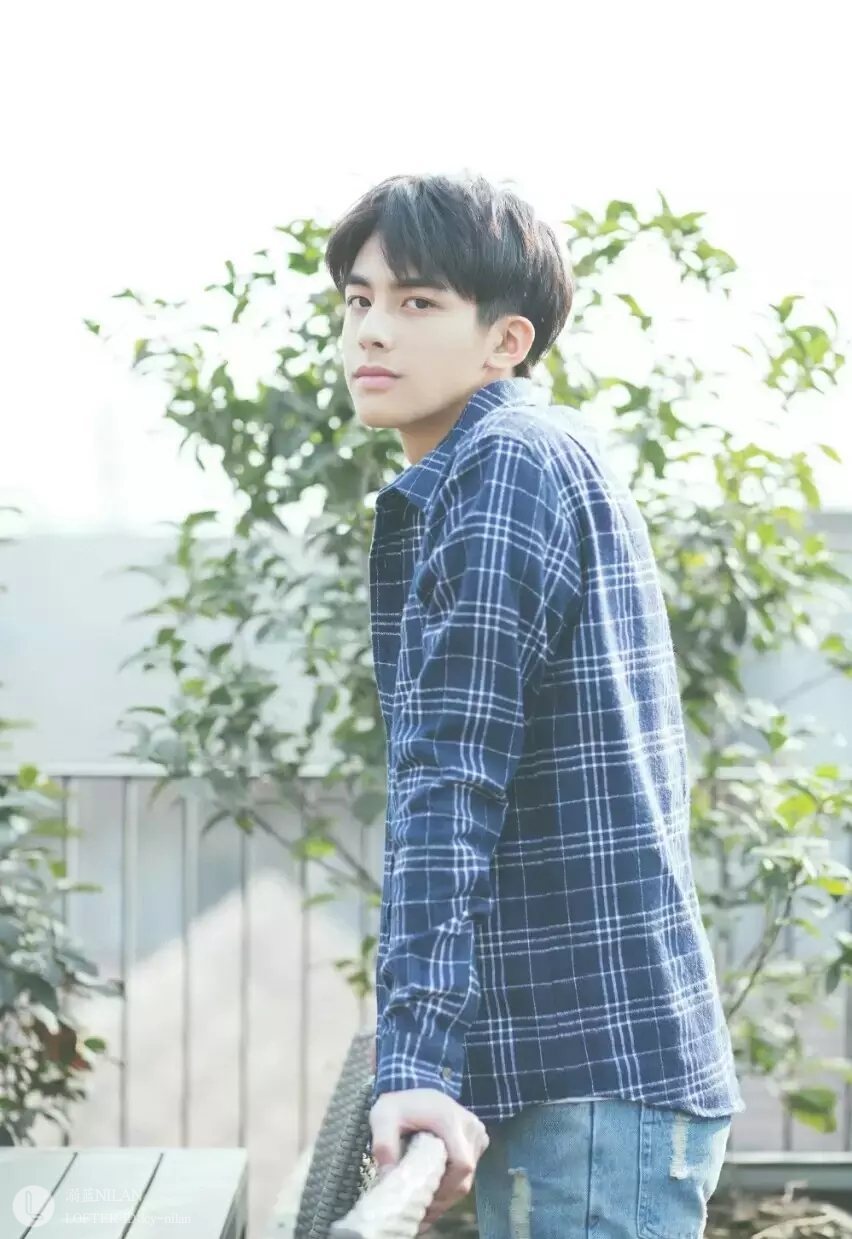
- Song in 2016
- Born: 25 March 1999 (age 27); Dalian, Liaoning, China
- Occupations: Actor; Model
- Years active: 2015–present
- Agent(s): Huanyu Entertainment (2015–2024)
- Notable work: Yuan Song in Find Yourself; Ling Xiao in Go Ahead; Lin Yusen in Shine On Me; Chen Yi in Love for You
- Height: 185 cm (6 ft 1 in)
- Honours: International Streaming Festival

Chinese name
- Simplified Chinese: 宋威龙
- Traditional Chinese: 宋威龍
Transcriptions
Standard Mandarin
- Hanyu Pinyin: Sòng Wēilóng
- Website: iQIYI • Viki

Song Weilong (Chinese: 宋威龙, born 25 March 1999) is a Chinese actor and model. He is known for his roles in Find Yourself, Go Ahead, Youthful Glory, Shine On Me and Love for You. In 2020, Forbes China listed him under "30 Under 30 Asia" category, for his professional contributions. In 2026, he won the People's Choice Best Actor Award at the 2025 International Streaming Festival's Global OTT Awards.

== Early life and education ==
Song was born in Dalian, Liaoning, he comes from a modest background and was raised with two older sisters. At age nine, inspired by Jet Li’s action films The New Legend of Shaolin, he developed an interest in martial arts. He trained in wushu, and eventually enrolled in Shaolin Tagou Martial Arts School, Henan.

== Career ==
=== 2015–2018: Beginnings ===
In 2015, Song Weilong signed with Huanyu Entertainment and officially became an actor. Initially, he appeared in the variety shows Run for Time and Day Day Up, which led to his increased recognition in China. In 2016, he made his debut in the fantasy drama Demon Girl II. Later, he starred in the Chinese-South Korean production Catman; and in youth film Passage of My Youth produced by Hong Kong cinematographer Cheung Ka-fai.

In 2017, Song starred in fantasy romance drama Long For You, adapted from the comic The Distance of Light Between You and Me. The series achieved 1billion viewership throughout its run. Additionally, he starred in the youth melodrama Beautiful Reborn Flower, historical drama Untouchable Lovers; and sci-fi adventure film Game Breaker.

=== 2019–2024: Breakthrough ===
In 2019, Song starred in the youth romance film Love The Way You Are, for which he won the 'Best New Actor' award at the China Movie Channel Media Awards.

In 2020, Song garnered widespread acclaim for his performance in the romantic comedy series Find Yourself, which had over 50 billion viewership. He then starred in the historical romance drama In a Class of Her Own. He gained immense recognition for his role in coming of age series Go Ahead, the series achieved 9,500 popularity heat index in IQIYI.

=== 2025-onwards: rising success ===
In 2025, Song starred in romantic series Shine on Me. It exceeded 1 billion views on Tencent Video, achieved 30,000 popularity index, and won him 'People Choice Male Award' at 2026 Korea International Streaming Festival (KISF) Global OTT Awards. In 2026, he starred in the romantic series Love for You, directed by Liu Junjie. It topped 'Weibo Drama Popularity Index', and surpassed 50 million views within two days.

== Influence ==
=== Ambassadorships ===
In 2020, Initially Song served as spokesperson for Burberry Beauty, later, British luxury fashion house Burberry appointed him as its ambassador. In 2022, Italian luxury fashion house Emporio Armani also announced him as their brand spokesperson for its Men's Watches in Greater China and the Asia-Pacific region.

Song was also announced first male global brand ambassador forJapanese high-end jewelry brand Mikimoto. In May 2024, Italian luxury fashion house Gucci announced him as its ambassador through Chinese Valentine's Day campaign.

=== Philanthropy ===
On March 19, 2016, Song attended the "Green Bicycle Tour" charity event in Chengdu as its youth ambassador.

== Filmography ==
=== Film ===
Year	English title	Chinese title	Role	Notes	Ref.
2018	Game Breaker	破梦游戏之不醒城	Nan Ji	Main role	
2019	Love the Way You Are	我的青春都是你	Fang Yuke	Main role	
2020	Passage of My Youth	岁月忽已暮	Jiang Hai	Main role	
2021	Catman	我爱喵星人	Miao Xingren	Supporting role	
2023	Just for Meeting You	念念相忘	Yang Yi	Main role	

=== Television/Web series ===
Year	English title	Chinese title	Role	Notes	Ref.
2016	Demon Girl II	半妖倾城 II	Ying Long	Supporting role	
2017	Long For You	我与你的光年距离	Gu Shiyi	Lead role	
2018	Untouchable Lovers	凤囚凰	Rong Zhi	Lead role	
2020	Find Yourself	下一站是幸福	Yuan Song	Lead role	
2020	Beautiful Reborn Flower	彼岸花	Lin Heping	Lead role	
2020	In a Class of Her Own	漂亮书生	Feng Chengjun	Lead role	
2020	Go Ahead	以家人之名	Ling Xiao	Lead role	
2023	A League of Nobleman	君子盟	Zhang Ping	Lead role	
2023	The Bionic Life	仿生人间	Cheng Nuo	Lead role	
2025	Everlasting Longing	相思令	Xuan Lie	Lead role	
2025	Youthful Glory	韶华若锦	Jiang Xu	Lead role	
2025	The Seven Relics of Ill Omen	七根心简	Luo Ren	Lead role	
2025	Shine on Me	骄阳似我	Lin Yusen	Lead role	
2026	The Eternal Fragrance	千香	Lei Xiuyuan	Lead role	
2026	Love for You	野狗骨头	Chen Yi	Lead role	

== Discography ==
Year	English title	Chinese title	Album	Notes	Ref.
2020	"Heart Warms Heart Equals to the World"	心暖心等于世界	Non-album single	COVID-19 pandemic public service song	

== Awards and nominations ==
Year	Event	Category	Nominated work	Result	Ref.
2017	OK! The Style Awards	Fashion New Idol Award	—N/a	Won	
2017	14th Esquire Man At His Best Awards	Newcomer of the Year	—N/a	Won	
2017	11th Tencent Video Star Awards	New Male Artist of the Year	—N/a	Won	
2017	24th Cosmo Beauty Ceremony	Beautiful Idol of the Year	—N/a	Won	
2017	Men's UNO YOUNG Awards	Most Promising Idol	—N/a	Won	
2019	China Movie Channel Media Awards	Best New Actor	Love the Way You Are	Won	
2020	7th The Actors of China Award Ceremony	Best Actor (Web series)	—N/a	Nominated	
2020	Jinri Toutiao Awards Ceremony	Most Popular Actor	—N/a	Won	
2026	Global OTT Awards	People's Choice Award: Male	Shine on Me	Won	
