= Palace 3: The Lost Daughter =

Chinese television series

- Traditional Chinese: 宮鎖連城
- Simplified Chinese: 宫锁连城
- Hanyu Pinyin: Gōngsuǒ Liánchéng
- Genre: Historical fiction romance
- Written by: Yu Zheng
- Directed by: Li Huizhu; Zheng Wei'en
- Starring: Yuan Shanshan; Lu Yi; Gao Yunxiang; Shirley Dai; Yang Rong
- Opening theme: "Lonely" by Yuan Shanshan
- Ending theme: "Won't Complain" by Yuan Shanshan
- Country of origin: China
- Original language: Mandarin
- No. of episodes: 44

Production
- Executive producer: Yu Zheng
- Production location: Hengdian World Studios
- Production companies: Hunan Economic Channel; Yu Zheng Studio

Original release
- Network: Hunan Television
- Release: 7 April – 4 May 2014

Related
- Palace II; Palace

Palace 3: The Lost Daughter (Chinese: 宫锁连城) is a 2014 Chinese television series written and produced by Yu Zheng, starring Yuan Shanshan, Lu Yi, Gao Yunxiang, Shirley Dai and Yang Rong. It is a sequel to the 2012 television series Palace II. The series was first broadcast on Hunan Television in mainland China from 7 April to 4 May 2014.

The series was a commercial success, and set a new ratings record for a drama’s initial broadcast on a provincial-level television channel for the year. It is later followed by the film The Palace (2013 film).

In December 2014, author Chiung Yao won a lawsuit against screenwriter Yu Zheng, claiming that he plagiarized Palace 3 from her 1992 novel Plum Blossom Scar. Yu was ordered to financially compensate Chiung and publicly apologize. He did the latter 6 years later after mounted pressure from 156 industry professionals threatening to boycott Yu.

== Plot ==
This story is set during the reign of the Qianlong Emperor. An orphan named Liancheng was rescued by Hengtai, the son of a general. She fell in love with him, but he instead developed feelings for Jiang Qimei, a woman from a brother.

Hengtai was determined to marry Qimei and Liancheng unhappily left him. Qimei soon abandons Hengtai, and Hengtai realizes his feelings for Liancheng. Jiang Yichen falls in love with Liancheng, and Princess Xingdai falls in love with Hengtai.

Princess Xingdai is a spoiled princess who is enamored with Hengtai. She is also the daughter of the Qianlong Emperor. Hengtai is forced to marry her due to her high social standing. She gives birth to a daughter, but Hengtai has feelings for Liancheng. He marries Liancheng as a concubine, and she suffers the schemes of Princess Xingdai and Hengtai's mother, Nalan Yingyue.

Liancheng's backstory is soon revealed, and she turns into a vicious woman. She drowns Princess Xingdai and Hengtai's young daughter, and causes Xingdai to fall ill. Liancheng even switches faces with Tong Yuxiu, Hengtai's sister-in-law.

== Cast ==
=== Main ===
- Mabel Yuan as Song Liancheng
- Lu Yi as Fuca Hengtai
- Gao Yunxiang as Jiang Yichen
- Shirley Dai as Xingdai
- Yang Rong as Tong Yuxiu

=== Supporting ===
- Alyssa Chia as Xingyu
- Kingdom Yuen as Mother Tan
- Kent Tong as Qianlong Emperor
- Wang Lin as Nalan Yingyue
- Kou Zhenhai as Fucha Wenghadai
- Zhang Yameng as Rumei
- Wang Renjun as Fucha Mingxuan
- Yang Mingna as Hoifa-Nara, the Step Empress
- Alice Chan as Liniang
- Shen Baoping as Minister Tong
- Madina Memet as Baile
- Zhang Tianyang as Guo Xiao
- Zhou Fang as Bu Qingyun
- Zhang Zhehan as Sun Heli
- Shao Min as Qin Xiang

=== Special appearances ===
- Bai Shan as Tian Wanniang
- Chen Xiao as Saman
- Huo Zhengyan as A Di
- Liu Xiaoxiao as Renshan
- Yin Xiaotian as General Duolong
- Mao Xiaotong as Chunxi
- Bao Bei'er

== Soundtrack ==
Palace 3 - Original Television Soundtrack (宫锁连城电视剧原声音乐大碟)
No.	Title	Music	Length
1.	"Won't Complain (不怨)"	Yuan Shanshan
2.	"Lonely (寂寞红)"	Yuan Shanshan
3.	"In Support of the Love (爱的供养)"	Lu Yi
4.	"Meet or not Meet (见与不见)"	Tan Xuan

== Plagiarism lawsuit ==
On April 2, 2014, a newspaper quoted actress Shirley Dai claiming that Palace 3: The Lost Daughter was actually based on Taiwanese writer Chiung Yao's 1992 novel Plum Blossom Scar (梅花烙). Writer-producer Yu Zheng then unleashed a rant on his Sina Weibo microblog calling "a certain actress" an attention whore.

Shortly after the drama aired in China on April 8, Chiung Yao released an open letter to China's State Administration of Press, Publication, Radio, Film and Television on April 15 accusing Yu Zheng of blatant plagiarism "unprecedented and beyond my endurance," seeking the immediate suspension of the broadcast of the TV series. Yu denied the claim, saying he was a fan of Chiung Yao with no intention of angering her. On April 28, a team led by Wang Jun from Beijing-based Yingke Law Firm filed a plagiarism lawsuit against Yu. Chiung Yao has received the public support of many, including Ruby Lin who starred in a Yu Zheng drama Beauty's Rival in Palace (2010).

On May 6, writer Li Yaling (李亚玲), who co-wrote 2 Yu Zheng dramas Pretty Maid (2010) and Spell of the Fragrance (2010), offered to be a witness to support Chiung Yao's lawsuit. She claimed that back in 2008 Yu had asked her to "borrow" Plum Blossom Scar's story for a new script, but she refused.

On July 14, Yu Zheng's objections to the jurisdiction of the case were denied by Beijing Third Intermediate People's Court.

On December 5, Beijing Third Intermediate People's Court convened the case. Wang Hailin (汪海林), executive director of Chinese Television Series Screenwriter Association, testified as expert witness for Chiung Yao's camp. On December 12, 109 Chinese screenwriters published a joint statement supporting Chiung Yao's lawsuit against Yu Zheng. A day later, an additional 30 Chinese screenwriters made their support of Chiung Yao known.

On December 25, the court ruled in Chiung Yao's favor, ordering 4 companies to stop distributing and broadcasting Palace 3: The Lost Daughter, also demanding Yu Zheng to publicly apologize, and pay Chiung Yao ¥5 million (around $800,000). China Radio International called it a "landmark ruling".
