= Palace II =

Chinese television series

- Poster
- Also known as: Locked Beaded Curtain
- Genre: Historical fiction Romance
- Written by: Yu Zheng
- Directed by: Lee Wai-chu
- Presented by: Ouyang Changlin
- Starring: Yuan Shanshan; Du Chun; Mickey He; Shu Chang; Jenny Zhang; Yang Rong; Sun Feifei
- Theme music composer: Tan Xuan
- Opening theme: In Support of the Love by Du Chun and Mickey He
- Ending theme: Buddha Says by Mickey He
- Country of origin: China
- Original language: Mandarin
- No. of episodes: 35

Production
- Executive producers: Lin Guohua; Zhang Huali; Gong Zhengwen; Sheng Boji; Li Hao; Wang Zeyong; Chen Yuan
- Producers: He Jin; Yu Zheng; Liu Xiangqun; Ji Yang; Li Xiuzhen
- Production location: China
- Editors: Jiang Xin; Jiang Xinjian; He Qunsheng; Yao Jia; Wang Jin; Wang Chengying
- Camera setup: Multi camera
- Running time: 45 minutes
- Production companies: Yu Zheng Workshop; Hunan ETV Culture Media Co., Ltd. H&R Century Pictures

Original release
- Network: Hunan Television
- Release: 20 January – 8 February 2012

Related
- Palace (2011); Palace 3 (2013); The Palace

Palace II
- Simplified Chinese: 宫II
- Traditional Chinese: 宮II
Transcriptions
Standard Mandarin
- Hanyu Pinyin: Gōng Èr

Gong Suo Zhu Lian
- Simplified Chinese: 宫锁珠帘
- Traditional Chinese: 宮鎖珠簾
- Literal meaning: Palace: The Locked Beaded Curtain
Transcriptions
Standard Mandarin
- Hanyu Pinyin: Gōng Suǒ Zhū Lián

Palace II (Chinese: 宫锁珠帘, lit. Locked Beaded Curtain) is a 2012 Chinese television series written and produced by Yu Zheng and directed by Lee Wai-chu. It is a sequel to the 2011 television series Palace. The series was first broadcast on HBS in China from 20 January to 8 February 2012. It was followed by Palace 3: The Lost Daughter (宫锁连城), and the film The Palace (2013 film), otherwise known as The Palace: Lock Sinensis (宫锁沉香).

== Synopsis ==
Luo Qingchuan, the time travelling protagonist in Palace, has returned from the Qing dynasty to the 21st century together with the eighth prince Yinsi, and they are married. Yinsi experiences difficulty in adapting to modern life, and Qingchuan is not doing well in her antique-selling business. Qingchuan changes her career and becomes a screenwriter. Her first story, based on her time travelling experience, is adapted into the popular television series Palace. Qingchuan is skyrocketed to fame, and she starts writing a sequel. One day, while on the set of Palace II, Qingchuan suddenly remembers that she and Yinsi are celebrating their wedding anniversary on that day. She declines to be the lead actress and recommends Lian'er, who is playing a supporting role, to be her replacement. The director considers carefully and eventually agrees to the suggestion.

Palace II is set in the Qing dynasty during the reign of the Yongzheng Emperor. Lian'er meets the 17th prince Yinli and they start a romantic relationship. However just as they are planning to get wed, Yinli is forced to give up on Lian'er in order to save his mentor Alingga, and he marries Alingga's daughter Jiajia instead. The heartbroken Lian'er wishes to leave the palace and lead a normal life, but she finds herself embroiled in complex circumstances: the official Li Wei proposes an alliance with her; the eunuch Su Peisheng wants to repay her kindness; her close friend Yushu betrays her.

Lian'er realises that although the members of the imperial household appear to get along harmoniously, they are actually constantly plotting against each other, and she is torn between rivaling factions. By coincidence, she catches the attention of the Yongzheng Emperor and rises through the ranks to become Consort Xi, and a stepmother to Yongzheng's son Hongli. At this point Lian'er discovers that she is now in a more complicated situation with various lurking dangers. By choosing to persevere and remain faithful to herself, believing that she can weather the storm, she eventually overcomes all odds and earns herself the dignity and respect she deserves.

== Cast ==
=== Main ===
- Yuan Shanshan as Niuhuru Lian'er, Consort Xi, the protagonist.
- Du Chun as Yinli, the 17th prince.
- Mickey He as Yinzhen, the fourth prince who becomes the Yongzheng Emperor.
  - Han Zixuan as young Yinzhen
- Shu Chang as Bo Haitang, Concubine Yun. She is Concubine Wan and Xixiang's rival. Shu Chang simultaneously played Bo Mudan, Haitang's twin sister.
- Jenny Zhang as Genggiya Yushu, Concubine Yu. She was originally Lian'er's friend but later became her foe. The character is based on Imperial Noble Consort Chunque.
- Yang Rong as Xugiya Xixiang, Noble Lady Qian. She is Concubine Wan's cousin and Concubine Yun's rival. The character is based on Consort Qian.
- Sun Feifei as Ula Nara Zhen'er, Lian'er's friend and love rival. The character is based on Empress Xiaojingxian.

=== Supporting ===
- Michelle Bai as Geng Shuwan, Concubine Wan. She is Xixiang's cousin and Concubine Yun's rival. The character is based on Consort Ning.
- Leanne Liu as Consort De, the deceased empress dowager. She was the birth mother of Yinzhen and Yinti.
- Tien Niu as Grand Consort Qin, the birth mother of Yinli.
- Michelle Yim as Bo Yun, a prostitute, and mother of Haitang and Mudan.
- Hai Lu as Niuhuru Jiajia, Yinli's wife.
- Kent Tong as Alingga, Jiajia's father. He is a mentor and father-in-law to Yinli.
- Bao Bei'er as Su Peisheng, a high-ranking eunuch.
- Wei Qianxiang as Yinti, the 14th prince.
- Ma Wenlong as Ula Nara Zhalantai, Zhen'er's younger brother and Xixiang's lover.
- Li Man as Jingiya Xiuli, Concubine Xiu, Hongli's birth mother. The character is based on Consort Qi.
- Wang Yang as Li Wei, the minister of justice and Concubine Yun's lover.
- Chen Xiao as Yinxi, the 19th prince.
- Jiang Ruijia as Niuhuru Rong'er, Yinxi's wife and Lian'er's younger sister.
- Zhou Shaodong as Niuhuru Lingzhu, father of Lian'er and Rong'er.
- Liu Fang as Guwalgiya Yuying, Lingzhu's wife, and mother of Lian'er and Rong'er.
- Chen Xu as Hongli, the Yongzheng Emperor's son and future Qianlong Emperor.
  - Han Zixuan as young Hongli
- Zhao Jingyu as Daniu, Concubine Wan's daughter.
- Liu Bin as Yin'e, the 10th prince.
- Sun Jian as Li Qingxi, a eunuch.
- Ru Ping as Erma, Yinli's nanny.
- Shen Baoping as Zhang Tingyu, a minister.
- Yang Yaotian as Xiongkui, a mysterious man.
- Hao Ziming as Zeng Jing
- Shao Min as Xiuchun
- Ai Long as Yuanshou
- Wang Lin as Panchun
- Xue Jianing as Wenyue
- Li Xiang as Mrs Zhang
- Xia Yang as Bingyan
- Luo Ting as Wu Yong
- Zeng Zhen as Xuezhen
- Lü Jiarong as Shuangshuang
- Zhao Jinjun as a eunuch
- Marco Li as Commander Cui

=== Special appearances ===
- Yang Mi as Luo Qingchuan, the protagonist of Palace. Yang Mi simultaneously played Huaying, a palace maid.
- Feng Shaofeng as Yinsi, the eighth prince who traveled through time to the 21st century together with Qingchuan and married her.
- Zanilia Zhao as Tunggiya Baihe, an assassin planning to kill the Yongzheng Emperor.
- Sonija Kwok as herself, a Hong Kong actress who guest stars in the last episode.

== Soundtrack ==
Palace II - Original Television Soundtrack (宫锁珠帘电视剧原声音乐大碟)
No.	Title	Music	Length
1.	"In Support of the Love (爱的供养)"	Du Chun & Mickey He
2.	"Buddha Says (佛说)"	Mickey He
3.	"Song of Lovesickness (相思曲)"	Yuan Shanshan, Jenny Zhang & Shu Chang
4.	"Glory (辉煌)"	Yan Danchen
5.	"One More Time (再来一次)"	Zhang Zixuan
6.	"Falling Petals (落花)"

== Awards ==
Year	Award	Category	Winner	Ref.
2012	China TV Golden Eagle Award	Audience's Choice for Actor	Mickey He	
2012	China TV Drama Awards	Most Popular Actor	Du Chun	
