= Palace (TV series) =

Chinese television series

- Official poster
- Also known as: Jade Palace Lock Heart
- Genre: Historical fiction Romance; Time-travel
- Developed by: HBS
- Written by: Yu Zheng
- Directed by: Lee Wai-chu
- Starring: Yang Mi; Feng Shaofeng; Mickey He; Tong Liya
- Theme music composer: Tan Xuan
- Opening theme: In Support of the Love by Mickey He(episodes 1–20), by Yang Mi(episodes 21–35)
- Ending theme: Meet or not Meet by Mickey He
- Country of origin: China
- Original language: Mandarin
- No. of episodes: 35 (39)(Hunan TV first broadcast the version with 39 episodes, not the general version with 35)

Production
- Producers: Yu Zheng; He Jin
- Production locations: Dongyang; Zhejiang; Hengdian World Studios
- Running time: 45 minutes (per episode)
- Production companies: Hunan ETV Culture Media; Yuzheng Studio; H&R Century Pictures

Original release
- Network: Hunan Television
- Release: 31 January – 21 February 2011

Palace
- Traditional Chinese: 宮
- Simplified Chinese: 宫
Transcriptions
Standard Mandarin
- Hanyu Pinyin: Gōng
Yue: Cantonese
- Jyutping: Gung1

Jade Palace Lock Heart
- Traditional Chinese: 宮鎖心玉
- Simplified Chinese: 宫锁心玉
Transcriptions
Standard Mandarin
- Hanyu Pinyin: Gōng Suǒ Xīn Yù
Yue: Cantonese
- Jyutping: Gung1 So2 Sam1 Juk6

Palace (Chinese: 宫锁心玉, lit. Jade Palace Lock Heart) is a 2011 Chinese television series produced by Yu Zheng and directed by Lee Wai-chu, starring Yang Mi, Feng Shaofeng, Mickey He and Tong Liya. The series was first broadcast on Hunan TV in China from 31 January to 21 February 2011. It is later followed by Palace 2 (Chinese: 宮鎖珠帘) (2012), Palace 3: The Lost Daughter (Chinese: 宫锁连城), and the film The Palace (2013 film).

The series was a runaway success, propelling its cast to widespread fame.

== Synopsis ==
Luo Qingchuan (Yang Mi) is a modern-day actress. One day she decided to try a romantic role which she has never done before so she scouted around and found a director who intended to direct and produce a romance drama set in the Qing Dynasty, during the reign of Emperor Yongzheng.

The rest of the drama is focused on her character becoming embroiled in the princes' struggle for the throne and is torn between her love for Yin Si (Feng Shaofeng), the eighth prince, and Yin Zhen (Mickey He), the fourth prince and future Emperor Yongzheng. She is also betrayed by her friend Tong Suyan (Tong Liya). Caught in the crossfire of political intrigue, her wit and compassion serve her well in her bid to stay alive.

== Cast ==
=== Main ===
- Yang Mi as Luo Qingchuan
- Feng Shaofeng as Yinsi, the 8th prince
- Mickey He as Yinzhen, the 4th prince
- Tong Liya as Tong Suyan

=== Supporting ===
==== The Imperial Men ====
- Kent Tong as the Kangxi Emperor
- Zong Fengyan as Yinreng, the crown prince
- Ma Wenlong as Yintang, the 9th prince
- Liu Bin as Yin'e, the 10th prince
- Tian Zhenwei as Yinxiang, the 13th prince
- Mao Zijun as Yinti, the 14th prince

==== The Imperial Women ====
- Leanne Liu as Consort De
- Sonija Kwok as Concubine Xi
- Maggie Shiu as Consort Liang / Empress Hešeri
- Amber Xu as Jinzhi
- Vicki He as Xueru, the Crown princess
- Zhang Tong as Princess Bingyue

==== People of the Palace ====
- Shen Baoping as Longkodo
- Wilson Guo as Xiao Shunzi
- Lu Jiarong as Fei Cui
- Ye Simiao as Jin Momo
- Liu Jiayuan as Xin Lian
- Lu Yi as Ying Shuang
- Yuan Shanshan as Ru Bing

==== Others ====
- Xi Xue as Princess Ningxiang
- He Xianda as Songgotu
- Wang Xianghong as Gu Xiaochun (later Nian Gengyao)
- Li Qindong as Nian Gengyao

==== Present day ====
- Yan Yikuan as Lin Feifan
- Liu Fang as Qingchuan's mother
- Zhu Yaying as Lin Feifan's mother

== Historical inaccuracies ==
- One historical inaccuracy is that although this is a historical drama, the protagonist Luo Qingchuan was shown wearing yellow even when she was not a member of the imperial household. It is a very serious inaccuracy because in Imperial China, such a disregard could have someone put to death by the Emperor for not respecting this custom.

== Soundtrack ==
Palace - Original Television Soundtrack (宫锁心玉电视剧原声音乐大碟)
No.	Title	Music	Length
1.	"The Offering to Love (爱的供养)"	Yang Mi & Mickey He
2.	"Meet or not Meet (见或不见)"	Mickey He
3.	"Tomorrow's Night (明月)"	Yang Mi & Tan Xuan

== Awards ==
Year	Award	Category	Winner	Ref.
2011	Shanghai Television Festival	Most Popular Actress	Yang Mi	
2011	Asian Television Awards	Best Drama Screenplay	Yu Zheng	
2011	LeTV Entertainment Awards	Best Television Series		

== See also ==
- Scarlet Heart
