= Empress Xiaojingxian =

Empress of China from 1723 to 1731

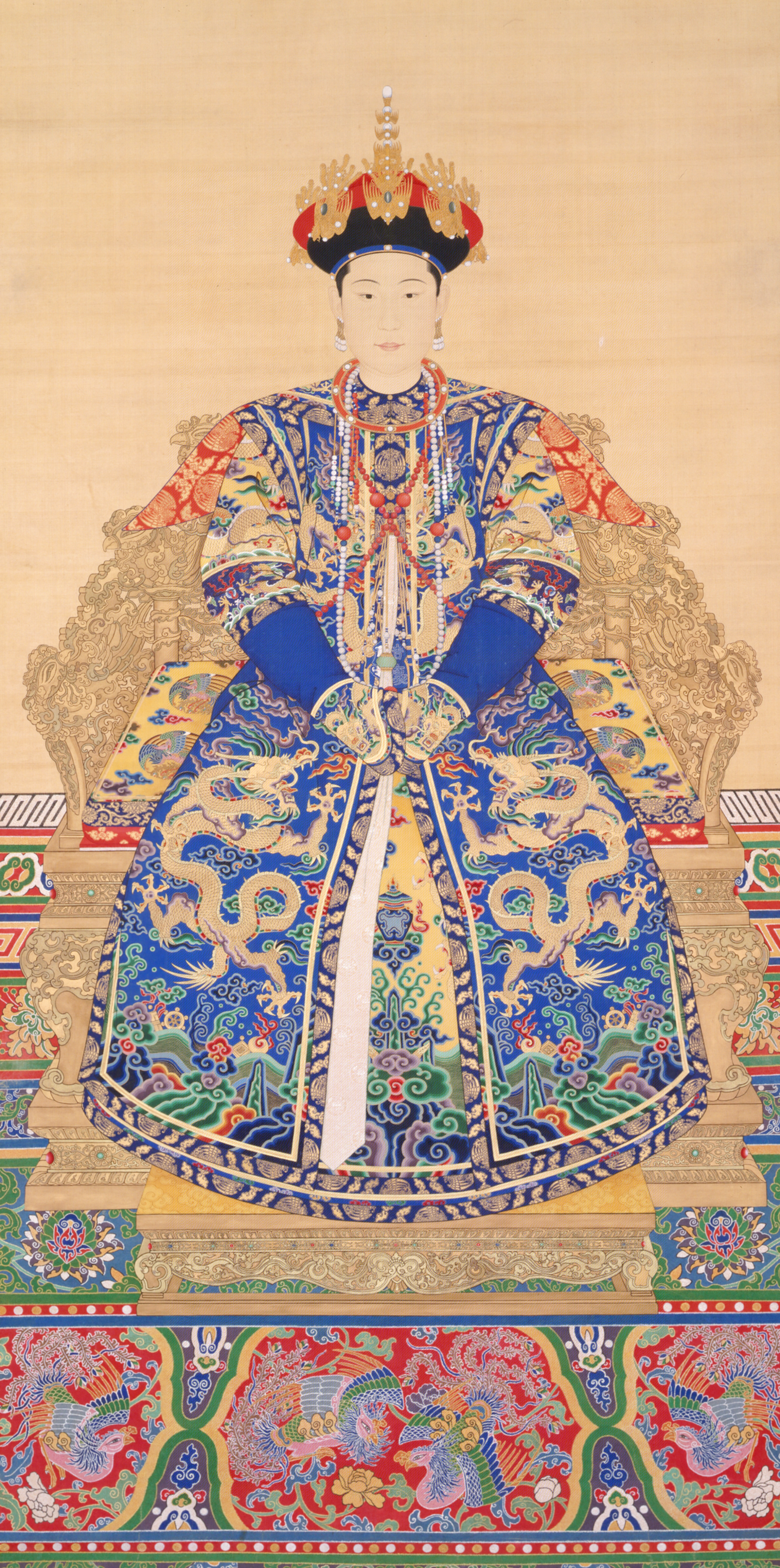

Empress consort of the Qing dynasty
- Tenure: 28 March 1723 – 29 October 1731
- Predecessor: Empress Xiaoyiren
- Successor: Empress Xiaoxianchun
- Born: 28 June 1681
- Died: 29 October 1731 (aged 50); Changchun Garden, Old Summer Palace, Beijing, Qing China
- Burial: Tai Mausoleum, Western Qing Tombs
- Spouse: Yongzheng Emperor (m. 1691)
- Issue: Honghui (弘暉)
Posthumous name
- Empress Xiaojing Gonghe Yishun Zhaohui Zhuangsu Ankang Zuotian Yisheng Xian (孝敬恭和懿順昭惠莊肅安康佐天翊聖憲皇后)
- House: Ula Nara (烏拉那拉; by birth); Aisin Gioro (by marriage)
- Father: Fiyanggū (費揚古)
- Mother: Lady Aisin Gioro

Empress Xiaojingxian

Chinese name
- Traditional Chinese: 孝敬憲皇后
- Simplified Chinese: 孝敬宪皇后
Transcriptions
Standard Mandarin
- Hanyu Pinyin: Xiàojìngxiàn Huánghòu

Manchu name
- Manchu script: ᡥᡳᠶᠣᠣᡧᡠᠩᡤᠠ ᡝᠩᡤᡠᠨ ᡨᡝᠮᡤᡝᡨᡠᠯᡝᡥᡝ ᡥᡡᠸᠠᠩᡥᡝᠣ
- Romanization: hiyoošungga enggun temgetulehe hūwangheo

Empress Xiaojingxian (28 June 1681 – 29 October 1731), of the Manchu Plain Yellow Banner, was the primary wife and empress consort of the Yongzheng Emperor of China's Qing dynasty from 1723 until her death in 1731. Following her passing, the Yongzheng Emperor did not elevate any of his other consorts to the position of empress.

== Family background ==
- Father: Fiyanggū (費揚古/费扬古), often confused as the Fiyanggū who served as a first rank military official (領侍衛內大臣/领诗卫内大臣), and held the title of a first-class duke (一等公). In fact, the Empress' father was from the Ula Nara family and was only posthumously named Duke in the 13th year of Yongzheng. The Fiyanggū who was a military officer was the younger brother of Consort Dong'E, the favourite concubine of Emperor Shunzhi, grandfather of Emperor Yongzheng.
  - Paternal grandfather: Bohucha (博瑚察). He was married to the great-great-granddaughter of Nurhachi, the founder of the Qing Dynasty.
- Mother: Lady Aisin Gioro
  - Maternal grandfather: Murhu (穆爾祜/穆尔祜; d. 29 January 1655), Cuyen's grandson
  - Maternal grandmother: Lady Borjigin
- Three elder brothers and one younger brother

== Kangxi era ==
Lady Ula Nara was born on the 13th day of the fifth lunar month in the 20th year of the reign of the Kangxi Emperor, which translates to 28 June 1681 in the Gregorian calendar.

In 1691, she married Yinzhen, the fourth son of the Kangxi Emperor, and became his primary consort. After her death, Yinzhen's mourning lament stated that when they married, she was a child; indeed, at the time of their marriage she was only 10 years old. On 17 April 1697, she gave birth to their first son, Honghui, who would die while still a child on 7 July 1704.

== Yongzheng era ==
The Kangxi Emperor died on 20 December 1722 and was succeeded by Yinzhen, who was enthroned as the Yongzheng Emperor. On 28 March 1723, Lady Ula Nara, as the Yongzheng Emperor's primary consort, was instated as empress and put in charge of the emperor's harem.

She died on 29 October 1731 and was interred in the Tai Mausoleum of the Western Qing Tombs.

== Titles ==
- During the reign of the Kangxi Emperor (r. 1661–1722):
  - Lady Ula Nara (烏拉那拉氏; from 28 June 1681)
  - Primary Consort (嫡福晋; from 1691)
- During the reign of the Yongzheng Emperor (r. 1722–1735):
  - Empress (皇后; from 28 March 1723)
  - Empress Xiaojing (孝敬皇后; from December 1731 or January 1732)
- During the reign of the Qianlong Emperor (r. 1735–1796):
  - Empress Xiaojingxian (孝敬憲皇后; from 1737)

== Issue ==
- As primary consort:
  - Honghui (弘暉/弘晖; 17 April 1697 – 7 July 1704), the Yongzheng Emperor's first son

== In fiction and popular culture ==
- Portrayed by Zhuang Li in Yongzheng Dynasty (1999)
- Portrayed by Amber Xu in Palace (2011)
- Portrayed by Mu Tingting in Scarlet Heart (2011)
- Empress Chunyuan/Ula-Nara Yixiu in Empresses in the Palace (2011)
- Portrayed by Sun Feifei in Palace II (2012)
- Portrayed by Annie Yi in The Palace (2013)
- Portrayed by Joan Chen in Ruyi's Royal Love in the Palace (2018)

== See also ==
- Imperial Chinese harem system § Qing
- Royal and noble ranks of the Qing dynasty

== Notes ==
Empress Xiaojingxian Ula-Nara Clan
Chinese royalty
Preceded by Empress Xiaoyiren of the Tunggiya clan	Empress consort of China; 28 March 1723 – 29 October 1731	Succeeded by Empress Xiaoxianchun of the Fuca clan
