= Mickey He =

Chinese actor and singer (born 1976)

He Shengming
- Born: 何敏; He Min; July 9, 1976 (age 50); Xiantao, Hubei, China
- Other name: 何味奇 (He Weiqi)
- Occupations: Actor, Singer
- Years active: 1996–present

Chinese name
- Traditional Chinese: 何晟銘
- Simplified Chinese: 何晟铭
Transcriptions
Standard Mandarin
- Hanyu Pinyin: Hé Shèngmíng
Yue: Cantonese
- Jyutping: Ho4 Sing4 Ming4
- Musical career
- Genres: Mandopop, Cantopop

He Shengming (born He Min on July 9, 1976) is a Chinese actor and singer. Born in Xiantao, Hubei, he moved to Guangzhou, Guangdong in the early 1990s to pursue a music career. Along with Peng Liang and Yang Guang, he formed the boy band China Power in 1996. He left the group in 1998 to pursue a solo career under the stage name He Weiqi, but failed to gain traction. In 2004, he changed his stage name to He Shengming and relocated to Beijing for a training program at the Beijing Film Academy, after which he transitioned into acting. He experienced a major career revival in the late 2000s and early 2010s through starring roles in productions by Yu Zheng, but his prominence declined again following their breakup in 2013.

== Career ==
He Min was born in Xiantao, Hubei, People's Republic of China on July 9, 1976. He has one older brother, Hairong. As a result, close relatives and friends often call him Xiao Hai ("Little Hai"). In 1996, He moved to Guangzhou, Guangdong and formed the short-lived boy band China Power with members Peng Liang and Yang Guang. China Power was extremely popular in the Cantonese music scene, and the group won "Best Group" at the first annual Chinese Singing Awards, which was held in Hong Kong in 1997.

As the lead vocalist, He was the most popular member. In 1998, with the support of his then girlfriend, a Hong Kong businesswoman, he left China Power to pursue a solo career under the stage name He Weiqi, adopted from the name of her Shenzhen food company. He released his first album in 1999, which received lukewarm responses. In 2004, he changed his stage name again and moved to Beijing, enrolling in a three-month training program at Beijing Film Academy. He attempted to return to the music scene in 2005, using his first stage name He Min. He was unsuccessful, and retired to working as a backstage visual supervisor instead.

Yu Zheng, the Chinese screenwriter and showrunner, discovered He and cast him a role in Rose Martial World (2008). Following this, He frequently collaborated with Yu in TV dramas, such as Beauty's Rival in Palace (2009), Pretty Maid (2009), and Happy Mother-in-Law, Pretty Daughter-in-Law (2010). He experienced a major career revival for his role as the Fourth Imperial Prince in the time-travel drama Palace (2011), also a Yu Zheng production. His other notable credits in Yu's productions include Abandoned Secret, Spell of the Fragrance, Palace II, Beauty World, Desperate Love, and Allure Love.

After his breakup with Yu in 2013, his career experienced another downturn. He has since taken on roles in spy and war dramas Tongbai Hero and Hunt Wolf, medical drama OB Gyns, and wuxia drama The Four.

== Filmography ==
=== Film ===
Year	English title	Chinese title	Role	Notes
2009	Love, Bring Me Home	爱，回家	Gao Lei	
2010	Detective Dee and the Mystery of the Phantom Flame	狄仁傑之通天帝國	soldier	extra
2011	Cold Steel	遍地狼烟	He Yaowu / Xiao Wu	
2012	On the Way	跑出一片天	Talkative judge	
2013	Find Your True Self	寻回真实的自己	CEO He	

=== Television series ===
Year	English title	Chinese title	Role	Notes	Ref
2001	The Eliminators	重拳出击	Xiong Zhongjie		
2004		挪林滩大道东	Tang Jun		
2008	One Thousand Teardrops	一千滴眼泪	Wan Jiahui		
2009	Rose Martial World	玫瑰江湖	Lin Chuyi		
2009	Four Women Conflict	锁清秋	Ling Yun		
2009		难为女儿红	Shen Junsheng	Cameo	
2009	Good Wife and Mother	贤妻良母	Chen Jiaye		
2010	Beauty's Rival in Palace	美人心计	Zhou Yafu		
2010	Pretty Maid	大丫鬟	Shen Liunian		
2010	Happy Mother-in-Law, Pretty Daughter-in-Law	欢喜婆婆俏媳妇	Tie Changhuan		
2010	Spell of the Fragrance	国色天香	Gong Shaohua		
2011	Palace	宫锁心玉	Yinzhen		
2011	Beauty World	唐宫美人天下	Pei Shaoqing		
2011	Abandoned Secret	被遗弃的秘密	Dai Yongcheng		
2012	Palace II	宫锁珠帘	Yinzhen		
2012	Allure Snow	倾城雪	Fang Tianyu		
2012	Desperate Love	倾城绝恋	Jingxuan		
2013	King of the Wind	王者清风	Qianlong Emperor		
2013	Tongbai Hero	桐柏英雄	Zhaog Yongsheng		
2013	Hunt Wolf	猎天狼	Yang Tianxiao		
2013	Prenuptial Agreement	婚前协议	Zhang Kaiming		
2014	OB Gyns	爱的妇产科	Yang Junbo		
2015	The Four	少年四大名捕	An Shidi		
2015		给幸福下订单	Zhou Dafang		
2015	Empyrean Doctor	半为苍生半美人	Huatuo		
2015	The Direction of Happiness	幸福的方向	Liu Xinghe		
2016	Transition from Liping	生死黎平	Wang Dalei		
2016	The Legend of Du Xinwu	杜心五传奇	Du Xinwu		
2017	Gone with the Red Dust	怒海红尘	Lin Xiao		
2017	Anti-terrorism Special Forces II	反恐特战队之猎影	Jiang Han		
2020	Love and Redemption	琉璃	Gong Zhu		
TBA	The Imperial Age	江山纪	Zhu Biao		
TBA	Rights and Benefits	权与利			
2021	Meng Xing Chang An	梦醒长安	Chou Shiliang		

== Discography ==
=== Albums ===
Year	English title	Chinese title	Notes
1999	Why is the Taste of Love so Beautiful?	为何爱情的滋味是这么奇美	
2001	Reverie	梦见何味奇	
2004	Flame	火焰	
2006	Entertainment Effect	娱乐效应	

=== Singles ===
Year	English title	Chinese title	Album	Notes
2011	"With You It's Brighter"	有你更光亮	热门华语166	
2012	"Rock"	石头	—N/a	
2013	"2012 Continue to be Cute"	2012萌下去	—N/a	
2016	"Twenty Years Later"	二十年后	—N/a	
2016	"Rainbowed"	彩虹了	—N/a	
2016	"Northern Lights"	北极光	—N/a	
2017	"Mother's Smile"	母亲的微笑	—N/a	

=== Soundtracks ===
Year	English title	Chinese title	Film/Television series	Notes
2007	"Song of Jianghu"	江湖谣	Rose Martial World	
2008	"Heaven and Earth do not Tolerate"	天地不容	Four Women Conflict	with Tang Hongfei
2008	"Locking the Cooling Autumn"	锁清秋	Four Women Conflict	
2009	"Goodbye"	再见	One Thousand Teardrops	
2009	"One Thousand Teardrops"	一千滴眼泪	One Thousand Teardrops	with Jiang Hong
2009	"Four Seasons"	四季	One Thousand Teardrops	
2009	"Forever"	永远	Good Wife and Mother	
2009	"Reborn"	重生	Good Wife and Mother	
2009	"Like Flowers"	如花	Pretty Maid	
2009		椒房殿	Beauty's Rival in Palace	
2010	"The Song of Happiness"	欢喜歌	Happy Mother-in-Law, Pretty Daughter-in-Law	with Myolie Wu
2010	"Formidable"	厉害了	Happy Mother-in-Law, Pretty Daughter-in-Law	
2010	"As Good as Water"	上善若水	Spell of the Fragrance	
2010	"Don't Ask Who I Am"	别问我是谁	Spell of the Fragrance	special version of "As Good as Water"
2010	"Can't Go Back"	回不去	Spell of the Fragrance	with Sunny Deng
2010	"In Support of the Love"	爱的供养	Palace	with Ying Xiang
2010	"Meet or Not"	见或不见	Palace	
2010	"Song of Tang"	唐歌	Beauty World	
2011	"Hidden Heart"	藏心	Abandoned Secret	
2011	"Thousand Piles of Snow"	千堆雪	Abandoned Secret	
2011	"Eternity is not a Form of Calculation of Love"	永恒是不可计算的爱	Sea Mother	
2011	"Cold Steel"	遍地狼烟	Cold Steel	
2012	"In Support of the Love"	爱的供养	Palace II	with Du Chun (new version)
2012	"Sayings of the Buddha"	佛说	Palace II	
2012	"Blooming of the Epiphyllum flower"	昙花一现	Allure Snow	
2012	"Allure Snow"	倾城雪	Allure Snow	
2012	"No Choice"	无奈	Prenuptial Agreement	
2012	"Hunt"	猎	Hunt Wolf	
2012	"Don't Ask"	不问	Old Days in Shanghai	
2013	"Only Love Knows"	只有爱情知道	OB Gyns	
2013	"It's Always Been You"	一直都是你	OB Gyns	
2014	"Faith"	信仰	Tongbai Hero	
2015	"Defy Missing You"	逆相思	The Four	
2015	"Hero"	英雄	Jin Yuyao	
2015	"Go with the Flow"	顺其自然	The Legend of Du Xinwu	
2015	"Love Song"	恋歌	Demon Girl	
2019	"Tower of Happiness and Sadness"	悲喜楼	Listening Snow Tower OST	
2020	"If Just Like This"	若就这样了	Love and Redemption OST	

== Awards ==
Year	Award	Category	Nominated work	Notes
2011	6th Huading Awards	Best Actor (Comedy Drama)	Happy Mother-in-Law, Pretty Daughter-in-Law	
2011	6th Huading Awards	Best Original Soundtrack	"In Support of the Love"	
2012	26th China TV Golden Eagle Award	Best Actor	Palace II	
