= Sun Feifei =

Sun Feifei or Feifei Sun may refer to:

- Sun Feifei (actress) (born 1981), Chinese actress
- Fei Fei Sun (born 1989), Chinese model
