= Yu Zheng =

Chinese screenwriter

- 于正
- Born: 28 February 1978 (age 48); Haining, Zhejiang, China
- Education: Shanghai Theatre Academy
- Occupations: Screenwriter, producer
- Years active: 2003–present
- Organization: Yu Zheng Studio (Huanyu Film)

Yu Zheng (Chinese: 于正; pinyin: Yú Zhèng; born 28 February 1978) is a Chinese screenwriter and showrunner. Founder of Huanyu Entertainment, Yu is known for the historical romance dramas Palace (2011), Story of Yanxi Palace (2018), and The Double (2024), as well as for his high-profile, outspoken, and sometimes controversial media presence.

== Biography ==
=== Early life ===
Yu was born and raised in Haining, Zhejiang. After high school, he moved to Shanghai, where he became an auditor at Shanghai Theatre Academy.

=== Career ===
In August 1998, Yu signed with TVB as a screenwriter. One year later, he signed with Li Huimin Studio (Chinese: 李惠民工作室). In July 2003, Yu transferred to Taiwan Star International Entertainment Company (Chinese: 台湾星之国际娱乐公司). In 2008, he founded Yu Studio (Chinese: 于正工作室). In June 2009, he founded the Quansheng Time Film and Television Company (Chinese: 全盛时代影视公司). In 2012, Yu co-founded Huanyu Entertainment with Yang Le (Coco Yang), subsuming Yu Studio.

== Controversies ==
=== Feuds ===
==== Raymond Lee ====
In December 2004, Yu, then a total unknown, was threatening to sue director Raymond Lee over the drama Assassinator Jing Ke, because Yu's name did not appear in the credits. Lee did not respond, but writer Wang Qiuyu (Chinese: 王秋雨) published a blog asking for Yu's apology, adding "Finally some sincere advices to Yu, a creator is not a businessman. Spend more time creating, less energy on gaining exposures." Yu did not follow up on his legal threats. Talking about the incident in 2014, Lee said, "Yu is very smart, he knows how to make himself known."

==== Ruby Lin ====
In 2010, actress Ruby Lin, who starred in Yu-produced Beauty's Rival in Palace, declined to participate in his subsequent project, Beauty World, opting instead to become a producer. Many actors from Beauty's Rival in Palace chose to join Lin's debut project, The Glamorous Imperial Concubine, over Beauty World. On December 12, Yu posted on his Weibo account, insinuating that "someone" was a copycat of his production. Lin responded by expressing her disappointment at Yu, who later denied that his comments were directed at Lin. Despite this, he continued his veiled attacks, writing on Sina Weibo: "What are the benefits for an actress to become a producer?...The correct answer is, for a chance to make out with all the young, hot guys!" In 2014, Yu suggested on a talk show that Lin was his most despised actress due to her "double-dealing." In 2016, half a month after Lin's marriage to Wallace Huo, Yu posted on Weibo a photo of Lin's wedding pastries, extending his best wishes for her, indicating a reconciliation of their years-long feud.

==== Xi Xin ====
On October 30, 2012, Yu alleged on his Weibo that a "certain director" had fired an actress for refusing his sexual advances. On November 6, director Xi Xin (Chinese: 习辛) publicly accused Yu of defamation and filed a lawsuit when Yu refused to apologize. In November 2013, Beijing First Intermediate People's Court ruled in Xi's favor.

==== Shen Tai ====
On March 18, 2013, Yu was physically assaulted by actor Shen Tai (Chinese: 沈泰) in a coffee shop. Shen served three days in detention but refused to apologize. Yu claimed he was beaten because he refused Shen's demands for a role in his drama. Shen denied this allegation and wrote on Weibo: "Everybody has a bottom line. Knowing such a person can only be described as disgusting. If he does stupid things again, I will slap him just the same."

=== Plagiarism ===
==== Chiung Yao ====
On April 2, 2014, actress Shirley Dai claimed that the Yu TV drama Palace 3: The Lost Daughter she starred in was based on Taiwanese writer Chiung Yao's 1992 novel Plum Blossom Scar (Chinese: 《梅花烙》). Yu responded with a rant on his Weibo, calling "a certain actress" an attention seeker.

Shortly after the drama aired in China on April 7, Chiung Yao released an open letter to China's State Administration of Press, Publication, Radio, Film and Television on April 15, accusing Yu of blatant plagiarism and seeking the immediate suspension of the TV series broadcast. Yu denied the claim, stating he was a fan of Chiung Yao with no intention of offending her. On April 28, a team led by Wang Jun from Beijing-based Yingke Law Firm filed a plagiarism lawsuit against Yu.

On April 17, novelist Meiyuzhe (Chinese: 寐语者) claimed that Palace 3: The Lost Daughter plagiarized not only Chiung Yao's novel but also her own The Imperial Enterprise (Chinese: 《帝王业》). Meiyuzhe claimed that it was not the first time Yu plagiarized from her novels.

On July 14, Beijing Third Intermediate People's Court denied Yu's objections to the jurisdiction of the Chiung Yao lawsuit. On December 12, 109 Chinese screenwriters published a joint statement supporting Chiung Yao's lawsuit against Yu. The following day, an additional 30 Chinese screenwriters expressed their support for Chiung Yao. On December 25, 2014, the court ruled in Chiung Yao's favor, ordering four companies to stop distributing and broadcasting The Palace: The Lost Daughter. The court also demanded that Yu publicly apologize and pay Chiung Yao ¥5 million ($800,000).

==== Other plagiarism ====
Yu's 2006 drama Concubines of the Qing Emperor (Chinese: 《大清后宫》) had been suspected of plagiarizing the Hong Kong drama War and Beauty (2004). Yu denied it, but stated that his drama "contained the successful parts of classic dramas like War and Beauty, Dae Jang Geum, and Winter Sonata".

Yu's 2011 hit drama Palace was allegedly a plagiarism of several television series and novels, including Tong Hua's Bu Bu Jing Xin as well as the Taiwanese series Meteor Garden. On June 3, 2014, Tong Hua threatened legal actions if Yu continued his plagiarism.

Writers Fu Xing (Chinese: 傅星) and He Zizhuang (Chinese: 贺子壮) have claimed that, in 2003, Yu and Fu Xing co-wrote a script for the drama Take Me to Fly, Take Me for a Walk (Chinese: 《带我飞，带我走》). Whereas Fu came up with all the characters and relationships, Yu claimed all the credits when he published the script as a book. Yu later wrote an apology letter to Fu, who forgave him. Yu also offered to compensate Fu ¥30,000 but never did.

On May 6, writer Li Yaling (Chinese: 李亚玲), who co-wrote 2 Yu dramas Pretty Maid (2010) and Spell of the Fragrance (2010), offered to be a witness to support Chiung Yao's lawsuit. She claimed that back in 2008 Yu had asked her to "borrow" Plum Blossom Scar's story for a new script, but she refused. Li Yaling further claimed that Yu had copied scenes from the Singaporean drama The Little Nyonya (2009) for Pretty Maid, an action that also damaged her reputation because she was listed as the writer. She also claimed that Yu once told her that as long as plagiarism does not exceed 20% then the courts would have no case. Another writer Zou Yue (Chinese: 邹越) also claimed to have heard the "20% rule" from Yu.

On March 12, 2015, Yangzhou Intermediate People's Court accepted a plagiarism lawsuit filed by author Zhou Haohui (Chinese: 周浩晖) against Yu and others, for allegedly plagiarizing from his novel The Evil Hypnotist (Chinese: 《邪恶催眠师》) for their 2014 TV series Cosmetology High.

On December 21, 2020, Yu and Guo Jingming were highlighted in a joint letter signed by 111 Chinese film and television industry insiders. The joint letter called for immediately stop the publicity and hype of the two who have plagiarism and bad traces, and revise and adjust the related variety shows they are currently participating in. On December 31, 2020, Yu and Guo Jingming issued their own individual apology through their respective Weibo accounts. Yu made a long-issued court-ordered apology for plagiarizing Chiung Yao's 1993 novel Plum Blossom Mark in his TV drama Palace 3: The Lost Daughter broadcast in 2014. Following his apology, Yu's appearances as a judge in the third episode of the third season of variety show I am the Actor have been removed.

== Filmography ==
=== Film ===
Year	English Title	Chinese Title	Post	Notes
		老虎肉	Screenwriter	
2013	Palace: Lock Sinensis	宫锁沉香	Screenwriter	

=== Television series ===
Year	English Title	Chinese Title	Role
2003	Carry Me Fly and Walk Off	带我飞带我走	Screenwriter
2004	Assassinator Jing Ke	荆轲传奇	Screenwriter
2005	Misty Love in the Palace	烟花三月	Screenwriter, Producer
2006		我爱河东狮	Screenwriter
2006	Concubines of the Qing Emperor	大清后宫	Screenwriter, Producer
2006	Golden Age	金色年华	Screenwriter
2007	The Legend of Chu Liuxiang	楚留香传奇	Screenwriter
2008	The Last Princess	最后的格格	Screenwriter, Producer
2008	Rouge Snow	胭脂雪	Screenwriter
2008	A Thousand Teardrops	一千滴眼泪	Screenwriter, Producer
2009	Love Tribulations	锁清秋	Screenwriter, Producer
2009	Rose Martial World	玫瑰江湖》	Screenwriter, Producer
2009	Good Wife and Mother	贤妻良母	Screenwriter
2010	Pretty Maid	大丫鬟	Screenwriter, Producer
2010	Beauty's Rival in Palace	美人心计	Screenwriter, Producer
2010	Happy Mother-in-Law, Pretty Daughter-in-Law	欢喜婆婆俏媳妇	Screenwriter, Producer
2010	Spell of the Fragrance	国色天香	Producer
2011	Palace	宫	Screenwriter, Producer
2011	Beauty World	唐宫美人天下	Screenwriter, Producer
2011	Hidden Intention	被遗弃的秘密	Producer
2012	Palace II	宫锁珠帘	Screenwriter, Producer
2012	Bounty Hunter	赏金猎人	Producer
2012	Allure Snow	倾城雪	Producer
2012	Beauties of the Emperor	王的女人	Screenwriter, Producer
2012	In Love with Power	山河恋·美人无泪	Screenwriter, Producer
2013	Swordsman	笑傲江湖	Screenwriter, Producer
2013	Legend of Lu Zhen	陆贞传奇	Producer
2013	Old Days in Shanghai	像火花像蝴蝶	Producer
2014	Palace III: The Lost Daughter	宫锁连城	Screenwriter, Producer
2014	Cosmetology High	美人製造	Screenwriter, Producer
2014	The Romance of the Condor Heroes	神雕侠侣	Screenwriter, Producer
2015	Love Yunge from the Desert	大汉情缘之云中歌	Producer
2015	Legend of Ban Shu	班淑传奇	Producer
2017	Above the Clouds	雲巔之上	Producer
2018	Untouchable Lovers	鳳囚凰	Screenwriter, Producer, Cast
2018	Story of Yanxi Palace	延禧攻略	Producer
2019	The Legend of Haolan	皓镧传	Producer
2019	Arsenal Military Academy	烈火军校	Producer
2020	Winter Begonia	鬓边不是海棠红	Producer
2020	Consummation	拾光的秘密	Producer
2021	Ode to Daughter of Great Tang	大唐女儿行	Producer, Visual director
2021	Marvelous Women	当家主母	Producer
2022	The Heritage	传家	Screenwriter, Producer
2022	Royal Feast	尚食	Producer
2022	Delicacies Destiny	珍馐记	Screenwriter, Producer
2023	Hi Producer	正好遇见你	Producer
2023	Gone with the Rain	微雨燕双飞	Producer
2023	Scent of Time	为有暗香来	Producer
2025	Perfect Match	五福临门	Producer

=== Web series ===
Year	English Title	Chinese Title	Role
2013	Crazy for Palace	我为宫狂	Screenwriter, Producer
2014	Crazy for Palace 2	我为宫狂2	Screenwriter, Producer
2015	The Backlight of Love	逆光之恋	Producer
2016	Demon Girl	半妖倾城	Producer
2016	Memory Lost	美人為餡	Producer
2016	Demon Girl 2	半妖倾城2	Producer
2017	King is not Easy	大王不容易	Producer
2021	Couple of Mirrors	双镜	Producer
2021	Palace: Devious Women	一纸寄风月	Producer

== Awards ==
Year	Work	Award	Category	Result	Notes
2008	The Last Princess	Annual Golden TVS Award	Best Screenwriter	Won	
2009		Shanghai Modern Award	Screenwriter Award	Won	
2011	Palace	Grand Ceremony of Movie & TV New Forces	Most Popular Screenwriter	Won	
2011	Palace	16th Asian Television Awards	Best Screenwriter	Won	
2011	Palace	Youku Film and Television Award	Screenwriter Award	Won	
2012	Palace II	2012 Qiyi Festival	TV Producer of the Year	Won	
2014	Swordsman	Chinese American Film Festival	Best Screenwriter	Won	
2019	—N/a	China Entertainment Industry Summit (Golden Pufferfish Awards)	Celebrity Producer of the Year	Nominated	
