= Imperial Noble Consort Dunsu =

Imperial consort of the Yongzheng Emperor

- Born: After 1679
- Died: 23 December 1725 (雍正三年 十一月 二十三日); Forbidden City, Beijing, Qing China
- Burial: Tai Mausoleum, Western Qing tombs
- Spouse: Yongzheng Emperor (m. 1711)
- Issue: Unnamed daughter; Fuyi (福宜); Fuhui (福惠); Fupei (福沛)
Posthumous name
- Imperial Noble Consort Dunsu (敦肅皇貴妃)
- House: Nian (年氏; by birth); Aisin Gioro (by marriage)
- Father: Nian Xialing (年遐齡)

Imperial Noble Consort Dunsu
- Traditional Chinese: 敦肅皇貴妃
- Simplified Chinese: 敦肃皇贵妃
Transcriptions
Standard Mandarin
- Hanyu Pinyin: Dūnsù Huángguìfēi

Imperial Noble Consort Dunsu (after 1679 – 23 December 1725), of the Han Bordered Yellow Banner Nian clan, was a consort of the Yongzheng Emperor of China's Qing dynasty.

== Life ==
=== Family background ===
- Father: Nian Xialing (年遐齡), served as the governor (巡撫) of Huguang, and held the title of a first class duke (一等公)
- Five elder brothers
  - Fifth elder brother: Nian Gengyao (年羹尧; 1679–1726)
- One sister

=== Kangxi era ===
The date of birth of the future Imperial Noble Consort Dunsu and her personal name are unknown. She entered the Forbidden City in 1711, and became a secondary consort (側福晉) to Yinzhen, the future Yongzheng Emperor. On 15 April 1715, she gave birth to her first child, a daughter, who died at the age of two in June or July 1717. On 30 June 1720, she gave birth to her second child, a son, Fuyi (福宜), who died on 9 February 1721. On 27 November 1721, she gave birth to her third child, another son, Fuhui (福惠), who died on 11 October 1728.

=== Yongzheng era ===
The Kangxi Emperor died, and Yinzhen ascended to the throne on 27 December 1722. On 28 March 1723, she was given the rank of "Noble Consort" (貴妃). On 12 June 1723, she gave birth to her fourth child and third son, Fupei (福沛). On 19 December 1725, she was elevated to "Imperial Noble Consort" (皇貴妃). She died on 27 December 1725, and was given the posthumous title of "Imperial Noble Consort Dunsu" (敦肅皇貴妃). She was interred in the Tai Mausoleum of the Western Qing tombs.

== Titles ==
- During the reign of the Kangxi Emperor (r. 1661–1722):
  - Lady Nian (年氏)
  - Secondary Consort (侧福晋; from 1711)
- During the reign of the Yongzheng Emperor (r. 1722–1735):
  - Noble Consort (貴妃; from 28 March 1723), third rank imperial consort
  - Imperial Noble Consort (皇貴妃; from 19 December 1725), second rank imperial consort
  - Imperial Noble Consort Dunsu (敦肅皇貴妃; from December 1725)

== Issue ==
- As Secondary Consort:
  - Unnamed daughter (15 April 1715 – June/July 1717), the Yongzheng Emperor's fourth daughter
  - Fuyi (福宜; 30 June 1720 – 9 February 1721), the Yongzheng Emperor's seventh son
  - Fuhui (福惠), Prince Huai of the First Rank (懷親王; 27 November 1721 – 11 October 1728), the Yongzheng Emperor's eighth son
- As Noble Consort:
  - Fupei (福沛; 12 June 1723 – ?), the Yongzheng Emperor's ninth son

== In popular culture ==
- Portrayed by Pao Cheng-Fang in Legend of YungChing (1997)
- Portrayed by Chang Lin in Yongzheng Dynasty (1999)
- Portrayed by Tong Liya in Palace (2011)
- Portrayed by Lu Meifang in Scarlet Heart (2011)
- Portrayed by Jiang Xin in Empresses in the Palace (2011)
- Portrayed by Nancy Wu in Gilded Chopsticks (2014)
- Portrayed by Li Shaminzi in Love in the Imperial Palace (2017)

== See also ==
- Royal and noble ranks of the Qing dynasty
- Imperial Chinese harem system#Qing
