= Beauty World (TV series) =

- Poster
- Also known as: Tang Gong Meiren Tianxia; Meiren Tianxia
- Chinese: 唐宫美人天下
- Hanyu Pinyin: Táng Gōng Měi Rén Tiān Xià
- Genre: Fantasy, supernatural, costume drama, romance
- Screenplay by: Yu Zheng
- Directed by: Lee Wai-chu; Huang Bin; Shen Jiarong
- Presented by: Zhang Suzhou; Zhou Li; Wang Maoliang; Li Shuqing; Mo Ren; Cao Zhe; Yu Zheng
- Starring: Zhang Ting; Ming Dow; Li Xiaolu; Mickey He; Zheng Guolin; Yang Mi; Tong Liya
- Opening theme: Luo Hua (落花) performed by Li Xiaolu
- Ending theme: Tang Ge (唐歌) performed by Mickey He
- Composer: Li Ge
- Country of origin: China
- Original language: Mandarin
- No. of episodes: 45

Production
- Executive producers: Yuan Xiaoping; Zhang Zheng; Li Ziyu; Li Yuanfen; Lin Guohua
- Producers: Yu Zheng; Zhao Hongmei; Jing Zhigang; Chen Zhirong; Chen Juncong
- Production location: China
- Cinematography: Chen Yuzhou; Ye Yunyuan; Huang Zhuangqiu; Xu Haoxian; Dong Yong
- Editor: Zheng Weiming
- Running time: 45 minutes per episode
- Production companies: Beijing Zijun Entertainment Media; Yu Zheng Workshop

Original release
- Network: Guangzhou Zonghe Channel
- Release: 21 October 2011

Related
- Beauty's Rival in Palace (2010); In Love With Power (2012)

Beauty World, also known as Tang Gong Meiren Tianxia and World of a Beauty, is a Chinese fantasy-supernatural television series set in the Tang dynasty. It was directed by Lee Wai-chu, produced and written by Yu Zheng, and starred Zhang Ting, Ming Dow, Li Xiaolu, Mickey He, Zheng Guolin, Yang Mi and Tong Liya in the leading roles. The series is regarded as a counterpart to Beauty's Rival in Palace, a similar 2010 television series set in the Han Dynasty. It was first aired on 21 October 2011 on Guangzhou Zonghe Channel in mainland China.

== Plot ==
There is mystery during the reign of Emperor Gaozong of Tang. Empress Wang is accused of murdering the infant Princess Andingsi, the daughter of the Emperor and Wu Meiniang. There are also several rare incidents in the imperial palace. Helan Xin'er, a detective, and Ming Chongyan, Empress Wang's former lover, decide to investigate the mysteries.

By chance, Helan Xin'er arrives in a brothel. She meets the owner, who reveals herself to be the mother of the Emperor. The brother owner was once Empress Zhangsun's best friend and fell in love with Emperor Taizong of Tang. Empress Zhangsun betrayed her so the brothel owner switched their children at birth. Then who and where is Empress Zhangsun's child?

Another mystery is a lady named Qingluan. She is supposedly a white fox that saved the Emperor several years ago. The Emperor favors her, but Wu Meiniang is actually suspicious. The detectives later find out that she was a spy and the perpetrator of Princess Andingsi's murder is actually the Emperor, who wanted to get rid of Zhangsun Wuji.

== Cast ==
- Zhang Ting as Wu Meiniang
- Ming Dow as Ming Chongyan / Ming Yi
- Li Xiaolu as Helan Xin'er
- Mickey He as Pei Shaoqing
- Zheng Guolin as Li Zhi
- Yang Mi as Qingluan
- Tong Liya as Wu Qingcheng
- Zhou Muyin as Wang Nijun (based on Empress Wang)
- Chang Chen-kuang as Zhangsun Wuji
- Lü Jiarong as Yu Qilin
- Wang Likun as Baihe
- Cao Xiwen as Xiao Wanwan (based on Consort Xiao)
- Zhang Meng as Xuanyu
- Guo Zhenni as Zhangsun Wugou (based on Empress Zhangsun)
- He Saifei as Lin Xueyi
- Liu Fang as Hongxiu
- Catherine Hung as Miao Fengniang
- Xiong Naijin as Liruo
- Cheng Yi as Feng Xiaobao (Xue Huaiyi)
- Deng Sha as Zhangsun Pingting
- Gao Yang as Ying Caidie
- Gao Hao as Shangguan Hao
- Miao Luoyi as Caiyu
- Huang Haibing as Li Shimin
- He Yanni as Shangguan Yun'er
- Li Sha as Yang Nüshi
- Ye Simiao as Jin Qiaoyu
- Liu Jiayuan as Yuenu
- Chi Lijing as Fang Lingsu
- Yang Shengwen as Beauty Wang
- Dong Hui as Yuan Chunyu
- Bai Shan as Lu Mingzhu
- Han Zixuan as Li Hong
- Chen Hani as Ai Jinlian
- Luo Jin as Ji Dapeng
- Ma Wenlong as Yuanxiu
- Wei Wei as Ma Rengui
- Deng Xibin as Khan of Western Turks
- He Xianda as Luo Binwang
- Ren Xuehai as Wang Nijun's father
- Jiang Yiyi as Xiaoxin'er
- Su Qing as Wang Yuqian
- Xu Qifeng as Shen Daguo

== Broadcasts ==
Region	Network	Dates	Timings
China	Guangzhou Zonghe Channel	21 October 2011	19:15 (daily)
China	Shandong Film and TV Series Channel	23 October 2011	18:48 (daily)
China	Huizhou TV Channel 2	2 November 2011	
China	Jiangsu Satellite TV	24 November 2011	19:30 (daily)
China	Shenzhen Satellite TV	24 November 2011	19:30 (daily)
China	Anhui Satellite TV	24 November 2011	19:31 (daily)
China	Yunnan Satellite TV	24 November 2011	19:34 (daily)
Singapore	mio TV	31 December 2011; 10 March 2012	16:15 (Saturdays); 19:45 (Saturdays)
Hong Kong	i-CABLE Entertainment Channel	12 March 2012	22:30 (daily)
Thailand	MONO29	13 March 2015 – 21 May 2015	19:00-20:00 (Tuesdays-Fridays)
