= Jiang Yiyi =

Chinese actress

- Born: January 1, 2001 (age 25); Beijing, China
- Other names: Angelina, Olivia
- Occupation: Actress
- Years active: 2007–present

Chinese name
- Simplified Chinese: 蒋依依
Transcriptions

Jiang Yiyi (Chinese: 蒋依依, born 1 January 2001) is a Chinese actress.

== Career ==
Jiang is a child actress who is known for portraying the younger counterparts of many notable characters in television and films. She made her first acting appearance in the 2007 drama Beautiful Life, and first became known for her role as young Nie Shen'er in the historical romance drama Beauty's Rival in Palace (2010). Some of her well-known appearances include wuxia drama Swordsman as young Ren Yingying, historical drama Prince of Lan Ling as young Yang Xuewu, and wuxia romance drama The Romance of the Condor Heroes as young Guo Fu.

In 2015, Jiang played a Korean transfer taekwondo student in the hit youth sports drama The Whirlwind Girl and its sequel, Tornado Girl. The same year, she starred in the historical drama Legend of Ban Shu as one of the students.

In 2017, Jiang played her first lead role in the science fiction suspense drama Die Now.

In 2018, Jiang co-starred in the period adventure drama Eagles and Youngsters.

In 2020, Jiang gained attention for her guest appearance in the xianxia romance drama Love of Thousand Years. The same year, she played the leading role of Nezha in the shenmo drama Heroic Journey of Nezha.

== Filmography ==
=== Film ===
Year	English title	Chinese title	Role	Notes
2007	Xiao Yu	小雨	Xiao Yu	
2008	An Empress and the Warriors	江山美人	young Yan Fei'er	
2009		衡水湖的孩子们	Jiang Lei	
2009	Mars Baby	火星宝贝之火星没事	Keke	
2010		亡命琴师	Xiao Xiao	
2010		情回鹭岛	young Liu Nian	
2011	Love on Credit	幸福额度	young Mo Xiaoqing	
2011	Love You You	夏日乐悠悠	young Xia Mi	
2013	Better and Better	越来越好之村晚		
2013	One Night Surprise	一夜惊喜	young Mi Xue	
2013	The Palace	宫锁沉香	young Liu Li	
2014	Once Upon a Time in Shanghai	恶战	Xiao Hua	

=== Television series ===
Year	English title	Chinese title	Role	Network	Notes
2007	Beautiful Life	笑著活下去	young Yanyang	Shanghai Channel	
2007	Can't Forget	忘不了	Zhang Xiaomao	Tianjin TV	
2007	Fleeing by Night	夜奔	young Xia Tianchi		
2008	The Queens	母仪天下	young Fuyao	CCTV	
2008	Dear Enemy	亲爱的敌人	young Mu Tong		
2008	Father's Promise	父亲的诺言	Fei Fei		
2009	Four Generations Under One Roof	四世同堂	Xiao Niuzi	CCTV	
2009	Big Life	大生活	Xiao Yu'er	Shenchuan TV	
2009	The Heaven Sword and Dragon Saber	倚天屠龙记	young Yin Li	Wenzhou TV	
2009	Good Wife and Mother	贤妻良母	young Xin Yue	Hebei TV	
2009	Remembrance of Dreams Past	故梦	young Lu Haitang	Beijing TV	
2010	Tea House	茶馆	Wang Xiaohua	CCTV	
2010	Beauty's Rival in Palace	美人心计	young Nie Shen'er / Wang Zhi	Shanghai TV	
2010	The Firmament of the Pleiades	苍穹之昴	young Ling'er	Beijing TV	
2011	I Once Had a Dream with You	曾经与你有个梦	Xiao Feng		
2011	Ju Zi	菊子	young Ye Zi	Shandong Channel	
2011	We Are a Family	我们是一家人	Qiu Qiu	Tianjin Channel	
2011	Romance On The Left, Marriage On The Right	浪漫向左，婚姻往右	Xiao Yu	Shanghai Channel	
2011	Beauty World	唐宫美人天下	young Helan Xin'er	Shandong TV	
2011	The Emperor's Harem	后宫	young Shao Chunhua / Li Ziyun	Zhejiang TV	
2011	Hidden Intention	被遗弃的秘密	young Liu Liu	Hunan TV	
2012	The Loop	我叫王土地	young Wang Guiying	CCTV	
2012	Adopted Daughter	养女	young Mei Zi	CCTV	
2012	The City of Fog	雾都	Zi Gui	Jiangsu TV	
2012	Fragrant Years	那样芬芳	young Rong Fenfang	Dragon TV	
2012	Magic Blade	天涯明月刀	young Cui Nong / Ming Yuexin	Hunan TV	
2012	Beauties of the Emperor	王的女人	young Lu Zhi	Zhejiang TV	
2013	Swordsman	笑傲江湖	young Ren Yingying	Hunan TV	
2013	Luan Shi Hao Qing	乱世豪情	young Shen Haiping	Jiangsu Channel	
2013	The Victor	怒海情仇	young Tang Ruyin	Jiangsu Channel	
2013	Prince of Lan Ling	兰陵王	young Yang Xuewu	CTV	
2014	Man Matchmaker	男媒婆	Zhou Bingbing	Beijing TV	
2014	Lanterns	花灯满城	Yi Yun	Hunan TV	
2014	The Romance of the Condor Heroes	神雕侠侣	young Guo Fu	Hunan TV	
2015	The Whirlwind Girl	旋风少女	Kim Min-joo	Hunan TV	
2015	Love Yunge from the Desert	大汉情缘之云中歌	young Yun Ge	Hunan TV	
2015	Legend of Ban Shu	班淑传奇	Jiang Ling	Tencent	
2015	The Legendary Innkeeper	传奇大掌柜	young Yao Zhenzhen	CCTV	
2015	Once Upon a Time in Tsingtao	青岛往事	young Xiao Man	CCTV	
2015	Legend of Heroes	正义联盟	Guo Guo		
2015	Young Marshal	少帅	young Yu Fengzhi	Beijing TV, Dragon TV	
2016	Nine Years	九年	Xiang Cai		
2016	My Uncle Zhou Enlai	海棠依旧	Zhong Changyuan	CCTV	
2016	Tornado Girl	旋风少女2	Kim Min-joo	Hunan TV	
2016	Zhaoge	朝歌	Ling'er	iQiyi	Unreleased
2017	Tracks in the Snowy Forest	林海雪原	young Chang Bao	Anhui TV	
2017	Princess Agents	楚乔传	Curly Head	Hunan TV	Cameo, episode 1
2017	Die Now	端脑	Qing Zhi	Sohu TV	
2017	Trouble Killer	谜·途	Bei Lele		
2018	Eagles and Youngsters	天坑鹰猎	Xiao Hongguo	Youku	
2019	Over the Sea I Come to You	带着爸爸去留学	Wu Dandan	Dragon TV, Zhejiang TV	
2020	Love of Thousand Years	三千鸦杀	Di Ji	Mango TV, Youku	Guest appearance
2020	Heroic Journey of Nezha	哪咤降妖记	Nezha	Hunan TV	
2020	Hikaru No Go	棋魂		iQiyi	
2021	My Heroic Husband	赘婿	Liu Da Biao (Xi Gua)	Tencent	
2021	Crossroad Bistro	北辙南辕	PéngMàn	iQiyi	
2023	You Are My Eternal Star	你是我的永恒星辰	Lin Xiaodi	Youku	
2023	The Legends of Monkey King	大泼猴	Que'er / Jin Si Que		

== Discography ==
Year	English title	Chinese title	Album	Notes
2010	Green Lotus	青莲	Beauty's Rival in Palace OST	
