= Tien Niu =

Taiwanese actress

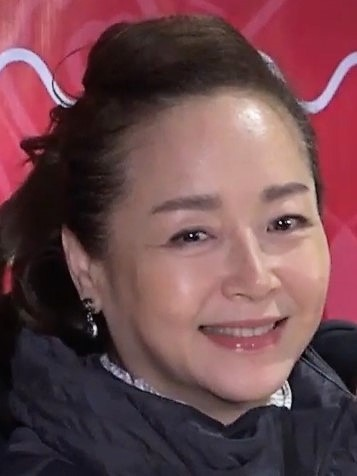
Tien Niu in 2018

Tien Niu (Chinese: 恬妞; born 23 January 1958) is a Taiwanese actress.

Tien's birth name is Chu Kai-li. She won the Golden Horse Award for Best Leading Actress at the 15th Golden Horse Awards in 1978, and was shortlisted for the same prize during the 19th Golden Horse Awards in 1982. In 1980, she served as a Golden Horse Award presenter, then co-hosted the awards alongside Sun Yueh in 1983. Tien has been married twice, to Indonesian business magnate Ye Conghao from 1984 to 1986, and to Alex Man between 1992 and 1996.

== Selected filmography ==
- Thirteen (1974)
- The Unforgettable Character (1975)
- Victory (1976)
- The Brave Archer (1977)
- City War (1988)
- Just Heroes (1989)
- Little Cop (1989)
- The Magnificent Scoundrels (1991)
- Young Hero Fong Sai Yuk (1999)
- Para Para Sakura (2001)
- The Legendary Siblings 2 (2002)
- Eternity: A Chinese Ghost Story (2003)
- The Dragon Heroes (2005)
- Fatal Move (2008)
- Empire of Silver (2009)
- The Jade and the Pearl (2010)
- Love Lifting (2012)
- Palace II (2012)
- Romancing in Thin Air (2012)
- Legend of Lu Zhen (2013)
- Love at Second Sight (2014)
- Legend of Ban Shu (2015)
- Midnight Diner (2017)
- Oh My General (2017)
- Song of Phoenix (2017)
- Sweet Combat (2018)
- Soul Snatcher (2020)
- Where the Mask Ends (2026) as Lady Shao'an, Wei Rao's maternal grandmother
