= Happy Mother-in-Law, Pretty Daughter-in-Law =

2010 Chinese television series

- Official poster
- Also known as: 八星報喜賜良緣 (in Hong Kong)
- Genre: Costume drama Comedy drama
- Created by: Yu Zheng
- Directed by: Yeung Chi-kin; Zhou Jiawen
- Starring: Kingdom Yuen; Shirley Dai; Mickey He; Hawick Lau; Myolie Wu; Gao Hao; Yang Rong
- Opening theme: "Huan Xi Ge" (欢喜歌) by Mickey He & Myolie Wu
- Ending theme: "Li Hai Liao" (厉害了) by Mickey He
- Country of origin: China
- Original language: Mandarin
- No. of episodes: 33

Production
- Producers: Yu Zheng; Moren; Cao Zhe
- Production location: Shanghai
- Camera setup: Multi camera
- Running time: 40 minutes (per episode)
- Production companies: Yu Zheng Workshop; Zijun Brilliance

Original release
- Network: Shenzhen TV
- Release: October 10 – October 20, 2010

Happy Mother-in-Law, Pretty Daughter-in-Law
- Traditional Chinese: 歡喜婆婆俏媳婦
- Simplified Chinese: 欢喜婆婆俏媳妇
- Literal meaning: Happy Mother-in-Law, Pretty Daughter-in-Law
Transcriptions
Standard Mandarin
- Hanyu Pinyin: Huān Xǐ Pópo Qiǎo Xífù
Yue: Cantonese
- Jyutping: Fun1 Hei2 Po4 Po4 Ciu3 Sik1 Fu5

Huan Xi Popo Qiao Xifu, also known by its literal English title Happy Mother-in-Law, Pretty Daughter-in-Law, is a Chinese television comedy-drama serial created by Yu Zheng. The drama is a produced by Yu Zheng Workshop and Zijun Brilliance, directed by Yeung Chi-kin and Zhou Jiawen, and features cast members from both Mainland China and Hong Kong. The drama originally broadcast in 33 episodes (though 35 episodes were produced) on Shenzhen TV from October 10 to 20, 2010, airing three consecutive episodes a night. Taiwan's China Television (CTV) aired the drama one episode per night, starting from December 8, 2010. Southern China's Guangdong Television debuted the drama on January 26, 2011, airing in double episodes per night. Shanxi Television debuted the drama on January 29, 2011, and the drama began airing on Jiangsu Television (JSTV) starting February 3, 2011. Hong Kong's i-Cable Entertainment Channel aired the Cantonese dubbed version starting January 31, 2011, renaming the title to 8 Stars (八星報喜賜良緣) due to its Lunar New Year time slot.

The story takes place in an unnamed Chinese city during the early 1900s, a few years after the establishment of the Republic of China. Ma Linglong (Kingdom Yuen), an ex-princess of the fallen Qing Dynasty, is forced to take up a matchmaking profession to raise her three sons (Hawick Lau, Mickey He, Gao Hao) after her husband left her for another woman. As her three sons grow older, she prepares to find wives with them through matchmaking, but none of them worked through.

== Plot ==
Ma Linglong, a professional matchmaker and an ex-princess of the fallen Qing Dynasty, is choosy when picking wives for her three sons. She wants her first son, Changsheng, to marry an intelligent and hardworking wife, but he falls in love with the money-lover Manguan. Linglong's second son, Changhuan, is bright and witty, and she has hopes for him to marry an elegant and clever wife, but Changhuan is attracted to the naïve ex-convict Jinyu. The youngest son, Changjun, is educated in the west. Linglong hopes Changjun's educated background will bring honor to the family, but Changjun wants to marry the family's matchmaking apprentice Bajie, who is three years his senior. Although her three daughters-in-law are not what she expected, she nonetheless tries her best to correct their flaws, winning the respect of her children.

== Characters ==
- Kingdom Yuen (voice by Doris Wang) as Ma Linglong
- Myolie Wu (voice by Su Boli) as Qian Manguan
- Shirley Dai (voice by Gui Guanlin) as Tong Jinyu
- Hawick Lau (voice by Jiang Guangtao) as Tie Changsheng
- Mickey He (voice by Chen Hao) as Tie Changhuan
- Yang Rong (voice by Zhang Kai) as Zhu Bajie
- Gao Hao (voice by Zhang Jie) as Tie Changjun
- Li Sha as Yumi
- Cheung Tat-ming as Qian Yingjun
- Li Qingqing as Jia Miaotiao
- Nie Xin as Teng Xiulian
- Chen Xiao as Guo Xiaotian
- Mei Lina as Hong
- Liu Jiayuan as Bai
- Tang Jing as Lan
- Tong Liya (voice by Ma Haiyan) as Xilan
- Richard Ng (voice by Han Tongsheng) as Tie Mu'er
