= Yang Rong (actress) =

Chinese actress of Bai origin (born 1981)

- 杨蓉
- Born: June 3, 1981 (age 45); Baoshan, Yunnan, China
- Education: Shanghai Theatre Academy
- Occupation: Actress
- Years active: 1997–present
- Agent: Huanyu Film

Chinese name
- Traditional Chinese: 楊蓉
- Simplified Chinese: 杨蓉
Transcriptions
Standard Mandarin
- Hanyu Pinyin: Yáng Róng

Yang Rong (Chinese: 杨蓉, born 3 June 1981) is a Chinese actress of Bai origin. She is best known for her roles in Cosmetology High and Memory Lost.

== Early life ==
Born in Baoshan, Yunnan, on June 3, 1981, Yang Rong graduated from Shanghai Theatre Academy, where she majored in acting.

In 1992, at the age of 10, she enrolled at Yunnan Art School to study dance. Two years later, she studied acting in Shanghai Normal University Xie Jin School of film and Television Art. In 1997, by age 15, she was accepted to Shanghai Theatre Academy and graduated in 2001.

== Career ==
Yang Rong made her acting debut in Xie Jin's war epic film The Opium War, playing a servant girl. She gained attention in the early 2000s for her roles in Young Emperor (2001), The Censor of Qing Dynasty (2003) and Young Justice Bao 3 (2005). In 2007, Yang was cast as Qing Wen in the drama Dream of the Red Chamber, based on Cao Xueqin's classical novel. In 2008, she starred alongside Chen Kun and Liu Ye in romantic drama Love Ensure This Life.

Yang first worked with Yu Zheng in 2010, and appeared in her first comedy series Happy Mother-in-law, Pretty Daughter-in-law (2010). Her performance received positive reviews and the following year, Yang was signed to Yu Zheng's studio. She was then cast in Palace 2 (2012), the second installment of Yu Zheng's Gong series wherein she played an antagonist. In 2013, she played contrasting roles in two of Yu's productions; a cold and domineering concubine in historical television series Legend of Lu Zhen and an adorable and young lady in wuxia series Swordsman. Both series were popular and earned high ratings, leading to increased popularity for Yang. Known for portraying notable second leading roles, Yang impressed audiences with her performances in Palace 3: The Lost Daughter (2014), Love Yunge from the Desert (2015) and Lady & Liar (2015), at times even outshining the main leads.

After numerous secondary roles, Yang was finally cast by Yu Zheng in her first leading role, in the historical television drama Cosmetology High (2014). The series was one of the most watched dramas in China while it aired on Hunan Television, and established Yang as a leading actress in her own right. In 2016, Yang starred in crime drama Memory Lost, adapted from Ding Mo's novel. The series was a hit in China and internationally, and raised Yang's popularity. This was followed by another leading role in the well-received police drama, K9 Coming.

In 2022, she portrayed Communist Party Secretary Huang Wenxiu in the biographical television series Daughter of the Mountains.

== Filmography ==
=== Film ===
Year	English title	Chinese title	Role	Notes
1997	The Opium War	鸦片战争	A servant girl	
2000	Blade	刀锋	Zhang Yunyan	
2003	Midnight Ghosts	午夜惊魂	A Lian	
2008	The Story of a Closestool	马桶上的甜蜜生	Mu Xiaodan	
2011	The Queen	女王	Fang Xueqin	

=== Television series ===
Year	English title	Chinese title	Role	Notes
1997	Ten Thousand Mile Clear Sky	万里晴空	He Dongmei	
1998		李大本事	Xiu Er	
1998	West Street Girl	西街女	A Pian	
1999	Century Life	世纪人生	Xia Guozhang	
1999	Regretless Promise	无悔的承诺	Xu Yang	
2000	Pity the Men's Heart	可怜天下男人心	Xiao Mei	
2000	Purple File	紫色档案	Xiao Tao	
2001	Legend of Ji Gong	济公传奇	Leng Xiaofeng	
2003	Fugitive	天涯追缉令	Huo Qingmei	
2003	Young Emperor	少年天子	Tong Layue	
2004	The Censor of Qing Dynasty	大清御史	Li Juan	
2004		尘世笑谈	Wang Lili	
2004		武装特警	Juan Zi	
2005	Hero During Yongle Period	永乐英雄儿女	Ling Er	
2006	Young Justice Bao 3	少年包青天3	Xiao Fengzheng	
2008	Mountain Side Sea Side	山那边海那边	Zheng Meiying	
2008	Love Ensure This Life	情证今生	Li Yuwei	
2009	Closet Enemy	最亲的敌人	Zhang Xiaoxing	
2009	The Boy Who Painted The Sky	新鲁冰花	Lin Xuefen	
2009	Defending Yan'an	保卫延安	Miao Zhen	
2010	Behind the Gunshot	枪声背后	Cai Yu	
2011	Happy Mother-in-law, Pretty Daughter-in-law	欢喜婆婆俏媳妇	Zhu Bajie	
2011	Locking U.S. Envoy	锁定美军特使	Gu Xiaoyu	
2012	Palace 2	宫锁珠帘	Xujia Xixiang	
2012	Being Son-in-law Is Difficult	女婿难当	Ren Yingying	
2012	Lock Dream	锁梦楼	Zhou Qing	
2012	Swaying Life	飘摇人生	Xiao Yu	
2012	Beauties of the Emperor	王的女人	Yu Ruyi	
2013	Swordsman	笑傲江湖	Yue Lingshan	
2013	Our Love	爱的创可贴	Xu Ying	
2013	Legend of Lu Zhen	陆贞传奇	Xiao Huanyun	
2014	Palace 3: The Lost Daughter	宫锁连城	Tong Yuxiu	
2014	Cosmetology High	美人制造	Su Lianyi	
2014	Love Three Lives	情定三生	Gu Zhixia	
2014	The Romance of the Condor Heroes	神雕侠侣	Mei Chaofeng	
2015	Lady & Liar	千金女贼	Du Xiaohan	
2015	Love Yunge from the Desert	大汉情缘之云中歌	Huo Chengjun	
2015	War of the Dragon	新猛龙过江	Lu Yanming	
2016	My Love to Tell You	我的爱对你说	Xiang Jiujiu	
2016	Memory Lost	美人为馅	Bai Jinxi/Su Mian	
2016	The Legend of Flying Daggers	飞刀又见飞刀	Xuan Caiyue	
2018	K9 Coming	警犬来啦	He Mumian	
2018	The Great Adventurer Wesley	冒险王卫斯理	Wu Ming	Segment: "Mind Port"
2018	Ghost Catcher Zhong Kiu's Record	钟馗捉妖记	Ling Xi	
2018	The Tomb of Sea	沙海	Liang Wan	
2021	Song of Youth	玉楼春	Sun Youzhen	Guest appearance
2021	Wisher	致命愿望	Wang Meifen	
2022	Daughter of the Mountains	大山的女儿	Huang Wenxiu	
TBA	The Matriarch	当家主母	Zeng Baoqin	
TBA	Back From the Brink	护心	Su Ying	

== Awards and nominations ==
Year	Award	Category	Nominated work	Result	Ref.
2017	2nd Asia New Media Film Festival	Most Popular Actress (Web series)	Memory Lost	Won	
2024	34th Flying Apsaras Awards	Outstanding Actress	Daughter of the Mountains	Nominated	
