= Swordsman (TV series) =

2013 Chinese TV series

- Promotional poster
- 笑傲江湖
- Genre: Wuxia
- Based on: The Smiling, Proud Wanderer by Jin Yong
- Screenplay by: Yu Zheng
- Directed by: Hu Yijuan; Huang Junwen
- Creative director: Li Xianchang
- Presented by: Pu Shulin; Ren Quan; Yu Zheng; Wan Ke; Zheng Gang
- Starring: Wallace Huo; Joe Chen; Yuan Shanshan; Chen Xiao; Yang Rong
- Theme music composer: Tan Xuan; Dong Zhen
- Opening theme: "Freedom" by Wallace Huo
- Ending theme: "Love Me" by Pu Ti and Yuan Shanshan
- Composer: Liu Sha
- Country of origin: China
- Original language: Mandarin
- No. of episodes: 42

Production
- Executive producers: Lin Guohua; Kong Lingquan; Yang Yuming; Ren Xiaoli; Yu Wanqin; Guo Yan; Shen Wei; Yang Le
- Producer: Yu Zheng
- Production location: China
- Cinematography: Li Hongzhou; Ye Yunyuan; Chen Guowen; Dong Yong; Ma Lianyin
- Editor: Zheng Weiming
- Running time: ≈45 minutes per episode
- Production companies: Cathay Media; Ren Quan Workshop; Perfect World (Beijing) Pictures; Hunan Satellite TV; Yu Zheng Workshop; Dongyang Xingrui Yingshi Culture Media

Original release
- Network: Hunan Satellite TV
- Release: 6 February – 4 March 2013

Swordsman (笑傲江湖) is a 2013 Chinese wuxia television series adapted from the novel The Smiling, Proud Wanderer by Jin Yong. The series was written and produced by Yu Zheng, and starred Wallace Huo, Joe Chen, Yuan Shanshan, Chen Xiao and Yang Rong. Shooting started on 24 March 2012 in Xiandu, Jinyun County, Zhejiang. It was first aired in China on Hunan Television from 6 February to 4 March 2013. The plot deviates significantly from the novel, with Dongfang Bubai depicted as a woman (instead of a castrated man) and having a romantic affair with Linghu Chong.

== Synopsis ==
Linghu Chong, a swordsman of the Mount Hua School, is open-minded and unrestrained by nature. At the start, his swordsmanship was ordinary. Later, he met Feng Qingyang, a swordmaster who taught him the "Nine Swords of Dugu", and learnt the essence of the swordsmanship of the Five Mountain Sword Schools Alliance. This aroused the suspicion of his master Yue Buqun, who expelled him from the Mount Hua School. Yue Buqun appears to be a morally upright swordsman, but he is secretly a scheming hypocrite. In order to obtain the highly coveted Sunflower Manual, he designed a plan to make the martial arts schools turn against each other, but in the end, he killed himself. Linghu Chong had been in love with Yue Buqun's daughter Yue Lingshan since childhood, but she eventually married Lin Pingzhi. Later, Linghu Chong met Ren Yingying, the daughter of the Sun Moon Holy Cult's leader Ren Woxing, and the two had similar interests. After several life and death misunderstandings, they realised that they loved each other deeply, but Ren Yingying had been poisoned and was dying. After experiencing the hegemony disputes in the jianghu, Linghu Chong and Ren Yingying finally appreciated each other and got married.

== Cast ==
- Wallace Huo as Linghu Chong / Yang Lianting
- Joe Chen as Dongfang Bubai
- Yuan Shanshan as Ren Yingying / Xuexin
  - Jiang Yiyi as Ren Yingying (younger)
- Chen Xiao as Lin Pingzhi / Duyuan (Lin Yuantu)
- Yang Rong as Yue Lingshan
- Howie Huang as Yue Buqun
  - Wu Junyu as Yue Buqun (younger)
- Yang Mingna as Ning Zhongze
- Heizi as Ren Woxing
- Deng Sha as Yilin
- Bryan Leung as Feng Qingyang
- Zhang Zhuowen as Lu Dayou
- Cheng Cheng as Lao Denuo
- Bao Wenjing as Yiyu
- Han Dong as Tian Boguang
- Sun Binhao as Xiang Wentian
- Lü Jiarong as Lan Fenghuang
- Xie Ning as Laotouzi
- Shen Baoping as Zu Qianqiu
- Zhang Tianyang as Ji Wushi
- Ye Qishan as Sima Da
- Marco Li as Yu Canghai
- Zhang Hengping as Fangzheng
- He Jiayi as Dingyi
- Hu Dong as Zuo Lengshan
- Li Ruichao as Yu Renhao
- Wang Renjun as Ping Yizhi
- Zhang Tianqi as Jia Renda
- Guo Dongdong as Gu Tong
- Wang Shuang as Bai Ying
- Zhang Jixuan as Heixiong
- Guan Xin as Baixiong
- Bai Hailong as Fangsheng
- Wei Ziqian as Shangguan Yun
- Wang Zheng as Lu Bai
- Shao Min as Dingjing
- Zhang Chunzhong as Mu Gaofeng
- He Xin as Luo Renjie
- Zhang Haoxiang as Mo Da
- Chang Sheng as Tianmen
- Zhou Shaodong as Wang Yuanba
- Zhao Junlong as Wang Bofen
- Guo Wei as Ding Mian
- Mo Meilin as Tong Baixiong
- Wang Kai as Feng Buping
- Liao Xi as Cheng Buyou
- Zhu Rongrong as Mi Weiyi
- Cao Nan as Fei Bin
- Gu Dechao as Adviser Yi
- Yin Jian as Ding Jian
- Zhang Keyan as Jia Bu
- Xiaoshuai as Liu Jin
- Tong Tong as Mute Granny
- Wang Zelin as Heibao
- Chai Ge as Zheng
- Zhang Lei as Shi
- Yang Yaotian as Yuqingzi
- Guo Qiang as Yujizi
- Wei Qianxiang as Sun Jiantong
- Miao Luoyi as the princess consort
- Zhang Xueying as Lao Busi
- Liu Shuo as Qinghai Yixiao
- Pan Haichen as Hongye
- Gong Sile as Yue Su
- Shi Tianshuo as Cai Zifeng
- Zhuo Fan as Yilin's father
- Li Li as Yilin's mother
- Ju Lai as Lodge Master Qi
- Feng Jujing as Lodge Master Yi
- Kang Jie as a swordsman
- Wang Gang as Yue Buqun's master
- Yin Baoying as a beauty
- Dicky Cheung as Lüzhuweng
- Zhang Qian as Huahua
- Qian Yongchen as Yu Renyan
- Hai Lu as Yuniang
- Huang Haibing as Dugu Qiubai
- Zhou Muyin as Liu Zhengfeng's wife
- Ren Quan as Danqingsheng
- Bao Bei'er as Tubiweng
- Wang Jianxin as Huang Zhonggong
- Zhao Liang as Heibaizi
- Kou Zhenhai as Lin Zhennan
- Bai Shan as Lin Zhennan's wife
- Huo Zhengyan as Liu Zhengfeng
- Zong Fengyan as Qu Yang

== Renaming of Shaolin Monastery to Lingjiu Monastery ==
In the series, Shaolin Monastery (or Shaolin School) is renamed Lingjiu Monastery ('Divine Eagle Monastery' (靈鷲寺)). The change is believed to be because the producers wanted to avoid trademark infringement, since Shaolin Monastery has officially registered "Shaolin" as a trademark and has been involved in lawsuits with commercial companies over the use of "Shaolin" as a brand name or trademark.

== Soundtrack ==
No.	Title	Music	Length
1.	"Freedom (逍遥)" (Opening theme song)	Wallace Huo	4:25
2.	"Love Me (爱我)" (Ending theme song)	Yuan Shanshan and Pu Ti	3:47
3.	"Awakened (觉悟)"	Yuan Shanshan	4:34
4.	"Wind Up (了结)"	Dong Zhen	5:12

== Reception ==
Prior to its original broadcast, Swordsman received popular attention for its teen idol cast in comparison with older adaptations of The Smiling, Proud Wanderer, and for major amendments made to the original story. Particular attention was shed on Joe Chen's casting as Dongfang Bubai, a minor antagonist in the novel whose role was substantially rewritten in this series to portray him/her as one of two female protagonists alongside Yuan Shanshan's character, Ren Yingying.

During and following its broadcast, the series received mixed and largely polarised reviews. The series was both praised and criticised for its unfaithfulness to the novel, although producer Yu Zheng asserted that it is one of the 'most faithful' adaptations of The Smiling, Proud Wanderer. Nevertheless, the series maintained high ratings throughout its run. The new characterisation of Dongfang Bubai sparked controversy, even though Joe Chen's performance as a complex character was praised, and Dongfang Bubai became a feminist pop icon. Chen Xiao's portrayal of Lin Pingzhi was also critically acclaimed, but Yuan Shanshan's Ren Yingying was critically dismissed as a miscast of the original character in the novel. Attention was directed towards the prominence of romantic plotlines and subplots in the series which were similarly met with mixed reviews. However, new romantic pairings among the cast as follows were well received by younger audiences: Wallace Huo's Linghu Chong and Joe Chen's Dongfang Bubai; Han Dong's Tian Boguang and Deng Sha's Yilin; Chen Xiao's Lin Pingzhi and Yang Rong's Yue Lingshan; Lü Jiarong's Lan Fenghuang and Han Dong's Tian Boguang.

== Awards and nominations ==
Year	Award	Category	Nominated work	Result
2013	5th China TV Drama Awards	Most Popular Actress (Hong Kong/Taiwan)	Joe Chen	Won
