= Deception Obsession =

- Poster
- Simplified Chinese: 诡影迷情
- Directed by: Xiang Haiming; Ji Qiao
- Starring: Sun Feifei; Tai Li; Shang Rong; Wang Yijia; Qiuguo Chen
- Production companies: Xian Longshi Entertainment; Beijing Red Bushan Media; Zhejiang Yihe Production; Beijing 6shun Media
- Distributed by: Beijing G-POINT Film Culture Media
- Release date: November 27, 2015
- Running time: 87 minutes
- Country: China
- Language: Mandarin
- Box office: CN¥2.6 million

Deception Obsession (Chinese: 诡影迷情) is a 2015 Chinese suspense horror thriller film directed by Xiang Haiming and Ji Qiao. It was released on November 27, 2015.

== Plot ==
Xiao Ke's wife Ma Li died unexpectedly during a sea trip. After attending Ma Li's "first seven days" funeral, Xiao Ke decided to rest at home for a while to adjust his mood. However, Xiao Ke found that strange things began to happen around him one after another. Things in the house were inexplicably moved, and his wife's belongings always had traces of being turned over by others. Xiao Ke felt that there was always a pair of eyes watching him silently, and fear began to shroud Xiao Ke's heart. Slowly, he found that all the strange things happened after his wife Ma Li's "first seven days". Could it be that his wife who died that night really came back?

== Cast ==
- Sun Feifei
- Tai Li
- Shang Rong
- Wang Yijia
- Qiuguo Chen

== Reception ==
The film has earned CN¥2.6 million at the Chinese box office.
