= Legend of Lu Zhen =

- Drama poster
- Also known as: Female Prime Minister

Chinese name
- Traditional Chinese: 陸貞傳奇
- Simplified Chinese: 陆贞传奇
Transcriptions
Standard Mandarin
- Hanyu Pinyin: Lùzhēn Chuánqí
- Genre: Historical fiction Romance
- Based on: Female Prime Minister by Zhang Wei
- Written by: Zhang Wei
- Directed by: Li Huizhu; Zheng Wei'en; Liang Guoguan
- Starring: Zhao Liying; Chen Xiao; Qiao Renliang; Yang Rong; Tang Yixin; Maggie Cheung Ho-yee
- Opening theme: Cherish by Li Yuchun
- Ending theme: Mood by Zanilia Zhao and Chen Xiao
- Country of origin: China
- Original language: Mandarin
- No. of episodes: 59

Production
- Executive producers: Yu Zheng; Mu Xiaohui
- Production location: Hengdian World Studios
- Production companies: Perfect World; Hunan Broadcasting System; Yu Zheng Studio

Original release
- Network: Hunan Television
- Release: 5 May – 29 May 2013

Legend of Lu Zhen (Chinese: 陆贞传奇) is a 2013 Chinese television historical drama series based on the novel Female Prime Minister (女相) by Zhang Wei. Directed by Li Huizhu, Zheng Wei'en and Liang Guoguan and produced by Yu Zheng and Mu Xiaohui, the series stars Zhao Liying and Chen Xiao. It was first broadcast on 5 May 2013 in China and subsequently aired in other Asian countries such as South Korea and Japan.

== Synopsis ==
The story centres on the rise of Lu Zhen (Zhao Liying) from a mere lady-in-waiting to prime minister during the Northern Qi dynasty. The character of Lu Zhen is based on Lu Lingxuan, a lady-in-waiting of Northern Qi that grew very powerful.

Lu Zhen was the elder ambitious daughter of the Lu family, who successfully ran the family porcelain business, much to her father's delight and her stepmother's jealousy. Afraid of Lu Zhen taking away family assets upon her impending marriage, her stepmother Zhao Yinglan schemes to poison her father and attempts to frame Lu Zhen for the murder. When Lu Zhen is acquitted, her stepmother arranges to marry her off as a concubine to an old man so that she can seize the family assets. Lu Zhen flees and is saved by Prince Gao Zhan (Chen Xiao), who falls in love with Lu Zhen due to her resemblance to his first love Xiao Huan Yun (Yang Rong).

Gao Zhan faced the same family problem; when his father died, Empress Lou usurped his succession to the throne so that her own son and Gao Zhan's elder half-brother, Prince Yan (Qiao Renliang) could become emperor. Through Gao Zhan's connection, Lu Zhen entered the palace to become a maid, with the aim to rise to a sixth rank female official so that she could appeal to the supreme court to re-investigate her father's murder. Amidst the constant scheming between Prince Zhan and Empress Lou in the fight to claim the throne, Lu Zhen managed to gain the emperor's support and rise through the ranks with her hard work, intelligence, and luck. She then helped Prince Gao Zhan claim his rightful throne, but could not be his empress due to certain circumstances. Gao Zhan instead conferred her the title of prime minister upon his ascension, which is the highest position in the court so that she could best exercise her talent and aid him in ruling the country.

== Cast ==
=== Main ===
- Zhao Liying as Lu Zhen
  - Eldest mistress of the Lu family → Palace Maid in training → Third Class Attendant of the Palace of Isolation (靜心院) → Second Class Attendant of the Palace of Isolation → First Class Attendant of the Palace of Isolation → Eighth Rank Lady official (八品掌珍) at Department of treasures, Si Bao Si (司寶司). → Eighth Rank Lady official at Department of Clothing, Si Yi Si (司衣司). → Seventh Rank Lady official → Eighth Rank Lady official → Seventh Rank Lady official → Sixth Rank Lady official (六品司衣) → Fifth Rank Shanggong (五品尚宮) in charge of Departments of Accounting, Clothing and Treasure → Third Rank Zhaoyi (三品昭儀), Court Minister, in charge of the Silks Office. → Consort Lu, Gao Wei's adoptive mother → First Rank Female Prime Minister of Qi (女相)
  - The talented eldest daughter of a wealthy ceramic maker, Lu Jia. She is also very smart and is an intuitive learner. Using her wits, analytics and optimism, she quickly is promoted through the ranks. She is extremely devoted to Gao Zhan and supports him in the future in court.
- Chen Xiao as Gao Zhan [Duke of Changguang]
  - The younger and more loved son of the deceased emperor. Son of the late Empress Yujiulu and was Huan Yun's childhood lover. Gao Zhan was originally the heir to the throne before Gao Yan. Due to political schemes, he ends up becoming the Duke of Changguang. He also shares a strong bond with his brother Gao Yan despite his hatred towards his brother's birth mother, Empress Dowager Lou.
- Qiao Renliang as Gao Yan [Emperor Xiaozhao]
  - The older, weak and less favoured son of the deceased emperor. He has always had an unrequited love for Xiao Huan Yun. He is kind-hearted and is in constant conflict between the rivalry of his mother, his brother and his beloved consort. He appreciates Lu Zhen's talent and becomes very good friends with her after knowing she and his brother are a couple.
- Yang Rong as Xiao Huan Yun [Noble Consort Xiao]
  - Princess Yong Shi of Liang 梁 → Noble Consort Xiao 蕭貴妃 → Empress Xiao 皇后
  - A princess of the fallen Liang Kingdom. She grew up with both Gao Zhan and Gao Yan and was Gao Zhan's first love. Huan Yun is a ruthless, scheming but very passionate woman. She holds the highest position in Gao Yan's harem as his Guifei (Noble Consort) and manages his harem.
- Tang Yixin as Shen Bi
  - Palace maid in training → Second-Class Attendant → First Class Attendant → Eighth Rank Lady Official at Department of Clothing, Si Yi Si (司衣司) → Sixth Rank Baolin (寶林) → Maid at Labor Workhouse → Madame Anyang of Wei Kingdom
  - Daughter of Minister Shen Fuzhi. Lu Zhen's main rival in the palace and immensely jealous of Lu Zhen and her talent. She is haughty, spiteful and proud. She also falls in love with Gao Zhan.

=== Supporting ===
==== Northern Qi ====
Imperial Family

- Leanne Liu as Lou Zhaojun [Empress Dowager Lou]
  - Gao Yan's birth mother.. Behind her virtuous and religious demeanour, she is ruthless, ambitious and vengeful.
- Bai Shan as Princess Ruru [Empress Long Ci]
  - Former Empress of Northern Qi. Gao Zhan and Gao Xiang's mother.
- Zhang Mingjian as Gao Huan [Emperor Xianwu]
  - Former Emperor of Northern Qi. Gao Yan, Gao Zhan, Gao Xiang's father.
- Tien Niu as Dowager Consort Zhou [Zhou Taifei]
  - Concubine of the late Emperor Wenmu, Gao Shusheng. She is Gao Yan, Gao Zhan and Gao Xiang's grandmother who resides at the Palace of Isolation and holds no real power. She loves and protects Lu Zhen, promoting her to a First-class attendant in charge of her palace before she died.
- Li Xin Yi as Zheng Meiren [Beauty Zheng]
  - Gao Huan's concubine. Sentenced to death by Lou Zhaojun.
- Li Yixiao as Gao Xiang [Elder Princess Zhun Yang]
  - Gao Zhan's biological elder sister. She constantly disapproves of Lu Zhen and objects her brother's love for her.
- Gao Yun Xiang as Xu Xianxiu [Elder Princess Prince Consort]
  - Gao Xiang's husband, the Minister of War.
- Zhang Jing as Imperial Concubine Zhao
  - Gao Yan's concubine.

People in the Palace [lady officials, eunuchs, servants]

- Maggie Cheung Ho-yee as Lou Qingqiang [Lou Shangshi, Fifth Rank Lady Official]
  - Lou Zhaojun's niece and closest advisor in the palace. She manages the Department of Internal Affairs with Wang Shangyi as her rival. She is ambitious and cares about personal power.
- Jiang Hong as Wang Xuan [Wang Shangyi, Fifth Rank Lady Official]
  - Noble Consort Xiao's close and loyal attendant. Manages the Department of Internal Affairs with Lou Qingqiang. She is strict and serious in her work and has a strong sense of justice.
- Emma Wu as He Dan Niang [Lu Zhen's best friend]
  - Third-Class Attendant → Second-Class Attendant → First-Class Attendant of the Palace of Isolation → Eighth Rank Lady Official → Seventh Rank Lady Official → Sixth Rank Lady Official of the Department of Food (posthumous)
  - A maid at the Palace of Isolation who becomes Lu Zhen's best friend. She is a kind-hearted and bright girl who loves food.
- Bao Wenjing as Lu Liuxiu [First-class attendant at Palace of Isolation]
  - Head maid serving Zhou Taifei before Lu Zhen's arrival. She constantly tries to frame Lu Zhen. After Zhou Taifei's death, Zhou Taifei appoints her as her companion to death.
- Chai Biyun as Lin Herui
  - Head maid serving Zhou Taifei with Liuxiu. She holds resentment towards Lu Zhen for stealing her position.
- Jin Qiaoqiao as Du Heng [Du Si Yi, Sixth Rank Ceremonial Officer]
  - Lu Zhen's mentor who is strict, practical and no-nonsense. She is promoted to Fifth Rank Shanggong managing the Department of Internal Affairs at the end of the series.
- Zhang Pingjuan as Chen Dianshi [Sixth Rank Lady Officer at the Department of Clothing]
- Liu Yizhen as Yang Wanqiu [Chief Maid at Yong Qin Court]
  - Lu Zhen's supportive and caring mentor in the palace.
- Liu Jiayuan as Hu Linglong [Head maid at Department of Treasures, Lu Zhen's confidant]
  - Lu Zhen's close confidant in the Department of Treasures as well as the Department of Clothing. She wholeheartedly admires Lu Zhen. However, manipulations by Shen Bi and misunderstandings leads her to betray Lu Zhen. She later confesses to her crimes and leaves the palace out of guilt.
- Tian Lu Han as Chen Qiu Niang [Shen Bi's friend]
- Yu Xintian as Hu Linglang [Head maid at Department of Treasures]
  - First-class maid at the Department of Treasures with her sister, Linglong. She is promoted to an Eighth Rank Lady Official in her department.
- Guo Xuan as Zhuang Liuli [Lu Zhen's confidant]
  - Originally a hopeless maid-in-training who Lu Zhen helps, becoming her close friend. Due to her efforts in assisting Lu Zhen with silk garments, she is promoted directly to an Eighth Rank Lady Official.
- Ren Xuehai as Zhu Erting [Fourth Rank Appraiser, Lu Zhen's mentor]
  - A skilled pottery carver and maker who helps Lu Zhen gain her promotion.
- Zhang Haiping as Li Dan [Zhu Erting's subordinate]
- Li Wenwen as Qiu Lamei [Lou Qingqiang's personal attendant]
  - First-class attendant of Lou Qingqiang and Empress Dowager Lou.
- Liu Baicha as Ruan Niang [Wang Xuan's personal attendant]
  - First-class attendant of Wang Xuan as well as Noble Consort Xiao's attendant.
- Xu Xin Yu as Li Yu Ming [Xiuwen Palace Attendant]
  - A maid in Gao Zhan's palace.
- Zhou Shao Dong as Gao Zhong [Gao Zhan's bodyguard]
- Zhang Hao Ran as Yuan Lu [Gao Zhan's eunuch]
- Tao Shuai as Yuan Fu [Head eunuch, Gao Yan's eunuch]
- Jiang Kaitong as Li Yuqiao [Xiuwen Palace Attendant]
  - A spy planted by Empress Dowager Lou by Gao Zhan's side who actually admires him. She is put to death by Noble Consort Xiao after she is discovered to be a spy.
- Chen Bing Qiang as Yuan Shou [Du Heng's attendant]
- An Linmin as Wang Shangshu [Court Minister]
- Feng Bao as Lou Jian [Court Minister]
  - Empress Dowager Lou's brother and Gao Yan's uncle. He was sentenced for plotting the murder of Gao Zhan.
- Wei Yu as Lou Zhao [Court Minister]

Lu Family

- Yue Yao Li as Lu Jia [Lu Zhen's father]
  - He owns the Lu family business of pottery. Xue Jin and Zhao Yinglan's husband and Lu Zhen and Lu Zhu's father.
- Wang Lin as Zhao Yinglan [Madame Zhao, Lu Zhen's stepmother]
  - A greedy and short-sighted woman. After Lu Zhen's promotion to a Sixth Lady Official, her father's case is retrialed and her stepmother is exposed for her crimes.
- Yuan Xiaoxu as Lu Zhu [Lu Zhen's sister]
  - Madame Zhao's biological daughter and Lu Zhen's step sister. Unlike her greedy and hateful mother, she admires and looks up to Lu Zhen. She marries Li Cheng.
- Dong Xian as Ge Cixiang [Lu Zhen's nanny]
- Li Shi Peng as Zhao Quan [Madame Zhao's brother]
- as Xue Jin [Lu Zhen's birth mother]
  - She was a dignified lady attendant of the royal family before the events of the series. She was rescued by Lu Jia and became his concubine.

Shen Family

- Xi Xue as Shen Jia Min [Sixth Rank Female Official]
  - She grew up privileged and spoiled by her older brother and father but still has a kind and soft heart. She is Gao Xiang's first choice to be Gao Zhan's legal wife.
- Li Yu Xuan as Shen Jia Yan [Second Rank Military Officer, Gao Zhan's subordinate]
  - He fell in love with Lu Zhen at first sight without knowing she was his sister's love rival and Gao Zhan's lover.
- Cao Yan Yan as Madame Shen
  - Shen Jia Yan and Shen Jia Min's mother.
- Yang Hong Wu as Shen Jue Wu [Fourth Grade Minister of Justice]
  - Shen Bi's father.

==== Western Regions ====
- Madina Memet as Du Mei Er [Merchant and dancer]
  - A dancer that was imprisoned by Empress Dowager Lou following the death of Emperor Xianwu. She befriends Lu Zhen in prison and helps her escape.
- Deng Sha as Tangut Batelan [Princess Yu Yang of Xian Bei Tribe]
  - Gao Yan's cousin and is bethrobed to Shen Jia Yuan.

==== Chen Kingdom ====
- Lu Jia Rong as Li Qiulan [Madame of Yue State]
  - Aunt of Princess Tongchang.
- Liu Yue as Chen Shuangyu [Princess Tongchang of Chen]
  - Becomes Gao Zhan's Empress.
- Chen Jingyu as Chen Qian
  - Emperor of the Southern Chen Kingdom. He rescues Gao Zhan and has three requests for his repayment.

==== Others ====
- Min Zheng as Tuoba Kuo [Emperor Gong of Western Wei]
- Zhou Hong as Wu Xiu [Daughter of General Wu Changfeng]
  - A consort candidate.
- Sun Xiao Fei as a palace attendant.
- Han Dong as Li Cheng
  - Originally Lu Zhen's fiancé, but he betrays her and marries Lu Zhu.

== Soundtrack ==
Legend of Lu Zhen - Original Television Soundtrack (《陆贞传奇》电视剧原声音乐大碟)
No.	Title	Lyrics	Music	Singers	Length
1.	"Cherish (珍惜)" (Opening theme)	Yu Zheng	Tan Xuan	Li Yuchun
2.	"Mood (心情)" (Ending theme)	Yu Zheng	Tan Xuan	Zhao Liying & Chen Xiao

== Ratings ==
CSM46 city ratings
Air date	Episode	Ratings	Audience share	Rank
May 5, 2013	1-3	1.133	3.03	1
May 6, 2013	4-6	1.294	3.55	1
May 7, 2013	7-9	1.565	4.30	1
May 8, 2013	10-12	1.634	4.42	1
May 9, 2013	13-15	1.754	4.74	1
May 10, 2013	16	1.29	3.92	1
May 11, 2013	17	1.245	3.88	1
May 12, 2013	18-20	1.858	5.24	1
May 13, 2013	21-23	1.898	5.24	1
May 14, 2013	24-26	1.935	5.43	1
May 15, 2013	27-29	2.009	5.60	1
May 16, 2013	30-32	2.180	5.99	1
May 17, 2013	33	1.756	5.04	1
May 18, 2013	34	1.588	4.81	1
May 19, 2013	35-37	2.116	5.71	1
May 20, 2013	38-40	2.113	5.80	1
May 21, 2013	41-43	2.202	6.10	1
May 22, 2013	44-46	2.291	6.34	1
May 23, 2013	47-49	2.257	6.36	1
May 24, 2013	50	1.832	5.53	1
May 25, 2013	51	2.055	6.04	1
May 26, 2013	52-54	2.546	6.76	1
May 27, 2013	55-57	2.702	7.50	1
May 28, 2013	58	2.212	6.74	1
May 29, 2013	59	2.283	6.76	1
Average		1.944	5.39	2013: No.3

National Network ratings (including CCTV)
Air date	Episode	Ratings	Audience share	Rank
May 5, 2013	1-3	1.60	4.77	3
May 6, 2013	4-6	1.91	5.72	1
May 7, 2013	7-9	2.20	6.61	1
May 8, 2013	10-12	2.38	6.97	1
May 9, 2013	13-15	2.53	7.30	1
May 10, 2013	16	2.2	7.08	1
May 11, 2013	17	2.2	7.08	1
May 12, 2013	18-20	2.2	7.08	1
May 13, 2013	21-23	2.53	7.89	1
May 14, 2013	24-26	2.66	8.10	1
May 15, 2013	27-29	2.83	8.69	1
May 16, 2013	30-32	3.17	9.47	1
May 17, 2013	33	2.85	8.96	1
May 18, 2013	34	2.85	8.96	1
May 19, 2013	35-37	2.85	8.96	1
May 20, 2013	38-40	3.11	9.70	1
May 21, 2013	41-43	3.22	9.99	1
May 22, 2013	44-46	3.30	10.51	1
May 23, 2013	47-49	3.30	10.40	1
May 24, 2013	50	3.46	10.66	1
May 25, 2013	51	3.46	10.66	1
May 26, 2013	52-54	3.46	10.66	1
May 27, 2013	55-57	3.90	12.06	1
May 28, 2013	58	2.84	10.04	1
May 29, 2013	59	3.15	10.73	1
Average		2.80	8.72	2013: 8th

China TV ratings
Air date	Weeks	Average ratings	Rank	Episode
August 9, 2013	1	0.35	7	01-02
August 12–16, 2013	2	0.51	4	03-07
August 19–23, 2013	3	0.74	5	08-12
August 26–30, 2013	4	0.88	4	13-17
September 2–6, 2013	5	0.77	4	18-22
September 9–13, 2013	6	0.79	4	23-27
September 16, 2013 - September 20, 2013	7	0.67	4	28-32
September 23–27, 2013	8	0.92	5	33-37
September 30 - October 4, 2013	9	1.04	4	38-42
October 7–9, 2013	10	1.07	4	43-45

- Highest ratings are marked in red, lowest ratings are marked in blue

== Reception ==
The series was the 8th highest rated drama of 2013 with an average rating of 1.944 (CMS46). It is also well received by South Korea viewers and led to increased recognition for Chen Xiao in the region.

== Awards and nominations ==
Year	Award	Category	Winner	Result
2013	China TV Drama Awards	Top 10 Television Series		Won
2013	China TV Drama Awards	Best New Actress	Zhao Liying	Won
2013	Asia Rainbow TV Awards	Actor with the Most Potential	Chen Xiao	Won
2013	LeTV Awards	Most Popular Actress	Zhao Liying	Won
2013	Tudou Young Choice Awards	Most Popular Actress (Mainland)	Zhao Liying	Won
2013	Tudou Young Choice Awards	Most Popular Actor (Mainland)	Chen Xiao	Won
2014	Huading Awards	Best New Actor	Chen Xiao	Nominated
2014	Huading Awards	Best New Actress	Zhao Liying	Nominated
