= Bai Shan =

Chinese actress

- Born: 4 December 1969 (age 56); Chengdu, Sichuan, China
- Education: Hunan Art School
- Occupation: Actress
- Years active: 1983–present

Chinese name
- Simplified Chinese: 白珊
Transcriptions
Standard Mandarin
- Hanyu Pinyin: Bái Shān

Bai Shan (白珊; born 4 December 1969) is a Chinese actress. She is currently under contract with Yuzheng Studio. She is especially known for her performances in TV dramas. Born in Chengdu, Sichuan, she graduated from Hunan Art School. Some of her best known roles include Consort Bo in Beauty's Rival in Palace (2010), Lu Mingzhu in Beauty World (2011), and Yuegui in Xiao hongyan (2012).

== Biography ==
She was born on 4 December 1969 in Chengdu, Sichuan, China, into an artistic family. Her mother was a dancer, her father a famous composer. With the influence of her parents, she embarked on an artistic career early on in her life. As she showed musical talent as a child, her father hoped that she would become a composer. However, she had a passion for acting, and eventually chose to become an actress.

She started her career starring in several films and television works. Her breakthrough came with her portrayal of An Huaying in the 2003 movie Piaoliang de nu linju. She went on to star in more important works, including the 2006 TV series Yōuyōu cùn cǎo xīn (悠悠寸草心), starring as Wu Jinfeng. Her starring roles since then include Consort Bo in the 2010 TV series Beauty's Rival in Palace, Lu Mingzhu in the 2011 TV series Beauty World, and Yuegui in Xiao hongyan (2012). She also starred as Empress Yujiulu in the 2013 television series Legend of Lu Zhen, and as Jin Ruolan in The Legend of Chasing Fish the same year. In 2014 she was Tian Wanniang in Palace 3: The Lost Daughter, in 2015 she starred as Lady Gouyi in Love Yunge from the Desert, and in 2016 as Liang Guiren in Legend of Ban Shu. In 2019 she was Imperial Consort Dowager Yu in Story of Yanxi Palace. Also in 2019, she starred as Li Xuedai in The Legend of Haolan and as Lady Su in Investiture of the Gods.

== Filmography ==
Year	Title	Chinese title	Roles	Remarks
1983	Legend of Lu Mansion	呂府傳奇	Xiaowen	
1986	Gāoshān xià de huāhuán	高山下的花環	Wu Shuang	
1986	Xié mèizi	鞋妹子	Yu Xiaoquan	
1990	Foreign Girl	外來妹	Xiuying	
1991	Sea of Mist	霧帆海	Qiaomei	
1992	Yīxiào zhì bǎi bìng	一笑治百病	Han Yue	
1996	The village where the smoke drifts by	烽煙飄過的村落	Taoer	
1996	Yě hú yù	野狐峪	Caomei	
1998	Ji Yun	紀曉嵐	Wen Luan	
1999	Jīnshì qíng mí	今世情迷	Qian Guiru	
2000	Bǎi xì rén chuánqí	百戲人傳奇	Huang Bixue	
2000	Tái shāng qiānjīn	台商千金	Lin Yaqian	
2001	Yǔ yáng gòng wǔ	與羊共舞	Solan	
2001	Májiàng lóu de gùshì	麻將樓的故事	Hui Hui	
2002	Bloodline	血脉	Bai Shan	
2003	Yǔ ài tóngxíng	與愛同行	Tao Xinyi	
2003	Fǎ wǎng tiānxià	法網天下	Yangliu	
2004	Bùkě chùmō de zhēnqíng	不可觸摸的真情	Zhang Cimu	
2006	Yōuyōu cùn cǎo xīn	悠悠寸草心	Wu Jinfeng	
2007	Rúguǒ hái yǒu míngtiān	如果還有明天	Chen Ling	
2008	Fùguì zài tiān	富貴在天	Zhuo Manjun	
2008	Rénjiān yānhuǒ	人間煙火	Xiumei	
2009	Xián qīliáng mǔ	賢妻良母	Zhu Yufang	
2009	Měirén xīn jì	美人心計	Consort Bo	
2010	Dà yāhuan	大丫鬟	Qin Yuexiang	
2010	Beauty World	唐宮美人天下	Lu Mingzhu	
2012	Qīngchéng xuě	傾城雪	Mrs. Jiang	
2012	Xiào hóngyán	笑紅顏	Zhou Yuegui	
2012	Wáng de nǚrén	王的女人	Shen Xueru	
2012	Shānhé liàn·měirén wú lèi	山河戀·美人無淚	Tana	
2013	Swordsman	笑傲江湖	Lin Zhennan's wife	
2013	Wángzhě qīngfēng	王者清風	Mei Linying	
2013	Legend of Lu Zhen	陸貞傳奇	Empress Yujiulu	
2013	The Legend of Chasing Fish	追魚傳奇	Jin Ruolan	
2013	Fēnghuǒ jiārén	烽火佳人	Zhou Mu	Cameo
2014	Palace 3: The Lost Daughter	宮鎖連城	Tian Wanniang	Episodes 7 and 23
2014	Jiànxiá	剑侠 (八仙前传)	Kǔ niáng	
2015	Ài nǐ, wàn lǚ qiān sī	爱你，万缕千丝	Chen Qinghua	Cameo
2015	Love Yunge from the Desert	大汉情缘之云中歌	Lady Gouyi	
2015	Legend of Ban Shu	班淑傳奇	Liang Guiren	
2017	Shǒuhù lìrén	守护丽人	Zhu Min	
2018	Story of Yanxi Palace	延禧攻略	Consort Dowager Yu	
2019	The Legend of Haolan	皓镧传	Xue Dai	
2019	Investiture of the Gods	封神演义	Madame Sue	Cameo
2019	Hǎitáng jīng yǔ yānzhī tòu	海棠经雨胭脂透	Mrs. Gu	
TBA	Tíxiào shūxiāng	啼笑书香	TBA	
