= Beauty's Rival in Palace =

2010 Chinese historical series

- Official poster
- Also known as: Schemes of a Beauty
- Genre: Historical fiction Romance
- Based on: Turbulence in the Empress' Chamber by Xiao Qiying
- Written by: Yu Zheng
- Directed by: Wu Jinyuan; Liang Xinquan; Chan Kwok-wah
- Starring: Ruby Lin; Sammul Chan; Wang Likun; Yang Mi; Mickey He
- Opening theme: Falling Flower by Ruby Lin
- Ending theme: Jiao Fang Hall by Mickey He
- Country of origin: China
- Original language: Mandarin
- No. of episodes: 40

Production
- Executive producers: Lin Guohua; Xu Longhe; Zhan Na
- Producer: Yu Zheng
- Production locations: Wuxi; Wuhan; Hengdian World Studios
- Cinematography: Zhang Zhiwei
- Camera setup: Multi camera
- Running time: 45 minutes per episode

Original release
- Network: Shanghai Media Group
- Release: 15 March – 11 June 2010

Related
- Beauty World (2011); In Love With Power (2012)

Beauty's Rival in Palace
- Traditional Chinese: 美人心計
- Simplified Chinese: 美人心计
- Literal meaning: Schemes of a Beauty
Transcriptions
Wu
- Romanization: Me Nyin Sin Cin
Yue: Cantonese
- Jyutping: Mei5 Jan4 Sam1 Gai3

Beauty's Rival in Palace (Chinese: 美人心計; pinyin: Měirén Xīnjì; lit. 'Schemes of a Beauty') is a 2010 Chinese television series adapted from Xiao Qiying's short story Turbulence in the Empress' Chamber (未央沉浮). It was first broadcast on Shanghai TV Drama on 15 March 2010. The series was one of the highest-rated Chinese TV series in 2010.

Set in Chang'an, China during the beginnings of the Han dynasty, Beauty's Rival in Palace tells a dramatised account of Empress Dou (Ruby Lin) and how her efforts and achievements in the imperial court positively influenced the reign of her husband Emperor Wen (Sammul Chan), which paved the way for the creation of the Rule of Wen and Jing.

== Synopsis ==
During the early Han dynasty, young Du Yunxi's mother is drawn into a palace conflict which results in her entire family being executed. When she grows up, she unexpectedly enters the palace as a maid. She displays extraordinary talents when she arranges for Lady Li's child to be swapped under the care of Empress Zhang. Her intelligence impresses Empress Dowager Lü, and she is sent to Liu Heng, Prince of Dai, with a new identity as Dou Yifang, so she could spy on him.

In order to rid the world of further sufferings under the regime and at the same time earn the trust of Empress Dowager Lü, Dou Yifang suggests to her husband Liu Heng to start training his army under the guise of building his grand tomb. People, believing that she is bringing downfall to the empire, plead for her to be put to death. But nonetheless, Liu Heng trusts her completely and subsequently makes her his empress.

=== Lurking in Dai ===
At the beginning of the Western Han dynasty, the fates of Yunxi and Shen'er intertwine as Yunxi's mother, one of Consort Bo's palace maids, is embroiled in the schemes of the then-Empress (Lü Zhi), who is very jealous of her mistress. To cover up a botched assassination of the young Liu Heng, Empress Lü places the blame on Yunxi's mother and wants her entire family to be executed. Consort Bo, knowing that her servant is innocent, plans for the maid's escape but the road that was supposed to lead them to freedom is surrounded by Empress Lü's guards. Nie Shen'er's father futilely helps Yunxi's mother to escape entrapment, but they ultimately sacrifice themselves to save their children. Yunxi and Shen'er become orphans and develop a sisterly bond, but they are soon separated as Yunxi's uncle abandons Shen'er at the suggestion of his wife. Lost on the streets, a brothel proprietor takes Shen'er and grooms her to be a courtesan.

After growing up, Yunxi is selected as a palace maid; Shen'er also enters the imperial palace in the name of another person and meets Yunxi accidentally. Yunxi knows the rules very well – living in the palace is like diving into the treacherous sea. She always behaves carefully and resolves crisis with her wisdom, which helps her gain the trust of the Emperor (Liu Ying) and Empress (Zhang Yan). Despite using a lot of tricks to gain Liu Ying's favor, Shen'er doesn't succeed. This leads to the start of rivalry between Yunxi and Shen'er. Empress Dowager Lü appreciates Yunxi's intelligence. She uses Shen'er's life to threaten and force Yunxi to change her name to Dou Yifang and become a spy in Dai, monitoring the behavior of the Prince of Dai (Liu Heng) and the Princess Dowager of Dai (Consort Bo).

The people who escort Dou Yifang to Dai are Zhou Yafu, a general of Dai, and her maid, Mo Xueyuan, who is also the Empress Dowager's spy. In Zhou Yafu's mind, Yifang cannot be trusted; in Yifang's mind, Xueyuan is there to keep an eye on her on behalf of Empress Dowager Lü. This causes all of them to distrust each other. In the end, Mo Xueyuan becomes Yifang's trusted friend because she realises Xueyuan is Ah'chou, an ugly maid she knew before becoming a spy.

After arriving at Dai, Yifang finds that Liu Heng behaves frivolously and dissolutely, however, the truth is that he is someone who really cares about his people. Thus, she changes her mind and decides to help him by sending fake information to Empress Dowager Lü.

=== Consign by the Princess Consort of Dai ===
In the past, Liu Heng's mother, Consort Bo, mutilated her face in order to show her loyalty to Empress Dowager Lü; she rarely goes out, with the intent to hide her abilities by pretending to be weak. In her mind, Liu Heng's true wife and her only daughter-in-law is Zhou Zirang, the younger sister of Zhou Yafu, a kind and righteous woman. Yunxi and Zirang come to Dai together with the rest of the ladies-in-waiting sent by the Empress Dowager as gifts to Liu Heng.

Qingning, Liu Heng's wife and the princess consort of Dai, is another spy sent by Empress Dowager Lü, but she fell in love with Liu Heng at first sight and sent fake information to protect him. Qingning eventually dies to protect Yifang's secret identity and extracts a promise from her to take care of Liu Heng. Starting from that moment, Yifang opens her heart to Liu Heng and Liu Heng also falls in love with her. However, Consort Bo has Zirang named princess consort of Dai in place of the late Qingning. The battle in the palace intensifies as the women fight for Liu Heng's attention, especially against Yifang who has won his heart. Coupled with Consort Bo's belief that she is a calamity by being too wise for a woman, this gives Dou Yifang a restless life hounded with troubles.

Against all odds, she overcomes plots and schemes with Liu Heng's support. Sensing the unrest following the assumed death of Liu Ying, Liu Heng wishes to raise troops but is troubled about how to do so without alarming Empress Dowager Lü. Yifang helps her husband on the matters of training an army in secret by suggesting to him to order the building of a grand mausoleum to achieve immortality, which in turn tricks the Empress Dowager into believing that she has led Liu Heng stray, therefore rendering him harmless. This also makes the Dai ministers think that she is a bad influence, and request Liu Heng to sentence her to death. Yifang tolerates the negative impressions of the ministers and carries on to let the rumors against her flourish in order to further deceive Empress Dowager Lü. Only Liu Heng understands her and respects her sacrifices.

Later, through the efforts of Consort Bo, Zirang becomes pregnant and prematurely gives birth to a son. Before she dies, Zirang asks Yifang to bring up her son. Years later, Yifang also gives birth to Princess Guantao and Prince Liu Qi. She treats the three children fairly, but Zirang's son is murdered by Zisu, a maid whom Consort Bo unsuccessfully tries to use to distract Liu Heng from Yifang; Zisu is indebted to Yifang so she tries to pay the debt by removing the obstacle to the crown for Liu Qi. Everyone believes that Dou Yifang is the one who murdered the child and Consort Bo's hate for her grows even more. Yifang uses this unfortunate incident to further help Liu Heng in plotting insurrection.

=== Battle in the palace ===
The Emperor (Liu Ying) is looking for a way to escape his depressing life in the palace and the control of Empress Dowager Lü. Shen'er helps him to sneak out by paying a talented impersonator to disguise Liu Ying; however, they are caught by Empress Dowager Lü. After Liu Ying tells his mother about his wish, the Empress Dowager eventually gives him freedom and announced to the public that Liu Ying has died. Shen'er, who is hungry for power, is then promoted to an official position, not knowing the consequences that will follow. Empress Dowager Lü enthrones Liu Gong, the son of Liu Ying and the Empress (Zhang Yan), who is in truth Liu Ying's son by his concubine Lady Li, and all the concubines of the former Emperor are ordered to be sacrificed.

To escape this coming doom, Shen'er finds ways to get close to the Empress Dowager's nephew, Lü Lu, and manages to escape from being buried alive. She is a woman who wishes to be as powerful as Empress Dowager Lü and is overwhelmed by the temptation of wealth, always finding ways to fulfill her own ambitions. In one of her efforts to seek power, she advises Lü Lu to become the Grand Commandant. In a turn of fate, Empress Dowager Lü arrests Shen'er for giving ill-advices to Lü Lu and being a bad influence on the young Liu Gong. In order to save herself, Shen'er unwisely tells the young Emperor about his true parentage and how the Empress Dowager executed his birth mother to give a son to Empress Zhang. She asks Lü Lu to use his troops to arrest Empress Dowager Lü and Liu Gong, and plans to enthrone a new emperor. Liu Heng and Liu Zhang team up; the Empress Dowager dies with regret; Lü Lu and Shen'er barely manage to escape. Wang Zhi, the daughter of Shen'er and Lü Lu, is taken away by Mo Li.

At the end of the rebellion, Liu Heng and Liu Zhang are fighting for the throne. Dou Yifang helps Liu Heng to win the heart of people and uses Liu Zhang's wife, Lü Yu, as bait.

After becoming the empress, Dou Yifang finds Shen'er and lets her live in the imperial palace. Shen'er goes on to play the role of a repentant and caring younger sister to Yifang, but in fact, at every step, she wants to take her place. Shen'er deliberately designs plans to win Liu Heng's favor and manages to give birth to his son, Liu Wu.

Under the instructions of the Prime Minister, Dou Changjun poses as Dou Yifang's lost brother to spy on her and expose her identity. Instead of exposing him, she buys his allegiance immediately and uses him as a double-agent to infiltrate the political scene. He eventually falls in love with her. They become soulmates and he helps her go through her darkest hours when she and Liu Heng fight a cold war with each other for two years.

Shen'er views Yifang's son, Liu Qi, as an obstacle in her son's path to the throne. Shen'er plots and devises schemes to overthrow Yifang. She plans to reveal Yifang's relationship with the late Empress Dowager Lü. She also uses Zhou Yafu's hatred towards Yifang due to the death of Zirang's son and further plans the rape and murder of Mo Xueyuan to enlist Zhou Yafu in her conspiracy against Yifang, and secretly allies with Empress Dowager Bo who holds her own grudges against Yifang. Later, Shen'er devises a witchcraft affair by planting voodoo dolls inscribed with the names of Liu Heng and Liu Wu in Yifang's palace in order to charge Yifang with treason. However, Yifang changes the name from Liu Wu to Liu Qi and plants the dolls in Shen'er's palace. In the end, Shen'er's own plot backfires and her doomed fate is sealed. Shen'er confesses her crimes, and in return Yifang promises to protect her son, Liu Wu.

=== Hostility between mother and son ===
In an accident, Liu Qi kills Liu Xian, the spoiled son of Liu Bi, Prince of Wu. Liu Bi seeks to have his son's death avenged and pressures the Emperor to execute Liu Qi. The imperial court is in a difficult conflict as Wu is in the frontier region – if Liu Bi starts a rebellion for this matter, the whole empire will be in disarray as they will lose a protector against foreign invaders. Yifang wisely maneuvers through the conflict by staking Liu Qi's life to pressure Liu Bi into accepting his son's death as an accident. Although Yifang managed to save the empire, her son grows apart from her, believing that he has no place in her heart. The disheartened, gradually alienated Liu Qi then secretly meets Wang Zhi, his childhood acquaintance, and is deeply attracted to her.

Despite being ill, Liu Heng often wakes up at night to care for Yifang during her blindness. He does his best to hide his illness, so as to not worry Yifang. At the moment of their final parting, Liu Heng tells Yifang that he has no regrets in life and he loves her with all his heart. Liu Heng dies in the summer of 157 BC and afterwards, Liu Qi becomes the new emperor.

However, Yifang, now empress dowager, deeply loves Shen’er's only son Liu Wu, and out of fear of harm that might come to him, she convinces Liu Qi to appoint him as crown prince, to which Liu Qi agrees. Sensing the turbulence in the imperial palace and wanting to secure their own positions, Wang Zhi and Princess Guantao forge an alliance, in which the latter promised to help Liu Che ascend to the throne, but Liu Che must marry her daughter, Chen Jiao.

Liu Qi attempts to consolidate the imperial power by subdividing the individual fiefdoms into smaller states. The vassal princes do not consent to having their powers weakened and rise against the empire – which is famously known as the Rebellion of the Seven States. Zhou Yafu is dispatched by the Emperor to defeat the rebellion and bring peace. In one of the war's decisive moments, Zhou Yafu is surrounded and requires reinforcements from Liu Wu's Liang which turns the tide back in their favor.

After the war, Liu Wu is commended lavishly for his contributions and slowly grows arrogant and vain. He starts building palaces and using titles reserved for the emperor, as well as preparing an emperor's gown for himself. When Liu Qi tells this to Yifang, she allows him to punish him in whichever way he deems fit, as long as he spares Liu Wu's life. However Liu Wu is subsequently assassinated – Liu Qi reports that he was mugged and murdered. Yifang is greatly distressed and accused Liu Qi of his younger brother's murder.

Liu Qi's already frail health, coupled with the exertion required by the court affairs, soon result in terminal illness. As he is dying, Liu Qi wants to see his mother again; however, still holding grudges because of Liu Wu's death, Yifang refuses to meet him. Liu Qi then commands to be carried to the door of the Empress Dowager's chamber, but she continues to refuse to see him. Liu Qi calls upon Yifang in a tender voice, as a longing son calls to his long-departed mother. Eventually, his heartfelt speech slowly reaches Yifang’s heart. With tears in their eyes, both mother and son hug tightly and at Liu Qi’s last breath, they are reconciled.

=== Succession intrigues ===
After taking the throne, Liu Qi favors Wang Zhi, although Grand Empress Dowager Bo has set her grandniece, Bo Qiaohui, to be his wife. While Empress Bo cannot give birth to a son, Wang Zhi gives birth to Liu Che and another concubine surnamed Li gives birth to Liu Rong. Liu Che shows wisdom and intelligence since childhood, which prompts the attention of Liu Qi and the dismay of Empress Bo and Lady Li.

As the Empress doesn't have a son, Liu Qi creates his eldest son, Liu Rong, as crown prince. Wanting to eliminate potential rivals to her son's position, Lady Li manipulates Empress Bo into trying to kill Consort Wang. In the end, Lady Li's scheme is discovered; as a result, Liu Rong is stripped of his title and exiled along with his mother. Consort Wang's son, Liu Che, is eventually appointed as crown prince.

=== The end of one's era ===
Liu Qi dies in 141 BC and is succeeded by Liu Che, while Yifang becomes the grand empress dowager.

During the Lantern Festival, Liu Che and Chen Jiao are arguing in their chambers. The palace maids inform the Grand Empress Dowager; she rushes to mediate their conflict, but overhears Liu Che saying that Chen Jiao's mother, Princess Guantao, arranged assassins to secretly kill Liu Wu, so that Liu Che's path to the throne would be easier. Yifang collapses in sadness and begins to cry, lamenting that she had misunderstood Liu Qi, and that all her family members are doing nothing but harming each other.

In the last scene, an old Yifang, accompanied by Empress Dowager Wang and Zhou Yafu, is reminiscing about the past as a group of ladies-in-waiting who had just entered the imperial palace is presented to them. One of them is Wei Zifu, Liu Che's future empress. Yifang's days of scheming are over as Wei Zifu's days are just starting. The audience is also informed that after her death, Dou Yifang was buried alongside Liu Heng.

== Cast ==
- Ruby Lin as Du Yunxi / Dou Yifang / Tian Xianglian
  - Lin Miaoke as young Du Yunxi
- Sammul Chan as Liu Heng
- Yang Mi as Mo Xueyuan
- Wang Likun as Nie Shen'er / Nie Ao / Wang Zhi
  - Jiang Yiyi as young Nie Shen'er / young Wang Zhi
- Mickey He as Zhou Yafu
- Myolie Wu as Lü Yu
- Dai Chunrong as Lü Zhi
- Bai Shan as Consort Bo
- Feng Shaofeng as Liu Zhang
- Luo Jin as Liu Ying / Dou Changjun
  - Mu Qing as young Liu Ying
- Gao Hao as Liu Qi
  - Ma Ruihao as young Liu Qi
- Gao Yang as Bo Qiaohui
- Deng Sha as Lady Li
- Zhang Tong as Shen Bijun
- Su Qing as Zhang Yan
  - Dong Hui as young Zhang Yan
- Du Junze as Lü Lu
- Sun Feifei as Qingning
- Qu Yue as Zisu
- Tammy Chen as Concubine Li
- Yan Kuan as Liu Shaokang
- Huang Haibing as Nie Feng
- Frankie Lam as Jin Wangsun
- Miao Luoyi as Xiang Moyu
- Zhou Muyin as Zhou Ziran
- Tian Zitian as Yu Jinse
- Han Junzi as Jiang Si
- Gong Mi as Chen Jiao
  - Li Xingchen as young Chen Jiao
- Zhang Meng as Wei Zifu
- Zhang Xiaochen as Liu Wu
- Li Sha as Mo Li
- Lü Jiarong as Princess Yuan of Lu
- Qi Wei as Princess Guantao
  - Zhang Xueying as young Princess Guantao
- Deng Xibin as Wang Yuan
- Lee Yiu-king as Tian Daye
- Ge Ziming as Tian Guochun
- Duan Junhao as Ma Lu
- Li Qinqin as Jin Zhi
- Chen Shidan as Princess Pingyang
- Mao Zijun as Liu Che

== Production ==
Due to its large and diverse cast as well as expensive set and costume production, the series attracted international attention during its production stages. Another reason is due to the popularity of lead actress Ruby Lin in countries such as South Korea and Japan.

The series was primary filmed in Wuxi, Wuhan, and Hengdian World Studios. It has a production budget of ¥50 million (US$7.3 million), and employed the special effects team from Hollywood. Other notable cast members include the stunt choreography team from Zhang Yimou's Hero and music composers of Red River Valley.

== Soundtrack ==
| No. | Title | Singer | Length |
|---|---|---|---|
| 1. | "Falling Flowers (落花)" (Opening theme song) | Ruby Lin |
| 2. | "Jiao Fang Hall (椒房殿)" (Ending theme song) | Mickey He |
| 3. | "Green Lotus (青莲)" | Jiang Yiyi |

== Reception ==
The series is one of the highest rated series of 2010 and received viewership of more than 19 million when it was first aired on Shanghai TV Drama. It was also the first VOD premiere in China, with 270,000 concurrent users watching.

There were some reports lately saying that Beauty's Rival in Palace based its plot on TVB's Beyond the Realm of Conscience. The director denied this, claiming the first draft of the script for the series was released when Beyond the Realm of Conscience was still in its scriptwriting stage.

== Awards and nominations ==
5th Seoul International Drama Awards (South Korea)

- Won: Most Popular Actress – Ruby Lin (tied)
- Nominated: Most Popular Actor – Sammul Chan

2011 YOUKU Entertainment Award

- Won: Best TV series of the year
- Won: Most Popular TV Actress – Ruby Lin
- Won: Best Actress (Hong Kong & Taiwan) – Ruby Lin

QQ Annual Entertainment Star Award

- Won: Most Popular Actress – Ruby Lin

2011 China TV Drama Awards

- Won: Top 10 Television Series (#7)

2010 China TV Drama Awards

- Won: Most Popular Actress (Hong Kong & Taiwan) – Ruby Lin

2011 4th DAN Movie Awards (Vietnam)

- Won: Favorite Drama (China)
- Won: Favorite Actress (Taiwan & Singapore) – Ruby Lin
- Won: Favorite Actor (Hong Kong) – Sammul Chan
- Won: Favorite Couple – Ruby Lin & Sammul Chan
- Nominated: Favorite OST – "Luo Hua" by Ruby Lin
- Nominated: Favorite Character (China) – Dou Yifang (portrayed by Ruby Lin)

2012 Huading Awards

- Nominated: Best Actress – Ruby Lin

== International broadcast ==
Far East

| Country | Channel | Title |
|---|---|---|
| China | Shanghai TV Drama | 美人心计 (Meiren Xinji) |
| Hong Kong | TVB HD Jade | 美人心計 (Mei-jan Sam-gai) |
| Indonesia | Vision 2 Drama | Beauty's Rival in Palace |
| Japan | Tokyo Broadcasting System | 美人心計 〜一人の妃と二人の皇帝〜 Bijin Shinkei: Hitori no Kisaki to Futari no Kotei |
| Malaysia | TV2 | Beauty's Rival in the Palace |
| Philippines | TeleAsia | Beauty's Rival in Palace |
| Singapore | VV Drama | Beauty's Rival in Palace / 美人心计 (Meiren Xinji) |
| South Korea | ZHTV | 미인심계 (Miin Simgye) |
| Taiwan | CTV Main Channel | 美人心計 (Meiren Xinji) |
| Vietnam | Vietnam Television | Mỹ Nhân Tâm Kế |
| Thailand | newTV | จอมนางชิงบัลลังก์ (Cxm Nāng Ching Bạllạngk̒) |

Arab world

- كيد النساء (Kid Al Nissae) – Distributed by Middle East Media

Latin America

- Belleza y Rivalidad en el Palacio – Distributed by Latin Media Corporation
