= Rose Martial World =

2008 Chinese-Hong Kong TV series

- Official poster
- 玫瑰江湖
- Genre: Wuxia; Romance
- Written by: Yu Zheng
- Directed by: Peter Yuen; Wang Shaojie
- Presented by: Tan Xinguo
- Starring: Huo Siyan; Sun Feifei; Wallace Chung; Mickey He; Sheren Tang; Damian Lau; Sammul Chan; Feng Shaofeng
- Opening theme: "Jianghu Song" (江湖谣) by Mickey He
- Ending theme: "Flowers Bloom, Flowers Fall" (花开花落) by Sun Feifei
- Countries of origin: China; Hong Kong
- Original language: Mandarin
- No. of episodes: 30

Production
- Executive producer: Lin Guohua
- Producer: Yu Zheng
- Production location: Shanghai
- Camera setup: Multi camera
- Running time: ≈45 minutes per episode
- Production companies: Yu Zheng Studio; H&R Century Pictures

Original release
- Release: 2008

Rose Martial World (玫瑰江湖) is a Chinese-Hong Kong wuxia-romance television series produced by Yu Zheng and directed by Peter Yuen and Wang Shaojie, starring cast members from mainland China and Hong Kong. It was first broadcast in Taiwan in 2008. Yu Zheng later published a novel of the same title during the series' 2009 broadcast in mainland China.

== Synopsis ==
The series is set in the jianghu of early 20th-century Republican China. Chaos and bloodshed ensue when the Ming Castle, a prominent martial arts clan, starts attacking other clans in a bid to unite the jianghu under its control. Jun Qiluo and her father Jun Wuji are collecting weapons from the dead bodies of fallen fighters when they discover Shen Siru, a girl who has survived by hiding among the corpses.

Years later, both girls have grown up and developed different personalities: Jun Qiluo is more rugged and outgoing, while Shen Siru is more gentle and introverted. They meet and fall in love with the same man, Mu Sheng. Although Mu Sheng initially has romantic feelings for Jun Qiluo, he starts distancing himself from her upon realising that he prefers Shen Siru, who takes advantage of the situation to get closer to Mu Sheng. Jun Qiluo ultimately forgives Mu Sheng and Shen Siru for taking away her happiness, and finds solace with Lin Chuyi, a homeless man.

When the Ming Castle's master Ming Bujie holds an audition for a bride, Jun Qiluo and Shen Siru participate, and Jun Qiluo is initially selected. However, Shen Siru, wanting to gain a higher social status, offers to take Jun Qiluo's place. Ming Bujie is violent and abusive towards Shen Siru, who starts having an affair with Ming Bujie's nephew Ming Shaoqing. Together, Shen Siru and Ming Shaoqing conspire to murder Ming Bujie and take control of the Ming Castle.

Shen Siru blames Jun Qiluo for her suffering and imprisons the Jun family. Later, she forces Jun Qiluo to marry Lin Chuyi; Jun Qiluo reluctantly agrees to save her family. After the marriage, Mu Sheng goes to the Ming Castle to confront Lin Chuyi, resulting in a duel between them. They are forced to stop and kicked out of the castle.

Years later, Jun Qiluo learns that Shen Siru has abandoned Ming Shaoqing and married Mu Sheng instead. Feeling resentful towards Shen Siru for stealing her first love, Jun Qiluo plots her revenge against Shen Siru and Mu Sheng with the aid of Lin Chuyi.

== Cast ==
- Huo Siyan as Jun Qiluo
  - Dong Hui as Jun Qiluo (younger)
- Sun Feifei as Shen Siru
  - Zhang Xueying as Shen Siru (younger)
- Wallace Chung as Mu Sheng
- Mickey He as Lin Chuyi
- Sheren Tang as Yin Xuehan
- Damian Lau as Jun Wuji
- Sammul Chan as Ming Shaoqing
- Feng Shaofeng as Cen Yetong
- Wang Xiaochen as Hua Jieyu
- Xiao Yuyu as Yang Xibing
- Liu Guanxiang as Ming Bujie
- Zhang Chunzhong as Yuan Tiangang
- Marco Li as Zhanshen
- Han Zhenhua as Lin Chuyi's father
- Guo Yongzhen as Mu Zheng
- Zhou Bowen as Daniu
- Song Yang as Shuhuai
- Li Xia as Deshu
- Ji Yang as Chaitou
- Cheng Zehu as Mu Yu
- Liu Junbing as Fengqin
- Bai Shengli as Zhao Qi
- Ye Xinyu as Shensuanzi
- Ma Ming as Hongliang
- Liu Guanxiang as Ming Bujie
- Wei Xiaojun as Yun Jiang
- Meng Tingyi as Liruo
- Zhu Hong as Yueya'er
- Zhu Pengcheng as Elder Fu
- Deng Xibin as Branch Master Fang
