= The Palace (2013 film) =

- Film poster
- Traditional Chinese: 宮鎖沉香
- Simplified Chinese: 宫锁沉香
- Hanyu Pinyin: Gōngsuǒ Chénxiāng
- Directed by: Pan Anzi
- Screenplay by: Yu Zheng
- Produced by: Du Yang; Li Jinwen
- Starring: Zhou Dongyu; Chen Xiao; Zhao Liying
- Cinematography: Zou Lianyou
- Edited by: Cheung Ka-fai
- Music by: Peter Kam
- Production companies: Hunan Broadcasting System; Hunan Economic Channel; Yu Zheng Studio; EE-Media
- Distributed by: Wanda Film and Television Media Co., Ltd.
- Release date: August 13, 2013 (China)
- Running time: 115 minutes
- Country: China
- Language: Mandarin

The Palace also known as Palace: Lock Sinensis is a 2013 Chinese historical romance film. This film was directed by Pan Anzi and written by Yu Zheng, and starring Zhou Dongyu, Chen Xiao and Zhao Liying.

== Plot ==
During the reign of the Kangxi Emperor, Yaojia Chenxiang entered the Forbidden Palace as a lowly servant. Chenxiang learned the ways of surviving in the palace and became close friends with another servant named Liuli and Chunshou, a eunuch. She also meets Yinxiang, a prince raised by Consort De and is friends with the fourth prince Yinzhen. They meet by chance, but she never reveals her identity to him. He later searches for this mystery girl and Liuli claims that she was the mystery girl.

Liuli betrays Chenxiang to become the di fujin (official wife) of Yinxiang. Chenxiang is heartbroken but becomes Liuli's servant in order to protect Chunshou, who was tortured by Liuli. As Liuli's servant, Chenxiang is humiliated and forced to only look at Yinxiang from a distance. One night, she enters Liuli's bedchamber only to find out that she carries an affair with Yuntang, another prince. Liuli is mad at Chenxiang, and increases her punishments.

In a hunt between the Emperor and the Princes, Yinxiang was blinded and lost his visions, and was placed under confinement as he was seen as a threat who may want to battle for the future throne. During this time, Chenxiang visited him daily although Yinxiang thought this was Liuli.

The Fourth Prince informed Yinxiang that Liuli had been having an affair with the ninth Prince, and confronted her (but not knowing that this was actually Chenxiang he confronted). He told her that he does not want to see her ever again, and Chenxiang then stopped visiting him.

In the meantime, there was a power struggle between the Princes after emperor Kang Xi's death, with the ninth Prince trying to take the throne. However, the fourth Prince was able to manipulate the situation to his advantage and became the Yongzheng Emperor in the end. As he and Yinxiang had always been close, upon him becoming the emperor he then tasked the Imperial Doctors to restore Yinxiang's visions.

Yinxiang's visions are then restored by now although he still doesn't know that the woman visiting him all along has been Chenxiang. Liuli, after being found of her involvement with the ninth Prince, tried to escape the palace by trying to convince Yinxiang that she will tell him the real identity of the woman he truly loves if he prepared a horse for her to escape the palace and with some money. However, Yinxiang found that Liuli played a trick on him and refused to tell him, attempting to run away from the palace only to be shot with arrows to death as ordered by the Emperor.

It turned out that the Yongzheng Emperor knows the real identity of the mystery woman all along being Chenxiang but ordered her that no one can tell Yinxiang because the latter still has a lot to achieve in the palace and will be distracted by Chenxiang if he found out.

Time passed, and Chenxiang's time to leave the palace has come as she now has become 25, and the emperor was generous to offer her 100 golden taels.

Before she leaves the palace and said her goodbye to her eunuch friend, she went to visit the abandoned part of the palace one last time to reminisce where she first met Yinxiang, only to found out that he was already there waiting for her. He finally realized that it was Chenxiang all along who he truly loved from the beginning. He declared his love to her and promised that he will never separate from her ever again and would rather leave the palace if they cannot be together.

The movie ends with both of them eventually reuniting in happiness.

== Cast ==
=== Main cast ===
- Zhou Dongyu as Chenxiang
  - Zhang Zifeng as Chenxiang, young.
- Chen Xiao as Yinxiang
  - Fangyao Ziyi as Yinxiang, young.
- Zhao Liying as Liuli
  - Jiang Yiyi as Liuli, young.

=== Other cast ===
- Lu Yi as Yongzheng Emperor.
- Zhu Zixiao as Yuntang.
- Winston Chao as Kangxi Emperor.
- Vivian Wu as Empress Xiaogongren.
- Bao Bei'er as Chunshou
- Wang Shuang as Concubine Cheng

=== Guest ===
- Jess Zhang as Concubine Xuan.
- Annie Yi as Empress Xiaojingxian.
- Eva Huang as Concubine Min.
- Zhang Yameng as Concubine Hui.
- Lam Chi-chung as Yunreng.
- Kingdom Yuen as Mammy.
- Dicky Cheung as The eunuch.
- Bai Shan as Qiuniang.

== Release ==
The film had its premiere at the 16th Shanghai International Film Festival.

== Box office ==
The film grossed ¥21 million by the end of its first day of general release and grossed ¥ 48 million on its first weekend.

== Critical response ==
The film received negative reviews. It was listed on Sohu's 2013 Top Ten Bad Film.
