= Sun Feifei (actress) =

Chinese actress (born 1981)

Sun Feifei 孙菲菲
- Born: February 21, 1981 (age 45); Xi'an, Shaanxi, China
- Education: Beijing Dance Academy
- Occupation: Actress
- Spouse: Jack Shi (m. 2014)

Chinese name
- Traditional Chinese: 孫菲菲
- Simplified Chinese: 孙菲菲
Transcriptions
Standard Mandarin
- Hanyu Pinyin: Sūn Fēifēi
- Musical career
- Origin: Weifang, Shandong, China
- Label: Sun Feifei Studio

Sun Feifei (born February 21, 1981) is a Chinese actress.

== Career ==
In 1993, she started her education at the Beijing Dance Academy as a middle school student and then subsequently joined the Department of Chinese classical dance at the academy. After graduating from the academy, she chose to commence a career as an actress. In the serial Perfect Father, she portrayed a cute girl. Impressed by her lovely appearance and ingenuous temperament, the TV fans began to become acquainted with the new star. In 2009, Sun starred in a historical serial Kongque dong nan fei (孔雀东南飞), which featured a melancholy romance.

== Filmography ==
=== Film ===
Year	Title	Role	Notes
2003	Goddess of Mercy		
2006	An American in China 中国月亮	Mei	
2015	Deception Obsession		

=== Television ===
Year	Title	Role	Notes
2001	Warm Winter 冬天不冷	Deng Lu	
2001	Perfect Father 老爸百分百	Feifei	
2002	Li Wei the Magistrate II 李卫当官2	Yue Siying	
2002	The Sixth Major Crime Division 重案六组	Officer Tian Rui	
2003	Heroic Legend 萍踪侠影	Princess Jing	
2004	Seven Swordsmen 七剑下天山	Dong Xiaowan	
2004	Perfection 完美	Chen Zihuan	
2004	Beijing, My Love 北京我的爱	Yang Xue	
2005	Trail of the Everlasting Hero 侠影仙踪	Liu Yixi	
2005	Initiating Prosperity 开创盛世	Princess Yuerong	
2005	The Proud Twins 小魚兒與花無缺	Hua Yuenu	
2006	How Deep is The Love 爱有多深	Zheng Xiu	
2006	The Legend of Chu Liuxiang 楚留香传奇	Li Hongxiu	
2006	Sword Stained with Royal Blood 碧血剑	A'Jiu / Princess Changping	
2007	Call me Mama 叫一声妈妈	Yuanyue	
2008	Rose Martial World 玫瑰江湖	Shen Siru	
2010	Beauty's Rival in Palace 美人心計	Qingning	
2011	Wan Xiang		
2012	Palace II 宫锁珠帘	Empress Zhen'er	

== See also ==
- Cinema of China
