= Chen Haoyu =

Chinese singer and actress

- 陈昊宇
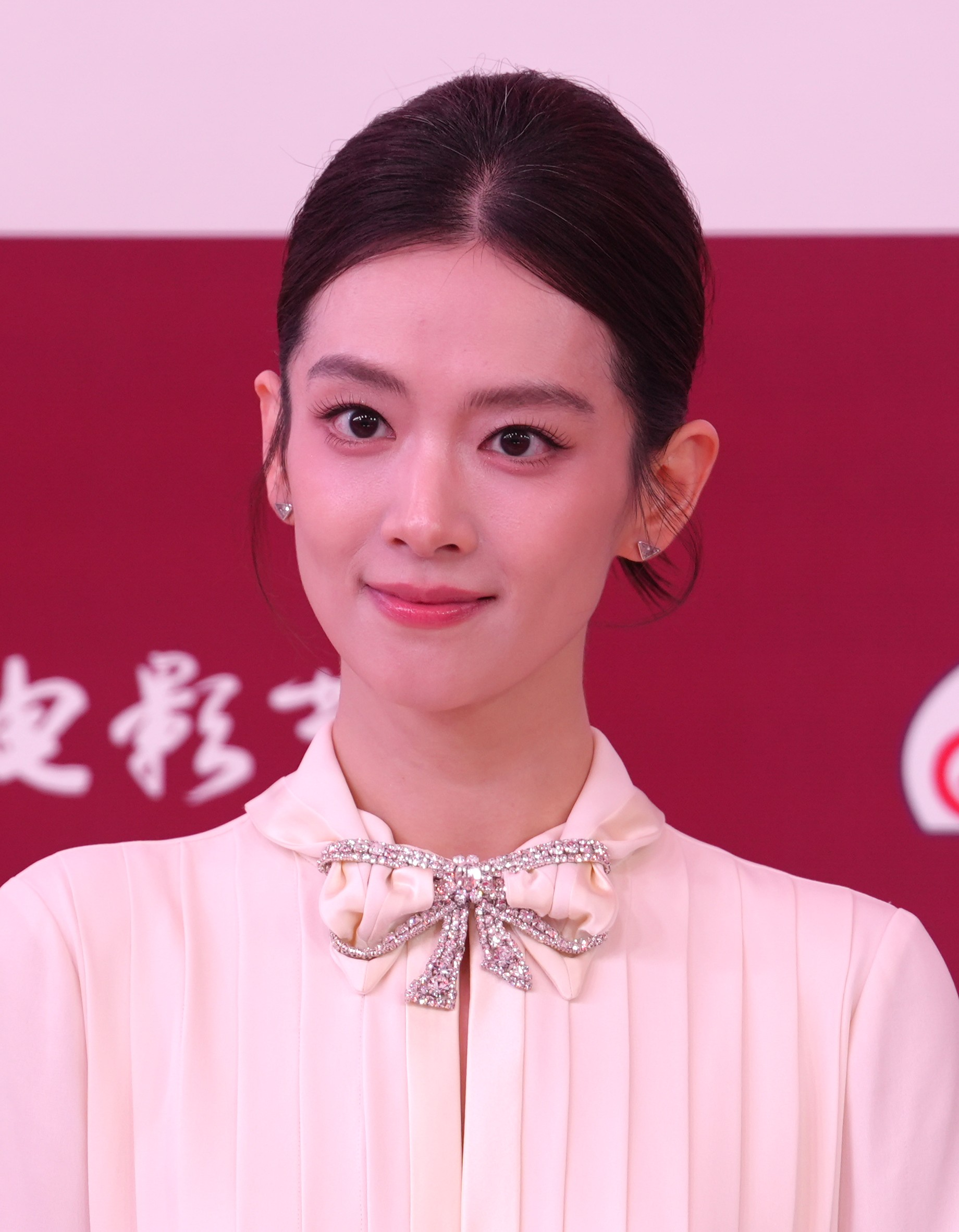
- Chen at 2026 Shanghai International Film Festival
- Born: April 7, 1992 (age 34); Fuzhou, Fujian, China
- Other name: Amy Chen
- Education: Xiamen University of Technology; Yuan Ze University
- Occupations: Actress; singer
- Years active: 2014–present
- Notable work: Ruyi's Royal Love in the Palace; I Don't Want to Be Friends With You
- Television: Ride the Wind 2024

Chinese name
- Traditional Chinese: 陳昊宇
- Simplified Chinese: 陈昊宇
Transcriptions
Standard Mandarin
- Hanyu Pinyin: Chén Hàoyǔ

Chen Haoyu (Chinese: 陈昊宇; born 7 April 1992) also known as Amy Chen is a Chinese singer and actress.

== Early life and education ==
Chen was born in Fuzhou, Fujian, on April 7, 1992. She was accepted to the Xiamen University of Technology in 2010 and two years later she went to Yuan Ze University in Taiwan on a student exchange program.

== Career ==
Chen first came to public attention in 2013 at the age of 21, appearing on Chinese Million Star Season 3 and won the championship.

Chen made her film debut in the youth romance film Summer of Meizhou (2015). The same year, she starred in the romantic comedy television series In Tale of Flower. In 2017, she co-starred in the historical television series Royal Highness.

Chen gained recognition for her role as Consort Shu in the 2018 costume television series Ruyi's Royal Love in the Palace. She also starred in the action campus drama Judo High.

In 2019, Chen starred in the fantasy historical drama Novoland: Eagle Flag.

In 2020, Chen starred in the youth romance drama I Don't Want to Be Friends With You, which received positive reviews.

In 2024, Chen participated in the 5th season of the reality show Sisters Who Make Waves, also known as Ride the Wind 2024, and was crowned the overall champion. She was dubbed as the season's dark horse.

== Filmography ==
=== Films ===
Year	English title	Chinese title	Role	Notes/Ref.
2015	Summer of Meizhou	湄洲之夏	Cheng Shuyi	
2022	Home Coming	万里归途	Zhong Ranran	
2024	Be My Friend [zh]	我才不要和你做朋友呢	Li Qingtong	
2024	The Wild Robot	荒野机器人	Rozzum Unit 7134 "Roz"	Chinese Mandarin dub
2025	A Writer's Odyssey 2	刺杀小说家2	Kong Wen's Mother	Guest Role
2026	No One Is Closer Than We [zh]	门牙	Shen Qing	

=== Television series ===
Year	English title	Chinese title	Role	Notes/Ref.
2015	In Tale of Flower	超霸花神	Jin Ye	
2016	Memory Lost Season 1	美人为馅	Zhao Manman	
2018	Judo High	热血高校	Yu Jia	
2018	Ruyi's Royal Love in the Palace	如懿传	Yehe Nara Yihuan	
2018	Royal Highness [zh]	回到明朝当王爷之杨凌传	Tang Yixian	
2018	The Sound of the Bell at Shanghai Bund [zh]	外滩钟声	Da Anan	
2019	Novoland: Eagle Flag	九州缥缈录	Bai Zhouyue	
2020	I Don't Want To Be Friends With You	我才不要和你做朋友呢	Li Qingtong	
2020	Missing Persons [zh]	失踪人口	Lu Qiao	
2021	First Love Again	循环初恋	Xia Wenxi	
2023	The Heart [zh]	问心	Chen Yue	
2023	A Journey To Love	一念关山	Chu Yue	
2024	Born to Be the One	凡人歌	Xie Meilan	
2024	Begin Again	灿烂的风和海	Mai Youge	
2025	My Doctor	我家的医生	Xu Jingxia	
2026	Wonderful Times	好好的时代	Zhuang Haohao	

=== Reality show ===
Year	English title	Chinese title	Notes
2024	Ride the Wind 2024	乘风2024	Overall Champion

== Discography ==
=== Albums ===
Year	English title	Chinese title	Tracklist	Notes/Ref.
2025	A Love Letter to Oneself	《我愛我 A Love Letter to Oneself》	1. Intro: Open Market 19; 2. 逆流 Inverted; 3. 我爱我 A Love Letter to Oneself; 4. Flavia; 5. 窗外 Oblivion; 6. 吃掉的幸福 Eaten Love; 7. 无人应答 Alone In the Silence; 8. 忘了出现 Disappeared; 9. 迷雾 The Mist; 10. 克莱因藍的独白 Klein Blue	Wrote lyrics for 5.窗外 Oblivion; 7. 无人应答 Alone In the Silence

=== Singles ===
Year	English title	Chinese title	Album	Notes/Ref.
2018	"To You in My Dreams"	给梦里的你	Judo High OST	
2018	"Memory Glow"	记忆发光	Flipped in My Youth OST	Wrote the lyrics
2020	"Red River Valley"	红河谷	Missing Persons OST	With Zhang Qi
2020	"Different"	不一样	I Don't Want to Be Friends With You OST	With Sabrina Zhaung, Zhou Yanchen, Guo Xinyu, and Wang Yimiao
2020	"Difficult Question"	难解的题	I Don't Want to Be Friends With You OST	
2020	"Love"	爱情		Original Singer: Karen Mok
2020	"Stranger'	陌生人		Original Singer: by Tanya Chua
2021	"Weightlessness Experience"	失重体验	First Love Again OST	
2021	"Stubborn"	倔强		Original Singer: Kit Chan
2024	"Colorless Flower"	无色花	Ride the Wind 2024 OST	With the rest of the cast
2024	"Don't Look Back'	别回头望	Ride the Wind 2024 OST	With the rest of the cast
2024	"Down Lies the Skeleton"	骨骼谢幕		Original Singer: Jude Chiu
2024	"Wait for Me to Enter Your World"	等我来到你的世界	Be My Friend OST	With Sabrina Zhuang
2024	"First Love"	初恋	Be My Friend OST	With Sabrina Zhuang, Wang Hao, and Bi Wenjun
2024	"Planting Flowers"	种花	The Daughters of Chinese Villagers OST	With Qi Wei, Cai Wienjing, He Jie
2024	"Yong Li Sheng Zhang"	用力生长		With Sun Yiwen, Hui Ruoqi, and Gong Li Olympic cheering song
2024	"Afloat and White"	浮生一白	White Snake: Afloat OST	With Chen Lijun
2024	"Breaking Waves"	破浪	Fantasy Westward Journey OST	Theme song for the final battle of the "Twin Dragons"
2024	"Slow Motion"	慢镜头		
2024	"Dazzling Wind and Sea"	灿烂的风和海	Begin Again OST	Wrote the lyrics
2024	"Don't Be Afraid"	别怕	Begin Again OST	Wrote the lyrics
2024	"Every Day"	每天	Begin Again OST	Original Singer: Meng Huiyuan
2025	"A Love Letter to Oneself'	我爱我		Album pre-release
2025	"Gift From a Cloud"	有朵云像你	Gift From a Cloud OST	
2025	"I See You"	看见你	Me and My Family OST	
2025	"Since When"	不知从何时起	Me and My Family OST	
2026	"Wonderful Times"	好好的年代	Wonderful Times OST	
2026	"Taste of Home"	家的味道		With Mei Ting, Tian Yu, and Li Xueqing Performance for Mango TV Spring Festival Gala
2026	"The Love of My Life"	一生中最爱	No One Is Closer Than We OST	With Zhang Yu
2026	"Run Towards the Clouds"	奔向云	The Heart Season 2 OST	
2026	"Firefly"	萤火	Prima Facie Theme Song	With Chen Jingfei
