= Xing Xiuniang =

Xing Xiuniang (Chinese: 邢秀娘 or 邢綉娘; pinyin: Xíng Xiùniáng) is depicted in some fictions as a Chinese farmer who transitioned into an opera actress. She is believed to have come from Huangmei County in Hubei Province and to have lived during either the Ming Dynasty, Qing Dynasty or Republic of China. A recent narrative suggests she also lived and performed in Jiangxi Province during the early Daoguang period (1820–1850). While some stories extol her beauty and talent, there are no written records to confirm her life's details. Furthermore, there's no evidence to validate her existence as a historical figure. The character is thought to be inspired by a real woman, Li Zicheng's wife, from the late Ming Dynasty. Stories about Xing Xiuniang have spanned nearly 300 years. The controversies in these narratives often stem from rural writers in Huangmei County, who, lacking historical expertise, adjust her age repeatedly to lend credibility to their stories. The local government of Huangmei is suspected of using this ambiguity to claim credit for Huangmei opera, which is generally believed to have originated and developed in Anqing, Anhui.

== Anecdotes ==
In 1962, researcher Gui Yuqiu (桂遇秋) collected some anecdotes about Xing Xiuniang from local tea-picking opera artists Gui Youlin (桂友林) and Mei Chongxi (梅重喜), who in turn received the stories from their seniors Luo Yunbao (罗运保), Mei Jinyu (梅金玉) and Shuai Shixin (帅师信). In 1982, a bamboo craftsmith named Gui Guangwen (桂光文) shared additional anecdotes he heard in the 1960s.

According to them, Xing Xiuniang was born in a peasant family in Dadun (大墩), Konglong, Huangmei County, Hubei. She learned tea-picking opera and lianxiang dance from her older brother and his wife. She got married, but her husband soon drowned while repairing a dam. She moved back to live with her brother's family, did farm work, and performed locally during the slow days. She played dan (female) roles, such as the Seventh Fairy and Zhu Yingtai, to great acclaim.

In the 1820s, her hometown was flooded and her brother died. Unable to survive, Xing Xiuniang, along with her sister-in-law, young nephew, and aging mother moved to northern Jiangxi Province. There she joined a local theatrical troupe (with her sister-in-law) and began performing in Duchang, Poyang, Fuliang, Jingdezhen, and other places near the Poyang Lake. She was beautiful and gifted and soon became a celebrity among the farmers and ceramic workers.

In Jingdezhen a street bully became interested in her; when Xing Xiuniang refused his advances he began to harass her. That was when Wu Rong (吳榮), a martial artist from Sichuan Province who also performed on the streets in Jingdezhen decided to intervene. Wu challenged the bully to a one-on-one fight on the bank of the Chang River and demolished him. Later, knowing that the bully would not quit easily, he escorted Xing Xiuniang and her family back to Huangmei.

Another hurdle awaited her: her local leader had arranged for her to marry a rich squire as his concubine. Wu Rong came to the rescue again: he sat in the wedding chamber in her place and when the bridegroom came in, explained to him Xing's situation and offered to donate his savings so that he could choose another bride. The squire agreed to find another concubine, while Wu Rong and Xing Xiuniang, now lovers, eventually became a couple.

== 21st century ==
It was formerly assumed that Xing Xiuniang performed tea-picking opera and daoqiang. In the 21st century, however, there has been a push by the Huangmei County government to associate her with Huangmei opera (which, though has the same name with the county in Chinese, is believed widely to have originated in neighboring Anqing around the same time).

A novel (by Zhou Zhuojie, a Huangmei native) that presents her as the first grandmaster of Huangmei opera has been made into a 2012 TV series starring Cao Xiwen as Xing. In this film, the birth year of Xing Xiuniang was moved forward around 50 years to Qianlong period. However, it is well known that Emperor Qianlong forbade women from becoming actresses. Filmed in Huangmei and partly funded by the Huangmei County government, The Legend of the Huangmei Opera Grandmaster (黃梅戲宗師傳奇) has generated anger in Anqing and professional actors.

Huangmei County has also allocated ¥1.1 billion towards a tourist site named "Xing Xiuniang Ecological Park" (邢绣娘生态园).
