= Cao Xiwen =

Chinese actress

- 曹曦文
- Born: November 16, 1983 (age 42); Jinhua, Zhejiang, China
- Education: Zhejiang Arts School; Central Academy of Drama
- Occupation: Actress
- Years active: 2001–present
- Spouse: Unknown (m. 2012; div. 2014)
- Children: 1

Cao Xiwen (Chinese: 曹曦文; pinyin: cáo Xīwén; born 16 November 1983) is a Chinese actress. She is noted for her roles as Consort Xiao and Gao Cuilan in the television series Beauty World and Journey to the West respectively.

== Early life ==
Cao was born and raised in Jinhua, Zhejiang, where she attended the Zhejiang Arts School, majoring in music and dance. Cao entered Central Academy of Drama in 2004, majoring in acting, where she graduated in 2008.

== Acting career ==
Cao made her acting debut in My World is Beautiful, Because of You (2000), playing a secretary. Cao's first film role was uncredited appearance in the film Pearl Gown (2002).

In 2001, Cao had a minor role as Ding Xiang in the wuxia television series Treasure Raiders, which starred Nicky Wu and Athena Chu.

In 2007, Cao starred in the fantasy television series The Fairies of Liaozhai, based on the novel Strange Stories from a Chinese Studio by Pu Songling.

In 2008, Cao participated in Three Kingdoms, a historical television series adapted from Luo Guanzhong's classical novel Romance of the Three Kingdoms. The series reached number one in the ratings when it aired in China. That same year, she received Huading Award nomination for Best New Actress.

In 2009, Cao played the character Gao Cuilan in Journey to the West, a shenmo television series adaptation based on the novel of the same name.

In 2010, Cao starred in the historical romance television series Beauty World.

In 2011, Cao headlined the hit drama Wild Duck. Cao was nominated for the Flying Apsaras Award for Best Actress.

In 2012, Cao reprised her role as in the Wild Duck sequel, Wild Duck 2, the series was one of the most watched ones in mainland China in that year.

== Personal life ==
Cao dated Chen Sicheng in September 2008; they split in March 2011.

In 2012, Cao was married to a Taiwanese businessman and had a daughter. They had divorced in 2014.

== Filmography ==
=== Film ===
Year	English title	Chinese title	Role	Notes	Ref.
2002	Pearl Gown	珍珠衫	Qing'er		
2008	Walking to the School	走路上学	Teacher Nie		
2008		让我为你靠点谱	Bai Ding		
2011	Lost	荒岛情未了	Xia Qi		
2011	Under the Sky of Urumqi	乌鲁木齐的天空	Jia Ruyun		
2018	Dream Breaker	破梦游戏之不醒城	Mo Lu		

=== Television series ===
Year	English title	Chinese title	Role	Notes/Ref.
2000	My World is Beautiful, Because of You	生命因你而美丽	Secretary	
2001	Sandwich Generation	上有老	Li Xiao	
2001	Woman in Hot Spring	女人汤	Huang Peiwen	
2001	Treasure Raiders	萧十一郎	Ding Xiang	
2002		省委书记		
2002		亘古奇冤		
2002	Servant Girls in the Red Mansions	红楼丫头	She Yue	
2003	The Dealer	坐庄	Huo Xi	
2003	Spring, Summer, Fall and Winter	春夏秋冬	An Ping	
2003		六女当铺	Shui Xian	
2004	Papa, Can You Hear Me Sing	搭错车	Xiao Wu	
2004	Turn Left, Turn Right	爱在左，情在右	Qiao Bei	
2004	Absolute Plan	绝对计划	Xiao Lan	
2005		麻辣婆媳	Zhong Hui	
2005	Walking Duster	行走的鸡毛掸子	San Fu	
2006	Five Star Hotel	五星大饭店	Yang Yue	
2006	When You Are Sad, Sing a Song	悲伤时唱首歌	Ming Mei	
2006	King Qian in Wuyue	吴越钱王	Wu Qiaoniang	
2007	Make a Vow	许愿树	Cheng Ying	
2007	Hong Kong Sisters	香港姊妹	Zhu Xiuling	
2007	The Fairies of Liaozhai	聊斋奇女子之侠女	Lin Yuefu	
2008	Finally Lies	秋去秋来	Su Xiaoji	
2009	Love on the Ocean	海上之恋	Sun Linlin	
2009	Chinese Style	中国式相亲	An Qi	
2009	Loves in the Boundless Land	爱在苍茫大地	Wen Ting	
2009	Good Wife and Loving Mother	贤妻良母	Zhou Xiaoxue	
2010	Journey to the West	西游记	Gao Cuilan	
2010	Three Kingdoms	三国	Lady Cai	
2010	Fate	命运	Tao Yi	
2011	Wild Duck	野鸭子	Ye Yazi	
2011	Beauty World	唐宫美人天下	Consort Xiao	
2011		大丽家的往事	Xiao Hua	
2012	Allure Snow	倾城雪	Hang Jingzhen	
2012	Flower in the War	战火中的花蕾	Shen Junyi	
2012	The Legend of the Huangmei Opera Grandmaster	黄梅戏宗师传奇	Xing Xiuniang	
2013	Wild Duck 2	野鸭子2	Ye Yazi	
2014	Bare Marriage Era	裸嫁时代	Su Xiaotang	
2014		欢喜冤家	Chen Shuangyan	
2015	Waiting for You	等你爱我	Xia Bailu	
2015	The Nanny Man	我爱男保姆	Ma Shu'er	
2015		战鼓擂	He Xiang	
2016	The 38th parallel	三八线	Wang Changfang	
2017		锦绣年华	Yao Jinxiu	
2018	Ruyi's Royal Love in the Palace	如懿传	Chen Wanyin, Noble Consort Wan	
2018	Our Glamorous Time	你和我的倾城时光	Zhu Hanqian	
2019	Legend of the Phoenix	凤弈	Zheng Shujun	
2020	Held in the Lonely Castle	清平乐	Lady Gu	Special appearance
2021	New Face	焕脸	Chen Wan	
2021	Quiet Among Disquiet	安静		
2021	A Young Couple	加油！小夫妻		
2022	Love Like the Galaxy	星汉灿烂	Consort Yue/Empress Yue	
