= Liulianzi =

Chinese novelist (born 1984)

Wu Xuelan
- 吴雪岚
- Born: October 8, 1984 (age 41); Huzhou, Zhejiang, China
- Education: Zhejiang Normal University
- Occupation: Novelist
- Writing career
- Pen name: Liu Lianzi
- Language: Chinese
- Period: 2005–present
- Genre: Novel
- Notable works: Empresses in the Palace; Ruyi's Royal Love in the Palace

Wu Xuelan (simplified Chinese: 吴雪岚; traditional Chinese: 吳雪嵐; pinyin: Wú Xuělán; born 8 October 1984), better known by her pen name Liu Lianzi (流潋紫), is a Chinese novelist. Her most well-known works are Empresses in the Palace and Ruyi's Royal Love in the Palace.

== Biography ==
Wu was born in Huzhou, Zhejiang in 1984. After graduating from Lianshi High School, she was accepted to Zhejiang Normal University. She started writing novels in 2006 and completed Empresses in the Palace in 2007, for which she won the Tencent Literature Prize of that same year. Her second novel, Ruyi's Royal Love in the Palace, was published in 2012. She joined the China Writers Association in 2013.

== Works ==
- Empresses in the Palace (Chinese: 后宫·甄嬛传)
- Ruyi's Royal Love in the Palace (Chinese: 后宫·如懿传)

== Media adaptations ==
Two of her works have been adapted into television series (in which she has made cameo appearances):

- Empresses in the Palace
- Ruyi's Royal Love in the Palace
