= Empresses in the Palace =

2011 Chinese historical series

- Also known as: The Legend of Zhen Huan
- Traditional Chinese: 後宮·甄嬛傳
- Simplified Chinese: 后宫·甄嬛传
- Hanyu Pinyin: Hòugōng Zhēn Huán Zhuàn
- Genre: Historical fiction
- Based on: Hougong Zhen Huan Zhuan by Liu Lianzi
- Written by: Liu Lianzi; Wang Xiaoping
- Directed by: Zheng Xiaolong
- Starring: Sun Li; Ada Choi; Chen Jianbin; Jiang Xin; Li Dongxue; Lan Xi; Tao Xinran
- Country of origin: China
- Original language: Mandarin
- No. of seasons: 1
- No. of episodes: 76

Production
- Running time: 45 minutes
- Production company: Beijing TV Art Center

Original release
- Network: Shaoxing News; Anhui Television; Dragon Television

Related
- Ruyi's Royal Love in the Palace (2018), Yanxi Palace (2018)

Empresses in the Palace (simplified Chinese: 后宫·甄嬛传; traditional Chinese: 後宮·甄嬛傳; pinyin: Hòugōng Zhēn Huán Zhuàn; lit. 'Inner Palace: The Legend of Zhen Huan') is a 2011 Chinese television series based on the novel of the same name by Liu Lianzi. It follows the life of Zhen Huan (played by Sun Li), from her entry into the imperial harem and her navigation of palace intrigues, to her eventual rise as Empress Dowager. In 2015, the series was condensed into a six-episode version for Netflix before moving to Amazon Prime Video.

Directed by Zheng Xiaolong, the show is acclaimed for its strong ensemble cast and sophisticated dialogue, becoming one of the most successful Chinese television dramas of all time, enjoying frequent reruns and significant cultural influence across the Chinese-speaking world.

== Plot ==
In the later years of the Kangxi Emperor's reign, then-Fourth Prince Yinzhen and his eight brothers are embroiled in a bitter power struggle for the Qing throne. With the help of powerful allies, Yinzhen becomes the Yongzheng Emperor and the brothers who fought against him are either killed or imprisoned. Despite becoming emperor, Yinzhen grows increasingly paranoid of being usurped and vows to not follow in his father's footsteps.

As a prince, Yinzhen was deeply in love with his first wife, posthumously titled Empress Chunyuan, who had died before his ascension; her younger sister became his second wife as well as the empress after his ascension. Both sisters, along with his mother, Empress Dowager Renshou, belong to the Ula-Nara clan, making them maternal relatives of Yinzhen.

Six months after his ascension to the throne, Empress Dowager Renshou organizes a selection to bring newer members into the Imperial Harem of the Yongzheng Emperor. Despite not wanting to be selected, Zhen Huan is forced to join the selection and ends up being chosen due to her resemblance to the late Empress Chunyuan. She joins the Imperial Harem alongside her childhood friend Shen Meizhuang, and the low-born An Lingrong.

Zhen Huan attempts to avoid the Imperial Harem's politics but ultimately falls in love with the Emperor, resulting in the other consorts plotting various schemes against her and Shen Meizhuang as retaliation. Due to some misunderstandings and her own sensitive and suspicious personality, as well as out of jealousy toward Zhen Huan, An Lingrong also begins plotting against her and works alongside higher-ranking imperial consorts, notably the Empress, Ula-Nara Yixiu.

While avoiding the pitfalls of such schemes, Zhen Huan befriends the neglected Fourth Prince Hongli, promising to care for him when she can. She also learns the reason behind the Emperor's favor toward her, and this disillusionment ultimately leads her to become a nun at Ganlu Temple. There, her relationship with Prince Guo secretly blossoms and the two become intimate with each other.

Despite the two planning to elope, Prince Guo is sent away to Tibet by the Emperor and presumed to be dead. Now seeking both revenge and protection, Zhen Huan convinces the Emperor to bring her back into the Imperial Harem. She takes on a new identity as Consort Xi, or Niohuru Zhenhuan, Hongli's biological mother who had supposedly spent years away from the palace praying at Ganlu Temple, and she formally adopts Hongli. With her new status, Zhenhuan gains more allies.

Prince Guo is revealed to be alive, but he and Zhenhuan have to cease their relationship now that she has returned to the Imperial Harem. Despite doing what she can to remain favored by the Emperor and distance herself from Prince Guo, the Emperor's suspicion towards their relationship escalates as time passes and Zhenhuan is ordered to kill Prince Guo but the latter commits suicide instead.

The Empress begins to lose favor as her schemes against Zhenhuan backfire and she ultimately confesses to her role in her sister's death and several other crimes. The Emperor attempts to depose her as punishment. Still, the will of the Empress Dowager, who wishes to maintain the influence of the Ula-Nara clan, forbids him from doing so; he unwillingly puts the Empress under house arrest instead.

Zhenhuan slowly poisons the Emperor and she meets with him one final time to narrate the infidelities of some of his concubines, before announcing his death.

Hongli becomes the Qianlong Emperor and Zhenhuan is granted the coveted title of empress dowager. Although the Empress should have also become an empress dowager upon the Yongzheng Emperor's death, a loophole in the previous Empress Dowager's will forces her to remain empress indefinitely instead.

Zhenhuan spends the rest of her life serving as the sole empress dowager: planning the next selection for the Imperial Harem, advising the Qianlong Emperor on state matters, and warning his imperial consorts about the consequences of harming each other.

== Cast ==
=== Main ===
Played by	Role	Introduction
Sun Li	Zhen Huan (甄嬛), Mo Chou (莫愁), later Niohuru Zhenhuan (钮祜禄·甄嬛)	Lady Zhen → First Class Attendant Wan → Noble Lady Wan → Concubine Wan → Nun → Consort Xi → Noble Consort Xi → Holy Mother Empress Dowager → Empress Dowager Chongqing → Empress Xiaoshengxian (posthumously) The titular protagonist who becomes a favored imperial consort. She is very clever, socially skilled and well-educated, and has a keen eye for strategy. She is the biological mother of Hongyan, Longyue, and Lingxi and the adoptive mother of Hongli and Jinghe.
Chen Jianbin	Aisin-Gioro Yinzhen (愛新覺羅·胤禛)	Yongzheng Emperor → Emperor Shizong (posthumously) Kangxi Emperor's fourth son. The emperor of the Qing dynasty who is still deeply in love with his first wife, Empress Chunyuan despite favoring various imperial consorts throughout the series. He is suspicious of his women due to paranoia against the Imperial Court. Died by Noble Consort Xi and Concubine Ning's revenge plot in episode 76.
Ada Choi	Ula-Nara Yixiu (烏拉那拉·宜修)	Lady Ula-Nara → Secondary Consort → Empress → Mistress of Jingren Palace → Empress Wenyu (posthumously) The true main antagonist of the series. Initially appearing to rule the Imperial Harem as a benevolent empress, her true nature is shown over time as she removes anyone favored by the Emperor who is deemed a threat to her plans, especially Zhen Huan. She's placed under house arrest after the truth of her sister's death revealed to the Emperor in episode 72. She's ultimately dies in the end of the series without any records in the history. She is Empress Chunyuan's younger half-sister and the adoptive mother of Hongshi.
—N/a	Ula-Nara Rouze (烏拉那拉·柔则)	Lady Ula-Nara → Primary Consort → Empress Chunyuan → Imperial Mother Empress Dowager → Empress Xiaojing → Empress Xiaojingxian (posthumously) Empress Chunyuan (纯元皇后) was famed for her benevolent nature and beauty, often likened to a heavenly fairy. Known in adaptations only by her childhood name “Wanwan,” she never appears directly in the series but her absence shapes the narrative of the story. As the Yongzheng Emperor’s first wife and lifelong love, she became empress after entering the palace with her pregnant sister Yixiu. Consumed by envy, Yixiu orchestrated her downfall by adulterating her food during pregnancy, leading to a stillbirth and Rouze’s death. On her deathbed, she asked the emperor to care for Yixiu, a plea that deepened his grief. Her tragic end became his greatest regret, and her memory continued to cast a lasting influence over the palace.

=== Supporting ===
==== Imperial Harem ====
Ranking System: Lady-in-waiting [Guānnǘzǐ] → Second Class Attendant [Dāyìng] (called 'Escort' in some translations) → First Class Attendant [Chángzài] → Noble Lady [Guìrén] → Concubine [Pín] → Consort [Fēi] → Noble Consort [Guìfēi] → Imperial Noble Consort [Huángguìfēi] → Empress
In the series, it is considered a huge honor to be bestowed a title rather than using one's own surname for one's rank.

Played by	Role	Introduction
Jiang Xin	Nian Shilan (年世蘭)	Consort Hua → Noble Consort Hua → Consort → Consort Hua → Second Class Attendant → Noble Consort Dunsu → Imperial Noble Consort Dunsu (posthumously) The Yongzheng Emperor's favorite consort at the beginning of the series. Due to her family's status in the Imperial Court, she is arrogant and gets away with acting impudently. She later lost the Emperor's favour definitely after her crimes were revealed to the public and her family's downfall in episode 40. Commits suicide after she learnt the truth of her favour from the Emperor inside the Cold Palace in Episode 42.
Lan Xi	Shen Meizhuang (沈眉莊)	Lady Shen → Noble Lady → Noble Lady Hui → Second Class Attendant → Noble Lady Hui → Concubine Hui → Consort Hui → Noble Consort Hui (posthumously) Zhen Huan's best friend and ally in the Imperial Harem since their childhood. After being framed by Consort Hua for faking pregnancy in episode 15, she became cold toward the Emperor. She began to serve the Empress Dowager wholeheartedly, ultimately impressing her. She eventually fell in love with Wen Shichu, her personal doctor who took care with her during the plague. Unfortunately, she died shortly after giving birth to her daughter in episode 64. She is the biological mother of Princess Jinghe.
Tao Xinran	An Lingrong (安陵容)	Lady An → Second Class Attendant → First Class Attendant → Noble Lady → Concubine → Consort Li Initially Zhen Huan's friend, she grows jealous and tries to scheme against her due to pressure from her family to win the Yongzheng Emperor's favor, as well as the manipulation of other imperial consorts. Her evil deeds were later revealed to the Emperor. She is placed under house arrest, then commits suicide after her last meeting with Zhen Huan in episode 68. Her last words would provide evidence to Zhen Huan to implicate the Empress successfully in episode 71.
Yang Fanghan	Feng Ruozhao (馮若昭)	Concubine Jing → Consort Jing → Noble Consort Jing → Dowager Noble Consort Jing A high-ranked imperial consort who is unfavored by the Yongzheng Emperor, and Zhen Huan's close friend and ally. She is the adoptive mother of Princess Longyue.
Li Yijuan	Qi Yuebin (齊月賓)	Consort Duan → Imperial Noble Consort → Dowager Imperial Noble Consort An experienced high-ranked imperial consort who is unfavored by the Yongzheng Emperor. She often gives advice to Zhen Huan and assists her in need. She is the adoptive mother of Princess Wenyi after Concubine Xiang's death since episode 42.
Zhang Yameng	Li Jingyan (李静言）	Consort Qi A high-ranked imperial consort who is unfavored by the Yongzheng Emperor due to lack of her intelligence. She befriends with Lady Fuca and she's the biological mother of Hongshi.
Chen Sisi	Cao Qinmo (曹琴默)	Noble Lady → Concubine Xiang An calculating low-ranking imperial consort. She used to work for Imperial Noble Consort Dunsu but later betrayed her after the latter's downfall. She is the biological mother of Princess Wenyi. Died by poisoning under the Emperor and Empress Dowager's command in episode 41.
Tan Songyun	Fang Chunyi (方淳意)	Lady Fang → First Class Attendant Chun → Noble Lady Chun (posthumously) The youngest imperial consort to enter the palace at the beginning of the series. Innocent and child-like, and also a loyal close friend to Zhen Huan. She's been killed by Consort Hua's command after she accidentally heard about Consort Hua's shady business in episode 27. Her death saddened Zhen Huan the most.
Cui Manli	Yu Ying'er (余鶯兒)	Palace Maid → Lady-in-waiting → Second Class Attendant → Commoner Initially a palace maid in the imperial garden, she witnesses the first encounter between the Yongzheng Emperor and Zhen Huan, and later enters the Imperial Harem by pretending to be Zhen Huan during that encounter. She soon loses the Emperor's favour after he finds out that Zhen Huan is the one he encountered. She is thrown into the Cold Palace and then strangled to death by a group of eunuchs in episode 10.
Liu Yitong	Qiao Songzhi (喬頌芝)	Senior Maid of Consort Hua → Palace Maid → Second Class Attendant Zhi Consort Hua's loyal maid who joins the Imperial Harem to consolidate the former's failing power.
Tang Yixin	Gūwalgiya Wenyuan (瓜爾佳·文鴛)	Lady Gūwalgiya → Noble Lady Qi → Concubine Qi → Noble Lady Qi → Commoner A consort who tried to accuse Zhen Huan and Wen Shichu of having an affair. After her failure in accusing Zhen Huan of having an affair, she is thrown into the Cold Palace as punishment in episode 64. Because of her offences, her family is under investigation by the Emperor, and this leads to her family's downfall. She's ultimately beaten to death by a group of guards after running away from the Cold Palace in episode 66.
Rayzha	Ye Lanyi (葉瀾依)	Lady Ye → Second Class Attendant → Noble Lady Ning → Concubine Ning A horse trainer who is forced to join the Imperial Harem after gaining the Emperor Yongzheng's attention. She commits suicide after the death of Emperor Yongzheng.
Wan Meixi	Lü Yingfeng (呂盈風)	First Class Attendant Xin → Noble Lady Xin → Concubine Xin → Dowager Concubine Xin A kind, experienced but low-ranked imperial consort who was unfavored by Emperor Yongzheng. She has often been bullied by more favoured concubines, as she's not good at gaining the Emperor's favour. She later cooperates with Zhen Huan after the latter's return to the Imperial Harem. She's ultimately became the Dowager Concubine in the end of the series, alongside with Dowager Noble Consort Jing and Zhen Huan.
Ying Er	Xia Dongchun (夏冬春)	Lady Xia → First Class Attendant An obnoxious imperial consort who picks on An Lingrong and offends Consort Hua with her brazen ways at the beginning of the series. She is punished severely and then sent to the Cold Palace in episode 3.
Zhao Qin	Fuca Yixin (富察·儀欣)	Lady Fuca → Noble Lady A scheming but cowardly imperial consort who is responsible for manipulating An Lingrong. She lost her sanity just after she just heard a story about human swines from Zhen Huan in episode 35.
Li Jiaxuan	Fei Yunyan (費雲煙)	Concubine Li A scheming and mean-spirited imperial consort who's unfavoured by the Emperor Yongzheng. She is often at odds with Zhen Huan because of her unloyal servant. She lost her sanity after being scared by a ghost, and ultimately thrown into the Cold Palace in episode 11.
Mao Xiaotong	Caiping (采蘋)	Maid → Second Class Attendant Ying → First Class Attendant Ying → Noble Lady Ying Initially a maid at Prince Guo's Mansion, she is gifted to the Yongzheng Emperor by Huanbi. She's soon been granted suicide by the Emperor after being chased by Hongshi for love in episode 70.
He Yanan	Kang Changzai (康常在)	First Class Attendant Kang She is a plain-looking, but arrogant and conceited, and has always been close to Zhen Pin. After An Lingrong suffered a miscarriage, Kang Changzai angered the Emperor by dressing flamboyantly in episode 68.
Guo Xuan	Concubine Zhen (贞嫔)	

==== Imperial Family ====
Played by	Role	Key storyline
Leanne Liu	Uya Chengbi (烏雅·成壁)	Empress Dowager Renshou → Empress Xiaogongren The Yongzheng Emperor's mother. She protects the Empress throughout the series in order to maintain the power of the Ula-Nara clan, and it is also suggested that she favours her younger son, Yunti, over the Emperor. Died for illnesses in episode 67.
Liu Yan	Yuan Yanran (阮嫣然)	Dowager Consort Shu → Master Chongjing Prince Guo's biological mother. She was the favored imperial consort of the Kangxi Emperor and became a nun after his death.
Li Dongxue	Aisin-Gioro Yunli (愛新覺羅·允禮)	Prince Guo of the Second Rank → Prince Guo of the First Rank → Prince Guoyi of the First Rank 17th son of the Kangxi Emperor, also the Yongzheng Emperor's favored younger half-brother. A free-spirited prince who did not participate in the power struggle for the throne and only indulges in literature, playing the flute and horse riding. He falls hopelessly in love with Zhen Huan. However their relationship were known by the Emperor and shortly, he commits suicide in order to protect Zhen Huan in episode 74. His death sparkled Zhen Huan's revenge to the Emperor Yongzheng in the end of the series.
Lan Yingying	Huanbi (浣碧), later Niohuru Yuyin (鈕鈷祿·玉隱)	Maid of Lady Zhen → Maid of Noble Consort Xi → Lady Niohuru → Secondary Consort of Prince Guo of the First Rank → Primary Consort of Prince Guoyi of the First Rank Zhen Huan's dowry maid and illegitimate half-sister. She later falls in love with Prince Guo and becomes his secondary consort.
Yang Qi	Meng Jingxian (孟靜嫻)	Lady Meng → Secondary Consort of Prince Guo of the First Rank Duke Pei's daughter. She is in love with Prince Guo and becomes his secondary consort. Died by poisoning by Jianqiu in episode 71.
Duan Shaonan	Aisin-Gioro Yuanche (愛新覺羅·元澈)	Eldest son of Prince Guo of the First Rank → Heir of Prince Shen of the Second Rank Prince Guo's son by Meng Jingxian. He is later adopted by Yurao and Prince Shen.
Wang Min	Aisin-Gioro Yunki (愛新覺羅·允祺)	Prince Heng of the First Rank Fifth son of Emperor Kangxi, also Yongzheng Emperor's younger half-brother.
Tan Limin	Lady Tatara (他他拉氏)	Primary Consort of Prince Heng of the First Rank
Tian Xiping	Aisin-Gioro Yun'e (愛新覺羅·允䄉)	Prince Dun of the First Rank Tenth son of Emperor Kangxi, also Yongzheng Emperor's younger half-brother, however he's been placed under house arrest after his coup d'état which he planned to place his 8th brother Yunsi as the Emperor, replacing Emperor Yongzheng by Nian Gengyao's forces, failed in episode 39.
Tian Pujun	Lady Borjigin (孛兒只斤氏)	Primary Consort of Prince Dun of the First Rank, although she helps Zhen Huan sometimes, she was reduced as a commoner after her husband's conviction by the Emperor in episode 40.
Kang Fuzhen	Aisin-Gioro Yunxi (愛新覺羅·允禧)	Prince Shen of the Third Rank → Prince Shen of the Second Rank 21st son of the Emperor Kangxi, also the Yongzheng Emperor's another younger half-brother. He marries Yurao, Zhen Huan's youngest sister.
Xu Lu	Zhen Yurao (甄玉娆), later Niohuru Yurao (钮钴禄·玉娆)	Lady Zhen → Lady Niohuru → Primary Consort of Prince Shen of the Second Rank Zhen Huan's youngest sister. Despite catching the attention of the Yongzheng Emperor, she falls in love with and marries Prince Shen.
Wu Lipeng	Aisin-Gioro Hongshi (愛新覺羅·弘時)	Third Prince Consort Qi's son. He is later adopted by the Empress. Despite being the eldest surviving imperial prince as well as being a legitimate son, he is not favored by his father due to his lack of intelligence and awareness.
Wang Wenjie	Aisin-Gioro Hongli (愛新覺羅·弘曆)	Fourth Prince → Prince Bao of the First Rank → Qianlong Emperor Originally neglected as a result of being born to a palace maid from the Imperial Gardens, he is later adopted by Zhen Huan and registered as her biological son. He devotes himself to studying and later impresses his father. He ultimately succeeds his father and becomes the Emperor Qianlong at the end of the series.
Yuan Yi	Lady Fuca (富察氏)	Lady Fuca → Primary Consort of Prince Bao of the First Rank → Empress Hongli's primary consort. She is chosen by Zhen Huan.
Zhang Yan	Ula-Nara Qingying (烏拉那拉·青櫻)	Lady Ula-Nara → Secondary Consort of Prince Bao of the First Rank → Consort Xian The Empress's niece. Originally a candidate for Hongshi's consort selection, she is rejected due to being rude toward Longyue. Out of anger, the Empress bestows her as a secondary consort to Hongli.
Duan Shaonan	Aisin-Gioro Hongyan (愛新覺羅·弘曕)	Sixth Prince → Heir of Prince Guo of the First Rank Zhen Huan's son by Prince Guo. He is Lingxi's twin brother.
Yao Wan'er	Aisin-Gioro Wenyi (愛新覺羅·温宜)	Noble Lady Cao's daughter. She is later adopted by Consort Duan.
Yang Xinyi	Aisin-Gioro Longyue (愛新覺羅·朧月)	Zhen Huan's eldest daughter. She is adopted by Consort Jing since her birth in episode 45.
Ding Xiaomei	Aisin-Gioro Lingxi (愛新覺羅·靈犀)	Zhen Huan's daughter by Prince Guo. She is Hongyan's twin sister.
Zhang Zhixiang	Aisin-Gioro Jinghe (愛新覺羅·靜和)	Shen Meizhuang's daughter by Wen Shichu. She is adopted by Zhen Huan.

==== Imperial Court ====
Played by	Role	Introduction
Wang Biao	Zhang Tingyu (张廷玉)	A minister proven to be loyal only to the Yongzheng Emperor.
Zhang Yi	Tunggiya Longkodo (佟佳·隆科多)	Emperor Yongzheng's maternal uncle, and the Empress Dowager's lover during their youth. A military general who greatly helped the Yongzheng Emperor in the fight for the throne. Died by poisoning under the Emperor's command during his time under house arrest in episode 49.
Shen Baoping	Zhen Yuandao (甄远道), later Niohuru Yuandao (钮钴禄·远道)	Zhen Huan's father.
Li Dan	Yun Xinluo (云辛萝)	Zhen Huan's mother.
Ma Weifu	Gūwalgiya Emin (瓜尔佳·鄂敏)	Concubine Qi's father. An ambitious, cunning and corrupt minister who have maliciously framed Zhen Huan's father for sympathizing the political prisoners in episode 45. After Zhen Huan's return and his daughter was banished to the Cold Palace for framing Zhen Huan and Wen Shichu for having an affair, his crimes including his corruption has been revealed to the Emperor. He's soon being imprisoned and commits suicide in prison in episode 66.
Sun Ning	Nian Gengyao (年羹尧)	Consort Hua's older brother and the Yongzheng Emperor's leading general. He's later lost the Emperor's trust due to his relationship with Prince Dun, and later commits suicide under the Emperor's command in episode 40.
Li Hongrui	Moge (摩格)	Khan of the Dzungar Khanate.
Xing Hanqing	Ji Weisheng (季惟生)	Assistant director of the Imperial Bureau of Astronomy.
Liu Boting	A'jin (阿晋)	Prince Guo's personal attendant.
Sun Boyang	Xia Yi (夏刈)	Head of the Yongzheng Emperor's personal group of assassins. Killed by Zhen Huan's command in episode 76.

==== Servants ====
Played by	Role	Introduction
Lee Tien-chu	Su Peisheng (苏培盛)	The Yongzheng Emperor's head eunuch since the latter's youth. He eventually marries Jinxi. He shall be retired after the latter's death.
Li Lubing	Xiao Xiazi (小厦子)	The Yongzheng Emperor's eunuch and Su Peisheng's disciple.
Sun Qian	Cui Jinxi (崔槿汐)	Zhen Huan's fiercely loyal senior maid. She ultimately falls in love with Su Peisheng and becomes his wife.
Zhan Jingyi	Liuzhu (流朱)	Zhen Huan's dowry maid. A fiercely loyal maid and a protector to Zhen Huan, she always teach those servants who disrespects her mistress a lesson to protect her mistress' dignity. When Zhen Huan lost the Emperor's favour under the Empress' schemes and placed under house arrest, which have worsen her health since episode 43, she was killed by a guard's sword in episode 44, just for seeking a doctor for her mistress.
Luo Kang	Xiao Yunzi (小允子)	Zhen Huan's head eunuch who's been loyal to her since she sent Wen Shichu to heal his brother who's also a eunuch but working in different departments.
Zhai Beibei	Pei'er (佩兒)	Zhen Huan's maid who later serves Concubine Xin, but remains loyal to her former mistress.
Zhao Hailong	Kang Luhai (康祿海)	Zhen Huan's head eunuch to Concubine Li's service.
Guo Zihao	Xiao Yinzi (小印子)	Zhen Huan's eunuch who moves to Concubine Li's service. Under Yu's command, he's been caught by Zhen Huan's eunuches when he sneak into Zhen Huan's palace then executed by the Emperor's order in episode 10.
He Mengting	Huasui (花穗)	Originally in the service of Yu Ying'er, she later becomes Zhen Huan's maid. Under Yu's command, she's been caught when she tried to poison Zhen Huan then executed by the Emperor's order in episode 10.
Li Qun	Bin'er (玢兒)	A maid at Zhen Mansion, and later at Gūwalgiya Mansion.
Cheng Nan	Feiwen (斐雯)	Zhen Huan's maid. After she failed to accuse her mistress alongside with Concubine Qi, she's been executed in episode 63.
Li Yang	Xu Jinliang (徐進良)	The eunuch who manages the Yongzheng Emperor's sleeping arrangements.
Du Xiang	Huang Guiquan (黃規全)	The first director of the Imperial Household Department who is distantly related to Consort Hua. Sly and cunning, he often gave the unbalanced stipends to them according to their favour from the Emperor, he's soon been setup by Zhen Huan and been dismissed in episode 15.
Zhang Zhiwei	Jiang Zhongmin (姜忠敏)	The second director of the Imperial Household Department. Originally as the deputy director of the Imperial Housing Department, he's been promoted after his supervisor Huang Guiquan has been dismissed and been sent to hard labour as the punishment for mistreating Zhen Huan and the other unfavoured concubines in episode 16. A diligent and responsible eunuch, he often informs the Emperor to make sure the work wouldn't get wrong. However, he knew too much of the Empress' dirty deeds, he's been setup by sending the Empress Chunyuan's dress to Zhen Huan which causing her to lost the Emperor's favour and he's been executed by the Emperor in episode 43.
Quan Baojun	Chief Gou (苟總管)	The third director of the Imperial Household Department. A mean, harsh senior eunuch who often mistreats the unfavoured concubines badly, including Zhen Huan, he's soon been dismissed and executed by the Emperor after the death of Liuzhu in episode 44.
Zhang Zhiwei	Liang Duorui (梁多瑞)	The fourth director of the Imperial Household Department.
Liang Yixin	Baojuan (寶鵑)	An Lingrong's senior maid who assists her to scheme against the other concubines including Zhen Huan. She's been executed after her mistress' evil deeds were all revealed to the Emperor in episode 68.
Hu Xinhui	Baoque (寶鵲)	An Lingrong's maid. She's been executed after she told Shen Meizhuang about the conspiracy orchestrated by Concubine Qi which disrupted her pregnancy in episode 64.
Li Mengyang	Juqing (菊青)	Originally a maid in the service of Zhen Huan, she is later sent to An Lingrong. Died by poisoning by An Lingrong after she's been suspected by her new mistress for being a spy for Zhen Huan.
Xu Lei	Xiao Guizi (小貴子)	A eunuch working for An Lingrong.
Liu Yin	Jixiang (吉祥)	Consort Duan's senior maid.
Han Yuting	Cuiguo (翠果)	Consort Qi's maid.
Tian Shumei	Sun Zhuxi (孫竹息)	The Empress Dowager's senior maid.
Yang Jingfang	Fangruo (芳若)	Originally a maid in the service of the Yongzheng Emperor, she later moves to the Empress Dowager. She is also the guidance maid to Zhen Huan and An Lingrong upon their selection as imperial consorts.
Yang Kaichun	Jianqiu (剪秋)	The Empress's trusted senior maid. She tries to poison Zhen Huan but poisoned Meng Jingxian instead.
Li Yingya	Huichun (繪春)	The Empress's maid.
Liu Yang	Jiang Fuhai (江福海)	The Empress's head eunuch. After Jianqiu's failed attempt to poison Zhen Huan, he's been caught by the Department of Penalty under the Emperor's command, he's soon later confesses everything all about his mistress' evil deeds, including the truth of the Empress Chunyuan's death in episode 72.
Wang Yiming	Zhou Ninghai (周寧海)	Consort Hua's capable head eunuch who helps her in many schemes. He's been caught in the Department of Penalty after his mistress' downfall then been executed in episode 40.
Wang Xiaoming	Suxi (肅喜)	A eunuch working for Consort Hua. He's been caught with evidence after he set the fire in Zhen Huan's palace in episode 42.
Sun Fei	Fuzi (福子)	A palace maid sent to spy on Consort Hua by the Empress. Killed by Zhou Ninghai in episode 2.

==== Imperial Physicians ====
Played by	Role	Introduction
Zhang Xiaolong	Wen Shichu (温实初) (Note: Actor Zhang Xiaolong also served behind the scenes as the drama's expert regarding traditional dance and Qing court etiquette.)	Zhen Huan's childhood friend and most trusted imperial physician.
Qin Yiming	Wei Lin (卫临)	Wen Shichu's disciple and the subsequent head imperial physician.
Huang Ningsheng	Zhang Mi (章弥)	An imperial physician who supervises Zhen Huan's first pregnancy. Resigns and retired after Zhen Huan's first miscarriage in episode 30.
Du Xiaotao	Jiang Cheng (江诚)	Brother of Jiang Shen. He works for Consort Hua. Killed by the Emperor's command in episode 27.
Yang Xiaobo	Jiang Shen (江慎)	Brother of Jiang Cheng. He works for Consort Hua. Killed by the Emperor's command in episode 27.
Guo Chen	Liu Ben (刘畚)	An imperial physician who is ordered by Consort Hua and Noble Lady Cao to win Shen Meizhuang's trust during their stay at the Imperial Gardens. After Shen's fake pregnancy scandal exposes, he's escaped from the capital but later been caught by Zhen Huan's command in episode 23.

==== Ganlu Temple ====
Played by	Role	Introduction
Hai Yan	Jing'an (静岸)	Head Nun of Ganlu Temple, she is soft-hearted and often manipulated by Jingbai.
Zhao Qianzi	Jingbai (静白)	Only second to the Head Nun, she uses her authority to abuse and humiliate Zhen Huan during her stay at Ganlu Temple.
Wang Lihan	Moyan (莫言)	A straightforward nun who often berates but helps Zhen Huan and defies Jingbai's orders.

==== Special appearance ====
Played by	Role	Introduction
Liu Lianzi	Liu Lianzi (刘莲子)	One of the candidates of the Imperial Selection in the first episode. The character served as a cameo for the original author. Most of the scenes outlining her character profile were deleted from the final cut, but were shown during the author's own wedding.

== Soundtrack ==
Empresses in the Palace – Original Soundtrack (后宫·甄嬛传电视剧原声音乐大碟)
No.	Title	Music	Length
1.	"Plight of a Beauty (红颜劫)"	Yao Beina
2.	"Bodhisattva (菩萨蛮)" (Male version sung by Liu Huan)	Yao Beina
3.	"Flying Phoenix (凤凰于飞)"	Liu Huan
4.	"Picking Lotus (采莲)"	Yao Beina
5.	"Golden Silk Blouse (金缕衣)"	Yao Beina
6.	"Jinghong Dance (惊鸿舞)"	Yao Beina

== Production ==
- Publisher: Zheng Xiaolong, Zhong Yi, Dun Yong, Li Ruigang
- Producer: Cao Ping, Dun Qi, Xu Xiaoou
- Supervisor: Liu Zhiyuan, Wang Xiaodong, Zhang Suzhou, Chen Liang, Tang Rang, Zhang Ping, Li Junming, Zhang Ping, Zhao Hongmei, Chen Yaping
- Director: Zheng Xiaolong
- Assistant director: Dong Xiaoyun, Liu Le, Zheng Hanqing
- Screenwriter: Liu Lianzi, Wang Xiaoping
- Photographer: Li Zhiqiang, Li Qiang, Yu Fei, Zhang Yuanshou, Feng Yucheng, Wang Lindong, Zhao Hao, He Lichun, Chen Jianwei, Wei Liangliang, Li Meng, Yang Jinbo
- Music: Liu Huan, Meng Ke, Ding Ji, Zhao Liang, Song Lei, Wang Songyang, Wan Xiaoyuan, Li Wei, Sui Jing, Asian Philharmonic Orchestra, Huang Lijie
- Editor: Jin Ye, Jiang Jimei, cao translation
- Props: Wang Yue, Liu Yuanfei, Wang Guiqing, Wang Shili, Gao Guiyong, Liu Jiye, Zhang Yanlong, Fang Jie, LiBiao, Cao Yongli, Wang Yanhua, Su Huizhi, Gao Yashi, Gao Xian, Lv Qiang, Zhang Fengjun
- Casting: Li Yang
- Voice acting: Liao Jing, Zhang Wei
- Art: Chen Haozhong, Luan Hexin, Wang Yongkang, Yang Kun
- Modeling: Chen Minzheng, Li Yuanyuan, Wang Yingkai, Kou Hainan, Yang Jia, Sun Yue, Guo Yang, Min Cong, Zhang Rongbin, Qin Yiping, Wen Lulu, Xing Lu
- Wardrobe: Chen Tongxun, Shi Dongling, Ji Doni, Zhu Yuxiang, Tang Biyun, Liu Xiaohu, Chen Guanglin, Guo Sheng, Shi Jianmin
- Visual effects: Beijing Huacai Shengtang Mathematics Technology Co., LTD
- Lighting: Li Tianlei, Zhang Xin'an, Zhang Cun, Wang Zhonghai, Xu Wanfei, Zhang Feng, Lin Shucong, Wu Tianzhao, Zhang Yunling, Meng Xudong, Chen Guofu, Xu Bing, Zhang Jiayu
- Recording: An Wei, Liu Xinghe, Lin Xin
- Script supervisor: Guo Guanhua, Yu Feng
- Issuing: Cheng Ting

== Impact ==
Chinese traditional arts

According to the Overseas Chinese Language and Culture Education Online website, the "Filigree Inlaid Metal Art" (花丝镶嵌), an accessory craft skill that can be traced back to the Spring and Autumn period became a phenomenon due to being featured in the series.

Donkey medicine

A traditional remedy derived from donkey-hide gelatin (东阿阿胶, Dong-E-E-Jiao) had its profile increased through product placement in the show.

== Ratings ==
Ratings on Anhui Television and Dragon Television
Broadcast date	Episode	CSM42 City Anhui Television ratings			CSM42 City Dragon Television ratings		
Broadcast date	Episode	Ratings	Audience share	Rank	Ratings	Audience share	Rank
March 26, 2012	1–2	0.813	2.17	3	0.601	1.61	8
March 27, 2012	3–4	0.959	2.57	3	0.677	1.82	5
March 28, 2012	5–6	0.854	2.22	3	0.727	1.88	6
March 29, 2012	7–8	1.058	2.75	3	0.844	2.19	5
March 30, 2012	9–10	1.087	2.72	3	0.930	2.32	4
March 31, 2012	11–12	1.005	2.67	3	0.894	2.37	4
April 1, 2012	13–14	1.080	2.85	3	0.910	2.41	4
April 2, 2012	15–16	1.097	2.98	2	1.018	2.77	4
April 3, 2012	17–18	1.008	2.76	3	1.036	2.86	2
April 4, 2012	19–20	1.110	2.91	2	1.050	2.75	3
April 5, 2012	21–22	1.105	2.95	2	1.081	2.88	3
April 6, 2012	23–24	1.090	2.83	2	1.009	2.63	3
April 7, 2012	25–26	1.281	3.30	1	1.035	2.67	4
April 8, 2012	27–28	1.147	2.90	3	1.233	3.12	2
April 9, 2012	29–30	1.332	3.46	2	1.315	3.42	3
April 10, 2012	31-32	1.309	3.49	1	1.174	3.12	2
April 11, 2012	32–34	1.428	3.76	1	1.296	3.41	2
April 12, 2012	35–36	1.407	3.68	1	1.272	3.32	2
April 13, 2012	37–38	1.377	3.66	1	1.262	3.36	2
April 14, 2012	39–40	1.411	3.73	1	1.189	3.18	2
April 15, 2012	41–42	1.330	3.32	1	0.897	2.29	4
April 16, 2012	43–44	1.422	3.80	1	1.294	3.45	2
April 17, 2012	45–46	1.519	4.06	1	1.410	3.78	2
April 18, 2012	47–48	1.571	4.02	1	1.416	3.76	2
April 19, 2012	49–50	1.625	4.28	1	1.513	3.99	2
April 20, 2012	51–52	1.567	4.03	1	1.552	4.00	2
April 21, 2012	53–54	1.652	4.43	1	1.570	4.23	2
April 22, 2012	55–56	1.562	4.16	1	1.512	4.00	2
April 23, 2012	57–58	1.687	4.23	1	1.444	3.82	2
April 24, 2012	59–60	1.760	4.54	1	1.618	4.18	2
April 25, 2012	61–62	1.753	4.68	1	1.609	4.30	2
April 26, 2012	63–64	1.954	5.37	1	1.570	4.37	2
April 27, 2012	65–66	1.720	4.59	1	1.670	4.47	2
April 28, 2012	67–68	1.806	4.79	1	1.684	4.48	2
April 29, 2012	69–70	1.878	5.21	1	1.525	4.25	2
April 30, 2012	71–72	1.853	5.15	1	1.696	4.75	2
May 1, 2012	73–74	1.770	4.68	1	1.710	4.52	2
May 2, 2012	75–76	2.11	5.75	1	2.063	5.60	2
Average ratings		1.480	3.89	2012: 14th	1.340	3.53	2012: 23rd

- Highest ratings are marked in red, lowest ratings are marked in blue.

== Accolades ==
List of Accolades
Award	Category	Recipient(s)	Result
China TV Golden Eagle Awards	Outstanding Television Series	Empresses in the Palace	Won
International Emmy Award	Best Actress	Sun Li	Nominated
Shanghai Television Festival	Best Director	Zheng Xiaolong	Won
Shanghai Television Festival	Best Actress	Sun Li	Nominated
China TV Drama Awards	Best Television Series	Empresses in the Palace	Won
China TV Drama Awards	Best Director	Zheng Xiaolong	Won
China TV Drama Awards	Best Actress	Sun Li	Won
China TV Drama Awards	Best Supporting Actress	Jiang Xin	Won
China TV Drama Awards	Best New Actor	Li Dongxue	Won
China TV Drama Awards	Most Popular Actress (Hong Kong/Taiwan)	Ada Choi	Won
Macau International Television Festival	Best Drama	Empresses in the Palace	Won
Macau International Television Festival	Best Director	Zheng Xiaolong	Won
Macau International Television Festival	Best Actress	Sun Li	Won
Huading Awards	Best TV Actor	Chen Jianbin	Won
Chunyan Awards	Best Director	Zheng Xiaolong	Won
China Hengdian Film and Television Festival	Best Television Series	Empresses in the Palace	Won
China Hengdian Film and Television Festival	Best Director	Zheng Xiaolong	Won

== International broadcast ==
The series first aired in China in 2011 on Shaoxing News, a regional channel. As it gained popularity there it was picked up by national television channels and first aired nationwide in 2012.

In April 2015, the series was added to Netflix US and has since been taken off and put on Amazon Prime Video. It was edited down to six episodes, each with a 90-minute duration. The original audio was kept intact with the addition of closed captions in English.

In Thailand, the series was first aired in 2016 on Channel 7 and in 2018 on One31 and LINE TV.

The series was uploaded on YouTube by LeTV in 2018.
