= Consort Ning =

Consort of Yongzheng Emperor (died 1734)

- Died: 25 June 1734; Forbidden City
- Burial: Tai Mausoleum, Western Qing tombs
- Spouse: Yongzheng Emperor (m. 1733)
Posthumous name
- Consort Ning (寧妃)
- House: Wu (武; by birth); Aisin Gioro (by marriage)
- Father: Wu Zhuguo (武柱国)

Consort Ning
- Traditional Chinese: 寧妃
- Simplified Chinese: 寧妃
Transcriptions
Standard Mandarin
- Hanyu Pinyin: Níng Fēi

Consort Ning (Chinese: 寧妃; pinyin: Níng Fēi; died 25 June 1734), of the Han Chinese Bordered Yellow Banner Wu clan, was a consort of the Yongzheng Emperor.

== Life ==
=== Family background ===
Consort Ning was a member of the Han Chinese Bordered Yellow Banner Wu clan. It was said that the Wu clan descended from the Ming dynasty. Her personal name was Lingyuan (令媛). The family came from Shanxi.

- Father: Wu Zhuguo (武柱国), served as magistrate of Taizhou (Chinese: 泰州知州; pinyin: Tàizhōu zhīzhōu).
- Elder brother: Wu Qixin (武启欣)

=== Yongzheng era ===
In 1733, Lady Wu entered the Forbidden City after the Elegant Women selection, and was given the title of "Concubine Ning" (宁嫔; "ning" meaning "calm", "tranquil"). The selection was set in the third lunar month, unlike in previous years, when it was set in twelfth lunar month. In 1734, she was supposed to be promoted to Consort Ning (宁妃). Lady Wu died before the promotion ceremony and was given a funeral befitting a consort. Her funeral ceremony was similar to the funeral of the Kangxi Emperor's Consort Liang. After her death, her eldest brother, Wu Qixin, was relocated to the capital, and was permitted to preserve Consort Ning's belongings, including two satin bed covers with spring flowers ornament, one pillow and three satin sheets.

Consort Ning's coffin was interred in the Tai Mausoleum in the Western Qing tombs.

== Titles ==
- During the reign of the Yongzheng Emperor (r. 1722–1735):
  - Concubine Ning (宁嫔; from 1733), fifth rank consort
  - Consort Ning (宁妃; from 1735), fourth rank consort

== In fiction and popular culture ==
- Portrayed by Rayzha Alimjan in the 2011 TV series Empresses in the Palace as Ye Lanyi, Concubine Ning (叶澜依).
- Portrayed by Sun Xi in the 2016 movie "Fragrance of the beauty" (美人香) as Wu Ci'en, Noble Lady Ning (武慈恩).

== See also ==
- Ranks of imperial consorts in China#Qing
- Royal and noble ranks of the Qing dynasty
