= Ruyi's Royal Love in the Palace =

2018 Chinese historical series

- Promotional poster
- Also known as: The Legend of Ruyi
- Traditional Chinese: 如懿傳
- Simplified Chinese: 如懿传
- Hanyu Pinyin: Rúyì Zhuàn
- Genre: Historical fiction; Romance
- Based on: Inner Palace: The Legend of Ruyi (后宫·如懿传) by Liu Lianzi (流潋紫)
- Written by: Liu Lianzi
- Directed by: Wang Jun
- Starring: Zhou Xun; Wallace Huo
- Country of origin: China
- Original language: Mandarin
- No. of seasons: 1
- No. of episodes: 87

Production
- Executive producer: Huang Lan
- Production locations: Hengdian World Studios; Beijing; Wulan Butong; Mudu
- Production company: New Classics Media

Original release
- Network: Tencent Video; Dragon TV; Jiangsu Television
- Release: August 20 – October 15, 2018

Related
- Empresses in the Palace

Ruyi's Royal Love in the Palace (Chinese: 如懿传; pinyin: Rúyì Zhuàn) is a 2018 Chinese television series based on the novel by Liu Lianzi. Starring Zhou Xun and Wallace Huo, it chronicles the marital relationship between the Qianlong Emperor and Empress Nara. The series aired on Tencent Video from August 20 to October 15, 2018; during which it was streamed more than 18.9 billion times. It later went on national broadcast and aired simultaneously on Jiangsu Television and Dragon TV from December 25, 2018.

The highly anticipated sequel to the popular Empresses in the Palace, the drama's release and plot were affected by Chinese censorship, and it was ultimately a critical disappointment. It generated controversy over the lead actors' pay, its underlying values, and allegations of plagiarism, though it was praised for its elaborate props and lavish sets. In January 2019, after Beijing Daily criticized palace-intrigue dramas for their negative influence, the series was temporarily removed from the Chinese stream service. It was again removed in China on 27 September 2020.

== Synopsis ==
The story follows Empress Nara and her life during the Qianlong Emperor's reign.

Originally known as Ula Nara Qingying, the niece of Empress Ula Nara, she is childhood friends with Fourth Prince Hongli and initially chosen to be his primary consort. However, when the Yongzheng Emperor exposes Empress Ula Nara for her role in helping Third Prince Hongshi become a usurper, Hongli is forced to rescind his decision, taking Fuca Langhua as his primary consort instead. Qingying is banished from the imperial palace upon Empress Ula Nara's house arrest. Hongli compromises with the Yongzheng Emperor and is allowed to take Qingying as a secondary consort in exchange for also taking Gao Xiyue as a mistress.

All three women are promoted once Hongli ascends to the throne as the Qianlong Emperor; Qingying becomes Consort Xian, Langhua becomes the empress and Xiyue becomes Noble Consort Hui.

Due to her connection to the Ula Nara clan and her reputation as the Emperor's most favored woman, Consort Xian is not well received in the harem and imperial family. Empress Dowager Chongqing initially distrusts Consort Xian but grants her the name "Ruyi" once trust is later established.

Threatened by Ruyi's favor, Empress Fuca, Noble Consort Hui and her maid A'ruo conspire against her, resulting in Ruyi being blamed for the deaths of imperial heirs. She is demoted and sent to the Cold Palace where the truth about her infertility surfaces and where she forms a friendship with lowly imperial guard Ling Yunche. Ruyi is able to return to the harem with the help of her allies. A'ruo is then banished to the Cold Palace, Noble Consort Hui is abandoned by Empress Fuca and Empress Fuca is isolated from her allies.

Devastated by the deaths of her two sons and forced to marry her only daughter off to Mongolian allies, Empress Fuca falls into water during winter and nearly drowns. On her deathbed, the Emperor confronts her for her evil deeds. In return, she curses his future empress to endure his coldness until her death.

It is revealed that the late Empress and Noble Consort Hui were both manipulated by Consort Jia, a foreign consort who wants to win the love of the head of her tribe. Ruyi's elevation from noble consort to imperial noble consort to step-empress is made uneasy due to Consort Jia's curbing her favor with scathing rumors and an attempt to frame her for adultery. Furthermore, she rallies her maiden tribe and well-known noblewomen to convince the Emperor to name her eldest son as crown prince. Eventually, Consort Jia loses favor and is demoted to a commoner. On her deathbed, to have her confess to her crimes, Ruyi reveals to her that the head of her tribe exposed the fact that she isn't a noblewoman, which is why he never loved her. Ruyi is unaware that Consort Jia's downfall is due to the scheming of the unfavored Consort Ling.

Consort Ling, a former maid who looks similar to Ruyi begins rising in power. Driven by spite against those who had wronged her and financially pressured by her family, Consort Ling grows in favor due to constantly feeding into the Emperor's wants over his needs. Ruyi's differing opinions for his health and reputation begin to clash with his expectations and desires, causing a dramatic decline in their relationship.

Ultimately, a confrontation between them causes Ruyi to cut her hair as a means of symbolically ending their marriage and rescinding her status as empress. This act is seen as a curse against the emperor and empress dowager.

After being promoted to the rank of imperial noble consort, Consort Ling continually offends the Mongolian imperial consorts and abuses her power obnoxiously. Ruyi refuses to be treated for tuberculosis and collects evidence of Consort Ling's crimes. Consort Ling's life comes to an end when her crimes are exposed to the Emperor and she is punished to drink poison daily until her dying day.

Though no longer under house arrest, Ruyi refuses to be involved with the harem and doesn't accept her role as empress. While the Emperor is on a hunt at the Mulan Hunting Grounds, Ruyi finally succumbs to her illness without anyone's knowledge. Despite greatly mourning her death, the Emperor only grants her a small funeral, refuses to give her a posthumous name, orders all records of her to be destroyed and her death to be recorded as merely the passing of an untitled clanswoman. This brings controversy throughout the country and the imperial palace. When the Empress Dowager asks about his decision, he justifies his act by recounting how Ruyi had cut her hair in defiance and how his order was her eternal punishment, but he also explains his wish to free her of the empress title in death. The Emperor spends the rest of his life being haunted by her memory.

A now elderly Emperor cuts a piece of his whitened hair and places it beside the original lock of dark hair that Ruyi had cut in front of him years ago. After the passing of the Emperor, a dead prunus mume plant once nurtured by Ruyi begins to blossom.

The ending sequence states that no woman from the Ula Nara clan entered the harem after Ruyi's death.

== Cast ==
=== Main ===
==== Leading protagonists ====
| Actor | Character | Residence | Introduction |
|---|---|---|---|
| Zhou Xun | Ula Nara Qingying/Ruyi (乌拉那拉·青樱/如懿) | Prince Bao's Mansion; Yanxi Palace; Yikun Palace | Step-Empress Nara (那拉继后); Lady Ula Nara (格格) → Secondary Consort (侧福晋) → Consort Xian (娴妃) → Noble Lady Xian (娴贵人) → Commoner (庶人) → Consort Xian (娴妃)→ Noble Consort Xian (娴贵妃) → Imperial Noble Consort (皇贵妃) → Empress (皇后) → Mistress of Yikun Palace (翊坤宫娘娘) Childhood sweethearts with the Qianlong Emperor, she is initially chosen to be his primary consort before her family's reputation is compromised. Her real name is Qingying, until she is granted the name Ruyi by the Empress Dowager, meaning "beautiful and quiet", to remind her that she must be calm if she wants to have a peaceful life in the palace. Due to her deep relationship with the Qianlong Emperor, she is despised by the women of the harem and suffers trials and tribulations as a result. Ruyi survives through these challenges with her strength and determination, as well as the help of her closest friends. She loves Qianlong sincerely and she desires no favor or power from him, just to be by his side. The great love between them begins to weaken as years pass and Ruyi is dragged by the multiple calculations in the palace, making the Emperor suspicious of her and she becomes disappointed in him. After a big argument, Ruyi cuts her hair in front of Qianlong, which is taken as a great offense and it prompts him to lock up Ruyi and depose her from the Empress seat. During her confinement she is diagnosed with tuberculosis and the physician tells her she will die soon. Later her injustice is revealed and Qianlong restores her position as Empress, but she rejects it and dies shortly after. |
| Wallace Huo | Aisin Gioro Hongli (爱新觉罗·弘历) | Prince Bao's Mansion; Yangxin Hall | Emperor Gaozong of Qing (清高宗); Fourth Prince (四阿哥) → Prince Bao of the First Rank (宝亲王) → Qianlong Emperor (乾隆帝) → Emperor Emeritus (太上皇) He is the fourth son of the Yongzheng Emperor and keeps a tense relationship with his adoptive mother Niohuru Zhen Huan, the Empress Dowager. Childhood sweethearts with Ruyi and her one and only love, he wanted to make her his main wife but his father the Emperor opposes and he is forced to take her as a secondary consort. Although he is initially a benevolent and fair young man, as well as a talented and politically capable ruler, he is revealed to be weak, insecure and selfish as time passes. His suspicious nature makes him distrust Ruyi, despite her showing her sincerity and love for him multiple times. Ruyi is disappointed in him after several instances of him not trusting her. His great jealousy and distrust cause him to end up falling out with Ruyi, and after her death, he spends the rest of his days in deep bitterness and remorse. |

==== Secondary protagonists ====
| Actor | Character | Residence | Introduction |
|---|---|---|---|
| Janine Chang | Keliyete Hailan (珂里叶特·海兰) | Prince Bao's Mansion; Xianfu Palace; Yanxi Palace | Noble Consort Yu (愉贵妃); Embroidery Maid (秀娘) → Lady Keliyete (格格) → First Class Attendant Hai (海常在) → Noble Lady Hai (海贵人) → Concubine Yu (愉嫔) → Consort Yu (愉妃) → Noble Consort Yu (愉贵妃) She entered the palace as an embroidery maid, but thanks to Ruyi, she becomes a Mistress. Hailan is the mother of Prince Yongqi, the Emperor's favorite son. A gentle yet determined woman, she is a loyal friend and confidante of Ruyi, whom she always calls "sister." Although she was initially weak and despised by the other concubines, over time she becomes strong and an exceptionally influential consort in the harem, and usually deals with the imperial consorts standing in Ruyi's way. Her nervous and timid personality changes over time, becoming a very determined woman who does not hesitate to be ruthless and even hurt herself, if that means protecting Ruyi. |
| Vivian Wu | Niohuru Zhenhuan (钮祜禄·甄嬛) | Yongshou Palace; Shoukang Palace; Cining Palace | Empress Xiaoshengxian (孝圣宪皇后); Noble Consort Xi (熹贵妃) → Empress Dowager Chongqing (重庆皇太后) Although she appears to share a civil relationship with her adopted son, they are wary and suspicious of each other. In order to ensure her continued increase in power within the court, she places concubines under her command at Qianlong's side to spy on him. She initially dislikes Qinying because of her familial relationship with Empress Ula Nara, but later grows to respect her, appreciating her wit and prudence and granting her the name Ruyi. |
| Jing Chao | Ling Yunche (凌云彻) | —N/a | Imperial Guard of the Cold Palace (冷宫侍卫) → Imperial Guard of Kunning Palace (坤宁宫侍卫) → Lanling Imperial Guard (蓝翎侍卫) → Imperial Guard of the Third Rank (三级禁卫军) → Slave (奴) → Imperial Guard of the Second Rank (二级禁卫军) → Imperial Guard of the First Rank (一级禁卫军) → Eunuch of Yikun Palace (翊坤宫太监) An imperial guard who helps Ruyi survive in the Cold Palace, and Consort Ling's first love. When Consort Ling ended their relationship, he began to develop feelings for Ruyi due to her kindness towards him. Ling Yunche is a friend and loyal ally to Ruyi and helps her in every way she needs. He later becomes the husband of Uya Maoqian, who betrays him and falsely accuses him of having an affair with Ruyi. Consort Ling cannot forget him and even tries to seduce him to get pregnant with him, however, he rejects her, and she realizes his attraction to Ruyi. Although he rises through the ranks because of his loyalty and efforts, he is ultimately demoted and castrated after being accused of having an affair with Ruyi. The Emperor then forces him to serve as a eunuch in Ruyi's palace to humiliate them both. He is later executed under orders from Hailan, who realizes that only in this way will he cease to be a threat to Ruyi's position as Empress. Ling Yunche understands that he must die to protect Ruyi, however, before dying, he gives Hailan evidence to take down Consort Ling. |

==== Main antagonists ====
| Actor | Character | Residence | Introduction |
|---|---|---|---|
| Tong Yao | Gao Xiyue (高晞月) | Prince Bao's Mansion; Xianfu Palace | Imperial Noble Consort Huixian (慧贤皇贵妃); Lady Gao (高氏) → Mistress (格格) → Secondary Consort (侧福晋) → Noble Consort Hui (慧贵妃) → Imperial Noble Consort (皇贵妃) → Imperial Noble Consort Huixian (慧贤皇贵妃) A skilled pipa player and high-ranking consort, favored by the Qianlong Emperor during the earlier years of his reign. Because of her family's lofty position and her father's status in the imperial court, she is obnoxious and ill-tempered, often abusing her authority. She maintains an alliance with Empress Fuca, and often plots against Ruyi. She treats Empress Fuca as her best friend and serves as her most trusted ally. She pretends to be naive and cheerful in front of the Emperor, but behind his back she behaves as she pleases, often harshly beating and reprimanding other concubines. Hailan was also considered as her enemy for a while. She and Empress Fuca used A'ruo to plot against Ruyi, disgrace her and banish her to the Cold Palace. When she believed A'ruo's ghost was haunting her, she lost the Emperor's favor and was later discarded by the Empress. After Ruyi reveals to her that it was Empress Fuca who made her infertile, she realizes she has been tricked and used by whom she thought was her best friend. On her deathbed, she tells the Emperor all the atrocities the Empress had committed and deliberately gives him scabies as a farewell gift. |
| Dong Jie | Fuca Langhua (富察·琅嬅) | Prince Bao's Mansion; Changchun Palace | Empress Xiaoxianchun (孝贤纯皇后); Lady Fuca (富察氏) → Primary Consort (嫡福晋) → Empress (皇后) → Empress Xiaoxian (孝贤皇后) Elegant and dignified, she presents herself as a virtuous and frugal empress but is insecure, paranoid and jealous. Her grudge against Ruyi for initially being chosen as the primary consort and her close relationship with the Emperor, causes her to often act against her. She presents a gentle facade, however, her true personality is arrogant and scheming. She is under constant pressure to ensure the glory of her maiden family and to have a legitimate son to succeed Qianlong as crown prince. Her mother, Lady Fuca, authorizes her personal attendant Sulian to protect her. Sulian followed Consort Jia's advice and asked Consort Hui to orchestrate all the plots so that the Empress would not be directly implicated. Under these manipulations, she became embroiled in the conspiracy to send Ruyi to the Cold Palace. She appoints eunuchs and palace maids to learn the Emperor's preferences and act accordingly, in order to maintain the highest status in the Emperor's heart. She has very high expectations for her son, 2nd Prince Yonglian, forcing him to study hard even when he was ill, causing the prince to weaken and die. Her second son, 7th Prince Yongcong, dies as an infant from smallpox. Her misguided and insane actions cause the Emperor to break up with her, and her health deteriorates further. During an imperial journey to the south, she falls into a cold lake and develops a severe fever, which leads to her death. Empress Fuca insists that Ruyi is the cause of all her misfortunes, so she insists in her innocence and dies as a woman filled with grievances. Before dying, she begs the Emperor not to appoint Ruyi as the next Empress, demonstrating her extraordinary obsession. |
| Xin Zhilei | Jin Yuyan (金玉妍) | Prince Bao's Mansion; Qixiang Palace | Imperial Noble Consort Shujia (淑嘉皇贵妃); Mistress (格格) → Noble Lady Jia (嘉贵人) → Concubine Jia (嘉嫔) → Consort Jia (嘉妃) → Noble Consort Jia (嘉贵妃) → Concubine Jia (嘉嫔) → Noble Lady Jia (嘉贵人) → Concubine Jia (嘉嫔) → Noble Consort Jia (嘉贵妃) → Second Class Attendant Jin (金答应) → Noble Consort Jia (嘉贵妃) → Commoner (庶人)→ Imperial Noble Consort Shujia (舒嘉皇贵妃) A beautiful concubine from the vassal Yu clan, who was the true mastermind behind most of the incidents in the first half of the story. In the public eye, she presents herself as an ally of Empress Fuca who is subservient and neutral, but in secret she is manipulative and cunning, always thinking of ways to remove anyone who hinders her plans from her path. Her lifelong goal is to gain power and favor from the Emperor to aid her true love, the Prince of her maiden tribe. After entering the palace, she hides in the shadow of Consort Hui and Empress Fuca, making them her puppets. She is very good at instigating conflicts between the concubines and was the main culprit behind the deaths of several concubines and imperial descendants. In the second half of the story, her evil deeds against Ruyi and the harem are revealed, and her aide Zhenshu is sent back to Korea. After losing her greatest ally, she plots to kill the Qianlong Emperor so that her son Yongcheng is elected as Crown Prince to be the next Emperor of the Qing Empire. Her plan fails, and she is left only to rely on her excellent sons to save her position. She becomes the prime target of Consort Ling, who has a strong desire for revenge against her for having bullied her when she was her maid for a while. Consort Jia ends up believing that all the concubines are out to get her, and due to her paranoia, she eventually develops mental problems. Her son Yongcheng ends up being cut off from the line of succession to the throne, and she is locked away in her palace. Ill and disgraced, Ruyi visits her in her final days and delivers the news that the Prince of the Yu clan has abandoned her. Realizing that she has spent her entire life trying to please a petty man who didn't love her, her spirit collapses and she commits suicide without hesitation, promising herself that if she reincarnates, she will live a normal and peaceful life. After her death, the Emperor bestows upon her the posthumous title of Imperial Noble Consort "Shujia," a homophone for "loser". |
| Li Chun | Wei Yanwan (卫嬿婉) (Note: She was renamed 卫嬿婉 in the subtitles in China, to avoid historical disputes. Her original name is 魏嬿婉 in the novel and the Taiwan version.) | Yongshou Palace | Empress Xiaoyichun (孝仪纯皇后); Palace Maid (宫女) → Zhongcui Palace Maid (钟粹宫宫女) → Imperial Flower Department Maid (御花房宫女) → Qixiang Palace Maid (启祥宫宫女) → Second Class Attendant Wei (卫答应) → First Class Attendant Wei (卫常在) → Noble Lady Ling (令贵人) → Concubine Ling (令嫔) → Consort Ling (令妃) → Second Class Attendant Wei (卫答应) → Noble Lady Ling (令贵人) → Concubine Ling (令嫔) → Consort Ling (令妃) → Noble Consort Ling (令贵妃) → Imperial Noble Consort (皇贵妃) An ambitious young woman who rises from being a palace servant to a noble imperial consort, placed in charge of the harem after Ruyi fell out of favor with the emperor. In the first half of the story, she was a girl born into a poor family who became a palace maid. Always driven by obligations toward her family, she is regarded as their main breadwinner. Her mother was prejudiced against her and preferred her son Zuolu, even though he was a delinquent and good-for-nothing. She faces hardships and constant mistreatment in the palace and her evil ambitions grow with the passing of time. She was also Ling Yunche's first love, but after being bullied by Consort Jia, Ling Yunche was unable to help her at all. This causes her to scorn him, telling him she doesn't want to be the wife of a low-ranking palace guard, cutting ties with him. She is helped by the eunuch Jin Zhong, who is in love with her, to gain the Emperor's attention and gain entry into the harem. In the second half of the story, she dedicates herself to learning Chinese dance, Kunqu opera, jewelry appraisal, archery, and Mongolian cavalry to refine herself in her new position as a concubine. Through seduction tricks and skillful stratagems, she quickly gets the Emperor to promote her and then makes the entire harem bully Consort Jia in revenge. Consort Ling transforms everything she learns into weapons to advance her position. She doesn't care about love, and because of this tenacious personality, she receives enormous favor from Emperor Qianlong. Despite ending her relationship with Ling Yunche when she became Qianlong's concubine, she still believed that he still had feelings for her. When she discovers that Ling Yunche has feelings for Ruyi, she can't stand her jealousy and hatred, and her ambition to take away her Empress position is fueled further. She becomes a master manipulator and manages to gather many influential people and turn them all against Ruyi, such as Grand Princess Hejing, Kunqu artists, Nanny Tian, the 5th Prince's concubine (Nanny Tian's daughter), the Imperial Astronomer, court officials, most of the concubines, and even the Emperor himself. Her vengeful mentality is brilliant, tremendous, and cruel. In the final confrontation, the Emperor himself uncovers all her lies and evil deeds. It is revealed that she caused the deaths of many concubines, imperial descendants, and innocent people, as well as her relationship to Ling Yunche. She is sentenced to be locked away in her palace and poisoned on a daily basis. Going mad after years of confinement, she is finally granted death. |

=== Supporting ===
==== Harem ====
| Actor | Character | Residence | Introduction |
|---|---|---|---|
| Hu Ke | Su Lüyun (苏绿筠) | Prince Bao's Mansion; Zhongcui Palace | Imperial Noble Consort Chunhui (纯惠皇贵妃); Lady (格格) → Concubine Chun (纯嫔) → Consort Chun (纯妃) → Noble Consort Chun (纯贵妃) → Imperial Noble Consort (皇贵妃) → Imperial Noble Consort Chunhui (纯惠皇贵妃) She was selected as a concubine when Emperor Qianlong was still a prince. Naive and kind, she is often manipulated. She loves her son Yongzhang very much and will do anything for him. She has a good relationship with Ruyi and Hailan since their days at Prince Bao's Mansion. Initially recommended to succeed Empress Fuca, she falls out of favor but remains an important figure in the harem as a Noble Consort, being the most experienced consort in the harem due to having given birth to both sons and daughters. When Consort Rong arrives at the palace and Qianlong becomes obsessed with her, Consort Chun and her son fall out of favor with the Emperor for good, and she later dies of an illness. |
| Cao Xiwen | Chen Wanyin (陈婉茵) | Prince Bao's Mansion; Zhongcui Palace | Noble Consort Wan (婉贵妃); Lady (格格) → Second Class Attendant Wan (婉答应) → First Class Attendant Wan (婉常在) → Noble Lady Wan (婉贵人) → Concubine Wan (婉嫔) → Consort Wan (婉妃) She was chosen as a concubine when the Qianlong Emperor was still a prince. She is a timid and complacent woman, who remains neutral in harem politics and does not dare to aim higher, despite always vying for the Qianlong Emperor's favor. She always went unnoticed and never joined any group, preferring to remain silent. She was never favored and expressed her love for the Emperor through countless portraits of him that she painted over the years. She has a good relationship with Ruyi, but unknowingly becomes part of Consort Ling's plan to separate Ruyi from Qianlong. |
| Han Dantong | Huang Qiying (黄琦莹) | Prince Bao's Mansion; Jingyang Palace; Yanxi Palace | Concubine Yi (仪嫔); Prince Bao Consort Fuca's Maid → Mistress (格格) → Noble Lady Yi (仪贵人) → Concubine Yi (仪嫔) A former personal maid of Empress Fuca. She entered the harem after Qianlong took advantage of her while he was still a prince. Empress Fuca and Consort Hui despised her, considering her to be of low status and to have stolen the Emperor's affection. Unbeknownst to them, Consort Jia had Concubine Yi abort the baby she was carrying so that it would not be born before her own son. Soon after, Yi was manipulated by Empress Fuca and Consort Hui into believing that Ruyi had been responsible for her abortion while she was under her care in Yanxi palace. Thirsty for revenge, she attempts to kill her but fails and ends up dying due to her weakened health. |
| Zeng Yixuan | Socolun A'ruo (索索绰伦·阿箬) | Prince Bao's Mansion; Yanxi Palace; Qixiang Palace | Concubine Shen (慎嫔); Senior Maid of Secondary Consort Ula Nara → Senior Maid of Consort Xian → Palace Maid (宫女) → First Class Attendant Shen (慎常在) → Noble Lady Shen (慎贵人) → Concubine Shen (慎嫔) → Commoner (庶人) Originally a servant of Ruyi, she entered the palace as her dowry maid. Although she is initially subservient, as the story progresses she grows more arrogant, shallow, and sharp-tongued, becoming conceited due to her father's abilities in court. She turns bitter toward Ruyi after being manipulated by Consort Jia, and secretly conspires with Empress Fuca and Noble Consort Hui against Ruyi in an effort to rise in status. After falsely framing Ruyi for murdering the children of Concubines Yi and Mei, the Emperor grants her the title of First-Class Attendant Shen. Although the entire palace believes she is heavily favored by Qianlong, he actually uses and despises her. Eventually, it is discovered that A'Ruo framed Ruyi, and she confesses that she has always hated her. She is stripped of her title and sent to the Cold Palace as a commoner, where she commits suicide. |
| He Hongshan | Bai Ruiji (白蕊姬) | Yonghe Palace; Anhua Hall | Concubine Mei (玫嫔); Musician of Nanfu Office → Second Class Attendant Mei (玫答应) → First Class Attendant Mei (玫常在) → Noble Lady Mei (玫贵人) → Concubine Mei (玫嫔) A yueqin player from the Southern Mansion. She is detested by Consort Hui, who considers her inferior and rivals her in talents. She was the first pawn sent by the Empress Dowager to spy on Qianlong, and the first woman brought into the harem upon Qianlong's ascension to the throne. Though initially favored, she gives birth to a stillborn son who was born with a terrible deformity, thus her health declines and she eventually loses the Emperor's favor. Although she initially believes that Ruyi was responsible for her son's death, she is later manipulated by Consort Jia into thinking that her son had actually been killed by Empress Fuca and she is used as a chess piece by Consort Jia to cause the Empress's death. However, when her actions are revealed, she is used by Qianlong as a scapegoat to weaken the Empress Dowager's control within the harem. She ultimately dies a grievous death after realizing she had taken revenge on the wrong person. |
| Chen Haoyu | Yehe Nara Yihuan (叶赫那拉·意欢) | Chuxiu Palace | Consort Shu (舒妃); Noble Lady Shu (舒贵人) → Concubine Shu (舒嫔) → Consort Shu (舒妃) A beautiful, straightforward and good-natured young woman, recommended to enter the Palace by the Empress Dowager. She is a good singer and enjoys poetry, a passion she shares with Qianlong. Despite being the second pawn sent by the Empress Dowager to spy on Qianlong, she is loyal and devoted to him and has long been sincerely in love with him, having first seen him during one of his walks. She stays out of internal conflicts within the palace, preferring to keep to herself, and becomes good friends with Ruyi. Unbeknownst to her, for years Qianlong gives her a contraceptive disguised as a conception medicine, due to her connection to the Empress Dowager. When she stops drinking the medicine she becomes pregnant with a son, the 10th prince, much to Qianlong's reluctance. However her son has a delicate health and when he dies, she becomes depressed and unstable. When Consort Ling reveals Qianlong's true intentions to her, she commits suicide. |
| Yu Yang | Lu Muping (陆沐萍) | Jingyang Palace | Imperial Noble Consort Qinggong (庆恭皇贵妃); First Class Attendant Qing (庆常在) → Noble Lady Qing (庆贵人) → Concubine Qing (庆嫔) → Noble Lady Qing (庆贵人) → Concubine Qing (庆嫔) → Consort Qing (庆妃) → Noble Consort Qing (庆贵妃) Very naive, hypocritical and easy to manipulate, she often sides with any imperial consort who is favored at the time, but lacks the cunning to act on her own. She was the third pawn sent by Empress Dowager to spy on Qianlong. She is the daughter of the Vice Minister of the Court of Sacrificial Worship. After Concubine Mei makes her drink a medicine that makes her infertile, she begins working for Consort Ling. |
| Liu Meitong | Lady Bai'erguosishe (拜尔果斯氏) | Xianfu Palace | Concubine Ke (恪嫔); Noble Lady Ke (恪贵人) → Concubine Ke (恪嫔) The first Mongolian princess to become a member of the harem from Mongolia. She comes from Mongolian royalty, and she is very skilled in cavalry and archery. With a cheerful and honest personality, she is close to Consort Ying and hates Consort Ling. |
| Zhang Jianing | Barin Meiruo (巴林·湄若) | Chuxiu Palace | Noble Consort Ying (颖贵妃); Concubine Ying (颖嫔) → Consort Ying (颖妃) → Noble Consort Ying (颖贵妃) Intelligent, spirited and eloquent yet blunt, she is the second Mongolian princess to join the harem and serves as a representative for all the Mongolian imperial consorts. She is said to have a "southern beauty." She despises Consorts Ling and Jia, and becomes close friends with Ruyi. After losing her daughter to a miscarriage caused by Consort Jia's dog, instigated by Consort Ling, she adopts and raises the latter's daughter. |
| Zhao Ke | Borjigin Eyinzhu (博尔济吉特·厄音珠) | Yonghe Palace | Consort Yu (豫妃); Concubine Yu (豫嫔) → Consort Yu (豫妃) Arrogant and defiant, she was the third Mongolian princess to join the harem and quickly becomes favored by the Qianlong Emperor due to her exuberance, despite being over 30 years old when she joined the harem. However, as she loses the Emperor's favor after it was discovered she was spying on him for her father, she begins to fabricate lies. Along with Consort Ling and Maoqian, she falsely accuses Ruyi of having an affair with Ling Yunche to make her lose the Empress position, which she desired for herself. When the Emperor discovers she had lied about Ruyi, she ultimately loses her title and is sent to the torture chamber. |
| Li Qin | Han Xiangjian (寒香见) | Chengqian Palace; Baoyue Hall | Consort Rong (容妃); Han Tribe Princess → Noble Lady Rong (容贵人) → Concubine Rong (容嫔) → Consort Rong (容妃) The only princess of East Turkestan to join the Inner Palace of the Qing Dynasty, of an exquisite and irresistible beauty. She is a beautiful young woman brought to the palace by General Zhaohui after her tribe was conquered by the Qing Empire. However, she hates her stay in the Forbidden City and her sole goal is to assassinate Qianlong to avenge her fiancé, Han Qi, who was killed by an avalanche while she was being forcibly taken to the capital. She gets along well with Ruyi, to whom she is grateful for saving her from her depression. Her beauty, which captivates the Qianlong Emperor, causes fear and jealousy in the harem upon her arrival. Qianlong becomes obsessed with her and gives her extraordinary gifts to win her love, however, she abhors the Emperor and maintains her loyalty to her deceased fiancé, knowing he does not truly love her and only desires her for her looks. Although she does not love Qianlong, she eventually accepts her place in the harem. She is a melancholic yet straightforward woman who is not afraid to express her true thoughts, and she takes advantage of her great beauty and influence over the Emperor to tell him what no one else dares to. |
| Sun Wenting | Lady Lin (林氏) | Jingren Palace | First Class Attendant Gong (恭常在) A Mongolian woman, she is close to Consort Ying and hates Consort Ling. |
| Wang Mian | Lady Sirin Gioro (西林觉罗氏) | Jingren Palace | First Class Attendant Xi (禧常在) |
| Zhu Jue | Lady Socolun (索绰伦氏) | Jingyang Palace | Noble Lady Rui (瑞贵人) |
| Xia Yuxia | Lady Fang (方氏) | Yonghe Palace | First Class Attendant Kui (揆常在); Palace Maid (宫女) → Second Class Attendant Kui (揆答应) → First Class Attendant Kui (揆常在) |
| Zhao Ruoxi | Lady Xu (徐氏) | Jingyang Palace; Zhongcui Palace | First Class Attendant Xiu (秀常在); Second Class Attendant Xiu (秀答应) → First Class Attendant Xiu (秀常在) |
| Qu Rong | Lady Qian (钱氏) | Yonghe Palace | First Class Attendant Ping (平常在); Palace Maid (宫女) → Second Class Attendant Ping (平答应) → First Class Attendant Ping (平常在) |
| Huang Lulu | Lady Bai (白氏) | Jingyang Palace | First Class Attendant Bai (白常在) |
| Song Qinglin | Lady Lu (陆氏) | Jingyang Palace | First Class Attendant Lu (陆常在) |
| Yang Wanyi | | | First Class Attendant Wu (武常在) |
| Gao Rui | | | First Class Attendant Bai (柏常在) |
| Sun Wanting | | | First Class Attendant Ning (宁常在) |
| Jin Ning | | | First Class Attendant Fu (福常在) |

==== Imperial Family ====
| Actor | Character | Residence | Introduction |
|---|---|---|---|
| Zhang Fengyi | Aisin Gioro Yinzhen (爱新觉罗·胤禛) | Yangxin Hall | Emperor Shizong of Qing (清世宗); Yongzheng Emperor (雍正帝) → Emperor Shizong (世宗) Father of the Qianlong Emperor. After deposing Empress Ula Nara, he objects to Hongli choosing Ruyi as his primary wife, ordering him to leave the palace and having him choose Fuca Langhua instead. However, he allows Ruyi to return to the palace as a secondary wife after Hongli begs him to forgive her. He dies six years after Ruyi's marriage. |
| Joan Chen | Ula Nara Yixiu (乌拉那拉·宜修) | Jingren Palace | Empress Xiaojingxian (孝敬宪皇后); Empress (皇后) → Mistress of Jingren Palace (景仁宫娘娘) Ruyi's paternal aunt. A rival of Niohuru Zhenhuan, she is placed under house arrest along with her son Hongshi at the beginning of the series, after being accused of plotting against the emperor. The fall from grace of her aunt, the Empress, compromises the reputation of the Ula Nara clan and greatly affects Ruyi's position in the court, as she is seen as the disgraced niece of a traitor. She dies locked up in her palace, not even allowed to attend the funeral of the Yongzheng Emperor. |
| Zhu Yan | —N/a | Cold Palace | Dowager Concubine Ji (吉太嫔) One of the Yongzheng Emperor's former imperial concubines who was banished to the Cold Palace, although the exact reason is unknown, it was supposedly due to Niohuru Zhenhuan's influence. Despite being in her 30s, she has the appearance of an elderly woman. While in the Cold Palace, she met Ruyi and tried to kill the Empress Dowager, whom she hates. After this assassination attempt, she is taken away and executed. |
| Li Jie; Ma Qiyue (young) | Aisin Gioro Hongshi (爱新觉罗·弘时) | Third Prince's Mansion | Third Prince Hongshi (三阿哥弘时) Third son of the Yongzheng Emperor and Empress Ula Nara's adopted son. He was stripped of his noble title and banished from the palace after being falsely accused of treason against the Emperor. |
| Wang Xiao | Aisin Gioro Hongzhou (爱新觉罗·弘昼) | Prince He's Mansion | Prince He of the First Rank (和亲王) Fifth son of the Yongzheng Emperor. He chose to stay out of the succession battle. |
| Tang Chengjing | Lady Ujaku (乌扎库氏) | Prince He's Mansion | Primary Consort of Prince He of the First Rank (和亲王嫡福晋) |
| Xuan Lu | Aisin Gioro Hengchuo (爱新觉罗·恒娖) | Dzungar Khanate; Dawachi Khan's Mansion; Cining Palace | Grand Princess Duanshu (端淑长公主) Elder daughter of the Yongzheng Emperor and the Empress Dowager, and a half-sister to Qianlong, whom she resents for marrying her off to a faraway land at a young age. She was initially married to Dorza Khan and becomes High Princess of the Dzungar Khanate. After her husband is killed, she is forced to marry his usurper, Dawachi Khan. |
| Wang Herun | Aisin Gioro Hengti (爱新觉罗·恒媞) | Yongshou Palace; Cining Palace; Zong Mansion | Grand Princess Roushu (柔淑长公主) Younger daughter of the Yongzheng Emperor and the Empress Dowager. Initially chosen for a marriage alliance to Khorchin's tribe instead of Jingse, she is later married to Deputy Minister Zong Zheng. |
| Guan Xueying; Wu Yuyu (teen); Liu Sitong (young) | Aisin Gioro Jingse (爱新觉罗·璟瑟) | Prince Bao's Mansion; Changchun Palace; Khorchin Mongolia; Third Princess' Mansion | Princess Hejing of the First Rank (固伦和敬公主); Third Princess (三公主) → Princess Hejing of the First Rank (固伦和敬公主) Third daughter of the Qianlong Emperor by Empress Fuca. A proud and arrogant young woman, Jingse is Empress Fuca's only surviving child. She looks down on the imperial consorts due to her noble birth, since she is the daughter of both emperors and therefore the legitimate princess. She is resentful of Ruyi due to her rivalry with her mother, and for having been a key piece in Qianlong's decision to send her away to marry Septeng Baljur, prince of the Mongol Khorchin tribe, with whom she lives an unhappy marriage. Her position as Grand Princess is higher than Ruyi's as empress, due to the princess's blood relationship with the Emperor, so she seeks to harm Ruyi time and time again due to her mother's wish expressed upon her death. After her son Qingyou is seemingly saved from drowning by Consort Ling, she supports her in her plans to destroy Ruyi, until Jingse realizes her great ambition. |
| Ding Qiao; Wang Donghe (teen); Ye Kaiwan (young) | Aisin Gioro Yonghuang (爱新觉罗·永璜) | Prince Bao's Mansion; Yanxi Palace; Zhongcui Palace; Eldest Prince's Mansion | Prince Ding'an of the First Rank (定安亲王); Eldest Prince (大阿哥) → Prince Ding'an of the First Rank (定安亲王) Eldest son of the Qianlong Emperor by Imperial Noble Consort Zheminm, and therefore the 1st Prince. Innocent and mild-mannered, he is abused and neglected by the nannies after the death of his biological mother. He becomes Ruyi's adoptive son, whom he affectionately calls "mother." Later, when Ruyi is sent to the Cold Palace, he becomes the adoptive son of Consort Chun. Initially a shy and simple-minded young man, Yonghuang later grows up to be ambitious and yearning to succeed his father. Yonghuang is manipulated by Consort Jia into believing that Empress Fuca had killed his biological mother, causing him to lose the Emperor's favor. He later dies of a serious illness. |
| Ma Yanan | Lady Ilari (伊拉里氏) | Eldest Prince's Mansion; Prince Ding's Mansion | Primary Consort of Prince Ding'an of the First Rank (定安亲王嫡福晋); Lady Ilari (伊拉里氏) → Primary Consort (嫡福晋) Yonghuang's wife and a distant relative of Consort Chun. She is chosen to marry Yonghuang because of her humble family background. |
| Yu Yao | Aisin Gioro Yonglian (爱新觉罗·永琏) | Prince Bao's Mansion; Changchun Palace; Xiefang Hall | Crown Prince Duanhui (端慧皇太子); Second Prince (二阿哥) → Crown Prince Duanhui (端慧皇太子) Second son of the Qianlong Emperor by Empress Fuca. A sickly child who was always pushed to excel academically by his mother, the Empress, due to his status as a legitimate son, in the hopes that he would become Crown Prince. He dies very young from an asthma attack. After his death, his father the Emperor bestows upon him the posthumous title of Crown Prince Duanhui. |
| Cheng Xingyuan; Liu Zeyu (teen); He Luanhui (young) | Aisin Gioro Yongzhang (爱新觉罗·永璋) | Zhongcui Palace; Third Prince's Mansion | Prince Xun of the Second Rank (循郡王); Third Prince (三阿哥) → Prince Xun of the Second Rank (循郡王) Third son of the Qianlong Emperor by Consort Chun. A kind and hardworking person, though he didn't stand out much, he is goaded by his mother to compete for the position of crown prince and becomes ambitious. After the death of Empress Fuca, he fell out of favor with his father. |
| An Jie; Hu Xianxu (teen); Rong Zishan (young) | Aisin Gioro Yongcheng (爱新觉罗·永珹) | Qixiang Palace; Fourth Prince's Mansion; Prince Lü's Mansion | Prince Lü of the First Rank (履亲王); Fourth Prince (四阿哥) → Prince Lü of the First Rank (履亲王) Fourth son of the Qianlong Emperor by Consort Jia. A talented young man who is initially highly favored due to being the first son born after the Qianlong Emperor's ascension, becoming his favorite son. Ambitious, cunning and calculating, he eventually loses the Emperor's trust after the incident in the Mu Lan hunting grounds and Consort Jia's multiple maneuvers to make his son the lead contender for the throne, causing him to be disinherited and expelled from the palace. |
| Tang Mengjia | Lady Irgen Gioro (伊尔根觉罗氏) | Prince Lü's Mansion | Primary Consort of Prince Lü of the First Rank (履亲王嫡福晋); Lady Irgen Gioro (伊尔根觉罗氏) → Primary Consort (嫡福晋) Yongcheng's wife. She is chosen by Consort Jia due to her strong and noble family background. |
| Qu Chuxiao; Bian Cheng (teen); Wuze Jinxi (young) | Aisin Gioro Yongqi (爱新觉罗·永琪) | Yanxi Palace; Yikun Palace; Prince Rong's Mansion; Chonghua Palace | Prince Rong of the First Rank (荣亲王); Fifth Prince (五阿哥) → Prince Rong of the First Rank (荣亲王) Fifth son of the Qianlong Emperor by Noble Consort Yu and Ruyi's foster son. Sensitive and intelligent, he becomes his father's favorite son. He is very observant and talented, but is pressured to hide such skills to avoid making any of his brothers jealous, lest they target him. Consort Jia is shown to be jealous of him, as Yongqi's talent poses a threat to her plans for her son Yongcheng. Although he is initially very close to Ruyi, he eventually distances himself from her after being manipulated by Tian Yun'er. He later dies of an illness, but Qianlong blames Ruyi for his death. |
| Li Yiru | Lady Sirin Gioro (西林觉罗氏) | Prince Rong's Mansion; Yanxi Palace | Primary Consort of Prince Rong of the First Rank (荣亲王嫡福晋); Lady Sirin Gioro (西林觉罗氏) → Primary Consort (嫡福晋) Yongqi's main wife. The marriage is granted by the Qianlong Emperor as a political move and because their marriage was out of duty rather than love, Yongqi keeps himself busy with court matters while she manages his household and concubines. |
| Janice Wu | Tian Yun'er (田云儿)/Hu Yunjiao (胡芸角) | Prince Rong's Mansion | Mistress Hu (胡格格) Yongqi's concubine and the daughter of Nanny Tian. She is manipulated by Consort Ling into believing that Ruyi killed her mother. She is sent under a false identity to become Yongqi's concubine and ordered to sow discord between him and Ruyi. She dies by suicide after accusing Ruyi of Yongqi's death in front of the Emperor. |
| Zhang Jinze; Zhou Jinshi (teen); Chixu Xuanzhe (young) | Aisin Gioro Yongrong (爱新觉罗·永瑢) | Zhongcui Palace | Prince Shen of the Second Rank (慎郡王); Sixth Prince (六阿哥) → Prince Shen of the Second Rank (慎郡王) Sixth son of the Qianlong Emperor by Consort Chun. |
| He Xinrui | Aisin Gioro Jingyan (爱新觉罗·璟妍) | Zhongcui Palace | Princess Hejia of the Second Rank (和硕和嘉公主); Fourth Princess (四公主) → Princess Hejia of the Second Rank (和硕和嘉公主) Fourth daughter of the Qianlong Emperor by Consort Chun. |
| Ma Boquan; Ha Lin (young) | Aisin Gioro Yongxuan (爱新觉罗·永璇) | Qixiang Palace; Xiefang Hall; Shoukang Palace | Prince Yi of the First Rank (仪亲王); Eighth Prince (八阿哥) → Prince Yi of the First Rank (仪亲王) Eighth son of the Qianlong Emperor by Consort Jia. His saddle is secretly altered on Consort Ling's orders, resulting in him falling from his horse and being permanently disabled in one leg, and Yongqi being accused by Consort Jia. |
| Dongli Wuyou; Zhang Yaoyang (young) | Aisin Gioro Yongxing (爱新觉罗·永瑆) | Qixiang Palace; Xiefang Hall; Shoukang Palace | Prince Cheng of the First Rank (成亲王); Eleventh Prince (十一阿哥) → Prince Cheng of the First Rank (成亲王) Eleventh son of the Qianlong Emperor by Consort Jia. |
| Xu Lingchen; Ye Shengtong (teen); Lin Jingjie (young) | Aisin Gioro Yongji (爱新觉罗·永璂) | Yikun Palace; Yanxi Palace | Prince of the Third Rank (贝勒); Twelfth Prince (十二阿哥) → Prince of the Third Rank (贝勒) Twelfth son of the Qianlong Emperor by Ruyi. Free-spirited and adventurous, his father has high expectations for him because he is the only legitimate son. Ling Yunche becomes her personal guard and they become close to each other. Yongji is used by Consort Ling as a pawn to trick Qianlong into believing that Ruyi is indeed having an affair with Ling Yunche, slipping poisonous mushrooms into his food to make him hallucinate seeing them together. Young Yongji becomes disappointed in everyone around him and falls into depression. |
| Lin Jingyi | Aisin Gioro Jingsi (爱新觉罗·璟兕) | Yikun Palace | Princess Heyi of the First Rank (固伦和宜公主); Fifth Princess (五公主) → Princess Heyi of the First Rank (固伦和宜公主) Fifth daughter of the Qianlong Emperor by Ruyi. She is born premature and with a heart condition that worsens after being startled by Consort Jia's dog, falling into a trap orchestrated by Consort Ling. This shock leads to her death, which is deeply felt by her parents. |
| Jin Ziqi | Aisin Gioro Jingyuan (爱新觉罗·璟妧) | Yongshou Palace; Chuxiu Palace | Princess Hejing of the First Rank (固伦和静公主); Seventh Princess (七公主) → Princess Hejing of the First Rank (固伦和静公主) Seventh daughter of the Qianlong Emperor by Consort Ling. Since her birth, she was adopted by Consort Ying, whom she considers her true mother. Jingyuan loves Ruyi and hates Consort Ling, as she knows she hurts Ruyi. |
| Chen Yuan'er | Aisin Gioro Jingyun (爱新觉罗·璟妘) | Shoukang Palace; Yongshou Palace; Xianfu Palace | Princess Heke of the Second Rank (和硕和恪公主); Ninth Princess (九公主) → Princess Heke of the Second Rank (和硕和恪公主) Ninth daughter of the Qianlong Emperor by Consort Ling and Concubine Ke's foster daughter. She is separated from her mother at birth and first raised by the dowager consorts, so she has a weak relationship with her. |
| Wei Zihan; Chen Xuetao (young) | Aisin Gioro Yongyan (爱新觉罗·永琰) | Yongshou Palace; Shoukang Palace; Prince Jia's Mansion | Emperor Renzong of Qing (清仁宗); Fifteenth Prince (十五阿哥) → Prince Jia of the First Rank (嘉亲王) → Jiaqing Emperor (嘉庆帝) Fifteenth son of the Qianlong Emperor by Consort Ling. At the end of Qianlong's reign, he is named Crown Prince. |
| Tang Jiaze | Borjigin Qingyou (孛兒只斤·慶佑) | Khorchin Mongolia; Third Princess's Mansion | Heir Apparent (世子) Jingse's only child. He is the young heir to the Khorchin throne. |

==== Imperial Court ====
| Actor | Character | Introduction |
|---|---|---|
| Qin Yan | Zhang Tingyu (张廷玉) | Member of the Grand Council. He dislikes the Empress Dowager and often goes against her opinions. |
| Jia Tinglong | Fuca Fuheng (富察·傅恒) | Senior official and commander-in-chief of the army. He is Empress Fuca's brother. |
| Gao Lancun | Gao Bin (高斌) | The Qianlong Emperor's most trusted official. He is Noble Consort Hui's father. |
| Wang Jinsong | Ula Nara Na'erbu (乌拉那拉·那尔布) | Ruyi's father. |
| Ma Weifu | Liu Tongxun (刘统勋) | Minister of the Eight Banners. |
| Huang Wei | Niohuru Naqin (钮祜禄·讷亲) | Minister of the Eight Banners. He is a close relative of the Empress Dowager. |
| Zhang Xingzhe | Zhao Hui (兆惠) | |
| Wu Lihua | Yue Zhongqi (岳钟琪) | |

==== Female servants ====
| Actor | Character | Residence | Introduction |
|---|---|---|---|
| Chen Xiaoyun | Suoxin (惢心) | Prince Bao's Mansion; Yanxi Palace; Yikun Palace | Patient, kind and soft-spoken, she is one of Ruyi's maids since her time in Prince Bao's Mansion and later becomes her senior maid. She remains loyal to Ruyi during difficult times and she is in love with Jiang Yubin, her childhood sweetheart. When she is subjected to excessive torture because of Consort Jia, Suoxin is left with a permanent disability in one leg. Ruyi then decides to marry her off to Jiang Yubin so that she can leave the palace and live a peaceful life away from the intrigues of the harem. |
| Qi Huan | Rongpei (容珮) | Yikun Palace | Loyal, firm, and sharp-tongued, she is an orphan who spent her life working as a maid at the Imperial Gardens. She meets Ruyi after being sent to the Forbidden City's Washing Bureau and succeeds Suoxin as her senior maid and personal attendant. Ruyi meets her after Suoxin's departure, and finds her to be a steadfast and capable woman. She cares deeply for Ruyi, does everything for her, and becomes her confidant and personal friend. Immediately after Ruyi's death, she dies as well. |
| Zheng Shuijing | Lingzhi (菱枝) | Yikun Palace | Ruyi's maid. |
| Chen Erjia | Yunzhi (芸枝) | Yikun Palace | Ruyi's maid. |
| Li Linfei | Shuizhi (水芝) | Yanxi Palace | Ruyi's maid. |
| Gong Xiaoxuan | Yuhu (毓瑚) | Yangxin Hall | The Qianlong Emperor's senior maid and the former personal assistant of his biological mother. A fair and honest woman who helps the Emperor monitor the inner palace and investigate all incidents that occur within it. |
| Guo Hong | Fujia (福珈) | Yongshou Palace; Shoukang Palace; Cining Palace | The Empress Dowager's senior maid. |
| Zhang Yanyan | Xiuxia (绣夏) | Jingren Palace | Empress Ula Nara's senior maid. |
| Min Chunxiao | Sulian (素练) | Prince Bao's Mansion; Changchun Palace | Empress Fuca's senior maid. She often helps the Empress plot against the other consorts behind their backs. She is later murdered by Zhenshu to raise suspicions against Consort Chun. |
| Wang Xiaocheng | Lianxin (莲心) | Changchun Palace | Empress Fuca's maid. She was forced to marry Wang Qin under the orders of the Empress, to ensure his loyalty. Lianxin is physically abused by Wang Qin while she is his wife, and attempts to commit suicide by falling into a lake but is saved by Ruyi, who promises to help her be freed from her marriage. After a maneuver, she manages to get the Emperor to annul her marriage to Wang Qin. When Empress Fuca falls into the water, Lianxin watches but decides not to save her, which ultimately leads to her death by committing suicide out of guilt. |
| Liu Jia | Yexin (叶心) | Xianfu Palace; Yanxi Palace | Noble Consort Yu's senior maid. |
| Zhang Huanhuan | Xiangyun (香云) | Xianfu Palace; Yanxi Palace | Noble Consort Yu's maid. She was instructed by Consort Hui to frame her mistress for stealing her charcoal supply. She dies as punishment for betraying Hailan. |
| Li Bingyi | Zezhi (泽芝) | Xianfu Palace; Yanxi Palace | One of Ruyi's maids who is later sent to serve Noble Consort Yu. |
| Guo Yuanyuan | Zhenshu (贞淑) | Qixiang Palace | Consort Jia's senior maid, confidant, and collaborator. She is a highly skilled healer from her natal clan. She was responsible for framing Ruyi and falsely accusing her of having an affair with Anji Bosang, the Great Buddhist Master. After being discovered, she is sent back to the Yu clan. |
| Xia Nan | Lixin (丽心) | Qixiang Palace | Consort Jia's maid. |
| Zhou Xiaoqin | Palace Maid Yan (妍宫女) | Qixiang Palace | Consort Jia's maid. |
| Sun Qianqian | Moxin (茉心) | Prince Bao's Mansion; Xianfu Palace | Noble Consort Hui's senior maid. After Consort Hui's death, she seeks revenge for her by seeking out Ruyi and Hailan to pass smallpox to the Empress's son, 7th Prince Yongcong, but they refuse. She later partners with Concubine Mei, who agrees to use a contaminated handkerchief to infect Yongcong's wet nurse, thus causing his death. Moxin later dies of smallpox too. |
| Li Mengyang | Xingxuan (星璇) | Xianfu Palace | Noble Consort Hui's dowry maid. |
| Wang Chun | Chunchan (春婵) | Yongshou Palace | Consort Ling's senior maid and close friend before she becomes an imperial consort. She is behind all of Consort Ling's schemes. After being scarred by the Ling Yunche and Lancui incident, and Jingzhong's murder, she begins to fear for her life. After Consort Ling attempts to get rid of her by poison, she reveals all of her evil deeds to the Emperor. |
| Yang Liu | Lancui (澜翠) | Yongshou Palace | Consort Ling's maid and close friend before she becomes an imperial consort. She was used as bait to threaten Zhao Jiuxiao into harming the 8th Prince. |
| Bai Lan | Kexin (可心) | Zhongcui Palace | Consort Chun's senior maid. |
| Ding Liuyan | Suyun (俗云) | Yonghe Palace; Anhua Hall | Concubine Mei's senior maid. |
| Shi Min | Hexi (荷惜) | Chuxiu Palace | Consort Shu's senior maid. |
| Zhang Xinying | Xinyan (新燕) | Qixiang Palace | Concubine Shen's senior maid. |
| Wang Jingya | Shunxin (顺心) | Zhongcui Palace | Consort Wan's senior maid. |
| Wang Xinwen | A'bao (阿宝) | Chuxiu Palace | Consort Ying's senior maid. |
| Zhang Menghan | | Xianfu Palace | Concubine Ke's senior maid. |
| Chen Mengxi | Xipo (喜珀) | Chengqian Palace; Baoyue Hall | Consort Rong's senior maid and confidant. |
| Gao Dongyu | Hali (哈丽) | Chengqian Palace; Baoyue Hall | Consort Rong's maid who is brought from her homeland. |
| Zhang Xinyuan | Guli (古丽) | Chengqian Palace; Baoyue Hall | Consort Rong's maid who is brought from her homeland. |
| Ma Lan | | Jingyang Palace | Consort Qing's senior maid. |
| Huang Wen | Huaixin (怀心) | Jingyang Palace; Yanxi Palace | Concubine Yi's senior maid. |
| Zhao Jing | Duoyun (朵云) | Yonghe Palace | Consort Yu's senior maid. |
| Jin Xi | Duoyan (朵颜) | Yonghe Palace | Consort Yu's senior maid. |
| Tian Miao | Nursemaid/Nanny Tian (田嬷嬷) | —N/a | Midwife and mother of Mistress Hu, Tian Yun'er. She was bought by Consort Ling and used to commit various crimes for her, including causing the 13th prince, Ruyi's son, to be stillborn. |

==== Male servants ====
| Actor | Character | Residence | Introduction |
|---|---|---|---|
Imperial guards, imperial physicians and others
| Yuan Wenkang | Jiang Yubin (江与彬) | —N/a | Head Imperial Physician and Ruyi's most trusted doctor, as well as a childhood friend of Li Yu and Suoxin. He is a kind man and later marries Suoxin. |
| Meng Zhaozhong | Zhao Jiuxiao (赵九霄) | —N/a | Imperial Guard at the Cold Palace and later at Kunning Palace, and a good friend of Ling Yunche. He is in love with Lancui, so when Wei Yanwan threatens to kill her if he doesn't help her frame Ruyi for harming the 8th Prince, he does so. |
| Wang Quanyou | Qi Ru (齐汝) | —N/a | Head Imperial Physician. He secretly works for the Empress Dowager behind Qianlong's back, so when Qianlong discovers the truth, he becomes enraged and orders him to be killed, making his death look like an accidental drowning. |
| Ha Yingqun | Imperial Astronomer (钦天监) | —N/a | The imperial astronomer, he collaborates with Wei Yanwan to frame Ruyi and Consort Shu, causing the Emperor to distance himself from Ruyi. After the incident involving the death of the 13th Prince, he is expelled from the palace and secretly killed by Chunchan. |
| Steven Thomas Boergadine | Giuseppe Castiglione (Lang Shining) (郎世宁) | —N/a | Originally from Italy, he is a Jesuit painter who serves the Imperial Court. He is an elderly man who has worked for three different emperors and painted the portrait of Qianlong and Ruyi holding hands. |
| Jin Song | Li Jinzhu (李金柱) | —N/a | An imperial guard at the Cold Palace. |
| Wang Liusheng | Imperial Physician Zhao (赵太医) | —N/a | |
| Feng Bao | Imperial Physician Bao (包太医) | —N/a | |
| Wang Zhimin | Imperial Physician Xu (许太医) | —N/a | Consort Jia's trusted doctor. |
| Huang Ningsheng | Imperial Physician Cao (曹太医) | —N/a | |
| Xu Zhiming | Er'tao (二套) | —N/a | |
Eunuchs
| Shen Baoping | Su Peisheng (苏培盛) | Yangxin Hall | The Yongzheng Emperor's senior attendant and Head Eunuch of Yangxin Hall. |
| Huang Ming | Li Yu (李玉) | Yangxin Hall | The Qianlong Emperor's attendant. Diligent and ambitious, he ultimately becomes the Head Eunuch of Yangxin Hall, succeeding Wang Qin. He often helps Ruyi, as she once helped him. He is an old acquaintance of Jiang Yubin and Suoxin, as they come from the same village. He has a crush on Suoxin, and although she appreciates him, she does not reciprocate. |
| Hu Ming | Wang Qin (王钦) | Prince Bao's Mansion; Yangxin Hall | The Qianlong Emperor's senior attendant and Head Eunuch of Yangxin Hall. He is in love with Lianxin and forces her to marry him by agreeing to work for Fuca Langhua. He is often hostile towards Li Yu, as he is jealous of him. Wang Qin is abusive and mistreats Lianxin when they are alone, so Ruyi helps her and Wang Qin is expelled from the palace, becoming a beggar. |
| Jiang Xueming | Jinzhong (进忠) | Yangxin Hall | The Qianlong Emperor's attendant and Li Yu's disciple. Lecherous, ambitious and scheming, he becomes obsessed with Consort Ling since her time as Consort Jia's maid, and hates Ling Yunche because he knows she has not forgotten him. He is later killed by Consort Ling when she realizes that he is no longer useful to her. |
| Zhang Juju | Jinbao (进保) | Yangxin Hall | The Qianlong Emperor's attendant. A kind and diligent eunuch who appreciates Ruyi. |
| Han Yu | Xiao Linzi (小林子) | Yangxin Hall | The Qianlong Emperor's attendant. |
| Li Qi | Sanbao (三宝) | Prince Bao's Mansion; Yanxi Palace; Yikun Palace | Ruyi's senior attendant. |
| Gao Weibo | Xiao Fuzi (小福子) | Yanxi Palace | Ruyi's attendant. |
| Chen Zhuo | Wufu (五福) | Yanxi Palace | Noble Consort Yu's senior attendant. |
| Zhong Weihua | Cheng Han (成翰) | Yongshou Palace; Shoukang Palace; Cining Palace | The Empress Dowager's senior attendant. |
| Ma Bo | Zhao Yitai (赵一泰) | Changchun Palace | Empress Fuca's senior attendant. |
| Liu Zikai | Qian Shuangxi (钱双喜) | Xianfu Palace | Noble Consort Hui's senior attendant. He's a skilled snake charmer. |
| Chen Muyi | Wang Chan (王蟾) | Yongshou Palace | Consort Ling's senior attendant. |
| Wang Peidong | Xiao Lizi (小栗子) | Zhongcui Palace; Xiefang Hall | Formerly Consort Chun's senior attendant, he is moved to Xiefang Hall and ultimately serves Yongji. |
| Yang Shuo | Xu An (徐安) | —N/a | Head Eunuch of the Household Department. |
| Yu Tong | Qin Li (秦立) | —N/a | Eunuch of the Household Department. |
| Yang Yang | Xiao Lüzi (小禄子) | —N/a | Eunuch of the Food Bureau. |
| Zhang Shu | Xiao Anzi (小安子) | —N/a | Eunuch of the Household Department. |
| A Xing | Xiao Leizi (小磊子) | Prince Rong's Mansion | Yongqi's senior attendant. |
| Chang Cheng | Xiao Guizi (小贵子) | | |
| Wang Zhen | Xiao Shunzi (小顺子) | | |
| Ma Xin; Li Pengwu | Xiao Lezi (小乐子) | | |
| Liu Xue | Ma Hanzi (马憨子) | | |

==== Others ====
| Actor | Character | Introduction |
|---|---|---|
| Wang Wei | Uya Maoqian (萨克达·茂倩) | Ling Yunche's wife. The daughter of an official, she marries Ling Yunche, but she looks down on her husband due to her noble background and does not have a good relationship with him. Due to her jealousy, she collaborated with Borjigit Eyinzhu to accuse Ling Yunche of having an affair with Ruyi. Later, Ling Yunche divorces her. |
| Yu Shaoqun | Anji Bosang (安吉波桑) | A highly respected monk, known as the Great Buddhist Master, who came to visit shortly after Ruyi was promoted to the rank of imperial noble consort. Being a handsome young man, he is framed by Consort Jia and falsely accused of having an affair with Ruyi. |
| Zhang Yuxi | Shui Linglong (水玲珑) | A famous courtesan favored by Qianlong Emperor during a tour. She claims she does not sell her body, but her talents. She is later forced by Rongpei to become a nun. |
| Li Guangjie | Prince of the Yu clan (玉氏王) | Ruler of Consort Jia's maiden clan and her first love. He is a mean-spirited man who never loved her and always used her for his own benefit. |
| Fang Xiaoli | Madame Ula Nara (乌拉那拉夫人) | Ruyi's mother. |
| Cai Wenyan | Madame Fuca (富察夫人) | Empress Fuca's mother. She has high expectations for her daughter to bring glory to their clan which puts constant pressure on Empress Fuca and leads to her insecurity. |
| Meng Xiu | Madame Wei (卫夫人) | Consort Ling's mother. A greedy and obnoxious woman, she tries to push her daughter into achieving higher status for her personal gains. She takes the blame for harming Ruyi's children for her daughter, for which she is executed. |
| Song Jiateng | Keliyete Zhaqi (珂里叶特·扎齐) | Noble Consort Yu's nephew. A greedy and hateful man, always seeking to extort money from his aunt. He is manipulated by Consort Ling into framing Hailan for harming Ruyi's children. He later dies under torture. |
| Xu Xiaoning | Wei Zuolu (卫佐祿) | Consort Ling's younger brother. A lazy and untalented man who was always favored by his mother over Consort Ling for being the sole male offspring of their clan. He later reveals his sister's misdeeds. |
| Wu Rige | Borjigin Saisang Gendun (孛儿只斤·赛桑根敦) | Ruler of the Mongol Khorchin tribe and Consort Yu's father. |
| Liu Jun | Han A'ti (寒阿提) | Ruler of the Han tribe and Consort Rong's father. |
| Wang Leifang | Han Qi (寒企) | Consort Rong's first love and late fiancé. He is buried in an avalanche as he chases the caravan that was transporting her to the Forbidden City. She deeply regrets his death and never forgets him. |
| Liu Yupu | Bai'erguosishe Demuqiseyinchake (拜尔果斯·德穆齐塞音察克) | Concubine Ke's father. |
| Zhang Xiaolin | Anduo (安多) | Anji Bosang's disciple. |
| Huang Deyi | Tian Jun (田俊) | Nursemaid Tian's son and Hu Yunjiao's brother. |
| Fang Yuchen | Tao'er (桃儿) | Madame Wei's maid. |
| - | Septeng Baljur | Prince of the Khorchin Tribe and Jingse's husband. It is known he ignores Jingse and prefers to spend time with his concubines, making her unhappy in their marriage. |
| Liu Lianzi (Note: Cameo by the original author; most of Liu Lianzi's scenes were deleted from the final cut.) | Lady Uya (乌雅氏) | Primary Consort of Prince Xian of the First Rank (諴亲王嫡福晋) The Qianlong Emperor's paternal aunt-by-marriage and wife of Prince Xian of the First Rank. |

== Production ==
=== Crew ===
The series is directed by Wang Jun, produced by Huang Lan, and written by the author of the original novel Liu Lianzi. It also employed William Chang and Tongxun Chen as their overall style director, Han Zhong as art director and Peng Xuejun as cinematography director.

=== Development ===
Liu Lianzi started to write the original novel in 2011, and changed her work several times to achieve the best version in the next five years.

New Classics Media picked up the project for a 90–episodes series (later shortened to 87), with a ¥300 million budget, making it the most expensive television series in China.

=== Casting ===
On January 14, 2016, it was announced that Zhou Xun will play the leading role of Empress Nara. The role of the Qianlong Emperor, the male lead, was announced to be portrayed by Wallace Huo on May 27. On August 3, actors Janine Chang, Vivian Wu, Dong Jie, Tong Yao, Jing Chao, Xin Zhilei, Li Chun, Zeng Yixuan and Chen Haoyu were cast in major supporting roles for the drama. Around 5,000 actors competed for roles in the drama.

=== Filming ===
Shooting began on August 23, 2016 and took place in various locations including Hengdian World Studios, Beijing, Inner Mongolia and Hangzhou. The series completed filming on May 5, 2017.

== Original soundtrack ==
| No. | Title | Lyrics | Music | Singers | Length |
|---|---|---|---|---|---|
| 1. | "Double Shadow (双影)" (Ending theme; 47–87) | Yi Jiayang | Ding Wei; Jim Lee | A-mei; Sandy Lam |
| 2. | "Incense and Fleeting Years (沉香流年)" (Opening theme; 1–46) | Yi Ming | Yi Ming; Wang Yaoguang | Lei Jia |
| 3. | "Like the Fragrance of Plum Blossoms We Once Knew (梅香如故)" (Ending theme; 1–38, 40–46) | Lü Jingye | Chen Shimei | Mao Buyi; Zhou Shen |
| 4. | "Things Stay The Same, But People Have Changed (人非物是)" (Opening theme; 47–87) | | Chen Shimei | Asia Philharmonic Orchestra |
| 5. | "Worries (心事)" (Ending theme; 39) | Lü Jingye | Yan Qing | Deng Tongtian |

== Reception ==
The series received mixed responses from viewers.

Many felt underwhelmed by the unaggressive heroine, who was not able to fight the villains even in the second half of the drama, thus making her character design flawed and unconvincing. The series was criticized for its anticlimactic story, depressive tone and slow pacing in the early episodes. Critics felt that it was ironic and unbelievable for the female protagonist to pursue monogamy in a highly feudalistic context.

The series has received criticism over the age of the leading actors, with viewers considering they made unconvincing teenagers and criticizing the producers for not using younger actors to portray the lovestruck teens. Viewers were also divided over the lack of dubbing for Zhou Xun's 15-year-old character, as they felt that her voice was "too raspy" and "mature".

However, there was also praise for the series. Zhang Hanyue said that "the show becomes more and more heart-tugging as the story goes deeper". Many viewers agree that Ruyi bears many characteristics of a modern female. Vogue China commented that the series actually recorded "the failure of a high-end girl" because what Ruyi had been pursuing was spiritual connections with her spouse; and such a pursuit represents the taste and ideal of the modern middle class. Critics agree that the series introduces a new light and narrative to palace dramas, deviating from the existing patterns of treacherous harem games. The series won acclaim for its exquisite props, lavish sets, and stellar cast.

=== Censorship ===
On 21 January 2019, after Beijing Daily criticized palace-intrigue dramas for their negative influence, several such series, including Ruyi’s Royal Love in the Palace, were temporarily removed from Chinese streaming services, though the series remained available on overseas platforms. On 27 September 2020, it was again removed from streaming platforms in mainland China.

=== Ratings ===
Dragon Television ratings
| Broadcast date | Episode | Ratings (%) | Audience share (%) | Rank (excluding CCTV) | Rank (including CCTV) |
| December 25, 2018 | 1–4 | 0.247 | 2.86 | 3 | 9 |
| December 26, 2018 | 5–8 | 0.306 | 3.42 | 1 | 4 |
| December 27, 2018 | 9–12 | 0.359 | 3.93 | 1 | 3 |
| December 28, 2018 | 13–16 | 0.291 | 3.20 | 2 | 6 |
| December 29, 2018 | 17–20 | 0.368 | 3.69 | 1 | 5 |
| December 30, 2018 | 21–24 | 0.455 | 3.79 | 1 | 3 |
| December 31, 2018 | 25–28 | 0.556 | 4.56 | 1 | 3 |
| January 1, 2019 | 29–32 | 0.557 | 4.36 | 1 | 3 |
| January 2, 2019 | 33–36 | 0.536 | 5.77 | 1 | 2 |
| January 3, 2019 | 37–40 | 0.467 | 5.22 | 1 | 2 |
| January 4, 2019 | 41–44 | 0.553 | Not available | 1 | 1 |
| January 5, 2019 | 45–48 | 0.550 | Not available | 1 | 1 |
| January 6, 2019 | 49–52 | 0.515 | Not available | 1 | 1 |
| January 7, 2019 | 53–56 | 0.551 | 5.99 | 1 | 2 |
| January 8, 2019 | 57–60 | 0.496 | 5.52 | 1 | 2 |
| January 9, 2019 | 61–64 | 0.500 | 5.29 | 1 | 3 |
| January 10, 2019 | 65–68 | 0.472 | 5.16 | 1 | 2 |
| January 11, 2019 | 69–72 | 0.482 | 5.05 | 1 | 2 |
| January 12, 2019 | 73–76 | 0.554 | 4.87 | 1 | 2 |
| January 13, 2019 | 77–80 | 0.611 | 5.38 | 1 | 1 |
| January 14, 2019 | 81–84 | 0.610 | 6.61 | 1 | 2 |
| January 15, 2019 | 85–87 | 0.623 | 6.29 | 1 | 1 |
| Average ratings | | 0.485 | – | – | – |

Jiangsu Television ratings
| Broadcast date | Episode | Ratings (%) | Audience share (%) | Rank (excluding CCTV) | Rank (including CCTV) |
| December 25, 2018 | 1–4 | 0.181 | 2.115 | 4 | 11 |
| December 26, 2018 | 5–8 | 0.178 | 2.011 | 4 | 10 |
| December 27, 2018 | 9–12 | 0.171 | 1.884 | 5 | 12 |
| December 28, 2018 | 13–16 | 0.208 | 2.313 | 5 | 11 |
| December 29, 2018 | 17–20 | 0.200 | Not available | | |
| December 30, 2018 | 21–24 | 0.292 | 2.437 | 3 | 6 |
| December 31, 2018 | 25–28 | 0.295 | 2.431 | 3 | 6 |
| January 1, 2019 | 29–32 | 0.298 | 2.343 | 3 | 5 |
| January 2, 2019 | 33–36 | 0.231 | 2.354 | 4 | 9 |
| January 3, 2019 | 37–40 | 0.170 | Not available | | |
| January 4, 2019 | 41–44 | 0.186 | Not available | | |
| January 5, 2019 | 45–48 | 0.266 | Not available | | |
| January 6, 2019 | 49–52 | 0.223 | Not available | | |
| January 7, 2019 | 53–56 | 0.215 | 2.314 | 3 | 11 |
| January 8, 2019 | 57–60 | 0.215 | 2.315 | 3 | 11 |
| January 9, 2019 | 61–64 | 0.216 | 2.186 | 3 | 10 |
| January 10, 2019 | 65–68 | 0.181 | 1.948 | 5 | 11 |
| January 11, 2019 | 69–72 | 0.180 | 1.837 | 6 | 12 |
| January 12, 2019 | 73–76 | 0.189 | 1.728 | 4 | 11 |
| January 13, 2019 | 77–80 | 0.206 | 1.866 | 5 | 11 |
| January 14, 2019 | 81–84 | 0.208 | 2.221 | 3 | 9 |
| January 15, 2019 | 85–87 | 0.265 | 2.826 | 2 | 8 |
| Average ratings | | 0.217 | – | – | – |

=== Awards and nominations ===
| Award | Category | Nomination | Result | Ref. |
|---|---|---|---|---|
| 24th Huading Awards | Best Director | Wang Jun | Nominated | |
| 24th Huading Awards | Best Actor | Wallace Huo | Nominated | |
| 12th Tencent Video Star Awards | Best Web Drama | Ruyi's Royal Love in the Palace | Won | |
| Golden Bud – The Third Network Film And Television Festival | Top 10 Web Drama | Ruyi's Royal Love in the Palace | Won | |
| Influence of Recreational Responsibilities Awards | Web Drama of the Year | Ruyi's Royal Love in the Palace | Won | |
| 2nd Asian Academy Creative Awards | Best Leading Actress – China | Zhou Xun | Won | |

== International broadcast ==
On 10 June 2016, Fox Networks Group Asia (FNG) acquired global rights to the series outside mainland China. It was the first epic period drama secured by FNG for markets outside China, and was carried by STAR Chinese Channel (SCC), the flagship Chinese general entertainment channel, starting 20 August 2018 in selected countries and re-run on August 6, 2019 in all countries.

From 27 November 2018, it aired on Fox Taiwan. From 27 December 2018, it aired on Talentvision. To date it has debuted in 18 countries and regions, including the United States, Canada, Australia, Japan and the Philippines.

| Region | Network | Dates | Notes |
|---|---|---|---|
| United States | Fox Networks Group channels | August 20, 2018 | Dubbed in English. |
| Hong Kong and Southeast Asia | Star Chinese Channel | August 20, 2018 – December 18, 2018 | |
| Hong Kong | TVB Jade | February 4, 2019 – March 19, 2019 | Monday to Saturday (120 minutes); Sunday (60 minutes). |
| Hong Kong | myTV SUPER | August 20, 2018 – October 15, 2018 | |
| Vietnam | HTV7 | September 1, 2018 | Monday to Saturday at 13:00. Dubbed in Vietnamese. |
| Vietnam | Hanoi Radio Television | March 26, 2019 – June 20, 2019 | Every day at 13:00. Original language with voiceover Vietnamese. |
| Vietnam | Vie DRAMAS | March 23, 2019 – June 17, 2019 | Every day at 19:00. Dubbed in Vietnamese. |
| Taiwan | Fox Taiwan | November 27, 2018 | |
| Taiwan | iQIYI Taiwan | August 20, 2018 – October 15, 2018 | |
| Taiwan | CTV | October 2, 2020 | Monday to Friday at 20:00 (120 minutes). |
| Taiwan | Chung T'ien Television | February 18, 2021 | Monday to Friday at 21:00 (60 minutes). |
| Canada | Talentvision | December 27, 2018 | Dubbed in English. |
| Japan | WOWOW TV | May 29, 2019 | |
| Malaysia | Astro Shuang Xing; Astro Shuang Xing HD | August 20, 2018 – November 14, 2018 | Monday to Sunday at 20:00 - 21:00 |
| Malaysia | April 5, 2020 | Every day at 19:00 (60 minutes). Re-run. | |
| Malaysia | 8TV | July 6, 2021 | Monday to Friday at 18:00 (58 minutes). |
| Thailand | Channel 3 | March 15, 2023 | Monday to Friday after 00:00. Dubbed in Thai. |
