= Dowager Noble Consort Wan =

Consort of the Qianlong Emperor of the Qing dynasty

Noble Consort Wan
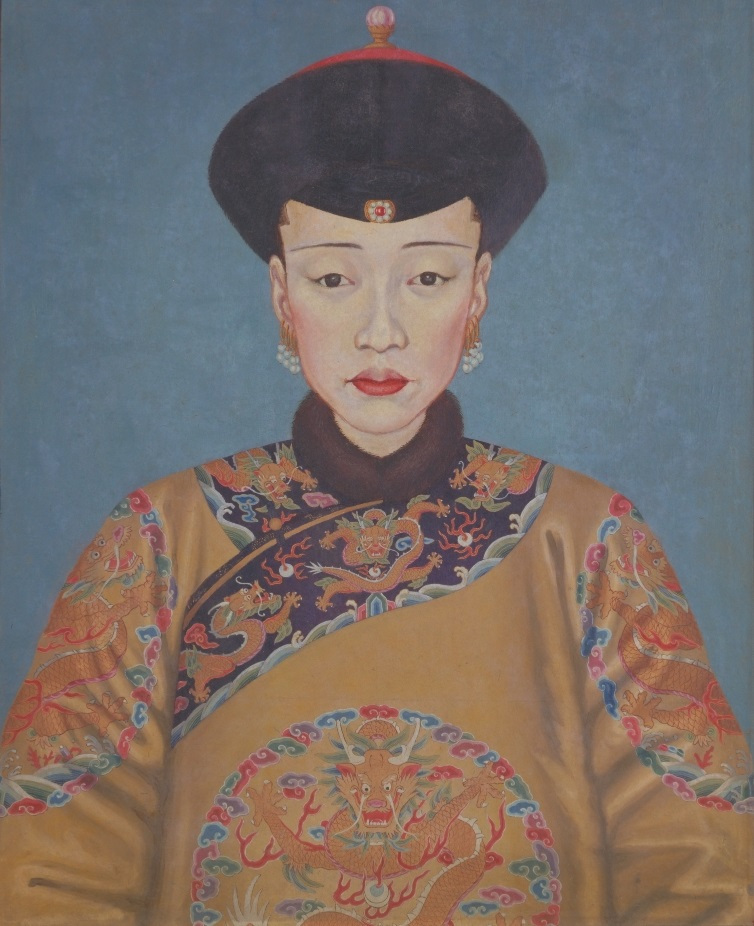
- Qing Dynasty portrait of Noble Consort Wan
- Born: 1 February 1716 (康熙五十五年 十二月 二十日)
- Died: 10 March 1807 (aged 91) (嘉慶十二年 二月 二日); Forbidden City
- Burial: Yu Mausoleum, Eastern Qing tombs
- Spouse: Qianlong Emperor (died 1799)
- House: Chen (陳; by birth); Aisin Gioro (by marriage)

Dowager Noble Consort Wan
- Traditional Chinese: 婉貴太妃
- Simplified Chinese: 婉贵太妃
Transcriptions
Standard Mandarin
- Hanyu Pinyin: Wǎn Guìtàifēi

Noble Consort Wan (1 February 1716 – 10 March 1807), of the Chen clan of Han ethnicity, was a consort of the Qianlong Emperor of the Qing dynasty. She was five years his junior.

== Life ==
=== Family background ===
Noble Consort Wan's personal name was not recorded in history.

- Father: Tingzhang (廷璋)

=== Kangxi era ===
The future Noble Consort Wan was born on the 20th day of the 12th lunar month in the 55th year of the reign of the Kangxi Emperor, which translates to 1 February 1717 in the Gregorian calendar.

=== Yongzheng era ===
It is not known when Lady Chen became a mistress of Hongli, the fourth son of the Yongzheng Emperor.

=== Qianlong era ===
The Yongzheng Emperor died on 8 October 1735 and was succeeded by Hongli, who was enthroned as the Qianlong Emperor. On 8 November 1735, Lady Chen was granted the title "First Attendant". She was elevated in 1737 to "Noble Lady", in May or June 1749 to "Concubine Wan", and in December 1794 or January 1795 to "Consort Wan". She didn't give birth to any children.

=== Jiaqing era ===
The Qianlong Emperor died on 7 February 1799. His 15th son, the Jiaqing Emperor, elevated Lady Chen to "Dowager Noble Consort Wan" on 27 May 1801. In his imperial edict, the Jiaqing Emperor mentioned that Lady Chen deserved the honour because she had served his father for a long time and was still in good health at a very old age.

Lady Chen died on 10 March 1807 and was interred in the Yu Mausoleum of the Eastern Qing tombs. She was the longest surviving consort of the Qianlong Emperor at the time of her death.

== Titles ==
- During the reign of the Kangxi Emperor (r. 1661–1722):
  - Lady Chen (from 1 February 1717)
- During the reign of the Yongzheng Emperor (r. 1722–1735):
  - Mistress
- During the reign of the Qianlong Emperor (r. 1735–1796):
  - First Attendant (常在; from 8 November 1735), seventh rank consort
  - Noble Lady (貴人; from 1737), sixth rank consort
  - Concubine Wan (婉嬪; from May/June 1749), fifth rank consort
  - Consort Wan (婉妃; from December 1794 or January 1795), fourth rank consort
- During the reign of the Jiaqing Emperor (r. 1796–1820):
  - Dowager Noble Consort Wan (婉貴太妃; from 27 May 1801), third rank consort

== In fiction and popular culture ==
- Portrayed by Wang Xinhui in Story of Yanxi Palace (2018)
- Portrayed by Cao Xiwen in Ruyi's Royal Love in the Palace (2018)

== See also ==
- Ranks of imperial consorts in China#Qing
- Royal and noble ranks of the Qing dynasty
