= Xiamen University of Technology =

Public university in Xiamen, China

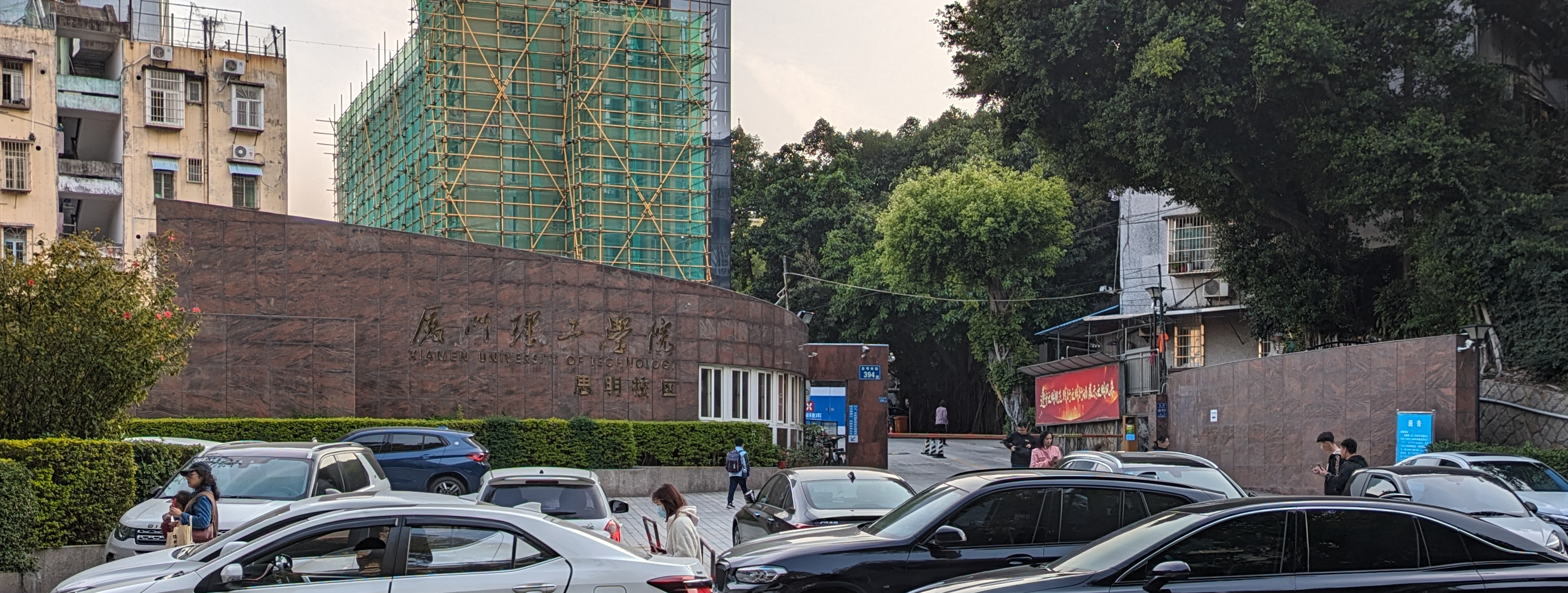
Siming campus

The Xiamen University of Technology (XMUT; Chinese: 厦门理工学院; lit. 'Xiamen Polytechnic College') is a provincial public university located in Xiamen, Fujian, China.

== History ==
Founded in 1981, at around the same time as the Xiamen Special Economic Zone, it was originally known as Lujiang Industrial University. the university status was conferred by Xi Jinping, current General Secretary of the Chinese Communist Party, when he was Governor of Fujian Province. It is a public university which since 2013 has been jointly administered by Xiamen City Government and Fujian Provincial Government, at which time it was also designated a "key provincial university".

The university has created a joint-venture called Digital Innovation College with partnering universities; Ming Chuan University and Central University.

== Campuses ==
The university's main campus is located in Jimei District, although it continues to maintain a smaller campus in downtown Xiamen's Siming District. The combined campus area is more than 120 hectares. (24.621963°N 118.086333°E).

== Students ==
XMUT has a total enrollment of 21,000 domestic students. In addition, since the 1990s it has hosted international students from all over the world. The university currently offers 63 undergraduate and graduate programs.

== Faculty ==
It currently has around 1000 faculty members, including approximately 50 overseas teachers.

== International cooperation ==
XMUT currently has cooperation agreements with more than 30 universities and corporations in over 20 countries. It offers more than 20 programs which allow credit transfer in partnership with 10 overseas universities, and offers joint degrees at undergraduate and graduate level in cooperation with universities in Britain, Canada, the United States, Malaysia and the Philippines. In addition, XMUT has cooperation agreements with 18 institutes of higher education in Taiwan.

== Awards ==
In 2008 XMUT was named as one of the "Top Ten Fastest Growing Universities in China". Since 2010 it has been one of only three universities in Fujian to be part of the Ministry of Education-sponsored "Outstanding Engineers' Training Program", and the only university in Fujian to be part of the Ministry of Science and Technology's "Innovation Engineering Program". In 2011 it also became the only university in Fujian to win the "National Innovation and Entrepreneurship Education Award".
