= Consorts of the Yongzheng Emperor =

Qing Chinese consorts from 1722 to 1735

The Yongzheng Emperor of China's Qing dynasty had eight consorts, including two empresses, two imperial noble consorts, three consorts and one concubine. They are classified according to their posthumous names.

== Empresses ==
1. Empress Xiaojingxian (孝敬憲皇后), of the Ula-Nara clan (烏拉那拉氏; 28 June 1681 – 29 October 1731), personal name Duoqimuli (多棋木理)
  Primary Consort (嫡福晉) → Empress (皇后) → Empress Xiaojing (孝敬皇后) → Empress Xiaojingxian (孝敬憲皇后)
2. Empress Xiaoshengxian (孝聖憲皇后), of the Niohuru clan (鈕祜祿氏; 12 January 1692 – 2 March 1777)
  Mistress (格格) → Consort Xi (熹妃) → Noble Consort Xi (熹貴妃) → Empress Dowager Chongqing (崇慶皇太后) (Note: Specifically, she was known as "Holy Mother, Empress Dowager Chongqing" (聖母崇慶皇太后).) → Empress Xiaoshengxian (孝聖憲皇后)

== Imperial noble consorts ==
1. Imperial Noble Consort Dunsu (敦肅皇貴妃), of the Nian clan (年氏; d. 23 December 1725)
  Secondary Consort (側福晉) → Noble Consort (貴妃) → Imperial Noble Consort (皇貴妃) → Imperial Noble Consort Dunsu (敦肅皇貴妃)
2. Imperial Noble Consort Chunque (純愨皇貴妃), of the Geng clan (耿氏; December 1689/January 1690 – 27 January 1785)
  Mistress (格格) → Concubine Yu (裕嬪) → Consort Yu (裕妃) → Dowager Noble Consort Yu (裕貴太妃) → Dowager Imperial Noble Consort (皇貴太妃) → Imperial Noble Consort Chunque (純愨皇貴妃)

== Consorts ==
1. Consort Qi (齊妃), of the Li clan (李氏; 1676 – 31 May 1739)
  Secondary Consort (側福晉) → Consort Qi (齊妃) → Dowager Consort Qi (齊太妃)
2. Consort Qian (謙妃), of the Liugiya clan (劉佳氏; 1714 – 17 June 1767), personal name Xiangyu (香玉)
  Second Class Attendant (答應) → Noble Lady (貴人) → Concubine Qian (謙嬪) → Dowager Consort Qian (謙太妃)
3. Consort Ning (寧妃), of the Wu clan (武氏; d. 25 June 1734), personal name Lingyuan (令媛)
  Concubine Ning (寧嬪) → Consort Ning (寧妃)

== Concubines ==
1. Concubine Mao (懋嬪), of the Song clan (宋氏; 1677 – October/November 1730)
  Mistress (格格) → Concubine Mao (懋嬪)
