= Consort Song =

Consort Song may refer to:

- Consort song, English song form of the late 16th and early 17th centuries

== People ==
- Empress Jingyin (died 82), concubine of Emperor Zhang of Han
- Empress Song (Han dynasty) (died 178), wife of Emperor Ling of Han
- Song Fujin (died 945), wife of Li Bian (Emperor Liezu of Southern Tang)
- Empress Song (Song dynasty) (952–995), wife of Emperor Taizu
- Queen Jeongsun (Danjong) (1440–1521), wife of Danjong of Joseon
- Concubine Mao (1677–1730), concubine of the Yongzheng Emperor
