= Hongzhou, Prince He =

Manchu prince of the Qing dynasty (1712-1770)

Hongzhou
- Prince He of the First Rank 和碩和親王
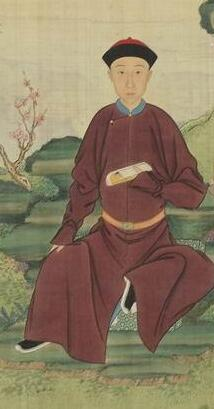
- Portrait of Hongzhou

Prince He of the First Rank
- Tenure: 20 March 1733 – 2 September 1770
- Predecessor: peerage created
- Successor: Yongbi
- Born: 5 January 1712
- Died: 2 September 1770 (aged 58)
- Consorts: Lady Ujaku
- Issue: Yongbi, Prince Heqin of the First Rank; Yongbin; Yonghuan; Yongkun; Yongzeng; Princess Hewan of the Second Rank
Names
- Aisin Gioro Hongzhou (愛新覺羅·弘晝)
Posthumous name
- Prince Hegong of the First Rank (和恭親王)
- House: Aisin Gioro
- Father: Yongzheng Emperor
- Mother: Imperial Noble Consort Chunque

Hongzhou
- Traditional Chinese: 弘晝
- Simplified Chinese: 弘昼
Transcriptions
Standard Mandarin
- Hanyu Pinyin: Hóngzhòu
- Wade–Giles: Hung-chou

Hongzhou (Manchu:ᡥᡠᠩᠵᡝᠣ, Mölendroff: hungjeo; 5 January 1712 – 2 September 1770), formally known as Prince He, was a Manchu prince of the Qing dynasty.

== Life ==
Hongzhou was born in the Manchu Aisin Gioro clan as the fifth son of the Yongzheng Emperor. His mother was Imperial Noble Consort Chunque (纯悫皇贵妃) of the Geng (耿) clan, who was the daughter of Geng Dejin (耿德金), a guanling (內管領) in the Qing imperial court.

Hongzhou was granted the title "Prince He of the First Rank" (和碩和親王) in 1733. In his childhood, he was adopted and raised by Empress Xiaojingxian. Unlike his brothers Hongli and Hongshi, Hongzhou chose to avoid being involved in rivalry over the succession to their father's throne. He was known to have pretended to be crazy and feminine.

== Family ==
Primary Consort

- Imperial Princess Consort Hegong, of the Ujaku clan (和恭亲王福晋 烏扎庫氏)
  - Yongying (永瑛; 17 May 1731 – 28 July 1732), first son
  - Yongbi, Prince Heqin of the First Rank (和勤親王 永璧/和勤亲王 永壁; 23 July 1733 – 4 April 1772), second son
  - Princess Hewan of the Second Rank (和碩和婉公主; 24 July 1734 – 2 May 1760), first daughter
    - Married Deleke (德勒克; d. 1794) of the Barin Borjigit clan on 13 January 1751
  - Yongbin, General of the First Rank (鎮國將軍 永瑸; 24 December 1735 – 2 February 1799), fourth son
  - Fifth son (14 January 1739 – 20 June 1739)
  - Yongkun, Duke of the Fourth Rank (不入八分輔國公 永琨; 11 March 1743 – 16 February 1803), seventh son
  - Yongzeng (永璔; 19 September 1745 – 5 July 1768), eighth son

Secondary Consort

- Secondary consort, of the Janggiya clan (側福晉 章佳氏)
  - Third son (22 May 1734 – 31 December 1734)
- Secondary consort, of the Cui clan (側福晉 崔氏)
  - Yonghuan, General of the First Rank (鎮國將軍 永瑍; 7 July 1740 – 3 November 1783), sixth son

== In fiction and popular culture ==
- Portrayed by Wang Xiao in Ruyi's Royal Love in the Palace (2018)
- Portrayed by Hong Yao in Story of Yanxi Palace (2018)

== See also ==
- Royal and noble ranks of the Qing dynasty
- Ranks of imperial consorts in China § Qing
