= Yunli =

Prince of Qing China (1697–1739)

- Prince Guo of the First Rank 和碩果親王
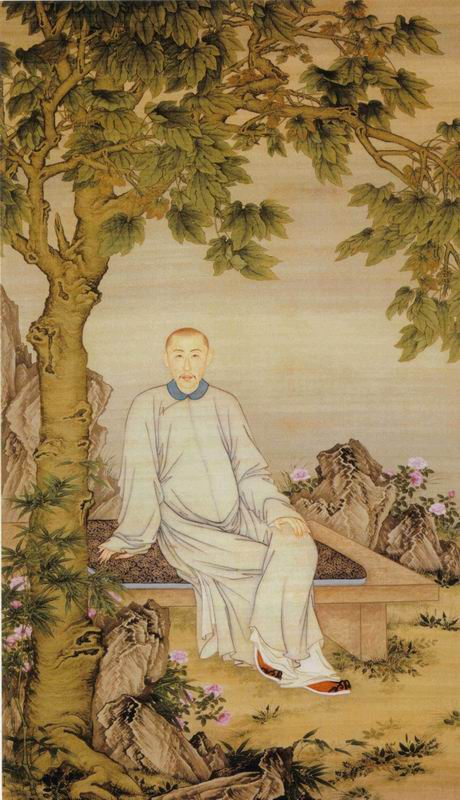
- Portrait by Jiang Tingxi

Prince Guo of the First Rank
- Tenure: 20 March 1728 – 21 March 1738
- Predecessor: peerage created
- Successor: Hongyan

Prince Guo of the Second Rank
- Tenure: 16 April 1723 – 20 March 1728
- Born: Aisin Gioro Yinli (愛新覺羅·胤禮); 24 March 1697
- Died: 21 March 1738 (aged 40)
- Consorts: Lady Niohuru
Names
- Aisin Gioro Yunli (愛新覺羅·允禮)
Posthumous name
- Prince Guoyi of the First Rank (果毅親王)
- House: Aisin Gioro
- Father: Kangxi Emperor
- Mother: Consort Chunyuqin

Yunli
- Traditional Chinese: 允禮
- Simplified Chinese: 允礼
Transcriptions
Standard Mandarin
- Hanyu Pinyin: Yǔnlǐ

Yinli
- Traditional Chinese: 胤禮
- Simplified Chinese: 胤礼
Transcriptions
Standard Mandarin
- Hanyu Pinyin: Yìnlǐ

Yunli (24 March 1697 – 21 March 1738), born Yinli, formally known as Prince Guo, was a Manchu prince of the Qing dynasty.

== Life ==
Yinli was born in the Aisin Gioro clan as the 17th son of the Kangxi Emperor. His mother was Consort Qin (勤妃), a Han Chinese with the family name Chen.

Consort Qin was also known as Consort Chunyuqin (純裕勤太妃). The Chen family were originally Han baoyi of the Imperial Household Department's Bordered Yellow banner. It was Qing court protocol to put any non-Manchu consort and her close male relatives like brothers and cousins into a Manchu banner if they were a Han bannermen. Chen and her brothers and cousins were put into the Manchu Yellow Bordered Banner effectively changing their ethnicity from Han to Manchu in the eyes of the Qing court. Their surname was Manchurized from Chen to Chenjia (陳佳). Gao Bin (高斌) who was from another Han family that was put into the same Manchu banner married another woman from the Chen clan.

Yinli excelled in academics since childhood. Unlike most of his brothers, he was never involved in any of the struggles for succession to the throne. He was intelligent and cautious, and had his share of political achievements. He was also good in calligraphy and poetry. He also enjoyed touring the country and had visited almost all the famous mountains in Sichuan.

In 1722, Yinli's fourth brother, Yinzhen, ascended the throne after the death of their father, and became historically known as the Yongzheng Emperor. Yinli changed his name to "Yunli" (允禮) to avoid naming taboo because the Chinese character for "Yin" (胤) in "Yinli" is the same as the one in the Yongzheng Emperor's personal name, Yinzhen (胤禛). In April that year, Yunli was granted the title "Prince Guo of the Second Rank" (多羅果郡王) and placed in charge of administering the institution of scholars. In 1725, Yunli was awarded a higher allowance for honesty and diligence. In February 1728, he was promoted to "Prince Guo of the First Rank" (果親王). He was later appointed to the Grand Council and given greater responsibilities, such as escorting the Dalai Lama back to Tibet and inspecting military forces stationed along the route. Yunli was known to be a patron and scholar of Tibetan Buddhism.

When the Yongzheng Emperor became seriously ill, Yunli was tasked with supporting the heir to the throne, Hongli. The Yongzheng Emperor died in 1735 and was succeeded by Hongli, who became historically known as the Qianlong Emperor. During the Qianlong Emperor's reign, Yunli was empowered with more authority and given more duties with commensurate recognition.

Yunli died in 1739 at the age of 41. He had two children (a son and a daughter) but both of them died prematurely. His princely title was inherited by Hongyan (弘瞻), the Yongzheng Emperor's sixth son, who was adopted as Yunli's heir.

== Family ==
Primary Consort

- Imperial Princess Consort Guoyi, of the Niohuru clan (果毅亲王福晋 鈕祜祿氏)
  Titles: Primary Consort of the Seventeenth Prince (第十七王子福晋), Princess Consort Guo of the Second Rank (果郡王福晋), Imperial Princess Consort Guo of the First Rank (果亲王福晋), Imperial Princess Consort Guoyi of the First Rank (果毅亲王福晋)

Secondary Consort

- Secondary consort, of the Meng clan (側福晉 孟氏)
  Titles: Secondary Consort to the Seventeenth Prince (第十七王子侧妃), Secondary Consort to Prince Guo of the Second Rank (果郡王侧妃), Secondary Consort to Prince Guo of the First Rank (果亲王侧妃), Secondary Consort Guoyi of the First Rank (果毅亲王侧妃)
  - First son (10 May 1732 – 25 November 1732)
  - First daughter (14 January 1735 – 19 July 1735)

== In fiction and popular culture ==
- Portrayed by Li Dongxue in Empresses in the Palace (2011)
- Portrayed by Du Chun in Palace II (2012)

== See also ==
- Prince Guo
- Royal and noble ranks of the Qing dynasty
- Ranks of imperial consorts in China#Qing
