= Imperial Noble Consort Chunque =

Consort of Yongzheng Emperor

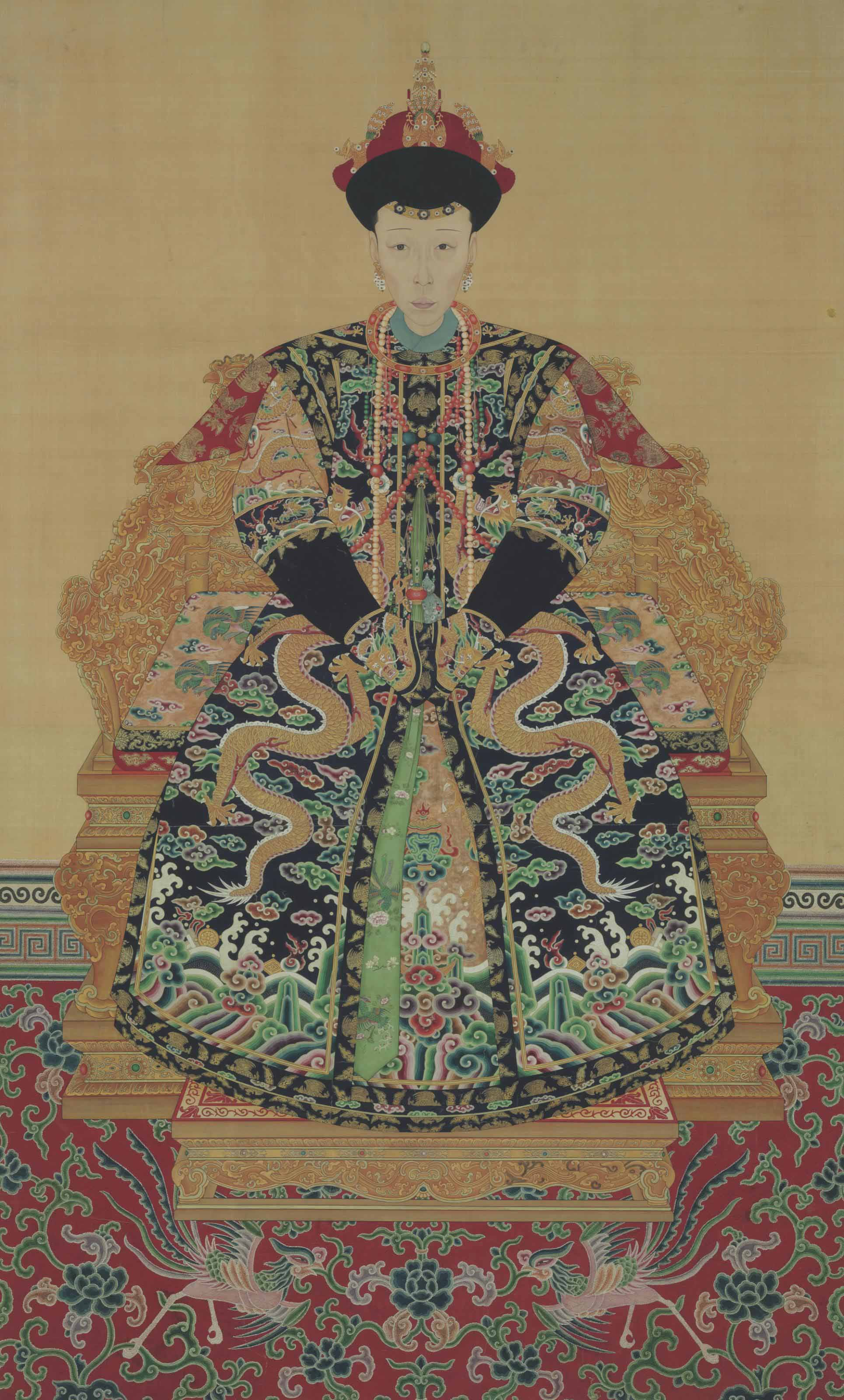
- Born: December 1689/January 1690
- Died: 27 January 1785; Forbidden City
- Burial: Tai Mausoleum, Western Qing tombs
- Spouse: Yongzheng Emperor (m. 1704; died 1735)
- Issue: Hongzhou, Prince He
- House: Geng (耿; by birth); Aisin Gioro (by marriage)

Imperial Noble Consort Chunque
- Traditional Chinese: 純愨皇貴妃
- Simplified Chinese: 纯悫皇贵妃
Transcriptions
Standard Mandarin
- Hanyu Pinyin: Chúnquè huángguìfēi

Imperial Noble Consort Chunque (simplified Chinese: 纯悫皇贵妃; traditional Chinese: 純愨皇貴妃; pinyin: Chúnquè huángguìfēi; December 1689 or January 1690 – 27 January 1785), from the Geng clan of Han ethnicity, was a consort of the Yongzheng Emperor of the Qing dynasty.

== Life ==
=== Family background ===
Imperial Noble Consort Chunque came from Han Chinese Geng clan (耿氏). Her personal name is unknown.

- Father: Dejin (德金), served as an official in the Ministry of Internal Affairs (内管领).

=== Kangxi era ===
Lady Geng was born in twelfth lunar month of twenty eighth year of Kangxi Emperor, which translates to December 1689 in the Gregorian calendar. In 1704, she became a mistress of Kangxi Emperor's fourth son. On 5 January 1712, she gave birth to Yinzhen's fifth son, Hongzhou.

=== Yongzheng era ===
The Kangxi Emperor died on 20 December 1722 and was succeeded by Yinzhen, who was enthroned as the Yongzheng Emperor. In 1723, Lady Geng was given a title of "Concubine Yu" (裕嫔; "yu" meaning "prosperous"). In 1730, she was promoted to "Consort Yu" (裕妃).

=== Qianlong era ===
The Yongzheng Emperor died on 8 October 1735 and was succeeded by Hongli, who was enthroned as the Qianlong Emperor. The same year she was elevated to "Dowager Noble Consort Yu" (裕贵太妃). After the death of Empress Dowager Chongqing in 1778, Dowager Noble Consort Yu was promoted to "Dowager Imperial Noble Consort Yu" (裕皇貴太妃). She died of illness on 27 January 1785 at the age of ninety six. She was posthumously granted the title "Imperial Noble Consort Chunque" (纯悫皇贵妃, "chunque" meaning "pure and honest"). She was interred in the Tai Mausoleum in Western Qing tombs. She is the longest surviving consort of Yongzheng Emperor.

== Titles ==
- During the reign of the Kangxi Emperor (r. 1661–1722):
  - Lady Geng (耿氏; from December 1689)
  - Mistress (格格; from 1704)
- During the reign of the Yongzheng Emperor (r. 1722–1735):
  - Concubine Yu (裕嬪; from 1722), fifth rank consort
  - Consort Yu (裕妃; from 1730), fourth rank consort
- During the reign of the Qianlong Emperor (r. 1735–1796):
  - Dowager Noble Consort Yu (裕贵太妃; from 1735/1736), third rank consort
  - Dowager Imperial Noble Consort Yu (裕皇貴太妃), second rank consort
  - Imperial Noble Consort Chunque (纯悫皇贵妃; from 28 January 1785)

== Issue ==
- As mistress:
  - Hongzhou, Prince Hegong of the First Rank (和硕和恭亲王 弘昼;5 January 1712 - September 1770)

== In fiction and popular culture ==
- Portrayed by Li Yijuan in Empresses in the Palace
- Portrayed by Bai Shan in Story of Yanxi Palace
- Portrayed by Jenny Zhang in Palace 2

== See also ==
- Ranks of imperial consorts in China § Qing
- Royal and noble ranks of the Qing dynasty
