= Consort Qian =

Imperial consort of the Yongzheng Emperor

Liugiya Xiangyu
- Consort Qian
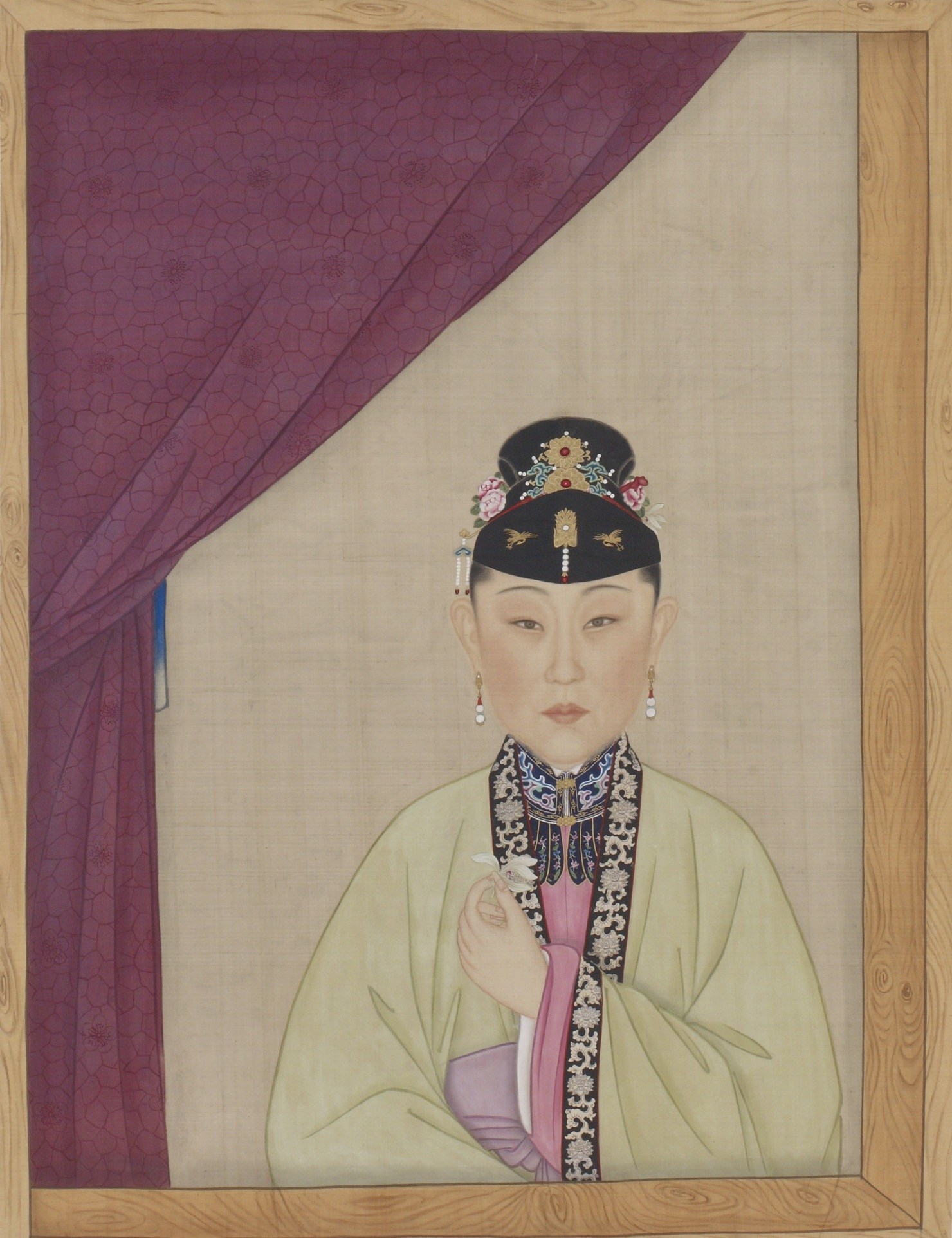
- Portrait of Consort Qian
- Born: 1714
- Died: 17 June 1767 (aged 52–53); Forbidden City
- Burial: Tai Mausoleum, Western Qing tombs
- Spouse: Yongzheng Emperor (m. 1729; died 1735)
- Issue: Hongyan, Prince Guogong of the Second Rank
- House: Liu (劉; by birth); Aisin Gioro (by marriage)

Consort Qian
- Traditional Chinese: 謙妃
- Simplified Chinese: 谦妃
Transcriptions
Standard Mandarin
- Hanyu Pinyin: Qiān Fēi

Consort Qian (simplified Chinese: 谦妃; traditional Chinese: 謙妃; pinyin: Qiān Fēi; 1714 – 17 June 1767), a member of Han Chinese Liu clan, was a consort of Yongzheng Emperor.

== Life ==
=== Family background ===
Consort Qian was a member of Han Chinese Liu clan, later manchurised to "Liugiya". Her personal name was Xiangyu (香玉, literally: Tuberose)

Father: Liu Man (刘满), an official in the Ministry of Internal Affairs (内管领, pinyin: neiguanling)

=== Kangxi era ===
The future Consort Qian was born in 1714.

=== Yongzheng era ===
In 1729, lady Liu entered the Forbidden City at the age of fifteen, and was given the title of "Second Class Female Attendant Liu" (刘答应). In the following year, she was promoted to "Noble Lady Liu" (刘贵人). On 9 May 1733, Lady Liu gave birth to the sixth imperial prince Hongyan in Yuangmingyuan (圆明园), and was promoted to "Concubine Qian" (谦嫔; "qian" meaning "modest“, "amiable").

=== Qianlong era ===
In 1735, after the coronation of Qianlong Emperor, Lady Liu was promoted to "Consort Qian" (谦妃). In 1737, Empress Dowager Chongqing ordered Hongyan to bestow rich gifts to his mother, so as to show his filial piety. The prince refused to send gifts assuming that he wouldn't dare to compete with Hongli.

According to the records of 1751, Lady Liu had six palace maids: Dege (德格), Lianying (连英), Fuge (福格), Aishenzhu (爱申朱), Fengge, and Daniu.

Lady Liu died on 17 June 1767 at the age of fifty three. Her coffin was temporarily placed in Balitun Immortal Palace and later was interred at the Tai Mausoleum in Western Qing tombs.

== Titles ==
- During the reign of the Kangxi Emperor (r. 1661–1722):
  - Lady Liugiya (from 1714)
- During the reign of the Yongzheng Emperor (r. 1722–1735):
  - Second Class Female Attendant Liu (刘答应; from 1729), eighth rank consort
  - Noble Lady Liu (刘贵人; from 1730), sixth rank consort
  - Imperial Concubine Qian (谦嫔; from 1733), fifth rank consort
- During the reign of the Qianlong Emperor (r. 1735–1796):
  - Consort Qian (谦太妃; from 1735), fourth rank consort

== Issue ==
- As Noble Lady Liu:
  - Hongyan, Prince Guogong of the Second Rank (果恭郡王 弘曕; 9 May 1733 – 27 April 1765)

== See also ==
- Ranks of imperial consorts in China#Qing
- Royal and noble ranks of the Qing dynasty
