= Hongyan (prince) =

Chinese prince (1733–1765)

- Prince Guo of the Second Rank 多羅果郡王
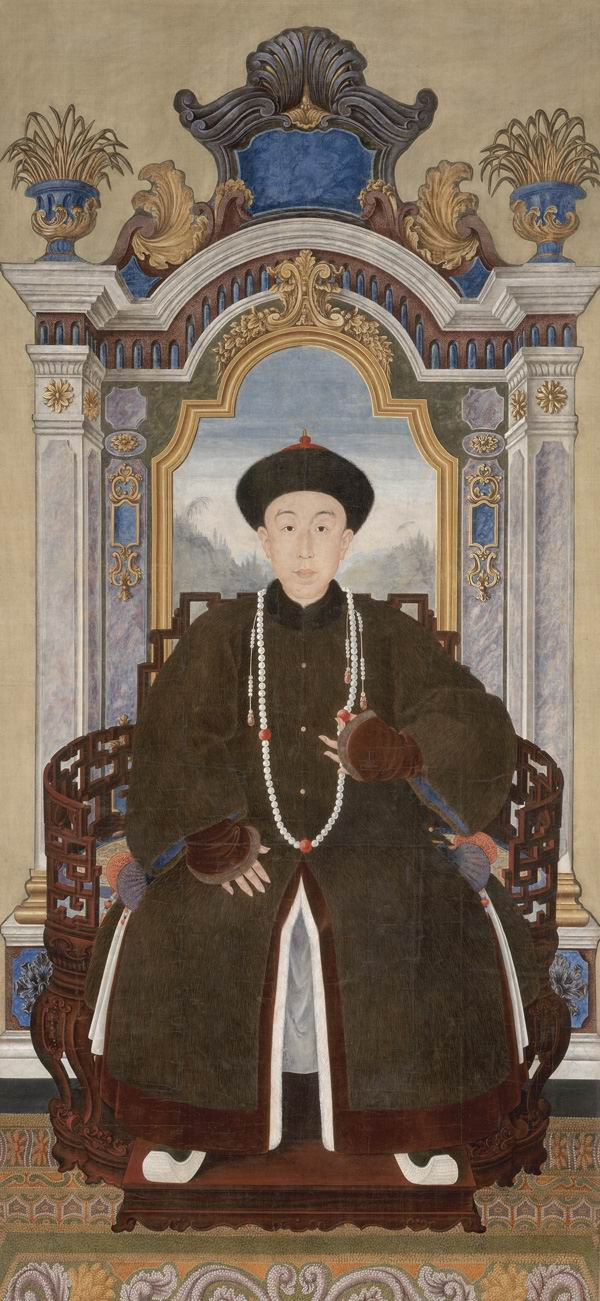
- Portrait of Hongyan

Head of the House of Prince Guo peerage
- Reign: 1738–1765
- Predecessor: Yunli
- Successor: Yongtu
- Born: Aisin Gioro Hongyan (愛新覺羅 弘曕); 9 May 1733; Old Summer Palace, Beijing
- Died: 27 April 1765 (aged 31); Beijing
- Burial: Western Qing Tombs
- Consorts: Lady Fangiya
- Issue: Yongtu, Prince Guojian of the Second Rank; Yongcan, General of the First Rank; Third son
Names
- Aisin Gioro Hongyan (愛新覺羅 弘曕)
Posthumous name
- Prince Guogong of the Second Rank (果恭郡王)
- House: Aisin Gioro
- Father: Yongzheng Emperor
- Mother: Consort Qian

Hongyan
- Simplified Chinese: 弘曕
Transcriptions
Standard Mandarin
- Hanyu Pinyin: Hóngyàn

Hongyan (弘曕; 9 May 1733 – 27 April 1765), formally known as Prince Guo, was an imperial prince of the Manchu ruled Qing Dynasty. He was the sixth son of Yongzheng Emperor.

== Life ==
Hongyan was born in the Manchu Aisin Gioro clan as the sixth son of the Yongzheng Emperor. His mother was Consort Qian (謙妃) of the Liugiya clan (劉氏), daughter of Liu Man (刘满), an official in the Qing imperial court.

When Yongzheng died, Hongyan was just 3 years old and the responsibility of educating Hongyan was taken by the Qianlong Emperor. Hongyan loved the Yuanming Yuan so much that his nickname was Yuanming Yuan Prince.

In February 1738, Hongyan was granted the title of Prince Guo of the First Rank (果恭郡王). The Qianlong Emperor was fond of him and trusted him with many important affairs. In 1759, Hongyan served as a colonel (都統) in the Bordered White Banner and in 1761, as commandant in the Han Bordered Blue Banner.

On May 13 in the 28th year of the Qianlong Emperor, Hongyan asked Gao Heng to sell ginseng due to debts to the salt merchant Jiang Qixi.When the emperor found, Hongyan was downgraded to Prince of the Third Rank and withdrew from the official posts.

In February 1765, Hongyan became sick with a serious illness and the Qianlong Emperor granted the title of Prince of the Second Rank to him.

On 27 April 1765, Hongyan died and was posthumously honoured as Prince Guo Gong of the Second Rank (果恭郡王) and be buried with the rites of a prince of the first rank. The Qianlong Emperor didn't personally attend his funeral but designed one of his sons to don the mourning grab.

== Family ==
Primary Consort

- Primary Consort, of the Fangiya clan (嫡福晉 范佳氏)
  - Yongtu, Prince Guojian of the Second Rank (果簡郡王 永瑹; 20 July 1752 – 10 September 1789), first son
  - Yongcan, Hereditary General of the First Rank (镇国将军 永璨; 9 September 1753 – 2 January 1811), second son

Secondary Consort

- Secondary Consort, of the Janggiya clan (側福晉 張佳氏)

Concubine

- Mistress, of the Liugiya clan (庶福晉 劉佳氏)
  - Yongna (7 December 1762 – 1 December 1767), third son

== See also ==
- Royal and noble ranks of the Qing dynasty
- Ranks of imperial consorts in China#Qing
- Prince Guo (果王)

== In fiction and popular culture ==
- Portrayed by Duan Shaonan in Empresses in the Palace (2011)
