= Hongshi =

Manchu prince (1704–1727)

- Born: 18 March 1704
- Died: 20 September 1727 (aged 23)
- Consorts: Lady Donggo (m. 1718)
Names
- Aisin Gioro Hongshi (愛新覺羅·弘時)
- House: Aisin Gioro
- Father: Yongzheng Emperor
- Mother: Consort Qi

Hongshi
- Traditional Chinese: 弘時
- Simplified Chinese: 弘时
Transcriptions
Standard Mandarin
- Hanyu Pinyin: Hóngshí

Hongshi (Manchu:ᡥᡠᠩ ᡧᡳ Hung ši; 18 March 1704 – 20 September 1727) was a Manchu prince of the Qing dynasty. Born to the ruling Aisin Gioro clan as the third son of the Yongzheng Emperor, he was banished from the imperial clan in 1725, ostensibly for supporting his uncle Yunsi, a political rival of his father. He died in disgrace in 1727 but was later posthumously restored to the imperial clan by his younger brother, the Qianlong Emperor.

== Early life ==
Hongshi was born to the Aisin Gioro clan as the third son of Yinzhen (Prince Yong), who was the fourth son of the Kangxi Emperor. Hongshi's mother, a Han Chinese woman with the family name "Li", was a secondary consort of Yinzhen.

Yinzhen ascended to the throne in December 1722 after the death of his father, and became known as the Yongzheng Emperor. In his father's early reign, Hongshi was not known to have played a major role in the imperial court. Unlike his fourth brother Hongli, who was awarded the title of a qinwang (first-rank prince), Hongshi never received a noble rank. Between 1722 and 1726, Hongshi became associated with his uncle Yunsi, who was a political rival of his father. In 1725, the Yongzheng Emperor stripped Yunsi of his princely title and banished him from the Aisin Gioro clan on trumped-up charges; by extension, the emperor also decreed that Hongshi would be expelled from the Forbidden City. In his imperial edict, the emperor wrote that Hongshi could "be Yunsi's son if he wishes to" – suggesting that Hongshi was especially close with Yunsi, and that the emperor was deeply troubled by their relationship.

Hongshi was barred from entering the Forbidden City, but unlike Yunsi, he was not imprisoned. He was instead placed under the custodianship of his uncle, the imperial prince Yuntao, 12th son of the Kangxi Emperor. After his banishment, Hongshi did not show any remorse. In April 1726, the Yongzheng Emperor, deeply angered at his son's refusal to repent, ordered Hongshi's name removed from the yudie (玉牒; i.e., the imperial clan genealogy book), a symbolic gesture that formally marked Hongshi's expulsion from the Aisin Gioro clan, and, by extension, the renunciation of their father-son relationship.

== Death and rehabilitation ==
Hongshi died on 20 September 1727, aged 23, in the fifth year of his father's reign. There is no authoritative account of the circumstances of his death. Some historians believe that the Yongzheng Emperor ordered Hongshi to commit suicide in order to eliminate him as a rival to his more favored brother, Hongli. Qing dynasty researcher Tang Bangzhi (唐邦治), in his 1923 book Qing Huangshi Sipu (清皇室四谱), includes a passage that seems to suggest Hongshi died on the same day he was expelled from the imperial clan, but did not elaborate further. This passage, which is not consistent with the official Draft History of Qing, led later historians to speculate about the reasons of Hongshi's death. They postulated that the Yongzheng Emperor, in recalling his own bitter struggle against his brothers over the succession to the throne, as well as his brothers' continued attempts to sabotage his rule during his reign, wanted to avoid a repeat of the same situation for his own successor. This theory, while widely circulated, was never conclusively proven. Hongshi, unlike his uncles, was never well-established politically in his own right – he neither participated in military campaigns nor undertook any significant assignments during his father's reign.

Many historians remain skeptical that Hongshi was put to death by his father. The skeptics suggest that the emperor could have placed Hongshi under house arrest – as was common practice during the reign of the Kangxi emperor – or exiled him and achieved the same ends. Moreover, Yunsi and his associates had been largely rounded up and neutralised by the time of Hongshi's death. Even if Hongshi was set free by his father, he would not have had nearly sufficient political clout to mount a challenge against Hongli. Hongshi's death made Hongli the undisputed heir apparent for the remainder of the Yongzheng Emperor's reign (their younger brother, Hongzhou, did not express interest in the struggle for succession).

Shortly after the death of the Yongzheng Emperor in 1735, the imperial prince Yunlu (允禄) wrote a memorial to the newly enthroned Hongli, the Qianlong Emperor, asking for Hongshi to be posthumously rehabilitated and restored to the Aisin Gioro clan. The Qianlong Emperor obliged and remarked that while Hongshi was "young and reckless", because "many years have passed since his demise", such harsh treatment was no longer necessary. The emperor also said that he still felt "brotherly love" towards Hongshi. Apart from some generic comments and a reference to Hongshi's association with Yunsi, neither Yunlu nor the Qianlong Emperor mentioned any specific crimes committed by Hongshi. It is therefore still somewhat of a mystery under what circumstances the Yongzheng Emperor decided to disown and banish him.

== Family ==
Primary Consort

- Primary consort, of the Donggo clan (嫡福晉 董鄂氏; 1703–1775)
  - First daughter (14 October 1722 – 2 June 1727)

Concubine

- Mistress, of the Zhong clan (鍾氏)
  - Yongshen (永珅; 11 September 1721 – 31 January 1724), first son
- Mistress, of the Tian clan (田氏)
  - Second daughter (23 March 1724 – 30 May 1726)

== In fiction and popular culture ==
- Portrayed by Qu Aohui in Scarlet Heart (2011)
- Portrayed by Wu Lipeng in Empresses in the Palace (2011)
- Portrayed by Li Jie in Ruyi's Royal Love in the Palace (2018)

== See also ==
- Royal and noble ranks of the Qing dynasty
- Ranks of imperial consorts in China § Qing
