= Consort Qi (Yongzheng) =

Qing Dunasty impial consort (1676–1737)

- Born: 1676 (康熙十五年)
- Died: 31 May 1739 (aged 62–63) (乾隆四年 四月 二十四日); Forbidden City, Beijing
- Burial: Tai Mausoleum, Western Qing tombs
- Spouse: Yongzheng Emperor (died 1735)
- Issue: Princess Huaike of the Second Rank; Hongfen; Hongyun; Hongshi
- House: Li (by birth); Aisin-Gioro (by marriage)
- Father: Wenbi

Consort Qi
- Traditional Chinese: 齊妃
- Simplified Chinese: 齐妃
Transcriptions
Standard Mandarin
- Hanyu Pinyin: Qí Fēi

Consort Qi (1676 – 31 May 1739), of the Han Chinese Li clan, was a consort of the Yongzheng Emperor. She was two years his senior.

== Life ==
=== Family background ===
Consort Qi's personal name was not recorded in history.

- Father: Wenbi (文熚), served as a prefect (知府)

=== Kangxi era ===
The future Consort Qi was born in 1676. In 1691 or 1694, Lady Li entered the residence of Prince Yong of the First Rank, Yinzhen, and became his secondary consort. On 15 August 1695, she gave birth to her first child a daughter, Princess Huaike of the Second Rank. On 19 July 1697, she gave birth to her second child, a son, Hongfen, who died prematurely on 30 March 1699. On 19 September 1700, she gave birth to her third child, a son, Hongyun, who died at the age of ten on 10 December 1710. On 18 March 1704, she gave birth to her fourth child, a son, Hongshi.

=== Yongzheng era ===
The Kangxi Emperor died, and was succeeded by his son, Yongzheng Emperor on 27 December 1722. On 28 March 1723, she was given the title of "Consort Qi".

=== Qianlong era ===
Lady Li died on 31 May 1739. She was interred in the Tai Mausoleum, in the Western Qing tombs.

== Titles ==
- During the reign of the Kangxi Emperor (r. 1661–1722):
  - Lady Li (from 1676)
  - Secondary consort (側福晉; from 1691 or 1694)
- During the reign of the Yongzheng Emperor (r. 1722–1735):
  - Consort Qi (齊妃; from 28 March 1723), fourth rank consort

== Issue ==
- As secondary consort:
  - Princess Huaike of the Second Rank (和碩懷恪公主; 15 August 1695 – April/May 1717), the Yongzheng Emperor's second daughter
    - Married Xingde (星德; d. 1739) of the Manchu Nara clan in September/October 1712
  - Hongfen (弘昐; 19 July 1697 – 30 March 1699), the Yongzheng Emperor's second son
  - Hongyun (弘昀; 19 September 1700 – 10 December 1710), the Yongzheng Emperor's third (second) son
  - Hongshi (弘時; 18 March 1704 – 20 September 1727), the Yongzheng Emperor's fourth (third) son

== In fiction and popular culture ==
- Portrayed by Zhang Yameng in Empresses in the Palace (2011)
- Portrayed by Li Man in Palace II (2012)
