= Prince Guo =

Qing dynasty princely peerage

Prince Guo of the First Rank
- Traditional Chinese: 和碩果親王
- Simplified Chinese: 和硕果亲王
Transcriptions
Standard Mandarin
- Hanyu Pinyin: héshuò guǒ qīnwáng
- Wade–Giles: ho-shuo kuo ch'in-wang

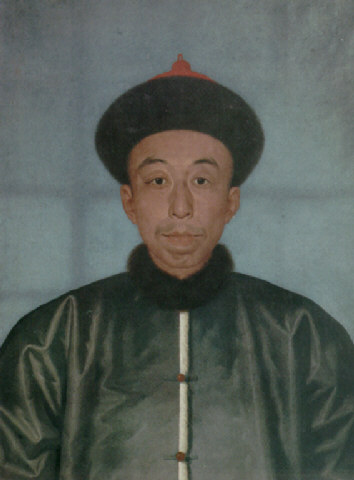
Prince Guogong

Prince Guo of the First Rank (Manchu: ᡩᠣᡵᠣᠨ
ᠠᠮᠪᠠᠯᡳ
ᠴᡳᠨ ᠸᠠᠩ; hošoi kengse cin wang), or simply Prince Guo, was the title of a princely peerage used in China during the Manchu-led Qing dynasty (1644–1912). As the Prince Guo peerage was not awarded "iron-cap" status, this meant that each successive bearer of the title would normally start off with a title downgraded by one rank vis-à-vis that held by his predecessor. However, the title would generally not be downgraded to any lower than a feng'en fuguo gong except under special circumstances.

The first bearer of the title was Yunli (1697–1738), the 17th son of the Kangxi Emperor. In 1723, he was awarded the status of a junwang (prince of the second rank) by his fourth brother, the Yongzheng Emperor, who succeeded their father. Yunli was known as "Prince Guo of the Second Rank". In 1728, he was promoted to a qinwang (prince of the first rank), hence he was known as "Prince Guo of the First Rank". The title was passed down over eight generations and was held by ten persons.

== Members of the Prince Guo peerage ==
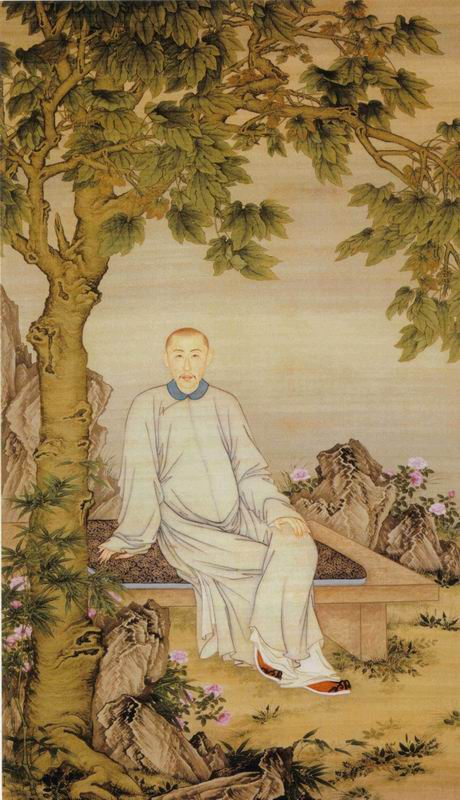
Yunli (1697–1738), the first Prince Guo

- Yunli (1st), the Kangxi Emperor's 17th son, was a second-rank prince from 1723 to 1728, promoted to qinwang in 1728, posthumously honoured as Prince Guo Yi of the First Rank (果毅親王)
  - Adoptive son: Hongyan (弘曕; 1733–1765; 2nd), the Yongzheng Emperor's sixth son, adopted as Yunli's son & heir, initially a first-rank prince from 1738 to 1763, demoted to a beile in 1763 but promoted to a second-rank prince in 1765, posthumously honoured as Prince Guo Gong of the Second Rank (果恭郡王)
    - 1st son: Yongtu (永瑹; 1752–1789; 3rd), held a second-rank prince title from 1765 to 1789, posthumously honoured as Prince Guo Jian of the Second Rank (果簡郡王)
      - 1st son: Miancong (綿從; 1772–1791; 4th), Yongtu's eldest son, held the status of a beile from 1790 to 1791
    - 2nd son: Yongcan (永璨; 1753–1810), held the title of a first class defender general from 1775 to 1800
      - 1st son: Mianlü (綿律; 1774–1832; 5th), Yongcan's eldest son and Yongtu's adoptive son, held a beile title from 1791 to 1806, stripped of his title in 1806
        - 1st son: Yixiang (奕湘; 1796–1881; 7th), Mianlü's eldest son and Miancong's adoptive son, held the title of a grace defender duke from 1833 to 1872, awarded beizi status but not a beizi title in 1872, posthumously honoured as Grace Defender Duke Keshen (奉恩鎮國恪慎公)
          - 1st son: Zaikun (載坤; 1834–1890), held the title of a bulwark general from 1857 to 1876, his title stripped in 1876
            - Puzhen (溥鉁; 1885–1920)
              - 1st son: Yuting (毓鋌; b. 1919; 10th), Puzhen's eldest son and Puyan's adoptive son, held the title of a grace bulwark duke from 1918 to 1945
          - 3rd son: Zaizhuo (載卓; 1849–1907; 8th), held the title of a grace bulwark duke from 1881 to 1907
            - 1st son: Puyan (溥閻; 1884–1918; 9th), Zaizhuo's eldest son, held the title of a grace bulwark duke from 1907 to 1918
      - 3rd son: Miantong (綿㣚; 1783–1833; 6th), held a beizi title from 1806 to 1833
        - Yiwen (奕雯), Miantong's eldest son, held the title of a second class defender general from 1833 to 1862
          - 1st son: Zaipin (載品), held the title of a third class defender general from 1862 to 1904
            - 1st son: Putang (溥棠), held the title of a supporter general from 1905 to 1945

== Family tree ==
Legend:

- - Title bearers
- - Emperors

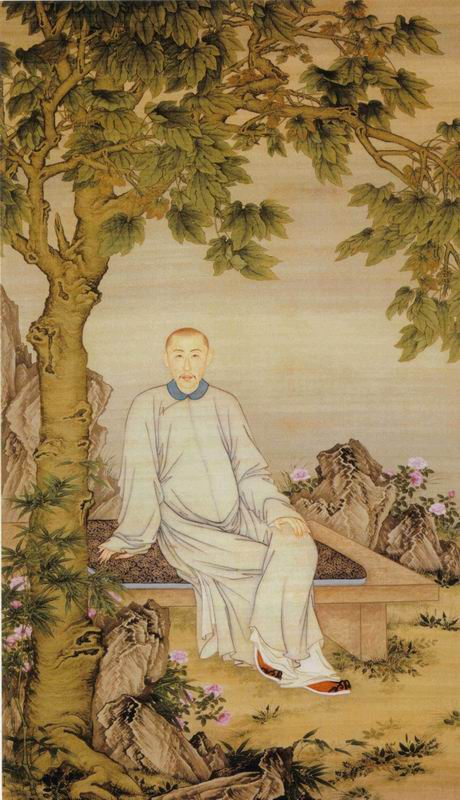
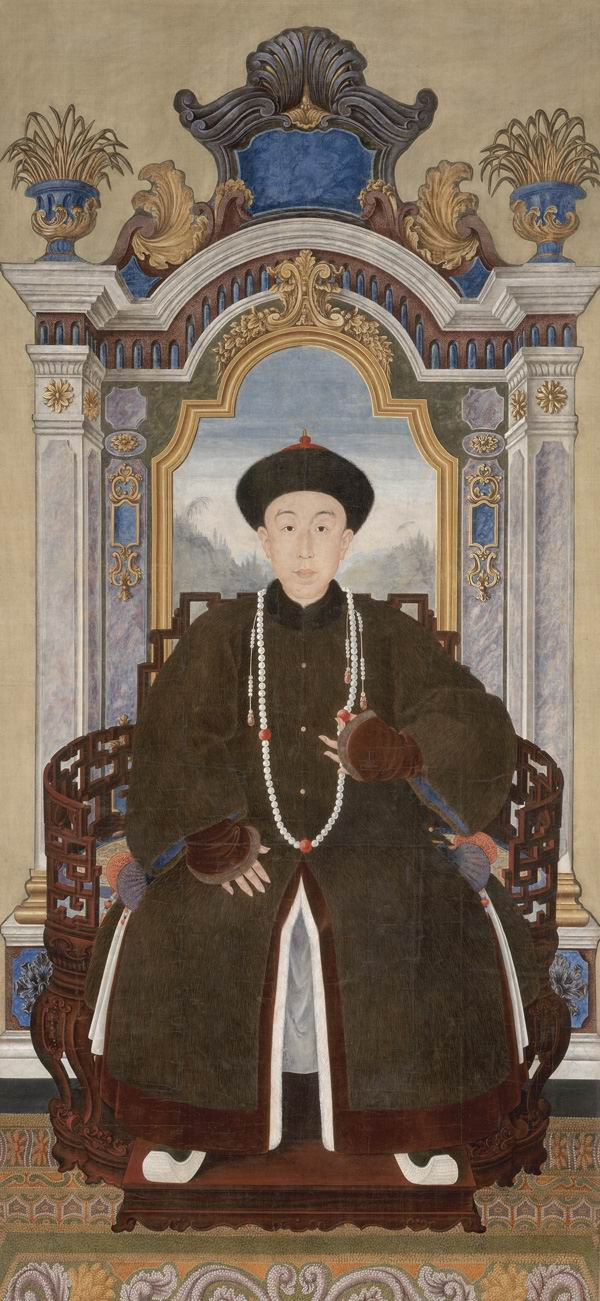
adoption
Kangxi Emperor
4 | 17
Yongzheng Emperor | Yunli ^{1} 允禮 1697 - 1738; Prince Guoyi 果毅親王; 1728 – 1738
6
Hongyan ^{2} 弘曕 1733 - 1765; Prince Guogong (of the Second Rank) 果恭郡王; 1765
1
Yongtu ^{3} 永瑹; 1752 - 1789; Prince Guojian (of the Second Rank) 果簡郡王; 1765 – 1789 | Yongcan 永璨; 1753 – 1810; First Class Defender General 一等鎮國將軍; 1775 – 1800
1 | 1 | 3
Miancong ^{4} 綿從; 1772 – 1791; Beile 貝勒; 1790 – 1791 | Mianlü ^{5} 綿律; 1774 – 1832; Beile 貝勒; 1791 – 1806 (title stripped) | Miantong ^{6} 綿㣚; 1783 – 1833; Beizi 貝子; 1806 – 1833
1 | 1
Yixiang ^{7} 奕湘; 1796 – 1881; Grace Defender Duke Keshen acting Beizi 奉恩鎮國恪慎公 衔 貝子; 1872 – 1881 | Yiwen 奕雯; Second Class Defender General 二等鎮國將軍; 1833 - 1862
1 | 3 | 1
Zaikun 載坤; 1834 – 1890; Bulwark General 輔國將軍; 1857 – 1876 (title stripped) | Zaizhuo ^{8} 載卓; 1849 – 1907; Grace Bulwark Duke 奉恩輔國公 (1881–1907) | Zaipin 載品; Third Class Defender General 三等鎮國將軍; 1862 - 1904
1 | 1
Puzhen 溥鉁; 1885 – 1920 | Puyan ^{9} 溥閻; 1884 – 1918; Grace Bulwark Duke 奉恩輔國公; 1907 – 1918 | Putang 溥棠; Supporter General 奉國將軍; 1905 - 1945
1
Yuting ^{10} 毓鋌 b. 1919; Grace Bulwark Duke 奉恩輔國公; 1919 – 1945

== See also ==
- Royal and noble ranks of the Qing dynasty
