= Prince He =

Prince He of the First Rank
- Traditional Chinese: 和碩和親王
- Simplified Chinese: 和硕和亲王
Transcriptions
Standard Mandarin
- Hanyu Pinyin: héshuò hé qīnwáng
- Wade–Giles: ho-shuo ho ch'in-wang

Prince He of the First Rank (Manchu: ᡥᠣᡧᠣᡳ
ᡥᡡᠸᠠᠯᡳᠶᠠᡴᠠ
ᠴᡳᠨ ᠸᠠᠩ; hošoi hūwaliyaka cin wang), or simply Prince He, was the title of a princely peerage used in China during the Manchu-led Qing dynasty (1644–1912). As the Prince He peerage was not awarded "iron-cap" status, this meant that each successive bearer of the title would normally start off with a title downgraded by one rank vis-à-vis that held by his predecessor. However, the title would generally not be downgraded to any lower than a feng'en fuguo gong except under special circumstances.

The first bearer of the title was Hongzhou (1712–1770), the fifth son of the Yongzheng Emperor. In 1733, he was awarded the status of a qinwang (prince of the first rank) by his father under the title "Prince He of the First Rank". The title was passed down over seven generations and was held by eight persons.

== Members of the Prince He peerage ==
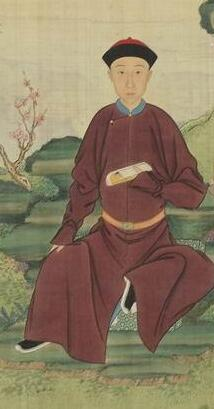
Hongzhou (1712–1770), the first Prince He

- Hongzhou (1712–1770), the Yongzheng Emperor's fifth son, held the title Prince He of the First Rank from 1733 to 1770, posthumously honoured as Prince Hegong of the First Rank (和恭親王)
  - Yongbi (永璧; 1733–1772), Hongzhou's second son, held the title of a buru bafen fuguo gong from 1757 to 1770, held the title Prince He of the First Rank from 1770 to 1772, posthumously honoured as Prince Heqin of the First Rank (和勤親王)
    - Mianlun (綿倫; 1752–1775), Yongbi's eldest son, held the title Prince He of the Second Rank from 1772 to 1774, posthumously honoured as Prince Hejin of the Second Rank (和謹郡王), had no male heir
    - Mianxun (綿循; 1758–1817), Yongbi's fourth son, held the title Prince He of the Second Rank from 1775 to 1817, posthumously honoured as Prince Heke of the Second Rank (和恪郡王)
      - Yiheng (奕亨; 1783–1832), Mianxun's third son, held the title of a beile from 1817 to 1832
        - Zairong (載容; 1824–1881), Yiheng's fourth son, held the title of a beizi from 1832 to 1881, awarded the status but not the title of a beile in 1872, posthumously honoured as Minke Beizi (敏恪貝子)
          - Pulian (溥廉; 1854–1898), Zairong's eldest son, held the title of a second class fuguo jiangjun from 1877 to 1881, held the title of a feng'en zhenguo gong from 1881 to 1898
            - Yuzhang (毓璋; 1889–1937), Pulian's second son, held the title of a feng'en zhenguo gong from 1898 to 1937
              - Hengde (恆德; b. 1908), Yuzhang's son
                - Qitai (啟泰; b. 1925), Hengde's son
          - Puyi (溥益), Zairong's second son, held the title of a second class fuguo jiangjun from 1877 to 1907
            - Yushu (毓書), Puyi's eldest son, held the title of a fengguo jiangjun from 1907 to 1945
              - Hengjun (恆鋆), Yushu's eldest son
          - Pushou (溥綬), Zairong's third son, held the title of a second class fuguo jiangjun from 1877 to 1906
      - Yicong (奕聰), Mianxun's fourth son, held the title of a third class zhenguo jiangjun from 1805 to 1836
        - Zaijia (載嘉), Yicong's eldest son, held the title of a third class fuguo jiangjun from 1836 to 1884
      - Yijin (奕謹), Mianxun's sixth son, held the title of a third class zhenguo jiangjun from 1808 to 1826, had no male heir
      - Yirui (奕蕋), Mianxun's ninth son, held the title of a fengguo jiangjun from 1821 to 1839, had no male heir
  - Yongbin (永璸; 1735–1799), Hongzhou's fourth son, held the title of a second class zhenguo jiangjun from 1754 to 1798
    - Mianming (綿命), Yongbin's second son, held the title of a fuguo jiangjun from 1798 to 1832
      - Yijun (奕俊), Mianming's eldest son, held the title of a fengguo jiangjun from 1832 to 1843, had no male heir
      - Yimeng (奕猛), Mianming's second son, held the title of a fengguo jiangjun from 1836 to 1859, stripped of his title in 1859, had no male heir
  - Yonghuan (永瑍; 1740–1783), Hongzhou's sixth son, held the title of a second class zhenguo jiangjun from 1779 to 1783
    - Mianseng (綿僧), Yonghuan's eldest son, held the title of a fuguo jiangjun from 1783 to 1807
      - Yijiao (奕交), Mianseng's eldest son, held the title of a fengguo jiangjun from 1807 to 1859
      - Yilie (奕烈), Mianseng's second son, held the title of a fengguo jiangjun from 1815 to 1851
        - Zaitou (載透), Yilie's third son, held the title of a feng'en jiangjun from 1852 to 1870, stripped of his title in 1870
  - Yongkun (永琨; 1743–1803), Hongzhou's seventh son, held the title of a buru bafen fuguo gong from 1768 to 1803
    - Mianling (綿令), Yongkun's eldest son, held the title of a third class fuguo jiangjun from 1784 to 1797
      - Yihuang (奕煌), Mianling's eldest son, held the title of a second class fengguo jiangjun from 1797 to 1798
    - Mianzhong (綿仲), Yongkun's second son, held the title of a third class zhenguo jiangjun from 1803 to 1814
      - Yishun (奕順), Mianzhong's eldest son, held the title of a fuguo jiangjun from 1814 to 1841
        - Zaichou (載疇), Yishun's eldest son, held the title of a fengguo jiangjun from 1842 to 1862, stripped of his title in 1862
    - Mianzhuo (綿倬), Yongkun's fifth son, held the title of a third class zhenguo jiangjun from 1784 to 1787, had no male heir
      - Yiheng (奕亨), Mianxun's third son, held the title of a fuguo jiangjun from 1802 to 1817, became a beile in 1817
        - Zaichong (載崇), Yiheng's fifth son, held the title of a first class fuguo jiangjun from 1826 to 1876
          - Pushan (溥善), Zaichong's eldest son, held the title of a fengguo jiangjun from 1876
            - Yuhou (毓厚; b. 1938), Pushan's son
              - Hengyin (恆蔭), Yuhou's eldest son, held the title of a feng'en jiangjun
          - Puliang (溥良; 1854–1922), Zaichong's second son, held the title of a fengguo jiangjun from 1886 to 1922
            - Yulong (毓隆; 1872–1923), Puliang's son
              - Hengtong (恆同), Yulong's son
                - Qigong (1912–2005), Hengtong's son, held the title of a feng'en jiangjun from 1922 to 1945
          - Puxing (溥興; died 1907), Zaichong's third son, held the title of a fengguo jiangjun from 1880 to 1907
            - Yusong (毓崧; b. 1909), Puxing's eldest son, held the title of a feng'en jiangjun from 1907 to 1945

== Family tree ==
Hongzhou 弘晝 (1712–1770); Prince Hegong 和恭親王 (1733–1770)
Yongbi 永璧 (1733–1772); Prince Heqin 和勤親王 (1770–1772)
Mianlun 綿倫 (1752–1774); Prince Hejin (of the Second Rank) 和謹郡王 (1772–1775)	Mianxun 綿循 (1758–1817); Prince Heke (of the Second Rank) 和恪郡王 (1775–1817)
Yiheng 奕亨 (1783–1817); Beile 貝勒 (1817–1832)
Zairong 載容 (1824–1881); Minke Beizi 敏恪貝子 (1832–1881)
Pulian 溥廉 (1854–1898); Feng'en Zhenguo Gong 奉恩鎮國公 (1881–1898)
Yuzhang 毓璋 (1889–1937); Feng'en Zhenguo Gong 奉恩鎮國公 (1898–1937)
Hengde 恆德 (born 1908)
Qitai 啟泰 (born 1925)

== See also ==
- Royal and noble ranks of the Qing dynasty
