= Concubine Mao =

Consort of Yongzheng Emperor (1677–1730)

- Born: 1677
- Died: October/November 1730 (aged 52–53); Forbidden City
- Burial: Tai Mausoleum, Western Qing tombs
- Spouse: Yongzheng Emperor (m. 1694)
- Issue: First daughter; Third daughter
- House: Song (宋; by birth); Aisin Gioro (by marriage)
- Father: Jinzhu (金柱)

Concubine Mao
- Traditional Chinese: 懋嬪
- Simplified Chinese: 懋嬪
Transcriptions
Standard Mandarin
- Hanyu Pinyin: Mào Pín

Concubine Mao (Chinese: 懋嬪; pinyin: Mào Pín; 1677 – October/November 1730), a member of the Han Chinese Song clan, was a consort of the Yongzheng Emperor.

== Life ==
=== Family background ===
Concubine Mao was a member of the Han Chinese Song clan.

- Father: Jinzhu (金柱), served as sixth rank literary official (主事, zhǔshì)

=== Kangxi era ===
The future Concubine Mao was born in 1677. In 1694, she entered a residence of Prince Yong of the First Rank, Yinzhen as a mistress. On 10 April 1694, she gave birth to first princess, who would die prematurely in May 1694. On 8 January 1707, she gave birth to third princess, who would die prematurely in February 1707.

=== Yongzheng era ===
The Kangxi Emperor died on 20 December 1722 and was succeeded by Yinzhen, who was enthroned as the Yongzheng Emperor. The same year, Lady Song was conferred the title "Concubine Mao" (懋嫔; "mao" meaning "exquisite"). She was described as a kind-hearted person and competent supervisor. She remained childless during Yongzheng era and was never promoted. Concubine Mao died in November 1730. Her coffin was temporarily placed in Tiancun Immortal Palace and later interred at Tai Mausoleum of the Western Qing tombs.

== Titles ==
- During the reign of the Kangxi Emperor (r. 1661–1722):
  - Lady Song (from 1677)
  - Mistress (from 1694)
- During the reign of the Yongzheng Emperor (r. 1722–1735):
  - Concubine Mao (懋嬪; from 20 March 1723), fifth rank consort

== Issue ==
- As mistress:
  - First daughter (10 April 1694 – April/May 1694)
  - Third daughter (8 January 1707 – January/February 1707)

== See also ==
- Ranks of imperial consorts in China § Qing
- Royal and noble ranks of the Qing dynasty
