= The Book and the Sword (disambiguation) =

The Book and the Sword may refer to:

- The Book and the Sword, known as Shu Jian En Chou Lu (or Shujian Enchou Lu) in Chinese, is a novel by Jin Yong. Other translations include Book and Sword, Gratitude and Revenge and The Romance of Book and Sword.
- Films adapted from the novel:
  - The Book and the Sword (1960 film), a 1960 two part Hong Kong film
  - Emperor and His Brother, a 1981 Hong Kong film
  - The Romance of Book and Sword, a 1987 Hong Kong film
  - Princess Fragrance (film), a 1987 Hong Kong film
- Television series adapted from the novel:
  - The Legend of the Book and the Sword (1976 TV series), a 1976 Hong Kong television series
  - Book and Sword Chronicles, a 1984 Taiwanese television series
  - The Legend of the Book and the Sword (1987 TV series), a 1987 Hong Kong television series
  - The Book and the Sword (1992 TV series), a 1992 Taiwanese television series
  - The Book and the Sword (1994 TV series), a 1994 Chinese television series
  - Book and Sword, Gratitude and Revenge, a 2002 television series
  - The Book and the Sword (2008 TV series), a 2008 Chinese television series
