= Zhang Zhaozhong (disambiguation) =

Zhang Zhaozhong is a Chinese military theorist and admiral.

Zhang Zhaozhong may also refer to:

- Zhang Zhaozhong, a character from The Book and the Sword, including in:
  - The Emperor and His Brother, 1981 film
  - Book and Sword Chronicles, 1984 TV
  - The Book and the Sword (1992 TV series)
  - The Book and the Sword (1994 TV series)
  - The Romance of Book and Sword, 1987 film
    - Princess Fragrance (film), 1987
  - Book and Sword, Gratitude and Revenge, 2002 TV
  - The Book and the Sword (2008 TV series)
