= Consort Rong =

Consort Rong may refer to:

- Consort Rong (Kangxi) (died 1727)
- Consort Rong (Qianlong) (1734–1788)

== See also ==
- Fragrant Concubine, a legendary concubine of the Qianlong Emperor, likely based on Consort Rong
