= The Legend of the Book and the Sword (1987 TV series) =

1987 Hong Kong TV series

- VCD cover
- 書劍恩仇錄
- Genre: Wuxia
- Based on: The Book and the Sword by Jin Yong
- Screenplay by: Chan Suk-hin; Yuen Siu-na; Mak Chi-sing; Lee King-wah
- Directed by: Tsang Ho-man; Wong Kin-fan; Chan Hung-kai; Lee Kwok-lap; Chan Ho-wai; Heung Lap-hang; Tang Kin-fan; Chan Toi-yuen
- Creative directors: Wong Chiu-cheung; Kan Yuen-chak; Yu Chi-san; Lee Po-wing
- Starring: Pang Man-kin; Simon Yam; Jacqueline Law; Fiona Leung; Kitty Lai; Lawrence Ng
- Theme music composer: Joseph Koo
- Opening theme: "Dream of the Hu and Han" (胡漢夢) by Canti Lau and Angela Fong
- Country of origin: Hong Kong
- Original language: Cantonese
- No. of episodes: 28

Production
- Executive producer: Lee Tim-shing
- Production location: Hong Kong
- Running time: ≈45 minutes per episode
- Production company: TVB

Original release
- Network: TVB
- Release: 19 October – 20 November 1987

The Legend of the Book and Sword (書劍恩仇錄) is a Hong Kong wuxia television series adapted from the novel The Book and the Sword by Jin Yong. The series was first aired on TVB in Hong Kong in 1987.

== Cast ==
- Pang Man-kin as Chen Jialuo / Fuk'anggan
- Simon Yam as the Qianlong Emperor
- Kitty Lai as Li Yuanzhi
- Jacqueline Law as Huoqingtong
- Fiona Leung as Princess Fragrance
- Lawrence Ng as Yu Yutong
- Shek Sau as Wen Tailai
- Chan Man-yee as Luo Bing
- Jaime Chik as Yuruyi
- Liu Kai-chi as Xu Tianhong
- Kiki Sheung as Zhou Qi
- Ng Man-tat as Zhou Zhongying
- Elliot Ngok as Zhang Zhaozhong
- Lau Kong as Lu Feiqing
- Chun Wong as Zhao Banshan
- Dicky Cheung as Xinyan
- Kwan Ching as Taoist Wuchen
- Ho Lai-nam as Chang Hezhi
- So Hon-sang as Chang Bozhi
- Henry Lee as Wei Chunhua
- Chu Tit-wo as Yang Chengxie
- Cheung Lui as Zhang Jin
- Mak Tsi-wan as Shi Shuangying
- Bobby Tsang as Jiang Sigen
- Felix Lok as Li Kexiu
- Tam Chuen-hing as Zhaohui
- Pak Ying as Yu Wanting
- Kwan Hoi-san as Yuan Shixiao
- Kon Kwok-wai as Chen Zhengde
- Pak Yan as Guan Mingmei
- Yeung Chak-lam as Wang Weiyang
- Wu May-yee as Zhou Zhongying's wife
- Wayne Lai as Meng Jianxiong
- Fok Ka-lai as An Jiangang
- Bak Man-biu as Muzhuolun
- Ngai Wai as Huo'ayi
- Benz Hui as Nasreddin
- Chan On-ying as Nasreddin's wife
- Tam Bing-man as Master Tang
- Leung Hung-wah as Tong Zhaohe
- Kiu Hung as Gu Jinbiao
- Chun Hung as Hahetai
- Ma Hing-sang as Jiao Wenqi
- Chu Siu-kei as Yan Shikui
- Ko Miu-see as Xu Chaosheng
- Lau Siu-ming as Chen Shiguan
- Chan Yau-how as Tianjing
- Yip Tin-hang as Bai Zhen
- Seung Yee as the Empress Dowager
- Ng Wan-yee as the emperor's wet nurse
