= Empress Xiaogongren =

Qing China consort (1660–1723)

- Empress Dowager Renshou
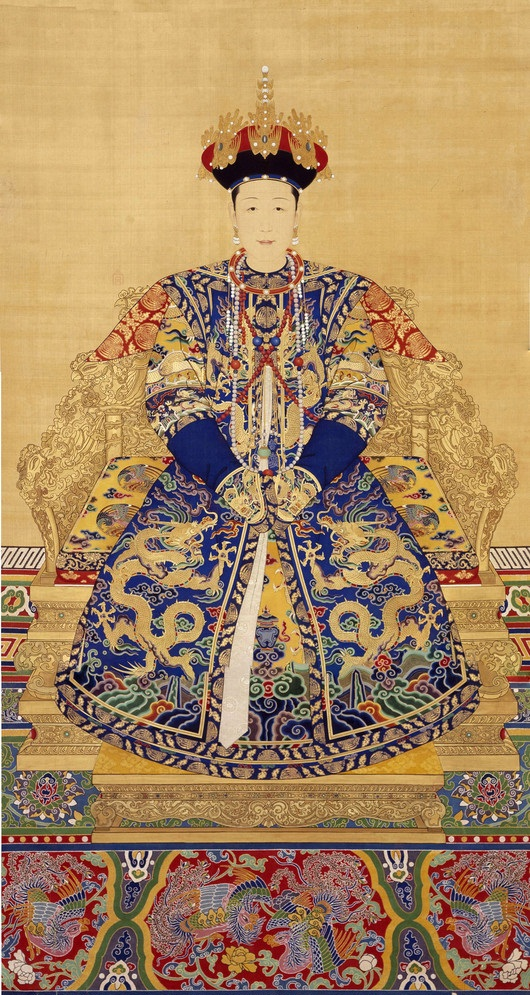
- Qing Dynasty portrait of Empress Xiaogongren

Empress dowager of the Qing dynasty
- Tenure: 27 December 1722 – 25 June 1723
- Predecessor: Empress Xiaohuizhang
- Successor: Empress Dowager Chongqing
- Born: 28 April 1660 (順治十七年 三月 十九日)
- Died: 25 June 1723 (aged 63) (雍正元年 五月 二十三日); Yonghe Palace, Forbidden City
- Burial: Jing Mausoleum, Eastern Qing tombs
- Spouse: Kangxi Emperor (died 1722)
- Issue: Yongzheng Emperor; Yinzuo; Seventh daughter Princess Wenxian of the First Rank; 12th daughter Yunti, Prince Xunqin of the Second Rank
Posthumous name
- Empress Xiaogong Xuanhui Wensu Dingyu Cichun Qinmu Zantian Chengsheng Ren (孝恭宣惠溫肅定裕慈純欽穆贊天承聖仁皇后)
- House: Uya (烏雅)
- Father: Weiwu
- Mother: Lady Saiheli

Empress Xiaogongren

Chinese name
- Traditional Chinese: 孝恭仁皇后
- Simplified Chinese: 孝恭仁皇后
Transcriptions
Standard Mandarin
- Hanyu Pinyin: Xiàogōngrén Huánghòu

Manchu name
- Manchu script: ᡥᡳᠶᠣᠣᡧᡠᠩᡤᠠ ᡤᡠᠩᠨᡝᠴᡠᡴᡝ ᡤᠣᠰᡳᠨ ᡥᡡᠸᠠᠩᡥᡝᠣ
- Romanization: hiyoošungga gungnecuke gosin hūwangheo

Empress Xiaogongren (28 April 1660 – 25 June 1723), of the Manchu Plain Yellow Banner Uya clan, was a posthumous name bestowed to the consort of Xuanye, the Kangxi Emperor and mother of Yinzhen, the Yongzheng Emperor. She was honoured as Empress Mother Renshou during the reign of her son and posthumously honoured as empress, although she never held the rank of empress consort during her lifetime.

== Life ==
=== Family background ===
Empress Xiaogongren's personal name was Malu (瑪琭). She was a Booi Aha of the Plain Yellow Banner by birth.

- Father: Weiwu (威武), served as a third rank military official (護軍參領), and held the title of a first class duke (一等公)
  - Paternal grandfather: Esen (額森)
  - Paternal grandmother: Lady Guwalgiya (瓜爾佳氏)
- Mother: Lady Saiheli (塞和裡氏)
- Elder sister: wife of Alingga (阿靈阿)
- Brother: Boqi (博啟), served as a sula amban (散秩大臣), and held the title of a first class duke.

=== Shunzhi era ===
The future Empress Xiaogongren was born on the 19th day of the third lunar month in the 17th year of the reign of the Shunzhi Emperor, which translates to 28 April 1660 in the Gregorian calendar.

=== Kangxi era ===
In February or March 1673, Lady Uya entered the Forbidden City and became a lady-in-waiting of the Kangxi Emperor. On 13 December 1678, she gave birth to the emperor's fourth son, Yinzhen. On 15 November 1679, she was granted the title "Concubine De". On 5 March 1680, she gave birth to the emperor's sixth son, Yinzuo, who would die prematurely on 15 June 1685.

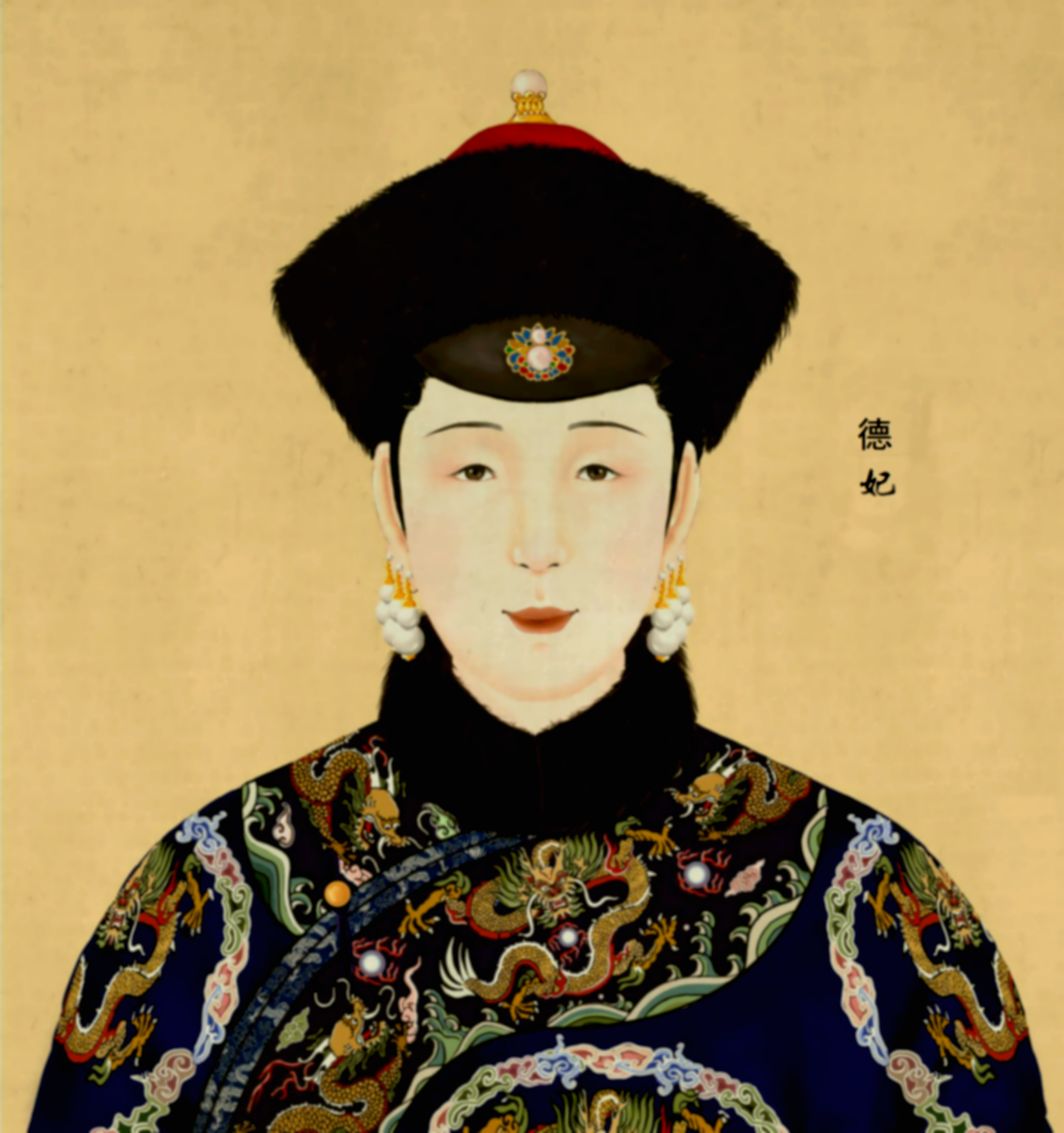
Empress Xiaogongren at the time being Consort De

On 28 January 1682, she was elevated to "Consort De". She gave birth on 5 July 1682 to the emperor's seventh daughter, who would die prematurely in September 1682, on 10 November 1683 to his ninth daughter, Princess Wenxian of the First Rank, on 14 June 1686 to his 12th daughter, who would die prematurely in February or March 1697, and on 10 February 1688 to his 14th son, Yunti.

=== Yongzheng era ===
The Kangxi Emperor died on 20 December 1722 and was succeeded by Yinzhen, who was enthroned as the Yongzheng Emperor. As the mother of the reigning emperor, Consort De was honoured as "Empress Dowager Renshou".

Empress Dowager Renshou died of illness on 25 June 1723. Some sources claimed that she wished to commit suicide to join her husband but her son refused to let her do so. She fell ill shortly afterwards and died after refusing medical treatment. She was interred in the Jing Mausoleum of the Eastern Qing tombs. She was granted the posthumous title "Empress Xiaogongren" by the Yongzheng Emperor.

== Titles ==
- During the reign of the Shunzhi Emperor (r. 1643–1661):
  - Lady Uya (from 28 April 1660)
- During the reign of the Kangxi Emperor (r. 1661–1722):
  - Concubine De (德嬪; from 15 November 1679), fifth rank consort
  - Consort De (德妃; from 28 January 1682), fourth rank consort
- During the reign of the Yongzheng Emperor (r. 1722–1735):
  - Empress Mother Renshou (仁壽聖母皇太后; from 20 December 1722)
  - Empress Xiaogongren (孝恭仁皇后; from August/September 1723)

== Issue ==
- As a mistress:
  - Yinzhen (胤禛; 13 December 1678 – 8 October 1735), the Kangxi Emperor's 11th (fourth) son, enthroned on 27 December 1722 as the Yongzheng Emperor
- As Concubine De:
  - Yinzuo (胤祚; 5 March 1680 – 15 June 1685), the Kangxi Emperor's 14th (sixth) son
- As Consort De:
  - The Kangxi Emperor's seventh daughter (5 July 1682 – September 1682)
  - Princess Wenxian of the First Rank (固倫溫憲公主; 10 November 1683 – August/September 1702), the Kangxi Emperor's ninth daughter
    - Married Shun'anyan (舜安顏; d. 1724) of the Manchu Tunggiya clan in October/November 1700
  - The Kangxi Emperor's 12th daughter (14 June 1686 – February/March 1697)
  - Yunti (允禵; 10 February 1688 – 16 February 1755), the Kangxi Emperor's 23rd (14th) son, granted the title Prince Xun of the Second Rank in 1748, posthumously honoured as Prince Xunqin of the Second Rank

== In fiction and popular culture ==
- Portrayed by Au Yin-lin in The Rise and Fall of Qing Dynasty (1987)
- Portrayed by Sally Chen in Legend of YungChing (1997)
- Portrayed by Shi Jianlan in Yongzheng Dynasty (1999)
- Portrayed by Wu Qianqian in Huang Taizi Mishi (2004)
- Portrayed by Leanne Liu in Palace (2011), Empresses in the Palace (2011) and Palace II (2012)
- Portrayed by Dai Chunrong in Scarlet Heart (2011)
- Portrayed by Vivian Wu in The Palace (2013)
- Portrayed by Rosanne Lui in Gilded Chopsticks (2014)
- Portrayed by Luo Mi in Legend of Dragon Pearl (2017)

== See also ==
- Ranks of imperial consorts in China § Qing
- Royal and noble ranks of the Qing dynasty

== Notes ==
Empress Xiaogongren House of Uya
Chinese royalty
Preceded by Alatan Qiqige, Empress Dowager Renxian (Xiaohuizhang) of the Borjigit clan	Empress dowager of China; 20 December 1722 – 25 June 1723	Succeeded by Empress Dowager Chongqing (Xiaoshengxian) of the Niohuru clan
