= Chang Fu-chien =

Chinese actor

- 張復建
- Born: Chang Chien-ling (張建陵); November 13, 1949 (age 75); Qingdao, Shandong, China
- Occupation: Actor
- Years active: 1977–present
- Children: 3

Chinese name
- Traditional Chinese: 張復建
- Simplified Chinese: 张复建
Transcriptions
Standard Mandarin
- Hanyu Pinyin: Zhāng Fùjiàn
Southern Min
- Hokkien POJ: Tiuⁿ Ho̍k-kiàn
- Musical career
- Also known as: Chang Fu-jian
- Origin: Taiwan

Chang Fu-chien (Pe̍h-ōe-jī: Tiuⁿ Ho̍k-kiàn, born Chang Chien-ling on 13 November 1949) is a Chinese actor based in Taiwan. He won Golden Bell Award for Best Actor in 1988 and 1993.

== Filmography ==
=== Films ===
Year	English title	Chinese title	Role	Notes
1977	Lantern Festival Adventure	鄉野奇談		
1978	Right Overcomes Might	鳳指神腿天佛掌		
1978	Seven Men of Kung-Fu	七俠八義		
1978	Flying Swallow	飛燕蝴蝶斬		
1978	Love Is Above Wealth and Nobility	鯉魚躍龍門		
1979	Revenge of the Shaolin Master	冷刀染紅英雄血	Xiao Yunting	
1979	Demon Strike	茅山道士		
1979	The Great Justice	天狼星		
1979	The Eagle King	大鷹王		
1979	The Art of War by Sun Tzu	孫臏下山鬥龐涓		
1979	A Sword Shot at the Sun	一劍刺向太陽		
1980	The Legend of Eight Knights	孔雀八俠傳		
1980	The Thundering Mantis	癲螳螂		
1980	Prodigal's Tears	浪子的眼淚		
1980	Lonely Famous Sword	孤獨名劍		
1981	Shaolin Legend	無花和尚		
1982	Sheng Tiao Hero	神鵰英雄		
1982	Bloody Mission	血旗變		
1982	Eagle Flying in September	九月鷹飛		
1983	Swordsman Adventure	玉劍留香		
1983	Sword with the Windbell	風鈴中的刀聲		
1983	Traveller	出外人		
1984	The Demons	九子天魔		
1984	The Bull's Son	蠻牛的兒子		
1987	The Child of Peach	新桃太郎		
1987	Spare Him from the Firing Squad	槍下留人		
1988	Lee See Fung	盜師李師科		
1989	Butterfly Murder	蝶殺		
1989	I Revenge for My Son	誓不兩立		
1989	Spring Swallow	晚春情事		
1989	Emergency Police Lady	霹靂警花		
1989	Black Shoes and White Shoes	黑皮鞋與白布鞋		
1990	Young Kickboxer	打通關		
1990	Fatal Recall	大哥大續集		
1990	Road to Hell	陰陽路		
1990	The Cold Sun	冰冷的太陽		
1993	Magic Sword	將邪神劍	Ou Yezi	
1993	In That Distant Place	在那遙遠的地方	Jiang Xue's father	
1999	Top Gear	小卒戰將		
2003	My Grandpa's Home	爺爺的家		
2009	Step by Step	瞎‧戀‧舞	Brother Din	
2012	A Moment of Love	回到爱开始的地方	Hsu Hsien-ta	

=== TV dramas ===
Year	English title	Chinese title	Role	Notes
1982	Li the Flying Dagger	小李飛刀	Shangguan Jinhong	
1986	Imperial Consort Yang	楊貴妃	An Lushan	
1987	Xishi	西施	King Fuchai of Wu	
1988	Eight Thousand Li of Cloud and Moon	八千里路雲和月	Wuzhu	
1989	A Heroic Clan: Mu Kuei-ying	一門英烈穆桂英	Yang Ye	
1992	Legends of Liu Bowen	劉伯溫傳奇	Liu Bowen	
1993	Justice Pao	包青天	Di Qing	unrelated characters
1994	The Seven Heroes and Five Gallants	七俠五義	Bao Zheng	
1996	Guan Gong	關公	Liu Bei	
1997	The Strange Cases of Lord Shi	施公奇案	Shunzhi Emperor	
2000	State of Divinity	笑傲江湖	Liu Zhengfeng	
2003	The Pawnshop No. 8	第8號當舖		
2005	Reaching for the Stars	真命天女		
2006	The Hospital	白色巨塔	Huang Kai-yuan	
2008	The Great Dragon Vein	大龍脈	Tong King-sing	
2009	Black & White	痞子英雄		
2012	Father's Wish	阿爸的願望		
2013	Amour et Patisserie	沒有名字的甜點店		
2013	Love Around	真愛黑白配	Liang Yi-lei	
2014	Pleasantly Surprised	喜歡·一個人	Fu Chih-yuan	
2014	A Different Kind of Pretty Man	不一样的美男子	Yue Qiuye	
2015	School Beauty's Personal Bodyguard	校花的貼身高手	Feng Tianlong	
2016	Swimming Battle	飛魚高校生		
