= Sally Chen =

Taiwanese actress

- 陳莎莉
- Born: 1948 (age 77–78); Qingdao, China
- Occupation: Actress

Sally Chen (Chinese: 陳莎莉; born 1948) is a Taiwanese actress. She has been nicknamed the "Empress specialist", having portrayed over a dozen Chinese empresses in television series.

She won Best Supporting Actress at the 1971 Golden Horse Awards. Between 1977 and 1981, she won Most Favorite Actress at the Golden Bell Awards for five consecutive years.

== Filmography ==
=== Television ===
Year	English title	Original title	Role	Notes
1981	The Legend of Two Seals	雙印傳奇	Empress Dowager Cixi	
1985	The Princess of the Dynasty	一代公主	Empress Wei	
1992	The Book and the Sword	書劍恩仇錄	Empress Xiaoshengxian	
1994	The Chevaliers	俠義見青天	Empress Dowager Liu	
1997	Legend of YungChing	江湖奇俠傳	Empress Xiaogongren	
1998	Happy Flying Dragon	歡喜游龍	Empress Dowager Cixi	
2000	The Prince of Han Dynasty	大漢天子	Empress Dowager Dou	
2000	Princess Huai-yu	懷玉公主	Empress Xiaohuizhang	
2001	Jade Finger Ring	玉指環	Empress Xiaogongren	
2001	Scholars, Beauties and the Qianlong Emperor	才子佳人乾隆皇	Empress Xiaoshengxian	
2005	Witness to a Prosecution III	月上江南之狄仁傑洗冤錄	Empress Wu Zetian	
2008	The Book and the Sword	書劍恩仇錄	Empress Xiaoshengxian	
2008	War and Destiny	庚子風雲	Empress Dowager Cixi	
2011	Qin Xianglian	秦香蓮	Empress Dowager Liu	
2012	The Emperor's Harem	後宮	Empress Qian	
2013	Chinese Sherlock Shi	新施公案	Empress Xiaoshengxian	
2014	The Virtuous Queen of Han	衛子夫	Empress Dowager Dou	

=== Film ===
Year	English title	Original title	Role	Notes
2017	The Bold, the Corrupt, and the Beautiful	血觀音	Director	

== See also ==
- Dai Chunrong (born 1961), another actress specializing in Chinese empresses
