= Guan Gong (TV series) =

- Poster

Chinese name
- Traditional Chinese: 關公
- Simplified Chinese: 关公
Transcriptions
Standard Mandarin
- Hanyu Pinyin: Guān Gōng
- Genre: Historical fiction
- Screenplay by: Tung Sheng
- Directed by: Liu Ming-hsin; Sun Shu-pei; Wang Chung-kuang; Pao Chin
- Starring: Kou Fung; Tsui Hao-jan; Chang Fu-chien; Chao Shu-hai; Hsieh Tsu-wu; Chin Fung; Yueh Ling
- Country of origin: Taiwan
- Original language: Mandarin
- No. of episodes: 54

Production
- Producer: Hsieh Nai-piao
- Production location: Taiwan
- Running time: 45 minutes per episode

Original release
- Network: CTS
- Release: 31 July – 14 October 1996

Guan Gong is a Taiwanese television series based on the life of Guan Yu and parts of the 14th century historical novel Romance of the Three Kingdoms by Luo Guanzhong, while incorporating some elements of fantasy and Chinese mythology as well. The series was first broadcast in Taiwan on CTS from 31 July to 15 October in 1996.

== Cast ==
- Kou Fung as Guan Yu / Dragon King of the South Sea
  - Chen Chun-sheng as young Guan Yu
- Tsui Hao-jan as Zhang Fei
- Chang Fu-chien as Liu Bei
- Lung Lung as Cao Cao
- Sung Ta-min as Lü Bu
- Lung Kuan-wu as Ding Yuan
- Irene Chiu Yu-Ting as Diaochan
- Chang Feng as Sima Hui
- Chao Shu-hai as Zhuge Liang
- Hsieh Tsu-wu as Zhao Yun
- Mini Kung as Huang Yueying
- Sze Yu as Lu Su
- Yang Chun as Dong Zhuo
- Wei Tzu-yun as Sun Ce
- Lee Hsing-wen as Sun Quan
- Chin Fung as Zhou Yu
- Esther Kwan as Sun Shangxiang
- Tsui Pei-yi as Daqiao
- Yueh Ling as Xiaoqiao
- Yang Chung-en as Lu Xun
- Ou-yang Lung as Hua Tuo
- Wang Miyuki as Sang Xiaodie
- Ku Kuan-chung as Yuan Shao
- Alyssa Chia as Wen Xiu
- Wang Hao as Lü Yu
- Vicky Chen as Xiaoying
- Huang Chung-yu as Hua Xiong / Zhang Liao
- Lu Feng as Zhou Cang
- Hsia Ching-ting as Yu Ji
- Kuang Ming-chieh as Xiahou Ying
- Li Luo as Kong Xiu
- Huang Ying-hsun as Guan Ping
- Mayko Chen as Guan Yan
- Chiang Hsia as Guan Yu's mother
- Li Hsuan as Lady Gan
- Mei Chang-fen as Lady Mi
- Yu Ke-hsin as Lady Bian
- Shao Pei-yu as Holy Mother

== See also ==
- List of media adaptations of Romance of the Three Kingdoms
