= The Chevaliers =

- Thai video cover art
- Also known as: Chevaliers; Heroes Under the Sky
- Traditional Chinese: 俠義見青天
- Simplified Chinese: 侠义见青天
- Literal meaning: Heroes and Gallants See the Blue Sky
- Hanyu Pinyin: Xiá Yì Jiàn Qīng Tiān
- Country of origin: Taiwan
- Original language: Mandarin
- No. of episodes: 38

Production
- Producer: Young Pei-pei
- Running time: 45 minutes

Original release
- Network: Taiwan Television
- Release: June 6 – July 29, 1994

The Chevaliers is a 1994 Taiwanese television drama series produced by Young Pei-pei, first aired on Taiwan Television. Produced in conjunction with Hong Kong's TVB, it's believed to be the Taiwanese drama starring the most number of Hong Kong stars, like Damian Lau, Alex Man, Cecilia Yip, Maggie Shiu, Margie Tseng, Lau Dan, Eddie Kwan, and Lawrence Ng.

Like its main rival The Seven Heroes and Five Gallants produced by Chinese Television System, it was also (very loosely) based on the 19th-century novel The Seven Heroes and Five Gallants. As a result in June and July 1994, Taiwanese prime-time audiences could switch TV channels and still watch the same non-fictional characters like Zhan Zhao, Bai Yutang and Prince of Xiangyang portrayed by different actors.

== Cast ==
- Tang Chih-wei as Emperor Renzong of Song
- Sally Chen as Empress Dowager Liu
- Damian Lau as Zhan Zhao
- Alex Man as Ouyang Chun
- Chiang Kuei-pei as Lu Fang
- Cheng Ping-chun as Han Zhang
- Kan Ti-men as Xu Qing
- Lee Ya-ming as Jiang Ping
- Chang Chen-huan as Bai Yutang
- Chang Shih as Zhi Hua
- Hsieh Tsu-wu as Ai Hu
- Chiang Ming as Eighth Prince
- Lau Dan as Prince of Xiangyang
- Lawrence Ng as Zhao Shouqian, son of Prince of Xiangyang
- Cecilia Yip
- Maggie Shiu

== Soundtrack ==
| # | Title | Singer | Lyricist | Composer | Notes |
|---|---|---|---|---|---|
| 1 | "Wen Yi Wen Qing Tian" (問一問青天) (translation: Asking the Blue Sky) | Chao Chuan | Lin Xi | Lu Hung-yu | Opening song (Ep. 1–25) |
| 1 | "Ho Cyu Zaau Cing Tin" (何處找青天) (translation: Where to Find the Blue Sky) | Chao Chuan | Lin Xi | Lu Hung-yu | Cantonese cover of Track 1 (Hong Kong only) |
| 2 | "Yingxiong Lei" (英雄淚) (translation: Hero Tears) | Lee Chien-fu | Liu Ssu-ming | Wakin Chau | Opening song (Ep. 26–38) |
| 3 | "Ru Yuan Yi Chang" (如願以償) (translation: Wish Fulfilled) | Sarah Chen | Jonathan Lee | | Ending song (Ep. 1–25) |
| 4 | "Zhi Xian Yuanyang Bu Xian Xian" (只羨鴛鴦不羨仙) (translation: Envying Mandarin Ducks Only and not Immortals) | Anita Mui | Xiaochong | | Ending song (Ep. 26–38) |
| 5 | "Yu Lin Ling" (雨霖鈴) (translation: Rain-Soaked Bell) | Winnie Hsin | Liu Yong | Cheng Tsang-liang | insert song |
| 6 | "Wang Chuan" (忘川) (translation: Stream of Oblivion) | Winnie Hsin | Chin Tieh-chang | | insert song |
| 7 | "Ri Yue Xing Chen" (日月星辰) (translation: Sun, Moon, and Stars) | Tarcy Su | Lee Man-ting | Huang Chien-chang | insert song |

The lyricist for Track 5, Liu Yong is a famous 11th-century poet. The TV series is also set in 11th-century Song dynasty.
