= The Book and the Sword (1992 TV series) =

1992 Taiwanese TV series

- Poster
- 書劍恩仇錄
- Genre: Wuxia
- Based on: The Book and the Sword by Jin Yong
- Screenplay by: Zhang Xinyi; Lin Zengying
- Directed by: Kuk Kwok-leung; Huang Zuquan; Wu Kaihui
- Starring: Kenny Ho; Leanne Liu; Fu Chuan; Shen Meng-sheng
- Theme music composer: Chen Dali; Chen Xiunan
- Opening theme: "No Regrets" (無悔無憾) by Dave Wang
- Ending theme: "Be Together in the Next Life" (來世相守) by Michelle Pan
- Composer: Xi Yulong
- Country of origin: Taiwan
- Original language: Mandarin
- No. of episodes: 48

Production
- Producers: Lin Bochuan; Liu Canrong
- Production location: Taiwan
- Cinematography: Ye Mingchong; Shao Qinghui
- Editor: Yang Ting-ting
- Camera setup: Wang Baoqi; Ma Zhongqiang; Wu Zaisheng
- Running time: ≈45 minutes per episode
- Production company: CTS

Original release
- Network: CTS
- Release: 21 October – 25 December 1992

The Book and the Sword (書劍恩仇錄) is a Taiwanese wuxia television series adapted from the novel of the same title by Jin Yong. The series was first broadcast on CTS in Taiwan in 1992.

== Cast ==
- Kenny Ho as Chen Jialuo
- Leanne Liu as Huoqingtong
- Fu Chuan as Princess Fragrance
- Shen Meng-sheng as the Qianlong Emperor
- Shao Hsin as Yu Yutong
- Nonnin as Li Yuanzhi
- Yeh Fei as Wen Tailai
- Niki Chin as Luo Bing
- Yang Lih as Xu Tianhong
- Han Ni as Zhou Qi
- Lung Lung as Zhang Zhaozhong
- Cheng Shao-feng as Lu Feiqing
- Chiang Yang as Zhou Zhongying
- Kuan Hong as Zhao Banshan
- Chu Chia-cheng as Taoist Wuchen
- Li Yu-lin as Zhang Jin
- Wu Shih-yang as Jiang Sigen
- Hsu Yu-yao as Shi Shuangying
- Hsieh Chun-liang as Xinyan
- Fan Hung-hsuan as Yu Wanting
- Sally Chen as the Empress Dowager
- Ku Pao-ming as Li Kexiu
- Dapai as Zeng Tunan
- He Chun-cheng as Muzhuolun
- Liu Shih-fan as Huo'ayi
- Huang Chung-yu as Yan Shikui
- Hsieh Chian-wen as Chang Bozhi
- Tsai Wen-hsing as Chang Hezhi
- Wu Hui-wu as Bai Zhen
- Ting Hong-wen as Chi Yin
- Sung Tao-yi as Meng Jianxiong
- Liu Yueh-ti as Rui Dalin
- Wang Li as Granny Li
- Hong Jui-hsia as Aunt Liao
