= Princess Fragrant =

Chinese television series

Princess Fragrant (Chinese: 天香公主; pinyin: Tiānxiāng Gōngzhǔ) is a Chinese 3-D cartoon series directed by Deng Jianglei and produced by the Shenzhen Qianheng Cultural Communication Company (深圳乾亨文化传播有限公司; Shēnzhèn Qiánhēng Wénhuà Chuánbō Yǒuxiàngōngsī). Its basis is the Fragrant Concubine, a Chinese legend about a Uighur girl from Kashgar who became a concubine of the Qianlong Emperor. The cartoon was produced to improve relations between the Han Chinese and the Uighurs. The series, which was available in the Mandarin and Uighur languages, has 104 episodes. It began airing in 2015.

The main characters are Ipal Khan (伊帕尔罕; Yīpàěrhǎn) and Tuerdo.

The producing company had spent $3 million U.S. dollars to create the series.
