= The Legend of the Book and the Sword (1976 TV series) =

1976 Hong Kong TV series

- Poster
- 書劍恩仇錄
- Genre: Wuxia
- Based on: The Book and the Sword by Jin Yong
- Starring: Adam Cheng; Liza Wang; Candice Yu; Louise Lee; Ha Yu; Paul Chu; Kwan Hoi-san; Gigi Wong
- Theme music composer: Joseph Koo
- Opening theme: "The Book and the Sword" (書劍恩仇錄) by Adam Cheng
- Country of origin: Hong Kong
- Original language: Cantonese
- No. of episodes: 60

Production
- Executive producer: Wong Tin-lam
- Production location: Hong Kong
- Running time: ≈45 minutes per episode
- Production company: TVB

Original release
- Network: TVB
- Release: June 28 – September 17, 1976

The Legend of the Book and the Sword (書劍恩仇錄) is a Hong Kong wuxia television series adapted from the novel The Book and the Sword by Jin Yong. It was first broadcast on TVB in Hong Kong in 1976.

== Cast ==
- Adam Cheng as Chen Jialuo / the Qianlong Emperor
- Liza Wang as Huoqingtong
- Candice Yu as Princess Fragrance
- Louise Lee as Luo Bing
- Paul Chu as Wen Tailai
- Ha Yu as Yu Yutong
- Kwan Hoi-san as Lu Feiqing
- Shih Kien as Zhang Zhaozhong
- Deborah Lee as Yuruyi
- Gigi Wong as Li Yuanzhi
- Ko Miu-see as Zhou Qi
- Lawrence Ng as Xu Tianhong
- Cheung Wood-yau as Yu Wanting
- Wong Sun as Zhao Banshan
- Kwan Chung as Wei Chunhua
- Kong Ngai as Muzhuolun
- Lo Kwok-wai as Li Kexiu
- Lo Hoi-pang as Zhang Jin
- Ng Man-tat as Jiang Sigen
- Wong Yuen-sun as Shi Shuangying
- Tam Chuen-hing as Yang Chengxie
- Lau Kwok-shing as Hahetai
- Kam Lui as Fang Youde
- Yuen Siu-tien as Chen Zhengde

== Soundtrack ==
- "The Book and the Sword" (書劍恩仇錄) by Adam Cheng
- "Missing You" (思念) by Adam Cheng and Liza Wang
- "Never Satisfied" (事事未滿足) by Susanna Kwan
- "Allah, My Lord" (安拉我主) by Liza Wang
- "Beautiful Universe" (錦繡乾坤) by Adam Cheng
- "What's There to Ask for in Life" (人生有何求) by Liza Wang
- "Mourning Princess Fragrance" (悼香魂) by various cast members
- "Prodigal's Lament" (游子恨) by Adam Cheng
- "Selecting a Groom" (選郎) by Liza Wang
- "Seeing Each Other Off" (相送) by Adam Cheng and Liza Wang
- "Azure Waters, Green Waves" (綠水青波) by Liza Wang
- "Romantic Feelings on a Pleasant Night" (良宵花月情) by Susanna Kwan
