= Legend of YungChing =

- Genre: Historical drama, Material arts
- Created by: Chou Lingkang
- Written by: Ting Shan-hsi
- Directed by: Jv Jueliang; Chan Hung-lit
- Starring: Adam Cheng; Jade Leung; Howie Huang; Tiffany Liu; Chan Hung-lit; Mark Cheng
- Country of origin: Taiwan
- Original language: Mandarin
- No. of series: 1
- No. of episodes: 59 or 60

Production
- Executive producer: Liu Wenbin
- Producer: Chou Lingkang
- Cinematography: Wu Jiatai; Hu Zhongwei; Bai Weihui; Shao Jinghui
- Editor: Ting Shan-hsi
- Camera setup: Multiple-camera
- Running time: 45 mins
- Production company: Fee Tang Production

Original release
- Release: September 3, 1997

Related
- Legendary ChienLung (1993); Bodyguard (1997)

Legend of Yungching

Chinese name
- Traditional Chinese: 江湖奇俠傳
- Simplified Chinese: 江湖奇侠传
Transcriptions
Standard Mandarin
- Hanyu Pinyin: Jiāng Hú Qí Xiá Zhuàn

Vietnamese name
- Vietnamese: Giang Ho Ky Hiep

Korean name
- Hangul: 강호기협전

Japanese name
- Kanji: 江湖奇侠伝

Legend of YungChing is a television series produced by Fee Tang Production and first aired in 1997. It was created by Zhou Lingkang and written by Ting Shan-hsi. The series covers the years between 1718 and 1755, during the reigns of the Kangxi Emperor, Yongzheng Emperor, and Qianlong Emperor of the Qing Dynasty. The show blends elements of historical drama and wuxia drama.

== Overview ==
The assassination of Kangxi during the magnificent "Hunting Exercise of Autumn" sparks off a bloody struggle for the throne. Kangxi orders his fourth son, Prince Yong (Yinzhen), to investigate. Yinzhen disguises himself as a trader in Jiangnan. He meets a famous scholar's daughter named Lu Sisi and, after overcoming various obstacles together, they fall in love. The show shows how Yinzhen's scheming and plotting allowed him to finally become the Yongzheng Emperor.

== Cast ==
Actor	Character
Adam Cheng	Yongzheng Emperor
Jade Leung	Lü Sisi
Howie Huang	Yu Zhuizi
Tiffany Liu	Yu Huier
Chan Hung-lit	Kangxi Emperor
Mark Cheng	Yinsi
Zhou Haodong	Yinxiang
Huang Yinxun	Yinti
Sally Chen	Empress Xiaogongren
Shen Mengsheng	Yinren
Che Xuan	Lv Liuliang
Huang Haibing	Nian gengyao
Tie Mengqiu	Long Keduo
Chen Yida	Li Cai
Zhang Jianli	Li Wei
