= Yunti, Prince Xun =

Qing dynasty Chinese prince (1688–1756)

Yunti
- Prince Xun of the Second Rank (多羅恂郡王)
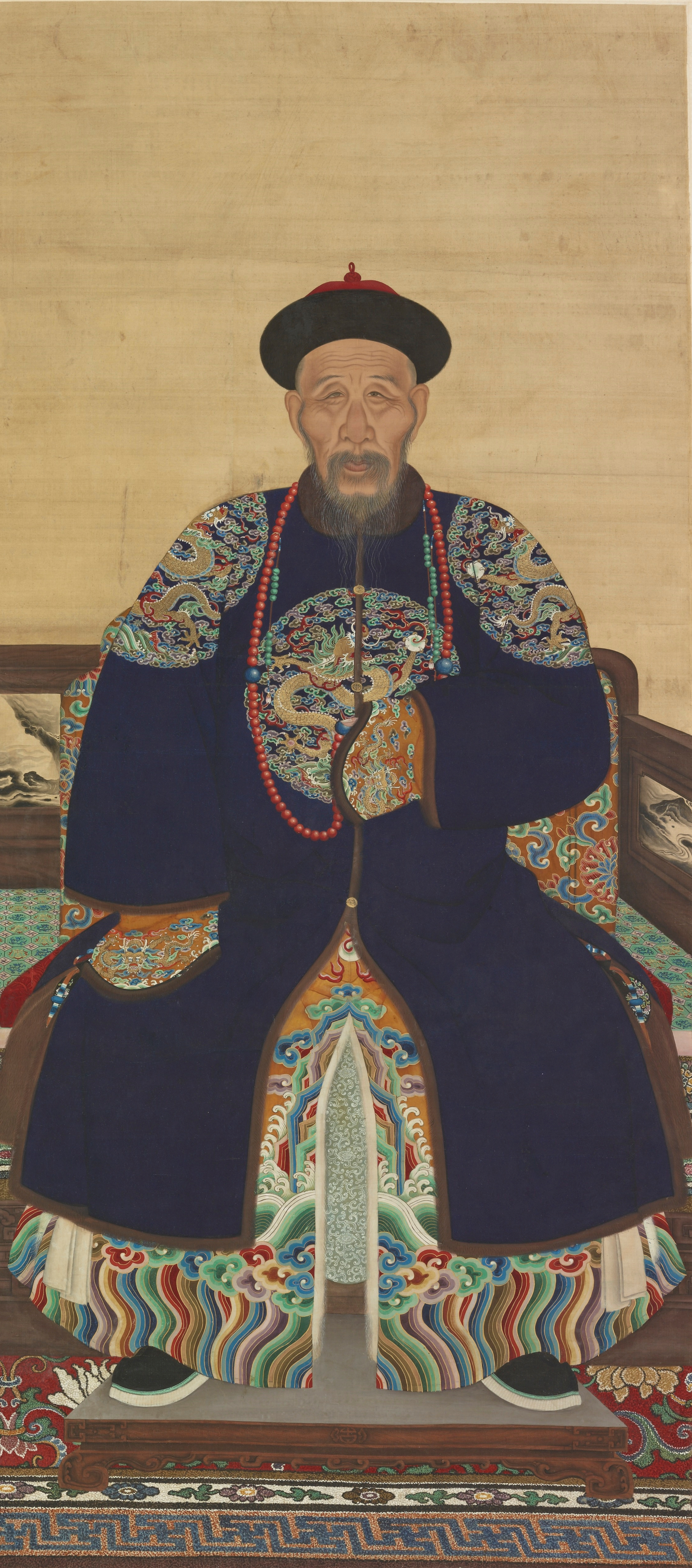
- Portrait of Yunti

Head of the House of Prince Xun peerage
- Tenure: 12 April 1748 – 16 February 1755
- Predecessor: Peerage created
- Successor: Hongming (弘明)
- Born: Aisin Gioro Yinti (愛新覺羅·胤禵); 10 February 1688; Beijing, Qing China
- Died: 16 February 1755 (aged 67); Beijing, Qing China
- Consorts: Lady Wanyan (完顏氏)
- Issue: Hongchun (弘春); Hongming (弘明); Hongying (弘映); Hongkai (弘暟); Princess of the Third Rank; Lady of the Second Rank; Lady of the Second Rank; Princess of the Third Rank; Princess of the Fourth Rank
Names
- Aisin Gioro Yinti (愛新覺羅·胤禵); Aisin Gioro Yinzhen (愛新覺羅·胤禎) (changed in 1706); Aisin Gioro Yunti (愛新覺羅·允禵) (changed in 1722)
Posthumous name
- Prince Xunqin of the Second Rank (恂勤郡王)
- House: Aisin Gioro
- Father: Kangxi Emperor
- Mother: Empress Xiaogongren

Yunti, Prince Xun
- Chinese: 允禵
Transcriptions
Standard Mandarin
- Hanyu Pinyin: Yǔntí

Yinti
- Chinese: 胤禵
Transcriptions
Standard Mandarin
- Hanyu Pinyin: Yìntí
- Wade–Giles: Yin-t'i

Yunti (10 February 1688 – 16 February 1755), born Yinti, posthumous name Prince Xunqin of the Second Rank, was an imperial prince and military general of the Qing dynasty of China.

Yunti was tasked by his father, the Kangxi Emperor, to lead the Qing army into battle against the Dzungar Khanate. Though he proved to be a successful and popular military leader, he was later imprisoned by his brother, the Yongzheng Emperor. The Yongzheng Emperor suppressed the evidence of Yinti's accomplishments and also possible evidence of his right to the throne.

== Life ==
=== Kangxi era ===
Yunti was born Yinti, but in 1706 when he reached adulthood, his name was changed to Yinzheng (胤禎). He was the 14th son of the Kangxi Emperor. His mother was Empress Xiaogongren, who also bore the Kangxi Emperor's fourth son, Yinzhen (later the Yongzheng Emperor). As Yinzheng's name was similar to that of Yinzhen's, it was later changed to Yinti (允禵).

In 1709, Yinti was granted the title of a beizi. In 1718, after Dzungar forces defeated a Qing army along the Salween River in Tibet, the Kangxi Emperor appointed Yinti as "Great General Who Pacifies the Frontier" (撫遠大將軍) to lead an army of 300,000 into Tibet to attack the Dzungars and their leader, Tsewang Rabtan. It was believed that this was a sign that the Kangxi Emperor was considering Yinti as a potential heir to his throne. In February 1720, Yinti ordered his deputies Galbi and Yanxin to set out from Xining to take Lhasa, while he remained in Xining to build up support with their Mongol allies and then escort the Seventh Dalai Lama to Lhasa. On 24 September 1720, Yinti captured Lhasa and returned the Dalai Lama to the Potala Palace.

During the Kangxi era, it was known that the Jesuits in Beijing cultivated a relationship with Yinti, whom they believed would become the next emperor.

Recent research by Puente-Ballesteros shows that even when Yinti was away leading the Tibet campaign, he was entrusted with the sensitive and important task of composing the Medical Palace Memorials, which were based on reports of imperial physicians on the Kangxi Emperor and other imperial family members' health. This task was performed by the previous crown prince Yinreng and later by the third prince Yinzhi (who was considered the oldest son in practice, because his two old brothers were stripped of their titles and imprisoned) for many years before being entrusted to Yinti in the final years of the Kangxi Emperor's life.

=== Yongzheng era ===
On 21 December 1722, just as Yinti was planning for a conquest of the Dzungar Khanate, according to official accounts, he received news of the Kangxi Emperor's death and was immediately summoned back to the capital, Beijing, to attend his father's funeral. Yinzhen succeeded their father and became historically known as the Yongzheng Emperor. It is now known, through the Yongzheng Emperor's correspondence, that Yinti was called back either by his own father (presumably to arrange for Yinti's succession to the throne), or the Yongzheng Emperor (in their father's name and with a forged edict that only mentioned the inheritance matter and not their father's death) who wanted to deceive him into renouncing his military powers. Yinti was only informed of his father's death when he reached Shanxi. He initially had the idea of returning to his headquarters, but was persuaded not to do so. He then accepted that the throne was lost and decided to return to the capital, fully expecting to be executed by his brother.

Yinti and his brothers had to change the character Yin (胤) in their names to Yun (允) to avoid naming taboo, because the reigning emperor's personal name contained the character Yin.

In 1723, Yunti was promoted from beizi to junwang (second-rank prince). However, in the following year, he was demoted back to beizi. The Yongzheng Emperor perceived Yunti as a potential threat to his throne, so he stripped Yunti of his beizi title in 1725 and placed him under house arrest at Shouhuang Palace, in the present-day Jingshan Park. He seemed to have been moved many times. In 1734, he had a daughter with a maid servant somewhere near the Yuanyou Pagoda in the Garden of the Exuberant Spring. By the time the Yongzheng Emperor died in 1735, it was reported by Korean emissaries that Yunti was confined in the back garden of the Old Summer Palace (where his brother usually lived). They also reported that shortly before the emperor died, the security around Yunti, who was guarded by one thousand armored soldiers, was only increased, even though otherwise the emperor, who seemed to fear Yunti the most, treated him well.

At one point, the Yongzheng Emperor seemed to have offered Yunti freedom in exchange for service but he refused. He angrily retorted that Maersai, the man who was sent to persuade him, should be killed before he accepted to serve the Yongzheng Emperor in any capability (Maersai played an important role in suppressing Yinti during the Yongzheng Emperor's succession or usurption of the throne and after the case of Cai Huaixi, who sent a letter to Yinti to invite him to reclaim the throne).

=== Qianlong era ===
In 1735, the Yongzheng Emperor died and was succeeded by his fourth son Hongli, who became historically known as the Qianlong Emperor. The Qianlong Emperor released Yunti in the same year after his coronation. In 1737, Yunti was restored to the ranks of nobility as a fuguo gong (a lesser duke). Ten years later, in 1747, he was promoted to beile. In 1748, he was further promoted back to junwang and granted the title "Prince Xun of the Second Rank" (恂郡王).

Yunti died on 16 February 1755 and was posthumously honoured as Prince Xunqin of the Second Rank (恂勤郡王). The Prince Xun peerage was inherited by his second son, Hongming (弘明; 1705–1767), who became a beile in 1735.

== Family ==
Primary Consort

- Princess Consort Xunqin, of the Wanyan clan (恂勤郡王福晋 完顏氏)
  Titles: Primary Consort of the Fourteenth Prince (第十四王子福晋) → Princess Consort of the Fourth Rank (贝子夫人) → Princess Consort of the Second Rank (郡王福晋) → Princess Consort of the Fourth Rank (贝子夫人) → Primary Consort of the Fourteenth Son of the Kangxi Emperor (第十四儿子福晋) → Duchess of the Second Rank (不入八分国公夫人)→ Princess Consort of the Third Rank (贝勒夫人) → Princess Consort Xun of the Second Rank (恂郡王福晋) → Princess Consort Xunqin of the Second Rank (恂勤郡王福晋)
  - Hongming, Prince Gongqin of the Third Rank (恭勤贝勒 弘明; 25 April 1705 – 4 February 1767), 2nd son
  - Hongkai (弘暟; 31 December 1707 – 28 January 1759), 4th son

Secondary Consort

- Secondary consort, of the Šušu Gioro clan (側福晉 舒舒覺羅氏)
  Titles: Secondary Consort of the Fourteenth Prince (第十四皇子侧妃) → Secondary Consort of a Beizi (貝子侧妃) → Secondary Consort of a Junwang (郡王侧福晋) → Secondary Consort of the Fourteenth Son of the Kangxi Emperor (第十四儿子侧妃) → Secondary Consort of a Duke (不入八分国公侧妃) → Secondary Consort of a Beile (贝勒侧妃) → Secondary Consort of Xun Junwang (恂郡王侧福晋) → Secondary Consort Xunqin of the Second Rank (恂勤郡王侧福晋)
  - Hongchun, Prince Tai of the Second Rank (泰郡王 弘春; 11 October 1703 – 3 March 1739), 1st son
  - Princess of the Third Rank (郡主; 5 December 1705 – 1 March 1729), 2nd daughter
    - Married Chenggunjab (成衮扎布) of the Harqin league on 10 February 1719
  - Lady of the Second Rank (縣君; 22 June 1706 – 10 June 1761), 3rd daughter
    - Married Halu of the Namdulu clan in December 1727
  - Princess of the Third Rank (郡主; 8 August 1707 – 4 October 1776), 5th daughter
- Secondary consort, of the Irgen Gioro clan (側福晉 伊爾根覺羅氏)
  Titles: Secondary Consort of the Fourteenth Prince (第十四皇子侧妃) → Secondary Consort of a Beizi (貝子侧妃) → Secondary Consort of a Junwang (郡王侧福晋) → Secondary Consort of the Fourteenth Son of the Kangxi Emperor (第十四儿子侧妃) → Secondary Consort of a Duke (不入八分国公侧妃) → Secondary Consort of a Beile (贝勒侧妃) → Secondary Consort of Xun Junwang (恂郡王侧福晋) → Secondary Consort Xunqin of the Second Rank (恂勤郡王侧福晋)
  - First daughter (20 February 1705 – March/April 1706)
  - Princess of the Second Rank (縣君; 17 November 1706 – 16 February 1773), 4th daughter
    - Married Deshou (德绶) of the Aohan Borjigin clan
  - Hongying (弘映; 12 December 1707 – 29 August 1771), 3rd son

Concubine

- Mistress, of the Wu clan (吳氏)
  Titles: Mistress of a Duke (不入八分国公格格) → Concubine of a Beile (贝勒庶妃)→ Concubine of Xun Junwang (恂郡王庶妃) → Concubine of Prince Xunqin of the Second Rank (恂勤郡王庶妃)
  - Sixth daughter (22 February 1737 – 21 September 1741)
- Mistress, of the Irgen Gioro clan (伊爾根覺羅氏)
  Titles: Concubine of Xun Junwang (恂郡王庶妃) → Concubine of Prince Xunqin of the Second Rank (恂勤郡王庶妃)
  - Princess of the Fourth Rank (縣主; 30 October 1753 – 10 April 1776), 7th daughter
    - Married Erdengge of the Niohuru clan in December 1767

== In fiction and popular culture ==
- Portrayed by Cheung Wai in The Rise and Fall of Qing Dynasty (1988)
- Portrayed by Huang Yinxun in Legend of YungChing (1997)
- Portrayed by Xu Zuming in Yongzheng Dynasty (1999)
- Portrayed by Derek Kwok in The King of Yesterday and Tomorrow (2003)
- Portrayed by Chen Zhihui in Huang Taizi Mishi (2004)
- Portrayed by Mao Zijun in Palace (2011)
- Portrayed by Lin Gengxin in Scarlet Heart (2011)
- Portrayed by Wei Qianxiang in Palace II (2012)
- Portrayed by Owen Cheung in Gilded Chopsticks (2014)
- Portrayed by Xin Yun Lai in Dreaming Back to the Qing Dynasty (2019)

== See also ==
- Prince Xun (恂)
- Royal and noble ranks of the Qing dynasty
- Ranks of imperial consorts in China § Qing
