= Vicky Chen (born 1970) =

Taiwanese actress

- 陳孝萱
- Born: 17 July 1970 (age 55)
- Spouse: Chan Jen-hsiung
- Awards: Golden Bell Award for Best Actress in a Miniseries or Television Film

Vicky Chen or Chen Hsiao-hsuan (Chinese: 陳孝萱; born 17 July 1970) is a Taiwanese actress, best known for her role of Xiao Zhao in the TTV drama Heaven Sword and Dragon Sabre (1994), an adaptation of Jin Yong’s wuxia novel of the same name. She won the Golden Bell Award for Best Actress in a Miniseries or Television Film for Shi Guan Shen Xian (2009).

Chen married actor Howie Huang in 1996 and separated the following year. While Chen claimed they never formally registered the marriage, both Huang and television host Jacky Wu later stated that the marriage was registered, though the divorce was not. Following her split from Huang, Chen entered a high-profile relationship with Wu, reportedly unaware that he was already married with four children. Their relationship ended in 2000 after Wu publicly acknowledged his family. Chen subsequently dated television producer Chan Jen-hsiung, with whom she married in 2005. The couple had one child in 2006 before separating in 2007.

== Selected filmography ==
- The Heaven Sword and Dragon Saber (1994)
- Guan Gong (1996)
- Book and Sword, Gratitude and Revenge (2002)
- The Legend of Brown Sugar Chivalries (2008)
- Down with Love (2010)
- Go, Single Lady (2014)
- On Our Way (2023)
