= The Book and the Sword (2008 TV series) =

2008 Chinese TV series

- The Book and the Sword intertitle
- Also known as: Legend of the Book and Sword
- 书剑恩仇录
- Genre: Wuxia
- Based on: The Book and the Sword by Jin Yong
- Screenplay by: Liu Kuixu; Wu Jiuru; Li Yanbo; Liu Yuzhu
- Directed by: Tan Youye; Wen Weiji; He Zhenhua
- Starring: Adam Cheng; Qiao Zhenyu; Niki Chow; Liu Ying; Liu Dekai; Lu Chen; Deep Ng
- Opening theme: "In the Human World" (在人间) by Adam Cheng and Wang Qi
- Ending theme: "It's Better to Let You Go" (还是让你走) by Niki Chow; "Give Up" (放弃) by Yang Yang
- Composer: Ren Peng
- Country of origin: China
- Original language: Mandarin
- No. of episodes: 40

Production
- Producers: Wang Pengju; Yin Lianhe; Au Chi-yan
- Production location: China
- Running time: ≈45 minutes per episode

Original release
- Network: CETV-3
- Release: 20 March 2009 – 2009

Poster

The Book and the Sword (书剑恩仇录) is a 2008 Chinese wuxia television series loosely adapted from the novel of the same title by Jin Yong, starring Qiao Zhenyu, Adam Cheng, Niki Chow, and Liu Dekai. It was first broadcast on CETV-3 in China in 2009.

== Synopsis ==
The story generally follows the novel in terms of the flow of events. However, unlike in the novel and earlier adaptations, Yu Wanting is the primary antagonist instead of the Qianlong Emperor. "Yu Wanting" is the alter ego of the exiled prince Yintang, a half-brother of the Yongzheng Emperor. The power-hungry Yintang seeks vengeance and wants to usurp the throne from the Qianlong Emperor. Yintang knows the truth that the Qianlong Emperor is not the Yongzheng Emperor's biological son, and constantly threatens the Qianlong Emperor with the evidence he holds. He secretly forms the Red Flower Society and instigates the society and some tribal people in Xinjiang to oppose the Qianlong Emperor.

Yintang fakes his death at one point and allows his godson, Chen Jialuo, to succeed him as leader of the Red Flower Society. Within the society, the Chang brothers, Wei Chunhua and Shi Shuangying are the only ones who know that "Yu Wanting" is still alive, and they serve as his spies by watching over Chen Jialuo and the others.

The series also feature a different ending from the novel, with many of the society's members meeting their ends at the hands of Yintang. The surviving ones, under Chen Jialuo's leadership, confront Yintang to put an end to his ruthless ambitions.

== Cast ==
- Qiao Zhenyu as Chen Jialuo / Fuk'anggan
- Adam Cheng as the Qianlong Emperor
- Niki Chow as Huoqingtong
- Liu Ying as Princess Fragrance
- Liu Dekai as Yu Wanting / Yintang
- Lu Chen as Li Yuanzhi
- Li Chengyuan as Zhou Qi
- Fu Hongjun as Taoist Wuchen
- Zhang Ping as Zhao Banshan
- Liu Naiyi as Wen Tailai
- Zhong Liang as Chang Bozhi
- Tan Jianchang as Chang Hezhi
- Li Yuan as Xu Tianhong
- Xu Xiaoming as Yang Chengxie
- Ng Yuen-chun as Wei Chunhua
- Lu Yuwen as Zhang Jin
- Qi Fang as Luo Bing
- Zhao Dongbo as Shi Shuangying
- Zhang Kai as Jiang Sigen
- Deep Ng as Yu Yutong
- Sally Chen as Empress Dowager Chongqing
- Bryan Leung as Yuan Shixiao
- Wong Yat-fei as Cheng Zhengde
- Yuen Qiu as Guan Mingmei
- Li Donglin as Zhang Zhaozhong
- You Jiahui as Bu Qianjia
- Li Shipeng as Tong Zhaohe
- Wang Gang as Zhou Zhongying
- Tong Xiaomei as Zhou Qi's mother
- Zheng Wei as Zhou Yingjie
- Cui Gui as Ma Zhen
- Dong Zhihua as Lu Feiqing
- Yao Jia as the Empress
- Ren Wei as Heshen
- Yang Yifan as Bai Zhen
- Chen Tao as Etu
- Hong Zongyi as Prince Zheng
- Zhang Wei as Hong Shi
- Shen Baoping as the Yongzheng Emperor
- Zhao Enhan as the Nine Gates Infantry Commander
- Wang Yingqi as Zhaohui
- Gong Fangmin as Li Kexiu
- An Ruiyun as E'ertai
- Du Yachun as Xu Xiangping
- Wu Lihua as Physician Cao
- Yang Min as Yuruyi
- Liu Hengyu as Aizhuo'er
- Zhou Jiwei as Long Jun
- Yan Jun as Tang Yilei
- Jin Peng as Hahetai
- Liu Zifei as a Yuezhi princess
- Hou Jianglong as Han Wenchong
- Xu Xiangdong as Muzhuolun
- Luo Ya as Xiaolan, Xiaolu, Wu Chanjuan
- Huang Wei as Rui Dalin
- Niu Ziqing as Meng Jianxiong
- Liu Juntao as Yan Shizhang
- Zhang Shaohui as Cheng Huang
- Jiao Changdao as Zeng Tu'an
- Yuan Ming as Wan Qinglan
- Gan Qilin as Li Guangping
- Wang Hong as Eunuch Li
- Song Haitao as Yan Bogan
- Zhang Guofeng as Ma Shanjun
- Wang Xinchen as Gu Youlan

== Reception ==
The series has been criticised in Guangzhou Daily by viewers, who feel that the story deviates the most from the novel among all the film and television adapted from Jin Yong's works.
