= Prince Xun (恂) =

Prince Xun of the Second Rank
- Traditional Chinese: 多羅恂郡王
- Simplified Chinese: 多罗恂郡王
Transcriptions
Standard Mandarin
- Hanyu Pinyin: duōluó xún jùnwáng
- Wade–Giles: to-lo hsün chün-wang

Prince Xun of the Second Rank, or simply Prince Xun, was the title of a princely peerage used in China during the Manchu-led Qing dynasty (1644–1912). As the Prince Xun peerage was not awarded "iron-cap" status, this meant that each successive bearer of the title would normally start off with a title downgraded by one rank vis-à-vis that held by his predecessor. However, the title would generally not be downgraded to any lower than a feng'en fuguo gong except under special circumstances.

The first bearer of the title was Yunti (1688–1756), the Kangxi Emperor's 14th son, who was granted the title "Prince Xun of the Second Rank" by the Qianlong Emperor in 1748. The title was passed down over seven generations and held by eight persons.

== Members of the Prince Xun peerage ==
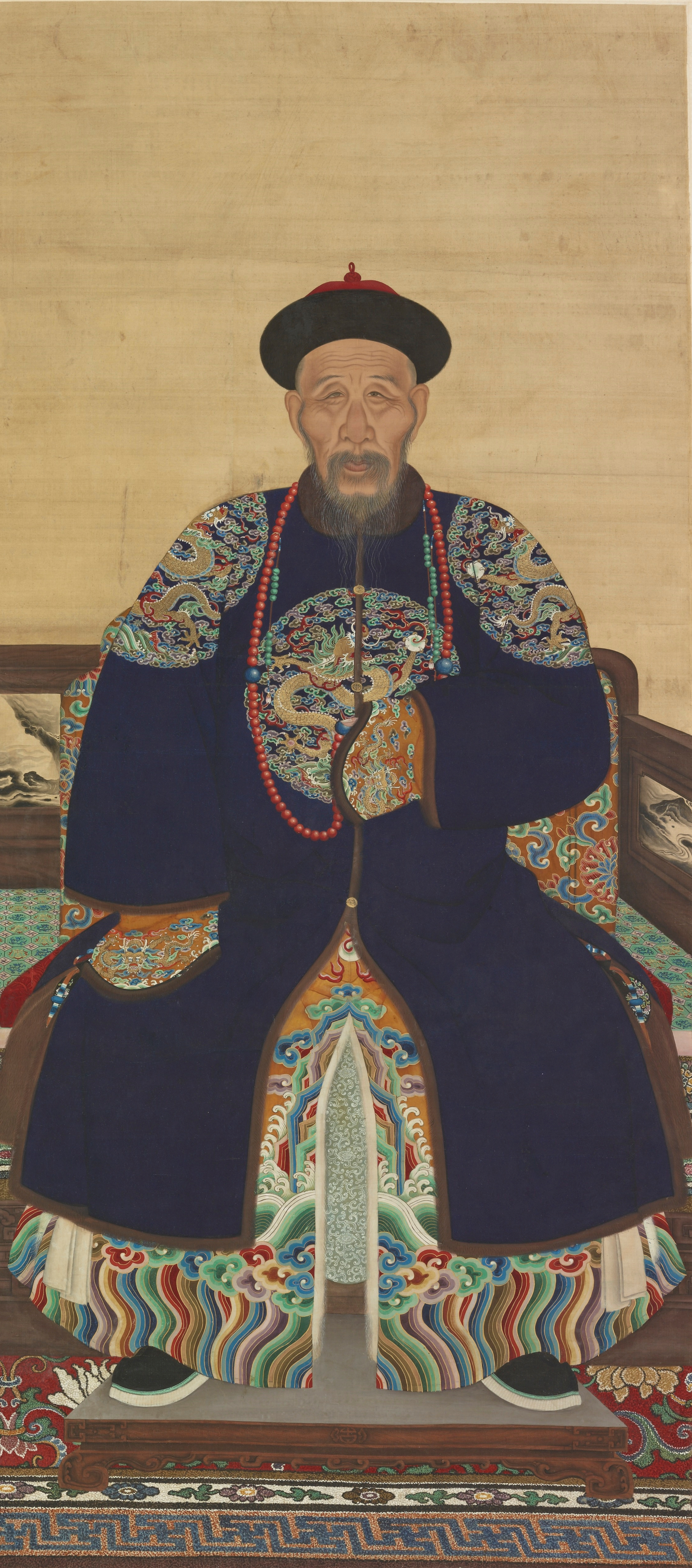
Yunti (1688–1755), the first Prince Xun

- Yunti (16 January 1688 – 16 February 1755), the Kangxi Emperor's 14th son, initially a beizi from 1709, promoted to junwang (second-rank prince) in 1723, demoted to beizi in 1724, stripped of his title in 1725, restored as a fuguo gong in 1737, promoted to beile in 1747, granted the title "Prince Xun of the Second Rank" in 1748, posthumously honoured as Prince Xunqin of the Second Rank (恂勤郡王)
  - Hongchun (弘春; 11 October 1703 – 3 March 1739), Yunti's eldest son, initially a beizi, stripped of his title in 1724, restored as a feng'en zhenguo gong in 1726, promoted to beizi in 1728, promoted to beile in 1731, promoted to junwang as "Prince Tai of the Second Rank" (泰郡王) in 1733, demoted to beizi in 1734, stripped of his title in 1735
    - Yongxin (永信; 1 October 1720 – 15 February 1806), Hongchun's eldest son
    - Yongjin (永晉), Hongchun's son
      - Mianbei (綿備), Yongjin's son
        - Yishan (13 June 1790 – 30 June 1878), Mianbei's eldest son, held the title of a first class zhenguo jiangjun from 1847 to 1878
          - Zaizhuo (載鷟), Yishan's second son, held the title of a third class fuguo jiangjun from 1851 to 1876
            - Puhan (溥翰), Zaizhuo's eldest son, held the title of a third class fengguo jiangjun from 1857 to 1878, held the title of a third class fuguo jiangjun from 1878 to 1886
              - Yuzhao (毓照), Puhan's third son, held the title of a third class fuguo jiangjun from 1887
  - Hongming (弘明; 25 April 1705 – 4 February 1767), Yunti's second son, held the title of a beile from 1735 to 1767, posthumously honoured as Gongqin Beile (恭勤貝勒)
    - Yongzhong (永忠; 1735–1793), Hongming's eldest son, held the title of a third class fuguo jiangjun from 1756 to 1793
      - Miansuan (綿算), Yongzhong's fifth son, held the title of a third class fengguo jiangjun from 1793 to 1844, had no male heir
    - Yongshuo (永碩; 1736–1808), Hongming's second son, held the title of a third class fuguo jiangjun from 1757 to 1767, promoted to beizi in 1767
      - Mianling (綿齡; 1776–1824), Yongshuo's third son, held the title of a third class fuguo jiangjun from 1795 to 1808, promoted to feng'en zhenguo gong in 1808
        - Yixing (奕興; 1812–1858), Mianling's fourth son, held the title of a feng'en zhenguo gong from 1824 to 1858
          - Zaisen (載森; 1843–1887), Yixing's second son, held the title of a buru bafen zhenguo gong from 1858 to 1887
            - Pubo (溥博; 1872–1894), Zaisen's eldest son, held the title of a buru bafen zhenguo gong from 1887 to 1894, had no male heir
            - Puduo (溥多; 1879–?), Zaisen's second son, held the title of a buru bafen zhenguo gong from 1895, had no male heir
              - Yubao (毓寶; 1903–?)
          - Zaiguo (載國), Yixing's third son, held the title of a third class fuguo jiangjun from 1868 to 1895, had no male heir
      - Mianzan (綿贊), Yongshuo's fourth son, held the title of a second class fuguo jiangjun from 1799 to 1818
        - Yicheng (奕誠), Mianzan's eldest son
          - Zaigui (載桂), Yicheng's eldest son, held the title of a second class fengguo jiangjun from 1818 to 1866
        - Yipu (奕譜), Mianzan's second son, held the title of a fengguo jiangjun from 1821 to 1834, had no male heir
        - Yiqia (奕洽), Mianzan's third son, held the title of a fengguo jiangjun from 1824 to 1868
          - Zaihe (載荷), Yiqia's eldest son, held the title of a feng'en jiangjun from 1857 to 1885, had no male heir
          - Zaishen (載申), Yiqia's second son, held the title of a feng'en jiangjun from 1864
            - Puxi (溥錫), Zaishen's eldest son, held the title of a feng'en jiangjun from 1918
      - Mianbang (綿榜), Yongshuo's fifth son, held the title of a third class fuguo jiangjun from 1799 to 1822, stripped of his title in 1822
      - Mianmo (綿默), Yongshuo's sixth son, held the title of a feng'en jiangjun from 1799 to 1854
        - Yiban (奕班), Mianmo's eldest son, held the title of a feng'en jiangjun from 1854 to 1875, had no male heir
      - Mian'ao (綿翺), Yongshuo's seventh son, held the title of a feng'en jiangjun from 1809 to 1829, stripped of his title in 1829
      - Mianxiang (綿翔), Yongshuo's eighth son, held the title of a feng'en jiangjun from 1812 to 1822
        - Yicui (奕萃), Mianxiang's eldest son, held the title of a feng'en jiangjun from 1823 to 1858
          - Zaice (載策), Yicui's eldest son, held the title of a feng'en jiangjun from 1858 to 1878, had no male heir
    - Yongtian (永恬), Hongming's third son, held the title of a first class fengguo jiangjun from 1757 to 1767
      - Mianxu (綿旭), Yongtian's eldest son, held the title of a feng'en jiangjun from 1767 to 1813
        - Yimei (奕湄), Mianxu's eldest son, held the title of a feng'en jiangjun from 1813 to 1826
        - Yidao (奕道), Mianxu's fourth son, held the title of a feng'en jiangjun from 1827 to 1844, had no male heir
    - Yongti (永梯), Hongming's fourth son, held the title of a first class fengguo jiangjun from 1762 to 1790
      - Miankuan (綿欵), Yongti's eldest son, held the title of a feng'en jiangjun from 1790 to 1826
        - Yipu (奕樸), Miankuan's eldest son, held the title of a feng'en jiangjun from 1826 to 1859
          - Zaitun (載屯), Yipu's eldest son, held the title of a feng'en jiangjun from 1827 to 1881, had no male heir

== Family tree ==
Yunti 允禵 (16 January 1688 – 16 February 1755); Prince Xunqin of the Second Rank 恂勤郡王 (12 April 1748 – 16 February 1755)
Hongming 弘明 (25 April 1705 – 4 February 1767); Gongqin Beile 恭勤貝勒 (December 1735 – 4 February 1767)
Yongshuo 永碩 (1736–1808); Beizi 貝子 (1767–1808)
Mianling 綿齡 (1776–1824); Feng'en Zhenguo Gong 奉恩鎮國公 (1808–1824)
Yixing 奕興 (1812–1858); Feng'en Zhenguo Gong 奉恩鎮國公 (1824–1858)
Zaisen 載森 (1843–1887); Buru Bafen Zhenguo Gong 不入八分鎮國公 (1858–1887)
Pubo 溥博 (1872–1894); Buru Bafen Zhenguo Gong 不入八分鎮國公 (1887–1894)	Puduo 溥多 (1879–?); Buru Bafen Zhenguo Gong 不入八分鎮國公 (1895–?)
Yubao 毓寶 (1903–?)

== See also ==
- Royal and noble ranks of the Qing dynasty
