= The Book and the Sword (1994 TV series) =

1994 Chinese TV series

- VCD cover
- 新书剑恩仇录
- Genre: Wuxia
- Based on: The Book and the Sword by Jin Yong
- Starring: Huang Haibing; Wang Jinghua; Yang Yanuo; Wang Weiguo; Wang Zhifei; Cao Ying; Yang Fan; Ma Li
- Opening theme: "Beauty and Red Flower" (红颜红花) by Mao Amin and Yu Long
- Ending theme: "Gratitudes and Grievances Connected by Red Threads" (恩恩怨怨红线牵) by Yang Yang
- Country of origin: China
- Original language: Mandarin
- No. of episodes: 32

Production
- Production location: China
- Running time: ≈45 minutes per episode
- Production company: CCTV

Original release
- Network: CCTV
- Release: 1994 – 1994

The Book and the Sword (新书剑恩仇录) is a Chinese wuxia television series adapted from the novel of the same title by Jin Yong. The series was first broadcast on CCTV in China in 1994.

== Cast ==
- Huang Haibing as Chen Jialuo
- Wang Jinghua as Huoqingtong
- Yang Yanuo as Princess Fragrance
- Wang Weiguo as the Qianlong Emperor
- Wang Zhifei as Yu Yutong
- Cao Ying as Li Yuanzhi
- Yang Fan as Wen Tailai
- Ma Li as Luo Bing
- Chen Jiming as Xu Tianhong
- Ma Li as Zhou Qi
- Zhang Tong as Lu Feiqing
- Zhao Jian as Zhang Zhaozhong
- Zhao Jun as Zhao Banshan
- Quan Yu as Taoist Wuchen
- Hao Wei as Xinyan
- Wu Weidong as Yu Wanting
- Liu Changsheng as Yuan Shixiao
- Xue Wencheng as Li Kexiu
- Yu Yuexian as Yuruyi
- Fan Liqiang as Bai Zhen
- Liu Dagang as the Yongzheng Emperor
- Zheng Weili as Xu Chaosheng
