= Princess Fragrance (film) =

1987 Hong Kong film by Ann Hui

- VCD cover art
- 香香公主
- Directed by: Ann Hui
- Screenplay by: Chun Sai-sam
- Based on: The Book and the Sword by Jin Yong
- Produced by: Shen Minhui; Guo Fengqi
- Cinematography: Bill Wong
- Edited by: Chau Muk-leung
- Music by: Chow Git; Law Wing-fai
- Production company: Sil-Metropole Organisation
- Release date: 28 August 1987
- Running time: 94 minutes
- Country: Hong Kong
- Language: Mandarin
- Box office: HK$5,608,797

Princess Fragrance (香香公主), also known as Gebi Enchou Lu (戈壁恩仇錄), is a 1987 Hong Kong wuxia film adapted from the novel The Book and the Sword by Jin Yong. Directed by Ann Hui, it is a sequel to The Romance of Book and Sword, which was released earlier in the same month. The film is largely seen as a faithful adaptation of the novel; however, it is less available now due to limited releases on VCD and DVD.

== Synopsis ==
The film covers the second half of the novel The Book and the Sword. It introduces another protagonist, Princess Fragrance, who does not appear in the first film. Fuk'anggan does not appear in the film.

== Cast ==
- Zhang Duofu as Chen Jialuo
- Aiyinuo as Princess Fragrance
- Chang Dashi as the Qianlong Emperor
- Liu Jia as Huoqingtong
- Ding Cuihua as Luo Bing
- Lü Yongquan as Taoist Wuchen
- Yu Dalu as Zhao Banshan
- Guo Bichuan as Wen Tailai
- Wang Jingqiu as Zhang Jin
- Hou Changrong as Yu Yutong
- Chen Youwang as Xu Tianhong
- Ren Naichang as Shi Shuangying
- Zhang Jun as Chang Bozhi
- Wang Wei as Chang Hezhi
- Zheng Jianhua as Jiang Sigen
- Fu Yongcai as Wei Chunhua
- Sun Chenxi as Xinyan
- Wang Hongtao as Yu Wanting
- Wu Chunsheng as Zhang Zhaozhong
- Yang Junsheng as Heshen
- Ding Tao as Zhaohui
- A'Si'er as Dahu
- Kuli Sitan as Erhu
- Fan Yin as Sanhu
- Jiapa'er as Sihu
- Hadi'er as Muzhuolun
- Aniwa'er as Huo'ayi
