= Book and Sword Chronicles =

1984 Taiwanese TV series

- 書劍江山
- Genre: Wuxia
- Based on: The Book and the Sword by Jin Yong
- Screenplay by: Shen Jiang; Liang Haiqiang; Jian Baixin
- Starring: Yu Tien-lung; Sam-Sam; Yang Liyin; Tang Tai; Ban-Ban; Tsai Hong; Angela Mao
- Country of origin: Taiwan
- Original language: Mandarin
- No. of episodes: 11

Production
- Producer: He Guanzhang
- Production location: Taiwan
- Running time: ≈45 minutes per episode

Original release
- Network: TTV
- Release: 14 July 1984

Book and Sword Chronicles (書劍江山) is a Taiwanese wuxia television series adapted from the novel The Book and the Sword by Jin Yong. It was first broadcast on TTV in Taiwan in 1984.

== Cast ==
- Yu Tien-lung as Chen Jialuo / the Qianlong Emperor
- Sam-Sam as Huoqingtong
- Yang Liyin as Princess Fragrance
- Tang Tai as Yu Yutong
- Ban-Ban as Li Yuanzhi
- Tsai Hong as Wen Tailai
- Angela Mao as Luo Bing
- Chang Ying-chi as Xu Tianhong
- Shang-kuan Ming-li as Zhou Qi
- Lu Di as Lu Feiqing
- Tien Feng as Zhang Zhaozhong
- Wan Chieh as Zhou Zhongying
- Cheng Hsiao-wei as Zhou Zhongying's wife
- Yi Yuen as Yuan Shixiao
- Lung Fei as Yu Wanting
- Han Chiang as Zhaohui
- Chen Chen as Tong Zhaohe
- He Wei-hsiung as Yan Shizhang
- Hu Kuang as Li Kexiu
- Zhang Yuen as Li Kexiu's wife
- Chin Hao as Zeng Tunan
- Fan Wei as Muzhuolun
- Hu Chun as Nasreddin
- Pan Chang-ming as Shi Shuangying
- Ma Chi-jen as Zhang Jin
- Yu Sung-chao as Jiang Sigen
- Lung Wei as Meng Jianxiong
- Chang Yi-kui as Rui Dalin
