= Consort Rong (Qianlong) =

Consort of Qianlong Emperor (1734–1788)

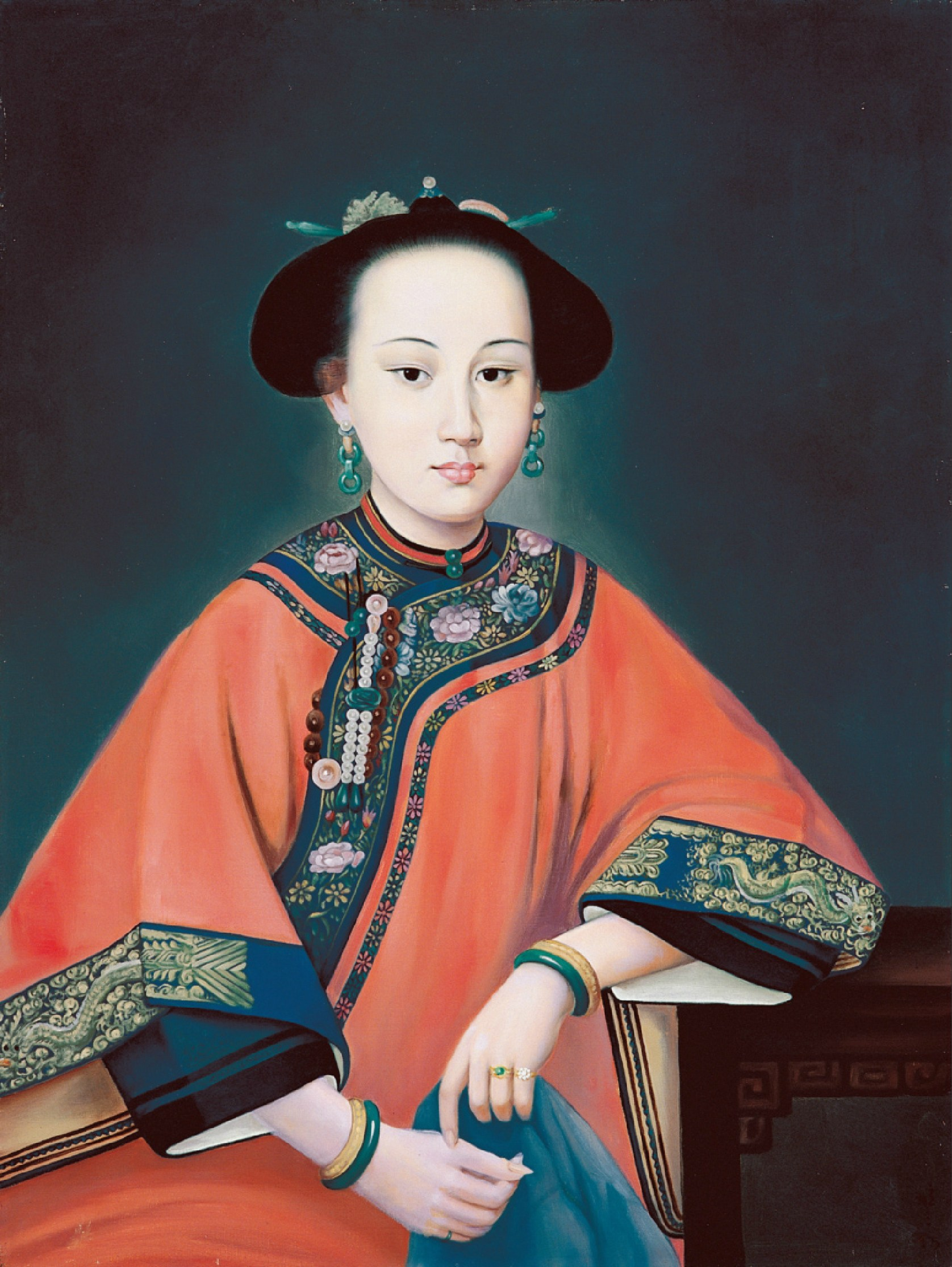
- Portrait in the mid-18th century
- Born: 10 October 1734; Ili Valley, Dzungar Khanate
- Died: 24 May 1788 (aged 53); Beijing, China
- Burial: Yu Mausoleum, Eastern Qing tombs
- Spouse: Qianlong Emperor (m. 1760)
- House: Hezhuo (和卓; by birth); Aisin Gioro (by marriage)
- Religion: Islam

Consort Rong
- Traditional Chinese: 容妃
- Simplified Chinese: 容妃
Transcriptions
Standard Mandarin
- Hanyu Pinyin: Róng Fēi

Consort Rong (Chinese: 容妃; pinyin: Róng Fēi; 10 October 1734 – 24 May 1788), from the Uyghur minority, was a consort of the Qianlong Emperor.

== Life ==
=== Family background ===
Consort Rong was from Xinjiang, and belonged to the Uyghur minority. She came from a line of the Makhdumzada Khoja clan, sometimes transliterated as Hezhuo (和卓) or Huozhuo (霍卓). She was the daughter of the Muslim Hojalai, and a descendant of Gambar, founder of the Shizu sect. She had one elder brother, Turdu.

=== Yongzheng era ===
The future Consort Rong was born on 15 September of the twelfth year of the reign of Yongzheng Emperor, which translates to 10 October 1734 in the Gregorian calendar.

=== Qianlong era ===
Lady Hezhuo entered the Forbidden City on 20 March 1760, when she was twenty-six years old, and the Qianlong Emperor was twenty-three years older than her. She had been selected to enter the imperial palace after her older brother Turdu was honoured by the emperor with a title of his part in quelling a rebellion in his native region of Xinjiang. In 1761, she was given the title of "Noble Lady He" (和貴人), and the emperor sent a maid of honour as a wife to her older brother.

In May or June 1762, Lady Hezhuo was promoted to "Concubine Rong" (容嬪). In the same year, her brother was made duke of Fuguo in reward for his assistance against the rebels in southern Xinjiang. She accompanied the court when it debouched for Rehe and Mulan Hunting grounds. In 1765, she and her brother were invited to join the emperor's fourth inspection trip to southern China.

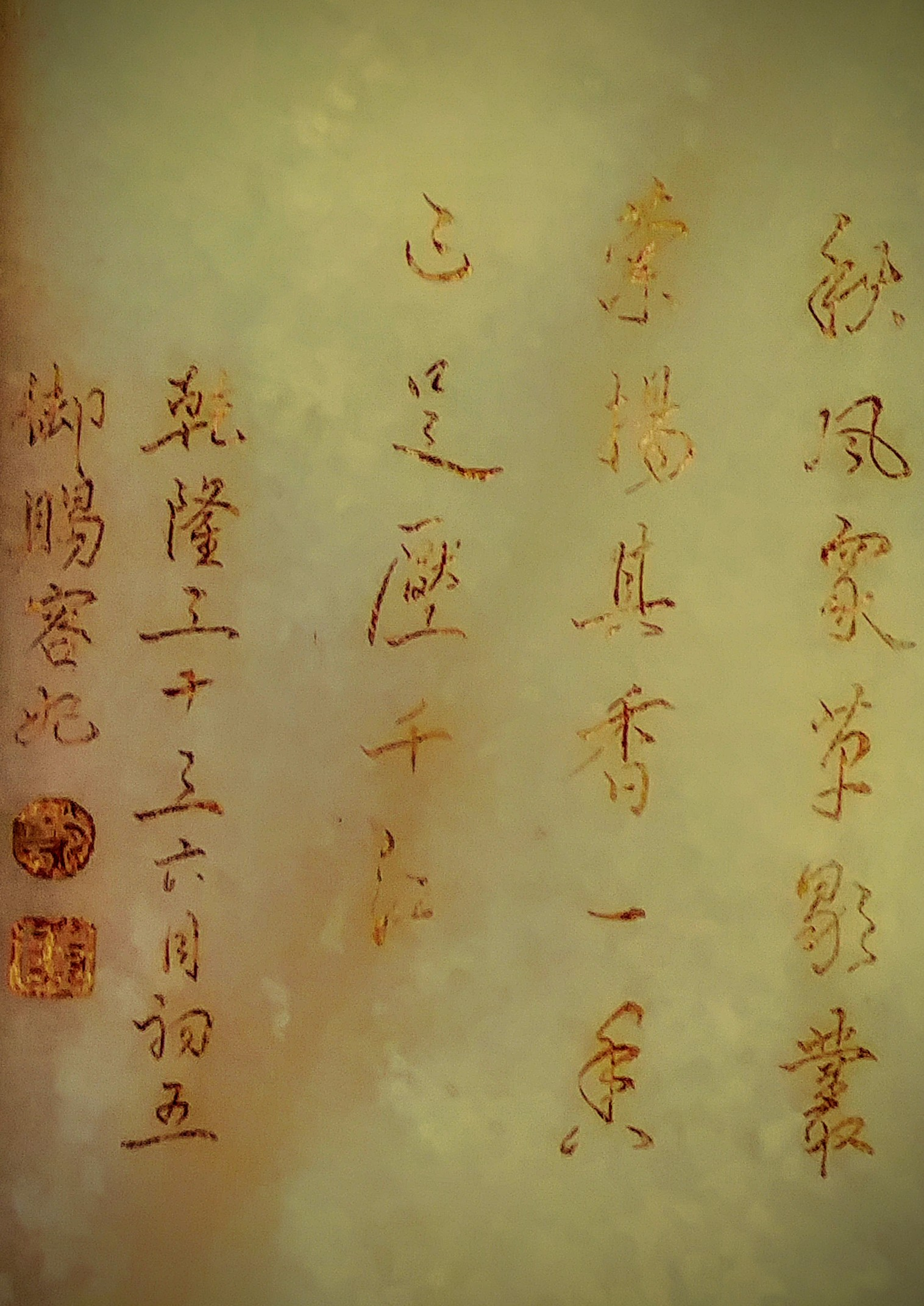
Jade plaque with verse, Imperial gift to Consort Rong

In November or December 1768, Lady Hezhuo was promoted to "Consort Rong" (容妃). The emperor had ordered a special hat of velvet for her because there was a shortage of Manchu court headwear. The emperor had arranged for her a Uyghur chef, and a Muslim palace with engravings of texts from the Quran, called Fangwai Guan. The emperor even built a mosque for her at the Summer Palace near Beijing. In 1771, she joined the eastern tour to Tiashan and Qufu.

Lady Hezhuo found such a great favour with the emperor, that in 1774, he celebrated her fortieth birthday four months ahead of time. During the autumn hunting festival that year, she was placed in second position among the imperial consorts who joined the tour. She enjoyed a high prestige in the imperial palace, with a prominent seat reserved for her in banquets. At an early 1779 banquet at the Old Summer Palace, she took the head of the western table. By the end of the year, she had advanced to the second position at the eastern table. In 1784, the emperor celebrated her fiftieth birthday.

=== Death and burial ===
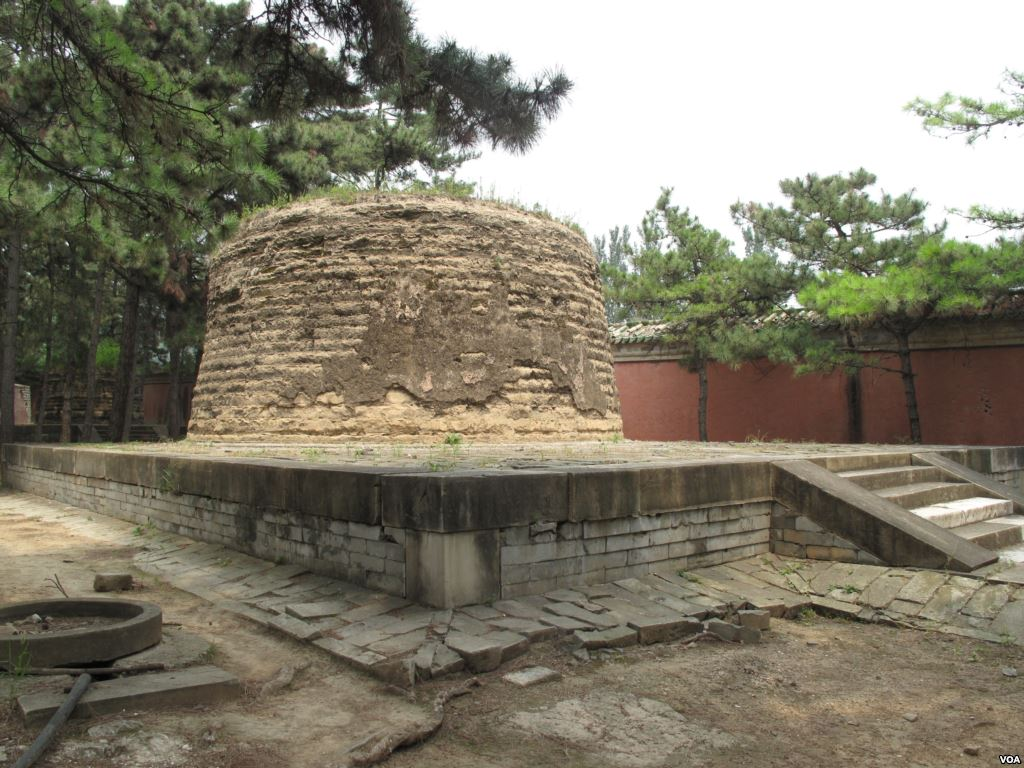
Tomb of Consort Rong

Lady Hezhuo died on 24 May 1788. On 25 May, Grand Secretary Heshen conveyed an imperial edict ordering that her belongings be distributed. On 26 May, the emperor inspected her possessions. Some items were kept for future use, while others—including jewelry, robes, and silverware—were given to the emperor’s Princess Hexiao (engaged to Heshen's son) and Princess Hejing. Certain items were placed in her coffin and on her altar for mourning. Her sisters, other consorts, and her household staff also received portions of her possessions.

Her coffin was moved from the West Garden to Jing'an zuang, and she was interred in October in the Yu Mausoleum of the Eastern Qing tombs. Her tomb was opened and put in order in October 1979, and in 1983, it was opened for public access. Her coffin bears an inscription from the Quran written in Arabic.

== Titles ==
During the reign of the Yongzheng Emperor (r. 1722–1735):

- Lady Hezhuo (from 10 October 1734)

During the reign of the Qianlong Emperor (r. 1735–1796):

- Noble Lady He (和貴人; from 1761), sixth rank consort
- Concubine Rong (容嫔; from May/June 1762), fifth rank consort
- Consort Rong (容妃; from November/December 1768), fourth rank consort

== Legacy ==
Her story changed over time, transforming her into a fictional character Xiang Fei (香妃; Fragrant Consort) around the early 1920s. Movies and TV series were made about the fictitious Fragrant Consort.

== See also ==
- Ranks of imperial consorts in China § Qing
- Royal and noble ranks of the Qing dynasty
- Fragrant Concubine (Chinese legend, possibly inspired by Consort Rong)

== Sources ==
- Aierken, Yipaer (2019). Ethnicity and Identity in the Art of Giuseppe Castiglione (PDF) (Master Thesis). Arizona State University.
- Millward, James A. (1994). "A Uyghur Muslim in Qianlong's Court: The Meanings of the Fragrant Concubine". The Journal of Asian Studies. 53 (2): 427–458. doi:10.2307/2059841. JSTOR 2059841. S2CID 154062771.
- Lee, Lily Xiao Hong; Lau, Clara; Stefanowska, A.D. (17 July 2015). Biographical Dictionary of Chinese Women: v. 1: The Qing Period, 1644-1911. Routledge. ISBN 978-1-317-47588-0.
