= The Book and the Sword =

1955–1956 wuxia novel by Jin Yong

- Chapter 10 of The Book and the Sword, from page 6 of 5 August 1955 issue of the Hong Kong newspaper New Evening Post.
- Author: Jin Yong
- Original title: 書劍恩仇錄
- Translator: Graham Earnshaw
- Language: Chinese
- Genre: Wuxia; Historical fiction
- Publisher: The New Evening Post (serial); Oxford University Press (translation)
- Publication date: 8 February 1955
- Publication place: Hong Kong
- English publication date: 2005
- Media type: Print
- ISBN: 9780195907278
- Preceded by: A Deadly Secret
- Followed by: The Young Flying Fox

The Book and the Sword
- Traditional Chinese: 書劍恩仇錄
- Simplified Chinese: 书剑恩仇录
- Literal meaning: Chronicles of the Book and the Sword: Gratitude and Vengeance
Transcriptions
Standard Mandarin
- Hanyu Pinyin: Shū Jiàn Ēn Chóu Lù
Yue: Cantonese
- Jyutping: Syu^{1} Gim^{3} Jan^{1} Sau^{4} Luk^{6}

The Book and the Sword (書劍恩仇錄) is a wuxia novel by Jin Yong (Louis Cha). First serialised between 8 February 1955 and 5 September 1956 in the Hong Kong newspaper The New Evening Post, it is also Jin Yong's debut novel.

Set in 18th-century China during the Manchu-led Qing dynasty, the novel follows the quest of the Red Flower Society, a secret society aiming to overthrow the Qing government, and their entanglements with a Uyghur tribe in southern Xinjiang. The "book" in the title refers to a Quran that was stolen from the tribe while the "sword" refers to a sword given to the protagonist, Chen Jialuo, by his first romantic partner, Huoqingtong. Historical figures such as the Qianlong Emperor, Zhaohui, Heshen, Zheng Banqiao and Fuk'anggan also make appearances or are mentioned by name in the novel. One of the protagonists, Princess Fragrance, is loosely based on the Fragrant Concubine.

Alternative English titles of the novel include Book and Sword: Gratitude and Revenge and The Romance of the Book and Sword.

== Plot ==
The novel is set in 18th-century China during the reign of the Qianlong Emperor of the Manchu-led Qing dynasty. The Red Flower Society is a secret society aiming to overthrow the Qing dynasty and restore Han Chinese rule in China. It is led by 15 heroes, with Chen Jialuo as their chief. At the beginning of the novel, the emperor sends soldiers to ambush and arrest Wen Tailai, the society's fourth leader, in order to silence him because he knows a secret about the emperor.

The main plot, which is intertwined with two or more extensive subplots, follows the heroes' repeated attempts to rescue Wen Tailai while he is being escorted by a convoy of soldiers to Beijing. Along the way, the heroes encounter some Uyghur tribesmen who are pursuing a group of mercenaries who have robbed them of their holy artifact, a Quran. Chen Jialuo aids the tribesmen in defeating the mercenaries and recovers the holy book, earning the respect and admiration of Huoqingtong, the tribe leader's daughter. Throughout the novel, some of the heroes eventually find their future spouses after braving danger together: Xu Tianhong and Yu Yutong marry Zhou Qi and Li Yuanzhi respectively.

Chen Jialuo and the heroes follow Wen Tailai's trail to Hangzhou, where Chen coincidentally meets and befriends the Qianlong Emperor, who is in disguise as a rich man. However, after they discover each other's true identities, they become suspicious and wary of each other. When the emperor's best warriors are defeated by the heroes in a martial arts contest, the emperor feels humiliated and wants to summon the armed forces stationed in Hangzhou to destroy the Red Flower Society. However, he eventually refrains from doing so when he learns that the society has a vast network of underground connections in Hangzhou which has penetrated even the armed forces.

When Chen Jialuo finally rescues Wen Tailai, he is surprised to learn that the Qianlong Emperor is not a Manchu, but a Han Chinese. Wen Tailai also reveals that the emperor is actually Chen Jialuo's elder brother. Shortly after he was born, the emperor had been switched places with a newborn princess and had been raised as a son of the Yongzheng Emperor before he eventually inherited the throne. Chen Jialuo and the heroes kidnap the emperor and hold him hostage in the Liuhe Pagoda, where they try to persuade him to acknowledge his ethnicity. They suggest that he use his privileged status to drive the Manchus out of the Central Plains, and assure him that he will remain as the emperor after that. The emperor reluctantly agrees and swears an oath of alliance with the heroes.

Around the same time, the Qing army invades southern Xinjiang where the Uyghur tribe lives, so Chen Jialuo travels there to help his friends. He meets Huoqingtong and her younger sister, Kasili (Princess Fragrance). After falling in love with Kasili, he finds himself entangled in a love triangle because Huoqingtong also has romantic feelings for him. The Uyghur tribe is eventually annihilated by the Qing army while Kasili is captured and brought to Beijing.

The Qianlong Emperor is attracted to Kasili's beauty and tries to force her to become his concubine but she refuses. Chen Jialuo infiltrates the palace to meet the emperor, reminds him about their oath, and promises him that he will persuade Kasili to be his concubine. Kasili later discovers that the emperor has no intention of keeping his promise and has been secretly planning to lure the Red Flower Society into a trap and destroy them. After Kasili commits suicide to warn Chen Jialuo, the society's leaders feel outraged by the emperor's betrayal so they storm the palace. The conflict concludes with the emperor coming to a reluctant truce with the Red Flower Society. Chen Jialuo and his friends then head towards the Western Regions after paying their respects at Kasili's tomb.

== Adaptations ==
=== Films ===
| Year | Production | Main cast | Additional information |
|---|---|---|---|
| 1960 | Emei Film Company (Hong Kong) | Cheung Ying, Tsi Law-lin, Yung Siu-yee | See The Book and the Sword |
| 1981 | Shaw Brothers Studio (Hong Kong) | Ti Lung, Jason Pai | See Emperor and His Brother |
| 1987 | Hong Kong | Zhang Duofu, Chang Dashi, Liu Jia, Aiyinuo | See The Romance of Book and Sword and Princess Fragrance. |
| 2023 | Mainland China | Li Mingxuan, Cui Zhenzhen, Wang Jiming | |

=== Television ===
| Year | Production | Main cast | Additional information |
|---|---|---|---|
| 1976 | TVB (Hong Kong) | Adam Cheng, Liza Wang, Candice Yu | See The Legend of the Book and the Sword (1976 TV series) |
| 1984 | TTV (Taiwan) | Yu Tien-lung, Sam-sam, Yang Liyin | See Book and Sword Chronicles |
| 1987 | TVB (Hong Kong) | Pang Man-kin, Jacqueline Law, Fiona Leung, Simon Yam | See The Legend of the Book and the Sword (1987 TV series) |
| 1992 | CTS (Taiwan) | Kenny Ho, Shen Meng-sheng, Leanne Liu, Fu Chuan | See The Book and the Sword (1992 TV series) |
| 1994 | CCTV (Mainland China) | Huang Haibing, Wang Weiguo, Wang Jinghua, Yang Yanuo | See The Book and the Sword (1994 TV series) |
| 2002 | Chinese Entertainment Shanghai (various countries) | Vincent Zhao, Chen Chao-jung (Aaron Chen), Esther Kwan, Rachel Ngan | See Book and Sword, Gratitude and Revenge |
| 2008 | Mainland China | Adam Cheng, Liu Dekai, Qiao Zhenyu, Niki Chow, Liu Ying | See The Book and the Sword (2008 TV series) |

=== Radio ===
In 1999, Hong Kong's RTHK produced a 32-episodes radio drama based on the novel, voiced by Tse Kwan-ho, Gigi Leung, Chow Kwok-fung and Jacqueline Pang.
