= Book and Sword, Gratitude and Revenge =

2002 Chinese-Taiwanese-Hong Kong-Singaporean TV series

- DVD cover
- Also known as: The Book and the Sword; The Romance of the Book and Sword
- 书剑恩仇录
- Genre: Wuxia
- Based on: The Book and the Sword by Jin Yong
- Directed by: Lee Kwok-lap
- Starring: Vincent Zhao; Esther Kwan; Rachel Ngan; Chen Chao-jung; Ray Lui; Vicky Chen; Tse Kwan-ho; Sun Li; Joey Leung; Kym Ng
- Opening theme: "Laughing at Life" (风月笑平生) by Lunhui Band
- Ending theme: "Joyful and Carefree" (乐逍遥) by Wang Zheng; "Learned" (学会) by Evonne Hsu
- Countries of origin: China; Taiwan; Hong Kong; Singapore
- Original language: Mandarin
- No. of episodes: 40

Production
- Production location: China
- Running time: ≈45 minutes per episode
- Production companies: Chinese Entertainment Shanghai; CTV; Tangren Media; SPH MediaWorks

Original release
- Network: CTV (Taiwan)
- Release: 2002 – 2002

Book and Sword, Gratitude and Revenge (书剑恩仇录) is a 2002 wuxia television series adapted from the novel The Book and the Sword by Jin Yong. Directed by Lee Kwok-lap, the series starred cast members from mainland China, Taiwan, Hong Kong, and Singapore. It was first broadcast in 2002 on CTV in Taiwan.

== Cast ==
- Vincent Zhao as Chen Jialuo
- Esther Kwan as Huoqingtong
- Rachel Ngan as Princess Fragrance
- Chen Chao-jung as the Qianlong Emperor
- Ray Lui as Wen Tailai
- Vicky Chen as Luo Bing
- Tse Kwan-ho as Yu Yutong
- Leslie Sun as Li Yuanzhi
- Joey Leung as Xu Tianhong
- Kym Ng as Zhou Qi
- Guo Liang as Zhang Zhaozhong
- Xu Lu as Yuruyi
- Cheng Pei-pei as Empress Dowager Chongqing
- Zhang Tielin as Yu Wanting
- Yang Guang as Lu Feiqing
- Wu Yue as Zhao Banshan
- Mao Hu as Zhang Jin
- Che Gen as Jiang Sigen
- Feng Pengfei as Xinyan
- Ho Kwai-lam as Li Kexiu
- Deli Ge'er as Muzhuolun
- Zhang Hongming as Huo'ayi
- Lu Yong as Bai Zhen
- Xi Hong as the Empress
- Bryan Leung as Yuan Shixiao
- Elvis Tsui as Tuying
- Sui Yongqing as Xuediao
- Sun Changhong as Zhaohui
- Li Qingxiang as Zhou Zhongying
- Jia Yanpeng as Wei Chunhua
- Zhao Xiaozuo as Yang Chengxie
- Guo Qiming as Shi Shuangying
- Wang Xiaohong as Zhou Zhongying's wife
- Zhang Wei as Taoist Wuchen
- Guo Changhui as Chang Hezhi
- Jin Ming as Chang Bozhi
