= Empress Xiaoshengxian =

Chinese empress dowager (1692–1777)

- Empress Dowager Chongqing
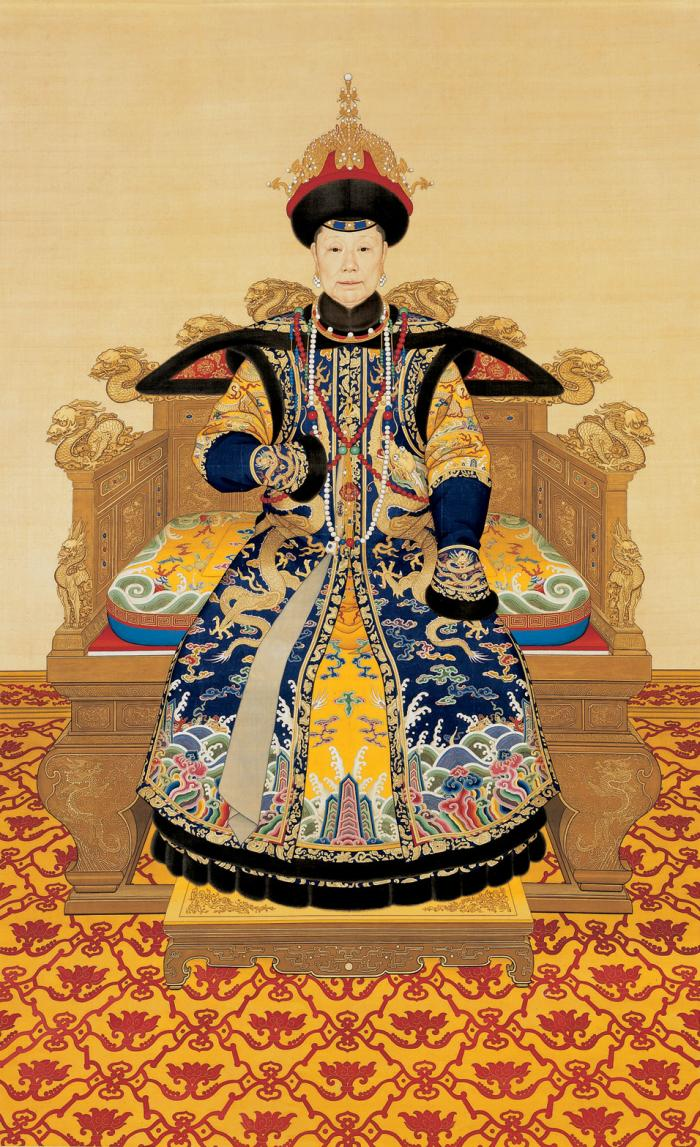
- Portrait, 1751

Empress dowager of the Qing dynasty
- Tenure: 8 October 1735 – 2 March 1777
- Predecessor: Empress Dowager Renshou
- Successor: Empress Dowager Gongci
- Born: 12 January 1692 (康熙三十年 十一月 二十五日)
- Died: 2 March 1777 (aged 85) (乾隆四十二年 正月 二十三日); Changchun Xianguan, Old Summer Palace
- Burial: Tai Mausoleum, Western Qing tombs
- Spouse: Yongzheng Emperor (m. 1705; died 1735)
- Issue: Qianlong Emperor
Posthumous name
- Empress Xiaosheng Cixuan Kanghui Dunhe Chenghui Renmu Jingtian Guangsheng Xian (孝聖慈宣康惠敦和誠徽仁穆敬天光聖憲皇后)
- House: Niohuru (鈕祜祿)
- Father: Lingzhu
- Mother: Lady Peng

Empress Xiaoshengxian
- Traditional Chinese: 孝聖憲皇后
- Simplified Chinese: 孝圣宪皇后
Transcriptions
Standard Mandarin
- Hanyu Pinyin: Xiàoshèngxiàn Huánghòu

Empress Xiaoshengxian (12 January 1692 – 2 March 1777) was a posthumous name bestowed to the consort of Yinzhen, the Yongzheng Emperor and mother of Hongli, the Qianlong Emperor. She was honoured as Empress Mother Chongqing during the reign of her son and posthumously honoured as empress, although she never held the rank of empress consort during her lifetime. She ruled the Chinese Imperial Harem and remained as the Empress Dowager of the Qing Dynasty for 42 years, longer than the reign periods of even many Emperors.

When the empress seat was vacant after Empress Xiaojingxian of the Ulanara clan's death, she was placed in charge of the imperial harem as the highest ranked concubine in that time. The Qianlong Emperor held her in high regard and often consulted her for advice. She died in 1777 and outlived many of her son's consorts.

== Family background ==
Empress Xiaoshengxian's personal name was unknown and not recorded in history. She was born to the upper class Niohuru clan in Beijing.

- Father: Lingzhu (凌柱; 1664–1754), served as a fourth rank military official (四品典儀), and held the title of a first class duke (一等公)
  - Paternal grandfather: Wulu (吳祿), Eidu's cousin once removed
  - Paternal grandmother: Lady Qiao
- Mother: Lady Peng
  - Maternal grandfather: Peng Wugong (彭武功)
- Four brothers

== Kangxi era ==
The future Empress Xiaoshengxian was born on the 25th day of the 11th lunar month in the 30th year of the reign of the Kangxi Emperor, which translates to 12 January 1692 in the Gregorian calendar. She was born into the prominent Niohuru clan.

In 1705, aged thirteen, when she went to the capital, it so happened that the ladies of noble birth were there awaiting selection to the palace. She followed them to watch the excitement, and the door guards let her in, thinking that she was one of the candidates. It was only when the selection began that the leading officials found out that she was not on the list. They told Yinzhen, the fourth son of the Kangxi Emperor, who asked them to include her in the last group. She was then selected because of her regular features and tall figure. She was then sent to the prince's residence and received the title of Gege.

She was, however, not in the prince's good graces. He, apart from his primary wife, favoured his concubines Li, Geng, and Nian. In summer 1710, he developed a disease that made his attendants unwilling to be too close to him. She, however, looked after him day and night, and he recovered from the illness after two months. He was grateful to her for her loyalty, and the following year, on 25 September 1711, she gave birth to his fourth son, Prince Hongli. Soon after the birth, she fell out of favor again.

In 1722, Prince Yinzhen, who was made Prince Yong, invited the Kangxi Emperor to his residence, Yuanmingyuan, where he met his grandson, eleven year-old Prince Hongli, and took him to his own palace to rear him; the two lived together for six months. The Kangxi Emperor's love for Hongli was sufficient to raise the future Empress Xiaoshengxian's status, whom the emperor had once given an audition and praised as "a person with good fortune".

== Yongzheng era ==
The Kangxi Emperor died on 20 December 1722 and was succeeded by Yinzhen, who was enthroned as the Yongzheng Emperor. On 28 March 1723, Lady Niohuru was granted the title "Consort Xi". In 1730, she was elevated to "Noble Consort Xi". When the Yongzheng Emperor's empress consort, Empress Xiaojingxian, died on 29 October 1731, Noble Consort Xi was placed in charge of the emperor's harem because she was the highest ranking consort at that time.

== Qianlong era ==
The Yongzheng Emperor died on 8 October 1735 and was succeeded by Hongli, who was enthroned as the Qianlong Emperor. As the birth mother of the reigning emperor, Noble Consort Xi was honoured as (the) "Divine Mother Empress Dowager Chongqing".

The Qianlong Emperor held his mother in high regard and often consulted her for advice. Some believe that she may have been behind the emperor's ill-fated selection of Lady Nara to be his second empress consort. The Qianlong Emperor often visited his mother. The Empress Dowager also always accompanied her son on his excursions to Shenyang and the Yangtze River Delta. In her old age, when the Empress Dowager was no longer fit to travel, the Qianlong Emperor stopped all his trips and only resumed them after her death.

The Empress dowager's 60th birthday was lavishly celebrated. The Qianlong Emperor ordered the roads decorated from Beijing to the Summer Palace, Chinese poems were read in her honour and sacrifices were made to the gods by the emperor and the entire imperial court. In her honour, the emperor also ordered the dredging of a lake at the Garden of Clear Ripples, which he named Kunming Lake, as well as renovated buildings on the lake shore.

Empress Dowager Chongqing died on 2 March 1777. She was interred in a separate tomb in the Tai Mausoleum of the Western Qing tombs.

== Titles ==
- During the reign of the Kangxi Emperor (r. 1661–1722):
  - Lady Niohuru (钮祜禄氏; from 12 January 1692)
  - Mistress (格格; from 1705), third rank consort
- During the reign of the Yongzheng Emperor (r. 1722–1735):
  - Consort Xi (熹妃; from 28 March 1723), fourth rank consort
  - Noble Consort Xi (熹貴妃; from 1730 to 1735), third rank consort
- During the reign of the Qianlong Emperor (r. 1735–1796):
  - Empress Dowager Chongqing (崇慶聖母皇太后; from 8 October 1735)
  - Empress Xiaoshengxian (孝聖憲皇后; from 1777)

== Issue ==
- As Mistress :
  - Hongli (弘曆; 25 September 1711 – 7 February 1799), the Yongzheng Emperor's fifth (fourth) son, enthroned on 18 October 1735 as the Qianlong Emperor

== Gallery ==
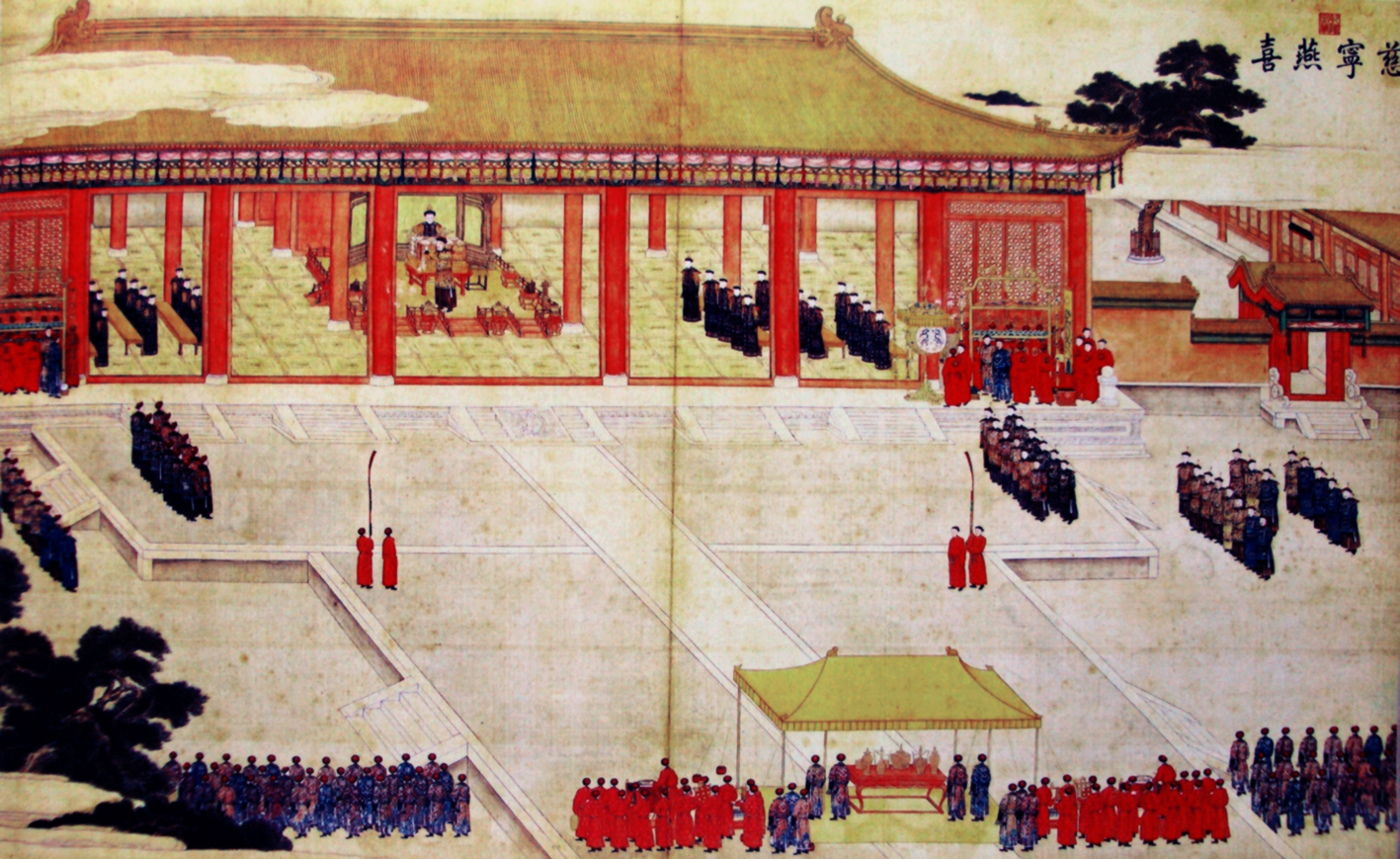
Empress Xiaoshengxian during a banquet

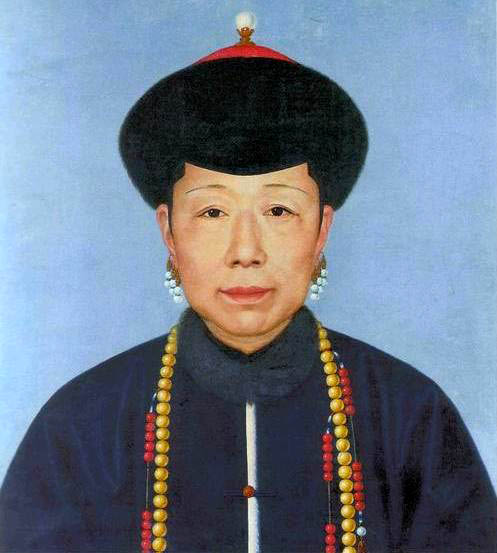
Empress Xiaoshengxian at the age of 60

== In fiction and popular culture ==
- Portrayed by Teresa Ha in Take Care, Your Highness! (1985)
- Portrayed by Chan Choiyin in The Rise and Fall of Qing Dynasty (1988)
- Portrayed by Zhao Minfen in My Fair Princess (1998) and My Fair Princess III (2003)
- Portrayed by Zhao Minfen, Yan Minqiu and Wang Liyuan in The Eloquent Ji Xiaolan (2002)
- Portrayed by Cheng Pei-pei in Book and Sword, Gratitude and Revenge (2002)
- Portrayed by Li Li in Jiangshan Weizhong (2002)
- Portrayed by Lisa Lu in Qianlong Dynasty (2003)
- Portrayed by Shi Xiaoqun in Huang Taizi Mishi (2004)
- Portrayed by Sally Chen in The Book and the Sword (2009)
- Portrayed by Leanne Liu in New My Fair Princess (2011)
- Portrayed by Sun Li in Empresses in the Palace (2011)
- Portrayed by Yuan Shanshan in Palace II (2012)
- Portrayed by Lily Leung in Succession War (2018)
- Portrayed by Song Chunli in Story of Yanxi Palace (2018)
- Portrayed by Vivian Wu in Ruyi's Royal Love in the Palace (2018)
- Portrayed by Han Jiunuo in Love Story of Court Enemies (2020)

== See also ==
- Ranks of imperial consorts in China#Qing
- Royal and noble ranks of the Qing dynasty

== Notes ==
Empress Xiaoshengxian Niohuru Clan
Chinese royalty
Preceded by Empress Dowager Renshou (Xiaogongren) of the Uya clan	Empress dowager of China; 8 October 1735 – 2 March 1777	Succeeded by Empress Dowager Gongci (Xiaoherui) of the Niohuru clan
