= The Romance of Book and Sword =

1987 Hong Kong film by Ann Hui

- VCD cover
- 書劍恩仇錄
- Directed by: Ann Hui
- Screenplay by: Chun Sai-sam
- Based on: The Book and the Sword by Jin Yong
- Produced by: Shen Minhui; Guo Fengqi
- Cinematography: Bill Wong
- Edited by: Chau Muk-leung
- Music by: Gu Guanren; Law Wing-fai
- Production company: Sil-Metropole Organisation
- Release date: 13 August 1987
- Running time: 94 minutes
- Country: Hong Kong
- Language: Mandarin
- Box office: HK$5,991,706

The Romance of Book and Sword (書劍恩仇錄), also known as Jiangnan Shujian Qing (江南書劍情), is a 1987 Hong Kong wuxia film adapted from the novel The Book and the Sword by Jin Yong. Directed by Ann Hui, it was among the earliest Hong Kong films to be completely shot in mainland China with a full mainland Chinese cast. It was followed by a sequel, Princess Fragrance, which was released later in the same month and also directed by Ann Hui.

== Synopsis ==
The film covers the first half of the novel and ends with the truce between the Qianlong Emperor and the Red Flower Society at Liuhe Pagoda. The two major subplots in the novel are omitted: Li Yuanzhi and Zhou Qi do not appear in the film.

== Cast ==
- Zhang Duofu as Chen Jialuo
- Chang Dashi as the Qianlong Emperor
- Liu Jia as Huoqingtong
- Ding Cuihua as Luo Bing
- Lü Yongquan as Taoist Wuchen
- Yu Dalu as Zhao Banshan
- Guo Bichuan as Wen Tailai
- Wang Jingqiu as Zhang Jin
- Hou Changrong as Yu Yutong
- Chen Youwang as Xu Tianhong
- Ren Naichang as Shi Shuangying
- Zhang Jun as Chang Bozhi
- Wang Wei as Chang Hezhi
- Zheng Jianhua as Jiang Sigen
- Fu Yongcai as Wei Chunhua
- Sun Chenxi as Xinyan
- Wang Hongtao as Yu Wanting
- Wu Chunsheng as Zhang Zhaozhong
- Yang Junsheng as Heshen
- Ding Tao as Zhaohui
- Deng Jie as Chen Jialuo's mother
- Ge Lili as Qinghua
- Zhu Yi as Prince Su
- Zhang Xuehao as Li Kexiu
- Wang Wensheng as Long Jun
