= The Emperor and His Brother =

1981 Hong Kong film by Chor Yuen

- Japanese DVD cover
- 書劍恩仇錄
- Directed by: Chor Yuen
- Screenplay by: Ni Kuang
- Based on: The Book and the Sword by Jin Yong
- Produced by: Mona Fong
- Starring: Ti Lung; Jason Pai; Lo Lieh; Wen Hsueh-erh; Ku Feng
- Cinematography: Wong Chit
- Edited by: Chiang Hsing-lung; Yu Siu-fung
- Music by: Eddie H. Wang
- Production company: Shaw Brothers Studio
- Distributed by: Shaw Brothers Studio
- Release date: 23 July 1981
- Running time: 101 minutes
- Country: Hong Kong
- Language: Mandarin

The Emperor and His Brother (書劍恩仇錄) is a 1981 Hong Kong wuxia film adapted from the novel The Book and the Sword by Jin Yong. Produced by the Shaw Brothers Studio, the film was directed by Chor Yuen and starred Ti Lung, Jason Pai and Lo Lieh in the leading roles.

== Synopsis ==
The film is set in 18th-century China during the Qing dynasty. The Qianlong Emperor is not the legitimate ruler as he is actually a commoner's son who had switched places at birth with a newborn princess. He learns the truth when two members of the Red Flower Society, an anti-Qing secret organisation, contact him and seek his help in overthrowing the Qing dynasty and restoring the Ming dynasty.

Refusing to give up his status, the emperor orders the two men to be killed but one survives and gets captured. The Red Flower Society's chief, Chen Jialuo, is the emperor's younger brother. The brothers develop a tenuous relationship when the society's members attempt to rescue their captured comrade. Plotting an elaborate scheme to kidnap the emperor in exchange for their comrade's release, they hope to convince the emperor to acknowledge his background and join their cause.

When the exchange takes place, the emperor must ultimately keep up the pretence in order to remain in power. His chief henchman, Zhang Zhaozhong, is determined to destroy Chen Jialuo and the Red Flower Society. The opportunity comes when a martial arts contest is scheduled to be take place.

== Cast ==
- Ti Lung as Chen Jialuo / Chen Shiguan
- Jason Pai as the Qianlong Emperor
- Lo Lieh as Zhang Zhaozhong
- Ku Feng as Zhou Zhongying
- Wen Hsueh-erh as Zhou Qi
- Sun Chien as Xu Tianhong
- Chan Kei-kei as Luo Bing
- Tang Wai-ho as Wen Tailai
- Ku Kuan-chung as Yu Yutong
- Mandy Wong as Li Yuanzhi
- Wong Yung as Lu Feiqing
- Yeung Chi-hing as Zhao Banshan
- Kent Cheng as Yang Chengxie
- Chun Wong as Zhang Jin
- Linda Chu as Yu Ruyi
- Liu Lai-ling as Bian Wenlian
- Yau Chiu-ling as Wu Chanjuan
- Kwan Fung as Taoist Wuchen
- Ngai Fei as Wei Chunhua
- Yuen Wah as Chang Bozhi
- Wong Chi-ming as Shi Shuangying
- Lau Fong-sai as Xinyan
- Lee Kin-chung as Zhou Yingjie
- Teresa Ha as Mrs Zhou
- Lau Siu-kwan as Meng Jianxiong
- Wong Ching-ho as Song Shanpeng
- Jing Miao as Li Kexiu
- Yuen Ban as Bai Zhen
- Keung Hon as Wu Jiadong
- Shum Lo as Ma Shanjun
- Kam Kwan as Yu Wanting
- Ng Hong-sang as Chou Hu
- Yeung Hung as Chou Long
- Lam Sung-cheng as Long Tianxing
