= Fragrant Concubine =

Legendary Chinese consort of the Qianlong Emperor

The Fragrant Concubine (Chinese: 香妃; pinyin: Xiāng Fēi; Wade–Giles: Hsiang Fei; Uyghur: ئىپارخان / Iparxan / Ипархан) is a figure in Chinese legend who was taken as a consort by the Qianlong Emperor of the Qing dynasty in the 18th century. Although the stories about her are believed to be mythical, they may have been based on an actual concubine from western China who entered the imperial harem in 1760 and received the title "Imperial Consort Rong" (容妃; Róng Fēi). Qing Dynasty and Uyghur tellings of the legend of the Fragrant Concubine diverge greatly and her experience represents a powerful symbol for both cultures. The story became very popular during the early 20th century and has since been adapted into several plays, films and books.

== Qing legend ==
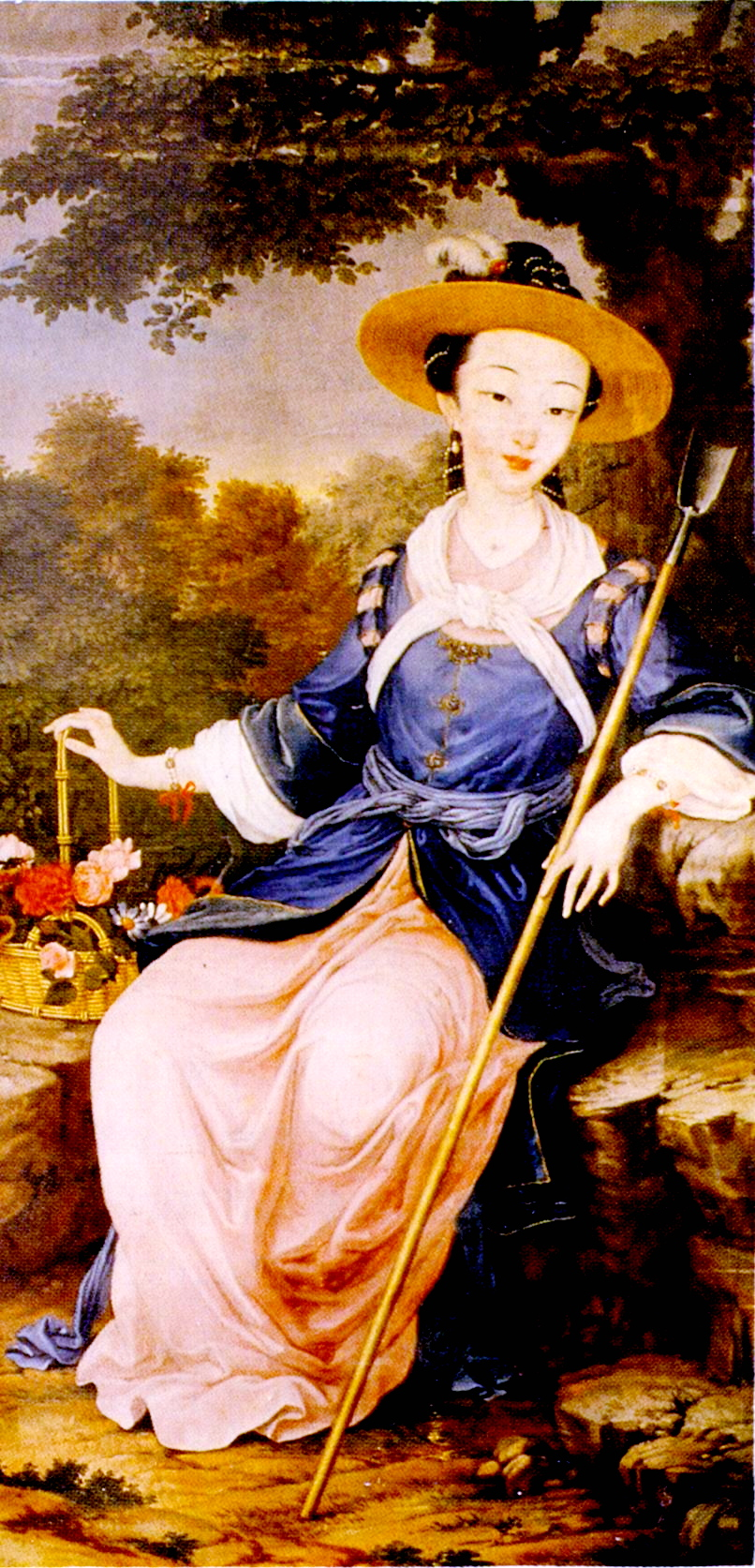
The Fragrant Concubine in Western dress

Although accounts vary as to some details, the basic story among Qing recounts the discovery by the Qianlong Emperor of a Kashgarian Muslim woman named Iparhan ("Musky Woman"), the granddaughter of Afaq Khoja, a local chieftain in the oasis city of Kashgar. Even more remarkable than her beauty was the scent her body naturally produced; captivated, the emperor sought her as an Imperial Consort for his harem. She was given as a gift to the emperor and carefully escorted all the way to the imperial palace in Beijing, washing every day along the road in camel's milk to preserve her mysterious fragrance.

Upon her arrival at the imperial palace, the Fragrant Concubine was given a garden and a luxurious room as a sign of the Qianlong Emperor's devotion. Homesick and distraught, she remained disconsolate as the emperor made ever-increasing efforts to recreate her distant village, building her a mosque, miniature oasis and bazaar outside her windows in an effort to bring her happiness. Finally she relented and came to love him when he sent messengers to Kashgar to return with a jujube tree bearing golden fruit and the Fragrant Concubine became the emperor's cherished consort until her death. An enduring symbol of national unity and reconciliation, her body was brought back to her home of Kashgar, where she is now entombed, in a procession of 120 bearers in a journey that took over three years.

== Kashgarian legend ==
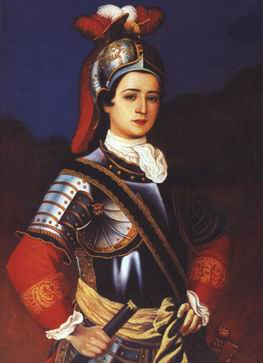
Iparhan in armour

Contemporary Kashgarian renditions of the legend are considerably less romantic. She was the daughter or consort of Khwāja Jihān, and her name was Nur Ela Nurhan. Taken away to the imperial palace in Beijing by the Qianlong Emperor, Iparhan arms herself with daggers up her sleeves, on guard against the hated advances of the emperor, until finally she is poisoned.

Khwāja Jihān with his brother Burhān ud-Dīn were the khojas during the Qing conquest of Xinjiang. Previously during the late-1600s, Dzungar Khanate conquered Yarkent Khanate, the Dzungars appointed Khojas as rulers of Kashgaria (a.k.a. Altishahr or southern Xinjiang). In the 1750s, the Khoja brothers supported Qing conquest of their Dzungar rulers in northern Xinjiang. They sought independence for Altishahr (southern Xinjiang). However, the Qing conquered them as well in the years that followed.

== Apak Khoja and Fragrant Concubine Tomb ==
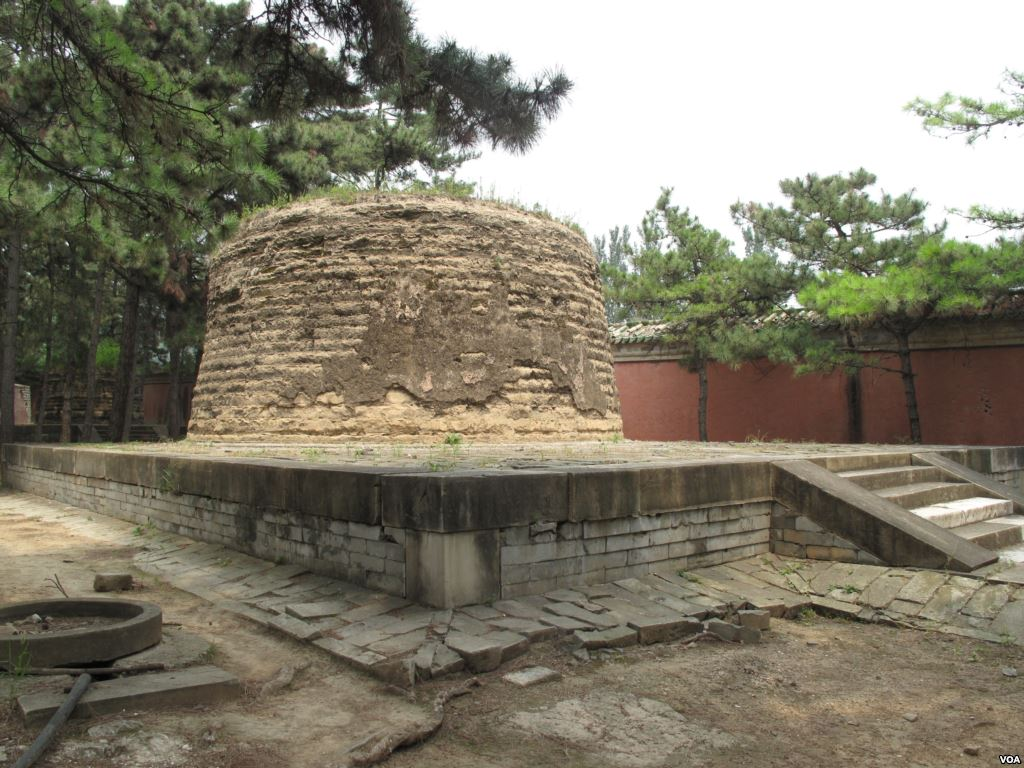
Imperial Consort Rong's tomb in the Eastern Qing tombs

The Afaq Khoja Mausoleum (mazar) located outside Kashgar was built in 1640 and, in addition to encompassing a larger complex that includes a functioning mosque and madrasa, houses the coffins of five generations of the Afak Khoja family, including what is purported to be the body of the Fragrant Concubine. In fact, the real Imperial Consort Rong died of illness on 24 May 1788 and was buried at the Eastern Qing Tombs; the legend of the Fragrant Concubine first became closely associated with the Kashgar tomb in the late 19th century, and the connection has since been officially established and endorsed through a proliferation of signs and guided tours.

== In fiction ==
=== In literature ===
- Fragrant Concubine is the title character of Nellie Yu Roung Ling's 1930 novella Hsiang Fei: A Love Story of the Emperor Ch’ien Lung.
- The character Princess Fragrance in Louis Cha's wuxia novel The Book and the Sword is loosely based on the Fragrant Concubine narrative.
- The concubine also appeared as the character Han Xiang in the television series My Fair Princess, based on the novel with the same title authored by Chiung Yao.
- The Fragrant Concubine is the title of a 2015 historical fiction novel by Melissa Addey.

=== On television ===
- Portrayed by Liu Dan in My Fair Princess (1998)
- Portrayed by Madina Memet in New My Fair Princess (2011)
- Princess Fragrant (2015)
- Portrayed by Jenny Zhang in Story of Yanxi Palace (2018)
- Portrayed by Li Qin in Ruyi's Royal Love in the Palace (2018)

=== In other media ===
- Princess Xiang Fei (香妃傳 Xiāng Fēi Zhuàn; Kō Hi Den), Op. 34, is a three-act dance work by Taiwanese composer Koh Bunya (Chiang Wen-yeh).
