= List of Tencent Video original programming =

Tencent Video is a Chinese video streaming website owned by Tencent. The website was launched in April 2011, and is one of China's largest online video platforms. As of October 2022, Tencent Video has 120 million paid subscribers, making it the 4th largest streaming service in the world, after Netflix, Amazon Prime Video, and Disney+. Tencent Video also operates an international version, WeTV, which was launched in 2018.

In April 2011, Tencent Video officially launched with an independent domain. Tencent Video supports online Video-on-Demand, television broadcasts, and in July 2017 began featuring video content on China's biggest television maker, TCL.

== Original programming ==
=== Drama ===
Title	Genre	Premiere	Seasons	Length	Status
Still a Family	Comedy drama	November 16, 2026	34 episodes	45 min	Airing
Let's Go	Comedy drama	November 2, 2026	40 episodes	35 min	Airing
Tigers Sniff the Rose	Historical political romance	October 23, 2026	40 episodes	45 min	Ended
Overseas Security Guard	Action mystery drama	October 21, 2026	32 episodes	45 min	Ended
Dream	Crime mystery thriller	October 16, 2026	18 episodes	45 min	Ended
The Vanishing Beauty	Drama	October 9, 2026	28 episodes	45 min	Ended
Thunder Chaser	Action mystery crime drama	September 29, 2026	36 episodes	45 min	Ended
A Prophet	Mystery thriller drama	September 24, 2026	24 episodes	45 min	Ended
Against the Current	Historical romance	September 11, 2026	47 episodes	45 min	Ended
The Long Watch	Mystery crime	September 6, 2026	40 episodes	45 min	Ended
See You Later... Maybe	Comedy drama	August 31, 2026	15 episodes	42 min	Ended
Remnants of Gold	Wuxia mystery	August 25, 2026	13 episodes	45 min	Ended
Cang Feng	Mystery crime	August 17, 2026	23 episodes	45 min	Ended
The Road to Splendor	Historical romance	August 9, 2026	36 episodes	45 min	Ended
Ren Yu	Thriller mystery	August 4, 2026	22 episodes	45 min	Ended
Yiran's Silver Linings	Drama	July 21, 2026	30 episodes	45 min	Ended
Overdo	Historical romance	July 19, 2026	33 episodes	45 min	Ended
Xiao Fang	Comedy drama	July 13, 2026	18 episodes	45 min	Ended
Blossoms of Power	Historical romance	July 9, 2026	36 episodes	45 min	Ended
Love Has Fireworks	Romantic comedy	June 15, 2026	36 episodes	45 min	Ended
The First Jasmine	Historical romantic fantasy	June 9, 2026	40 episodes	45 min	Ended
Wonder Wall	Comedy drama	June 7, 2026	20 episodes	45 min	Ended
The Lead	Drama	May 10, 2026	48 episodes	45 min	Ended
Lady Liberty	Romantic drama	April 28, 2026	37 episodes	45 min	Ended
Eight Hundred	Thriller crime	April 17, 2026	20 episodes	45 min	Ended
The Epoch of Miyu	Romantic drama	April 13, 2026	38 episodes	45 min	Ended
Rebirth	Action romantic drama	April 8, 2026	40 episodes	45 min	Ended
The Silent Rift	Thriller	April 1, 2026	16 episodes	45 min	Ended
Love Beyond the Grave	Wuxia romantic fantasy	March 28, 2026	40 episodes	45 min	Ended
Hold a Court Now	Thriller crime	March 25, 2026	26 episodes	45 min	Ended
Vanished Name	Thriller mystery	March 18, 2026	31 episodes	45 min	Ended
Her Blaze	Drama	March 13, 2026	30 episodes	45 min	Ended
Pursuit of Jade	Historical romance	March 6, 2026	40 episodes	45 min	Ended
About Love	Romantic drama	February 26, 2026	26 episodes	45 min	Ended
Generation to Generation	Wuxia romantic fantasy	February 22, 2026	37 episodes	45 min	Ended
Love Story in the 1970s	Romantic drama	February 21, 2026	29 episodes	45 min	Ended
Mama Go!	Comedy fantasy	February 13, 2026	24 episodes	43 min	Ended
The Hidden Truth	Thriller mystery	February 6, 2026	12 episodes	45 min	Ended
The Truth	Thriller mystery	February 3, 2026	30 episodes	45 min	Ended
No Pain No Gain	Comedy drama	January 31, 2026	26 episodes	43 min	Ended
The Glamorous Night	Drama	January 28, 2026	24 episodes	45 min	Ended
My Page in the 90s	Comedy drama romantic fantasy	January 22, 2026	24 episodes	40 min	Ended
The Dream Maker	Drama	January 10, 2026	40 episodes	45 min	Ended
Forever Young	Drama	December 30, 2025	32 episodes	43 min	Ended
Light of Dawn	Thriller mystery	December 27, 2025	18 episodes	45 min	Ended
Shine on Me	Romantic drama	December 22, 2025	36 episodes	45 min	Ended
The Company	Wuxia fantasy	December 17, 2025	30 episodes	45 min	Ended
Uncle	Comedy drama	December 15, 2025	24 episodes	45 min	Ended
Supersensory Maze	Thriller mystery	December 9, 2025	20 episodes	40 min	Ended
Sniper Butterfly	Romantic drama	December 4, 2025	30 episodes	45 min	Ended
All Rise	Drama	November 29, 2025	24 episodes	45 min	Ended
Sarcastic Family	Comedy drama	November 27, 2025	24 episodes	45 min	Ended
Love on the Turquoise Land	Thriller mystery romantic fantasy	November 22, 2025	32 episodes	45 min	Ended
Why Is He Still Single?	Romantic drama	November 16, 2025	16 episodes	45 min	Ended
Flying Up Without Disturb	Wuxia romantic fantasy	November 15, 2025	32 episodes	45 min	Ended
Those Days	Drama	November 7, 2025	30 episodes	45 min	Ended
Blemish Flaw	Psychological thriller mystery	November 5, 2025	16 episodes	45 min	Ended
The Triple Echo of Time	Coming-of-age fantasy	November 1, 2025	24 episodes	35 min	Ended
Fight for Love	Historical romance	October 30, 2025	40 episodes	45 min	Ended
Moonlit Order	Historical romance	October 28, 2025	24 episodes	30 min	Ended
Persona	Thriller mystery	October 26, 2025	12 episodes	45 min	Ended
Light Beyond the Reed	Psychological romantic drama	October 16, 2025	16 episodes	45 min	Ended
Yummy Yummy Yummy	Food and drink historical romantic fantasy	October 9, 2025	32 episodes	45 min	Ended
Love's Ambition	Romantic drama	September 26, 2025	32 episodes	45 min	Ended
The Sun in the Dark	Wuxia fantasy	September 14, 2025	24 episodes	30 min	Ended
The Journey of Legend	Wuxia fantasy	September 11, 2025	40 episodes	45 min	Ended
Twelve Letters	Thriller mystery romantic fantasy	August 29, 2025	12 episodes	45 min	Ended
The Long Way Back	Historical drama	August 25, 2025	34 episodes	45 min	Ended
Moonlit Reunion	Wuxia romantic fantasy	August 18, 2025	38 episodes	45 min	Ended
Flower Sea	Coming-of-age romantic drama	August 7, 2025	24 episodes	35 min	Ended
Legend of the Female General	Wuxia romantic drama war	August 6, 2025	36 episodes	45 min	Ended
Sword Rose	Thriller crime mystery war	July 28, 2025	33 episodes	45 min	Ended
Her	Food and drink romantic drama	July 21, 2025	24 episodes	45 min	Ended
The Narcotic Operation	Thriller crime mystery	July 12, 2025	30 episodes	30 min	Ended
Double Fugue	Romantic drama	July 9, 2025	20 episodes	30 min	Ended
Rose and Gun	Romantic drama	July 2, 2025	34 episodes	45 min	Ended
The Princess's Gambit	Historical mystery romantic thriller	June 25, 2025	36 episodes	45 min	Ended
To Get Master	Historical romantic fantasy	June 20, 2025	36 episodes	45 min	Ended
Reborn	Coming-of-age romantic thriller	June 19, 2025	23 episodes	45 min	Ended
The Litchi Road	Historical	June 7, 2025	35 episodes	45 min	Ended
Double Happiness	Romantic drama	June 5, 2025	30 episodes	45 min	Ended
Be Passionately in Love	Coming-of-age romantic drama	May 28, 2025	24 episodes	45 min	Ended
Destiny of Love	Historical romantic comedy	May 28, 2025	24 episodes	40 min	Ended
D.I.D. 12	Thriller crime mystery	May 19, 2025	25 episodes	45 min	Ended
2099	Historical romantic comedy science fiction	May 16, 2025	18 episodes	35 min	Ended
The Prisoner of Beauty	Historical political romance	May 13, 2025	36 episodes	45 min	Ended
Dear Enemy	Drama	May 7, 2025	24 episodes	45 min	Ended
Into the Heat	Mystery	May 5, 2025	24 episodes	45 min	Ended
Serendipity	Historical mystery romantic thriller	April 25, 2025	40 episodes	45 min	Ended
Endless Protection	Thriller mystery	April 24, 2025	24 episodes	45 min	Ended
Secret Files of XSA	Thriller crime mystery	April 16, 2025	16 episodes	46 min	Ended
Hanging Mirrors	Thriller crime mystery	April 15, 2025	18 episodes	45 min	Ended
Hidden Master	Wuxia comedy mystery	April 11, 2025	30 episodes	45 min	Ended
My Destined Consort	Historical romance	April 10, 2025	28 episodes	35 min	Ended
Such a Good Love	Romantic drama	April 2, 2025	26 episodes	45 min	Ended
Love Again	Drama	March 30, 2025	36 episodes	45 min	Ended
Playing Go	Thriller crime	March 25, 2025	22 episodes	45 min	Ended
The Glory	Historical drama	March 18, 2025	30 episodes	45 min	Ended
The Quirky and the Charming	Romantic comedy drama	March 15, 2025	20 episodes	40 min	Ended
My Name Is Zhao Chuxi	Thriller drama	March 13, 2025	30 episodes	45 min	Ended
Si Jin	Historical romantic fantasy	March 1, 2025	40 episodes	45 min	Ended
Love and Sword	Wuxia romantic comedy fantasy	February 26, 2025	24 episodes	45 min	Ended
Filter	Romantic comedy science fantasy	February 24, 2025	32 episodes	45 min	Ended
Always Home	Coming-of-age romantic drama	February 15, 2025	30 episodes	45 min	Ended
Les Belles	Historical mystery romantic comedy	February 13, 2025	26 episodes	45 min	Ended
The Embers	Thriller	February 8, 2025	28 episodes	45 min	Ended
Lies Never Lie	Mystery	February 5, 2025	21 episodes	35 min	Ended
Six Sisters	Drama	February 3, 2025	38 episodes	45 min	Ended
Reopen My Journals	Coming-of-age drama	January 24, 2025	33 episodes	45 min	Ended
Everlasting Longing	Historical drama mystery romance	January 20, 2025	30 episodes	45 min	Ended
Live or Love?	Romantic fantasy	January 19, 2025	24 episodes	35 min	Ended
Cao Xuanxuan's Love Journey	Historical fantasy mystery romance	January 13, 2025	21 episodes	35 min	Ended
Guardians of the Dafeng	Wuxia romantic comedy fantasy	December 28, 2024	40 episodes	45 min	Ended
Chasing the Wind	Coming-of-age romance sports	December 23, 2024	20 episodes	40 min	Ended
Genius Comes First	Coming-of-age romantic comedy	December 15, 2024	22 episodes	40 min	Ended
Blossom	Historical fantasy mystery romance	December 6, 2024	34 episodes	45 min	Ended
Black & White Forest	Action mystery thriller drama	December 4, 2024	28 episodes	40 min	Ended
Married	Romantic drama	November 28, 2024	24 episodes	45 min	Ended
42 Hao Lv She Zhi Wai Xing Lai Ke	Science fiction comedy	November 28, 2024	26 episodes	30 min	Ended
The Land of Warriors	Wuxia romantic fantasy	November 25, 2024	38 episodes	45 min	Ended
Later, I Laughed	Comedy drama	November 23, 2024	24 episodes	45 min	Ended
Almost Delicious	Romantic fantasy	November 21, 2024	24 episodes	30 min	Ended
See Her Again	Action fantasy mystery thriller drama	November 20, 2024	18 episodes	50 min	Ended
Smile Code	Coming-of-age romantic comedy	November 8, 2024	34 episodes	45 min	Ended
The Silent Storm	Thriller	November 7, 2024	16 episodes	45 min	Ended
Love Game in Eastern Fantasy	Wuxia romantic fantasy	November 1, 2024	32 episodes	45 min	Ended
Our Days	Drama	October 26, 2024	36 episodes	45 min	Ended
Dawn Amidst Hidden Clouds	Historical mystery romantic thriller	October 24, 2024	22 episodes	30 min	Ended
No Return	Historical drama war romance	October 21, 2024	25 episodes	45 min	Ended
The Rise of Ning	Historical drama romance	October 10, 2024	40 episodes	45 min	Ended
Go Back Lover	Coming-of-age romantic drama	October 8, 2024	24 episodes	45 min	Ended
Desert Whispers	Historical fantasy adventure mystery	October 6, 2024	20 episodes	45 min	Ended
Love in the Desert	Historical drama martial arts romance	September 29, 2024	26 episodes	35 min	Ended
You Are My Lover Friend	Coming-of-age romantic drama	September 23, 2024	30 episodes	45 min	Ended
Brother	Adventure sports drama	September 22, 2024	24 episodes	45 min	Ended
SWAT Girls	Romance	September 20, 2024	24 episodes	45 min	Ended
Big Biz Duel	Action drama	September 16, 2024	25 episodes	45 min	Ended
Love of Nirvana	Wuxia political romantic drama	September 14, 2024	40 episodes	45 min	Ended
She and Her Girls	Drama	September 10, 2024	23 episodes	45 min	Ended
Fateful Love	Wuxia romantic fantasy drama	August 30, 2024	40 episodes	45 min	Ended
Adventure Behind the Bronze Door	Action adventure mystery horror	August 26, 2024	32 episodes	45 min	Ended
The Whole Truth	Mystery	August 17, 2024	12 episodes	40 min	Ended
Are You the One	Historical drama romance	August 12, 2024	40 episodes	45 min	Ended
The Unexpected Marriage	Historical romantic comedy	July 31, 2024	24 episodes	35 min	Ended
Snowfall	Historical fantasy romantic thriller	July 29, 2024	24 episodes	45 min	Ended
Go! Beach Volleyball Girls	Coming-of-age romance sports	July 27, 2024	36 episodes	45 min	Ended
Another Soul in Me	Romantic comedy fantasy	July 19, 2024	24 episodes	35 min	Ended
As Beautiful as You	Romantic comedy	July 2, 2024	40 episodes	45 min	Ended
Treasures Around	Historical romance	June 28, 2024	24 episodes	40 min	Ended
Limited 72 Hours of Love	Romantic fantasy	June 25, 2024	24 episodes	30 min	Ended
No Room for Crime	Action mystery romantic drama	June 24, 2024	25 episodes	45 min	Ended
The Legend of Heroes	Wuxia	June 17, 2024	30 episodes	45 min	Season 2 due to premiere
Jade's Fateful Love	Adventure historical fantasy romance	June 15, 2024	24 episodes	40 min	Ended
The Tale of Rose	Romance	June 8, 2024	38 episodes	45 min	Ended
Heroes	Action adventure historical mystery	May 8, 2024	36 episodes	45 min	Ended
What If	Romantic drama	May 6, 2024	20 episodes	45 min	Ended
Men in Love	Romantic drama	May 3, 2024	40 episodes	45 min	Ended
Young Babylon	Coming-of-age adventure romance	April 29, 2024	26 episodes	36–59 min	Ended
Lady Revenger Returns from the Fire	Historical action romantic thriller	April 26, 2024	24 episodes	45 min	Ended
Will Love in Spring	Romantic drama	April 22, 2024	21 episodes	40 min	Ended
Best Choice Ever	Romantic drama	April 9, 2024	37 episodes	45 min	Ended
Sword and Fairy	Xianxia romantic fantasy	April 2, 2024	40 episodes	45 min	Ended
Fry Me to the Moon	Food and drink romantic drama	March 29, 2024	24 episodes	45 min	Ended
The Legend of Shen Li	Wuxia romantic fantasy	March 18, 2024	39 episodes	45 min	Ended
Simple Days	Drama	March 14, 2024	26 episodes	45 min	Ended
Angels Fall Sometimes	Romance melodrama	March 9, 2024	24 episodes	45 min	Ended
Yong An Dream	Historical fantasy mystery romance	February 28, 2024	24 episodes	45 min	Ended
The Hunter	Action mystery crime	February 21, 2024	18 episodes	35 min	Ended
Island	Romantic drama	February 13, 2024	40 episodes	40 min	Ended
Amidst a Snowstorm of Love	Romantic sports	February 2, 2024	30 episodes	45 min	Ended
The Happy Seven in Chang'an	Historical comedy	January 30, 2024	24 episodes	45 min	Ended
Sweet Trap	Food and drink romantic comedy drama	January 29, 2024	24 episodes	40 min	Ended
Sword and Fairy	Wuxia romantic fantasy	January 18, 2024	36 episodes	45 min	Ended
Frozen Surface	Mystery thriller	January 10, 2024	12 episodes	55 min	Ended
Blossoms Shanghai	Historical drama romance	December 27, 2023	30 episodes	45 min	Ended
I Know I Love You	Romantic drama	December 25, 2023	24 episodes	45 min	Ended
The Last Immortal	Wuxia romantic fantasy	December 11, 2023	40 episodes	45 min	Ended
Battle through the Heaven	Wuxia romantic fantasy	December 8, 2023	34 episodes	45 min	Ended
Got a Crush on You	Romantic comedy drama	December 7, 2023	26 episodes	45 min	Ended
Love Me, Love My Voice	Musical romantic drama	November 30, 2023	33 episodes	45 min	Ended
South Sea Tomb	Action adventure thriller	November 27, 2023	16 episodes	35 min	Ended
Chase the Truth	Action mystery thriller crime	November 16, 2023	24 episodes	35 min	Ended
Solemn Commitment	Drama	November 13, 2023	32 episodes	45 min	Ended
Wonderland of Love	Historical drama political romance	November 6, 2023	40 episodes	45 min	Ended
There Will Be Ample Time	Romantic drama	November 3, 2023	36 episodes	45 min	Ended
The Furthest Distance	Romance	October 26, 2023	30 episodes	45 min	Ended
Blooming Days	Historical romance melodrama	October 23, 2023	36 episodes	45 min	Ended
Ripe Town	Historical mystery	October 13, 2023	12 episodes	60 min	Ended
Mr. & Mrs. Chen	Action historical crime romance	October 11, 2023	32 episodes	45 min	Ended
The Heart	Drama	October 7, 2023	2 seasons, 78 episodes	45 min	Ended
Hilarious Family	Historical romantic comedy	September 22, 2023	2 seasons, 52 episodes	45 min	Ended
Alliance	Romantic drama	September 19, 2023	36 episodes	45 min	Ended
Faithful	Historical mystery thriller	September 15, 2023	25 episodes	45 min	Ended
Parallel World	Romantic thriller fantasy drama	September 7, 2023	38 episodes	35 min	Ended
The Eve	Historical thriller crime war	August 29, 2023	32 episodes	45 min	Ended
A Long Way Home	Drama	August 27, 2023	30 episodes	45 min	Ended
The Legend of Zhuohua	Historical drama mystery romantic	August 19, 2023	40 episodes	45 min	Ended
Legend of the Undercover Chef	Wuxia comedy	August 18, 2023	2 seasons, 80 episodes	25 min	Ended
Sweet Games	Romantic drama	August 11, 2023	24 episodes	45 min	Ended
The Infiltrator	Historical drama crime	July 27, 2023	37 episodes	45 min	Ended
Lost You Forever	Wuxia romantic fantasy	July 24, 2023	2 seasons, 62 episodes	45 min	Ended
Who's Your Daddy?	Coming-of-age comedy	July 21, 2023	24 episodes	45 min	Ended
Fearless Blood	Historical drama	July 15, 2023	18 episodes	45 min	Ended
The Longest Promise	Wuxia romantic fantasy political	July 2, 2023	40 episodes	45 min	Ended
Twilight	Romantic mystery	June 29, 2023	40 episodes	45 min	Ended
Snow Eagle Lord	Wuxia romantic fantasy drama	June 21, 2023	40 episodes	50 min	Ended
Stand or Fall	Romantic drama	June 18, 2023	2 seasons, 62 episodes	45 min	Season 2 due to premiere
A Date with the Future	Romantic drama	June 2, 2023	36 episodes	45 min	Ended
The Youth Memories	Coming-of-age romantic drama	June 1, 2023	38 episodes	45 min	Ended
Prosecution Elite	Mystery law drama	May 29, 2023	40 episodes	45 min	Ended
My Wife	Romantic drama	May 24, 2023	24 episodes	40 min	Ended
The Road to Ordinary	Law drama	May 3, 2023	36 episodes	45 min	Ended
The Love You Give Me	Romantic comedy drama	April 24, 2023	28 episodes	45 min	Ended
The Long Season	Mystery thriller	April 22, 2023	12 episodes	60 min	Ended
Start Here	Drama	April 12, 2023	33 episodes	45 min	Ended
Infernal Affairs	Action historical crime war	March 30, 2023	40 episodes	45 min	Ended
Nothing but You	Romantic drama sports	March 27, 2023	38 episodes	45 min	Ended
Romance of a Twin Flower	Historical drama romance	March 21, 2023	38 episodes	45 min	Ended
Royal Rumours	Historical drama romantic comedy	March 15, 2023	24 episodes	45 min	Ended
The Journey of Chong Zi	Wuxia romantic fantasy	February 15, 2023	40 episodes	45 min	Ended
The Forbidden Flower	Romance melodrama	February 13, 2023	24 episodes	35 min	Ended
A League of Nobleman	Historical drama mystery thriller	January 30, 2023	29 episodes	30 min	Ended
Three-Body	Science fiction mystery thriller	January 15, 2023	30 episodes	45 min	Ended
Choice Husband	Historical romantic comedy	January 11, 2023	30 episodes	45 min	Ended
Insect Totem	Historical science fiction mystery thriller	January 6, 2023	39 episodes	45 min	Ended
Time and Him Are Just Right	Coming-of-age romance	December 25, 2022	25 episodes	40 min	Ended
Accidentally Meow on You	Romantic comedy drama	December 20, 2022	24 episodes	45 min	Ended
Forensic JD	Drama mystery thriller	December 12, 2022	12 episodes	45 min	Ended
Women Walk the Line	Romantic drama	November 25, 2022	36 episodes	45 min	Ended
She and Her Perfect Husband	Romantic law	November 14, 2022	40 episodes	45 min	Ended
Game of Wisdom	Drama	November 5, 2022	40 episodes	45 min	Ended
Winter Night	Psychological romantic fantasy	October 31, 2022	24 episodes	45 min	Ended
Almost Lover	Romance	October 26, 2022	36 episodes	45 min	Ended
Light Chaser Rescue	Action romantic thriller drama	October 14, 2022	40 episodes	45 min	Ended
Cute Bodyguard	Romantic comedy	October 14, 2022	24 episodes	45 min	Ended
My Deepest Dream	Romantic thriller science fantasy	October 1, 2022	30 episodes	45 min	Ended
My Calorie Boy	Coming-of-age romantic comedy	September 26, 2022	30 episodes	46 min	Ended
Kunlun Tomb	Action adventure mystery thriller	September 20, 2022	16 episodes	45 min	Ended
Side Story of Fox Volant	Wuxia drama	August 31, 2022	40 episodes	40 min	Ended
Discovery of Romance	Romantic comedy drama	August 28, 2022	26 episodes	45 min	Ended
Rose War	Drama	August 8, 2022	40 episodes	45 min	Ended
Aim the Heart! Archeress	Coming-of-age romance sports	August 2, 2022	18 episodes	40 min	Ended
Lost in the Kunlun Mountains	Historical fantasy mystery romance	July 27, 2022	36 episodes	45 min	Ended
Farewell Vivian	Romance melodrama	July 25, 2022	24 episodes	45 min	Ended
Love Like the Galaxy	Historical mystery political romance	July 5, 2022	2 seasons, 56 episodes	45 min	Ended
Babel	Drama mystery thriller	June 22, 2022	30 episodes	45 min	Ended
Hello My Shining Love	Romantic comedy drama	June 15, 2022	43 episodes	45 min	Ended
The Stories of Lion Rock Spirit	Historical drama	June 12, 2022	27 episodes	45 min	Ended
Nice to Meet You Again	Romance	June 7, 2022	40 episodes	45 min	Ended
Mom Wow	Drama	June 5, 2022	40 episodes	45 min	Ended
A Dream of Splendor	Historical romance	June 2, 2022	40 episodes	45 min	Ended
Binary Love	Coming-of-age romantic comedy drama	May 27, 2022	24 episodes	45 min	Ended
Heroes	Wuxia drama	May 23, 2022	38 episodes	50 min	Ended
Lady of Law	Romantic law drama	May 9, 2022	40 episodes	45 min	Ended
When You Be Me	Coming-of-age romance	May 5, 2022	26 episodes	40 min	Ended
Who Rules the World	Wuxia romantic fantasy	April 18, 2022	40 episodes	45 min	Ended
The Bachelors	Romantic drama	March 27, 2022	40 episodes	45 min	Ended
Farewell to Arms	Action historical war	March 24, 2022	39 episodes	45 min	Ended
The Oath of Love	Coming-of-age romantic drama	March 15, 2022	32 episodes	45 min	Ended
Legally Romance	Romantic comedy fantasy law	March 10, 2022	33 episodes	45 min	Ended
Modern Marriage	Romance	February 23, 2022	38 episodes	45 min	Ended
The Autumn Ballad	Historical drama mystery romance	February 5, 2022	34 episodes	45 min	Ended
Hello, the Sharpshooter	Coming-of-age romantic comedy sports	February 2, 2022	40 episodes	45 min	Ended
City of Streamer	Historical romantic thriller crime	January 20, 2022	40 episodes	45 min	Ended
Operation: Special Warfare	Action military romantic drama	January 18, 2022	35 episodes	45 min	Ended
Mirror: A Tale of Twin Cities	Wuxia romantic fantasy	January 16, 2022	43 episodes	45 min	Ended
Sword Snow Stride	Wuxia drama fantasy	December 15, 2021	38 episodes	45 min	Ended
I Am the Years You Are the Stars	Mystery romantic science fantasy	December 9, 2021	24 episodes	40 min	Ended
Ebola Fighters	Military drama	December 8, 2021	24 episodes	45 min	Ended
Lie to Love	Romantic comedy drama	November 30, 2021	32 episodes	45 min	Ended
Delicious Romance	Romantic drama	November 26, 2021	20 episodes	35 min	Ended
Novoland: Pearl Eclipse	Wuxia romantic fantasy	November 10, 2021	48 episodes	51 min	Ended
Rebirth for You	Historical political romance	October 17, 2021	40 episodes	55 min	Ended
Shining Like You	Coming-of-age romance	October 11, 2021	24 episodes	40 min	Ended
Once We Get Married	Romantic comedy drama	October 8, 2021	24 episodes	40 min	Ended
A Female Student Arrives at the Imperial College	Historical mystery romantic comedy	September 22, 2021	30 episodes	45 min	Ended
Our Times	Coming-of-age drama	September 14, 2021	36 episodes	45 min	Ended
Cute Programmer	Romantic comedy drama	September 10, 2021	30 episodes	45 min	Ended
Double Tap	Mystery thriller	September 9, 2021	16 episodes	45 min	Ended
Candle in the Tomb: The Worm Valley	Action adventure mystery political	August 30, 2021	16 episodes	45 min	Ended
Demi-Gods and Semi-Devils	Wuxia romantic comedy	August 14, 2021	50 episodes	45 min	Ended
Crime Crackdown	Action mystery horror	August 9, 2021	28 episodes	45 min	Ended
You Are My Glory	Romantic comedy drama	July 26, 2021	32 episodes	35 min	Ended
My Queen	Wuxia romantic comedy fantasy	July 23, 2021	24 episodes	45 min	Ended
My Deskmate	Coming-of-age romantic comedy	July 14, 2021	30 episodes	45 min	Ended
Lover or Stranger	Mystery thriller melodrama	July 12, 2021	29 episodes	35 min	Ended
Reset in July	Coming-of-age drama	June 21, 2021	25 episodes	45 min	Ended
Ancient Love Poetry	Wuxia romantic fantasy	June 17, 2021	49 episodes	45 min	Ended
Stray Birds	Coming-of-age romantic drama	June 3, 2021	40 episodes	45 min	Ended
Flourish in Time	Coming-of-age romantic drama	May 28, 2021	24 episodes	45 min	Ended
Time Flies and You Are Here	Coming-of-age historical romance	May 20, 2021	32 episodes	45 min	Ended
Young and Beautiful	Romantic drama	May 14, 2021	42 episodes	45 min	Ended
Miss the Dragon	Wuxia romantic fantasy	May 10, 2021	36 episodes	34 min	Ended
The Imperial Coroner	Historical mystery romance	April 29, 2021	2 seasons, 64 episodes	39 min	Ended
Miss Crow and Mr. Lizard	Romantic comedy fantasy	April 26, 2021	36 episodes	45 min	Ended
Please Classmate	Coming-of-age romantic comedy	April 23, 2021	24 episodes	45 min	Ended
Love Scenery	Romantic comedy musical	April 8, 2021	31 episodes	45 min	Ended
The Long Ballad	Action historical romance war	March 31, 2021	49 episodes	45 min	Ended
Hello Mr. Gu	Romantic comedy drama	March 30, 2021	30 episodes	35 min	Ended
Brilliant Girls	Romantic drama	March 2, 2021	43 episodes	45 min	Ended
The Sword and the Brocade	Historical mystery romance	February 26, 2021	45 episodes	45 min	Ended
Douluo Continent	Wuxia romantic fantasy	February 5, 2021	40 episodes	40 min	Ended
The Blessed Girl	Adventure historical fantasy	January 29, 2021	40 episodes	45 min	Ended
Unrequited Love	Coming-of-age romantic drama	January 20, 2021	38 episodes	45 min	Ended
A Girl Like Me	Wuxia romantic comedy	January 18, 2021	40 episodes	45 min	Ended
My Little Happiness	Romantic comedy drama	January 13, 2021	28 episodes	45 min	Ended
The Most Beautiful You in the World	Coming-of-age romantic comedy drama	January 12, 2021	24 episodes	30 min	Ended
Unsolved Cases of Kung Fu: Portrait of Beauty	Wuxia mystery	December 30, 2020	24 episodes	30 min	Ended
The Message	Military historical psychological thriller	December 24, 2020	38 episodes	45 min	Ended
A Love So Romantic	Historical romantic comedy	December 24, 2020	32 episodes	35 min	Ended
Legend of Fei	Wuxia romantic mystery war	December 16, 2020	51 episodes	45 min	Ended
Forever Love	Romantic comedy drama	December 14, 2020	28 episodes	45 min	Ended
Dream Detective	Historical mystery thriller	December 8, 2020	24 episodes	45 min	Ended
You Complete Me	Romantic drama	December 2, 2020	40 episodes	45 min	Ended
Qin Dynasty Epic	Historical political	December 1, 2020	78 episodes	45 min	Ended
New Face	Romantic thriller mystery	November 24, 2020	25 episodes	45 min	Ended
Twisted Fate of Love	Historical drama romantic fantasy	November 23, 2020	43 episodes	45 min	Ended
Be with You	Romantic comedy drama	November 19, 2020	24 episodes	40 min	Ended
The Legend of Xiao Chuo	Action historical romance political	November 3, 2020	48 episodes	45 min	Ended
Jiu Liu Overlord	Historical mystery romance	October 23, 2020	36 episodes	45 min	Ended
Sweet First Love	Coming-of-age romantic comedy	October 8, 2020	24 episodes	45 min	Ended
Legend of Two Sisters in the Chaos	Historical political martial arts romance	September 28, 2020	40 episodes	45 min	Ended
Miss Gu Who Is Silent	Psychological thriller mystery	September 23, 2020	20 episodes	45 min	Ended
Dating in the Kitchen	Food and drink romantic comedy	September 15, 2020	24 episodes	45 min	Ended
The Promise of Chang'an	Historical drama political romance	September 10, 2020	56 episodes	45 min	Ended
Conspiracy	Mystery thriller crime	September 7, 2020	24 episodes	45 min	Ended
Way Back into Love	Romantic comedy	September 4, 2020	26 episodes	45 min	Ended
Miss S	Historical mystery romance	August 28, 2020	34 episodes	45 min	Ended
Midsummer Is Full of Love	Drama romantic comedy	August 28, 2020	24 episodes	45 min	Ended
Maiden Holmes	Historical mystery romantic comedy	August 27, 2020	32 episodes	45 min	Ended
A Murderous Affair in Horizon Tower	Drama mystery thriller	August 19, 2020	16 episodes	40 min	Ended
The Heiress	Historical romantic comedy political	August 13, 2020	24 episodes	45 min	Ended
Dance of the Phoenix	Wuxia romantic comedy fantasy	August 10, 2020	30 episodes	45 min	Ended
Cross Fire	Coming-of-age action science fiction sports	July 20, 2020	36 episodes	45 min	Ended
Nothing But Thirty	Romantic drama	July 17, 2020	43 episodes	45 min	Season 2 due to premiere
White War	Action thriller mystery crime	July 9, 2020	30 episodes	45 min	Ended
Mr Honesty	Romantic comedy	June 29, 2020	31 episodes	45 min	Ended
Parallel Love	Romantic comedy fantasy	June 18, 2020	24 episodes	45 min	Ended
The Legend of Jin Yan	Wuxia romantic mystery	June 17, 2020	34 episodes	35 min	Ended
Trace	Romantic mystery	June 15, 2020	36 episodes	45 min	Ended
Love in Between	Wuxia romantic mystery political	June 8, 2020	43 episodes	45 min	Ended
You Are My Destiny	Romantic comedy drama	June 5, 2020	36 episodes	45 min	Ended
Mr. Fox and Miss Rose	Action romantic comedy	May 28, 2020	30 episodes	45 min	Ended
The Romance of Tiger and Rose	Historical romantic comedy fantasy	May 18, 2020	2 seasons, 24 episodes	45 min	Ended
My Love, Enlighten Me	Romantic comedy	May 13, 2020	24 episodes	45 min	Ended
The Chang'an Youth	Coming-of-age historical mystery romance	April 20, 2020	24 episodes	45 min	Ended
The Love Equations	Coming-of-age romantic drama	April 10, 2020	27 episodes	45 min	Ended
Serenade of Peaceful Joy	Historical drama political romantic	April 7, 2020	69 episodes	45 min	Ended
Candle in the Tomb: The Lost Caverns	Action adventure mystery	April 1, 2020	18 episodes	45 min	Ended
As Long as You Love Me	Romantic drama	March 30, 2020	46 episodes	45 min	Ended
Imperfect Love	Drama thriller	March 27, 2020	22 episodes	40 min	Ended
Forget You Remember Love	Romantic comedy drama	March 23, 2020	38 episodes	45 min	Ended
Eternal Love of Dream	Wuxia romantic fantasy	January 22, 2020	56 episodes	45 min	Ended
Fairyland Lovers	Romantic comedy	January 6, 2020	35 episodes	45 min	Ended
The Boundary	Action mystery thriller crime	December 26, 2019	24 episodes	40 min	Ended
Dreaming Back to the Qing Dynasty	Historical drama romance	December 14, 2019	40 episodes	45 min	Ended
To Get Her	Historical romantic comedy fantasy	December 7, 2019	30 episodes	30 min	Ended
You Are My Miracle	Action mystery romance	December 2, 2019	23 episodes	35 min	Ended
Joy of Life	Wuxia romantic fantasy	November 26, 2019	2 seasons, 82 episodes	45 min	Season 3 due to premiere
The Code of Siam	Comedy thriller mystery	November 13, 2019	24 episodes	45 min	Ended
The Life of the White Fox	Historical romantic comedy fantasy	November 4, 2019	24 episodes	45 min	Ended
Unknown Number	Science fiction mystery thriller	October 23, 2019	32 episodes	45 min	Ended
No Secrets	Thriller romantic drama	October 17, 2019	32 episodes	45 min	Ended
The Gravity of a Rainbow	Romantic drama	October 16, 2019	40 episodes	45 min	Ended
The Love by Hypnotic	Historical drama romantic comedy	October 14, 2019	36 episodes	45 min	Ended
All I Want for Love Is You	Romantic comedy drama	October 10, 2019	32 episodes	40 min	Ended
Police College Whirlwind	Mystery crime	October 8, 2019	30 episodes	45 min	Ended
Soft Memory	Coming-of-age musical romance	October 7, 2019	20 episodes	35 min	Ended
Lookism	Mystery thriller romance	September 26, 2019	38 episodes	30 min	Ended
Project 17: Skate Our Souls	Coming-of-age melodrama sports	September 10, 2019	12 episodes	35 min	Ended
Nine Kilometers of Love	Coming-of-age romantic comedy	August 29, 2019	24 episodes	40 min	Ended
Walk Into Your Memory	Romantic comedy	August 21, 2019	24 episodes	45 min	Ended
My Girlfriend Is an Alien	Romantic comedy fantasy	August 19, 2019	2 seasons, 58 episodes	45 min	Ended
The King's Avatar	Coming-of-age action sports	July 24, 2019	40 episodes	45 min	Season 2 due to premiere
The Untamed	Wuxia mystery fantasy	June 27, 2019	50 episodes	45 min	Ended
Deep in My Heart	Mystery thriller romance	June 19, 2019	28 episodes	30 min	Ended
Unrequited Love	Coming-of-age romance	June 10, 2019	24 episodes	35 min	Ended
The Lost Tomb 2	Action adventure mystery	June 6, 2019	2 seasons, 64 episodes	45 min	Ended
Your Highness, the Class Monitor	Coming-of-age romance	May 30, 2019	36 episodes	45 min	Ended
Legend of the Phoenix	Historical romance	May 28, 2019	41 episodes	45 min	Ended
Le Coup de Foudre	Coming-of-age romantic drama	April 29, 2019	35 episodes	45 min	Ended
Detective L	Historical mystery thriller	April 18, 2019	24 episodes	40 min	Ended
Put Your Head on My Shoulder	Coming-of-age romantic comedy	April 10, 2019	24 episodes	45 min	Ended
The Brightest Star in the Sky	Romantic comedy musical	March 25, 2019	44 episodes	45 min	Ended
Cold Case	Action crime mystery thriller	March 4, 2019	30 episodes	45 min	Ended
Heavenly Sword and Dragon Slaying Sabre	Wuxia romantic fantasy	February 27, 2019	50 episodes	45 min	Ended
Grand Theft in Tang	Action comedy historical fantasy	February 20, 2019	24 episodes	45 min	Ended
Just an Encore	Coming-of-age romance	January 30, 2019	31 episodes	35 min	Ended
Candle in the Tomb: The Wrath of Time	Adventure historical mystery	January 21, 2019	21 episodes	45 min	Ended
Shall We Fall in Love	Romantic comedy drama	December 27, 2018	35 episodes	45 min	Ended
Flipped	Romantic comedy mystery	December 24, 2018	24 episodes	30 min	Ended
Mystery of Antiques	Historical romantic comedy fantasy	December 26, 2018	3 seasons, 116 episodes	45 min	Ended
About is Love	Romantic drama	December 3, 2018	2 seasons, 54 episodes	45 min	Ended
My Disciple Died Once Again	Wuxia romantic comedy fantasy	November 19, 2018	24 episodes	45 min	Ended
When We Were Young	Coming-of-age drama	November 22, 2018	24 episodes	45 min	Ended
Ever Night	Wuxia romantic fantasy	October 31, 2018	2 seasons, 103 episodes	45 min	Ended
Starlight	Romantic drama	September 19, 2018	20 episodes	45 min	Ended
Fights Break Sphere	Wuxia romantic fantasy	September 3, 2018	45 episodes	45 min	Ended
Prince Coffee Lab	Food and drink romantic comedy	August 29, 2018	38 episodes	45 min	Ended
The Dark Lord	Wuxia romantic comedy	August 14, 2018	48 episodes	45 min	Season 2 due to premiere
Medical Examiner Dr. Qin: The Survivor	Drama mystery	August 9, 2018	30 episodes	50 min	Ended
24 Hours	Adventure fantasy comedy	July 25, 2018	12 episodes	35 min	Ended
Tomb of the Sea	Action adventure mystery	July 20, 2018	52 episodes	45 min	Ended
Cover the Sky	Wuxia romantic fantasy	July 2, 2018	32 episodes	35 min	Ended
Caught in the Heartbeat	Science fiction mystery thriller	July 2, 2018	40 episodes	45 min	Ended
Take My Brother Away	Coming-of-age comedy	June 28, 2018	30 episodes	45 min	Ended
Unexpected	Comedy drama romantic fantasy	June 13, 2018	23 episodes	35 min	Ended
My Love from the Ocean	Mystery romantic fantasy	June 12, 2018	28 episodes	45 min	Ended
Talking Bones	Mystery thriller	May 29, 2018	2 seasons, 66 episodes	35 min	Ended
The Trading Floor	Drama thriller	May 24, 2018	5 episodes	60 min	Ended
Moonshine and Valentine	Romantic fantasy drama	May 9, 2018	25 episodes	45 min	Ended
Cinderella Chef	Historical food and drink romantic comedy	April 23, 2018	56 episodes	40 min	Ended
Suddenly This Summer	Coming-of-age romance	April 19, 2018	30 episodes	40 min	Ended
Fantastic Girlfriend	Romantic drama	January 22, 2018	20 episodes	45 min	Ended
Love Is in the Air	Romantic comedy fantasy	January 18, 2018	24 episodes	45 min	Ended
Pretty Man	Romantic drama	January 15, 2018	2 seasons, 54 episodes	35 min	Ended
Faithful to Buddha, Faithful to You	Mystery romantic comedy	December 20, 2017	20 episodes	45 min	Ended
A Seven-Faced Man	Mystery romantic comedy	December 13, 2017	38 episodes	45 min	Ended
Butterfly Lovers	Mystery romantic comedy	December 9, 2017	29 episodes	36 min	Ended
A Love So Beautiful	Coming-of-age romantic comedy	November 9, 2017	23 episodes	45 min	Ended
Rule the World	Historical political romance	October 30, 2017	45 episodes	45 min	Ended
Kai Feng Qi Tan	Historical comedy law	October 30, 2017	25 episodes	45 min	Ended
The Big Boss	Coming-of-age comedy	September 8, 2017	2 seasons, 36 episodes	36 min	Ended
The Weasel Grave	Action adventure mystery fantasy	July 21, 2017	20 episodes	35 min	Ended
The Eternal Love	Historical romantic comedy fantasy	July 10, 2017	3 seasons, 84 episodes	36 min	Ended
Stairway to Stardom	Romantic comedy	June 9, 2017	50 episodes	45 min	Ended
Psychologist	Psychological romance	April 24, 2017	18 episodes	30 min	Ended
The Fox's Summer	Romantic comedy	April 5, 2017	2 seasons, 44 episodes	45 min	Ended
Solaso Bistro	Drama	March 23, 2017	20 episodes	45 min	Ended
Candle in the Tomb	Action adventure thriller	December 19, 2016	21 episodes	35 min	Ended
Simple Man	Science fiction thriller	November 9, 2016	17 episodes	35 min	Ended
When a Snail Falls in Love	Mystery thriller	October 24, 2016	21 episodes	30 min	Ended
Super Star Academy	Action romantic comedy	September 29, 2016	30 episodes	22 min	Ended
Novoland: The Castle in the Sky	Wuxia romantic fantasy	July 20, 2016	2 seasons, 62 episodes	35 min	Ended
Revive	Drama mystery	March 24, 2016	16 episodes	50 min	Ended
Death Notify: The Darker	Action mystery thriller	June 10, 2014	3 seasons, 119 episodes	40 min	Ended

=== Kids & family ===
Title	Genre	Premiere	Seasons	Length	Status
Amusing Club of Wanchun	Comedy family sitcom	April 18, 2024	40 episodes	30 min	Ended
Mi Xiao Quan Shang Xue Ji	Comedy family sitcom	December 31, 2022	3 seasons, 77 episodes	30 min	Ended

=== Variety ===
Title	Genre	Premiere	Season	Length	Status
50km Taohuawu	Variety show	May 22, 2021	1 season	1 hour 25 min	Ended
An Exciting Offer	Variety show	October 30, 2019	3 seasons	2 hour	Ended
Rave Now	Music competition	December 1, 2018	1 season	1 hour 40 min	Ended
PRODUCE 101 CHINA	Music competition	April 21, 2018	4 seasons	2 hour	Ended
On the Road	Touring documentary	April 29, 2017	2 seasons	20 min	Ended
Hello People Born After 00s!	Musical show	November 27, 2015	10 episodes	10 minutes	Ended
Amazing East	Documentary	November 27, 2015	10 episodes	10 minutes	Ended
Running Mei	Variety show	July 28, 2015	6 episodes	1 hour 10 minutes	Ended
With You Along the Way	Variety show	January 10, 2015	2 seasons, 24 episodes	1 hour 10 minutes	Ended
Are You Normal?	Talk show	April 10, 2014	3 seasons, 30 episodes	1 hour 30 minutes	Ended
