= Chen Zhuoxuan =

Chinese singer & actress (born 1997)

- 陈卓璇
- Born: August 13, 1997 (age 29); Guiyang, Guizhou, China
- Other name: Krystal
- Education: Shanghai Maritime University
- Occupations: Singer; actress
- Years active: 2016–present
- Agents: NSMG; TH Entertainment; Xier Gongting Music; HL ENTERTAINMENT
- Musical career
- Genres: Mandopop; C-pop
- Instruments: Vocals; Piano; Guitar
- Label: Tencent Music
- Formerly of: BonBon Girls 303; Super Girls Group

Chinese name
- Traditional Chinese: 陳卓璇
- Simplified Chinese: 陈卓璇
Transcriptions

Chen Zhuoxuan (Chinese: 陈卓璇; pinyin: Chén Zhuóxuán; born 13 August 1997; also known by her English name Krystal Chan) is a Chinese actress and singer. She first appeared in the 2016 audition show Super Girl 2016, where she was awarded first in the Xi'an region and joined the Super Girls Group, subsequently finishing 15th nationally. Super Girl Group disbanded in 2017, and in the same year she played her first character, You You (幽幽) in the web-drama 《云客江湖》and participated in Sound of My Dream season 2. Chen gained more popularity in 2019, as the minor character Ah Qing in The Untamed. In 2020, she participated in the survival show Produce Camp 2020, finishing fourth and debuting as the main vocalist of the girl group BonBon Girls 303. From then on, she has participated in various other shows both by herself and as a member of BonBon Girls 303. Her fandom name is Xuanfeng (璇风).

== Early life ==
Chen Zhuoxuan was born in Guiyang, Guizhou, China, and studied and graduated from Shanghai Maritime University as an English language major. Her highest level of certification is the test for English majors grade eight of China's College English Test, of which she passed. She was the class president of English class 156, and as a freshman gave a speech at the school opening ceremony in 2015. She also was the champion of the school's 28th freshman singing competition, and won many prizes in her university days, including most popular in the freshman hosting competition.

== Discography ==
=== Studio Album ===
List of extended plays, showing year released, songs, selected chart positions, and name of the album
Year	Title	Songs	Peak (TME Uni Chart)		Notes	Ref.
Year	Title	Songs	CHN	Score	Notes	Ref.
2026	Tense 當·拾	Soar 痕	-	-		
2026	Tense 當·拾	Trace Tracks 摺紙	-	-		
2026	Tense 當·拾	"Lonely Island" 無人島	67	86.08		
2026	Tense 當·拾	"Heart Flutter in the Rain" 雨悸	80	84.49		
2026	Tense 當·拾	Lion & Scorpion 博弈	-	-		
2026	Tense 當·拾	No Games 明牌	97	84.67		
2026	Tense 當·拾	Windless Belt 無風帶	37	90.15	with 艾热AIR	
2026	Tense 當·拾	Rancor 想	23	91.69	Title Track	
2026	Tense 當·拾	Enough? 你痛快了嗎	-	-		
2026	Tense 當·拾	Just That 而已	79	85.21		
2026	Tense 當·拾	My Given Name 我的名字	-	-		

=== Extended plays ===
List of extended plays, showing year released, songs, selected chart positions, and name of the album
Year	Title	Songs	Peak (TME Uni Chart)		Notes	Ref.
Year	Title	Songs	CHN	Score	Notes	Ref.
2023	Be Endless 不降落飞行指南	"Endless Feathers" 无尽之羽	-	-		
2023	Be Endless 不降落飞行指南	"Skylight" 天窗	12	94.57	Title track	
2023	Be Endless 不降落飞行指南	"Flying Talent" 飞行天分	52	87.06		
2024	Into the Light 转身走向你	Covered in Rain 转身走向你	87	83.93	Pre-release track	
2024	Into the Light 转身走向你	The Ripple 想哭就笑	20	93.66	Title track	
2024	Into the Light 转身走向你	A Pause in my Blue 请你	35	90.33		
2024	Into the Light 转身走向你	"How Could I be Unhappy" 怎么会不幸福	-	-		
2024	Into the Light 转身走向你	"Me and Me" 我和我	-	-		
2025	Mareasía 深海之息	Intro:C	-	-	Intro Track	
2025	Mareasía 深海之息	Mareasía 深海之息	41	90.79		
2025	Mareasía 深海之息	"Turn the Page" 翻篇	9	95.07	Title track	
2025	Mareasía 深海之息	"Sponge" 海绵	52	90.10		
2025	Mareasía 深海之息	"Give Your All" 拼尽	82	80.18		

=== Singles ===
List of singles, showing year released, selected chart positions, and name of the album
Year	Title	Peak (TME Uni Chart)		Notes	Ref.
Year	Title	CHN	Score	Notes	Ref.
2021	"Primrose" 櫻花草	74	64.03	Covers	
2021	"Everything's gone" 流沙	44	72.81	Covers	
2022	"Twenty" 二十	17	90.89	TME "Coming of Age" Graduation Special Project	
2022	"Late summer is not over" 夏末未了	17	90.08		
2023	"Counting Winters" 数寒	89	76.09		
2023	"Here for you" 为你而来	95	73.51	Charity Project with Asia-Pacific Communication Center of China International Publishing Group for the protection of Amji's salamander	
2023	"Want to be a kid for one more day" 多想做一天小朋友	43	86.77	Special Song for Mother's Day	
2023	"The summer I miss" 我怀念的那个夏天	90	79.59		
2023	"Trees in the mountains" 山有木兮	-	-		
2023	"Echo" 回声	-	-	Charity song	
2023	"Picking up Light" 拾光	99	78.72	Charity song	
2024	"Winter is long" 冬日很长	96	78.80		
2024	"Awakening the Blue" 唤醒蔚蓝	-	-	Charity Project with Xinhua News Agency for World Oceans Day	
2024	Hot Air 热风	N/A	N/A	Cultural and Tourism Promotional Song of Donghu District, Nanchang; NetEase Cloud Music Exclusive	
2024	Sea and Sky 海与天之间	20	93.33		
2025	"Slowly" 慢慢	N/A	N/A	NetEase Cloud Music Exclusive	
2025	"Last Night's Wind Tonight’s Moon" 昨夜风今宵月	N/A	N/A	Cover	
2025	"Time Hide and Seek" 时间捉迷藏	82	86.83	Promotional Song for China National Children's Center's project	
2025	"I Heard" 听说你	N/A	N/A	Cover	
2026	"Vivid Echoes" 记忆点	46	90.36		
2026	That's Right	77	86.48		
2026	"Lonely Island" 无人岛	67	86.08		
2026	"Past in My Dreams" 愿忘	70	86.03		
2026	"Just That" 而已	79	85.21		
2026	"Like Me, Like You" 如我如你	74	85.31		
2026	"The Third Hickey" 第三個吻痕	N/A	N/A	Cover	

=== Soundtrack appearances ===
List of soundtrack appearances, showing year released and album name
Year	Title	Peak (TME Uni Chart)		Notes	Ref.
Year	Title	CHN	Score	Notes	Ref.
2021	"Follow the Light" 追随光	72	67.45	Falling Into Your Smile OST	
2021	"Words Of The Wind" 风的话	23	78.47	My Little Happiness OST	
2021	Bling Boom	91	60.01	Please, Classmate OST	
2022	"Zhi" 咫	31	87.18	The Mirror: Twin Cities OST	
2022	"Chain" 连锁	17	91.41	Hello, The Sharpshooter OST	
2022	"Breaking Dawn" 破晓来时	15	90.37	Promotional song for Wild Rift Icons Global Championships	
2022	"Because of you" 因你存在	89	79.01	The Westward: Season 4 OST	
2022	"The one basking in the moonlight" 晒月光的人	15	90.29	Promotional song for mobile game Crossfire	
2022	"Exclusive starry sky " 专属星空	88	80.19	My Girlfriend is an Alien: Season 2 OST	
2022	"An Unexpected Encounter" 不期而遇	83	80.57	Love in Time OST	
2023	"Response" 感应	95	78.55	Ancient Love Poetry OST cover for 2nd Anniversary	
2023	"Obsession" 执生念	-	-	Ancient Love Poetry OST cover for 2nd Anniversary	
2023	"It's You" 是你	-	-	The Furthest Distance OST	
2023	"Lost in Love" 恋恋拾光	-	-	Love is Panacea OST	
2024	"Snow falls on the street" 雪落长街	-	-	Thank you for Warming Me OST	
2024	"Waiting to See You" 等着见你	79	81.38	Paladin Legend OST	
2024	Sweet Dreams, My Dear	52	87.14	Mandarin version Promotional song for mobile game Lost Ark	
2024	"Because of You" 因你			The Land of Warriors OST	
2025	"Return to You" 还君	60	90.06	The Demon Hunter's Romance OST	
2025	"Fall into our Season" 陷入我们的季节	76	86.38	Be Passionately in Love OST	
2025	"Fall into our Season" 写满未来	86	86.58	Our Generation OST	
2025	"Fall into our Season" 当星光落入银河	81	85.65	Sword Rose OST	
2026	"Holding the Piece" 执棋	N/A	N/A	Shadow Love OST	

=== Collaborative singles ===
List of collaborative singles, showing year released, selected chart positions, and name of the album
Year	Title	Peak (TME Uni Chart)		Notes	Ref.
Year	Title	CHN	Score	Notes	Ref.
2019	"Lonely Town" (Yi City group's theme song) 孤城 with Sun Bolun	22	83.76	The Untamed OST	
2022	Please with Zhang Yanqi	10	93.66		
2023	"Mortal Heart" 凡人心 with Zhao Lei	95	81.22	"Lost You Forever" OST	
2024	"Double" 双 with Zhang Yuan	99	79.27	"The Rise Of Ning" OST	
2025	My Dear Friend 听心者 with Yi Sheng	91	86.70	"Ski into Love" OST & "Summit of Our Youth" OST	
2025	"Back to Summer" 回到夏天 feat. Wang Heye	40	91.63		
2025	"The Years We Had Loved" 我们爱了这么多年 with Wang Heye	40	90.26		
2026	"Melting Snow" 化雪 with Liu Yu	30	90.97		

== Filmography ==
=== Television series ===
Year	English title	Chinese title	Role	Network	Ref.
2019	The Untamed	陈情令	Ah Qing	Tencent	
2020	To Dear Myself	亲爱的自己	Lin Ling	Hunan TV and Mango TV	
2024	Love Stories on the Island	海上梦想家	Qiao Ran Ran	Youku	

=== Variety and reality shows ===
Year	English title	Chinese title	Role	Network	Notes	Ref.
2016	Super Girl 2016	2016超级女声	Contestant	Hunan TV	Finished 15th	
2017	Sound of My Dream: Season 2	梦想的声音第二季	Contestant	Zhejiang Television		
2018	Sing Out	这！就是歌唱·对唱季	Contestant	Youku		
2019	lets go! Start with T-house	出发吧！从T-HOUSE开始	Contestant	iQiyi		
2020	Produce Camp 2020	创造营2020	Contestant	Tencent Video	Finished in 4th place	
2020	Super Nova Games: season 3	超新星全运会第三季	Contestant	Tencent Video	Southwest Region Team/Guizhou	
2020	BON-US	硬糖少女BON-US	Herself	Tencent Video		
2021	Youth and Melody	金曲青春	Contestant for CHUANG	Dragon Television	In Episodes 3, 6, 7 and 8	
2021	Stage Boom	爆裂舞台	Contestant	iQiyi	Finished in 2nd place	
2021	The Shining One	闪闪发光的你	Main host	JSTV		
2021	Roast!: Season 5	吐槽大会第五季	Contestant	Tencent Video	In Episode 2	
2021	The Treasured Voice 2	天赐的声音 2	Contestant	Zhejiang Television	In Episode 7	
2021	Super Nova Games: Season 4	超新星全运会第四季	Contestant	Tencent Video	Southwest Region Team/Guizhou	
2023	Infinity and Beyond Season 2	声生不息 宝岛季	Contestant	Mango TV and Hunan Television	In Episodes 1, 2, and 3	
2023	A Tasty Gathering	朋友请吃饭	Regular Cast Member	Tencent Video		
2023	Singing with Legends 5	我们的歌5	Member	Dragon Television		
2023	Mars Intelligence Agency 6	火星情报局6	Regular Cast Member	Youku		
2024	Super Nova Games: Season 5	超新星运动会第五季	Contestant	Tencent Video		
2024	We Are The Champions: Season 3	战至巅峰S3	Contestant	Tencent Video		
2024	Melody Journey	音乐缘计划	Singer	JSTV and iQIYI		
2025	Melody Roaming Season 2	音你而来2	Singer	JSTV and Youku		
2026	HITSONG II	有歌第二季	Singer	Zhejiang Television		
2026	Melody Roaming Season 3	音你而来3	Singer	JSTV and Youku		

== Media ==
=== Advertisements and endorsements ===
Year	English brand/product name	Brand/product name	Type	Notes	Ref.
2021	Neta V	哪吒V	Product ambassador		
2021	Unif pure and noble tea	统一布诺乳茶	Product endorsement		
2021	Chali peach oolong tea	茶里蜜桃乌龙系列	Product endorsement		
2021	Nongfu Spring osmanthus oolong tea	东方树叶桂花乌龙茶	Product endorsement		
2021	realme	真我潮玩	Experience officer		
2021	Hisense super audio picture television	海信超音画电视	Product ambassador		
2022	Beijing Yanjing Brewery	燕京啤酒	Brand endorsement		
2023	Wong Lo Kat Vitamin C drink	刺柠吉	Product ambassador		

=== Magazine appearances ===
Year	Date	English magazine name	Magazine name	Issue	Notes	Ref.
2020	10 July	Southern People Weekly Magazine	《南方人物周刊》		Group feature	
2020	26 July	Dazed	-	August issue	Group feature	
2020	23 September	Cosmopolitan	《时尚COSMO》		Group online feature	
2020	November	Superelle	-		With Liu Xiening and Zhang Yifan	
2020	7 December	Marie Claire	《嘉人》		Group feature	
2020	14 December	Madame Figaro Mode	-	December issue	Group feature	
2021	6 May	TrendsHealth	《时尚健康》	May issue		
2021	10 August	National Geographic Traveler	《时尚旅游》	August issue		
2022	31 October	LINK	《LINK领客》	Autumn issue		
2022	10 November	Purple Pearl	-	November issue		
2022	22 November	PAUSE	《候场PAUSE》	November issue		
2022	31 December	Billboard	-	December issue	New year's celebrities	
2023	13 January	Wonderland	《新视线Wonderland》	January issue		
2023	27 April	TOPS magazine	-	Summer issue		
2023	18 May	Madame Figaro Mode	-			
2023	8 November	1626	-	November issue		
2024	13 May	POSH POSH	-			
2024	11 Sep	ISLAND	《岛ISLAND》			
2025	21 June	VISION	《VISION青年视觉》			
2025	10 July	VanityTeen	《Vanity Teen 名利场青年》			
2025	13 August	K!ND Chic	-	Birthday Issue		
