= Wan Peng =

Chinese actress and dancer (born 1996)

- 万鹏
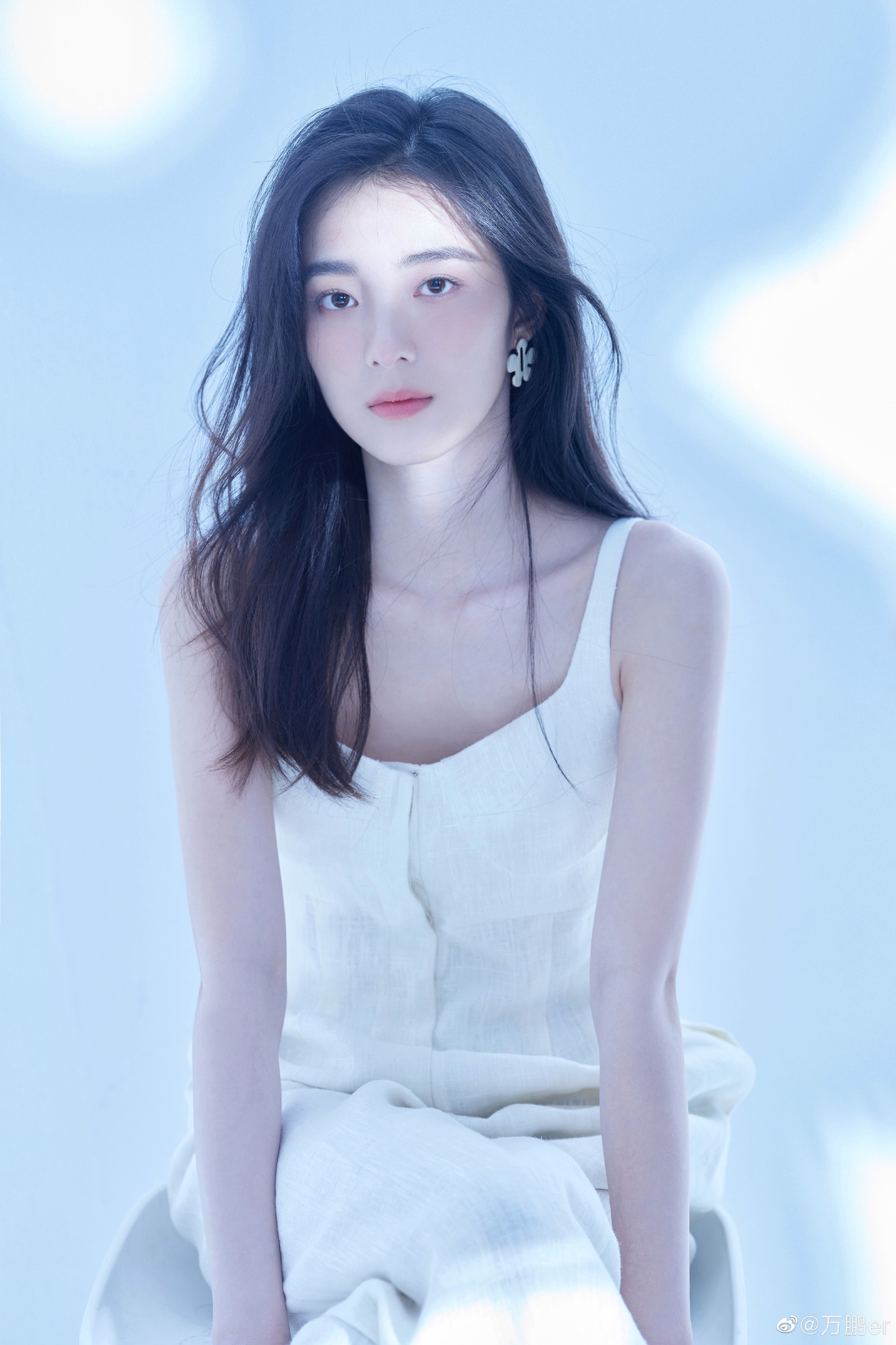
- Wan in 2021
- Born: 20 August 1996 (age 30); Chaoyang District, Beijing, China
- Citizenship: China
- Education: Beijing Dance Academy
- Occupations: Actress; dancer; model
- Years active: 2018–present
- Agent: Easy Plus Entertainment
- Height: 1.67 m (5 ft 6 in)

Chinese name
- Traditional Chinese: 萬鵬
- Simplified Chinese: 万鹏
Transcriptions
Standard Mandarin
- Hanyu Pinyin: Wàn Péng

Wan Peng (Chinese: 万鹏; born 20 August 1996) is a Chinese actress under Easy Entertainment. She made her debut with the drama When We Were Young (2018), and gained significant fame for her performances in first and second seasons of My Girlfriend is an Alien (2019–2022), First Romance (2020), Crush (2021), and Sword and Fairy 6 (2024).

== Early life ==
Wan Peng graduated from the Beijing Dance Academy. Although she studied classical dance in college, she has always been interested in acting. Wan, who did major in dancing, received one year of acting training at Easy Plus Entertainment, where she learned various professional skills and later made her official debut.

== Career ==
On November 22, 2018, Wan made her debut in the coming-of-age youth drama When We Were Young opposite Hou Minghao, for which she received positive reviews and became known for her role. She received the Best Newcomer award at the 4th China News Entertainment Awards 2018 and the Outstanding Actress award at the 7th China Internet Radio and Video Convention.

On April 18, 2019, Wan had guest appearance in the period detective drama Detective L. On March 17, she participated in a variety show Me and My Agent as a guest, and on August 19, she starred as female lead in the hit romantic comedy My Girlfriend is an Alien opposite Xu Zhixian (Bie Thassapak Hsu). By the end of the show, the drama had been viewed over 1 billion times on Tencent Video, while her international popularity also increased. She then attended a fan meeting in Jakarta, Indonesia with her co-star and was awarded Most Promising Television Actor at the 2019 Tencent Video All Star Awards. On November 25, she played supporting role in medical rescue drama Rush Into Danger.

On September 14, 2020, Wan starred in the campus youth romance dramas First Romance opposite Riley Wang, which was broadcast on Youku. On October 13, she starred in another youth romance drama Meeting You opposite Guo Junchen, which was broadcast on Mango TV. The number of views of the drama has remained high since its release, exceeding 100 million in just two days and exceeding 200 million in five days.

On April 11, 2021, she starred as the female lead in the historical drama Love Like White Jade opposite Zhang Yao, which was broadcast on Mango TV. On May 4, she starred in unit drama Faith Makes Great: Stargazing, which was broadcast on Hunan TV, and on May 15, she participated in variety show The Great Arts to promote her drama Love Like White Jade with her co-star. On August 3, she starred in romance drama Crush opposite Lin Yanjun, which was broadcast on iQIYI. After the broadcast, it received positive response from netizens and became one of her successful dramas and was placed on the top of iQIYI's trending list. She also sung its soundtrack "Meeting You" along with Lin Yanjun.

On April 11, 2022, she starred as the female lead in the urban drama A Year Without a Job, co-starring with Jackie Li and Zhai Zilu, which was broadcast on Hunan TV and Mango TV, simultaneously. The drama won first place in five provincial satellite TV networks upon its premiere, topped the Weibo drama hot list and 4th position on Douban real-time hot TV list, and received more than 75 hot searches on the entire network. She also sung its soundtrack "Trouble of Modern People" with the cast. On September 16, she starred in well received fantasy drama My Girlfriend is an Alien 2 opposite Xu Zhixian (Bie Thassapak Hsu). Upon broadcast, the drama became trending on WeTV and received lots views on YouTube, which became the most viewed drama of 2022 on WeTV YouTube channel. Also in the same year, on October 10, she starred in unit drama Our Times: Night Banquet of Tang Palace, where she showed her Chinese classical dance skills.

On July 9, 2023, she starred as the supporting role in the crime suspense drama The Lost 11th Floor, playing the role of a serial killer. She gets positive response from netizens for this role and the drama gets mixed reviews from netizens for its storyline. On November 17, she participated as contestant in a martial arts based variety show Duel of Kung Fu, which was broadcast on Hunan TV and Mango TV, simultaneously. Upon airing, she gets a lot of attraction from netizens for her fighting and dancing skills. On December 31, she participated in a beauty variety show Wo Shi Da Mei Ren (I Am a Big Beauty) as a guest.

On January 18, 2024, she starred as one of main lead in a game based historical drama Sword and Fairy (Chinese Paladin 6) opposite Fu Xinbo, which is based on sixth season of the game The Legend of Sword and Fairy 6, and was broadcast on Tencent Video and Zhejiang TV, simultaneously. She portrayed the role of Luo Zhaoyan, one of the most favorite character of the game. For this role, she got positive response from audience. On February 3, she participated in the 2024 Hunan Satellite TV Spring Festival, performing the poetry and creative show along with Luo Yunxi and others. In March, she participated in game based comedy variety show Hello, Saturday 2024 as a guest for promotion of the drama along with its cast. On April 10, she attended Ami Paris Brand Event Party in Suzhou, China. On April 22, she appeared as a guest in romance drama Will Love in Spring, which gets much response from netizens. In May, she participated in a game based variety show Funny Team as a guest contestant for two episodes. On June 24, she participated in Tencent Video 2024 Drama Party, where she promoted her upcoming urban elite drama Dear Enemy, with her co-star Gao Ye and Michelle Chen. In November, she was selected into the list of young actors in the 2024 Starry Ocean Show. On November 16, she attended 37th China Golden Rooster Awards Ceremony and sang the song "Sea of Stars", with other celebrities who participated in 2024 Starry Ocean Show.

On January 4, 2025, she attended Tencent Video All Star Night 2024 and won the Promising TV Actor of the Year for her outstanding performance in Sword and Fairy (Chinese Paladin 6) and Will Love in Spring.

Wan upcoming project is urban aviation academy based drama Light My Way opposite Ma Sichao, urban elite drama Dear Enemy, romance drama Love's Ambition opposite Tang Xiaotian, ancient costume drama Generation to Generation, where she had guest appearance along with Li Yunrui, crime based police drama Cang Feng, variety show Wonderland Season 5, and ancient martial arts fantasy drama Strongest Sect of All Times (万古最强宗) opposite Peng Yuchang. The drama is currently filming in Hengdian, China.

== Discography ==
=== Soundtrack appearances ===
Title	Year	Album	Notes
"Meeting You"	2021	Crush OST	Along with Lin Yanjun
"The Troubles of Modern People"	2022	A Year Without a Job OST	Along with Jackie Li, Zhai Zilu, and Li Junxian

== Filmography ==
=== Television series ===
Year	English title	Chinese title	Role	Network	Notes
2018	When We Were Young	人不彪悍枉少年	Yang Xi	Tencent Video	Main role
2019	Detective L	绅探	Luo Fei's Sister	Tencent Video	Guest role
2019	My Girlfriend is an Alien	外星女生柴小七	Chai Xiaoqi	Tencent Video	Main role
2019	Rush into Danger	极速救援	Wei Xiaoqing	Hunan TV, Mango TV, iQIYI, Tencent Video	Cameo
2020	First Romance	初恋了那么多年	Xiong Yifan	Youku	Main role
2020	Meeting You	谢谢让我遇见你	Xia Rui	Mango TV	Main role
2021	Love Like White Jade	白玉思无瑕	Shui Wuxia	Mango TV	Main role
2021	Faith Makes Great (Stargazing)	理想照耀中国	Zhou Qi	Hunan TV	Stargazing (episode 34)
2021	Crush	原来我很爱你	Sang Wuyan	iQIYI	Main role
2022	A Year Without a Job	没有工作的一年	He Yu/Xiao Yu	Hunan TV, Mango TV	Main role
2022	My Girlfriend is an Alien 2	外星女生柴小七	Chai Xiaoqi	Tencent Video	Main role
2022	Our Times (Night Banquet of Tang Palace)	我们这十年	Lin Beibei	All Networks of China	Night Banquet of Tang Palace (1-4 Episodes)
2023	The Lost 11th Floor	消失的十一层	Sheng Liya	iQIYI	Support role
2024	Sword and Fairy (Chinese Paladin 6)	仙剑奇侠传六	Luo Zhaoyan	Tencent Video, Zhejiang TV	Main role
2024	Will Love in Spring	春色寄情人	Wang Xixia	CCTV, Tencent Video	Support role
2025	Dear Enemy	亲爱的仇敌	Zhong Qingcheng	Tencent Video	Main role
2025	Love's Ambition	许我耀眼	Qiao Lin	Tencent Video	Support role
2026	Generation to Generation	江湖夜雨十年灯	Cai Pingshu	Tencent Video	Guest role
2026	Cang Feng	藏锋	Bai Jiani	Tencent Video	Main role
TBA	Strongest Sect of All Times	万古最强宗	Lu Qianqian	Tencent Video	Main role
TBA	Liao Zhai	聊斋	Qianqian	Tencent Video	Guest role, episode: "Beauty's Head"
TBA	The Lotus Secret	无邪	Luo Yi	Youku	Guest role
TBA	Winner	赢风	Zhang Qinqin	CCTV, Tencent Video	Main role
TBA	Light My Way	偷走他的心	Lu Zhiyi	Not yet announced	Main role

=== Variety shows ===
Year	English title	Chinese title	Channel	Notes
2019	Me and My Agents	我和我的经纪人	Tencent Video	Guest Appearance
2021	The Great Arts	了不起的艺能	Mango TV	Guest Appearance (Ep.16)
2023	Duel of Kung Fu	来者何人	Hunan TV, Mango TV	Contestant
2023	I Am Big Beauty	我是大美人	Hunan TV, Mango TV	Guest Appearance
2024	Hello, Saturday 2024	你好，星期六 2024	Hunan TV, Mango TV	Guest Appearance (Ep. 9)
2024	The Detectives Adventures Season 4	萌探2024	iQIYI	Guest Appearance (Ep. 3-6)
2024	2024 Hunan TV Spring Festival Gala	2024湖南卫视春晚	Hunan TV, Mango TV	Performance "不到潇湘岂有诗"
2024	Tencent Video 2024 Drama Party	2024腾讯视频鹅剧派对	Tencent Video	Dear Enemy Promotion
2024	2024 Starry Ocean Show	2024 星辰大海	CCTV (Live)	Participant
2024	37th China Golden Rooster Awards Ceremony 2024	第37届中国电影金鸡奖	CCTV	sang the song "Sea of Stars" with others who participated in 2024 Starry Ocean Show
2025	Wonderland Season 5	五十公里桃花坞 第五季	Tencent Video	Member [1-2 Episode]

== Awards and nominations ==
Year	Award	Category	Nominated work	Results	Ref.
2018	4th China News Entertainment Awards	Best Newcomer	When We Were Young	Won	
2019	7th China Internet Radio and Video Convention	Outstanding Actress	When We Were Young	Won	
2019	Tencent Video All Star Awards	Most Promising Television Actress	My Girlfriend is an Alien	Won	
2024	Tencent Video All Star Awards	Most Promising Television Actress	Sword And Fairy	Won	
2025	Tencent Video All Star Awards	Breakthrough Television Actress	Love's Ambition	Won	
