= My Little Happiness =

2021 Chinese television series

- Genre: Romance comedy; Drama
- Based on: You Are My Little Luck (你是我的小确幸) by Dong Ben Xi Gu
- Written by: Liu Fei; Liu Chenguang
- Directed by: Yang Long
- Starring: Xing Fei; Tang Xiaotian; Huang Yilin; Li Chuan
- Opening theme: "Words of the Wind" (风的话) by Chen Zhuoxuan
- Ending theme: "Intimacy" (亲密感) by Jian Hongyi
- Country of origin: China
- Original language: Mandarin
- No. of episodes: 28

Production
- Executive producer: Han Zhijie
- Producers: Huang Xing; Liu Zhimin; Zhang Chi
- Production locations: Shenzhen, China
- Camera setup: Multi-camera
- Running time: 45 minutes
- Production companies: Tencent Penguin Pictures; Tandang Culture

Original release
- Network: Tencent Video
- Release: January 13 – January 27, 2021

My Little Happiness (Chinese: 我的小确幸; pinyin: Wǒ De Xiǎo Què Xìng) is a 2021 Chinese romantic television series starring Xing Fei, Tang Xiaotian, Huang Yilin, and Li Chuan. Directed by Yang Long, it is adapted from the novel You Are My Little Luck (你是我的小确幸) by Dong Ben Xi Gu. It premiered on Tencent Video and WeTV on January 13, 2021, until January 27, 2021.

== Plot ==
Zhuo Rong (Xing Fei) has dreamed of becoming a lawyer for a long time, as her mother is absolutely determined to see her study finance. She successfully convinces her mother that she has set off to study abroad, but has actually begins work at home as a legal intern. Her first case brings her face-to-face with her childhood friend Wen Shao Qing (Tang Xiaotian), but she does not recognize him. Now her client, he is also her new landlord and next-door neighbor. Zhuo Rong and Wen Shaoqing find themselves growing closer despite their best efforts.

== Cast ==
=== Main ===
- Xing Fei as Cong Rong
  - Xu Yixuan as young Cong Rong
- Tang Xiaotian as Wen Shaoqing
- Huang Yilin as Zhou Chengcheng
- Li Chuan as Wen Rang

=== Supporting ===
- Fu Weilun as Zhong Zhen, Cong Rong's cousin
- Liu Chang as Shang Guanyi, Cong Rong's boss
- Wang Mohan as Xiong Jing Jing, Cong Rong's colleague
- Luo Chenshu as Lucy, Da Ren Law Firm's HR employee
- Deng Yuli as Qin Chu, Shaoqing's colleague
- Chang Long as Chen Cu, Shaoqing's colleague
- Yang Anqi as San Bao, Chen Cu's wife
- Sun Letian as Hospital director Yan
- Cui Yi as Cong Rong's mother
- Pan Shiqi as Jiang Yao, Wen Rang's ex-girlfriend
- Wang Bin as Lawyer Tang
- Ge Zhaomei as Shaoqing's grandmother
- Xu Zhengyun as Shaoqing's grandfather
- Liu Pizhong as Shaoqing's father

=== Others ===
- Zhang Yuanyuan as Lawyer Xu (Da Ren Law Firm)
- Stephen Guo as Cheng Cheng's friend
- Liu Weilong as Xiao Lu, Cheng Cheng ex-boyfriend
- Zhang Han as Cheng Cheng's mother
- Gao Guo as Cheng Cheng's father
- Wang Qing as Zhong Zhen's mother
- Sandy Yu as Shaoqing's mother
- Gong Jinguo as Uncle Lin, Shaoqing's patient
- Xu Mingzhe as Uncle Lin's godson
- Chen Yilan as Wen Qing, Cong Rong and Shaoqing's daughter

== Production ==
The film crew officially launched in Shenzhen on January 6, 2020.

The drama serves as a reunion project for Xing Fei and Tang Xiaotian who both starred in the 2019 drama Put Your Head on My Shoulder. This drama also reunites Tang Xiaotian and Huang Yilin who worked together in Bureau of Transformer.

== Soundtrack ==
| No. | English title | Chinese title | Artist | Lyrics | Composer | Arrangement | Notes | Ref. |
|---|---|---|---|---|---|---|---|---|
| 1. | Words of the Wind | 风的话 | Chen Zhuoxuan | Sa Ji | Hwang Yong Ju | Jin Dazhou D-Jin | Opening theme song | |
| 2. | Intimacy | 亲密感 | Jian Hongyi | Lin Qiao | Du Zhiwen | Yu Hao | Ending theme song | |
| 3. | I'm With You | | Sa Ji | | Hwang Yong Ju | Jin Dazhou D-Jin | | |
| 4. | We Are Just Like This | 我们就像这样 | Ning Huanyu | Liu Enxun | Zhao Bell | Guo Weicong | | |
