= Tang Xiaotian =

Chinese actor and model

- Born: June 2, 1991 (age 35); Tianjin, China
- Other name: Daddi Tang
- Education: Beijing Institute of Fashion Technology
- Occupations: Actor; Model
- Years active: 2017–present
- Agent: Up Shero Studio
- Height: 188 cm (6 ft 2 in)

Chinese name
- Simplified Chinese: 唐晓天
- Hanyu Pinyin: Táng Xiǎotiān

Tang Xiaotian (Chinese: 唐晓天; pinyin: Táng Xiǎotiān, born June 2, 1991) is a Chinese actor and model. He is best known for his roles in Put Your Head on My Shoulder (2019), To Get Her (2019), My Little Happiness (2021), The Story of Pearl Girl (2024), Love's Ambition (2025), and How Dare You!? (2026).

== Early life and education ==
Tang Xiaotian was born on June 2, 1991, in Tianjin, China. He graduated from Beijing Institute of Fashion Technology.

== Career ==
Tang made his acting debut in the 2017 web series Forever Young where he played Hu Kankan, Xie Ruolin's brother.

In February 2019, he joined the recurring cast of the series Queen Dugu where he played Yang Yong, the Crown Prince of Sui, the eldest son of Emperor Yang Jian and Empress Dugu Jialuo who is later stripped of his title. In April of the same year, he portrayed the role of Fu Pei in the drama Put Your Head on My Shoulder. On December, he joined the main cast of the series To Get Her where he played Tu Siyi, a famous idol who is trapped in a video game, where he loses all his memories and becomes the 3rd prince.

In 2020, Tang starred as the male lead in Tencent Video's romantic drama series Way Back into Love.

In January 2021, he played the lead role of Wen Shaoqing in the romcom drama series My Little Happiness. The same year Tang joined the recurring cast of the drama The Sword and The Brocade where he played Ou Yanxing / Lin Shixian. In July, he played Jiang Xiaoye in Broker.

== Filmography ==
=== Television series ===
Year	English title	Chinese title	Role	Network	Notes	Ref.
2017	Forever Young	栀子花开2017	Hu Kankan	Sohu TV		
2019	Queen Dugu	独孤皇后	Yang Yong	Tencent Video		
2019	Put Your Head on My Shoulder	致我们暖暖的小时光	Fu Pei	Tencent Video		
2019	Bureau of Transformer	动物管理局	Kevin Zhou	iQIYI		
2019	The Principle	上道	Shao Dongjiang	iQIYI		
2019	To Get Her	殿下攻略	Tu Siyi	Tencent Video, Mango TV		
2020	Way Back into Love	拾光里的我们	Xu Jiaxiu	Tencent Video		
2021	My Little Happiness	我的小确幸	Wen Shaoqing	Tencent Video		
2021	The Sword and The Brocade	锦心似玉	Ou Yanxing / Lin Shixian	Tencent Video		
2021	Broker	心跳源计划	Jiang Xiaoye	Jiangsu TV		
2021	Song of Youth	玉楼春	Li Moxi	Youku	Cameo	
2023	The Ingenious One	云襄传	Su Mingyu	iQIYI		
2023	Bright Eyes in the Dark	他从火光中走来	Jiang Ge	iQIYI		
2023	Chase the Truth	黑白密码	Xu Daluo	Tencent Video	Cameo	
2024	My Wife's Double Life	柳叶摘星辰	Xu Muchen	iQIYI		
2024	The Great Nobody	大王别慌张	Sun Wukong	iQIYI	Cameo	
2024	The Story of Pearl Girl	珠帘玉幕	Zhang Jinran	Youku		
2025	Wanna Be	白日梦与她	Jia Fan	Youku		
2025	With Love with You	有你的时光里	Yi Zhe	Hunan TV, Mango TV		
2025	Love's Ambition	许我耀眼	Yu Yiming	Tencent Video		
2026	How Dare You!	成何体统	Xiahou Bai	iQIYI		
2026	Ashes to Crown	翘楚	Xie Yanfang	Youku		
2026	Life is Elsewhere	欢迎回我的频道	Luo Xin	iQiyi, Sohu TV, Migu Video		
2026	Tigers Sniff the Rose	尚公主	Meng Zaishi	Tencent		
TBA	The Ingenious One 2	云襄传之将进酒	Su Mingyu	iQIYI		
TBA	The Winner	青风吹又生	Lu Chengyu	Youku		

=== Reality shows ===
Year	Title	Chinese title	Note	Ref.
2019	Super Penguin League; Season:2	超级企鹅联盟 Super3	Player; Live Basketball Competition	
