= Chasing the Wind =

Chasing the Wind may refer to:

- Chasing the Wind (TV series), 2024 Chinese television drama
- Chasing the Wind (film), 2025 Turkish romance film

== See also ==
- "Chasin' the Wind", 1991 single by Chicago
