= When We Were Young (TV series) =

2018 Chinese television series

- Promotional poster
- Genre: Romance comedy; Coming-of-age
- Based on: When We Were Young by Yan Sheng
- Written by: Sun Xiao
- Directed by: Deng Ke; Roger Lau
- Starring: Hou Minghao; Wan Peng; Zhang Yao
- Opening theme: "Northern District 4th Floor" (北区楼四) by Liu Houlin
- Ending theme: "In Youth" (少年时) by Hou Minghao
- Country of origin: China
- Original language: Mandarin
- No. of episodes: 24

Production
- Executive producer: Han Zhi Jie
- Producers: Wang Rouxuan; Li Er Yun
- Camera setup: Multi-camera
- Running time: 45 minutes
- Production companies: Tencent Penguin Pictures; Shanghai Yaoke Media Co., Ltd.

Original release
- Network: Tencent Video; Mango TV
- Release: November 22 – December 8, 2018

When We Were Young (Chinese: 人不彪悍枉少年; pinyin: Rén Bù Biāo Hànwǎng Shàonián) is a 2018 Chinese streaming television series starring Hou Minghao, Wan Peng, and Zhang Yao. Based on the novel of the same name, it tells a nostalgic story that revolves around high school students during the year 1996. It premiered on Tencent Video, Mango TV and WeTV on November 22, 2018 until December 8, 2018.

== Cast ==
=== Main ===
- Hou Minghao as Hua Biao
- Wan Peng as Yang Xi
  - Li Yazhen as child Yang Xi
- Zhang Yao as Li Yu
  - Wei Renhao as child Li Yu
- Pan Meiye as Yangxiao Hemei
- Li Mingde as Situ Er Tiao

=== Supporting ===
- Dai Luwa as Huang Deng Deng
- Chen Xijun as Yang Chao, Yangxi's brother
- Wang Sen as Kong Xiaojun
- Wu Yanshu as Shi Junfang, Hua Biao's grandmother
- Tian Miao as Du Yuemei, Yangxi's mother
- Wei Yibo as Yang Weiguo, Yangxi's father
- Sun Shuaihang as Director of Li Gun'er
- Wei Zixin as Li Yu's father
- Wang Xiuzhu as Xiao Hongbai
- Guo Zhongyou as Situ Dong Feng
- Su Xin as He Mei's mother
- Chen Huijuan as Situ Er Tiao's mother
- Yu Xinhe as Xiao Lan
- Sun Letian as Pang Tuotuo
- Ning Xiaohua as Wang Laowu

=== Others ===
- Feng Bo as Li Yu's mother
- Du Heqian as Huang Dengdeng's mother
- Zhao Ziqi as Yang Ming
- Man Jianwu (满建武) as Xiao Lan's younger brother
- Wang Siqin (王思钦) as Aunt Huang
- Tian Shuang as Yang Ming's aunt
- Song Jingao (宋景奥) as Hua Biao's father
- Long Xinyue as Hua Biao's mother
- Yao Bing as He Mei's father
- Liu Yingjie (刘英杰) as Gao Zhihang
- Zhang Chenlu (张晨璐) as Liu Beisi
- Zhao Bowen (肇博文) as Bai Yunpeng
- Xiao Wei as Biology Teacher
- Chen Yijun (陈怡君) as Liu Dan
- Yao Yiqi as Bicycle thief

== Soundtrack ==
| No. | English title | Chinese title | Artist | Notes | Ref. |
|---|---|---|---|---|---|
| 1. | Northern District 4th Floor | 北区楼四 | Liu Houlin | Opening theme song | |
| 2. | In Youth | 少年时 | Hou Minghao | Ending theme song | |
| 3. | When We Were Young | 人不彪悍枉少年 | Hou Minghao | | |
| 4. | Companion | 相伴 | Hou Minghao, Zhang Yao, Li Mingde | | |
| 5. | Grateful | 感谢 | Li Ziting | | |
