= Chang Long =

Chinese actor

- Born: March 24, 1990 (age 36); Zhengzhou, Henan, China
- Education: Central Academy of Drama
- Occupation: Actor
- Years active: 2012–present
- Known for: Song of Youth; The Bond; New Life Begins
- Height: 1.77 m (5 ft 10 in)

Chang Long (Chinese: 昌隆, 1990– ) is a Chinese actor born in Zhengzhou, Henan.

== Biography ==
Chang Long developed an interest in acting from a young age and graduated from the Central Academy of Drama.

In October 2012, Chang Long officially entered the entertainment industry with a supporting role in the action-adventure film Bait 3D, though his scenes were deleted. In 2013, he participated in the romance film Rhythm of the Rain, directed by Vincent Fang.

In 2018, he rose to prominence playing Lu Yuchen in My Classmate from Far Far Away, produced by Xu Jinglei, and also appeared in the costume drama The Rise of Phoenixes that same year.

From 2019 to 2020, he appeared in dramas such as Ming Dynasty and You Are My Destiny. 2021 was a major turning point in his career, gaining widespread attention and praise for the costume comedy Song of Youth (playing Sun Jinge) and the highly acclaimed drama The Bond (playing Song Qingyuan).

In 2022, his popularity rose further with the drama New Life Begins, where he played the Fifth Prince Yin Qi; he also appeared in Thousand Years for You. In 2023, he successively appeared in hit dramas such as Nothing But You, Hilarious Family, and Romance on the Farm. From 2024 to 2026, works featuring him such as Reborn for Love, The Story of the Book, Yan Yu Yong An, and Young and Promising were released to the audience.

== Filmography ==
=== Television / Web Series ===
Year	Title	Role	Notes
2015	Hidden Motive (隐秘动机)	Xiao Gang	Web series
2018	My Classmate from Far Far Away (同学两亿岁)	Lu Yuchen	
2018	Soldier King (兵王)		
2018	Our Youth (我们的青春期)	Baozi	
2018	The Rise of Phoenixes (天盛长歌)	Feng Hao	
2019	Love Is Deep (浅情人不知)	Gao Ren	
2019	Red Shark Assault (红鲨突击)	Yang Jiao	
2020	Consummation (拾光的秘密)	Zhang Ping	Web series
2021	My Little Happiness (我的小确幸)	Chen Cu	Web series
2021	Court Lady (骊歌行)	Prince Zhao	
2021	Song of Youth (玉楼春)	Sun Jinge	
2021	Couple of Mirrors (双镜)	Feng Hong	Web series
2021	The Bond (乔家的儿女)	Song Qingyuan	
2022	Thousand Years for You (请君)	Peng Dahai (Male)	Web series
2022	New Life Begins (卿卿日常)	Yin Qi	Web series
2022	Youth is Just Right (青春正好)	Han Muyang	Web series
2023	Nothing But You (爱情而已)	Lu Zhichao	
2023	Hilarious Family (兰闺喜事)	Shizi (The Prince)	Web series
2023	Romance on the Farm (田耕纪)	Thirteen (Shi San)	Web series
2024	Reborn for Love (四海重明)	Mu Zhanting	Web series
2025	Filter (滤镜)	Zhou Jinli	Web series
2025	A Dream Within A Dream (书卷一梦)	Nan Rui	Web series
2025	Fen Fang Xi Shi (芬芳喜事)	Ruan Ling	
2025	Yan Yu Yong An (宴遇永安)	Shen Shaojie	Web series
2025	Da Chu Xiao Xu (大厨小婿)	Qiao Zhi	
2026	Young and Promising (年少有为)	Li Shi	Web series
TBA	Hong Chen Si He (红尘四合)		
TBA	Yu Dian Qiu (玉簟秋)		
TBA	The Legend of Lu Xiaofeng	Zhu Ting	

=== Film ===
Year	Title	Role	Notes
2012	Bait 3D (大海啸之鲨口逃生)	Chinese Rescue Team Member David	Scenes deleted
Unreleased	Seven Nights of Soul Chasing (七夜追魂)	Xiao Hai	Filmed in 2012
2013	Rhythm of the Rain (听见下雨的声音)	Dancer	
2014	Monk Legend: Battle of Chengzigou (武僧传奇之决战程子沟)	Ge Dan	
2014	Male Soldier Female Company Commander (男兵女连长)	Sun Xiaojiang	
2015	Monk Legend: Cuju Battle (武僧传奇之蹴鞠之战)	Jian Gu	
2015	Monk Legend: Ultimate Battle (武僧传奇之终极一战)	Jue Yuan	
2016	The Male Fox Liaozhai (男狐聊斋)	Yan Yi	Web film
2018	Master Legend (天师传)	Zhong Dazhi	Web film
2018	Graduation Trip (毕业旅行笑翻天)	Qiang Qiang	
2019	Savage (雪暴)	Zhang Lu	
2019	Da Dao Li (达道里)	Luo Rui	
2020	Oversize Love (月半爱丽丝)	A-Zheng	
2023	Neighborhood Doctor (邻里邻医)	Xing Yuan	Television film
2024	Strange Events in Changle Town (常乐镇诡事)	Hu Guohua	Web film
