= Forget You Remember Love =

2020 Chinese television series

- Promotional poster
- Genre: Romance; Comedy
- Based on: The Prince Who Turns into a Frog by Luo Cai Juan
- Written by: Yang Zi Su; Xi Wen Ting
- Directed by: Liang Wen Yi
- Starring: Xing Fei; Jin Ze; Wen Yuan
- Opening theme: "Unbridled Love" by Chen Xiang
- Country of origin: China
- Original language: Mandarin
- No. of seasons: 1
- No. of episodes: 38

Production
- Producers: Fang Fang; Shen Lingwei
- Camera setup: Multi-camera
- Running time: 45 minutes per episode
- Production companies: Tencent Penguin Pictures; Beijing Kaixin Wenhua

Original release
- Network: Tencent Video; Mango TV
- Release: March 23 – April 27, 2020

Related
- The Prince Who Turns into a Frog

Forget You Remember Love (Chinese: 忘记你，记得爱情; pinyin: Wàngjì nǐ, jìdé àiqíng) is a 2020 Chinese television series starring Xing Fei and Jin Ze. It is the remake of 2005 Taiwanese drama The Prince Who Turns into a Frog. It aired on Tencent Video and Mango TV from March 23 to April 27, 2020, in 38 episodes.

== Synopsis ==
The plot follows an ordinary girl who rescues the CEO of Senwell after he loses his memory in a severe car accident.

Shan Jun Hao is the CEO of Senwell. He's a successful hard-hitting, ruthless, arrogant leader who never takes half measures to achieve what he wants. He is extremely talented, cultured and a business genius. He grew up with Fan Yun Yi (who he is engaged to) & Xu Zi Xian (his father's best friend's son) whose parents died when their yacht blew up. Zi Xian is secretly in love with Fan Yun Yi. Both Yun Yi & Zi Xian work for Senwell.

Sun Jun Hao's first encounter with Ye Qian Yu is not a pleasant one. During an ocean swimming contest, where the 1st prize is 5,000 Yuan, Ye Qian Yu is winning, but is unable to complete the race, because Shan Jun Hao's boat hit a rock & he fell overboard into the water. She has to stop to save him from drowning & performs CPR on him on the beach. When she revives him, she asks him for compensation because she lost the contest when she went to rescue him & had to give him mouth to mouth resuscitation to revive him. He gives her an IOU & contact phone number for her requested compensation & the cost of dry clothes. He asks to use her cellphone so he can call to be picked up. After Shan Jun Hao is picked up, he forgets to tell his assistant, Li Da Wei, about the IOU, so when she calls, the assistant, he rejects her request & hangs up. Qian Yu thinks Jun Hao is a liar & a cheat.

She doesn't know Shan Jun Hao has mandated the closure of the Guan Mei Hotel, a place Ye Qian Yu holds dear to her heart. The owner of Guan Mei Hotel, Mr. Tang, goes to Senwell to see the CEO because he received a demolition order even though he had been given time to repay his loan. Mr. Tang causes a ruckus & is kicked out by the CEO.

When Shan Jun Hao gets into a serious car accident on his engagement day, he wakes up with no memories of his past. While driving home, Ye Qian Yu encounters him on the road & thinks she hit him causing his amnesia. She recognizes him as the guy she rescued from drowning & takes him in. Giving him the name, Tan Hao, from the IOU she got from Jun Hao. She doesn't know he is Shan Jun Hao.

Eventually, they grow closer & fall in love through time spent together. Tan Hao helps improve Guan Mei Hotel by changing the hotel's name to Guan Mei Inn, giving the staff better hotel training & customer service which starts to turn a profit for the inn. Discovery by Tan Hao, Qian Yu & Tai Chu (a travel blogger hired by GQ Ventures to provide a feasibility report on the fishing village) of the return of White Chinese dolphins, a protected species, helps to protect the village from demolition & commercialization. Qian Yu worries one day when Tan Hao's memory returns, he might leave. Tan Hao wants to stay with Qian Yu forever & doesn't wants his memory back.

Unfortunately, Tan Hao gets hit by a van in a plot by a couple of Senwell board members to kidnap him to prevent his return to Senwell which fails because Qian Yu intervenes, but gets struck by a baton, then other people show up & the kidnappers leave. Tan Hao regains his memory as Jun Hao & forgets about Qian Yu & the time he spent in Guan Mei Fishing village.

Qian Yu tries to make Jun Hao remember her & the time he spent in the village, but he rejects her time and again. Couple of times, Qian Yu saves Jun Hao & Senwell. Jun Hao eventually falls for Qian Yu again, but is it too late. They goes through a lot of misunderstandings, betrayals, jealousies, accidents, company conspiracies, corporate espionage & conflicts.

== Cast ==
=== Main ===
- Xing Fei as Ye Qian Yu
- Jin Ze as Shan Jun Hao / Tong Hao (CEO of Senwell)
  - Wang Zi Qian as young Shan Jun Hao

=== Supporting ===
People around Qianyu

- Wen Yuan as Tai Chu
- Joyce Chao as Chen Jin Zhi (Qian Yu's stepmother)
- Xue Bo Wen as Ye Sheng Zhe (Qian Yu's stepbrother)
- Dong Zhi Cheng as Tang Shun Ming (Jin Zhi's ex-husband)

People around Jun Hao

- Jiang Xing Cheng as Fan Yun Yi (Jun Hao's fiancée)
  - Yu Wei Ni as young Fan Yun Yi
- Li Zheng Jun as Xu Zi Qian (Jun Hao's closest friend)
  - Xu Wei Luo as young Xu Zi Qian
- Jurat as Zhang Ming Han (Jun Hao's rival)
- Yang Ming Na as Jiang Cai Yue (Jun Hao's mother)
- Wang Jian Xin as Shan Yao Long (Jun Hao's father)
- Yang Yu Bin as Li Da Wei (Jun Hao's assistant)

Guan Mei Village

- Yu Xiao as Lin Feng Qiao
- Pan Yi Yi as Su Li Yin
- Tao Hui as A Sheng
- Guo Hong Qing as Chef
- Yang Ming as Li Dong Lu
- Zhou Li Li as Granny Hua Zi

Employees of Senwell Group

- Huang Sheng Hui as Jia Li
- Sun Mao Feng as Zhao Qun

Others

- Zhang Lei as CEO Wang
- Guan Dong Jie as CEO Luo
- Li Dong as CEO Lin
- Sun Le Tian as CEO Dong
- Paul Hsu as Xie Quan
- Li Xiong as Ding Yuan Xun
- Yan Zhi Ping as Jiang Xiao Qiang
- Gao Yi Yi as Xue Ge Ge
- Deng Yue Ran as Psychologist
- Xin Er as Aunt Lin
- Li Mei as Xiao Ge
- Li Shi Lin as Ling Yi
- Zhang Meng Mei as Xiao Hua
- Hu Hu as Purchasing Manager
- Li Chen Xi as Executive Liu
- Zhang Shu Qi as Little girl
- Xiao Wei as Chief Doctor
