= Lin Yi =

Chinese actor and model (born 1999)

- Born: January 11, 1999 (age 27); Hebei, China
- Education: Beijing Sports University
- Occupations: Actor; Model
- Years active: 2019–present
- Agent: Tangren Media
- Notable work: Put Your Head on My Shoulder (2019); Derailment (2023)
- Height: 6 ft 2 in (1.88 m)

Chinese name
- Traditional Chinese: 林一
- Simplified Chinese: 林一
Transcriptions
Standard Mandarin
- Hanyu Pinyin: Lín Yī

Lin Yi (Chinese: 林一; pinyin: Lín Yī, born January 11, 1999) is a Chinese actor and model. He gained popularity after starring in the 2019 romantic web series Put Your Head on My Shoulder, which brought him wider recognition.

== Early life and education ==
Lin Yi was born in Hebei and grew up in Shenyang, Liaoning. In 2015, he received the top score in the unified examination of dance majors in Liaoning Province and was admitted to the Beijing Sport University, majoring in Dancesport.

== Career ==
=== 2015–2018: Career beginnings ===
In 2015, while still in his first year of university, Lin Yi was discovered by the agent and signed with Tangren Media Co. Ltd. In 2016, during his summer vacation abroad, he received education in professional training in dance and performance. In 2017, he participated in the casting of the youth campus web series My Huckleberry Friends and auditioned for the male lead, Lin Yang, but ultimately failed.

In May 2017, Lin Yi participated in Youku's idol reality show Beautiful Youth Academy as a cast member. During the show's acting class, he restored the clip from the film Mr. Six by Feng Xiaogang. After the acting class, Director Feng recognized Lin Yi's acting skills and said he would become a good actor. On November 7, 2017, he participated in Youku's fashion variety show Crazy Wardrobe and won the 6th championship with 41 votes. In December 2017, he was confirmed to star in the scifi film Hope Island with Duan Yihong and Andy García.

=== 2019–present: Rising popularity ===
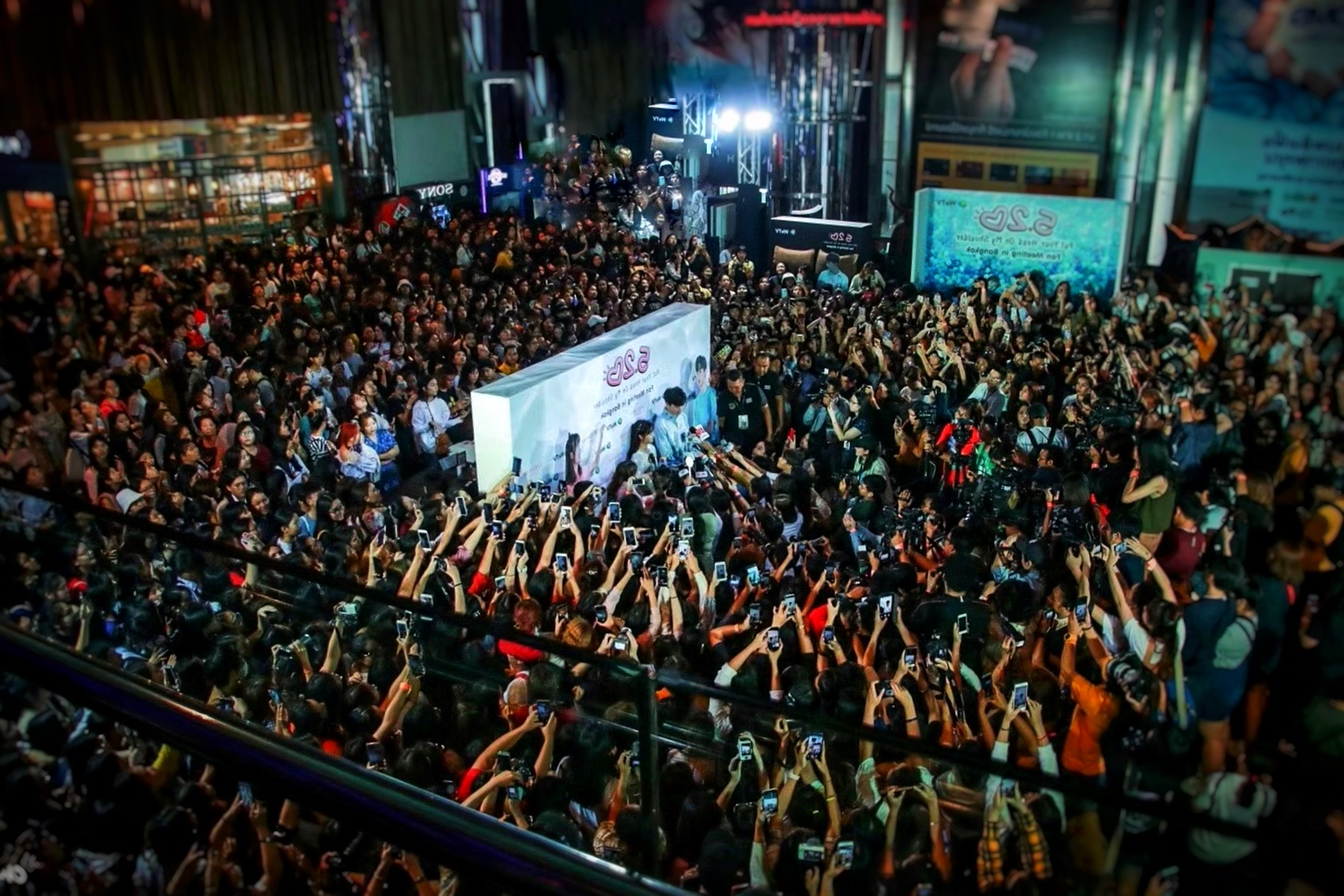
Lin Yi and Xing Fei at the fan meeting in Bangkok on 20 May 2019

In 2019, Lin Yi started gaining increased attention and popularity with his role as Gu Wei Yi in the romantic comedy web series Put Your Head on My Shoulder, which is based on Zhao Qianqian's novel of the same name. The series has gained a cult following both in China and overseas, and Lin Yi's portrayal of Gu Wei Yi has received favorable reviews, making him popular. On May 20, 2019, Lin Yi and his co-star Xing Fei held a grand fan meeting in Bangkok, Thailand, where thousands of fans gathered. Also, Lin Yi was featured in the May issue of Harper's Bazaar Hong Kong. In November 2019, he was nominated for the "Best Actor Award for Chinese Contemporary TV Dramas" at the 26th Huading Awards with the series Put Your Head on My Shoulder. In December 2019, he was honored with the "Youth Trending Artist of the Year" award at the Tencent Video All Star Night and the "New Actor of the Year" award at the 4th Golden Blossom Internet Film and Television Awards.

In 2020, Lin Yi starred in the web series The Blessed Girl and Memory of Encaustic Tile. On October 1, 2020, the song "My Motherland", a tribute to the 71st anniversary of the founding of the People's Republic of China sung by Lin Yi together with other artists, was released.

On January 29, 2021, the costume adventure fantasy web series The Blessed Girl, starring Zhao Jinmai and Yuan Hong, was launched on Tencent Video, in which Lin Yi plays the aspiring young monarch, Yuan Yi. On April 28, the web series Love Scenery was aired, in which Lin Yi co-stars with Xu Lu and plays the role of Lu Jing, an e-sports anchor. In October, he joined Zhejiang TV's variety show Keep Running: Yellow River Season 2 as a cast member. On December 27, he was selected into the 2021 Movie Channel "Starry Oceans" Young Actor Selection Program.

On January 26, 2022, the web series Memory of Encaustic Tile was aired on Youku, in which Lin Yi co-stars with Chen Yuqi and plays the role of Zheng Su Nian. On April 2, the film One Week Friends was released, in which he co-stars with Zhao Jinmai and Shen Yue and plays Xu You Shu.

In September 2023, Lin Yi visited South Korea to hold 23 meet-and-greet events for the upcoming film One Week Friends. On December 14, the time-travel and suspense web series Derailment was aired on Youku, with Lin Yi co-starring with Liu Haocun and portraying Qi Lian.

On March 1, 2024, the web series Everyone Loves Me, starring Lin Yi and Zhou Ye, was broadcast on Youku and aired on March 19 on Netflix. Lin Yi plays Gu Xun, a reserved guy who unknowingly falls for the girl he rejects. On March 9, the TV series Angels Fall Sometimes he co-stars with Li Landi, adapted from the Japanese series The Hours of My Life, was broadcast. Lin Yi plays Lin Tuo, an interior designer diagnosed with ALS. On June 8, the TV series The Tale of Rose starring Liu Yifei was broadcast, in which Lin Yi plays He Xi, a young pilot whom the heroine has a crush on. He has completed filming for the series Smile Code with Shen Yue and Ski into Love with Esther Yu, both highly anticipated by the public.

In August 2025, Lin Yi was announced to star opposite Lu Yuxiao in the modern romance drama When I Meet the Moon, based on the novel of the same name by Zhu Yi.

== Filmography ==
=== Television and web series ===
Year	English title	Original title	Role	Network.	Ref.
2019	Put Your Head on My Shoulder	致我们暖暖的小时光	Gu Wei Yi	Tencent Video	
2021	The Blessed Girl	玲珑	Yuan Yi	Tencent Video	
2021	Love Scenery	良辰美景好时光	Lu Jing / Herman / Liu Mo Yan	iQIYI, Tencent Video	
2021	Put Your Head on My Shoulder 2021 (Thai Remake)	อุ่นไอในใจเธอ 2021	Gu Wei Yi (guest appearance)	WeTV	
2022	Memory of Encaustic Tile	昔有琉璃瓦	Zheng Su Nian	Youku	
2022	Hu Tong [zh]	胡同	Ouyang Hui	CCTV-8, Mango TV, Tencent Video	
2022	Our Times [zh]	我们这十年	Ye Zhou	Zhejiang TV, Dragon TV, Jiangsu TV, Guangdong TV, Youku, iQIYI, Tencent Video, Mango TV, Migu	
2023	Derailment [zh]	脱轨	Qi Lian	Youku	
2024	Everyone Loves Me	别对我动心	Gu Xun	Youku	
2024	Angels Fall Sometimes	谢谢你温暖我	Lin Tuo	CCTV-8, Tencent Video	
2024	The Tale of Rose	玫瑰的故事	He Xi	CCTV-8, Tencent Video	
2024	Smile Code	失笑	Liang Dai Wen	Tencent Video	
2025	Ski into Love	嘘，国王在冬眠	Shan Chong	Youku	
2026	When I Meet the Moon	折月亮	Fu Shize	iQIYI	

=== Film ===
Year	English title	Native title	Role	Ref.
2022	One Week Friends [zh]	一周的朋友	Xu You Shu	
TBA	Our Destiny	我们的命中注定	Lin Jun He / Lin Shao Min	
TBA	Hope Island	希望岛		

=== Variety show ===
Year	English title	Chinese title	Role	Notes/Ref.
2017	Beautiful Youth Academy	美少年学社	Cast member	
2017	Crazy Wardrobe	疯狂衣橱	Contestant	Episode 6–10, final winner
2019	Happy Camp	快乐大本营	Guest	20191116, sings "Those Bygone Years" with partner Xing Fei
2019	Magic Hanzi	神奇的汉字	Guest	Episode 45–48, "Battle for the Ultimate Elite"
2020	Happy Camp	快乐大本营	Guest	20201017
2021	Happy Camp	快乐大本营	Guest	20210220
2021	Day Day Up	天天向上	Guest	20210502
2021	Keep Running: Yellow River Season 2	奔跑吧·黄河篇第二季	Cast member	Episode 1–5
2022	Let's Go Skiing	超有趣滑雪大会	Cast member	Winter fun entertainment snow variety show
2022	Hello, Saturday	你好，星期六	Guest	20220205, solo dance "The Sounds of Snowfall"
2023	Hello, Saturday	你好，星期六	Guest	20231021
2024	Hello, Saturday	你好，星期六	Guest	20240210; 20240713; 20240720; 20241221
2024	All Out Action Season 3	全力以赴的行动派 第三季	Cast member	
2024	Natural High: Season 2	现在就出发	Recurring member	

== Discography ==
=== Single ===
Year	English title	Chinese title	Introduction	Ref.
2020	"My Homeland"	我的祖国	A tribute song to the 71st anniversary of the founding of PRC	
2024	"Confession Scene"	告白画面	Everyone Loves Me OST (with Zhou Ye)	

== Awards and nominations ==
Year	Award	Category	Nominated work	Results	Ref.
2019	26th Huading Awards	Best Actor in Chinese Contemporary Dramas	Put Your Head on My Shoulder	Nominated	
2019	4th Golden Blossom Internet Film and Television Awards	New Actor of the Year	Put Your Head on My Shoulder	Won	
2019	Tencent Video All Star Night 2019	Youth Trending Artist of the Year	—N/a	Won	
2023	Television Series of China Quality Ceremony 2023	Quality Emerging Drama Star	Our Times	Won	
2024	Weibo Awards 2023	Weibo Anticipated Actor of the Year	Derailment	Won	
2024	Yuewen Global IP Awards	Promising IP Actor of the Year	—N/a	Won	
2024	4th New Era International TV Festival Ammolite Awards	Most Promising Actor of the New Era	Derailment	Nominated	
2024	Weibo TV & Internet Video Summit 2024	Progressive Actor of the Year	—N/a	Won	
2024	Tencent Entertainment White Paper Awards 2024	Influential Actor in TV Series of the Year	—N/a	Won	
2025	Weibo Awards 2024	Weibo Breakthrough Actor of the Year	—N/a	Won	
