= Chasing the Wind (TV series) =

2024 Chinese television series

- Promotional release poster
- Simplified Chinese: 我将喜欢告诉了风
- Hanyu Pinyin: Wo Jiang Xi Huan Gao Su Le Feng
- Genre: Coming-of-age; Romance; Sports drama
- Based on: I Will Like to Tell the Wind by Tang Zhifeng
- Written by: Ba Yue Chang An
- Directed by: Wu Bin; Zou Xi; Hao Wanjun
- Starring: Jiang Zhenyu; Gu Zicheng
- Country of origin: China
- Original language: Mandarin
- No. of seasons: 1
- No. of episodes: 20

Production
- Production locations: Harbin, China
- Running time: 33–41 minutes
- Production company: Shandong Film and Television

Original release
- Network: Tencent Video
- Release: December 23 – December 29, 2024

Chasing the Wind (Chinese: 我将喜欢告诉了风; pinyin: Wo Jiang Xi Huan Gao Su Le Feng) is a 2024 Chinese coming-of-age romance sports drama television series starring Jiang Zhenyu and Gu Zicheng. It is based on the Chinese novel I Will Like to Tell the Wind.

Principal photography commenced in March 2022 at Harbin and took 78 working days to complete. The series aired on Tencent Video from December 23 until December 29, 2024.

== Cast ==
- Jiang Zhenyu as Lin Ge
- Gu Zicheng as Nie Chi
- Shi Mingze as Fang Chao
- Chen Jiawen as Zhu Zhu
- Xia Ningjun as Gao Kai
- Zeng Youzhen as Xie Lingwei
- Sun Cailun as Zhou Yao
- Lu Lu as Jin Xinxin

== Production ==
=== Development ===
The series was commissioned by the National Radio and Television Administration. The series was announced on Tencent.

=== Casting ===
Initially, Lin Yi, Wang Churan and Xu Mengjie was considered for the role. Later on, Jiang Zhenyu and Gu Zicheng were cast in the lead roles.

=== Filming ===
Filming began in March 2022 and officially ended in June 2022. Filming took place in Harbin, China.

== Release ==
The series was made available to stream on Tencent Video on December 23, 2024.

== Reception ==
The series received positive reviews. NetEase ranked it #10 in 2024.

== See also ==
- List of Tencent Video original programming
