= TH Entertainment =

Chinese record label

T.H Entertainment, Ltd.
- Native name: 天浩盛世有限公司
- Company type: Private
- Industry: entertainment
- Founded: 2006
- Founder: Zhou Hao
- Headquarters: Beijing, China
- Number of locations: 1
- Area served: China and Hong Kong
- Key people: Zhou Hao (CEO)
- Services: record label
- Owner: Zhou Hao
- Website: www.thmusic.com.cn

T.H Entertainment
- Founded: 2006
- Founder: Zhou Hao
- Genre: Mandopop
- Country of origin: China
- Location: Beijing, China
- Official website: www.thmusic.com.cn

TH Entertainment is a Chinese record label found in 2006 by Zhou Hao.

== History ==
The company was after successful music labels in Japan, South Korea, and Taiwan. Tianhao flourishing cultural transmission (Beijing) Co., Ltd. was established in 2005, is the temperament of Mainland China's most current entertainment brand, the company is a record production and distribution, packaging singer, performing agents, film and television production, public relations planning and professional training for artists integrated culture and entertainment company.

Currently owns eight wholly owned subsidiaries and independent studio, is involved in performing agents, packaging training, video production, public relations planning, media magazines and other fields.

The company has the youngest in Mainland China, a professional entertainment marketing group. Committed to a new business philosophy and mode of operation, and promote recreational and cultural development of the Mainland. Company Law into a "customer-centric, entertainment-oriented" for the purpose, to create the music, film and television drama production, marketing, entertainment brokers, business cooperation, unlimited value-added services and other new technology as the core, highly concentrated industry enterprise platform.

2005 Tianhao Culture Communication Co., Ltd. was established flourishing in Korea in 2005 signed Tianhao combination of THE COLOR Golden Age, and get new Top Ten CCTV SARA 2006, Korea officially joined Tianhao Golden Age, the first family member to become TH 2007 Tianhao prosperity and China has become a strategic partner Jackie Chan 2009 national idol days to join Tianhao group HIT-5 Prime, TH family members to become full record in 2009 after a string musical genius joined Tianhao flourishing, TH family members become China's first women's dance in 2009 days SPY join Tianhao flourishing group, as family members, TH 2010, South Korea, Mina joined Tianhao prosperity, family members become TH 2010 Investment Management Co., Ltd. Shanghai Hongtuo injection Tianhao flourishing, as the controlling shareholder Tianhao Saatchi Saatchi in 2010 Tianhao and search-ho (Ba Ba) Enterprise Management Co., the company entered into a strategic partnership work 2011 to begin preparations Tianhao Prime Entertainment Group in Mainland China in 2011 the largest "cultural interviews will be" "VnC Search Hao IN music show" full swing

TH's music Tianhao flourishing record company has signed artists SARA (South Korea), after the string, HIT-5, Liu Jia, SPY.

TH music, in recent years, is the fastest growing mainland Chinese company, the company adhere to the production of sophisticated, high-standard packaging, perfect planning, publicity and promotion. Established since 2005, every year insist on the introduction of high-quality music, produced music album SARA "destiny", SARA "I'M SARA", SARA "the influx of women Mi Zhou," after the string "baby face", HIT- 5 "nothing is love", HIT-5 "Running", and in the market to get great response. TH's music artists are well-planned package promotion, awareness has been greatly improved.

== Artists ==
=== Male ===
- Niu Junfeng
- Hou Xian
- Liu Jia
- Sha Baoliang
- Yang Kun
- Man Wenjun
- Aska Yang
- Guo Yi

=== Female ===
- Xing Fei
- SARA
- Jike Junyi
- Jin Sha
- Xiang Xiang
- Tan Weiwei
- Chen Zhuoxuan
- Ai Mi (艾米 艾鯠米)

=== Group ===
- HIT-5
- S.P.Y
- Kiss and Cry

=== Former ===
- Chen Xu

== See also ==
- Avex Taiwan
- List of record labels
