= Love Scenery =

2021 Chinese television series

- Genre: Romantic comedy
- Based on: A bright spear is easy to hide, but a secret love is hard to prevent (明枪易躲，暗恋难防) by Qiao Yao (翘摇)
- Written by: Xu Mengjia; Qin Wen; Luo Xiaoting; Qiao Yao
- Directed by: Qin Zhen
- Starring: Lin Yi; Xu Lu
- Opening theme: "Never Stop" (絕不止步) by Duan Aojuan
- Ending theme: "You Have Me" (你是我所有) by Liu Yuning
- Country of origin: China
- Original language: Mandarin
- No. of seasons: 1
- No. of episodes: 31

Production
- Executive producer: Yang Bei
- Producers: Gong Yu; Tang Panjing; Wang Li; Tong Hua
- Camera setup: Multi-camera
- Running time: 45 minutes per episode
- Production companies: Tencent Penguin Pictures; Xinglian Film and Television

Original release
- Network: Tencent Video; iQiyi
- Release: April 8 – May 1, 2021

Love Scenery (Chinese: 良辰美景好时光; pinyin: Liángchén měijǐng hǎo shíguāng) is a 2021 Chinese television series directed by Qin Zhen, adapted from the Web novel A Bright Spear is Easy to Hide, but A Secret Love is Hard to Prevent (明枪易躲，暗恋难防) by Qiao Yao. It starred Lin Yi and Xu Lu in the leading roles.

== Cast ==
=== Main ===
- Lin Yi as Lu Jing
- Xu Lu as Liang Chen

=== Supporting ===
- Hu Bing as Ding Jiayun
- Hu Yunhao as Sun Binyu
- Chong Danni as Ma Shanshan
- Wang Ting as Liu Yiqing, Liang Chen's manager
- Jiang Yu Wei as Yuan Keke, Liang Chen's assistant
- Wang Cheng as Zhoudan, Lu Jing's roommate
- Wang Rong as Liu-er, Lu Jing's roommate
- Zhong Zheng as Heye, Lu Jing's roommate
- Fu Weilun as Gu Feiming, Lu Jing's classmate
- Wang Luqing as Qiqi, Lu Jing's classmate
- Li Chang as Zhuguang, Jiayun's assistant
- Yue Yaoli as Lu Jing's grandfather
- Xue Shujie as Lu Jing's grandmother
- Liu Guanlin as He Jia
- Wang Sijie as Xiao Yuke
- Shang Siqi as Xiao Guo, Ma Shanshan's assistant
- Zhou Cheng'ao as Lin Qi, Ma Shanshan's ex-boyfriend
- Du Yuchen as Meng Lanzhi

=== Others ===
- Wang Weihua as Lu Jing's father
- Yu Xiaolei as Lu Jing's mother
- Wang Xin as Liang Chen's father
- Tian Miao as Liang Chen's mother
- Jing Yanjun as Lu Xiangchen, Lu Jing's cousin
- Dai Chao as Yue Yuxun, Liang Chen's ex boyfriend
- Wang Zhimin as Ma Minghui
- Li Ya-nan as CEO Lin
- Guan Jinlin as Zhou Xiaohuan
- Zhou Wentao as Shang Zhi
- Zhu Lala as Liu Shun
- Kang Qixuan as Xiao Pang
- Wang Xiaoyu as A Jie
