= Memory of Encaustic Tile =

Chinese TV series

- Genre: Romance; Coming-of-age
- Directed by: Tian Yu
- Starring: Chen Yuqi; Lin Yi
- Country of origin: China
- Original language: Mandarin
- No. of episodes: 34

Production
- Producer: Miao Meng
- Production location: Hengdian World Studios
- Running time: 45 mins
- Production company: Perfect World Pictures

Original release
- Network: Youku
- Release: January 26 – February 24, 2022

Memory of Encaustic Tile (Chinese: 昔有琉璃瓦; pinyin: Xī Yǒu Liúlíwǎ) is a 2022 Chinese streaming television series based on the novel Glazed Tiles of the Past by Bei Feng San Bai Li. It stars Chen Yuqi and Lin Yi in lead. It aired on Youku from January 26 to February 24, 2022.

The series was filmed in Hengdian World Studios from October 2020 to January 2021.

== Plot ==
The series chronicles the coming-of-age story of childhood friends who have grown up together in Liuli (Chinese: 琉璃; lit. 'Encaustic') Hutong. Shao Xue, Zheng Sunian, Zhang Qi, Lin Shiyin, and Wu Huan are the children of the conservators who work for the Palace Museum. Going through the SARS outbreak, loss of the relative, College Entrance Examination, Beijing Olympics, and the demolition of Hutong, they finally grow up and decide their different futures.

== Cast ==
=== Main ===
- Chen Yuqi as Shao Xue (邵雪). She is a cheerful and lovely girl, and pursues the similar lifestyle as Zheng Sunian's mother.
- Lin Yi as Zheng Sunian (郑素年). He is a warm and quite boy, and one year ahead than other childhood friends in the grade level.
- Yan Zidong as Zhang Qi (张祈). He is a math genius, and has a crush on Shao Xue for years.
- Tian Ai as Lin Shiyin (林诗音). She has a relationship with Sun Kai.
- Sun Kai as Wu Huan (吴欢). He loves Lin Shiyin, but finally breaks up due to the reality.

== Soundtrack ==
Memory of Encaustic Tile Original Soundtrack
No.	Title	Lyrics	Music	Singer	Length
1.	"Green Years (青葱岁月)" (Opening theme song)	Linqiao Ling	Danwu, KimEunji	Huanyu Ning (宁桓宇), Beier Zhao	04:00
2.	"Old Songs (昔日的歌)" (Ending theme song)	Sagel (萨吉)	Dazhou Jin	Ma Di (马頔)	02:49
3.	"You Are My Starry Sky (你是我的星空)" (Relationship Theme Song)	Chang Zhang	Dazhou Jin	Yuning Liu	03:59
