= Xing Fei =

Chinese actress

- Born: Hulunbuir, Inner Mongolia, China
- Other names: Fair Xing; Xiao Fei; Fei Xing
- Education: Shanghai Theatre Academy
- Occupation: Actress
- Years active: 2015–present
- Agents: Mango Pictures; TH Entertainment

Xing Fei (Chinese: 邢菲; pinyin: Xíng fēi), also known as Fair Xing, is a Chinese actress and singer. She is best known for her roles in the dramas Master Devil Do Not Kiss Me (2017), Miracle Healer (2017), Miracle Healer Season 2 (2018), Put Your Head on My Shoulder (2019), Your Highness Class Monitor (2019), Forget You Remember Love (2020), Moon Brightens for you (2020), My Little Happiness (2021), and Miss Crow with Mr. Lizard (2021).

== Early life ==
Fair Xing, also known as Xing Fei, was born in Hulunbuir, Inner Mongolia, China. She graduated from the Shanghai Theatre Academy.

== Career ==
In 2015, Xing became known after appearing in the variety program Grade One Freshman. She then made her acting debut in the campus web drama Campus Basketball Situation, and also featured in the youth sports drama Tornado Girl.

In 2017, Xing played the lead role in the romance comedy series Master Devil Do Not Kiss Me. The web drama was a hit and led to increased recognition for Xing. Xing also played lead roles in web dramas Basketball Fever and The Faded Light Years.

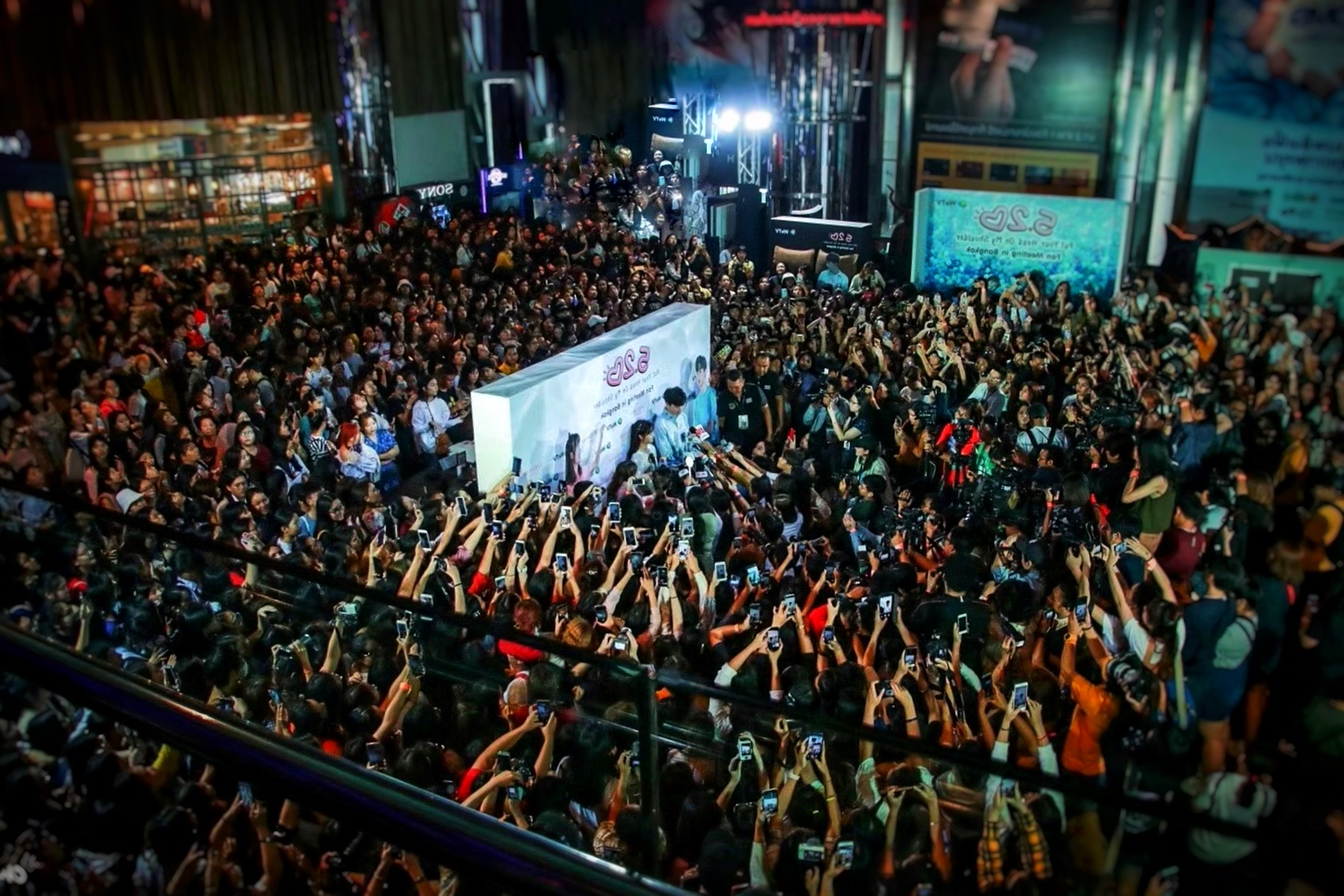
Lin Yi and Xing at the fan meeting in Bangkok on 20 May 2019

In 2019, Xing starred in the romance comedy web drama Put Your Head on My Shoulder, based on the novel of the same name by Zhao Qianqian. The series received positive reviews and had a score of 8.1 on Douban.

In 2020, Xing starred in the romance comedy drama Forget You Remember Love, a remake of the Taiwanese drama The Prince Who Turns into a Frog. In 2021, she starred in the romance drama titled My Little Happiness opposite Tang Xiao Tian, based on the novel by Dong Ben Xi Gu. In the same year, she starred in the romance fantasy drama titled Miss Crow with Mr. Lizard along with Ren Jialun (Allen Ren).

== Filmography ==
=== Film ===
Year	English title	Chinese title	Role	Ref.
2016	Don't Waste Youth	不让青春虚度	Fei Fei	
2019	Ai Xiao Zhong Meng Shi	爱笑种梦师	Lu Xiaohan	
TBA	Trouble in the East China Sea	大闹东海	Yao Guang	

=== Television series ===
Year	English title	Chinese title	Role	Ref.
2016	Campus Basketball Situation	校园篮球风云	Su Xue	
2016	Tornado Girl	旋风少女第二季	An Xiaoyue	
2017	Master Devil Do Not Kiss Me	恶魔少爷别吻我	An Chuxia	
2017	Master Devil Do Not Kiss Me 2	恶魔少爷别吻我2	An Chuxia	
2017	Miracle Healer	超级小郎中	Mo Xiaoyu	
2017	A Chinese Odyssey: Love of Eternity	大话西游之爱你一万年	Tian Xin	
2018	Miracle Healer 2	超级小郎中2	Mo Xiaoyu	
2018	Basketball Fever	热血狂篮	Pei Chenbing	
2018	The Faded Light Years	浪漫星星	Yan Xia	
2019	Put Your Head on My Shoulder	致我们暖暖的小时光	Situ Mo	
2019	Your Highness, The Class Monitor	班长"殿下”	Su Niannian	
2020	Forget You Remember Love	忘记你记得爱情	Ye Qianyu	
2020	The Moon Brightens For You	明月曾照江东寒	Zhan Qinghong	
2021	My Little Happiness	我的小确幸	Cong Rong	
2021	Miss Crow with Mr. Lizard	乌鸦小姐与蜥蜴先生	Jiang Xiaoning	
2022	Hello, the Sharpshooter	你好，神枪手	Tang Xin	
2022	Fei Hu Wai Zhuan	飞狐外传	Cheng Lingsu	
2022	Lost Track of Time	覆流年	Lu An Ran	
2024	Burning Flames (TV series)	烈焰	Bai Cai	
TBA	Yue Zhao Ji	月昭记	Li Chu Yue	
TBA	My Girl	我的女孩	Zhou Xiao Xi	
TBA	Ladys Character	女士的品格	Liu Xiao Xi	
TBA	Wu Geng Ji	武庚纪	Bai Cai	

=== Television show ===
Year	English title	Chinese title	Role	Ref.
2015	Grade One Freshman	一年级大学季	Cast member	

== Discography ==
Year	English title	Chinese title	Album	Notes	Ref.
2015	"My First Grade"	我的一年级	Grade One Freshman OST		
2015	"Freshman"	新生	Grade One Freshman OST		
2017	"I Will Forever Love The Guy Sitting Opposite Me"	我会永远爱坐在我对面的男生	Master Devil Do Not Kiss Me OST		
2018	"Sweet Traces"	甜蜜轨迹	Basketball Fever OST	with Tong Mengshi	

== Awards and nominations ==
Year	Award	Category	Nominated work	Results	Ref.
2016	Mobile Video Festival	Breakthrough Award	—N/a	Won	
2019	26th Huading Awards	Best Actress (Modern drama)	Put Your Head on My Shoulder	Nominated	
2019	Golden Bud – The Fourth Network Film And Television Festival	Best Actress	Put Your Head on My Shoulder, Your Highness The Class Monitor	Nominated	
2019	Golden Bud – The Fourth Network Film And Television Festival	Most Promising Actress	Put Your Head on My Shoulder, Your Highness The Class Monitor	Won	
