= Put Your Head on My Shoulder (TV series) =

Chinese television series

- Promotional Poster

Chinese name
- Simplified Chinese: 致我们暖暖的小时光
Transcriptions
Standard Mandarin
- Hanyu Pinyin: Zhi wo men nuan nuan de xiao shi guang
- Genre: Romantic comedy; Coming-of-age
- Based on: Put Your Head on My Shoulder by Zhao Qianqian
- Written by: Zhao Qianqian
- Directed by: Zhu Dongning
- Starring: Xing Fei; Lin Yi; Tang Xiaotian
- Country of origin: China
- Original language: Mandarin
- No. of seasons: 1
- No. of episodes: 24 + 1 special episode (14 mins)

Production
- Production locations: Ningbo, China; Germany
- Running time: 40 to 45 minutes
- Production companies: Tencent Penguin Pictures; S.JE Ideas Media

Original release
- Network: Tencent
- Release: 10 April – 16 May 2019

Related
- The Love Equations

Put Your Head on My Shoulder (Chinese: 致我们暖暖的小时光; pinyin: Zhi wo men nuan nuan de xiao shi guang) is a Chinese television series starring Xing Fei, Lin Yi, and Tang Xiaotian. The drama is based on Zhao Qianqian's novel of the same name, and was airing from April 10 until May 16, 2019 on Tencent Video, releasing 2 episodes every Wednesday and Thursday evening while VIP members got a 6-episode head start. A Thai Remake of the series, starring Thitipoom Tachaapaikun (New) and Nilawan Iamchuasawad (Kaimuk), was produced under the same name in 2021.

== Synopsis ==
Si Tu Mo (Xing Fei), an accounting student near graduation, who wants to enter an advertising company, is unsure about her future plans. Si Tu Mo likes Fu Pei (Tang Xiaotian), her childhood friend, but is constantly disappointed by his indecisiveness and unreliability. Si Tu Mo, on the other hand, tries out all sorts of things all the time, but is unable to make her own decisions.

Her routine is suddenly shaken up when she meets a physics student, Gu Wei Yi (Lin Yi). While living at the dorm, she is forced by her mother to move into an apartment coincidentally owned by Gu Wei Yi's mother. Unbeknownst to both, their mothers were classmates who thought their two children would make a good match and set them up. Though their relationship starts a little rocky, as they get to know each other, they realize they share more in common than they realized. Before they know it, the matched couple begins to fall in love.

== Cast ==
=== Main ===
- Xing Fei as Si Tu Mo

An accounting student who wants to enter an advertising company.

- Lin Yi as Gu Wei Yi

A physics student who appears in Si Tu Mo's apartment and her love interest

=== Supporting cast ===
- Tang Xiaotian as Fu Pei: Situ Mo's ex-crush and Gu Weiyi's dormmate.
- Zheng Ying Chen as Wang Shan
- Zhou Jun Wei as Lin Zhicun
- Jie Bing as Professor Jiang: Gu Wei Yi's physics mentor
- Zhou Zi Xin as Xie Yuyin
- Gao Yu Fei as Meng Lu
- Zhang Hao Lun as Zhou Lei
- Zhu Kang Li as Ah Ke
- Chen Jing Jing as Hu Niu
- Yi Sha as Xu Jie'er

== Soundtrack ==
No.	Title	Singer	Length
1.	"Warm Little Time (暖暖的小时光)" (Opening Theme Song)	Jin Wen Qi
2.	"For Two (两人份美好)" (Ending Song)	JUNI22 李俊毅
3.	"Have Your Plot (有你的情节)"	Zhou Pin
4.	"Guess (猜一猜)"	He Manting
5.	"Time for a Love Song (一首情歌的时间)"	Yinze Yue (Luna)

== Reception ==
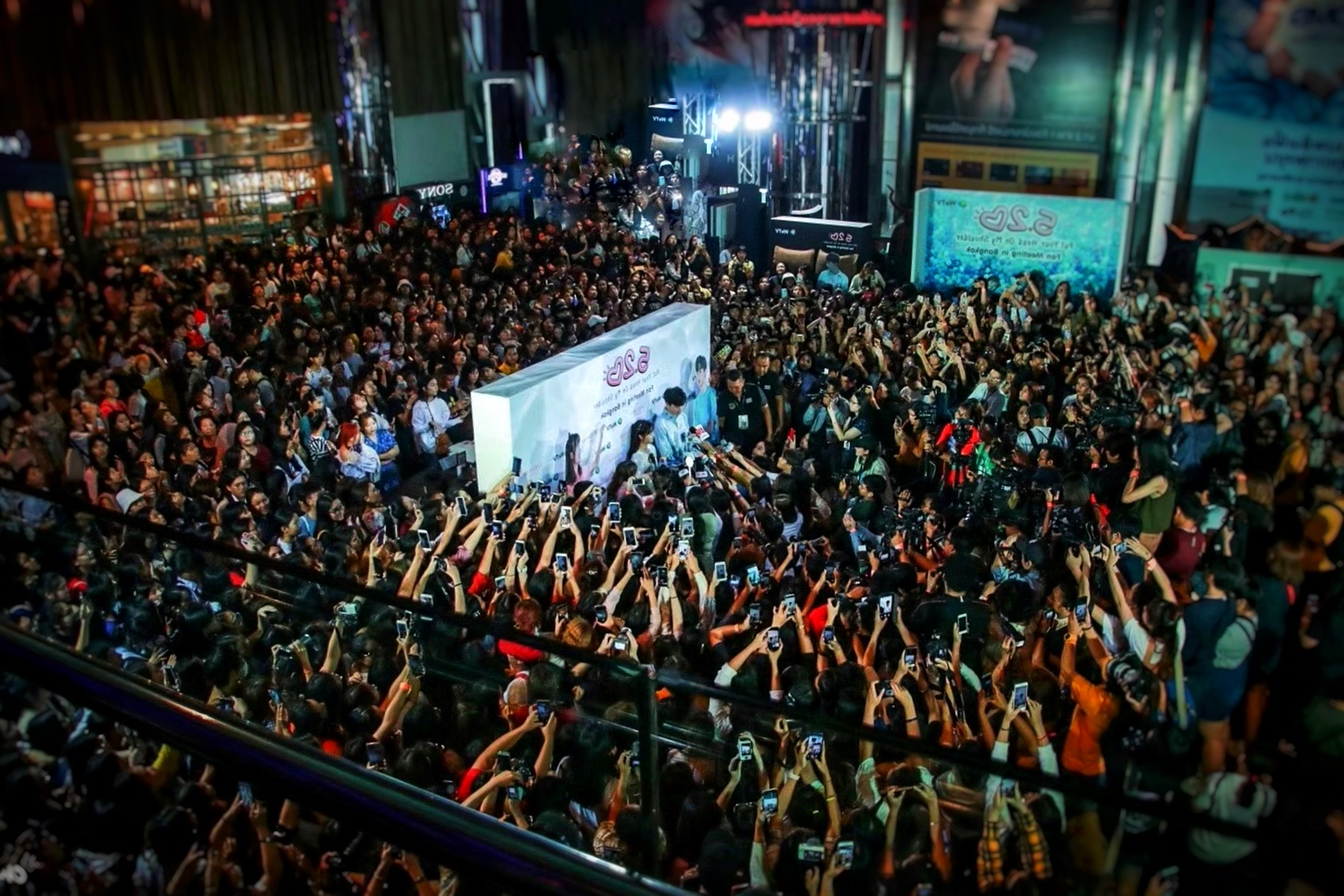
Lin Yi and costar Xing Fei at the fan meeting in Bangkok on May 20, 2019

The series received positive reviews and had a score of 8.1 on Douban. Hotpot.tv ranked it the #5 most romantic drama of 2019. The drama was a success and hit in China and overseas (Thailand) where it achieved a cult following. On May 20, 2019, Lin Yi and costar Xing Fei held a grand fan meeting in Bangkok, Thailand, where a huge crowd of thousands of fans gathered.

== Awards and nominations ==
Award	Category	Nominee	Results	Ref.
26th Huading Awards	Best Screenwriter	Zhao Qianqian, Dai Qi, Liu Yu, Can Xiaoxue, Wu Xueying	Nominated	
26th Huading Awards	Best Actor (Modern drama)	Lin Yi	Nominated	
26th Huading Awards	Best Actress (Modern drama)	Xing Fei	Nominated	
China Entertainment Industry Summit (Golden Pufferfish Awards)	Best Marketing	Put Your Head On My Shoulder	Nominated	
Golden Bud - The Fourth Network Film And Television Festival	Best Web Series	Put Your Head On My Shoulder	Nominated	
Golden Bud - The Fourth Network Film And Television Festival	Top Ten Web Series	Put Your Head On My Shoulder	Won	
Golden Bud - The Fourth Network Film And Television Festival	Producer of the Year	Li Eryun	Won	
Golden Bud - The Fourth Network Film And Television Festival	Best Actress	Xing Fei	Nominated	
Golden Bud - The Fourth Network Film And Television Festival	Most Promising Actress	Xing Fei	Won	
Golden Bud - The Fourth Network Film And Television Festival	Best Newcomer	Lin Yi	Won	
