= My Girlfriend Is an Alien =

Chinese television series

- Promotional poster
- Traditional Chinese: 外星女生柴小七
- Simplified Chinese: 外星女生柴小七
- Hanyu Pinyin: Wài xīng nǚshēng chái xiǎo qī
- Genre: Romantic comedy; Fantasy
- Screenplay by: Dong Ke; Chen Jing
- Directed by: Deng Ke; Gao Zong Kai
- Starring: Wan Peng; Thassapak Hu; Wang You
- Theme music composer: Da Sheng
- Opening theme: "万有引力 (Gravity)"
- Country of origin: China
- Original language: Mandarin
- No. of seasons: 2
- No. of episodes: 58

Production
- Producers: Li Eryun; Zhang Xinyu; Liu Zhimin
- Production location: Shenzhen
- Editor: [ ROCKY ]
- Camera setup: Single-camera
- Running time: 46 minutes
- Production companies: Tencent Penguin Pictures; Zoomlion Transmission

Original release
- Network: Tencent Video
- Release: 19 August 2019 – 16 October 2022

My Girlfriend Is An Alien (Chinese: 外星女生柴小七; pinyin: Wài xīng nǚshēng chái xiǎo qī), is a 2019 Chinese television series starring Wan Peng with Thassapak Hsu. It aired on Tencent Video and WeTV from August 19 to September 24, 2019. The second season aired on Tencent Video and WeTV from September 16, 2022.

== Synopsis ==
The alien girl Chai Xiaoqi from "Cape Town Planet" meets the CEO Fang Leng, who suffers from "heterosexual amnesia on rainy days", accidentally loses her beacon, and is trapped on Earth.

Chai Xiaoqi is not only an alien but also an amazing girl who will fall into a "boy crazy state" once she inhales the hormones emitted by men on Earth.

She experiences all kinds of funny and hilarious encounters, which will perfectly restore the nymphomaniac girl’s psychology of flirting with men for the audience.

In order to survive on the earth, Chai Xiaoqi will also use her various superpowers to solve unexpected trouble one after another.

Fang Leng is a different kind of boss. Once it rains, he will forget the girls who appeared on his side. So he has a variety of hilarious "battles of wits" with the Chai Xiaoqi.

== Cast and characters ==
=== Season 1 ===
Main cast

- Wan Peng as Chai Xiaoqi (An alien who has crash landed on earth. She eventually gains feelings for Fang Leng, and becomes his girlfriend and later wife)
- Thassapak Hsu as Fang Leng (The CEO of the F Group. He eventually gains feelings for Chai Xiaoqi, and becomes her boyfriend,later husband)
- Wang You Jun as Fang Lie (Fang Leng's half brother and Xiaoqi's best friend who has unrequited feelings for her)

Supporting cast

- Yang Yue as Jiang Xue (Heir of Jiang group, and Fang Leng's childhood friend who has unrequited feelings for him)
- Alina Zhang as Sister Chai (Restaurant Owner, Xiaoqi's landlady and friend)
- Wang Hao Zhen as Han Jinming / Assistant Han (Fang Leng's secretary)
- Christopher Lee as Fang Shi Da (Chairman of Future group, Fang Leng and Fang Lie's father)
- Hu Cai Hong as Aunt Zhou (Fang Shi Da's second wife and Fang Lie's mother, Step Mother of Fang Leng )
- Ashin Shu as Doctor Zhang (Fang Leng's therapist and friend)
- Gong Zheng Nan as Ai Lun/Alan (Jiang Xue's ally and a research scientist at Future group)
- Kris Bole as Mr. Filner (Fang Lie's art exhibition sponsor)

=== Season 2 ===
Main cast

- Wan Peng as Chai Xiaoqi
  - Li Xi Yuan as Chai Xiaoqi (young)
- Thassapak Hsu as Fang Leng
  - Ma Chen Yan as Fang Leng (young)

Supporting cast

- Wang You Jun as Fang Lie
- Chen Yi Xin as Xiao Bu
- Zhang Meng as Sister Chai
- Eddie Cheung as Fang Shida
- Wan Yan Luo Rong as Jiang Shiyi
  - Yang Han Bo as Jiang Shiyi (young)
- Zhao Guan Yu as Assistant Han
- Shu Ya Xin as Doctor Zhang
- Hu Cai Hong as Zhou Siqin
- Jia Ze as Chen Mengfei
- Lin Jian Huan as Uncle Kang
- Fu Shou Er as Mrs. Zhou
- Liu Yi as Zhou Dong
- Huang Xiao Ge as Mother Fang
- Sun Zi Jun as Na Na

== Production ==
=== Background ===
Producer Li Eryun said that the play is a small but beautiful, positive energy dream sweet pet love drama, which has both a soft science fiction with a big brain and a love story core that is easily decompressed, and is committed to bringing relaxed joy to the audience At the same time as the romantic innocent story, spread positive positive energy values. The show was officially filmed in Shenzhen on October 20, 2018, ended on January 4, 2019.

=== Opening sequence ===
Thassapak Hsu a.k.a. Fang Leng gets encountered by a car accident and loses his consciousness and suddenly Wan Peng a.k.a. Chai Xiaoqi lands on the Earth in front of him and helps him to recover his consciousness suddenly the car due to crash explodes and she tries to protect Fang Leng from the destruction meanwhile her Annunciator (a precious stone from her home planet) gets penetrated through the body of Fang Leng inside his heart. After that, Chai Xiaoqi takes shelter in a restaurant owned by Alina Zhang a.k.a. Sister Chai and eventually gets appointed at Future Group of Companies by the president of the company Fang Leng.

=== Setting ===
The shooting for the show took place in Shenzhen on October 20, 2018 and ended on January 4, 2019.

== Soundtracks ==
No.	Title	Lyrics	Composer(s)	Singer(s)	Length	Notes
1	"Gravity (万有引力)"	Sherry Li Zen Yu & Li Lingyao	Da Sheng	Li Zi Xuan	03:06	Opening theme
2	"Since I Met You (自从我遇见你)"	Zhou Jieying	Xiao Qiao	Ren Ran	03:42	Ending theme
3	"Love Does Not Leave (爱不离开)"	Lin Qiao & Jin XiaoK	Cen Si Yuan	Zhou Fu Jian	03:51	
4	"Of Course Love (爱所当然)"	Lin Qiao & Liu Enxun	Zhang Hong	Xu Zaxang/ Bie	03:47	
5	"Rotary Planet (旋转星球)"	Li Yuzhe	Quan Gui Li	Zeng Yu Ming	03:41	
6	"In a Dream (在梦中)"	Cissy	Cissy	Jiang Ping Guo	02:49	
7	"Ambiguous Fermentation (暧昧发酵)"	Zhang Pengpeng	Zhang Pengpeng	Lian Huai Wei	03:44	

== Awards and nominations ==
Year	Award	Category	Nominee	Result	Reference
2019	Tencent Video All Star Awards	Most Promising Television Actor	Wan Peng	Won	
