= Unge lovende =

Norwegian television series

- Genre: Dramedy
- Created by: Siri Seljeseth
- Starring: Siri Seljeseth; Gine Cornelia Pedersen; Alexandra Gjerpen
- Country of origin: Norway
- Original language: Norwegian
- No. of seasons: 4

Production
- Executive producer: Nina-Kristine Lohre
- Producer: Maren K. Onsaker
- Running time: 30 minutes

Original release
- Network: NRK1
- Release: November 14, 2015

Unge lovende (English: Young and Promising) is a Norwegian dramedy that aired for 4 seasons on NRK1. The plot follows three twenty-something Norwegian women; it has been called the Norwegian Girls. It has won several professional awards at the Gullruten. Its British TV rights are owned by Channel 4 and Australian by SBS.
