= Beijing Institute of Fashion Technology =

Municipal public college in Beijing, China

Coordinates: 39.9745°N 116.4306°E

- Other names: BIFT
- Motto: 严谨﹑勤奋﹑求实﹑创新
- Motto in English: Meticulousness, diligence, faithfulness, creativity
- Type: Public
- Established: 1959; 67 years ago
- President: Liu Yuanfeng
- Undergraduates: 6017
- Postgraduates: 481
- Location: Beijing, China
- Campus: Urban, 2 Campus
- Website: www.bift.edu.cn

The Beijing Institute of Fashion Technology (Chinese: 北京服装学院; lit. 'Beijing Fashion College') is a municipal public college in Chaoyang, Beijing, China.
