= Tencent Video =

Chinese video streaming website

- Logo used since 2023
- Available in: Mandarin, English, Thai, Indonesian, Hindi, Japanese, Korean, Portuguese, Spanish, Arabic, Vietnamese (all languages other than Mandarin are WeTV only)
- Industry: Entertainment
- Products: Streaming media Video on demand
- Parent: Tencent
- Website: v.qq.com wetv.vip/en (WeTV)

Tencent Video (Chinese: 腾讯视频; pinyin: Téngxùn Shìpín, also called WeTV outside of China) is a Chinese video streaming website owned by Tencent, launched in April 2011. As of October 2022, Tencent Video has 120 million paid subscribers, making it the 4th largest streaming service in the world, after Netflix, Amazon Prime Video, and Disney+. Tencent Video also operates an international version, WeTV, which was launched in 2018.

Tencent Video supports online video on demand, television broadcasts, and in July 2017 began featuring video content on TCL Corporation, China's biggest television maker.

== History ==
Tencent Video launched with an independent domain in April 2011; the Tencent Video documentary channel was launched in June. By August 2012, Tencent Video had reached 200 million daily average broadcasts.

On 27 April 2013, Tencent Video reached an agreement with six major production companies: BBC Worldwide, ITV Studios, Fremantle Media, All3Media International, and Endemol, and shortly after launched its first British TV channel was launched, China's first British drama broadcast platform.

On 27 April 2022, Disney China announced that 迪家影视俱乐部 (literal translation Disney's Home of Film and Television Club) would be launched on Tencent Video, providing Disney's movies, children's animation series and documentaries including selected Disney+ Original films.

In 2023, Tencent Video launched a new version of its logo, and collaborated with the Douyin Group in the same year.

== Usage ==
In October 2017, Tencent Video's revenue was CNY 65.2 billion (US$9.87 billion). In September 2017, Tencent Video was one of eight Chinese apps in the top 30 mobile apps with the largest revenue in the App Store and Google Play Stores. In October 2017, Tencent Video ranked among the top 15 apps with the largest global consolidated monthly income with Tencent Video ranked top in revenue of iOS entertainment applications in China in October 2017.

== Censorship ==
Tencent's relationship with the Chinese government has attracted controversy, as content produced or distributed by the platform is subject to censorship with high levels of surveillance.

== See also ==
- List of Tencent Video original programming
- iflix
- Showmax
