= List of Chinese actors =

The following is a list of notable Chinese-speaking/writing actors. Their nationality can be PRC (mainland China, Hong Kong, Macau), Taiwan or any other country. This list does not include actresses.

== A ==
- Arthur Chen
- Ao Ruipeng

== B ==
- Bai Jingting
- Bai Yu
- Bi Wenjun

== C ==
- William Chan
- Jackie Chan
- Sunny Chan
- Chang Huasen
- Chen Baoguo
- Chen Daoming
- Calvin Chen
- Edison Chen
- Chen Heyi
- Jaycee Chan
- Kelly Chen
- Chen Xiao
- Chen Xingxu
- Chen Xinhai
- Chen Xuedong
- Chen Zheyuan
- Ekin Cheng
- Joe Cheng
- Cheng Lei
- Cheng Yi
- Leslie Cheung
- David Chiang
- Chin Han
- Jay Chou
- Stephen Chow
- Chow Yun-fat
- Wu Chun

== D ==
- Deng Kai
- Deng Chao
- Deng Lun
- Deng Wei
- Darren Chen
- Dylan Wang
- Ding Yuxi
- Deng Xiaoci
- Dai Gaozheng

== F ==
- Fan Chengcheng
- Fan Zhixin
- Feng Enhe

== G ==
- Ge You
- Guo Junchen
- Gong Jun
- Gao Weiguang

== H ==
- Mike He
- He Yu
- Huang Xiao Ming
- Huang Zitao
- Hu Ge
- Hu Jun
- Hu Yanbin
- Hu Yitian
- Wallace Huo
- Huang Junjie
- Hou Minghao

== J ==
- Jet Li
- Josie Ho
- Jia Hongsheng
- Sammo Hung
- Tao Jin

== K ==
- Ella Koon
- Rosamund Kwan
- Shirley Kwan
- Kenix Kwok
- Kris Wu

== L ==
- Michael Lam
- Raymond Lam
- Luo Yunxi
- Liu Yuning
- Leon Lai
- Andy Lau
- Hawick Lau
- Bruce Lee
- Brandon Lee
- Aarif Lee
- Leo Luo
- Ken Leung
- Tony Leung Chiu Wai
- Jet Li
- Li Xian
- Li Yifeng
- Lin Yi
- Jimmy Lin
- Bernice Liu
- Liu Haoran
- Tao Liu
- Liu Ye
- Gallen Lo
- Zihan Loo
- Lu Han
- Li Hongyi
- Leo Wu
- Lai Weiming
- Li Yunrui
- Liang Yongqi

== M ==
- Ma Ke
- Karen Mok
- Anita Mui
- Ma Tianyu
- Hou Minghao

== N ==
- Neo Hou
- Kary Ng
- Richard Ng Man Tat
- Sandra Ng
- Rachel Ngan

== P ==
- Eddie Peng
- Will Pan
- Pan Yueming
- Byron Pang
- Diana Pang
- Jenny Pat

== Q ==
- Qin Hao
- Quan Yilun

== R ==
- Ren Jialun
- Selina Ren
- Michelle Reis
- Riley Wang
- Ruan Lingyu, silent-film actress

== S ==
- Charmaine Sheh
- Xiao Shenyang
- Shu Qi
- Fiona Sit
- Maggie Siu
- Alec Su
- Betty Sun
- Song Weilong

== T ==
- Tan Jianci
- Hebe Tian
- Leila Tong
- Tang Guoqiang
- Tang Xiaotian
- Stephy Tang
- Nicholas Tse
- Angela Tong
- Tian Jiarui

== V ==
- Vin Zhang

== W ==
- Jiro Wang
- Wang Gang
- Wang Baoqiang (王宝强, Vương Bảo Cường)
- Wang Anyu
- Wang Hongyi
- Wang Xingyue
- Wang Yibo
- Wang Ziqi
- Wei Daxun
- Bosco Wong
- Race Wong
- Chun Wu
- Daniel Wu
- Wu Yifan
- Wei Zheming

== X ==
- Xu Zheng
- Xu Shaohua
- Xiong Ziqi
- Xu Kai
- Xiao Zhan
- Xing Zhao Lin
- Xu Zhenxuan
- Xia Zhiguang

== Y ==
- Aaron Yan
- Jerry Yan
- Donnie Yen Ji Dan
- Shawn Yue
- Yuen Biao
- Yang Yang
- Jackson Yee
- Yan An
- Yu Chengen

== Z ==
- Joseph Zeng
- Dan Zhao
- Zhang Fengyi
- Zhang Guoli
- Zhang Han
- Zhang Jie
- Zhang Linghe
- Tielin Zhang
- Jacky Cheung
- Zhang Yimou
- Zhang Yixing
- Zhang Yunlong
- Junli Zheng
- Vic Zhou
- Ken Zhu
- Zhu Yawen
- Zhang Ruoyun
- Zhang Yi
- Zhou Yiran
- Zhu Yilong
- Zhu Zanjin
- Zhu Zhengting
- Zuo Ye
- Zhang Kangle
- Zi Yu

== See also ==
- List of Chinese actresses
