= Lin Ziye =

Chinese child actor (born 2011)

- Born: May 4, 2011 (age 15); Fujian, China
- Other name: Lester Lin
- Occupation: Actor
- Years active: 2021–present
- Agent: Super Up

Chinese name
- Simplified Chinese: 林子燁
- Hanyu Pinyin: Lín Zǐyè

Lin Ziye (Chinese: 林子烨, born May 4, 2011), also known as Lester Lin, is a Chinese actor. He gained popularity for portraying the roles of Xue Chongzi in My Journey to You (2023) and Bai Jiu in Fangs of Fortune (2024).

== Discography ==
=== Soundtrack appearances ===
Year	Title	Album
2024	"Little Verse" (小诗句) (with Hou Minghao, Chen Duling, Tian Jiarui, Cheng Xiao, Xu Zhenxuan, Yan An, and Lai Weiming)	Fangs of Fortune OST
2024	"Broken Tail Bird" (断尾鸟) (with Tian Jiarui)	Fangs of Fortune OST

== Filmography ==
=== Television series ===
Year	Title		Role	Notes
Year	English	Chinese	Role	Notes
2021	Jun Jiu Ling	君九龄	Chu Jiurong	
2022	Perfect Couple	完美伴侣	Lin Jing	
2022	The Heart of Genius	天才基本法	young Pei Zhi	
2022	Our Times	我们这十年	An Di	Segment: "Persistence"
2023	Enlighten Your Life	许你万家灯火	young Lin Qi	
2023	Imperfect Victim	不完美受害人	Xuan Xuan	
2023	My Journey to You	云之羽	Xue Chongzi	
2023	A Journey to Love	一念关山	Ning Shisan	Cameo (Ep. 40)
2024	Fangs of Fortune	大梦归离	Bai Jiu	
2026	The Ingenious One 2	云襄传之将进酒	Yuliang Pianpian	
2026	Blossoms of Power	百花杀	Tian Yuan	
TBA	Immortality	皓衣行	Xia Sini / child Chu Wanning	
TBA	Let's Fight	来战	Demon	Cameo
TBA	Wanhua Sin	万花世界		
