= Tian Jiarui =

Chinese actor

- 田嘉瑞
- Born: December 4, 1998 (age 27); Liaocheng, Shandong, China
- Education: Donghua University – Performance Department
- Occupation: Actor
- Years active: 2023–present
- Agent: Tian Jiarui Studio
- Height: 184 cm (6 ft 0 in)
- Website: Tian Jiarui's Weibo

Tian Jiarui (Chinese: 田嘉瑞, born December 4, 1998 in Liaocheng, China), also known as Jerry Tian, is a Chinese actor and singer. He gained recognition for playing the roles of Gong Yuanzhi in My Journey to You (2023) and Zhuo Yichen in Fangs of Fortune (2024).

== Early life ==
Tian was born on December 4, 1998, in Liaocheng, Shandong, China. He had developed an early interest in the performing arts. During elementary school, he was a member of a school band and learned to play the guitar. In 2015, he won first prize in the Shandong Province High School Speech Competition while attending Liaocheng No. 3 High School. He graduated from high school in 2016 and was subsequently admitted to the Performance Department of Donghua University.

== Career ==
=== 2023–present: Acting debut ===
In January 2023, Tian Jiarui signed a contract with ZUI to become an artist under director Guo Jingming Company.

On June 5 of the same year, Tian Jiarui began filming costume drama Take Me Where the Clouds Rise. On September 2, the action espionage drama My Journey to You was broadcast on iQIYI. He played Gong Yuanzhi, the third Gong family young master, excelling in using poison, and making hidden weapons. On October 1, Tian joined the cast of Fangs of Fortune, where he played the roles of Zhuo Yichen and Lord Bing Yi. The series was broadcast on 26 October 2024 on iQIYI. In 2026, Tian starred in Veil of Shadows along with actress Ju Jingyi. He plays Ji Ling, a seemingly endearing character who was hiding multiple complex, secret identities linked to an ancient power.

== Filmography ==
=== Television series ===
Year	Title		Role	Network	Ref.
Year	English	Chinese	Role	Network	Ref.
2023	My Journey to You	云之羽	Gong Yuanzhi	iQIYI	
2024	Fangs of Fortune	大梦归离	Zhuo Yichen / Lord Bing Yi	iQIYI	
2026	Veil of Shadows	月鳞绮纪	Ji Ling / Man Man / Dragon Deity / Ji Can	Youku	
2026	The Legend of Rosy Clouds	云秀行	Yan Jiang	iQIYI	
2026	See You Later...Maybe	囧徒之预演告别	Bie Fan	Tencent Video	
TBA	Burning Night	燃霜为昼	Leng Wensheng / Bai Zhou	Youku	
TBA	Yīlù Cànlàn	一路灿烂	Li Sibo	iQIYI	

== Discography ==
=== Singles ===
Year	English Title	Chinese Title	Album	Notes/Ref
2023	"Singer"	歌者	My Journey to You OST	Gong Yuanzhi's theme song
2024	"Little Verse"	小诗句	Fangs of Fortune OST	with Hou Minghao, Chen Duling, Cheng Xiao, Lin Ziye, Xu Zhenxuan, Yan An & Lai Weiming
2024	"Don't Miss Don't Think"	不念不想	Fangs of Fortune OST	Zhuo Yichen's theme song
2024	"Broken Tail Bird"	断尾鸟	Fangs of Fortune OST	Zhuo Yichen & Bai Jiu's theme song
2026	"Innocent as a Fox"	赤子如狐	Veil of Shadows OST	Ji Ling's theme song
2026	"Not Suffering"	不苦	Veil of Shadows OST	Ji Ling & Lu Wuyi's theme song
2026	"Mind's Gaze"	心眸	The Legend of Rosy Clouds OST	
2026	"Blue Dwarf"	蓝矮星	Lan Aixing	Third Debut Anniversary Single

== Awards and Nominations ==
Year	Award	Category	Nominee(s)/Work(s)	Result	Ref.
2023	Wenrong Awards	Potential Actor of the Year	Tian Jiarui	Won	
2024	iQIYI Scream Night	Top 10 Actor of the Year	Tian Jiarui	Won	
