= Xu Zhenxuan =

Chinese actor (born 2002)

- Born: February 25, 2002 (age 24); Wenzhou, Zhejiang, China
- Education: National Academy of Chinese Theatre Arts
- Occupation: Actor
- Years active: 2020–present
- Agent: Bigear

Chinese name
- Simplified Chinese: 徐振轩
- Hanyu Pinyin: Xú Zhènxuān

Xu Zhenxuan (Chinese: 徐振轩; pinyin: Xú Zhènxuān, born February 25, 2002) is a Chinese actor. He gained popularity for his role as Liu Suifeng in The Journey of Legend (2025). He is also known for his roles in Fangs of Fortune (2024) and Time Raiders (2025).

== Discography ==
=== Soundtrack appearances ===
Year	Title	Album
2024	"Little Verse" (小诗句) (with Hou Minghao, Chen Duling, Tian Jiarui, Cheng Xiao, Yan An, Lin Ziye and Lai Weiming)	Fangs of Fortune OST
2024	"Heroes Aren't Upright" (英雄不磊落)	Fangs of Fortune OST

== Filmography ==
=== Television series ===
Year	Title	Role	Notes	Ref.
2023	My Lady General	Gu Mingzhu / Jiang Juan		
2024	Adventure Behind the Bronze Door	young Wu Xie		
2024	Fangs of Fortune	Ying Lei		
2025	The Journey of Legend	Liu Suifeng		
2025	Time Raiders	Wu Xie		
2026	Overdo	Li Baize		
2026	Spring of the Blade	Li Congxin		
TBA	Southern Anecdote	Wu Xie		
TBA	Kun Lun	Xiao Lang	Cameo	
TBA	The Great Nobody 2	Bai Longma		
TBA	The Mystic Nine against the Coming Storm	Wu Xie	Cameo	
TBA	Immortalis	Zhou Huai		

=== Television shows ===
Year	Title	Role	Notes	Ref.
2020	We Are Young	Contestant		

== Awards and nominations ==
Year	Award	Category	Nominee(s)/Work(s)	Result	Ref.
2025	Weibo TV & Internet Video Summit	Emerging Actor of the Year	Xu Zhenxuan	Won	
