= Lai Weiming =

Chinese actor (born 2001)

- Born: September 7, 2001 (age 25); Ningde, Fujian, China
- Occupation: Actor
- Years active: 2022–present
- Agent: Lemon Blue Media

Chinese name
- Simplified Chinese: 赖伟明
- Hanyu Pinyin: Lài Wěimíng

Lai Weiming (Chinese: 赖伟明, born September 7, 2001) is a Chinese actor. He is best known for his roles as Pei Siheng in Fangs of Fortune (2024) and Zhuang Xu in Shine on Me (2025).

== Discography ==
=== Soundtrack appearances ===
Year	Title	Album
2024	"Little Verse" (小诗句) (with Hou Minghao, Chen Duling, Tian Jiarui, Cheng Xiao, Xu Zhenxuan, Yan An, and Lin Ziye)	Fangs of Fortune OST
2024	"Accompany Me" (半我) (with Cheng Xiao)	Fangs of Fortune OST

== Filmography ==
=== Television series ===
Year	Title		Role	Network	Ref.
Year	English	Chinese	Role	Network	Ref.
2023	When I Fly Towards You	当我飞奔向你	Wen Lang	Youku	
2024	Everyone Loves Me	别对我动心	Hou Liang	Youku	
2024	Fangs of Fortune	大梦归离	Pei Siheng	iQIYI	
2025	Reopen My Journals	致1999年的自己	Lu Yao	Tencent Video	
2025	Reborn	焕羽	Ma Mingkai	Tencent Video	
2025	Moonlit Reunion	子夜归	Ling Xiao	Tencent Video	
2025	Shine on Me	骄阳似我	Zhuang Xu	Tencent Video	
2026	Glaze of Love	我在大学修文物	Xu Xiao	iQIYI	
2026	Blossoms of Power	百花杀	Xiao Changying	Tencent Video	
2026	Genius Girlfriend	天才女友	Shen Fuxuan	iQIYI	
2026	Taming the Husband	宝珠	Xie Yan	Mango TV	
TBA	Wanhua Sin	万花世界		Tencent Video	

== Awards and nominations ==
Year	Award	Category	Nominee(s)/Work(s)	Result	Ref.
2025	Tencent Video Star Awards	Best Newcomer in a Television Series	Lai Weiming	Won	
