= Blossoms of Power =

2026 Chinese television series

- Promotional poster
- Genre: Historical; Romance
- Based on: Wo Hua Kai Hou Bai Hua Sha by Jin Huang
- Written by: Jin Huang
- Directed by: Zhong Qing; Guo Feng
- Starring: He Yu; Meng Ziyi
- Country of origin: China
- Original language: Mandarin
- No. of episodes: 36

Production
- Running time: 45 minutes
- Production companies: Tencent Video; Youhug Media

Original release
- Network: Tencent Video
- Release: 9 July – 26 July 2026

Blossoms of Power (Chinese: 百花杀; pinyin: Bǎi Huā Shā) is a 2026 Chinese television series starring He Yu and Meng Ziyi. Based on the web novel of the same name by Jin Huang, the series follows the turbulent romance between the two main protagonists as they navigate the dangerous political intrigues and power struggles within the imperial court. It began airing on Tencent Video on July 9, 2026. It marks the third on-screen collaboration between the two leads, following Blossom and The Legend of Heroes: Hot Blooded.

== Synopsis ==
Gu Qingzhi, the sole survivor of a massacre that wipes out her entire family, awakens under a new identity as Shen Xihe, Princess of the Northwest. Once a spirited and courageous border princess, she transforms into a cold, calculating strategist determined to reclaim her destiny and avenge her family. At the imperial court, she crosses paths with Crown Prince Xiao Huayong, who appears physically frail but conceals a razor-sharp mind and quietly manipulates the political landscape. What begins as a relationship of mutual exploitation for personal gain gradually evolves into trust and alliance, as the two join forces to navigate palace conspiracies, protect the kingdom, and confront the forces that destroyed Shen Xihe's family.

== Cast ==
Main cast

- He Yu as Xiao Huayong

The Crown Prince, physically frail but intellectually formidable, who conceals his true strength and influence over the court.

- Meng Ziyi as Shen Xihe / Gu Qingzhi

A border princess who assumes a new identity after surviving her family's massacre and seeks revenge against those responsible.

Supporting cast

- Kong Xueer as Li Yanhui/Princess Consort Ding
- Jiang Yixuan as Mo Yu
- Chen Heyi as Xiao Changyu
- Lin Ziye as Tian Yuan
- Fan Shuaiqi as Bu Shulin
- Jeremy Tsui as Xiao Changqing
- Cao Yangmingzhu as Zhenzhu
- Lai Weiming as Xiao Changying

== Production ==
The series was produced by Tencent Video and Youhug Media. It was directed by Zhong Qing, who previously directed In Blossom (2024), with Guo Feng serving as co-director. The series is based on the web novel Wo Hua Kai Hou Bai Hua Sha (我花开后百花杀) by Jin Huang. Principal photography took place between April and August 2025.

== Broadcast ==
Blossoms of Power premiered on Tencent Video on July 9, 2026, airing daily episodes. The series comprises 36 episodes + 1 special episode, each approximately 45 minutes long, and international streaming rights, including English subtitles, were acquired by Disney for select markets.

== Original Soundtrack ==
Blossoms of Power OST (白花杀 影视原声带)
No.	Title	Lyrics	Music	Singer	Length
1.	"Bustling Mortal World [红尘慌慌]" (Theme / Ending)	Duan Sisi	Tan Xuan	Zhou Shen	4:33
2.	"Wind Within My Sleeve" (袖里长风)	Duan Sisi	Tan Xuan	Zhang Yuan	4:40
3.	"Flower Shadows" (花影)	Duan Sisi	Tan Xuan	Curley Gao	5:12
4.	"Inverted River" (倒悬之河)	Duan Sisi	Tan Xuan	Xu Junshuo, 阿YueYue	4:50
5.	"Wind and Flowers" (风与花)	Duan Sisi	Tan Xuan	He Yu	4:25
