= Yan An (entertainer) =

Chinese actor and singer (born 1996)

- 闫桉
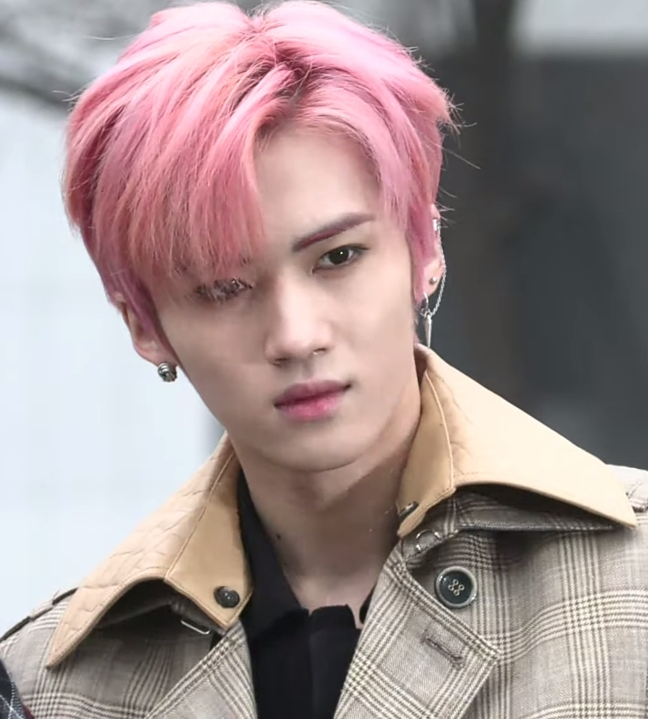
- Yan in April 2019
- Born: October 25, 1996 (age 30); Hokkaido, Japan
- Occupations: Singer; actor
- Years active: 2016–present
- Agents: Yan An Studio; Super Up
- Musical career
- Genres: K-pop; Mandopop
- Instruments: Vocals; piano
- Label: Cube Entertainment; (2016–2023)
- Formerly of: Pentagon

Chinese name
- Simplified Chinese: 闫桉
- Hanyu Pinyin: Yán Ān

Yan An (Chinese: 闫桉; Korean: 옌안; born October 25, 1996), is a Chinese actor and singer. He debuted as a vocalist of the South Korean boy group Pentagon in October 2016. In addition to his musical activities, he made his acting debut in the Chinese drama Use for My Talent (2021). He is best known for his role as Li Lun in Fangs of Fortune (2024).

== Early life and education ==
Yan An was born on October 25, 1996, in Hokkaido, Japan, and was raised in Shanghai, China. His father is a musician from Shanghai, and his mother is a pipa player from Beijing. He graduated from Shanghai Donghui Vocational and Technical School.

== Career ==
=== Pre-debut ===
Yan passed "Cube Star World Audition" overseas selection and became Cube trainee in 2014.

=== 2016–present: Debut with Pentagon, departure from Cube, solo activities, acting career and departure from Pentagon ===
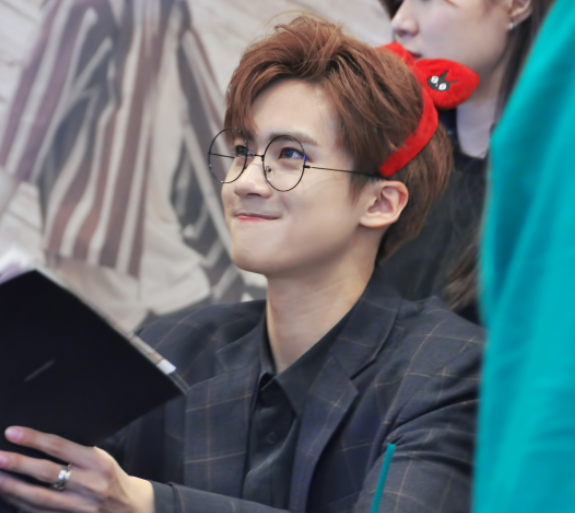
Yan at a fansign event in September 2017

Yan debuted on July 10, 2016, with the group Pentagon under Cube Entertainment as a vocalist and dancer. The group was formed through a variety show called Pentagon Maker. Despite Yan An being eliminated from the program, he was added to the group's final lineup alongside E'Dawn and Shinwon.

On July 22, 2019, Cube Entertainment announced that Yan would not be able to participate in Pentagon's 2019 world tour, "Prism", for medical reasons. He returned to the group on September 17, 2020, officially ending his 440-day hiatus. He actively promoted with the group before going into a hiatus again on February 21, 2022. As of October 2023, he has yet to return and no further statement regarding his future in the group has been made. On October 9, 2023, it was announced that he had left Cube Entertainment alongside fellow Pentagon members Yeo One, Kino, Yuto, and Wooseok. It was also announced that the group would not be disbanding.

In 2018, Yan participated in the Chinese reality television show Chao Yin Zhan Ji as a contestant.

Yan officially made his acting debut in the 2021 Chinese television series Use for My Talent where he played the role of Shi Junjie.

In April 2023, he participated in television show Youth π Project. In October, he joined the cast of Fangs of Fortune where he portrayed the role of the antagonist Li Lun. The series was broadcast on October 26, 2024 on iQIYI.

In March 2024, Yan joined the cast of Hidden Shadow alongside Li Hongyi and Wang Churan where he played the role of Hua Rongjian. The filming of the drama began in March and finished in June of the same year. In December, it was announced that Yan An had joined the cast of Veil of Shadows. The booting ceremony of the drama was held on December 2.

In December 2025, Yan was cast opposite Tian Xiwei in the drama Where the Mask Ends, marking his first leading role as Lu Zhuo.

On July 21, 2026, Cube Entertainment announced the departure of Yan An and Yuto from Pentagon, and that the group would continue its activities with 7 members.

== Discography ==
=== Singles ===
| Title | Year | Album |
As lead artist
| "Tears are Dreams Made by Water" (泪是水做的梦) | 2025 | Non-album singles |
| "Four Seasons" (四季) | 2025 | Non-album singles |
| "U" | 2025 | Non-album singles |
| "Used to Be" | 2025 | Non-album singles |
| "Wild Heart" | 2026 | Non-album singles |
| "Floating" | 2026 | Non-album singles |
Collaborations
| "You Are" (with Hui, Hongseok, Shinwon, Yeo One, Jinho, Kino) | 2016 | Pentagon |

=== Soundtrack appearances ===
| Title | Year | Peak chart positions | Album |
| Title | Year | CHN | Album |
|---|---|---|---|
| "Little Verse" (小诗句) (with Hou Minghao, Chen Duling, Tian Jiarui, Cheng Xiao, Lin Ziye, Xu Zhenxuan & Lai Weiming) | 2024 | 63 | Fangs of Fortune OST |
| "The World is Without Boundaries" (天地无仑) | 2024 | — | Fangs of Fortune OST |

=== Writing and production credits ===
| Year | Artist | Song | Album | Lyrics | | Music | |
| Year | Artist | Song | Album | Credited | With | Credited | With |
|---|---|---|---|---|---|---|---|
| 2016 | Pentagon | "Up" | Non-album release | No | —N/a | Yes | Yeo One, Shinwon, Jinho, Wooseok |
| 2019 | Pentagon | "Round 1" (Bonus track) | Genie:us | Yes | Hui, Jinho, Shinwon, Yeo One, Hongseok, Yuto, Kino, Wooseok | Yes | Hui, Jinho, Shinwon, Yeo One, Hongseok, Yuto, Kino, Wooseok, MosPick |
| 2019 | Pentagon | "Round 2" (Bonus track) | Sum(me:r) | Yes | Hui, Jinho, Shinwon, Yeo One, Hongseok, Yuto, Kino, Wooseok | Yes | Hui, Jinho, Shinwon, Yeo One, Hongseok, Yuto, Kino, Wooseok, MosPick |

== Filmography ==
=== Television series ===
| Year | Title | Role | Ref. |
|---|---|---|---|
| 2021 | Use for My Talent | Shi Junjie | |
| 2024 | Fangs of Fortune | Li Lun | |
| 2026 | Veil of Shadows | Li Jie / Yuan Wuhuo | |
| 2026 | Where the Mask Ends | Lu Zhuo | |
| TBA | Hidden Shadow | Hua Rongjian | |
| TBA | Jin Zhao Wan Nian Chang | Shen Kou | |
| TBA | Bai Yao Pu | God of Thunder | |

=== Television shows ===
| Year | Title | Role | Ref. |
|---|---|---|---|
| 2016 | Pentagon Maker | Contestant | |
| 2018 | Chao Yin Zhan Ji | Contestant | |
| 2023 | Youth π Project | Contestant | |
| 2023 | Hit It Off | Cast member | |
| 2025 | Sunshine Market | Cast member | |

== Awards and nominations ==
| Year | Award | Category | Nominee(s)/Work(s) | Result | Ref. |
|---|---|---|---|---|---|
| 2024 | Wenrong Awards | Potential Actor of the Year | Yan An | Won | |
| 2024 | iQIYI Scream Night | New Actor of the Year | Yan An | Won | |
| 2024 | Weibo Music Awards | Song of the Year | "The World is Without Boundaries" (天地无仑) | Nominated | |
