= Yanan =

Yanan may refer to:

- Yan'an, Chinese city in Shaanxi province, which was the Communist Party's capital from 1936 to 1948
- Yanan language, or Yana language, extinct language formerly spoken in north-central California
- Yan An (born 1996), Chinese singer and actor, member of Pentagon
