= My Journey to You =

2023 Chinese television series

- Promotional poster
- 云之羽
- Genre: Wuxia; Romance
- Written by: Gu Xiaosheng; Wu Liang; Wu Lizhu; Li Qiong; Liu Maijia
- Directed by: Gu Xiaosheng
- Starring: Yu Shuxin; Zhang Linghe
- Country of origin: China
- Original language: Mandarin
- No. of episodes: 24

Production
- Cinematography: Hengdian World Studios
- Running time: ≈70 minutes per episode
- Production company: iQIYI

Original release
- Release: September 2 – September 15, 2023

My Journey to You (云之羽) is a 2023 Chinese wuxia romance television series directed and written by Gu Xiaosheng, starring Yu Shuxin and Zhang Linghe as the leading roles. The series aired on iQIYI with 24 episodes on September 2, 2023.

== Synopsis ==
It tells the story of Yun Weishan, an assassin of Wufeng who infiltrates the Gong residence to fulfill her mission and the young master of Gong family, Gong Ziyu who suddenly becomes the head of the family due to an unfortunate event. As time goes by, the two of them become deeply involved with each other.

== Cast and characters ==
=== Main ===
- Yu Shuxin as Yun Weishan

An assassin of Wufeng who was sent to Gong residence.

- Zhang Linghe as Gong Ziyu

Young master of Gong family's Yu lineage who becomes the head of the family in one night due to his father and older brother's death.

=== Main Supporting ===
- Ryan Cheng as Gong Shangjue

Head of Gong family's Jue lineage who wants to become the head of Gong family and remove Gong Ziyu from power.

- Lu Yuxiao as Shangguan Qian

A Wufeng assassin who was sent to Gong residence.

=== Supporting ===
- Tian Jiarui as Gong Yuanzhi
- Jin Jing as Gong Zishang
- Sun Chenjun as Jin Fan
- Wen Zhengrong as Ming Wuji
- Ji Lingchen as Gong Huanyu
- Lin Ziye as Xue Tongzi
  - Zeng Shunxi as Xue Tongzi (adult)
- Zuo Ye as Young master Yue
- Liang Xuefang as Young master Hua
- Ren Shan as Gong Hongyu
- Shen Baoping as Elder Yue
- Ding Zhiyong as Elder Hua
- Tan Jianchang as Elder Xue
- Chen Duling as Madame Lan, Gong Ziyu's biological mother
- Yao Tong as Madame Leng
- Ai Mi as Yun Que
- Omid as Han Yasi
- Zeng Keni as Zheng Nanyi
- Zhang Xuehan as Zi Yi
- Zhu Jian as Han Yaqi
- Zhang Xiaoang as Han Yike
- Yang Xiao as Han Ya

== Soundtrack ==
| # | English title | Chinese title | Artist | Lyrics | Composer | Notes |
|---|---|---|---|---|---|---|
| 1. | "Cloud's Feather" | 云之羽 | Jason Zhang | Gu Xiaosheng | Li Jin | Theme song |
| 2. | "Bestow Dreams" | 赐梦 | Yu Shuxin | Gu Xiaosheng | Li He, He Xin | |
| 3. | "The Sleepless Mountains and Moons" | 山月不眠 | Mao Buyi | Gu Xiaosheng, Liu Yulu | Li He | |
| 4. | "Clouds and Mud" | 云泥 | Curley G | Gu Xiaosheng | Chen Yun Ruo Shui | |
| 5. | "The Distant Mountains Are Like Yesterday" | 远山如昨 | Chen Chusheng | Gu Xiaosheng | Wang Jinlin | |
| 6. | "Waiting for Me to Become Us" | 等我变成我们 | Ye Xuanqing | Gu Xiaosheng | Xiao Kui | |
| 7. | "A Shallow End" | 终角浅 | Chou Chuan-huing | Gu Xiaosheng | Liu Zhaolun | |
| 8. | "Singer" | 歌者 | Tian Jiarui | Gu Xiaosheng | Wang Zepeng | |
