= Love in the Clouds =

2025 Chinese television series

- Promotional poster
- Genre: Xianxia; Romance
- Based on: Love in the Clouds (入青云) by Bai Lu Cheng Shuang
- Written by: Ji Sangrou; Ding Lu
- Directed by: Peng Xuejun; Zhi Zhu
- Starring: Hou Minghao; Lu Yuxiao
- Opening theme: "Love Through Clouds" (爱入青云) by Huang Xiaoyun
- Ending theme: "Poisoned Wine" (毒酒) by Liu Yuning
- Composer: Yi Rui
- Country of origin: China
- Original language: Mandarin
- No. of seasons: 1
- No. of episodes: 36

Production
- Producer: Fang Ying
- Production location: Hengdian World Studios
- Cinematography: Hong Wei
- Running time: 45 minutes
- Production companies: Seasons Pictures; Spark Studio

Original release
- Network: Youku
- Release: 8 October – 26 October 2025

Love in the Clouds (Chinese: 入青云; pinyin: Rù Qīngyún) is a 2025 Chinese television series based on the web novel of the same name by Bai Lu Cheng Shuang. It stars Hou Minghao and Lu Yuxiao in leading roles. The series premiered on Youku on October 8, 2025. It is also available for streaming on Netflix, Viki and Viu in selected regions.

The series has a 7.0 rating on Douban from over 73,000 users and the popularity exceeded 10,000 heat index on Youku by the end of the broadcast.

== Synopsis ==
Since childhood, Ming Yi had to disguise herself as a man and enter Qingyun tournament as crown prince Ming Xian, bringing victory to Yaoguang Mountain for consecutive seven years. However, she was defeated by Ji Bozai, a warrior of Jixing Abyss who has a criminal history. Ming Yi was poisoned by Heavenly Grief causing her spiritual vein to break during the tournament. Believing Ji Bozai had poisoned her, she approaches him in disguise of a fairy attendant from Moonlit Blossoms to get the antidote.

== Cast and characters ==
=== Main ===
- Hou Minghao as Ji Bozai
  - Wu Jiajun as young Ji Bozai

A warrior from Jixing Abyss who defeats Ming Yi in annual Qingyun tournament bringing Blessed Rain to Jixing Abyss after years. Previously, he was a prisoner in Sunken Abyss.

- Lu Yuxiao as Ming Yi
  - Zhang Xiwei as young Ming Yi

Since childhood, she had to disguise herself as a man and entered Qingyun tournament as crown prince Ming Xian, bringing victory to Yaoguang Mountain for consecutive seven years. However, she was defeated by Ji Bozai and was poisoned causing her spiritual vein to break. In order to fix her broken vein, she approaches Ji Bozai in disguise of an attendant from Moonlit Blossoms.

=== Supporting ===
- Yu Chengen as Situ Ling
  - Cao Tiexuan as young Situ Ling

Chief of the Judgement Hall of Jixing Abyss.

- He Nan as Mu Tianji

Princess of Jixing Abyss and Venerable of Shouhua Academy. She wants to marry Ji Bozai to stabilize her position against her uncle. She had feelings for Yan Xiao until he had deceived her to rise in ranks with the help of Lord Hanfeng.

- Hu Yunhao as Mu Qibai / Lord Hanfeng

Younger brother of the Emperor of Jixing Abyss and Princess Mu Tianji's uncle. As the Emperor had no sons, he was supposed to be the next ruler. However, his position gets threatened with the appearance of Ji Bozai.

- Quan Yilun as Yan Xiao

Imperial physician of Jixing Abyss who works for Lord Hanfeng. He has a complicated relationship with Mu Tianji.

- Lu Qi as Buxiu, Ji Bozai's companion beast
- Yu Yao as Twenty-Seven / Er Shi Qi, Ming Yi's companion beast
  - Ding Chenzhe as Er Shi Qi
- Hao Yanfei as Granny Xun, Stewardess of Wugui Sea
- Pan Junya as Zhang Tai

Ming Yi's friend from Moonlit Blossoms

- Deng Xiaoci as Xun Ming

General of Jixing Abyss. He is from Yousu Tribe who can change into multiple forms.

- Ke Bolun as Ming Xin, half-brother of Ming Yi
- Tian Ai as Bo Yulan, Ji Bozai's master
- Zhu Lilan as Fu Yue, Owner of Moonlit Blossoms of Jixing Abyss
- Lin Jiangguo as She Tianlin
- Su Qi as Xiu Yun
- Zhong Linger as Qian Qian
- Zuo Ye as Ming Xian

Crown Prince of Yaoguang Mountain, Ming Yi's male identity

- Cao Zishuo as Meng Yangqiu
- Lin Xiao as Sun Liao, warrior of Jixing Abyss
- Yu Bo as Ming Zhenghui, Emperor of Yaoguang Mountain, Ming Yi's father
- Lin Jing as Lady Meng, Ming Xin's mother
- Hu Caihong as Jing Shu

Empress of Yaoguang Mountain and Ming Yi's mother who had disguised her as a man since birth.

- Peng Bo as Mu Yuanfeng, Emperor of Jixing Abyss
- Qu Gang as Zhao Heng, Immortal Lord Zhu Shui
- Li Shuai as Hou Zhao, Former chief of the Judgement Hall
- Zhong Baoer as Ruo Shui, Hou Zhao's illegitimate daughter
- Yang Pengcheng as Shao Qun
- Wang Junbi as Mu Xinliu, Mu Qibai's cousin and Xun Ming's late wife

== Soundtrack ==
No.	English title	Chinese title	Artist	Composer	Lyricist	Notes
1.	"Poisoned Wine"	毒酒	Liu Yuning	Yi Rui	Gong Shujun	Ending theme song
2.	"Love Through Clouds"	爱入青云	Huang Xiaoyun	Yi Rui	Gong Shujun	Opening theme song
3.	"If Your World Doesn't Have a Warm Sun"	若你的世界没有暖阳	Hou Minghao	Yi Rui	Gong Shujun	
4.	"Pretend It's Nothing"	假装没什么	Wang Jingwen	Yi Rui	Gong Shujun	
5.	"Pretend It's Nothing"	假装没什么	Lu Yuxiao	Yi Rui	Gong Shujun	
6.	"I Am Willing"	我愿	Gong Shujun	Yi Rui	Gong Shujun	

== Production ==
On March 15, 2024, Hou Minghao and Lu Yuxiao were officially announced as the leads of the series. A concept poster was also released on the same day. The filming of Love in the Clouds started in Hengdian World Studios and the booting ceremony was held on August 31, 2024. The shooting of whole drama was completed on January 10, 2025.
