= Veil of Shadows (TV series) =

2026 Chinese television series

- Official poster
- Also known as: Painted Skin: The Resurrection
- Genre: Wuxia; Romance
- Written by: Guo Jingming
- Directed by: Guo Jingming
- Starring: Ju Jingyi; Tian Jiarui; Zeng Shunxi; Chen Duling
- Country of origin: China
- Original language: Mandarin
- No. of seasons: 1
- No. of episodes: 29

Production
- Production location: Hengdian World Studios
- Running time: 45 minutes
- Production companies: ZUI; Youku; Ji Shi Yu; TH Entertainment

Original release
- Network: Youku
- Release: 1 April – 17 April 2026

Veil of Shadows (Chinese: 月鳞绮纪) is a 2026 Chinese television series directed and written by Guo Jingming. It stars Ju Jingyi, Tian Jiarui, Zeng Shunxi, and Chen Duling in leading roles. The series premiered on Youku on April 1, 2026 with 29 episodes. It is also available for streaming on Netflix in selected regions.

== Synopsis ==
Lu Wuyi, the youngest nine-tailed fox of the Formless Moon, is sent on a mission to capture the traitor Xiaowei along with her sister Wu Wangyan. She infiltrates the Wei Mansion in Luo'an, where she encounters Wu Shiguang, a man burdened with a demonic body and a troubled past. Meanwhile, Ji Ling and Li Jie of the Shilin Sect arrives there with their own hidden motives. As they seek to protect the world, they are faced with difficult sacrifices and must confront fate, human nature, and their longing for love and freedom.

== Cast and characters ==
=== Main ===
- Ju Jingyi as Lu Wuyi / Di Zhu

Lu Wuyi: The youngest nine-tailed fox of Formless Moon, she is sent to Luo'an along with her older sister, Wu Wangyan, to capture the traitor Xiaowei, who betrayed their sect long ago. There, she meets Ji Ling, the man she had fallen in love with years ago without knowing his true identity.
Di Zhu: Aodeng tribe leader's daughter who fell in love with Manman. She was betrayed and killed by Manman who only approached her for the Star Stone. She was the first host of Jiu Ying.

- Tian Jiarui as Ji Ling / Dragon Deity (Longshen) / Manman / Ji Can / Yuan Xizai

Ji Ling: A cheerful demon hunter from the Shilin Sect, he first met Lu Wuyi years ago, but she erased his memories of their encounter. He meets her again in Luo'an City while investigating Xiaowei's case, unaware of their shared past. His true identity is a fox puppet created by Longshen. Though he appears as a separate person, he is actually a part of Longshen himself.
Dragon Deity Longshen: The dragon god of who protects all the beings. He is the master of Shilin Sect. His true identity is that of a puppet deity created by the original Ninth Dragon Deity, Longshen (Chi Wen) to act as a substitute for him while he is sealing the body of the Monarch of All Demons within the Dragon Abyss. His original spirit form was a fox demon.
Manman: A high ranking demon from Green Ape Demon tribe who approached Di Zhu to get the Star Stone. He betrayed Di Zhu and brought disaster to the Aodeng tribe one thousand years ago.
Ji Can: A lonescale demon born from Ji Ling's loneliness.
Yuan Xizai: Yuan Wuhuo's younger brother who was born blind. He passed away from his injuries due to Star Stone blast.

- Zeng Shunxi as Wu Shiguang / Cang Hao

Wu Shiguang: A mysterious demon hunter who is secretly a member of annihilated flood dragon tribe, he wishes to kill the Dragon Deity to take revenge on him for massacring his entire clan. His true identity is that of a Tenth Dragon Deity born from the dragon stone created by the sacrifices of Nine Dragon Gods. He meets Wu Wangyan while trying to capture Xiaowei in Luo'an.
Cang Hao: Leader of Flood Dragon tribe and Wu Shiguang's foster father in Star Stone illusion.

- Chen Duling as Wu Wangyan / Qing Yi

Wu Wangyan: Lu Wuyi's older sister and a nine-tailed fox from the Formless Moon sect, she was sent to Luo'an alongside Wuyi to capture Xiaowei. While there, she meets Wu Shiguang, with whom she is constantly in conflict.
Qing Yi: Cang Hao's wife and Wu Shiguang's foster mother in Star Stone illusion.

- Yan An as Li Jie / Yuan Wuhuo / Yuan Xizai

Li Jie: The commander of the Shilin Sect, he was saved by Longshen years ago. He remains deeply loyal, continuing to serve by his side. Besides Longshen, he is the only one who knows Ji Ling's true identity. Having lost his memories years ago, he only remembers that he has a brother.
Yuan Wuhuo: A six-eyed butterfly demon who looks exactly like Li Jie. His goal is to break the seal of Jiu Ying, the Monarch of All Demon.
Yuan Xizai: Yuan Wuhuo's younger brother in Star Stone illusion. One hundred fifty years ago, he was a part of Shilin Sect.

=== Supporting ===
- Ou Mide as Wu Zhiqi, a demon from Green Ape tribe and one of the four great demons
- Wu Han as You Chi, a low rank weasel demon
- Wu Zhengrong as Bai Ze, one of the four great demons
- Chen Ruoxuan as Mo Yuntan
- Gao Zitian as Jin Zheng
- Zhou Lingxu as Hua Qi
- Zhang Shian as Ye Changsheng
- Xia Zhiguang as Liu Weixue / Xiao Wei, nine-tailed fox of Formless Moon Palace. One of the four great demons
- Rao Jiadi as Yu Shengwei
- Gao Jiayan as Luo Wei
- Zuo Chenyi as Wei Qing
- Fan Shiqi as Xie Lingxi, Wu Shiguang's master
- Liu Yu as Tian Di, human form of the star stone
- Wang Duo as Chi Wen / Longshen, the real dragon deity and the ninth son of the dragon, stuck within the Dragon Abyss to seal the Monarch of All Demons. He created the Wooden Fox Puppet (Ji Ling) to act as his substitute while being away.
- Jiang Zhenyu as Si Feng
- Chang Huasen as Han Ba / Yan Bi, one of the four great demons
- Jin Jing as Mu Long
- Sun Chenjun as Cui Jun
- Cao Yuchen as Da Ji
- Jiang Yiyan as Nüwa
- Dennis as Twin Six-Eyed Butterfly Demon
- Kirigo as Twin Six-Eyed Butterfly Demon
- He Qiang as Ao Erlie
- Xu Yang as Cang Hao, Wu Shiguang's foster father
- Chi Ningning as Qing Yi, Wu Shiguang's foster mother
- Yang Baosheng as Yuan Wuhuo's father
- Bao Lei as Yuan Wuhuo's mother

== Production ==
The booting ceremony of the series was held on December 2, 2024 and on December 16, official cast of the series was announced. On March 22, 2025, a fire suddenly broke out in the sets of Hengdian and the artists and staffs were safely evacuated, with no casualties. The shooting of the series ended on April 11, 2025 and by August 22, reservation for the series exceeded 1 million on Youku.
