= The Legend of Lu Xiaofeng (Chinese TV series) =

Chinese TV series

- Official poster
- 凤舞九天
- Genre: Wuxia
- Based on: Lu Xiaofeng Series by Gu Long
- Written by: Ren Zhuangliu
- Directed by: Zhou Jingtao; Liang Jingyu
- Starring: Gong Jun
- Country of origin: China
- Original language: Mandarin
- No. of episodes: 40

Production
- Production locations: Alxa; Hengdian World Studios
- Running time: ≈45 minutes per episode
- Production companies: Linmon Pictures; Tencent Video

Original release
- Network: Tencent Video

The Legend of Lu Xiaofeng (凤舞九天) is an upcoming Chinese wuxia television series adapted from the Lu Xiaofeng Series by Gu Long, starring Gong Jun as Lu Xiaofeng. The booting ceremony was held on March 6, 2026.

== Synopsis ==
A wave of mysterious crimes spreads across the jianghu. To maintain order, Wuwang Pavilion offers a cure for blindness as a reward and entrusts Lu Xiaofeng to solve these cases. Determined to heal his close friend Hua Manlou, Lu Xiaofeng takes on the mission. With his sharp mind and unique skill, he teams up with trusted allies - Ximen Chuixue, a deadly swordsman; Hua Manlou, whose keen senses make him invaluable; Yuluocha, a powerful yet enigmatic supporter; Zhu Ting, a master of ingenious devices; and Sikong Zhaixing, a skilled thief and master of disguise. Together, they crack seemingly impossible cases and uncover a major conspiracy, protecting the innocent and restoring peace to the jianghu.

== Cast ==
- Gong Jun as Lu Xiaofeng
- Zheng Yecheng as Ximen Chuixue
- Riley Wang as Yuluocha
- Quan Yilun as Hua Manlou
- Chang Long as Zhu Ting
- Li Qing as Sikong Zhaixing

== Production ==
On March 6, 2026, the opening ceremony was held, and the cast was officially announced. The series wrapped up filming on July 27, 2026.
