= Dai Luwa =

Chinese actress (born 1997)

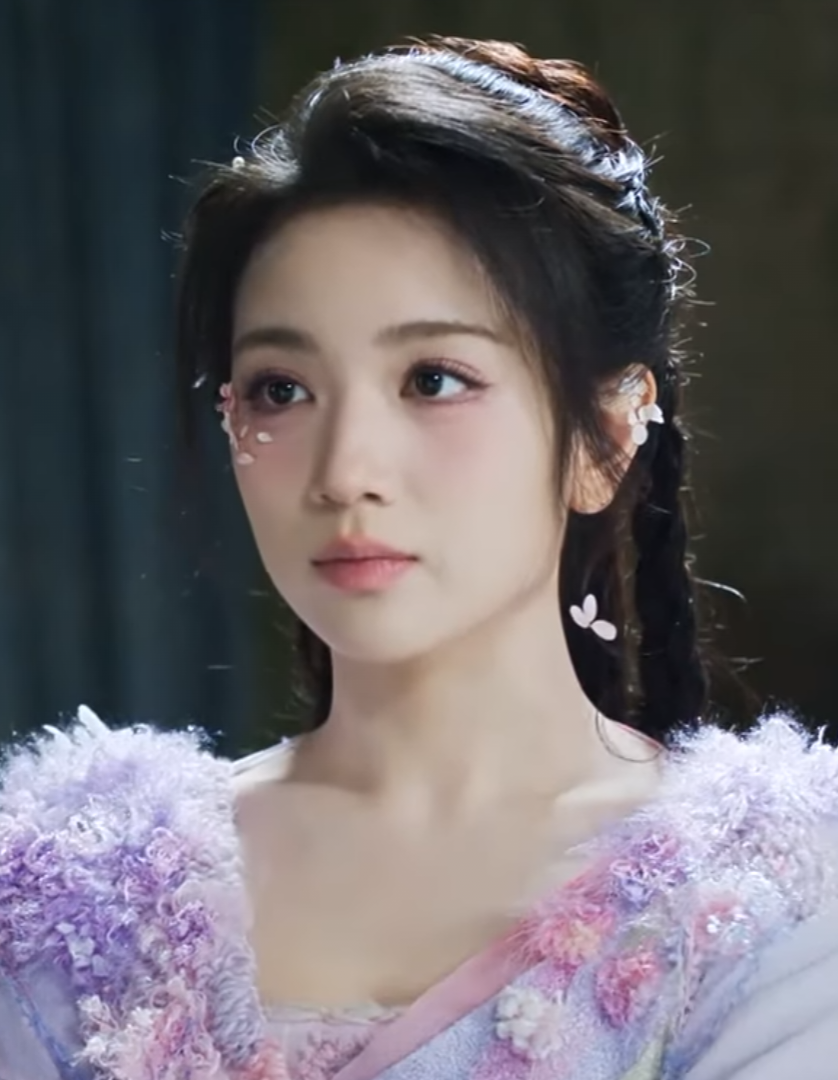
- Dai in Moonlight Mystique (2025)
- Born: April 29, 1997 (age 29); Shenyang, Liaoning, China
- Education: Central Academy of Drama
- Occupation: Actress
- Years active: 2016–present
- Agent: Youhug Media
- Height: 165 cm (5 ft 5 in)

Chinese name
- Simplified Chinese: 代露娃
- Hanyu Pinyin: Dài Lùwá

Dai Luwa (Chinese: 代露娃; pinyin: Dài Lùwá, born April 29, 1997) is a Chinese actress. She is best known for her roles in Lost You Forever (2023) and Moonlight Mystique (2025).

== Discography ==
=== Soundtrack appearances ===
Year	Title	Album
2021	"Sweet Bombing" (甜蜜轰炸)	Love Crossed OST
2022	"Guardian Star" (守护星)	My Calorie Boy OST

== Filmography ==
=== Television series ===
Year	Title	Role	Ref.
2016	Perfect Wedding	Feng Xiaoyu	
2018	The Legend of Zu 2	Tang Xing	
2018	Tomb of the Sea	Zhang Weiwei	
2018	When We Were Young	Huang Dengdeng	
2019	The Plough Department of Song Dynasty	Wu Yaoguang	
2020	Cross Fire	Chu Ge	
2020	Target Person	Ke Tang	
2021	Please Classmate	Yuan Caixi	
2021	Love Crossed	Jiang Kele	
2021	People's Property	Lu Jiajia	
2021	To Fly With You	Cui Enjing	
2022	My Calorie Boy	Xu Jingjing	
2023	Qi Zi Ni Xi Shou Ce	An Qi	
2023	Gen Z	Tian Xingxing	
2023	Lost You Forever	Haoling Yi / A Nian	
2024	Lost You Forever 2	Haoling Yi / A Nian	
2025	Moonlight Mystique	Fu Ling	
2025	Youthful Glory	Bai Minmin	
2025	The Litchi Road	Zheng Jinniang	
2025	Blood River	Situ Xue	
2026	Unveil: Jadewind	Zhao Yudi	
2026	The Legend of Rosy Clouds	Wei Shisan	
2026	Taming the Husband	Jin Baozhu	
TBA	Xin Su	Qiu Tang	
TBA	Now or Never	Lu Luo	

== Awards and nominations ==
Year	Award	Category	Nominee(s)/Work(s)	Result	Ref.
2024	Tencent Video Star Awards	Best Newcomer in a Television Series	Dai Luwa	Won	
2025	iQIYI Scream Night	Top 10 Actor of the Year	Dai Luwa	Won	
