= Taming the Husband =

2026 Chinese television series

- Traditional Chinese: 寶珠
- Simplified Chinese: 宝珠
- Hanyu Pinyin: Bǎozhū
- Genre: Historical romance
- Written by: Wei Jingjing
- Directed by: Guo Feng; Liu Zheng
- Starring: Dai Luwa; Lai Weiming; He Luoluo
- Opening theme: "砚上珠" by: Dai Luwa; Lai Weiming
- Country of origin: China
- Original language: Mandarin
- No. of episodes: 24

Production
- Producer: Luo Pan
- Running time: 35 minutes
- Production companies: Hunan TV; Mango TV

Original release
- Network: Mango TV
- Release: November 18, 2026 – present

Taming the Husband (Chinese: 宝珠) is an ongoing Chinese historical romance television series written by Wei Jingjing and co-directed by Guo Feng and Liu Zheng. Starring Dai Luwa, Lai Weiming, and He Luoluo, the series tells the story of a butcher's daughter who becomes the concubine of the disabled heir to a shipping family.

Taming the Husband premiered on Mango TV on November 18, 2026, and is also available for streaming on Disney+. Alongside the series's broadcast, Mango TV launched a promotional spin-off variety program titled Mang Zhe Qu Xun Bao (Chinese: 芒着去寻宝). Developed under Mango TV's 'Big Mango Plan' (大芒计划), the 24-episode series marks Dai Luwa's first historical drama as female lead and Lai Weiming's first role as male lead. Luo Pan serves as producer.

== Synopsis ==
After her father's death, butcher's daughter Jin Baozhu enters a contract marriage with Xie Yan, the disabled heir, to escape mistreatment. When Xie faces scandal, Baozhu helps clear his name and expose corruption.

== Cast ==
- Dai Luwa as Jin Baozhu, who volunteers to become Xie Yan's concubine in hopes of securing financial stability.
- Lai Weiming as Xie Yan, the eldest son of a shipping family who is left disabled after an accident.
- He Luoluo (credited as Xu Yining) as Song Jingxing
- Wang Xiaoyunzi
- Ke Ying
- Chen Xinhao
- Yao Jingyuan

== Soundtrack ==
The series' soundtrack features performances by Malaysian singer Shila Amzah and Chinese singers Wang Heye, Jess Lee, and Chen Zhuoxuan. Shila and Wang's duet, "Wish and Fate", drew media coverage in Malaysia and China upon its release.

== Reception ==
Prior to its broadcast, Marie Claire Taiwan noted audience comparisons between the series' premise and those of other historical dramas, while highlighting the casting of Dai Luwa and Lai Weiming in their first lead roles.
