= He Nan (actress) =

Chinese actress (born 1998)

- Born: Li Henan; November 2, 1998 (age 27); Beijing, China
- Occupation: Actress
- Years active: 2018–present
- Agents: He Nan Studio; Yuntu Space-time Film and Television
- Height: 168 cm (5 ft 6 in)

Chinese name
- Simplified Chinese: 鹤男
- Hanyu Pinyin: Hè Nán

Li Henan (Chinese: 李鹤男, born November 2, 1998), known mononymously as He Nan, is a Chinese actress. She gained recognition for playing the role of Mu Tianji in Love in the Clouds (2025).

== Filmography ==
=== Television series ===
Year	Title	Role	Notes	Ref.
2018	Only Kiss Without Love	Tong Yin		
2019	Fall in Love	Tang Mingxuan		
2020	The Sleuth of Ming Dynasty	Duo Erla		
2021	Honey, Don't Run Away Season 2	Ye Xiaotang		
2022	Unchained Love	Tong Yun		
2022	Mi Xiao Quan Shang Xue Ji	Teacher Mo		
2023	Once and Forever: The Sun Rises	Qin Xi		
2023	Once and Forever	young Qin Qian		
2023	Who's Your Daddy?	Jian Yangyang		
2023	My Beloved Concubine	Su Xiao		
2024	Mi Xiao Quan Shang Xue Ji	Teacher Mo	Season 2–3	
2024	Detective Chinatown Season 2	Miss Mao		
2024	My Troublesome Honey	Nie Rouzhu		
2025	Love in the Clouds	Mu Tianji		
2025	Love and Crown	Zhong Lin		
TBA	Jing Huan	Sang Luo / Ye Xiaowei		
TBA	Inverted Fate	Teng Yuyi		
