= 2017 Idol Star Athletics Archery Rhythmic Gymnastics Aerobics Championships =

- Also known as: 2017 Idol Star Athletics Championships New Year Special
- Genre: Sports; Variety show
- Written by: Kim Jeong-min; Byun Eun-jeong; Woo Eun-jeong; Kim Young-ri; Kim So-young; Nam Soo-hee
- Directed by: Choi Haeng-ho
- Presented by: Jun Hyun-moo; Jung Eun-ji; Lee Soo-geun
- Starring: 194 contestants
- Country of origin: South Korea
- Original language: Korean
- No. of episodes: 2

Production
- Executive producer: Park Jeong-gyu
- Production locations: Goyang Gymnasium; Jungangro 1601, Ilsanseo-gu, Goyang, Gyeonggi-do
- Running time: 140 minutes

Original release
- Network: MBC
- Release: January 30 – January 30, 2017

The 2017 Idol Star Athletics Archery Rhythmic Gymnastics Aerobics Championships (Korean: 2017 아이돌스타 육상 양궁 리듬체조 에어로빅 선수권 대회) was held at Goyang Gymnasium in Goyang, South Korea on January 16, 2017 and was broadcast on MBC on January 30, 2017 at 17:15 (KST) for two episodes.

== Cast ==
=== Presenters ===
Jun Hyun-moo, Jung Eun-ji and Lee Soo-geun hosted the show.

=== Main ===
- Members of male K-pop groups:
  - Astro, B.A.P, B1A4, BTS, EXO, Imfact, KNK, Madtown, Monsta X, NCT 127, NU'EST, Seventeen, SF9, Snuper, Teen Top, UP10TION, Victon, VIXX
- Members of female K-pop groups:
  - AOA, Berry Good, Brave Girls, Cosmic Girls, EXID, Fiestar, GFriend, Gugudan, Hello Venus, Heyne, Jeon Min-kyung, Laboum, Lovelyz, Melody Day, MIXX, Oh My Girl, Red Velvet, Rui (H.U.B), Sonamoo, Twice

== Synopsis ==
The episode features male and female K-pop entertainers, which competes in various sports competitions. At the championships, a total of eight events (four in athletics, two in archery, one in rhythmic gymnastics and one in aerobics) were contested: four by men and four by women. There were 194 K-pop idols participating, divided into 38 teams follow their music groups.

== Results ==
=== Men ===
Athletics

Event	Gold	Silver	Bronze
60 m (24 competitors)	Woosung (Snuper)	Moonbin (Astro)	Han Seung-woo (Victon)
4 × 100 m	Jeonghan (Seventeen); Mingyu (Seventeen); S.Coups (Seventeen); Wonwoo (Seventeen)	J-Hope (BTS); Jungkook (BTS); RM (BTS); Suga (BTS)	Hongbin (VIXX); Hyuk (VIXX); Ken (VIXX); Leo (VIXX)

Aerobics

Event	Gold	Silver	Bronze
Men's team	Astro	Seventeen	Snuper

Archery

Event	Gold	Silver	Bronze
Men's team	CNU (B1A4); Gongchan (B1A4); Jinyoung (B1A4)	Jun (Seventeen); Vernon (Seventeen); Woozi (Seventeen)	No winner

=== Women ===
Athletics

Event	Gold	Silver	Bronze
60 m (30 competitors)	Rui (H.U.B)	Yuju (GFriend)	Binnie (Oh My Girl)
4 × 100 m	Binnie (Oh My Girl); Hyojung (Oh My Girl); Jiho (Oh My Girl); YooA (Oh My Girl)	Hani (EXID); Hyelin (EXID); Jeonghwa (EXID); LE (EXID)	SinB (GFriend); Sowon (GFriend); Yerin (GFriend); Yuju (GFriend)

Rhythmic gymnastics

Event	Gold	Silver	Bronze
Women	Cao Lu (Fiestar)	No winner	Cheng Xiao (Cosmic Girls)
Women	Mina (Twice)	No winner	Cheng Xiao (Cosmic Girls)

Archery

Event	Gold	Silver	Bronze
Women's team	Eunha (GFriend); Umji (GFriend); Yerin (GFriend)	Hani (EXID); Hyelin (EXID); Jeonghwa (EXID)	No winner

== Ratings ==
Episode #	Original broadcast date	TNmS Ratings		AGB Nielsen Ratings	
Episode #	Original broadcast date	Nationwide	Seoul National Capital Area	Nationwide	Seoul National Capital Area
1	January 30, 2017	8.3%	9.5%	9.3%	9.4%
2	January 30, 2017	10.5%	12.2%	11.8%	12.3%
