= A Girl Like Me (TV series) =

2021 Chinese television series

- Promotional poster
- Traditional Chinese: 我就是這般女子
- Simplified Chinese: 我就是这般女子
- Hanyu Pinyin: Wǒ jiùshì zhè bān nǚzǐ
- Genre: Historical fiction; Romance
- Based on: A Girl Like Me by Yue Xia Die Ying
- Written by: Rao Jun
- Directed by: Chen Wei Xiang
- Starring: Guan Xiaotong; Hou Minghao
- Opening theme: "醉清欢" by Wu Qiong
- Ending theme: "花信" by Hou Minghao
- Country of origin: China
- Original language: Mandarin
- No. of seasons: 1
- No. of episodes: 40

Production
- Executive producer: Qi Shuai
- Production location: Hengdian World Studios
- Camera setup: Multiple-camera setup
- Running time: 45 minutes
- Production companies: Tencent Pictures; Gu Yuan Culture

Original release
- Network: Tencent Video
- Release: January 18 – February 15, 2021

A Girl Like Me (Chinese: 我就是这般女子; pinyin: Wǒ jiùshì zhè bān nǚzǐ) is an ancient costume romantic comedy directed by Chen Weixiang and Yang Xiaobo, starring Guan Xiaotong and Hou Minghao, Li Zonglin, Zhao Shunran, An Yongchang, Xia Nan and Jiang Haomin.

The play is adapted from the novel of the same name by Yue Xia Die Ying. It tells the story of the wealthy daughter Ban Hua and the family son Rong Xia who grow up hand in hand and love each other for a lifetime by chance and coincidence.

The series aired on Tencent Video on January 18, 2021.

== Plot ==
This is a story of a demon girl who has been divorced three times and a gentleman who is the most talented and beautiful in the world hand in hand to abuse her. She is also a "bad luck" heroine who dreams of her own destiny. Ban Hua, who is outwardly outgoing and has a straightforward personality, but is actually kind and delicate, was inexplicably divorced three times. With a big personality, she did not change her straightforward style and faced the outside world, but unexpectedly found that she had The ability to predict the future through dreams. The dream that can predict the future makes the kind-hearted Banhua decide to help her family avoid bad luck.

At the same time, in order to understand the mystery of the extermination of the family, the peerless male protagonist Rong Xia devoted himself to chasing the truth of his life experience in court, and met such a woman Banhua by chance. The two work together to unlock the secret step by step and love each other for a lifetime.

== Cast ==
=== Main ===
- Guan Xiaotong as Ban Hua
  - The granddaughter of the eldest princess, she likes to wear gorgeous clothes to lively places. On the surface, she is very outgoing and has a straightforward personality, but she is very kind and delicate. After being divorced three times for no reason, she has a carefree personality. , but unexpectedly discovered that she had the ability to predict the future through dreams.
- Hou Minghao as Rong Xia
  - Rong Xia is the unparalleled son of the capital, with excellent calligraphy and painting, his appearance is better than Pan An, and he is known as the number one gentleman in the great cause. Although Rong Xia looks gentle and elegant on the outside, he is dark-hearted, ambitious, peerless and independent. In order to uncover the mystery of the extermination of the family, he devoted himself to chasing the truth of his life experience in the court, and met Ban Hua by chance.
- Zhao Shunran as Shi Jin
  - Shi Jin is the grandson of Shi Yan, the right minister. Although many people think that Shi Jin is rigid and ruthless, Ban Hua thinks that he is a soft-hearted person. Waiting for Banhua affectionately, love is not enough, for the sake of the family, he can only pay attention to Banhua silently, and dare not speak of love. On the day of Banhua's wedding, he became sour and vomited a mouthful of blood.
- Li Zonglin as Ban Heng
  - Ban Heng is Ban Hua's younger brother. He is enthusiastic, but too mischievous and has a relatively low family status. Ban Heng likes his sister Banhua, and when someone bullies Banhua, he will come out to defend her. Ban Heng is very concerned about Ban Hua's marriage issues, and seeing her and Rong Xia's relationship progress, he blends in and hopes that the relationship between the two will go smoothly.
- An Yongchang as Xie Wanyu
  - Xie Wanyu is Miss Xie's family. She likes to cook and handsome guys. At first, she didn't like Banhua because her brother Xie Qilin was forced to marry Banhua. Afterwards, through various experiences, Xie Wanyu gradually became good friends with Ban Hua.
- Xia Nan as Shi Feixian
  - Shi Feixian is the granddaughter of the Right Prime Minister Shi Yan. She is quite talented and likes Rong Xia very much. Ke Rongxia's heart was attached to the court, and in the end he rejected Shi Feixian on the grounds that he had his fiancée Ban Hua. In order to get Rong Xia back, Shi Feixian did not hesitate to use her best friend Xie Wanyu as a tool.
- Kang Ho Min as Jiang Luo
  - Jiang Luo is the scheming and playful second prince. Jiang Luo liked Shi Feixian, and for her sake, he rejected the emperor's order to designate Xie Wanyu as his wife. Shi Feixian used Jiang Luo, but Jiang Luo remained affectionate, and lost in the power struggle and became a lunatic.
- Li Zehui as Princess Anle
  - Princess Anle is Emperor Yunqing's favorite eldest daughter. Princess Anle has liked Banhua's straightforward and unaffected personality since she was a child.

== Production ==
In the opening scene of Banhua, the art team spent two months conducting three special seminars to finalize the conceptual design drawing and the actual scene landing plan, and the scene design was refined to street vendors; in order to better show the magnificent scene, this show The play used a group of 350 people, a lot of fireworks and horses, and it took four nights to shoot the 15-minute opening.

In terms of clothing styling, the team tried their best to restore the texture of the original novel, integrated Chinese classical elements and modern aesthetics, learned from others, and kept improving; at the same time, it also made exclusive customization according to different scenes and different characters, hand-sewn and cut, and the production process was extremely complicated; Among them, there are nearly 80 sets of Banhua's clothing. The pre-design and post-production period is as long as half a year. snow velvet coat.
