= Taxi (Sunny Girls song) =

2016 song by Sunny Girls

Song by Sunny Girls
- Language: Korean; English
- Published: November 27, 2016
- Genre: K-pop; dance-pop; new wave
- Length: 3:27
- Composers: Full8loom; Jin‑ri
- Lyricists: Duble Sidekick; Full8loom; Jin‑ri
- Producer: Duble Sidekick

"Taxi" is a song recorded by Sunny Girls, a South Korean supergroup composed of five members from different idol girl groups: Cheng Xiao from WJSN, Eunha from GFriend, Nancy from Momoland, Nayoung from Gugudan, and YooA from Oh My Girl. The song was released on November 27, 2016, following a performance on the South Korean music program Inkigayo. It was performed a second time on Inkigayo on December 4, and later at the SBS Gayo Daejeon music festival on December 26.

The group was created as part of the Inkigayo Music Crush project, which formed various supergroups to perform original music on Inkigayo. As a song, "Taxi" incorporates dance-pop and new wave influences; it has been noted as having a more mature sound and concept than songs from the members' original groups. It was received well by fans, who commended the group's lineup and distinct concept.

== Background ==
On November 20, 2016, Sunny Girls were revealed as a temporary unit composed of five idols from recently-debuted girl groups: Cheng Xiao from WJSN, Eunha from GFriend, Nancy from Momoland, Nayoung from Gugudan, and YooA from Oh My Girl. They were formed as the second supergroup of the Inkigayo Music Crush project, a collaboration between Inkigayo's producer Jang Seok-jin and the South Korean production and the songwriting duo Duble Sidekick; the project formed various supergroups who would release original music to be performed on Inkigayo. The first supergroup formed for Inkigayo Music Crush was revealed two weeks earlier and consisted of the idol singers Jihyo of Twice and Eunji of Apink, as well as the solo artist Ben. The song itself was initially described as an exciting dance song produced by the "hit-making machines" Duble Sidekick, and its release was set for November 27.

Nancy promoted "Taxi" and Momoland's debut single "Jjan! Koong! Kwang!" at the same time.

Sunny Girls first appeared on the November 20 broadcast of Inkigayo to introduce themselves. On November 22, a video teaser was released for Sunny Girls' first performance, in which the group members introduced themselves to each other and are later shown during their dance rehearsals. At the same time, Inkigayo hosted a quiz game on their official website to guess the meaning behind the group name Sunny Girls. The name was revealed to be derived from the fact that Inkigayo airs exclusively on Sundays, and the members later added that it also refers to a girl group that "sparkles like sunshine".

In an interview with K-Culture Now, a YouTube channel owned by Yonhap News Agency, Nancy, who had first debuted with Momoland on November 10, spoke about her experience performing "Taxi" with Sunny Girls. She stated that performing with more experienced idols taught her a lot and that her group-mates were very kind to her. In a later interview with the entertainment newspaper Ten Asia, she stated that Sunny Girls couldn't practice together often due to their conflicting schedules, but it all turned out better than she expected, calling performing with Sunny Girls "a special experience". She added that while busy schedules are sometimes fun for her, she also felt it was difficult not getting enough sleep during them, calling an idol's schedule "a battle against sleep".

== Release and promotion ==
Sunny Girls first performed "Taxi" on November 27 on Inkigayo. Shortly after, at 1:00 PM, (Note: Korean Standard Time (UTC+9:00)) the song was uploaded to the South Korean music streaming service Melon. Shortly before the performance, Jang stated that while he had initially felt somewhat guilty for making the girls take time away from their busy schedules, he was put at ease by how the members of Sunny Girls enjoyed rehearsing for the performance. Jang also praised the girls for their polish, adding that he would consider allowing Sunny Girls to perform at the year-end SBS Gayo Daejeon music festival if the initial performance was well-received. On the afternoon of the same day, the group member Cheng Xiao announced through WJSN's official Twitter account that the song would be performed again next week. "Taxi" was performed a second time on Inkigayo on December 4. "Taxi" was performed at SBS Gayo Daejeon on December 26.

== Composition and choreography ==
"Taxi" is a dance-pop and new wave song whose instrumentation is composed of synthesizers and drum machines. It has been described by publications including the Segye Ilbo and Sports Donga as "funky" and "dance-oriented". (Note: Attributed to multiple references.) The song was produced by the music producer duo Duble Sidekick, who also co-wrote the song's lyrics. It was originally written by them to be sung by another prominent girl group. It was arranged by the production team Full8loom, with sub-team Glory Face contributing to the song's writing and member Jin-ri providing backing vocals.

Eunha has stated that she and Sunny Girls' other members had "always presented a girlish image. This time, through 'Taxi,' we’ve attempted a transformation. A more mature look". In a short interview that Sunny Girls did before their first performance, they referred to the concept of "Taxi" as "cute sexy". The choreography of "Taxi" includes a move which imitates hailing a taxi cab with a thumb, as well as a final backflip performed by Cheng.

== Reception ==
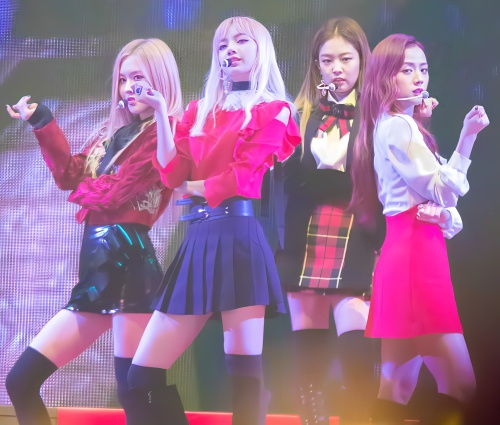
The first Inkigayo performance of "Taxi" received more YouTube views than that of Blackpink (pictured), the show's first-place winners.

"Taxi" and its performances were well-received by fans. In less than a day, the YouTube upload of Sunny Girls' first performance on Inkigayo reached over 200 thousand views. Fans left comments under the upload, praising the unit's lineup and more mature concept, which set it apart from other groups who had more innocent or cute concepts.

"Taxi", its performances, and Sunny Girls as a group received generally favourable reviews. Jeong Hui-yeon of Sports Donga and Park A-ram of the Chosun Ilbo wrote that they felt Sunny Girls were cohesive enough as a unit that they appeared to have been one group all along. Choi Hyeon-jeong of Sports Donga praised Nayoung's performance in particular, calling her delivery of the song's brief rap sections "sharp" and her vocal tone "distinctive"; she also said that "Taxi" brought out a "girl crush" side of her. Lee Da-hye of Asia Today complimented the lyricism of "Taxi" along with its choreography and Sunny Girls' vocal tones, stating that it "delighted fans' eyes and ears". Kim Su-hyeon, writing for Herald Muse, praised the group's second Inkigayo performance, commenting that they created "an unrivaled atmosphere and aura". Sports Today writer Han Su-jin commended the group's performance at SBS Gayo Daejeon, calling the group members' energies "lively" and adding that this was "true to their roles as the 'vitamins' of their respective girl groups".

== Credits ==
Credits are adapted from Apple Music.

- Sunny Girls – vocals
- Full8loom – arrangement
  - Glory Face (Note: Credited under their Korean name, Yeonggwangui Eolguldeul) – composition, lyrics
  - Jin-ri (Full8loom) – chorus, composition, lyrics
- Duble Sidekick – lyrics
