= New Year Blues =

2021 South Korean film

- Official poster
- Directed by: Hong Ji-Young
- Written by: Ko Myung-joo; Ham Hyung-kyung
- Produced by: Min Jin-soo
- Starring: Kim Kang-woo; Yoo In-na; Yoo Yeon-seok; Lee Yeon-hee; Lee Dong-hwi; Chen Duling; Yeom Hye-ran; Choi Sooyoung
- Edited by: Sin Min-gyeong
- Production company: Soofilm
- Distributed by: Acemaker Movieworks
- Release date: February 10, 2021 (South Korea)
- Running time: 114 minutes
- Country: South Korea
- Languages: Korean; Chinese; English; Spanish; German
- Box office: est. US$1.41 million

New Year Blues is a 2021 South Korean romantic comedy film. The film stars Kim Kang-woo, Yoo In-na, Yoo Yeon-seok, Lee Yeon-hee, Lee Dong-hwi, Chen Duling, Yeom Hye-ran, Choi Soo-young and Teo Yoo.

== Cast ==
- Kim Kang-woo as Kang Ji-hoo
- Yoo In-na as Hyo-young
- Yoo Yeon-seok as Jae-heon
- Lee Yeon-hee as Jin-ah
- Lee Dong-hwi as Yong-chan
- Chen Duling as Yao Lin
- Yeom Hye-ran as Yong-mi
- Choi Soo-young as Oh-wol
- Ye Soo-jung as Oh Hye-sim
- Teo Yoo as Rae-hwan
- Lee Ji-ha as Jin-ah's manager
