= Fangs of Fortune =

2024 Chinese television series

- Official poster
- Genre: Xianxia; Romance
- Written by: Guo Jingming; Ai Lisi
- Directed by: Guo Jingming; Luo Luo; Wei Nan
- Starring: Hou Minghao; Chen Duling; Tian Jiarui; Cheng Xiao; Lin Ziye
- Country of origin: China
- Original language: Mandarin
- No. of seasons: 1
- No. of episodes: 34

Production
- Executive producer: Guo Jingming
- Running time: 45 minutes
- Production companies: iQIYI; ZUI

Original release
- Release: 26 October – 16 November 2024

Fangs of Fortune (Chinese: 大梦归离) is a 2024 Chinese television series starring Hou Minghao, Chen Duling, Tian Jiarui, Cheng Xiao and Lin Ziye. It aired on iQIYI from October 26 to November 16, 2024, in 34 episodes.

== Synopsis ==
During the Zhenyuan era, goddess Bai Ze who governed the realms of humans and demons is killed by a demon. As a result, the two realms falls into chaos. At this time, the leader of all demons Zhu Yan volunteers to surrender himself and proposes to help the Demon-Hunting Bureau to send all the demons back to demon realm. Wen Xiao, the disciple of goddess Bai Ze becomes wary of Zhu Yan and decides to join the demon hunting team along with Zhou Yichen, the commander of Demon-Hunting Bureau. The three are joined by Pei Sijing, a former member of Chongwu Camp and Bai Jiu, a timid but capable doctor.

== Cast and characters ==
=== Main ===
- Hou Minghao as Zhao Yuanzhou / Zhu Yan / Lord Yinglong
  - Zhu Yan: The leader of all demons whose true form is a white ape. Later, he transformed into a human form and changed his name to Zhao Yuanzhou. His name is taken from Zhao Wan'er's deceased brother.
- Chen Duling as Wen Xiao

The new Bai Ze Goddess and a member of the Demon Hunting Bureau.

- Tian Jiarui as Zhuo Yichen / Lord Bingyi
  - Zhou Yichen: Leader of the Demon Hunting Bureau who is proficient in detective work and swordsmanship.
- Cheng Xiao as Pei Sijing

A former member of Chongwu Camp who is good at archery. She becomes a member of Demon Hunting Bureau to find her brother's whereabouts.

- Lin Ziye as Bai Jiu

A 13-year-old prodigy doctor who is proficient in medical skills. He is a member of the Demon Hunting Bureau.

=== Supporting ===
- Yan An as Li Lun

A powerful demon born from an ancient pagoda tree with the ability to possess other living things. He was once Zhu Yan's best friend but they turned against each other 8 years ago and Li Lun was sealed away by the Bai Ze goddess.

- Xu Zhenxuan as Ying Lei

The grandson of the mountain god Yingzhao who loves cooking and dreams of becoming a chef.

- Lai Weiming as Pei Siheng

Pei Sijing's younger brother, who has been weak and sickly since childhood. He was deceived by Cheng Huang and turned into a puppet for his sister. In the end, Zhao Yuanzhou used a secret technique to keep his soul in the puppet so that he can accompany his sister forever.

- Wang Yilun as Ran Yi

A fish demon that can create and control dreams. He fell in love with Lady Qi after she rescued him when he was severely injured by demon hunters.

- Peng Xiaoran as Lady Qi
- Yi Mengling as Goddess Bai Ze
- Cheng Lei as Cheng Huang
- Guli Nazha as Shen Nv
- Wang Duo as Zhuo Yixuan
- Zuo Ye as Fei

A calamity demon notorious for causing plagues wherever he goes. He loves the human realm but cannot control his ability to cause plagues. Fei was sealed together with Qing Geng in Lingxi Manor by the Bai Ze goddess for a century to prevent the spread of his plagues.

- Ai Mi as Qing Geng

The divine Qing Geng bird who was born immune to all illnesses. She was once worshipped by humans in her village until Fei's arrival killed most of them in a plague. Despite being immune, she could not save the humans who in the end, turned against her and destroyed her temple. Qing Geng willingly requested the Bai Ze goddess to seal herself away with Fei in Lingxi Manor to keep him company for eternity.

- Ou Mide as Zhen Mu
- Xin Kaili as Ao Yin
- Ji Chen as Fan Ying
- Liu Enyou as Situ Ming
- Lu Zhong as Master Qi
- Long Bin as Housekeeper Qi

==== Guest appearances ====
- Zhang Miaoyi as E Shou

A rabbit demon that can only speak in lies.

== Soundtrack ==
No.	English title	Chinese title	Artist	Lyrics	Composer	Notes
1.	"Little Verse"	小诗句	Hou Minghao, Chen Duling, Tian Jiarui, Cheng Xiao, Lin Ziye, Xu Zhenxuan, Yan An & Lai Weiming	Guo Jingming, Li Muzi	Ren Shuai	Ending theme song
2.	"Fangs of Fortune"	大梦归离	Li Yuchun	Guo Jingming	Liu Zhaolun	Theme song
3.	"Dream's Candlewick"	梦的烛衣	Zhang Bichen	Guo Jingming	Liu Zhaolun	
4.	"No Heart to Bear a Dream"	无心生大梦	Liu Yuning	Guo Jingming	Lixi Zilin	
5.	"Spring Wind Doesn't Ask"	春风不问	Amber Kuo	Guo Jingming	Philia Lai	
6.	"The Grass and Trees are not Sad"	草木不哀	Hao Meimei	Guo Jingming	Zhang Rui	
7.	"Yuanzhou's Youth"	远舟的少年	Hou Minghao	—N/a	—N/a	Zhao Yuanzhou's theme song
8.	"Spring Wind Doesn't Ask"	春风不问	Chen Duling	—N/a	—N/a	Wen Xiao's theme song
9.	"Don't Miss Don't Think"	不念不想	Tian Jiarui	—N/a	—N/a	Zhuo Yichen's theme song
10.	"Broken Tail Bird"	断尾鸟	Tian Jiarui & Lin Ziye	—N/a	—N/a	Zhuo Yichen & Bai Jiu's theme song
11.	"Accompany Me"	半我	Cheng Xiao & Lai Weiming	—N/a	—N/a	Pei Sijing's theme song
12.	"Heroes Aren't Upright"	英雄不磊落	Xu Zhenxuan	—N/a	—N/a	Ying Lei's theme song
13.	"The World is Without Boundaries"	天地无仑	Yan An	—N/a	—N/a	Li Lun's theme song

== Awards and nominations ==
Year	Award	Category	Result	Ref.
2024	iQIYI Scream Night	Best TV Series of the Year	Won	
2024	Weibo TV Series Awards	Popular TV Series of the Year	Won	

== International Broadcast ==
Network	Country	Ref.
Youtube	International	
iQIYI	International	
FPT Play	Vietnam	
