= Yu Chengen =

Chinese actor and singer (born 1998)

- Born: Yu Chao; September 21, 1998 (age 27); Wuhan, Hubei, China
- Education: Central Academy of Drama
- Occupations: Actor; singer
- Years active: 2019–present
- Agent: EasyPlus Entertainment
- Height: 178 cm (5 ft 10 in)

Chinese name
- Simplified Chinese: 余承恩
- Hanyu Pinyin: Yú Chéngēn

Yu Chao (Chinese: 余超, born September 21, 1997), professionally known as Yu Chengen (Chinese: 余承恩), is a Chinese actor and singer. He rose to prominence for his portrayal of Situ Ling in Love in the Clouds (2025). He is known for his roles in Go Go Squid! (2019), Love Like the Galaxy (2022), and Coroner's Diary (2025), and for participating in the reality survival show Produce Camp 2019, produced by Tencent.

== Discography ==
=== Singles ===
Year	Title	Album
2023	"Do You Still Remember?" (你还记得吗)	Love in a Shadow (明暗关系)

=== Soundtrack appearances ===
Year	Title	Album
2023	"Above the Gamble" (牌局之上)	Killing Game OST
2025	"Snow" (雪) (with Wang Zixuan)	City of Romance OST

== Filmography ==
=== Television series ===
Year	Title	Role	Notes	Ref.
2019	Go Go Squid!	Dai Feng / Demo		
2020	Twisted Fate of Love	Dao Le		
2021	Faith Makes Great	Liu Xinda		
2022	Love Like the Galaxy	Lou Yao		
2023	Young Blood 2	Wen Wuqi		
2023	Killing Game	Wu Yi		
2023	Stand by Me	Chen Jin		
2023	The Heart	Song Xingyan		
2025	City of Romance	Su Yancheng		
2025	Coroner's Diary	Yan Li		
2025	Love in the Clouds	Situ Ling		
2025	Treasure at Dawn	Gu Tian		
TBA	Blade of Vengeance	Guo Ying		
TBA	Zhu Yuan Yu Run Ye Qing Cheng	Qin Che		
TBA	Winner is King	Liao Ran		

=== Television series ===
Year	Title	Role	Notes	Ref.
2019	Produce Camp 2019	Contestant	Finished 28th	
2025	Run for time	Resident Cast		

== Awards and nominations ==
Year	Award	Category	Nominee(s)/Work(s)	Result	Ref.
2025	Weibo TV & Internet Video Summit	Emerging Actor of the Year	Yu Chengen	Won	
