= Zuo Ye =

Chinese actor and singer (born 2001)

- Born: March 18, 2001 (age 24); Chengdu, Sichuan, China
- Other names: Hyman
- Education: Beijing Contemporary Music Academy
- Occupations: Actor; singer
- Years active: 2018–present
- Agent: OACA Entertainment
- Height: 180 cm (5 ft 11 in)
- Musical career
- Genres: Mandopop; Hip hop
- Instrument: Vocals
- Labels: OACA
- Member of: Awaken-F
- Formerly of: S.K.Y

Chinese name
- Simplified Chinese: 左叶
- Hanyu Pinyin: Zuǒ Yè

Zuo Ye (Chinese: 左叶; pinyin: Zuǒ Yè, born March 18, 2001), is a Chinese actor and singer. He debuted as a member of Awaken-F in 2018 and later on participated in the 2020 reality competition show We Are Young where he ranked 5th, making him a member of the debut group S.K.Y. As an actor, he is best known for his roles in My Journey to You (2023) and Fangs of Fortune (2024).

== Discography ==
=== Soundtrack appearances ===
Year	Title	Album
2019	"Never Say Never" (永不言败)	In Youth OST
2023	"The Answer You Give" (你给我的答案)	I Don't Want to Be the Princess OST
2023	"Only Left Me" (只剩我一个人)	I Don't Want to Be the Princess OST

== Filmography ==
=== Films ===
Year	Title	Role	Notes
2020	Wuliang	Gushi	
2021	Clash	Da Fei	

=== Television series ===
Year	Title	Role	Notes	Ref.
2023	Back from the Brink	Feng Qianshuo		
2023	My Journey to You	Young Master Yue		
2023	The Snow Moon	Bo Qiu		
2023	I Don't Want to be the Princess	Chong Liu		
2024	Fangs of Fortune	Fei		
2025	Moonlight Mystique	A Qi		
2025	Fated Hearts	Murong Yao		
2025	Love in the Clouds	Ming Xian	Cameo	
TBA	Hidden Shadow	Baili Quancang		
TBA	Zhan Zhao Adventures	Jin Xuewen		
TBA	Love Travels Through Time	Tan Xi		
TBA	Liang Chen Mei Jin	Chen Xuanqing		

=== Television shows ===
Year	Title	Role	Notes	Ref.
2018	Idol Producer	Contestant	Finished 53rd	
2020	We Are Young	Contestant	Finished 5th	
