= Snuper =

South Korean boy band

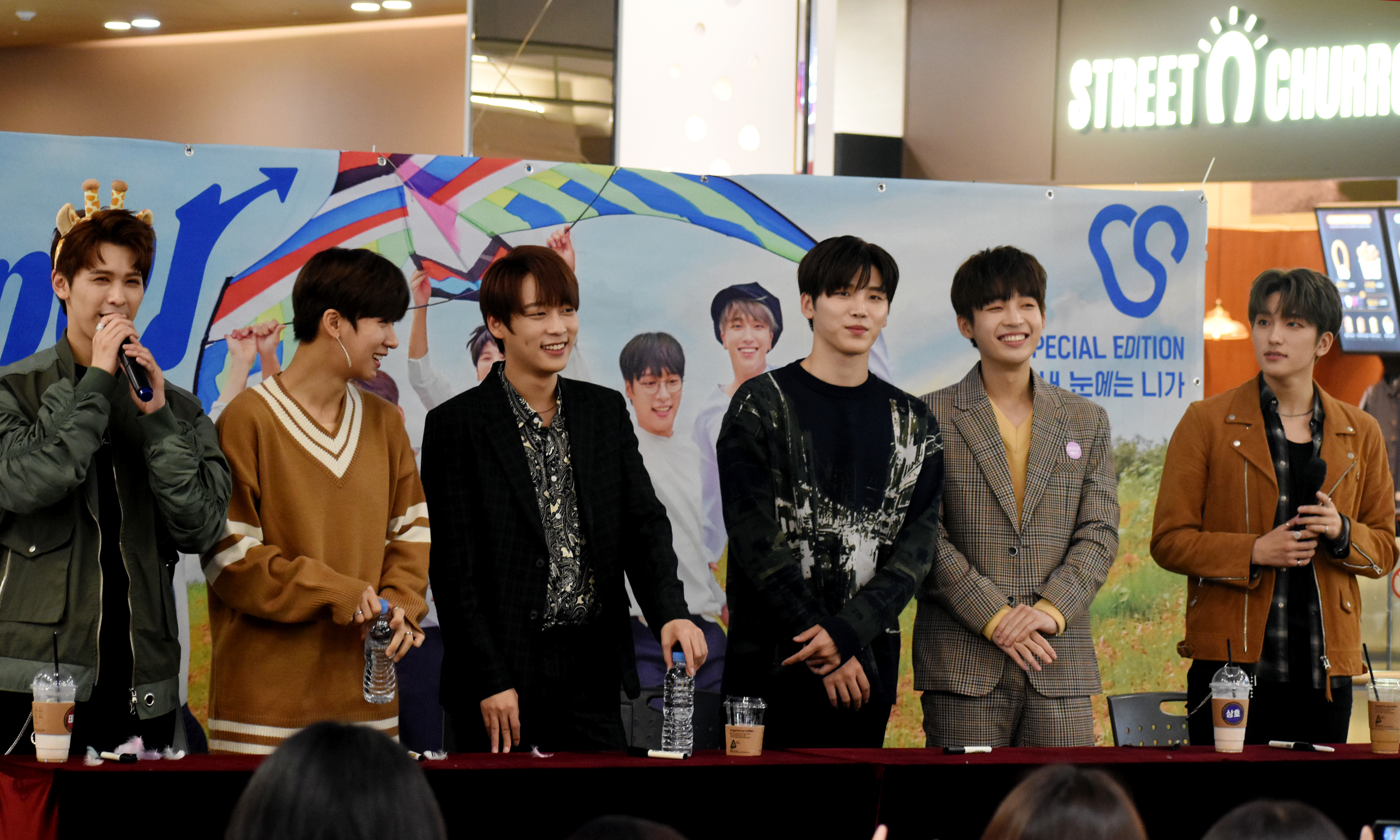
- Snuper at an autograph event at Lotte Mall in Gimpo, October 2018. Left to right: Taewoong, Suhyun, Sangil, Woosung, Sangho, and Sebin

Background information
- Origin: Seoul, South Korea
- Genres: K-pop; synthpop; dance-pop; ballad
- Years active: 2015–2023
- Labels: Widmay Entertainment
- Past members: Suhyun; Taewoong; Woosung; Sangho; Sangil; Sebin
- Website: snuper.kr

Snuper (Korean: 스누퍼; meaning "Higher than Super") was a South Korean boy band formed by Widmay Entertainment in 2015, the first Korean pop group from the label. They debuted on November 16, 2015, with the extended play Shall We with the title track "Shall We Dance." The group consisted of six members: Suhyun, Sangil, Taewoong, Woosung, Sangho, and Sebin.

Since 2020, they had been on hiatus to allow the members to complete their mandatory military service. During that time, Sebin joined the group Omega X.

On May 3, 2023, Snuper officially disbanded after the members' contracts with the company ended.

== Members ==
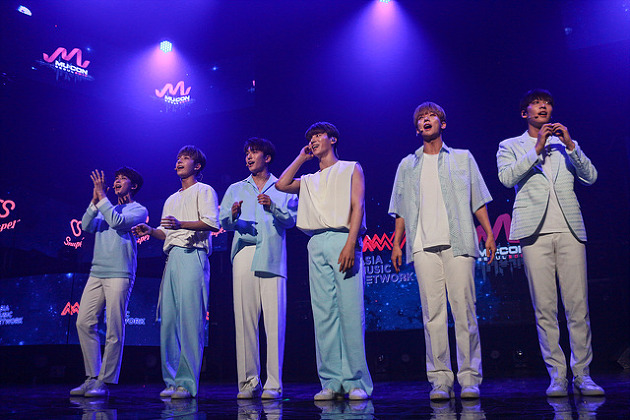
Snuper in 2017

- Suhyun (수현)
- Sangil (상일)
- Taewoong (태웅)
- Woosung (우성)
- Sangho (상호)
- Sebin (세빈)

== Discography ==
=== Compilation albums ===
Title	Album details	Peak chart positions	Sales
Title	Album details	JPN	Sales
Swing	Released: December 11, 2019; Label: KISS Entertainment; Formats: CD, digital download; Track listing: 1. BIG AIR; 2. You═Heaven (Japanese Ver.); 3. Oh Yeah!!; 4. Stand by me 5. UNIVERSE; 6. Weekend Secret; 7. Come Over; 8. Smile again 9. Natsuno Magic (夏の Magic); 10. Nanairodays (七色デイズ); 11. Remember You; 12. CRYSTAL AVENUE; 13. Itsudemo (七色デイズ)	11	JPN: 8,307

=== Extended plays ===
Title	Album details	Peak chart positions		Sales
Title	Album details	KOR	JPN	Sales
Shall We	Released: November 16, 2015; Label: Widmay Entertainment, CJ E&M; Formats: CD, digital download; Track listing: 1. Shall We (쉘 위) intro 2. Shall We Dance (쉘 위 댄스); 3. Polaroid (폴라로이드); 4. Hyde Jekyll (하이드 지킬) 80's Remix; 5. Shall We Dance (쉘 위 댄스) inst.	28	—	KOR: 823+
Platonic Love	Released: March 8, 2016; Label: Widmay Entertainment, LOEN Entertainment; Formats: CD, digital download; Track listing: 1. You Are (너는) intro 2. 4th Dimensional Angels (4차원의 천사); 3. Platonic Love (지켜줄게); 4. Yes Or No; 5. U 6. Platonic Love (지켜줄게) inst.	13	—	KOR: 2,758+
Rain of Mind	Released: November 15, 2016; Label: Widmay Entertainment, LOEN Entertainment; Formats: CD, digital download; Track listing: 1. Rain of Mind intro 2. It's Raining; 3. So Much In Love (쓰다); 4. Lucky (럭키); 5. Please Don't (나를 보내지마); 6. It's Raining inst.	8	—	KOR: 12,944+
I Wanna?	Released: April 24, 2017; Label: Widmay Entertainment, Interpark; Formats: CD, digital download; Track listing: 1. Hide And Seek; 2. Back:Hug (백허그); 3. My girl's fox (내 여자의 여우짓); 4. I’ll Do It (해줄게); 5. Back:Hug (백허그) inst.	4	—	KOR: 23,616+; JPN: 5,876+
I Wanna?	Re-released: July 20, 2017 (The Star of Stars); Label: Widmay Entertainment, Interpark; Formats: CD, digital download; Track listing: 1. Intro: The Star Of Stars; 2. The Star of Stars (유성); 3. Hide And Seek; 4. Back:Hug (백허그); 5. My girl's fox (내 여자의 여우짓); 6. I’ll Do It (해줄게); 7. The Star of Stars (유성) inst.; 8. (Bonus Track) Platonic Love (지켜줄게) (Remix)	4	—	KOR: 20,731+
Blossom	Released: April 24, 2018; Label: Widmay Entertainment, Interpark; Formats: CD, digital download; Track listing: 1. Blossom (Intro); 2. Tulips (튤립); 3. You In My Eyes (내 눈에는 니가); 4. VV (Very Very); 5. Wonderland; 6. Tulips (튤립) inst.	4	30	KOR: 17,596+; JPN: 2,935+
You in My Eyes (SNUPER Special Edition)	Released: October 8, 2018; Label: Widmay Entertainment, Interpark; Formats: CD, digital download; Track listing: 1. You In My Eyes (Special Edition) (내 눈에는 니가); 2. Starry Winter Night (별이 빛나는 겨울밤); 3. Nanairo Days (Korean Ver.); 4. Tulips (튤립) (Piano Ver.); 5. You In My Eyes (Special Edition) (내 눈에는 니가) inst.	4	—	KOR: 17,063+
Weekend Secret	Released: January 30, 2019; Label: Kiss Entertainment; Formats: CD, digital download; Track listing: 1. Weekend Secret; 2. Where; 3. Bling Sky; 4. Sakurasakukonokisetsu; 5. Weekend Secret (Inst.)	—	—	TBA
Come Over	Released: August 14, 2019; Label: Kiss Entertainment; Formats: CD, digital download; Track listing: 1. Come Over; 2. Natsunoyume; 3. Girls Girls Girls; 4. Kissing You; 5. Come Over (Inst.)	—	—	TBA
"—" denotes releases that did not chart or were not released in that region.

=== Singles ===
Title	Year	Peak chart positions		Sales	Album
Title	Year	KOR	JPN	Sales	Album
Korean
"Shall We Dance" (쉘 위 댄스)	2015	—	—		Shall We
"Polaroid" (폴라로이드)	2015	—	—		Shall We
"Platonic Love" (지켜줄게)	2016	—	—		Platonic Love
"You=Heaven" (너=천국)	2016	—	—	KOR: 4,967+ (CD)	Compass
"It's Raining"	2016	—	—		Rain of Mind
"Back:Hug" (백허그)	2017	—	—		I Wanna?
"The Star of Stars" (유성)	2017	—	—		The Star of Stars
"Dear"	2017	—	—	KOR: 1,790+ (CD)	Dear
"Tulips"	2018	—	—		Blossom
"You in My Eyes (Special Edition) (내 눈에는 니가)"	2018	—	—		You In My Eyes (SNUPER Special Edition)
Japanese
"You=Heaven"	2016	—	13	JPN: 17,013 (CD)	Swing
"Oh Yeah"	2017	—	3	JPN: 32,562 (CD)	Swing
"Stand by Me"	2017	—	3	JPN: 33,554 (CD)	Swing
"Summer Magic" (夏のMagic)	2018	—	8	JPN: 20,538 (CD)	Swing
"Weekend Secret"	2019	—	8	JPN: 19,026 (CD)	Swing
"Come Over"	2019	—	3	JPN: 15,582 (CD)	Swing
"Oxygen"	2020	—	—	—	Swing
"—" denotes releases that did not chart or were not released in that region.

=== Soundtrack appearances ===
Year	Title	Drama
2015	"Hyde Jekyll"	Hyde Jekyll, Me OST Part 7
2016	"Oh My Venus"	Oh My Venus OST Part 8
2018	"The Maze"	When Time Stopped OST Part 4

== Filmography ==
- Snuper Project (2016)

== Awards and nominations ==
=== Asia Model Awards ===
Year	Nominee / work	Award	Result
2016	Snuper	Model Special Award	Won

=== Asia Artist Awards ===
Year	Nominee / work	Award	Result
2017	Snuper	New Wave Award	Won
2018	Snuper	Choice Award	Won
2019	Snuper	Potential Award	Won
