= REF =

'Ref or REF may refer to:

== People with the name ==
- Ref, pseudonym of Belgian comics artist René Follet
- Ref Sanchez (1917–1986), American actor and photographer

== Arts, entertainment, and media ==
- The Marriage Ref (U.S. TV series), 2010
- The Ref, a 1994 film
- "Ref" (song) by OsamaSon from Jump Out, 2025

== Organizations ==
- Rapid Equipping Force, or REF, a US Army unit
- Renewable Energy Foundation, or REF, an independent energy think-tank in the UK
- Réseau des Émetteurs Français, or REF, a French organization for amateur radio enthusiasts
- Roma Education Fund, or REF
- Reform UK, a British political party (abbreviated REF in election results)

== Other uses ==
- Referee, or ref, in sport
- Research Excellence Framework, or REF, a UK higher education research impact evaluation
- Row echelon form, or REF, a possible form of a matrix
- Git reference, indicates the location of commits
