= He Yu =

Chinese actor (born 1996)

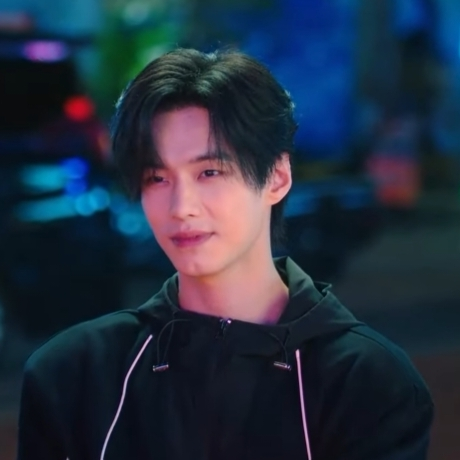
- He for the drama Speed and Love in 2025
- Born: He Yiqian; August 26, 1996 (age 29); Yinchuan, Ningxia, China
- Other names: Nick He, He Haipei
- Education: Chongqing University
- Occupation: Actor
- Years active: 2018–present
- Agent: Star Agency
- Height: 183 cm (6 ft 0 in)

Chinese name
- Simplified Chinese: 何与
- Hanyu Pinyin: Hé Yǔ

He Yiqian (Chinese: 何宜谦; pinyin: Hé Yíqiān, born August 26, 1996), professionally known as He Yu (Chinese: 何与; pinyin: Hé Yǔ), is a Chinese actor of Hui ethnicity. He is best known for his lead roles in Paladin Legend (2024), Dashing Youth (2024), Speed and Love (2025) and Blossoms of Power (2026).

== Early life and education ==
He Yu was born He Yiqian on August 26, 1996, in Yinchuan, Ningxia, China. He graduated from Chongqing University majoring in Architecture.

== Discography ==
=== Soundtrack appearances ===
Year	Title	Album
2024	"Travel with You in the Mortal World" (共赴人间一趟) (with Hou Minghao, Xia Zhiguang, Bai Shu, and Zhang Chenxiao)	Dashing Youth OST
2025	"Para Para Sakura" (Yu Shuxin, Mike Angelo, and Patrick Nattawat Finkler)	Speed and Love OST

== Filmography ==
=== Films ===
Year	Title	Role	Notes	Ref.
2022	The Prodigal Son	Zhou Chu		

=== Television series ===
Year	Title		Role	Network	Notes	Ref.
Year	English	Chinese	Role	Network	Notes	Ref.
2019	Lovely Swords Girl	恋恋江湖	Aide Yushu	iQIYI		
2020	The Day I Skipped School for You	教室的那一间	Zhao Qiaofei	iQIYI	Season 2–3	
2021	The Most Beautiful You in the World	世界上最动听的你	Liang Cheng	Tencent Video		
2021	My Fated Boy	我的邻居长不大	Lu Zheng'an	Youku		
2021	Sweet Sweet	住我对面的小哥哥	Wang Yanyi	Tencent Video		
2022	Let's Meet Now	见面吧就现在	Zhou Ziqian	iQIYI		
2022	So Funny Youth	当你年少时	Zhu Chenghai	Youku		
2022	The Legend of Young Justice Bao	新少年包拯	Gongsun Ce	Youku		
2024	The Legend of Shen Li	与凤行	Lord Fu Rong	Tencent Video		
2024	Paladin Legend	又见逍遥	Li Xiaoyao	Tencent Video	Also titled as Sword and Fairy	
2024	The Legend of Heroes: Hot Blooded	铁血丹心	Chen Xuanfeng	Tencent Video	Cameo	
2024	Dashing Youth	少年白马醉春风	Ye Dingzhi	Youku		
2024	Blossom	九重紫	Young Emperor	Tencent Video	Cameo	
2025	Be Passionately in Love	陷入我们的热恋	Jiang Yu	Tencent Video		
2025	The Legend of Heroes: Nine Yin True Sutra	九阴真经	Chen Xuanfeng	Tencent Video		
2025	Speed and Love	双轨	Jin Zhao	iQIYI		
2026	Blossoms of Power	百花杀	Xiao Huayong	Tencent Video		
TBA	The Guardian Liu Hengshun	真火神探刘横顺	Li Zilong	Youku		
TBA	Good Night	此处通往繁星	Wang Muyun	Youku	Cameo	
TBA	Reborn of the Rightful	窈窈有期	Xiao Jingxi	iQIYI		

== Awards and nominations ==
Year	Award	Category	Nominee(s)/Work(s)	Result	Ref.
2025	iQIYI Scream Night	Asia Pacific Newcomer Actor of the Year	He Yu	Won	
