= Quan Yilun =

Chinese actor (born 1999)

- Born: April 29, 1999 (age 27); Wenzhou, Zhejiang, China
- Education: Communication University of China, Nanjing
- Occupation: Actor
- Years active: 2020–present

Chinese name
- Simplified Chinese: 全伊伦
- Hanyu Pinyin: Quán Yīlún

Quan Yilun (Chinese: 全伊伦; pinyin: Quán Yīlún, born April 29, 1999) is a Chinese actor. He gained popularity for his lead role in Echoes of the Self (2025) and supporting role in Love in the Clouds (2025). He is also well-known for his roles in Blossom (2024), and Moonlight Mystique (2025).

== Filmography ==
=== Television series ===
Year	Title	Role	Notes	Ref.
2020	Meeting You	Gao Ting		
2022	Xin Gu	Tang Yu Xiao Bao		
2022	It's Nothing More Than Love	Son-in-law		
2022	Since I Met You	Sun Xianning		
2022	Wan Ren Ge Shao Nv	Yuan Mo		
2023	An Ancient Love Song	Lu Shi		
2023	I Am Nobody	Lv Gong		
2023	Legend of the Magic Jade 2	Zhou Xuecheng		
2024	Blossom	Wu Shan		
2025	Moonlight Mystique	Rong Xian		
2025	The Legend of Zang Hai	New Emperor		
2025	Youthful Glory	Shu Jingran		
2025	Moonlit Reunion	Bai Cha	Cameo	
2025	Echoes of the Self	Li Yan		
2025	Love in the Clouds	Yan Xiao		
2026	Tigers Sniff the Rose	Liu Wenji		
TBA	In the Moonlight	Li Weizhen		
TBA	Journey to the End of the Night	Yun Ting		
TBA	The Legend of Lu Xiaofeng	Hua Manlou		
