= Hou Minghao =

Chinese actor and singer (born 1997)

- 侯明昊
- Born: 3 August 1997 (age 29); Beijing, China
- Other name: Neo Hou
- Education: Beijing Contemporary Music Academy
- Occupations: Actor; singer
- Years active: 2014–present
- Agent(s): BG Talent, Hesong Entertainment, Hou Minghao Studio
- Height: 179 cm (5 ft 10 in)
- Website: Hou Minghao's Weibo

Hou Minghao (Chinese: 侯明昊, born 3 August 1997 in Beijing, China), also known as Neo Hou, is a Chinese actor and singer. He is best known for his roles in hit television dramas like When We Were Young, Fangs of Fortune, Dashing Youth and Love in the Clouds.

== Career ==
=== Pre-debut ===
In 2012, Hou joined SM Entertainment as a trainee, however he returned to China after a year and a half of training.

=== 2014–2017: Debut and solo career ===
In July 2014, Hou participated in the draft competition "Boss Shang's Trainee" and eventually became a trainee of Shang Wenjie's Studio. The studio later established as BG Talent's agency. On 12 December of the same year, Fresh Teenager Geek officially debuted and released their first album UP 4 U.

In November 2015, he starred in the black humorous absurd comedy film Frightened Bird, in which he played as Su Niu.

On 10 January 2016, Hou's studio announced that he had completed his credits during his debut as a trainee and officially graduated and began to develop his acting career as an independent person. On 22 January, he joined the variety show Day Day Up of Hunan TV as "Little Brother", which gained attention and popularity in the program. On 11 July, he released his first single "Super Nanny Dad" for variety show Let Go of My Baby. On 24 September, the web drama series Rakshasa Street started filming in Hengdian. On 4 November, the movie Funny Soccer was released in China, he played Xiao Shuai, an inspirational and funny boy with a habit of cleanliness in the film. On 16 November, the shooting for Cambrian Period began, he was announced as their main lead. On 29 November, he starred in the romantic comedy web movie Angel Institute, playing a punk rock teenager in the film.

On 15 February 2017 Hou was announced as main lead for Inference Notes. On 31 March, he played a high-IQ genius boy, Tang Chuan in the suspense movie The Devotion of Suspect X, which has attracted attention for its performance and interpretation. On 9 May, the web series Cambrian Period was broadcast, where he played a ruthless killer. The series achieved 1.3 billion views at the end of its run. On 2 August, the web drama Rakshasa Street was broadcast, where he acted in ancient costumes for the first time, and played Bai Jingxuan. In September, he starred in television series The Monkey King: Land of Beauty. On 3 November, the suspense web series Inference Notes was broadcast where he played the role of Mi Kaka. On 28 December, he was announced as the main lead for the drama series When We Were Young.

=== 2018–2022: Career progression ===
On 14 March 2018, he released his first all-English single "You Mean Everything To Me", which he personally planned and prepared for a year, a gift to fans on White Valentine's Day. On 17 April, he was announced as main lead for The Lost Tomb 2: Explore with the Note. On 22 November, the youth campus drama When We Were Young was broadcast, in which he played the role of Hua Biao, a passionate and righteous science genius. The series ended with 1.8 billion views.

On 17 January 2019, Hou was announced as the main lead for drama series Psych-Hunter. On April, he starred in series A Chinese Ghost Story with Zheng Shuang, however due to her controversy, the series was banned from broadcast with unknown release date. On 6 June, the adventure drama The Lost Tomb 2: Explore with the Note was broadcast on Tencent Video. He played Wu Xie. The total number of plays of the drama successfully exceeded 4.15 billion views on Tencent Video, becoming the best in the summer program at that time. On 28 June, the film Over Again was released, in which he played the role of the passionate and "daring" teenager Gao Silin.

On 12 June 2020, the drama series A Girl Like Me announced their cast lineup and Hou was one of their lead. On 28 June, he starred in the TV series Reading Class, he played Lu Xingchen. However, this series have uncertain release date due to Song Zu'er's tax evasion scandal. On 23 November, the suspense detective drama Psych-Hunter was broadcast, in which he played the role of Jiang Shuo, a house buyer with amnesia.

On 18 January 2021, TV series A Girl Like Me was broadcast on Tencent Video, in which he played the role of Rong Xian. By the end, the series has exceeded 1.6 billion views. On 4 May, the series Faith Makes Great was broadcast. On 14 June, he was announced as one of the lineup for TV Series Hu Tong. On 14 August, he was announced as main lead for drama series Back From the Brink. On 14 September, the drama Our Times starring him was broadcast on Tencent Video. The series has achieved 1.9 billion views. On 21 October, the TV series People's Property began broadcasting. The series earned 1.6 billion views. On 27 December, Hesong Entertainment officially announced Hou has joined their agency.

On 6 July 2022, Hou was announced as one of the main lead for Young Babylon. On 25 September, Hu Tong was broadcast on various platforms Mango TV, Tencent Video, and CCTV-8. The series has achieved 1.27 billion views.

=== 2023–present ===
On 5 May 2023, Hou was announced as one of the lineup for drama series I Am Nobody. On 9 May, the television series Back from the Brink was broadcast, in which he played Tian Yao. The drama is adapted from the novel of the same name by Jiulu Feixiang and was exclusively broadcast on Youku. The number of pre-broadcast reservations for the drama reached 3.39 million, and the popularity of playback on Youku after the broadcast exceeded 10,000, occupying the first place in various lists on Youku for many times. On 13 May, he started filming for drama series Dashing Youth. On 28 July, the movie Hidden Strike was launched on Netflix. On 4 August, the urban fantasy drama I Am Nobody was broadcast, in which he played Wang Ye, a Taoist priest. The drama received positive reviews from the critics and audience. The series exceeded 10,000 index heat and achieved 1 billion views on Youku. On 1 October, the series Fangs of Fortune started filming with Hou as the main lead. On 5 December, he participated in the TV series Love in Pavilion as cameo and played the role of Demon King Baimu Yaojun.

On 19 February 2024, he participated in filming of I Am Nobody: The Showdown Between Yin & Yang. On 24 February, Hou was announced as the main lead in the TV series The Unclouded Soul, in which he played the role of Hong Ye, the king of demons, who was respected by all demons and feared by the human race. On 29 April, the TV series Young Babylon was broadcast on Tencent Video and Mango TV. The play is adapted from the novel of the same name. It tells the story of a group of young people pursuing love, friendship, dreams and growth in a small coastal town in the southeast of the 1990s. The series earned 503 million views on Tencent Video and Mango TV. On 19 July, the TV series Dashing Youth was broadcast on Youku. It tells the story of Baili Dongjun, who loves to make wine, embarked on the world because of the agreement with his childhood friend Ye Dingzhi. The series exceeded 10,000 index heat and achieved 1.98 billion views on Youku. On 31 August, he was announced as the male lead for the xianxia TV series Love in the Clouds, playing Ji Bozai. The series is adapted from the novel of the same name by Bailu Chengshuang. It tells the story of Ji Bozai, a polar star abys fighter from a criminal prisoner, who defeated Mingyi, the cold god of war, who had won for seven consecutive years, at the annual "Qingyun Conference" of Hexu Six Realms. On 4 September, the variety show Divas Hit the Road Season 6 was aired on Mango TV, by the end of its run, the show has attracted 4.3 billion views. On 26 October, the drama series Fangs of Fortune was broadcast on iQIYI where he played the role of Zhao Yuanzhou. The series exceeded 8,734 index heat and topped many rankings charts in China, and his role as Zhao Yuanzhou's popularity is the first reached 300,000 on Douyin Character List. The series has achieved 1.35 billion views on iQIYI.

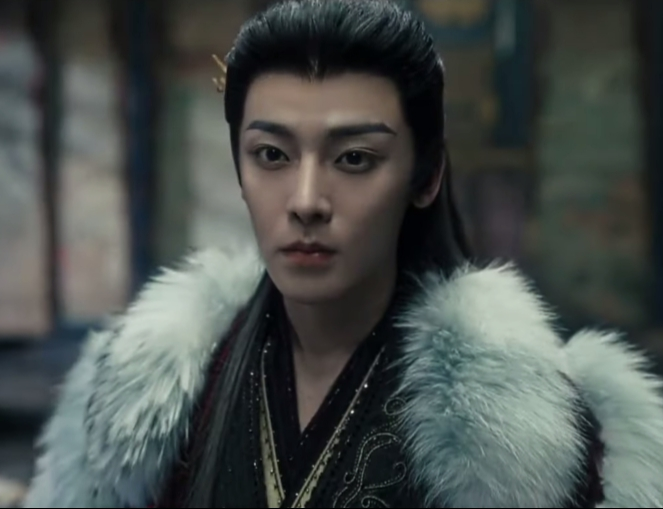
Hou Minghao for Fangs of Fortune

I Am Nobody: The Showdown Between Yin & Yang was broadcast on 18 January 2025, with 13 episodes. The number of pre-broadcast reservations for the drama reached 4.5 million on Youku. The series has exceeded 10,000 index heat and achieved 1 billion views. On 13 March, he was announced as the male lead for TV series Glory, acted as Lu Jiang Lai, young rising magistrate. On 28 April, Love in Pavilion was broadcast on iQIYI. On 15 July, Hou was announced as the mainland for the drama series Key to the Phoenix Heart, he played Xiao Wu Yi, the cold and ruthless commander general of Northern army. On 8 October, the series Love in The Clouds was broadcast on Youku, where it had gained 2 million pre-registrations before release. The show surpassed a heat index of 10,000 and achieved a 15.5% market share, receiving over 400 million effective views within 2 weeks of release. It achieved 1.64 billion views. On 27 November 2025, he was announced as the lead actor in the series Immortalis. He will be playing the role of Yang Wu Jian. On 27 December, The Unclouded Soul was aired on iQiyi, Youku, WeTV, and CCTV 8, with 1.21 billion views. The series Glory was also aired on Hunan TV and Mango TV on 29 December and achieved 4.5 billion views.

On 11 July 2026, Key to the Phoenix Heart was broadcast on iQIYI with 28 episodes.

== Personal life ==
Hou grew up in the military college. He studied at Beijing Contemporary Music Academy in middle school. He likes reading, baking, motorcycles, and sports, especially basketball. He opened a basketball court called FAD3-AWAY in Hengdian, where many celebrities joined in playing there. He has studied accordion for 8 years, he can also play other music instruments such as drums kit, guitar, and piano.

== Other ventures ==
=== Endorsements and ambassadorships ===
Endorsements

In 2017, he was announced as brand friend for MG and Kenzo. In 2018, he was promoted as brand ambassador for MG, and became brand ambassador for Aquair. In 2019, he was announced as spokesperson for Wetcode, HN-2, Nivea, Mediheal, DHC, Ulike. On the same year, he became brand ambassador for Avene. In 2020, he was announced as brand ambassador for Mamonde, Furla, also as McDonald's experience ambassador and Geoskincare spokesperson. In March 2021, he was announced as brand ambassador for su:m37°. On 25 May, he was announced as Nest Global spokesperson. On September, he became brand friend for Montblanc and spokesperson for Little Red Riding Hood. On October, he was announced global spokesperson for ZEAL and spokesperson for HLA.

In January 2022, he became brand friend for SergioRossi. On 11 April, he was announced as brand ambassador for Pepsi. On the same month, he was promoted as fragrance brand ambassador for Montblanc. On 28 June, Bamboo Salt announced him as their brand ambassador. On September, he was announced as Yili Xinhuo brand ambassador; as well as Hisense TV and Vidda brand spokesperson. On 26 October, Remy Martin announced Hou as their brand friend. On 11 November, he was announced brand ambassador for Canban. On 29 December, he became brand friend for Dior. In February 2023, Hou was announced as Buttons brand ambassador. On May, he became brand ambassador for Mageline and experience officer for Xiaomi. On 29 July, he announced his own clothing brand FAD3-AWAY. On 2 August, he became brand spokesperson for Mark Fairwhale. On September, he was announced as brand ambassador for Lukfook, Zhuben, and Yili Milk Powder.

In January 2024, he became brand ambassador for Eggy Party video game. On 24 February, he was announced as spokesperson for Dermalogica facial mask. On 2 March, Freeplus officially announced Hou as their brand's streamlined skin care spokesperson. On 24 April, he was promoted as brand ambassador for luxury brand Montblanc. On 9 May, Marie Dalgar officially announced Hou as their first brand's base makeup spokesperson. On 27 June, Echolac announced him as their brand luggage spokesperson. On 26 August, he was announced as brand spokesperson for skin care Dr Yu. On 5 September, he was promoted as Crocs China spokesperson. On the same month, he was announced as Fila Fusion fashion brand ambassador and Glico brand spokesperson. On October, he was announced as MEDM brand ambassador. Later of that month, he became brand ambassador for luxury jewellery brand Fred, and also spokesperson for tea brand Rangcha.

On 8 January 2025, he was announced as ambassador for national brand Blue Moon. On 4 March, luxury brand Versace appointed Hou as its Fragrance spokesperson. On 13 July, he came spokesperson for Yee3. On 7 November, he was announced as the brand ambassador of ORA Cars. On 5 December, he was announced as the brand ambassador of Haidilao Hot pot.

Recognitions

Huo has appeared on various magazines such as Lifestyle, Men Health, Nandu, Men's Uno, CQ, Nylon, Grazia, Wonderland, Elle Men, and Bazaar.

=== Philanthropy ===
On 3 August 2017, he donated 1,083 seedlings suitable for growing in the desert through the "Million Forest" public welfare project of the China Green Foundation to help protect the environment, he is named as their Young Health Ambassador. During the COVID-19 pandemic, Hou donated 200,000 yuan to the medical staff in Wuhan and surrounding cities. An additional of donations went towards ambulance service.

In July 2021, Hou donated 300,000 yuan to help with flood relief in Henan. On 20 June 2022, PADI AWARE Foundation announced him as their Environmental Protection Ambassador. On 20 December 2023, Hou donated materials like books and sports supplies to students at Tuishan Primary School.

On 8 January 2025, Hou donated to Chinese Relief and Welfare Development Foundation to assist in Tibet's earthquake relief.

In November 2025, Hou donated 1 million yuan to the Hong Kong fire relief efforts.

== Discography ==
=== Singles ===
Year	English title	Chinese title	Album	Notes/Ref.
2016	"Super Nanny Dad"	超能奶爸	Let Go of My Baby OST	
2016	"North East Direction"	东南方	Angel Institute OST	
2017	"Face Mask"	脸谱	Cambrian Period OST	
2018	"You Mean Everything To Me"	你的意义	N/A	
2018	"In Youth"	少年时	When We Were Young OST	
2018	"Companion"	相伴	When We Were Young OST	
2018	"When We Were Young"	人不彪悍枉少年	When We Were Young OST	
2018	"Sui Yue Bu Dai Ren"	岁月不待人	Everlasting Classics	
2019	"My Motherland and I"	我和我的祖国	Qing Chun Wei Zu Guo Er Chang	
2019	"In Youth"	正青春	Qing Chun Wei Zu Guo Er Chang	
2019	"Living like Raging Wave"	生如狂澜	The Lost Tomb II: Explore with the Note OST	With Cheng Yi, Zhang Boyu
2019	"Meeting Again in the Future"	后会有期	The Lost Tomb II: Explore with the Note OST	
2020	"Classmate"	同学	Beijing Satellite TV 2019 Global New Year's Eve Ice and Snow Festival	with Song Zu'er
2021	"Howling Wind"	呼啸的风	Our Times OST	
2021	"Flower Letter"	花信	A Girl Like Me OST	
2021	"Wind Flower"	风花	A Girl Like Me OST	with Guan Xiaotong
2021	"Parallel Tracks"	平行轨迹	When We Write Love Story OST	With Yang Chaoyue
2022	"Victory"	战胜	Beijing Winter Olympics	
2023	"Enlightenment"	启明星	Back From the Brink OST	
2023	"Changes of Days & Weeks"	周天之变	I Am Nobody OST	With Wang Tianruo
2024	"A Trip to Mortal World"	侯明昊	Dashing Youth OST	With He Yu, Xia Zhiguang, Bai Shu, Zhang Chenxiao
2024	"When The Moon is Lit"	月半明时	Dashing Youth OST	
2024	"Yuan Zhou's Youth"	远舟的少年	Fangs of Fortune OST	
2024	"Little Verse"	小诗句	Fangs of Fortune OST	With Chen Duling, Tian Jiarui, Cheng Xiao, Lin Ziye, Xu Zhenxuan, Yan An & Lai Weiming
2025	"Zither Chant"	琴吟	Qin yin	148
2025	"If Your World Had No Sunshine"	若你的世界没有暖阳	Love in the Clouds OST	149
2025	"Afraid It's Only a Dream"	怕是一场梦	Unclouded Soul OST	150
2025	"The Light of Love"	爱的光明	Glory OST	151
2025	"Descend"	落	Glory OST	152
2026	"A Promise Becomes a River"	诺成川	Key to the Phoenix Heart OST	153
2026	Scorching Light	炙光	Key to the Phoenix Heart OST	154
2026	How Can I	怎么能	Zěnme néng	155

== Filmography ==
=== Film ===
Year	English title	Chinese title	Role	Networks	Notes/Ref.
2016	Funny Soccer	笑林足球	Xiao Shuai		Support Role
2016	Angel Institute	天使学院的爱情战记	Xiao Minghao	Huashi TV	Main Role
2017	The Devotion of Suspect X	嫌疑人x的献身	Tang Chuan (Young)	Tencent Video	Support Role
2019	Over Again	回到过去拥抱你	Gao Silin	CCTV 6	Main Role
2020	Think Like a Dog	家有儿女之神犬当家	Xiao	Netflix	Support Role
2023	Hidden Strike	狂怒沙暴	Assistant Ning	Netflix	Support Role
TBA	Frightened Bird	惊弓之鸟	Su Niu		

=== Television series ===
Year	English title	Chinese title	Role	Network	Notes
2017	Cambrian Period	寒武纪	Jian Zi	Youku	
2017	Rakshasa Street	镇魂街	Bai Jingxuan	Youku	Support role
2017	Inference Notes	推理笔记	Mi Kaka	Youku	
2018	When We Were Young	人不彪悍枉少年	Hua Biao	Tencent	
2019	The Lost Tomb 2: Explore with the Note	怒海潜沙&秦岭神树	Wu Xie	Tencent	
2020	Psych-Hunter	心宅猎人	Jiang Shuo	iQIYI	
2021	A Girl Like Me	我就是这般女子	Rong Xia	Tencent	
2021	Faith Makes Great	理想照耀中国	Cai Bozhen	Mango TV	Support role
2021	Our Times	启航：当风起时	Pei Qinghua	Tencent	
2021	People's Property	突围	Lin Xiaowei	iQIYI, Tencent, Youku	Support role
2022	Hu Tong	胡同	Tie Dan	CCTV-8, Mango TV	
2023	Back from the Brink	护心	Tian Yao	Youku	
2023	I Am Nobody	异人之下	Wang Ye	Youku	
2024	Young Babylon	少年巴比伦	Lu Xiaolu	Tencent, Mango TV	
2024	Dashing Youth	少年白马醉春风	Baili Dongjun	Youku	
2024	Fangs of Fortune	大梦归离	Zhao Yuanzhou / Zhu Yan / Lord Ying Long	iQIYI	
2025	I Am Nobody: The Showdown Between Yin & Yang	异人之下之决战! 碧游村	Wang Ye	Youku	
2025	Love in Pavilion	淮水竹亭	Baimu Yaojun	iQIYI	Cameo
2025	Love in the Clouds	入青云	Ji Bozai	Youku	
2025	The Unclouded Soul	逍遥	Hong Ye	CCTV 8, iQIYI, Youku, WeTV	
2025	Glory	玉茗茶骨	Lu Jianglai	Hunan TV, Mango TV, iQIYI	
2026	Key to the Phoenix Heart	雀骨	Xiao Wuyi	iQIYI	
Cancelled	A Chinese Ghost Story	只问今生恋沧溟	Ning Caichen		
TBA	The Monkey King: Land of Beauty	好女无双（西游记女儿国	Tang Seng / Jiang Liuer		
TBA	Reading Class	阅读课	Lu Xingchen	iQIYI	
TBA	Immortalis	碧血蝉	Yang Wu Jian	iQIYI	
TBA	Longing for My Beloved	长生骨	Rong Chen Zi / Star Lord Lu Cun		

=== Variety shows ===
Year	English title	Chinese title	Role	Networks	Notes/Ref.
2016	Fresh Sunday	透鲜滴星期天	Cast member	Hunan TV	
2016	Let Go of My Baby	放开我北鼻	Cast member	Tencent Video	
2016	Sunshine Art Fitness	阳光艺体能	Cast member	Hubei Satellite TV	
2018	Shake It Up	新舞林大会	Cast member	Dragon TV	
2018	Super Penguin League	超级企鹅联盟	Cast member	Tencent Video	
2019	Ultimate Master	终极高手	Cast member	Tencent Video	
2020	When We Write Love Story	平行时空遇见你	Cast member	Tencent Video	
2021	Dunk of China Season 4	这！就是灌篮 第四季	Cast member	Youku	
2024	Tenday	十天之后回到现实	Cast member	iQIYI	
2024	Go! Dashing Youth	少年白马醉春风特别企划	Cast member	Youku	
2024	Divas Hit the Road Season 6	花儿与少年 第六季	Cast member	Mango TV	

== Awards and nominations ==
Year	Award	Category	Result	Ref.
2016	FHM 12th Anniversary Night	The Most Potential Newcomer Award	Won	
2016	Fashion Up Night	The Most UP Newcomer of the Year Award	Won	
2016	iFeng Fashion Choice Awards	Favorite Icon of the Year Award	Won	
2016	iFeng Fashion Choice Awards	Fashion Dynamic Pioneer of the Year	Won	
2016	OK Magazine 4th Anniversary Award Ceremony	The New Generation of Actor of the Year	Won	
2017	2nd Golden Guduo Media Awards	Most Popular Actor (Web series)	Won	
2017	Golden Bud Network Film and Television Festival	Most Popular Online Drama Actor of the Year	Won	
2017	Weibo TV Online Video Awards	New Artist of the Year	Won	
2018	Weibo Night	Enterprising Artist of the Year	Won	
2018	Style Anniversary Ceremony	Breakthrough Actor of the Year Award	Won	
2018	12th Tencent Video Star Awards	Potential TV Series Actor Award	Won	
2018	15th Esquire China's Man At His Best Awards	Charity Ambassador of the Year	Won	
2019	iFeng Fashion Choice Awards	Fashion Dynamic Pioneer of the Year	Won	
2019	Sina Fashion Awards	Youthful Idol of the Year	Won	
2019	Madame Figaro Fashion Awards	Public Welfare Idol of the Year	Won	
2020	China 2020 TV Literary Pioneer List Star Ceremony	The Most Potential All-round Artist	Won	
2020	Boutique Style Festival	The Most Popular Actor	Won	
2022	Weibo Night	Enterprising Actor of the Year	Won	
2023	8th China Quality Television Drama Awards	Quality New Rising Drama Star	Won	
2024	Weibo TV & internet Video Summit Awards	Shining Actor of the Year	Won	
2024	iQIYI Scream Night	Enterprising Actor of the Year	Won	
2024	Weibo Night	Most Promising Actor of the Year	Won	
2025	Weibo TV & İnternet Video Summit Awards	Annual Rising Star Actor	Won	
2025	iQIYI Scream Night	Most Anticipated Actor of the Year	Won	
