= Cheng Xiao =

Chinese singer and actress (born 1998)

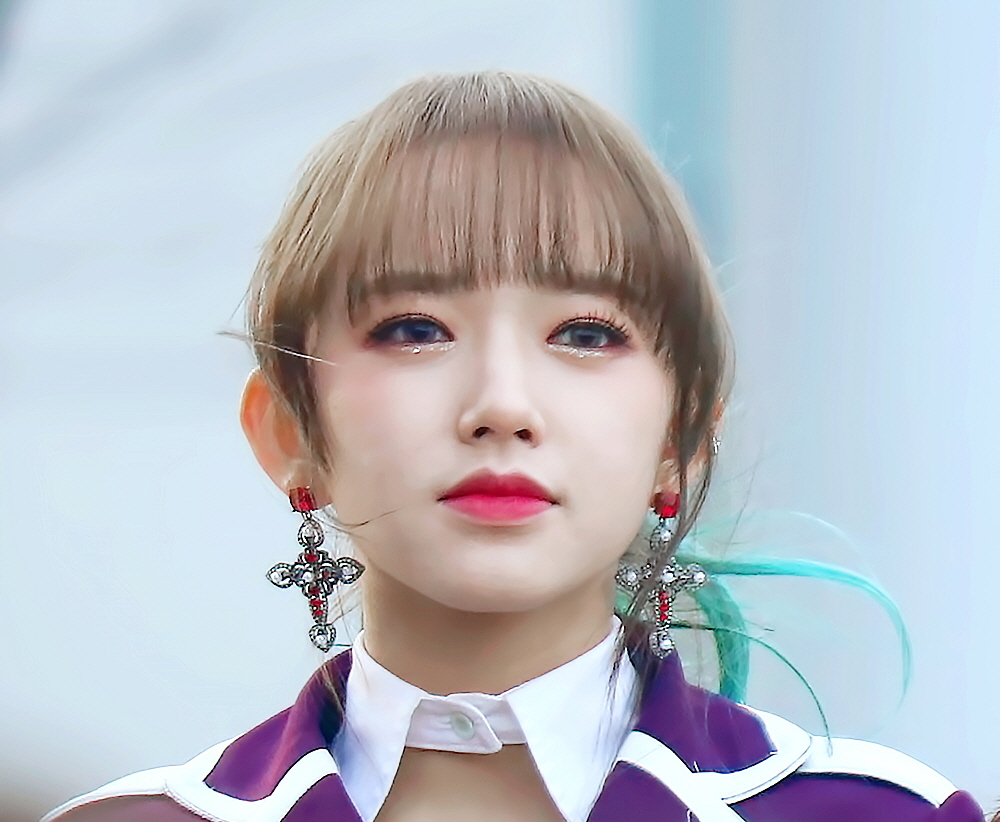
- Cheng in March 2018
- Born: July 15, 1998 (age 28); Shenzhen, Guangdong, China
- Education: School of Performing Arts Seoul – Department of Practical Dance
- Occupations: Singer; actress
- Years active: 2016–present
- Musical career
- Genres: K-pop; mandopop
- Instrument: Vocals
- Labels: Starship; Yuehua
- Formerly of: WJSN; Starship Planet

Chinese name
- Chinese: 程潇
- Hanyu Pinyin: Chéng Xiāo
- Jyutping: Cing4 Siu1

Korean name
- Hangul: 성소
- Revised Romanization: Seong So
- McCune–Reischauer: Sŏng So

Cheng Xiao (Chinese: 程潇; Korean: 성소, born July 15, 1998) is a Chinese singer, dancer, and actress. She made her debut as a member of the South Korean girl group WJSN in 2016. In early 2018, she began her solo activities in China and took a hiatus from the group since then. After a five-year hiatus from WJSN, she left the group in March 2023. As an actress, she is best known for her role as Tong Yao in Falling into Your Smile (2021).

== Early life ==
Cheng was born on July 15, 1998, in Nanshan District, Shenzhen, Guangdong. She has a younger sister, Cheng Chen (程晨). Cheng studied in Shenzhen Art School, and graduated from School of Performing Arts Seoul in 2016, where she studied under the Department of Practical Dance.

== Career ==
=== 2015–2016: Debut with WJSN ===
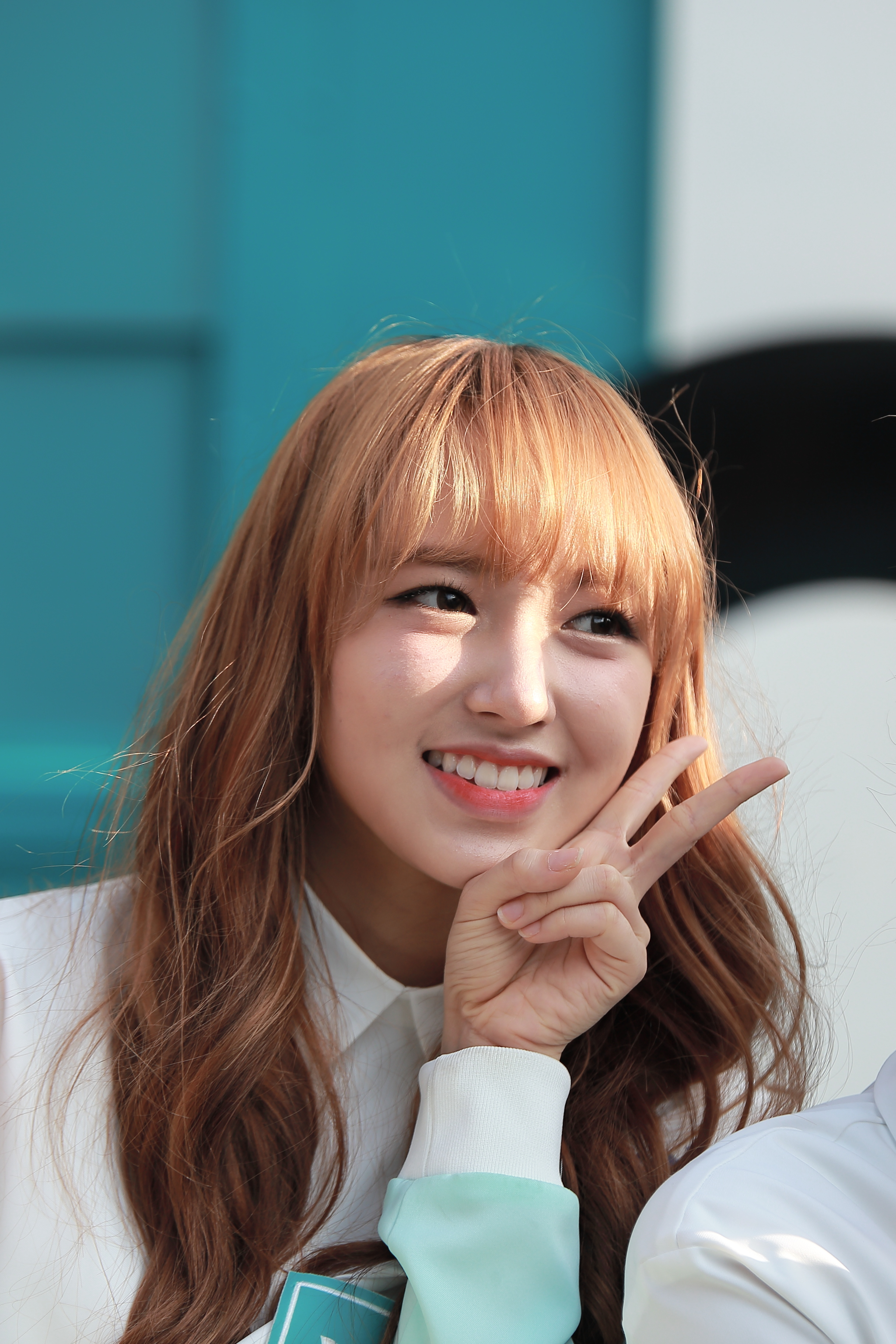
Cheng in June 2016

On December 10, 2015, Cheng was revealed as one of the members of WJSN's Wonder Unit. On December 21, she released a Christmas cover of "All I Want For Christmas Is You" by Mariah Carey with WJSN through JuseTV's YouTube Channel.

Cheng debuted with WJSN on February 25, 2016, with the release of their debut mini album Would You Like?, including the title tracks "Mo Mo Mo" and "Catch Me".

In August 2016, Cheng, together with fellow group mates Exy, Seola, Soobin, Eunseo, Yeoreum, and Dayoung, teamed up with label mate Monsta X to form the unit Y-Teen, a project unit group that promoted as CF models for KT's phone fare service.

On September 14, she was proclaimed winner of Pitch King, and on September 15, she won gold for the rhythmic gymnastics segment during the Idol Star Athletics Championships XII.

Cheng along with GFriend's Eunha, Oh My Girl's YooA, Gugudan's Nayoung, and Momoland's Nancy formed a special project group Sunny Girls for Inkigayo's Music Crush Project. They released their single "Taxi" on November 27, 2016.

=== 2017–present: Solo activities and departure from WJSN ===
On January 30, 2017, Cheng participated in the Idol Star Athletics Championships XIII, where she won a bronze medal during the rhythmic gymnastics segment. That same year, Cheng became a cast member of SBS' Law of the Jungle.

In 2018, Cheng was a cast member and dance mentor in the reality survival show Idol Producer. The same year, she was cast in her first costume drama, Legend of Awakening. In November 2018, Cheng released her first solo song "If Love", an OST for online game Xuanyuan Sword which debuted at No. 3 in QQ Music.

In 2020, Cheng acted in her first drama, Detective Chinatown.

In January 2021, Cheng debuted as a solo artist, with the single "Focus X". Throughout the year, she was also cast as the main role in various dramas such as the Chinese e-sport romance comedy television series Falling Into Your Smile.

On March 3, 2023, Starship Entertainment announced that Cheng had departed from WJSN after her contract expired.

== Discography ==
=== Extended plays ===
List of extended plays, showing selected details, and sales figures
Title	Details	Sales
1st Gold	Released: August 23, 2024; Label: Yuehua Entertainment; Formats: Digital download, streaming	CHN: 8,612

=== Single albums ===
List of single albums, showing selected details, and sales figures
Title	Details	Sales
Focus-X (聚焦-X)	Released: December 28, 2020; Label: Yuehua Entertainment; Formats: Digital download, streaming	CHN: 147,000+
Lonely Beauty	Released: February 25, 2022; Label: Yuehua Entertainment; Formats: Digital download, streaming	CHN: 23,000+
Imagine	Released: May 25, 2023; Label: Yuehua Entertainment; Formats: Digital download, streaming	CHN: 21,000+

=== Singles ===
List of singles, showing year released, selected chart positions, and name of the album
Title	Year	Peak chart positions	Album
Title	Year	CHN (Note: Billboard's China V Chart and China Top 100 have both been discontinued. The China TME UNI Chart was launched by Tencent Music in 2018 and first published by Billboard in November 2022.)	Album
As lead artist
"Focus-X" (聚焦-X)	2020	—	Focus-X
"Lonely Beauty"	2022	—	Lonely Beauty
"Imagine"	2023	—	Imagine
Collaborations
"Taxi" (with Eunha, YooA, Nayoung, and Nancy as Sunny Girls)	2016	—	Inkigayo Music Crush Part. 2
"Confession Song" (告白情歌) (with Meng Meiqi and Wu Xuanyi)	2017	—	Promotional song of Once Again
"The Shadow of the Shark" (with Wang Yibo)	2018	9	Promotional song of The Meg
Soundtrack appearances
"If Love" (若情)	2018	—	Xuanyuan Sword OST
"I Don't Believe You" (别轻易相信)	2020	—	Detective Chinatown OST
"Soulmate" (第一默契) (with Xu Kai)	2021	95	Falling Into Your Smile OST
"—" denotes releases that did not chart or were not released in that region.

== Filmography ==
=== Film ===
Year	English title	Chinese title	Role	Notes	Ref.
2021	Detective Chinatown 3	唐人街探案3	Lu Jingjing	Cameo	
2021	The Umbrella Man	撑伞人	Na Na		
2025	We Girls	向阳·花	Guo Aimei		

=== Television series ===
Year	English title	Chinese title	Role	Notes	Ref.
2020	Detective Chinatown	唐人街探案	Lu Jingjing		
2020	Legend of Awakening	天醒之路	Qin Sang		
2021	The World of Fantasy	灵域	Ling Yushi		
2021	Falling Into Your Smile	你微笑时很美	Tong Yao		
2021	My Heart	卿卿我心	Lu Qingqing		
2021	Lie to Love	良言写意	Su Xieyi		
2022	Vacation of Love 2	假日暖洋洋2	Cheng Miao		
2024	Follow Your Heart	颜心记	Qin Yanran / Yan Nanxing	Cameo (ep. 7)	
2024	Fangs of Fortune	大梦归离	Pei Sijing		
2025	Back For You	漫影寻踪	Chun Ying		
2025	Shadow Love	与晋长安	Ji Tianjiao	Cameo	
2025	Glory	玉茗茶骨	Rong Yunxi	Support role	
TBA	Light of Dawn	人之初	Long Yu		

=== Television shows ===
Year	English title	Original title	Role	Ref.
2017	Law of the Jungle in Kota Manado	정글의 법칙	Cast member	
2017	Swan Club	추석특집 발레교습소 백조클럽	Cast member	
2018	Idol Producer	偶像练习生	Dance mentor	
2018	Best Friends' Perfect Vacation	闺蜜的完美旅行	Cast member	
2018	Brave World	勇敢的世界	Cast member	
2018	Pajama Friends	파자마 프렌즈	Cast member	
2019	One More Try	极限青春	Cast member	
2019	We Are In Love	我们恋爱吧	Panelist	
2020	Final Expert	终极高手	Manager	
2020	We Are Young	少年之名	Mentor	
2022	Great Dance Crew	了不起舞社	Team leader	
2023	Great Dance Crew Season 2	了不起!舞社 第二季	Team leader	
2023	Chinese Restaurant Season 7	中餐厅7	Cast member	
2023	Asia Super Young	亚洲超星团	Dance mentor	

== Awards and nominations ==
Award	Year	Category	Nominated work	Results	Ref.
Cosmo Beauty Ceremony	2018	Annual Youthful Beautiful Idol	—N/a	Won	
Sina Fashion Awards	2019	Popular Idol of the Year	—N/a	Won	
Sohu Fashion Awards	2024	Annual Potential Actress 2024	Fangs of Fortune	Won	
Top Chinese Music Awards	2017	New Force Idol	—N/a	Won	
Wenrong Awards	2024	Top 10 Best Young Actor	Fangs of Fortune	Won	
