= Chen Duling =

Chinese actress (b. 1993)

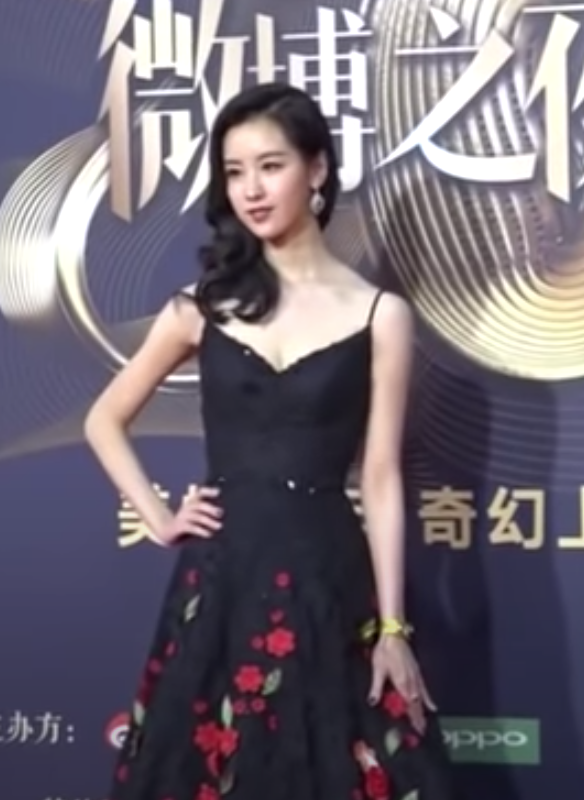
- Chen in 2018
- Born: October 18, 1993 (age 32); Xiamen, Fujian, China
- Education: Nanjing University of Aeronautics and Astronautics
- Occupation: Actress
- Years active: 2015–present

Chinese name
- Traditional Chinese: 陳都靈
- Simplified Chinese: 陈都灵
Transcriptions
Standard Mandarin
- Hanyu Pinyin: Chén Dūlíng

Chen Duling (Chinese: 陈都灵; born October 18, 1993) is a Chinese actress. She is best known for her role in the coming-of-age film The Left Ear (2015) directed by Alec Su, Love in Flames of War (2022), Till the End of the Moon (2023), Mysterious Lotus Casebook (2023), and The Glory (2025).

== Filmography ==
=== Film ===
| Year | English title | Original title | Role | Notes/Ref. |
|---|---|---|---|---|
| 2015 | The Left Ear | 左耳 | Li Er | |
| 2017 | Inference Notes | 推理笔记 | Xia Zao'an | |
| 2017 | Namiya | 解忧杂货店 | young Qianmei | |
| 2018 | Dream Breaker | 破梦游戏之不醒城 | Jiang Han | |
| 2019 | The Twins | 双生 | Tao | |
| 2021 | New Year Blues | 새해전야 | Yao Lin | |
| 2021 | Red Boat | 红船 | Yang Kaihui | |
| 2022 | Hot Soup | 热汤 | Xiao Huang | |
| 2023 | The Source of Power | 力量密码 | Xia Yilan | |
| 2024 | The Journey of Flower | 花千骨 | Hua Qian Gu | |
| 2024 | Special Party Branch | 堡垒 | Zheng Hong | |
| 2024 | Three Old Boys | 三叉戟 | Xiao Xue | |
| TBA | The Tunpu | 关索岭 | Jin'er | |
| TBA | No. 9 Uniform | 9号球衣 | Xiao Min | |

=== Television series ===
| Year | English title | Chinese title | Role | Network | Notes/Ref. |
|---|---|---|---|---|---|
| 2015 | Seventeen Blue | 会痛的17岁 | Li Wanying | Youku | |
| 2017 | Operation Love | 求婚大作战 | Ji Tiantian | Dragon TV | |
| 2018 | Myth of Sword | 鸣鸿传 | Wang Shishi | iQIYI | |
| 2019 | Another Me | 七月与安生 | Lin Qiyue | iQIYI | |
| 2020 | Winter Begonia | 鬓边不是海棠红 | Sheng Ziqing | iQIYI | Cameo |
| 2020 | Invisible Life | 这就是生活 | Ye Xiaobai | Hunan TV | |
| 2021 | Song of Youth | 玉楼春 | Sun Youde | Youku | |
| 2022 | Love in Flames of War | 良辰好景知几何 | Lin Hangjing | Zhejiang TV, Youku | |
| 2022 | Are You Safe? | 你安全吗？ | Si Ya | Tencent Video, iQIYI | Cameo |
| 2022 | Women Walk the Line | 我们的当打之年 | Yuan Ge | Tencent Video, iQIYI | |
| 2023 | Till the End of the Moon | 长月烬明 | Ye Bingchang / Mo Nü / Tian Huan | Youku | |
| 2023 | Mysterious Lotus Casebook | 莲花楼 | Qiao Wanmian | CCTV-8, CCTV-1, iQIYI | |
| 2023 | My Journey to You | 云之羽 | Madame Lan | iQIYI | Cameo |
| 2023 | Parallel World | 西出玉门 | He Xiaoyu | Tencent Video | Cameo |
| 2023 | A Journey To Love | 一念关山 | Xiao Yan | iQIYI | Cameo |
| 2024 | Judge Dee's Mystery | 大唐狄公案 | Qiu Yue | CCTV-8, Youku | Cameo |
| 2024 | Fox Spirit Matchmaker: Red-Moon Pact | 狐妖小红娘月红篇 | Yue Tixia | iQIYI | Cameo |
| 2024 | A Lonely Hero's Journey | 孤舟 | Zhang Haimo / Lin Shujuan | Jiangsu TV, Dragon TV, Beijing TV, iQIYI, Youku | |
| 2024 | Fangs of Fortune | 大梦归离 | Wen Xiao | iQIYI | |
| 2024 | Love Game in Eastern Fantasy | 永夜星河 | Mirror Demon | Tencent Video | Cameo |
| 2025 | The Glory | 贵女 | Zhuang Hanyan | Tencent Video | |
| 2026 | Veil of Shadows | 月鳞绮纪 | Wu Wangyan | Youku | |
| 2026 | Ashes to Crown | 翘楚 | Chu Zhao | Youku | |
| TBA | The Tale of Xishi: Kingdom Rebuilt | 浣溪沙 | Zheng Dan | Youku | |
| TBA | The Doll Game | 今天也没变成玩偶呢 | Bai Youwei | Youku | |
| TBA | Back to Life | 冬风吹又生 | Yu Jiuqi | Tencent Video | |

=== Documentary ===
| Year | English title | Chinese title | Notes/Ref. |
|---|---|---|---|
| 2017 | My Awesome Country | 厉害了我的国 | |

=== Variety show ===
| Year | English title | Chinese title | Role | Notes/Ref. |
|---|---|---|---|---|
| 2018 | Perhaps Love | 如果爱 | Cast member | |

== Discography ==
| Year | English title | Chinese title | Album | Notes/Ref. |
|---|---|---|---|---|
| 2019 | "Qiyue and Ansheng" | 七月与安生 | Another Me OST | with Shen Yue |
| 2019 | "My Motherland and I" | 我和我的祖国 | Qing Chun Wei Zu Guo Er Chang | |
| 2019 | "Starry Sea" | 星辰大海 | | For China Movie Channel Young Actors Project with 31 other actors |

== Awards and nominations ==
| Year | Award | Category | Nominated work | Results | Ref. |
|---|---|---|---|---|---|
| 2016 | 24th Shanghai Film Critics Awards | Best New Actress | The Left Ear | Nominated | |
| 2018 | iFeng Fashion Choice Awards | Most Popular Icon | —N/a | Won | |
