= List of iQIYI original programming =

iQIYI (pronounced in English as eye-CHEE-yee), formerly Qiyi, is a Chinese subscription video on-demand over-the-top streaming service owned by Baidu. Headquartered in Beijing, iQIYI primarily produces and distributes films and television series.

iQIYI is currently one of the largest online video sites in the world, with nearly 6 billion hours spent on its service each month and over 500 million monthly active users. On March 29, 2018, the company issued its initial public offering in the United States and raised $2.25 billion.

== Original dramas ==
The following is a list of iQIYI original drama series that premiered from two years (eg. 2018–2019). Only Chinese television series are included on this list:

Legend

Part of the iQIYI Original dramas (with/without VIP)
Part of the iQIYI VIP dramas
Part of the iQIYI dramas (but also selection of iQIYI VIP members only)
Part of the iQIYI dramas (but no longer exist on its main website due to the global restriction)

=== 2018–2019 ===
Title	Genre	Premiere date	Finale date	No. of episodes	Duration	Available?	Status

=== 2020–2021 ===
Title	Genre/s	Premiere date	Finale date	No. of episodes	Duration	Available?	Status

=== 2022–2023 ===
Title	Genre/s	Premiere date	Finale date	No. of episodes	Duration	Available?	Status
2022
Nothing but You	Comedy/romance	January 10, 2022		24	45 min.		
Sassy Beauty	Comedy/fantasy/historical/romance	January 14, 2022		24	45 min.		
Gold Panning	Adventure/mystery	January 18, 2022	January 27, 2022	12	45 min.		Ended
Shining for One Thing	Fantasy/romance/youth	January 26, 2022		24	40 min.		
The Theatre Stories	Comedy/drama/historical	February 3, 2022	March 3, 2022	35	35 min.		Ended
Oh My Lord	Comedy/historical/romance	February 14, 2022		15	30 min.		
Life Is a Long Quiet River	Drama/family	March 17, 2022	April 4, 2022	35	45 min.		Ended
Great Miss D	Business/drama/historical/thriller	March 18, 2022	March 27, 2022	12	45 min.		Ended
The Accidental Physicans	Comedy/historical	March 18, 2022	April 3, 2022	35	40 min.		Ended
Decreed by Fate	Comedy/historical/romance	March 31, 2022		16	35 min.		
Brilliant Class 8	Comedy/drama/romance/youth	April 1, 2022	April 7, 2022	40	45 min.		Ended
See You Tomorrow	Comedy/life/romance/youth	April 14, 2022	April 21, 2022	12	30 min.		Ended
My Sassy Princess	Comedy/historical/romance	April 16, 2022	April 23, 2022	22	45 min.		Ended
I Am a Superstar	Comedy/romance/sci-fi	April 30, 2022	May 11, 2022	24	45 min.		Ended
The Case Solver 2	Historical/mystery/thriller	May 2, 2022		24	34 min.		
Hello My Girl	Comedy/romance/youth	May 10, 2022		24	45 min.		
Rewriting Destiny	Comedy/fantasy/historical/romance	May 17, 2022		24	40 min.	No	
Day Breaker	Action/mystery/thriller	May 22, 2022	June 6, 2022	24	45 min.		Ended
Miss Buyer	Business/romance	June 2, 2022		24	45 min.		
Time to Fall in Love	Comedy/romance	June 10, 2022		24	35 min.		
Jiajia's Lovely Journey	Life/romance	June 15, 2022		16	34–38 min.		
Love the Way You Are	Romance	June 17, 2022	July 6, 2022	30	45 min.		Ended
Dr. Tang	Drama/medical/romance	June 25, 2022	July 10, 2022	36	45–46 min.		Ended
The Ugly Queen 2	Action/fantasy/romance	June 27, 2022		26	39–42 min.		
Hidden Edge	Action/mystery	July 11, 2022	July 20, 2022	24	45 min.		Ended
Out with a Bang	Romance/youth	July 21, 2022		24	42 min.		
My Way	Drama/romance/thriller	August 1, 2022	August 17, 2022	31	45 min.		Ended
Love Between Fairy and Devil	Comedy/fantasy/romance/wuxia	August 7, 2022	August 29, 2022	36	37–46 min.		Ended
Checkmate	Historical/mystery/thriller	August 10, 2022	August 24, 2022	24	45 min.		Ended
Chasing the Undercurrent	Action/adventure/mystery	August 25, 2022	September 20, 2022	40	45 min.		Ended
See You Again	Fantasy/historical/mystery/romance/youth	September 5, 2022	September 17, 2022	30	45 min.		Ended
Let's Meet Now	Comedy/romance/youth	September 9, 2022	September 17, 2022	20	35 min.		Ended
Start Up Together	Comedy/romance/youth	September 14, 2022	September 29, 2022	24	30 min.		Ended
Thousand Years for You	Adventure/fantasy/mystery/romance	September 15, 2022	October 6, 2022	36	37–40 min.		Ended
My Unimaginable 17	Mystery/romance/youth	September 20, 2022		16	35 min.		
Tiger Visit Macao	Romance/youth	September 21, 2022		24	28–30 min.		
Strange Tales of Tang Dynasty	Fantasy/mystery/thriller/wuxia	September 27, 2022	October 12, 2022	36	45 min.		Ended
Mr. Bad	Comedy/fantasy/romance	September 30, 2022	October 9, 2022	24	45 min.		Ended
Rock It, Mom	Family/music/romance/youth	October 12, 2022	October 15, 2022	12	45 min.		Ended
Hello My Noisy MP3	Comedy/romance/youth	October 12, 2022		25	35 min.		
Love in Time	Comedy/fantasy/romance/sci-fi	October 13, 2022	October 22, 2022	24	44–46 min.		Ended
Hello My Love	Comedy/life/romance	October 26, 2022	October 30, 2022	12	45 min.		Ended
Since I Met U	Drama/food/life/romance	October 28, 2022		16	30 min.		
Healing Food, Healing Love	Drama/food/life/romance	November 2, 2022		23	30 min.		
When We Meet	Comedy/romance/youth	November 7, 2022		24	35 min.		
New Life Begins	Comedy/historical/romance	November 10, 2022	December 9, 2022	40	45 min.		Ended
Fairy from the Painting	Fantasy/romance	November 17, 2022		24	39–40 min.		
Wild Bloom	Business/drama/romance	November 27, 2022	December 14, 2022	36	45 min.		Ended
Pretty Guardian of the City	Comedy/historical/romance	November 30, 2022		26	45 min.		
Eight Hours	Fantasy/romance/sci-fi	December 8, 2022	December 23, 2022	36	39–42 min.		Ended
First Love	Comedy/drama/romance/youth	December 12, 2022	December 21, 2022	24	45 min.		Ended
Song of the Moon	Fantasy/romance/wuxia	December 15, 2022	January 10, 2023	40	43–52 min.		Ended
Homesick	Mystery/thriller	December 21, 2022	December 30, 2022	12	50 min.		Ended
The Silence of the Monster	Adventure/mystery/romance/youth	December 23, 2022	January 1, 2023	36	45 min.		Ended
Unchained Love	Comedy/historical/romance	December 27, 2022	January 20, 2023	36	41–46 min.		Ended
Follow My Dear General	Comedy/historical/romance	December 29, 2022		31	9–14 min.		
2023
My Uncanny Destiny	Comedy/historical/romance	January 6, 2023		24	30 min.		
My Lethal Man	Romance/mystery	January 13, 2023		24	41–46 min.		
Along with Me	Romance/youth	January 16, 2023		18	30 min.		
When Try to Change Me Now	Mystery/thriller	January 16, 2023	January 19, 2023	6	1 hr. 15 min.		Ended
Viva Femina	Comedy/romance	January 25, 2023	February 13, 2023	35	40 min.		Ended
When I See Your Face	Romance/youth	January 29, 2023		15	28–30 min.		
Hello There	Comedy/historical/romance	January 31, 2023		20	29–35 min.		
Love Me Like I Do	Comedy/romance	February 3, 2023		18	28–30 min.		
Under the Microscope	Historical/mystery/thriller	February 9, 2023	February 19, 2023	14	36–37 min.		Ended
Perfect Mismatch	Romance	February 14, 2023		24	35 min.		
Never Give Up	Comedy/drama	February 21, 2023	March 10, 2023	40	23 min.		Ended
Warm on a Cold Night	Action/historical/romance	February 25, 2023	March 12, 2023	36	39–46 min.		Ended
Taste of Love	Comedy/romance	March 1, 2023	March 10, 2023	24	25 min.		Ended
Maybe This Is Love	Comedy/romance/youth	March 7, 2023		12	25 min.		
I Belonged to Your World	Drama/romance/sci-fi	March 10, 2023		20	35 min.		
Road Home	Romance	March 14, 2023	March 31, 2023	30	45 min.		Ended
The Science of Falling in Love	Comedy/romance/youth	March 15, 2023	April 3, 2023	24	38–42 min.		Ended
Echo	Mystery/romance/thriller	March 16, 2023	March 21, 2023	13	40 min.		Ended
Sticky Club	Comedy/fantasy	March 17, 2023	March 26, 2023	12	50 min.		Ended
The Girl Who Sees Smells	Comedy/romance/youth	March 20, 2023		20	30–40 min.		
Miss Chun Is a Litigator	Historical/mystery/romance	March 24, 2023		20	42–48 min.		
Pledge of Allegiance	Mystery/romance/adventure	March 28, 2023	April 8, 2023	24	43 min.		Ended
Falling before Fireworks	Drama/romance	March 31, 2023		23	35 min.		
The Magical Women	Drama/romance	April 1, 2023	April 11, 2023	20	41–45 min.		Ended
Thirteen Years of Dust	Drama/mystery/thriller	April 6, 2023	April 16, 2023	24	44–49 min.		Ended
Cute Bad Guy	Comedy/romance/sci-fi/youth	April 12, 2023		23	24–26 min.		
Wanru's Journey	Romance	May 26, 2023		24	32–37 min.		
Murder Notes	Mystery/thriller	May 30, 2023		12	45 min.		
To Ship Someone	Comedy/fantasy/romance/youth	May 31, 2023		24	30–45 min.		
Beauty of Resilience	Fantasy/romance	June 1, 2023	June 16, 2023	36	41–48 min.		Ended
Skip a Beat	Drama/romance	June 9, 2023	June 15, 2023	20	36–38 min.		Ended
Destined	Comedy/historical/romance	June 18, 2023	July 14, 2023	40	45 min.		Ended
Ten Years	Romance/youth	June 28, 2023		24	30 min.		
Divine Destiny	Adventure/fantasy/romance	July 2, 2023	July 26, 2023	36	45 min.		Ended
The Lost 11th Floor	Crime/mystery/thriller	July 9, 2023	July 18, 2023	24	TBA		Ended
Mysterious Lotus Casebook	Mystery	July 23, 2023	August 9, 2023	40	40–48 min.		Ended
Exclusive Fairytale	Romance/youth	July 27, 2023		24	30 min.		
You from the Future	Romance/sci-fi	August 4, 2023		24	30 min.		
Love You Seven Times	Adventure/fantasy/romance/wuxia	August 10, 2023	August 30, 2023	38	36–45 min.		Ended
Her World	Drama/romance	August 17, 2023	August 30, 2023	32	45 min.		Ended
The Evidence Tells	Mystery/thriller	August 18, 2023		32	21 min.		
A Different Mr. Xiao	Comedy/fantasy/romance/youth	August 22, 2023		24	35 min.		
Egg and Stone	Crime/mystery/romance	August 31, 2023	September 2, 2023	24	45 min.		Ended
My Journey to You	Adventure/mystery/romance	September 2, 2023	September 15, 2023	24	60 min.		Ended
My Annoying Roommate	Romance/youth	September 6, 2023		12	30 min.		
Hello, I'm at Your Service	Drama/romance/youth	September 15, 2023	October 2, 2023	24	45 min.		Ended
Best Enemy	Action/crime/historical	September 16, 2023	October 11, 2023	36	45–48 min.		Ended
Bright Eyes in the Dark	Action/drama/romance	September 19, 2023	October 6, 2023	40	45 min.		Ended
The Truth of Scent	Mystery/supernatural/thriller	September 28, 2023		24	35 min.		
Tiger and Crane	Fantasy/mystery/youth	October 2, 2023	October 16, 2023	36	45 min.		Ended
Romance on the Farm	Comedy/romance	October 14, 2023	October 25, 2023	26	45 min.		Ended
Never Too Late	Business	October 14, 2023	November 2, 2023	37	47 min.		Ended
The Bionic Life	Mystery/sci-fi/thriller	October 18, 2023	October 21, 2023	12	35 min.		Ended
The Case Solver 3	Historical/mystery/thriller	October 27, 2023	November 1, 2023	23	42 min.		Ended
Rising With the Wind	Business/romance	October 30, 2023	November 19, 2023	40	42–46 min.		Ended
The Fearless	Drama/family/mystery	November 3, 2023	November 20, 2023	40	44–48 min.		Ended
Story of Kunning Palace	Fantasy/historical/romance	November 7, 2023	November 25, 2023	38	39–46 min.		Ended
A Journey to Love	Action/historical/romance/wuxia	November 28, 2023	December 18, 2023	40	47–56 min.	No (Note: It was first classified as original drama that simultaneously aired worldwide. However, it is now restricted throughout the countries.)	Ended
The Baking Challenge	Comedy/food/romance	December 5, 2023		24	45 min.		
The Truth 2	Mystery/thriller	December 8, 2023		26	40 min.		
The Lonely Warrior	Action/crime/mystery	December 21, 2023	December 31, 2023	24	45 min.		Ended
Special Lady	Comedy/historical/romance/youth	December 29, 2023	January 13, 2024	36	45 min.		Ended
The Mutations	Action/historical/supernatural/thriller	December 30, 2023	January 7, 2024	12	45 min.		Ended

=== 2024–2025 ===
Title	Genre/s	Premiere date	Finale date	No. of episodes	Duration	Available?	Status
2024
Sword and Fairy 4	Fantasy/mystery/romance	January 17, 2024	February 1, 2024	36	45 min.		Ended
Golden House Hidden Love	Comedy/fantasy/romance/youth	January 19, 2024		24	45 min.		
Small Town Stories	Drama/friendship/romance	January 21, 2024	February 1, 2024	30	45 min.		Ended
Moments of Youth	Romance/comedy/youth	January 26, 2024		24	40 min.		
Fighting for Love	Action/historical/romance/war	January 31, 2024	February 21, 2024	36	45 min.		Ended
My Special Girl	Comedy/romance	February 1, 2024	February 11, 2024	24	45 min.		Ended
White Cat Legend	Adventure/fantasy/historical/mystery	February 20, 2024	March 8, 2024	36	42–46 min.		Ended
Detective Chinatown 2	Action/comedy/mystery/thriller	February 29, 2024	March 9, 2024	16	45 min.		Ended
Embracing the Stars Together	Romance/youth	March 1, 2024		24	35 min.		
Burning Flames	Fantasy/wuxia	March 13, 2024	April 3, 2024	40	44–46 min.		Ended
Fall in Love Again	Drama/romance	March 15, 2024	March 22, 2024	21	25 min.		Ended
Bazaar Beloved Birds	Comedy/historical/romance	March 28, 2024		24	28 min.		
The Farewell Song	Mystery/romance/thriller/youth	March 31, 2024	April 7, 2024	24	35 min.		Ended
Running Like a Shooting Star	Sports/youth	April 17, 2024		24	25 min.		
The Substitute Princess's Love	Historical/mystery/romance	April 26, 2024	May 2, 2024	24	30 min.		Ended
Our Memories	Romance/youth	April 30, 2024	May 3, 2024	21	34–36 min.		Ended
To the Wonder	Family/romance	May 7, 2024	May 10, 2024	8	43–46 min.		Ended
Tell No One	Crime/mystery/thriller	May 8, 2024	May 12, 2024	12	45 min.		Ended
Fox Spirit Matchmaker: Red-Moon Pact	Fantasy/romance/wuxia	May 23, 2024	June 11, 2024	36	39–46 min.		Ended
Liars in Love	Drama/romance	May 31, 2024		24	30 min.		
Lost in the Shadows	Crime/drama/mystery/adventure	June 6, 2024	June 13, 2024	16	45 min.		Ended
Follow Your Heart	Historical/mystery/romance/supernatural	June 21, 2024	July 6, 2024	40	38–46 min.		Ended
Moon Love	Fantasy/historical/romance	June 26, 2024		24	40 min.		
The Elephant Is Right Here	Comedy/thriller	July 4, 2024	July 10, 2024	12	45 min.		Ended
Her Fantastic Adventures	Comedy/historical/romance	July 6, 2024	July 21, 2024	36	39–43 min.		Ended
Interlaced Scenes	Family/mystery/thriller	July 11, 2024	July 17, 2024	15	42–45 min.		Ended
Strange Tales of Tang Dynasty II: To the West	Horror/mystery/thriller	July 18, 2024	August 2, 2024	40	48–54 min.		Ended
My Troublesome Honey	Comedy/romance	July 30, 2024	August 5, 2024	24	35 min.		Ended
The Fragments of Kylin	Fantasy/romance	July 31, 2024		24	30 min.		
The Neighbors	Crime/drama/mystery	August 8, 2024	August 15, 2024	20	35 min.		Ended
For the Young Ones	Crime/drama/family/thriller	August 14, 2024	August 22, 2024	18	45 min.		Ended
Go East	Comedy/historical/romance	August 23, 2024	September 7, 2024	37	45 min.		Ended
Debit Queen	Comedy/drama/historical/romance	August 29, 2024	September 4, 2024	24	30 min.		Ended
A Talented Girl Grows Up	Comedy/historical/romance	September 24, 2024	September 30, 2024	24	35 min.		Ended
The Limbo	Crime/mystery/thriller	September 26, 2024	September 30, 2024	12	40 min.		Ended
Snowy Night Timeless Love	Fantasy/romance	October 9, 2024	October 23, 2024	32	45 min.		Ended
Danger of Her 2	Crime/mystery/romance	October 11, 2024	October 14, 2024	16	35 min.		Ended
A Beautiful Lie	Drama/romance	October 19, 2024	November 3, 2024	36	45 min.		Ended
Fangs of Fortune	Adventure/fantasy/mystery/romance	October 26, 2024	November 16, 2024	34	45 min.		Ended
The Promise of Growing Up Together	Youth	November 22, 2024	November 28, 2024	24	43 min.		Ended
Pretty Boy	Comedy/historical/romance	November 28, 2024	December 4, 2024	24	45 min.		Ended
A Love Story of Oiled Paper Umbrella	Fantasy/historical/mystery/romance	December 18, 2024	December 24, 2024	24	35 min.		Ended
Love Song in Winter	Medical/mystery/romance/youth	December 20, 2024	January 1, 2025	36	45 min.		Ended
The Appearance of the Murderer	Crime/mystery/thriller	December 21, 2024		16	40 min.		
Let Wind Goes By	Drama/friendship/mystery	December 26, 2024	January 5, 2025	24	45 min.		Ended
2025
Life Is a Choice	Fantasy/romance	January 3, 2025	January 9, 2025	23	35 min.	Yes	Ended
Moonlight Mystique	Fantasy/melodrama/romance/wuxia	January 7, 2025	January 24, 2025	40	38–45 min.	Yes	Ended
Towards the Truth	Historical/mystery/supernatural/thriller	January 9, 2025	January 12, 2025	16	35 min.	Yes	Ended
Drifting Away	Crime/mystery/thriller	January 17, 2025	January 22, 2025	14	37–40 min.	Yes	Ended
Too Young to Grow Old	Friendship/youth	January 22, 2025	January 26, 2025	24	45 min.	Yes	Ended
The White Olive Tree	Drama/military/romance	February 1, 2025	February 15, 2025	38	40–45 min.	Yes	Ended
Back for You	Action/historical/mystery/romance	February 4, 2025	February 8, 2025	12	38 min.	Yes	Ended
Love of the Divine Tree	Fantasy/romance/wuxia	February 7, 2025	February 22, 2025	40	45 min.	Yes	Ended
City of Romance	Romance/youth	February 14, 2025		22	32 min.	Exclusively	
The Best Thing	Life/medical/romance	February 25, 2025	March 9, 2025	28	39–47 min.	Yes	Ended
Love of Petals	Fantasy/romance/supernatural/wuxia	February 27, 2025	March 1, 2025	24	35 min.	Exclusively	Ended
Cycle of Terror	Fantasy/mystery/thriller/youth	March 7, 2025		16	40 min.	Yes	
Unnatural Fire	Action/drama/mystery	March 13, 2025	March 27, 2025	38	38–47 min.	Yes	Ended
Watch Your Back	Crime/thriller	March 18, 2025	March 26, 2025	24	45 min.	Yes	Ended
Speak for the Dead	Crime/drama/mystery/thriller	April 11, 2025		24	35 min.	Yes	
The Demon Hunter's Romance	Adventure/fantasy/historical/romance	April 12, 2025	April 25, 2025	36	40–46 min.	Yes	Ended
A Life for a Life	Crime/mystery/thriller	April 17, 2025	April 19, 2025	13	45 min.	Yes	Ended
Love in Pavilion	Fantasy/romance/xianxia	April 28, 2025	May 11, 2025	36	38–46 min.	Yes	Ended
The Secret Path	Crime/mystery	April 28, 2025	May 16, 2025	28	45 min.	Yes	Ended
The Abyss	Crime/mystery/thriller	April 30, 2025		24	30 min.	Exclusively	
A Love Never Lost	Action/drama/historical/war	May 13, 2025	May 27, 2025	40	42–47 min.	Yes	Ended
The Comic Bang	Comedy/romance/youth	May 22, 2025	June 2, 2025	33	41–45 min.	Yes	Ended
A Prime Minister's Disguise	Comedy/historical/romance	May 27, 2025	May 30, 2025	24	35 min.	Yes	Ended
What a Wonderful World	Mystery/sci-fi	May 28, 2025	June 1, 2025	8	36–40 min.	Yes	Ended
Feud	Fantasy/romance/wuxia	June 6, 2025	June 21, 2025	32	39–46 min.	Yes	Ended
The Perfect Suspect	Crime/mystery	June 19, 2025	June 24, 2025	16	37–40 min.	Yes	Ended
A Dream Within a Dream	Comedy/fantasy/historical/romance	June 26, 2025	July 11, 2025	40	38–46 min.	Yes	Ended
Justifiable Defense	Crime/drama/mystery/thriller	July 9, 2025	July 15, 2025	15	45 min.	Yes	Ended
Coroner's Diary	Drama/historical/mystery/romance	July 13, 2025	July 27, 2025	38	37–42 min.	Yes	Ended
Better Halves	Comedy/historical/romance	July 24, 2025	August 2, 2025	24	45 min.	Yes	Ended
Beneath the Undertow	Mystery/thriller	July 31, 2025	August 6, 2025	19	40 min.	Yes	Ended
The Wanted Detective	Historical/mystery/thriller/war	August 1, 2025	August 14, 2025	36	39–45 min.	Yes	Ended
Fell Upon Me	Fantasy/romance/thriller/youth	August 8, 2025	August 11, 2025	22	35 min.	Exclusively	Ended
Fall in You	Romance	August 16, 2025		24	35 min.	Exclusively	
A Forbidden Marriage	Drama/fantasy/historical/romance	August 17, 2025	August 26, 2025	24	40–45 min.	Yes	Ended
Shadow Love	Fantasy/historical/romance/war	August 24, 2025	September 7, 2025	38	37–42 min.	Yes	Ended
Beloved	Drama/mystery/thriller	August 28, 2025	September 1, 2025	16	45 min.	Yes	Ended
Footprints of Change	Drama/life	September 4, 2025	September 14, 2025	30	38–45 min.	Yes	Ended
Return of the Queen	Crime/drama/family/romance	September 16, 2025		16	33 min.	Exclusively	
Mobius	Action/mystery/sci-fi/thriller	September 17, 2025	September 21, 2025	16	45 min.	Yes	Ended
Fated Hearts	Historical/mystery/romance	October 2, 2025	October 16, 2025	38	37–46 min.	Yes	Ended
The Hunt	Crime/mystery/thriller	October 11, 2025	October 17, 2025	16	45 min.	Yes	Ended
Sword and Beloved	Drama/fantasy/romance/xianxia	October 25, 2025	November 9, 2025	36	36–48 min.	Yes	Ended
Dead End	Crime/drama/mystery	November 1, 2025	November 7, 2025	18	45 min.	Yes	Ended
Speed and Love	Action/romance	December 12, 2025	December 22, 2025	29	39–45 min.	Yes	Ended
The Mirage	Fantasy/mystery/wuxia	December 19, 2025		24	50 min.	Yes	
The Punishment	Action/crime/mystery/thriller	December 25, 2025	January 9, 2026	40	45 min.	Yes	Ended

=== 2026–2027 ===
Title	Genre/s	Premiere date	Finale date	No. of episodes	Duration	Available?	Status
2026
How Dare You!?	Fantasy/historical/mystery/romance	February 6, 2026	February 18, 2026	32	38–45 min.	Yes	Ended
Dream of Golden Years	Business/romance/fantasy	March 17, 2026	April 2, 2026	36	40–48 min.	Yes	Ended
Sunsets Secrets Regrets	Mystery/romance/thriller	April 3, 2026	April 12, 2026	28	40–46 min.	Yes	Ended
Fate Chooses You	Fantasy/historical/romance/xianxia	April 25, 2026	May 19, 2026	40	45 min.	Yes	Ended
Spring of the Blade	Historical/mystery/romance	TBA		30	TBA	Not yet	Upcoming
When I Meet the Moon	Romance/youth	TBA		30	TBA	Not yet	Upcoming

== International co-productions & regional original dramas ==
The following original drama series were co-produced by iQIYI internationally or produced as regional programming.

=== Regional ===
Title	Genre/s	Collaboration with	Premiere date	Finale date	Selection territory	No. of episodes	Duration	Status
Left Right	Melodrama	CCTV-8	April 10, 2022	April 24, 2022	Worldwide	34	45 min.	Ended
The Heart of Genius	Life/mystery/sci-fi/youth	CCTV-8	July 22, 2022	August 5, 2022	Worldwide	34	42–45 min.	Ended
Lost in the Kunlun Mountains	Adventure/historical/mystery/youth	Tencent Video	July 27, 2022	August 20, 2022	Worldwide	36	42–51 min.	Ended
Beloved Life	Drama/medical/romance	CCTV-8, Tencent Video	September 7, 2022	September 22, 2022	Worldwide	36	43–46 min.	Ended
The Examination for Everyone	Drama/family/youth	CCTV-1, Mango TV, Tencent Video, Youku	September 21, 2022	October 8, 2022	Worldwide	22	43–46 min.	Ended
The Knockout	Romance/adventure/action	CCTV-8	January 14, 2023		Worldwide	39	44–47 min.	Ended
Miles to Go	Romance/drama	CCTV-1	March 20, 2023		Worldwide	37	45–52 min.	Ended
Take Us Home	Drama/romance	CCTV-8	April 15, 2023		Worldwide	36	45 min.	Ended
Grandma's New World	Adventure/family	JSTV	May 7, 2023		Worldwide	18	43–52 min.	Ended
Hi Producer	Business/drama	China Huanyu Entertainment Official	May 20, 2023		Worldwide	35	40 min.	Ended
In Later Years	Romance	CCTV-1	May 25, 2023		Worldwide	39	45 min.	Ended
Sisterhood	Historical/romance	CCTV-8	June 20, 2023		Worldwide	40	45 min.	Ended
Imperfect Victim	Romance/drama	BTV (Note: Later, it was also broadcast by Dragon TV.)	July 17, 2023		Selected iQIYI territory	29	45 min.	Ended
The Nest	Historical/mystery/thriller	CCTV	August 27, 2023		Worldwide	42	45 min.	Ended
Sunshine by My Side	Comedy/romance	CCTV-8, Tencent Video	September 1, 2023		Worldwide	36	43–48 min.	Ended
Spy Game	Crime/mystery	BRTV	September 20, 2023		Worldwide	38	40–45 min.	Ended
Like a Flowing River 3	Business/historical	CCTV-1	January 8, 2024	January 31, 2024	Worldwide	33	42–49 min.	Ended
Born to Run	Family/romance	CCTV-8	January 11, 2024	January 23, 2024	Selected iQIYI VIP members only	28	39–45 min.	Ended
A Soldier's Story	Comedy/historical	CCTV-8	January 25, 2024	February 4, 2024	Worldwide	24	45	Ended
Always on the Move	Drama/family/romance	CCTV-8	February 6, 2024	February 25, 2024	Worldwide	39	45 min.	Ended
War of Faith	Action/drama/espionage/historical	CCTV-8	March 21, 2024	April 7, 2024	Worldwide	38	45 min.	Ended
City of the City	Business/drama	CCTV-1	April 9, 2024	April 30, 2024	Selected iQIYI territory	40	45 min.	Ended
In the Name of the Brother	Espionage/historical/mystery/thriller	BTV, Dragon TV, JSTV	April 21, 2024	May 9, 2024	Worldwide	40	45 min.	Ended
Men in Love	Drama/romance	Tencent Video	May 3, 2024	May 20, 2024	Worldwide	40	41–47 min.	Ended
Golden Trio	Drama/family	BTV/JSTV	May 14, 2024	June 2, 2024	Worldwide	36	45 min.	Ended
My Wife's Double Life	Historical/mystery/romance	Tencent Video	May 31, 2024	June 10, 2024	Worldwide	24	45 min.	Ended
Family	Family	Tencent Video, Youku, ZJTV	June 26, 2024	July 21, 2024	Worldwide	40	47 min.	Ended
Lost Identity	Espionage/historical/mystery/war	Tencent Video	June 29, 2024	July 27, 2024	Worldwide	40	45 min.	Ended
Love's Rebellion	Fantasy/mystery/romance	Mango TV	July 31, 2024	August 18, 2024	Selected iQIYI territory	36	45 min.	Ended
As Husband as Wife	Drama/family/romance	CCTV-8	July 31, 2024	August 16, 2024	Worldwide	36	45 min.	Ended
A Lonely Heroes Journey	Historical/mystery/thriller/war	BTV, Dragon TV, JSTV, Youku	August 6, 2024	August 23, 2024	Selected iQIYI territory	36	45 min.	Ended
Wind Direction	Adventure/romance/youth	CCTV-8	September 9, 2024	September 20, 2024	Worldwide	30	45 min.	Ended
Dark Night and Dawn	Crime/historical/mystery/thriller	CCTV-8	September 18, 2024	October 4, 2024	Worldwide	38	45–52 min.	Ended
Echo of Her Voice	Comedy/historical/romance/supernatural	Youku	September 22, 2024	October 1, 2024	Worldwide	24	45 min.	Ended
Deep Lurk	Action/crime/espionage/historical	CCTV-8	November 13, 2024	November 30, 2024	Worldwide	38	45 min.	Ended
We Are Criminal Police	Action/crime	CCTV-8	November 27, 2024	December 13, 2024	Worldwide	38	45 min.	Ended
Trident 2	Crime/drama/mystery	BTV, Dragon TV	January 23, 2025	February 13, 2025	Worldwide	34	45 min.	Ended
Unbreakable 2	Drama/life/mystery	CCTV-8	January 26, 2025	February 12, 2025	Worldwide	38	45 min.	Ended
Northward	Drama/family/youth	CCTV-8	March 3, 2025	March 25, 2025	Worldwide	38	40–48 min.	Ended
A Moment but Forever	Fantasy/romance/wuxia	Youku	March 27, 2025	April 8, 2025	Worldwide	36	41–48 min.	Ended
The Lost National Treasure	Crime/mystery	CCTV-1, Tencent	May 20, 2025	June 13, 2025	Worldwide	36	43–46 min.	Ended
Eternal Brotherhood 2	Action/historical/sci-fi/wuxia	Tencent	May 30, 2025	June 7, 2025	Territories apply	24	45 min.	Ended
This Thriving Land	Drama/life	CCTV-8	August 13, 2025	August 23, 2025	Selected iQIYI VIP members only	36	40–46 min.	Ended
The Journey of Legend	Drama/historical/wuxia	Tencent	September 9, 2025	September 25, 2025	Worldwide	40	45 min.	Ended
Silent Honor	Drama/espionage/war	CCTV-8	September 30, 2025	October 16, 2025	Selected iQIYI VIP members only	39	45 min.	Ended
Strange Tales of Tang Dynasty III: To Changan	Historical/mystery/thriller	BTV	November 8, 2025	November 23, 2025	Worldwide	40	45 min.	Ended
Legend of the Magnate	Historical	CCTV-8	November 25, 2025	December 11, 2025	Worldwide	40	39–46 min.	Ended
Silent Tides	Historical/war	CCTV-1	December 9, 2025	December 24, 2025	Worldwide	31	37–46 min.	Ended
The Unclouded Soul	Fantasy/mystery/romance/xianxia	CCTV-8, Youku	December 26, 2025	January 12, 2026	Worldwide	40	40–48 min.	Ended
Love Between Lines	Drama/historical/romance/thriller	Dragon TV	January 9, 2026	January 20, 2026	Territories apply	28	40–46 min.	Ended
Born to Be Alive	Crime/drama/family/life	CCTV-8	January 30, 2026	February 15, 2026	Worldwide	40	40–45 min.	Ended
Our Dazzling Days	Drama/youth	CCTV-8	February 20, 2026	March 3, 2026	Worldwide	30	39–45 min.	Ended
Pursuit of Jade	Historical/mystery/romance	Tencent	March 6, 2026	March 27, 2026	Worldwide	40	40–47 min.	Ended
Live Up to Your Youth	Life/music/youth	CCTV-8	March 22, 2026	April 3, 2026	Worldwide	32	45 min.	Ended
Echoes of a Thousand Moons	Action/crime/historical/war	CCTV-8	April 7, 2026	April 24, 2026	Worldwide	40	~45 min.	Ended
The Epoch of Miyu	Business/drama/life/romance	Tencent (Note: Later, it was also broadcast by Beijing TV.)	April 13, 2026	April 30, 2026	Worldwide	38	~45 min.	Ended

=== International ===
Title	Genre/s	Co-production	Premiere date	Finale date	Selection territory	No. of episodes	Duration	Available?	Status
Two Worlds	Fantasy/drama/romance	Kongthup Production, True 5G	March 21, 2024	May 16, 2024	Southeast Asia	10	48 min.		Ended
KinnPorsche: The Series La Forte	Crime/LGBT/action	One 31 (Thailand)	April 2, 2022		14 episodes	60–75 min.		Ended	
Bad and Crazy	Mystery/crime/K-drama	tvN	December 17, 2021	Asian territories ex China	12 episodes	60–75 min.	Ended		
Hello Heart	Romantic comedy	ABS-CBN	December 15, 2021	Southeast Asia	8 episodes	36–43 min.	Ended		
Saying Goodbye	Romantic drama	ABS-CBN	December 4, 2021	Southeast Asia	8 episodes	40–43 min.	Ended		
Idol: The Coup	Teen K-drama	JTBC	November 8, 2021	Asian territories ex China	12 episodes		Ended		
Jirisan	Mystery/fantasy/thriller/K-drama	tvN	October 23, 2021	Asian territories ex China	16 episodes		Ended		
My Roommate is a Gumiho	Romance/Fantasy/K-drama	tvN	May 26, 2021	Asian territories ex China	16 episodes		Ended		
The Spies Who Loved Me	Romance/K-drama	MBC TV	October 21, 2020	Asian territories ex China	16 episodes		Ended		
Legal Mavericks	Legal drama	TVB	June 20, 2016	Mainland China	2 seasons, 28 episodes	42–43 min.	Ended		
Mysterious Summer (Japanese:不思議な夏)	Fantasy	Fuji TV	August 8, 2014	Worldwide	15 episodes	17–32 min.	Ended		

== Short-length (mini) dramas ==
Title	Genre/s	Premiere & finale date	No. of episodes	Duration
2022
Way Back into Love	Adventure/romance/sci-fi	December 20, 2022	20	10 min.
2023
Romance with Blind Master	Romance	January 9, 2023	15	12 min.
Mommy's Counterattack	Romance/drama	February 24, 2023	16	13 min.
The Best Friend	Romance/drama	April 6, 2023	20	12 min.
An Actor's Rhapsody	Romance/drama	April 28, 2023	24	12 min.
Yes, I Am a Spy	Comeedy/historical/mystery/romance	May 5, 2023	15	10 min.
Love You Self-evident	Romance	June 6, 2023	20	10 min.
Just Spoil You	Family/romance	July 28, 2023	20	10 min.
Cordial Companions	Historical/mystery/romance	October 24, 2023	20	10 min.
Wife Above All	Comedy/historical	November 30, 2023	30	12 min.
His and Her Secrets	Romance	December 14, 2023	24	10 min.
2024
The Ghost Town	Romance/thriller	January 3, 2024	23	15 min.
Have a Crush on You	Drama/romance	January 11, 2024	24	10 min.
My Piggy Boss	Comedy/fantasy/romance	February 2, 2024	12	14 min.
Marry Me, My Evil Lord	Historical/mystery/romance	February 28, 2024	20	15 min.
Miss You Forever	Historical/mystery/romance	March 6, 2024	22	10 min.
No One Survival	Mystery/thriller	March 8, 2024	20	10 min.
My Piggy Lover	Drama/romance	March 14, 2024	24	11 min.
Love Beyond the Gaming World	Fantasy/romance	March 25, 2024	13	10 min.
The Expect Love	Fantasy/historical/mystery/romance	April 2, 2024	36	18 min.
Princess Deformation Meter	Historical/romance	April 9, 2024	18	10 min.
Her Lovers	Romance	April 18, 2024	16	12 min.
Peacock in Wonderland	Fantasy/historical/romance	April 19, 2024	42	19 min.
Flower in the Mirror	Historical/mystery/romance	April 24, 2024	27	10 min.
Lovesickness	Historical/romance	May 8, 2024	24	10 min.
Dear Miss Ostrich	Comedy/drama/romance	May 14, 2024	24	13 min.
The Strange Princess	Fantasy/historical/romance	May 16, 2024	24	12 min.
Love in the Hotel	Comedy/romance	May 28, 2024	20	13 min.
Food Knocks at the Door	Food/romance	June 11, 2024	24	10 min.
Nanfan Family	Comedy/fantasy	July 10, 2024	20	15 min.
First Marriage	Historical/mystery/romance	July 25–31, 2024	24	15 min.
Unrivaled Countenance	Fantasy/romance	August 6–11, 2024	24	12 min.
Miss Bai	Romance	August 7, 2024	24	11 min.
Hard Noble Lady	Fantasy/historical/romance	August 15–21, 2024	30	12 min.
Romantic Boyfriend	Drama/romance	August 22, 2024	24	10 min.
Original Sin	Crime/mystery/thriller	August 30–September 5, 2024	25	18 min.
Please Remember Me	Fantasy/historical/romance/thriller	September 19–26, 2024	30	15 min.
Dual Love	Drama/romance/wuxia	September 27–30, 2024	23	11 min.
Substitute	Historical/romance	October 9–11, 2024	24	12 min.
The Killer Bride	Historical/romance	October 15–21, 2024	28	8 min.
The Scent of Lime	Friendship/youth	October 23, 2024	12	11 min.
Mistaken Love	Drama/historical/romance	October 24–30, 2024	24	13 min.
Love You 3000 Times	Romance	October 30–November 1, 2024	24	10 min.
Like Dust with Light	Drama/fantasy/historical/romance	November 6–12, 2024	20	10 min.
Punch Out Life	Comedy	November 8–11, 2024	23	10 min.
No More Silence	Drama/family/romance	November 13–16, 2024	21	11 min.
Ancient Forensic Expert	Historical/mystery/romance	November 14–20, 2024	16	10 min.
Don't Forget Me	Fantasy/historical/romance	November 20–23, 2024	24	12 min.
Back to 1995	Comedy/drama	November 21–27, 2024	35	15 min.
Peace & Love	Drama/fantasy/historical/romance	November 26–28, 2024	20	11 min.
Never Apart from You	Crime/mystery/historical/romance	November 29–December 2, 2024	22	12 min.
Popeyete and Cute Master	Comedy/historical/romance/supernatural	December 3–5, 2024	20	10 min.
The Night Is Still Young	Fantasy/historical/romance	December 6–10, 2024	30	20 min.
Ruyi	Fantasy/historical/romance	December 11–15, 2024	20	12 min.
Two Foxes	Drama/romance	December 17–19, 2024	24	15 min.
Love Trap	Historical/romance	December 19–22, 2024	24	15 min.
Soul Sisters	Comedy/drama/wuxia	December 27–29, 2024	24	13 min.
True Love Moon	Historical/romance/supernatural	December 30, 2024–January 5, 2025	24	12 min.
2025
Bright Moon	Comedy/history/supernatural	January 2–4, 2025	20	12 min.
Reunion as First Sight	Historical/romance	January 8–11, 2025	24	12 min.
Blind Woman	Crime/historical/romance	January 10–16, 2025	24	15 min.
Always My General	Historical/romance	January 15–18, 2025	24	20 min.
May Your Heart Be Like Mine	Fantasy/romance/wuxia	January 16–22, 2025	24	14 min.
The Resurrection of Justice	Comedy/fantasy/romance	January 17–24, 2025	24	10 min.
Millenium Heart	Fantasy/romance/wuxia	January 19–25, 2025	34	19 min.
Princess's Venture	Comedy/historical/romance	February 7–9, 2025	20	10 min.
Heal the Moon	Historical/romance	February 11–14, 2025	21	15 min.
She May Not Be Cute	Romance	February 13–15, 2025	23	17 min.
Buzz Marketing	Business/comedy	February 17, 2025	24	12 min.
Love's Dilemma	Melodrama/romance	February 26, 2025	20	10 min.
Love and Strife	Historical/romance	March 3–6, 2025	24	14 min.
The Awakening of Housewives	Romance	March 6–8, 2025	20	15 min.
Revenge Waits in the Shadows	Historical	March 11–13, 2025	24	17 min.
Eyes for Truth	Crime/drama/mystery	March 18, 2025	24	15 min.
Blazing Elegance	Historical/romance	March 27–30, 2025	24	15 min.
Maoshan Watchmen	Historical/horror/thriller	March 31–April 3, 2025	24	10 min.
Touch of the Frozen Heart	Historical/romance	April 3–5, 2025	24	10 min.
Exorcist Chef	Fantasy/food/romance	April 8, 2025	24	10 min.
Atonement	Horror/mystery/thriller	April 10, 2025	18	10 min.
Phoenix's Gambit: Love or Crown	Fantasy/historical/romance	April 15–18, 2025	24	18 min.
His Secret	Romance	April 17–19, 2025	23	12 min.
Too Late to Love	Historical/romance	April 18–20, 2025	22	12 min.
The Secret of Booth No. 9	Fantasy/mystery/romance/youth	April 22–24, 2025	21	10 min.
Destiny	Music/romance	April 29–May 2, 2025	24	12 min.
May All Your Wishes Come True	Historical/romance	April 30, 2025	22	13 min.
Close to You	Comedy/youth	May 20–24, 2025	31	18 min.
Who Take My Heart Away	Historical/romance	May 22–25, 2025	24	17 min.
Love Through Time	Fantasy/youth	May 27–29, 2025	23	10 min.
Adventure for Love	Fantasy/historical/romance	May 30–June 1, 2025	24	15 min.
Detective Concerto	Historical/mystery/thriller	June 5–7, 2025	22	10 min.
Lost in the Time	Business/historical/mystery/romance	June 10–12, 2025	24	14 min.
Where Love Dares	Drama/historical/romance	June 17–19, 2025	20	15 min.
Falling for Divinity	Adventure/fantasy/romance/xianxia	June 20–22, 2025	24	15 min.
Muyilin's Pearl	Romance	July 9, 2025	24	12 min.
Spring's Gentle Return	Historical/romance	July 13–17, 2025	24	10 min.
Your Sunshine	Historical/mystery/romance	July 15–18, 2025	27	20 min.
The Blade of Romance	Historical/romance	July 22–24, 2025	24	11 min.
Mirrored Souls: A Ming Dynasty Adventure	Historical/mystery/thriller	July 25–27, 2025	27	19 min.
Dangerous Relationship	Sci-fi/thriller	July 29–31, 2025	24	10 min.
Blend Feelings	Fantasy/romance	August 5–8, 2025	24	15 min.
Everbloom Dynasty	Historical/romance	August 19, 2025	24	10 min.
A Lifetime of Happiness	Romance	August 26, 2025	18	15 min.
Be Her Resilience	Business/family/historical	September 10, 2025	24	15 min.
The Tower of Whispers	Drama/fantasy/historical/romance	September 27–October 6, 2025	24	15 min.

== Anime/children ==
Title	Genre	Premiere	Seasons	Partnered with	Length	Status
Deer Squad	Animation	July 15, 2020	120 episodes	Nickelodeon	12 min.	Ongoing
The Tales of Wonder Keepers	Animation	June 15, 2021	26 episodes	Wizart Animation	12 min.	Ongoing
The Legend of Sky Lord	Chinese fantasy/shounen	December 18, 2020	Updated to episode 89	10 min.	Ongoing	
The Love Story of My Immortal Dad	Shoujo/romance	June 25, 2020	88 episodes	10 min.	Ongoing	
The Fabulous Sword God	Chinese fantasy/shounen	2020	78 episodes	12 min.	Ongoing	

== Variety/reality ==
Title	Genre	Premiere	Seasons	Length	Status
Wander Together	Reality show	December 27, 2025	14 episodes		Ongoing
Action!	Acting competition	December 10, 2021	Updating		Ongoing
Stage Boom	Music competition	August 5, 2021	12 episodes		Ended
New Generation Hip-hop Project	Music competition	July 31, 2021	12 episodes		Ended
The Detectives' Adventures	Reality show	May 28, 2021	13 episodes		Ended
HAHAHAHAHA (Note: Co-produced with Tencent Video, and later broadcast on Dragon TV)	Reality show	November 6, 2020	6 seasons		Ongoing
Idol Producer	Music competition	April 6, 2018	12 episodes		Ended

== Exclusive distribution ==
Title	Genre	Premiere	Co-distribution	Territory availability	Seasons	Length	Status
Our Times	Romance/fantasy	October 10, 2022	Dragon TV, JSTV, Mango TV		44	45–47 min.	Ended
My Calorie Boy	Comedy/romance/youth	September 26, 2022	Tencent Video	All iQIYI territory	30		Ended
Ordinary Greatness	Action/mystery/youth	May 28, 2022	CCTV-8	All iQIYI territory	38 episodes		Ended
Binary Love	Romance/comedy/youth	May 27, 2022	Tencent Video	All iQIYI territory	24 episodes		Ended
The Romance of Hua Rong 2	Romance/comedy/historical	May 20, 2022	Mango TV	All iQIYI territory	24 episodes		Ended
The Fight	Action/thriller/drama	May 10, 2022	Tencent Video	All iQIYI territory	24 episodes		Ended
The Scale of Desire	Mystery	May 2, 2022	JSTV, Tencent Video	All iQIYI territory	40 episodes		Ended
Love in a Loop	Romance/comedy/fantasy	May 1, 2022	Tencent Video	All iQIYI territory	24 episodes		Ended
The Wind Blows from Longxi	Historical/mystery	April 27, 2022	CCTV-8	All iQIYI territory	24 episodes		Ended
Be My Princess	Romance/fantasy	March 16, 2022	Mango TV	All iQIYI territory	30 episodes		Ended
Under the Skin	Thriller/mystery	March 6, 2022	Tencent Video	All iQIYI territory	20 episodes		Ended
Love Unexpected	Romance/fantasy/thriller/mystery	February 28, 2022	Tencent Video	All iQIYI territory	24 episodes		Ended
The Old Dreams	Romance/youth	February 20, 2022	CCTV-8	All iQIYI territory	36 episodes		Ended
The Flowers Are Blooming	Romance	December 19, 2021	Tencent Video	All iQIYI territory	24 episodes		Ended
The Sweetest Secret	Romance	December 15, 2021	-		24 episodes		Ended
Who is Princess	Talent show	October 5, 2021	Hulu Japan, GyaO!, Weverse, SoftBank VR Square	Only iQiyi international market	10 episodes		Ended
Plot Love	Romance	Apr 27, 2021	Original exclusive premiered on Youku in mainland China	Only iQiyi International market	24 episodes		Ended
Ten Years Late	Romance	September 19, 2019	Tencent video, later broadcast on SZTV		39 episodes		Ended

== Movie ==
=== Original iQIYI web films ===
Title	Genre	Premiere	Runtime
Fall in Love With My King	Romance/comedy	December 20, 2020	1 hour 34 min.

=== Exclusive web film distribution (from independent studio) ===
Title	Genre	Premiere	Runtime
King Serpent Island	Action/thriller/adventure	July 21, 2021	1 hour 31 min.
Mermaid in the fog	Romance/fantasy/drama	December 8, 2021	1 hour 23 min.
