= Lu Yuxiao =

Chinese actress (born 1999)

- 卢昱晓
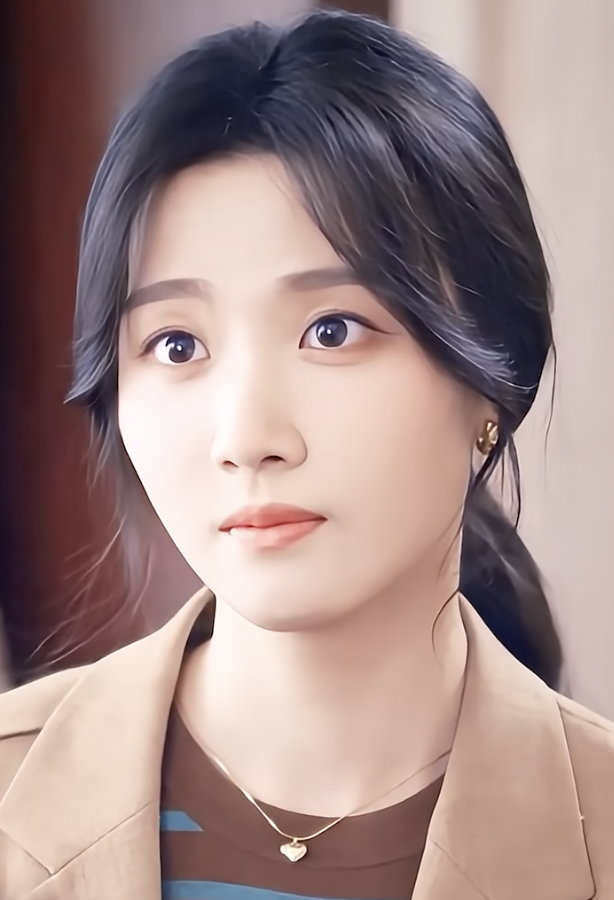
- Lu in Love Between Lines, 2026
- Born: September 27, 1999 (age 27); Shanghai, China
- Other name: Irene Lu
- Occupation: Actress
- Years active: 2019–present
- Agent: Star Times
- Height: 165 cm (5 ft 5 in)

Chinese name
- Simplified Chinese: 卢昱晓
Transcriptions
Standard Mandarin
- Hanyu Pinyin: Lú Yùxiǎo

Lu Yuxiao (Chinese: 卢昱晓; pinyin: Lú Yùxiǎo, born September 27, 1999), or Irene Lu, is a Chinese actress. She gained popularity for playing the role of Shangguan Qian in My Journey to You (2023), after which she was awarded Expected Actor of the Year at the Weibo Awards 2023. She received further recognition for playing the roles of Ming Yi in Love in the Clouds (2025) and Hu Xiu in Love Between Lines (2026).

== Early life and education ==
Lu Yuxiao, or Irene Lu, was born on September 27, 1999, in Shanghai, China. Her mother is a dentist, whilst her father is a doctor, and the Vice President of Shanghai Bo'ai Hospital. An only child, Lu was raised in Shanghai. Growing up, she initially wanted to become a forensic pathologist. She began learning dance at the Little Star Dance School, where she would attend weekly classes. At the age of 14, Lu moved to the United Kingdom, to study at Bootham School, where she completed her secondary education, taking A-levels in Economics, Maths, Art, and Chinese. She later, enrolled at the University of Leeds, for a degree related to fashion design.

== Career ==
=== 2019–2023: Debut and career beginnings ===
Interested in performing, Lu would post videos of herself on social media enacting short scenes, alongside photos. In 2019, these caught the attention of an agent, leading Lu to sign with Star Times Agency. Whilst her family initially worried about her choice to pursue acting, fearing she lacked connections in the industry, they supported her. In November 2019, Lu made her first onscreen appearance, as a contestant on the survival variety show Real Actor, which aired on Youku. The program focused on participants' performance skills, and development as actors, marking her official entry into the entertainment industry. Lu later secured her first television drama role as Qimu Yiluo in seasons 1 and 2 of the iQIYI series No Boundary, which premiered in March 2021. The same year, she had a guest role as Kui Er in the series Good and Evil.

In April 2022, Lu portrayed Lian Ge Yao, a tv anchor, in the romance series See You Tomorrow, which aired on iQIYI. In October of that year, she played the ill-fated Wu Miao, in Tencent Video's contemporary urban drama My Deepest Dream. In November 2022, upon the nomination of cinematographer Yang Zhenyu, Lu was selected for the Starry Oceans Young Actor Programme, a CCTV6 initiative to promote emerging talent. She next starred as Lin Xi, opposite Wu Junting, in the youth campus drama Time and Him Are Just Right, an adaptation of the novel of the same name by Jiang Mutong, which premiered on December 25, 2022. Her portrayal of the "fox-like" girl garnered attention for her natural and lively performance, with media outlets praising her beauty.

In May 2023, Lu co-starred with Zhu Zhengting in the urban romance drama To Ship Someone, in which she played the optimistic Song Yangqi, a film and television producer. She then played Bai Xueying, the eldest daughter of the Bai Clan, in the xianxia series The Longest Promise, which aired in July 2023. That same month, Lu took part in the acting-focused variety show Hit It Off, which later aired on Youku. In August 2023, she played Jin Luo in iQIYI's fantasy drama Love You Seven Times.

=== 2023–present: Breakthrough and rising popularity ===
In September 2023, the wuxia drama My Journey to You began airing on iQIYI, in which Lu played the scheming assassin Shangguan Qian, regarded her breakout role, for which she gained greater recognition. During this period, Lu's Weibo followers increased tenfold from 300,000 to 3 million. She had been selected for the role following her audition, in which she stood out from over two hundred competitors. The director, Guo Jingming, praised Lu for her "extremely strong sense of conviction". Later that same year, the dramas Parallel World and Battle Through the Heaven aired, in which she played supporting roles. On December 31, 2023, Lu participated in Hunan TV and Mango TV's New Year's Eve Gala. She was awarded Expected Actor of the Year at the 2023 Weibo Awards, which took place in 2024.

On January 19, 2024, Lu began filming the historical costume drama Perfect Match, directed by Yu Zheng, in which she starred as Kangning, the witty third daughter of the Li family. Filming concluded on April 18 that year. On March 15, 2024, she was announced as the female lead in the xianxia drama Love in the Clouds, starring opposite Hou Minghao. Filming commenced on August 31, 2024, and was completed on January 10, 2025. She additionally played Shao Yao in the costume drama Blossoms in Adversity, and Li Jia in the drama Romance in the Alley, which aired in 2024 on Youku and Hunan TV respectively. For her work, she won Promising Actor of the Year at the 2024 Weibo Awards, which took place on January 11, 2025.

On January 25, 2025, Perfect Match premiered globally on Netflix. Lu also appeared in its accompanying variety show, Perfect Match: Friendship Sharing. She was next confirmed to star alongside Chen Xingxu in the urban romance drama Love Between Lines, which began filming on February 24. On April 25, 2025, the historical drama Serendipity premiered on WeTV, in which Lu portrayed Mingshu, a wealthy heiress, and sole survivor of a family massacre. On May 4, 2025, she participated in the 2025 May Fourth Youth Day New Media Special Program - Ode to Youth, in which she sang "Landscape Painting Scroll". In August 2025, Lu was announced to star opposite Lin Yi in the modern romance drama When I Meet the Moon, based on the novel of the same name by Zhu Yi.

On October 8, 2025, Love in the Clouds premiered on Youku, where it had gained 2 million pre-registrations before release. This led to wider recognition for Lu, who played the role of Ming Yi, a cold-blooded female warrior who disguises herself as a dancer, and engages in a battle of wits with her rival. Within two weeks, the show achieved over 400 million effective views on Maoyan, a 15.5% market share on Yunhe Data, and 6.14 billion views on Douyin's main hashtag. It surpassed a heat index of 10,000 on Youku, and topped 21 third-party charts across the internet, including the overall effective viewership chart for historical series on Maoyan that month. As of November 28, the show had accumulated 1.332 billion views. On December 31, 2025, Lu participated in both Dream Comes True in the East: 2026 Dragon TV New Year's Eve Gala and Sailing 2026 - CCTV New Year's Eve Gala, performing the song "Peach Blossom Smile" in the latter, alongside Zhang Hanyun.

On January 9, 2026, Love Between Lines premiered on iQIYI and DragonTV. The show ranked 1st on iQIYI's weekly chart for average effective views per episode, and reached a market share of 12.8% on Yunhe Data during its run. Lu played the role of Hu Xiu, a hardworking, aspiring architect whose life becomes intertwined with the male protagonist after meeting in a virtual reality murder mystery game. She received praise and gained further recognition for her portrayal of the self-reliant, and courageous female lead, who achieved a character popularity exceeding 100 million on iQIYI.

On January 25, 2026, it was announced that Lu had been cast as Nanyi in the historical spy drama Dancing with the Tide, based on the novel of the same name by Xianyu Ke. Filming for the drama began that day. On February 5, 2026, Lu was awarded the Notable Actor of the Year Award at the 2025 Weibo Awards. On March 9, 2026, Lu was awarded Annual Quality and Influential Drama Star at the Dragon TV Drama Quality Ceremony, for her "delicate, restrained, and highly empathetic" portrayal of Hu Xiu. Filming for Dancing with the Tide concluded on 16 June 2026. On July 16th that year, Lu began filming her first movie role, as Lin Yu'an in The Last Confession, starring opposite Li Xiaoqian. Filming was completed on August 30. On September 12, 2026, she was announced as the female lead, Su Luowei, in historical drama Revenge, which commenced filming that day. Between 05 and 15 November that year, When I Meet the Moon aired on iQIYI, topping the platform's popularity charts in 15 overseas territories.

== Other activities ==
=== Endorsements ===
On November 15, 2025, Lu was announced as a brand ambassador for French luxury fashion house Louis Vuitton. The same year, she became a spokesperson for several domestic Chinese brands: the fashion brands TATA, Guvet, and MSLAN, the travel lifestyle brand ITO, the cosmetics brand Passional Lover, and skincare brand Freeplus. She also became a photography ambassador for Oppo's Reno14 phone series in 2025. Between January to May 2026, Lu was also named a New Year's photo ambassador for Haima Photo Studio; a beauty ambassador for Nice Princess; a body care vitality ambassador for Olay; an ambassador for Chips Ahoy!; a brand ambassador for Just Chill; and the ambassador for Game for Peace, serving as the face for the Shahua Annie. In September 2026, Lu became an ambassador for apparel brand Broadcast, and was upgraded to ITO's Asia-Pacific ambassador.

=== Philanthropy ===
In 2023, Lu participated in the "Half a Smile" campaign, to support children with autism. In January 2025, she donated funds to the Beijing Han Hong Charity Foundation, to support Shigatse, Tibet, which was struck by an earthquake. In November 2025, she donated again via the Han Hong Charity Foundation to those affected by the Wang Fuk Court fires in Hong Kong. In July 2026, she donated supplies to the Huang Xiaoming Charity Foundation to aid flood relief efforts in the region of Guangxi.

== Reception ==
=== Public image ===
In 2024, Lu participated in the variety show My Little One, in which she shared insights into her personal and family life. This received positive attention from viewers, who praised her seemingly loving upbringing, and Lu's cheerful and optimistic nature. That same year, onlookers on set revealed that, whilst filming the drama Serendipity, Lu performed CPR on a crew member who suffered a cardiac arrest. The member reportedly regained consciousness and was rushed to hospital afterwards. For this, she was praised by netizens for her bravery and kindness. Off-screen, Lu has been described as gentle, relatable, "consistently approachable, and down-to-earth". She has received praise for appearing authentic, with communication researchers noting that she displays "her real daily life without the filter of a script". She has also drawn attention for appearing unpretentious, especially during fan interactions. Her emotional intelligence has also been noted by media outlets. In February 2026, Lu was praised by media outlets and netizens for her empathy and sincerity when consoling a fan who had lost their grandmother, with her response described as "combining rational depth with emotional warmth". In April 2026, she was named by Tatler as one of the leading figures in the "authentic idol" movement, and of the best rising Chinese drama actors set to dominate the year.

=== Artistry and audience appeal ===
Amongst audiences, Lu has garnered a reputation for her versatility, and portrayal of "out-of-the-box" roles. She is recognised for playing complex and multi-faceted, empowering female characters, who undergo growth arcs. After the broadcast of Love in the Clouds, it was reported that her popularity had increased amongst the 24-30 year old demographic, whilst after Love Between Lines, her popularity amongst viewers aged 18–23 also increased. According to DataWin observations, Lu's popularity across both higher-tier and lower-tier markets increased significantly during the airing of Love Between Lines. Audience data linked Lu's appeal to factors such as her strong sense of immersion in her characters, her micro-expressions, layered voice acting, ability to create contrast and tension, and her convincing portrayal of heartbreak during crying scenes.

=== Recognition from industry ===
Despite not having any formal acting training, Lu has received praise for her work from others in the Chinese entertainment industry. Her performance on the variety show Real Actor drew positive attention from the judges, and she was hailed a highly versatile actress. Similarly, she was praised for being a "chameleon actress" by the judges on Hit it Off, actor and director Francis Ng, and actress Joe Chen. Chinese screenwriter and showrunner Yu Zheng additionally praised Lu on Weibo, believing her to have great audience appeal and considering Lu a rare gem in the entertainment industry. In 2026, the director for Dancing with the Tide, Yang Wenjun, praised Lu's dedication to practising the nine-section whip for 2 months before filming commenced, stating "among the actresses born in '95, she's the only one who can fight like this!".

== Personal life ==
Self-described as a mostly "quiet person", Lu has stated she prefers to spend time with a few close friends, over socialising in noisy environments with large groups of people. In her free time, Lu enjoys artistic activities, such as drawing and painting. She also enjoys crafts such as sewing, and studied fashion design at university. Lu is also a fan of animals, revealing that playing with cats and dogs helps her to relax. In an interview for Love in the Clouds, it was revealed that Lu has nine cats. She also has 3 dogs, as of 2025.

== Filmography ==
=== Television and web series ===
Year	Title		Role	Network	Notes	Ref.
Year	English	Chinese	Role	Network	Notes	Ref.
2021	No Boundary	玉昭令	Qimu Yiluo	iQIYI	Support Role; Season 1–2	
2021	Good and Evil	百灵潭	Kui Er	Mango TV	Guest Role; Cameo (Ep. 3-5)	
2022	See You Tomorrow	明天也想见到你	Lian Geyao	iQIYI	Main Role	
2022	My Deepest Dream	乌云遇皎月	Wu Miao	Tencent Video	Support Role	
2022	Time and Him Are Just Right	时光与他，恰是正好	Lin Xi	Tencent Video	Main Role	
2023	To Ship Someone	全世界都在等你们分手	Song Yanqi / Xiao Qi	iQIYI	Main Role	
2023	The Longest Promise	玉骨谣	Bai Xueying	Tencent Video	Support Role	
2023	Love You Seven Times	七时吉祥	Jin Luo	iQIYI	Support Role	
2023	My Journey to You	云之羽	Shangguan Qian	iQIYI	Main Role	
2023	Parallel World	西出玉门	A He	Tencent Video	Support Role	
2023	Battle Through the Heaven	斗破苍穹之少年归来	Xiao Yixian	Tencent Video	Support Role	
2024	Blossoms in Adversity	惜花芷	Shao Yao	Youku	Support Role	
2024	Romance in the Alley	小巷人家	Li Jia	Hunan TV	Support Role	
2025	Perfect Match	五福临门	Kang Ning	Mango TV; Netflix	Main Role	
2025	Serendipity	榜上佳婿	Jian Mingshu	Tencent Video	Main Role	
2025	Love in the Clouds	入青云	Ming Yi	Youku; Netflix	Main Role	
2026	Love Between Lines	轧戏	Hu Xiu	iQIYI	Main Role	
2026	When I Meet the Moon	折月亮	Yun Li	iQIYI	Main Role	
TBA	Dancing with the Tide	何不同舟渡	Nan Yi	Mango TV; Hunan TV	Main Role	
TBA	Revenge	刺棠	Su Luowei	Tencent Video	Main Role	

=== Films ===
Year	Title		Role	Format	Notes	Ref.
Year	English	Chinese	Role	Format	Notes	Ref.
TBA	The Last Confession	谋杀者的告白	Lin Yu'An	Feature Film	Main Role	

=== Variety shows ===
Year	Title		Role	Notes	Ref.
Year	English	Chinese	Role	Notes	Ref.
2019	Real Actor	演技派	Regular Member	-	
2023	Hello, Saturday	你好，星期六	Guest	Ep.38	
2023	Hit it Off	拍即合的我们	Regular Member	Ep.3-7, 10	
2023	Ace vs Ace Season 8	王牌对王牌 第八季 ‧	Guest	Ep.9	
2023	Keep Running Nature Season	奔跑吧·生态篇	Guest	Ep.3-4, 7	
2024	Hello, Saturday 2024	你好，星期六 2024	Guest	Ep.38, 44	
2024	Sweet Tasks Season 6	甜蜜的任务 2024	Guest	Ep. 2	
2024	Da Re Men Lai Le	大热门来了	Guest	Ep. 8	
2024	My Little One Season 3	我家那闺女2024	Regular Member; Daughter	Ep. 2-8	
2025	Perfect Match: Friendship Sharing	五福临门团综·友福同享	Regular Member	-	
2025	Laugh Together	一见你就笑 ‧	Guest	Ep. 5	
2025	My Little One Season 4	我家那闺女2025	Guest; Observer	Ep.0-2	
2026	Hello, Saturday 2026	你好，星期六 2026	Guest	Ep. 2	

== Discography ==
=== Soundtrack appearances ===
Year	Title	Album
2022	"You" (你)	Time and Him are Just Right OST
2023	"Belong to Him" (归属地)	To Ship Someone OST
2025	"Pretend It's Nothing" (假装没什么)	Love in the Clouds OST

== Awards and nominations ==
Year	Award	Category	Nominated Work	Result	Ref.
2024	Weibo Awards 2023	Expected Actor of the Year	-	Won	
2024	4th New Era International Television Festival	Most Breakthrough Actress of the New Era	My Journey to You	Nominated	
2025	Weibo Awards 2024	Promising Actor of the Year	-	Won	
2025	2025 Bazaar Gala	Most Anticipated Actor	-	Won	
2025	Spokesperson Influence Ceremony	Quality of Life Influence Award	-	Won	
2026	Weibo Awards 2025	Notable Actor of the Year	-	Won	
2026	TV Drama Quality Ceremony	Annual Quality and Influential Drama Star	Love Between Lines	Won	
