= Oh My Lord =

Oh My Lord may refer to:

- Oh My Lord (TV series)
- "Oh My Lord," a song by Nick Cave and the Bad Seeds from their 2001 album No More Shall We Part
- "Oh My Lord," a song by Boney M. see Mary's Boy Child – Oh My Lord
- "Oh My Lord," a song by Ringo Starr from his 2005 album Choose Love
- "Oh My Lord," a song by Randy Bachman from his 2015 album Heavy Blues

== See also ==
- Oh Lord (disambiguation)
