= Peng Xiaoran =

Chinese actress

- Born: Beijing, China
- Education: Communication University of China
- Occupations: Actress, host
- Years active: 2013–present
- Agent: Fan Bingbing Studio

Chinese name
- Traditional Chinese: 彭小苒
- Simplified Chinese: 彭小苒
Transcriptions
Standard Mandarin
- Hanyu Pinyin: Péng Xiǎorǎn

Peng Xiaoran (Chinese: 彭小苒) is a Chinese actress and host. She is best known for her breakout role in the 2019 hit web-drama Goodbye My Princess.

== Filmography ==
=== Film ===
Year	English title	Chinese title	Role	Notes/Ref.
2016	Mo Jie Xiong Di	魔兽兄弟		
2016	Longmen Robbery	龙门劫案	Qian Qian	
2017	Sky Hunter	空天猎	News reporter	

=== Television series ===
Year	English title	Chinese title	Role	Network	Notes/Ref.
2014	Brothers Like This	香瓜七兄弟2	Female host	Liaoning TV	
2014	The Ferryman	灵魂摆渡	Zhou Jie	iQIYI	
2014	Hi-Tech Belle	高科技少女喵	Xiao Mei	iQIYI	
2014	Mysterious Summer	不可思议的夏天	Li Zihan	iQIYI	
2014	Tong Ju Sun You	同居损友	Bai Jie	iQIYI	
2016	The Mystic Nine	老九门	Huai Chan	iQIYI	
2019	Goodbye My Princess	东宫	Xiao Feng	Youku	
2021	Faith Makes Great	理想照耀中国	Qimuge	Hunan TV	Support role (from the segment: "Our Ulan Muqir")
2021	Refinement of Faith	百炼成钢	Tian Yu	Hunan TV, Mango TV	Support role (from the segment: "When Young Friends Come Together")
2021	Jun Jiu Ling	君九龄	Chu Jiuling	Youku	
2022	To Our Dreamland of Ice	冰雪之名	Li Binghe	BTV, CCTV-8, JSTV, Tencent, ZJTV	
2022	Shining Just for You	星河长明	Ye Ling Shuang	Youku	
2023	Romance of a Twin Flower	春闺梦里人	Ji Man / Nie Sangyu	Tencent	
2023	Scent of Time	为有暗香来	Bai Luo	Youku	Cameo
2023	Unshakable Faith	画眉	Pang Hongmei	Tencent	
2024	Melody of Golden Age	长乐曲	Zhao Xu (Young)	Hunan TV, Mango TV	Support role
2024	Fangs of Fortune	大梦归离	Miss Qi	iQIYI	Guest role
2025	Love in Pavilion	淮水竹亭	Jin Lan	iQIYI	Cameo
2025	Blood River	暗河传	Mu Yumo	Youku	
2025	Love and Crown	凤凰台上	Ling Cangcang	Youku	
TBA	My Talent Neighbour	走起！我的天才街坊	Shen Nuo	Youku	
TBA	The Legend of Ba Qing	巴清传	Ba Qifu	Youku	
TBA	The Boundless Bright Moon	明月苍茫	Feng Miaojun	iQIYI	

=== Variety show ===
Year	English title	Chinese title	Role	Network	Notes/Ref.
2013	iQiyi Zao Ban Ji	爱奇艺早班机	Host	iQiyi	
2019	Everybody Stand By	演员请就位	Contestant	Tencent	

== Awards and nominations ==
Year	Award	Category	Nominated work	Result	Ref.
2015	8th Variety Award Ceremony	Most Promising Female Host	—N/a	Won	
2019	26th Huading Awards	Best Actress (Historical drama)	Goodbye My Princess	Nominated	
2019	China Golden Rooster and Hundred Flowers Film Festival (1st Network Drama Awards)	Most Popular Actress	Goodbye My Princess	Won	
2019	Golden Bud - The Fourth Network Film And Television Festival	Best Actress	Goodbye My Princess	Nominated	
2019	Golden Bud - The Fourth Network Film And Television Festival	Most Popular Actress	Goodbye My Princess	Won	
