= Tan Jianci =

Chinese singer and actor (born 1990)

- 檀健次
- Born: October 5, 1990 (age 36); Beihai, Guangxi, China
- Education: Beijing Sport University
- Occupations: Actor; singer; dancer
- Years active: 2010–present
- Musical career
- Genre: C-pop
- Labels: Taihe Rye Music (2010–2018); Warner Music China (2026–present)
- Member of: M.I.C

Chinese name
- Simplified Chinese: 檀健次
Transcriptions
Standard Mandarin
- Hanyu Pinyin: Tán Jiàncì
- Website: https://m.weibo.cn/u/3606929931

Tan Jianci (Chinese: 檀健次; pinyin: Tán Jiàncì; born October 5, 1990), also known by his stage name JC-T, is a Chinese actor, singer, and dancer. He is the youngest member of the Chinese idol group M.I.C. Tan Jianci is active as an actor in China and is known for his roles as Sima Zhao in The Advisors Alliance (2017), Cao Pi in Secret of the Three Kingdoms (2018), Chen Renxiang in Winter Begonia (2020), Shen Yi in Under the Skin (2022), and Xiang Liu / Fangfeng Bei in Lost You Forever (2023). He has been a permanent cast of the variety show Hello Saturday since 2022.

== Early life ==
Tan Jianci was born and raised in Beihai, Guangxi. He studied at the Beihai Haicheng No.3 Elementary School. At the age of six, he moved to Kumamoto, Japan with his family for a year. While living there, he changed his own name to Kenji (健次) due to his adoration for Kenshiro, a fictional character and the protagonist of the Fist of the North Star manga series. He returned to China at the age of seven and attended Beihai No. 3 Primary School of Guangxi. Inspired by Michael Jackson, he began to take dance classes in his spare time. At the age of 13, he attended the affiliated secondary school of Beijing Dance Academy where he learned professional ballroom dance. In 2006, he participated in three tournaments, Taoli Cup National Dance Competition – Latin (where he finished in first place in the group under 16), the National Dance Sport Championships Professional – Latin (1st place) and Modern (5th place) and the World Grand Prix Finals in Shanghai – IDSF – Latin (3rd place) and Modern (4th place). In 2007, he was admitted to the Beijing Sport University's Art department.

== Career ==
=== Music ===
In 2006, Tan Jianci was chosen as a trainee for Taihe Rye Music's project group, began a three-year training period in 2007. Adopting the stage name JC-T, he debuted as a member of the boy group M.I.C at the 2009 World Cyber Games (WCG) in Chengdu. That same year, the group competed in MIGU Star Academy and won the finals. M.I.C officially debuted in October 2010.

Tan release his first solo single titled Fly Away in December 2014. After several years, he made a career pivot to concentrate on acting in 2018, using his given name, Tan Jianci.

After a two-year hiatus, Tan returned to the stage in the variety show, Super Shine! Brothers. Three years later, on April 20, 2023, Tan released his first solo album, DREAMS. The album contains 16 tracks (eight songs and eight instrumentals), with a mix of ballads and two dance numbers, Imma Get It and Imma Get It (KAKA Remix).

In 2023, Tan released several original soundtrack singles for the dramas, Lost You Forever, and Love Me Love My Voice. The single, The Wait that Can't Be Waited (Chinese: 等不到的等待) marks Tan's first song to hit the top 20 on the China TME UNI Chart Top 100, debuting at number 11, and staying on the charts for twelve weeks.

Following a whirlwind year in 2023, Tan made a comeback at the Hunan TV spring festival show with his title single, Bad Mona Lisa, from his second album, Brilliance (Chinese: 焕). On June 12, 2024, the eight track album was released on Chinese platforms. In the second week of release, seven songs hit the China TME UNI Chart Top 100. The songs were carefully curated by Tan to tell a different story, among which, INU debuted as his first English song.

On September 26, 2026, it was announced via Warner Music Beijing on Weibo that Tan had joined hands with Warner Music China to launch a global strategic partnership, marking the release of his third solo album, TANGENT. Upon release, the album did exceptionally well overseas and charted in multiple countries on iTunes, including 1st in Hong Kong, 1st in Taiwan, 1st in Singapore, 1st in Malaysia, 2nd in Vietnam, 2nd in Thailand, 4th in Australia, and 6th in Canada.

=== Acting ===
Throughout Tan's acting career, he had experimented with all kinds of genres, including several low budget indie projects. At the age of 16, Tan was cast as Xiao Chuan, marking his acting debut in 2008, portraying a bereaved and sullen teenager. The coming of age film, Lost Indulgence, directed by Zhang Yibai, explores several themes of lost, lust, love, and teen angst.

Between 2015 and 2017, Tan appeared in a couple of acting projects—his first drama Hua Yang Jiang Hu (2015), first musical Tiny Times (2015), an adaptation from the film same name, and his first historical drama The Advisors Alliance (2017), as Sima Zhao, the second son of the protagonist Sima Yi. Tan received recognition for his acting skills ifor his portrayal of Sima Zhao.

Following his decision to pivot careers in 2018, Tan starred in Secret of the Three Kingdoms , where he portrayed Cao Pi, the second son of Cao Cao and the first emperor of Wei Dynasty. He then starred in the drama Never Gone, a coming of age romance drama about the group dynamics of childhood friends as they navigate adulthood, college, careers, and love. Tan portrays Zhou Ziyi, an athletic, carefree and frivolous young adult, on a soccer scholarship.

2019-2020 marks some significant landmark projects for Tan. After starring in the family drama Over the Sea I Come to You (2019), romance comedy film Adoring (2019), and family drama Centimeter of Love (2019), Tan starred in republican drama Winter Begonia (2020) and received praise for his performance as an opera singer. The same year he was cast in the drama Winner Is King, adapted from novel Sha Po Lang by Priest alongside Chen Zheyuan. His role as Gu Yun, a military commander, marks Tan's first male lead role. The drama license expired in May 2024, and the project has been shelved.

Tan's domestic breakthrough moment came in 2022 with his portrayal of Shen Yi, a genius painter who joined the police force to repay for his involvement in the death of a police officer. The IQIYI drama, Under the Skin, was a dark horse success. Season two was approved in 2023, and filming started in Spring 2024, wrapping up in June 2024. Tan also starred as the charismatic, Qin Huai, from Are You Safe?. The role nailed him two acting nominations at the Macau International TV Festival, including Best Performance by an Actor in a Television Series, Outstanding Actor Award.

In 2023, Tan rose to international stardom for his portrayal of Xiang Liu, the Chenrong (Shennong) General of the resistance army, in the drama, Lost You Forever. Billed in a special guest role, Tan will bring to life the demon general based on the Chinese classical book The Classic of Mountains and Seas, propelling him into the A-list and earning him several acting awards. Lost You Forever is a live adaptation of Eternal Yearning, a novel by the Chinese novelist Tong Hua. Director Zhen Qin stated Tan 'was always the only candidate for the role of Xiang Liu."

In the same year, Tan wrapped up the filming of Go East, a historical costume drama based on the Chinese novel, Records of Kings of the Western Regions (Sifang Pavilion). Shortly after wrapping up filming, Tan's urban romance drama with Zhou Ye, Love Me Love My Voice aired on Tencent. While the drama was airing, Tan started filming Filter, a drama based on an original screenplay by Tong Hua.

In 2024, season 2 of Lost You Forever, aired in July 2024. In August, Go East aired on IQIYI.

Tan joined a new film project as announced on his Weibo account in February 2025. On February 24, 2025, Tan reunited with writer Tong Hua for the contemporary fantasy drama Filter, based on an original screenplay.

Tan was officially announced as the top-billed lead in the historical drama Dancing with the Tide, based on the novel of the same name by Xianyuke. Filming commenced on January 25, 2026. As of June 19, 2026 filming was completed and it is currently in post-production.

=== Variety shows ===
Tan has participated in several variety shows, spanning from his idol years in M.I.C to the present day. He is known for his participation in the dance competition show Shake It Up in March 2012, where he placed fourth in the final round. Tan's acting was showcased on the competition show I Am the Actor (2018), where he earned approval from the audience and achieved an A grade on the show.

He made his stage re-debut as an contestant in Shine Super! Brothers (2020), where he placed first place. In 2022, Tan joined several of his idol colleagues, Meng Jia and Rainie Yang, as mentors for the college dance competition Campus Go, which was hosted by KUN.

In 2022, Tan became a permanent member of the popular variety show, Hello Saturday. He renewed his contract for 2024.

== Filmography ==
=== Film ===
Year	English title	Chinese title	Role	Ref.
2007	Lost Indulgence	秘岸	Xiao Chuan	
2016	Scary Notes	恐怖笔记	Zou Yan	
2016	Master Surrender: The Devil	天师伏魔·弑魂	Gao Yuan	
2016	Lord Rebirth	魔王重生	Gao Yuan	
2019	Adoring	宠爱	Luo Hua	
2024	I Miss You	被我弄丢的你	Bai Xiaoyu	
2025	Sound of Silence	震耳欲聋	Li Qi	
2026	My Story, Your Love Concert Tour Film	《多见一次》个人巡回演唱会大电影	Self	
2026	V	空枪	Qi Honggang	

=== Television series ===
Year	English title	Chinese title	Role	Network	Ref.
2014	Soul Food	深爱食堂	Xiao Bo	Zhejiang TV	
2014	Strength to Fly	将爱因为爱情	Shi Yilang	Tencent	
2015	Hua Yang Jiang Hu	花样江湖	Jian Ci	Mango TV	
2015	Intouchable	男神执事团	Hua Shengsu	Sohu TV	
2017	The Advisors Alliance	大军师司马懿之军师联盟	Sima Zhao	Anhui TV, Jiangsu TV	
2017	Growling Tiger, Roaring Dragon	大军师司马懿之虎啸龙吟	Sima Zhao	Youku	
2018	Secret of the Three Kingdoms	三国机密之潜龙在渊	Cao Pi	Tencent	
2018	Never Gone	原来你还在这里	Zhou Ziyi	Youku	
2019	Over the Sea I Come to You	带着爸爸去留学	Chen Kaiwen	Dragon TV, Zhejiang TV	
2020	Wu Xin: The Monster Killer 3	无心法师3	Monkey Demon	iQiyi, Tencent, Youku	
2020	Winter Begonia	鬓边不是海棠红	Chen Renxiang	iQiyi	
2020	The Centimeter of Love	爱的厘米	Guan Zhenlei	Hunan TV	
2020	Twisted Fate of Love	今夕何夕	Pang Yu	Tencent	
2021	Court Lady	骊歌行	Li Ke	iQiyi, Tencent, Youku	
2021	Everybody in the House	一宅家族	Jian Cilang	iQiyi	
2022	Under the Skin	猎罪图鉴	Shen Yi	iQiyi, Tencent	
2022	Are You Safe	你安全吗	Qin Huai	Tencent	
2023	Lost You Forever	长相思	Xiang Liu/ Fang Feng Bei	Tencent	
2023	Love Me Love My Voice	很想很想你	Mo Qingcheng	Tencent	
2024	Lost You Forever 2	长相思2	Xiang Liu/ Fang Feng Bei	Tencent	
2024	Go East	四方馆	Yuan Mo	iQIYI	
2024	Under the Skin 2	猎罪图鉴2	Shen Yi	iQIYI, Tencent	
2025	Filter	滤镜	Tang Qi	Tencent	
2026	Love Has Fireworks	爱情有烟火	Li Yifei	CCTV-8, Tencent, iQIYI	
Upcoming	Dancing with the Tide	何不同舟渡	Xie Queshan / Xie Chao'en	Hunan TV, Mango TV	
shelved	Winner Is King	烽火流金	Gu Yun	Tencent	

=== Television ===
Year	English title	Chinese title	Role	Network	Notes/Ref.
2018	Day Day Up	天天向上	Guest	Hunan TV	20180701
2018	I Am the Actor	我就是演员	Contestant	Zhejiang TV	
2019	Happy Camp	快乐大本营	Guest	Hunan TV	20190302
2019	Happy Camp	快乐大本营	Guest	Hunan TV	20191221
2020	The Treasured Voice (Season 1)	天赐的声音 (第一季)	Contestant	Zhejiang TV	Ep. 5
2020	Laughing	笑起来真好看	Contestant	Mango TV	Overall champion
2020	Happy Camp	快乐大本营	Guest	Hunan TV	20200530
2020	Crossover Singer (Season 5)	跨界歌王 (第五季)	Contestant	Beijing TV	
2020	Shine! Super Brothers	追光吧！哥哥	Contestant	Dragon TV, Youku	
2021	The Pursuit of Happiness	念念桃花源	Guest	Zhejiang TV	Ep. 9
2021	Happy Camp	快乐大本营	Guest	Hunan TV	20210710
2021	Chinese Restaurant (Season 5)	中餐厅 (第五季)	Guilin	Mango TV	Ep. 5–9
2021	Go Shoot	接招吧！前辈	Guest	Dragon TV	Ep. 3
2022	Let's Go Skiing	超有趣滑雪大会	Guest	iQiyi	Ep. 2–4
2022	Snow Day	飘雪的日子来看你	Guest	BTV, Youku	Ep. 5
2022	Hi!6	你好，星期六	Permanent Member	Hunan TV	
2022	The Treasured Voice (Season 3)	天赐的声音 (第三季)	Contestant	Zhejiang TV	Ep. 4
2022	Campus Go	沸腾校园	Permanent Member	Tencent	
2023	Our Inn	我们的客栈	Guest	Zhejiang Satellite TV, iQIYI, Tencent, Youku	Ep. 10
2023	Circle of Sound 2	声生不息·宝岛季	Guest	Hunan TV	Ep. 6–7
2023	Hi!6	你好，星期六	Permanent Member	Hunan TV	
2024	Hi!6	你好，星期六	Permanent Member	Hunan TV	

=== Music Videos ===
Year	English title	Chinese title	Singer	Album	Notes/Ref.
2013		风起来的时光	Zhou Ziyan		
2026	"PROOF"		Tan Jianci	TANGENT	
	"DEAD REFLEX"	绝处逢生	Tan Jianci	TANGENT	Choreography by: Jing Wei and Ingyoo Kim; Directed by: Lee Han Gyeol

== Discography ==
=== Studio Albums ===
- DREAMS (2023)
- 焕 (2024)
- TANGENT (2026)

=== Singles ===
Year	English title	Chinese title	Album	Notes/Ref.
2014	"Fly Away"		Solo	
2014	"Ladybro"	闺蜜	Solo	with Zhang Yongxin (Steelo)
2018	"The Memories I Want to Keep"	最想保存的回忆	My Classmate From Far Far Away OST	
2019	"Adoring"	宠爱	Adoring OST	
2020	If You're Thinking of Me	如果你也在想我	Twisted Fate of Love OST	
2022	Under the Skin	猎罪图鉴	Under the Skin OST	
2023	Dreams		Dreams (1st album)	
2023	"Favor Mortal Fireworks"	偏爱人间烟火	Lost You Forever OST	with Yang Zi (actress)
2023	"The Wait That Can't Be Waited"	等不到的等待	Lost You Forever OST	
2024	Brilliance	焕	Brilliance (2nd album)	
2024	"Peach Blossom Blood"	桃花血	Lost You Forever OST	
	"Portrait"	畫像	Under the Skin II OST	
	"Walk with the Light"	和光同往	Under the Skin II OST	
	”Do Not Answer"	不要回答	3 Body Problem OST	
2025	"The Alpaca Song"	羊驼之歌	Filter OST	
	"Say Goodbye Well"	好好告别	Filter OST	
	"Pride and Prejudice"	傲慢與偏見	Filter OST	
	"Solitary"	孤	"Three Kingdoms: Starlit Heroes" theme song	
2025	"Deafening"	震耳欲聾	"Sound of Silence" theme song	
2026	"Chong"	宠		

== Awards and nominations ==
Year	Award	Category	Nominated work	Result	Ref.
2020	7th The Actors of China Award Ceremony	Best Actor (Emerald)	—N/a	Nominated	
2021	Douyin Star Motion Night	Screen-Fusion Vitality Actor		Won	
	Douyin Star Motion Night	Shining Artist of the Year		Won	
	Jury Award	Quality Potential Actor		Won	
2022	Weibo Vision Conference	Expected Actor of the Year		Won	
	Zhihu Annual Award	Actor of the Year	Under the Skin	Won	
	New Era International TV Festival	Most Popular Actor Award	Under the Skin	Won	
2023	Tencent Video All Star Award 2023	All-around Artist of the Year		Won	
2023	Tencent Video All Star Award 2023	VIP Star of the Year		Won	
	Asian Television Award	Best Leading Male Performance - Digital	Are You Safe?	Nominated	
	Weibo Awards Ceremony	Leap Actor of the Year	Under the Skin	Won	
	Weibo TV & Internet Video Summit	Best Appeal Actor of the Year	Lost You Forever	Won	
	Tencent Video Starlight Awards	All-Around Artist of the Year		Won	
	Tencent Video Starlight Awards	VIP Star of the Year		Won	
	Huading Awards	Spotted Conch Award (Most Popular Actor in a Television Series)	Under the Skin	Won	
	Chinese Music Song Center	All-Around Artist of the Year		Won	
	Chinese Music Song Center	Top Ten Golden Songs of the Year	“路过，人间烟火”	Won	
	Chinese Music Song Center	Best Album of the Year	DREAMS	Won	
	Chinese Music Song Center	Top 100 Works of the Year	5 songs listed including "IMMA GET IT"	Won	
2025	QQ Music Super Peak Night	Popular Male Singer		Won	
	QQ Music Super Peak Night	Top All-Round Artist of the Year		Won	
	Tencent Video All Star Night	Star Actor of the Year		Won	
	Tencent Video All Star Night	JUMP Medal of the Year		Won	
	Tencent Video All Star Night	Tencent Video VIP Star		Won	
2026	QQ Music Super Peak Night	Best Male Singer		Won	
	QQ Music Super Peak Night	Most Popular Male Singer		Won	
	QQ Music Super Peak Night	Top All-Round Artist of the Year		Won	
2026	21st Changchun Film Festival	Best Actor	震耳欲聋(Sound of Silence)	Won	
