= Zhu Zanjin =

Chinese actor (1995-)

- Born: 16 September 1995 (age 30); Haikou, Hainan, China
- Education: Beijing Normal University
- Occupations: Actor, dancer
- Years active: 2015-present

Zhu Zanjin (Chinese: 朱贊錦; pinyin: Zhū Zàn Jǐn) (born on 16 September 1995) is a Chinese actor and dancer and graduated from Beijing Normal University with a major in dance. He made his debut as an actor in the 2015 television series Demon Girl. Since then he has appeared in a number of other film and television productions, including the 2018 xianxia drama The Untamed in which he played the character of Jin Guangyao. He reprised this role in the 2020 spin-off film Fatal Journey.

== Selected filmography ==
=== Television series ===
| Year | English title | Chinese title | Role |
|---|---|---|---|
| 2015 | Demon Girl | 半妖傾城 | A Xiang |
| 2017 | Above the Clouds | 云巅之上 | Liang Jianmin |
| 2018 | Woman in Love | 海上嫁女記 | Bai Haoran |
| 2018 | Tang Dynasty Tour | 唐磚 | Li Tai |
| 2019 | Goodbye My Princess | 東宮 | Zhao Shixuan |
| 2019 | The Untamed | 陈情令 | Jin Guangyao (Meng Yao) |
| 2021 | Miss the Dragon | 遇龍 | Star Lord Ming Ge |
| 2023 | Wulin Has Squeamish | 武林有骄气 | Cang Qi |
| TBA | Legend of Ba Qing | 巴清传 | Han Gongzi |
| TBA | The Legends of Monkey King | 大潑猴 | Xu Du |
| TBA | The Entangled Life of Qingluo | 蔓蔓青夢 | Cheng Siyue |
| 2026 | Pursuit of Jade | 逐玉 | Song Yan (face) |

=== Film ===
| Year | English title | Chinese title | Role | Network |
|---|---|---|---|---|
| 2018 | Skin Painter 2 | 畫皮師2 | Mu Yiqian | iQIYI |
| 2020 | Fatal Journey | 陈情令之乱魄 | Jin Guangyao (Meng Yao） | iQIYI |
| 2022 | The Mystic Nine: Qing Shan Hai Tang | 老九門之青山海棠 | Er Yue Hong | iQIYI |
