= Love Between Lines =

2026 Chinese television series

- Promotional poster
- Also known as: Ga Xi; Ya Xi; 軋戲
- Simplified Chinese: 轧戏
- Hanyu Pinyin: Gá Xì
- Genre: Romance; Suspense; Mystery
- Based on: Ga Xi (轧戏) by Zu Le
- Written by: Li Xinwei; Shi Yuchen; Shi Ye; Liu Yue
- Directed by: Mao De Shu (Cattree) [zh]
- Starring: Chen Xingxu; Lu Yuxiao
- Opening theme: "Love Between Lines" (轧戏) by Peng Meng
- Ending theme: "Named Your Expectation" (以你为名的期许) by Yen J [zh]
- Country of origin: China
- Original language: Mandarin
- No. of episodes: 28

Production
- Executive producer: Qi Shuai
- Producer: Wu Ruoyan
- Production location: Shanghai, China
- Running time: 45 minutes
- Production companies: iQIYI; Linmon Pictures [zh]; Qing Linmon

Original release
- Network: iQIYI; Dragon TV [zh]
- Release: 9 January – 20 January 2026

Love Between Lines (Chinese: 轧戏; pinyin: Gá Xì) is a 2026 Chinese romantic television series written by Li Xinwei, based on the web novel Zu Le (祖乐) by author Zhang Zu Le, directed by Mao De Shu and starring Chen Xingxu and Lu Yuxiao. The drama is noted for its unique "dual narrative" structure, which intertwines a modern urban romance with an immersive, Republic of China-era murder mystery game (jubensha). The series premiered on January 9, 2026, on iQIYI and Dragon TV.

== Synopsis ==
The story follows Hu Xiu (Lu Yuxiao), a woman dealing with personal upheaval who joins a Republic of China-themed murder mystery game (Jubensha). Inside the game, she meets Qin Xiao Yi (Chen Xingxu), an NPC/actor whose character draws her in. When she unexpectedly encounters him in real life as Xiao Zhiyu, the lines between their fictional roles and real-world identities begin to blur. The drama explores the psychological "masking" people use in modern society and the authenticity of feelings developed through performance.

== Cast ==
=== Main ===
- Chen Xingxu as Xiao Zhiyu / Qin Xiaoyi
  In the real world, Xiao Zhiyu is a professional architect known for his serious and dedicated work ethic. In the murder mystery game (Jubensha), he plays Qin Xiaoyi, a mysterious spy operating in the shadows of 1930s Shanghai. His life becomes complicated when he begins to develop real feelings for a player that mirror his character's scripted romance.
- Lu Yuxiao as Hu Xiu
  A young woman who recently went through a difficult breakup and personal crisis. Seeking a temporary escape from reality, she joins an immersive murder mystery game. She is an "elite player" whose sharp intuition allows her to see through the game's plots, but she finds herself unable to see through her growing attraction to the game's NPC, Xiao Zhiyu.

=== Supporting ===
- Dai Xu as Pei Zhen
  CEO of Zhuling Group and stepbrother of Xiao Zhiyu.
- Li Tingting as Zhao Xiao Rou/"Lao Zhao"
  Hu Xiu's best friend. She supports Hu Xiu through her life and is married to Wang Guang Ming.
- Ma Sichao as Gong Huai Cong
  Zhiyu's close friend and main owner of the murder-mystery game.
- Ren Youlun as Wang Guang Ming
- Zhao Haohong
  Part of the ensemble cast playing roles within the Republic of China game scenarios.
