= Goodbye My Princess =

2019 Chinese television series

- Also known as: Eastern Palace
- Traditional Chinese: 東宮
- Simplified Chinese: 东宫
- Hanyu Pinyin: Dōng Gōng
- Genre: Romance; Historical fiction; Melodrama
- Based on: Dong Gong by Fei Wo Si Cun
- Written by: Qian Yu; Wang Yihan; Xu Xiaolin; Hu Rong; Liu Xiao; He Yitong
- Directed by: Li Muge
- Starring: Chen Xingxu; Peng Xiaoran; Shawn Wei
- Ending theme: Love Catastrophe by Xiao Shi
- Country of origin: China
- Original language: Mandarin
- No. of seasons: 1
- No. of episodes: 52

Production
- Producers: Li Huan; Wang Botong
- Production locations: Beijing; Bashang Grassland; Dunhuang; Hengdian World Studios
- Running time: 45 mins
- Production companies: Talent Film & Television; Youku; HualuBaina Film & TV; HS Entertainment; Meinong Entertainment

Original release
- Network: Youku
- Release: February 14 – March 25, 2019

Goodbye My Princess (Chinese: 东宫; pinyin: Dōng Gōng; lit. 'Eastern Palace') is a 2019 Chinese television series based on the novel Eastern Palace by Fei Wo Si Cun starring Chen Xingxu, Peng Xiaoran, and Shawn Wei. It aired on Youku starting February 14, 2019. It had a score of 7.5 points on Douban.

== Synopsis ==
Qu Xiaofeng (Peng Xiaoran), the innocent beloved princess of Western Liang, is promised to the Crown Prince of the Li dynasty in a political marriage between the two countries.

Under the deliberate arrangement of Gu Jian (Shawn Wei), fifth prince Li Chengyin (Chen Xingxu) disguises himself as an ordinary tea merchant by the name Gu Xiaowu, and meets Qu Xiaofeng. They fall in love with each other as Li Chengyin tries to gain her trust to infiltrate Danchi, the tribe ruled by Xiaofeng's maternal grandfather. He kills Xiaofeng's grandfather and massacres her tribe in order to gain merits and become the new crown prince. After discovering the truth behind Li Chengyin's actions, she jumps down the River of Forgetfulness to lose the painful memories. Li Chengyin, shocked at Xiaofeng's decision, follows suit.

Several months later, Xiaofeng is now married to Li Chengyin, who is now the crown prince of the Li dynasty. Both have lost memories of their previous relationship. Although the Crown Prince is the second most powerful person in the country, the Eastern Palace, where he lives, is one of the most dangerous places. Due to all the schemes and betrayals in the Eastern Palace, Xiaofeng and Chengyin's lives begin to intersect and somewhere buried within are hidden memories yet to resurface.

== Cast ==
=== Main ===
- Chen Xingxu as Li Chengyin / Gu Xiaowu
  - Fifth Prince → Crown Prince → Emperor
    - Initially a carefree and innocent man, Li Chengyin turned ambitious and cruel after knowing the truth behind his mother and elder brother's death. He is a cunning and deceptive man who is skilled in maneuvering politics and hiding his true feelings.
      Despite using Xiaofeng for his political gains, he truly falls in love with her. After losing his memory, he falls in love with her again for the second time but also causes her unbearable pain and anguish.
- Peng Xiaoran as Qu Xiaofeng
  - Ninth princess of Western Liang → Crown princess of the Li dynasty.
    - Innocent, naive, kind and bubbly. She falls in love with Gu Xiaowu, but pained by his betrayal and her family's tragedy, she jumps into the River of Forgetfulness to forget about their love. She falls in love with Li Chengyin for the second time, but is unwilling to open up her heart to him as she believes that Li Chengyin loves Zhao Sese.
- Shawn Wei as Gu Jian
  - Li Chengyin's maternal cousin. Xiaofeng's teacher.
    - The last descendant of the Gu family. He has feelings for Xiaofeng, but can never show them as he is tasked with avenging the Gu family's massacre. He was reluctantly forced by his teacher to assist Li Chengyin in using Xiaofeng to eliminate Danchi, and later uses his remaining life to make redemption to Xiaofeng out of guilt and love for her.

=== Supporting ===
==== Li dynasty ====
===== Imperial Family =====
- Gallen Lo as the Emperor
- Siqin Gaowa as the Empress Dowager
- Zhang Dinghan as Zhang Meiniang
  - The empress.
- Gao Yihan as Gao Ruyi
  - Noble Consort Gao. Gao Yuming's daughter.
- Wang Jiaqi as Gu Yuyao
  - Consort Shu. Li Chengyin's deceased birth mother. Gu Jian's paternal aunt.
    - She was the Emperor's most beloved woman.
- Zhang Tong as Wei Xiuyi
  - Consort Wei. Li Chengmei's birth mother.
- Dong Xian as Consort De
- Yao Anlian as Prince Zhong
  - The Emperor's brother.
- Kristy Yang as Princess Mingyuan
  - The Emperor’s younger sister. Qu Wencheng's concubine.
    - She dotes on Li Chengyin and is the one who revealed the truth of his mother's death to him.
- Zhang Aoyue as Li Chengji
  - The crown prince.
    - He is killed in an attack planned by Li Chengye.
- Kingone Wang as Li Chengye
  - Prince Xuande, the second prince; later the crown prince.
    - A cruel and power-hungry man who kills Li Chengji and attempts to assassinate the Emperor in order to attain the throne.
- Yang Tong as Li Chengmei
  - Prince Rong, the third prince.
- Jin Xuanyu as Li Chengyuan
  - Prince Yun, the fourth prince.
- Xia Wa as Zhao Sese
  - Zhao Jingyu's daughter. Li Chengyin's concubine.
    - A cunning and deceptive woman who hides behind an innocent and weak facade. She loves Li Chengyin and tries to sabotage both Xiaofeng and Concubine Xu many times. She later becomes insane after Li Chengyin tells her that he never loved her and was only using her.
- Cheng Xiaomeng as Princess Yongning
  - Seventh princess.
    - One of Xiaofeng's good friends in the palace.
- Chen Jinru as Princess Luoxi
  - Eighth princess.
    - She has been in love with Pei Zhao since she was young and later marries him. One of Xiaofeng's good friends in the palace.

====== Officials and generals ======
- Wang Zhifei as Gao Yuming
  - The prime minister. Noble Consort Gao's father.
    - He is at odds with the Emperor and attempts to control Li Chengyin to secure his position at court.
- Wang Guan as Pei Zhao
  - The commander of the Yulin Army. Li Chengyin's loyal subordinate. Grand Princess Pingnan's son. Princess Luoxi's husband.
    - He feels guilty towards Xiaofeng and showers her with extra kindness and protection in the palace.
- Fan Linfeng as Li Yan
  - Prince Zhong's son. Li Chengye's loyal subordinate.
- Lu Xing as Gao Xian
  - General Dingyuan. Gao Yuming's eldest son.
- Yu Bin as Gao Kun
  - The minister of revenue. Gao Yuming's second son.
- Feng Xiaotong as Gao Zhen
  - An assistant minister. Gao Yuming's third son.
    - A playboy and gambler. He is exposed for his crimes and killed in a planned attack by his rival, Zhao Shixuan.
- Zhao Tao as Zhao Jingyu ** The duke of Zhenbei. Zhao Sese's father.
- Zhu Zanjin as Zhao Shixuan
  - An assistant minister. Zhao Jingyu's son. Zhao Sese's brother.
- Wang Han as Zeng Xian
  - The commander of the Shenwu Army.
- Li Jianxin as Ye Cheng
  - The grand secretary.
- Cheng Guodong as Xi Qingzhuo
  - The minister of rites.
- Wang Huan as Gu Ruhui
  - A former minister. Gu Jian's father.
    - He was falsely accused and killed by Gao Yuming.
- Han Jinghuo as Zhang Can
  - The left commander of the Yulin Army. The Empress' nephew. Pei Zhao's subordinate.
    - He was killed by Gao Zhen.
- Shen Baoping as Wang Shu
  - An official of the Court of Judicial Review.
- Han Xuanlong as Scholar Li
  - Li Chengyin's teacher.
- Shen Xuewei as Scholar Fang
  - Li Chengyin's teacher.
    - He was tasked to watch over Li Chengyin by Gao Yuming.
- Fan Shende as Minister An
  - He was killed by Gao Xian while protecting Xiaofeng from being taken away.
- Fan Jinlun as Yuan Tong
  - Gao Xian's subordinate.
- Wang Yueyao as Leng Kun
  - Li Yan's subordinate. *** He took on the identity of Batu'er and admitted to killing the Crown Prince.

====== Servants ======
- Jiang Changyi as Cao Jiu
  - Chief eunuch. The Emperor's personal attendant.
- Gao Yuan as Shi'en
  - Li Chengyin's personal attendant.
- Gu Jia as Yongniang
  - Xiaofeng's personal attendant.
    - She is sent to serve Xiaofeng by the Empress Dowager, and does her best to protect Xiaofeng.
- Wang Tongyu as Rongshuang
  - The Empress' personal attendant.
    - She is extremely loyal to the Empress, and attempts to assassinate Li Chengyin for her.
- Li Wenlong as Wei Shen
  - The Empress' personal attendant.
- Yu Han as Xuniang
  - A maid serving the Empress.
    - After becoming pregnant with Zhang Can's child, she is instructed by the Empress to lie that the child belongs to Li Chengyin, and become his concubine. She is later secretly sent out of the palace by Li Chengyin.
- Li Na as Ying'er
  - A maid serving the Empress.
    - She is instructed by the Empress to spy on Li Chengyin in the Eastern Palace.
- Shang Siqi as Chan'er
  - A maid serving Li Chengye.
    - She is sent to Li Chengyin and frames him for poisoning Xiaofeng. She is later killed by the Emperor in order to protect Li Chengye.
- Gao Xirui as Jin'er
  - Zhao Sese's personal attendant.
- Shen Xuewei as Fang Shangyi
  - Etiquette teacher who is responsible for Xiaofeng.
- Zhu Xinfang as Physician Wang

====== Others ======
- Shao Feng as Chaimu
  - Leader of the Qianlong Sect; Gu Jian's godfather
    - He is actually Chen Zheng, an official of the Li dynasty who was falsely accused by Gao Yuming. He is later killed by the Emperor.
- Wei Xiaohan as Mingyue
  - A famous courtesan from the Mingyu Brothel → A concubine of the Emperor.
    - She is actually Chen Yan, Chen Zheng's daughter. Gu Jian's childhood friend, and one of Xiaofeng's good friends. She later becomes the Emperor's concubine and commits suicide after her father's death.
- Guan Le as Miluo
  - Owner of Miluo Wine House.
    - One of Xiaofeng's good friends. She is secretly in love with Pei Zhao.
- Zhao Renjie as Huxiao
  - Chai Mu's subordinate.
- Lu Keke as Taojian
  - A member of the Qianlong Sect.
- Guo Junke as Sun'er
  - An assassin under Li Chengyin.
- Zhuang Qingning as Madame Peiguo
  - The Empress' mother.
- Han Ying as Madame Zhang
  - Zhang Can's mother.
- Wei Yiyi as Xiaowei
  - Shopkeeper of the cosmetics and clothing shop Weipin Pavilion.
- Xu Min as Mother Wang
- Owner of the Mingyu Brothel.

==== Western Liang ====
===== Western Liang Palace =====
- Jiang Kai as Qu Wencheng
  - The emperor. Xiaofeng's father.
    - He becomes insane after witnessing his wife committing suicide.
- Tian Ling as Ashina Yun
  - The empress. Daughter of King Tömür. Xiaofeng's mother.
    - She is reluctant to marry off Xiaofeng to the Central Plains and sends her off to Danchi to prevent it. In the end, she is forced to commit suicide by Gao Xian.
- Hu Chunyong as Qu Tianze
  - A prince. Xiaofeng's brother.
- Li Mingde as Dimo
  - The Empress' personal attendant.
- Fang Shuai as Lahemeng
  - The minister of relations.
- Zhao Zhengang as Divine Doctor

===== Danchi Tribe =====
- Zhang Xiaoning as King Tömür
  - The leader of Danchi Tribe. Xiaofeng's maternal grandfather.
  - He is beheaded by Li Chengyin in the war between the Li dynasty and Danchi.
- Zhang Ge as Yimoyan
  - A grandson of King Tömür. Xiaofeng's cousin.
    - He dies in the war between the Li dynasty and Danchi.
- Zhang Hengrui as Heshi
  - A great warrior of Danchi. A'du's brother.
    - He dies in the war between the Li dynasty and Danchi.
- Najima as A'du
  - Xiaofeng's good friend and loyal servant.
    - She pretends to be a mute in order to stay by Xiaofeng's side. She is killed by Gao Xian after assassinating Gao Xiao.
- Tian Xinyu as Batu'er
  - A man from Danchi who is framed for killing the Crown Prince of the Li dynasty. He is later killed by Li Yan on their journey to the Central Plains and replaced by Li Yan's subordinate to make it seem like Danchi is responsible for the death of the Crown Prince.

===== Shuobo =====
- Hao Wenxue as the King
- Zhao Longhao as Prince Lidun
  - A nephew of the King.
    - He colludes with Li Chengyin to eliminate Danchi.
- Chen Tao as Yuan Ge
  - A general.

== Production ==
The series was filmed between August 2017 and February 2018. Filming also took place in Beijing, Bashang Grassland, Dunhuang and at the Hengdian World Studios. The series reportedly had a production budget of 200 million yuan.

== Reception ==
The series has earned positive reviews since its premiere, due to the outstanding performance of the cast, beautiful costumes and fitting props, as well as high-quality cinematography. The writing was also praised for staying true to the classic scenes within the novel, while adding additional scenes that fleshed out the details and allowed the plot to unfold steadily.

== Soundtrack ==
No.	Title	Lyrics	Music	Singers	Length
1.	"First Encounter (初见)" (Theme song)	Li Yufei	Feng Da	Yu Shaoyuan & Ye Li	4:29
2.	"Little Fox (小狐狸)" (Insert song)	Feiwo Sicun	Feng Da	Ye Li	3:09
3.	"Love Catastrophe (爱殇)" (Ending theme song)	Wang Yijie	Xiao Huan	Xiao Shi
4.	"Love Catastrophe – Male Version (爱殇男版)" (Insert song)	Wang Yijie	Xiao Huan	Xiao Huan

== Awards and nominations ==
Award	Category	Nominated work	Result	Ref.
26th Huading Awards	Best Actor (Historical drama)	Chen Xingxu	Nominated	
26th Huading Awards	Best Actress (Historical drama)	Peng Xiaoran	Nominated	
China Golden Rooster and Hundred Flowers Film Festival (1st Network Drama Awards)	Most Popular Actress	Peng Xiaoran	Won	
Golden Bud – The Fourth Network Film And Television Festival	Best Web Series	Goodbye My Princess	Nominated	
Golden Bud – The Fourth Network Film And Television Festival	Top Ten Web Series	Goodbye My Princess	Won	
Golden Bud – The Fourth Network Film And Television Festival	Best Actor	Chen Xingxu	Nominated	
Golden Bud – The Fourth Network Film And Television Festival	Best Actress	Peng Xiaoran	Nominated	
Golden Bud – The Fourth Network Film And Television Festival	Most Popular Actress	Peng Xiaoran	Won	
Baidu Fudian Awards	Top Ten Television Series		Won	
Sina Film & TV Award Ceremony	Top Ten Television Series		Won	

== International broadcast ==
- Korea
- Taiwan
- Vietnam – TTV11 May 22, 2019
