= The Glory of Youth =

- Also known as: Trumpeter In Place
- Genre: Drama; Military drama
- Based on: Graduated, Being A Soldier by Feng Jie
- Written by: Ying Liang Peng; Zu Rong Meng; Xue Tian Zhi; Feng Jie
- Directed by: Li Lu; Zhang Han Bing
- Starring: Li Yifeng; Chen Xingxu; Xiao Yang
- Ending theme: Go Forward by Jason Zhang
- Country of origin: China
- Original language: Mandarin
- No. of episodes: 49

Production
- Executive producers: Liu Bin; Zhang Ximeng
- Producers: Duan Yan zhang Bohui; Yin Xiangjin; Xie Ying; Li Shuang
- Production locations: Qingdao, Shandong, Shangrao, Jiangxi, Zhejiang
- Cinematography: Wang Lidong
- Editor: Liang Yu
- Running time: 45 mins
- Production companies: The Chinese People's Liberation Army Rocket Force; Xi'an Qujiang Film and Television Investment (Group) Co., Ltd. Baimo Film Industry (Beijing) Co., Ltd.

Original release
- Network: Zhejiang TV; Jiangsu TV; Youku
- Release: 13 April – 11 May 2021

The Glory of Youth (Chinese: 号手就位; Chinese: 號手就位; pinyin: Hào Shǒu Jiù Wèi) is a Chinese military drama television series based on Feng Jie's novel Graduated, Being A Soldier, developed & produced by The Chinese People's Liberation Army Rocket Force, Starring Li Yifeng, Chen Xingxu, Zhang Xinyu and Xiao Yang, the series aired on Zhejiang TV, Jiangsu TV and Youku from 13 April to 11 May 2021. A special edited version (VIP Exclusive version) aired on Youku (VIP members) on May 20, 2021.

== Synopsis ==
A story about "Xia Zhuo" (Li Yifeng), a top-class college student, who won the world college student super brain competition but was framed; his roommate and rival "Ouyang Jun" (Chen Xingxu) was also disqualified from his degree for cheating; and Xia Zhuo's 2 buddies, "Lin Anbang" (Duan Bowen), and "Yi Zimeng" (Dong Chunhui). Chose to join the army and become soldiers for the rocket force. The four walked into the Rocket Army's ace troop-270 brigade. The brigade commander "An Lei" (Yu Bo) is determined to form a highly maneuverable troop, "Warblade Company". Mobilized the best recruits with the best veterans, the four elders of the 270 brigade "Lang Yongcheng" (Xiao Yang), "Chen Haofeng" (Jiang Tong), "Wang Xianmin" (Fan Lei), "Hou Jidong" (Chunyu Shanshan) to join this experimental troop. The changes between veterans and recruits are slowly taking place in the troop. The fusion between them has made this troop the whetstone of the entire Rocket Army. Under the leadership and inspiration of veterans with unique skills, this group of Rocket Army recruits experienced both physical and mental tempering, and eventually grew and transformed into the "Ace Trumpeter" of the Chinese Rocket Army.

== Cast ==
=== Main ===
- Li Yifeng as Xia Zhuo

A genius, who has both IQ and honor. Born in an intellectual family. Joining the Rockets Army after seeing a missile launch. His appearance made the leader a headache, he could always raise questions about anything. During his service in the military, he used his wisdom and perseverance to complete many difficult tasks. Under the influence of the troops and comrades, he gradually found his life goal: to become a real soldier.

- Chen Xingxu as Ouyang Jun

A lone wolf. He was Xia Zhuo's classmate, but they have never been friends. His degree was canceled due to his cheating on exams, so he joins the army. The only goal is to go to the military academy to be promoted. Under the care of army veterans, Xia Zhuo, and others, he gradually transformed into an outstanding rocket army that values comradeship.

- Zhang Xinyu as Huang Wen

The Rocket Army's psychologist

- Xiao Yang as Lang Yongcheng

Squad leader, specialized in driving an army truck rocket launcher

- Duan Bowen as Lin Anbang

Xia Zhuo's best friend, fun-loving

- Dong Chunhui as Yi Zimeng

Xia Zhuo's best friend, sloppy king, dream to be a singer

=== Supporting ===
- Wang Daqi as Lu Zheng (Company commander)
- Yu Bo as An Lei (270 Brigade commander)
- Jiang Tong as Chen Haofeng
- Fan Lei as Wang Xianmin
- Chunyu Shanshan as Hou Jidong
- Zhang Ruonan as Liang Nuo (Xia Zhuo's girlfriend)
- Zheng Xiaoning as Liang Kewen
- Sang Mingsheng as Shao Shuai (Instructor)
- Zhu Lingwu as Yan Yibing (Hygienist)
- Zhang Shen as Huang Li (The chief designer of DF-185 missile)
- Yu Xiaoming as Yang Wanjin
- Yu Zhen as Yu Quanhai
- Gao Jin as Qi Peng (Battalion commander)
- Du Yuan as Fan Chao
- Wen Zhengrong as Li Manwen (Xia Zhuo's mother)
- Zhao Yansong as Xia Weilin (Xia Zhuo's father)
- Zheng Yu as Ouyang Hua (Ouyang Jun's father)
- Deng Sha as Teacher Zhou (An Lei's wife)
- Wang Yingxin as An Lei's daughter
- Cao Xuheng as Qiao Dawei
- Lu Yan as Wang Tian
- Shi Zhaoqi as Fang Zhenjun
- Zhang Zhengyang as Wang Jinying
- Na Jiawei as Zhuo Wukui
- Dong Yanlin as Wang Guangwu
- Ni Min as Kou Xiangrui
- Wang Zepei as Chen Jialiang
- Li Mingxuan as He Lei
- Du Juan as Zuo Li
- Qiao Shengyi as Liu Ji
- Mu Dong as Li Mang
- Kang Lei as Qin Li

== Production ==
The overall production process of the play requires live shooting in a large number of military facilities. For this reason, the crew took several months to build a military defense center in the Dongfang Sunac Film Metropolis. On October 7, 2019, Filming was started in Qingdao and was finished in Jiangshan, Zhejiang on January 20, 2020,

The television version weight on the military parts from the beginning. And there was an urgent edit before the broadcast, cause some parts of the story missing. So there's a special version that was later released on Youku.

== Soundtrack ==
No.	Title	Lyrics	Music	Singers	Length
1.	"Go forward《向前冲》" (Opening/Ending theme song)	Duan Sisi	Gao Lianyue	Jason Zhang
2.	"Camouflage《迷彩》"	Liu Chang	Huang Bo	Chen Xiang
3.	"Close up《特写》"	Liu Chang	Tang Kaidun	Zhang Xinyu
4.	"Graduated, Being A Soldier《毕业了去当兵》"	Duan Sisi	Tan Xuan	Dong Chunhui
5.	"Ignition《点火》"	Quyuan	Hu Xudong	Dong Chunhui
6.	"Rocketman's Dream《火箭兵的梦》"	Chen Feng	Chu Xingyuan	Dong Chunhui
7.	"Farewell《送别》"	Li Shutong	John Oldway	Zhang Ruonan
8.	"Little Apple《小苹果》"	Wang Taili	Wang Taili	Xiao Yang
9.	"Riding on My Beloved Motorcycle《骑上我心爱的小摩托》"	Jingdi	Jingdi	Xiao Yang
10.	"Laundry Song《洗衣歌》"	Luo Nianyi, Li Junchen, Dong Rong	Luo Nianyi	Duan Bowen, Dong Chunhui
11.	"Kangding Love Song《康定情歌》"		Jiang Dingxian	Duan Bowen
12.	"Obao Meet《敖包相会》"	Ma la qin fu	Song Fu	Duan Bowen
13.	"The Return of Targeting《打靶归来》"	Niu Baoyuan, Wang Yongquan	Wang Yongquan	Xiao Yang, Fan Lei, Jiang Tong, ChunYu Shanshan

== Broadcasts outside China ==
The series was picked up by RTHK in Hong Kong, as part of the new Chinese TV series strand on RTHK TV 31 in a bid to instill patriotism in Hong Kong people.
