= See You Tomorrow (TV series) =

Chinese romance series

- Official poster
- Genre: Romance, Youth
- Directed by: Liu Mao
- Starring: Bunny Zhang; Zhang Kang Le; Roy Xie; Lu Yu Xiao
- Country of origin: China
- Original language: Mandarin
- No. of episodes: 12

Production
- Executive producer: cattree
- Running time: 30 minutes

Original release
- Network: iQIYI
- Release: 14 April 2022

See You Tomorrow (Chinese: 明天也想见到你), is a 2022 Chinese romance series, starring Bunny Zhang, Zhang Kang Le, Roy Xie and Lu Yu Xiao. The series was released on 14 April 2022 on IQIYI and is also available on iQiyi app and iQ.com.

== Cast ==
- Bunny Zhang as Ding Liaoliao
- Zhang Kang Le as Jiang Kan
- Roy Xie as Ding Man
- Lu Yu Xiao as Lian Geyao
