= Oh Lord =

Oh Lord may refer to:

- "Oh Lord" (In This Moment song), 2017
- "Oh Lord" (Mic Lowry song), 2017
- "Oh Lord", a song by Blackbear from the 2015 album Help
- "Oh Lord", a song by Jessie J from the 2018 album R.O.S.E.
- "Oh Lord", a song by Foxy Shazam from their 2010 self-titled album

== See also ==
- Oh My Lord (disambiguation)
