= M.I.C. (band) =

Chinese boy band

M.I.C. (MIC男团)
- Also known as: MIC
- Origin: Beijing, China
- Genres: Pop, R&B
- Years active: 2006–2018
- Label: Taihe Rye Music
- Members: Wang Hao; Xiao Shunyao; Zhao Yongxin; Chi Yuehan; Tan Jianci

M.I.C. (MIC男团) was a five-member Chinese boy band, which started in 2006 and released a debut EP in October 2010. The band won some of the most important Asian entertainment business awards, including the Top Chinese Music Awards, Shanghai Media Group's "ERS Chinese Top Ten 2010" and the Vanguard 2010 Music Event, and released albums in 2011 and 2012. In 2015, the band released the album SOLO, featuring six songs composed by band member Zhao Yongxin.

Two members of the original band – Tan Jianci and Xiao Shunyao – left M.I.C. to pursue other career opportunities. The band remained active as a trio through the 2018. However, as of 2023, they had not formally disbanded.

== History ==
In 2006, music company Taihe Rye Music sought to establish an ad-hoc boy band to become the next big thing in the Asian music market. Around 20 out of over 20,000 auditioned talents were chosen to become candidate members of the band, after a nationwide search in hundreds of performing arts schools in more than 20 provinces and cities. The candidates underwent four years of song and dance training. The final five candidates were selected after a talent show on Dragon TV, on March 26, 2010.

On July 27, 2010, M.I.C.'s debut single "Yàomìng de fánnǎo" ("Terrible trouble") was released, and the EP "ROCK STAR" followed in October. "Bàn mèng" ("Semi-dream") was a hit in August 2011, and the music video for another single, "Fēngbào xiàtiān" ("Storm summer"), became the most watched music video of August 2011.

Their first full-length album, V, was released in 2011, with "Get It Hot" as the first single.

== Members ==
- Phibian (Wang Hao)
- Steelo Z. (Zhao Yongxin)
- Aero (Xiao Shunyao)
- CJ Swag (Chi Yuehan)
- JC-T Tan Jianci

== Discography ==
=== Albums ===
- Rock Star (2010, Taihe Rye Music)
Track listing

1. Rock Star
2. 要命的烦恼(Terrible Trouble)
3. 漫游记(Roaming Mind)
4. 这次，真的是你不对 (This time you're really wrong)
5. 第几幕的爱 (The first of several acts of love)
- V (2011, Taihe Rye)
Track listing
1. Get It Hot
2. 望 That Sea (Gazing at the sea)
3. To Bad Girls
4. Dance with M.I.C.
5. 买单 (Pay the bills)
6. 当你看着我的眼睛 (When you looked into my eyes)
7. 非常21世纪 (Very 21st century)
8. 心恋(Heart love)
9. You are so cute
10. 将爱(Love)
- 色.Color (2012, Taihe Rye)
Track listing
1. 宿醉 (Hangover)
2. 宿醉Part.2 (Hangover Part.2)
3. 谁孤单 (Who's Lonely)
4. 对白 (Dialogue)
5. 春心荡漾 (Flirting with Heart)
6. My Place
7. Lonely Night
8. 窒息 (Suffocation)
9. 海 (The Sea)
10. 我还爱着你 (I'm Still Loving You)
- SOLO (2014, Taihe Rye)
Track listing
1. Only One
2. Super Daddy
3. Fly Away
4. I Can Say
5. Ladybro 闺蜜
6. Lost Angels 那个他
7. Wonderful Life
8. Don't Want to See You 不想见你
9. Me and Myself 我和我自己 ft Gemini
10. Don't Touch My Jordan
11. Future
- M.I.C. (2017, Taihe Rye)
Track listing
1. Mad Love
2. Tell Me What You Want
3. Years of Our Youth 年华

=== Singles ===
- Believe in the Future 相信未来 (2013)
- Dream Chasing Legend 逐梦传奇 (2015)
- Angel Beside Me 天使在我身边 (2016)
- Beautiful Myth 美丽的神话 (2016)
- Super Magic Century 非常魔法世纪 (2011)
- Storm in the Summer 风暴夏天 (2011)
- Half Dream 半梦 (2011)
- The Pipa Drumming On My Heartstrings 弹起我心爱的土琵琶 (2011)
- Sweet Dreams (2010)
- Poker Face (2010)
- Lollipop (2010)
- Beyond the Game (2009)

== Concerts ==
- X Party (2012)

== Filmography ==
- In the name of light and a dream 以光与梦之名 (2012)
- Love's Time Machine 90后青春手写体——爱的时光机 (2012)
- M.I.C (M.I.C.男团) (2012) (Self-titled manga released on Comic Guests)
- Let's Shake It 舞林大会 (2012)
- Hua Yang Jiang Hu 花样江湖 (2015)
- New Opera Show 国色天香 (2015)

== Recognitions ==
- 2014 Music Radio China Top Music Awards:
  - Most Popular Group (China)
  - Most Popular Campus Group
- 2014 2nd V Chart Awards:
  - Most Trendy Artist
  - Best Group (China)
- 2014 Chinese Golden Bell Award for Music: Group Award (Gold)
- 2013 TVB8 Mandarin Music On Demand Awards:
  - Best Group
  - Best Song (Drunk Part 2)
  - Most Popular Male Singer
- 2013 9+2 Music Pioneer Awards: Online Popular Group
- 2013 Chinese Music Media Awards: Best Dance Song (Color)
- 2013 MSN Fashion Awards: Best Musical Group
- 2013 Music Radio China Top Music Awards: Most Popular Group (China)
- 2013 1st V Chart Awards: Best Group (China)
- 2013 Hong Kong Asian-Pop Music Festival:
  - Best Stage Interpretation
  - Weibo Popularity Award
  - Asian New Star Award
- 2012 Migu Music Awards: Most Popular Group (China)
- 2012 TVB8 Mandarin Music On Demand Awards:
  - Most Popular Male Singer (China)
  - Most Popular Group
  - Golden Song Award
- 2012 Beijing Pop Music Awards: Most Popular Group
- 2011 CCTV Finding the Most Beautiful Voice: Champion
- 2011 TVB8 Mandarin Music On Demand Awards: Most Popular Group (Bronze)
- 2011 4th Top Chinese Music Chart Breakthrough New Artist Awards: Best Group
- 2011 11th Chinese Music Media Awards: Best Dance Artist
- 5th Migu Music Awards: Best Selling Newcomer
- 2011 Music Radio China Top Music Awards:
  - Best Golden Song (Rock Star)
  - Most Popular Campus Group
- 2011 15th China Music Awards: Best Newcomer
- 2011 11th TOP Chinese Music Awards:
  - New Force of the Year
  - Best Newcomer
- 2011 9+2 Music Pioneer Awards:
  - Trendy Dance Group
  - Trendy New Group
- 2011 18th ERC Chinese Top Ten Music Awards: Newcomer Award (Silver)
- 2011 Beijing Pop Music Awards: Golden Song Award (Rock Star)
- 2010 3rd Top Chinese Music Chart Breakthrough New Artist Awards: Best New Group
- 5th Fans Anniversary Award: Most Commercially Valuable Prize
- 2010 Migu Music Academy: Champion
