= Chen Xingxu =

Chinese actor

- Born: 31 March 1996 (age 30); Shenyang, Liaoning, China
- Education: Central Academy of Drama
- Occupation: Actor
- Years active: 2000–present

Chinese name
- Traditional Chinese: 陳星旭
- Simplified Chinese: 陈星旭
Transcriptions
Standard Mandarin
- Hanyu Pinyin: Chén Xīngxù

Chen Xingxu (Chinese: 陈星旭, born 31 March 1996), also known as Oliver Chen, is a Chinese actor and model. He is known for his roles as Yang Kang in The Legend of the Condor Heroes (2017), Gu Xiaowu / Li Chengyin in Goodbye My Princess (2019), Tan Xuan Lin in Fall In Love (2021), and Shaodian Youqin in The Starry Love (2023).

== Early life and education ==
Chen Xingxu was born on 31 March 1996 in Shenyang, Liaoning, China. He was recruited by a scout when he was 3 years old in the park, and began to shoot advertisements. He shot his first TV series at the age of 4. Although Chen Xingxu was born in Shenyang, his mother works in Beijing, so she brought him to Beijing and let him study in elementary school at Beijing Haidian District Foreign Language Experimental School. He was later enrolled in Beijing Dance Academy Affiliated High School where he completed his middle and high school. In 2014, Chen Xingxu was admitted to the Central Academy of Drama with first place in the performance department.

Chen enrolled in the Performance Department (Acting Department) of the Central Academy of Drama in 2014 and graduated in 2018.

== Career ==
In 1999, Chen Xingxu was discovered by scouts while playing in a zoo and shot a series of commercials.

=== 2001–2010: Early career as child actor ===
Chen first appeared as child actor in the 2001 TV series A Passionate Life which stars Lü Liping.

In 2005, he participated in the military war drama The Door to the Wind. In 2006, he starred as Pan Dongzi in the modern children TV series Sparkling Red Star. In 2007, he starred in the historical series The Legend of Meng Li Ju, playing the role of young crown prince. In 2010, he starred in the romance film The Love of Hawthorn Tree.

=== 2017–present: Rising popularity ===
In 2017, Chen started to gain increased attention and popularity with his role as Yang Kang in the wuxia drama The Legend of the Condor Heroes, adapted from Jin Yong's novel of the same name.

In 2019, Chen starred in the historical romance drama Goodbye My Princess, based on novel by Fei Wo Si Cun. The drama was a success and achieved a cult following. Chen received positive reviews for his portrayal of Gu Xiaowu/Li Chengyin, which led to increased popularity for him. He was then cast in modern drama The Best of Times, followed by military drama The Glory of Youth.

In 2020, Chen starred in the romance fantasy web film The Enchanting Phantom, adapted from the 1987 film A Chinese Ghost Story.

In 2023, he was in the fantasy drama The Starry Love with Landi Li, which showcased his acting and comedic talents as he played five different versions of the male lead character.

In 2024, he starred as the titular boss in the romantic comedy My Boss with Zhang Ruonan. He also was the male lead Xiao Yicheng next to Victoria Song in the business romance Our Interpreter, which aired in January 2024 on Hunan TV.

In 2026, Chen played the male lead Xiao Zhiyu opposite Lu Yuxiao in the urban romance drama Love Between Lines, which premiered on 09th January on iQIYI and DragonTV. Chen also starred as Gao Haiming in My Page in the 90s alongside Wang Yuwen which aired January 22 on Tencent.

== Filmography ==
=== Film ===
Year	English title	Chinese title	Role	Notes
2010	Under the Hawthorn Tree	山楂樹之戀	San's Brother (younger brother)	
2015	Beijing & New York	北京纽约	Shaonian Lanyī	
2017	Once Upon a Time	三生三世十里桃花	Li Yiguan	
2019	Youthful China in the Headlines	头条里的青春中国		Short film
2020	The Enchanting Phantom	倩女幽魂之人间情	Ning Caichen	
2020	Wolf Killing Action	特種兵王之決不妥協	Zhou Yang	

=== Television series ===
Year	English title	Chinese title	Role	Notes
2001	A Passionate Life	激情燃燒的歲月	Shi Hai (young)	
2003	Cao Xueqin	曹雪芹	Liu'er	
2006	Jiangmen Fengyun	將門風雲	Zhou Nanzheng (young)	
2006	You Are My Life	你是我的命	Tang Hao (young)	
2007	Sparkling Red Star	閃閃的紅星	Pan Dongzi	
2007	Golden Marriage	金婚	Dabao (young)	
2007	Another Lifetime of Fate: Legend of Meng Lijun	再生緣之孟麗君傳	Crown prince	
2007	Blazing Day	烈日炎炎	Luo Liangku	
2007	Qiu Haitang	秋海棠	Yuan Shaoheng (young)	
2012	Su Dongpo	苏东坡	young Emperor Zhezong	
2017	The Legend of the Condor Heroes	射雕英雄传	Yang Kang	
2019	Goodbye My Princess	東宮	Gu Xiaowu / Li Chengyin	
2020	The Best of Times	最好的时代	Li Yanfeng	
2021	The Glory of Youth	号手就位	Ouyang Jun	
2021	Truth	真相	Lin Yuanhao	
2021	Fall in Love	一见倾心	Tan Xuanlin	
2023	The Starry Love	星落凝成糖	Shao Dian You Qin / Empyrean Xuan Shang / La Mu / Mei You Qing / Wen Ren	
2024	My Boss	你也有今天	Qian Heng	
2024	Our Interpreter	我们的翻译官	Xiao Yicheng	
2024	A Beautiful Lie	你的谎言也动听	Xing Zhizhi	
2025	Love on the Turquoise Land	枭起青壤	Yan Tuo	
2026	Love Between Lines	轧戏	Xiao Zhiyu / Qin Xiaoyi	
2026	My Page in the 90s	突然的喜欢	Gao Haiming	
TBA	The Noble	金枝	Lu Xingzhi	
TBA	Guardians of the Lands	山河表里	Chu Huan	
TBA	Love You in the Dark	红掌	Lu Xizhou	

== Awards and nominations ==
Year	Award	Category	Nominated work	Result	Ref.
2019	2nd Modern Night Out	Most Commercially Valuable Actor	—N/a	Won	
2019	26th Huading Awards	Best Actor (Historical drama)	Goodbye My Princess	Nominated	
2019	Golden Bud - The Fourth Network Film And Television Festival	Best Actor	Goodbye My Princess	Nominated	
