= Dancing with the Tide =

- Traditional Chinese: 何不同舟渡
- Simplified Chinese: 何不同舟渡
- Literal meaning: Why Not Cross the River Together
- Hanyu Pinyin: Hé bù tóng zhōu dù
- Genre: Historical; Political intrigue; Romance
- Based on: Why Not Cross the River Together (何不同舟渡) by Xian Yu Ke
- Written by: Huang Fen
- Directed by: Yang Wenjun
- Starring: Tan Jianci; Lu Yuxiao
- Country of origin: China
- Original language: Mandarin

Production
- Executive producers: Lü Hanshi; Xu Yi; Li Zheng
- Producers: Dai Linzhi; Su Shiyu; Wu Zhifei
- Production locations: Hengdian World Studios, China
- Production companies: Mango TV; Hunan TV; Mango Media; Mango TV's Full Studio; Perfect World Pictures; Li Zheng Studio; Tomato Novels

Original release
- Network: Mango TV; Hunan TV

Dancing with the Tide (Chinese: 何不同舟渡; pinyin: Hé bùtóng zhōudù) is an upcoming Chinese historical spy drama, starring Tan Jianci and Lu Yuxiao. Written by Huang Fen, and directed by Yang Wenjun, the series is adapted from the web novel Why Not Cross the River Together, by Xian Yu Ke. It is scheduled to premiere on streaming platforms Mango TV and Hunan TV.

== Synopsis ==
The story follows Xie Queshan (Tan Jianci), a general burdened with the label of being a traitor, who tracks down Nan Yi (Lu Yuxiao), a petty thief who accidentally steals a letter of military importance from him. From a life-or-death chase, lasting only an incense stick worth of time, Xie Queshan and Nan Yi eventually form a strategic alliance, amidst a backdrop of political instability in a divided nation.

Gradually, the two begin to rely on each other, and work together to resolve dangerous situations. As their bond deepens, the secrets behind Xie Queshan's cold exterior start to unravel, whilst Nan Yi grows from a low-level thief struggling to survive, into a strong, independent spy with loyalty for her country, who lives with dignity through her own abilities.

The two weather the storm together, sharing their hearts amidst the turmoil, and jointly protecting their homeland.

== Cast ==
=== Main ===
- Tan Jianci as Xie Queshan: A general trapped in a dangerous dual identity, forced to walk a lonely path through the shadows of betrayal and public misunderstanding, while covertly serving as his country’s ultimate shield.
- Lu Yuxiao as Nan Yi:A resilient woman who transforms from a petty thief struggling for survival into a spy and righteous nationalist under the guidance of Xie Queshan.
- Zhao Zhaoyi as Xie Sui'an
- Yin Haoyu as Zhang Yuehui
- Cao Jun Song Muchuan
- Xu Zhengxi as Xiahou Jun: A cold and suspicious minister.

=== Special appearances ===
- Li Meng as Nangong Puruo
- Ye Zuxin as Xie Hengzai
- He Qiu as Xu Kouyue
- Chen Shu as Xie Tang'an (Lady Gantang)
- Wang Jinsong as Shen Zhizhong
- Zhou Chengao
- Zheng Yecheng as Pang Yu

== Production ==
=== Background ===
On April 8, 2024, it was announced that Perfect World Pictures and Li Zheng Studio had acquired the film and television rights to Why Not Cross the River Together, a historical spy, romance, and political intrigue novel by author Xian Yu Ke. Published on Tomato Novels, the book received a score of 9.7 with 85,000 reviews, and consistently ranked in the top 3 of the platform's high-scoring list. According to platform data, it ranked 1st on Tomato's completed novel list and 2nd on its popularity list, making it a significant intellectual property on the platform.

=== Development ===
On June 24, 2024, Dancing with the Tide was selected for Tencent's 2024 drama list, and a concept poster was released. On October 18, 2024, the show was selected for Tencent's 2025 film and television list. The drama's platform was later changed from Tencent TV to Mango TV, where it would receive greater allocation of resources. In September 2025, the drama was registered.

The series is produced by Mango TV, Hunan TV, and Mango Media, with Mango TV's Full Studio, Perfect World Pictures, Li Zheng Studio, and Tomato Novel as co-producers. It has a total investment of over 8 million yuan per episode. The screenplay is primarily written by Huang Fen, whilst Yang Wenjun is the general director. Yang previously won Shanghai TV Festival's Magnolia Award for Best Director.

=== Casting ===
The cast of Dancing with the Tide was officially announced on January 25, 2026, with Tan Jianci and Lu Yuxiao in starring roles.

=== Filming ===
The booting ceremony was held on January 25, 2026, at Hengdian World Studios, and principal photography commenced that day. Filming ended in mid-June, 2026. The series is scheduled to premiere simultaneously on Hunan TV and Mango TV, with a total of 32 episodes.

== Marketing ==
A staggered promotional strategy was used to market the series. On January 25, 2026, the first stills of Tan Jianci and Lu Yuxiao as their characters were released by the official team, in addition to behind-the-scenes footage of the pair's costume fittings. On February 14, 2026, a promotional poster was released for Valentine's Day, depicting Nan Yi (Lu Yuxiao) and Xie Queshan (Tan Jianci) raising a toast to each other. The poster generated significant buzz for the series, with the related hashtag garnering over 100 million views in a single day, and earning it the title of "the pinnacle of aesthetics for period dramas in 2026" from the media. On February 17, additional posters were released to commemorate the Chinese New Year. On May 28, at the 2026 Mango TV Spring Summer Growth Conference, the first trailer for the series was released. Additional character stills and behind-the-scenes footage was released after filming ended, on June 19, 2026. The wrap-up special garnered praise on the internet for its "raw realism and atmosphere", alongside the leads' acting.
