= Oh My Lord (TV series) =

Chinese romantic series

- Teaser poster
- Genre: Romance; Ancient Costume
- Directed by: Cai Jun Ai
- Starring: Luo Zheng; Ji Meihan
- Country of origin: China
- Original language: Mandarin
- No. of episodes: 15

Production
- Producer: Chen Wen
- Running time: 30 minutes
- Production company: Guo Pai

Original release
- Network: iQIYI
- Release: 14 February 2022

Oh My Lord (Chinese: 惹不起的千岁大人) is a 2022 Chinese romantic costume series, starring Luo Zheng and Ji Meihan. The series is based on the novel of the same title by Jinjiang Literature City. The series airs on iQIYI from February 14, 2022, and is also available on iQiyi app and iQ.com.

== Synopsis ==
Chen Youyou, a young girl with a strong life force is forced to marry Bai Li, who concealed his identity as a false eunuch for many years in Fuxian City. After experiencing, they fall in love with each other. This is a story about love and growth.

== Cast ==
- Luo Zheng as Bai Li
- Ji Meihan as Chen Youyou
- Chen Ming Hao as Qi Shengwen
- Yang Yi Mo as Jiang Bihan
- Hu Wei as Gu Tian He
- Zhu Mei Ji as Xiaotiao

== Production ==
The series began filming in September 2021 in Hengdian.
