= IQIYI =

Chinese video streaming service

iQIYI
- IQIYI's logo used since April 2022

- Screenshot Screenshot of iQIYI home page
- Website type: OTT platform
- Available in: 6 languages
- List of languages: Chinese; English; Indonesian; Tamil; Vietnamese; Thai
- Traded as: Nasdaq: IQ (ADS)
- Founded: January 6, 2010; 16 years ago
- Headquarters: Beijing, China
- Country of origin: China
- Area served: Worldwide (Note: As of 2019, iQIYI directly operates in Mainland China, Hong Kong (in English and Cantonese only), Macau (in Portuguese and Cantonese only), Taiwan (until 2020), Malaysia, Singapore, Myanmar, Thailand, Cambodia, Philippines, Vietnam and Indonesia. In other countries iQIYI operates indirectly through third parties)
- Founder: Gong Yu
- Key people: He Junjie (Chairman); Gong Yu (founder & CEO)
- Industry: Entertainment; mass media
- Products: Streaming media; video on demand; digital distribution
- Services: Film production; Film distribution; Television production; Television distribution
- Revenue: ▼CN¥29.23 billion (US$3.90 billion, 2025)
- Net income: ▼ −CN¥206 million (−US$29.5 million, 2025)
- Parent: Baidu
- Website: www.iqiyi.com
- Users: 101.4 million paid subscribers
- Launched: April 22, 2010; 16 years ago
- Current status: Active

IQIYI
- Traditional Chinese: 愛奇藝
- Simplified Chinese: 爱奇艺
- Literal meaning: love wonderful art
Transcriptions
Standard Mandarin
- Hanyu Pinyin: Àiqíyì
- Bopomofo: ㄞˋ ㄑㄧˊ ㄧˋ
- Wade–Giles: Ai^{4}-ch‘i^{2}-i^{4}
- IPA: [âɪ.tɕʰǐ.î]
Yue: Cantonese
- Yale Romanization: Oikèihngaih
- Jyutping: oi3 kei4 ngai6
- IPA: [ɔj˧.kʰej˩.ŋɐj˨]

iQIYI (Chinese: 爱奇艺; pinyin: Àiqíyì, pronounced in English as eye-CHEE-yee), formerly Qiyi (奇艺; Qíyì), is a Chinese subscription video on-demand over-the-top streaming television service owned by Baidu. The service primarily distributes original and acquired films and television shows from various genres.

iQIYI is currently one of the largest online video sites in the world, with nearly 6 billion hours spent on its service each month and over 500 million monthly active users. On March 29, 2018, the company issued its initial public offering in the United States and raised $2.25 billion.

== History ==
=== 2010s ===
Qiyi was founded on January 6, 2010, by Baidu with support from Providence Equity Partners. It changed its name to iQIYI in November 2011. On November 2, 2012, Baidu bought Providence's stake and took full ownership. On May 7, 2013, Baidu purchased the online video business of PPStream Inc. for $370 million, which later became a subsidiary of iQIYI. On July 17, 2014, the site launched its film production division, iQIYI Motion Pictures, to expand existing cooperative projects with overseas peers, including purchasing releases and co-producing movies. On September 4, iQIYI collaborated with the Venice Film Festival, streaming the festival's movies online. In August 2014, iQIYI generated over 6.95 billion hours of viewing on its website. In October, iQIYI participated in the Busan Film Festival, signing exclusive rights to nearly 100 South Korean titles. On November 19, 2014, Xiaomi and Shunwei Capital invested $300 million in iQIYI for about 10 percent to 15 percent of the site, while Baidu invested an additional $100 million and held about 80 percent.

In September 2014, iQIYI had established a Chinese Communist Party (CCP) committee inside the company, according to the official newspaper of the Central Committee of the Chinese Communist Party, the People's Daily. In November 2014, following the National Radio and Television Administration's ban on all live-streaming of American TV shows, iQIYI's vice editor-in-chief defended the ban, stating that such content was against "socialist values."

On December 8, 2014, iQIYI's chief content officer, Ma Dong, said the portal planned to more than double original production in 2015, with at least 30 titles and 500 episodes on the slate compared to 13 in 2014. In 2015, iQIYI purchased the streaming rights to eight top entertainment shows in mainland China and several entertainment shows in Taiwan and South Korea, including Running Man. In March 2016, it was announced that it would launch in Taiwan. In June 2016, it was reported that it had 20 million subscribers.

In June 2014, iQIYI co-produced and distributed the drama Mysterious Summer with major Japanese broadcaster Fuji TV. It was the first drama co-production between China and Japan and has been viewed more than 60 million times as of October 2014.

In 2017, the People Daily reported that two thirds of high-level staff in iQIYI's content department were CCP members.

On April 25, 2017, Netflix (which does not operate at all in China) announced that it had reached a licensing deal with iQIYI, under which some Netflix original productions would be available on iQIYI day-and-date with their premieres worldwide. In December 2017, Nintendo and Nvidia announced a partnership with iQIYI.

In November 2018, iQIYI announced that it was raising new cash. The video business said that iQIYI raised issue $500 million in convertible senior notes. Proceeds from the offering will go towards content and technology investments as well as capped call transactions to reduce potential dilution to shareholders upon conversion of the notes.

=== 2020s ===
iQIYI has not been available in Taiwan since October 15, 2020 due to a ban on partnerships with mainland Chinese video streaming companies after iQIYI was found to be used by China's Taiwan Affairs Office for conducting united front activities on the island.

In December 2020, iQIYI opened a new office in Singapore at Robinson Road to serve as the regional headquarters for Southeast Asia.

In 2020, iQIYI announced the production of My Roommate Is a Gumiho as its first Korean Original Series. Due to positive reviews over their first self-produced series, which starred Jang Ki-yong and Girl's Day member Lee Hye-ri, iQIYI expressed that they gained confidence in releasing more original Korean dramas produced under its name, like their announced upcoming productions of dramas like Bad and Crazy (starring Lee Dong-wook, Han Ji-eun and Wi Ha-joon) in 2021 and Shooting Stars in 2022, with the hope of expanding their potential in the production of original Korean shows.

iQIYI also began to expand its horizons by producing Southeast Asian shows to stream as iQIYI originals for more viewership. In August 2021, iQIYI streamed a Singaporean drama titled The Ferryman: Legends of Nanyang, which was its first Southeast Asian original series starring local actors from Singapore like Lawrence Wong and Qi Yuwu and Taiwanese actress Kate Kinney. The drama is also a remake of the 2014 Chinese drama series, but in a Southeast Asian setting.

In October 2021, iQIYI and Thema went into a partnership to launch their services on Netgem TV in the United Kingdom and Ireland, with iQIYI hoping to distribute Asian content on European media to create a larger global audience.

During the 26th Busan International Film Festival, iQIYI partnered with Philippine broadcaster ABS-CBN to produce Saying Goodbye and Hello, Heart as the first two original series from the country, which aired later that year.

In May 2022, iQIYI Sports announced a streaming rights request for the Italian football competition Serie A. This marks the fifth acquisition since the expansion into the sports market after acquiring streaming rights to other sporting events such as UEFA, AFC. The same month, iQIYI removed all movies of Keanu Reeves after he appeared at a virtual event hosted by Tibet House US due to its linkages with the 14th Dalai Lama.

== Reception ==
In 2019, Taiwan's Institute for National Defense and Security Research reported that iQIYI is used by China's Taiwan Affairs Office to further united front efforts on the island. In response, Taiwan banned the company.

In April 2020, activist investors, including Muddy Waters Research, accused iQIYI of overstating its revenue and subscribers. Short-seller Wolfpack Research also accused the company of inflating revenue numbers. In August 2020, it was announced that the U.S. Securities and Exchange Commission subsequently launched an investigation into iQIYI. Later in early October 2020, iQIYI made a statement that an internal review into the allegations of fraud made by the American short seller Wolfpack Research, "did not uncover any evidence that would substantiate the allegations." The internal review had been conducted by an independent audit committee, which included "a Big 4 accounting firm that is not the Company's auditor."

In June 2020, the Beijing Internet Court sided with a customer who sued the company for breaching the terms and conditions of the 'VIP' subscription. iQIYI had charged additional fees for pre-screens of dramas, although paying customers were promised access at no extra charge.

== See also ==
- List of iQIYI original programming
- List of streaming media services
