= Whispers of Fate =

2025 Chinese television series

- Promotional poster
- Traditional Chinese: 水龍吟
- Simplified Chinese: 水龙吟
- Hanyu Pinyin: Shuǐlóng Yín
- Genre: Xuanhuan; Wuxia
- Based on: "Enduring a Thousand Tribulations"(千劫眉) by Teng Ping (藤萍)
- Written by: Zhuang Xiu; Lin Conghe; Wang Xiaolou; Yan Moyi
- Directed by: Chen Zhoufei; Qian Jingwu
- Starring: Luo Yunxi
- Country of origin: China
- Original language: Mandarin
- No. of seasons: 1
- No. of episodes: 40

Production
- Executive producers: Lin Jun; Ye Fangcang
- Producer: Wang Yirong
- Production location: Hengdian World Studios
- Production companies: ZSTC Media Group, Otters Studio

Original release
- Network: Mango TV, Hunan Television, Migu Video
- Release: October 24 – November 14, 2025

Whispers of Fate (Chinese: 水龍吟; pinyin: Shuǐ Lóng Yín) is a 2025 Chinese television series based on the serialized martial arts novel Enduring a Thousand Tribulations by Teng Ping. It stars Luo Yunxi as Tang Lici, a highly skilled yet morally ambiguous swordsman who is accused of murder, and his martial arts adventures. The series premiered on Mango TV and Migu Video on October 24, followed by a broadcast on Hunan Television on October 30. The series received an international release across more than 110 countries, streaming simultaneously on platforms such as Netflix, WeTV, Rakuten Viki, YouTube and featuring localizations in languages including English, Thai, and Vietnamese.

Whispers of Fate achieved high broadcast and streaming performance, setting a record for Mango TV with 4.9 billion cumulative plays, being Migu Video's highest-rated content ever and topping international charts in multiple regions. Its concert is the third Chinese television drama concert to reach an audience on a scale of ten thousand. A related Whispers of Fate Theme Park, located in Sichuan Province, is mainland China's first immersive film-tourism complex. The park transforms the series' xuanxia universe into a large-scale live-action role-playing experience, allowing visitors to influence narrative outcomes within a technologically enhanced environment featuring AR and VR integrations.

== Synopsis ==
The morally inscrutable Tang Lici is framed by a former friend, and is forced to enter jianghu to clear his name.

During his journey across the lands, his initial detachment softens as he is gradually influenced by the community's profound code of chivalry and courageous spirit. As this transformation occurs, he uncovers a sinister plot: under the manipulation of the House of Pleasure, the entire martial arts community faces extermination.

Tang Lici realizes he must not only shoulder the fate of the world but also confront his true identity and purpose, leading him to finally face his destiny.

== Cast ==
=== Main ===
- Luo Yunxi as Tang Lici (唐俪辞)
  - Tang Lici (唐俪辞): Given the nickname 'Fox Tang' due to his sly and astute nature, Tang Lici was formerly known as Ajibaner·Tangjia (阿吉班尔·唐伽) before entering Zhoudi Tower as a disciple. He is a highly-skilled swordsman who is known for his sound-kill abilities through playing the dizi and the Guqin. He is the owner of the Ship of Ten Thousand Apertures (万窍斋), the center of all wealth in the lands (神州). The discovery of the highly addictive and poisonous 'Bloody Ghost of Nine Hearts Pill' (腥鬼九心丸) in the martial arts community comes to his attention, and he works together with the orthodox sects to find the source and destroy it forever.

=== Supporting ===
- Aero Xiao as Shen Langhun (沈郎魂), a stealth assassin
- Ao Ziyi as Chi Yun (池云), Tang Lici's bodyguard
- Alen Fang as Liu Yan (柳眼), former third disciple brother of Zhoudi Tower and well-versed in the Pipa. Founder of the House of Pleasure (风流店)
- Sebrina Chen as Xifang Tao (Peach Blossom) (西方桃), member of the House of Pleasure (风流店)
- Bao Shangen as Zhong Chunji (钟春髻), member of the Sword Society
- Jelly Lin as Ah-Shei (阿谁)
- Jeremy Tsui as Gui Mudan (Ghost Peony) (鬼牡丹)
- Riley Wang as Fang Pingzhai (方平斋)
- Yang Shize as Puzhu (普珠), a secular disciple
- Xie Binbin as Yu Furen (余负人)
- Jiang Zhenyu as Miss Hong (红姑娘), member of the House of Pleasure
- Bai Shu as Xue Xianzi (雪线子), a carefree martial artist with no loyalties
- Li Jiahao as Gu Xitan (古溪谭)
- Chang Huasen as Wanyu Yuedan (宛郁月旦), leader of the Palace of Fallen Jade (碧落宫)
- Xia Zhiguang as Fu Zhumei, former second disciple brother of Zhoudi Tower and well-versed in the Drum
- Zhang Zhixi as Dragon Lady (龙女)
- Wang Jialin as Bai Nanzhu (白南珠)
- Kudousi Jiang Ainiwaer as Yuchi Hu (尉迟忽)
- Ou Mide as Mahoraga (摩呼罗迦)
- Qi Xiaxia as Gandharva (乾达婆)
- Qiu Xinzhi as Shao Yanping (邵延屏), leader of the Sword Society
- Zhang Junning as Fang Zhou (方周), oldest disciple brother of Zhoudi Tower and well-versed in the Guqin. He takes in the wounded Tang Lici after finding him unconscious.
- Wang Zirui as Cheng Yinpao
- Xiu Qing as Yu Qifeng (余泣凤)
- Cui Peng as Yang Shangqing
- Lu Xingyu as Jiang Qingyu
- Liu Yuhan as Hua Wuyan (花无言) / Cao Wufang (草无芳), member of the House of Pleasure
- Zhang Lei as Tang Weiqian (唐为谦), Tang Lici's adopted father and father-in-law to the Emperor
- Chen Bohao as Sir Tianxuan (天玄先生)
- Du Yuchen as Yu Xuanqing (余玄清)
- Hou Tongjiang as the Abbot of Gold Leaf Temple (金叶寺）
- Li Fei as young Ye Mo (叶摩)
- Li Yizhen as Princess Xiya (希娅公主)
- Bai Haitao as Marquis Hao (郝文侯)
- Zhao Shiyi as Huiniang (慧娘), Shen Langhun's wife
- Ai Mi as Shuiduo Po (水多婆)
- Li Muyan as Bai Suche (白素车)
- Zhong Lei as Jiang Feiyu (江飞羽), Head of Yanmen Sect (雁门)
- Xue Bayi as Feng Chuanxiang (风传香)
- Deng Xiaoci as Jiang Cheng (江城)
- Deng Jinghong as Ji Wuyou (纪无忧)
- Zhong Ming as Jiang Wenbo (蒋文博)
- Wang Yijun as Xiao Qilan (萧奇兰)
- Mu Le'en as Shang Yunqi (商云棋)
- Cheng Tao as Shangguan Fei (上官飞)
- Wang Bowen as Fu Cui (抚翠)
- Qin Xiaoxuan as Bi Lianyi (碧涟漪)
- Yusan·Ababaikeri as Meihua Yishu (梅花易数)
- Jia Zongchao as Kuanglan Wuxing (狂兰无形)
- Wang Baian as Lady Cicada (青蝉娘子)

== Production ==
Whispers of Fate was announced on November 11, 2023, at Mango TV's Commercial Presentation (芒果驷马难追建群大会). The series began filming on December 2, 2023, and finished on April 24, 2024. This series marks the third Otters Studio production with Luo Yunxi in the leading role, after Till The End Of The Moon (2023) and the unaired Immortality. Otters Studio also brings back frequent collaborators Huatian Studio as its world concept team, Huang Wei as costume director and Wang Haiqi as action director.

Filmed over 144 days, the production used over 2,000 crew members, 12 purpose-built soundstages, and 164 outdoor locations. For the series, 847 costumes and 1,222 accessories were specifically designed.

== International Broadcast ==
For its international release, Whispers of Fate was distributed across more than 110 countries and territories, with availability on global streaming platforms such as Netflix, Rakuten Viki, iQiyi International, and WeTV. The show was localized into several languages, including English, Thai, and Vietnamese, for its simultaneous global launch.

== Reception ==
=== Viewership ===
Since its premiere, Whispers of Fate achieved both high broadcast ratings and online streaming numbers. It has dominated both the CSM National Network and CSM-71 Cities ratings, consistently ranking first in its time slot among China's provincial satellite channels. For its release on streaming platforms, the drama becomes Migu Video's highest-rated content ever with a heat index surpassing 15,000. As of its finale, it sets a new platform record for Mango TV with 4.9 billion cumulative plays. It achieved a single-day peak of 100 million views. According to the CVB 2025 domestic TV drama viewership report released by the National Radio and Television Administration, during its broadcast on Hunan TV, Whispers of Fate achieved a local audience rating of 1.601%. The report also confirms the show garnered over 8.2 billion topic reads on Weibo and ranked first in viewership among TV dramas on Mango TV in 2025. Internationally, the series launched simultaneously across 19 platforms in over 60 global markets spanning 110 countries and territories, topping charts including Thailand's Monomax and Vietnam's FTP Play Chinese-language chart. Whispers of Fate was the most watched television show on Monomax in 2025.

=== Impact ===
Less than a month after the finale of Whispers of Fate, its spin-off variety show "Whispers of Fate: Team Bonding in Jianghu" has surpassed 100 million views. As of December 8, 2025, official merchandise sales for Whispers of Fate have exceeded 13.6 million RMB, securing its position as the top-selling annual merchandise champion for a 2025 Chinese television drama. Luo Yunxi alone contributed to 86% of these sales. Audiences are purchasing items primarily "to compensate for the lingering regret over the characters' destinies," with non-traditional fanbase users joining in to consume.

Whispers of Fate has hosted costume exhibitions across multiple locations in mainland China, with the first one held in Guangzhou. For the drama's series concert at the Shanghai Oriental Sports Center, online pre-registrations surpassed 100,000. A total of 14,000 tickets across the first and second rounds sold out within 16 minutes, prompting organizers to add more seats and tickets. The event ultimately attracted nearly 20,000 attendees, making it the third Chinese television drama series concert to reach a ten-thousand-scale audience, following The Untamed and Word of Honor. The show is included as the top 5 CDrama with global appeal through CCTV's CPOP Program.

=== Accolades ===
Year	Award	Category	Nominees	Result	Ref.
2025	Weibo TV and Internet Video Summit	Outstanding Actor of the Year	Luo Yunxi	Won	
2025	2025 Datawin Awards	Costume Drama Popularity Award	—N/a	Won	

== Original soundtrack ==
No.	Title	Lyrics	Music	Singer	Length
1.	"No Spring Breeze, No You (不沐春风不遇你)" (Theme song)	Xu Chunyu	Yu Heng	Jane Zhang, Liu Yuning	4:23
2.	"Song of the Black Dragon (骊龙吟)" (Opening theme song)	Zhao Se, Hu Haitao	Yang Kuo, Zhao Se, Saji	Lars Huang	2:50
3.	"Always (一往)" (Tang Lici theme song)	Luo Yunxi	Wang Xinghe	Luo Yunxi	4:19
4.	"Ballad to the Breeze (临风吟)"	Xu Chunyu	Yu Heng	Ashin	4:46
5.	"From Now On (从此以后)"	Teng, Yan Yidan	Yan Yidan	Faye	4:10
6.	"Blazing Times with You(与你发烫的时光)"	Yan Yidan	Li Ruochen	Yan Yidan	3:42
7.	"Shattered Sounds of Spring (春声碎)"	Yan Yidan, Teng	Wang Zihe Ray, Yan Yidan	Daichin Tana	4:37
8.	"Where (于何处)"	Teng	Yan Yidan	Zhe Lai	3:48
9.	"Ballad of Yearning Water(念水谣)"	Zhao Se	Zhao Se	Wu Yiran	4:41
10.	"With You (与你)"	uyyan, Shen Mingli	uyyan	Du Zhiwen Baby-J	4:03
11.	"With You (与你)"	uyyan, Shen Mingli	uyyan	Saji	4:03
