= Key to the Phoenix Heart =

- Promotional poster
- Simplified Chinese: 雀骨
- Hanyu Pinyin: Què gǔ
- Genre: Romance
- Written by: Wu Mengzhang
- Directed by: Gao Yijun
- Starring: Hou Minghao; Ai Mi
- Country of origin: China
- Original language: Mandarin
- No. of episodes: 28

Production
- Running time: 45 minutes

Original release
- Network: iQIYI
- Release: 11 June – 22 July 2026

Key to the Phoenix Heart (Chinese: 雀骨; pinyin: Què gǔ) is a 2026 Chinese television series starring Hou Minghao and Ai Mi. Directed by Gao Yijun and written by Wu Mengzhang. It premiered on iQIYI on 11 June 2026.

== Synopsis ==
Xiao Wuyi (Hou Minghao), a ruthless general, and Xie Jiayu (Ai Mi), the Grand Tutor's daughter, enter a forced contractual marriage. They find themselves bonding through life-and-death schemes and a conspiracy between nations that threatens the imperial court.

== Casts ==
=== Main ===
- Hou Minghao as Xiao Wuyi
- Ai Mi as Xie Jiayu

=== Supporting ===
- Riley Wang as Li Mao
- Peter Ho as Xie Huaigui
- Ma Qiuyuan as Li Lejun
- Tao Xinran as Empress Dowager He
