= Love Is Sweet =

Chinese 2020 web television series

- Also known as: Half Honey, Half Hurt
- Traditional Chinese: 半是蜜糖半是傷
- Simplified Chinese: 半是蜜糖半是伤
- Hanyu Pinyin: Bàn shì mì táng bàn shì shāng
- Genre: Romantic comedy
- Screenplay by: Wang Wentong Liu Jinfei; Liu Shiba; Ding Yanqing
- Directed by: Yu Zhongzhong; Wu Jianxin
- Starring: Luo Yunxi; Bai Lu
- Country of origin: China
- Original language: Mandarin
- No. of episodes: 36

Production
- Producers: Gong Yu; Wang Jingjing
- Running time: 45 minutes
- Production company: iQIYI

Original release
- Network: iQIYI
- Release: September 27, 2020

Love is Sweet (Chinese: 半是蜜糖半是伤; pinyin: Bàn shì mì táng bàn shì shāng, lit. 'Equality with Sweet and Pain') is a 2020 Chinese television drama loosely adapted from the novel of the same name by Qizi. Starring Luo Yunxi and Bai Lu as lead actors, the series premiered on iQIYI on September 27, 2020.

== Plot ==
With her double master's degree in Economics and Psychology, Jiang Jun applies for a job at the investment bank MH. Upon arriving at the company, she discovers that Yuan Shuai, her childhood bully, is now MH's executive director. Yuan Shuai, catching a glimpse of Jiang Jun, goes out of his way to stop her from getting a job at MH. However, with the help of MH executive Lin Taimo, Jiang Jun successfully lands a role at the bank.

Over the course of series, Jiang Jun and Yuan Shuai grow closer. It is revealed that, unbeknownst to Jiang Jun, Yuan Shuai has been in love with her for ten years. He has always 'bullied' her to try and toughen her up (Jiang Jun suffers from an unfortunate tear allergy). When he confesses, Jiang Jun reciprocates his feelings, and they begin dating. When Lin Taimo is appointed MH's managing director, he sets Yuan Shuai up in a bribery scheme and successfully kicks him out of MH, replacing him with Du Lei, Yuan Shuai's longtime rival. With Linda and Du Lei's help, Yuan Shuai secretly investigates the acquisition of the rice noodle company of Jiang Jun's deceased father and his associated death, whose culprits turn out to be Lin Taimo and Linda. Yuan Shuai's cousin Li Xiaochuan and Jiang Jun's best friend Xu Li also start a relationship after they work together on Li Xiaochuan's start-up.

Two years later, Jiang Jun is promoted to be the vice president of the investment bank department, while Yuan Shuai is the managing director of GE's corresponding department. Du Lei, now MH's investment bank department managing director, confesses his feelings to Jiang Jun, only to face rejection. Jiang Jun investigates Du Lei's corruption act because it causes two of her colleagues to be fired by Du Lei. Yuan Shuai finally successfully proposes after several failed attempts, to which Jiang Jun accepts. Later, it is shown she is pregnant with their first child.

== Cast ==
- Luo Yunxi as Yuan Shuai

Yuan Shuai is a 27-year-old hard-working MH executive director who has been secretly in love with Jiang Jun for ten years, but always too afraid to confess. He has always played jokes on since they were young to try to help Jiang Jun cultivate a tougher personality and reduce her tear allergy, but is misunderstood as a bully.

- Bai Lu as Jiang Jun

The 25-year-old MH securities analyst, later vice president, Jiang Jun is soft-spoken on the outside but strong on the inside. She is allergic to tears. She has known Yuan Shuai since kindergarten and has always seen him as a bully.

- Gao Hanyu as Du Lei

The 30-year-old GE executive director, Du Lei is Yuan Shuai's rival who frequently loses to the former. He hides a secret past, is willing to do anything to achieve his goals, and rarely ever reveals his true feelings to anybody.

- Xiao Yan as Xu Li

Xu Li is the 25-year-old convenience store worker who is Jiang Jun's best friend. She has a strong sense of justice, prioritizes love above everything else, and has no career ambitions. Xu Li has a crush on Li Xiaochuan and does everything she can to help him reach his dreams.

- Riley Wang as Li Xiaochuan

Xiaochuan is the 25-year-old app developer who is Yuan Shuai's younger cousin. He is a serious and hardworking IT genius dedicated to his startup, West World. Li Xiaochuan is often oblivious when it comes to other people's feelings.

- Zhao Yuanyuan as Qiao Na

Qiao Na is the vice president of MH who pursues perfection and extremely demanding of her subordinates. She likes Yuan Shuai but never forces him to reciprocate her feelings.

- An Weiling as Linda

One of the founding members of MH, Linda eventually left and joined GE as an executive director. She is Du Lei's adoptive sister, and prioritizes her own interests above everything else.

- Guan Zijing as Su Chang

Su Chang is Yuan Shuai's friend and wingman who helps him collect information using his vast network.

== Music ==
The Love is Sweet original soundtrack was released on September 27, 2020.

No.	Title	Performer(s)	Length
1.	"A Love Song For You" (Score)	Wang Rui	3:11
2.	"Blue Bird" (Score)	Ding Dang	3:33
3.	"Come Back My Love" (Score)	An Weiling	3:51
4.	"Diamond Heart" (Score)	By2	4:21
5.	"Miracle"	Gao Hanyu	3:36
6.	"Say Yes" (Score)	Xu Ziyin	3:54
7.	"Sometimes" (Score)	Riley Wang	4:09
8.	"Things I Do For Love" (Score)	Sunnee	4:01
9.	"Love Is" (Score)	Lian Huaiwei, Peng Ya Qi	3:23

== Release ==
Love is Sweet premiered exclusively on iQIYI on September 27, 2020 with multilanguage subtitles. It premiered in Japan on March 28, 2022, via Tokyo Broadcasting System Television.

== Reception ==
=== Audience viewership ===
As of May 2026, Love is Sweet has over 198,200 ratings on iQIYI, with an average rating of 9.5 out of 10 stars. On Douban, the series has over 140,700 ratings, with an average rating of 6.7 out of 10 stars.

=== Critical response ===
Wang Peng from Global Times praised the series, highlighting the engaging, fast-paced plot and the chemistry between leads Luo Yunxi and Bai Lu. They also praised the romance itself, writing that, "unlike the straightforward, sweet romance formula common in previous youth dramas, Love is Sweet presents the love-hate entanglements among urban professionals from a unique 'unrequited love' perspective."

NetEase Entertainment's review praised the actors, stating that, "Luo Yunxi's portrayal of Yuan Shuai is natural and expressive, resonating with the audience and evoking memories of their own unrequited love experiences."
