= The Chronicles of Town Called Jian =

- Also known as: Cocoon Town Romance; Small Town Adventures
- Genre: Mystery; Period drama
- Based on: Tarot Goddess Sleuths by Zhang Ranran
- Written by: Qing Mei; Zhang Yongming
- Directed by: Zeng Nianping; Chang Xiaoyang
- Starring: Victoria Song; Jiang Jinfu; Yang Yang; Zhang Zhixi
- Country of origin: China
- Original language: Mandarin
- No. of seasons: 1
- No. of episodes: 40

Production
- Executive producer: Li Shaohong
- Producer: Li Shaohong
- Production location: Wujiang District, Suzhou
- Running time: 45 mins
- Production company: Rosat Entertainment

Original release
- Network: Mango TV
- Release: 1 January – 13 February 2018

The Chronicles of Town Called Jian (Chinese: 茧镇奇缘) is a 2018 Chinese television series based on the novel Tarot Goddess Sleuths (Chinese: 塔罗女神探之茧镇奇案) by Zhang Ranran. The series was produced by Li Shaohong and directed by Zeng Nianping. It stars Victoria Song, Jiang Jinfu, Yang Yang and Zhang Zhixi.

The series began filming on December 13, 2013, and was concluded on March 6, 2014. The show first aired on January 1, 2018 via Mango TV.

== Synopsis ==
Set during the Republican era, the story tells of Du Chunxiao; a smart young girl who uses her strange but unique ability to deduct clues and solve mysteries through the use of tarot cards. However, one day she decides to return to Jiangnan with her friend Huang Mengqing. As the Huang family accepts Chun Xiao as one of their own, Mr. Huang proposes the idea of marriage between his son Mo Ru, and Chun Xiao. Though she is not particularly attracted to Mo Ru, she continues to live with the Huang's until strange things begin to occur that endanger her life. It is during those difficult times, that she notices Huang Muyun, the youngest son of the Huang's. As the two discover their feelings for each other, secrets regarding Chun Xiao's true identity, as well as the darker nature of Mr. Huang's past deeds are unraveled.

== Cast ==
=== Main ===
Actor	Character	Introduction
Victoria Song	Du Chunxiao	Meng Qing's study companion and close friend since young. An innocent, optimistic and determined girl. She uses her tarot cards to unveil the mysteries of the Huang manor, as well the secrets of her own family background.
Jiang Jinfu	Huang Muyun	Second master of Huang manor, son of the third wife. He helps Chunxiao solve cases and along the way, falls in love with her. He was revealed to be the son of Li Changchen later.
Yang Yang	Huang Moru	First master of the Huang manor, son of the second wife. A gentleman who is cowardly.
Zhang Zhixi	Huang Mengqing	First mistress of the Huang manor, daughter of the first wife. A dignified and elegant lady. She has a crush on her brother, Moru. She was later discovered to bear a shocking birth secret.

=== Supporting ===
==== Huang Manor ====
Actor	Character	Introduction
Jiang Tong	Huang Tianming	Master of the Huang household. He hides his cunning and evil nature behind a gentle and warm facade.
Gao Ying	Zhuo Yao	Huang Tianming's first wife, Mengqing's birth mother. She was revealed later to be the wife of Xue Zuichi.
Cao Yanyan	Su Xiaomei	Huang Tianming's second wife, Moru's birth mother.
Zhou Yi	Zhang Yanping	Huang Tianming's third wife, Muyun's birth mother. She is later discovered to be involved in an extramarital affair with Li Changdeng, her former senior at the opera troupe.
Yang Rui	Housekeeper Zhao	Housekeeper of Huang manor. He assists Huang Tianming in covering up his crimes.
Xiao Shuli	Mother Zhou	Zhuo Yao's long-time personal maid. She was killed by Huang Tianming, but her death was covered up as a robbery. She was later revealed to be Du Chunxiao's nanny in her childhood.
Tang Mengjia	Xue'er	A maid who was in love with Moru and served Zhuo Yao. She was later poisoned to death.
Wu Qianyu	Tao Zhi	A maid who served Zhuo Yao, but was later poisoned to death.
Ding Liuhe	Lan Xiang	A maid who serves Su Xiaomei.
Zhao Yuhan	Xiao Cui	A maid who serves Zhang Yanping.

==== Others ====
Actor	Character	Introduction
Nan Sheng	Bai Zifeng	A physician with a prickly personality. She has a one-sided love for Muyun. Her father was later revealed to be killed by Huang Tianming, thus making her an orphan.
Mark Cheung Lui	Li Changchen	Head detective of the town, who is often bribed by Huang Tianming to cover up for his crimes. He is revealed to be involved in an extramarital affair with Zhang Yanping, and later revealed to be the father of Huang Muyun.
Li Xiliang	Xia Bing	A rookie detective who is earnest in solving cases. He later befriends Chunxiao and assists her in uncovering Huan Tianming's evil deeds.
Ren Wei	Boss Yu	Boss of a noodle shop. He is later revealed to be Xue Zuichi, Huang Tianming's former business partner. Both his wife (Zhuo Yao) and daughter (Meng Qing) were forcibly taken away from him by Huang Tianming.
Gui Lili	Lady Qin	Xue'er's mother. She has a one-sided love for Huang Moru, whom she shared an appreciation of paintings with.
Leng Haiming	Du Baotang	Du Chunxiao's father, Huang Tianming's former business partner.

== Soundtrack ==
No.	Title	Lyrics	Music	Singers	Length
1.	"The Most Beautiful Anticipation (最美的期待)" (Theme song)	NZBZ	NZBZ	Bibi Zhou
