= Thin Ice (2023 TV series) =

- 薄冰
- Genre: espionage, suspense
- Based on: Thin Ice by Chen Dong Qiang Qiang
- Written by: Hai Fei
- Directed by: Jin Chen
- Starring: Peng Guanying; Chen Yuqi
- Country of origin: China
- Original language: Mandarin
- No. of episodes: 40

Production
- Production location: China
- Running time: 45 minutes

Original release
- Network: Hunan TV
- Release: April 5 – May 3, 2023

Related
- Sparrow

Thin Ice is a Chinese suspense TV series directed by Jin Chen. Its background is set in the Republic of China from 1944 to 1949, featuring an espionage story in Second Sino-Japanese War and Chinese Communist Revolution. It stars Peng Guanying and Chen Yuqi. The series aired on Hunan TV from April 5 to May 3, 2023.

== Plot ==
During the Second Sino-Japanese War, Japan sent spies to Shanghai, searching for information about uranium mines in China. Chen Qian, an agent from the Bureau of Investigation and Statistics, secretly replaced one of the dead Japanese spy and lurked into the Japanese spy agency. Chen Qian united with patriots from all political standpoints, including Nationalists, Communists, and Nanjing puppet regime. Eventually, He regained the uranium mine sample and cracked the conspiracy of Japanese. After the end of the World War II, Nationalists and Communists went into the civil war. Chen Qian, who had secretly joined the Communists before, received a new mission to protect the infrastructures in Chongqing from the scorched-earth destruction of the Nationalists...

== Cast ==
- Peng Guanying as Chen Qian.

An agent serving for the Bureau of Investigation and Statistics (NBIS), with codename Lv Bu. He secretly joined the Communist side during the uranium-mine mission.

- Chen Yuqi as Yu Chunyang.

An agent serving for the Chinese Communist Party (CCP), with birth name Wang Kaiya, codename cuckoo. She is the lover of Chen Qian.

- Fu Dalong as Ida Yujiro.

The header of Japanese spy agency at Shanghai.

- Chen Xiaoyun as Wu Ruonan.

An agent serving for the NBIS. She fell in unrequited love with Chen Qian. Her mother is an undercovered CCP agent lurking in the Japanese spy agency.

- Gao Hanyu as Xie Dongtian.

An agent serving for the NBIS. He is eager to be promoted, even putting his colleagues into danger. He fell in unrequited love with Wu Ruonan.

- Dong Jie as Gu Manli.

A doctor serving for Nanjing puppet regime. She is actually an agent serving for the CCP, with codename Flying Sky.

== Production ==
In September 2020, the original novel was published and the preparation for TV-series adaptation started at the same time. The series is written by Hai Fei and directed by Jin Chen, which is the duo's second collaboration since the 2016 TV series Sparrow.

The principal photography started on March 23, 2022, at Hengdian World Studios. The filming wrapped up on June 24, 2022. In December 2022, it received the release license from National Radio and Television Administration.
