= Chen Yao (actress) =

Chinese actress (born 1994)

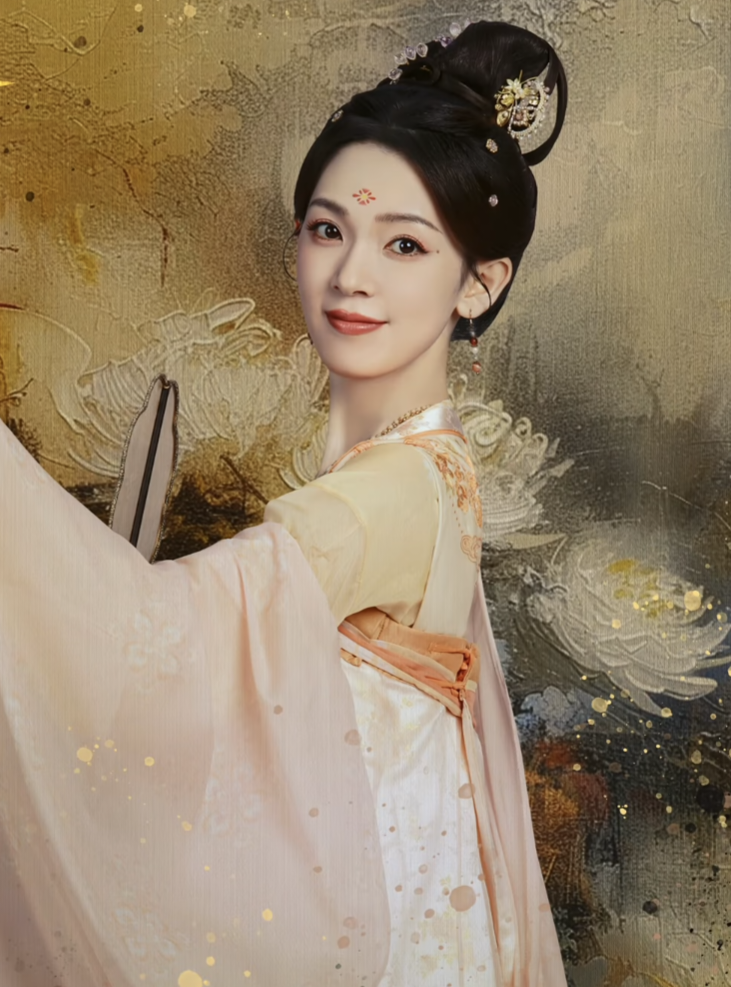
- Chen for Follow Your Heart (2024)
- Born: 31 October 1994 (age 31); Panzhihua, Sichuan, China
- Other name: Sebrina Chen
- Education: Beijing Film Academy
- Occupation: Actress
- Years active: 2014–present
- Agent(s): Tangren Media (2014–2022); Zhongshi Tongcheng (2022–present)

Chen Yao (Chinese: 陈瑶; born 31 October 1994) is a Chinese actress. She is known for her role as Yue Qiluo in Wu Xin: The Monster Killer (2015) and her role as Sang Tian in My Unicorn Girl (2020).

== Early life ==
Chen Yao was born in Panzhihua, Sichuan, China. Chen graduated from the Beijing Film Academy in 2017.

== Career ==
Chen made her acting debut in the youth sports drama Go! Goal! Fighting!, which premiered in 2016.

In 2015, Chen rose to fame for her role as Yue Qiluo, the main antagonist in the hit fantasy web series Wu Xin: The Monster Killer. Chen was awarded the Best Supporting Actress at the Golden Guduo Media Awards for her breakout performance.

In 2016, Chen was part of an ensemble cast for the drama Legend of Nine Tails Fox, in which she played a fox demon. The drama also co-starred Zhang Ruoyun and Qiao Xin. The same year, Chen starred in her first leading role in So Young, based on the youth romance novel of the same name by Xin Yiwu. The following year, she reprised her role as Yue Qiluo in the second season of Wu Xin: The Monster Killer and simultaneously portrayed a male character in the series.

In 2018, Chen starred in the fantasy historical drama Beauties in the Closet, followed by modern youth drama Meet in Youth, Love in Foods with Chen Xiang. The same year, she won the Rising Star Award at the Sina Best Taste 2017 Award Ceremony. Chen then starred in the action drama Age of Legends, in which she portrayed a young female CEO.

In 2020, the third installment of Wu Xin: The Monster Killer premiered. Chen portrayed a pair of twin siblings who had mysterious connections with Yue Qiluo. The same year, she starred in the youth sports drama My Unicorn Girl, and historical romance mystery drama Maiden Holmes. Her debut film, First Love was also released.

== Filmography ==
=== Film ===
Year	English title	Chinese title	Role	Notes	Ref.
2014	Sadness Cuisine	伤心料理	First customer	Short film	
2020	First Love	初恋教我的18件事	Tian Xiaole	Short film	
2022	Fierce Cop	烈探	Chin Maung-su		

=== Television series ===
Year	English title	Chinese title	Role	Network	Ref.
2015	Wu Xin: The Monster Killer	无心法师	Yue Qiluo	Sohu TV	
2016	Legend of Nine Tails Fox	青丘狐传说	Hua Yue	Hunan TV	
2016	Go! Goal! Fighting!	旋风十一人	Tang Qiqi	Dragon TV	
2016	So Young	致青春	Zheng Wei	Dragon TV	
2017	Wu Xin: The Monster Killer II	无心法师 II	Yue Qiluo	Sohu TV, Tencent Video	
2017	Wu Xin: The Monster Killer II	无心法师 II	Xiao Ding Mao	Sohu TV, Tencent Video	
2018	Beauties in the Closet	柜中美人	Hu Feiluan	Youku	
2018	Meet in Youth, Love in Foods	像我们一样年轻	Yang Xiaorou	Hunan TV	
2018	Age of Legends	橙红年代	Li Wan	Dragon TV, Zhejiang TV	
2020	Wu Xin: The Monster Killer III	无心法师 III	Liu Qingluan	iQIYI, Tencent Video, Youku	
2020	Wu Xin: The Monster Killer III	无心法师 III	Liu Xuanhu	iQIYI, Tencent Video, Youku	
2020	My Unicorn Girl	穿盔甲的少女	Sang Tian	iQIYI	
2020	Maiden Holmes	少女大人	Su Ci	Tencent Video	
2021	The Player	指尖少年	Gu Ling	Mango TV	
2021	The Player	指尖少年	Darcy	Mango TV	
2023	Love Is Full of Jiudaowan	情满九道弯	Shi Xiaona	CCTV-8	
2023	Best Enemy	宿命之敌	Shen Qiuping / Tian Liu	iQIYI	
2023	The Future Handbook	明日生存指南	Amy	Bilibili	
2023	The Furthest Distance	最遥远的距离	Mi Bai / Mi Su	Tencent Video	
2024	Fox Spirit Matchmaker: Red-Moon Pact	狐妖小红娘月红篇	Lu Jianwen	iQIYI	
2024	The Tale of Rose	玫瑰的故事	Bai Xiaohe	CCTV-8, Tencent Video	
2024	Follow Your Heart	颜心记	Jiang Suoluo / Princess Yuejiang	iQIYI	
2025	A Better Life	蛮好的人生	Wu Ya	Youku	
2025	Echoes of the Self	照镜辞	Zhou Ruoxi / Fu Wei	Bilibili	
2025	Whispers of Fate	水龙吟	Xi Fangtao	Hunan TV, Mango TV	
2025	The Vendetta of An	长安二十四计	Zhao Lu	CCTV-8, Youku	
2026	The Mystic Nine II	九门	Huo Xiangu	Youku	
TBA	Immortality	皓衣行	Shi Mingjing	Tencent Video	
TBA	Love Under the Floral Rain	半城花雨伴君离	Hua Zhuyu	Youku	
TBA	Liao Zhai	聊斋	Su Qiu	Tencent Video	
TBA	Extreme Punishment Suit	心诉	Ye Lingfeng	iQIYI	
TBA	Detective Time: The Prime of Life	刑警时刻1风华正茂	Yu Zhiqiao	Tencent Video	

=== Variety show ===
Year	English title	Chinese title	Role	Network	Ref.
2017	Chi Guang Quan Yu Zhou	吃光全宇宙	Host	iQIYI	
2019	Everybody Stand By	演员请就位	Contestant	Tencent	

== Awards and nominations ==
Year	Award	Category	Nominated work	Results	Ref.
2015	Star Show Award Ceremony	Trend Newcomer	—N/a	Won	
2016	1st Golden Bud - The Third Network Film And Television Festival	Best Supporting Actress	Wu Xin: The Monster Killer	Won	
2017	4th The Actors of China	Green Group Actress Award	—N/a	Nominated	
2017	Sina Best Taste 2017 Award Ceremony	New Rising Star of the Year	—N/a	Won	
2019	3rd Golden Bud - The Third Network Film And Television Festival	Most Capable Actress	—N/a	Won	
2019	Sina Fashion Awards	Most Promising Artist of the Year	—N/a	Won	
