= Zhang Zhixi =

Chinese actress

- Born: 7 October 1987 (age 38); Wen County, Gansu, China
- Other name: Jessie Zhang
- Education: Southwest Minzu University; Beijing Film Academy
- Occupation: Actress
- Years active: 2011–present
- Agent(s): H&R Century Pictures

Chinese name
- Chinese: 张芷溪
Transcriptions

Zhang Zhixi (Chinese: 张芷溪; born 7 October 1987) is a Chinese actress. She is known for her role as Lady Zhen in the historical drama The Advisor's Alliance.

== Career ==
In 2012, Zhang made her acting debut in the war television series Glory Lane. The same year she played a supporting role in the historical comedy television series The Legend of Crazy Monk 3 and became known for her role as Chou Tianhe.

In 2013, Zhang starred in the historical television series The Patriot Yue Fei, portraying Yue Fei's daughter Yue Anniang.

In 2014, Zhang starred in the fantasy historical drama Cosmetology High. In 2015, Zhang starred in the period romance drama The Cage of Love.

In 2016, Zhang starred in the wuxia drama The Three Heroes and Five Gallants, portraying Jin Yalan. The same year, she starred in the historical romance drama Chronicle of Life.

In 2017, Zhang starred in the historical drama The Advisors Alliance, portraying Lady Zhen. Her portrayal of the character received positive reviews, and Zhang experienced a rise in popularity.

In 2018, Zhang starred as the leading role in the historical mystery drama My Naughty Classmates as a tarot fortune-teller. The same year she was cast in the historical drama The Imperial Age, playing the role of Mongolian princess Bayalun.

In 2019, Zhang starred in the period espionage drama Spy Hunter, portraying a secret agent. She also co-starred in the fantasy romance drama Love and Destiny. The same year she was announced as the female lead and screenwriter of historical romance drama Bright as the Moon.

== Filmography ==
=== Film ===
Year	English title	Chinese title	Role	Notes
2023	Painted Heart: Twin Tribulations	画心之双生劫	Yao'er	

=== Television series ===
Year	English title	Chinese title	Role	Notes
2012	The Legend of Crazy Monk 3	活佛济公3	Chou Tian'e	
2012	Glory Land	光荣大地	Shi Cao	
2013	The Patriot Yue Fei	精忠岳飞	Yue Anniang	
2014	Cosmetology High	美人制造	Jin Yu	Cameo (Ep. 7–11)
2015	Monthly Payment	月供	Su Xiaoya	
2015	The Cage of Love	抓住彩虹的男人	Fang Feifei	
2016	Chronicle of Life	寂寞空庭春欲晚	Hua Zhu	
2016	The Three Heroes and Five Gallants	五鼠闹东京	Jin Yalan	
2017	The Advisors Alliance	大军师司马懿之军师联盟	Zhen Fu	
2017	Justice Bao	包青天	Gongsun Xiu / Princess Zhao	
2017	Hot Hearts Black Earth	黑土热血	Su Sha	
2018	The Chronicles of Town Called Jian	茧镇奇缘	Huang Mengqing	
2018	My Naughty Classmates	热血书院	Cui Jialuo	
2019	Spy Hunter	天衣无缝	Fang Yifan	
2019	Love and Destiny	三生三世宸汐缘	Qing Yao	
2020	Love of a Forgotten Century	万水千山风雨情	Gao Lingyun / Gao Lingyin	
2021	Bright as the Moon	皎若云间月	Yun Qianyue	also screenwriter
2021	Song of Youth	玉楼春	Empress	Cameo
2022	Royal Feast	尚食	Hu Shanwei	
2022	The Imperial Age	江山纪	Bo Yalun	
2022	Immortal Samsara	沉香如屑·沉香重华	Ran Qing	Part 1–2
2023	The Journey of Chongzi	重紫	Shui Ji	
2023	Till The End Of The Moon	长月烬明	Chu Huang	
2023	Tiger and Crane	虎鹤妖师录	Bai Hu	
2023	A Journey to Love	一念关山	Jia Ling	
2025	Legend of The Female General	锦月如歌	Mu Hongjin	
TBA	Candle in the Tomb	鬼吹灯	Shirley Yang	
TBA	Shui Long Yin	水龙吟		Cameo

== Discography ==
Year	Award	Category	Nominated work	Result	Notes
2018	Youku Young Choice Awards	Most Promising Newcomer	The Advisors Alliance	Won	
2019	Film and TV Role Model 2019 Ranking	Most Popular Supporting Actress	Love and Destiny	Won	
