= Chen Yuqi =

Chinese actress (born 1992)

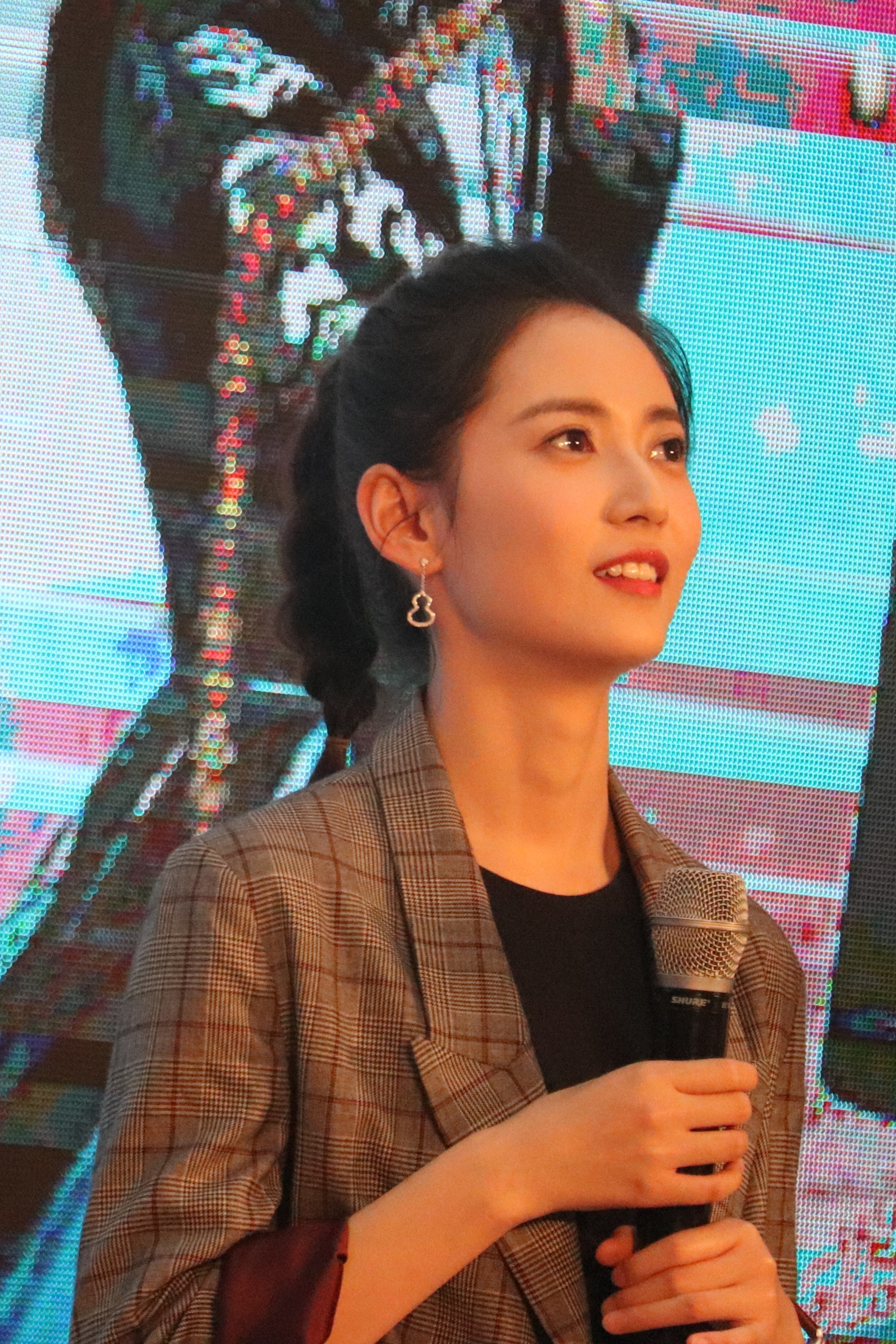
- Chen at the Ashes of Love event, August 2018
- Born: Chen Qian; 29 July 1992 (age 34); Chengdu, Sichuan
- Other name: Yukee Chen
- Education: Jincheng College of Sichuan University
- Occupation: Actress
- Years active: 2015–present
- Agent(s): Tiffany Tang Studio (2015–2023); Chen Yuqi Studio (2023–present)

Chinese name
- Simplified Chinese: 陈钰琪
- Traditional Chinese: 陳鈺琪
Transcriptions
Standard Mandarin
- Hanyu Pinyin: Chén Yùqí

Birth name
- Simplified Chinese: 陈倩
- Traditional Chinese: 陳倩
Transcriptions
Standard Mandarin
- Hanyu Pinyin: Chén Qiàn

Chen Yuqi (Chinese: 陈钰琪, born 29 July 1992), also known as Yukee Chen, is a Chinese actress. She is known for her lead role as Zhao Min in Heavenly Sword and Dragon Slaying Sabre.

== Early life and education ==
Chen Yuqi was born Chen Qian (Chinese: 陈倩) on 29 July 1992 in Chengdu. She studied performing arts at the Jincheng College of Sichuan University. After her graduation, Chen worked as an extra in Hengdian World Studios.

== Career ==
=== 2015–2018: Beginnings ===
In 2015, while working as an extra on the set of movie A Chinese Odyssey Part Three, Chen was spotted by actress Tiffany Tang and subsequently became one of the first batch of actors signed onto Tang's studio.

In 2016, Chen gained recognition for her role as a sassy and adorable princess in the historical drama The Princess Weiyoung, produced by Tiffany Tang's studio. For her performance, she won the Newcomer award at the China Television Drama Quality Ceremony. The same year, she starred in the wuxia web film Man Hunter playing one of the lead roles.

In 2017, Chen was cast in her first leading role in the fantasy web drama Private Shushan Gakuen alongside Wang Yibo. She then starred in the campus drama Fresh Teachers, playing a supporting role as one of the students.

In 2018, Chen starred in the hit fantasy romance drama Ashes of Love, portraying a powerful demon princess.

=== 2019: Rising popularity ===
In 2019, Chen starred as the female lead in the 2019 wuxia drama Heavenly Sword and Dragon Slaying Sabre based on the novel of the same name by Jin Yong. Her role as the beloved character of Zhao Min earned her rave reviews from critics and further bolstered her acting career.

=== 2020–present: Broaden work types ===
Since 2020, Chen has been starring in several high-profile costume dramas, including And the Winner Is Love, Mirror: A Tale of Twin Cities, and Unchained Love. Apart from costume dramas, she also explored a variety of other drama types, such as the time-travel drama See You Again, the comedy drama Never Give Up, and the espionage drama Thin Ice.

In 2023, Chen starred as the female lead in the wuxia film Sakra, alongside martial art star Donnie Yen. This is her second time starring in adaptations of works by Jin Yong. Chen also made her reality-show debut in the same year.

== Filmography ==
=== Film ===
Year	English title	Chinese title	Role	Notes/Ref.
2012	Hold Our Love	Hold住我们的爱情	Fan Baobei	Short film
2014	Love Montage	被错过的那些年	Dong Jiani	Short film
2016	A Chinese Odyssey Part Three	大话西游3	Niu Xiangxiang's subordinate	Bit part
2016	Man Hunter	侠捕之夺命红莲	Yu Jia	
2023	Sakra	天龙八部之乔峰传	Azhu	

=== Television series ===
Year	English title	Chinese title	Role	Network	Notes/Ref.
2015	Tian Tai Meng Zhu	天台萌主	Fu Yanyue	Tudou	
2015	Destined to Love You	偏偏喜歡你	Shen family's maid	Hunan TV	Extra, Episode 2, 4
2015	With or Without You	東坡家事	Li Ai	TVB	Extra, Episode 11, 14
2016	The Princess Weiyoung	锦绣未央	Tuoba Di	Beijing TV, Dragon TV	
2017	Fresh Teachers	鲜肉老师	Chen Lin	Youku	
2018	Ashes of Love	香蜜沉沉烬如霜	Liu Ying	Jiangsu TV	
2018	The Legend of Doctor Huangfu	皇甫神医	Maid	iQiyi	Extra
2019	Heavenly Sword and Dragon Slaying Sabre	倚天屠龙记	Zhao Min	Tencent	
2020	The Love Lasts Two Minds	两世欢	Feng Mianwan / Yuan Qingli	iQiyi	
2020	And the Winner Is Love	月上重火	Chong Xuezhi	iQiyi, Tencent, Youku	
2021	Mystery of Antiques 3	古董局中局3：掠宝清单	Hai Lanzhu	Tencent	
2022	Mirror: A Tale of Twin Cities	镜·双城	Bai Ying/Bai Wei	Tencent, Youku	
2022	Memory of Encaustic Tile	昔有琉璃瓦	Shao Xue	Youku	
2022	See You Again	超时空罗曼史	Jin Ayin	iQiyi	
2022	Song Of The Moon	月歌行	Ling Xueyang	iQiyi	Cameo
2022	Unchained Love	浮图缘	Bu Yinlou	iQiyi	
2023	Never Give Up	今日宜加油	Fan Sisi	iQiyi	
2023	Thin Ice	薄冰	Yu Chunyang	Hunan TV	
TBA	Private Shushan Gakuen	私立蜀山学园	Xing Hui		
TBA		相亲，站住别跑	Wu Yingzhen		
TBA		狐妖小红娘竹业篇	Du Niangzi		Cameo
TBA		长风破浪终有时	Tian Xiaowan		

== Awards and nominations ==
Year	Event	Category	Nominated work	Result	Ref.
2017	2nd China Television Drama Quality Ceremony	Newcomer Award	The Princess Weiyoung	Won	
2017	InStyle iLady Icon Awards	New Generation Female Artist of the Year	—N/a	Won	
2019	6th The Actors of China Awards	Best Actress (Web series)	Heavenly Sword and Dragon Slaying Sabre	Won	
2019	Golden Bud - The Fourth Network Film And Television Festival	Best Actress	Heavenly Sword and Dragon Slaying Sabre	Nominated	
2019	Golden Bud - The Fourth Network Film And Television Festival	Breakthrough Actress of the Year	Heavenly Sword and Dragon Slaying Sabre	Won	
2019	Tencent Video All Star Awards	Breakthrough Actor	Heavenly Sword and Dragon Slaying Sabre	Won	
