= Gao Hanyu =

Chinese actor and singer

- Born: Gao Yu (高宇); February 6, 1989 (age 37); Taizhou, Zhejiang, China
- Other name: Kido
- Occupations: Actor, singer
- Years active: 2007–present

Chinese name
- Chinese: 高瀚宇
Transcriptions

Gao Hanyu (Chinese: 高瀚宇; born 6 February 1989), also known as Kido, is a Chinese actor and singer.

== Career ==
In 2007, Gao participated in Dragon TV's singing competition Wo Xing Wo Xiu and emerged top ten in the finals. In 2008, he participated in Zhejiang TV's program Jue Dui Chang Xiang. In October 2008, he debuted as member of the Chinese boy group HIT-5.

In 2011, Gao made his acting debut in the television series Flight Attendant Diary.

In 2016, Gao starred in the science fiction web film series Alien and its sequel.

In 2017, Gao gained recognition for his performance in the fantasy action drama Fighter of the Destiny. He won the New Actor award at the China Film Fashion Influence Awards.

In 2018, Gao's popularity further increased with his performance in the crime mystery drama S.C.I. Mystery. He received the Capable Actor of the Year award at the Golden Bud - The Third Network Film and Television Festival, and the Rising Actor award at the Silk Road Cohesion Awards. The same year, he starred in the fantasy adventure drama Legend of Fuyao. He also played the leading role in the romance drama Flipped.

In 2019, Gao starred in the esports web series The King's Avatar, earning increased popularity for his role as Yu Wenzhou.

In 2021, he joined the cast of the variety show Call Me By Fire as a contestant.

In 2022, Gao starred as the male lead in Hunan TV's romantic comedy drama Dine with Love.

== Filmography ==
=== Film ===
Year	English title	Chinese title	Role	Notes
2012	80 Diao	80调	Gao Yu	
2014	Youth Hormones 2	青春荷尔蒙2躁动时代	Lei Yu	
2015	Ghost In Side	见诡 (附近的人)	Chen Bin	
2016	Putong Putong Hua Shaonian	扑通！扑通！花少年	Hua Shaonian	
2016	Alien: Fata Morgana	异类之行走的古堡	Lan Jue	
2016	Alien: Double Demons	异类之两生妖	Lan Jue	
2017	Planning of be in Love	小阴谋大爱情	Lin Yaozheng	
2018	Alien: The Clown	异类之异类之小丑	Lan Jue	
2018	Alien: Bloody Hunting	异类之嗜血追凶	Lan Jue	

=== Television series ===
Year	English title	Chinese title	Role	Notes
2011	Flight Attendant Diary	空姐日记	Sara's boyfriend	
2012	Chong Ba Zai Nan 2	冲吧宅男第二季	Gao Yu	
2012	Private Park	私人公园	Liang Yongtai	
2015	That Year	那一年之痞子老师	Chu Tiantan	
2015	The Diary of the Girl	女生日记之做决定事务所	He Xiaodong	
2015	Midnight Taxi	午夜计程车	Chen Da	
2016	Hello Mr. Right	老师晚上好	Shen Haoran	
2016	Acting Department	哎呦，表演系	Xu Bowen	
2017	Fighter of the Destiny	择天记	Xuanyuan Po	
2018	Legend of Fuyao	扶摇	Jiang Feng	
2018	S.C.I. Mystery	S.C.I.谜案集	Bai Yutong	
2018	Flipped	喜欢你时风好甜	Qi Xun	
2019	The King's Avatar	全职高手	Yu Wenzhou	
2019	Please Love Me	拜托拜托请你爱我	Lin Tiannuo	Special appearance
2020	Love is Sweet	半是蜜糖半是伤	Du Lei	
2020	Upon the Mountain	越过山丘	Peng Yue	
2021	Don't Mess with Girls	女孩子不好惹	Lin Nan	
2022	Dine with Love	陪你一起好好吃饭	Yu Hao	Main Male lead
2023	Thin Ice	薄冰	Xie Dongtian	
2023	Exploration Method of Love	爱的勘探法	Mu Xiu Lun	Main Male lead
TBA	Cyrano Agency	大鼻子情圣	Xu Youshen	
TBA	The Timeless Change	计时七点	Lin Nan	

=== Reality shows ===
Year	Title	Chinese title	Note	Ref.
2019	Super Penguin League; Season:2	超级企鹅联盟 Super3	Player; Live Basketball Competition	

== Awards and nominations ==
Year	Award	Category	Nominated work	Results	Ref.
2017	China Film Fashion Influence Awards	New Actor	Fighter of the Destiny	Won	
2018	Silk Road Cohesion Awards	Rising Actor	S.C.I. Mystery	Won	
2019	Golden Bud - The Third Network Film and Television Festival	Capable Actor of the Year	S.C.I. Mystery	Won	
