= And the Winner Is Love =

2020 Chinese television series

- Official poster
- 月上重火
- Genre: Wuxia / Romance
- Based on: Yue Shang Chong Huo by Junziyize
- Written by: Liu Xiaoxi; Sun Ying
- Directed by: He Shupei
- Starring: Luo Yunxi; Chen Yuqi
- Opening theme: "Unpredictable" by Lu Hu
- Ending theme: "Fate Ends" by Zhou Shen and Lu Hu
- Country of origin: China
- Original language: Mandarin
- No. of episodes: 48

Production
- Executive producers: Chen Sanjun; Luo Junhui
- Producers: Ningbo Film & TV; Perfect World Pictures
- Production location: China
- Running time: ≈45 minutes per episode

Original release
- Release: May 28 – July 5, 2020

And The Winner Is Love (月上重火) is a 2020 Chinese wuxia romance television series based on the novel of the same name by Junziyize, starring Luo Yunxi and Chen Yuqi. It is available on iQIYI with multi-languages subtitles starting May 28, 2020.

== Synopsis ==
Chong Xuezhi, the young mistress of Chonghuo Palace, leaves her home for the first time to experience the jianghu and runs into Shangguan Tou, master of Yueshang Valley. While outside, Chong Xuezhi finds out she has been banished from the palace after their treasured martial arts manual "Nine Techniques of the Lotus God" is stolen, and decides to track down the thief with the help of Shangguan Tou. After going through various trials and tribulations together, the traveling companions profess their love for each other and get married. News spreads that the perpetrator has already mastered the martial arts technique, and is wreaking havoc in the jianghu. The main couple discovers that the culprit is, in fact, Xia Qingmei, of the Sword Sect, and a bloody battle ensues.

== Cast ==
=== Main ===
Actor	Character	Introduction
Luo Yunxi	Shangguan Tou	Master of Moon (Yue Shang) Valley. Son of the Imperial Advisor Shangguan Xingzhou. Rumor says that he's a playboy, but he is actually a gentle and sweet person, who would do anything for the woman he loves. He was tasked by Chong Xuezhi's second father to protect her, and ends up falling in love with her.
Chen Yuqi	Chong Xuezhi	Young mistress of Fire (Chonghuo) Palace. Daughter of Chong Ye, the former master of Fire Palace. A naive but kind girl, who is the target of many assassinations because of Chong Ye's murders. She falls in love with Shangguan Tou after he saves her numerous times.
Zou Tingwei	Yuwen Muyuan	Chief Guardian of Fire (Chonghuo) Palace. Son of Yuwen Yupan and Chong Ye's adopted son. Has an unrequited love for Chong Xuezhi, and would do anything in order to protect her. He decides to ‘betray’ Fire Palace and work for Xue Lie, in order to protect Xuezhi and uncover Xue Lie's crimes. Killed by Xue Lie's subordinates.
Tian Yitong	Lin Fengzi	Young mistress of Sword (Lingjian) Mountain Manor. Has an unrequited love for Shangguan Tou. She and Shangguan Tou were involved in an incident which was the scheme of her master Yuan Shuang Shuang in order to banish him from Sword Manor. She later falls in love with Xia Qingmei.

== Production and reception ==
The series began filming in April 2019.

The series reunites Luo Yunxi, Chen Yuqi and Zou Tingwei from the 2017 drama Ashes of Love.

The series was commercially successful as the most-watched web drama between April and June.
