= Tian Yitong =

Chinese actress

Yitong Tian
- Born: December 9, 1994 (age 31); Tianjin, China
- Education: Shanghai Theatre Academy
- Occupation: Actress
- Years active: 2016–present
- Agent: Sunlight Media

Chinese name
- Simplified Chinese: 田依桐
Transcriptions
Standard Mandarin
- Hanyu Pinyin: Tián Yītóng

Birth name
- Simplified Chinese: 田一彤
Transcriptions
Standard Mandarin
- Hanyu Pinyin: Tián Yītóng

Yitong Tian (Chinese: 田依桐, born 9 December 1994), is a Chinese actress. She graduated from the Shanghai Theater Academy in 2017. She became known for her supporting roles in Chinese television dramas Perfect Partner and And The Winner Is Love.

== Career ==
In 2016, Tian debuted in the variety show Freshman on Hunan TV. She then starred in drama Beyond Light Years, playing the supporting role of Zhen Lei. In 2017, she graduated from the Shanghai Theater Academy and signed onto Sunlight Media, a studio co-founded by Zoe Ki and Tiffany Tang. The same year, she played supporting roles in historical drama Hero's Dream and romance drama My Amazing Boyfriend 2: Unforgettable Impression. In 2020, She gained recognition for starring Bonnie in modern drama Perfect Partner. The same year, she starred in Wuxia romance drama And The Winner Is Love as one of the main leads.

== Filmography ==
=== Television series ===
Year	English title	Chinese title	Role	Network	Notes/Ref.
2018	Beyond Light Years	初遇在光年之外	Zhen Lei	Youku	
2018	Hero's Dream	天意	Consort Yu	Youku	
2019	My Amazing Boyfriend 2: Unforgettable Impression	我的奇妙男友2之恋恋不忘	Ye Meixiao	Mango TV	
2019	Rules of Zoovenia	不可思议的晴朗	Qiao Lingling	Mango TV	
2020	Perfect Partner	完美关系	Bonnie	Hunan TV, Mango TV	
2020	And The Winner Is Love	月上重火	Lin Fengzi	Tencent Video, iQiyi, Youku	
2020	Nothing But Thirty	三十而已	Daisy	Dragon TV, Tencent Video	
2021	Cute Programmer	程序员那么可爱	Jiang Zitong	Tencent Video, WeTV	
2021	Lie to Love	良言写意	Shi Chuchu	Tencent, iQiyi	
2022	Love The Way You Are	爱情应该有的样子	Qin Yiran,	iQiyi	
