= Luo Yunxi =

Chinese actor (born 1988)

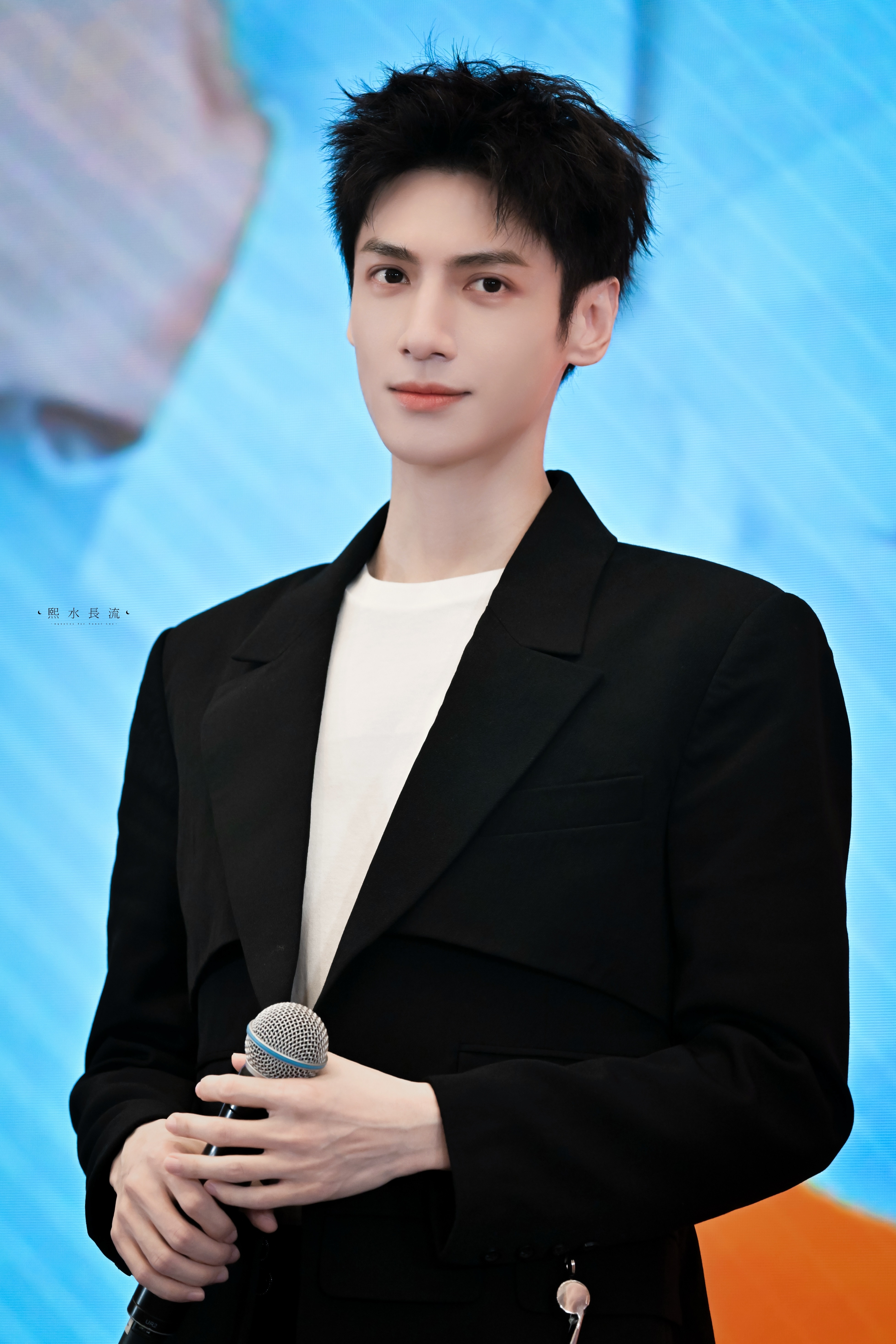
- Luo in 2025
- Born: Luo Yi (罗弋); July 28, 1988 (age 38); Chengdu, Sichuan, China
- Other name: Leo Luo
- Education: Shanghai Theater Academy
- Occupations: Actor; singer
- Years active: 2010–present
- Agents: Zhongshi Tongcheng; Luo Yunxi Studio
- Height: 1.77 m (5 ft 9 1/2 in)
- Musical career
- Label: Wonderful Music
- Formerly of: JBOY3

Chinese name
- Traditional Chinese: 羅雲熙
- Simplified Chinese: 罗云熙
Transcriptions
Standard Mandarin
- Hanyu Pinyin: Luó Yúnxī

Luo Yunxi (Chinese: 罗云熙, born July 28, 1988), also known by his English name Leo Luo, is a Chinese actor, singer and dancer. Luo first became known for his role in My Sunshine (2015), and gained widespread acclaim for his roles in Ashes of Love (2018), Love Is Sweet (2020), Till the End of the Moon (2023) and Whispers of Fate (2025). He graduated from the Shanghai Theater Academy, where he majored in ballet.

== Early life and education ==
Luo Yunxi, born Luo Yi (罗弋), was born and raised in Chengdu, Sichuan, China. At the age of 5, he began learning dance from his father (a professional dance instructor). For 11 years, Luo was trained professionally in ballet. In 2005, he was offered places at Beijing Dance Academy and Shanghai Theater Academy and chose to attend the latter. In 2008, Luo along with his classmates performed the group ballet dance "Tchaikovsky Rhapsody" at the 6th Lotus Award National College Dance Competition. His impromptu dance solo based on the randomly selected prompt "The Burning Flame" helped the group win the gold medal in the competition.

After graduation, he worked as a dance instructor at the School of Dance of Macao Conservatory. During this time, he participated in the stage performance as one of the lead dancers in the contemporary ballet "Flying to the Moon". The dance was selected to be performed during the celebration of 10th anniversary of Macau's transfer of sovereignty from Portugal in 2009.

== Career ==
=== 2010–2012: Musical career and foray into acting ===
In 2010, Luo debuted as part of the three-member boy group JBOY3 with the single "Promise of Love". The group released its second single "Gravity" on March 23, 2011, and the third single "Walking Emoji" on July 26, 2011. JBOY3 disbanded in 2012. Luo teamed up with one of the members, Jason Fu, to form duo Double JL (双孖JL). They released the single "JL" and the second single "Us" in August 2012. While part of Double JL, Luo auditioned for the singing reality competition show Asian Wave, and hosted an internet variety show Music ShowShowShow from December 2012 to March 2013. Double JL disbanded in 2013.

In 2012, Luo made his acting debut, when he was cast in the romance film The Spring of My Life. The film was released in theaters in 2015.

=== 2013-2017: Career progression ===
Luo was cast in his first drama Flip in Summer, which was not broadcast until 2018. In the years following, Luo was cast in the science fiction campus web drama Hello Aliens , crime drama Voice of the Dead and fantasy romance Fox in the Screen.

Luo experienced a surge in popularity after portraying the younger counterpart of the male protagonist in the hit romance drama My Sunshine.

In 2017, Luo co-starred in the fantasy romance drama A Life Time Love. He then played the lead role in the medical drama Children's Hospital Pediatrician.

=== 2018–present: Breakthrough and mainstream success ===
In 2018, Luo starred in the historical romance drama Princess Silver as a kind prince who inherits a deadly poison from his mother before birth. That same year, he rose to prominence starring as the kind Night Immortal who seeks to avenge his mother's death in fantasy romance drama Ashes of Love. The drama topped television ratings and online web rankings and Luo's portrayal of a morally ambiguous antagonist was met with critical acclaim.

The following year, Luo was cast in the romance drama Broker as a morally ambiguous corporate spy. In 2020, Luo starred in the wuxia romance drama And The Winner Is Love as the graceful young master of the Yueshang Valley. That same year, Luo was cast in the xianxia drama Immortality as a selfless and fearless grandmaster.

He also starred in the workplace romance drama Love is Sweet. The drama was iQiyi's most popular romance drama in 2020, and Luo received positive reviews for his role as an arrogant and charming investment bank executive. NetEase Entertainment's review praised Luo's acting, stating that, "Luo Yunxi's portrayal of Yuan Shuai is natural and expressive, resonating with the audience and evoking memories of their own unrequited love experiences."

Luo continued his foray into modern dramas where he was cast as a secretive CEO in Lie to Love, a lawyer-turned-volunteer rescue worker in Light Chaser Rescue and as a genius neurosurgeon who spearheads research on Huntington's disease in the 2023 medical romance drama Love is Panacea.

In 2023, Luo received international acclaim for his starring role in xianxia drama Till the End of the Moon as a prince who is born with an evil bone and must rebel against his destiny of becoming the Devil God.The drama premiered on Youku on April 6, 2023 and was a wild commercial success, both in China and in the international market. Youku had the highest number of downloads on the App Store since 2018. The drama's first-day market share was 22.76%, making it the most-watched period drama since 2020, and Luo's portrayal of the anti-hero received positive reviews. The show was broadcast in South Korea, Hong Kong, Thailand, Taiwan, and Malaysia.

Following the success of Till the End of the Moon, Luo starred in fantasy wuxia drama Whispers of Fate as a highly skilled martial artist who travels across the jianghu in his fight against destiny. The drama premiered on Mango TV and Migu Video on October 24, 2025 followed by an international release across more than 110 countries. According to the 2025 domestic TV drama viewership report released by the National Radio and Television Administration, Whispers of Fate achieved a local audience rating of 1.601% during its broadcast on Hunan TV and ranked first in viewership among TV dramas on Mango TV in 2025.

Later that year, Luo starred in 2025 suspense thriller The Truth Within as a forensic doctor. In addition, Luo portrayed a constable with a hidden identity in the supernatural period drama Shadow Punisher.

=== Renewed pursuit of Music: 2024–present ===
On June 1, 2024, Luo Yunxi gave his first solo concert titled This Moment X As Light to a sold out audience of 10K+ in his home town of Chengdu. The same year sees him attending his first music festival at the 2024 Flow Gourd Music festival in Anhui, China. In 2025, he gave several music performances with local TV networks Sichuan Television, CCTV1, Jianshu Television. He also attended the Changzhou Taihu Bay Music Festival on May 1 as well as the Baoji Ginkgo Music Festival in Shaanxi Province on Oct 2.

2026 has been a major year for Luo Yunxi's push into the music sector. He attended his first CCTV Spring Festival Gala, the most watched televised annual celebration of Chinese New Year, performing an upbeat song 立上游 alongside fellow actress Tan Songyun. He attended and performed "With You" from Whispers of Fate at Singapore's Red Star Awards on April 19. On July 20, he released his 3rd solo album Little Me for digital download and reached 27K album sales within 12 hours. On July 25, he kicked off his first ever concert tour titled Xiejie Infinite Theater in the city of Nanjing, China, followed by Guangzhou on Aug 8 and Chengdu on Sep 5.

== Other activities ==
The Madame Tussauds museums in Shanghai and Beijing installed wax figures of Luo in July 2023. The same month, Luo became the Chinese culture spokesperson for League of Legends. Due to the popularity of Till the End of the Moon, Luo was appointed as the China-Thailand Cultural Friendship Ambassador by the Tourism Authority of Thailand in October 2023. He became the Asian spokesperson for Forevermark in July 2026.

== Filmography ==
=== Film ===
Year	English title	Chinese title	Role	Notes	Ref.
2015	The Spring of My Life	最美的时候遇见你	Guo Yang		
2017	Dragon Force: So Long, Ultraman	钢铁飞龙之再见奥特曼	Chi Yan	Voice-over	

=== Television series ===
Year	English title	Chinese title	Role	Notes	Ref.
2015	My Sunshine	何以笙箫默	He Yichen (young)		
2016	The Love of Happiness	因为爱情有幸福	Su Lekai		
2017	A Life Time Love	上古情歌	Xuanyang Zhiruo		
2017	Children's Hospital Pediatrician	儿科医生	Shen He		
2018	Ashes of Love	香蜜沉沉烬如霜	Runyu		
2018	Flip in Summer	夏日心跳	Xiaoshen	Filmed in 2013	
2021	Broker	心跳原计划	Zhou Xiaoshan	Filmed in 2019	
2023	Love Is Panacea	治愈系恋人	Gu Yunzheng		
2025	Whispers of Fate	水龙吟	Tang Lici	Filmed in 2024	

=== Web series ===
Year	English title	Chinese title	Role	Notes	Ref.
2014	Hello Aliens	你好外星人	Guo Xin		
2016	Fox in the Screen	屏里狐	Yu Yan		
2016	Ultimate Ranger	终极游侠	Ju Heng		
2019	Princess Silver	白发	Rong Qi		
2019	The Code of Siam	异域档案之暹罗密码	Professor Qin	Cameo	
2020	And The Winner Is Love	月上重火	Shangguan Tou		
2020	Love is Sweet	半是蜜糖半是伤	Yuan Shuai		
2021	Guys with Kids	奶爸当家	Yu Bo	Filmed in 2015	
2021	Arcane	双城之战	Viktor	Voice actor for the Mainland Chinese-dubbed version	
2021	Lie to Love	良言写意	Li Zeliang		
2022	Light Chaser Rescue	追光者	Luo Ben		
2023	Till the End of the Moon	长月烬明	Tantai Jin / Cang Jiumin / Mingye		
2024	Follow Your Heart	颜心记	Jiang Xinbai		
2024	Arcane Season 2	双城之战	Viktor	Voice actor for the Mainland Chinese-dubbed version	
2025	The Truth Within	剥茧	Qi Sizhe		
2026	Shadow Punisher	魅影神捕	Li Si		
TBA	Corpse Whisperer	尸语者	Qin Ming	Filmed in 2016	
TBA	Immortality	皓衣行	Chu Wanning / Chu Xun	Filmed in 2020	

=== Television shows ===
Year	English title	Chinese title	Role	Notes	Ref.
2012	Asian Wave	声动亚洲	Contestant		
2017	Mr. Mossie Leo Logic	魔熙先生的云逻辑	Himself		
2018	Beyond it! Hero	超越吧！ 英雄	Cast member		
2019	Mr. Mossie+	魔熙先生+	Himself	Co-produced with Douyin	
2020	Mr. Mossie Season 3	魔熙先生第三季	Himself		

== Discography ==
=== Albums ===
Title	Album details	Tracks	Sales	Ref.
Love Yourself 12人生	Released: April 28, 2018; Label: Wonderful Music; Formats: Digital download, streaming	1. It's Not Me; 2. White Dancing Shoes; 3. Presumptions; 4. Movie Life; 5. Iron Man; 6. Brave; 7. Wutong Street; 8. Cold Apple; 9. Word Games		Free
X	Released: December 27, 2020; Label: Sound Jungle; Formats: Digital download, streaming	1. Waiting for the Wind to Stop; 2. Best; 3. In an Instant; 4. To a Lover Who Doesn't Exist; 5. Protect You; 6. The Normal State of Love; 7. Little Sparrow; 8. Star Fire; 9. Against the Current; 10. The person Standing in Eternity	CHN: 140,571	
Little Me	Released: July 20, 2026; Label: Sound Jungle; Formats: Digital download	1. Little Me; 2. Morning Star; 3. After Many Years; 4. The First Sound in the Universe; 5. Santario Tavern; 6. Maybe With You; 7. In Rongcheng; 8. Dreaming of a Spring Outing; 9. A New Day; 10. Unwavering Dream		

=== Singles ===
Year	English title	Chinese title	Album	Notes	Ref.
2015	Endless Summer	夏未央			
2016	Fox in the Screen	屏里狐	Fox in the Screen OST		
2019	Year of Reunion	团圆年		Performance for CCTV Lantern Festival	
2019	Against the Current	逆流而上		Singles sold (CHN): 354,128	
2020	Fate Begins	缘起	And the Winner Is Love OST		
2020	Chengdu	成都			
2020	Waiting for the Wind to Stop	等风停	X	Singles sold (CHN): 558,008	
2020	Spark of the Stars	星星之火	X	Released for fans as a birthday single	
2021	Because of You		Lie to Love OST		
2021	Original Aspiration	初心		Charity single	
2023	Traveller	旅人		Released as a birthday single	
2024	Unwavering Dream	不渝梦			
2024	Hanging on the Heart	心上悬	Follow Your Heart OST		
2025	Ever Forward	一往	Whispers of Fate OST	Lyricist	
2025	Cloud Knows	云知道		15th debut anniversary and 20th college anniversary, also composer	
2025	Winter Snow is Here	冬雪至		Performance for CMG (CCTV) New Year Gala 2026	
2026	Une Rencontre Éternelle	指尖上的微笑	Across the silk road, Music finds a kindred spirit	Luo Yunxi x Hélène Rollès for Dunhuang Cultural Tourism | Centre d'Art Rodin in Shanghai	Spotify Une Rencontre Éternelle YT Music Une Rencontre Éternelle

== Accolades ==
=== Awards and nominations ===
Year	Award	Category	Nominated work	Results	Ref.
2017	Mobile Video Festival	Annual Charity Star Role Model	N/A	Won	
2018	18th Chinese Campus Art Glory Festival	Most Popular Trendy Artist	N/A	Won	
2019	Golden Blossom - The Fourth Network Film And Television Festival	Best Actor	Princess Silver	Nominated	
2020	1st People's Daily Digital Communication and Fusion Screen Ceremony	Influential Actor	Children's Hospital Pediatrician	Won	
2020	China Literature Awards Ceremony	Heartthrob Actor	Princess Silver	Won	
2020	7th The Actors of China Awards	Best Actor (Web series)	Winner is Love	Nominated	
2020	iQIYI Screaming Night Festival	Popular Actor of the Year	Love is Sweet	Won	
2020	Golden Blossom - The Fifth Network Film And Television Festival	Best Actor	Winner is Love; Love Is Sweet	Nominated	
2020	Tencent Video All Star Awards	Popular TV Actor of the Year	Winner is Love	Won	
2021	2nd People's Daily Digital Communication and Fusion Screen Ceremony	Dynamic Actor	Winner is Love; Love Is Sweet	Won	
2023	Seoul International Drama Awards	Outstanding Asian Star	Till the End of the Moon	Won	
2025	Weibo TV and Internet Video Summit	Outstanding Actor of the Year	Whispers of Fate	Won	
2026	Weibo Music Awards 2026	Most Popular Singer of the Year		Won	

=== Ballet ===
Year	Award	Category	Results	Ref.
2003	Seventh Taoli Cup Dance Competition in China	Final Round	Won	
2008	Sixth Lotus Award National College Dance Competition in China	Gold Medal	Won	
2008	Professional Dance Competition in Six Provinces and One City in East China	Winning Prize	Won	
