= Zhao Min =

Fictional character in the novel The Heaven Sword and Dragon Saber by Jin Yong

- The Heaven Sword and Dragon Saber character
- Zhao Min in the 2021 mobile game The Legend of the Condor Heroes
- Created by: Jin Yong

In-universe information
- Aliases: Minmin Temür (birth name); Princess Shaomin (title)
- Gender: Female
- Family: Chaghan Temür (father); Köke Temür (brother)

Zhao Min
- Traditional Chinese: 趙敏
- Simplified Chinese: 赵敏
Transcriptions
Standard Mandarin
- Hanyu Pinyin: Zhào Mǐn
Yue: Cantonese
- Jyutping: Ziu^{6} Man^{5}

Minmin Temür
- Traditional Chinese: 敏敏特穆爾
- Simplified Chinese: 敏敏特穆尔
Transcriptions
Standard Mandarin
- Hanyu Pinyin: Mínmǐn Tèmùěr

Princess Shaomin
- Traditional Chinese: 紹敏郡主
- Simplified Chinese: 绍敏郡主
Transcriptions
Standard Mandarin
- Hanyu Pinyin: Shàomǐn Jùnzhǔ

Zhao Min (趙敏), birth name Minmin Temür (敏敏特穆爾), is one of the two female lead characters in the wuxia novel The Heaven Sword and Dragon Saber by Jin Yong. Jin Yong describes her appearance as "naturally elegant, with a bright countenance".

== Name and origins ==
In Mongolian, Temür (特穆爾) is not a family name; it is a variation of the more commonly spelled given name Timur (鐵木爾). Though some women have used it, Temür is typically a male name. Mongolian family names or tribal names typically do not appear in personal names. Historically, the family name of Chaghan Temür is Khorchi (豁里氏). Jin Yong may have mistaken Temür as a surname because Köke Temür and Chaghan Temür happened to have Temür in their given names.

Historically, Köke Temür was the nephew and adopted son of Chaghan Temür, likely because the latter had no biological son. Köke Temür had a younger sister, known as Lady Wang, who was a concubine of Zhu Shuang, a son of the Ming dynasty's founding emperor Zhu Yuanzhang. It is unclear if Lady Wang was Köke Temür's biological sister or Chaghan Temür's daughter.

== Fictional character biography ==
Zhao Min is a Mongol princess of the Yuan dynasty. Her elder brother is Köke Temür. Her father, Chaghan Temür, the Prince of Ruyang, has been appointed by the emperor to eliminate the Ming Cult, a martial arts sect seeking to overthrow the Yuan dynasty, and bring the wulin under the control of the Yuan government.

Zhao Min helps her father with his mission by stirring up conflict between the Ming Cult and the six major "orthodox" martial arts sects in the wulin. Under her command, she has several martial artists serving as mercenaries, including the Xuanming Elders, Huogong Toutuo's apprentices, and the "Divine Arrow Eight Heroes". She makes her first appearance in the novel by using poisoning martial artists from the six sects and imprisoning them in Wan'an Monastery in the Yuan capital Dadu. The poison does not kill but prevents the victims from using their neigong. As the six sects have recently made peace with the Ming Cult, Zhao Min intends to lure Zhang Wuji, the cult's new leader, into a trap and capture him. However, Zhang Wuji sees through her ruse and avoids being caught.

As the story progresses, Zhao Min and Zhang Wuji gradually become romantically attracted to each other, and a love triangle develops between them and Zhang Wuji's childhood friend, Zhou Zhiruo. Zhao Min even accompanies Zhang Wuji on his adventures as the first of three conditions in an agreement she made with him to free the captured martial artists. However, at one point, Zhang Wuji mistakenly believes that Zhao Min has murdered his cousin Yin Li, stolen the Heaven-Reliant Sword and Dragon-Slaying Saber, and fled with the two weapons. The real culprit is Zhou Zhiruo, who has framed Zhao Min for the murder and theft. When they reencounter each other later, Zhang Wuji refrains from killing Zhao Min even though he still thinks she is responsible and gradually begins to believe that Zhao Min is innocent as he discovers more evidence proving her innocence.

When Zhang Wuji and Zhou Zhiruo are about to be married, Zhao Min shows up and forces Zhang Wuji not to marry Zhou Zhiruo as the second condition of their earlier agreement. Zhang Wuji is reluctant, but he gives in when Zhao Min tells him she knows the whereabouts of his missing godfather, Xie Xun. Zhou Zhiruo, humiliated by Zhang Wuji's rejection, viciously attacks Zhao Min, but Zhang Wuji stops Zhou Zhiruo and saves Zhao Min.

By the end of the novel, Zhao Min decides to turn against her fellow Mongols and join Zhang Wuji because she has fallen in love with him. Zhang Wuji also concludes that Zhao Min is his true love, and the two of them want to retire from the wulin to lead a reclusive life. In the last chapter, Zhao Min tells Zhang Wuji that the third condition is to help her paint her eyebrows.

== In adaptations ==
Notable actresses who have portrayed Zhao Min in films and television series include Ho-Kau Chan (1963-5) Ching Li (1978), Liza Wang (1978), Kitty Lai (1986), Sharla Cheung (1993), Cecilia Yip (1994), Gigi Lai (2000), Alyssa Chia (2003), Ady An (2009), Chen Yuqi (2019) and Janice Man (2022).
