= Unchained Love =

2022–2023 Chinese television series

- Official poster
- 浮图缘
- Genre: Historical fiction; Comedy
- Based on: Stupa by You Sijie
- Written by: Li Jingling; Xiao Ouling; Zhang Xu
- Directed by: Wu Qiang
- Starring: Dylan Wang; Chen Yuqi; Peter Ho; Zeng Li
- Country of origin: China
- Original language: Mandarin

Production
- Production locations: Hengdian World Studios, Zhejiang, China
- Production companies: iQiyi; Strawbear; Think Culture; Always Be Better

Original release
- Network: iQiyi
- Release: 27 December 2022

Unchained Love (Chinese: 浮图缘; pinyin: Fú Tú Yuán) is a 2022 Chinese streaming television series directed by Wu Qiang and starring Dylan Wang, Chen Yuqi, Peter Ho, and Zeng Li. The series began airing on iQiyi from December 27, 2022.

== Synopsis ==
In the ancient Daye dynasty, Xiao Duo fakes being an eunuch and lurks in the royal court for years in order to find the murderer of his brother.

When the Emperor passes away, Bu Yinlou is forced to sacrifice herself for the former ruler, but is saved by Xiao Duo.

After defeating Empress Rong'an, Murong Gaogong inherits the throne, but different parties are still secretly vying for the throne. In such a dangerous imperial court, Xiao Duo and Bu Yinlou find themselves falling in love.

== Cast ==
=== Main ===
- Dylan Wang as Xiao Duo

The Chief of the Zhaoding Division, a fake eunuch.

- Chen Yuqi as Bu Yinlou

A court lady .

- Peter Ho as Murong Gaogong

The new Emperor.

- Zeng Li as Empress Rong'an

The Dowager Empress.

=== Supporting ===
- He Nan as Tong Yun

Bu Yinlou's handmaiden.

- Wang Lixin as Cao Chunang

The Deputy Chief of the Zhaoding Division.

== Production and release ==
- On September 14, 2022, the first trailer was released.
- On December 20, 2022, the series obtained the "web-distributed series" license from China National Radio and Television Administration.
- On December 23, 2022, it was announced that the release date was set for December 27, 2022.
- On January 3, 2023, The popularity exceeded 9000 heat index on iQiyi. Making it the first iQiyi A-Level drama to exceed 9000 heat index of popularity. Exceeding expectations for an A-Level drama to have a S+ effective broadcast.
