= Lie to Love =

Chinese television program

- Promotional poster
- Also known as: Good Words and Free Ideas
- Simplified Chinese: 良言写意
- Hanyu Pinyin: Liángyán xiěyì
- Genre: Rom-com; Mystery; Drama
- Based on: "Good Words Freehand" (良言写意) by Mu Fusheng
- Written by: Hu Xiaoshuai; Yan Nei
- Directed by: Chen Chang
- Starring: Luo Yunxi; Cheng Xiao
- Theme music composer: Chen Qixian
- Country of origin: China
- Original language: Mandarin
- No. of seasons: 1
- No. of episodes: 32

Production
- Executive producer: Wang Jingjing
- Producers: Fang Fang; Zhang Meng; Jiang Weiqin; Hao Guangyun; Dong Xiuyuan
- Production locations: Suzhou, China
- Running time: 45 minutes
- Production companies: Penguin Film and Television; Liubai Film and Television; Shanghai Jinhe Film and Television

Original release
- Network: iQIYI; Tencent Video; Youku
- Release: November 30 – December 27, 2021

Lie to Love (Chinese: 良言写意; pinyin: Liángyán xiěyì) is a 2021 Chinese television series based on a novel with the same title by Mu Fusheng, starring Luo Yunxi and Cheng Xiao. It aired in iQIYI and Tencent Video on 30 November until 27 December 2021 every Mondays, Tuesdays, Wednesdays, Thursdays for 32 episodes. The filming took place at Suzhou, Jiangsu province, China from 30 November 2020 – 9 March 2021.

== Synopsis ==
Brought by fate, a bright and bubbly Su Xieyi (played by Cheng Xiao) and the carefree Li Zeliang (played by Luo Yunxi) fall in love and spend their early days romantically. However, their feelings must be overshadowed by an unexpected change in Xieyi's family and life that point everything to Zeliang. In order to investigate the truth and bring justice, Xieyi pretends to have amnesia and returns to his side. Li Zeliang, now the heir of the conglomerate Oman Group upon the death of his father, must facing secret dealings and power plays within the company continuously. Xieyi treads every revenge step carefully till Zeliang's career fall down. As the truth start to be revealed slowly, Xieyi learns that she was wrongly blamed Zeliang and tries hard to restore their relationship. By the time goes, they rekindle their once romantic relationship and become great support to each other.

== Broadcast ==
Unless otherwise specified, all times are based on CST (UTC+8).

Channel	Country	Airing Date	Showing Time	Notes
Tencent Video	China	November 30, 2021	20:00	For members, two episodes aired from Tuesday to Thursday.; For non-members, two episodes aired every Monday to Wednesday.
iQIYI	China	November 30, 2021	20:00	For members, two episodes aired from Tuesday to Thursday.; For non-members, two episodes aired every Monday to Wednesday.
WeTV	Taiwan	November 30, 2021	20:00	For members, two episodes aired from Tuesday to Thursday.; For non-members, two episodes aired every Monday to Wednesday.
Alda Film Theater	Taiwan	May 4, 2022	19:00	Two episodes aired every Monday to Friday.
Tapmad Tv	Pakistan	14 Jan 2023	—	5 Episode Weekly in Urdu Dubbed

== Cast ==
=== Main ===
- Luo Yunxi as Li Zeliang

Vice President and Chairman of the conglomerate Oman Group. A good-looking and carefree man with great business strategizes in any situation. He once attracted to Xieyi and falls in love with her in early days before getting misunderstood by her.

- Cheng Xiao as Su Xieyi

Li Zeliang's temporary assistant and ex-girlfriend. Initially a lovely and kind-hearted girl, she must suffers a lot at her family's downfall due to an unexpected accident, which also lost her memory. She indeliberately blamed Zeliang for everything that had happened to her life. During her step of taking revenge, she slowly finds out that she was wrongly misunderstood him and tries hard to save their relationship.

=== Supporting ===
- Ji Xiaobing as Xie Minghao

Shen Shuqing's ex-fiancé, a charming and warm man who treats other kindly outside. He unexpectedly falls in love with Xieyi and has been protecting her after the Su family's accident, even becoming her most trusted person.

- Tian Yitong as Shi Chuchu

Daughter of Hengye Bank who has business cooperation with Li Zeliang. Generous and having outstanding work ability, she is very confident and decisive in workplace. She has known Zeliang since long time and secreetly falls for him. Although always acts strong, she slowly realizes that she can't beat Xieyi in gain his heart and choose not to pursue him anymore.

- Gao Han as Oscar / Hou Xiaodong

A bar owner who was born into a huge financial family, is best friend to Zeliang and Chuchu, also Xieyi's senior. Handsome but narcissistic, he is obsessed with music and indifferent to love.

- Tang Jingmei as Shen Xieqing

Su Xieyi's sister and Xie Minghao's ex-fiancée who always hold grudge against her own family after being instigated by Minghao. She discreetly suffers a mental illness.

- Guan Zijing as Ji Yingsong

Li Zeliang's skillful and loyal personal assistant, is the only one who can truly understand him and always help him handle everything.

- Zhao Zheng as Huo Jian

Chairman of Oman Group and Li Zeliang's uncle who always tries to take over the company.

- Li Jiajie as Gong Mingyue

A lively, sweet, silly employee of Oman Group with lots of material minds. She sees Xieyi as her opponent at first, but gradually becomes her only confidant in the company.

- Wang Ziyun as Yi Fei

Huo Jian's special assistant who has improper relationship with him, but always able to arrange her jobs appropriately.

- Hua Wen as Jessica

Oman Group's Manager of Human Resources Department and Xieyi's interviewer.

=== Others ===
- Shi Yu as Mr. Luo Man
- Huang Nina as Mrs. Luo Man
- Wang Zixuan as Lin Tai

Oman Group's former general secretary who is used as Huo Jian's tool to keeping eye on Li Zeliang.

- Yang Chen as Chen Hengsheng

General manager of Yunfeng Hotel, a subsidiary of Oman Group. He is actually Li Kuohai's assistant but betrayed him to get promoted and becomes Huo Jian's person.

- Liang Chao as Boss Qin

The unpredictable owner of Pinxuan Gallery who becomes Li Zeliang's subordinate.

- Wu Yaheng as Mr. Dai

General manager of Zhengde Hotel Group who regards Oman as his enemy.

- Zhang Lingyan as Mr. Dai's secretary
- Qu Gang as Shi Chuchu's father, director of Hengye Bank who is Oman's investor and major shareholder.
- Guo Donghai as Liu A'wei
- Han Hong as Liu Xiaoxiao, Liu A'wei's daughter.
- Sun Zhifeng as Li Xia, Liu A'wei's wife.
- He Xiaoqian as Li Fei
- Chai Junzhe as Chai Huo, Huo Jian's thus.
- Wang Zepei as He Jianghua, Chief editor of "Hotel World" magazine.
- Yuan Yuhan as Li Xiaoshu, Oman Group's employee.
- Cao Xuheng as Uncle Feng Mi, aa honey seller.
- Kevin Wang as Lin Qin
- Guo Qiucheng as Shen Zhihong

== Soundtrack ==
Lie to Love OST (良言写意 电视原声音乐专辑)
No.	Title	Lyrics	Music	Singer	Length
1.	"Silent Memory (寂静之忆)" (Opening Theme Song)	Chen Huan	Qiu Yancheng	Curley G
2.	"How Are You Doing (你最近好吗)" (Ending Theme Song)	Silence Wang	Silence Wang	Silence Wang
3.	"Because of You"	Li Zhaoxuan	Qiu Yancheng	Luo Yunxi
4.	"Light in The Tree Hole (树洞有光)"	Tang Tian, Li Zhaoxuan, Chen Huan	Qiu Yancheng	Li Runqi
5.	"Circle of Love"	Chen Huan	Qiu Yancheng	Zhang Tian
6.	"Underestimate the Enemy (轻敌)"	Wan Yi	Chen Qixian	Chen Qidong
7.	"Your Moon"	Chen Huan	Qiu Yancheng	Ariel Ann
8.	"Venus (启明星)"	Chen Huan	UrbanCla6ix	By2
9.	"My Sun (我的太阳)"	Chen Huan	Qiu Yancheng	Si Nan
10.	"Mr. Right"	Li Zhaoxuan, Chen Huan	Qiu Yan	Wang Rui
