= Riley Wang =

Canadian singer and actor

- Born: Wang Yilun; March 18, 1996 (age 30); Taiwan
- Other name: Riley King
- Occupations: Actor; singer; DJ
- Years active: 2015–present
- Agents: Comic International Productions (2015–17) Linekong Pictures (2017–19) As One Production; (2020–present)
- Height: 182 cm (6 ft 0 in)

Wang Yilun (Chinese: 王以纶; Pe̍h-ōe-jī: Ông Í-lûn, born March 18, 1996), better known by his stage name Riley Wang is a Canadian actor, singer, and DJ. He was a member of the Taiwanese boyband SpeXial from 2015 to 2017.

== Biography ==
Riley Wang was born in Taiwan, on March 18, 1996. His family immigrated to Canada when he was ten years old, where he spent most of his teen years. In 2012, Wang was ranked second in a modeling contest in Vancouver. In the second half of 2014, he joined the Taiwanese boy band SpeXial alongside two other new members. He debuted in SpeXial under his English name of "Riley" on January 13, 2015.

He debuted as an actor in 2017, playing the main role in the web series Long For You. He has also appeared in web series like Attention, Love!, Long For You 2, and I Hear You.

On August 25, 2017, Wang announced that he was going to leave SpeXial after his contract was rescinded due to "different career objectives." His departure from the group took place that same day. After his departure, SpeXial became a group of nine members.

== Personal life ==
=== Social media presence ===
In opposition to his Weibo and Instagram updates, Wang takes to Twitter with an informal side with his small audience, which consist of him tweeting primarily in English (with the occasion of not to promote other SNS posts), posting memes frequently, and giving insight as an actor or fanboying over Kpop, notably the girl group Twice.

== Filmography ==
=== Film ===
| Year | English title | Chinese title | Role | Notes/Ref. |
|---|---|---|---|---|
| 2016 | The Realm of the Immortals | 仙侠学院 | Lu Fan | |
| 2017 | The Prequel of Magical Brush: Demon's Portrait | 玄笔录前传之妖王图 | Wu Xiaoxie | |
| 2017 | The Prequel of Magical Brush: The Devil Lands | 玄笔录前传之异域魔道 | Wu Xiaoxie | |
| 2017 | The Prequel of Magical Brush: Suffering | 玄笔录前传之七苦 | Wu Xiaoxie | |
| 2017 | The Prequel of Magical Brush: Dreams | 玄笔录前传之幻梦 | Wu Xiaoxie | |
| 2017 | The Prequel of Magical Brush: Sacrificial Altar | 玄笔录前传之怨妖坛 | Wu Xiaoxie | |
| 2017 | The Prequel of Magical Brush: Guardian | 玄笔录前传之守护使命 | Wu Xiaoxie | |
| 2022 | Mozart from Space | 外太空的莫扎特 | Preliminary Teacher | Guest |

=== Television series ===
| Year | English title | Chinese title | Role | Network | Notes/Ref. |
|---|---|---|---|---|---|
| 2017 | Long for You | 我与你的光年距离 | Li Zhe | LeTV | |
| 2017 | Attention, Love! | 稍息立正我爱你 | Wang Jinli | CTV | |
| 2018 | Long for You 2 | 我与你的光年距离II | Ye Gu | LeTV | |
| 2019 | I Hear You | 最动听的事 | Ye Shuwei | Mango TV, Youku | |
| 2019 | Nine Kilometers of Love | 九千米爱情 | Lin Shu | Tencent | |
| 2020 | Everyone Wants to Meet You | 谁都渴望遇见你 | Tao Lun | iQIYI | |
| 2020 | First Romance | 初恋了那么多年 | Yan Ke | Youku | |
| 2020 | Love Is Sweet | 半是蜜糖半是伤 | Li Xiaochuan | iQIYI | |
| 2021 | Be Yourself | 机智的上半场 | Gao Yuan | Youku | Guest role |
| 2022 | Song of the Moon | 月歌行 | A Fujun | iQIYI | |
| 2023 | Choice Husband | 择君记 | Song Xiyuan | Tencent | |
| 2023 | Sisters, Bottoms Up! | 举杯畅饮的姐姐们 | Wang Tong | Youku | Support role |
| 2023 | Back from the Brink | 护心 | Bai Xiaosheng | Youku | Support role |
| 2023 | Egg and Stone | 少女闯江湖 | Mu Binghe | iQIYI | Support role |
| 2024 | Fangs of Fortune | 大梦归离 | Ran Yi | iQIYI | Guest role |
| 2025 | A Dream Within a Dream | 书卷一梦 | Shangguan He | iQIYI | Support role |
| 2025 | Whispers of Fate | 水龙吟 | Fang Pingzhai | Hunan TV, Mango TV | Support role |
| TBA | Private Shushan College | 私立蜀山学园 | Qiu Qi | Tencent | |
| TBA | The Legend of Rosy Clouds | 云秀行 | Gao Ran | iQIYI | Support role |
| TBA | Fate Chooses You | 佳偶天成 | Jin Lun | iQIYI | |
| TBA | Gu Le Feng Hua Lu | 古乐风华录 | Wu Rao | Tencent | Support role |
| TBA | Key to the Phoenix Heart | 雀骨 | Li Mao | iQIYI | Support role |

== Discography ==
| Year | English title | Chinese title | Role | Notes/Ref. |
|---|---|---|---|---|
| 2017 | "Fight for You" | | Long For You OST | |
| 2018 | "The Future Road" | 未来的路 | Unexpected OST | |
| 2018 | "Polar Warmth" | 极地温暖 | Long for You 2 OST | |
