= See You Again (2022 TV series) =

2022 Chinese streaming television series

- 超时空罗曼史
- Genre: Time travel Romance
- Written by: Ling Qi, Wang Bing, Chen Zihao, Duan Lanli
- Directed by: Wang Feng
- Starring: Hu Yitian; Chen Yuqi
- Country of origin: China
- Original language: Mandarin
- No. of seasons: 1
- No. of episodes: 30

Production
- Production locations: Shanghai, Suzhou
- Running time: 45 minutes
- Production companies: iQIYI; Chinese Miracle (Note: Chinese Miracle is a joint-company established by COL Digital Publishing and IQIYI.)

Original release
- Network: iQIYI
- Release: 5 September – 7 October 2022

See You Again (Chinese: 超时空罗曼史; pinyin: Chāoshíkōng Luómànshǐ) is a 2022 Chinese streaming television series. The series is directed by Wang Feng, and stars Hu Yitian, Chen Yuqi, Wang Tian Chen, Bai Bing. The series is airing on iQIYI from September 5 to October 7, 2022.

== Synopsis ==
A famous movie star named Xiang Qinyu lived at Shanghai in 1936. One day, he got gunshot and suddenly found himself time-travelled to modern Shanghai in 2018. He then starts a romantic story with his fan Jin Ayin, and searches for the truth of gunshot.

== Cast ==
- Hu Yitian
  - as Xiang Qinyu, a famous movie star time-travelled from 1936
  - as Chi Yu, a rookie movie actor
- Chen Yuqi
  - as Jin Ayin, a rookie screenwriter, she is also a fan of Xiang Qinyu
  - as Jin Zi, a person lived in 1936
- Wang Tian Chen as Li Longda, a rookie movie actor
- Bai Bing as Chen Mumu, a film producer of River Film

== Production ==
The series began filming on March 8, 2021, at Shanghai and wrapped up on June 10, 2021.
