= Ai Mi =

Chinese actress (born 2008)

- 艾米
- Born: Amy Chen; 13 July 2008 (age 18); Beijing, China
- Other names: Aimee; Amy
- Occupation: Actress
- Years active: 2014–present
- Agent: TH Entertainment
- Notable work: Destined

Chinese name
- Simplified Chinese: 陈艾米
- Traditional Chinese: 陳艾米
Transcriptions
Standard Mandarin
- Hanyu Pinyin: Chén Àimǐ

Amy Chen (Chinese: 陈艾米; pinyin: Chén Àimǐ; born 13 July 2008), better known by the stagename Ai Mi (Chinese: 艾米) is a Chinese actress. She is managed by the talent agency TH Entertainment.

== Early life and education ==
Ai Mi was born on 13 July 2008 in Beijing; her family is originally from Xinyang, Henan. She began acting as a child in 2014.

In 2026, she took the entrance examination for the acting programme of the Beijing Film Academy, where she scored 83.5 and placed third nationally, the highest-scoring female applicant. On her eighteenth birthday, 13 July 2026, she released her debut single "Fall in Love".

== Filmography ==
=== Film ===
Year	Title	Role	Notes	Ref.
2014	Children's Picture			
2015	Ulterior Motive	Ye Shuang's daughter		
2018	Ramen Prince	Little Prince		
2019	Guilt by Design	Hui Chung-yan		
2019	Orochi 2	Wei Jiahuan		
2019	Liberation	Lin Moxue		
2020	Double World	Binu (childhood)		
2020	The Yin-Yang Master: Dream of Eternity	Shikigami Honey Bug		
2021	Song That Takes you Home			
2021	The Yinyang Master	Bai Ni (teen)		
2021	The Battle at Lake Changjin	Cameo		
2022	In The Name of Youth	Fan Xing	web movie	
2022	The Person Who Loves Me Most in the World	Ding Yan		
2022	In Search of Lost Time	Du Siheng (young adult)		
2024	Big Breakout	Xiao Wen		
2025	Creation of the Gods II: Demon Force			
2026	Kung Fu Soccer	Chusan		

=== Television ===
Year	Title	Role	Notes	Ref.
2016	People's Prosecutor			
2017	Rakshasa Street			
2018	Bloom, Lily			
2019	Heavenly Sword and Dragon Slaying Sabre	Shi Hongshi		
2020	Serenade of Peaceful Joy	Empress Guo (young)		
2020	The Twin Flower Legend			
2020	Maiden Holmes	Su Ci (young)	web-series	
2020	Miss S	Li Yujuan (young)		
2021	Minning Town	Beibei		
2021	Yu Zhao Ling	Small mosquito		
2021	Miss Crow And Mr Lizard	Jiang Xiaoning (young)	web-series	
2021	Yulouchun	Yao Dizhu (young)		
2021	Novoland: Pearl Eclipse	Salia		
2022	Challenges at Midlife	Choi Ki-jin (young)		
2022	Who Rules the World	Bai Langhua	web-series	
2022	The Blood of Youth	Huanji	web-series	
2023	Destined		web-series	
2023	My Journey to You	Yun Que		
2023	Scent of Time	Qian Zhi	web-series	
2024	The Double	Tong'er		
2024	Teresa Teng	Teresa Teng (young)	Shot in 2018	
2024	Fangs of Fortune	Qing Geng	web-series	
2025	Love the Divine Tree	Qiu Xi'er	web-series	
2025	Good Will Society	Yu Jia		
2025	Hidden Shadow	Ru Yan		
2025	Whispers of Fate	Shuiduo Po		
2026	Key to the Phoenix Heart	Xie Jiayu		
2026	Pull strings	Lan Ling'e		
