= Till the End of the Moon =

2023 Chinese television series

- Official Poster
- Traditional Chinese: 長月燼明
- Simplified Chinese: 长月烬明
- Hanyu Pinyin: Chángyuè Jìn Míng
- Genre: Xianxia; Fantasy; Romance
- Based on: Black Moonlight Holds the BE Script by Teng Luo Wei Zhi
- Written by: He Fang, Luo Xuan
- Directed by: Kuk Kok-Leung; Wang Haiqi
- Starring: Luo Yunxi; Bai Lu
- Composer: Guan Dazhou
- Country of origin: China
- Original language: Mandarin
- No. of seasons: 1
- No. of episodes: 40

Production
- Executive producers: Meng Jun; Xie Ying; Ye Fangcang
- Producers: Wang Yirong; Zhou Jing; Xin Weimin
- Production location: Hengdian World Studios
- Running time: 50 min
- Production companies: Youku; Otters Studio

Original release
- Network: Youku
- Release: 6 April 2023 – May 9, 2023

Till the End of the Moon (Chinese: 长月烬明; pinyin: Chángyuè Jìn Míng) is a Chinese television series based on the novel Black Moonlight Holds the BE Script (黑月光拿稳BE剧本) by Teng Luo Wei Zhi (藤萝为枝), starring Luo Yunxi and Bai Lu. The series aired on Youku with 40 episodes on April 6, 2023. The drama was an international and domestic success breaking several records.

The novel the series was based on was licensed on English by Seven Seas Entertainment.

== Synopsis ==
In order to save the world from Devil God Tantai Jin (澹台烬), Li Susu (黎苏苏), daughter of Hengyang Sect's leader, travels back 500 years and takes over the body of Ye Xiwu (叶夕雾). She is tasked to destroy the mortal Tantai Jin to prevent his transformation into the Devil God which was inhabiting his body via an evil bone embedded inside him. Unbeknownst to her, Ye Xiwu is married to Tantai Jin, who is currently a hostage prince from the Kingdom of Jing (景国). The two develop romantic feelings for each other, and Tantai Jin who was born without the ability to love, started falling in love with Li Susu. Li Susu who had intended initially to destroy him ended saving him repeatedly instead and even sacrifices herself in her attempts to change the fate of Tantai Jin and the world.

After losing Li Susu, a grief-stricken Tantai Jin searches for her soul for 500 years and was rescued by a cultivation sect. He becomes a disciple of the Xiaoyao Sect and meets the reborn Li Susu again. Just as the two rekindle their love, the revelation of Tantai Jin's birth nature nonetheless brings the three realms into danger again and Tantai Jin finally understood why Li Susu was often in a predicament when facing their relationship. Facing a brutal fate, Tantai Jin sets in motion a plan to stop the end of the world. This time however, he will decide the outcome.

== Cast ==
=== Main ===
- Luo Yunxi as (澹台烬) / Cang Jiumin (沧九旻) / Mingye (冥夜)
  - Tantai Jin (澹台烬): He is the fated Devil God, a powerful being that is the embodiment of all evil karma and will only bring death and destruction to the world. However, 500 years ago he is simply a mere mortal who is unable to feel human emotions due to the existence of an evil bone and his identity as the devil fetus. He can only hide this characteristic by imitating the reactions of those around him. Ridiculed and isolated due to this characteristic, Tantai Jin is sent to the Kingdom of Sheng as a hostage prince at the age of six, yet later escapes back to the Kingdom of Jing and becomes the ruling king.
  - Cang Jiumin (沧九旻): Alias of Tantai Jin while he was a cultivation disciple of Xiaoyao Sect's leader Zhaoyou. While there, Tantai Jin learns the concepts of honesty, loyalty and the fact that he is able to make his own choices about his destiny.
  - Mingye (冥夜): Tantai Jin enters the Wise and Fleeting Life dream (Bore Fusheng 般若浮生) of Mingye. He lives as Mingye, the powerful God of War and leader of the Upper Immortal Realm who sees it as his duty to protect the world. Mingye creates the Wise and Fleeting Life dream and leaves a thread of his soul in the heart-protecting scale to guide Tantai Jin along the path of righteousness.
  - Original Devil God (初代魔神): Born when Fuxi and Nüwa created the world, the Devil God is relegated to taking in the world's sins. Armed with his evil bone, the bone-refining seal created from his heart, the god-slaying crossbow created from his bone and the sky-slashing sword created from hellfire, the Devil God plans to open the All-in-Distress Way and return the world back to primordial central chaos. To ensure his resurrection in case the plan fails, he signs a pact with the Moon Tribe for them to be the guardian of the devil fetus.
- Bai Lu as Li Susu (黎苏苏) / Ye Xiwu (叶夕雾) / Sangjiu (桑酒)
  - Li Susu (黎苏苏): Born an immortal, she is introduced as the daughter of the leader of the Hengyang Sect. She is the Chosen One to use the Mirror of the Past to save the cultivation World.
  - Ye Xiwu (叶夕雾): The younger daughter of General Ye of the Kingdom of Sheng, married to Tantai Jin. This is the body Li Susu takes over when she travels back 500 years.
  - Sangjiu (桑酒): Li Susu enters the Fleeting Life dream (般若浮生) of a dragon as Sangjiu, a clam princess. After her clan's crown jewel was used to save an injured Mingye, Sangjiu becomes his consort.

=== Supporting ===
- Chen Duling as Ye Bingchang (叶冰裳) / Mo-nü (妺女) / Tianhuan (天欢)
  - Ye Bingchang (叶冰裳): Ye Xiwu's older sister, married to Prince Xiao Lin. She has two love threads, enabling her to fall in love and be loved by those around her.
  - Mo-nü (妺女): A drought demon. Sister of Siying who reconnects with Gongye Jiwu. Siying's older sister
  - Tianhuan (天欢): An immortal and daughter of Mingye's predecessor. She has an unrequited love for Mingye. She was from a clan known for being bloodthirsty.
- Deng Wei as Xiao Lin (萧凛) / Gongye Jiwu (公冶寂无) / Sangyou (桑佑)
  - Prince Xiao Lin (萧凛): The sixth prince of the Kingdom of Sheng. An upright general and Ye Bingchang's husband.
  - Gongye Jiwu (公冶寂无): Li Susu's older disciple brother in the Hengyang Sect.
  - Sangyou (桑佑): A clam prince and Sangjiu's older brother.

==== The Kingdoms ====
- Geng Yeting as Ye Qingyu (叶清宇), Ye Xiwu's younger brother who is a strict and upright head of the family, Pianran's love interest
- Xiao Shunyao as Tantai Minglang (澹台明朗), Tantai Jin's older brother
- Li Peien as Pang Yizhi (庞宜之), an official and Prince Xiao Lin's co-conspirator. Jize was his master.
- Li Jiahao as Nian Baiyu (廿白羽), Tantai Jin's loyal bodyguard from the Moon Tribe
- He Zhonghua as the King of Sheng (盛王), father to Prince Xiao Lin
- Liu Min as Jing Lan'an (荆兰安), servant to Tantai Jin's mother and chief of the Moon Tribe
- Chang Lufeng as Ye Xiao (叶啸), decorated general and Ye Xiwu's father
- Deng Jinghong as Ye Zeyu (叶泽宇), Ye Xiwu's older brother
- Huang Yunyun as Yue Yingxin (月莹心), Tantai Jin's maid from the Moon Tribe
- Tian Jingfan as Chuntao (春桃), Ye Xiwu's maid
- Wang Jialin as the King of Jing (景王), father to Tantai Jin
- Quni Ciren as Yue Ruanruan (月阮阮) Consort Rou and Tantai Jin's mother
- Zhao Shiyi as Fuyu (符玉), a cultivator who is loyal to Tantai Minglang
- Zhao Muyan as Jiahui (嘉卉), Ye Bingchang's loyal maid

==== Barren Abyss ====
- Sun Zhenni as Pianran (翩然), a (originally nine-tailed) seven-tailed fox demon, general in Tantai Jin's army and Ye Qingyu's love interest
- Yu Bo as Dimian (谛冕), Li Susu's birth father, a demon who falls for Chuhuang
- Wang Yifei as Siying (姒婴), a drought demon and loyal general to the Devil God, Mo-nü's sister
- Wang Xizhao as Jingmie (惊灭), a demon and loyal general to the Devil God
- Wang Yunzhi as the Dream Demon (梦妖), a demon that eats people's dreams

==== Immortal Cultivation Realm ====
- Huang Haibing as Zhaoyou (兆悠), leader of the Xiaoyao Sect who becomes Tantai Jin's mentor
- Zheng Guolin as Qu Xuanzi (衡玄子), leader of the Hengyang Sect and Li Susu's adopted father
- Huang Xinyao as Yue Fuya (月扶崖), Lan'an's daughter
- Lin Shengyi as Canghai (藏海), eldest disciple of Xiaoyao Sect
- Li Xinglin as Canglin (藏林), second disciple of Xiaoyao Sect
- Wang Jiamin as Cangfeng (藏风), third disciple of Xiaoyao Sect

==== Twelve Ancient Gods ====
- Zhang Zhixi as Chuhuang (初凰), a phoenix and ancient goddess who controls space, and also Li Susu's birth mother.
- Chen Bohao as Jize (稷泽), the ancient god who controls time. He is the only god remaining in the present timeline, and has guarded the desert abyss for ten thousand years. After Li Susu successfully completes her mission of removing the evil bone, he passes away.
- Qi Xiaxia as God of Wind (风神)
- Zhu Lilan as God of Gold (金神)
- Jin Chao as God of Thunder (雷神)
- Zhao Yuanyuan as God of the Moon (月神)
- Li Junchen as God of the Sun (日神)
- Li Jingyi as God of Fire (火神)
- Chen Heyi as God of Water (水神)
- Zhou Xiaofei as God of Earth (土神)
- Shen Ruina as God of Wood (木神)

== Original soundtrack ==
No.	Title	Lyrics	Music	Singer	Length
1.	"Not Exceeding (不逾)"	Ji Ruzhuo, Wang Yirong	Shen Wugu, Yang Lan	Ye Xuanqing, Zhang Yuan	4:18
2.	"My First Time Loving (第一次爱人)"	Liu Chang	Tan Xuan, Lei Li	Zhang Lei	4:15
3.	"Black Moonlight (黑月光)" (Ending theme song)	Duan Sisi	Tan Xuan, Terence Teo	Zhang Bichen, Mao Buyi	4:35
4.	"Entrust the Long Moon (寄长月)"	Zhang Jingyi	Liu Xuandou	Bu Cai	4:49
5.	"Boundary (界)"	Zhang Jingyi, Wang Yirong	Liu Xuandou	Tia Ray	3:51
6.	"The World I Love (我爱的这个世界)" (Opening theme song)	Duan Sisi	Tan Xuan, Terence Teo	Liu Yuning	5:28
7.	"Black Bird (玄鸟)"	Saji	Saji, Song Yang	Saji	4:16
8.	"Ordinary Song (寻常歌)"	Huai Xiu	Youjun	Bu Cai	4:47
9.	"Let's Be Like This for 10000 Years (要不然我们就这样一万年)"	Duan Sisi	Li Jianheng, Li Chengxuan	Huang Xiaoyun	4:44
10.	"Use Me As A Body(以我之躯)"	Zhang Pengpeng	Guan Dazhou	Huang Xiaoyun	4:10
11.	"Silent Moon (月烬无声)"	Zhang Jingyi, Wang Yirong	Liu Xuandou	Tiger Hu	3:53
12.	"Holding onto A Thought (执一念)"	Jing Ta	Guan Dazhou, Yu Wei	Huang Ling	4:01
13.	"Only You (只你)"	Xiang Han, Gu Ruyuan	Li Jianheng, Li Chengxuan	Shuang Sheng	3:19

== Production ==
The series began filming on October 16, 2021, and finished on March 26, 2022. This series marks the second Otter Studios production with Luo Yunxi in the leading role. It also features Huang Wei as costume director, Zeng Minghui as styling director, Luan Hexin as art director, and commissioned Huatian Studio to do worldbuilding.

== Reception ==
Till the End of the Moon is a commercial success in China, helping Youku reach the highest number of downloads on the App Store since 2018, and netted a premiere day market share of 22.76% to become the most-watched period drama since 2020.

The drama has broken the record to become the drama with the highest official merchandise sales earning over 21 million yuan in overall sales as of May 2023. Mingye's bracelet was the most popular item, earning over 5 million yuan as of 18 May 2023.

Till the End of the Moon has been praised for its innovative storyline that emphasises the hero's understanding of his existence and the strength of the hero's internal locus of control. Its exquisite costumes, depictions of Dunhuang culture and Chinese mythology have been credited with promulgating classic Chinese culture. It is credited with boosting tourism direct GDP for relatively unknown cities of Bengbu and Xuancheng due to similarity to existing statues and place names. Bengbu for example, received a record amount of tourists during the end of April and the 2023 Labour Day holiday period with tourism GDP totalling to 2.594 billion largely due to the popularity of the series.

The drama was included in Alibaba Group's June Quarter 2023 Results as a contributor to Youku's total subscription revenue growth of 5% year-over-year and revenue of RMB5,381million (US$742 million) for the Digital Media and Entertainment Group.

Till the End of the Moon was included as the third most popular Chinese cultural intellectual property of the year, wholly representing the keyword gufeng xianxia in the 2023 Annual Report on the Chinese Cultural Symbols International Communication Index released at the World Internet Conference. CCTV's CPOP program named the drama as one of the top five dramas with global appeal.

=== Accolades ===
Year	Award	Category	Nominees	Result	Ref.
2023	Seoul International Drama Awards	Outstanding Asian Star	Luo Yunxi	Won	
2023	Seoul International Drama Awards	Best Series Drama	—N/a	Nominated	
2023	2023 Weibo Night	TV Series of the Year	—N/a	Won	

== International Broadcast ==
Network	Country	Ref.
MOA	South Korea	
TrueID	Thailand	
Viu	Hong Kong	
Line TV	Taiwan	
8TV	Malaysia	
Netflix	International	
