= Ma Qiuyuan =

Chinese actress (born 1999)

- 马秋元
- Born: 12 September 1999 (age 27); Zhoukou, Henan, China
- Education: Xi'an Technological University
- Occupation: Actress
- Years active: 2022–present

Ma Qiuyuan (simplified Chinese: 马秋元; traditional Chinese: 馬秋元; pinyin: Mǎ Qiūyuán; born 12 September 1999) is a Chinese actress who works mainly in vertical short dramas (短剧). She rose to prominence from 2022 through a series of short dramas released on Douyin, and became known for works such as Yibuxiaoxin Liao Cuoren, Dang Tishen Wo Yuexin Baiwan and Hei Lianhua Shangwei Shouce.

== Early life ==
Ma Qiuyuan was born on 12 September 1999 in Zhoukou, Henan. She grew up with her parents in Xinjiang, and studied economics at Xi'an Technological University.

== Career ==
In early 2022, Ma Qiuyuan began acting in short dramas, first taking the female lead in Zhui'ai Da Zuozhan, part of the Xiao Monü Qiuyuan series released on Douyin. In February 2023 she appeared in Huidao Gudai Dang Taizi, and in April that year in Shijian Wanwu Buji Ni. Through works such as Dang Tishen Wo Yuexin Baiwan and Yibuxiaoxin Liao Cuoren, she gradually became known to audiences.

Also in 2023, the short drama Hei Lianhua Shangwei Shouce, in which she starred, became popular and was likened to a short-drama version of Empresses in the Palace. From 2024 she expanded into longer horizontal-screen dramas such as Qinggong Ci, Sanjia Mojun and Qintian Qitan, and also performed several of their theme songs.

== Selected filmography ==
| Year | Title | Role |
|---|---|---|
| 2022 | Zhui'ai Da Zuozhan (Xiao Monü Qiuyuan series) | Qiuyuan |
| 2023 | Luoyang Gongzhu | Luoyang |
| 2023 | Yibuxiaoxin Liao Cuoren | Minghua |
| 2023 | Dang Tishen Wo Yuexin Baiwan | Chu Cheng |
| 2023 | Hei Lianhua Shangwei Shouce | Song Zhao |
| 2023 | Xiang'ai Chuansuo Bainian | Yunxi |
| 2023 | Pianpian Chong'ai | Lin Xiaxi |
| 2024 | Qinggong Ci | Mu Changhuan |
| 2024 | Luohua Shijie You Feng Jun | Song Zhaorong |
| 2024 | Zhenshang Chenghuan | Jiang Chenghuan |
| 2024 | Shenzhai Jinjie Lu | Gu Qingyi |
| 2025 | Sanjia Mojun | Jiang Zhiyu |
| 2025 | Qintian Qitan | Li Lingyue |
| 2025 | Yingfeng Gui | Jiang Leyao |
| 2026 | Quegu | Li Lejun |
