= Immortality (TV series) =

Pending Chinese television series

- Chinese: 皓衣行
- Hanyu Pinyin: Hàoyī Xíng
- Genre: Xianxia
- Based on: The Husky and His White Cat Shizun by Meatbun Doesn't Eat Meat
- Directed by: He Shupei
- Starring: Luo Yunxi; Chen Feiyu
- Country of origin: China
- Original language: Mandarin Chinese
- No. of seasons: 1
- No. of episodes: 50

Production
- Producers: Qi Shuai; Ye Fangcang; Wang Yirong; Yu Yalian; Liu Beibei; Luo Xuan
- Production location: Hengdian World Studios
- Production companies: Tencent Penguin Pictures; Otters Studio

Original release
- Network: Tencent Video

Immortality (Chinese: 皓衣行; pinyin: Hàoyī Xíng) is an upcoming Chinese television series based on the BL xianxia novel The Husky and His White Cat Shizun (Chinese: 二哈和他的白猫师尊; pinyin: Èr Hā Hé Tā De Bái Māo Shī Zūn) by Meatbun Doesn't Eat Meat (Chinese: 肉包不吃肉; pinyin: Ròubāo Bùchī Ròu), starring Luo Yunxi and Chen Feiyu. The series was expected to air on Tencent Video in April 2021. Filming began in April 2020 and wrapped up in September. The show's broadcast schedule has not been determined, however, due to a 2021 order from the National Radio and Television Administration.

== Synopsis ==
The story is set in a tumultuous era, with the world facing an impending invasion from the demon world due to a rift in the heavens. Chu Wanning, a powerful cultivator, sets out on a mission to protect the world. He uses his abilities to prevent the heavens from splitting, while compassion influences his misguided disciple Mo Ran to return to the righteous path he has strayed from. Chu successfully imparts the value of putting the greater good before personal desires upon Mo. In the end, the pair dedicate their lives to working with other cultivators to protect the world from villains.

== Cast ==
=== Main ===
Actor	Character	Introduction
Luo Yunxi; Huang Yi (teen); Lin Ziye (child)	Chu Wanning (楚晚宁)	Also known as Yuheng of the Night Sky (晚夜玉衡) and the Beidou Immortal (北斗仙尊), he is a grandmaster of the cultivation world who hides his caring and sensitive nature behind a cold exterior. He devotes his time to the thankless task of sealing the rifts in the barrier between the ghost realm and the mortal realm and often spends his spare time creating affordable mechanical devices such as the Holy Night Guardian, so ordinary people can protect themselves from ghosts. Chu takes it upon himself to protect people and rid the world of evil, even if it means sacrificing himself.
Chen Feiyu; TBA (young)	Mo Ran (墨燃)	Courtesy name: Mo Weiyu (墨微雨); Mo Ran is Chu Wanning's third disciple, a confident and mischievous cultivator though not the brightest student. Emperor of the cultivation world Mo Weiyu deceived elders, slaughtered ancestors, and committed all crimes and sins known to humanity. After ending his own life at the age of 32, he transmigrated into the 16-year-old body of Mo Ran.

=== Supporting ===
==== Summit of Life and Death ====
Actor	Character	Introduction
Chen Yao	Shi Mei (师昧)	Courtesy name: Shi Mingjing (师明净); Shi Mei presents herself as a kind-hearted, polite, and reasonable person who avoids conflict. She doesn't hold grudges and is often the mediator for Mo Ran and Xue Meng when they argue. However, she actually harbors a deadly secret and must ultimately decide between revenge and life as she knows it. In the novel, Shi Mei is a male character.
Zhou Qi	Xue Meng (薛蒙)	Courtesy name: Xue Ziming (薛子明); The narcissistic young master of the Summit of Life and Death who is actually responsible and kind at heart. He respects his teacher Chu Wanning deeply and dearly loves his parents, Xue Zhengyong and Madam Wang. Despite a carefree childhood, he is forced to grow up when disaster strikes his sect.
Tse Kwan-ho	Xue Zhengyong (薛正雍)	Master of the Summit of Life and Death; A kind and good-natured cultivator, he founds the Summit of Life and Death to protect the lower cultivation world from the ghost realm. He persuades Chu Wanning to join the sect after the latter leaves Rufeng Sect in disgust.
Wang Yan	Wang Chuqing (王初晴)	Mistress of the Summit of Life and Death; A former senior disciple of the Lone Moon Night sect who loses the ability to cultivate in her youth. She is married to Xue Zhengyong.

==== Rufeng Sect ====
Actor	Character	Introduction
He Zhonghua	Nangong Liu (南宫柳)	He appears to be a gentleman yet is in fact a hypocritical and ruthless leader who will sacrifice anyone for personal gain. He harbours a deep resentment toward Chu Wanning.
Cui Peng	Nangong Xu (南宫絮); Xu Shuanglin (徐霜林)	A talented cultivator, he was betrayed by his older brother Nangong Liu and is exiled from Rufeng Sect. He later returns for revenge.
Huang Haibing	Nangong Changying (南宫长英)	Founder of Rufeng Sect

== Production ==
=== Pre-production and filming ===
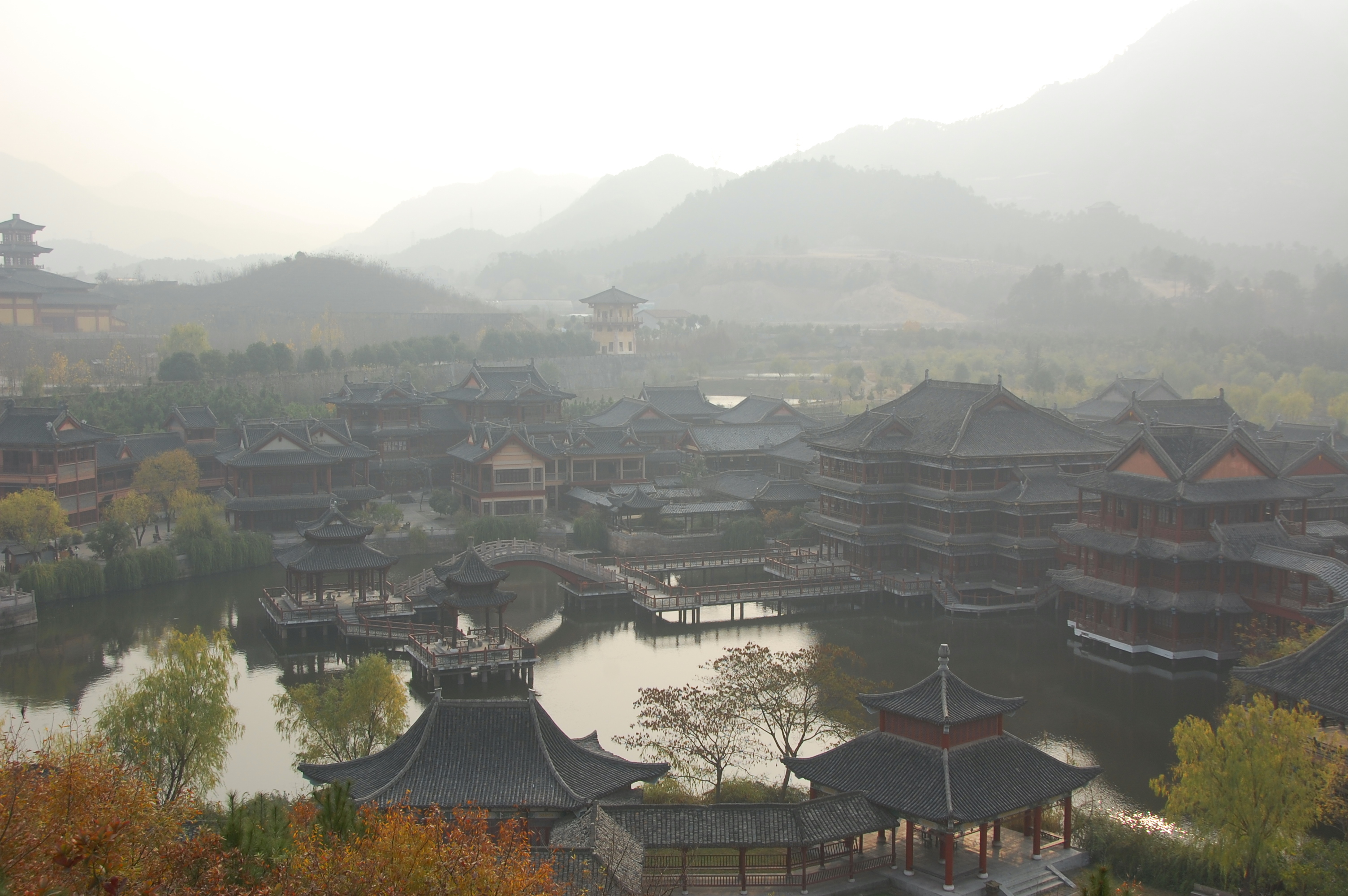
Hengdian World Studios, the main filming site of the series

On 6 January 2020, CD Home Studio released a casting call for the series, along with information on participating staff. The series is produced jointly by Tencent Penguin Pictures and Otters Studio. It is directed by He Shupei, and the main producers are credited to be Qi Shuai, Ye Fangcang, and Wang Yirong. On 8 January, it was revealed that the show had been registered with the National Radio and Television Administration.

Immortality began filming in April 2020 at Hengdian World Studios and wrapped up in September.

=== Casting ===
On 21 January 2020, Luo Yunxi and Chen Feiyu were announced as the leads.

=== Concept and design ===
A majority of the crew members, including the design team of Hua Tian, the visual effects team of TimeAxis, hair and makeup director Zeng Minghui, and still photographer Li Ruoyu worked on the 2018 fantasy romance drama Ashes of Love. Chen Xin serves as the art director of the series, while Huang Wei is in charge of costume design.

=== Release status ===
The series was expected to air on Tencent Video in April 2021, with 50 episodes. The show's broadcast schedule has not been determined, however, due to a 2021 order from the National Radio and Television Administration.

== External website ==
- Official Weibo page
