= Liang Jie (actress) =

Chinese actress

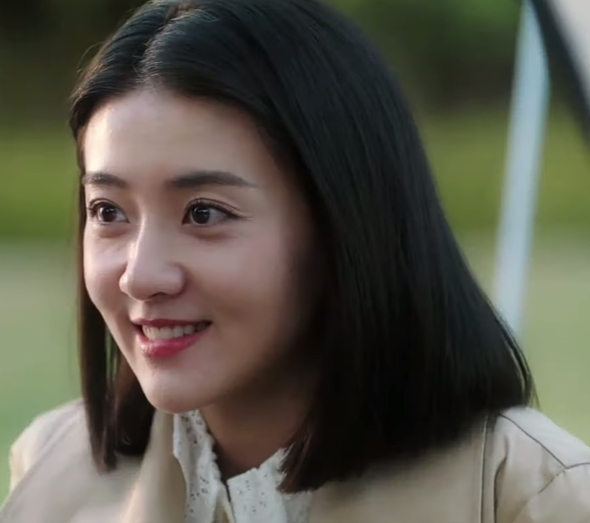
- Liang in 2021
- Born: June 16, 1994 (age 32); Shijiazhuang, Hebei, China
- Education: Central Academy of Drama
- Occupation: Actress
- Years active: 2015–present
- Agent(s): Huace Film & TV

Liang Jie (Chinese: 梁洁, born June 16, 1994) is a Chinese actress. She is best known for her roles in the dramas The Eternal Love (2017), Handsome Siblings (2020), and You Are My Destiny (2020).

== Biography ==
Liang made her acting debut in the 2016 drama Go! Goal! Fighting!.

In 2017, Liang rose to fame for her role as Qu Tan'er in the time-travel historical romance drama The Eternal Love and its sequel.

In 2020, Liang played the role of Su Ying in the wuxia drama Handsome Siblings, based on the novel Juedai Shuangjiao by Gu Long. The same year she starred in the romance drama You Are My Destiny alongside The Eternal Love co-star Xing Zhaolin, which is a remake of the 2008 Taiwanese drama Fated to Love You.

== Personal life ==
In February 2018, Liang Jie got engaged to actor Purba Rgyal. But on May 18, 2021, they had announced their peaceful breakup.

== Filmography ==
=== Television / web series ===
Year	English title	Chinese title	Role	Notes	Ref.
2015	My Name is Liu Chuan Shuo	我叫刘传说	Yue Xiaolan		
2016	Go! Goal! Fighting!	旋风十一人	Yu Yue		
2016	The Flame of Youth	尖锋之烈焰青春	Chen Yueze		
2017	Catch Wolf	擒狼	Ma Fumeng		
2017	My Girlfriend's Boyfriend	我女朋友的男朋友	Nana	Web series	
2017	The Eternal Love	双世宠妃	Qu Tan'er / Qu Xiaotan	Web series	
2018	The Eternal Love 2	双世宠妃2	Qu Tan'er / Qu Xiaotan	Web series	
2020	Handsome Siblings	绝代双骄	Su Ying		
2020	You Are My Destiny	你是我的命中注定	Chen Jiaxin		
2020	Mr. Honesty	不说谎恋人	Xu Yiren	Web series	
2021	Time Flies and You are Here	雁归西窗月	Xie Xiaoman	Web series	
2021	The Eternal Love 3	双世宠妃3	Qu Tan'er / Qu Xiaotan	Web series	
2021	The Day of Becoming You	变成你的那一天	Yu Shengsheng	Web series	
2021	The Justice	光芒	Xiao Ling Dang		
2021	Detective Kong	热血神探	Lian Haiping	Web series	
2022	To Our Dreamland Of Ice	冰雪之名	Jin Ying		
2022	Side Story of Fox Volant	飞狐外传	Yuan Ziyi	Web series	
2022	Hi Venus	我可能遇到了救星	Ye Shilan	Web series	
2024	Men in Love	请和这样的我恋爱吧	Li Xiaoxiao		
2025	The White Olive Tree	白色橄榄树	Song Ran		

== Discography ==
Year	English title	Chinese title	Album	Notes
2018	Half	一半	The Eternal Love 2 OST	
2018	Please Please	拜托拜托	The Eternal Love 2 OST	
2020	Seriously	当真	You Are My Destiny OST	Duet Xing Zhao Lin
2021	Voice / Sheng Sheng Nian	声声念	Time Flies and You are Here OST	
2021	Whisper	耳语者	The Day of Becoming You OST	Duet Cai Yi Sheng

== Awards and nominations ==
Year	Event	Category	Nominated work	Result	Ref.
2017	4th The Actors of China Awards	Best Actress (Web series)		Nominated	
2018	QQ ''The Night of Heart Appreciation''	Popular Artist of the Year	The Eternal Love	Won	
2019	6th The Actors of China Awards	Best Actress (Web series)	The Eternal Love	Nominated	
2020	Tencent Video All Star Night 2020	Promising Television Actress of the Year	You Are My Destiny	Won	
2021	5th Golden Blossom Internet Film and Television Awards 2020	Leaping Actress of the Year		Won	
