= Han Dong (actor) =

Chinese actor (born 1981)

- Born: November 11, 1981 (age 44); Hangzhou, Zhejiang, China
- Education: Central South University
- Occupation: Actor
- Years active: 2004–present
- Agent: Huace Media

Han Dong (Chinese: 韩栋; born November 11, 1981) is a Chinese actor. He rose to fame for his role as Ninth prince in the historical drama Scarlet Heart.

== Biography ==
Han was born in Xiaoshan District, Hangzhou, Zhejiang, China. He went to Central South University and majored in Civil Engineering. After graduating from college, he entered an engineering state-owned enterprise. On a holiday, Han Dong went home to accompany his friends to participate in the selection of a performing arts school. There he met the director You Xiaogang who brought Han Dong to Beijing where he started his career as an actor.

== Filmography ==
=== Film ===
Year	English title	Chinese title	Role	Notes	Ref.
2005	A Chinese Tall Story	情癫大圣	Tu Lang		
2005	Human Smoke in the Mirror	镜里人烟	Ma Ningguang		
2006	Young Xunzi	少年荀子	Tian Fazhang		
2007	The Racer	赛车手			
2007	The Dancing Girl's Passage	侠侣探案之商女梦断	Wang Keshan		
2011	The Sorcerer and the White Snake	白蛇传说	Medicine picker		
2011	East Meets West	东成西就2011	Yi Jian		
2011	Youth's Pride	青春的骄傲	Guo Jingge		
2012	Ever Loving Ocean of Blues	蓝调海之恋	Zhan Muchen		
2013	To Love God	爱神	Manager Ma		
2016	The Campus Belle's Bodyguard	校花的超级保镖之无极诀	Wu Xiang		
2019	The Campus Belle's Bodyguard 2	校花的超级保镖之异世营救	Wu Xiang		
2020	The Beauty Skin	美人皮	Qiao Sheng		
TBA	Dragon Master 3	降龙大师3			
TBA	Liao Zhai: Hua Shen Ze Fei	聊斋之花神绎妃	Song Yichen		
TBA	Liao Zhai: Big Fish	聊斋之海大鱼	Hai Dayu		
TBA	Jin Wu Cheng Zhen: Hai Shang Feng Yun	精武陈真之租界风云			
TBA	Zui Jiu Xian				

=== Television series ===
Year	English title	Chinese title	Role	Notes	Ref.
2005	Fei Chang 24 Hours	非常24小时	Le Tianqiong		
2005	Taizu Mishi	太祖秘史	He Zhili		
2005	Emergency Life	急救生活	Fang Xiaoke		
2005	Female Prosecutor Diary	女检察官手记之翻供	Xia Qingqing		
2006	The Young Warriors	少年杨家将	Bai Xu		
2006	The Legend and the Hero	封神榜之凤鸣岐山	Yang Jian		
2006	Longmen Station	龙门驿站之新嫁衣	Wang Zijun		
2007	White Valentine Dream	白色情人梦	Ma Qi		
2007	Kao Shan	靠山	Han Nianjun		
2007	Detective's Couple: The Dancing Girl Passage	侠侣探案之商女梦断	Wang Keshan		
2008	Love Strategy	恋爱兵法	Qing Wei		
2008	Li Sen Legend	李森传奇	Yun Yi		
2009	River City Order	江城令	Chang Liang		
2009	Jiangshan Yao Sai	江阴要塞	Tang Chengyu		
2009	The Legend and the Hero 2	封神榜之武王伐纣	Yang Jian		
2009	Who Understands a Woman's Heart	谁懂女儿心	Yu Dahai		
2010	Cafe	苦咖啡	Lin Lishen		
2010	Journey to the West	西游记	Reverend Jinguang		
2011	Xia Nanyang	下南洋	Kuang Zhenjia		
2011	Sanctuary	圣堂风云	Xu Yanfang		
2011	All Men Are Brothers	水浒传	Shi Jin		
2011	Scarlet Heart	步步惊心	Yin Tang		
2011	Hongchen Liying	红尘丽影	Xu Ke		
2011	Chinese Sherlock Shi	新施公案	Prince Qi'erqun		
2012	Hong Qiang Lu Wa	红墙绿瓦之残阳	Xianfeng Emperor		
2012	Cuo Dian Yuan Yang	错点鸳鸯	Shi Wuhen		
2012	In Love With Power	美人无泪			
2013	Swordsman	笑傲江湖	Tian Boguang		
2013	Love Without Promise	没有承诺的爱	Ren Jie		
2013	Legend of Lu Zhen	陆贞传奇	Li Cheng		
2013	Prince of Lan Ling	兰陵王	Yang Jian		
2013	The War For Beauties	爱情悠悠药草香	Bai Qiansheng		
2013	Earth God and Earth Grandmother	土地公土地婆	Huang Guisheng		
2013	Fall In Love	恋爱的那点事儿	Classmate Zhuo		
2013	The Demi-Gods and Semi-Devils	天龙八部	Xu Zhu		
2014	The Stand In	十月围城	Dai Feng		
2014	Sound of the Desert	风中奇缘	Li Ji		
2014	The Deer and the Cauldron	鹿鼎记	Wei Xiaobao		
2014	Shen Yi Da Gong Dao Qian Zhuan	神医大道公前传	Wu Ben		
2015	Sunflower Love				
2015	A Scholar Dream of Woman	碧血书香梦	Xuan Liji		
2015	In the Dream to Find the Answer	四手妙弹	Qi Han		
2015	Love Jewelry	爱情珠宝	Chu Yunxiang		
2015	The Four	少年四大名捕	Zhang Sheng		
2016	Chinese Paladin 5	仙剑云之凡	Xia Gulin		
2017	The Legend of the Condor Heroes	射雕英雄传	Wang Chongyang		
2017	Love, Just Come	爱，来的刚好	Duan Tianlang		
2017	Big Inn	大客栈	Lin Zhuoying		
2017	Lost Love in Times	醉玲珑	Xi Xie		
2017	Nanking Love Story	南京爱情	Gao Yingbang		
2018	The Taoism Grandmaster	玄门大师	Yang Jin		
2018	Beauties in the Closet	柜中美人	Hua Wuhuan		
2018	Hard Bone: Desperate Way To Return	硬骨头之绝地归途	Wen Long		
2019	Please Give Me a Pair of Wings	请赐我一双翅膀	Leng Liwei		
2019	Under The Power	锦衣之下	Yan Shifan		
2020	Court Battle	决胜法庭	Tie Li		
2020	Autumn Cicada	秋蝉	Yu Ying	Cameo	
2020	Sai Shang Feng Yun Ji	塞上风云记	Lu Junjie		
2020	Dance of the Sky Empire	天舞纪	Shi Xingyu	Cameo	
2020	The Promise of Chang'an	长安诺	Xiao Chengrui		
2023	The Longest Promise	玉骨谣	Da Siming		
2025	Legend of The Female General	锦月如歌	Liu Buwang		
TBA	Tian Si Chuan	填四川	Yongzheng		
TBA	Our Little Secret	我们的秘密	An Mingbei		
TBA	Missing You Everyday	天天想你 (闺蜜的心事)	Song Ting		
TBA	Beauty Water	整容液			
TBA	Peace in Palace, Peace in Chang'an	天下长安	Li Jiancheng		
TBA	The Nest	蜂巢	Luo Mingxing		
TBA	Jin Wu Wei	金吾卫之天魔鬼畜	Tang Xuanzong		
TBA	Qing Qing Zi Jin	青青子衿	Zhou Meng		
TBA	Yu Zhao Ling	玉昭令	Yang Jian		
TBA	Meng Xing Chang An	梦醒长安	Prince Guang		

== Awards and nominations ==
Year	Award	Category	Nominated work	Results	Ref.
2013	2nd Fashion New Power Award	Most Popular Actor	—N/a	Won	
2015	2nd Hengdian Film and TV Festival of China	Best Supporting Actor	Sound of the Desert	Won	
2018	2nd City Star Drama Awards	Best Actor	—N/a	Won	
