= Bai Lu (actress) =

Chinese actress (born 1994)

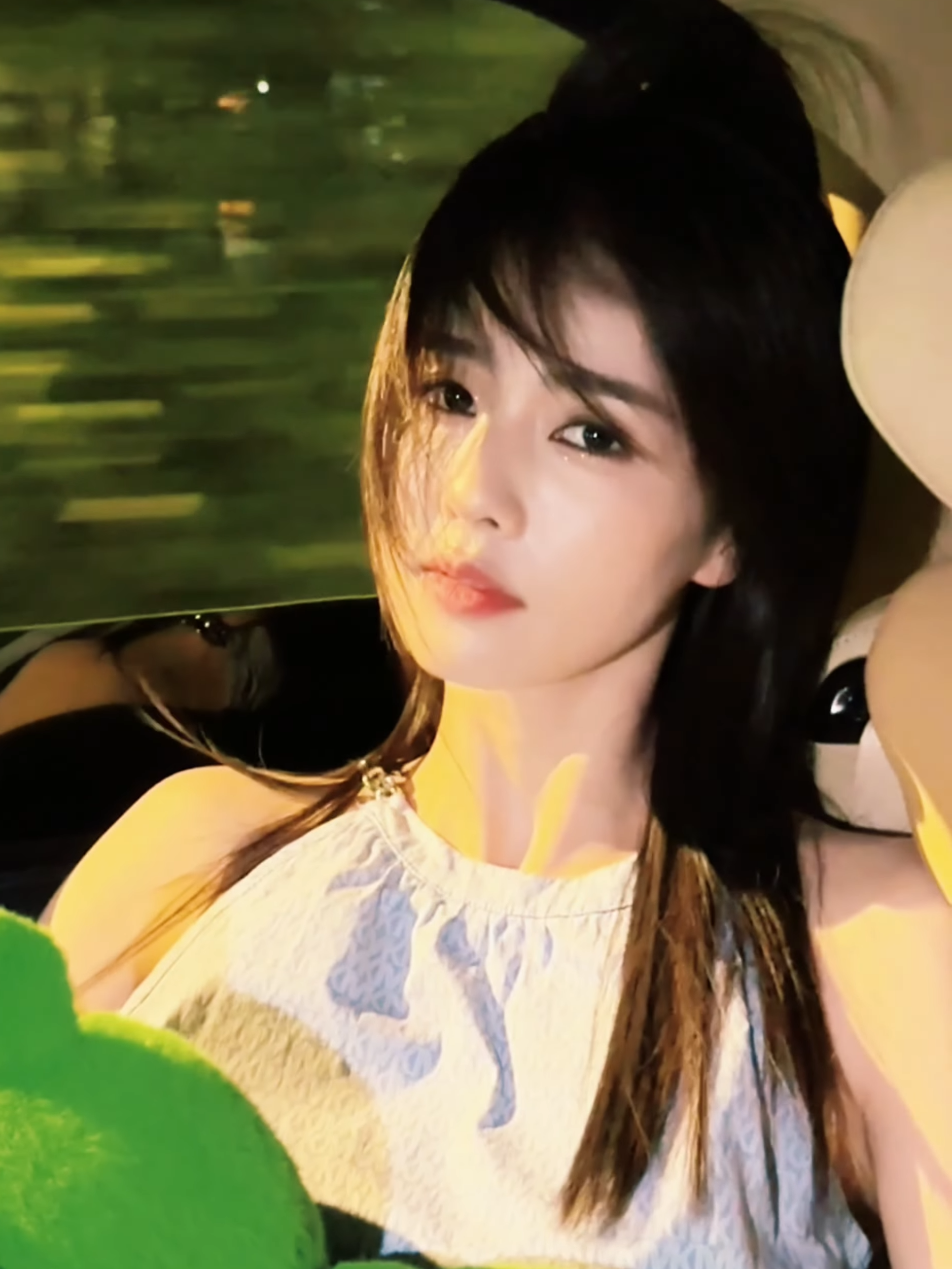
- Bai Lu in 2023
- Born: Bai Mengyan (白梦妍); 23 September 1994 (age 32); Changzhou, Jiangsu, China
- Education: Changzhou Technical Institute of Tourism and Commerce
- Occupations: Actress; model; singer
- Years active: 2016–present

Chinese name
- Chinese: 白鹿
- Literal meaning: White deer
Transcriptions
Standard Mandarin
- Hanyu Pinyin: Bái lù

Bai Mengyan (Chinese: 白梦妍; pinyin: Bái mèng yán; born 23 September 1994), known professionally by her stage name Bai Lu (Chinese: 白鹿), is a Chinese actress, model and singer, best known for her roles in Untouchable Lovers (2018), The Legends (2019), Arsenal Military Academy (2019), Love Is Sweet (2020), One and Only (2021), Forever and Ever (2021), Story of Kunning Palace (2023), Only for Love (2023), Till the End of the Moon (2023), and Feud (2025).

== Early life ==
Bai Lu was born Bai Mengyan on 23 September 1994, in Changzhou, Jiangsu. In 2010, she enrolled in the Foreign Language degree program at Changzhou Higher Vocational Technical Institute of Tourism and Commerce. In 2015, she graduated, and began working as a model in graphic advertisement for Taobao.

== Career ==
=== 2012–2018: Career beginnings ===
In 2012, Bai Lu participated in SM Entertainment's overseas audition, but was unsuccessful. In 2015, she shot a short film for a literary magazine, and later appeared on its cover. She then began pursuing her career as an actress, starting with the short film Meeting You Is Such a Good Thing, produced by Cat's Tree Studio. She acted in several other short films before signing in 2016 with Yu Zheng's entertainment company, Huanyu Film.

Bai acted in her first television series in 2016 with Zhaoge, playing a noble lady. The following year, Bai landed two starring roles, one as the lead in the historical comedy series King Is Not Easy and as the lead in the fantasy drama The Monkey King: Land of Beauty. In 2018, Bai starred in the historical romance drama Untouchable Lovers, playing dual roles as the general Hou Xuan and as the prince's concubine Le Yun. For her performance in the series, she won the "Best Newcomer Award" at the iQiyi All-Star Carnival.

=== 2019–2022: Rising popularity and breakthrough ===
In 2019, Bai starred as a demon leader in the xianxia drama The Legends alongside Xu Kai. The series topped television broadcasting ratings, with critics praising its strong female characters and the acting of Bai and Xu. She starred as a girl pretending to be her brother in the youth military-based series Arsenal Military Academy. The series received positive responses and Bai won Best Actress Awards for her portrayal. Later that year, she starred in the romance comedy series Lucky's First Love.

Bai starred in the 2020 workplace romance series Love Is Sweet, playing an idealistic but intelligent financial analyst. This series was Bai's first working alongside Luo Yunxi (three years later, they would pair up again in Till the End of the Moon). Love Is Sweet was one of Bai's first to earn recognition in the international market. Later that year, Bai starred in the historical romance series Jiu Liu Overlord alongside Lai Yi.

The following year, Bai starred as in the 2021 Chinese period romantic series One and Only with Ren Jialun. Critics praised the series' gripping romance story and superior production quality, and the series topped popularity rankings on Chinese and international social media with over eight million searches. A sequel of One and Only, named Forever and Ever, was released later that year. Additionally, Bai starred in the 2022 police series Ordinary Greatness.

=== 2023–present: Mainstream success ===
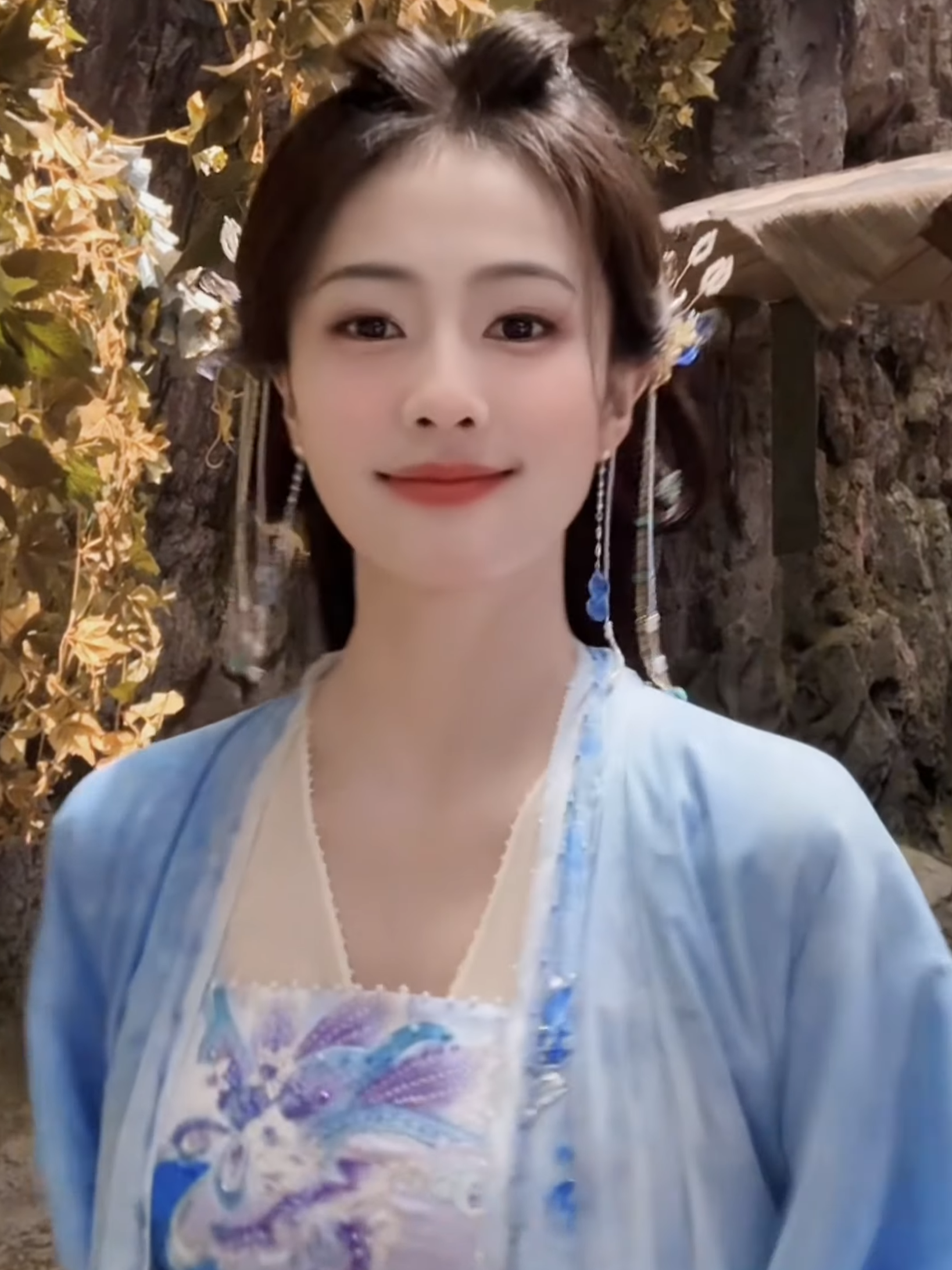
Bai Lu on the set of Story of Kunning Palace in 2024

Bai gained international recognition and acclaim following the release of historical fantasy series Till the End of the Moon in April 2023. This was her second time starring alongside Luo Yunxi. This series shattered records; following its premiere on Youku, it became the most-watched title on the platform since 2020. In addition to China, the show was broadcast in South Korea, Hong Kong, Thailand, Taiwan, and Malaysia. Netflix picked up the show for international distribution, making the film available for audiences in the United States, Europe, and Oceania.

In November 2023, Bai starred in the historical drama Story of Kunning Palace with Zhang Linghe. This drama broke the hit index 10,000 of the IQIYI, becoming the first female-centric drama to achieve that milestone in 2023. At the same time in November 2023 on Mango TV, she starred in the urban romance drama Only for Love with Wang Hedi. It was a commercial hit in terms of viewership and acting chemistry.

In January 2025, Bai starred in Moonlight Mystique with Ao Ruipeng, a fantasy xianxia romance drama series focused on a mortal general's daughter who embarks on a quest to cultivate immortality and repay a life-saving debt. It was widely recognized by both fans and critics for its balance between grandeur and intimacy with strong performances and visual appeal from the main and supporting cast's narratives.

In March 2025, Bai starred in Northward with Ou Hao, a drama series focused on the lives of children who grew up along the Grand Canal. It was widely praised for her portrayal of daily life and versatility in delivery of acting where both the character and struggling emotions were brought to life.

In June 2025, Bai starred in Feud with Zeng Shunxi, a fantasy xianxia romance drama series that follows two powerful immortals who reconcile after a tragic past and unite to fight a looming disaster. It was one of the top Chinese dramas of 2025 in terms of viewership and widely praised for breaking away from traditional fantasy romance tropes with an innovative plot centered around "three marriages and three separations," creating a uniquely intense "love-hate" dynamic.

In February 2026, Bai starred in Unveil: Jadewind with Wang Xingyue, a historical mystery and investigation drama set in the Tang Dynasty where they solve bizarre palace crimes while unravelling a deep conspiracy tied to a tragic family massacre from their past. In June 2026, Bai starred in The First Jasmine with Cheng Lei, a historical political romance drama that follows an arranged marriage where the two traumatized individuals slowly build a powerful partnership while seeking revenge against political conspirators.

On June 24th, 2026, she partnered with Warner Music China to release a EP Kaleidoscope with three songs Kaleidoscope Dream, Invisible Lovers, and Colored by Your Light. It attracted over 100k listeners and occupied the top spots on the daily charts of major Chinese music platforms. On June 27th, 2026, she hosted her 10th debut anniversary concert at Suzhou Olympic Sports Centre.

On July 15th, 2026, she announced her departure from Yu Zheng's Huanyu Entertainment after 10 years with a farewell message and established her own studio.

== Endorsements ==
Bai Lu has partnered and served as the brand ambassador for a wide variety of national and international brands. She partnered with local Chinese brands, including Hourglass, Amortal, Revivo, Wasado, Florasis, Pony, and Swisse Milk,. Internationally, she has partnered with both Olay and Sergio Rossi. She was named the brand ambassador for a Michael Kors jewelry wristwatch collection and for Chopard. She is the brand ambassador for Allie and for Changqing Yogurt drink. In 2026, Bai was promoted to be both the global brand ambassador of Jimmy Choo and the face of its fragrance portfolio, a step up from her previous position as their Asia-Pacific brand ambassador. On September 20, she was named WeTV Global Ambassador.

== Public image ==
Bai Lu tops the "2022 Most Improved Celebrity" in commercial value rankings. She features in the "Top 10 Most Popular Drama Artist" and in "Top 10 Most Beautiful Chinese Actress 2023". As of April 2023, she had 20 million followers on Weibo. As of May 2026, she had 3 million followers on Instagram.

== Filmography ==
=== Short films ===
Year	English title	Chinese title	Ref.
2015	Meeting You is Such a Good Thing	遇见你这么美好的事情	
2016	There are No Jokes in this World	世界上没有所谓的玩笑，玩笑都有认真的成分	
2016	This Winter, Have You Fell in Love?	这个冬天，你恋爱了吗	
2016	What Do You Expect of Me	你还要我怎样	

=== Television series ===
Year	English title	Chinese title	Role	Ref.
2017	King is Not Easy	大王不容易	Da Xi	
2018	Untouchable Lovers	凤囚凰	Wang Xiaoqian / Han Xiao	
2019	The Legends	招摇	Lu Zhaoyao	
2022	Ordinary Greatness	警察荣誉	Xia Jie	
2023	Only For Love	以爱为营	Zheng Shuyi	
2025	Northward	北上	Xia Fenghua	
2027	The Last Bloom Fades	开到荼蘼	Wang Yunna	

=== Web series ===
Year	English title	Chinese title	Role	Notes	Ref.
2019	Arsenal Military Academy	烈火军校	Xie Xiang / Xie Liangchen		
2019	Lucky's First Love	世界欠我一个初恋	Xing Yun		
2020	Love Is Sweet	半是蜜糖半是伤	Jiang Jun		
2020	Jiu Liu Overlord	九流霸主	Long Aoyi		
2021	Song of Youth	玉楼春	Lin Shaochun		
2021	One and Only	周生如故	Cui Shiyi		
2021	Forever and Ever	一生一世	Shi Yi		
2021	Ace Troops	王牌部队	Hu Yang	Cameo (Ep.1, 13, 34)	
2023	Till the End of the Moon	长月烬明	Li Susu / Ye Xiwu / Sang Jiu		
2023	Story of Kunning Palace	宁安如梦	Jiang Xuening		
2025	Moonlight Mystique	白月梵星	Bai Shuo / Xing Yue		
2025	Feud	临江仙	Li Qingyue / Hua Ruyue		
2026	Unveil: Jadewind	唐宫奇案之青雾风鸣	Li Peiyi		
2026	The First Jasmine	莫离	Ye Li		

=== Television shows ===
Year	English title	Chinese title	Role	Ref.
2021	Keep Running (Yellow River 2)	奔跑吧黄河篇2	Resident MC	
2021	Have Fun (Season 1, episode 9)	嗨放派	Resident MC	
2022	Keep Running (Season 10)	奔跑吧10	Resident MC	
2022	Keep Running (Let's Build A Better Life)	奔跑吧共同富裕篇	Resident MC	
2023	Keep Running (Season 11)	奔跑吧11	Resident MC	
2023	1 Million Promises	100万个约定	Herself	

=== Music video appearances ===
Year	English title	Chinese title	Artist	Notes	Ref.
2016	"Message"	留言	Rover Lu		
2021	"Dance of the Youth"	青春舞曲		To commemorate the 100th Anniversary of the Chinese Communist Party	

== Discography ==
=== Singles ===
Year	English title	Chinese title	Album	Ref.
2017	"Subordinate Takes Order"	小的听令	King is Not Easy OST	
2018	"A Tale of Two Phoenixes"	凤囚凰	Untouchable Lovers OST	
2019	"Entering a Dream" (with Xu Kai)	入梦	Arsenal Military Academy OST	
2019	"Want to be with You"	想和你一起\	Lucky's First Love OST	
2021	"Heartbeat"	心动	Forever and Ever OST	
2021	"My Sugar"		Bai Lu Debut 5th Year Anniversary Birthday Single	
2022	"Floating Universe"	漂浮宇宙	Non-album singles	
2022	"Did You See a Little Deer"	你有没有看见一只小鹿	Non-album singles	

== Awards and nominations ==
Year	Award	Ceremony	Nominated work	Results	Ref.
2017	11th Tencent Video Star Awards	Most Promising New Actress	King is Not Easy	Won	
2018	7th iQIYI All-Star Carnival	Newcomer Award	Untouchable Lovers	Won	
2019	6th The Actors of China Award Ceremony	Best Actress (Web series)	Arsenal Military Academy	Nominated	
2019	StarHub Night of Stars 2019	Most Promising Actress	Arsenal Military Academy	Won	
2019	Golden Bud - The Fourth Network Film And Television Festival	Best Actress	The Legends, Arsenal Military Academy, Lucky's First Love	Nominated	
2019	8th iQIYI All-Star Carnival	Most Popular Actress	Arsenal Military Academy	Won	
2019	Weibo TV Series Awards	Top 10 Popular Actresses	The Legends, Arsenal Military Academy, Lucky's First Love	Won	
2019	Today Headline News Award	New Female Star of the Year	—N/a	Won	
2020	7th The Actors of China Award Ceremony	Best Actress (Web series)	—N/a	Nominated	
2020	2021 iQIYI Scream Night	Popular Actress of the Year	Love Is Sweet	Won	
2021	8th Wen Rong Awards	Best Youth Actress	Forever and Ever	Nominated	
2021	iQIYI Q Awards 2021	Most Popular Actress	One and Only	Won	
2021	34th Huading Awards	Best Actress	One and Only	Nominated	
2022	7th Global Diplomats' Chinese Culture Night	Most Popular Young Actress	—N/a	Won	
2022	Golden Bud - The Sixth Network Film And Television Festival	Most Popular Actress	One and Only, Forever and Ever, Song of Youth, Ace Troops	Won	
2022	Chinese American TV Festival - Golden Angel Awards	Outstanding Actress of the Year	Forever and Ever	Won	
2023	2023 Weibo Night	Most Paid Attention Artist	—N/a	Won	
