= Ren Jialun =

Chinese actor and singer

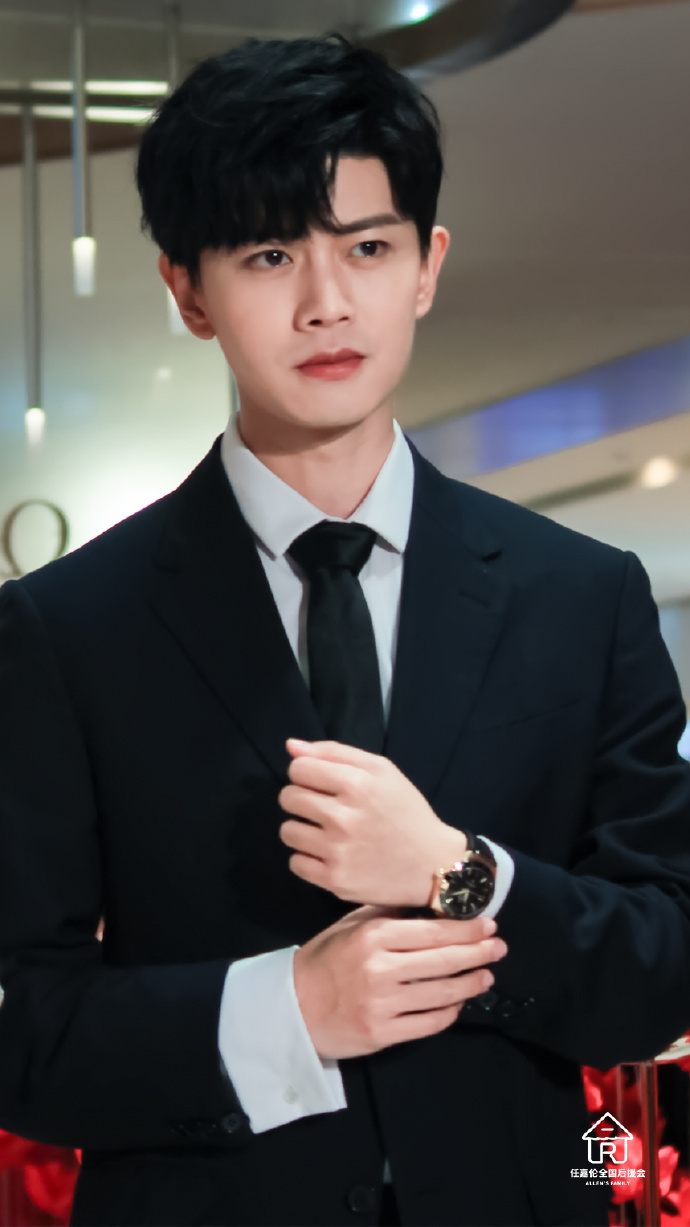
- Ren in July 2021
- Born: Ren Guochao (任国超） 11 April 1989 (age 37); Qingdao, Shandong, China
- Other name: Allen Ren
- Occupations: Actor; singer; dancer; model
- Years active: 2014–present

Ren Jialun (Chinese: 任嘉伦; born Ren Guochao on 11 April 1989), also known as Allen Ren, is a Chinese actor and singer. Ren representative dramas include: The Glory of Tang Dynasty (2017), Under the Power (2019), Autumn Cicada (2020), One and Only (2021), Forever and Ever (2021), Thousand Years for You (2022), Love of Nirvana (2024), The Demon Hunter's Romance (2025), Silent Tides (2025), Fate Chooses You (2026).

== Biography ==
Ren was born in Qingdao, Shandong. His talent as a child was reflected in table tennis. He started playing at the age of 6 and was selected to the Shandong provincial team at the age of 13 due to his outstanding performance. Ren was a professional table tennis player, who trained alongside Zhou Yu and Zhang Jike. However, he had to quit the sport due to injuries.

After graduating from high school, Ren worked in airport ground handling and flight attendant work at Qingdao Liuting International Airport. Because of hard work and conscientious training, the airport and its alma mater issued an advocacy of "learning the work spirit of Ren Guochao". He also uses his spare time to learn to sing and dance, to chase and practice his dreams. In 2008, he began to participate in various draft competitions to exercise himself. Later, he won the support of his family and officially resigned from the airport, opening another road of life.

Prior to beginning his acting career, Ren participated in Hunan TV's Super Boy and Korean Star. He was originally planned to debut in a Chinese-South Korean boy group, but quit in 2014 for unknown reasons.

== Career ==
In 2014, Ren filmed his first television drama Detective Dee, where he played the leading role of Di Renjie. The drama was delayed and only aired in 2017. In 2016, Ren featured in the fantasy action drama Noble Aspirations and crime drama Memory Lost.

Ren rose to fame in 2017, after starring in the historical drama The Glory of Tang Dynasty. His portrayal of Li Chu left a deep impression on audiences, and he received rave reviews for his acting. He received the Best Actor award at the 4th Hengdian Film and TV Festival of China.

In 2018, Ren starred in the fantasy romance drama The Destiny of White Snake, based on the renowned Chinese folktale, playing Xu Xian.

In 2019, Ren starred in the wuxia drama Under The Power.

In 2020, Ren starred in the republican spy drama Autumn Cicada.

In 2021, Ren starred in the Chinese drama Miss Crow with Mr Lizard alongside Xing Fei, as his Co-star. The drama received many positive reviews in Asia and all worldwide. Ren also starred in One and Only and its sequel, Forever and Ever with Bai Lu as his Co star, which making both very popular recently. In the same year, he was cast in the drama Twilight alongside Angelababy. In addition to his acting career, Ren also pursued music projects under Catwalk Entertainment, with his solo albums released by record label Seed Music. He made his official debut as a recording artist with the studio album *Thirty-Two · Rise* on April 11, 2021, followed by *33* in December 2022. His third studio album, *36 · Begin*, was released on April 11, 2025. All albums were issued in both digital and physical formats.

In 2022, Ren starred with Dilraba Dilmurat in The Blue Whisper, a fantasy romance drama. And a newly broadcast fantasy Republican Era drama, Thousand Years For You where Ren starred with Li Qin.

== Personal life ==
=== Real name anecdote ===
Ren Jialun's real name is Ren Guochao. Because of his down-to-earth name, he once became the first artist to top Weibo's hot search due to "failure to change his name".

Ren Guochao is not the only hidden name of Ren Jialun. He is most famous for the fact that one person can form the "RGC411 Heavenly Group". This group is composed of his multi-oriented former names, and one of the representatives of the group is Ren Yaoxi, who can sing and dance well. This name is derived from when Ren Jialun went to Japan for development, because the word "good" in Japan is "yaoxi", which is homonym for "Yaoxi" and has the meaning of shining star.

=== Marriage ===
On 7 March 2017, after Ren achieved mainstream success with The Glory of Tang Dynasty, Ren announced on Weibo that he was in a long-term relationship with his girlfriend of five years, Nie Huan. On 2 February 2018, Ren announced on Weibo that he had become a father.

=== Guochao anthology ===
From 2007 to 2009, Ren wrote down his thoughts and thoughts about life on his blog. After gradually gaining attention, they were collected and compiled into an autobiography called Guo Chao Collection.

== Filmography ==
=== Television series ===
Year	English title	Chinese title	Role	Network	Notes/Ref.
2016	Noble Aspirations	青云志	Liu Wei	Hunan TV	Cameo
2016	Memory Lost	美人为馅	Zhang Muhan	iQiyi	
2017	The Glory of Tang Dynasty	大唐荣耀	Li Chu	Anhui TV, Beijing TV	
2017	Legend of Dragon Pearl	龙珠传奇	Li Si Xing	Anhui TV, Beijing TV	Cameo
2017	Detective Dee	通天狄仁傑	Di Renjie	Anhui TV	
2018	The Destiny of White Snake	天乩之白蛇傳說	Zi Xuan / Xu Xuan	iQiyi	
2019	The Lost Tomb II: Explore with the Note	盗墓笔记II: 怒海潜沙	Xiao Yu	Tencent	Cameo
2019	Under The Power	锦衣之下	Lu Yi	iQiyi, Mango TV	
2020	Autumn Cicada	秋蝉	Ye Chong	Jiangsu TV, Zhejiang TV	
2020	Love a Lifetime	慕白首	Nalan Yue / Lin Jing	iQiyi, Youku	
2021	Miss Crow with Mr. Lizard	乌鸦小姐与蜥蜴先生	Gu Chuan	Tencent	
2021	Never Say Goodbye	不说再见	Mu Qing / Liu Yuan Wen	iQiyi	
2021	One and Only	周生如故	ZhouSheng Chen	iQiyi	
2021	Forever and Ever	一生一世	ZhouSheng Chen	iQiyi	
2022	The Blue Whisper	驭鲛记之与君初相识 . 恰似故人归	Chang Yi	Youku	
2022	Blue Flame Assault	蓝焰突击	Li Xi Cheng	Youku, JSTV	
2022	Thousand Years For You	请君	Lu Yan	iQiyi	
2023	Heart / Twilight	暮色心约	Qi Lian Shan / Luo Cheng / Gu Xu Yang / Zhen Hai	Tencent	
2024	Burning Flames	烈焰	Wu Geng / A Gou	Tencent, iQiyi	
2024	Love of Nirvana	流水迢迢	Xiao Wu Xia / Wei Zhao	iQiyi, Tencent	
2025	The Demon Hunter's Romance	无忧渡	Jiu Xuan Ye / Man Ying	iQiyi	
2025	Love and Crown	凤凰台上	Xiao Huan / Bai Chi Fan	Youku	
2025	Silent Tides	风与潮	He Xian	iQiyi	
2026	Fate Chooses You	佳偶天成	Lu Qian Qiao / Lu Huai	iQiyi	
TBA	Abyss	深渊	Li Cheng	IQiyi	

=== Variety shows ===
Year	Title	Role	Ref.
2018	Super Penguin League; Season:1	Initiator; Live Basketball Competition	
2021	Have Fun	Regular Member	
2022	Have Fun Season 2	Regular Member	
2024	Have Fun Season 3	Regular Member	

== Discography ==
=== Album ===
Album No.	Album Title	Album Information	Tracklist	Producer	Lyricist	Notes
1st	Thirty-Two·Rise (三十二·立)	Debut solo album: Release date: April 11, 2021; Record label:Seed Music (種子音樂); Release format: Digital & Physical album; Number of tracks: 10; Title Song: “立”	Intro			
1st	Thirty-Two·Rise (三十二·立)	Debut solo album: Release date: April 11, 2021; Record label:Seed Music (種子音樂); Release format: Digital & Physical album; Number of tracks: 10; Title Song: “立”	立			
1st	Thirty-Two·Rise (三十二·立)	Debut solo album: Release date: April 11, 2021; Record label:Seed Music (種子音樂); Release format: Digital & Physical album; Number of tracks: 10; Title Song: “立”	Drown in love			
1st	Thirty-Two·Rise (三十二·立)	Debut solo album: Release date: April 11, 2021; Record label:Seed Music (種子音樂); Release format: Digital & Physical album; Number of tracks: 10; Title Song: “立”	Who			
1st	Thirty-Two·Rise (三十二·立)	Debut solo album: Release date: April 11, 2021; Record label:Seed Music (種子音樂); Release format: Digital & Physical album; Number of tracks: 10; Title Song: “立”	鑽石			
1st	Thirty-Two·Rise (三十二·立)	Debut solo album: Release date: April 11, 2021; Record label:Seed Music (種子音樂); Release format: Digital & Physical album; Number of tracks: 10; Title Song: “立”	專屬契約		✔	Lyricist：Tang Tian (songwriter)
1st	Thirty-Two·Rise (三十二·立)	Debut solo album: Release date: April 11, 2021; Record label:Seed Music (種子音樂); Release format: Digital & Physical album; Number of tracks: 10; Title Song: “立”	我是你的歌手			
1st	Thirty-Two·Rise (三十二·立)	Debut solo album: Release date: April 11, 2021; Record label:Seed Music (種子音樂); Release format: Digital & Physical album; Number of tracks: 10; Title Song: “立”	夕陽			
1st	Thirty-Two·Rise (三十二·立)	Debut solo album: Release date: April 11, 2021; Record label:Seed Music (種子音樂); Release format: Digital & Physical album; Number of tracks: 10; Title Song: “立”	他		✔	
1st	Thirty-Two·Rise (三十二·立)	Debut solo album: Release date: April 11, 2021; Record label:Seed Music (種子音樂); Release format: Digital & Physical album; Number of tracks: 10; Title Song: “立”	少年如你			
2nd	33	Second solo album: Release date: December 17, 2022; Record label: Seed Music (種子音樂); Release format: Digital & Physical album; Number of tracks: 7; Title Song: “無愧”	無愧			
2nd	33	Second solo album: Release date: December 17, 2022; Record label: Seed Music (種子音樂); Release format: Digital & Physical album; Number of tracks: 7; Title Song: “無愧”	無界			
2nd	33	Second solo album: Release date: December 17, 2022; Record label: Seed Music (種子音樂); Release format: Digital & Physical album; Number of tracks: 7; Title Song: “無愧”	Fresh Boy			和聲
2nd	33	Second solo album: Release date: December 17, 2022; Record label: Seed Music (種子音樂); Release format: Digital & Physical album; Number of tracks: 7; Title Song: “無愧”	樂光			
2nd	33	Second solo album: Release date: December 17, 2022; Record label: Seed Music (種子音樂); Release format: Digital & Physical album; Number of tracks: 7; Title Song: “無愧”	未公開備忘錄		✔	
2nd	33	Second solo album: Release date: December 17, 2022; Record label: Seed Music (種子音樂); Release format: Digital & Physical album; Number of tracks: 7; Title Song: “無愧”	一鏡到底			Lyricist：Vincent Fang (lyricist)
2nd	33	Second solo album: Release date: December 17, 2022; Record label: Seed Music (種子音樂); Release format: Digital & Physical album; Number of tracks: 7; Title Song: “無愧”	忘記冒險			Composer / Producer：Lay Zhang
3rd	36・Start (36・啟)	Third solo album: Release date: April 11, 2025; Record label: Seed Music (種子音樂); Release format: Digital & Physical album; Number of tracks: 7; Title Song: “月球俱乐部”, “爭分奪秒”	Intro			
3rd	36・Start (36・啟)	Third solo album: Release date: April 11, 2025; Record label: Seed Music (種子音樂); Release format: Digital & Physical album; Number of tracks: 7; Title Song: “月球俱乐部”, “爭分奪秒”	月球俱樂部	✔		
3rd	36・Start (36・啟)	Third solo album: Release date: April 11, 2025; Record label: Seed Music (種子音樂); Release format: Digital & Physical album; Number of tracks: 7; Title Song: “月球俱乐部”, “爭分奪秒”	爭分奪秒	✔		
3rd	36・Start (36・啟)	Third solo album: Release date: April 11, 2025; Record label: Seed Music (種子音樂); Release format: Digital & Physical album; Number of tracks: 7; Title Song: “月球俱乐部”, “爭分奪秒”	銀河狂歡			Backing vocals
3rd	36・Start (36・啟)	Third solo album: Release date: April 11, 2025; Record label: Seed Music (種子音樂); Release format: Digital & Physical album; Number of tracks: 7; Title Song: “月球俱乐部”, “爭分奪秒”	淪陷			
3rd	36・Start (36・啟)	Third solo album: Release date: April 11, 2025; Record label: Seed Music (種子音樂); Release format: Digital & Physical album; Number of tracks: 7; Title Song: “月球俱乐部”, “爭分奪秒”	第五維度			Backing vocals
3rd	36・Start (36・啟)	Third solo album: Release date: April 11, 2025; Record label: Seed Music (種子音樂); Release format: Digital & Physical album; Number of tracks: 7; Title Song: “月球俱乐部”, “爭分奪秒”	Y.a.Y			

=== Soundtrack appearances ===
Year	English title	Chinese title	Album	Notes/Ref.
2017	"Glory"	荣耀	The Glory of Tang Dynasty OST	
2018	"Dreamers Never Sleep"			
2019	"Cloud"	浮雲		
2019	"Heart Wall"	心墙	Under the Power OST	
2020	"Split Identity"	分身	Autumn Cicada OST	
2020	"Death Words"	逝言	Love a Lifetime OST	
2021	"As One"	如一	One and Only OST	
2022	"I"	吾	Thousand Years for You OST	
2024	"Don't Ask Why"	不问故	Burning Flames OST	

== Awards and nominations ==
Year	Award	Category	Nominated work	Result	Ref.
2017	4th Hengdian Film and TV Festival of China	Best Actor	The Glory of Tang Dynasty	Won	
2018	Golden Data Entertainment Award	Most Commercially Valuable Actor	—N/a	Won	
2019	Sina Fashion Awards	Vibrant Artist of the Year	—N/a	Won	
2020	7th The Actors of China Award Ceremony	Best Actor (Emerald)	—N/a	Nominated	
2020	30th China TV Golden Eagle Award	Audience's Choice for Actor	—N/a	Nominated	
2020	29th Huading Award	Best Actor	Under the Power	Nominated	
2020	iQIYI Scream Night	Charm Actor of the Year	Under the Power	Won	
2020	29th Heading Award	Best Performance by an Actor in an Ancient Television Series	Under the Power	Nominated	
2020	The Actor of China	Best Performance by an Actor-green Team	Under the Power	Nominated	
2021	iQIYI Q Award 2021	Most Influential Actor	One and Only	Won	
2021	30th Huading Award	Audience's Favourite TV Actor	One and Only	Won	
2021	30th Huading Award	Best Actor in a Television series	One and Only	Nominated	
2021	30th Huading Award	Best Performance by an Actor in an Ancient Television Series	One and Only	Nominated	
2022	Chinese American TV Festival – Golden Angel Awards	Best Young Actor	Forever and Ever	Won	
2023	iQIYI Scream Night	Asia-Pacific Outstanding Actor of the Year	—N/a	Won	
2023	Asian Academy Creative Award	Best Actor in a Leading Role	Thousand Years for You	Won	
2024	Weibo TV & Internet Video Summit	Outstanding Actor of the Year	—N/a	Won	
2024	Tencent Video TV And Movie Award	Quality Artist of the Year	Love of Nirvana	Won	
2024	Tencent Video TV And Movie Award	VIP Star of the Year	—N/a	Won	
2024	Sohu Fashion Awards	Most Competent Artist of the Year	—N/a	Won	
2024	Sohu Fashion Awards	Fashion Influential Artist of the Year	—N/a	Won	
2025	Weibo Competition Night	Cross-Sports Influential Figure of the Year	—N/a	Won	
2025	Weibo Cultural Exchange Night	Outstanding Charity Figure Honor	—N/a	Won	
2025	China TV Drama Awards	Most Popular Actor of the Year	—N/a	Won	
2025	iQIYI Screaming Night	2026 Audience-Focused Actor of the Year	—N/a	Won	
