= Xing Zhaolin =

Chinese actor

- Born: 22 July 1997 (age 29); Jinshui District, Henan, China
- Occupations: Actor; model; singer
- Years active: 2015–present
- Agent: Tongle Entertainment (童乐影视)

Chinese name
- Simplified Chinese: 邢昭林
Transcriptions
Standard Mandarin
- Hanyu Pinyin: Xíng Zhāolín

Xing Zhaolin (Chinese: 邢昭林, born 22 July 1997) is a Chinese actor, model and singer. He is best known for his roles as Yue Qi in Princess Agents and Mo Liancheng in The Eternal Love.

== Filmography ==
=== Film ===
Year	English title	Chinese title	Role	Notes/Ref.
2015	20 Once Again	重返20岁	Band member	

=== Television series ===
Year	English title	Chinese title	Role	Notes/Ref.
2016	Magical Space-time	奇妙的时光之旅	Band singer	
2016	Sword Chaos	刀剑缭乱	Ba Wangqiang	
2017	Princess Agents	楚喬傳	Yue Qi	
2017	The Eternal Love	双世宠妃	Mo Liancheng	
2017	I Cannot Hug You	无法拥抱的你	Jiang Zhihao	
2018	I Cannot Hug You 2	无法拥抱的你2	Jiang Zhihao	
2018	The Eternal Love 2	双世宠妃2	Mo Liancheng	
2019	Blowing in the Wind	强风吹拂	Xia Di	
2019	Lucky's First Love	世界欠我一个初恋	Xia Ke	
2019	Standing in the Time	不负时光	Zhou Zimo	
2020	You Are My Destiny	你是我的命中注定	Wang Xiyi	
2020	Marry Me	三嫁惹君心	Long Yao	
2021	Cute Programmer	程序员那么可爱	Jiang Yicheng	
2021	Accidentally Meow On You	一不小心喵上你	Ji Chen	
2021	The Eternal Love 3	双世宠妃3	Mo Liancheng	
TBA	The Unknown: Legend of Exorcist Zhong Kui	问天录之少年钟馗	Zhong Yunfei	
TBA	Choice Husband	择君记	Pei Yan Zhen	

== Discography ==
Year	English title	Chinese title	Album	Notes
2019	"The Whole World's Secrets"	全世界的秘密	Blowing In The Wind OST	with Eleanor Lee
2019	"First Love"	初恋	Lucky's First Love OST	
2020	"For Real"	当真	You Are My Destiny OST	with Liang Jie

== Awards and nominations ==
Year	Event	Category	Nominated work	Result	Ref.
2017	11th Tencent Video Star Awards	Most Promising Actor	The Eternal Love	Won	
2019	6th The Actors of China Award Ceremony	Best Actor (Web series)	The Eternal Love	Won	
2019	Golden Bud - The Fourth Network Film And Television Festival	Best Actor	Blowing in the Wind, Brilliant Time, Lucky's First Love	Nominated	
2019	Golden Bud - The Fourth Network Film And Television Festival	Rising Actor of the Year	Blowing in the Wind, Brilliant Time, Lucky's First Love	Won	
