= Hong Yao =

Chinese actor

- 洪尧
- Born: March 19, 1992 (age 34); Zhengzhou, Henan, China
- Occupations: Actor, television presenter
- Years active: 2015–present
- Notable work: Story of Yanxi Palace; The Legend of Haolan; Court Lady
- Height: 182 cm (6 ft 0 in)
- Spouse: Wu Jinyan (m. 2024)
- Children: 1 daughter

Hong Yao (Chinese: 洪尧; born March 19, 1992) is a Chinese actor from Zhengzhou, Henan, currently signed under Huanyu Entertainment. He made his acting debut in the web series Love Against the Light, since then he had roles in a number of major television productions, including Story of Yanxi Palace and The Legend of Haolan, as well as major roles in a number of drama series.

== Career ==
Hong is skilled in dance and has won several dance competition awards including the Excellence Award at the CCTV National Television Dance Competition, runner-up in the national street dance competition "Double Star Cup" group dance category, and champion in the group dance category of the BOTY World Street Dance Competition China division. He appeared in the dating show Perfect Date in 2013, and the reality show Mister Super in 2014, which gained him some attention over his relationship featured in these shows.

Hong was given his first acting role in the 2015 web series Love Against the Light (逆光之恋), which was followed by roles in "Unforgettable Years" and "Demon Girl". In 2017, he played one of the main characters in a China-Taiwan co-production Art of Love. In 2018, he was cast as Aisin-Gioro Hongzhou in a major television production Story of Yanxi Palace. and the following year as Prince Jiao in The Legend of Haolan. He played the character Shen Tingbai in Arsenal Military Academy in 2019. He also appeared in the 2021 series Court Lady. He had many roles in a number of web series, including a major role in The League of Noblemen (君子盟).

== Personal life ==
On September 13, 2024, Wu Jinyan and Hong Yao announced their marriage on Weibo by posting their marriage certificates with the caption: "Got it today" and "Got married today" and ""We collected these today", tagging each other. The couple previously worked together in the 2018 film Story of Yanxi Palace, and the 2021 film The Age of Youth. Wu later gave birth to a daughter in February 2025.

== Filmography ==
=== Television series/web series ===
Year	Title	Role	Notes
2015	Against the Light (逆光之恋)	Xiao Qun	Web series
2016	Demon Girl (半妖倾城)	Fu Xingbang	Web series
2016	Demon Girl season 2	Fu Xingbang	Web series
Unaired	Sunsong (梦回朝歌)	Yun Teng	Filmed 2016–17
2017	Above the Clouds	Jia Ming	
2017	Art in Love (那刻的怦然心動)	Qiu Jiawu	
2018	The Princess Weiyoung	Huan Yuan	
2018	Story of Yanxi Palace	Hong Zhou	
2019	The Legend of Haolan	Prince Jiao	
2019	Arsenal Military Academy	Shen Tingbai	
2021	Fighting Youth (正青春)	Dante	
2021	Sunshine of My Life (若你安好便是晴天)	Fang Xiaoyu	
2021	Court Lady	Yan Zifang	
2021	The Master of Cheongsam (一剪芳华)	Jiang Mosheng	
2022	Dangerous Lover (危险爱人)	Peng Zhe/Jiang Yi	Web series
2023	The League of Noblemen (君子盟)	Wang Yan	Web series, filmed 2020
2024	Everyone Loves Me (别对我动心)	Jiang Yishi	Web series
2024	Follow Your Heart (颜心记)	Bai Yuan	Web series
2024	Misplacement (错爱双生)	Yin Heng	Web short series
2025	Feud (临江仙)	Xiao Jingshan	Web series
Unaired	Unforgettable Years (念念不忘的岁月)	Jiang Chunxue	Filmed 2015
Unaired	Different Her: Approaching Darkness		Web series

=== Films ===
Year	Title	Role	Notes
2019	The Unqualified General: Beauty's Face	Ye Zhong	Web film
2019	The Unqualified General: Soul Battle	Ye Zhong	Web film

=== Variety shows ===
Date	Show	Network	Notes
September 8, 2013	Perfect Date	Guizhou Television	
September 12, 2014	Mister Super	Anhui Television	Eliminated
November 6, 2015	Run for Time	Hunan Television	
October 18, 2018	Forgive Me for Speaking Bluntly	Tencent Video	With Charmaine Sheh
