= Jia Qing =

Chinese actress

- 贾清
- Born: Jia Qing (贾青); Xi'an, Shaanxi, China
- Other names: Ting Anne Jia; Qing Qing (青青); Qing'er (青儿); Yang Yang (阳阳)
- Education: Xie Jin Film & Television Art College, Shanghai Normal University
- Occupations: Actress; singer
- Years active: 2005–present
- Agents: Huace Film & TV (2005–2019); Hesong Entertainment (2019–present)
- Height: 1.7 m (5 ft 7 in)

Chinese name
- Traditional Chinese: 賈清
- Simplified Chinese: 贾清
Transcriptions
Standard Mandarin
- Hanyu Pinyin: Jiǎ Qīng

Birth name
- Traditional Chinese: 賈青
- Simplified Chinese: 贾青
Transcriptions
Standard Mandarin
- Hanyu Pinyin: Jiǎ Qīng

Jia Qing is a Chinese actress and singer. She is known for her roles in television dramas The Demi-Gods and Semi-Devils, The Deer and the Cauldron, The Wife's Lies and its sister series The Lover's Lies, and God of War, Zhao Yun.

== Background ==
She was born Jia Qing (贾青) in Xi'an, Shaanxi, China. She attended Xie Jin Film & Television Art College of the Shanghai Normal University.

In 2005 at the age 19, she participated the singing contest My Type My Show (我型我秀) and won Leica Cool Performance Award (莱卡酷表现奖). She later formed a Mandopop group JADE with fellow singers Liu Yujia (刘钰佳), Xia Yanyan (夏筠妍), and Duan Xi (段曦) and released their album on the following year in February.

In July 2007, she made her first acting debut in the 2007 television series Liao Zhai 2.

On November 11, 2018, Jia announced on her Weibo account that she had changed her given name, with Qīng 青 changed to Qīng 清 (different characters but same pronunciation).

== Filmography ==
=== Film ===
Year	English title	Original title	Role	Ref.
2008	The Marriage Trap	婚礼	Bride	
2009	The Square Team	方队	Dai Beibei	
2011	White Vengeance	鸿门宴	Female assassin	
2012	Moonlight Love	月光恋	Ah Yao	
2018	Legends of the Three Kingdoms	三国杀·幻	Wang Shu	
2022	Ordinary Hero	平凡英雄	Luo Bing	

=== Television series ===
Years	English title	Original title	Role	Ref.
2007	Liao Zhai 2	聊斋2	Fang Lin	
2007	The Red Spider III	红蜘蛛3: 水中花	Palace maid	
2008	My Depraved Brother	义本同心	Tong Xin	
2008	8 Avatar	八仙全传	Yan Cai	
2008		多情女人痴情男	Zhou Qingqing	
2009	Missing Person Notice	寻人启事	Zhuo Yaoyao	
2009		战火中青春	Tong Hui	
2010	Sanctuary	圣堂风云	Lei Yinyin	
2010	Betray the Femininity	温柔的背叛	Zhuang Caiwei	
2010	Liao Zhai 3	聊斋3	Fan Jiangcheng	
2011	30 Get Married	三十而嫁	Yu Momo	
2012	Embarrassed People A Happy Life	囧人的幸福生活	Yi Xiaoxi	
2012		游击兵工厂	Jiang Hongyu	
2012	Sharp Shooter	神枪	Li Xinghua	
2013	Marry to Love	隐婚日记	Yan Qian	
2013	Lion Roar in Battlefield	战地狮吼	Jiu Sui Hong	
2013	The World Without Thieves	无贼	Zhou Shushu	
2013	The Demi-Gods and Semi-Devils	天龙八部	A'Zhu/A'Zi	
2014	Perfect Couple	金玉良缘	Chu Chu	
2014	Dong Jiang Hero	东江英雄刘黑仔	Anna	
2014	Swords of Legends	古剑奇谭	Qiu Xinrui	
2014	Mission Impossible	劫中劫	Meng Meiru	
2014	The Deer and the Cauldron	鹿鼎记	A'Ke/Chen Yuanyuan	
2014	The Great Protector	镖门	Lu Yaoting	
2015	Chi Shui He Guo Niang	赤水河国酿	Qian Mengdie	
2015	Pink Collar Girl	闺蜜的心事	Bai Qian	
2015	The Four	少年四大名捕	Ji Yaohua/Fairy Mingyou	
2015	The Wife's Lies	妻子的谎言	Li Xiaxi	
2016	The Lover's Lies	爱人的谎言	Tong Siji	
2016	Unified Three Kingdoms	一统三国	Feng Jian'an	
2016	God of War, Zhao Yun	武神赵子龙	Gongsun Baoyue	
2016	The Fatal Mission	怒江之战	Liao Yifang	
2016	Distressed Beauty	卿本佳人	Shang Haitang (Wang Peilan)	
2017	Legend of Night	八方传奇	Huai Hua (Liu Zhange)	
2017	The Legendary Tycoon	传奇大亨	Hu Biyu	
2017	Peacekeeping Infantry Battalion	维和步兵营	Hai Lan	
2018	Ours Thousands of Songs	我们的千阙歌	Cheng Lingyun	
2020	Unbending Will	石头开花	Tong Weiwei	
2020	Healer of Children	了不起的儿科医生	Gu Jiaren	
2021	Heroic Legend	大英雄	Yi Zhanghong (Qi Caifeng)	
2021	Greenwich Mean Time	格林威治时间	Tan Ya	
2022	Hello, The Sharpshooter	你好，神枪手	Ding Fang	
2023	The Girls' Lies	恋人的谎言	Shu Fei	
2023	Prosecution Elite	公诉	Zhang Wanru	
2024	The Neighbour	她和她的他们	Zhou Yunqi	
Under Production		赤水河国酿	Qian Mengdie	
Under Production	Lose My Heart to You	心爱的	Lin Jiaqi	
Under Production	Xi Xia Book of Death	西夏死书	Liang Yuan	
Under Production	Black Isle of Purgatory	黑岛炼狱		

== Discography ==
=== Singles ===
Year	English title	Chinese title	Album	Notes
2011	"Mask of Goddess"	女神的面纱		
2013		痴情冢	The Demi-Gods and Semi-Devils OST	
2014	"Perfect Couple"	金玉良缘	Perfect Couple OST	
2015	"Foolish"	傻得可以	The Wife's Lies OST	
2016	"If Hold Hands"	如果牵手	The Lover's Lies OST	
2016	"Wish"	心愿	The Fatal Mission OST	

== Awards and nominations ==
Year	Award	Category	Nominated work	Result	Ref.
2010	East Movie Channel TV Series Awards	Most Popular Actress	—N/a	Won	
2011	Jiangsu Television TV Series Awards	Most Popular Actress	Zhan Huo Hou De Qing Chun	Won	
2011	LeTV Entertainment Awards	Most Anticipated Newcomer	—N/a	Won	
