= Lucky's First Love =

2019 Chinese television drama series

- Promotional poster
- Also known as: The World Owes Me a First Love
- Simplified Chinese: 世界欠我一个初恋
- Hanyu Pinyin: Shìjiè qiàn wǒ yīgè chūliàn
- Genre: Rom-com; Youth
- Based on: "The World Owes Me a First Love" (世界欠我一个初恋) by An Siyuan
- Written by: Sun Qijun; Zhang Ying; Zhu Zitao
- Directed by: Chen Shiyi
- Starring: Xing Zhaolin; Bai Lu
- Country of origin: China
- Original language: Mandarin
- No. of seasons: 1
- No. of episodes: 24

Production
- Producers: Dai Ying; Zhang Yan; Sun Qijun; Gong Yu
- Running time: 45 minutes
- Production companies: Heli Chenguang Media; Shanghai Heli Film and Television Media

Original release
- Network: iQIYI
- Release: September 25 – October 18, 2019

Lucky's First Love (Chinese: 世界欠我一个初恋; pinyin: Shìjiè qiàn wǒ yīgè chūliàn) is a 2019 Chinese television series based on a novel with the same title by An Siyuan, starring Xing Zhaolin and Bai Lu. It aired in iQIYI on 25 September until 18 October 2019 every Wednesdays, Thursdays, Fridays for 24 episodes.

== Synopsis ==
A story about first love and romances from the perspective of three couples in the workplace. It tells an independent and potential brimming young woman Xing Yun (played by Bai Lu) who crosses paths with a black-bellied CEO Xia Ke (played by Xing Zhaolin). At first, Xiang Yun is recruited to work at Xia Ke's gaming company, where she changed from a sketch artist to a gaming designer. In the other side, the determined and headstrong Xia Ke chose to make the business on his own, not succeeded it from his family. The two continuously bicker with each other, until love blooms between them.

== Broadcast ==
Channel	Country	Airing Date
iQIYI	China	September 25, 2019
iQIYI	Taiwan	September 25, 2019
Shenzhen TV	China	August 14, 2020

== Cast ==
=== Main ===
- Xing Zhaolin as Xia Ke

A domineering, talented, yet sinister CEO of a famous gaming company "TIG" who chooses to build his own business, not inherits it from his family. He slowly falls in love with Xing Yun, even only showing his calm demeanor to her.

- Bai Lu as Xing Yun

Born on 23 September 1994, she is a smart and hard-working sketch artist. Silly, cute, geeky, sensible, she is actually Chu Nan's girlfriend before eventually falls in love with her own boss, Xia Ke.

=== Supporting ===
- Zhai Zilu as He Yu

Xia Ke's collegemate and a love expert who always hits the right target and is loved by everyone. He likes Xing Yun at first, but later becomes Yao Qing's boyfriend.

- Chen Haolan as Yao Qing

Xia Ke's collegemate, a capable and chic young woman who just relies on her own efforts to win. She actually has a crush on Xia Ke before He Yu.

- Liu Ruoyan as Shen Qing

Xia Ke's older sister, a mature and charming woman who can be blind in love. She is Chu Nan's girlfriend who was separated due to her mother's objection but able to marry him in the end.

- Huang Jidong as Chu Nan

An elegant gentleman with good-looking features who goes to blind date with Xing Yun. He becomes Shen Qing's boyfriend and later marry her.

- Li Linfei as Amy, Xia Ke's assistant.
- Jessie Li as Xu Yiyi
- Fu Bohan as Shen Xiaoxi, Shen Qing's son.
- Gao Shiming as Ling Shan
- Hong Jianing as Meng Meng
- Zhao Xinchong as Dong Dong
- Zhou Ruijun as Zhang Sirui
- Cheng Shiyu as Mr. Lin
- Cao Yufeng as Joe
- Zhang Ruofeng as A Kai
- Li Honglei as Lao Hu
- Feng Dalu ad Uncle An
- Bi Hui as Xing Cheng
- Qu Gang as Zhuang Lao
- Osaki Akira as Mr. Fu You

==== Main characters family ====
- Fang Fang as Fang Ling, Xia Ke's grandmother
- Zhou Xiaoli as Xing Yun's mother
- Xu Yongge as Xing Yun's father
- Bian Tao as Chu Nan's father
- Zhou Ling as Chu Nan's mother

==== Company personnels ====
- Yang Shu as Director Wang
- Gavin Xie as Director Qian
- Leng Haiming as President Chen
- Zhao Wenming as President Sun
- Zhang Shuo as Director Duan
- Cheng Hong as President Qin
