= Xu Kai =

Chinese actor and model (born 1995)

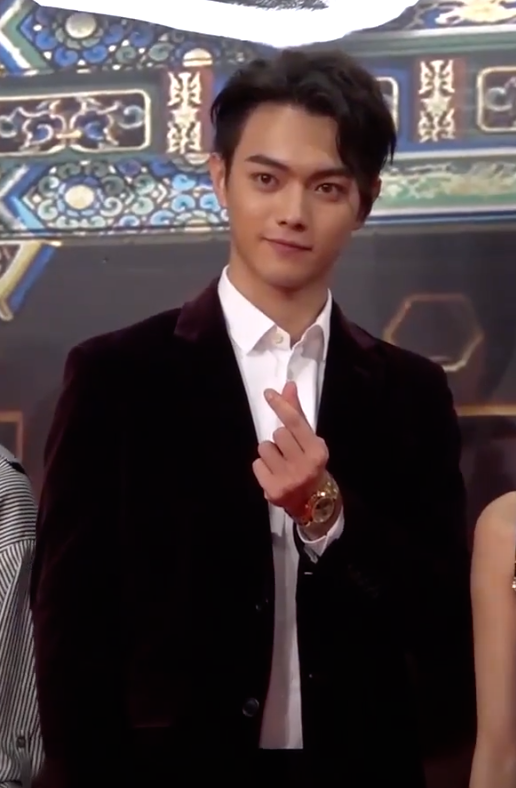
- Xu during Mid-Autumn Festival 2018
- Born: March 5, 1995 (age 31); Shenzhen, Guangdong, China
- Other names: Kevin Xu; Soso
- Occupations: Actor; model
- Years active: 2016–present
- Agent: Huanyu Film
- Notable work: Fuca Fuheng in Story of Yanxi Palace; Li Chenlan in The Legends; Gu Yanzhen in Arsenal Military Academy; Zhu Zhanji in Royal Feast; Yao Zhiming in Best Choice Ever; Mei Zhuyu in Moonlit Reunion
- Height: 1.87 m (6 ft 1 1/2 in)

Chinese name
- Traditional Chinese: 許凱
- Simplified Chinese: 许凯
Transcriptions
Standard Mandarin
- Hanyu Pinyin: Xǔ Kǎi
- Website: Official Instagram; Official Weibo

Xu Kai (simplified Chinese: 许凯; traditional Chinese: 許凱; pinyin: Xǔ Kǎi, born 5 March 1995) is a Chinese actor and model. He is known for his roles in television series Story of Yanxi Palace, The Legends, Arsenal Military Academy: AMA, Falling into Your Smile, Royal Feast, Best Choice Ever, As beautiful as you and Moonlit Reunion.

== Early life ==
Xu was born on 5 March 1995 in Shenzhen, Guangdong, China. He has an elder brother. He studied finance at South China Agricultural University before dropping out in 2016 to pursue an acting career.

== Career ==
=== Beginning ===
In 2013, Xu started his career as a model by winning the 1st place in the print ads/ graphic category at China's International Model Contest held in Guangzhou. In 2016, he entered the entertainment industry after signing a contract with Huanyu Film, a company owned by Yu Zheng That same year, he was cast in his first television drama Zhaoge, where he played Yang Jian, though the series was never aired.

=== 2018–present: Rising popularity ===
In 2018, Xu starred in the historical romance drama Untouchable Lovers. Later, he starred in a palace drama Story of Yanxi Palace, where he gained mainstream recognition for his role of Fucha Fuheng. The drama was enormously popular in China and international markets. The series trended at No. 1 and was most searched drama globally.

In 2019, Xu made his big-screen debut in the romance film Autumn Fairy Tale. He played his first lead role as Li Chenlan in historical drama The Legends. his role as a loyal and reticent demon prince in the series received positive responses and a surge in his popularity. He starred in the youth based military drama Arsenal Military Academy as Gu Yenzhen. His portrayal of rich playboy earned him the "Best Actor Award" at the Hengdian Film and at TV Festival of China and Singapore's StarHub Night of Stars. Later in the same year, he starred in the series Once Upon a Time in Lingjian Mountain, based on the manhua Congqian Youzuo Lingjianshan.

In 2020, Xu starred in the historical fantasy drama Dance of the Sky Empire.

In 2021, Xu starred in the Chinese e-sports romance comedy series Falling Into Your Smile as Lu Sicheng, which gained international popularity. He also starred in the Chinese Xianxia fantasy romance series Ancient Love Poetry as Bai Jue.

In 2022, Xu played lead role of Zhu Zhanji in the historical fiction drama Royal Feast, which gained more than 400M in the viewership. He played Ding Yunqi, in a treasure hunter series Lost in the Kunlun Mountains. Later, he played an innocent soft-spoken Yang Hua, in a modern drama She and Her Perfect Husband. All the series received decent response.

In February 2023, Xu began filming for his upcoming modern drama titled As Beautiful As You. The drama is based on the Chinese novel As Beautiful as Beijing by author Jiu Yue Xi.

== Endorsements ==
From 2018 onwards, Xu has collaborated with various luxurious international brands such as Givenchy, Adidas, Versace, Tom Ford, Tiffany & Co., Roger Dubuis, Disney, Ralph Lauren, Bvlgari and Brunello Cucinelli.

Since 2018, Xu has collaborated with the Italian luxury house Fendi. In August 2021, the brand officially announced Xu as its brand ambassador. He also appears in the brand's campaign for Qixi, one of China's local iterations of Valentine's Day, which falls in August.

In October 2021, C. & J. Clark International Ltd, a British international shoe manufacturer, announced Xu as the brand's first spokesperson for Greater China. Later in the same year, the global fashion lifestyle brand Samsonite, announced Xu as its brand ambassador in China.

In May 2022, Xu was cover star for Grazia China Magazine. In December 2022, Xu takes the cover story of Harper's Bazaar China. He also stars in the cover story of Elle Men Fresh China Fall 2020 Issue.

On April 26, 2023, Xu attended Avrora Awards Ceremony in Beijing, China as brand ambassador for Bvlgari.

== Public image ==
Xu was listed in Forbes China "Top Influential People under 30 years old", for his substantial impact in the entertainment fields. By February 2023, he had more than 20.4M followers on Weibo. He ranked 2nd in "Most Handsome Chinese Idol 2021". He is ranked 2nd in "Best Chinese Actor", "Popular Actor" as per media index and "Most Handsome Chinese Actor 2023". He is "Top 5: Most Famous, Under 30 Chinese Actor" in terms of popularity.

== Filmography ==
=== Film ===
Year	English title	Chinese title	Role	Notes/Ref.
2019	Autumn Fairy Tale	蓝色生死恋	Han Tai	
2021	1921		Shen Yanbing	Support role
2022	Falling into Your Smile: The Movie	你微笑时很美 电影版	Lu Sicheng	

=== Television series ===
Year	English title	Chinese title	Role	Network	Notes/Ref.
2018	Untouchable Lovers	凤囚凰	Shen Yu	Hunan TV	Support role
2018	Story of Yanxi Palace	延禧攻略	Fucha Fuheng	iQIYI	
2019	The Legends	招摇	Li Chenlan / Mo Qing	Hunan TV, iQIYI	
2019	Arsenal Military Academy	烈火军校	Gu Yanzhen	iQIYI	
2019	Once Upon a Time in Lingjian Mountain	从前有座灵剑山	Wang Lu	iQIYI, Tencent	
2020	Dance of the Sky Empire	天舞纪	Li Xuan	iQIYI	
2021	Court Lady	骊歌行	Sheng Chumu	iQIYI, Tencent	
2021	Falling into Your Smile	你微笑时很美	Lu Sicheng	Tencent, Youku	
2021	Ancient Love Poetry	千古玦尘	Bai Jue / Qing Mu / Bo Xuan	Tencent	
2022	Royal Feast	尚食	Zhu Zhanji	Hunan TV, Mango TV	
2022	Lost in the Kunlun Mountains	迷航昆仑墟	Ding Yunqi	iQIYI, Tencent	
2022	She and Her Perfect Husband	爱的二八定律	Yang Hua	Tencent	
2023	Snow Eagle Lord	雪鹰领主	Dongbo Xueying	Tencent	
2023	Wonderland of Love	乐游原	Li Ni	Tencent	
2024	Sword and Fairy	祈今朝	Yue Jinzhao / Bian Luohan	Tencent	
2024	Best Choice Ever	承欢记	Yao Zhiming	CCTV-8, Tencent	
2024	As Beautiful as You	你比星光美丽	Han Ting	Hunan TV, Mango TV, Tencent	
2025	Moonlit Reunion	子夜归	Mei Zhuyu	Tencent	
TBA	Zhao Ge	朝歌	Yang Jian	iQIYI	
TBA	Fire Investigator	火场追凶	Yu Tong	Youku	
TBA	800 Meters	方圆八百米	Chen Hui	Tencent	
TBA	Yi Ou Chun	一瓯春	Shen Run / Yan Rui		
TBA	Tian Du Yi Wen Lu	天都异闻录	Shi Wuming	Hunan TV, Mango TV	

== Discography ==
=== Soundtrack appearances ===
Year	English title	Chinese title	Album	Notes	Ref.
2019	"Entering a Dream"	入梦	Arsenal Military Academy OST	with Bai Lu	
2021	"Soulmate"	第一默契	Falling Into Your Smile OST	with Cheng Xiao	

== Awards and nominations ==
Year	Award	Category	Nominated work	Result	Ref.
2018	7th iQIYI All-Star Carnival	Promising Actor Award	—N/a	Won	
2018	12th Tencent Video Star Awards	DOKI New Force Award	—N/a	Won	
2019	6th The Actors of China Award Ceremony	Best Actor (Web series)	Arsenal Military Academy	Nominated	
2019	6th Hengdian Film and TV Festival of China (Wenrong Awards)	Best Actor	Arsenal Military Academy	Won	
2019	StarHub Night of Stars 2019	Best Actor (China)	Arsenal Military Academy	Won	
2019	Golden Bud - The Fourth Network Film And Television Festival	Best Actor	The Legends, Arsenal Military Academy, Once Upon a Time in Lingjian Mountain	Nominated	
2019	8th iQIYI All-Star Carnival	Most Popular Drama Actor	—N/a	Won	
2019	16th Esquire Man At His Best Awards	Television Actor of the Year	—N/a	Won	
2019	Tencent Video All Star Awards	Trendy Figure of the Year	—N/a	Won	
2020	Tencent Video All Star Awards	Most Leap Actor of the Year	—N/a	Won	
2020	17th Esquire Man At His Best Awards	Breakthrough Artist of the Year	—N/a	Won	
