= The Deer and the Cauldron (2014 TV series) =

2014 Chinese TV series

- Poster
- 鹿鼎记
- Genre: Wuxia; Comedy; Historical fiction
- Based on: The Deer and the Cauldron by Jin Yong
- Screenplay by: Liu Dianrun
- Directed by: Lai Shui-ching; Billy Tang; Tam Yui-ming; Hsiao Pi-sun
- Starring: Han Dong; Wei Qianxiang; Lemon Zhang; Jia Qing; Zhao Yuanyuan; Viann Zhang
- Opening theme: "Such is Heaven's Will" (天意如此) by He Huihui and Lu Yang
- Ending theme: "You Are Not the Big Hero I Wanted to Marry Since I Was Young" (你不是我从小想嫁的大英雄) by Wang Le
- Composers: Lin Hai; Feng Shuo; Liu Chia-chang
- Country of origin: China
- Original language: Mandarin
- No. of episodes: 50

Production
- Producers: Wu Dun; Chen Pinxiang
- Production locations: Xiangshan Film City; Hengdian World Studios
- Cinematography: Zhao Xiaoding
- Running time: ≈45 minutes per episode
- Production companies: Huace Film & TV Production; Dongyang Daqian Media

Original release
- Network: Anhui TV; Sichuan TV; Yunnan TV
- Release: 20 December 2014 – 9 January 2015

The Deer and the Cauldron (鹿鼎记) is a Chinese wuxia-comedy television series adapted from the novel The Deer and the Cauldron by Jin Yong. It was directed by Lai Shui-ching, starring Han Dong, Wei Qianxiang and others. The series was shot from September–December 2013, and first aired on Anhui TV, Sichuan TV and Yunnan TV from 20 December 2014 to 9 January 2015.

== Cast ==
- Han Dong as Wei Xiaobao
- Wei Qianxiang as the Kangxi Emperor
- Zhang Meng as Shuang'er
- Lou Yixiao as Princess Jianning
- Viann Zhang as Su Quan
- Jia Qing as Ake / Chen Yuanyuan
- Wu Qian as Mu Jianping
- Zhao Yuanyuan as Fang Yi
- Wang Yahui as Zeng Rou
- Wang Lin as Wei Chunhua
- Michelle Yim as the Empress Dowager
- Lai Shui-ching as Oboi
- Ji Chunhua as Hai Dafu
- Li Qingxiang as Songgotu
- Liu Yong as Duolong
- Wen Jie as Prince Kang
- He Zhonghua as Chen Jinnan
- Wang Wanjuan as Jiunan
- Feng Jingao as Wu Sangui
- Gu Bin as Wu Yingxiong
- Lin Jiangguo as Zheng Keshuang
- Meng Fei as Feng Xifan
- Liu Dekai as the Shunzhi Emperor
- Ashton Chen as Jingyuan
- Jin Song as Mao Shiba
- Lu Yong as Hong Antong
- Tan Limin as Tao Hongying
- Min Zheng as Feng Jizhong
- Yu Kar-lun as Taoist Xuanzhen
- Wu Lipeng as Mu Jiansheng
- Wu Huaxin as Liu Yizhou
- Ren Xihong as Wu Lishen
- Xu Ming as Liu Dahong
- Tang Jin as Wen Youyi
- Hou Ruixiang as Wen Youdao
- Liu Changde as Feng Yifei
- Liu Changsheng as Xu Tianchuan
- Lin Yizheng as Thin Monk
- Gu Dechao as Fat Monk
- Wang Yi as Mao Dongzhu
- Zhong Lei as Bai Hanfeng
- Li Quanyou as Guan Anji
- Liu Wei as Qian Laoben
- Zhu Jiazhen as Qi Laosan
- Zhong Jiufu as Yang Yizhi
- Xie Qijun as Zhao Qixian
- Han Yinlong as Taoist Wugen
