= Under the Power =

- Genre: Wuxia; Romance
- Based on: Jin Yi Zhi Xia by Lan Seshi
- Directed by: Yin Tao
- Starring: Ren Jialun; Tan Songyun
- Country of origin: China
- Original language: Mandarin
- No. of episodes: 55

Production
- Executive producer: Wu Ruoyan
- Production locations: Hengdian World Studios; Suzhou
- Production companies: H&R Century Pictures; Impact Media

Original release
- Network: Mango TV iQiyi
- Release: December 28, 2019

Under the Power (Chinese: 锦衣之下; pinyin: Jin Yi Zhi Xia) is a 2019 Chinese television series based on the novel of the same name by Lan Seshi; starring Ren Jialun and Tan Songyun. The series premiered on Mango TV and iQiyi starting December 28, 2019.

== Synopsis ==
Genius constable Yuan Jinxia and ruthless secret police officer Lu Yi are at loggerheads, but are forced to work together when the government loses one hundred thousand taels of silver. They work severals cases of murder, betrayal, conspiracies, piracy and rebellion. They gradually became friends and fall in love with each other. Unfortunately, Yuan Jinxia finds out, her family was massacred by the secret police due to false incriminating evidence against her grandfather. She and Lu Yi work together to clear her family's name, but she must ultimately choose between revenge for her family's death at the hands of the secret police or love for Li Yi.

== Cast ==
=== Main ===
- Ren Jialun as Lu Yi
- Tan Songyun as Yuan Jinxia

=== Supporting ===
- Han Dong as Yan Shifan
- Ye Qing as Shangguan Xi
- Yao Yichen as Xie Xiao
- Lu Hong as Yang Yue
- Han Chengyu as Lan Daoheng
- Xi Xue as Lin Mai
- Wan Tong as Di Lanye
- Huang Youqi as Cen Fu
- Wang Hua as Luo Wenlong
- Liu Wei as Lu Bing
- Li Tingzhe as Qi Shu
- Ding Yongdai as Jiajing Emperor
- Li Chengru as Yan Song
- Li Qinqin as Yuan Jinxia's mother
- Guo Xiaofeng as Yang Chengwan

== Original soundtrack ==
Released on 2020
No.	Title	Lyrics	Music	Artist	Length
1.	"Wish" (愿)	Tian Ding	Xia Houzhe	Zhou Shen	4:28
2.	"Heart Wall" (心墙)	Zhou Xiaoyi; Wu Ruoyan	Zhu Yun	Ren Jialun	4:41
3.	"This Summer" (今夏)	XiaXiaobin	Wang Zihe	Tan Songyun	4:01
4.	"Sigh" (叹)	Ye Qing; Zhao Tian Yu	Ye Qing; Zhao Tian Yu	Ye Qing; Zhao Tian Yu	3:41
5.	"Far From the Hall of Fame" (朝堂元)	Braska	Braska	Braska	4:20
Total length:					19:29

== Production ==
Under the Power was filmed from September 2017 to January 2018 at Hengdian World Studios and Suzhou.

== International broadcast ==
Region	Network	Dates	Notes
Singapore	Mediacorp Channel 8	2 June – 18 August (Monday to Friday at 11:00 PM)	Original; 10 July, stop broadcasting one day (election)
