= Forever and Ever (TV series) =

Chinese television series

- Genre: Modern, Romance
- Based on: Yi Sheng Yi Shi Mei Ren Gu (一生一世美人骨) by Mo Bao Fei Bao
- Directed by: Shen Yang
- Starring: Ren Jialun; Bai Lu
- Country of origin: China
- Original language: Mandarin
- No. of episodes: 30

Production
- Running time: 40 mins
- Production companies: iQIYI; HUACE FILM&TV; Xiamen Film Industry Service Center Co., Ltd.

Original release
- Network: iQIYI
- Release: September 6, 2021

Forever and Ever (Chinese: 一生一世) is a 2021 contemporary Chinese romantic television series, starring Ren Jialun and Bai Lu. The series is based on the novel Yi Sheng Yi Shi Mei Ren Gu (一生一世美人骨) by Mo Bao Fei Bao. It's available on iQIYI and iQ.com from September 6, 2021. The series is part of iQIYI's Sweet On Theater (恋恋剧场), the network's original line-up of romantic television series. The series is a themed companion and sequel to One and Only, and both shows were released back-to-back. Both series were adapted from the same novel and features the same characters in different eras. The drama was a commercial success and one of iQIYI's most popular show of 2021.

== Cast ==
=== Main ===
- Ren Jialun as Chen Zhousheng, a chemistry professor
- Bai Lu as Shi Yi, a voice actor

=== Supporting ===
- Ci Sha as Mei Xing
- Wang Yueyi as Hong Xiaoyu
- Luo Mingjie as Zhou Wenchuan
- Wang Ruixin as Zhou Wenxing
- Luo Haiqiong as Qin Wan
- Feng Jiayi as Zhou Shengxing

== Production ==
The series' filming began between September and November 2020.
