= Arsenal Military Academy =

2019 Chinese TV series

- Official Poster
- Genre: Military; Action thriller War; Romance
- Written by: Xiao Xiang Dong Er
- Directed by: Hue Kai Dong
- Starring: Bai Lu; Xu Kai; Li Chengbin; Wu Jiayi
- Opening theme: "Soldier (战士)" by Lu Hu
- Ending theme: "Raging Fire (烈火)" by Dong Li "Poison (毒药)" by Wang Yizhe
- Country of origin: China
- Original language: Mandarin
- No. of episodes: 48

Production
- Producer: Yu Zheng
- Production locations: Zhejiang; Hengdian World Studios
- Camera setup: Multiple-camera setup
- Running time: 45 minutes
- Production companies: Huanyu Film Company iQiyi; Tencent Pictures

Original release
- Network: iQiyi
- Release: 6 August – 6 September 2019

Arsenal Military Academy (Chinese: 烈火军校; pinyin: Lièhuǒ Jūnxiào) is a 2019 Chinese streaming television series, directed by Hue Kaidong, starring Bai Lu, Xu Kai, Li Chengbin and Wu Jiayi in main roles. The series tells the story of Xie Xiang, who disguises herself as a male student under her brother's name to join the military academy .

== Synopsis ==
Xie Xiang (Bai Lu) enrolls into the Arsenal Military Academy in Shunyuan disguised as a male, to follow her deceased brother's footsteps, with only her good friend Tan Xiaojun (Zhang Xin) knowing her secret. In an unexpected situation, she in disguise, encounters hot-headed and playful Gu Yanzheng (Xu Kai). Her first impression of him wasn't good though. Gu Yanzheng turns out to be her roommate in the academy, and then onwards they indulge into periodic quarrels with each other.

At academy, Xie Xiang becomes good friends with the country bumpkin Huang Song (Liu Sibo) and the quiet Shen Jushan (Li Chengbin). Despite her small stature and weak constitution, she gradually trains into an able soldier, winning the respect of her peers. Parallel to their training, students soon uncover a dangerous conspiracy surrounding the Japanese occupiers, the Chinese resistance, as well as past royal descendants of the now defunct Qing dynasty. Students support each other in bringing justice to their country.

== Casts ==
=== Main Cast ===
- Bai Lu as Xie Xiang / Xie Liangchen
- Xu Kai as Gu Yanzhen
- Li Chengbin as Shen Jushan
- Wu Jiayi as Qu Manting

=== Supporting Cast ===
==== Academy Faculty ====
- Liu Runnan as Li Wenzhong
  - An academy cadet who often causes trouble and goes against Xie Xiang at the academy.
- Wang Yizhe as Ji Jin
  - An academy cadet who is Shen Junshan's best friend. He always catches Gu Yanzhen's whimsical yet questionable antics and gestures towards Xie Xiang at the academy.
- Liu Sibo as Huang Song
  - An academy cadet from the countryside who befriends Xie Xiang on the first day. He is playful and simple-minded yet passionate and loyal.
- Meng En as Zhu Yanlin
  - An academy cadet who has a full sense of justice.
- Shao Bing as Guo Shuting
  - The Deputy Director of the Academy and the student's tactics instructor. He indulges himself in alcohol, unable to move on from his first love, Pei Nianqing. He becomes a close ally and mentor of Xie Xiang.
- Lin Yo-wei as Lu Zhongyu
  - The Head Academy Instructor who is harsh due to the pressure of keeping the Academy together and in harmony with the political state in Shunyuan.
- Nan Fulong as Instructor Song
- Dalai Harihu as Academy Deputy Director

==== Nan Shan Bar ====
- Liu Min as Huo Xiao Yu
  - The Nan Shan Bar's owner and a close friend of Guo Shu Ting. She was a part of the Opera troupe during the Qing Dynasty before becoming a bar owner. Xiao Yu is a well-respected individual in Shunyuan with a lot of connections underground.
- Zhang Xin as Tan Xiaojun
  - Xie Xiang's best friend who is also a waitress and bartender at Nan Shan Bar. She often visits the Academy Cadets on their outings with Qu Manting.
- Zheng Long as Xiao Liu
  - Huo Xiaoyu's subordinate.
- Chang Cheng as Xiao Dai
  - Huo Xiaoyu's subordinate.
- Ma Wen Chao as Zha Meng
  - Huo Xiaoyu's subordinate.

==== Paramo Cabaret ====
- Zhang Nan as Yuan Pingting
  - A new actress that gains popularity quickly during Manting's downfall.
- Sun Tao as Manager Huang
  - Butler of the Shen household who also manages the Cabaret.
- An An as Xiao Yang
- Fei Li Qi as Xiao Tao

==== People of Shunyuan ====
- An Yuexi as An Wen
  - Owner of a florist shop in Shunyuan. She suffers from anterograde amnesia.
- Liu Feng Gang as News Agency Director
- Liu Yin Jun as Zhang Hao Ran
  - Newspaper Editor's son.
- Gong Zheng Nan as Director Sheng
- Feng Wu Sheng as Jiang Hao / Jiang Han Nian
  - A criminal.

==== Chinese Chamber of Commerce ====
- Hong Yao as Shen Tingbai
  - An influential and powerful leader of the Shunyuan Chamber of Commerce. He is Qu Manting's ex-fiance who still devotes himself to her and aids her from afar. He is Shen Junshan's older brother.
- Shen Qi as Benzi
  - Shen Tingbai's assistant.
- Sun Rong as Master Shen
  - Tingbai and Junshan's father.

==== Japanese Chamber of Commerce ====
- Gao Yu'er as Jin Xianrong / Oda Hiroshi
  - Character Allusion: Yoshiko Kawashima
  - A complex and calculating businesswoman and eventually leader of the Japanese Chamber of Commerce. She was originally adopted into Prince Rong's manor but was driven out and taken in by Oda Yukihide. She is also Shen Junshan's friend who met him abroad while studying in the United Kingdom.
- Ma Ang as Fujiwara Ichiro
  - Jin Xianrong's aide and bodyguard. He comes into conflict with her as he intends to hurt Shen Junshan for their plan against the Chinese.
- Liu Enshang as Sato Kazuo
  - A Japanese businessman. Jin Xianrong replaced his position as chairman of the Japanese Chamber of Commerce.
- Wang Kan as Lieutenant General Miyazawa

==== Qing Dynasty Royalty ====
- Yin Zheng as Cheng Rui, Prince of the Third Rank
  - He is the son of Prince Rong, the last remaining royal descendant of the Qing Dynasty. He is Oda Xianrong's adoptive older brother.
- Shen Baoping as Prince Rong
- Li Qinqin as Prince Consort (Fujin) Rong
- Huai Yuan as Pei Shun

==== Gu Manor ====
- Ren Shan as Gu Zong Tang
  - Newly appointed Vice Governor of Feng'an at the beginning of the series. Gu Yanzhen and Gu Qiqi's father.
- Zhang Yixi as Gu Qiqi
  - Yanzhen's stepsister. She later has a crush on Xie Xiang, disguised as Xie Liangchen.
- Zheng Sheng Li as Butler Zu
- Yue Chun Yu as Mr. Zhao

==== Xie Family ====
- Dong Li as Xie Liangchen
  - Xie Xiang's older brother. He died after enrolling to be a student at the academy. Xie Xiang decides to take his place to fulfill his dream.
- Zhang Gong as Xie Zhipei
  - A professor in Beijing who is Xie Xiang and Xie Liangchen's father.
- Lu Ling as Mrs. Xie
  - Xie Xiang and Liangchen's mother.

==== Qu Family ====
- Li Jie as Mr. Qu
  - Patriarch of the Qu Family, Manting, and Manshu's father. He is stubborn and opposes Manting.
- He Jiayi as Mrs. Qu
  - Mr. Qu's wife and Manting and Manshu's mother. She is also Pei Nianqing's sister.
- Sun Anke as Qu Manshu
  - Manting's younger sister.
- Zuo Xiaoqing as Pei Nianqing
  - Mrs. Qu's sister, Xiaoyu's friend and Guo Shuting's sweetheart, a character who died before the beginning of the series.
- Yang Yu Lan as Mrs. He
  - The Qu family's housekeeper.

==== Officials, Ministers, Commanders ====
- Yang Hongwu as Mayor Bai
- Chen Bao Guo as Mr. Zhou
- Xiao Rong Sheng as Commander Zhang Si Ling
- Sun Di as Captain He
  - Shunyuan Police Captain.
- Zhao Yong Zhan as Wang Bo Xun
  - Shunyuan Police Chief.

==== Daughters of Shunyuan Officials ====
- Xuan Lu as Bai Biyun
  - Mayor Bai's daughter.
- Wang Ruo Xue as Miss Du
  - Shen Tingbai and Junshan's cousin. She looks down on Manting because of her profession.
- Han Le Yao as Zhao Qianqian
  - Gu Yanzhen's cousin.
- Zhang Jialin as Dong Xiaowan
  - Gu Yanzhen's ex-fiancee.

==== People of Peking (Beijing) ====
- Li Jun Yi as Lin Xian Wei
- Hua Cheng as Chen Rong
- Fan Xishi as Song Mao Gong
  - Beijing Police Chief.

== Soundtrack ==
Title	Lyrics	Music	Singer	Ref.
Soldier (战士): Opening Theme	Yu Zheng	Lu Hu	Lu Hu	
Enter a Dream (入梦)	Wang Yaoguang	Ai Qing and Zhaho Se	Bai Lu and Xu Kai	
Raging Fire (烈火): Ending Theme	Yu Zheng	Wang Yaoguang	Dong Li	
Moonlight Tango (月光探戈)	Wang Yaoguang	Wang Yaoguang	Wu Jiayi	
Poison (毒药)	Yu Zheng	Wang Yaoguang	Wang Yizhe	

== Production ==
On 26 March 2018, Filming of the series began at Hengdian Studios and Zhejiang Province. On 6 August 2018, the filming was completed and it officially entered post-production.

== Broadcast ==
It originally aired two episodes daily on iQiyi, Tuesday to Friday at 20:00 from 6 August 2019 to 6 September 2019. The series was presented on Viki Rakuten Global TV.

== Awards and nominations ==
Award	Category	Nominated work	Result	Ref.
China Entertainment Industry Summit (Golden Pufferfish Awards)	Best Drama	Arsenal Military Academy	Nominated	
Golden Bud - The Fourth Network Film And Television Festival	Best Web Series	Arsenal Military Academy	Nominated	
Golden Bud - The Fourth Network Film And Television Festival	Best Actor	Xu Kai	Nominated	
Golden Bud - The Fourth Network Film And Television Festival	Best Actress	Bai Lu	Nominated	
6th Hengdian Film and TV Festival of China (Wenrong Awards)	Best Actor	Xu Kai	Won	
6th The Actors of China Award	Best Actor (Web series)	Xu Kai	Won	
6th The Actors of China Award	Best Actress (Web series)	Bai Lu	Nominated	
StarHub Night of Stars 2019	Best Actor (China)	Xu Kai	Won	
StarHub Night of Stars 2019	Most Promising Actress	Bai Lu	Won	
8th iQiyi All-Star Carnival	Most Popular Actor	Xu Kai	Won	
8th iQiyi All-Star Carnival	Most Popular Actress	Bai Lu	Won	
