= Court Lady =

Chinese television series

- Also known as: Shèng Táng Gōnglüè (盛唐攻略); Xùn Fū Jì Zhī Dàtáng Nǚ'ér Xíng (驯夫记之大唐女儿行)
- Traditional Chinese: 大唐女兒行
- Simplified Chinese: 大唐女儿行
- Literal meaning: Ode to Daughter of the Great Tang
- Hanyu Pinyin: Dàtáng Nǚ'ér Xíng
- Genre: Historical fiction
- Written by: Feng Nong
- Directed by: Hui Kaidong; Wen Deguang
- Starring: Xu Kai; Li Yitong
- Country of origin: China
- Original language: Mandarin

Production
- Executive producer: Li Xiuzhen
- Producer: Yu Zheng
- Production location: Hengdian World Studios
- Production companies: Huanyu Film; TVB

Court Lady (Chinese: 大唐女儿行; pinyin: Dàtáng Nǚ'ér Xíng) is a 2021 Chinese television series produced by Yu Zheng, starring Xu Kai and Li Yitong.

== Plot ==
Once renowned as Chang’an’s number one hedonist, Sheng Chumu could barely ride on a horse without falling off. Now, he has fallen head over heels for a seamstress from Guangzhou and will do anything to be with her, including giving up his previous lifestyle and going through a one hundred and eighty degree change to improve his literary knowledge and martial arts. But will his entry into her life be a blessing or a downfall?

A quick-witted and talented seamstress, Fu Rou manages her family’s embroidery business in Guangzhou. Unfortunately, a fire burns everything she knew into nothing. Left with nothing, Fu Rou and her family follow Sheng Chumu to Chang’an to start anew. However, her talent for embroidery eventually threw her into court. In a palace full of princes, Fu Rou has attracted the eyes of a particularly stubborn prince to herself. Determined to stick to her principles, Fu Rou has to navigate through schemes while staying true to herself. With the troubles of the court, will Sheng Chumu ever be able to reunite with Fu Rou? Or will the palace walls forever cut them off?

== Cast ==
=== Main ===
- Xu Kai as Sheng Chumu
  - Historical prototype: Sheng Chumu (盛楚慕), son of Cheng Yaojin.
  - The eldest son of the Duke Lu, Young Lord Sheng. Once considered Chang’an’s number one playboy. Falling in love with Fu Ruo makes him realise his shortcomings and dedicates his time to make himself a mature man who is worthy of her love.
- Li Yitong as Fu Rou
  - Lu Chen Yue as young Fu Rou
  - Second daughter of Fu Jia Weng, embroidery merchant in Guangzhou and his second madame. Quick witted and a talented seamstress. She eventually falls in love with Sheng Chumo but is summoned to the palace to become Directress Fu of the Royal Embroidery Department.

=== Supporting ===
Fu Family

- Zhang Nan as Fu Yin
  - Third and youngest daughter of Fu Jia Weng and his third madame. Naive and innocent. Eventually infiltrates General Lu's manor as a handmaid named Yin'er to seek revenge.
- Wang You Jun as Fu Tao / Xi Tao
  - Only son of Fu Jia Weng and his third madame. Respectful and obedient to Fu Rou. Runs away from home to join the army and changes his name to Xi Tao to conceal his identity. Becomes a subordinate of Lu Yunji.
- Wang Yuan Ke as Fu Jun
  - Eldest daughter of Fu Jia Weng and his first madame. Married to Xu You Tong.
- Wang Yu as Xu You Tong, Fu Jun's husband.
- Yan Jing Yao as First Madame Fu
- Lu Ling as Second Madame Fu
- Xu Rong Zhen as Third Madame Fu, mother of Fu Yin and Fu Tao.
- Zhou Jie as Second Uncle Fu
- Li Yu Su as Second Aunt Fu

Sheng Household

- Hei Zi as Sheng Xiaojing
  - Historical prototype: Cheng Yaojin (程咬金)
  - Duke Lu of Great Tang. Father to Consort Han, Chumo, Chuling and Chujun. Rival of Lu Yun Ji.
- He Jia Yi as Madame Sheng
  - Wife of Duke of Lu. Mother to Consort Han, Chumo, Chuling and Chujun. Dotes and spoils on Chumo.
- Lin Peng as Princess Consort Han
  - Eldest daughter of Duke Lu. Wife of Prince Han.
- Kris Fan Shi Qi as Sheng Chuling
  - Historical prototype: Cheng Chuliang (程處亮)
  - Second son of the Duke of Lu, Second Young Master. Becomes a royal guard. Love interest of Princess Xin Nan.
- Zhou Da Wei as Sheng Chujun
  - Historical prototype: Cheng Chubi (程处弼)
  - Third son of the Duke of Lu, Third Young Master.

Lu Household

- Hou Yan Song as Lu Yunji
  - Historical prototype: Hou Junji (侯君集)
  - Great General Cai. Lu Qi and Lu Yingying's father. Rival of Duke Lu.
- He Feng Tian as Lu Qi
  - Eldest son of Lu Yunji and Lu Yingying's older brother. Rival of Sheng Chumo. Likes Fu Yin.
- He Rui Xian as Lu Yingying
  - Younger daughter of Lu Yunji and sister of Lu Qi. Possesses a bright and pure mind, unlike her brother and father and is extremely filial to the both of them. Develops an unrequited love for Yan Zifeng knowing he views her family as the enemy.
- Yan Xi Dong as Lu Hanxing, cousin of Lu Qi.
- Shi Yu Fei as Linglong, personal handmaid of Lu Qi.
- Song Jian Xin as Lu Family Servant.

Sun Household

- Shen Baoping as Sun Tan
  - Secretary Sun. Father of Sun Lingshu and Sun Lingwei.
- Jiang Meng Jie as Sun Lingshu, Crown Princess of Li Kaiqing
  - Historical prototype: Crown Princess Su (太子妃苏氏)
  - Eldest daughter of Sun Tan, First Miss of the Sun family. Became the crown princess with the help of Fu Rou. After entering the palace, she becomes spiteful and narrow-minded, causing her relationship with the Crown Prince to deteriorate.
- Huang Xinyao as Sun Lingwei
  - Second daughter of Sun Tan, Second Miss of the Sun family. Biological younger sister of Sun Lingshu who often visits her in the Eastern Palace. Love interest of Chujun.

Imperial Family

- Ma Yue as Emperor
  - Historical prototype: Emperor Taizong of Tang (唐太宗李世民)
- Miao Pu as Empress
  - Historical prototype: Empress Zhangsun (長孫皇后)
  - A virtuous and kind empress who values Fu Rou for her talent.
- Li Ze Feng as Crown Prince Li Kaiqing
  - Historical prototype: Li Chengqian (李承乾)
  - Eldest son of the Emperor and Empress. Has a great relationship with his biological siblings Princess Xinnan and Prince Han a strained relationship with Prince Zhou. Shares a close friendship with Chen Ji and a maternal bond with Court Lady Situ.
- Liu Enshang as Prince Han
  - Historical prototype: Li Tai (李泰)
  - Fourth son of the Emperor by his Empress. Loves literature. A loyal and caring husband to Princess Consort Han.
- Shi Yue Anxin as Prince Qin
  - Historical prototype: Li Zhi, Emperor Gaozong of Tang (唐高宗李治)
  - Ninth son of the Emperor and his Empress. Respects Fu Rou and becomes her student.
- Wu Jiayi as Princess Xin Nan
  - Historical prototype: Li Jing, Princess Qinghe (清河公主) / Princess Yuzhang (豫章公主)
  - Beloved eleventh daughter of the Emperor. Close relationship with her brother the Crown Prince. Mischievous but naive. Love interest of Chuling.
- Katherine Yang as Princess Si Ling
  - Historical prototype: Princess Chengyang (城阳公主)
  - Wife of Huo Jing.
- Liu Min as Consort Yan
  - Historical prototype: Consort Yang (楊妃), daughter of Emperor Yang of Sui.
  - Consort of the Emperor and Prince Zhou's birth mother.
- Tan Jianci as Prince Zhou
  - Historical prototype: Li Ke (李恪)
  - Third son of the Emperor by his concubine Consort Yan. Knowledgeable but carefree and selfish in his pursuit of Fu Rou.
- Chang Long as Prince Zhao
  - Historical prototype: Li You (李祐)
  - Fifth son of the Emperor by his concubine Consort Xi.
- Tang Zeng as Prince Liang
  - Historical prototype: Li Yuanchang (李元昌)
  - Son of Taishang Huang and uncle to Crown Prince, Prince Han, Qin, Zhou and Princess Xin Nan. A cruel, careless and lecherous individual.
- as Li Baolin
  - Initially an Embroidery Bureau Official who caught the attention of the Emperor due to Fu Rou's assistance. After receiving the Emperor's favour, she is promoted to Baolin (寶林) and becomes good friends with Fu Rou.
- Yang Ruo Xi as Concubine Xi
  - Historical prototype: Consort Yin (妃 陰氏)
  - Concubine of the Emperor and Prince Zhao's birth mother.
- Michelle Bai Bing as Consort Qiao
- Liu Yu Xin as Consort Zhen
- Wang Ya Jing as Jiang Cai Ren
- Lei Han as Taishang Huang (Retired Emperor)
  - Historical prototype: Emperor Gaozu of Tang (唐高祖李淵)
  - Predecessor and father of the current Emperor of Tang. Dotes and favours Prince Liang.
- Fang Xiao Li as Dowager Consort Su
  - Historical prototype: Concubine Sun (嬪 孫氏)
  - Taishang Huang's consort and Prince Liang's birth mother.
- Angela Pan as Dowager Consort Wan
  - Historical prototype: Wan Guifei (萬貴妃 (唐朝))
  - Taishang Huang's consort.

Court Ladies

- Zhang Tong as Situ Shangyi
  - Well respected and stern senior court lady of the Imperial Palace. Profoundly trusted by the Empress, Crown Prince and Princess Consort Han. Secretly protects Fu Rou in the palace.
- Zhang Ting Ting as Wu Shangyi
  - Situ Shangyi's secretary. After Situ Shangyi's departure, she took over her position.
- Liu Xiao Ye as Court Lady Xue
  - Fu Rou's subordinate under the Embroidery Bureau.
- Fang Anna as Court Lady Yuan
  - Fu Rou's subordinate under the Embroidery Bureau.
- Sun Dan Dan as Li Dian Yan
  - Fu Rou's subordinate under the Department division of Communication.

Servants

- Wang Yizhe as Chen Ji / Fu Shui
  - Historical prototype: Chen Xin (稱心)
  - Chen Ji: An entertainer of Prince Han's manor who becomes a close friend of the Crown Prince. Because of his low status and in order to maintain the Crown Prince's reputation he willingly commits suicide.
  - Fu Shui: A mysterious man with ulterior motives. Manipulative and duplicitous in nature.
- Zhang Yi Xi as Xiao Lu
  - Historical prototype: Wu Ze Tian (武则天)
  - A maid at befriends Fu Rou. Later becomes her personal maid as well as her student.
- Zhang Jie as Shu'er
  - Fu Rou's maid.
- An An as Zhenzhu
  - Princess Xin Nan's maid.
- Huang Jia Rong as Shu Ang Xi
  - Sun Lingshu's maid.
- Sun Di as Wei Sun
  - Attendant of the Empress.
- Hu Wen Zhe as Yang Bai
  - A eunuch in the palace who helps Fu Rou many times.
- Owen Chen Feng as Yu He
  - Consort Yan's servant.
- Jackie Li Yang Zi as Ma Hainiu
  - Sister of Ma Haihu and Yan Zifang's subordinate. Has unrequited love for Sheng Chumo.

Ministers

- Hong Yao as Yan Zifang / Fan Ziyan
  - Previously betrothed to Fu Rou at a young age, before falling into a lake to escape Lu Yunji's subordinates and was presumed dead. However, he was saved and adopted by pirates of the Four Seas Gang. In order to avenge Lu Yunji for exterminating his biological family, he cooperates with Chu Mo to obtain the Emperor's call of peace and obtains the title General Zhenhai.
- Zheng Long as Ma Haihu
  - Yan Zifang's most trusted subordinate and Lieutenant. Ma Hainu's brother.
- He Lei as Du Ning
  - Chumo's friend who is skilled in painting and calligraphy. After recognised for his talents by the Emperor himself, he is promoted to an Official in the Imperial Academy. Had mutual feelings for Fu Yin before she abandoned him to seek revenge on the Lu family.
- Sun Ning as Fang Xun, Chang Guo Gong
  - Crown Prince's mentor who was later imprisoned and replaced by Zhan Xuanzhi.
- He Qiang as Fang Qianli
  - Historical prototype: Fang Xuanling (房玄龄)
- Fang Da Lu as Yu Xuanzhi
  - Imperial Chief Examiner who saw potential in Du Ning. Replaced Chang Guo Gong's position.
- Chen Guo Dong as Qian Wenjing
  - Originally Prince Zhou's mentor.
- Luo Ting as Zhang Ming Gong

Other

- Li Chuan Yuan as Li Fuling
  - A close friend of Princess Xin Nan and was a candidate for the position of Crown Princess with Lu Yingying and Sun Lingshu.
- Liu Lu as Lian Yan'er
  - A former famous courtesan. She becomes an obstacle used by Sheng Chumu to make Fu Ruo forget him.
- Wang Yi Jun as Zhang He
  - Hangs around Prince Liang and Huo Jing. Violates his high status by oppressing other people including Yan Zifang. Later punished by Yan Zifang.
- Hou Jun Guang as Huo Jing
  - Historical prototype: Du He (杜荷), Princess Chengyang's husband.
  - Hangs around Prince Liang, Lu Qi and Zhang He. Violates his high status by oppressing other people.
- Wang Jianguo as Hong Yide
  - Commander of the rebel army.

== Production ==
The series is co-produced by Huanyu Film and TVB. It is helmed by the production team of Story of Yanxi Palace, which includes producer and visual director Yu Zheng, executive producer Li Xiuzhen, style director Song Xiaotao and art director Luan Hexin. The script is written by Feng Nong (General and I).

The series began filming in February 2019 at Hengdian World Studios.

== Awards and nominations ==
Award	Category	Nominee	Results	Ref.
China Entertainment Industry Summit (Golden Pufferfish Awards)	Most Anticipated Program	Ode to Daughter of Great Tang	Nominated	
