= Lemon Zhang =

Chinese actress and singer

Zhang Meng 张檬
- Born: 29 December 1988 (age 37); Zhengzhou, Henan, People's Republic of China
- Other name: Lemon Zhang
- Education: Beijing Film Academy
- Occupations: Actor; singer; model
- Years active: 2003–present
- Agent: Zhang Meng Studio

Chinese name
- Traditional Chinese: 張檬
- Simplified Chinese: 张檬
Transcriptions
Standard Mandarin
- Hanyu Pinyin: Zhāng Méng
- Wade–Giles: Chang Meng

Zhang Meng (Chinese: 张檬, born on 29 December 1988 in Zhengzhou), also known as Lemon Zhang, is a Chinese actress, singer and model. She graduated from Beijing Film Academy.

== Career ==
Zhang first gained attention for her role as Biyao in the music video of the online video game Jade Dynasty in 2007.

In 2009, she portrayed Zhu'er in The Heaven Sword and Dragon Saber, based on Louis Cha's novel of the same name. Producer Zhang Jizhong praised her for being dedicated, and said she had great potential.

In 2010, Zhang was invited by Yu Zheng to star in historical drama The Firmament of the Pleiades. The series earned high ratings in Japan and was nominated at the Seoul International Drama Awards, earning Zhang recognition.

In 2011, Zhang starred in the metropolitan drama My Daughter, portraying one of the three female protagonists alongside Tiffany Tang and Qi Wei. The series earned high ratings, and led to an increase in popularity for Zhang. The same year, she portrayed Princess Wansheng in Journey to the West.

In 2012, Zhang starred alongside Eddie Peng in the Taiwanese idol drama My Sassy Girl. She also starred in the wuxia drama The Magic Blade. The series was popular among young viewers, earning both high ratings and popular views. Zhang was also nominated for Most Popular Actress at the Shanghai Television Festival.

In 2013, Zhang played the role of Wang Yuyan in The Demi-Gods and Semi-Devils, adapted from Louis Cha's novel. The same year, she was cast in another television adaptation of Louis Cha's novel, The Deer and the Cauldron, portraying Shuang'er.

In 2014, Zhang guest-starred in xianxia drama Swords of Legends as Ma Tianyu's older sister, and received positive reviews for her performance.

== Filmography ==
=== Film ===
Year	English title	Chinese title	Role	Notes/Ref.
2004	Jin Du 1943	金都1943	Xiao Man	
2006	Empyreal Doctor	苍生大医	Lan Lan	
2007	Crazy in Love	意乱情迷	Xiao Zhen	
2008		刺青怨	Cui Yun	
2008	The Deserted Inn	荒村客栈	Ouyang Xiaozhi	
2008		国球女孩	Chen Na	
2010	Virtual Recall	异空危情	Lan Xiaoli	
2011	My Own Swordsman	武林外传	Chi Chi	
2013	Love Distance	爱别离	Xiao Meng	
2016	Three Bad Guys	恋爱教父之三个"坏"家伙	Xiao Xun	
2019	Autumn Fairy Tale	蓝色生死恋		

=== Television series ===
Year	English title	Chinese title	Role	Notes	Notes/Ref.
2006		寻找庐山恋	Han Xiaoxiao		
2007		远东第一监狱	Zhang Xiaoyu		
2007	Love in Future	爱在来时	Guan Yue		
2007	The Last Bullet	最后的子弹	Wang Hua		
2009		杂技皇后夏菊花	Xia Juhua		
2009	The Heaven Sword and Dragon Saber	倚天屠龙记	Yin Li / Zhu Er		
2010	The Firmament of the Pleiades	苍穹之昴	Consort Zhen		
2010	Pretty Maid	大丫鬟	Fang Xinyi		
2010		包三姑外传	Shu Ling'er		
2010	Beauty's Rival in Palace	美人心计	Wei Zifu		Guest appearance
2010	The Legend of Crazy Monk	活佛济公	Xin Lan		
2011	My Daughters	夏家三千金	Yang Zhenzhen		
2011	The Great Time	大时代	Xue Guo		
2011	Journey to the West	西游记	Wansheng Princess		
2011	Beauty World	唐宫美人天下	Xuan Yu		
2012		正者无敌	Shu Ping		
2012	My Sassy Girl	牵牛的夏天	Tong Xiaoxia		
2012	The Magic Blade	天涯明月刀	Zhou Ting		
2012	The Queen of SOP	胜女的代价	Zeng Chuchu		
2012	Beauty Without Tears	美人无泪	Hai Lanzhu		
2013	New Age of Love	新恋爱时代	Chen Jia		
2013	The Spies	穷追不舍	Xu Xiaoyue		
2013	The Demi-Gods and Semi-Devils	天龙八部	Wang Yuyan		
2013		鸳鸯佩	Jin Yongen		
2014	Marry Him Or Not	不是不想嫁	Liu Leilei		
2014	Swords of Legends	古剑奇谭	Fang Ruqin		Special appearance
2014	80s Engagement	大都市小爱情	Guo Guo		Cameo
2014	The Deer and the Cauldron	鹿鼎記	Shuang'er		
2015	Detectives and Doctors	陸小鳳與花滿樓	Ah Xin		
2015	The Four	少年四大名捕	Hui Lan		Guest appearance
2015	Starry Night	隐秘动机	Jiang Zhen		
2015	A Scholar Dream of Woman	碧血书香梦	Shen Biyun		
2015	Legend of Ban Shu	班淑传奇	Yue Jin		Special appearance
2016	The Ladder of Love	爱的阶梯	Chen Qiuyan		
2016		百炼成爹	Wu Jing		
2017	Legend of Kaifengfu	开封府传奇	Yu Rou		
2017	The Kite	风筝	Cheng Zhen'er		
2018	Won't Let Go Of Your Hand	绝不松开你的手	Zheng Haijun's wife		
2018	Woman in Love	海上嫁女记	He Bingbing		
2018	Woman in Beijing	北京女子图鉴	Wang Jiajia		
2018		幸福起航	Wu Jing		
2018	Forever Young	怒放的青春	Liu Man		
2018	The Sea Silk Road	沧海丝路	Yan Caizhu		

== Discography ==
=== Albums ===
Year	English title	Chinese title	Language	Notes
2012	Her Love	檬懂了	Mandarin	

=== Soundtrack appearances ===
Year	English title	Chinese title	Album	Notes
2013	"Fall in Love with You"	爱上你	Love Distance OST	
2013	"A Flower's Strength"	花的坚强	Yuan Yang Pei OST	
2015	"Cried and Hated"	哭过恨过	The Ladder of Love OST	
