= The Demi-Gods and Semi-Devils (2013 TV series) =

2013 Chinese TV series

- 天龙八部
- Genre: Wuxia
- Based on: Demi-Gods and Semi-Devils by Jin Yong
- Screenplay by: Wei Xin; Liu Shuhua
- Directed by: Lai Shui-ching; Ma Yuk-sing; Lung Siu-kei; Liu Guohui; Deng Yancheng
- Presented by: Wu Dun; Zhao Yifang
- Starring: Wallace Chung; Kim Ki-bum; Han Dong; Lemon Zhang; Jia Qing; Zong Fengyan; Mao Xiaodan; Zhao Yuanyuan; Canti Lau
- Opening theme: "Demi-Gods and Semi-Devils" (天龙八部) by Shin and Lai Shui-ching
- Ending theme: "Love Me Well" (好好爱爱我吧) by Liu Chia-chang
- Composers: Lin Hai; Feng Shuo; Liu Chia-chang
- Country of origin: China
- Original language: Mandarin
- No. of episodes: 54

Production
- Executive producers: Sheng Linzhen; Liang Dong; Xie Qi
- Producers: Wu Dun; Chen Pinxiang
- Production location: Xiangshan Film City
- Cinematography: Ouyang Liangjing; Chen Guowen
- Running time: ≈45 minutes per episode
- Production companies: Zhejiang Hua Ce Media; Dong Yang Da Qian Media

Original release
- Network: Hunan TV
- Release: 22 December 2013 – January 2014

The Demi-Gods and Semi-Devils (天龙八部) is a Chinese wuxia television series adapted from the novel Demi-Gods and Semi-Devils by Jin Yong. Directed by Lai Shui-ching and others, it starred Wallace Chung, Kim Ki-bum, Han Dong, Lemon Zhang and Jia Qing. Shooting for the series started on 10 November 2012, and the series was first aired on Hunan TV on 22 December 2013.

== Cast ==
- Wallace Chung as Qiao Feng / Xiao Yuanshan (young)
- Kim Ki-bum as Duan Yu
- Han Dong as Xuzhu
- Lemon Zhang as Wang Yuyan
- Jia Qing as Azhu / Azi
- Zong Fengyan as Murong Fu
- Mao Xiaotong as Zhong Ling
- Zhao Yuanyuan as Mu Wanqing
- Canti Lau as Duan Zhengchun
- Viann Zhang as Kang Min
- Alec Su as Wuyazi
- Alyssa Chia as Li Qiushui
- Gao Yuanyuan as Li Qiushui's sister (Li Biyun)
- Jin Ming as Tianshan Tonglao
- Wang Jianxin as Yelü Hongji
- Lu Yong as Jiumozhi
- Wang Gang as Ding Chunqiu
- Liu Chao as You Tanzhi
- Bryan Leung as Xiao Yuanshan
- Feng Jingao as Murong Bo
- Eddy Ko as the Sweeper Monk
- Du Yuming as Duan Yanqing
- Lin Yizheng as Yue Laosan
- Meng Xia as Ye Erniang
- Ji Wei as Yun Zhonghe
- Yan Qingyu as Dao Baifeng
- Sylvia Cheung as Ruan Xingzhu
- Florence Tan as Gan Baobao
- Shu Yan as Qin Hongmian
- Lai Shui-ching as Wang Jiantong
- Hua Jiao as Abi
- Li Yuan as Feng Bo'e
- Hou Jie as Bao Butong
- Wang Kun as Zhu Danchen
- Wang Zhengjia as Chu Wanli
- Liu Simeng as Granny Ping
- Sun Lufei as Granny Rui
- Sunny Ng Wah-sun as Quan Guanqing
- Hugo Ng as Zhong Wanchou
- Zhang Mingming as Zhuo Bufan
- Chen Zihan as Xiao Yuanshan's wife
- Gongsun Min as Xuanci
- Wang Yahui as Princess Yinchuan
- Guo Kaimin as Duan Zhengming
- Wang Xuanyu as Li Qingluo (Madam Wang)
- Min Zheng as Ma Dayuan
- Gao Yuqing as Bai Shijing
- Han Zhenhua as Su Xinghe
- Shen Baoping as Huangmei
