= Hankiz Omar =

Chinese actress

Hanikezi
- Born: Hankiz Omar خانقىز ئۆمەر; January 29, 1996 (age 30); Ürümqi, Xinjiang, China
- Education: Xinjiang Arts Institute
- Occupations: Actress; dancer; model
- Years active: 2018–present
- Agent: Mountain Top Entertainment
- Height: 165 cm (5.41 ft)

Chinese name
- Chinese: 哈妮克孜
Transcriptions
Standard Mandarin
- Hanyu Pinyin: Hā Nī Kè Zī

Hankiz Omar (Uyghur: خانقىز ئۆمەر, Chinese: 哈妮克孜; pinyin: Hā Nī Kè Zī) is a Chinese actress, dancer and model of Uyghur ethnicity, who first rose to prominence in 2018 for participating in IQIYI's show The Chinese Youth.

== Early life ==
Hanikezi was born on January 29, 1996, to a Uyghur family in Ürümqi, Xinjiang. Her name, Hankiz, means "leader among women" in Uyghur language. After graduating from high school, she joined a PLA military arts troupe for two years as an actress while studying at the Xinjiang Arts Institute.

== Career ==
In 2018, Hanikezi was discovered and signed by Beijing-based Mountain Top Entertainment, and thus officially started her acting career. In October, Hanikezi participated in IQIYI's The Chinese Youth (國風美少年). Although she was eventually eliminated from the show, she gained popularity and attention nationwide thanks to her performance of "A Dream of Dunhuang".

On January 1, 2019, Hanikezi participated in CCTV's New Year's Party, where she and Kazakhstani singer Dimash Kudaibergen performed the song "Mo Li Hua". She then took part in Hunan TV's Spring Festival Gala and performed group dance "The Silk Road" with several other artists.

In 2020, Hanikezi was cast as one of the leading role in the historical drama Dance of the Sky Empire. Later that year, she took part in various projects such as Song of Youth, Ancient Love Poetry, Ultimate Note, and the costume fantasy film Soul Snatcher.

== Filmography ==
=== Television series ===
Year	English title	Chinese title	Role	Network	Notes/Ref.
2020	Dance of the Sky Empire	天舞纪	Yun Shan	iQIYI	
2020	Ultimate Note	终极笔记	A Ning	iQIYI	

=== Film ===
Year	English title	Chinese title	Role	Notes/Ref.
2020	Soul Snatcher	赤狐书生	Yinglian	

=== Variety shows ===
Year	Title	Chinese title	Role	Notes
2023	Natural High	现在就出发	Recurring member	
