= Wu Jiayi =

Chinese actress (born 1995)

- Born: 1 December 1995 (age 30); Jinhua, Zhejiang
- Education: Central Academy of Drama
- Occupation: Actress
- Years active: 2014–present
- Agent: Huanyu Film
- Height: 166 cm (5 ft 5 in)

Chinese name
- Simplified Chinese: 吴佳怡
- Traditional Chinese: 吳佳怡
Transcriptions
Standard Mandarin
- Hanyu Pinyin: Wú Jiāyí

Wu Jiayi (Chinese: 吴佳怡; born 1 December 1995) is a Chinese actress.

== Career ==
In 2016, Wu made her small-screen debut in the period romance television series Demon Girl. The same year, she was cast in the shenmo television series Zhaoge, playing Yi Jiang.

In 2017, Wu was cast in her first leading role in the shenmo television series Legend of Nezha, portraying Xiao Longnu.

In 2018, Wu starred in the historical romance drama Untouchable Lovers.

In 2019, Wu gained recognition after starring in fantasy drama Novoland: Eagle Flag as a bold and cheerful princess, and in youth military drama Arsenal Military Academy where she played a spoilt actress.

In 2020, Wu played leading roles in the shenmo drama Heroic Journey of Nezha, as well as palace drama Love Story of Court Enemies; and historical fantasy drama Dance of the Sky Empire.

== Filmography ==
=== Film ===
Year	English title	Chinese title	Role	Notes
2014	Gan Lu	甘露	Niu Chun	
2015	Digong Hou Gongdui	敌后文工队	Tang Huiling	
2015	The Wind Uprise	起风了		Short film
2016	Out of Ordinary	非同小可	A Xiang	

=== Television series ===
Year	English title	Chinese title	Role	Notes
2016	Demon Girl II	半妖倾城II	Dong Ge	
2017	Full House of Happiness	老爸当家	Du Du	
2018	Untouchable Lovers	凤囚凰	Qing Yue	
2019	Novoland: Eagle Flag	九州缥缈录	Ying Yu	
2019	Arsenal Military Academy	烈火军校	Qu Manting	
2020	Heroic Journey of Nezha	哪咤降妖记	Xiao Longnu	
2020	Love Story of Court Enemies	那江烟花那江雨	Zhao Yuxing	
2020	Dance of the Sky Empire	天舞纪	Su Youlian	
2020	Ode to Daughter of Great Tang	大唐儿女行	Princess Qinghe	
2024	In Blossom	花间令	Bai Xiaosheng	
TBA	Zhaoge	朝歌	Yi Jiang	
TBA	Hello, My Opponent 2	你好，对方辩友2		

== Discography ==
Year	English title	Chinese title	Album	Notes
2019	"Moonlight Tango"	月光探戈	Arsenal Military Academy OST	

== Awards ==
Year	Award	Ceremony	Nominated work	Ref.
2017	3rd Asia Microfilm Art Festival	Outstanding Supporting Actress	The Wind Uprise	
