= Zhaoge (TV series) =

Chinese name
- Traditional Chinese: 夢回朝歌
- Simplified Chinese: 梦回朝歌
Transcriptions
Standard Mandarin
- Hanyu Pinyin: Mèng Huí Zhāogē
- Genre: Historical fiction Shenmo
- Written by: Yu Zheng
- Directed by: Li Dachao; Liu Zhenming; Ren Haiyao; Zhu Lihe
- Starring: Zhang Zhehan; Wu Jinyan; Bao Jianfeng; Gillian Chung; Merxat; Wu Jiayi; Bai Lu; He Fengtian
- Country of origin: China
- Original language: Mandarin
- No. of episodes: 50

Production
- Executive producer: Yu Zheng
- Production locations: Hengdian World Studios, Xinjiang, Kyoto
- Production companies: Huanyu Film; Cathay Media; Mango TV; Media Asia Film

Original release
- Network: iQiyi

Zhaoge (simplified Chinese: 梦回朝歌; traditional Chinese: 夢回朝歌; pinyin: Mèng Huí Zhāogē) is an upcoming Chinese television series written and produced by Yu Zheng; starring Zhang Zhehan and Wu Jinyan. The series is set in the later years of Shang dynasty, and revolves around Ji Fa's life as a hostage in Zhaoge and his journey to become a legendary ruler. It involves fantasy elements originating from the 16th-century novel Investiture of the Gods.

== Synopsis ==
During the Shang dynasty, the capital of China was moved to Zhaoge in the hopes that the city would grow prosperous. However, by the reign of King Zhou of Shang, the livelihood of the people was driven into a desperate state due to warfare. Thankfully, the son of King Zhou of Shang, also had the son of King Wen of Zhou, Ji Kao, in his hands. Ji Kao was on good terms with the son of King Zhou, Yin Jiao, who wished to save the people from their plight. Ji Kao eventually set up and degraded to the status of a slave but was saved by Yin Jiao. While fleeing, Ji Kao met Jiang Ziya, Nezha, and Yang Jian who assisted him.

Years later, Ji Kao had changed names to Ji Fa and led eight hundred feudal princes to suppress King Zhou, leading to the destruction of the Shang dynasty. Yin Jiao turned on Ji Fa, who he accused of leading his mother to her death. This eventually led to Yin Jiao's suicide. Ji Fa eventually ascended and became King Wu of Zhou, remembering to keep in mind his shared dream with Yin Jiao to lift the people towards a better future.

== Cast ==
Actor	Character	Introduction
Zhang Zhehan	Ji Fa	Prince of Xiqi State. Second son of King Wen of Zhou and Tai Si. Later the King Wu of Zhou. He was held as a hostage in Zhaoge. Possessing great magnanimity and lofty ambitions, he later becomes a great ruler. Daji is his one true love.
Wu Jinyan	Daji / Yue Hao / Youji	Daughter of Su Hu. Reincarnation of a fox demon. A woman who possesses great beauty, innocence and kindness. Her first and one true love is Ji Fa. However after she becomes possessed by her previous reincarnation, her temperament undergoes a huge change and she became cunning and manipulative. She enters the palace and quickly ascends to power as the favorite consort of Di Xin.
Bao Jianfeng	Di Xin	Last Emperor of the Shang dynasty. A well-versed man with outstanding abilities, he played a huge part in expanding the territory of Shang. However, he later falls prey to seduction, and becomes an incapable ruler. Daji is his favorite consort and he would do anything for her.
Gillian Chung	He Sang	Queen of Yu tribe. She values both power and love equally. She loves Wu Geng deeply.
Merxat	Wu Geng	Son of Di Xin. A talented young prince who is trapped with between his political opponents and the suspicions of his father. He wants to become the Emperor not for power, but to protect his one true love, Yi Jiang. Later being unable to stand the oppression, he begins taking revenge on the people who wronged him.
Wu Jiayi	Yi Jiang	Daughter of Jiang Ziya, later the Empress of Zhou (Ji Fa's wife). In order to become a skilled physician, she sneaks into the palace to seek education. There, she befriends both Ji Fa and Wu Geng, and falls in love with Ji Fa.
Bai Lu	Deng Chanyu	A noble lady of birth. Tu Xingsun's wife.
He Fengtian	Shen Gongbao	Advisor of Shang Dynasty. Jiang Ziya's junior fellow apprentice. Despite appearing on good terms with Jiang Ziya, he secretly harbors a grudge toward him due to frequent comparisons between the two. Later, due to Daji's incitement, he turned against Jiang Ziya and Ji Fa.
Lian Lian	Consort Chen	Consort of Di Xin. Huang Feihu's younger sister. She loves her husband deeply, and becomes immensely jealous of Daji.
Lin Youwei	Jiang Ziya	A noble man who helped Ji Fa overthrow the Shang dynasty and build a new dynasty.
Chen Shu	Nüwa	A goddess in ancient Chinese mythology, who punishes Di Xin for his wrongdoings.
Liu Min	Chao Xi	Queen Zhou of Shang. Di Xin's wife.
Li Yitong	Hu Xian'er	Previous reincarnation of Daji. A fox spirit from the Xuanyuan graves.
Jiang Yiyi	Ling'er	
Puff Kuo	Yan Jiu	
Hai Lu	Yun Jin	
Zheng Guolin	Ji Chang	Ji Fa's father.
Shiyue Anxi	Nezha	Son of Li Jing. A protector deity.
Wang Maolei	Li Jing	Pagoda-Bearing Heavenly King Li. Father of Nezha.
Bai Yu	Professor Li	
Sun Shaolong	Tu Xingsun	
Xu Kai	Yang Jian	Jiang Ziya's capable right-hand-man. The strongest general of Xiqi State.
Nan Fulong	Huang Feihu	A general of Shang Dynasty.
Hong Yao	Yun Teng	
Wang Yizhe	Leizhenzi	Godson of Ji Chang.
Deng Sha	Ma Yingshuang	
Wen Zhengrong	Madame Si	
Chen Xiuli	Pianpian	
Gao Yu'er	Heyin	
Zhang Nan	Dragon Lady	
Zhao Yiqin	Dragon Prince	
Liu Zhiyang	Grandmaster of Heaven	Leader of Jie Taoism sect.
Zhang Jianing	Qimeng	
He Hongshan	Host	
Liu Enshang	A'bao	
Yang Caiying	Aunt	
Liu Qiwei	Wizard	
Yang Yulan	Yan Jiu's grandmother	

== Production ==
Shooting began on September 13, 2016 in Kanas Lake, Xinjiang Uygur Autonomous Region. The series wrapped up filming on February 7, 2017 at Hengdian. The series reportedly took 300 million yuan to produce, with six months of filming and eight months of pre-production.

The series is written and produced by Yu Zheng, who also works as the art director. Directors Liu Zhenming and Ren Haiyao previously worked with Yu in the web series Demon Girl. Lun Pengbo who worked on Mojin: The Lost Legend acts as the visual effects director, and He Jian of The Glory of Tang Dynasty was appointed the costumes designer. Yu Zheng also engaged history professors, host of Lecture Room and archaeology professors to ensure that the television series is as accurate to real-life history as possible.
