= The Eternal Love =

2017 Chinese television series

- Promotional poster
- Genre: Romance comedy Time travel Historical
- Based on: Bao Xiao Chong Fei: Ye Wo Deng Ni Xiu Qi by Fan Que
- Written by: Yang Shiye
- Directed by: Tak Yuen
- Starring: Liang Jie; Xing Zhaolin
- Country of origin: China
- Original language: Mandarin
- No. of seasons: 3
- No. of episodes: 24 (Season 1); 30 (Season 2); 30 (Season 3)

Production
- Running time: 35 mins
- Production company: Tencent Penguin Pictures

Original release
- Network: Tencent Video
- Release: July 10, 2017

The Eternal Love (Chinese: 双世宠妃) is a 2017 Chinese television series based on the novel Bao Xiao Chong Fei: Ye Wo Deng Ni Xiu Qi (Chinese: 爆笑宠妃：爷我等你休妻) by Fan Que. The series stars Liang Jie and Xing Zhaolin, and aired on Tencent Video from July 10 to August 15, 2017. The second season aired on Tencent Video from October 22 to December 3, 2018. The third season aired on Tencent Video from June 1 to June 14, 2021.

The low budget drama was an unexpected hit when it aired in China.

== Synopsis ==
An unforeseen event changes the life of Qu Tan'er (Liang Jie), after a suicide attempt over her love for Mo Yihuai (Wang Ruichang). She wakes up to find that another person has entered her body named Qu Xiaotan, who has time-traveled from the modern world. Both girls share a different personality, with Qu Tan'er being gentle and submissive while Qu Xiaotan is wild and uninhibited; whenever one of them tells a lie, the other takes over their shared body. Duty forces Qu Tan'er to marry Mo Liancheng (Xing Zhaolin), thus beginning an unexpected romance between two people thrown together by circumstance: in fact, as Tan'er persists in her love for Yihuai, Liancheng falls in love with modern girl Xiaotan.

== Cast ==
=== Main ===
Actor	Character	Introduction
Liang Jie	Qu Tan'er	Second daughter of the Qu family.
Liang Jie	Qu Xiaotan	A property agent living in the 21st century, who accidentally time-travels back to the era of Dongyue Kingdom.
Xing Zhaolin	Mo Liancheng	8th prince of Dongyue Kingdom who appears as a frail scholar, but is skilled in martial arts.

=== Supporting ===
==== Qu family ====
Actor	Character	Introduction
Zhong Qi	Qu Pan'er	First daughter of the Qu family, and Mo Yihuai's wife.

==== Dongyue Kingdom Royal Family ====
Actor	Character	Introduction
Wang Ruichang	Mo Yihuai	1st prince of Dongyue Kingdom, and was in a relationship with Qu Tan'er.
Wang Ruichang	Mo Yifeng	Founder and the first king of Dongyue Kingdom. Mo Yihuai, Mo Liancheng and Mo Jingxuan's grandfather.
Wang Haoge	Mo Jingxuan	14th prince of Dongyue Kingdom, who has a close relationship with Mo Liancheng.

==== Others ====
Actor	Character	Introduction
Sun Yining	Jing Xin	Qu Tan'er's personal maid.
Xin Ruiqi	Zhao Qingyun	Daughter of Marquis Anhou, who has a one-sided crush on Mo Liancheng.
Hu Chunyong	Yu Hao	Mo Liancheng's personal guard.

== Soundtrack ==
No.	Title	Singers	Length
1.	"九张机 The Eternal Love" (Theme song)	Ye Xuanqing
2.	"学到老爱到老 Learn and Love till Old Age" (Ending theme song)	Jin Runji
3.	"舍得 Bear To" (Ending theme song)	Wang Chengzhang
4.	"风一样的我 Wind Like Me"	Ye Xuanqing
5.	"不懂"	Gu Tian
6.	"原来我以为"	Wang Tao
7.	"Love Love"	Alilang Group, Jin Runji
8.	"走着走着就散了 My Love of You"	Ada Zhuang

== Production ==
Pre-production of the series began in November 2016. The production team from Tencent Penguin Pictures selected the novel due to several trending elements, such as "sweet and touching" romance and fantasy.

Shooting commenced in Hengdian World Studios on February 2, 2017 and wrapped up on March 27, 2017.

In November 2017, a second season was announced via Tencent Media Conference, with the original leads returning. It began filming in Guizhou on March 17, 2018 and wrapped up on May 14, 2018.

Shooting for season 3 commenced in Hengdian World Studios on June 7, 2020.

== Awards and nominations ==
Award	Category	Nominated work	Result	Ref.
12th Tencent Video Star Awards	Top Ten Series	The Eternal Love 2	Won	
