= One and Only (TV series) =

Chinese romantic television series

- Genre: Historical, Romance
- Based on: Yi Sheng Yi Shi Mei Ren Gu (一生一世美人骨) by Mo Bao Fei Bao
- Directed by: Guo Hu
- Presented by: Gong Yu, Zhao Yifang
- Starring: Ren Jialun; Bai Lu
- Ending theme: As It Is by Zhang Bichen
- Country of origin: China
- Original language: Mandarin
- No. of episodes: 24

Production
- Running time: 45 mins
- Production companies: iQIYI; Huace Film&TV; Xiamen Film Industry Service Center Co., Ltd.

Original release
- Network: iQIYI
- Release: August 18, 2021

One and Only (Chinese: 周生如故) is a 2021 Chinese period romantic television series starring Ren Jialun and Bai Lu. The series is based on the novel Yi Sheng Yi Shi Mei Ren Gu (一生一世美人骨) by Mo Bao Fei Bao. It is available on iQiyi and iQ.com from August 18, 2021. The series is followed by Forever and Ever. Both of them were adapted from the same novel, released back-to-back, and follows the same characters in different eras (one historical, one modern).

== Cast ==
=== Main ===
- Ren Jialun as Chen Zhousheng (Jr. Nanchen King, Cui Shi Yi's master), voiced by Bian Jiang
- Bai Lu as Cui Shiyi (daughter of Cui Family, Zhou Sheng Chen's eleventh protégé)

=== Supporting ===
- Wang Xingyue as Liu Zixing, historical prototype emperor Xiaozhuang of Northern Wei
- Li Yiru as Hong Xiaoyu
- Zhou Lula as Xiao Yan
- Yao Yichen as Cui Feng
- Su Mengyun as Feng Qiao
- Wu Mansi as Princess Xinghua
- Liu Weiwei as Cui Wenjun
- Fu Jun as Xie Chong
- Liang Aiqi as Qi Zhenzhen
- Yu Yang as Cui Guang
- Yuan Ruohang as Xie Yun
- Zhang Chenghang as Zhou Tianxing
- Wang Xinghan as Zhao Teng
- Zhang Zhang as Cheng Xi
- Han Chengyu as Huan Yu
- Xi Xue as Gao Huaiyang
- Dai Si as Jin Zhener

== Production ==
Filming of One and Only began in November 2020 and ended in January 2021.
