= Dance of the Sky Empire =

Chinese television series

- 天舞纪
- Genre: Comedy, Wuxia, historical
- Directed by: Zhao Jintao
- Starring: Xu Kai，Wu Jiayi， Hanikezi，Zhou Junchao，Li Junchen，Yu Xintong
- Country of origin: China
- Original language: Mandarin
- No. of episodes: 28

Production
- Production location: Heng Dian
- Running time: 45 mins

Original release
- Network: iQIYI
- Release: July 8, 2020

Dance of the Sky Empire (Chinese: 天舞纪; pinyin: Tiān Wû Jì) is a 2020 Chinese television series that set in Tang Dynasty. The series is adapted from Fantasy novel of the same name by writer Bu Feiyan and stars Xu Kai, Wu Jiayi, Hankiz Omar, Zhou Junchao, Li Junchen, and Yu Xintong.

It premieres on iQIYI globally with multi languages subtitles on 8 July 2020.

== Synopsis ==
The story is set against the backdrop of the prosperous Tang Dynasty in an era where humans and the Kunwu (an elfish, magic people with pointed ears and earth-based magic) coexisted. The story begins as a war ends in destruction, deception, and the humans trap the Dragon Emperor, ruler of the Kunwu. Li Xuan, a human and Kunwu hybrid, is more powerful than he knows and is cultivated into a powerful fighter by Lord Zi who runs Moyun Academy, which trains magical warriors for the human population. Su You Lian is a disguised Kunwu priestess who has come to study with the humans at Moyun Academy. She wants to release the Dragon Emperor and save the Kunwu from human genocide. During their time at Moyun Academy, Li Xuan and Su You Lian develop a complicated relationship because their feelings for each other develop and the world is still in a fragile place. Meanwhile, Li Xuan is unaware of his own hybrid nature (for the bulk of the story) and Su You Lian is focused on her task while finding her affection for Li Xuan distracting. Li Xuan starts out a tolerated bully and eventually becomes a hero to the people, and as the story progresses and he learns more about his past, he faces a dilemma of having to decide where his allegiance lies.

== Cast ==
=== Main ===
- Xu Kai as Li Xuan: he is half man and half demon.
- Wu Jiayi as Su You Lian
- Hankiz Omar as Yun Shan
- Zhou Junchao as Xiao Feng Ming
- Li Junchen as Yu Feng Mu
- Yu Xintong as Long Wei Er
