= The Actors of China Awards =

Annual television awards

- Current: 7th The Actors of China Awards
- Awarded for: Excellent acting in television
- Location: Yangzhou, Jiangsu; Chengdu, Sichuan
- Country: China
- Presented by: China Television Artists Association
- First award: 2014

The Actors of China Awards (Chinese: 中国电视好演员奖) are television awards presented annually by the China Television Artists Association. The awards recognize excellent actors and actresses in the Chinese television industry.

== History ==
The Actors of China Award was originally named "Image List of Chinese Television Actors" in 2014. It was renamed to "The Actors of China" in 2015. In 2016, the committee awards were added. The award ceremonies were hosted in Yangzhou in the first 4 years. In 2018, Chengdu acquired the right to host award ceremonies for the next 6 years.

== Award categories ==
=== Ballot awards ===
The ballot awards are divided into four main sections:

- The Ruby Award (Chinese: 红宝石奖), also known as The Best Actor/Actress of the Year Award in the Red Group, is awarded to actors/actresses over 55 years old.
- The Sapphire Award (Chinese: 蓝宝石奖), also known as The Best Actor/Actress of the Year Award in the Blue Group, is awarded to actors/actresses aged between 36 and 54
- The Emerald Award (Chinese: 绿宝石奖), also known as The Best Actor/Actress of the Year Award in the Green Group, is awarded to actors/actresses aged between 18 and 35.
- The Web Series Award (Chinese: 网剧组奖), also known as The Best Actor/Actress of the Year Award in the Web Series Group, is awarded to actors/actresses cast in the web series and aged between 18 and 40.

The steps for deciding the ballot awards are as follows:

- Step 1: A recommendation group consisting of performing artists, directors, producers, and screenwriters recommends candidate actors. After summarizing and reviewing, a list of candidates is determined and announced online.
- Step 2: The audience vote online. The top 6 with the highest votes for each category, a total of 48 people (4 sections, each section consisting of actor/actress categories), entered the finalist. In addition, these 48 people are all awarded with The Excellent Actor in the Actors of China (Chinese: 中国电视好演员优秀演员).
- Step 3: The committee select the final winners among 48 people through a non-anonymous ballot. The final winners will accept their awards in the ceremony.

=== Committee awards ===
In addition, the committee also decide other awards without ballot. The categories of committee awards vary in different years, including:

- The Committee Actor Award (Chinese: 评委会演员奖), also known as The Expert Award in the 3rd ceremony, recognizes senior artists.
- The Best Character Actor Award (Chinese: 最佳角色演员奖), recognizes actors who have never played any lead role in their long-term acting career, but have played classic "small roles".
- The Lifetime Achievement Actor Award (Chinese: 终身成就演员奖), also known as The Artistic Achievement Actor Award in the 7th ceremony.

== Ceremony ==
Edition	Date	Venue City	Refs
1st	April 18, 2014	Yangzhou, Jiangsu	
2nd	December 27, 2015	Yangzhou, Jiangsu	
3rd	December 28, 2016	Yangzhou, Jiangsu	
4th	January 12, 2018	Yangzhou, Jiangsu	
5th	December 28, 2018	Chengdu, Sichuan	
6th	December 19, 2019	Chengdu, Sichuan	
7th	November 29, 2020	Chengdu, Sichuan	

== Award recipients ==
Edition	Ruby Award/Red Group	Sapphire Award/Blue Group	Emerald Award/Green Group	Web Series Award	Committee Actor Award	Best Character Actor Award	Lifetime Achievement Actor Award	Refs
2	Ma Shaohua, Yan Minqiu	Wang Zhifei, Zhang Guoqiang, Zhou Xun, Yan Ni	Yu Shaoqun, Liu Tao	—N/a	—N/a	—N/a	—N/a	
3	Ni Dahong, Peng Yu	Feng Yuanzheng, Song Jialun, Sa Rina, Jiang Hongbo	Hu Ge, Ma Su	Meng Asai, Wang Ning, Ai Xiaoqi, Gan Lu, Yuan Zhongfang, Xiao Yin	Liu Jia, Wang Liyun	Liu Lin, Wang Jinsong	—N/a	
4	Sun Chun, Liang Danni	Jin Dong, Zhang Luyi, Qin Hailu, Mei Ting	Tong Liya, Zhai Tianlin	Zhang Yishan, Lin Yushen, Jiao Junyan, Wang Zixuan	—N/a	Li Naiwen, Lu Yuan	Lü Zhong, Li Xuejian	
5	Liu Peiqi, Song Chunli	Liu Yijun, Calvin Li, Wan Qian, Zuo Xiaoqing	Yu Xiaoguang, Yang Mi	Nie Yuan, Pan Yueming, Qin Lan, Wu Jinyan	Liu Jing, Xu Di	Lei Kesheng, Zheng Yuzhi	—N/a	
6	Wu Gang, Chen Jin	Wang Kai, Zhang Xilin, Fu Jing, Yan Danchen	Zhu Yilong, Wang Xiaochen, Guan Xiaotong	Zeng Shunxi, Xing Zhaolin, Song Yiren, Chen Yuqi	Zhang Guoli, Han Tongsheng	Zhang Zhijian, Liu Mintao	—N/a	
7	Liang Guanhua, Cao Cuifen	Hu Jun, Chen Shu	Li Yifeng, Jiang Shuying	Zhang Ruoyun	Xi Meijuan	—N/a	Niu Ben	

Note: The Excellent Actor in the Actors of China is awarded to all 48 candidates completing the step-2 ballot, thus are not listed in the table. If a person entered the 48-candidate list but failed to win the final award, the award section of his/her wiki page can be recorded in either way: 1. Excellent Actor/Actress (won) or 2. Best Actor/Actress (nom)
