= Cry Me a Sad River =

2018 Chinese youth film

- Theatrical release poster
- Chinese: 悲伤逆流成河
- Literal meaning: Sadness flows like a river
- Hanyu Pinyin: Bēishāng nìliú chénghé
- Directed by: Luo Luo
- Written by: Guo Jingming; Luo Luo
- Starring: Zhao Yingbo; Ren Min; Xin Yunlai; Zhang Ruonan; Zhu Danni
- Music by: Yutaka Yamada
- Production company: Beijing Enlight Media
- Distributed by: Beijing Enlight Media
- Release date: September 21, 2018
- Running time: 105 minutes
- Country: China
- Language: Mandarin
- Box office: $52 million

Cry Me a Sad River is a 2018 Chinese coming-of-age drama film directed and co-written by Luo Luo. It is a loose adaptation of the novel of the same name by Guo Jingming. The film stars Zhao Yingbo, Ren Min, Xin Yunlai, Yan Zidong, Zhang Ruonan, and Zhu Danni. It follows Qi Ming and Yi Yao, childhood friends from the alleyways of Shanghai, whose growing affection becomes entangled with school bullying and rumors, ultimately leading to a tragic end.

Cry Me a Sad River was released on September 21, 2018.

== Plot ==
A series of school bullying incidents shatter what should have been a bright and youthful campus life for five protagonists. Qi Ming is a handsome, well-respected top student, while Yi Yao is labeled by others as a burden. Having grown up together, the two share a close bond. However, everything changes dramatically with the arrival of transfer student Tang Xiaomi. Rumors become a destructive weapon, subjecting Yi Yao to relentless torment and driving her life into darkness as she endures cruel bullying. Gu Senxi teaches Yi Yao to stand up against school violence, offering her a glimmer of hope. Yet, an unexpected tragedy involving Gu Senxiang once again plunges Yi Yao into despair.

== Cast ==
- Zhao Yingbo as Qi Ming
- Ren Min as Yi Yao
- Xin Yunlai as Gu Senxi
- Zhang Ruonan as Gu Senxiang
- Zhu Danni as Tang Xiaomi
- Vivian Wu as Lin Huafeng
- Tao Huimin as Lin Wanxin
- Lin Zhiyi as Gu Dan
- Lin Jiaqi as Wang Aiyu
- Song Wei as Hu Pei
- Ren Zhong as Teacher

== Production ==
Principal photography began on February 1, 2018 in Shanghai and wrapped on March 27, 2018.

== Release ==
Cry Me a Sad River was theatrically released in China on April 30, 2021.

== Reception ==
=== Box office ===
Cry Me a Sad River grossed CN¥78 million (US$10.8 million) in its three-day opening weekend in China.

=== Critical response ===
On the Chinese review aggregator Maoyan, more than 480,000 audiences rated this film and the average rating is 8.9/10.
