= Zhang Ruonan =

Chinese actress (born 1996)

- Zhang Ruonan in Live Up to Your Youth (2026)
- Born: November 14, 1996 (age 30); Wenzhou, Zhejiang, China
- Other name: Nannan
- Education: Hangzhou Dianzi University
- Occupations: Actress; model
- Years active: 2018–present
- Agent: Enlight Media
- Notable work: Gu Senxiang in Cry Me a Sad River; You Yongci in My Love; Xu Nian Love Life Light; Xu Lai in A Date with the Future; Li Xiaoyue in Born to be the One; Wen Yifan in The First Frost; Zhuang Zhuang in Live Up to Your Youth
- Height: 166 cm (5 ft 5 in)
- Honours: Asian Television Awards
- Website: iQIYI

Zhang Ruonan (Chinese: 章若楠, born 14 November 1996) is a Chinese actress and model. She is known for her roles in the films Cry Me a Sad River (2018), My Love (2021), and Love Life Light (2023); for the series A Date with the Future (2023), Love is Panacea (2023), My Boss (2024), The First Frost (2025), and Live Up to Your Youth (2026). She received nomination for Best Actress at the notable Asian Television Awards for her role in The First Frost.

Zhang ranks among the highest-grossing Chinese film actresses and is top 1 among actresses born after 1995; her movies My Love and Love Life Light, both collectively surpassed ¥1 billion at the box office.

In 2025, she was awarded at the Dragon TV Drama Quality Festival and iQIYI Night. She is regularly ranked in the "Top 10 C-Drama Artists in Global Market".

== Early life ==
Zhang was born in Wenzhou, Zhejiang. She completed her primary education in Shijiazhuang, the capital city of Hebei province, where her parents ran a business.

In 2015, Zhang studied graphic design at the Hangzhou Dianzi University. She worked as a model during college years and shared her portfolio on Weibo. She participated in a campus beauty contest and was selected among the "Top 30 Finalists", which led to modeling opportunities. She filmed a short movie advertisement for a Chinese airline during this time.

== Career ==
=== 2018–2019: Beginning ===
In 2017, Zhang was invited via a private message from the official Weibo account of the film Cry Me a Sad River to play a role in the project. The film is a realistic youth film focusing on the theme of school bullying, in which she portrayed "Gu Senxiang", who meets a tragic end after being bullied. The film won an award at the 4th German-Chinese Film Festival and received significant media attention. On 21 September 2018, the film, directed by Guo Jingming, was nationwide released, marking her lead debut.

=== 2020–present: Breakthrough and rising popularity ===
In 2020, Zhang made her small screen debut in iQIYI's romantic series Everyone Wants to Meet You, produced by Zhao Wei. The drama explores how emotional healing can emerge when people face their past wounds and learn to trust again, with Luo Xi—played by Zhang—portrayed as a bright, cheerful girl who helps the workaholic Zhang Min.

She starred in Youku's historical romantic comedy Love is All, where she portrayed Tan Lingyin, a writer and government official. The series shows how growth, trust and love are gradually established through misunderstandings and partnership, as two mismatched individuals navigate challenges together beneath a surface of light-hearted humour. In the realistic short film College Entrance Examination 2020, she portrayed as an aspiring student; this aired during the "National Day Gift: Hunan TV's Blue Moon Mid-Autumn Festival".

In December 2020, her fantasy romance film The End of Endless Love exceeded ¥200 million within five days, and the total box office revenue was ¥334 million. In the film, Zhang played Ji Ze, a folk singer struggling with depression who was healed by the character Xin Tang. She performed a song "Diary of Love" alongside Wei Daxun during Hunan TV's "Pinduoduo 12.12 Super Fighting Night".

In 2021, Zhang starred as Liang Nuo in the army-themed series The Glory of Youth, aired on Jiangsu Satellite TV. The series centers on a group of young people enlisting in the army, their gradual understanding of responsibility, sacrifice and collective honour in strict training and mission tests, and finally completes the transformation from ordinary youth to qualified soldiers and the firmness of faith.

She appeared in the emotional youth film My Love, alongside Greg Hsu, she played a character insecure due to a broken family. The film follows a love story that spans many years but has been misplaced, reflecting youth's choices, growth, reality, and the emotional process of learning to let go. My Love premiered across China, Singapore, Taiwan, South Korea, Brunei, North America, Europe, Australia, and New Zealand and was a commercial success, grossing ¥822 million at the box office.

She starred in the revolutionary historical film The Pioneer, directed by Xu Zhanxiong. In August 2021, she starred in the female-oriented drama Be Yourself, portraying a girl raised in luxury who exhibits "princess syndrome". The series tells the story of four girls starting university and traces their growth and experiences over four years on campus. For this role, she won the Breakthrough Actress of the Year at the first New Horn TV Drama Directors Awards. She also appeared in Youku's emotional inspirational drama Psychologist.

In 2022, Zhang participated in iQIYI's outdoor camping reality show Camping Life. In Defying the Storm, she portrayed "Meng Haitang", a character born into a scholarly family. The series explores the story of pilots and cultural scholars who intersect with each other on the road to saving the country. In August, she participated in season 6 of the celebrity reality show Chinese Restaurant.

In 2023, she starred in the youth love All These Years, and in the romantic comedy Too Beautiful to Lie films, earning nominations for both at the New Era International Film Festival. Too Beautiful to Lie tells the romantic comedy story of Bai Na, a female swindler from the Jianghu, and Fang Yaodong, a simple-minded man from a small town, as they encounter love.

That same year, she played a central role in Love Life Light, which went to gross ¥275 million at the box office. The screen work can be categorised as a "post-pandemic healing film", which tells the story of how people face the reality of losing loved ones, how they struggle to move beyond trauma, settle their minds and bodies, and rebuild their lives. She also starred in the fire-fighting series A Date with the Future, alongside William Chan. The drama follows a firefighter who makes a 10-year promise to Xu Lai (played by Zhang) to reassure her, and their reunion a decade later as she returns as a journalist and search dog trainer while he serves as a fire station captain, and they work together to keep that promise. Zhang was awarded the Promising Drama Performer at the Tencent Video All Star Awards for this role. The series received the "Chinese Cultural Communication Award" at the 2024 China–US Television Festival, as well as the "Outstanding TV Series of the Year" honour at the TV Landmark 2023 awards.

Zhang was paired with Luo Yunxi in Love is Panacea, portraying Su Weian, a determined and compassionate medical student. The series delves into the story of a neurosurgeon who meets a medical student with a rare illness during an aid mission in Africa; as they confront Huntington's disease together, they fall in love and help heal each other.

In 2024, Zhang appeared as the lead in the romantic comedy My Boss with Chen Xingxu. She played the rookie lawyer Cheng Yao in the series, which explores a determined young woman who becomes a lawyer and unexpectedly ends up living with her demanding boss, where their professional rivalry gradually turns into a complicated romance. She acted in Born To be the One, for which she earned the Breakthrough Performance Actress of the Year award at the Dragon TV Drama Quality Festival. The series unfolds the story of three young couples living in Beijing who, when faced with numerous crises in their careers and lives, chose not to give up but instead confronted their inner selves and ultimately overcame these crises together.

In 2025, Zhang starred in the series The First Frost alongside Bai Jingting, an adaptation of the romantic novel by Zhu Yi. It set a record for the fastest 10,000 popularity index on Youku, within two days of its release; trended in the "Top 3 Television Shows" on Netflix, and earned her "Top C-Drama Artists in the Global Market". The series surpassed 1.2 billion views one month after its premiere and 1.5 billion views after six months across streaming platforms worldwide. In this drama, she played Wen Yifan, a quiet and emotionally guarded woman who reconnects with her past and gradually heals through her love relationship.

She also featured in the film Mumu, in which she delicately portrays the character's inner grievances and loneliness, and enters the world of the deaf community with a sincere attitude, showcasing a moving emotional performance. The film follows a deaf father and his young daughter as they struggle to navigate life together while confronting communication barriers, social challenges, and the need for mutual understanding.

In 2026, Zhang played a leading role in Live Up to Your Youth alongside Bai Yu, Lin Yun and Wang Yanlin, which premiered on iQIYI. The series is a key literary and artistic project under the "Beijing Grand Audiovisual" initiative of the Beijing Municipal Radio and Television Bureau. Set in Beijing from the 1990s to 2018, it focuses on the artistic dream-pursuing journey of young people who moved to Beijing, showcasing their real-life struggles and growth in fields like scriptwriting and musical performance. Zhang played Zhuang Zhuang, a struggling dreamer and singer navigating ambition, hardship, and self-discovery while chasing her future in Beijing. The drama not only became the fastest series to surpass a 3% rating on CCTV-8 in 2026, but also ranked among the top prime-time shows on the channel. The show was awarded the Anticipated Television Series of the Year at the CMG China TV Drama Annual Awards, the Golden Angel Award for the TV Series of the Year at the 22nd China - the U.S. TV Festival, the Drama of the Year at the Heguang Audio-Visual Glory Night Awards, the Outstanding TV series of the Year at the 9th Chuxin Youth Audio-Visual Festival, and nominated for the Ammonite Award at the 6th New Era International Television Festival.

The same year, she portrayed a supporting character in the film My Friend An Delie, for which she received the Best Supporting Actress nomination at the Asian Art Film Festival. In May 2026, Zhan Zhao Adventures starring Yang Yang, Zhang Ruonan, and Fang Yilun premiered on CCTV-8 and online streaming platforms. In the drama, Zhang portrayed Huo Linglong, a fearless and intelligent young woman from Linglong Manor who escapes an arranged marriage; she joins Zhan Zhao's dangerous quest, helping uncover conspiracies while displaying loyalty, courage, and martial-arts skill throughout the journey. The series earned a nomination for the Ammonite Award at the 6th New Era International Television Festival.

A Part of Me adapted from the British film Miss You Already was released in July 2026, in which Zhang Ruonan stars as Gao Fan, a determined woman whose lifelong friendship with Wang Meili carries them through two decades of shared dreams, challenges, and life's most important milestones. The film was awarded the Most Anticipated Film of the Year at the Weibo Movie Night Awards 2026.

== Endorsements ==
In 2019, Maybelline New York appointed Zhang as its ambassador. In the same year, Zhang was introduced as the smile healing ambassador for Amore Pacific's IOPE and Shu Uemura's Brand Colour Friend. She became a brand ambassador for Guming Tea this year.

In 2021, Lola Rose Watch London confirmed Zhang as its new brand ambassador. She was the spokesperson for the Chery eQ1 Ant car. Zhang also appeared in campaigns of Sephora, Lancome, and SkinCeuticals as a brand friend in 2021.

In 2022, Zhang was chosen as the hair care ambassador for Pantene and the Brand Attitude Ambassador for Dove. She collaborated with Dior as a brand friend for the campaigns in 2022. Zhang had been the ambassador for Proya Skincare from 2022 to February 2026.

In 2023, Zhang was confirmed as the spokesperson for the high-end fragrance DearIrean and a shoes brand.

In April 2025, Zhang was selected as the image ambassador for OPPO Find X8 and a brand spokesperson for Junlebao Jianchun Yogurt.

In August 2025, Zhang was appointed as China's ambassador for Givenchy, the French luxury fashion brand. Zhang has attended Givenchy fashion shows in Paris since March 2025. In September, Zhang was named a brand ambassador for Gaode Maps (Amap) of AutoNavi, the high-end personal care ABC brand, and Basement FG. In October, Zhang became the ambassador for Realme Mobile Image and launched the Realme GT8 Pro. In November, she participated in the Double 11 Crazy Good Six Nights show for the Tmall platform. Zhang also expanded her local ambassadorship portfolio by partnering with additional brands.

In January 2026, Zhang was named Guerlain fragrance ambassador in China. Later that month, she was appointed as an ambassador for MLB Korea. In the same month, she presented as the New Year Festival ambassador for JD e-commerce.

In March 2026, Helena Rubinstein, a luxury avant-garde skincare brand, announced Zhang as its brand ambassador. Jeanswest unveiled Zhang as the global brand ambassador also in March. In April, she was chosen as the brand ambassador for Davena watch. Zhang became the ambassador for Tmall 618 in May and Zhuan Zhuan e-commerce platform in July 2026. In August 2026, Zhang expanded her brand endorsement portfolio with a new ambassador appointment. One month after, Zhang became the ambassador for NARS Cosmetics and the Imaging Project Partner for the HONOR Magic9 series smartphones.

Zhang participated in promotional campaigns of other international brands, such as Loro Piana, Chanel, Celine, Isabel Marant, Gentle Monster, AHKAH Jewellery, Longines, Longchamp, and Michael Kors.

== Influence ==
=== Social activities ===
In May 2019, Zhang joined China Movie Report's "Youth Season Entering Campus", visiting China Agricultural University to promote environmental awareness. In June 2019, she supported the "Yi Hu Bai Xing" campaign, raising awareness of respiratory health and pneumoconiosis.

In May 2020, she joined China Youth Network virtually to promote the use of AI technologies to combat the pandemic, such as managing hospital shifts, security monitoring, and infection tracking.

In 2021, she involved in health advocacy during the COVID-19 pandemic by joining a nationwide charity screening of the documentary Wuhan Days and Nights to raise public awareness of frontline efforts and honour healthcare workers. In the same year, Zhang participated in Lancome's charity project 'Write Her Future" to support female university students' employment and career development.

In 2022, Zhang joined the campaign of the National Fire and Rescue Administration calling for supervision and attention to children's fire safety.

In 2023, Zhang supported relief efforts for the 2023 Jishishan earthquake through the One Foundation. That same year, she participated in “Bird Love Week” activities, visiting Star Wish Park and encouraging people to enjoy nature, raise environmental awareness, protect wildlife, and support ecological conservation.

In 2024, as a public welfare ambassador, she participated in Sina Zhejiang’s "Let Love Come Home" campaign, encouraging people to express their love and reunite with their families. In August, she spoke at a children's nature writing camp organised by the China Society of Entrepreneurs and Ecology Organisation and CM Charity Communication, encouraging children to use poetry to protect nature and safeguard the habitats of rare species. Later that year, she participated in China Charity Day events, advocating "Everyone's Charity Day" to promote a sustainable clean water future.

In January 2025, Zhang donated to Tibet earthquake relief. In September, she endorsed the "Nature Protection and Free Growth" charity event in Hunan province, organised by the Changsha Women's and Children's Development Foundation in partnership with the ABC brand. In November, Zhang donated ¥500,000 to Hongkong Wang Fuk Court fire victims through the Shanghai Fosun Public Welfare Foundation.

In July 2026, Zhang donated to support the victims of the Guangxi floods and assist the rescue workers involved in the relief efforts. In August, she joined a charity to provide aid and disaster relief to Gyirong County, Shigatse City, Tibet, following the 2026 Nepal–Tibet floods.

=== Media image ===
In 2024, Zhang ranked 16th on the Top 500 Chinese Youth Brands. In 2025, she rose to 15th on the list, as announced at the 19th China Brand Festival at the Shenzhen Convention and Exhibition Center. 2026 marked Zhang’s third consecutive year appearing on this list.

Zhang has been featured on magazines, such as Vogue, Harper's Bazaar, Marie Claire, Elle, Grazia, L'Officiel, InStyle, Esquire, Cosmopolitan, So Figaro, Nylon, OK!, Jalouse, Glass Magazine, Ellemen New Youth, and Push Push Magazine.

She also appears on the covers and is presented in local magazines, including Ray Li Magazine, NeufMode, iDest Magazine, LifeStyle, Mars Magazine, Bobosnap, V Magazine, and Shang Cheng Shi.

== Filmography ==
=== Film ===
Year	English title	Chinese title	Role	Notes	Ref.
2018	Cry Me a Sad River	悲伤逆流成河	Gu Senxiang	Main role	
2020	The End of Endless Love	如果声音不记得	Ji Ze	Leading role	
2021	My Love	你的婚礼	You Yongci	Leading role	
2021	The Pioneer	革命者	Li Xinghua	Cameo	
2023	All These Years	这么多年	Ling Xiangqian	Cameo	
2023	Young China: Me and My Youth	我和我的青春	Xu Xin	Cameo	
2023	Too Beautiful To Lie	请别相信她	Bai Na	Leading role	
2023	Love Life Light	照明商店	Xu Nian	Leading role	
2025	Mumu	不说话的爱	Adult MuMu	Guest appearance	
2026	My Friend An Delie	我的朋友安德烈	Li Mo's wife	Supporting role	
2026	A Part of Me also called 'Miss You'	想你了	Gao Fan	Leading role	

=== Television series ===
Year	English title	Chinese title	Role	Notes	Ref.
2020	Everyone Wants to Meet You	谁都渴望遇见你	Luo Xi	Leading role	
2020	Love is All	师爷请自重	Tang Lingyin	Leading role	
2021	The Glory of Youth	号手就位	Liang Nuo	Supporting role	
2021	Be Yourself	机智的上半场	Huangfu Shumin	Leading role	
2021	Psychologist	女心理师	You Na	Guest appearance	
2022	Defying the Storm	凭栏一片风云起	Meng Haitang	Leading role	
2023	A Date with the Future	照亮你	Xu Lai	Leading role	
2023	Love is Panacea	治愈系恋人	Su Weian	Leading role	
2024	My Boss	你也有今天	Cheng Yao	Leading role	
2024	Born to be the One	凡人歌	Li Xiaoyue	Leading role	
2025	The First Frost	难哄	Wen Yifan	Leading role	
2025	Love in Pavilion	淮水竹亭	Yang Yan	Cameo	
2026	Live Up to Your Youth	冬去春來	Zhuang Zhuang	Leading role	
2026	Zhan Zhao Adventures	雨霖铃	Huo Linglong	Main role	
TBA	I Want to Hide You and Time Away	想把你和时间藏起来	Shen Qianzhan	Leading role	
TBA	Spring Banquet	春日宴	Li Huaiyu	Leading role	

=== Variety shows ===
Year	English Title	Chinese Title	Roles	Ref.
2020	The New Forbidden City; Season: 3 Ep. 9	上新了故宫	Participant	
2021	Youth with You; Season: 3 Ep. 22	青春有你	Participant	
2022	Sending 100 Girls Home; Season: 5 Ep. 9-10	送一百位女孩回家	Participant	
2022	Camping Life; Season: 1 Ep. 1-4; 9-10	一起露营吧	Cast member	
2022	Chinese Restaurant; Season: 6	中餐厅	Cast member	
2022	Wilderness Talks	荒野会谈	Participant	
2022	Hello Saturday (previously Happy Camp); Season: 1 Ep. 26	你好星期六	Participant	
2022	Keep Running; Special Season - Common Prosperity Ep. 6	奔跑吧	Participant	
2023	Mao Xuewang; Ep. 67	毛雪汪	Guest	
2023	Keep Running; Season: 11 Ep. 6	奔跑吧	Participant	
2024	Keep Running; Season: 12 Ep. 5	奔跑吧	Participant	
2025	Hello Saturday; Season: 4 Ep. 9	你好星期六	Participant	
2025	Hello Saturday; Season: 4 Ep. 23	你好星期六	Participant	
2025	Mao Xuewang; Ep. 110	毛雪汪	Guest	
2025	Infinite Transcendence Class; Season: 3	无限超越班	Participant	
2025	Twist Happy; Season: 2 Ep. 2	麻花特开心	Participant	
2025	Keep Running; Season: 13 Ep. 9	奔跑吧	Participant	
2025	Our Dormitory; Ep. 5	我们的宿舍	Participant	
2026	Keep Running; Season: 14 Ep. 11-12	奔跑吧	Participant	
2026	Hello Saturday; Live session July 2026; Ep 121 (2026 edition)	你好星期六	Participant	
2026	The Truth; Season: 4 Special Ep. 5, 8-10	开始推理吧	Participant	

=== Other shows ===
Year	Title	Roles	Ref.
2019–2020	I am the Actor: The Ultimate Showdown; Ep. 4, 6, 10-12	Cast member	
2020	Hunan Television's short film 'College Entrance Examination 2020'	Actress	
2020	Hunan Satellite TV's Pinduoduo 12.12 Super Night	Participant	
2024	2024 CCTV Spring Festival Gala	Participant	
2025	2025 Tmall Double 11 Crazy Good Six Nights	Participant	
2025	Hunan Satellite TV New Year's Eve concert	Participant	
2026	2026 CCTV Spring Festival Gala; Yiwu Branch Venue	Participant	

== Discography ==
=== Soundtrack appearances ===
Year	Title	Album	Artist	Ref.
2019	"Friend Zone"	Friend Zone	Peng Yuchang & Zhang Ruonan	
2021	"My Shape"	Be Yourself	Zhang Xinyi, Shen Yue, Zhang Ruonan & Wei Wei	
2021	"Farewell"	The Glory of Youth	Zhang Ruonan	
2025	"Everything"	The First Frost	Zhang Ruonan & Zhang Miaoyi	

=== Music video appearances ===
Year	Title	Artist	Channel	Note	Ref.
2018	"Like A River"	Angela Zhang	Angela Zhang	Cry Me a Sad River OST	
2020	"Deception"	Zhang Bichen	Love BC-專屬張碧晨	The End of Endless Love OST	
2021	"After Leaving You"	Eric Chou	Eric Chou	My Love OST	
2021	"As You Said"	Zhang Yuzi	Ewang	My Love OST	
2021	"The 10,001st Confession"	Li Zongyuan	Ewang	My Love OST	
2021	"Youth! Dare"	Air League Band	Air League Band	My Love OST	
2025	"Willful"	Mayday	B'in Music	The First Frost OST	
2025	"I’m So Into You"	Xiao Bingchih	B'in Music	The First Frost OST	
2025	"Like Sunny Days, Like Rainy Days"	Silence Wang	Dreamer Music	The First Frost OST	
2026	"Winter Goes Spring Comes" - Dong qu chun lai	孙旸 Yang Sun	Live Up to Your Youth Production Team & Dreamer Music	Live Up to Your Youth OST	
2026	"The Girl I Love"	Jin Jing and Zhang Ruonan	A Part of Me Production Team	A Part of Me OST	
2026	"Endless Love"	William Chan	EEG Music and William Chan		

=== Singles ===
Year	Title	Album	Artist	Ref.
2018	"Yesterday's Blue Sky"	Promotional song for Cry Me a Sad River movie	Zhao Yingbo, Ren Min, Xin Yunlai, Zhang Ruonan & Zhu Danni	

== Awards and nominations ==
Year	Award	Category	Work	Result	Ref.
2019	iFeng Fashion Choice Awards	Fashion Youth Trend Award	—N/a	Won	
2020	28th Life Style Gala	Most Promising Artist	—N/a	Won	
2021	Weibo Movie Night	Promising Performer of the Year	—N/a	Won	
2023	1st New Horn TV Drama Directors' Night	Breakthrough Actress of the Year	Be Yourself	Won	
2023	Tencent Video All Star Night	Promising Drama Performer	A Date with the Future	Won	
2023	4th New Era International Film Festival Golden Bloom Award	Most Challenging Actress of the New Era	Too Beautiful To Lie	Nominated	
2023	4th New Era International Film Festival Golden Bloom Award	Most Charming Actress of the New Era	All These Years	Nominated	
2024	Weibo Vision Conference Awards	Annual Recommendation: TV Drama Star	Born to Be the One	Nominated	
2025	Dragon TV Drama Quality Festival	Breakthrough Performance Actress of the Year	Born to Be the One	Won	
2025	Bazaar Gala	Most Charming Actress	—N/a	Won	
2025	30th Asian Television Awards	Best Actress in a Leading Role	The First Frost	Nominated	
2025	Weibo TV & Internet Video Summit	Best Drama Actress	The First Frost	Nominated	
2025	Weibo TV & Internet Video Summit	Best Drama Character: Wen Yifan played by Zhang Ruonan	The First Frost	Nominated	
2025	Weibo TV & Internet Video Summit	Best Drama Couple: Sang Yan & Wen Yifan played by Bai Jingting & Zhang Ruonan	The First Frost	Nominated	
2025	iQIYI Scream Night	Overseas Unit Asia-Pacific Outstanding Actress of the Year	Work across multiple TV series	Won	
2026	Huanwang Big Data Awards	Most Popular Actress of the Year	The First Frost	Nominated	
2026	Weibo Awards	Breakthrough Actress of the Year	Work across multiple TV series	Won	
2026	Asian Art Film Festival - The Golden Petrel Awards	Best Supporting Actress	My Friend An Delie	Nominated	
2026	6th New Era International Television Festival	Most Popular Actress	Live Up to Your Youth	Nominated	
2026	Seoul International Drama Awards	Outstanding Asian Star: China	Live Up to Your Youth	Nominated	
2026	Bazaar Gala	Breakthrough Actress	—N/a	Won	
2026	Weibo TV & Internet Video Summit	Best Television Couple: Xu Shengli & Zhuang Zhuang played by Bai Yu (actor) & Zhang Ruonan	Live Up to Your Youth	Nominated	
2026	Weibo TV & Internet Video Summit	Best Television Character: Zhuang Zhuang played by Zhang Ruonan	Live Up to Your Youth	Nominated	
2026	Weibo TV & Internet Video Summit	Best Television Character: Huo Linglong played by Zhang Ruonan	Zhan Zhao Adventures	Nominated	
2026	Yangtze River Delta International Youth Film Festival - Zhijiang Honour Awards	Special Notable Film Actress	A Part of Me	Won	
