= My Love (2021 film) =

2021 Chinese romantic comedy film

- Theatrical release poster
- Chinese: 你的婚礼
- Hanyu Pinyin: nǐ de hūnlǐ
- Directed by: Han Tian
- Screenplay by: Zhang Ying; Jiao Tingting; Han Tian
- Based on: On Your Wedding Day by Lee Seok-Geun
- Starring: Greg Hsu; Zhang Ruonan; Ding Guansen; Yan Zidong; Guo Cheng; Wang Shasha
- Production companies: Youth Enlight; Dream Chaser Pictures
- Release dates: April 27, 2021 (SAGA Luxury Cinemas); April 30, 2021 (China)
- Running time: 115 minutes
- Country: China
- Language: Mandarin
- Box office: $116.7 million

My Love is a 2021 Chinese romantic comedy film directed and co-written by Han Tian. It is a remake of the 2018 South Korean film On Your Wedding Day. The film stars Greg Hsu and Zhang Ruonan, and features Ding Guansen, Yan Zidong, Guo Cheng and Wang Shasha in supporting roles. The plot follows a story of first love, spanning fifteen years, from teenagers to adults.

The film was released on April 30, 2021. It received mixed reviews from critics but was widely successful at the box office, making it the highest-grossing romantic comedy film of 2021 in China. The film has grossed over $116 million worldwide.

== Plot ==
Zhou Xiaoqi, a talented swimmer, falls in love at first sight with a transfer student, You Yongci, after getting involved in a school fight. Xiaoqi silently protects Yongci, but her sudden departure without a word leaves him heartbroken.

In the years that follow, Xiaoqi fails to get into college. While working as an internet café attendant, he unexpectedly comes across clues about Yongci's whereabouts. Motivated by his longing to see her again, he retakes his exams and enrolls in her university, hoping to rekindle their connection.

However, their reunion is not as sweet as he had imagined. The right time for love always seems to elude Xiaoqi. Despite the help of his loyal friend Zhang Fang and others, Yongci is already accompanied by a senior. After graduation, the two drift apart and go their separate ways. Yet, fate brings them back together once more, leading to a 15-year-long journey of love.

== Cast ==
- Greg Hsu as Zhou Xiaoqi
- Zhang Ruonan as You Yongci
- Ding Guansen as Zhang Fang
- Yan Zidong as Chang Fan
- Guo Cheng as Chen Chen
- Wang Shasha as Wang Yuke
- Connor Leong as Chen Haoer
- Liu Xun as Sha Yu

== Production ==
Principal photography began at the end of May 2020, at locations such as Fuzhou, Quanzhou, Xiamen, Zhangzhou in China and wrapped on July 28, 2020.

== Release ==
My Love premiered at the Saga Luxury Cinemas in Hangzhou on April 27, 2021, and was theatrically released in China on April 30, 2021. The film was released in Singapore on May 6 and in Brunei on May 13. Opening in theaters in North America, Australia and New Zealand starts from May 7. The film was released in Taiwan through streaming on July 9, and was released in South Korea theatrically on August 25. It had planned release date in Malaysia on May 6, and was delayed to September 16 in response to the COVID-19 pandemic.

== Reception ==
=== Box office ===
My Love grossed CN¥424 million (US$65.6 million) in its three-day opening weekend in China.

=== Critical response ===
On the Chinese review aggregator Maoyan, more than 650,000 audiences rated this film and the average rating is 8.0/10.

Lim Yian Lu from Singapore, reviewing the film for Yahoo Life, wrote: "Being a romance drama, the plot takes its audience through all the highs and lows of the couple's love story. Although 115 minutes can be a little long, the details are well executed, lending depth to not only the characters, but also their relationship."

=== Accolades ===
| Year | Award | Category | Recipient | Result |
|---|---|---|---|---|
| 2020 | Douyin Entertainment Annual Awards | The Most Anticipated Romance Movie | My Love | Won |
| 2021 | Huading Awards | Best New Actor | Greg Hsu | Nominated |
