= The First Frost =

2025 Chinese romantic series

- Promotional poster
- Also known as: Hard To Please; Difficult To Coax
- Simplified Chinese: 难哄
- Genre: Romance; Youth; Slice of life
- Based on: The First Frost by Zhu Yi
- Screenplay by: Qu Youning
- Directed by: Qu Youning; Jiang Ruizhi; Jia Hao
- Starring: Bai Jingting; Zhang Ruonan; Zhang Miaoyi; Edward Chen
- Opening theme: "Willful" by Mayday
- Ending theme: "It's You" by Li Yuchun
- Country of origin: China
- Original language: Mandarin
- No. of episodes: 32

Production
- Producer: Long Danni
- Production location: Hong Kong, Chongqing, China
- Running time: 45 minutes
- Production company: Youku

Original release
- Network: Youku; Netflix
- Release: 18 February – 10 March 2025

Related
- Hidden Love; Eternal Love (Manhua); First Frost (Anime)

The First Frost (Chinese: 难哄) is a 2025 Chinese romantic television series starring Bai Jingting and Zhang Ruonan. The plot is adapted from the Chinese web novel of the same name by Zhu Yi. On 18 February 2025, it was released on Youku and Netflix worldwide. It is about two former high school classmates who reunite after years and accidentally share the same apartment. It delves into the complexities of love, longing, trauma and healing. On 15 November 2025, the Chinese animation First Frost was announced on Bilibili.

On 23 August 2025, the series' two episodes were screened for 91 minutes at the 30th Busan International Film Festival. It sets a record by exceeding 10,000 'Popularity Heat Index' points within 2 days of its release on Youku. On 27 February 2025, it was ranked 6th in 'Netflix Top TV Shows Worldwide', and has set the record for the highest ranked C-drama in 'Netflix Global' daily ranking history. It was ranked in the S+ Tier i.e. 'Top Performing Shows' on Yunhe Chart.

== Plot ==
Wen Yifan accidentally runs into Sang Yan at a bar after six years. The two were high school classmates and had a crush on each other. However, she was driven to reject his feelings, causing them to drift apart. To avoid the awkwardness, they pretend not to know each other. Due to circumstances, they are compelled to confront each other when they end up sharing the same roof. The nature of their relationship changes when Wen Yifan learns that she's sleepwalking again. Her condition escalates due to past family trauma and she finds herself in Sang Yan's room, which further intertwines their lives.

== Cast ==
Character	Cast	Notes
Sang Yan	Bai Jingting	Co-owner of Overtime restaurant & bar, team lead in a video game company and Yifan's high school crush
Wen Yifan	Zhang Ruonan	News reporter/journalist, a former ballerina and Sang Yan's high school love
Zhong Siqiao	Zhang Miaoyi	Delivery girl, care services provider and Yifan's best friend
Su Haoan	Edward Chen	Co-owner of Overtime and Sang Yan's friend from high school days
Xiang Lang	Zhai Xiaowen	Yifan and Siqiao's childhood friend, has a crush on Yifan
Mu Chengyun	Yuan Ye	College student, intern in Yifan's team and has a crush on her
Zhao Yuandong	Feng Yunzhi	Yifan's mother
Wen Liangzhe	Zhao Xiaodong	Yifan's father
Zheng Kejia	Duan Xingyu	Yifan's stepsister, intern in Sang Yan's team
Che Yanqin	Kong Lin	Yifan's aunt
Che Xingde	Li Hongchen	Yanqin's brother
Wen Ming	Ji Peng	Yanqin's son, Yifan's cousin
Zhang Wenhong	He Jiong	Highschool teacher for Sang Yan and Yifan
Li Ping	Deng Ying	Sang Yan's mother
Sang Rong	Wei Zixin	Sang Yan's father
Sang Zhi	Liu Chutian	Sang Yan's younger sister
Duan Jiaxu	Wu Yuheng	Sang Yan's college dormmate and friend
Jiang Ru	Paw Heeching	Su Haoan's grandmother
Su Haojia	Paul Chun	Su Haoan's grandfather. He was later diagnosed with Alzheimer's disease
Uncle Ma	Zhang Shihong	Su Haoan's uncle and grandpa's caretaker
Su Tian	Chen Jianan	Pregnant lady and news editor, Yifan's colleague
Fu Zhuang	Zhang Keyuan	Reporting camera assistant, Yifan's colleague
Qian Wenhua	Fu Miao	News Department team lead
Jiang Zhong Wei	Gan Hong Yuan	News Department manager
Yu Zhou	Zhang Ruixi	Overtime staff
Chen Junwen	Zhe Tang	Overtime co-owner and Sangyan's college friend
Qian Fei	Su Yiyang	Overtime co-owner and Sangyan's college friend
Wen Yifan (young)	Li Mei Yibing	8-year-old Yifan with her dad
Sang Zhi (young)	Ai Rui	Sang Yan's younger sister
Wang Jun Yuan	Lily Wang	Police office
Lin Yuqing	Zhang Muxi	Ballet teacher in Hong Kong
A Sen	Jeffrey Ngai	Ballet teacher in Hong Kong
Wang Linlin	Suo Langmei Qi	Su Haoan's ex-girlfriend

== Soundtrack ==
On 31 December 2024, Taiwanese rock band Mayday released an official OST and music video for the series. "The Invisible Man" sung by Bai Jingting, originally sung by Stefanie Sun from her 2005 album A Perfect Day, was listed among 'Top 10 Songs' on streaming platforms. At the series finale, Bai Jingting and Zhang Ruonan performed a piano rendition of the song "Willful".

Title	Artist	Lyrics/Composer	Channel	Length
Willful; Theme Song	Mayday	Ashin	B'in Music	4:40
I'm So Into You	Xiao Bingchih		B'in Music	4:24
Like A Sunny Day, Like A Rainy Day	Silence Wang		Dreamer Music	3:56
The Invisible Man	Bai Jingting	Xiaohan, Eric Ng	Dreamer Music	4:45
Serenade	Mao Buyi		Dreamer Music	4:06
It's You; Ending Song	Li Yuchun	Li Ziming	Official Channel	5:21
Everything	Zhang Ruonan & Zhang Miaoyi	Jesse Deng	Official Channel	3:40
Late	Zhang Bichen	Zhang Pengpeng	Official Channel	4:25
Stubborn	Sandee Chan		Official Channel	3.23
I've Never Liked Anyone Except You	Zhao Lei & Fine Band	Wang Tianfang, Huang Yueyang, Shen Mingli	Official Channel	3:45
Look at Me	Yan Yidan		Official Channel	4:14
Crush	Edward Chen	Zhuang Zhuheng	Official Channel	4:15
My Dear	Zhang Yihao	Li Zhizi	Dreamer Music	4:03
There Is You Amidst Raindrops	Chen Kexin	Crispy Band (Taiwanese)	Official Channel	4:00

== Reception ==
Director Qu Youning joined the post-screening exchange at the 30th Busan International Film Festival, South Korea. Before its release, the series collected over 8M reservations on Youku. It surpassed billions of views across Douyin and Xiaohongshu; set the record for contemporary dramas, and was named the 'Hottest Youth Idol C-Drama'. Its popularity led to its first merchandise pop-up store in Taiwan.

During its release, Bai Jingting and Zhang Ruonan were ranked 'Top C-Drama Artists in the International Market'. Bai's role as Sang Yan was ranked 1st on the 'Character Index List'.

=== Critics reviews ===
Gulf News praises stating that "The First Frost is a more mature, emotionally intense journey. Bai Jingting bringing a quiet intensity that makes Sang Yan's pain all the more palpable. Zhang Ruonan delivers a powerful performance as Wen Yifan, whose guarded nature hides layers of emotional turmoil. The dual perspective storytelling, adds a compelling layer to the narrative, showing how emotions shape their interactions." Indiatimes states that "The non-linear storytelling, seamlessly transitioning from their high-school desk to their now shared apartment, never confuses you. The visual aesthetic perfectly complements the theme of the drama. The thoughtful, slow pacing highlights subtle expressions, portraying their untangled yet impactful history."

Evrim Ağacı website stated that "The show dives deeply with emotion, centering on themes of heartbreak, longing, and healing. The initial episodes have delighted viewers, showcasing the commendable chemistry between leads, and expertly retaining the charm of the characters." India Today stated that "The First Frost delivers it all, with stellar performances, breathtaking cinematography, and a script that captures weight of regret. A drama that lingers long after the credits." English Jagran stated that "The First Frost leaves lasting impact worldwide, with its thought provoking storytelling, poetic visuals, narratives and masterful character development."

GQ stated that the "This slow burn romance is packed with unspoken love, youthful chemistry and strong emotions, unfolding in a joyous manner as destiny brings protagonist under the same roof." India Forum states that "The First Frost is a gripping and evocative statement on how mental abuse in teenage affects people. From being too self-reliant to dealing with constant low self-esteem, it touches a raw nerve." Mashable rated 4/5 stating that "The First Frost hits all the emotional and heart-fluttering beats, a bingeable C-drama. It's a refreshing and deeply nice take on romance, new insights that raise awareness on sensitive issues."

Daily Tribune (Philippines) praised The First Frost stating that "It is a soul stirring and angsty masterpiece. It's a drama that stays with you long after the credits have rolled - a warm, lingering hug on the coldest of nights." Newspoint appreciated stating that "The series deals with the aftermath of discovering love in a painful and gut-wrenching way. Its cinematography doesn't just display sentiments, it makes you feel them." Dramadaze highlights that "The First Frost is the perfect balance between heartfelt romance and visual storytelling. It's a love story that feels both grand and personal, pulling you in with its sincerity."

== Production ==
The First Frost is produced by Wajijiwa, Youku Information Technology (Beijing) Co. Ltd., and Hunan Galaxy Cool Entertainment Culture Media Co. Ltd. The production house issued an official statement on their Weibo account that a live adaptation of Zhu Yi's novel The First Frost will be made. In August 2023, the production house stated the series was undergoing script polishing and content development. It also has a Manhua adaption named Eternal Love. On 24 March 2024, the initial posters were released. From February to June 2024, the filming took place in Chongqing. On 27 June 2024, the series' first official teaser was released. In December 2024, the series got its airing permit for 32 episodes on Youku.

== Ratings ==
The series topped Yunhe with 50M daily views, Dengta with 70M views, 19.7% market share, and led other platforms.

- The Orange number represents the lowest ratings and the Blue number represents the highest ratings in China.
- Based on the average audience share per day (Yunhe Data).

Day	Original Broadcast Date	Episode	Average Audience Share	National Ranking China
1	February 18, 2025	1-4	7.7%	2
2	February 19, 2025	5-6	13.2%	1
3	February 20, 2025	7-8	15.6%	1
4	February 21, 2025	9-10	18.5%	1
5	February 22, 2025	11	20.5%	1
6	February 23, 2025	12	19.4%	1
7	February 24, 2025	13-14	18.3%	1
8	February 25, 2025	15	17.7%	1
9	February 26, 2025	16	16.1%	1
10	February 28, 2025	17-18	18.1%	1
11	March 1, 2025	19	19.1%	1
12	March 2, 2025	20	18.4%	1
13	March 3, 2025	21	16.6%	1
14	March 4, 2025	22	16.1%	1
15	March 5, 2025	23	15.3%	1
16	March 7, 2025	24	13.4%	1
17	March 8, 2025	25-26	16.1%	1
18	March 9, 2025	27-28	18.1%	1
19	March 10, 2025	29-32	16.8%	1
Average			16.6%	

== Awards and nominations ==
Year	Award	Category	Nominee	Result	Ref.
2025	30th Busan International Film Festival (Asian Content & Global OTT Awards)	Best Leading Actor	Bai Jingting	Nominated	
2025	30th Busan International Film Festival (Asian Content & Global OTT Awards)	People's Choice Awards: Best Actor	Bai Jingting	Won	
2025	30th Busan International Film Festival (Asian Content & Global OTT Awards)	Best OTT Original	The First Frost	Nominated	
2025	30th Busan International Film Festival (Asian Content & Global OTT Awards)	Best Original Song	Willful: Mayday	Nominated	
2025	Weibo Cultural Exchange; Thailand	Most Popular TV Series	The First Frost	Won	
2025	Weibo TV & Internet Video Summit	Popular Work of the Year	The First Frost	Won	
2025	Weibo TV & Internet Video Summit	Best Original Work	The First Frost	Won	
2025	Weibo TV & Internet Video Summit	Best Drama	The First Frost	Nominated	
2025	Weibo TV & Internet Video Summit	Best Drama Actor	Bai Jingting	Nominated	
2025	Weibo TV & Internet Video Summit	Best Drama Actress	Zhang Ruonan	Nominated	
2025	Weibo TV & Internet Video Summit	Best Drama Character	Sang Yan	Nominated	
2025	Weibo TV & Internet Video Summit	Best Drama Character	Wen Yifan	Nominated	
2025	Weibo TV & Internet Video Summit	Best Drama Couple	Sang Yan & Wen Yifan; Bai Jingting & Zhang Ruonan	Nominated	
2025	Weibo TV & Internet Video Summit	Best OST	Willful: Mayday	Nominated	
2025	Weibo TV & Internet Video Summit	Best OST	Like A Sunny Day, Like A Rainy Day: Silence Wang	Nominated	
2025	30th Asian Television Awards	Best Actor in Leading Role	Bai Jingting	Nominated	
2025	30th Asian Television Awards	Best Actress	Zhang Ruonan	Nominated	
2025	30th Asian Television Awards	Best Supporting Actress	Zhang Miaoyi	Nominated	
2025	30th Asian Television Awards	Best Scriptwriting	Qu Youning	Nominated	
2025	30th Asian Television Awards	Best Cinematography	Xinhua Feng	Nominated	
2025	30th Asian Television Awards	Best Editing	Yuwei Wang	Nominated	
2025	30th Asian Television Awards	Best Production Design	Honghu Liang	Nominated	
2025	30th Asian Television Awards	Best Theme Song	Willful: Mayday	Won	
2025	Chinese American Film Festival (Golden Angel Award)	Best TV Series	The First Frost	Nominated	
2025	Youku Annual Breakout Hits Awards	Best Seller	The First Frost	Won	
2025	Youku Annual Breakout Hits Awards	Best Modern Drama	The First Frost	Won	
2026	Tencent Music Chart Awards (Top 10 Songs)	Top Song of the Year	Like A Sunny Day, Like A Rainy Day: Silence Wang	Won	
2026	Tencent Music Chart Awards (Top 10 Songs)	Album of the Year	Like A Sunny Day, Like A Rainy Day: Silence Wang	Won	
2026	Tencent Music Chart Awards (Top 10 Songs)	Drama OST of the Year	Like A Sunny Day, Like A Rainy Day: Silence Wang	2nd	
2026	Tencent Music Chart Awards (Top 10 Songs)	Original Song of the Year	Like A Sunny Day, Like A Rainy Day: Silence Wang	4th	
2026	Tencent Music Chart Awards (Top 10 Songs)	Music Video of the Year	Like A Sunny Day, Like A Rainy Day: Silence Wang	6th	
2026	Tencent Music Chart Awards (Top 10 Songs)	Longest Charting Song	Like A Sunny Day, Like A Rainy Day: Silence Wang	9th	
2026	Tencent Music Chart Awards (Top 10 Songs)	Drama OST of the Year	Willful: Mayday	8th	
2026	Tencent Music Chart Awards (Top 10 Songs)	Female Listeners’ Favorite	My Dear: Zhang Zhenhao	Won	
2026	Huanwang Big Data Awards	Best Actor	Bai Jingting	Nominated	
2026	Huanwang Big Data Awards	Popular Actor of the Year	Bai Jingting	Nominated	
2026	Huanwang Big Data Awards	Popular Actress of the Year	Zhang Ruonan	Nominated	
2026	Huanwang Big Data Awards	Commercially Valuable Drama of the Year	The First Frost	Nominated	
2026	Huanwang Big Data Awards	Popular Drama	The First Frost	Nominated	
2026	7th Cloud+ Awards	Long Series of the Year	The First Frost	Won	
2026	Weibo Night	Breakthrough Actress of the Year	Zhang Ruonan	Won	
2026	Weibo Night	Most Influential Actor of the Year	Bai Jingting	Won	
2026	SMG TV Drama Quality Awards	Annual Quality and Powerful Drama Star	Bai Jingting	Won	
2026	SMG TV Drama Quality Awards	Best Quality Actress	Zhang Ruonan	Won	
