= Kevin Yan =

Kevin Yan may refer to:

- Yan Yikuan (born 1979), Chinese actor and singer
- Yan Zidong (born 1994), Chinese actor and singer

== See also ==
- Kévin Yann (born 1989), French footballer
