= A Little Mood for Love =

2021 Chinese drama

- Promotional poster
- Also known as: Xiaomin's Home, Xiaomin's House
- Chinese: 小敏家
- Hanyu Pinyin: Xiǎo mǐn jiā
- Genre: Drama, Family, Remarriage
- Based on: Xiaomin's Home (小敏家) by Yi Bei
- Written by: Huang Lei; Guo Sihan; Zhang Xin
- Directed by: Wang Jun
- Starring: Zhou Xun; Huang Lei; Tang Yixin; Tu Songyan; Liu Lili
- Opening theme: Say Hello by Zhou Shen
- Ending theme: Dare to Love, Dare to Let go by Lei Jia
- Country of origin: China
- Original language: Mandarin
- No. of seasons: 1
- No. of episodes: 45

Production
- Executive producer: Xu Xiao'ou
- Production companies: Linmon Pictures; Magic Stone (Beijing) Co., Ltd. Youku

Original release
- Network: Hunan TV; Youku
- Release: December 11, 2021 – January 4, 2022

Related
- A Little Reunion; A Love for Dilemma

A Little Mood for Love (Chinese: 小敏家, lit. 'Xiaomin's Home') is a 2021 Chinese romance television series based on Yi Bei's novel, Xiaomin's Home. Directed by Wang Jun, it stars Zhou Xun, Huang Lei, Tang Yixin, Tu Songyan, and Liu Lili. It premiered on Hunan TV and Youku on December 11, 2021. It is also available for streaming on Disney+ in selected regions on February 1, 2023.

According to the National Radio and Television Administration, the series was the highest rated prime-time drama in Chinese satellite television channel in 2021.

== Plot ==
Wang Sumin single-handedly raised two daughters, Liu Xiaomin and Liu Xiaojie, unexpectedly both of her daughters after the age of 30 were divorced. The husband of the eldest daughter Liu Xiaomin had an affair, she came from a small town to Beijing to find a place to work and got to know Chen Zhuo, who was also divorced like her, they decided to remarry. But Xiaomin and Chen Zhuo both have an uncomfortable ex, their children are growing up and the adults in the family are all over 60 years old, how to get the approval of the other's family and integrate into the family? Each other's life has become an insurmountable obstacle for the two of them.

The youngest sister, Liu Xiaojie, got married, but divorced because her personality did not match her husband. She used to think not to remarry, but she met a talented young man, Xu Zheng and was seriously pursued by the other party. However, Xu Zheng, – who is younger than Xiaojie – is a virgin, and their love encounters fierce opposition from his parents. Under the guidance of their mother, Liu Xiaomin and Chen Zhuo tolerance to solve the dilemmas in love, finally found happiness in life and began to grow up.

== Cast ==
- Zhou Xun as Liu Xiaomin
- Huang Lei as Chen Zhuo
- Tang Yixin as Liu Xiaojie
- Tu Songyan as Jin Bo
- Liu Lili as Wang Sumin
- Qin Hailu as Li Ping
- Zhou Yiran as Jin Jiajun
- Xiang Hanzhi as Chen Jiajia
- Han Tongsheng as Chen Tianfu
- Fan Shiqi as Xu Zheng
- Feng Lei as Hong Wei
- Wu Bi as Qian Feng
- Qi Yi as Lisa
- Jeremy Qu as Tong Bing (Xiaojie's ex-husband)
- Liu Fang as Tong Bing's mother
- Bao Da Zhi as Xu Zheng's father

== Production ==
Filming began on March 8, 2021 and concluded on July 8, 2021.

== Ratings ==
Highest ratings are marked in red, lowest ratings are marked in blue

Broadcast date	Episode #	Hunan TV CSM63 city network ratings			CSM National Network		
Broadcast date	Episode #	Ratings (%)	Audience share (%)	Rank	Ratings (%)	Audience share (%)	Rank
2021.12.11	1-2	2.455	8.53	2	1.85	4.18	2
2021.12.12	3-4	2.693	10	2	2.01	4.55	2
2021.12.13	5-6	2.4	9.42	2	2.19	2.35	3
2021.12.14	7-8	2.534	9.98	2	2.26	4.62	3
2021.12.15	9-10	2.26	9.12	1	2.45	5.02	3
2021.12.16	11-12	2.084	8.03	3	2.42	4.86	3
2021.12.17	13	2.018	6.482	5	1.66	3.23	4
2021.12.18	14-15	2.373	8.338	2	2.34	5.26	2
2021.12.19	16-17	2.410	9.019	2	2.38	5.41	2
2021.12.20	18-19	2.612	10.311	1	2.68	5.34	3
2021.12.21	20-21	2.325	8.932	2	2.58	5.15	2
2021.12.22	22-23	2.372	9.039	2	2.69	5.28	2
2021.12.23	24-25	2.423	9.299	1	2.71	5.42	2
2021.12.24	26	1.865	5.980	5	1.91	3.79	4
2021.12.25	27-28	2.297	7.801	3	2.66	5.9	1
2021.12.26	29-30	2.381	8.523	3	2.77	6.18	1
2021.12.27	31-32	2.512	9.665	2	2.79	5.62	2
2021.12.28	33-34	2.436	9.352	2	2.85	5.78	3
2021.12.29	35-36	2.374	9.117	3	2.72	5.52	3
2021.12.30	37-38	2.492	9.12	4	2.73	5.46	3
2022.01.01	39	1.815	5.88	5	1.96	4.4	3
2022.01.02	40-41	2.532	8.96	1	2.69	6.09	1
2022.01.03	42-43	2.77	10.49	1	2.91	5.72	1
2022.01.04	44-45	2.79	10.06	1	3.07	5.92	2
Average ratings							

== Soundtrack ==
Credits are adapted from QQ Music
No.	Title	Lyrics	Music	Singers	Length
1.	"Say Hello (说声你好)" (Opening theme song)	Liu Fengyao	Liu Fengyao	Zhou Shen	4:35
2.	"Dare to Love, Dare to Let Go (敢爱敢放)" (Ending theme song)	Lin Qiao, Zero-	Sun Aili	Lei Jia	3:53
3.	"During the Hiatus (暂停营业中)"	Deng Shuyue	Deng Shuyue	Lai Meiyun	4:09
4.	"Pure Warmth (原来的温暖)"	Zhang Yilin	Zhang Yilin	Mao Buyi	4:26
