= Blue Summer =

Blue Summer may refer to:

- Verano azul, a Spanish television drama series (1981–82)
- Perché uccidi ancora, a 1965 Italian western film released in English as Blue Summer
- Blue Summer, English title of Ao-Natsu, a 2018 Japanese film directed by Takeshi Furusawa
- Blue Summer, a 2020 album by Cayucas
- "Blue Summer", a song by Bad Manners from the 1985 album Mental Notes

== See also ==
- My Blue Summer, a 2022 Chinese youth romantic film
