= Reborn (TV series) =

2025 Chinese Drama

- Genre: Drama, Mystery, Romance
- Based on: Huan Yu by Qiang Yu
- Written by: Qian Jingjing, Xu Ziyuan
- Directed by: Liu Ziwei
- Starring: Zhang Jingyi, Zhou Yiran
- Country of origin: China
- Original language: Chinese
- No. of episodes: 23

Production
- Running time: 45 minutes

Original release
- Network: Tencent Video
- Release: 19 June – 6 July 2025

Reborn (Chinese: 焕羽) is a 2025 Chinese television drama based on the Web novel Huan Yu by Qiang Yu (蔷屿), directed by Liu Ziwei and starring Zhang Jingyi and Zhou Yiran. The series follows Qiao Qingyu investigates the truth behind her sister's death, finding mutual redemption and growing together with a young boy named Ming Sheng.

The series premiered on Tencent Video on June 19, 2025, concluding its 23-episode run on July 6, 2025.

== Synopsis ==
Troubled by rumors, young Qingyu decided to investigate the cause of her sister Beiyu's death. She was determined to avenge her sister but ended up getting her family into even worse trouble. Ultimately, the encouragement of Ming Sheng and other friends allowed Qingyu to reconcile with her mother, find out the hidden love of her family and achieve personal growth.

== Cast and characters ==
=== Main ===
- Zhang Jingyi as Qiao Qingyu

Qiao Qingyu is an innocent, kind-hearted, brave, and resilient young woman. Convinced that her sister's death was not a suicide, she teamed up with her classmate Ming Sheng to investigate the truth after her family moved in 2007, ultimately exposing the hidden injustices behind the incident.

- Zhou Yiran as Ming Sheng

Ming Sheng is Qiao Qingyu's classmate. Born into a well-off middle-class family, his complicated family circumstances caused him to mature early. He often comes across as aloof and rebellious, but he helps Qiao Qingyu uncover the truth behind her sister's death and quietly stands by her side.

=== Supporting ===
- Wu You as Qiao Beiyu

Qiao Qingyu's sister, she died in an accident as a result of her parents' long-tern neglect.

- Huang Xiyan as Qiao Jinrui

The eldest grandson of the Qiao family and Qiao Qingyu's cousin. Though he appeared to be a model citizen, he had actually sexually assaulted Qiao Beiyu, an act that ultimately led to a tragedy, yet the family covered it up.

== Reception ==
The series' notable narrative and stylistic innovations, its thematic content have been recognized by major media outlets including the People's Daily, Guangming Daily, Xinhua News Agency, China News Service, China Youth Daily, and China Women's News. Through a cross-industry collaboration with the China Foundation for the Prevention of STDs and AIDS to promote scientific awareness, the series has explored new ways for cultural works to contribute to social governance. The series ranked No. 1 on Weibo's TV Series Influence Chart and No. 3 on Douyin's TV Series Chart; No. 2 on Maoyan's All-Network Popularity Chart and No. 2 on Maoyan's Online Popularity Chart; No. 1 on Yunhe's Comprehensive Public Sentiment Popularity Chart; No. 1 on the Detawen TV Drama Prosperity Index; No. 2 on Kuyun's All-Platform Popularity Ranking; No. 2 on Vlinkage's TV Drama Viewing Index; and No. 2 on Xunyi's Web Series Index Chart.
