= Xin Yunlai =

Chinese actor (born 1994)

- 辛云来
- Pronunciation: Xīn Yúnlái
- Born: September 22, 1994 (age 31); Wuxi City, Jiangsu Province
- Education: Wuxi Technician College
- Occupation: Actor
- Years active: 2016-present
- Employer: Enlight Media
- Notable work: Cry Me A Sad River; My Blue Summer
- Height: 1.83 m (6 ft 0 in)

Chinese name
- Traditional Chinese: 辛雲來
- Simplified Chinese: 辛云来
Transcriptions
Standard Mandarin
- Hanyu Pinyin: Xīn Yúnlái

Xin Yunlai (Chinese: 辛云来; pinyin: Xīn Yúnlái; born September 22, 1994) is a Chinese actor under Enlight Media. He was born in Wuxi City, Jiangsu Province. In 2016, he joined the Chinese boy group Attack! Bigboy and officially entered the entertainment industry. Yunlai made his acting debut on 2018 when he played Gu Senxi in the 2018 Chinese film Cry Me A Sad River. Since then, he has appeared in various films and television dramas, including the 2019 time-traveling historical romance drama, Dreaming Back to the Qing Dynasty.

== Career ==
=== 2018–2019: Acting debut ===
On September 21, 2018, Xin Yunlai made his acting debut when he played the role of Gu Senxiang's twin brother Gu Senxi in the youth campus film Cry Me A Sad River, with Zhao Yingbo, Ren Min and Zhang Ruonan. The film earned 357 million yuan at the box office. In the same year, he made his television debut when he co-starred with Li Guangjie, Fei Qiming and Sun Qian in the youth campus drama Waiting for You in the Future, in which he played Chen Tong, a guy who turned from enemies into friends with Liu Dazhi (Li Guangjie). On December 13, he won the Online Actor of the Year Award in the 9th Niu Er Entertainment Festival industry interconnection.

In October 2019, it was announced that he will be starring in the online drama Mr Honesty with Chen Shimin, Liang Jie and Liu Haikuan to be released in June 2020. He played the role of Fang Zhiyou, a CEO of an architecture company. On December 14, he co-starred in the historical drama Dreaming Back to the Qing Dynasty with Li Landi and Wang Anyu, in which he played the arrogant, brave and wise fourteenth brother Aisin-Gioro Yinti. This was also the first time he played in a historical-themed film and television work.

=== 2020–present: The Blessed Girl, The Pioneer, and My Blue Summer ===
On December 4, 2020, Yunlai had a quick appearance in the romantic fantasy movie The End of Endless Love, starring Zhang Ruonan and Sun Chenjun.

On January 29, 2021, Yunlai played Yin Xiao in the ancient costume adventure fantasy drama The Blessed Girl co-starring Zhao Jinmai and Yuan Hong. On July 1, the film The Pioneer was released, in which Yunlai played Deng Zhongxia. On September 29, it was announced that together with Yan Ni, Yao Chen, and Wang Luodan, Yunlai will be part of the family drama Gone Grandma. On September 30, the youth comedy film The Water Boys was released nationwide, in which Yunlai played Zhang Wei, an ordinary-looking and middle-range sophomore. Yunlai worked with his co-stars Feng Xiangkun, Li Xiaoqian, Wu Junting, Wang Chuan in co-producing the movie's ending song.

On January 29, 2022, the youth campus drama I Don't Want To Be Brothers With You starring Chen Youwei and Lu Fangsheng was broadcast on Mango TV, in which Yunlai played the role of Gao Yang. In February 14 of the same year, Yunlai played the role of Lu Liu in the film Ten Years of Loving You. On May 20, the film Stay With Me was released, in which Yunlai played Xu Jiashu. On June 2, The film My Blue Summer, co-starring Zhang Xueying, was released, in which Yunlai played Sheng Huainan. Yunlai also starred in the suspense drama Desire Catcher and played the young criminal police officer Luo Fei. On June 14, the filming of the costume drama The Legend of Shen Li started. In November, Yunlai participated in the 2022 China Golden Rooster Hundred Flowers Film Festival and the opening ceremony of the 35th China's Golden Rooster Film Awards.

== Early life ==
Xin Yunlai was born on September 22, 1994, in Wuxi City, Jiangsu Province.

== Works ==
=== Filmography ===
==== Film ====
Year	English Title	Chinese Title	Role	Notes	Ref(s)
2018	Cry Me a Sad River	悲伤逆流成河	Gu Senxi	Main role, acting debut	
2020	The End of Endless Love	如果声音不记得	Roadside boy	Cameo	
2021	The Pioneer	革命者	Deng Zhongxia	Main role	
2021	Water Boys	五个扑水的少年	Zhang Wei	Main role	
2022	Ten Years of Loving You	十年一品温如言	Lu Liu	Support role	
2022	Stay With Me	我是真的讨厌异地恋	Xu Jiashu	Main role	
2022	My Blue Summer	暗恋·橘生淮南	Sheng Huainan	Main role	
2025	The One	独一无二	Yu Zhou	Main role	

==== Television series ====
Year	English Title	Chinese Title	Role	Notes	Ref(s)
2019	Waiting for You in the Future	我在未来等你	Chen Tong	Support Role	
2019	Dreaming Back to the Qing Dynasty	梦回	Aisin-Gioro Yinti	Support Role	
2020	Don't Lie To Your Lover (Mr Honesty)	不说谎恋人	Fang Zhiyou	Main Role	
2021	The Blessed Girl	玲珑	Yin Xiao	Support Role	
2022	I Don't Want To Be Brothers With You	我要和你做兄弟	Gao Yang	Main Role	
2023	Desire Catcher	无眠之境	Luo Fei	Main Role	
2023	Gone Grandma	外婆的新世界	Fang Keqi	Guest Role	
2024	The Legend of Shen Li	与凤行	Mo Fang	Support Role	
2024	In Between	半熟男女	Qu Yipeng	Main Role	
2025	The Glory	雁回时	Fu Yunxi	Main Role	
2026	Loving Strangers	秋雪漫过的冬天	Jiang Jialu	Guest Role	
2026	Xiao Fang	小芳	Qi Xiaowei	Main Role	
TBA	A Ming Dynasty Adventure	明月录	Wang Daxia	Main Role	
TBA	Nin Hao, Yue Fu Da Ren	您好，岳父大人	Chen Taishan	Main Role	

=== Discography ===
==== Singles ====
Year	Title	Notes	Ref(s)
2018	"Yesterday's Blue Sky"	Movie promotional song of the same name	
2021	"Ordinary" (Youth Version)	The ending song of the movie "Water Boys"	

== Awards and nominations ==
Year	Award	Category	Result	Ref(s)
2018	9th Niu Er Entertainment Festiva	Online Actor of the Year Award	Won	
