= Till Death Tear Us Apart =

Chinese web series

- Promotional poster
- Chinese: 愉 此 一生;
- Genre: Historical drama; Romance; Drama
- Based on: Love in a Blaze / A Lifetime Love by Nan Zhi
- Written by: Bi Yanwei
- Directed by: Cheng Peng
- Starring: Jiang Zi-le; Yan Zidong; Lu Zhuo; Yang Kai-cheng; Zhou Yi; Jiang Shi-men; Zhang Yi-chang; Hong Yue
- Country of origin: China
- Original language: Chinese
- No. of seasons: 1
- No. of episodes: 15

Production
- Running time: 20 minutes
- Production company: Beijing Century Media Culture Co.

Original release
- Release: 14 February – 15 February 2017

Till Death Tear Us Apart (Chinese, 愉 此 一生; pinyin, Yu ci Yisheng) is a Chinese web series released on February 14, 2017, by QQLive. The series was directed by Cheng Peng, written by Bi Yanwei, and starred Jiang Zi-le and Yan Zi-dong . The series is based on the novel Love in a Blaze / A Lifetime Love by Nan Zhi. The series was broadcast exclusively on Tencent Holdings' Tencent Video site. since February 14, 2017, although most of the episodes were censored by the Chinese authorities shortly after their premiere.

== Synopsis ==
The story is set in China in 1944. The country is divided by a long civil war between the Communist Party and the Nationalist Party (also called the Kuomintang). Liu Yu-sheng (Jiang Zi-le) is a young man from a wealthy family who, after returning from studying abroad, discovers that his inheritance has been stolen by other members of his family. To earn a living, he gets a job as a teacher in a small rural school. Courteous and idealistic, Liu Yu-sheng appears to be the perfect person; what nobody knows is that he is a communist who works secretly from the shadows. One day, he meets an old schoolmate, Zhou Yao-hua (Yan Zi-dong), and love soon begins to emerge between the two young people. However, Zhou Yao-hua is a nationalist and like most people in the country, he hates communists. Thus begins Yu-sheng's difficult decision-making, whose loyalty will be divided between his job as an informant and his love for Zhou Yao-hua.

== Cast and characters ==
=== Main ===
- Jiang Zi Le as Liu Yusheng
- Yan Zi Dong as Zhou Yaohua
- Lu Zhuo as Ah Yan
- Liu Yi Chen as Liu Yishao

=== Supporting ===
- Chen Peng as Policeman Feng
- Yang Kai Cheng as Ah Kuan
- Zhou Yi as Zhou Yaomin
- Zhang Yi Chang as Zhao Jiali
- Jiang Shi Meng as Chang Yue'e
- Hong Yue as Mu Caiyi
- Karl Robert Eislen as Lu Simu (voiced by Shang Hong)
- Jiang Chao as Policeman Sun
- Liang Tian as Zhao Dingsheng (voiced by Shang Hong)
- Shen Bao Ping as Zhou Zongfu
- Qiu Dong Jiang as Policeman Han
- Yang Yong as Du Bianchun
- Lu Jian Wei as Old Wei
- Dai Ming as Old Wu
- Fu Ling Jun as Wang Ma
- Li Zong Han as Second mister
- Geng Zhen Xuan as Mister Qiao
- Li Chun Yi as Xiao Yang
- Liu Chong Mo as Secretary Li
- Yang Huan as Agent Head

== Production ==
The series was announced on November 8, 2016. A promotional trailer was released n November 10. Although the story is based on a novel, the series itself was created as a continuation of Love is More Than a Word, which was canceled in September 2016 by the Chinese authorities, leaving unfinished and unresolved plots. The main cast of the series was led by same actors from Love is More Than a Word, hinting at the idea of reincarnation of the characters.

== Censorship ==
The series, like its predecessor, was censored by Chinese authorities, which resulted in many of the episodes being shortened or romantic scenes between the characters being removed. Love is More Than a Word and Till Death Tear Us Apart were not the first gay-themed series to suffer censorship from the authorities; the popular series Addicted suffered the same fate, prompting several campaigns and complaints about the decision.
