= A Date with the Future =

2023 Chinese television series

- Simplified Chinese: 照亮你
- Hanyu Pinyin: Zhào liàng nǐ
- Genre: Romance; Drama
- Based on: Shi Guang Ru Yue by Xiao Lu
- Written by: Li Jie
- Directed by: Jin Sha; Yu Bo
- Starring: William Chan; Zhang Ruonan
- Opening theme: "Illuminate" (照亮) by Aska Yang; "If You Also Love This World" (如果你也深爱这世界) by Chen Xueran
- Ending theme: "Came Searching for Light" (寻光而来) by Angela Hui
- Country of origin: China
- Original language: Mandarin
- No. of seasons: 1
- No. of episodes: 36

Production
- Producers: Fang Fang; Yu Haiyan
- Production location: Shenzhen
- Running time: 45 minutes
- Production company: Tencent Penguin Pictures

Original release
- Network: Tencent Video; Jiangsu TV
- Release: June 2 – June 20, 2023

A Date with the Future (Chinese: 照亮你; pinyin: Zhào liàng nǐ) is a 2023 Chinese television series based on the novel Shi Guang Ru Yue (时光如约) by Xiao Lu (筱露), starring William Chan and Zhang Ruonan. The series started filming on November 19, 2021, at Shenzhen and finished in April 2022.

The series premiered on June 2, 2023 on Jiangsu TV and Tencent Video in mainland China. It was also aired on the same day on Viu, WeTV, Starhub, Astro, Viki and various other platforms in Singapore, Malaysia, Vietnam, Thailand, Indonesia, Philippines, Japan, South Korea, Europe and USA.

== Synopsis ==
During an earthquake rescue mission, firefighter Jin Shichuan (William Chan) made a 10-year promise to Xu Lai (Zhang Ruonan) in order to calm her down. Ten years later, Xu Lai returns as a journalist who is also a search dog trainer. Together with Jin Shichuan, who is now a fire station captain, they work together to fulfill that promise.

== Cast ==
Actor	Character	Introduction
William Chan	Jin Shichuan	Fire station captain
Zhang Ruonan	Xu Lai	News journalist
Ren Hao	Lu Fangqi	Firefighter
Ci Sha	Huo Yanzong	Company CEO
Luo Qiuyun	Zang Qiu	Doctor
Jia Nai	Yu Shishi	Actress
Li Jianyi	Jin Xueyi	Jin Shichuan's grandfather
Jiang Hongpo	Lin Quan	Xu Lai's mother
Huo Qing	Xu Chengyun	Xu Lai's father
Zheng Xiaoning	Wen Qingguo	Fire station chief
Zhou Shuai	Liu Xu	Firefighter
Yuan Mingze	Zhang Yang	Firefighter
Wang Yuqin	Shi Lei	Firefighter
Zhao Rui	Tao Zi	Firefighter
Li Chengyu	Da Peng	Firefighter
Qiu Henan	Han Fang	Xu Lai and Huo Yanzong's friend
Mao Xuewen	Jiang Xin	News journalist
Li Junhao	Xiao Zhou	Intern journalist
Dai Xiangyu	Qin Ye	TV station news department team leader
Wang Zirui	Fang Huai	Firefighter, Jin Shichuan's friend
Xu Rongzhen	Ms Lu	TV station deputy head

== Soundtrack ==
A Date with the Future Original Soundtrack
No.	Title	Lyrics	Music	Performer	Length
1.	"Illuminate (照亮)" (First opening theme song)	Zhang Ying	Shi Yang	Aska Yang	3:39
2.	"Came Searching for Light (寻光而来)" (Ending theme song)	Sun Aili	Sun Aili, Han Yunxin	Angela Hui	3:55
3.	"If You Also Love This World (如果你也深爱这世界)" (Second opening theme song)	Ming Tian	Chen Xueran	Chen Xueran	4:22
4.	"Have You Let It Go (你放下了么)"	Zhang Pengpeng	Zheng Guofeng	Zhang Yuan	4:38
5.	"Day Dream"	Chen Xueran, Ming Tian	Chen Xueran	Mimi Lee, Chen Xueran	3:32

== Production ==
Due to controversies surrounding 2 of the actors in this drama, their faces were digitally replaced using artificial intelligence during post production. Originally, the characters of Qin Ye and Fang Huai were played by actors Wang Qiang and Xu Kaicheng respectively.
