= Ci Sha =

Chinese actor

- 此沙
- Born: Nuosu Muguregu Jiwucisha; May 3, 1997 (age 29); Liangshan Yi Autonomous Prefecture, Sichuan, China
- Education: Sichuan Film and Television Academy
- Occupation: Actor

Chinese name
- Simplified Chinese: 诺苏·木古惹古·吉乌此沙
- Traditional Chinese: 諾蘇·木古惹古·吉烏此沙
Transcriptions
Standard Mandarin
- Hanyu Pinyin: Nuòsū Mùgǔrěgǔ Jíwūcǐshā

Ci Sha (Chinese: 此沙; born May 3, 1997) is a Chinese actor of Yi ethnicity. He is known for his roles Guo Jing in the TV series The Legend of Heroes and Yang Jian in the film series Creation of the Gods.

== Early life and education ==
Ci Sha was born on May 3, 1997, in Sike Township, Butuo County, Liangshan Yi Autonomous Prefecture, Sichuan. At the age of 8, Ci Sha was sent to study in the county seat and got the inspiration of acting through watching films of Bruce Lee and Jackie Chan.

Admitted into Sichuan Film and Television College, Ci Sha goes to the Performance Department of Beijing Film Academy for further study in 2017.

== Career ==
In 2020, Ci Sha starred in the fantasy adventure movie The Sea Monster. In 2021, he starred in the movies The Legend of Muye: Tomb Seeking Master and 1921. In October 2022, he participated in the filming of The Legend of Heroes, where he played the role of Guo Jing.

Ci Sha made a guest appearance as Prince Ke Erke in The Longest Promise, and played Yang Jian in Creation of the Gods I: Kingdom of Storms and Creation of the Gods II: Demon Force.

In October 2023, he co-starred with Andy Lau and Nicholas Tse in the film Raging Havoc.

In 2025, he landed a lead role in the crime action film The Shadow's Edge alongside Jackie Chan and Tony Leung Ka-fai.

== Filmography ==
=== Film ===
Key
†	Denotes films that have not yet been released

List of film performances
Year	Title		Role	Notes	Ref.
Year	English	Chinese	Role	Notes	Ref.
2021	1921	1921	Yoichi Shigeta		
2021	The Warrior from Sky	神墓	Chen Nan		
2021	The Legend of Muye: Tomb Seeking Master	牧野诡事之观山太保	Feng Sijiu		
2023	The Sea Monster	大海怪	Lin Xiao		
2023	Creation of the Gods I: Kingdom of Storms	封神第一部：朝歌风云	Yang Jian		
2024	She's Got No Name	酱园弄·悬案	Chen Kaizhou		
2024	Burning Stars	孤星计划	Jiang Yue		
2024	Promise of Decades	多想和你再见一面	Qiao Mingzhuang		
2025	Creation of the Gods II: Demon Force	封神第二部：战火西岐	Yang Jian		
2025	The Shadow's Edge	捕风追影	Xi Wang / Xi Meng / Xi Tai		
2026	Blades of the Guardians	镖人：风起大漠	Heyi Xuan		
TBA	Things Beyond Romance †	花花女子	Zhang Dian		
TBA	Mastermind †	偵戰	Yeung Jok		
TBA	Raging Havoc †	怒火漫延			

=== Television series ===
Key
†	Denotes television series that have not yet been released

List of television drama performances
Year	Title		Role	Notes	Ref.
Year	English	Chinese	Role	Notes	Ref.
2021	Forever and Ever	一生一世	Mei Xing		
2022	The Blue Whisper	驭鲛记	Li Shu		
2023	Pledge of Allegiance	山河之影	Li Dongfang		
2023	A Date with the Future	照亮你	Huo Yanzong		
2023	The Longest Promise	玉骨遥	Prince Ke Erke		
2024	The Legend of Heroes	金庸武侠世界	Guo Jing		
2024	The Rise of Ning	锦绣安宁	Lu Jiaxue		
2026	A Splendid Match	良陈美锦	Chen Yanyun		
TBA	Hua Jian Jiu Ren Jian Yue †	花间酒人间月	Qin Lang		
TBA	The Way Home †	欢聚	Yu Zhongyi		
