= She's Got No Name =

2024 Chinese-Hong Kong film by Peter Chan

- Theatrical release poster
- Chinese: 酱园弄·悬案
- Directed by: Peter Chan
- Screenplay by: Shi Ling; Jiang Feng; Shang Yang; Pan Yiran
- Based on: Reversal of the Case by Jiang Feng
- Produced by: Peter Chan; Jojo Hui; Zhang Ziyi; William Kong; Jason Siu
- Starring: Zhang Ziyi
- Cinematography: Jake Pollock
- Edited by: Zhang Yibo; William Chang
- Music by: Natalie Holt; Yu Fei
- Production companies: Tianjin Maoyan Media; Huanxi Media; China Film Group; We Pictures; JQ Pictures; Beijing Radio and Television Station; Shanghai Entertainment Team Media Group; China Movie Channel; Shanghai Film Group; Edko Films; AMTD Digital; Emperor Motion Pictures; iQIYI; Tencent Pictures; Youku Pictures; Happy Sunshine; Huaxia Film
- Distributed by: Tianjin Maoyan Media; We Distribution Limited
- Release dates: 24 May 2024 (Cannes); 21 June 2025 (China)
- Running time: 150 minutes
- Countries: China; Hong Kong
- Languages: Mandarin; Shanghainese
- Box office: US$52.3 million

She's Got No Name (Chinese: 酱园弄·悬案; pinyin: Jiàngyuán nòng·xuán'àn) is a 2024 crime drama film directed and produced by Peter Chan, and featuring an ensemble cast led by Zhang Ziyi. It is based on a true story of an unsolved murder case in Shanghai and later adapted into the non-fiction novel Reversal of the Case by Jiang Feng, and follows a housewife who is accused of the gruesome murder of her husband.

The film had its world premiere out of competition of the 2024 Cannes Film Festival on 24 May. It was theatrically released in China on 21 June 2025.

== Plot ==
Set in a bustling alleyway during the Japanese occupation of Shanghai in the 1940s, the film centres on a wife, Zhan Zhou, who was being charged with the bloody dismemberment of her husband – a killing that seems impossible for her to have committed alone. The murder thrusts Zhan into the spotlight and the court of public opinion, forcing her towards a fate intertwined with that of her own country.

== Cast ==
- Zhang Ziyi as Zhan Zhou
  - Du Kani as young Zhan Zhou
  - Zhao Shuzhen as elderly Zhan Zhou
- Eric Wang as Big Bear
  - Li Haoze as young Big Bear
- Jackson Yee as Song
- Mei Ting as Wang Chen
- Zhao Liying as Xi Lin
  - Zhao Wanyu as young Xi Lin
- Lei Jiayin as Xue Zhiwu
  - Han Haolin as young Xue Zhiwu
- Liu Runxuan as Nala
- Zhang Yu as Dr. Liang
- Anna Kirke as Nanny
- Yang Mi as Wang Xumei
  - Wu Ruoming as young Wang Xumei
- Kang Chunlei as Kang Zhongliang
- Zhang Yulin as Zhan Zhou actress
- Peng Yuchang as Cai
- Yin Fang as Zhang Yan
- Chen Guoqing as Prosecutor
- Zhang Jianya as Zhang Jinzhao
- Zhou Yemang as Wang Yiyang
- Da Peng as Ho Huixian
- Li Xian as Zhang Baofu
- Xu Xiang as Supervisor
- Sun Qiang as Judge
- Fan Wei as Ye Boxiu
- Ci Sha as Chen Kaizhou
- Wang Yang
- Zhang Zifeng as Ye Nianzhi
  - Pei Jiaxin as young as Ye Nianzhi
- Xie Na
- Kong Lingmei
- Zhou Siyu
- Bai Yufan
- Lin Yongjian
- Zhang Xueying

== Production ==
The film was in early development in June 2015, and principal photography began in December 2023. A big set was built in Zhapu, Hongkou, Shanghai to recreate the real Jiangyuan Lane in the 1940s.

Filming officially wrapped on 6 March 2024, and the cast and crew held the wrap party one day later. On 17 April 2024, the film's cast was revealed.

== Release ==
She's Got No Name was selected to be screened out of competition at the 77th Cannes Film Festival, where it had its world premiere on 24 May 2024.

At the Cannes Film Festival, Peter Chan, along with the cast including Zhang Ziyi, Lei Jiayin, Eric Wang, Dong Chengpeng, Yang Mi, Li Xian and Ci Sha, attended the red carpet premiere.

On May 20, 2025, the film was selected as the opening film for the 27th Shanghai International Film Festival on June 13. The film is going to be released in two parts. The first part is set for release on June 21 where it has a duration of 96 minutes and carries the same English title, She's Got No Name.

== Soundtrack ==
The theme song She's Got No Name is a duet by Gigi Yim, and produced by Wan Pin Chu and Roland Ng Lok Shing. English version theme song Music and lyrics by Diane Warren duet by Beijing Angel Children's Choir.
