= When I Fly Towards You =

- Promotional poster
- Chinese: 当我飞奔向你
- Hanyu Pinyin: Dāng wǒ fēi bēn xiàng nǐ
- Genre: Romantic comedy; Coming-of-age
- Based on: She's a Little Crazy (她病的不轻) by Zhu Yi (竹已)
- Screenplay by: Yue An; Tao Kaixin
- Directed by: Mao Deshu
- Starring: Zhou Yiran; Zhang Miaoyi
- Opening theme: When I Run To You (当我奔向你) by Lin Chenyang
- Ending theme: I Think I Will (我想我会) by Yin Luxi
- Country of origin: China
- Original language: Chinese
- No. of episodes: 24

Production
- Executive producer: Cheng Xiao Yu
- Production locations: Qingdao, Xiamen
- Running time: 30 minutes
- Production companies: Youku Information Technology (Beijing) Co., Ltd. Hangzhou Youyisi Film and Television Culture Media; Beijing Naifei Technology Co., Ltd. Hangzhou Feiben Entertainment Media Co., Ltd. Shanhe Wanwu Film and Television Media Nanjing Co., Ltd. Yefu Films (Beijing) Co., Ltd.

Original release
- Network: Youku
- Release: June 13 – June 29, 2023

When I Fly Towards You (Chinese: 当我飞奔向你; pinyin: Dāng wǒ fēi bēn xiàng nǐ) is a 2023 Chinese coming-of-age romantic comedy streaming television series directed by Mao Deshu. The drama was adapted from the web novel She's a Little Crazy by Zhu Yi, and stars Zhou Yiran and Zhang Miaoyi as both male and female leads respectively. The series aired on Youku from June 13 to June 29, 2023.

The drama received positive responses from critics and audiences, and earned both local and international success. The drama is also being streamed globally on Netflix and YouTube.

== Synopsis ==
In the early autumn of 2012, Jiangyi High School welcomes a cheerful transfer student named Su Zai-zai (Zhang Miaoyi). On the first day of school, Su Zai-zai encounters the cool and aloof Zhang Lu-rang (Zhou Yiran), and falls in love with him at first sight.

Behind Lu-rang's academic performance and privileged family background, he is a contradictory person - someone who appears to be quite confident on the outside, yet constantly doubts himself on the inside. Due to the presence of his clever younger brother Zhang Lu-li, Lu-rang is constantly compared to him by his mother. For over a decade, Lu-rang's life has been very sheltered. He is introverted and speaks little. He looks composed and polite, but keeps everyone at a distance.

However, Lu-rang's life changes when he meets the bubbly and forward Zai-zai, and joins hands with old and new friends Gu Ran, Guan Fang, and Su Zai-zai's best friend, Jiang Jia. They help him understand the meaning of one's self and he slowly begins to understand how to plan his life. Lu-rang and Zai-zai work towards their goals while supporting one another, as romance begins to blossom throughout their friend group.

== Cast ==
=== Main ===
- Zhou Yi Ran (周翊然) as Zhang Lu Rang (张陆让)

A cool and aloof high school student who transferred from Suyang No.1 High School. He lives with his uncle during his time in Jiangyi.

- Zhang Miao Yi (张淼怡) as Su Zai Zai (苏在在)

An energetic and cheerful high school student who gets along well with other people and develops a romantic interest with Zhang Lu Rang.

=== Supporting ===
- Bian Tian Yang (邊天揚) as Gu Ran (顾然)

Zhang Lu Rang's best friend. He later develops feelings for Jiang Jia.

- Jiang Zhi Nan (姜之南) as Jiang Jia (姜佳)

Su Zai Zai's best friend who later falls in love with Gu Ran.

- Guo Zhe (郭喆) as Guan Fang (关放)

A part of the friend group. He lives with his grandmother and brings humor to the group. He has no romantic storyline.

- Feng Xiang Kun (冯祥琨) as Shen Qian Yu (沈谦宇)

An attractive senior in Jiangyi High School. Jiang Jia's initial love interest.

- Roy Xie (谢兴阳) as Xie Lin Nan (谢林楠)

Su Zai Zai's senior who is a president of her department at the East China University. He develops feelings for Su Zai Zai.

- Gao Wen Feng (高文峰) as Lin Mao (林茂)

Zhang Lu Rang's uncle. He is also a math teacher in Jiangyi High School.

- Wang Jia Xuan (王佳璇) as Zhang Lu Li (张陆礼)

Zhang Lu Rang's little brother.

- Zhang Lei (张磊) as Su Jian Hua

Su Sai Zai's father.

- Chen Si Si ( 陈思斯) as Zhou Xiao Li

Su Zai Zai's mother.

- Hao Wen Ting ( 郝文婷) as Lin Yun

Zhang Lu Rang's mother.

- Wang Mu Xuan (王沐暄) as Zhu Miao
- Ning Zi (宁子) as Zhang Yan

Teacher

- Wu Xu Xu (吴栩栩) as Grandma Guan 67
- Zhao Yan Song ( 赵岩松) as Gu Yan Feng [Gu Ran's father]
- Guo Xiao Tian (郭笑天) as Xu Qi
- Olive (张子萌) as Ye Zhen Xin
- Zhang Xin tong (张新童) as Xia Ning
- Cao Dan Ni (曹丹妮) as Deng Qin
- Liu Bing Lu (柳丙璐) as Fu Yao
- Li Yao Yao (李瑶瑶) as He Yu
- Wang Yu Lin (王煜霖) as Wang Nan ("Nan Shen"/"Handsome")
- Yang Jun Bai (杨均 as Father Zhang
- Zhong Xuan Kai (钟轩凯) as Cheng Wei
- Xu Ying Luo (徐樱洛) as Zhang Xiao Xiao
- Guo Zi Xin (郭子歆) as Xiao Kai
- Chang Hai Bo (常海波) as Chang Hua
- Tang Shu Ya (唐书亚) as Li En Lin
- Wang Yi Miao (王漪淼) as Wang Bei Bei
- Wu Ren Yuan (吴任远) as Jiang Jia's Father
- Zhan Ya Shu (湛雅书) as Chen Ping
- Zhang Bo Wen(张博) as Yu Xuan
- Wang Kang(王康) as Nan Sheng
- Xu Hui Qiang (许慧强) as Hao Zhun
- Zheng Jia Ming (郑佳明) as Tian Hui
- Zhang Hao Nan (张昊楠) as Zhou Hui
- Wang De Feng(王德枫) as Instructor Fang
- Ding Bo (丁博) as Chen Wen
- Lai Weiming (赖伟明) as Wen Lang
- Zhang Zi Jian (张子健) as Lecturer for Psychology Seminar

== Original soundtrack ==
No.	Title	Lyrics	Music	Singer	Length
1.	"When I Run To You (当我奔向你)" (opening theme)	Lin Chen Yang (林晨阳)	Lin Chen Yang (林晨阳)	Lin Chen Yang (林晨阳)
2.	"I Think I Will (我想我会)" (ending theme)	PureLy27	PureLy27	Yin Lu Xi (尹露浠)
3.	"Gentle Summer (轻轻的夏天)"	Lin Chen Yang (林晨阳)	Lin Chen Yang (林晨阳)	Yin Lu Xi (尹露浠)
4.	"你是不是也想和我一起走走"	PureLy27	PureLy27	Yin Lu Xi (尹露浠)
5.	"When I Walk To You (I Do) (当我走向你 (I Do))"	Yang Mo Yi (杨默依)	Dou Zhi Wen (都智文); Yang Mo Yi (杨默依)	Yang Mo Yi (杨默依)
6.	"Graduation Message (毕业留言)"	Meng Fan Ming (孟凡明)		Meng Fan Ming (孟凡明)
7.	"佩奇的夏天"			Attic Performance (阁楼演奏班)
8.	"Go With You (与你共赴)"			Hen Mei Wei (很美味)
9.	"遇见克莱因蓝"			Zhang Xi Meng (章熙梦)
10.	"Before"			Li Xue Shi (李学仕); Zhu Yunan (朱彦安)
