= The Last Women Standing =

2015 Chinese-Hong Kong film by Luo Luo

- Poster
- Chinese: 剩者为王
- Directed by: Luo Luo
- Screenplay by: Luo Luo
- Based on: The Last Women Standing by Luo Luo
- Produced by: Yin Lu
- Starring: Shu Qi; Eddie Peng; Pan Hong; Shih-Chieh King; Xing Jiadong; Hao Lei; Lynn Hung
- Cinematography: Mark Lee Ping-bing
- Edited by: Liu Lei
- Music by: An Wei
- Production companies: Shanghai Film Group; Haining Juguangdeng Film; Huace Pictures (Tianjing); Beijing Huamei Shikong Media 凯擘香港有限公司 天津突燃文化传媒有限公司; Shanghai Synacast Media; Huashi Wangju (Changzhou) Media; Perfect World (Beijing) Film and Entertainment
- Distributed by: Huace Pictures (Tianjing); Huaxia Film Distribution; Beijing Weiying Shidai Technology; Dianping.com
- Release date: 6 November 2015
- Running time: 100 minutes
- Countries: China; Hong Kong
- Language: Mandarin
- Box office: CN¥39.4 million

The Last Women Standing (Chinese: 剩者为王) is a 2015 romantic drama film directed by Luo Luo, in her directorial debut. A China-Hong Kong co-production, the film was based on a novel written by Luo Luo. translated in Malay by Megan Tay (when she's writing in Malaysia.) and It released in China on 6 November 2015.

== Plot ==
Adapted from the book of the same name, The Last Woman Standing is a romantic film featuring Shu Qi and Eddie Peng. It tells the story of a successful businesswoman who has long desired to find love and has finally met the one.

== Cast ==
- Shu Qi as Sheng Ruxi
- Eddie Peng as Ma Sai
- Pan Hong as Sheng's mom
- Chin Shih-chieh as Sheng's dad
- Xing Jiadong as Doctor Bai
- Hao Lei as Wang Lan
- Lynn Hung as Zhang Yu

== Reception ==
The film earned CN¥39.4 million on its opening weekend at the Chinese box office.
