= Luo Luo =

Chinese novelist and film director (born 1982)

- 落落
- Born: Zhao Jiarong; April 30, 1982 (age 44); Shanghai, China
- Occupations: Novelist, film director

Luo Luo (Chinese: 落落) is a Chinese novelist and film director.

== Early life ==
On April 30, 1982, Luo was born as Zhao Jiarong in Shanghai, China.

== Career ==
Luo directed the 2015 film The Last Women Standing based on one of her novels. Megan Tay translated her book into Malay.

== Filmography ==
- 2015 The Last Women Standing - Director, Writer
- 2018 Cry Me a Sad River - Director, Writer
- 2020 The End of Endless Love - Writer
- 2022 Almost Love - Writer
