= Mirror: A Tale of Twin Cities =

2022 Chinese TV series

- 镜·双城
- Genre: Wuxia, Fantasy
- Based on: Mirror: Twin Cities by Cang Yue
- Directed by: Patrick Yau
- Starring: Li Yifeng; Chen Yuqi; Zheng Yecheng
- Country of origin: China
- Original language: Mandarin
- No. of episodes: 43

Production
- Production location: Hengdian
- Running time: 45 minutes
- Production companies: Huace Croton Media; Tencent Penguin Pictures

Original release
- Network: Tencent Video, Youku
- Release: 16 January – 26 February 2022

Related
- The Longest Promise

Mirror: A Tale of Twin Cities (traditional Chinese: 鏡·雙城; simplified Chinese: 镜·双城; pinyin: Jìng·Shuāng Chéng) is a 2022 Chinese streaming television series adapted from the Chinese fantasy novel Mirror: Twin Cities written by Cang Yue. The series was directed by Patrick Yau and starred Li Yifeng, Chen Yuqi, and Zheng Yecheng. Set in a fantasy world named Yun Huang (云荒), the story tells of young heirs from Quan Xian and Kong Sang tribes, fighting for the freedom of their people. The series began airing on Tencent Video and Youku from January 16, 2022. A prequel series, The Longest Promise, premiered on July 2, 2023.

== Synopsis ==
In a fantasy world called Yun Huang, there exist three tribes Quan Xian, Kong Sang, and Cang Liu. A century ago, the Cang Liu started a conspiracy and seized the empire created by Kong Sang. At the battle field, Kong Sang prince Zhen Lan fought against Cang Liu until him the last one. His power of Emperor was then sealed by Cang Liu. The six young kings of Kong Sang, including princess Bai Ying, sealed all their tribal people under the Mirror Lake in order to protect them from being massacred. After a century, the young heir Su Mo from Quan Xian allied with Kong Sang and fought together against the Cang Liu Empire. After overcoming a number of difficulties, Su Mo gained the power of Dragon God, and Zhen Lan unsealed his power of Emperor. They finally defeated the Cang Liu Empire and turned Yun Huang into a peaceful world.

== Cast ==
- Li Yifeng as Su Mo/Chun Huang (苏摹/纯煌)
  - Su Mo: the young leader of the Quan Xian tribe. He fights for the freedom for his tribal people in order to return to their home, the BiLuo Ocean. He is the lover of Bai Ying.
  - Chun Huang: (long time ago) the first emperor of the Ocean Empire.
- Chen Yuqi as Bai Ying/Bai Wei (白璎/白薇)
  - Bai Ying: princess of the Kong Sang Empire, also the 2nd disciple of the sword saint. She is the lover of Su Mo.
  - Bai Wei: (long time ago) the first queen of the Kong Sang Empire.
- Zheng Yecheng as Zhen Lan/Lang Xuan (真岚/琅玕)
  - Zhen Lan: prince of the Kong Sang Empire.
  - Lang Xuan: (long time ago) the first emperor of the Kong Sang Empire.
- Yang Zhiwen as Na Sheng (那笙)
  - A girl from the outside world of Yun Huang. She is the lover of Yan Xi.
- Liu Haikuan as Yu Huan (羽幻)
  - A general of the Cang Liu Empire, also the 3rd disciple of the sword saint.
- Ye Shengjia as Yan Xi (炎汐)
  - a deputy commander of the Quan Xian tribe. He is the lover of Na Sheng.
- Liu Chang as Xi Jing (西京)
  - A general of the Kong Sang Empire, also the 1st disciple of the sword saint.

== Production ==
- The series announced its cast members on July 31, 2020.
- The series finished filming on October 8, 2020.
- The series released the first teaser trailer on October 27, 2020.
