= Guardians of the Dafeng =

2024–2025 Chinese television series

- 大奉打更人
- Genre: Historical fiction; Fantasy; Comedy
- Based on: Dafeng Dagengren by Maibao Xiaolangjun
- Written by: Yang Yuchen
- Directed by: Deng Ke
- Starring: Dylan Wang; Tian Xiwei; Liu Yijun; Yan Zidong
- Country of origin: China
- Original language: Mandarin
- No. of seasons: 1
- No. of episodes: 40

Production
- Executive producer: Liu Wenyang
- Producers: Hou Xiaonan; Cao Huayi
- Production locations: Hengdian World Studios; Xinjiang
- Running time: 45 min
- Production companies: CCTV; New Classics Media; China Literature

Original release
- Network: CCTV-8; Tencent Video
- Release: 28 December 2024 – 25 January 2025

Guardians of the Dafeng (Chinese: 大奉打更人; pinyin: Dàfèng Dǎgēngrén) is a 2024 Chinese television drama adapted from the web novel of the same name by Paperboy. The historical adventure fantasy series is directed by Deng Ke, and stars Dylan Wang, Tian Xiwei, Liu Yijun and Yan Zidong in the lead roles. The series started airing on CCTV-8 and streaming platform Tencent Video on December 28, 2024. It is also airing internationally on WeTV, Viu and Disney+ (Taiwan).

== Synopsis ==
The mixed-genre adventure fantasy drama series tells the story of Xu Qi'an (Dylan Wang), a young man who gave up his police academy spot to work as a real estate agent. Xu finds himself transported to an unfamiliar alternative historical reality filled with Confucians, Taoists, Buddhists, demons, and sorcerers. Upon waking up, he discovers he's in a prison cell and is set to be exiled to a remote town in three days. His second uncle in this new reality in the Dafeng Dynasty, Xu Pingzhi (Yue Yang), is framed for stealing tax money, leading to the imprisonment of the entire Xu family. To save his family, Xu Qi'an uses his knowledge from criminal investigation books and his understanding of mathematics, physics, and chemistry to uncover the truth behind the theft and clear their names.

Xu Qi'an catches the attention of the city's law enforcement organization (Guardians) that reports to the emperor and becomes one of their members. He was also recruited into the Realm Society, a secretive group composed of anonymous members from various factions and sects. In the demon and magic-filled world of Dafeng, Xu initially aims only for self-preservation and a leisurely life as a wealthy man. However, his sense of justice propels him to act when his superior attempts to rape the female members of a guilty minister's family during a house search. Although he knows intervening could lead to his death, he draws his sword to uphold justice.

Chief Guardian of the night watch Lord Wei Yuan (Liu Yijun) then tasks Xu Qi'an with investigating the Sangbo Lake explosion case. Xu Qi'an successfully identifies the mastermind, removes corruption from the court, and restores peace. Unbeknownst to him, other forces were behind the Sangbo Lake explosion, and a sealed object from the lake has entered his body. Feeling like a pawn in a larger game, Xu Qi'an resolves to become a player instead, determined to uncover and confront the hidden powers.

== Cast ==
=== Main cast ===
| Actor | Character | Description |
|---|---|---|
| Dylan Wang | Xu Qi'an | The protagonist is a modern-day office worker who finds himself transported to an alternate historical reality, taking over the life of a constable Xu Qi'an (courtesy name Ning Yan). There, he navigates a web of political intrigue and supernatural beings, using his investigative skills to uncover hidden mysteries and survive the complex dynamics of this new world. |
| Tian Xiwei | Princess Lin'an | The second daughter of Emperor Yuanjing, with the title of Princess Lin'an. She is a long-suffering princess yearning for validation within the imperial family, who persists despite numerous setbacks. |
| Liu Yijun | Wei Yuan | Lord Wei commands the night watch patrol dubbed the "Guardians of Dafeng". Known as the Military God of Dafeng, Wei is deeply strategic and excels in political scheming. |
| Yan Zidong | Xu Xinnian | The eldest son of Xu Pingzhi and the cousin of Xu Qi'an, with courtesy name Ci Jiu). Smart and sharp-tongued, he studies at Yunlu Academy under Zhang Shen, specializing in military strategy. |

=== Supporting cast ===
| Actor | Character | Description |
|---|---|---|
| Yue Yang | Xu Pingzhi | Xu Qi'an's second uncle, married to Li Ru, with children Xu Xinnian, Xu Lingyue, and Xu Lingyin. |
| Zhang Xiaochen | Chu Yuanzhen | A former top imperial scholar who withdrew from officialdom, abandoned literature to pursue martial arts, and mastered the swordsmanship of the Human Sect. |
| Mao Xiaohui | Huaiqing | The eldest daughter of Emperor Yuanjing. A master strategist and supporter of Xu Qi'an. |
| Fan Shuaiqi | Nangong Qianrou | A top-ranked Golden Gong and a fourth-tier martial artist. |
| Liu Meihan | Chu Caiwei | Sixth disciple of the current Supervisor. |
| Zhang Miaoyi | Xu Lingyue | Eldest daughter of Xu Pingzhi. |
| Feng Hui | Zheng Xinghuai | The Administrative Commissioner of Chuzhou. |
| Ding Xiaoying | Wang Simo | Daughter of Grand Secretary Wang Zhenwen, engaged to Xu Xinnian |
| Yan Peilun | Song Tingfeng | A bronze member of the Guardians. |
| Wang Runze | Zhu Guangxia | A bronze member of the Guardians. |
| Wang Yiyao | Li Miaozhen | A leader of the Daoist Tianzong sect. She is highly skilled in martial arts, free-spirited. |
| Li Hongtao | Wang Zhenwen | The Grand Chancellor of the current Dafeng dynasty. |
| Li Mengyin | Su Su | A supernatural being, subordinate to Li Miaozhen. |
| Jiang Zhenyu | Fuxiang | A top courtesan in the capital. |
| Zhang Chenxiao | Zhou Li | The son of an official. |
| Kang Kang | Li Yuchun | Xu Qi'an's direct superior. |
| Ni Hongjie | Li Ru | Wife of Xu Pingzhi, Xu Qi'an's second aunt. Despite constantly complaining about Xu Qi'an's expenses, she treats him as her own child. |
| Liu Jun | Emperor Yuanjing | Emperor of Dafeng Dynasty. |
| Fan Shiqi | Yang Yan | Wei Yuan's adopted son and a Golden Gong who is Xu Qi'an's superior. |
| Du Chun | Zhenbei (Prince of Northern Border) | The Prince of Dafeng charged with protecting the northern border. |
| Qiu Xinzhi | Supervisor | The enigmatic Supervisor of Dafeng and overseer of supernatural matters. |
| Chen Xiaoyun | Mu Nanzhi | The most beautiful woman in Dafeng, reincarnation of the Flower Goddess. |
| Chen Yihan | Princess Pingyang | Daughter of Prince Yu |

== Production ==
=== Development ===
The serialized online novel Dafeng Dagenren by author Paperboy (Maibao Xiaolangjun) was completed on Qidian in August 2021. Following its conclusion, the audio drama for the novel was released, together with the animation, comic and live-action adaptions set into motion.

=== Filming ===
Filming for the Tencent Video television series began in July 2023, with New Classics Media helming the production. The majority of the series was shot in Hengdian Studios, with some of the outdoor scenes filmed in Xinjiang.

== Release ==
The series premiered in mainland China on Tencent Video starting from 28 December 2024, with early access for members. It also aired on the CCTV-8 drama channel. Besides mainland China, the drama ranked first across several streaming charts in North America, Singapore and Taiwan. The show has been licensed in 13 overseas territories and is available on platforms such as Disney+, YouTube, Rakuten Viki, Viu, Astro, and TVB. It has been translated into 14 languages and has been broadcast in regions including North America, Singapore, Korea, Hong Kong, Macau, and Taiwan.

On 3 November 2025, it was announced that the second season of Guardians of the Dafeng had been greenlit. On 25 June 2026, a concept poster for the drama series' second season was unveiled at the 2026 Tencent Video Annual Release Conference, revealing its English title, The Guardian of Fate.

== Reception ==
Guardians of the Dafeng surpassed 30,000 points on the Tencent Video popularity index, an internal performance metric for audience and production companies. It also topped the Tencent paid subscription leads generation and on demand sales charts, as the platform provided several add-on packages on top of the VIP and SVIP packages for viewers of the show. According to the KuYun performance measurement metric, the drama was the most-watched drama in the evening time slot across all terrestrial channels in China for 26 consecutive days. Additionally, Yunhe Data reported that Guardians of the Dafeng held the top spot on China's overall streaming popularity rankings for more than 16 days. As of June 2025, the series surpassed 2 billion views according to data analyses from Yunhe (Enlightent), KuYun, and QuestMobile.

== Soundtrack ==
Guardians of the Dafeng Original Soundtrack
| No. | Title | Lyrics | Music | Performer | Length |
|---|---|---|---|---|---|
| 1. | "Xu Qing An" (Theme Song) | Zhou Jieying | Hu Xiao'ou | Zhou Shen |
| 2. | "I Am Just an Ordinary Man" (Opening Theme) | GAI Zhou Yan, Fu Xiao | GAI Zhou Yan, Fu Xiao | GAI Zhou Yan |
| 3. | "Poetry Immortal" | Zhou Jieying | Hu Xiao'ou | Yu Kewei, Zao'an |
| 4. | "How Could I Know" | Zhou Jieying | Hu Xiao'ou | Curley G |
| 5. | ""Who Goes There"" | Zhou Jieying | Hu Xiao'ou | Lars Huang |
| 6. | "Utopia" | Zhou Jieying | Hu Xiao'ou | Xu Ziwei |
| 7. | "Moon in Hand" | Zhou Jieying | Hu Xiao'ou | Bo Yuan |
