= The Longest Promise =

2023 Chinese television series

- Promotional poster
- Also known as: Zhu Yan; Jade Bone Ballad
- Genre: Xianxia; Romance
- Based on: Zhu Yan by Cang Yue
- Directed by: Jiang Jia Jun
- Starring: Xiao Zhan; Ren Min
- Country of origin: China
- Original language: Mandarin
- No. of seasons: 1
- No. of episodes: 40 (43 on Netflix)

Production
- Producer: Li Er Yun
- Production location: Hengdian World Studios
- Running time: 45 minutes
- Production companies: Tencent Penguin Pictures; Jinghe Media

Original release
- Network: Tencent Video
- Release: July 2 – July 20, 2023

Related
- Mirror: A Tale of Twin Cities

The Longest Promise (Chinese: 玉骨谣; pinyin: Yù gǔ yáo) is a 2023 Chinese television series starring Xiao Zhan and Ren Min. The series is based on the xianxia romance novel Zhu Yan by Cang Yue. It is the prequel of the 2021 series Mirror: A Tale of Twin Cities. The series premiered on Tencent Video and WeTV on July 2, 2023, and concluded on July 20, 2023, with a total of 40 episodes.

== Synopsis ==
Shi Ying is the crown prince of Kongsang. However, after being framed by the imperial consort Qiu Shui, he had to fake his death to escape from the palace. He was sent to Jiuyi mountain to cultivate. Later, he meets Zhu Yan, a princess of Chi Yi clan, who becomes his disciple

== Cast and characters ==
=== Main ===
- Xiao Zhan as Shi Ying
  - Jian Yuxi as young Shi Ying

The former crown prince of Kongsang, and the priest of grand preceptor.

- Ren Min as Zhu Yan
  - Li Xiyuan as young Zhu Yan

The princess of Chi Yi clan, and Shi Ying's disciple.

=== Supporting ===
Kongsang Royal Family

- Zeng Li as Bai Yan

The empress of Kongsang, and Shi Ying's mother.

- He Shengming as Emperor Beimian
- Ye Shengjia as Shi Yu

Shi Ying's younger half-brother.

- Chen Zijan as Qing Yun

An imperial consort, and Shi Yu's mother.

- Chen Xinyu as Qiu Shui

A merfolk and imperial consort.

Jiuyi Mountain

- Han Dong as Da Si Ming

The high priest of grand preceptor.

- Li Mingde as Chong Ming

A divine bird of Jiuyi mountain.

Bai Clan

- Wang Churan as Bai Xuelu
- Lu Yuxiao as Bai Xueying
- Zhang Lei as Bai Jing'an

The king of Bai clan.

- Fan Linfeng as Bai Fenglin

Chi Yi Clan

- Guo Jun as Zhu Gaozhao

King of Chi Yi clan, and Zhu Yan's father.

- Yang Mingna as Zhu Changxiang

Zhu Gaozhao's wife, and Zhu Yan's mother

- Ding Jie as Yu Fei

Zhu Yan's maid.

Merfolk Clan

- Fang Yilun as Zhi Yuan

Others

- Wang Ziqi as Qing Gang

The leader of Shadow Warriors.

- Yu Xuanchen as Lan Xiqiao
- Gallen Lo as Emperor Xing Zun

The founder of Kongsang continent.

- Zhang Shuangli as Reverend Xuan Zhen
- Ruan Shengwen as Qing Dongfang

The king of Azure clan.

- Wang Yiyao as Ru Yi

Huo Tu Tribe

- Hei Zi as Old Lord
- Hu Caihong as Big Consort
- Ci Sha as Prince Ke Erke

Zhu Yan's marriage partner

- Tong Hu as Big Wizard

== Production ==
Principal photography commenced in March 2021 in the Hengdian World Studios. Filming of the series was completed in August 2021. On March 29, 2021, the official Weibo of The Longest Promise announced the lineup and released the posters of the lead cast.
