= Zhou Yiran =

Chinese actor and singer

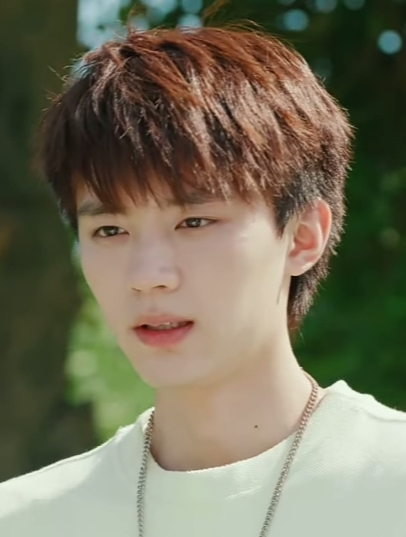
- Zhou for the drama The Sweetest Secret
- Born: Zhou Haoran; 22 November 2000 (age 25); Chongqing, China
- Other names: Zhou Yiran; Fang Xiangrui
- Education: Fengxian Experimental Middle School
- Occupations: Actor, singer
- Years active: 2017–present
- Agents: Tongle Entertainment; Zhou Yiran Studio
- Height: 183 cm (6 ft 0 in)

Chinese name
- Traditional Chinese: 周翊然
- Simplified Chinese: 周翊然
Transcriptions
Standard Mandarin
- Hanyu Pinyin: Zhōu Yìrán

Zhou Haoran (Chinese: 周浩然; pinyin: Zhōu Hàorán, born 22 November 2000), also known by his stage name Zhou Yiran (Chinese: 周翊然; pinyin: Zhōu Yìrán) or Fang Xiangrui (Chinese: 方翔锐; pinyin: Fāng Xiángruì), is a Chinese actor and singer. He gained recognition for his supporting roles in The Bond (2021), A Little Mood for Love (2021-2022) and Twenty Your Life On 2 (2022) before taking on leading roles in the television series You Are Desire (2023), When I Fly Towards You (2023), Reborn (2025), Twelve Letters (2025) and Generation to Generation (2026), which gave him recognition internationally.

== Career ==
Zhou began his career in the entertainment industry as a trainee under Original Plan Entertainment and debuted in 2017 as a member of the boy group Yi'an Musical under the stage name Fang Xiangrui. Following his departure from the group in 2018, he transitioned to acting and made his film debut in the youth comedy Go Brother!, adapted from the popular webcomic of the same name.

Over the next several years, Zhou built his acting résumé through supporting roles in a variety of youth and family dramas, including Falling into Your Smile (2021), Please Classmate (2021), and the critically acclaimed family drama The Bond (2021), the latter of which earned praise for its emotional depth and introduced him to a wider audience beyond the youth-drama genre.

Zhou achieved breakthrough success in 2023 with his first major leading role in the campus romance series When I Fly Towards You. His performance as the reserved yet dependable Zhang Lurang resonated strongly with viewers and contributed to the drama's widespread popularity both in China and internationally. He expanded beyond the youth-romance genre with a series of diverse projects, including the dramas Reborn and Twelve Letters in 2025, both of which were commended by critics for showcasing his growing versatility and his ability to carry more complex narratives as a leading actor.

In 2026, Zhou starred as Mu Qingyan in the wuxia drama Generation to Generation, adapted from the novel Ten Years of Lamplight in the Rainy Nights of Jianghu, which raised his profile. He currently stars in the drama Ashes to Crown (2026).

== Endorsements ==
In September 2023, Zhou was selected as brand ambassador for premium beauty brand The Whoo (The History of Whoo). In December, Zhou appeared in Gucci's Lunar New Year Collection 2024 "The Year of the Dragon" campaign alongside Tian Xiwei.

On February 1, 2024, Italian luxury fashion house Bulgari officially announced Zhou as the brand ambassador of Bulgari Fragrances and Perfumes. In the same month, Zhou was selected as brand ambassador for jewelry brand APM Monaco. On April 22, French luxury beauty house Guerlain announced Zhou as the skincare ambassador.

In September 2025, Zhou was named a global ambassador for French luxury brand AMI Paris.

== Filmography ==
=== Film ===
| Year | English title | Chinese title | Role | Notes/Ref. |
|---|---|---|---|---|
| 2018 | Go Brother! | 快把我哥帶走 | Wan Sui | |

=== Television series ===
| Year | English title | Chinese title | Role | Notes/Ref. |
|---|---|---|---|---|
| 2020 | The Legend of Jin Yan | 凤归四时歌 | Zhong Li | |
| 2020 | Boom! Boom! | 拳拳四重奏 | Xiao Qianye | |
| 2020 | Twenty Your Life On | 二十不惑 | Yin Shang | |
| 2021 | Falling into Your Smile | 你微笑時很美 | Ai Jia | |
| 2021 | Please Classmate | 拜託了班長 | Ye Jingxi | |
| 2021 | The Bond | 喬家的兒女 | Qiao Qiqi | |
| 2021 | A Little Mood for Love | 小敏家 | Jin Jiajun | |
| 2021 | The Sweetest Secret | 你是我最甜蜜的心事 | Lin Ran | |
| 2022 | Twenty Your Life On 2 | 二十不惑 | Yin Shang | |
| 2022 | Winter Night | 在你的冬夜里闪耀 | Mu Zixi | |
| 2023 | When I Fly Towards You | 當我飛奔向你 | Zhang Lurang | |
| 2023 | You Are Desire | 白日夢我 | Shen Juan | |
| 2023 | The Legend of Zhuohua | 灼灼風流 | Crown Prince Liu Chen | |
| 2024 | The Land of Warriors | 斗罗大陆之燃魂战 | Tang San | |
| 2025 | Reborn | 焕羽 | Ming Sheng | |
| 2025 | Twelve Letters | 十二封信 | Tang Yixun | |
| 2026 | Generation to Generation | 江湖夜雨十年灯 | Mu Qingyan / Chang Ning | |
| 2026 | Ashes to Crown | 翘楚 | Xie Yanlai / Fu Jiu | |

== Awards and nominations ==
| Year | Award ceremony | Category | Work | Result | Ref. |
|---|---|---|---|---|---|
| 2022 | Weibo Awards | Weibo Annual Works | A Little Mood for Love | Nominated | |
| 2022 | Weibo Awards | Weibo Annual Works | The Bond | Nominated | |
| 2022 | Esquire Gentle Gala | Newcomer of the year | —N/a | Won | |
| 2023 | Youku Awards | Breakout Actor of the Year | A Little Mood for Love | Won | |
| 2023 | The 3rd New Era International TV Festival | Best New Actor | A Little Mood for Love | Won | |
| 2023 | Weibo Awards | Weibo New Actor of the Year | A Little Mood for Love | Won | |
| 2025 | Weibo Cultural Exchange | | —N/a | Won | |
