= My Blue Summer =

- Official movie poster
- Traditional Chinese: 暗戀橘生淮南
- Simplified Chinese: 暗恋橘生淮南
- Literal meaning: Secret Love · Ju Sheng Huainan
- Hanyu Pinyin: Ànliàn Jú Shēng Huáinán
- Directed by: Huang Bin
- Written by: Liu Wanhui (Bayue Chang'an)
- Based on: Unrequited Love (暗戀·橘生淮南) by BaYue Chang An (八月長安)
- Produced by: Xu Jianhai; Rongrong; Feng Xinyue
- Starring: Xin Yunlai; Sophie Zhang
- Edited by: Zhu Lin; Li Yakun
- Music by: Chen Jianqi; Luo Enni
- Production companies: China Film Co., Ltd. Shanghai Weimao Film and Television Culture Co., Ltd.
- Distributed by: China Film Co., Ltd.
- Release date: June 2, 2022 (Mainland China)
- Running time: 102 minutes
- Country: China
- Language: Chinese Mandarin
- Box office: 134 million yuan

My Blue Summer (Chinese: 暗恋橘生淮南; pinyin: Ànliàn Jú Shēng Huáinán, literally "Secret Love · Ju Sheng Huainan") is a 2022 Chinese youth romantic film directed by Bin Huang, and stars Xin Yunlai as Sheng Huai Nan and Sophie Zhang as Luo Zhi. The film was released in mainland China on June 2, 2022.

This film is an adaptation of the novel Unrequited Love by Bayue Chang'an. It tells the story of Luo Zhi and Sheng Huainan's childhood encounter, the silent competition in his youth, the unexpected reunion of college, and Luo Zhi's love for Sheng Huainan buried in his heart for more than ten years.

== Plot ==
Dongshan county, Fujian province, southern China, April 2018. While on a business trip, hotshot lawyer Luo Zhi (Sophie Zhang) hears of the death of well-known Japanese anime director Takahata Isao, who made one of her favourite films, Only Yesterday (1991). At an exhibition in his honour, she sees an old diary that she wrote in her teens (but lost at high school) devoted to her secret crush on a fellow pupil, Sheng Huainan (Xin Yun Lai). She asks if she can reclaim it, as it details a tale of unrequited love that began in her childhood.

In 1998, when Luo Zhi was eight, her father had died in an accident at the factory where he worked. Soon afterwards she had met Sheng Huainan, the young son of the factory’s owner whom her mother was still harassing for more compensation money, claiming the workers were not properly insured. Luo Zhi had been entranced by the handsome Sheng Huainan, who was friendly towards her, but when her mother had seen them together she had dragged Luo Zhi away. Ten years later, in 2008, Luo Zhi was in her second year at Zhenhua Senior High and was the top pupil. But she’d been knocked off the top spot by the sudden arrival of a brilliant transfer student from a wealthy family, Sheng Huainan– which enraged Luo Zhi’s mother, who was still fighting for compensation from the Sheng family. When Luo Zhi had seen Sheng Huainan, she’d been immediately won over again by his humility and quietness, and started secretly following him around and imitating him.

She had left a chalk message (a quote from Only Yesterday) on a wall and he, not knowing who left it, had written a reply. Meanwhile, the school beauty, Ye Zhanyan (Li Ximeng), had made an open play for Sheng Huainan. One day, Luo Zhi’s best friend, Zheng Wenrui (Lamuyangzi), had publicly confessed her love for Sheng Huainan, just to get it off her chest; she later urged Luo Zhi to let Sheng Huainan know her feelings. Then Ye Zhanyan had stolen Luo Zhi’s private diary, and soon afterwards she and Sheng Huainan had become a couple. As the countdown to the university entrance exam [gaokao] began, Luo Zhi had become the school’s top pupil, while Sheng Huainan slipped down to 24th. It was rumoured that he and Ye Zhanyan were going to travel abroad instead of sitting the exam.

By 2012, Luo Zhi was at university in Xiamen, studying Law. Then one day she’d run into Sheng Huainan, who was acting in an arty “historical sci-fi” student film, Endless Love 末日之恋, directed by film club head Zhang Minrui (Wu Jiacheng). She had pretended to only vaguely remember him, and he had told her that he’d broken up with Ye Zhanyan. She ended up co-starring with him in the student film, and a cautious friendship-cum-romance had started to grow between them. He had said he was still looking for whoever wrote the line from his favorite film, Only Yesterday. The two gradually got to know each other and got closer and closer, but they did not dare to express their hearts. When the pressure of growth and reality comes one after another, how to put this long secret love.

== Cast ==
Actor	Character	Information	Notes
Sophie Zhang	Luo Zhi	She is one of the main cast in the movie. She and Sheng Huainan met at a wedding when they were young. After entering Zhenhua High School together, she secretly fell in love with him until college. By chance, she summoned courage and tried her best to approach him. She is cold and lonely, has a high EQ, and is good at disguising her thoughts in front of Sheng Huainan. She is kind in appearance, and her joy and anger are not invisible.	Zhang Xiran, young Luo Zhi
Xin Yunlai	Sheng Huai Nan	The sunny boy, with a handsome face and excellent grades, ranked first in the science class in high school. With determination and insight, he can easily see through the mentality and vanity of his classmates around him and the girl's admiration for him. His smile is always meaningful, and he tries to respond respectfully to the girls that confess to him. However, this "consideration" has brought him a lot of misunderstandings, and his old friend gives him the nickname "Lao Shen", literally means Old Shen.	Lester Lin, young Huainan
Wu Jiacheng	Zhang Ming Rui	He is Sheng Huainan's college roommate and friend. He is an adorable boy with a clean side face, simple and uninventive, and he smiles warmly. He was a frustrated director and led the Film Club at the University.	
Jackie Li	Zheng Wenrui	She is Luo Zhi's classmate. In their last year of high school, she confessed her love for Sheng Huainan during their theater performance.	
Li Ximeng	Ye Zhanyan	She is Sheng Huainan's ex-girlfriend. She is good at singing, pretty, and intelligent. In their last year of high school, she took Luo Zhi's diary and pretended to be the girl Sheng Huainan had been looking.	

== Soundtrack ==
No.	Title	Lyrics	Music	Performer	Length
1.	"Secret Love (暗恋)"	Jin Can	Qian Lei	Jane Zhang	4:23
2.	"Before Tears Fall Down (眼泪落下之前)"	Li Xueqin, Wang Sulong	Wang Sulong	Silence Wang	4:22
3.	"Our Secret Love (暗恋的我们)"	Sun Yi, Yang Jionghan	Yang Jionghan	Yang Jionghan	3:44
Total length:					12:29

== Production and distribution ==
In September 2019, Weifeng Entertainment Media revealed that it would produce a film version of Chang'an's novel "Secret Love · Ju Sheng Huainan" in August, tentatively titled Secret Love.

On July 9, 2021, the film released its theatrical trailer. On December 2, the film released the final trailer and the final poster, announcing that it would be released on May 20, 2022. On December 31, the film released the New Year's Eve invitation trailer and poster.

On January 14, 2022, the film released a special poster for Valentine's Day in the diary. In February 14, the film released two single posters and a double poster. On March 14, the film released a special poster for the festival. On April 1, the film released "Follow Behind You" "30-second trailer and "rainy day" poster. On April 6, the film released the theme song "Secret Love" poster. On April 7, the film released the theme song MV of the same name and the theme song "Secret Love" MV sung by Zhang Liangying. On April 14, the film was released Character poster. On May 6, the film released the "Youth Without Regret" group portrait trailer and double poster. On May 15, the film announced the cancellation of its release plan on May 20. On May 25, the film announced on the official Weibo that it would be rescheduled on June 2, and Released a new poster. On the same day, the film released the MV and poster of the third anniversary graduation season agreed song "暗恋的我们" literally, "We Who's Secretly In Love" composed by Yang Jionghan. On May 30, the film released a warm-up poster for the music video of "Before Tears Fall". On June 2, the film released its main Teaser and Poster. On June 3, the film released the "Secret Love" version of the poster. On June 5 to 8, the film released movie clips. The next day, the film released a behind-the-scene clips. In June 10, the film released the graduation season MV and poster of "I'll wait for you after the college entrance examination". on June 14, the film released clips and stills, and on June 30, the film announced that the release extension until July 31.

On November 25, 2022, This Film Distributed by Clover Films (Singapore Based Film Distribution) and M Pictures Cambodia (Localized Distribution) for Theatrical Release, But Only Khmer Audio.

== Box office record ==
Date (+8:00	Time (UTC +8 CST)	Cumulative box office (in RMB)	Notes	Ref(s)
June 1, 2022	10:45	1.26 million yuan	Pre-sale	
June 3, 2022		19.96 million yuan		
June 4, 2022	13:51	20 million yuan	Including pre-sale	
June 4, 2022		253,900 yuan		
June 5, 2022	21:00	47,87,900 yuan		
June 13, 2022	10:54	100 million yuan		

== Awards and nominations ==
Year	Award	Category	Recipient	Result	Ref(s)
2022	The 17th China Changchun Film Festival	Golden Deer Award	My Blue Summer	Won	
