= Lei Jia =

Chinese folk soprano

Lei Jia 雷佳
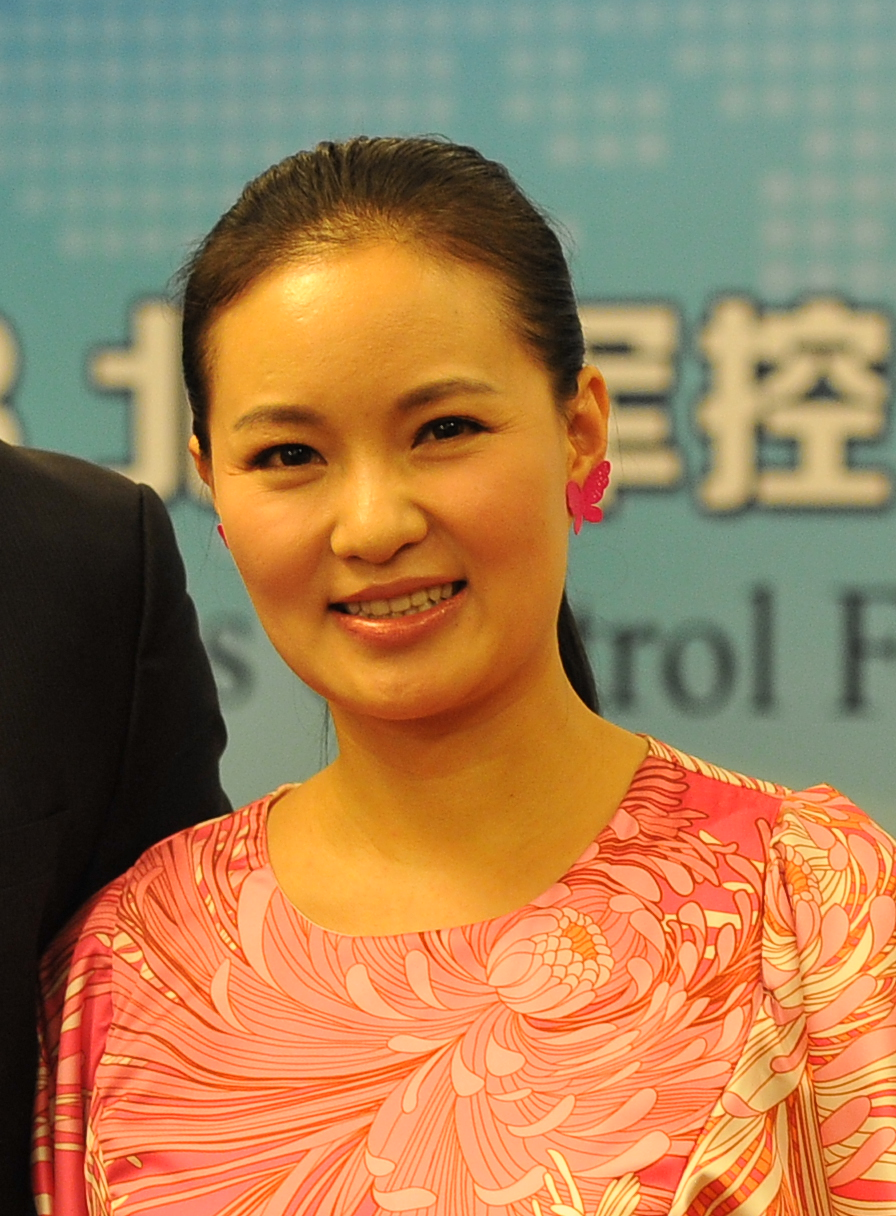
- Lei in 2013

Background information
- Born: Lei Jia; October 19, 1979 (age 46); Yiyang, Hunan, China
- Genres: Chinese folk soprano
- Years active: 1997–present
- Website: Official website

Lei Jia (Chinese: 雷佳; pinyin: Léi Jīa, born 19 October 1979) is a Chinese folk soprano and a Chinese national class one performer.

== Biography ==
Lei was born in Yiyang, Hunan province in 1979. She graduated from the drama department of Hunan Vocational College of Art in 1997 specializing in Huaguxi. In 2002, she graduated from the China Conservatory of Music with a Bachelor of Arts degree in vocal performance. She then joined the Song and Dance Troupe of the General Political Department (GPD) of the Chinese People's Liberation Army (PLA) as a soprano soloist. Lei Jia also completed her postgraduate program in art management from the Peking University in 2006, and vocal performance postgraduate program of the People's Liberation Army Art Institute in 2009.

Lei Jia has won many awards in national vocal competitions including first place in the 2003 “Jin Zhong Jiang”, a prestigious award for the musical professionals in China. In 2004, she won first place professional folk soloist in the 11th National Youth TV singing competition. She was awarded one of the top 10 new singers in 2005 by CCTV. In 2008, Lei Jia was awarded best female folk singer in the 9th CCTV-MTV music fest.

Lei Jia has visited over twenty countries to participate in various cultural exchange activities and help introducing Chinese folk music to the world. In the prelude leading to the 2008 Beijing Summer Olympics, Lei Jia participated in "The Songs of the 56 Chinese Nationalities Music Torch Relay". This was a unique project that included a compilation of fifty-six folk songs from the fifty-six ethnic groups of China. Lei Jia was given the role of lead singer in this event. At the 2008 Summer Olympics closing ceremony in Beijing, Lei Jia performed a Chinese folk song, "The Moon is Bright Tonight", along with six other female vocalists. In late 2008, Lei Jia was invited as a special guest to perform in the recital concert of Wang Hongwei, a well-known Chinese folk tenor, at the famous Golden Hall of the Musikverein in Vienna, Austria. On 1 October 2009 at Tiananmen Square in Beijing, Lei Jia and Dai Yuqiang sang during the grand parade celebrating the 60th anniversary of the People's Republic of China.

== Personal life ==
Lei is married to Chen Zhengbai (陈正拜) who is an engineer and business entrepreneur.

== Discography ==
- The Songs of the 56 Chinese Nationalities, 中华五十六民族之歌
- Dandelion Sky, 蒲公英的天空
- Reed Catkins, 芦花
- Lei Jia – from the series of Contemporary Chinese Youth Singers, 雷佳-中国当代青年歌唱家系列
