= Zhang Miaoyi =

Chinese actress

- Born: Zhang Miaoyi; 13 September 1998 (age 27); Pinghu, Zhejiang, China
- Education: Shanghai Institute of Visual Art
- Occupation: Actress
- Years active: 2021–present
- Agent(s): Xingyu Culture; Zhang Miaoyi Studio

Chinese name
- Traditional Chinese: 張淼怡
- Simplified Chinese: 张淼怡
Transcriptions
Standard Mandarin
- Hanyu Pinyin: Zhāng Miǎoyí

Zhang Miaoyi (Chinese: 张淼怡; pinyin: Zhāng Miǎoyí; born 13 September 1998) is a Chinese actress. She is best known for her role in the television series When I Fly Towards You (2023), which gave her international recognition.

== Early life ==
Zhang Miaoyi was born in Pinghu, Zhejiang, China, on September 13, 1998. In the sixth grade of primary school, Zhang went to Beijing to go to high school. In 2017, after graduating from high school, she was admitted to the performance major of Shanghai Institute of Visual Arts.

== Filmography ==
=== Film ===
Year	English title	Chinese title	Role	Ref.
2024	The Dream of the Red Chamber	红楼梦之金玉良缘	Lin Daiyu	

=== Television series ===
Year	Title		Role	Notes	Ref.
Year	English	Original	Role	Notes	Ref.
2021	Crossroad Bistro	北辙南辕	Drama actress		
2021	Out of the Dream	梦见狮子	Meng Ru Shen Ji		
2021	Marvelous Women	当家主母	Ji Xiang		
2022	Let's Meet Now	见面吧就现在	Fu Tian		
2022–2023	Please Don't Spoil Me	拜托了，别宠我	Yan Yiyi	Season 1–5	
2023	Hi Producer	正好遇见你	Qiu Tai's granddaughter		
2023	When I Fly Towards You	当我飞奔向你	Su Zaizai		
2023	Exclusive Fairytale	独家童话	Xiao Tu		
2023	Back to Seventeen	我回到十七岁的理由	Zhong Xiaoxiao		
2024	Sweet Trap	我回到十七岁的理由	Li Nai		
2024	The Substitute Princess's Love	偷得将军半日闲	Shen Keyi		
2024	Practice Daughter	南玉卿心	Mei Yushan		
2024	Fangs of Fortune	大梦归离	E Shou	Cameo (Ep. 1)	
2024	Guardians of the Dafeng	大奉打更人	Xu Lingyue		
2025	The First Frost	难哄	Zhong Siqiao		
2025	Legend of the Female General	锦月如歌	Song Taotao		
2025	The Company	哑舍	Miao Tong		
TBA	Romance Next Door	兄友妹恭	Cheng Lele		
TBA	Liao Zhai	聊斋	Xi Yue		
TBA	The Warmth in the Dark	黎明前他会归来	Bei Yao		
TBA	Cuo Shi Lu	错世录	Cui Xiaoxiao		

== Awards and nominations ==
Year	Award ceremony	Category	Result	Ref.
2023	9th Wenrong Award for Potential	Young Actor of the Year	Won	
