= Ren Min =

Chinese actress (born 1999)

- Born: December 17, 1999 (age 26); Hunan, China
- Education: Central Academy of Drama
- Occupation: Actress
- Years active: 2018–present
- Agent: Enlight Media
- Height: 168 cm (5 ft 6 in)

Chinese name
- Simplified Chinese: 任敏
- Hanyu Pinyin: Rèn Mǐn

Ren Min (Chinese: 任敏, born December 17, 1999) is a Chinese actress. She first gained recognition for the film Cry Me a Sad River (2018). Ren is best known for her roles in the television series Serenade of Peaceful Joy (2020), The Longest Promise (2023), and The Rise of Ning (2024).

== Filmography ==
=== Films ===
| Year | Title | Role | Ref. |
|---|---|---|---|
| 2018 | Cry Me a Sad River | Yi Yao | |
| 2022 | Ten Years of Loving You | Wen Heng | |
| 2022 | Stay With Me | Zhao Yiyi | |
| 2024 | 749 Bureau | Yan Yan | |

=== Television series ===
| Year | Title | Role | Notes | Ref. |
|---|---|---|---|---|
| 2020 | Serenade of Peaceful Joy | Zhao Huirou / Princess Fu Kang | | |
| 2020 | Heroes in Harm's Way | Yu Lina | | |
| 2021 | To Be a Better Girl | Ruan Meng | | |
| 2022 | Never Grow Old | Tan Xin | | |
| 2023 | Ray of Night | Ren Zhen | | |
| 2023 | The Longest Promise | Zhu Yan | | |
| 2023 | Fearless Blood | Yin Zhi | | |
| 2023 | The Lonely Warrior | Wang Miaomiao | | |
| 2024 | White Cat Legend | Shangguan Qin | Cameo | |
| 2024 | Five King's of Thieves | Shui Yao'er | | |
| 2024 | Shooting Stars | Luo Minmin | | |
| 2024 | The Rise of Ning | Luo Yining | | |
| 2026 | Hold a Court Now | Qin Rui | | |
| 2026 | Light to the Night | He Xiaohe | | |
| 2026 | A Splendid Match | Gu Jinzhao | | |
| TBA | Winds Beyond the Wall | TBA | | |

== Awards and nominations ==
| Year | Award ceremony | Category | Nominee / Work | Result |
|---|---|---|---|---|
| 2020 | 12th China TV Drama Awards | Most Promising Actress of the Year | Serenade of Peaceful Joy | Won |
| 2020 | Douyin Star Motion Night | Leaping Actor of the Year | Ren Min | Won |
| 2024 | Tencent Video Star Awards | Breakthrough Television Actor of the Year | Ren Min | Won |
| 2024 | Weibo TV & Internet Video Summit | Breakthrough Actor of the Year | Ren Min | Won |
