= Evrim Ağacı =

Turkish website

Evrim Ağacı is a Turkish website that was founded in 2010. Based in Ankara, Turkey, it aims to promote science to the Turkish audience.
