= Beijing Enlight Media =

Chinese media company

- logo of the official website "Ewang.com"
- Native name: 北京光线传媒股份有限公司
- Type: Public
- Traded as: SZSE: 300251; SZSE 200 Component
- Founded: 24 April 2000; 26 years ago
- Headquarters: Beijing, China
- Key people: Wang Changtian (Chairman & GM); Li Xiaoping (Deputy GM); Li Delai (Deputy GM)
- Brands: ewang.com (Chinese: E视网)
- Revenue: ▲CN¥1.523 billion (2015)
- Operating income: ▲CN¥433.3 million (2015)
- Net income: ▲CN¥402.1 million (2015)
- Total assets: ▲CN¥8.189 billion (2015)
- Total equity: ▲CN¥6.872 billion (2015)
- Owner: Wang family (56.45%); Ali Venture Capital (8.78%); Li Xiaoping (3.79%); Li Delai (3.23%); others (27.75%)
- Parent: Enlight Investment Holding
- Subsidiaries: Beijing Enlight Pictures (100%)
- Footnotes in a consolidated basis

Beijing Enlight Media
- Simplified Chinese: 北京光线传媒
- Traditional Chinese: 北京光線傳媒
Transcriptions

Beijing Enlight Media Co., Ltd. known as Enlight Media is a Chinese publicly traded company. It is a TV program production enterprise, as well as film production via Beijing Enlight Pictures. The company was incorporated on 24 April 2000.

Beijing Enlight Media was a constituent of Shenzhen Stock Exchange blue-chip index SZSE 100 Index, but removed on 12 June 2017 (effective on the first trading day of July). As of 4 July 2017, Beijing Enlight Media is a constituent of SZSE 200 Index (mid cap index).

== Artists ==
- Liu Yan
- Sun Qian
- Ren Min
- Ding Yuxi
- Zhang Ruonan
- Xin Yunlai
- Qi Yuchen
- Wu Jun Ting
- Li Xiao Qian
- Zhu Dan Ni
- Ding Guan Sen
- Sun Mei Lin

== Shareholders ==
As of 31 December 2015, Wang Changtian (Chinese: 王长田), chairman of Enlight Media, via Shanghai Enlight Investment Holding (Chinese: 上海光线投资控股), owned 50.06% shares of Enlight Media as the largest shareholder; the second largest shareholder of Enlight Media was Ali Venture Capital (Chinese: 阿里创业投资), (Note: The stake of the company was 80% owned by Jack Ma, but also pledged to Alibaba Group. It was considered as a subsidiary and/or consolidated entity of Alibaba Group.) The third largest shareholder (for 3.87%), Du Yinglian (Chinese: 杜英莲), was in fact Wang's wife. The sixth (1.37%) and seventh (1.15%) largest shareholder, were younger brother and sister of Wang Changtian. Deputy general managers (and directors), Li Xiaoping (Chinese: 李晓萍) and Li Delai (Chinese: 李德来) owned 3.79% and 3.23% shares respectively as the fourth and fifth largest shareholder.

Other shareholders in the top 10 were National Social Security Fund (0.28%), an index-tracking fund of China Construction Bank (0.21%) and Everbright Securities (0.21%).
