= Yan Zidong =

Chinese actor and singer (born 1994)

- Born: December 10, 1994 (age 31); Shenyang, Liaoning, China
- Other name: Kevin Yan
- Education: Shanghai Normal University
- Occupations: Actor, singer
- Years active: 2016–present
- Agent: Century Agency (2016-18)
- Height: 6 ft 0 in (1.83 m)

Chinese name
- Traditional Chinese: 晏紫東
- Simplified Chinese: 晏紫东
Transcriptions

Yan Zidong (Chinese: 晏紫东; born 10 December 1994), also known as Kevin Yan, is a Chinese actor and singer. He is best known for his roles in the dramas Love is More Than a Word (2016), Till Death Tear Us Apart (2017), Butterfly Lovers (2017), and Guardians of the Dafeng (2024).

== Early life and education ==
Yan was born on 10 December 1994 in Shenyang, Liaoning, China. He enrolled in Xie Jin Film & Television Art College of Shanghai Normal University in 2012, and graduated in 2016.

== Career ==
In 2013, Yang starred in the micro film Return; the film is also his majoring in college graduation work. After graduating from university in 2016, he signed with Century Agency, a brokerage company and officially entered the entertainment industry.

Yan officially debuted as an actor in 2016 with the drama Love Is More Than A Word, playing Gu She. Thereafter, he became known to the audience. In 2017, he started to gain increased attention and popularity with his role as Zhou Yaohua in historical drama Till Death Tear Us Apart, based on the BL novel Love in a Blaze / A Lifetime Love by Nan Zhi. The same year, he played Bujantai in historical drama Rule the World and starred in the wuxia comedy drama Legend of the Little Monk 2, playing a supporting role. He then starred as the male lead in historical drama Butterfly Lovers, and received positive reviews for his portrayal of Liang Shanbo.

On February 24, 2018, Yan himself issued a statement via Sina Weibo saying that he had cancelled the contract with the original brokerage company Century Agency. In 2019, he starred in the romance drama Meet in Gourmet Food, as well as action crime series The World is Not Fraudulent. Yan also starred in the historical drama Psychic Princess, and youth romance film Miss Forever.

Yan has been cast in the historical dramas Renascence, and Court Lady. He also starred in the 2020 urban romance drama Nothing But Thirty playing a guitarist. Yan also played the role of a sharp-tongued scholar Xu Xinnian in the 2024 period fantasy drama Guardians of the Dafeng.

== Filmography ==
=== Film ===
Year	English title	Chinese title	Role	Notes
2019	Miss Forever	一生有你	Meng Yifei	

=== Television series ===
Year	English title	Chinese title	Role	Notes
2016	Love is More Than a Word	識汝不識丁	Gu She	
2017	Till Death Tear Us Apart	愉此一生	Zhou Yaohua	
2017	Rule the World	独步天下	Bujantai	
2017	Legend of the Little Monk 2	降龙伏虎小济公2	Li Fengchun	
2017	Butterfly Lovers	梁山伯与祝英台	Liang Shanbo	
2017	A Chinese Odyssey: Love of Eternity	大话西游之爱你一万年	Xu Tianqian	
2019	Meet in Gourmet Food	食分喜歡你	Zuo Yi	
2019	The World is Not Fraudulent	天下无诈	Tian He	
2019	Psychic Princess	通灵妃	Prince Ye	
2020	Renascence	凤唳九天	Han Jinyi	
2020	Nothing But Thirty	三十而已	Zhong Xiaoyang	
2021	Ode to Daughter of Great Tang	大唐女儿行		
2024	Guardians of the Dafeng	大奉打更人	Xu Xinnian	

== Discography ==
Year	English title	Chinese title	Album	Notes
2016	"Blooming Youth"	花开年少	Love is More Than a Word OST	
2016	"Only This Life"	愉此一生	Till Death Tear Us Apart OST	
2017	"Thoughts Flying"	思念飞花	Till Death Tear Us Apart OST	
2017	"Entire City Scattered with Flowers"	满城飞花	Butterfly Lovers OST	
2017	"Eighteen Farewell"	十八相送	Butterfly Lovers OST	
2017	"Meow Alien and Bear Child"	喵星人和熊孩子		
2019	"Miss Forever"	一生有你	Miss Forever OST	
