= Perfect Match: A Trip of Friendship =

- Chinese: 友福同享; pinyin: Yǒufú Tóngxiǎng
- Genre: Reality television
- Country of origin: China
- Original language: Mandarin
- No. of seasons: 1
- No. of episodes: 7 (6 on Netflix)

Original release
- Network: Mango TV
- Release: January 29, 2025

Related
- Perfect Match

Perfect Match: A Trip of Friendship (Chinese: 友福同享; pinyin: Yǒufú Tóngxiǎng) is a 2025 Chinese reality variety show produced by Mango TV. Serving as the official companion spin-off variety program for the historical drama series Perfect Match (also known as Five Blessings), the show features cast members reuniting for games, team-building activities, and challenges in an ancient town setting.

== Cast ==
- Lu Yuxiao
- Wang Xingyue
- Liu Xiening
- Chen Heyi
- Wu Xuanyi
- Huang Shengchi
- Huangyang Tiantian
- Dong Sicheng
- Zhao Qing
- Ke Ying (Episode 7 only)
- Liang Yongqi (Episode 7 only)

== Episodes ==
No.	Title	Original release date
1	""Episode 1""	March 5, 2025
The cast reunites via awning boats in Lili Ancient Town, where Zhao Qing welcomes them as their tour guide. After competing in a tea-themed calling game using their character names, the winning team secures a boat ride to lunch while the losers must navigate on foot to reach the restaurant.
2	""Episode 2""	March 6, 2025
After completing a dish-guessing lunch game, the cast arrives at the guesthouse to compete for room privileges. In a race to retrieve and hide hidden luggage across Lili, indoor team games unlock location clues while runners scour the alleys and canals to secure their bags before room selection.
3	""Episode 3""	March 7, 2025
The cast plays an anonymous confession-guessing game to win next-day VIP privileges, uncovering childhood talents, numerous secrets, and amusing quirks. Before Huangyang Tiantian departs to fulfill another shooting schedule, the members exchange farewell gifts, concluding with mock wedding ring-wearing ceremonies between the on-screen drama couples.
4	""Episode 4""	March 12, 2025
Huang Shengchi enjoys his VIP breakfast and perks, choosing Wu Xuanyi to join him while lending their convertible ride to the other members. Later, the cast splits into "cats" and "mice" for two high-energy games of hide-and-seek across the campsite and surrounding park trails using bicycles and tagged stickers.
5	""Episode 5""	March 13, 2025
The hide-and-seek match concludes as the final members are tracked down, earning the winning team a barbecue feast while Wang Xingyue and Lu Yuxiao take a scenic motorcycle cruise by the lake. After evening fireworks and behind-the-scenes drama, the cast plays a synchronized pose game the following day to board a luxury yacht cruise in Wujiang.
6	""Episode 6""	March 14, 2025
To earn the shopkeeper title for an expansion branch, the members compete in Wujiang dialect listening tests, traditional steelyard scale weighing, and a bamboo-basket feather-catching challenge. In the evening, the cast reads handwritten letters and shares emotional reflections on their bond during filming, highlighted by Lu Yuxiao's heartfelt confession to each co-star.
7	""Episode 7""	March 19, 2025
In this standalone bonus episode, exclusive to YouTube and not included in the Netflix release, co-stars Ke Ying and Liang Yongqi make their sole appearance in the variety series. The pair strolls through Lili Ancient Town sampling local street snacks, reacts to behind-the-scenes clips of the other cast members, and exchanges in-character letters reflecting on their on-screen romance.

== Release ==
The series premiered on Mango TV in March 2025 and was subsequently released internationally on Netflix.
