= List of Chinese actresses =

The following is a list of notable actresses from mainland China.

== A ==
- Aliya
- An Yuexi
- Angelababy

== B ==
- Bai Bingke
- Bai Lu
- Bao Shangen

== C ==
- Chen Duling
- Chen Hao
- Chen Hong
- Joan Chen
- Chen Sisi
- Chen Xiaoxu
- Chen Yumei
- Chen Yunshang
- Chen Yuqi
- Cheng Xiao
- Ching Li

== D ==
- Deng Jie
- Deng Enxi
- Dilraba Dilmurat
- Dong Jie
- Dai Luwa

== E ==
- Esther Yu

== F ==
- Fan Bingbing
- Fan Ruijuan
- Fu Yaning

== G ==
- Gao Xiumin
- Gao Yuanyuan
- Gong Beibi
- Gong Li
- Gu Yuezhen
- Guan Xiaotong
- Gulnazar

== H ==
- He Meitian
- He Ruixian
- He Saifei
- Huang Lu
- Huang Shengyi
- Huang Yi
- Huangyang Tiantian

== J ==
- Jia Nai
- Jiang Qinqin
- Jiang Shuying
- Jiang Wenli
- Jiang Xin
- Jing Tian
- Ju Jingyi

== L ==
- Li Bingbing
- Li Landi
- Li Lingyu
- Li Man
- Li Qian
- Li Xiaolu
- Ling Tai
- Leanne Liu
- Liu Shishi
- Liu Tao
- Liu Xiaoqing
- Liu Yan
- Liu Yifei
- Luo Yan
- Lu Yuxiao
- Liu Haocun

== M ==
- Mao Xiaotong
- Meng Meiqi
- Meng Ziyi

== N ==
- Ni Ni
- Ning Jing

== O ==
- Ouyang Nana

== P ==
- Pan Hong
- Peng Xiaoran

== Q ==
- Qu Shanshan
- Qu Ying

== R ==
- Ren Min
- Ren Yexiang
- Ruan Lingyu

== S ==
- Shangguan Yunzhu
- Shen Yue
- Shen Yujie
- Siqin Gaowa
- Snow Kong
- Song Dandan
- Sun Feifei
- Sun Li
- Sun Qian
- Sun Zhenni

== T ==
- Tan Songyun
- Tiffany Tang
- Tang Wei
- Tian Yuan
- Tong Liya
- Tian Xiwei

== V ==
- Victoria Song

== W ==
- Daisy Waite
- Wan Peng
- Wang Renmei
- Wang Yan
- Janice Wu
- Wu Yin
- Wang Churan
- Wang Yinglu

== X ==
- Xing Fei
- Xu Jiao
- Xu Jinglei
- Xu Lu
- Xu Ruohan

== Y ==
- Yan Huizhu
- Yan Ni
- Yang Mi
- Yang Naimei
- Yang Zi
- Ye Qing
- Julie Yeh
- Yu Nan
- Yuan Li
- Yuan Quan
- Yuan Shanshan

== Z ==
- Zhang Jingchu
- Zhang Jingyi
- Zhang Xiaofei
- Zhang Yuqi
- Zhang Yuxi
- Zhang Zifeng
- Zhang Ziyi
- Zhao Lusi
- Zhao Liying
- Zhao Tao
- Zhao Wei
- Zhao Jinmai
- Zanilia Zhao
- Zheng Shuang
- Betty Zhou
- Zhou Xuan
- Zhou Xun
- Zhou Ye
- Zhang Ruonan
- Zhang Miaoyi
- Zhao Qing
