= Summer's Desire =

Summer's Desire may refer to:

- Summer's Desire (novel), 2006–07 Chinese serialized Internet novel by Ming Xiaoxi
- Summer's Desire (2010 TV series), Taiwanese-Chinese TV series based on the novel
- Summer's Desire (film), 2016 Chinese film based on the novel
- Summer's Desire (2018 TV series), Chinese TV series based on the novel
