= Scent of Time =

- Official poster
- 为有暗香来 (Chinese)
- Genre: Historical; Romance; Fantasy
- Based on: Xi Qian Hua (洗铅华) by Qi Yue Li
- Written by: Ren Ya Nan
- Directed by: Bai Yun Mo; Guo Hao
- Starring: Zhou Ye; Wang Xingyue; Peng Chu Yue; Zhang Yi Jie; Zhao Qing
- Country of origin: China
- Original language: Mandarin
- No. of seasons: 1
- No. of episodes: 30

Production
- Executive producers: Liu Yan Hong; Ma Tian; Zhou Jing
- Producers: Yu Zheng; Jin Chuan; Yang Le; Luo Pan
- Running time: 45 minutes
- Production company: Huanyu Film

Original release
- Network: Youku
- Release: October 13 – November 1, 2023

Scent of Time (Chinese: 为有暗香来; pinyin: Wèi Yǒu Àn Xiang Lái) is a 2023 Chinese historical romance fantasy drama series starring Zhou Ye, Wang Xingyue, Peng Chu Yue, Zhang Yi Jie, and Zhao Qing. Produced by Huanyu Film, the series is adapted from the web novel Xi Qian Hua (洗铅华) by Qi Yue Li (七月荔). It premiered on Youku on October 13, 2023.

== Synopsis ==
The story follows Hua Qian (played by Zhou Ye), the daughter of a prominent herbal medicine family. Driven by an intense infatuation with Zhong Yelan (Peng Chu Yue), a man who does not reciprocate her feelings, Hua Qian makes a series of grave mistakes that ultimately lead to the downfall of her family. In a twist of fate, Hua Qian awakens to find herself back on the night of her wedding with Zhong Yelan, reliving the past.

Having experienced the devastating consequences of her previous actions, Hua Qian is determined to rectify her past errors. This time, she prioritizes her family and friends, choosing to support the burgeoning love between Zhong Yelan and Mu Yao (Zhao Qing) rather than pursuing her own unrequited desires. As she navigates this new path, past mysteries gradually come to light. She also begins to notice the quiet protection offered by Zhong Xiwu (Wang Xingyue) and the unwavering dedication of Hua Rongzhou (Zhang Yi Jie) to her safety. The series explores themes of redemption, self-discovery, and the true meaning of love and family.

== Cast ==
=== Main ===
- Zhou Ye as Hua Qian
- Wang Xingyue as Zhong Xiwu
- Peng Chu Yue as Zhong Yelan
- Zhang Yi Jie as Hua Rongzhou
- Zhao Qing as Mu Yao

=== Supporting ===
- Xu Fan as Elder Princess
- Chen Zihan as Su Wu Niang
- Guo Dong Hai as Gao Yu
- Hu Bo Wen as Chen Yuan
- Sun Rui as Lin Jiang
- Sun Ao as Nan Feng
- Chen Hao Wen as Ji Dong
- Luo Rui as Cui Zhu
- Wang Ruo Xi as Ban Xia
- Zhu Ya Ting as Yin Xing
- Zhang Lei as Hua Wenang
- Liu Min as Madame Hua
- Xiang Xia as Hua Shen
- Ai Mi as Qian Zhi
- Qian Jie as Mother Li
- Yin Yi Bo as Da Huang
- Yang Fu Yu as Hua Man
- Zhang Zi Lin as Yu Zhu
- Zhang Fan as Mu Yunping
- Hu Qian Qian as Ling Long

== Production ==
The series was produced by Huanyu Film, with Yu Zheng serving as one of the primary producers. Filming took place from December 19, 2021, to March 11, 2022. The production design and costumes were noted for their adherence to traditional Chinese aesthetics, particularly in the representation of historical herbal medicine culture and attire. The series achieved significant popularity on the Youku platform, reaching a popularity index of over 10,000 within days of its premiere.

== Aesthetics and Heritage ==
The visual style of Scent of Time is heavily influenced by traditional Chinese craftsmanship, specifically focusing on the aesthetics of the Hanfu movement and historical accessories. The series has sparked renewed interest in traditional items such as Ronghua velvet flowers and solid perfume balms, which were meticulously recreated for the production to reflect Ming Dynasty aesthetics.

== Reception ==
Scent of Time received generally positive reviews for its fast-paced narrative and unique take on the "redemption" trope in historical dramas. The series gained significant international attention, maintaining high ratings on global entertainment databases such as IMDb. Critics praised the performances of the lead cast, particularly Zhou Ye and Wang Xingyue, for their nuanced portrayals. The series was also noted for its successful international distribution on platforms like HBO Max (branded as HBO Go in Southeast Asia).
