= Talking to Hollywood with Betty Zhou =

- Genre: Talk show
- Created by: Betty Zhou, Rob Moore
- Presented by: Betty Zhou
- Country of origin: United States; China
- Original languages: Chinese; English
- No. of seasons: 2

Production
- Executive producer: Betty Zhou
- Production location: Hollywood
- Production company: CCTV

Original release
- Release: 2015 – present

Talking to Hollywood with Betty Zhou is a talk show focused on major American movies that are scheduled for cinematic release in China. Hosted by Betty Zhou, the show connects Chinese audiences with behind-the-scenes exclusives of some of Hollywood's biggest stars and blockbuster productions. The show airs on CCTV.

It was co-created by Rob Moore and produced with the support of Paramount Pictures, Walt Disney Studios, Universal Studios, and Sony Pictures Entertainment. The show gives Chinese audiences an exclusive and intimate look into the world's largest entertainment industry by interviewing some of Hollywood's biggest movie stars such as Arnold Schwarzenegger, Tom Cruise, Chris Pratt, Vin Diesel, Jennifer Lawrence, Adam Sandler and Zoe Saldaña.
