= Chen Yongkang =

The name Chen Yongkang (陈永康; 陳永康) may refer to:

- Chen Yongkang, a character in Chinese streaming television series Delicacies Destiny
- Chen Yeong-kang (born 1951), an Admiral of the Republic of China
