= Feud (Chinese TV series) =

2025 Chinese television series

- Promotional poster
- Also known as: Lament of the River Immortal
- Genre: Xianxia; Romance
- Written by: Zhao Na; Ren Yanan
- Directed by: Zhi Lei; Guo Hao
- Starring: Bai Lu; Zeng Shunxi
- Country of origin: China
- Original language: Mandarin
- No. of seasons: 1
- No. of episodes: 32

Production
- Executive producer: Li Xiuzhen
- Producer: Yu Zheng
- Production location: Hengdian World Studios
- Running time: 45 minutes
- Production companies: iQIYI; Huanyu Film

Original release
- Network: iQIYI
- Release: June 6 – June 22, 2025

Feud (Chinese: 临江仙) is a 2025 Chinese television series starring Bai Lu and Zeng Shunxi in lead roles. The series aired from June 6, 2025 to June 22, 2025 on iQIYI. It is also available for streaming on Rakuten Viki and Line TV in selected regions.

The popularity heat index exceeded 10,000 on iQIYI. The series has a 6.0 rating on Douban from over 121,422 users.

== Synopsis ==
When the primordial god created the world, Hua Ruyue and Bai Jiusi were formed from the vital energy of his divine grace. Over thousands of years, they became rivals until Bai Jiusi proposed that they undergo a love tribulation in the mortal realm. However, differing views and a misunderstanding led him to seal Hua Ruyue's powers, forcing her to live in the mortal realm for ten years. After returning, Hua Ruyue sealed Bai Jiusi and caused chaos in the Nine Heavens. When Bai Jiusi later broke free and attempted to confront her, Hua Ruyue ultimately self-destructed out of hatred for him.

Four hundred years later, Li Qingyue, a disciple of the Jingyun Sect with limited spiritual power, becomes involved with Bai Jiusi, and marries him. After entering the Heavenly Realm, she faces repeated threats to her life and learns about Hua Ruyue, Bai Jiusi's first wife, who shared an identical appearance with her. Her resemblance to Hua Ruyue creates tension, as Bai Jiusi suspects she may in fact be Hua Ruyue and repeatedly tests her identity.

== Cast and characters ==
=== Main cast ===
- Bai Lu as Li Qingyue / Hua Ruyue

Li Qingyue: A disciple of the Jingyun Sect with limited spiritual power. After marrying Bai Jiusi, she enters the Nine Heavens, where she faces constant threats to her life and increasing doubts surrounding her true identity.
Hua Ruyue: The Divine Lord Siling of the Nine Heavens and one of two powerful beings created from the primordial god's divine grace. After Bai Jiusi sealed her powers and left her in the mortal realm, she endured numerous hardships over ten years, which fostered deep resentment toward him. Upon returning to the Nine Heavens, she sealed Bai Jiusi and caused chaos before ultimately self-destructing out of grief and hatred.

- Zeng Shunxi as Bai Jiusi

The Heavenly Lord Dacheng of the Nine Heavens and one of the two powerful beings created from the primordial god's divine grace. In the past, a misunderstanding led him to seal Hua Ruyue's powers and confine her to the mortal realm for ten years. Four hundred years after her self-destruction, he encounters Li Qingyue, a woman who resembles Hua Ruyue exactly, and comes to suspect that she may be Hua Ruyue in disguise.

=== Supporting cast ===
- He Ruixian as Fang Ling'er
- Chen Xinhai as Zhang Suan
- Zhao Yiqin as Meng Changqin / Meng Qi / Meng Chi
- Zhou Jieqiong as Qu Xingman
- Liang Yongqi as Li Mo
- Zhao Zhaoyi as Lv Suguan
- Zheng Kai as Meng Chu
- Hong Yao as Xiao Jingshan
- Yu Rongguang as Xuan Wei
- Huang Yi as Qing Yang
- Andrew Lien as Zi Yang
- Zhang Baiqiao as Fan Jiaojiao
- Chen Heyi as Lin Fan
- Zhao Qing as Shi Hua
- Sun Jingjing as Hong Lian
- Vivian Chen as Qu Ke
- Dong Chun Hui as Cang Tu
- Pan Youcheng as Jiang Bian
- Ayden Sng as Long Yuan
- Hu Yunhao as Shangguan Riyue
- Zhang Zimu as Ning Yan
- Yuan Hongyang as Dan Yang
- Jin Xuze as Yin Tong Zi
- Yang Jinrui as Shi An / Lin Tao
- Yu Menglong as Xuan Tian Envoy
- An Yuexi as Wu You
- Huang Riying as Wan'er
- Xiaoli Zhen Zhen as General

== Production ==
The drama officially started shooting on April 8, 2024 at Hengdian World Studios and was announced to have finished filming on August 6 of the same year.
