= Yang Le (producer) =

Chinese television producer (born 1984)

- Born: 杨乐; 1984 (age 41–42); Jiangxi province, China
- Occupations: Television producer, Entrepreneur
- Years active: 2005–present
- Known for: Co-founder of Huanyu Entertainment; Producer of Story of Yanxi Palace
- Notable work: The Legend of Haolan; Winter Begonia

Yang Le (born 1984; Chinese: 杨乐; pinyin: Yáng Lè) is a Chinese television producer who is the co-founder and CEO of Huanyu Entertainment.

== Career ==
She was born in Jiangxi province and studied at Cheung Kong Graduate School of Business.

Yang entered the film and TV industry in 2005 and co-founded Huanyu Entertainment in 2012. Huanyu Entertainment is a Chinese company that offers a suite of services, including scriptwriting, production, distribution, as well as managing signed artistes.

Yang has produced several projects, including Story of Yanxi Palace, Winter Begonia, Royal Feast, and Delicacies Destiny. Story of Yanxi Palace has been translated into multiple languages and broadcast in several countries in Southeast Asia. Another drama produced by Yang, The Legend of Haolan, was distributed by Disney+ outside of China.

In December 2017, Yang Le was awarded the "Innovator of the Year" at the China Entertainment Industry Summit.

In September 2023, Yang led the company into a strategic partnership with Singapore's Mediacorp that was formalized with a memorandum of understanding (MOU). Under this agreement, select Mediacorp artists will be represented by Huanyu in China and select Huanyu artists will be represented by Mediacorp in other Southeast Asian markets.

In November 2023, Yang was appointed as the Ambassador for the Promotion of Intangible Cultural Heritage by the Zhejiang Provincial Department of Culture and Tourism, in recognition of her efforts in establishing the Film and Television Themed Intangible Cultural Heritage Museum in Hengdian, Zhejiang.

In December 2023, Yang attended the 24th Asia TV Forum & Market (ATF) in Singapore and spoke at a forum, discussing the prospects of Chinese television dramas, industry challenges, and partnerships.

On 13 March 2024, Yang was one of the speakers at the 28th Hong Kong International Film & Television Exhibition (FILMART).

In May 2024, Yang participated in the 20th Cultural Expo, and discussed integrating traditional Chinese culture into modern media and promoting cultural trade through creative innovation.

In December 2024, The Double, produced by Yang, was credited with adopting a diverse-talent centric approach that won the Annual Influential Award at the 2024 Annual Weibo Vision Conference.

== Filmography ==
=== TV Drama Works ===
Year	English title	Chinese title	Role	Ref.
2025	Wire Trap	巨额的真相	Producer	
2025	Gemini	金昭玉醉	Producer	
2025	Glory	玉茗茶骨	Producer, Chief Distributor	
2025	Feud	临江仙	Co-Producer, Chief Distributor	
2025	Five Blessings	五福临门	Producer, Chief Distributor	
2024	Phoenix: Her Legend	凤凰：她的传奇	Producer, Executive Producer, Chief Distributor	
2024	The Double	墨雨云间	Producer, Co-Producer, Chief Distributor, Executive Producer	
2023	Scent of Time	为有暗香来	Producer, Executive Producer, Chief Distributor	
2023	Gone with the Rain	微雨燕双飞	Producer, Executive Producer, Chief Distributor	
2023	Hi Producer	正好遇见你	Producer, Executive Producer, Chief Distributor	
2022	Legacy	传家	Producer, Executive Producer, Chief Distributor	
2022	Delicacies Destiny	珍馐记	Producer, Executive Producer, Chief Distributor	
2022	The Imperial Chef	尚食	Producer, Executive Producer, Chief Distributor	
2021	Song of Youth	玉楼春	Producer, Executive Producer, Chief Distributor	
2021	Court Lady	当家主母	Producer, Executive Producer, Chief Distributor	
2021	Double Mirror	双镜	Producer, Executive Producer, Chief Distributor	
2020	Winter Begonia	鬓边不是海棠红	Executive Producer, Chief Producer	
2020	Secret of Shiguang	拾光的秘密	Producer, Chief Distributor	
2019	The Burning Legion	烈火军校	Executive Producer, Producer, Chief Distributor	
2019	Yanxi Palace: Princess Adventures	金枝玉叶	Producer	
2019	The Legend of Haolan	皓镧传	Co-Producer, Executive Producer, Chief Distributor	
2018	Story of Yanxi Palace	延禧攻略	Executive Producer, Chief Distributor	
2018	Untouchable Lovers	凤囚凰	Distributor	
2017	Above the Clouds	云巅之上	Producer, Chief Distributor	
2017	King Is Not Easy	大王不容易	Chief Distributor	
2016	Demon Girl	半妖倾城	Distributor	
2016	Love Me If You Dare	美人为馅	Chief Planner	
2015	Ban Shu Legend	班淑传奇	Executive Producer, Chief Distributor	
2015	The Princess Wei Young	大汉情缘之云中歌	Chief Distributor, Executive Producer	
2014	The Romance of the Condor Heroes	神雕侠侣	Distributor	
2014	Beauty Maker	美人制造	Distributor	
2014	Palace 3: The Lost Daughter	宫锁连城	Chief Distributor	
2013	Swordsman	笑傲江湖	Executive Producer	
2013	The Palace: Lock of Silk Yarn	宫锁沉香	Chief Planner	
2013	Legend of Lu Zhen	陆贞传奇	Planner	
2012	Palace II	宫锁珠帘	Distributor	
2012	Immaculate Love: Beauty's Tears	山河恋美人无泪	Chief Distributor	
2011	Beauty World	国色天香	Distributor	
2008	The Last Princess	最后的格格	Distributor	
