= Huang Shengchi =

Chinese actor and host

- 黄圣池
- Born: February 5, 1995 (age 31); Shangrao, Jiangxi, China
- Education: Beijing Film Academy
- Occupations: Actor, host
- Years active: 2015–present

Huang Shengchi (Chinese: 黄圣池; pinyin: Huáng Shèngchí; born February 5, 1995) is a Chinese actor and television host. He gained recognition for his roles in youthful and athletic sports romance dramas, notably as Qi Baicao's loyal senior Qi Nan in The Whirlwind Girl 2 (2016), swimmer Qi Rui Feng in My Mr. Mermaid (2017), and Luo Xi in the romance adaptation Summer's Desire (2018).

== Early life and education ==
Huang was born on February 5, 1995, in Shangrao, Jiangxi province. In 2014, he was admitted to the Performance Department of the Beijing Film Academy to pursue formal acting studies.

== Career ==
Huang began his career in the entertainment industry in 2015 as a guest host for the iQIYI variety talk show Big Pair of Aces (大牌对王牌).

In 2016, he made his television acting debut in the youth sports drama The Whirlwind Girl 2, portraying Qi Nan. He rose to widespread attention in 2017 co-starring with Xiong Ziqi and Tan Songyun in the competitive swimming youth romance series My Mr. Mermaid, playing the skilled yet headstrong team captain Qi Rui Feng.

In 2018, Huang took on the leading role of Luo Xi opposite Zhang Xueying and Qin Junjie in the modern romance series Summer's Desire, adapted from the popular novel by Ming Xiaoxi.

In 2025, Huang starred as Fan Lianghan, the affable and easygoing second son-in-law married to Li Fuhui (Wu Xuanyi), in the ensemble historical romantic-comedy series Perfect Match, distributed internationally on Netflix and broadcast domestically on Hunan TV and Mango TV.

== Filmography ==
=== Television series ===
Year	English title	Chinese title	Role	Network	Notes
2016	The Whirlwind Girl 2	旋风少女第二季	Shen Zhou	Hunan TV	Supporting role
2017	Ice Fantasy Destiny	幻城凡世	Yang Dan	Tencent Video	Supporting role
2017	My Mr. Mermaid	浪花一朵朵	Qi Rui Feng	Hunan TV	Main cast
2018	Summer's Desire	泡沫之夏	Luo Xi	Zhejiang TV / iQIYI	Leading role
2019	Chasing Ball	追球	Bai Rongze	iQIYI	Supporting role
2020	Ugly Beauty	皮囊之下	Chen Mo	Youku	Leading role
2022	Belief	信仰	Cao Junsheng	Dragon TV	Supporting role
2025	Perfect Match	五福临门	Fan Lianghan	Hunan TV / Mango TV / Netflix	Main cast
