= Einstein and Einstein =

- Film poster
- Simplified Chinese: 狗十三
- Hanyu Pinyin: Gǒu shísān
- Directed by: Cao Baoping
- Written by: Jiao Huajing
- Produced by: Cao Baoping; Jeffrey Kong; Li Jie; Chen Lizhi; Yang Wei; Li Xiaoping; Liang Tongyu; Hou Guangming; Jiao Huajing; Mao Chuxiao
- Starring: Zhang Xueying; Guo Jinglin
- Cinematography: Luo Pan
- Edited by: Ma Yuanfei
- Music by: Baishui; Keju Luo
- Production companies: Xi'an Qujiang Shangguozhixiong Publishing and Audio & Visual Development & Communication; Beijing Standard Image Culture; Beijing Enlight Pictures; Beijing Yuntu Movie & Culture Media Co., Ltd. Maxtimes Culture (Tianjin) Films Company Limited; Hehe Pictures Corporation Limited; Shanghai Alibaba Pictures Co., Ltd. Beijing Benchmark Pictures Co., Ltd. Shanghai Bookong Culture Co., Ltd.
- Release dates: 11 October 2013 (Chinese Young Generation Film Forum); 7 December 2018 (China)
- Running time: 120 minutes
- Country: China
- Language: Mandarin

Einstein and Einstein (Chinese: 狗十三; pinyin: Gǒu shísān; lit. 'Dog 13') is a 2013 Chinese film directed by Cao Baoping and starring Zhang Xueying and Guo Jinglin. It was first played in October 2013 at the Youth Generation International Film Forum, and it was first played in theaters in China in 2018. The film was selected to compete for the Crystal Bear in Generation 14plus section at the 64th Berlin International Film Festival, where it won Special Mention Award (Grand Prix of the Generation 14plus International Jury).

== Synopsis ==
It is about a 13-year-old girl named Li Wan (李玩), played by Zhang Xueying (simplified Chinese: 张雪迎; traditional Chinese: 張雪迎), who struggles with her parents after her dog runs away.

== Cast ==
- Zhang Xueying as Li Wan
- Guo Jinglin as Li Wan's father
- Zhi Yitong as Grandpa
- Cao Xinyue as stepmother
- Huang Shijia as Li Tang
- Dai Xu as Gao Fang
- Zhou Zhen as Grandma
- Nie Xin as a woman

== Reception ==
=== Critical response ===
Elizabeth Kerr of The Hollywood Reporter wrote that the film has "a happy ending that suggests the modernization of China is an iterative process that will trickle down to the Li Wans of the world — eventually."
