= Huanyu Entertainment =

Chinese entertainment company

- Type: Production company
- Founded: 2012
- Headquarters: Chaoyang District, Beijing, China
- Key people: Yu Zheng, Yang Le
- Website: en.huanyuent.com

Huanyu Entertainment (also known as Huanyu Film and Television or simply Huanyu Film) is a Chinese production company and talent agency founded in 2012. The company was co-founded by Yu Zheng and Yang Le and is headquartered in Chaoyang District, Beijing.

== History ==
Huanyu Entertainment was founded in 2012 by Yu Zheng and Yang Le, both television producers from mainland China.

In 2018, Huanyu Entertainment's costume drama Story of Yanxi Palace, which was broadcast on iQIYI, amassed over 15 billion views on the platform. The series was subsequently broadcast in overseas markets on multiple streaming services. Story of Yanxi Palace ultimately became the most Googled television series of 2018, despite the search engine being heavily restricted in China.

The company has since expanded its partnership with more media networks including HBO, FOX, Netflix, and Disney+.

In August 2021, Huanyu Entertainment established the Huanyu Entertainment Cultural Museum in Hengdian city, Zhejiang, China. This is the first "Film & Television" themed museum dedicated to promoting China's intangible cultural heritage.

In January 2023, Huanyu Entertainment showcased traditional Chinese costumes and crafts at the "New Colors of Chinese Spring" Lantern Festival in Singapore, featuring attire from productions like The Legend of Haolan and Winter Begonia. This event highlighted the company's efforts to promote Chinese culture internationally.

== Productions ==
Television series produced by Huanyu Entertainment include the following:

Year	English title	Chinese title	Ref.
2003	Carry Me Fly and Walk Off	带我飞，带我走	
2004	Assassinator Jing Ke	荆轲传奇	
2005	Fireworks in March	烟花三月	
2005	Hedongshi	我爱河东狮	
2006	Concubines of the Qing Emperor	大清后宫	
2007	The Legend of Chu Liuxiang	楚留香传奇	
2008	The Last Princess	最后的格格	
2008	Rouge Snow	胭脂雪	
2008	Yiqian Di Yanlei	一千滴眼泪	
2009	Love Tribulations	锁清秋	
2009	Rose Martial World	玫瑰江湖	
2009	Good Wife and Mother	贤妻良母	
2010	Pretty Maid	大丫鬟	
2010	Beauty's Rival in Palace	美人心计	
2010	Happy Mother-in-Law, Pretty Daughter-in-Law	欢喜婆婆俏媳妇	
2010	Spell of the Fragrance	国色天香	
2011	Palace	宫锁心玉	
2011	Beauty World	唐宫美人天下	
2011	Hidden Minds	藏心术	
2012	Palace II	宫锁珠帘	
2012	Bounty Hunter	赏金猎人	
2012	Allure Snow	美人如画	
2012	Beauties of the Emperor	王的女人	
2012	Beauty without Tears	山河恋美人无泪	
2013	Swordsman	笑傲江湖	
2013	Legend of Lu Zhen	陆贞传奇	
2013	Old Days in Shanghai	像火花像蝴蝶	
2013	The Palace	宫锁沉香	
2013	Crazy for Palace	我为宫狂	
2014	Palace 3: The Lost Daughter	宫锁连城	
2014	Crazy for Palace II: Love Conquers All	我为宫狂2	
2014	Cosmetology High	美人制造	
2014	The Romance of the Condor Heroes	神雕侠侣	
2015	Love Yunge from the Desert	大汉情缘之云中歌	
2015	Legend of Ban Shu	班淑传奇	
2015	The Backlight of Love	逆光之恋	
2016	Demon Girl	半妖倾城	
2016	Memory Lost	美人为馅	
2017	Above the Clouds	云巅之上	
2017	King Is Not Easy	大王不容易	
2018	Untouchable Lovers	凤囚凰	
2018	Story of Yanxi Palace	延禧攻略	
2019	The Legend of Haolan	皓镧传	
2019	Arsenal Military Academy	烈火军校	
2019	Yanxi Palace: Princess Adventures	金枝玉叶	
2020	Winter Begonia	鬓边不是海棠红	
2020	Royal Kitchen In Qing Dynasty	紫禁城里的小食光	
2020	Consummation	拾光的秘密	
2021	Court Lady	骊歌行	
2021	Song of Youth	玉楼春	
2021	Mirrors	双镜	
2021	Marvelous Women	当家主母	
2022	Royal Feast	尚食	
2022	Delicacies Destiny	珍馐记	
2022	Legacy	传家	
2023	Hi Producer	正好遇见你	
2023	Gone with the Rain	微雨燕双飞	
2023	Scent of Time	为有暗香来	
2024	The Double	墨雨云间	
2024	The story of HER	凤凰：她的传奇	
2025	Perfect Match	五福临门	
2025	FEUD (Lament of the River Immortal)	临江仙	
2025	Glory	玉茗茶骨	

== Artists ==
Position	Members
Artists	Xu Kai, Wu Jinyan, Wang Xingyue, Nie Yuan, Yang Rong, Zhao Qing, Xia Zhiguang, Liang Yongqi, He Ruixian, Zhang Nan, Zhao Yiqin, Chang Long, Zhao Jiamin, Mi Jin, Yang Xinghui, Sun Qinghui, Li Zonghao, Chen Tengyue, Zhang Wanying, Zhang Yixi, Liu Qing, Gao Mingchen, Zheng Xin, Sun Ao, Jin Xuze, Qian Jin, Lu Yaxi, Zheng Kai, Liu Minghao, Wu Jiayi
Former	Bai Lu, Song Weilong
