= Princess Silver =

- Promotional poster
- Genre: Historical fiction Romance; Spy
- Based on: The White-Haired Imperial Concubine by Mo Yanshang
- Written by: Cheng Tingyu; Jing Yao; Shi Ying
- Directed by: Li Huizhu
- Starring: Zhang Xueying; Aarif Rahman; Jing Chao; Luo Yunxi; Chen Xinyu
- Ending theme: Xiao Zhi If Snow Forget Worries
- Country of origin: China
- Original language: Mandarin
- No. of seasons: 1
- No. of episodes: 58

Production
- Executive producer: Zhang Meng
- Producer: Lv Chao
- Production location: Hengdian Studio
- Production company: Shanghai Youhug Media

Original release
- Network: iQiyi, Tencent, Youku
- Release: May 15, 2019

Princess Silver (Chinese: 白发; pinyin: Bai Fa) is a 2019 Chinese television series based on the Web novel Bai Fa Huang Fei (Chinese: 白发皇妃; pinyin: Bai Fa Huang Fei, lit: The White-Haired Imperial Concubine) by Mo Yanshang. It stars Zhang Xueying, Aarif Rahman, Jing Chao, Luo Yunxi and Chen Xinyu. It aired on iQiyi, Tencent and Youku on May 15, 2019.

== Plot ==
At night, a girl rides a horse through the rain, pursued by assassins. She fights with them, but is eventually captured. She awakens in a palace with no memory of who she is. She is told she is Princess Rong Le (Princess Silver), the younger sister of Emperor Rong Qi of the Western Qi Kingdom, and she is to marry Zongzheng Wuyou, the seventh prince of the neighboring Northern Lin Kingdom, to create a marriage alliance between the two kingdoms. However, upon her arrival in Northern Lin, Zongzheng Wuyou refuses to marry Rong Le. WuYou doesn't believe in marriage alliances. Princess Rong Le is wearing a mask per the custom of Western Qi brides (only the groom can remove the mask of his bride) and proposes to the prince to let her stay as in the palace for six months, so as to get acquainted with the prince. If, after six months, the prince still feels the same way about the marriage alliance, then she will return to her country.

Unbeknownst to anyone, Princess Rong Le was also sent to Northern Lin to fulfill a different mission. It is rumored Minister Qin Yong had written an extraordinary book called the Mountains and Rivers Book which supposedly provides the secret of how a time of prosperity for any kingdom can be obtained. The book was lost when the Qin family was executed for treason. Princess Rong Le is set up as an owner of a tea house under the alias of Man Yao to collect information about it, find it and bring it back to Western Qi. Princess Rong Le as Man Yao meets Prince Wuyou and, eventually, fall in love, without him realizing Man Yao’s true identity.

When Prince Wuyou, finally, realizes Man Yao's true identity, they are forced to separate when Princess Rong Le’s brother Emperor Rong Qi suddenly shows up and forces her to marry the powerful General Fu Chou.

Everything turns into chaos with new enemies, revenge, double crosses, wars, new alliances, new truths, new lies and betrayals. Princess Rong Le must find out her true identity and try to save both kingdoms from war.

== Cast ==
=== Main ===
Actor	Character	Introduction
Zhang Xueying	Rong Le/Man Yao/Qin Man	Princess of Western Qi. She is sent to Northern Lin to form a marriage alliance with Prince Wu You. When she arrives in Northern Lin, she also disguises herself as the owner of a tea house, Embracing the Moon, named Man Yao in her mission to look for and obtain the Book of Mountain and River, a Legendary book of power. She is actually Qin Yong's daughter Qin Man. After her family was falsely accused of treason and executed, she was brought to Western Qi and became an assassin of the Hate of Heaven (Tianchou) Sect. Her memory was later wiped by Fu Yuan, using a deadly poison after she accidentally overheard secret plans and the love affair between Rong Qi and her was discovered. She is given the identity of Princess Rong Le and made to believe, she is sister to Rong Qi. She and Wu You have a son at the end, named Ying-Er
Aarif Rahman	ZongZheng Wu You	Prince Li (Seventh prince) of Northern Lin. An arrogant, accomplished and very intelligent man who doesn't care about courtly affairs. He rejects the marriage alliance to Princess Rong Le of Western Qi, but realizes, too late, his mistake when he finds out she is also Man Yao. He doesn't believe in love and has an aversion to being touched by women, due to the tragic marriage of his parents, Emperor Yun He and Lady Yun, until he meets Man Yao who he eventually falls deeply in love with. They get married after Rong Le/Man Yao gets the decree of divorce from Fu Chou and escaped to the Southern Fringes He and Rong Le have a son at the end, named Ying-Er.
Jing Chao	Fu Chou	Great general of Northern Lin, later Prince Regent of Northern Lin. Young master of Hate of Heaven (Tianchou) Sect. His mission in life is to avenge his mother, Fu Yuan, and bring chaos to Northern Lin. He is actually ZongZheng WuChou, a prince of Northern Lin and Wu You's twin brother. He eventually finds out, he was just a puppet controlled by Fu Yuan, who he thought was his mother. He married Rong Le to fulfill part of his revenge plans, but falls in love with her.
Luo Yunxi	Rong Qi	Emperor of Western Qi. A calm, rational, and distant man. He suffers from a poison passed on by his mother, Fu Yuan, to save herself and cannot live past the age of twenty-four. He and Qin Man loved each other, but they were forced to separate by Fu Yuan. To save him, Qin Man drinks a deadly poison which wipes her memory. He has to play along Qin Man is his sister, "Rong Le" or his mother will kill her. He does everything to ensure Rong Le's safety, but his actions are often misunderstood. He discovers his blood was the antidote to the poison within Rong Le. He died after saving Rong Le via blood transfusion.
Chen Xinyu	Hen Xiang	An assassin of the Hate of Heaven (Tianchou) Sect. Fu Chou's underling and confidant. She is set up with the Crown Prince to spy on him. She is Qin Yong's daughter, Qin Xiang; Qin Man/Rong Le's younger sister. She is not aware Rong Le is actually her sister until later, when she sees clues from Rong Le's memory flashbacks. She has a one-sided love for Fu Chou and ended up having an illegitimate baby girl, Nian, with him while disguised as Rong Le. Killed by Lin Shen.

=== Supporting ===
==== Northern Lin ====
Actor	Character	Introduction
Royal family
Canti Lau	Zongzheng Yunhe	Ruler of Northern Lin. He has made a lot of mistakes and hurt his loved ones due to his desire to build a strong kingdom. He was captured by Lin Shen, poisoned and rendered mute, and hidden in the palace. In the end, he reunites with his sons, Wu Chou, Wu You and Wu Yu. He meets with his grandson, Ying Er and granddaughter, Nian before he dies.
Nie Mei	Empress	The emperor's young wife. Her only wish is to ensure peace and maintain her position as the Empress. She constantly pushes Sun Yali to pair with Wu You, as she believes Wu You would be the future successor. She committed suicide when she learned Fu Yuan was going to be named Empress Dowager.
Deng Sha	Royal Consort Yun	Wuyou and Fu Chou's birth mother. She was accidentally killed by the Emperor after he was poisoned by Fu Yuan.
Mao Fan	Zongzheng Xuanming	Prince Fanyang. Trusted brother of the Emperor Yun He.
Liu Hanyang	Zongzheng Xiaoren	Crown Prince. A gullible and incapable man who is at odds with Wuyou. He was killed by Lin Shen.
Zhang Xuan	Crown Princess	She is often battered and verbally abused by the crown prince despite her sincere advise for him. She was killed by Lin Shen.
Shu Yxin	Zongzheng Wuyu	Prince Chen (Ninth prince). A cheerful and playful man. Wu You's closest brother. He likes Zhao Yun but later falls for Xiao Ke.
Yang Jingtian	Zongzheng Ying	Son of Rong Le and Wuyou.
-	Nian	Daughter of Fu Chou and Hen Xiang.
Others
Dai Wenwen	Sun Yali	Daughter of Sun Jizhou. A demure lady of noble birth. She has a close relationship with the Empress. She was saved by Fu Chou and fell in love with him, but later finds out he is only using her. She started to like Wu You after being saved by him and became jealous of Rong Le. She was goaded by Ling Yue to create a wedge between Rong Le and Wuyou, and eventually killed by Ling Yue.
Wen Zhu	Zhao Yun	Princess (Junzhu). A kind and cheerful girl. Wuyou and Wuyu's childhood friend. She likes Wuyu, but was forced to marry Ning Qianyi. She later falls in love with Ning Qianyi and becomes pregnant with his child. She leaves to travel the world after Ning Qianyi's death.
Ni Hanjin	Leng Yan	Wuyou's trusted subordinate.
Gao Guangze	Xiang Ying	Fu Chou's subordinate. He was punished and replaced after making a mistake. He was saved by Rong Le and pledged allegiance to her. He likes Hen Xiang. Killed by Lin Shen
Hu Yi	Chang Jian	Fu Chou's subordinate.
Li Siyang	Wu Xiangzi	Leader of Shadowless (Wuying) Sect. Wuyou's senior brother.
Lu Zhong	Sun Jizhou	Wuyou's teacher and Sun Yali's father. A selfish man who disregards others feelings for his own interests. He was manipulated by Fu Yuan to bring chaos to Wuyou's reign. He was killed by Fu Chou.
Li Daikun	Luo Zhi	General. A straight-forward poor man who rose up in the ranks to become a general and is loyal to his country. He took a liking to Yali, after hearing her play the lute at his victory celebration, and proposed marriage through Wuyou. He originally looked down on Rong Le, but admires her when she proves herself to him. He pledges allegiance to her.
Ding Zijun	Qin Yong	Former Prime Minister. Rong Le and Hen Xiang's real father and Wu You's former teacher. He was executed under false charges of treason.
Yang Chengming	Yang Wei	Minister of Rites. He is a loyal and forthright minister. He was killed by Fu Yuan after defying Fu Chou in court and retiring from his position as a protest.
Lu Zhuo	Yu Wenjie	A general who is in cahoots with the Crown Prince. He was secretly killed by the Crown Prince after his crimes were exposed by Wu You.
Wang Xiaohui	Xiang Cheng	Commander of the Imperial Troops. He was tasked by the Emperor to hunt down Fu Chou, who was a child at time, and kill him. Fu Chou was able to evade him for five years and was able to fake his death. He reported Fu Chou had fallen into the river and drowned. He was captured and killed by Fu Chou.
Zhang Bin	Cai Yanhe	Sun Jizhou's lackey.
Yu Peng	Minister Cao	
Guo Ruichen	Chun Ni	Sun Yali's servant. She was killed by Ling Yue.
Wang Ge	Qiu Yi	Head servant of the Princess manor. She was killed by Yu Wenjie.

==== Western Qi ====
Actor	Character	Introduction
Tian Hairong	Fu Yuan	Grand Dowager of Western Qi. Former Empress of Northern Lin. Princess of Chen kingdom, who was betrothed to Zongzheng Yunhe. Her husband betrayed her by letting Emperor Rong Yi of Western Qi rape her, and attempted to burn her alive. Out of hatred, she decided to orchestrate a grand revenge plan and pit the Northern Lin princes against one another. After her son, Rong Qi, dies, she commits suicide by jumping into a fire.
Tian Lei	Lin Shen	Leader of the Hate of Heaven (Tianchou) Sect. Qin Yong's brother. Rong Le and Hen Xiang's uncle. He abandoned his family and went to become a eunuch in the palace as he loved Fu Yuan, and later assists her with her revenge plans. He was killed by Wuyou.
Wang Yu	Ling Yue/Qing Hu	Rong Le's servant. An assassin of the Hate of Heaven (Tianchou) Sect sent to watch over Rong Le. She appears weak but is sharp and adept in disguise. She likes Xiao Sha. She is killed by Xiao Sha after her identity was exposed.
Gao Shuang	Xiao Sha	Rong Qi's personal guard, who was sent to protect Rong Le. He was being blackmailed to spy on Rong Le as his sister Xieo Ke was being held hostage. After Rong Le frees her, he swears his undying loyalty to Rong Le. He likes Ling Yue.
Mi Mi	Xiao Ke	Disciple of the master physician. Xiao Sha's younger sister. An innocent and naive girl and Rong Le's ally. She likes Wu Yu.
Wang Chun	Long Yue	A shadow assassin of Western Qi, who disguises as Rong Le's assistant at the teahouse. She later committed suicide out of desperation and guilt, trying to save Rong Le.
Yang Xue	Xiao Wei	A subordinate at the teahouse. She was later killed by Rong Qi's subordinates.
Zou Xin Yu	Lian Xin	Rong Le's servant. She was sent away by Rong Le after her betrayal was exposed.
Liu Haoqun	Yin Wei	Rong Qi's shadow guard.
Dong Dou	Xiao Xunzi	Rong Qi's servant.

==== Chen kingdom ====
Actor	Character	Introduction
Lu Zhanxiang	Emperor	A child emperor who plays dumb, but is actually very poised and smart.
Xu Ke	Ning Qianyi	Prince Zhenbei. A scheming and ambitious man whose plan is to rule over the world. He likes and later marries Zhao Yun.
Huang Cancan	Chen Yu/Luo Yan	A qin player who was saved by Rong Le from the brothel. Ning Qianyi's subordinate, and was tasked to look for the Mountains and Rivers Tome. Years later, she sided with Rong Le again as she longed for peace. She became Ying and Nian's teacher in the School of Wisdom.
Chen Zhongfu	Li Wu	Ning Qianyi's subordinate.

== Production ==
The series began filming in April 2018 at Hengdian Studio, and wrapped up in August 2018.

== Soundtrack ==
No.	Title	Lyrics	Music	Singers	Length
1.	"Xiao Zhi (小至)" (Theme song)	Liu Chang	Tan Xuan	Yisa Yu & Aarif Rahman
2.	"Inviting Moon (邀月)"	Duan Sisi	Tan Xuan	Li Qi
3.	"Red Dust Slightly Burns (红尘微烫)"	Duan Sisi	Huang Bo	Lu Yi
4.	"If Snow (若雪)" (Wu You's theme song)	Xu Zhongling	Aarif Rahman	Aarif Rahman
5.	"Forget Worries (忘忧)" (Rong Le's theme song)	Duan Sisi	Dan Yulong	Zhang Xueying	4:09
6.	"Leaving the Shore (离舟)" (Rong Qi's theme song)	Liu Chang	Chen Sitong	Su Xing
7.	"Heart Lock (心锁)" (Fu Chou's theme song)	Liu Chang	Zeng Di	Jin Runjie

== Awards and nominations ==
Award	Category	Nominee	Results	Ref.
Golden Bud - The Fourth Network Film And Television Festival	Best Web Series	Princess Silver	Nominated	
Golden Bud - The Fourth Network Film And Television Festival	Best Actor	Luo Yunxi	Nominated	
Golden Bud - The Fourth Network Film And Television Festival	Best Actress	Zhang Xueying	Nominated	
