= Betty Zhou =

Chinese actress and singer (born 1987)

- Born: October 31, 1981 (age 44); Jiangsu, China
- Occupations: Actress, Host, Producer
- Years active: 2007–present

Betty Zhou (born October 31, 1981) is a Chinese actress, singer, producer, sports commentator and television host. She hosts her show Talking to Hollywood with Betty Zhou on CCTV.

She is active in China & Singapore. In 2013, she became the first bilingual anchor from China to cover the NBA finals.

== Early life ==
Betty Zhou was born in the Jiangsu, China. When she was younger, Zhou had dreamt of becoming a journalist, even a war correspondent who could venture into conflict zones. She later decided that she would become an actress and went on to study performing arts at Shanghai Normal University's Xie Jin Film & Television Art College.

== Career ==
Betty Zhou was educated in Mainland China for acting, but began her acting career in Singapore, where she learnt to speak English fluently whilst preparing for the TV series Adventure Girls and Kung Fu Killer. Zhou's foray into the entertainment industry started even before she graduated from college in 2007. An overseas production company had talent-spotted Zhou and subsequently signed her on to star in Adventure Girls. As the title suggests, the travel program featured Zhou and another co-host in search of adventure in countries such as Thailand, Malaysia and the Philippines, taking part in outdoor activities such as bungee jumping, diving and rock climbing. Zhou later got to know some industry people from Singapore and was offered an acting career there. She decided to relocate to Singapore for a few years to hone her craft, and the move paid off as she managed to gain a considerable amount of exposure there, featuring in numerous magazines and television shows. During her time there, Zhou had the honor of becoming the only actress from China to star in a leading role in an English language production.

A few years later, Zhou got to meet renowned Taiwanese R&B singer David Tao, who offered her a job back in China. Following this, Zhou was presented with the opportunity to front NBA coverage in her basketball-crazy country, and despite knowing nothing about the sport, she gamely took up the challenge, putting due diligence into researching the sport in order to become a credible host. She also taught herself Cantonese for her appearances in Hong Kong.

In 2013 she started hosting basketball coverage in China on Chinese Central Television, including the weekly program Sensual NBA. Although she did not follow basketball before she began hosting basketball shows, reviews for her understanding of basketball terminology were generally positive. She was the first Chinese bilingual presenter to attend and cover the NBA Finals in 2013.

=== Talking to Hollywood with Betty Zhou ===
In May 2015 she started hosting Talking to Hollywood with Betty Zhou, a Chinese Central Television program broadcast on Baidu's iQIYI platform. It was co-created by Rob Moore and produced with the support of Paramount Pictures, Walt Disney Studios, Universal Studios, and Sony Pictures Entertainment. As the host of Talking to Hollywood with Betty Zhou, she has rubbed shoulders with the likes of Arnold Schwarzenegger, Tom Cruise, Adam Sandler and Zoe Saldana. Created by a host of big names such as Paramount Pictures, Universal Pictures, Sony Pictures Entertainment and Walt Disney Studios, the show gives Chinese audiences an exclusive and intimate look into the world's largest entertainment industry.

== Filmography ==
=== Film ===
Year	Title	Role
2008	Kung Fu Killer	Siren Crane
2010	China Doll	Waitress
2011	Pay Day	Long Le
2012	The Man With the Iron Fists	Jack Knife's Widow
2017	xXx: The Return of Xander Cage	Club Announcer

== Primary Works ==
=== TV Series ===
Year	Title	TV Station	Director
2011	“Payday” – Actress	Singapore, Channel 5	Daisy lrani
2010	“Point of Entry”	Singapore, Channel 5	
2010	“Wrongful Love” 《错爱》	Zhejiang Satellite TV	
2010	“Want to Love Again” 《好想再爱一次》	Zhejiang Satellite TV	
2009	“Mr. & Mrs. Kok” 《神探妙夫妻》	Singapore, Channel 8	
2008	“Housewives’ Holiday” 《主妇的假期》	Singapore, Channel 8	
2007	“Adventure Girls” 《丽险记》- Actress	Singapore, Channel 5 Malaysia TV Channel	

=== Live Interviews ===
Time	Station	Location	Language
2014	“Fairchild TV”	Canada	Mandarin and Cantonese
2014	“Fairchild Radio AM1470”	Canada	Cantonese
2014	“CNR Radio FM101.8”	China	Mandarin
2013	“Phoenix URadio”	Hong Kong	Mandarin
2013	“D100 Radio”	Hong Kong	Cantonese
2011	“FM987 Radio”	Singapore	English

=== Event Hosting ===
Year	Title	Channel	Partner Host
2014	“NBA Match Arena” 《NBA赛场》 （Weekly Broadcast）	Chongqing Satellite TV	
2014	“NFL Super Bowl” 《NFL超级碗》	Chongqing Satellite TV	
2013 to now	“Very NBA” 《聲色NBA》	Sina Net	
2013	“Fun in the East” 《乐享东方》	GETV	
2013	“Jeanswest Entertainment Live” 《真维斯-娱乐现场》	Education Channel, Shanghai Satellite TV	
2013	“Million Idol Singer” (Grand Final) 《百万唱将》年度总决赛	Shandong Satellite TV	

=== Hosting Experiences ===
Year	Title	Location	Participating Guest
2016	"xXx: The Return of Xander Cage"	Toronto	Vin Diesel, Donnie Yen, Kris Wu, Nina Dobrev
2016	"Zoolander No. 2"	New York	Alexander Wand, Marc Jacobs
2016	"Ninja Turtles: Out of the Shadows"	New York	Stephen Amell
2015	"Star Trek Beyond"	Los Angeles	Justin Lin
2015	"Jack Reacher: Never Go Back"	New Orleans	Tom Cruise, Colbie Smulders
2015	"Star Wars: The Force Awakens"	Los Angeles	JJ Abrams
2015	"007: Spectre"	Beijing	Daniel Craig
2015	"The Hunger Games: Mockingjay" China Premiere	Beijing	Jennifer Lawrence, Josh Hutchinson, Liam Hemsworth
2015	"Terminator Genysis"	Shanghai	Arnold Schwarzenegger, Alan Taylor, Jane Zhang
2015	"Mission Impossible 5: Rogue Nation" China Premiere, Press Conference, Fan Meeting	Shanghai	Tom Cruise, Rebecca Ferguson, Christopher McQuarrie
2015	"Mission Impossible 5: Rogue Nation" Global Premiere	Vienna	Tom Cruise, Simon Pegg, Rebecca Ferguson, Christopher McQuarrie
2015	"Official Opening of Adidas Flagship Store"	Shanghai	Zhai Xiaochuan
2015	"NBA Official Forum"	Shanghai	James Harden
2015	"San Diego Comic-Con"	San Diego	San Diego
2015	Brand endorsement conference for Rain	Shanghai	Rain
2015	"Jurassic World"	Beijing	Chris Pratt
2015	"Pixels"	Los Angeles, Las Vegas	Adam Sandler, Chris Columbus
2015	"Ant Man"	Las Vegas	Paul Rudd
2015	Star Trek Beyond	Vancouver	Zoe Saldana, Simon Pegg
2015	"Mind Team" Promo Event	San Francisco	Peter Dougard
2015	"Ninja Turtles II: Out of the Shadows" Promo Event	Los Angeles	Megan Fox
2015	"The Walk" Promo Event	Los Angeles	Joseph Gordon-Levitt
2015	NBA 2K Online Press Conference	Guangzhou	LeBron James
2014 Aug	Mobil; 40th anniversary	Shanghai	
2014 Aug	"Budweiser STORM EDM Festival"; Press conference host	Beijing, Guangzhou	
2014 Jul	CQTV & CSPN; Interview with Reggie Jackson	Shanghai	Reggie Jackson
2014 Jul	Adidas; Jeremy Lin China Tour	Shanghai	Jeremy Lin 林书豪
2014 Jun	"Transformers 4"; Hong Kong Movie Premiere; Interview with Producer and China Movie Premiere	Hong Kong, Beijing	Michael Bay, Nicola Peltz, Li Bingbing, Han Geng
2014 May - Aug	"Redbull Freestyle Football Cup"	Beijing, Shanghai, Guangzhou	Leo 吴磊
2014 Apr	"CBA & Mobil Super"; Meeting with Wang Zhizhi	Kunming	Wang Zhizhi 王治郅
2013 Nov	《Hermes/ 爱马仕丝巾乐园活动》	Beijing, Shanghai	
2013 Oct	GETV《乐享东方》	Beijing	Huang Hai Bo 黄海波
2013 Oct	NBA China Games《王牌球迷》	Beijing, Shanghai	Dell Curry, Tyrone Curtis Bogues, A.C. Green Jr.
2013 Oct	《NBA巨星-德里克 罗斯中国行》	Hang Zhou	Derrick Rose
2013 Sep	《NBA巨星-凯文加内特中国行》 (SINA interview)	Beijing	Kevin Garnett
2013 Sep	《NBA巨星-阿尔德里奇中国行》	Beijing	Bolin Chen 陈柏霖, LaMarcus Aldridge
2013 Aug	《NBA巨星-霍华德中国行》	Chengdu	Dwight Howard
2013 Aug	《NBA巨星-科比中国行》	Shanghai	Kobe Bryant
2013 Aug	《NBA巨星-詹姆斯中国行》 (Tencent interview)	Guangzhou	LeBron Raymone James
2013 Jul	《NBA巨星-卢比奥、霍勒迪、沃尔、利拉德、康利中国行》	Beijing, Shanghai, Xi'an, Guangzhou	Ricky Rubio, Jrue Holiday, John Wall, Damian Lillard, Mike Conley
2013 Jun	NBA The Finals (Exclusive coverage throughout the NBA Finals last season NBA2013-2014 official mission)	San Antonio, Miami	Adam Silver, LeBron Raymone James, Dwyane Tyrone Wade, Chris Bosh, Tony Parker, Tracy McGrady, Shane Battier, etc.
2013	NBA Superstar - Derrick Rose in China	Beijing, Shanghai, Guangzhou	Derrick Rose

=== Publications ===
Year	Title	Country	Remarks
2014	“MiLK New Trends” 《MiLK新潮流》	Hong Kong and China	Main Cover, Interview
2014	“SO COOL”	Hong Kong and China	Main Cover, Interview
2014	“Dime Basketball World” 《Dime篮天下》	USA and China	Main Cover, Interview
2013	“Basketball Pioneers” 《篮球先锋报》	China	Interview
2013	“Covergirl” 《瑞丽美容与服饰》	China	Interview
2013	“Metrostyle” 《新大都会》	China	Main Cover, Interview
2013	“I Money”	Hong Kong	Interview
2013	“Power Wave” 《钻篮》	China	Main Cover, Interview
2013	“For Him Magazine” 《FHM男人装》	China	Interview
2013	“San Antonio Newsflash”	USA	Cover Story
2013	“New York Times” (Sports Section)	USA	Report
2013	“Prestige”	Hong Kong	Report
2013	“Straits Times”	Singapore	Interview
2013	“Today”	Singapore	Interview
2013	“8 Days Magazine”	Singapore	Interview
2012	“Taste” 《Taste品味》	China	Interview
2012	“Metrostyle” 《新大都会》	China	Main Cover, Featured Author
2012	“Belong Magazine” 《体育博览》	China	Main Cover, Interview
2011	“For Him Magazine” (Top 20 Sexiest Women in the World)	Singapore	Main Cover, Interview
2010	“For Him Magazine”	Singapore	Interview
