= Perfect Match (2025 TV series) =

2025 Chinese television series

- Promotional poster
- 五福临门; Wǔ Fú Lín Mén
- Genre: Historical comedy-drama; Romantic comedy
- Written by: Zhou Mo
- Directed by: Yang Huan; Bai Yunmo; Ma Shige
- Starring: Lu Yuxiao; Wang Xingyue; Ni Hongjie; Liu Xiening; Chen Heyi; Wu Xuanyi; Huang Shengchi; Ke Ying; Liang Yongqi; Huangyang Tiantian; Dong Sicheng
- Country of origin: China
- Original language: Mandarin
- No. of seasons: 1
- No. of episodes: 36

Production
- Running time: 45 minutes

Original release
- Network: Hunan TV; Mango TV; Netflix
- Release: January 25, 2025 – 2025

Related
- Perfect Match: A Trip of Friendship

Perfect Match (Chinese: 五福临门; pinyin: Wǔ Fú Lín Mén) is a 2025 Chinese historical romantic comedy television series directed by Yang Huan, Bai Yunmo, and Ma Shige. It stars Lu Yuxiao, Wang Xingyue, Ni Hongjie, Liu Xiening, and Wu Xuanyi. The series premiered on Mango TV on January 25, 2025, and broadcast on Hunan Television and internationally on Netflix.

== Synopsis ==
Set during the Northern Song dynasty in Bianjing (modern-day Kaifeng), the story follows Madam Li, a recently widowed matriarch from Luoyang who moves to the capital with her daughters following the death of her husband. Hoping to secure stable futures and prosperous marriages for her five spirited daughters, Madam Li opens the Sifu Teahouse. Along the way, the Li women navigate social politics, family rivalries, and romantic encounters across the capital.

== Cast ==
=== Main ===
- Ni Hongjie as Madam Li: The matriarch of the Li family.
- Lu Yuxiao as Li Kangning (Li Sanniang): The sharp-witted third daughter of the Li family.
- Wang Xingyue as Chai An: The ambitious, wealthy head of the prominent Chai household and Kangning's husband.
- Liu Xiening as Li Shouhua (Li Daniang): The eldest daughter, a dignified and intelligent young widow.
- Wu Xuanyi as Li Fuhui (Li Erniang): The outspoken and spirited second daughter.
- Huang Shengchi as Fan Lianghan: Fuhui's good-natured husband.
- Chen Heyi as Du Yangxi: An ambitious young scholar aiming for imperial office and Shouhua's husband.
- Ke Ying as Li Haode (Li Siniang): The determined fourth daughter.
- Liang Yongqi as Shen Huizhao: An upright imperial magistrate and Haode's husband.
- Huangyang Tiantian as Li Leshan (Li Wuniang): The playful youngest daughter.
- Dong Sicheng (Winwin) as Yang Xian: A nobleman from an influential family and Leshan's husband.

=== Supporting ===
- Ling Meishi as Qiongnu: The Li family's adopted foster daughter-in-law.
- Lin Peng as Lady Qiu (Shen Mu): Shen Huizhao's difficult and demanding paternal aunt.
- Zhao Jiamin as Hong Xiu: An attendant serving in the inner quarters.
- Yuan Dabao as Xue Guang: The Minister of the Court of Judicature and Shen Huizhao's mentor.
- Li Jiajia as Yinping: A maidservant in the Yang household.
- Zhang Zhiwei as Butler Chai: The trusted head steward of the Chai residence.
- Yao Ruihan as Jiaojiao: The young daughter of Fan Lianghan and Li Fuhui.

=== Guest appearances ===
- Zeng Shunxi as Emperor
- Zhao Ziqi as Empress Liu
- Lan Yingying as Yang Yueniang
- Ding Jiali as Madame Shen, Shen Huizhao's mother
- Shen Baoping as Yang Demao
- Huang Cancan as Yin Yao
- Lu Zhaohua as Fang Yuchan
- Xue Bayi as Master Huijing (Hui Jing Shi Tai)

== Episodes ==
Arc	Episodes	Main focus	Original broadcast date	Synopsis
1	1–10	Kangning & Chai An	January 25–29, 2025	Madam Li and her daughters relocate to Bianjing and open the Sifu Teahouse. Kangning repeatedly clashes in business and wits with Chai An before their growing mutual respect leads to marriage.
2	11–19	Shouhua & Du Yangxi	January 30 – February 3, 2025	The widowed eldest sister Shouhua marries the younger scholar Du Yangxi after he passes the imperial examinations, working together to overcome misunderstandings and past adversaries.
3	20–28	Haode & Shen Huizhao	February 4–7, 2025	Haode enters a contracted marriage with the austere judge Shen Huizhao. When an accident causes him to lose his memory, she supports his judicial duties and helps clear high-profile wrongful convictions.
4	29–36	Leshan & Yang Xian	February 8–11, 2025	The spirited youngest daughter Leshan is unexpectedly wed to nobleman Yang Xian. Following a family downfall and Yang Xian's return from trading abroad, the family reunites with their long-lost son and celebrates Madam Li's birthday at the newly christened "Liufu Teahouse".

Title	Directed by	Written by	Original release date
1	"Episode 1"	January 25, 2025	
Newly arrived in Bianjing, Madam Li is turned away by her daughter's household. Kangning helps Fuhui teach Fan Lianghan a sharp lesson.
2	"Episode 2"	January 25, 2025	
The Sifu Teahouse opens across from Pan Tower, immediately sparking business rivalry with Chai An.
3	"Episode 3"	January 25, 2025	
A costly zither sparks a battle of wits between Kangning and Chai An ahead of Mid-Autumn Festival festivities.
4	"Episode 4"	January 25, 2025	
Kangning organizes a banquet to diffuse tensions with Yang Xian while Madam Li looks into prospective suitors.
5	"Episode 5"	January 26, 2025	
Chai An and Kangning coordinate to hold Liang Junqing accountable during the Double Ninth festival celebrations.
6	"Episode 6"	January 26, 2025	
Chai An expresses his desire to marry Kangning, leading to rising tension between the two matriarchs over dowry arrangements.
7	"Episode 7"	January 27, 2025	
Sifu Teahouse hosts a literary competition for imperial exam candidates, crossing paths with scholar Du Yangxi.
8	"Episode 8"	January 27, 2025	
Du Yangxi recuperates at the Li residence while Chai An attempts to disrupt matchmaking plans.
9	"Episode 9"	January 28, 2025	
A candid discussion with Shouhua prompts Kangning to reflect on her authentic feelings toward Chai An.
10	"Episode 10"	January 28, 2025	
The anticipated wedding day arrives, culminating in Chai An marrying Kangning while Du Yangxi is matched with Shouhua.
11	"Episode 11"	January 29, 2025	
Shouhua and Du Yangxi begin married life under distant terms amidst societal gossip in the capital.
12	"Episode 12"	January 29, 2025	
Kangning and Fuhui investigate malicious rumors circulated by local rivals targeting Shouhua's reputation.
13	"Episode 13"	January 30, 2025	
Du Yangxi realizes the depth of Shouhua's literary talents and intervenes to defend her honor.
14	"Episode 14"	January 30, 2025	
A mutual trial along the Bian River allows Shouhua and Du Yangxi to clear long-standing doubts.
15	"Episode 15"	January 31, 2025	
The Li sisters attend a high-society garden party, fending off underhanded schemes from noble rivals.
16	"Episode 16"	January 31, 2025	
Chai An and Fan Lianghan unmask the conspirators framing the Li household.
17	"Episode 17"	February 1, 2025	
Du Yangxi faces political peril after whistleblowing on official corruption before being exonerated.
18	"Episode 18"	February 1, 2025	
Shouhua and Du Yangxi reaffirm their marital commitment as Fuhui gives birth to a daughter.
19	"Episode 19"	February 2, 2025	
The Li household celebrates their newfound stability as matchmaking turns toward fourth daughter Haode.
20	"Episode 20"	February 2, 2025	
Haode uses legal acumen in court to expose false claimants, catching the eye of judge Shen Huizhao.
21	"Episode 21"	February 3, 2025	
Following an unexpected arrangement, Shen Huizhao suffers memory loss, and Haode steps in to help him.
22	"Episode 22"	February 3, 2025	
Haode stands her ground against hostile in-laws while aiding Shen Huizhao in mediating civil disputes.
23	"Episode 23"	February 4, 2025	
Shen Huizhao begins piecing together his memories as Haode takes on the case of an unjustly convicted prisoner.
24	"Episode 24"	February 4, 2025	
Haode, Huizhao, and Yangxi uncover key physical evidence, overturning a grave miscarriage of justice.
25	"Episode 25"	February 5, 2025	
While visiting a mountain temple, Haode and Leshan narrowly escape danger with timely assistance from Yang Xian.
26	"Episode 26"	February 5, 2025	
An old betrothal contract emerges to challenge Haode's status, but she uses legal wit to dismantle the scheme.
27	"Episode 27"	February 6, 2025	
A complex homicide case tests Shen Huizhao's judicial impartiality before the truth is brought to light.
28	"Episode 28"	February 6, 2025	
Political enemies fail in their conspiracy against Huizhao, who holds a formal wedding ceremony to honor Haode.
29	"Episode 29"	February 7, 2025	
Chaos during a bridal procession leads to youngest daughter Leshan becoming married to the unpredictable Yang Xian.
30	"Episode 30"	February 7, 2025	
Leshan brings Yang Xian to the Li residence, where the sisters and brothers-in-law put his resolve to the test.
31	"Episode 31"	February 8, 2025	
Leshan cleverly unravels a plot within the Yang household intended to pin treasonous blame on Yang Xian.
32	"Episode 32"	February 8, 2025	
During the imperial spring festival festivities, Yang Xian and Leshan thwart sabotage to secure royal recognition.
33	"Episode 33"	February 9, 2025	
When the Yang family suffers financial disaster, Madam Li takes them in while Yang Xian vows to rebuild his fortunes.
34	"Episode 34"	February 9, 2025	
Backed by Chai An, Yang Xian embarks on maritime merchant trade to Quanzhou to prove his worth.
35	"Episode 35"	February 10, 2025	
Years later, Yang Xian returns successful, coinciding with the Li family reuniting with their long-separated brother.
36	"Episode 36"	February 11, 2025	
Corrupt officials are brought to justice. On Madam Li's birthday, the family renames the shop to "Liufu Teahouse" in celebration.

== Release ==
The series premiered on January 25, 2025, on Mango TV, followed by its domestic television broadcast on Hunan TV on January 27, 2025. The series was distributed globally by Netflix under the English title Perfect Match.
