= He Ruixian =

Chinese actress (born 1994)

- Born: November 4, 1994 (age 31); Guyang, Guizhou, China
- Education: Beijing Film Academy
- Occupation: Actress
- Years active: 2016–present
- Agent: Huanyu Entertainment
- Height: 166 cm (5 ft 5 1/2 in)

Chinese name
- Simplified Chinese: 何瑞贤
- Hanyu Pinyin: Hé Ruìxián

He Ruixian (Chinese: 何瑞贤; pinyin: Hé Ruìxián, born November 4, 1994) is a Chinese actress under Huanyu Entertainment. She is best known for her roles in Go Ahead (2020), Royal Feast (2022), Delicacies Destiny (2022), Game of True Love (2025) and Feud (2025).

== Early life and education ==
He Ruixian was born on November 4, 1994, in Guyang, Guizhou, China. She graduated from Beijing Film Academy.

== Filmography ==
=== Television series ===
Year	Title	Role	Notes	Ref.
2016	Demon Girl	Jiang Xuewu		
2016	Jin Ling Battle	Xiao Cui		
2018	To Love To Heal	Jiang Yuru		
2020	Winter Begonia	Liu Yuehong		
2020	Go Ahead	Tang Can		
2021	Court Lady	Lu Yingying		
2021	Wonderful Time	Shi Di		
2022	Royal Feast	Yin Ziping		
2022	Delicacies Destiny	Ling Xiaoxiao		
2023	Warm on a Cold Night	Chi Lan		
2023	Skip a Beat	Qiao Jing		
2024	As Beautiful as You	Li Li		
2025	Game of True Love	Xu Nuo		
2025	Feud	Fan Linger		
2025	Sword and Beloved	Long Weiyu		
2026	No Pain No Gain	Xin Hailu		
2026	Love for You	Tu Li		
TBA	Xu Ni Wan Zhang Guang Mang Hao	Ning Xi		

== Awards and nominations ==
Year	Award	Category	Nominee(s)/Work(s)	Result	Ref.
2025	Asian Academy Creative Awards	Best Actress in a Supporting Role – China	He Ruixian (for Feud)	Won	
2025	Weibo TV & Internet Video Summit	Young Progressive Actor of the Year	He Ruixian	Won	
2025	iQIYI Scream Night	Top 10 Actor of the Year	He Ruixian	Won	
