= Chen Xinhai =

Chinese actor (born 2001)

- Born: July 5, 2001 (age 25); Putian, Fujian, China
- Other name: Ocean
- Occupation: Actor
- Years active: 2020–present
- Agent: Yide Culture
- Height: 183 cm (6 ft 0 in)

Chinese name
- Simplified Chinese: 陈鑫海
- Hanyu Pinyin: Chén Xīnhǎi

Chen Xinhai (Chinese: 陈鑫海, born July 5, 2001) is a Chinese actor. He is best known for his roles in The Double (2024) and Feud (2025).

== Filmography ==
=== Television series ===
| Year | Title | | Role | Network | Notes | Ref. |
| Year | English | Chinese | Role | Network | Notes | Ref. |
|---|---|---|---|---|---|---|
| 2023 | Mask | 人设 | Meng De | iQIYI, Tencent Video | Support role | |
| 2023 | Taste of Love | 绝配酥心唐 | Lu Yanzhi | iQIYI | Support role | |
| 2023 | Falling Before Fireworks | 最食人间烟火色 | Jing Chen | iQIYI | Main role | |
| 2023 | The Love You Give Me | 你给我的喜欢 | Chen Jiajun | Tencent Video | Support role | |
| 2023 | Moonlight | 我亲爱的白月光 | Fei Mingxuan | Mango TV | Main role | |
| 2024 | The Double | 墨雨云间 | Ye Shijie | Youku | Support role | |
| 2025 | Love of the Divine Tree | 仙台有树 | Su Yu | iQIYI | Support role | |
| 2025 | Feud | 临江仙 | Zhang Suan | iQIYI | Main role | |
| 2025 | The Unclouded Soul | 逍遥 | A Li | iQIYI | Support role | |
| TBA | Wish You All The Best | 表妹万福 | Pei Youan | Tencent Video | Main role | |
| TBA | The Melody of Love | 古乐风华录 | Shao Yi | Tencent Video | Main role | |
| TBA | Romance Next Door | 兄友妹恭 | Chen An | Tencent Video | Main role | |
| TBA | Wanhua Sin | 万花世界 | | Tencent Video | | |

== Awards and nominations ==
| Year | Award | Category | Nominee(s)/Work(s) | Result | Ref. |
|---|---|---|---|---|---|
| 2025 | Tencent Video Star Awards | Progressive Artist of the Year | Chen Xinhai | Won | |
