= Wang Xingyue =

Chinese actor (born 2002)

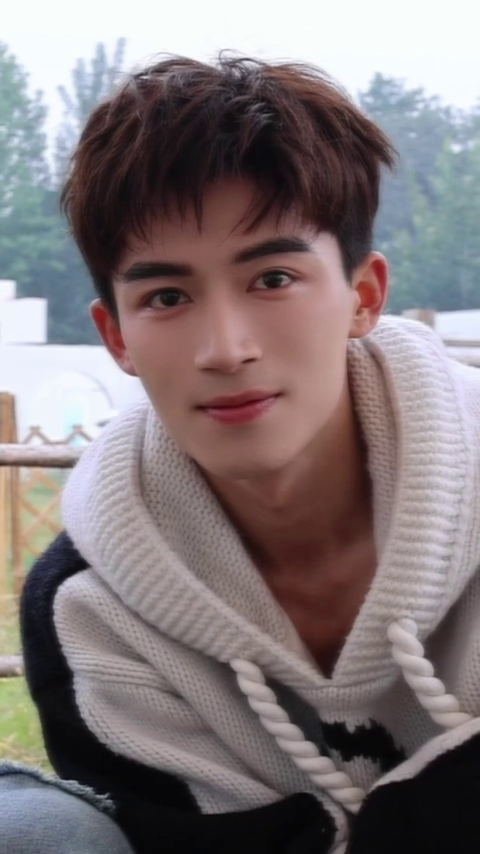
- Wang in December 2023
- Born: Wang Tao; March 5, 2002 (age 24); Yueyang, China
- Education: Performance Department of the Central Academy of Drama
- Occupations: Actor; model
- Years active: 2019–present
- Agent: Huanyu Entertainment
- Height: 184 cm (6 ft 1/2 in)

Chinese name
- Traditional Chinese: 王星越
- Simplified Chinese: 王星越
Transcriptions
Standard Mandarin
- Hanyu Pinyin: Wáng Xīngyuè

Wang Xingyue (Chinese: 王星越; pinyin: Wáng Xīngyuè), born Wang Tao (Chinese: 王涛; pinyin: Wáng Tāo, born on 5 March 2002), is a Chinese actor. He rose to fame for his role in the costume drama The Double (2024).

== Early life and career ==
Wang Xingyue was born Wang Tao on March 5, 2002, in Yueyang, Hunan, China. He graduated from the Performance Department of the Central Academy of Drama. During his college years, he participated in numerous stage plays and auditioned for the film Deep Water during his sophomore year, successfully landing his first role.

On May 31, 2020, Wang signed a contract with Huanyu Entertainment. Later that year, he appeared in the drama You Complete Me. In 2021, he starred in the television dramas One and Only and Your Sensibility My Destiny. In 2022, Wang played the lead role of Crown Prince Zhu Shoukui in the historical fiction drama Delicacies Destiny. The series became the first original Chinese-language production to stream on Disney+.

In 2023, Wang gained recognition for his role as Zhong Xiwu in the romantic web drama Scent of Time, based on Qi Yueli's novel The Female Supporting Role (洗铅华). He achieved his breakout success for his role in the costume drama The Double (2024).

== Ambassadorships ==
In October 2024, CCTV News announced his appointment as the Tibet tourism promotion ambassador. In January 2025, he was invited to be the cultural tourism spokesperson of his hometown, Yueyang.

== Filmography ==
=== Film ===
Year	English title	Chinese title	Role	Notes	Ref.
2019	Deep Water	深水区	Lu Zihao		
2020	The Turning Ferry	隐欲渡口	Siwen Zhang	Short film, credited as Wang Tao	

=== Television series ===
Year	English title	Chinese title	Role	Network	Ref.
2025	Perfect Match	五福临门	Chai An	Hunan Television, Mango TV, Netflix	
2026	Unveil: Jadewind	唐宫奇案之青雾风鸣	Xiao Huaijin	CCTV-8, Youku, Netflix	
TBA	A Love Confession	告白	Zhou Jingze	Hunan Television, Mango TV	

=== Web series ===
Year	English title	Chinese title	Role	Network	Ref.
2020	You Complete Me	小风暴之时间的玫瑰	Gu Xiaobing	Tencent Video	
2021	Song of Youth	玉楼春	A Jiu	Youku	
2021	One and Only	周生如故	Liu Zixing	iQIYI	
2021	Your Sensibility My Destiny	公子倾城	Mo Qingchen /Ji Dinglan	iQIYI	
2022	Delicacies Destiny	珍馐记	Prince Zhu Shoukui	Bilibili, Disney+	
2022	First Love	初次爱你	Ren Chu	iQIYI	
2023	Scent of Time	为有暗香来	Zhong Xiwu	Youku, HBO Max	
2023	Story of Kunning Palace	宁安如梦	Zhang Zhe	iQIYI	
2024	Amidst a Snowstorm of Love	在暴雪时分	Meng Xiaodong	Tencent Video	
2024	The Double	墨雨云间	Xiao Heng	Youku	
2025	The Wanted Detective	定风波	Xiao Beiming	iQIYI	
2025	Shadow Detective	暗影侦探	Guan Cen	iQIYI	
TBA	Love in Red Dust	红尘四合	Yuwen Hongce	iQIYI	
TBA	Just Fight	暴虎	Feng He	iQIYI	
TBA	Chun Ri Yan	春日宴	Jiang Xuan Jin	iQIYI	

=== Theatre ===
Year	English title	Chinese title	Role	Theatre	Ref.
2023	It Doesn't Matter What You Look Like	长什么样不重要	Young Confucius and Shao Zhengmao	National Theatre of China	

=== Variety show ===
Year	English title	Chinese title	Role	Network	Ref.
2023	Racing Youth Season 2	飞驰吧！少年 第二季	Cast member	Mango TV	
2023	As You Wish: Story of Kunning Palace	100万个约定之宁安如梦	Cast member	iQIYI	
2023	Ace vs Ace Season 8	王牌对王牌第八季	Guest	Zhejiang Television	
2023	Duel of Kung Fu	来者何人	Cast member	Mango TV	
2024	Run For Time Season 4	全员加速中 对战季	Guest	Mango TV, Hunan Television	
2024	Wonderland Season 4	五十公里桃花坞 第四季	Cast member	Tencent Video	
2024	Bravo650	团建不能停	Guest	Tencent Video	
2025	Perfect Match: Friendship Sharing	五福临门团综·友福同享	Cast member	Mango TV, Netflix	
2025	Hello, Saturday 2025	你好，星期六 2025	Guest	Mango TV, Hunan Television	
2025	Our Dormitories	我们的宿舍	Guest	Mango TV	
2026	Friday Bee Crazy	周五晚高疯	Guest	Youku	
2026	Divas Hit the Road Season 8	花儿与少年	Cast Member	Mango TV, Hunan Television	

== Awards and nominations ==
Year	Award	Category	Nominated work	Results	Ref.
2022	Star Sea Young Actor Selection Program	Star Sea Young Actor	Delicacies Destiny	Nominated	
2022	6th Golden Bud Network Film and Television Festival	New Force of the Year	One and Only	Won	
2023	9th Wenrong Awards	Top Ten Young Actor Award		Won	
2023	iQIYI Scream Night	Enterprising Actor of the Year	Story of Kunning Palace	Won	
2023	Weibo Vision Conference	Potential Actor of the Year	Scent of Time, Story of Kunning Palace	Won	
2023	Weibo Night	Emerging Artist of the Year		Won	
2024	Television Series of China Quality Ceremony	Quality Charming Actor of the Year	Amidst a Snowstorm of Love	Won	
2024	10th Wenrong Awards	Best Young Actor in a TV Series	The Double	Won	
2024	iQIYI Scream Night	Asia-Pacific Popular Actor of the Year		Won	
2024	Tencent Video All Star Night	Variety Show Popular Star of the Year	Wonderland 4	Won	
2024	Tencent Video All Star Night	Progressive Artist of the Year		Won	
2024	Weibo Night	Most Promising Actor of the Year	The Double	Won	
2025
2025	30th Asian Television Awards	Best Actor in Leading Role	Perfect Match	Nominated	
2026	6th New Era Television Festival	Best Costume Drama Actor	Unveil: Jadewind	Nominated	
