= Summer's Desire (film) =

- Poster
- Chinese: 泡沫之夏
- Directed by: Lai Chun-Yu
- Based on: Summer of Foam by Ming Xiaoxi
- Starring: Cancan Huang; Him Law; Jerry Yan
- Music by: Terdsak Janpan; Bill Piyatut H.
- Production companies: Xianghao Pictures; China Film Group Corporation; Jiangsu Wenhua Dongrun Entertainment; Yantai Media Investment; 37 Wan Shanghai Technology
- Release date: July 21, 2016
- Country: China
- Language: Mandarin
- Box office: CN¥6.3 million

Summer's Desire is a 2016 Chinese romantic drama film directed by Lai Chun-Yu and starring Cancan Huang, Him Law and Jerry Yan. It was released in China on July 21, 2016. It is the second adaptation of Ming Xiaoxi's 2007 novel Summer of Foam and the first feature film adaptation following the 2010 television series version.

A third adaptation was released in 2018.

== Plot ==
Yin Xiamo was attracted to Luo Xi because they were both orphans. However, Yin Xiamo's rich boyfriend Ou Chen sent Luo Xi to UK to separate the two. After a fatal car accident involving Yin Xiamo's adoptive parents, Yin Xiamo blamed everything on Ou Chen, leading him to lose his memory in a car accident. Five years later, Luo Xi became a popular actor and decided to win back Yin Xiamo. Yet, Ou Chen started recovering his memory and eventually remembered Yin Xiamo.

== Cast ==
- Cancan Huang
- Him Law
- Jerry Yan
- Jiu Kong
- Gua Ah-leh

== Reception ==
The film has grossed CN¥6.3 million in China.
