= Zheng Kai (Hangzhou) =

Chinese actor (born 1986)

- 郑凯
- Born: March 11, 1986 (age 40); Hangzhou, Zhejiang, China
- Education: Beijing Film Academy
- Occupation: Actor
- Years active: 2006–present
- Notable work: The Flame's Daughter; Scarlet Heart

Zheng Kai (Chinese: 郑凯, born March 11, 1986) is a Chinese actor known for his roles in television series such as The Flame's Daughter, Scarlet Heart, and The Legend of Xiangxi.

== Early life and education ==
Born in Hangzhou, Zhejiang Province, Zheng showed early talent in sprinting before transitioning to dance during middle school at Hangzhou Art School. He was admitted to Beijing Film Academy's prestigious undergraduate performance program in 2004.

== Filmography ==
=== Television Series ===
Year	Title	Role	Notes
2006	Struggle	Ludidi	
2011	Scarlet Heart	Zoying	
2011	The Legend of Xiangxi	Han Ming	
2012	The Flame's Daughter	Lu Yan	
2013	New Age of Love	Liu Xugang	
2018	Investigation	Wu Zhongming/Wu Boying	
2020	Ancient Detective	Ming Yefeng	
2021	Gold Medal	Liu Zhengguang	
2022	Legacy	Lu Pei	
2023	Left Ear	Zhang Yang	

=== Film ===
Year	Title	Role
2012	For You (2012 film)	Lin De
2015	Worlds Apart (2015 film)	Liang Wenting
2017	Peace Breaker	Xu Bin

== Awards ==
- 2012: Best New Actor - 5th Shanghai College Student TV Festival (Scarlet Heart, The Legend of Xiangxi)
- 2019: Nominated - Best Actor in Modern Drama - 26th Huading Awards (Investigation)
