= The Double (TV series) =

2024 Chinese television series

- Official poster
- Genre: Historical; Romance
- Based on: Marriage of Di Daughter by Qian Shan Cha Ke
- Written by: Ren Yanan; Yang Zhou; Ma Shige
- Directed by: Lv Hao Ji Ji; Bai Yunmo; Ma Shige
- Starring: Wu Jinyan; Wang Xingyue
- Opening theme: "Watching the Snow" by Cyndi Wang
- Ending theme: "Live and Love" by Zhong Chenle
- Country of origin: China
- Original language: Mandarin
- No. of seasons: 1
- No. of episodes: 40+1 bonus

Production
- Producer: Yu Zheng
- Production location: Hengdian World Studios
- Running time: 45 minutes
- Production companies: Youku; Huanyu Film

Original release
- Network: Youku
- Release: June 2 – June 22, 2024

The Double (Chinese: 墨雨云间) is a 2024 Chinese television series based on the web novel Marriage of Di Daughter by Qian Shan Cha Ke. It stars Wu Jinyan and Wang Xingyue in leading roles. The series premiered on Youku on June 2, 2024.

On June 5, 2024, the popularity exceeded 10,000 heat index on Youku, marking the fastest time for a series to reach 10,000 on Youku in 2024. The record was later broken by The Story of Pearl Girl. The series has a 6.9 rating on Douban from over 36,000 users.

== Synopsis ==
Xue Li (Wu Jinyan), the daughter of Magistrate Xue was betrayed and buried alive by her beloved husband, Shen Yurong. Fate gives her a second chance and she manages to survive. She is saved by Jiang Li (Yang Chaoyue), the daughter of Chief Secretariat. However, Jiang Li soon passes away and, before dying, she asks Xue Li to take revenge for her. Xue Li takes on Jiang Li's identity and goes to the capital to seek revenge against those who caused her and Jiang Li's misfortune.

== Cast and characters ==
=== Main ===
- Wu Jinyan as Xue Li / Xue Fangfei / Jiang Li

Only daughter of Magistrate Xue, with the courtesy name Fangfei. She was betrayed and buried alive by her husband, Shen Yurong and his family. However, she manages to survive and is saved by Jiang Li. After Jiang Li's death, she takes on her identity to seek revenge against those who caused her and Jiang Li's misfortunes.

- Wang Xingyue as Xiao Heng
  - Duke Su, a general, close friend and advisor to the Emperor Hong Xiao.
- Liang Yongqi as Shen Yurong
  - Ex-husband of Xue Fangfei.
- Li Meng as Princess Wan Ning
  - Sister of Lord Cheng and half-sister of Emperor Hong Xiao. She has a love affair with Shen Yurong.

=== Supporting ===
Jiang Residence

- Ai Mi as Tong'er

Jiang Li's loyal maid who has stayed by her side for a long time. After Jiang Li's death, she vows to take revenge on the Jiang family and helps Xue Fangfei complete her disguise as Jiang Li.

- Chen Qiao'en as Ji Shuran

Madame of Jiang Family, and Ruoyao and Bing Ji's biological mother. She is the older sister of Consort Li. Ten years before the events of the series, she framed Jiang Li for fratricide and sent her away to Zhennü Hall.

- Su Ke as Jiang Yuanbai

Chief Secretariat and Head of Jiang household. He is the father of Jiang Li, Jiang Ruoyao and Bing Ji.

- Sun Wei as Jiang Yuanping

Master of the second branch of the Jiang family. Lu Shi's husband and Jingrui's father. He is said to be very doting husband.

- Zhang Ding Han as Lu Shi

Jiang Yuaning's wife. Mother of Jingrui.

- He Fengtian as Jiang Jingrui

Older cousin of Jiang Li who supports her in every situation. He loves turtles.

- Liu Xiening as Jiang Ruoyao

Third Young Lady of the Jiang family and Jiang Li's younger half-sister. She is engaged to Zhou Yanbang. Biological daughter of Ji Shuran.

- Chen Yuxian as Jiang Yu'e

Cousin of the Jiang family who is in love with Jiang Ruoyao's fiancé Zhou Yanbang.

- Leanne Liu as Old Madame Jiang

People around Xiao Heng

- Wang Lefu as Lu Ji
- Pan Youcheng as Wen Ji
- Zhao Qing as Situ Jiuyue
  - Zhao Country's Princess. She is an expert in poison. She has a crush on Xiao Heng.
- Yu Rongguang as Xiao Da Chuan

Xiao Heng's grandfather.

Imperial Household

- Zeng Kelang as Emperor Hong Xiao (Zhao Ye)
  - Half siblings with Lord Cheng and Princess Wanning. He is childhood friend with Xiao Heng.
- Sun Jingjing as Concubine Li
  - Younger sister of Ji Shuran. One of Emperor Hong Xiao's favourite consorts.
- Lord Cheng

Li Residence

- Zhang Zheng Yang as Li Zhongnan (Chancellor Li)
  - Secretly works for Lord Cheng and Princess Wanning. He is often going against Jiang Yuanbai in court.
- Wang Ya Chao as Li Jin
  - Li Zhongnan's cunning and manipulative eldest son. He becomes a Prince Consort after being forced to marry Princess Wanning.
- Li Xin Ze as Li Lian
  - Li Zhongnan's second son who is arrogant and impulsive. He is forced to become a monk after losing a bet.

Ye Residence

- Chen Xinhai as Ye Shijie
  - He is the son of the Ye Minghui, the first branch of the Ye family. He is cousins with Ye Jia'er and Jiang Li's. One of the top scholars in their academy and later becomes Vice Director of the Ministry of Revenue.
- He Hongshan as Ye Jia'er
  - She is the daughter of Ye Mingxuan, the second branch of the Ye family. She is cousins with Ye Shijie and Jiang Li. She helps run the Ye family business.
- Xiang Xia as Ye Mingxuan
- Dong Chunhui as Ye Mingyu
  - The youngest sibling amongst the four; Zhenzhen, Minghui, and Mingxuan.
- Dong Xuan as Ye Zhenzhen
  - Jiang Li's biological mother.

Xue Residence

- Yao Zhang as Xue Zhao

Xue Fangfei's younger brother.

- Yang Fu Yu as Hai Tang

Fangfei's maidservant.

Others

- Zhao Jiamin as Liu Xu
- Fan Tiantian as Mother Sun
- Zhang Xiaowan as Yun Shuang
- Guan Le as Xiang Qiao
- Tang Zhenye as Xue Huaiyuan

=== Guest appearances ===
- Yang Chaoyue as Jiang Li

Second Young Lady of the Jiang family. Ye Zhenzhen and Jiang Yuanbai's only daughter. Jiang Li and her maidservant Tong'er were exiled at Zhennü Hall for ten years before meeting Xue Fangfei.

- Wu Jiayi as Qiong Zhi
- Kong Xueer as Zhi Yan

== Soundtrack ==
No.	English title	Chinese title	Artist	Notes
1.	"Watching the Snow"	观雪	Cyndi Wang	Opening theme
2.	"Live and Love"	活下去爱下去	Zhong Chenle	Ending theme
3.	"Lifetime of Wisdom"	一世聪明	Faye	
4.	"Ink Rain Clouds"	墨雨云间	Jing Long, Jing Di	
5.	"Wither"	凋零	Huang Shifu	
6.	"Dang Gui"	当归	Jin Runji, Cui Zige	
7.	"Su Fei Luo Jin Li Hua Bai"	芳菲落尽梨花白	Mi Liang	
8.	"Lifetime of Wisdom"	一世聪明	Cui Zige	
9.	"Ink Rain Clouds"	墨雨云间	Zhou Xuan	

== Awards and nominations ==
Name of the award ceremony, year presented, category, nominee of the award, and the result of the nomination
Award ceremony	Year	Category	Nominee / Work	Result	Ref.
Asia Contents Awards & Global OTT Awards	2024	Best OTT Original	The Double	Nominated	
