= Chen Heyi =

Chinese actor (born 2000)

- Born: October 12, 2000 (age 26); Shijiazhuang, Hebei, China
- Education: Hangzhou Normal University
- Occupation: Actor
- Years active: 2019–present
- Agent: Jiashang Media
- Height: 183 cm (6 ft 0 in)

Chinese name
- Simplified Chinese: 陳鶴一
- Hanyu Pinyin: Chén Hèyī

Chen Heyi (Chinese: 陈鶴一; pinyin: Chén Hèyī, born October 12, 2000) is a Chinese actor. He is best known for his roles in The Princess Royal (2024) and Fated Hearts (2025). He is also well known for his roles in You Are Desire (2023), Warm on a Cold Night (2023) and Perfect Match (2025).

== Filmography ==
=== Television series ===
Year	Title	Role	Notes	Ref.
2019	Arg Life 2	Chen Heyi		
2021	Make My Heart Smile	Mu Ze		
2021	Summer Again	Lin Nanyi		
2021	You Are My Glory	"King of Glory" contestant	Cameo (Ep. 13–14)	
2022	Almost Lover	Su Mingwei		
2023	Warm on a Cold Night	Wen Jun		
2023	Till the End of the Moon	God of Water		
2023	You Are Desire	Fu Mingxiu		
2024	The Princess Royal	Su Rongqing		
2025	Reopen My Journals	Mao Tou		
2025	Perfect Match	Du Yangxi / Yuan Ming		
2025	Feud	Lin Fan		
2025	Fated Hearts	Xia Jingshi		
2026	Blossoms of Power	Xiao Changyu		
TBA	Wan Gu Zui Qiang Zong	Li Qingyang		
TBA	Wanhua Sin			

== Awards and nominations ==
Year	Award	Category	Nominee(s)/Work(s)	Result	Ref.
2024	Weibo TV & Internet Video Summit	Potential Actor of the Year	Chen Heyi	Won	
2025	iQIYI Scream Night	Potential Actor of the Year	Chen Heyi	Won	
2025	Tencent Video Star Awards	Best Newcomer in a Television Series	Chen Heyi	Won	
