= Zhang Xueying =

Chinese actress (born 1997)

- 张雪迎
- Born: June 18, 1997 (age 29); Yiwu, Zhejiang, China
- Education: Yiwu Art School; Bei Jing Haidian Experimental Middle School; National Academy of Chinese Theatre Arts
- Alma mater: Central Academy of Drama
- Occupation: Actress
- Years active: 2003–present
- Height: 1.65 m (5 ft 5 in)

Chinese name
- Traditional Chinese: 張雪迎
- Simplified Chinese: 张雪迎
Transcriptions
Standard Mandarin
- Hanyu Pinyin: Zhāng Xuěyíng

Zhang Xueying (Chinese: 张雪迎; born 18 June 1997), also known as Sophie Zhang, is a Chinese actress. Zhang is regarded as one of the "New Four Dan actresses of the post-95s Generation" (95后四小花旦), along with Zhang Zifeng, Vicky Chen, and Guan Xiaotong.

== Career ==
In 2003, Zhang made her acting debut in the television series, Hero During Yongle Period. She built up her popularity in China with various supporting roles in television series; such as The Romance of the Condor Heroes (2014), The Whirlwind Girl (2015) and Promise of Migratory Birds (2016).

In 2017, Zhang played her first small-screen leading role in When We Were Young, a remake of the South Korean television series Who Are You: School 2015. In 2018, she starred in romance drama Summer's Desire, based on Ming Xiaoxi's novel Pao Mo Zhi Xia.

In 2019, Zhang rose to prominence for her role in the film Einstein and Einstein directed by Cao Baoping, which won her critical acclaim. The same year, Zhang starred in the historical romance drama Princess Silver; and period action drama Hot Blooded Youth.

In 2020, Zhang is set to star in the film Flowers Bloom in the Ashes directed by Chen Kaige.

== Filmography ==
=== Film ===
Year	English title	Chinese title	Role	Notes/Ref.
2006	Winter Fairytale	冬天里的童话	Tingting	
2006	Fearless	霍元甲	Little girl	
2007	Flower And Chess	花与棋	Xiaohai	
2011	Daughter	女儿	Xiaofeng	
2012	Time Flies Soundlessly	岁月无声	Duoduo	
2014	The Great Love of A Policewoman	片警妈妈	Zhang Yumiao	
2015	Lovers & Movies	爱我就陪我看电影	Siyu	
2015	Songs From Battlefields	穿越硝烟的歌声		Cameo
2016	When I Become You	当我成为你	Su Qiaoqiao	
2016	Dream Journey	大梦西游	Yao Yao	
2019	Einstein and Einstein	狗十三	Li Wan	
2020	Flowers Bloom in the Ashes	尘埃里开花		
2024	Burning Stars	孤星计划	Ding Menghua	

=== Television series ===
Year	English title	Chinese title	Role	Network	Notes/Ref.
2004	281 Letters	281封信	Duo Duo	Tianjin TV	
2005	Hero During Yongle Period	永乐英雄儿女	Jin Niang (young)		
2005	Strange Tales of Liao Zhai	新聊斋志异	Xiao Cui	Guangdong Channel	
2005	Fu Gui	福贵	Feng Xia (young)	CCTV	
2005	Daming Qicai	大明奇才	Xiaogu	CCTV	
2006	Kungfu Champion	功夫状元	Xiaoya		
2006	Hong Hai'er	红孩儿	Xiaolongnu	ATV	
2006	Yang Naiwu and Xiao Baicai	杨乃武与小白菜	Xiao Baicai		
2006	Founding Emperor of Ming Dynasty	朱元璋	Qing'er	CCTV	
2007	Da Juyuan	大剧院	Xu Ying (young)		
2007	Powder Purple Ink	粉墨王侯	Ju'er		
2007	The Legend and the Hero	封神榜之凤鸣岐山	Cai Yun	Jilin TV	
2007	Chuan Zheng Feng Yun	船政风云	Ah Xiang (young)	CCTV	
2007	Big Shot	大人物	Sisi	CCTV	
2008	Ning Wei Nu Ren	宁为女人	Yue Bai		
2008	The Legend of the Condor Heroes	射雕英雄传	Little girl	Xiamen Chanel	
2008	Paladins in Troubled Times	大唐游侠传	Hua'er	CCTV	
2008	Red Begonia	红海棠	Qian Shi (young)		
2009	Feng Yatou	疯丫头	Xixi	CCTV	
2009	Rose Martial World	玫瑰江湖2	Shen Siru (young)	Guangdong Channel	
2009	Lurk	潜伏	Little girl	Beijing TV, Chongqing TV, Dragon TV, Heilongjiang TV	
2009	Dad Wake Me Up When It Is Morning	爸爸天亮叫我	Niu'er	Xiamen TV	
2009	Love Blooming	爱·盛开	You Lan	Shenchuan TV	
2010	Beauty's Rival in Palace	美人心计	Princess Guantao (young)	Shanghai Channel	
2010	Detective	女神捕	Ru Yi	CCTV	
2010	Xin An Family	新安家族	Luo Si	CCTV	
2011	A Cheng of Genesis	创世纪风云之阿诚	Jingyi (young)	Anhui TV	
2011	Windmill	风车	Dan Hong (young)	Beijing TV	
2011	I Am Your Son	我是你儿子	Chen Yan		
2012	In Love with Power	山河恋·美人无泪	Consort Donggo	Jiangsu TV	
2013	Swordsman	笑傲江湖	Laobusi	Hunan TV	
2013	Chuan Yue Feng Huo Xian	穿越烽火线	Xiaoying	CCTV	
2014	The Romance of the Condor Heroes	神雕侠侣	Guo Xiang	Hunan TV	
2015	Ancient Mirror	古镜	Shi Jing	Mango TV	
2015	The Whirlwind Girl	旋风少女	Lee Eun-soo	Hunan TV	
2015	Love Yunge from the Desert	大汉情缘之云中歌	Mo Cha	Hunan TV	
2015	Legend of Ban Shu	班淑傳奇	Liu Yan	Tencent	
2016	Legend of Nine Tails Fox	青丘狐传说	Weng Hongting	Hunan TV	
2016	Promise of Migratory Birds	十五年等待候鸟	Han Yichen	Hunan TV	
2016	My Step Father is a Hero	我的继父是偶像	Kang Ni	Nantong Channel	
2017	When We Were Young	青春最好时	Chu Yinyin / Xia'er	Tencent	
2018	Summer's Desire	泡沫之夏	Yin Xiamo	Zhejiang TV	
2019	Princess Silver	白发	Rong Le (Man Yao)	iQiyi, Tencent, Youku	
2019	Hot Blooded Youth	热血少年	Jia Hongyi	iQiyi	
2021	Once Given, Never Forgotten	你的名字我的姓氏	Lianxin	iQiyi, Tencent	
2022	Go! Beach Volleyball Girls	燃！沙排少女	Li Guoduo	Tencent	

== Discography ==
=== Singles ===
Year	English title	Chinese title	Album	Notes/Ref.
2018	"Qing Piao Diao"	清平调	Everlasting Classics	

=== Soundtrack appearances ===
Year	English title	Chinese title	Album	Notes/Ref.
2018	"Saved By You"	被你拯救的我	Summer's Desire OST	
2019	"Forget Worries"	忘忧	Princess Silver OST	

=== Other appearances ===
Year	English title	Chinese title	Notes/Ref.
2018	"Qiang Guo Yi Dai You Wo Zai"	强国一代有我在	Promotional song for CCYL
2019	"Starry Sea"	星辰大海	For China Movie Channel Young Actors Project with 31 other actors

== Awards and nominations ==
Year	Award	Category	Nominated work	Result	Ref.
2017	Chinese Communist Youth League (CCYL)	"May 4th Medal"	—N/a	Won	
2017	ifeng Fashion Choice Awards	Most Popular Actress	—N/a	Won	
2017	Baidu Records Press Conference	Most Promising Actress	—N/a	Won	
2017	Sina Best Taste Fashion Awards	Most Capable Idol	—N/a	Won	
2018	Chic Style Awards	Female Idol of the Year	—N/a	Won	
2019	25th Huading Awards	Best Newcomer	Einstein and Einstein	Nominated	
2019	6th The Actors of China Award Ceremony	Best Actress (Web series)	Princess Silver	Nominated	
2019	Golden Bud - The Fourth Network Film And Television Festival	Best Actress	Princess Silver, Hot Blooded Youth	Nominated	
