= Delicacies Destiny =

Chinese streaming television series

- Chinese: 珍馐记
- Genre: Period drama; Romantic comedy
- Written by: Qi Yueli; Pan Xin
- Directed by: Hao Guo
- Starring: Wang Xingyue; He Ruixian
- Composers: Li Han; Lu Hu
- Country of origin: Mainland China
- Original language: Mandarin
- No. of episodes: 17 (Mainland China: 16)

Production
- Executive producer: Ma Tian
- Producer: Yang Le
- Cinematography: Chen Kai
- Editor: Liu Xiang
- Running time: 27–51 minutes
- Production company: Huanyu Film and Television

Original release
- Network: Bilibili (China); Disney+ (worldwide)
- Release: April 7 – May 2, 2022

Delicacies Destiny (Chinese: 珍馐记) is a Chinese television series produced by Huanyu Film and Television. The series premiered in Mainland China on Bilibili on April 7, 2022. Internationally, the series is available on Disney+ in selected countries.

== Plot ==
The plot centres on the young and talented cook Ling Xiaoxiao. The crown prince of the imperial palace, Zhu Shoukui, begins to take an interest in her and grants her a position at court. But in a scheming and begrudging environment, it is not easy for Ling to hold her own.

== Cast ==
- He Ruixian as Ling Xiaoxiao
  - Lv Chenyue as young Ling Xiaoxiao
- Wang Xingyue as Crown prince Zhu Shoukui
  - Anson Shi as young Crown prince Zhu Shoukui
- Pan Binlong as Emperor
- Liu Min as Empress
- Ji Jiahe as Concubine Li
- Zang Hongna as Mingmei
- Guan Le as Xiyan
- Ennazhuli as Chunchan
- Feng Man as Prince Jin
  - Wang Yikun as young Prince Jin
- Lou Zibo as Prince An
  - Jin Xuze as young Prince An
- Bu Guangjin as Jiang Yunnuo
- Xiang Xia as Zheng Li
- Liu Beishi as Lu Yunzhou
- Gua Tong as Shen Yitao
- Zhang Lei as Guan Yidao
- Wang Yu as Gao Zicheng
- Jiang Yutao as Chancellor Li
- Tong Yao as Leyao
- Zhang Tingting as Madame Gu
- Zhang Hongbin as Eunuch Fu
- Zhang Gong as Jiang Tao
- Wang Longxin as Songbai
- Jackie Li as Princess
- Zhou Dawei as Consort
- Chen Hongan as Medical attendant
- Di Sun as Wang
- Liu Guhao as Chen Yongkang

== Episodes ==
No. overall	No. in season	Title	Original release date
1	1	"Episode 1" "第1集"	April 7, 2022
2	2	"Episode 2" "第2集"	April 7, 2022
3	3	"Episode 3" "第3集"	April 7, 2022
4	4	"Episode 4" "第4集"	April 14, 2022
5	5	"Episode 5" "第5集"	April 14, 2022
6	6	"Episode 6" "第6集"	April 14, 2022
7	7	"Episode 7" "第7集"	April 21, 2022
8	8	"Episode 8" "第8集"	April 21, 2022
9	9	"Episode 9" "第9集"	April 21, 2022
10	10	"Episode 10" "第10集"	April 28, 2022
11	11	"Episode 11" "第11集"	April 28, 2022
12	12	"Episode 12" "第12集"	April 28, 2022
13	13	"Episode 13" "第13集"	May 2, 2022
14	14	"Episode 14" "第14集"	May 2, 2022
15	15	"Episode 15" "第15集"	May 2, 2022
16	16	"Episode 16" "第16集"	May 2, 2022
17	17	"Alternate Ending" "另類結局"	May 2, 2022
