= Summer's Desire (2018 TV series) =

- Promotional image
- Chinese: 泡沫之夏
- Hanyu Pinyin: Pàomò Zhī Xià
- Genre: Romance
- Based on: Summer of Foam by Ming Xiaoxi
- Written by: Ming Xiaoxi; Li Tian; Jia Binbin
- Directed by: Yu Zhongzhong
- Starring: Zhang Xueying; Qin Junjie; Madina Memet; Huang Shengchi
- Opening theme: "There is No Mistake in Our Love" by Hu Xia
- Ending theme: "I'm Saved By You" by Zhang Xueying
- Country of origin: China
- Original language: Mandarin
- No. of seasons: 1
- No. of episodes: 36

Production
- Production companies: iQiyi; Youhug Media

Original release
- Network: Zhejiang Television
- Release: 8 May 2018 – June 2018

Related
- Summer's Desire (2010 TV series)

Summer's Desire (Chinese: 泡沫之夏; lit. 'Summer of Foam') is a 2018 Chinese romance television series directed by Yu Zhongzhong and co-produced by iQiyi and Youhug Media. It is based on the 2007 novel Summer of Foam by Ming Xiaoxi, and the third adaptation following the 2010 television series version and the 2016 film version. It stars Zhang Xueying, Qin Junjie, Madina Memet and Huang Shengchi. The series is premiered on Zhejiang Television in China on 8 May 2018. The series centres on the love story of Yin Xiamo, Ou Chen and Luo Xi.

== Synopsis ==
Yin Xiamo (Zhang Xueying) becomes an orphan during her childhood. She pursues her acting career and takes care of her sick younger brother at the same time. She signs up with an entertainment company and won the second place in a selection contest. She rose to fame after releasing her debut solo album. She is discovered by Ou Chen (Qin Junjie), the co-founder of Oushi Group, a game company. She stars in a television series produced by Oushi Group, which received critical and popular acclaim. However, in the fierce market competition, the company has encountered operational difficulties. On the verge of bankruptcy, they go through the difficulties together and finally achieves the cause of both sides, and also gains a happy love.

== Cast ==
=== Main ===
- Zhang Xueying as Yin Xiamo, an actress who met Ou Chen during her childhood before she lost her parents.
  - Lü Chenyue as young Yin Xiamo.
- Qin Junjie as Ou Chen, the co-founder of Oushi Group, a game company.
  - Wen Chundi as young Ou Chen.
- Huang Shengchi as Luo Xi, an orphan who loves Yin Xiamo.
- Madina Memet as Shen Qiang, an Asian superstar who loves Luo Xi.

=== Supporting ===
- Chen Xinyu as Yao Shu'er, the senior sister apprentice of Yin Xiamo.
- Huang Deyi as Yin Cheng, Yin Xiamo's younger brother.
- Yuan Ziyun as Zhen En, Yin Xiamo's close friend.
- Song Haijie as Dai Wei (David), Ou Chen's partner.
- Liu Jia as Fang Jinhua
- Zhu Xiangyang as Song Yamin
- Li Yinan as Xi Meng (Simon)
- Xie Xintong as Pan Nan, Yin Xiamo's friend.
- Ding Ke'er as Lin Kexin
- Duan Ziyi as Wei Yin
- Wang Yijia as Jie Ni (Jenny), the broker of Luo Xi.

== Soundtrack ==
No.	Title	Lyrics	Music	Singer(s)	Length
1.	"There is No Mistake in Our Love (我们的爱没有错)" (Opening theme)	Dai Yuedong	Vanros Kloud	Hu Xia
2.	"I'm Saved By You (被你拯救的我)" (Ending theme)	Chen Hongyu	Vanros Kloud	Zhang Xueying
3.	"Desert (沙漠)" (Theme)	Chen Huan	Chen Huan	Jocie Kok
4.	"Black Cat and Milk (黑猫牛奶)" (Interlude)	Shen	Vanros Kloud	Huang Shengchi/ Su Dan/ Da Shengjun

== Production ==
Production started in July 2017 in Suzhou and ended in Sanya in October of the same year.

== Ratings ==
Zhejiang TV CSM52 city ratings
Air date	Episode #	Ratings	Audience share
8 May 2018	1-2	0.315%	2.224%
9 May 2018	3-4	0.338%	2.469%
10 May 2018	5-6	0.437%	3.098%
15 May 2018	7-8	0.533%	3.82%
16 May 2018	9-10	0.556%	3.963%
17 May 2018	11-12	0.547%	3.837%
22 May 2018	13-14	0.518%	3.793%
23 May 2018	15-16	0.53%	3.837%
24 May 2018	17-18	0.537%	3.823%
29 May 2018	19-20	0.462%	3.291%
30 May 2018	21-22	0.495%	3.470%
31 May 2018	23-24	0.556%	3.848%
5 June 2018	25-26	0.476%	3.359%
6 June 2018	27-28	0.507%	3.727%
7 June 2018	29-30	0.511%	3.728%
12 June 2018	31-32	0.465%	3.370%
13 June 2018	33-34	0.597%	4.4174%
14 June 2018	35-36	0.656%	3.927%

- Highest ratings are marked in red, lowest ratings are marked in blue

== Awards and nominations ==
Award	Category	Nominated work	Result	Ref.
Golden Bud - The Third Network Film And Television Festival	Top 10 Web Drama	Summer's Desire	Won	

== Broadcast ==
Television	Reign/ Country	Date	Time	Notes
iQiyi	mainland China	8 May 2018	22:00 from Tuesday to Thursday	
Zhejiang Television	mainland China	8 May 2018	22:00 to 23:30 from Tuesday to Thursday	
iQiyi in Taiwan	Taiwan	8 May 2018		
Shuang Xing	Malaysia	21 May 2018	18:00 to 19:00 from Monday to Friday	
Channel 9 MCOT HD (30)	Thailand	28 Jul - 28 Oct 2020 (Wednesday, August 12 And October 13; No Broadcasting)	23:05 to 00:00 from Monday, Tuesday and Wednesday	
