= Zhao Qing (actress) =

Chinese actress (born 2000)

- Born: August 4, 2000 (age 25); Heilongjiang, China
- Education: Communication University of Zhejiang
- Occupation: Actress
- Years active: 2021–present
- Agent: Huanyu Entertainment
- Height: 170 cm (5 ft 7 in)

Chinese name
- Simplified Chinese: 赵晴

Zhao Qing (Chinese: 赵晴, born August 4, 2000), is a Chinese actress under Huanyu Entertainment. She is best known for her role as Mu Yao in Scent of Time (2023).

== Early life and education ==
Zhao Qing was born on August 4, 2000, in Heilongjiang, China. She graduated from Communication University of Zhejiang.

== Filmography ==
=== Television series ===
Year	Title	Role	Ref.
2021	Palace: Devious Women	Shu Miao / Su Miao	
2021	Magic Grocery Store	Xiao Qi	
2022	Don't Mess With Ex-Girlfriend	An Duoduo	
2023	Hi Producer	Consort Zhen	
2023	Gone With the Rain	Li Chun	
2023	Only Love You	Jin Se	
2023	The Princess's New Clothes	Long Mengli	
2023	Scent of Time	Mu Yao	
2023	Beauty Killer	Lu Huaishuang	
2024	The Double	Situ Jiuyue	
2024	Dawn Amidst Hidden Clouds	Lan Che / Leng Qingyao	
2024	Almost Delicious	Fang Meng	
2025	Perfect Match	Chun Lai	
2025	Feud	Shi Hua	
2025	The Immortal Ascension	Mo Caihuan	
2026	Unveil: Jadewind	Wu Ren	
2026	Seeds of Scarlet Longing	Jiang Zhu	
TBA	Zhao Yang Hua Guan	Hua Chi	
TBA	Les Belles	Zhou Yangling	
TBA	Shadows of Desire	Shen Qingwu	
TBA	Blossom through the Cloud	Zheng Youan	

== Awards and nominations ==
Year	Award	Category	Nominee(s)/Work(s)	Result	Ref.
2025	iQIYI Scream Night	Potential Actor of the Year	Zhao Qing	Won	
2025	Wenrong Awards	Breakthrough Young Actor of the Year	Zhao Qing	Won	
