= Winter Begonia =

- Promotional image
- Also known as: Temple Sides are not Begonia Red; 鬓边不是海棠红

Chinese name
- Traditional Chinese: 鬢邊不是海棠紅
- Simplified Chinese: 鬓边不是海棠红
Transcriptions
Standard Mandarin
- Hanyu Pinyin: Bin Biān Bushì Hǎitánghóng
- Genre: Historical fiction War
- Created by: Shui Ru Tian Er
- Based on: Temple Sides are not Begonia Red
- Written by: Shui Ru Tian Er; Yu Zhou; Jiu Ren
- Directed by: Hui Kaidong
- Starring: Huang Xiaoming; Yin Zheng; Charmaine Sheh
- Theme music composer: Lu Hu
- Opening theme: "Winter Begonia (鬓边不是海棠红)" by Lu Hu
- Ending theme: "This Life (此生)" by Xin
- Country of origin: China
- Original language: Mandarin
- No. of episodes: 49

Production
- Executive producers: Yu Zheng; Dai Ying
- Producers: Ma Tian; Wang Xiaohui; Yang Le
- Production locations: Mainland China; Hengdian Studios
- Cinematography: Peng Zhen
- Running time: 45 minutes
- Production companies: Huan Yu Film and Television; Jumo Film and Television

Original release
- Network: iQiyi
- Release: March 20 – May 5, 2020

Winter Begonia (Chinese: 鬓边不是海棠红; pinyin: Bìn Biān Bùshì Hǎitánghóng) is a 2020 Chinese television series starring Huang Xiaoming, Yin Zheng, and Charmaine Sheh, based on Shui Ru Tian Er's BL web novel of the same name. It aired exclusively on iQiyi and tells the story of the close relationship between a shrewd businessman and a Peking opera genius right before the World War II. While the original web novel depicted the relationship between the two main men as romantic, the adaptation changed this depiction into a "bromance".

The show has been praised for its story, visuals and tasteful promotion of Chinese traditional culture, particularly Peking opera. iQiyi released a talk show named Wang Peiyu Peking Opera Show alongside the drama, which features Peking opera performer Wang Peiyu as she elaborates about operatic repertoire/traditions found in Winter Begonia and in real life.

The series began airing on August 7 on Beijing TV at 19:30 CST.

== Synopsis ==
In 1930s Beijing, Shang Xirui (Yin Zheng) is a famous Peking opera dan performer known for his talent and passion for his art. He meets Cheng Fengtai (Huang Xiaoming), a businessman who saves him from an unruly audience during a performance. Cheng becomes interested in Peking opera and the two men become close. Together, they overcome many obstacles including the objection of Fengtai's wife (Charmaine Sheh), and must struggle to preserve their art in the face of the approaching Japanese occupation.

== Cast ==
=== Main ===
- Huang Xiaoming as Cheng Fengtai, a businessman
- Yin Zheng as Shang Xirui, an opera performer
- Charmaine Sheh as Fan Xianger, Fengtai's wife

=== Supporting ===
- Tan Jianci as Chen Renxiang
- Merxat as Fan Lian
- Tang Zengcao as Cao Guixiu
- Liu Min as Cheng Meixin
- Huang Shengyi as Gu Dali
- Li Zefeng as Du Qi
- Chin Shih-chieh as Jiang Rongshou
- Du Chun as Yuan Xiaodi
- Bai Bing as Jiang Mengping
- Li Chunai as Xiao Lai
- Wang Xichao as Jiang Dengbao
- Ma Su as Yue Liang
- Anna Fang as Shi Jiu
- Tang Jingmei as Ceng Aiyu
- Zhang Yixi as Cha Chaer
- Huang Xingyou as Zhou Xiangyun
- Cheng Feng as Xue Qianshan
- Chi Shuai as Chang Zhixin
- Wang Maolei as Shang Juzhen
- Li Yixiao as Cheng Mu
- Hei Zi as Cao Siling
- Michelle Yim as Lao Fujin
- Gao Yu'er as Yu Qing
- Hou Yansong as Liu Hanyu
- Zhang Gongshi as Wang Qi
- Lei Han as Ning Jiulang
- Wen Haibo as Chairman Zheng
- Liu Boxiao as Lao Ge
- Sun Di as Si Xi'er
- Zhang Tianyun as Chun Xing
- Shen Baoping as Hou Yukui

== Production ==
=== Shooting ===
The previous 55 episodes were shortened to 49 in June 2018. Shooting began on December 13, 2018 at Hengdian World Studios. Principal photography ended on April 29, 2019, and entered post-production.

=== Peking opera depictions ===
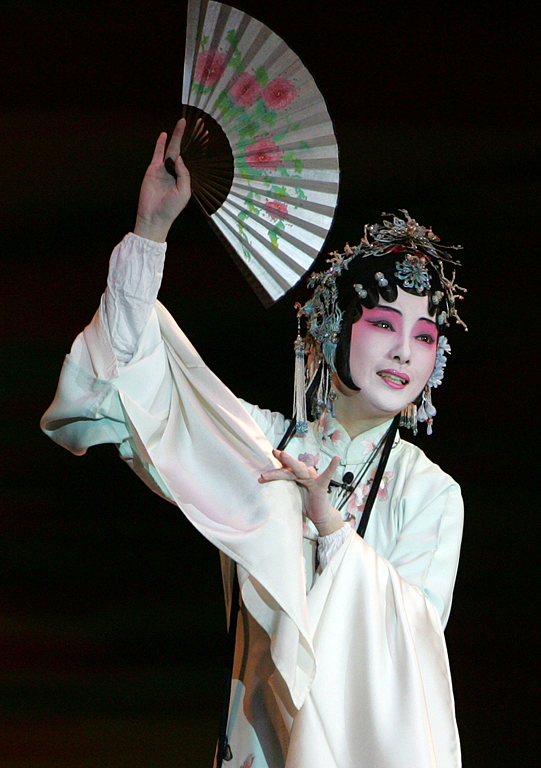
The character Shang Xirui is a dan specialist, as pictured above.

To accurately depict the traditions of Peking opera on the small screen, production brought in experts of the craft to train the actors. The crew also invited 90-year old Peking Opera performing artist Bi Guyun as a drama consultant. Yin Zheng also received one month of closed training from the master. The crew also invited practitioners of specific styles of Peking opera, such as Hui opera, to direct the plays that are performed in the drama. As there were many scenes featuring Kunqu opera, it is reported that two Kunqu opera directors were needed.

=== Sets and costumes ===
The two theaters featured were one-on-one reconstructions of Beijing-Guangzhou Hall and Hu Guang Hall. The Cheng Fu Pavilion and Shui Yun Tower were also completely built by production, necessitating around 20,000 square meters.

More than 200 sets of costumes were used in the drama, with more than 100 of them customized by the production team. The Peking make-up and hairstyle on actors were also supervised by professional opera teachers. Art design was headed by Luan Hexin, while clothing design was headed by Song Xiaotao and Li Anqi. Li Xiaoli was in charge of makeup.

== Original soundtrack ==
Winter Begonia Original Soundtrack (OST)

Soundtrack album by Various artists
- Released: March 19, 2020
- Genres: Mandopop; Ballad
- Language: Mandarin
- Label: Dongyang Huanyu Film

Winter Begonia Original Soundtrack was compiled and released on March 19, 2020 as an extended play.

No.	Title	Lyrics	Music	Singers	Length
1.	"Winter Begonia (鬓边不是海棠红)" (Opening theme song )	Yu Zheng	Lu Hu	Lu Hu	4:49
2.	"This Life (此生)" (Ending theme song)	Yu Zheng	Lu Hu	Xin	4:09
3.	"This Life at this Time (此生此时)"	Yu Zheng	Wang Yaoguang	Wang Yizhe	4:39
4.	"Begonia (海棠)" (Hong Kong title song)	Yang Xi	Zhang Jiacheng	Zhen Junhong

== Reception ==
Winter Begonia has been well received by viewers and critics. Its first 12 episodes debuted with a 7.3 out of 10 on Douban. By its conclusion, the show subsequently rose to an 8.1, aggregated by over 100,000 user reviews. The series reportedly went viral on Sina Weibo, in which the show's hashtag received 480 million clicks.

Beijing Youth Entertainment praised Huang Xiaoming and Yin Zheng's acting as well as the drama's depiction of Peking opera, highlighting it as an example of the potential for film and television to help spread traditional Chinese art and culture. People's Entertainment praised the show's visuals and the interesting depiction of female characters and their relationships.

== Award and nominations ==
Award	Category	Nominee	Result	ref.
26th Shanghai Television Festival	Best Television Series	Winter Begonia	Nominated	
26th Shanghai Television Festival	Best Adapted Screenplay	Yu Zhou, Shui Ru Tian'er, Jiu Ren	Nominated	
26th Shanghai Television Festival	Best Cinematography	Wang Chengxin	Nominated	
26th Shanghai Television Festival	Best Art Direction	Luan Hexin	Nominated	
