= Liang Yongqi (actor) =

Chinese actor (born 1995)

- Born: Liang Qishun; June 25, 1995 (age 31); Haikou, Hainan, China
- Education: Central Academy of Drama
- Occupation: Actor
- Years active: 2020–present
- Agent: Huanyu Film
- Height: 179 cm (5 ft 10 1/2 in)

Chinese name
- Simplified Chinese: 梁永棋
- Hanyu Pinyin: Liáng Yǒngqí

Liang Qishun (Chinese: 梁祺顺, born June 25, 1995), professionally known as Liang Yongqi (Chinese: 梁永棋), is a Chinese actor. He gained popularity for his role as Shen Yurong in The Double (2024).

== Filmography ==
=== Films ===
Year	Title	Role
2024	Suspect	Kai Wen
2024	Fights Break Sphere 3	Wu Hao
2024	Nostalgia	Qing Yun
2025	Fights Break Sphere 4	Wu Hao

=== Television series ===
Year	Title	Role	Notes	Ref.
2020	Girls Have Talent	Jun Lou		
2020	The Powerful Prince	Wei Shu		
2020	Black Lighthouse	Xu Yao's assistant		
2024	The Double	Shen Yurong		
2024	Under the Skin Season 2	Huang Tao		
2025	Perfect Match	Shen Huizhao / Jing Wei		
2025	Feud	Li Mo		
2026	The Empire as a Betrothal	Yin Qing		
TBA	Chasing Dreams	Chu Zhongxu		
TBA	Those Flowers	Han Zhiyu		

== Awards and nominations ==
Year	Award	Category	Nominee(s)/Work(s)	Result	Ref.
2024	Weibo TV & Internet Video Summit	Potential Actor of the Year	Liang Yongqi	Won	
2024	Wenrong Awards	Potential Actor of the Year	Liang Yongqi	Won	
