= Royal Feast =

2022 Chinese historical drama

- Official poster
- 尚食
- Genre: Culinary, Historical Fiction
- Written by: Zhou Mo
- Directed by: Wang Wei, Bai Yunmo
- Opening theme: Royal Feast by Lu Hu
- Ending theme: Taste by Wang Yi Zhe
- Composer: Lu Hu
- Country of origin: Mainland China
- Original language: Mandarin
- No. of seasons: 1
- No. of episodes: 40

Production
- Producers: Yang Le, Producer Ren Xu, Martin, Tao Yong, Jiang Zhifang
- Production location: Hengdian World Studios
- Cinematography: Liu Rui, Cao Yanliang
- Editor: Liu Xiang
- Production companies: Mango TV, Huanyu Film and Television, Zhihe Film and Television

Original release
- Network: Mango TV, Hunan TV
- Release: 22 February 2022

Royal Feast (Chinese: 尚食; pinyin: Shàng Shí) is a historical costume drama series directed by Wang Wei and Bai Yunmo, starring Xu Kai, Wu Jinyan and Wang Churan in main roles. The drama tells the inspirational emotional story of Yao Zijin, a girl who was selected as the maid of the Shangshi Bureau, during the Yongle period in the Ming Dynasty. The drama was broadcast on Mango TV on February 22, 2022.

== Synopsis ==
Yao Zijin, a young girl, during the Ming dynasty under the rule of Emperor Yongle, enters the palace to become a maid in "Food Bureau" department. She gains in her ranks and encounters romantic entanglements during her stay. She gets the task of delivering meals for the Emperor’s grandson, Zhanji, during this time they develop a connection. However, Zijin has a mysterious background that she wants to keep hidden, and her principles make her hesitant to enter into a romantic relationship with Zhanji.

The Food Bureau is part of a complex web of plots, ambitions and politics. When Zijin's background becomes known she becomes a target for those who feel threatened. Meanwhile, Zhanji has to protect his father and fend off moves by his uncles to grab the throne. Along with emotional, the story shows the historical achievements and life of the three outstanding emperors in the Ming Dynasty, and paints a picture of ancient cultural life full of strong family, friendship and love. It advocates that "food" is the bridge that promotes communication between people and different cultures.

== Cast and characters ==
=== Main cast ===
- Xu Kai as Zhu Zhanji, Xuande Emperor of Ming

He has both civil and military skills, as well as wisdom and courage. He is especially good at poetry, calligraphy, painting, and playing the guqin. His character is a respectable, well-rounded man loved by the emperor and respected by the court and the public.

- Wu Jinyan as Yao Zijin, Empress Sun

A well-born folk girl, when she was a teenager, she met Zhu Zhanji, who visited the farmhouse unannounced with Zhu Di. After entering the Shangshi Bureau, she began to understand the real way of drinking and writing and met Zhu Zhanji.

- Wang Churan as Su Yuehua

The cold and proud female official of the Shang Food Bureau, came from a family of famous chefs; her biological mother left her without saying goodbye when she was a child, which brought her a lifetime of confusion. When she became an adult, she entered the palace in order to find her mother. She is also quite proud and competes with Zijin and Yin Ziping for the position of Shangshi in the Ming Dynasty.

- Wang Yizhe as You Yifan

The cynical guard, You Yifan is handsome, cruel, and rebellious. He was promoted because of his great success in rescue and driving. He became the youngest Jinyi guard commander in the Ming Dynasty. He acted both righteously and evilly. Fear, on the surface, he is friendly with Zhu Zhanji, but in fact hides many secrets.

- Zhang Nan as Hu Shanxiang, Empress Hu

Zhu Zhanji's first empress. Her nature is virtuous, her demeanor is solemn, she is quite famous. In the name of Xian, the imperial concubine was born with auspiciousness and was chosen as the concubine. She has no children, because she only gave birth to two princesses, and she is not favored. She was ordered by Emperor Xuanzong to resign as Empress Hu on the grounds that Empress Hu had no children and was ill. She was deposed as a Taoist nun in Chang'an Palace and given the title of Immortal Master Jingci. On the first day of March of the same year, Xuanzong changed his concubine Sun as the empress.

- He Ruixian as Yin Ziping

The Yin family has been discriminated against from generation to generation since they were classified as beggar households from Zhang Shicheng's former clan during the Hongwu period. She never admits defeat, learns the art of cooking, and uses all her powers to enter the palace under false pretenses, trying to compete for the position of Shangshi in the Ming Dynasty, and completely change her destiny. From a humble background, she yearns for fame and status most in her life. With her cooking skills and deep scheming, she is able to navigate the treacherous palace with ease. I thought that power could help me realize my dreams, but I almost lost myself in power.

- He Fengtian as Yuan Qi

The confidant of the grandson Zhu Zhanji, who is the same as Chen Wu, is trusted because he grew up with the grandson, but he is neglected in political affairs, so he is full of jealousy towards Chen Wu. He is especially good at flattering those around him. He is loyal to Zhu Zhanji, but also greedy for money and unscrupulous. He is a figure that everyone in the palace fears.

- Liu Min as Empress Zhang

Zhang's father, Zhang Qi, was the commander of Jingwei and a hero of the founding of the country. She is respectful, docile, smart and decisive, not only has the ability to recognize people and break things, but also is very brave and resourceful, and is deeply loved by Zhu Di and Xu. She has protected her husband and son in crisis many times. She is an outstanding female politician and a daughter-in-law that even Zhu Di has to respect.

- Wang Yan as Meng Ziyun

Su Yuehua's biological mother is a top expert in cooking. He was expelled from the clan for refusing to rape and beating relatives, although he was exempted from punishment. The last one managed to suppress the famous chefs of Guanglu Temple and Shangshan Superintendent and became the noblest food in the Ming Dynasty.

=== Supporting cast ===
- Wang Keru as Wu Miaoxian

Zhu Zhanji's concubine, Wu Cairen later Wu Zhaoyi. She looks innocent and lovely on the surface, but she is actually a scorpion-hearted person and has a place in the palace. She opposes Yao Zijin, and often goes to the Queen Mother to tell right and wrong and sow discord between Yao Zijin and the concubines of various palaces. However, Zhu Zhanji was deceived and thought it was the hand of Queen Hu, but she was found out and demoted by Zhu Zhanji.

- Lian Lian as Wang Yaoqing

The palace chef, who was born with a mean mouth, always punished the little palace maid with the most severe means and was the most feared hell teacher. In fact, she is well aware of the ruthlessness of court life and has always used her own methods to carefully protect the group of little palace maids who have just entered the palace.

- Yu Rongguang as Zhu Di, Yongle Emperor of Ming

The 60-year-old generation of heroes has created a prosperous and stable Yongle era. In his later years, he suspected that the prince was extremely fond of Shengsun, and occasionally had a childish side. Always fearful of death and tantrums, is actually a gourmet extreme lover of hidden attributes.

- Hong Jiantao as Zhu Gaochi, Hongxi Emperor of Ming

The elegant and gentle prince, with a personality like the soft moonlight, always scrutinized the Ming Dynasty's government, allowing the people to rest and recuperate, and was deeply respected and loved by all officials, but because he could not resist the temptation of delicious food, he was obese, and he was not good at riding. The Sacred Heart has been repeatedly ostracized by two brothers.

- Zhang Zhixi as Hu Shanwei, Directress Hu

The eldest sister of Hu Shanxiang, helped the younger sister Hu Shanxiang to create auspiciousness and seized the position of the concubine for the Hu family. In order to pursue the coveted position of Shang Shi, you can never marry for life, and you can work hard to defeat all competitors at all costs.

- Wang Yu as Zhu Gaosui

Gentle and elegant, good at Danqing, the eldest prince has no plans for power and status on the surface. He sincerely assists the two brothers. In fact, he has the deepest ambition.

== Production ==
=== Creative Team ===
The main cast of "Story of Yanxi Palace" and "The Sideburns Are Not Begonia Red" remained same. A professional food production and filming team is specially invited, who aimed on presenting more than 600 kinds of Chinese food within the series. They wanted to create the fine costumes and professional foods, to produce quality series.

=== Shooting Process ===
On October 15, 2020, the series aired in Hengdian Film and Television City, Zhejiang. On February 5, 2021, the series was officially completed.

=== Production ===
Role	Company name
Produced	Hunan Happy Sunshine Interactive Entertainment Media Co., Ltd.
Produced	Dongyang Huanyu Film and Television Culture Co., Ltd.
Produced	Dongyang Zhihe Film and Television Culture Media Co., Ltd.
Contract	Dongyang Huanyu Film and Television Culture Co., Ltd.
Filmography	Dongyang Huanyu Film and Television Culture Co., Ltd.
Information network dissemination right	Hunan Happy Sunshine Interactive Entertainment Media Co., Ltd.

== Broadcast Information ==
On 19 February 2022, the show released a group portrait version, on 21 February, it released an extra-long version of the series. On 22 February, the main visual posters released in red wall version, the single-player and the emotional side yet sweet and sadistic version. On 27 February, the series celebrated its broadcast volume breaking 400M in viewership.

== Soundtrack ==
Title	Lyrics	Composition	Singer	Notes	Ref
Royal Feast	Yu Zheng	Lu Hu	Lu Hu	Opening Theme song	
Taste	Yu Zheng	Lu Hu	Wang Yi Zhe	Ending Theme song	

== Critical Reviews ==
Although "Shangshi" has lost the flashy coat of "Shuang drama", and has lost the "I will pay back ten times if anyone commits a crime", it still follows the old way of fighting monsters and upgrading: one episode solves the emperor's dietary crisis; two The episode presented a secret recipe, which won the attention of the emperor's grandson; in the three episodes, he helped the sisters escape from danger, and cleverly cooked the prince's vegetarian food, which attracted Jin Yiwei's admiration. However, whether "Chinese cuisine + inspirational heroine" can pass the test depends on whether the follow-up plot and performance are stretched ("Wen Wei Po" review).

The female character setting in "Shangshi" deliberately broke the image of "female competition" in the past court dramas. It has to be said that in a certain sense, it is also to the audience's preference, showing the values of women in the 20th century. The play is not careless in terms of historical textual research such as serving Hua Dao. Many netizens who are familiar with the history of the Ming Dynasty "picked" out that many details of the play follow historical records as much as possible. As an "ancient food show", the delicacies put on the table in each episode are also very moving. In the play, a "child-mother meeting" with steamed pigeons and pigeon eggs as the main materials is used to evoke Zhu Di's memory of the queen, so that he can remember the affectionate mother and son, and no longer challenge the prince. Highlights ("Wen Wei Po" review).

== Awards and nominations ==
Year	Award	Category	Nominated work	Result	Ref
2022	The 32nd Zhejiang TV "Peony Award"	Outstanding TV Drama Award	Royal Feast	Won	
