= Rob Moore (executive) =

American film studio executive

- Education: Bachelor's degree in accounting
- Alma mater: Pepperdine University
- Occupation: Entertainment Executive

Rob Moore is an investor in esports and currently is the CEO of Sentinels. He previously was the Vice Chairman of Paramount Pictures, America's largest Hollywood film and television production/distribution company where he oversaw the following divisions: marketing, distribution, home entertainment, digital, interactive, television, licensing and business affairs.

== Education ==
Rob Moore attended Pepperdine University and graduated with cum laude honors in 1984. He received a Bachelor of Science degree in Accounting.

== Career ==
Moore worked at The Walt Disney Company for a period of 13 years from 1987 through 2000. Moore first served as a Senior Financial Analyst and was later appointed Executive Vice President of Finance and Operations. He was responsible for the following business and operating activities: live action film, feature animation, television animation, theatrical marketing and distribution, video marketing and distribution, music operations, stage play business and Miramax Films. While at Disney, Moore helped to facilitate a partnership between the company and Pixar.

In 2000, Moore joined American production company Revolution Studios, supervising business affairs, finance, production and operations. He was one of four partners at the newly formed company, where he headed international and home-video distribution.

Moore later joined Paramount in 2005 as President of Worldwide Marketing, Distribution and Operations. In 2006, he became President of Worldwide Marketing, Distribution and Home Entertainment. He was promoted to Vice Chairman in 2008.

During Moore's tenure at Paramount, the studio produced and distributed commercial hit film franchises including, Transformers, Mission: Impossible, and Star Trek. Moore was responsible for overseeing the campaigns for Marvel Studios' Iron Man, Thor, and Captain America. He was also instrumental in forming strategic partnerships between Paramount and numerous Chinese media companies, including Alibaba Pictures and CCTV 6.

In September 2016, Moore was dismissed from Paramount after a lackluster fiscal year. It was also rumored that a partial sale of the company to a Chinese corporation played a role in his ousting.

Moore began investing in esports in 2016 with the formation of Phoenix1 Esports. In 2017, Moore became the CEO of Phoenix1. That summer, Moore formed an alliance with Kroenke Sports and Entertainment (KSE) led by Stan and Josh Kroenke. KSE had purchased a new Overwatch League franchise, named the Los Angeles Gladiators, which would launch in 2018. Moore and Phoenix1 oversaw the Gladiators for KSE. In 2018, Phoenix1 was rebranded Sentinels, adding players competing in other esports including Fortnite. In 2019, Sentinels kicked off an aggressive expansion plan, signing one of the most popular streamers in the world, Felix "xQc" Lengyel.

== Philanthropy ==
In 2011, Moore served as a keynote speaker at a Pepperdine leadership and social change seminar. In 2012, Moore was honored at a fundraising event for The Fulfillment Fund, a Los Angeles charity that enables low-income students to attend college.

== Personal life ==
Moore claims to be a devout Christian, and was instrumental in bringing the movie Noah to theaters under Paramount Pictures in 2014.
