= Huangyang Tiantian =

Chinese actress (born 2007)

- Born: Huangyang Tiantian; July 9, 2007 (age 19); Shenzhen, Guangdong, China
- Education: Central Academy of Drama
- Occupation: Actress
- Years active: 2017–present
- Agent: Jay Walk Studio
- Height: 164 cm (5 ft 4 1/2 in)

Chinese name
- Simplified Chinese: 黄杨钿甜
Transcriptions
Standard Mandarin
- Hanyu Pinyin: Huángyáng Diàntián

Huangyang Tiantian (Chinese: 黄杨钿甜, born July 9, 2007) is a Chinese actress. She is best known for her roles in Perfect Match (2025), Reopen My Journals (2025) and Rebirth (2026).

== Controversy ==
In May 2025, Huang faced public scrutiny after posting photos wearing a pair of earrings reportedly worth RMB 2.3 million (approximately US$320,000). Netizens questioned how her family, whose father is a former local government official, could afford such luxury items. The controversy intensified with allegations that the family displayed an opulent lifestyle inconsistent with public-service salaries, leading to speculation about potential corruption. Authorities launched an investigation into Huang's father, Yang Wei, and found no evidence of corruption or embezzlement but noted minor administrative violations. Further investigation revealed that the earrings were not authentic high-end jewelry but replicas gifted to Huang's mother in 2016. Despite this, the controversy affected Huang's career, with reports of her being replaced in projects and facing public backlash.

== Filmography ==
=== Television series ===
Year	Title	Role	Ref.
2017	Princess Agents	young Chu Qiao	
2017	The King's Woman	young Gongsun Li	
2017	Nirvana in Fire 2	young Lin Xi	
2018	Ruyi's Royal Love in the Palace	young Ulanara Ruyi	
2018	Tang Dynasty Tour	Xiao Nan	
2019	The Great Craftsman	young Fu Hanjun	
2019	Listening Snow Tower	young Shu Jingrong	
2019	My Robot Boyfriend	young Jiang Mengyan	
2019	Ming Dynasty	young Sun Ruowei	
2020	I Love Donuts	Tian Tian Quan / Donut	
2020	The Sleuth of Ming Dynasty	Dong Er	
2020	Reunion: The Sound of the Providence	Little Girl	
2020	The Wolf	Hong Er	
2021	The Long Ballad	Zhen Zhu / Princess Tujia	
2021	Faith Makes Great	Zhang Jinhui	
2021	New Horizon	young Wu Di	
2021	Song of Youth	Sun Xiaoxian	
2022	Chinese Paladin: Hui Jian Wen Qing	Zhao Linger	
2022	Being a Hero	young Yang Ling	
2023	Stand by Me	Luo Yuanyuan	
2023	Tiger and Crane	young Qi Yanran	
2023	Da Shi Jie Niu Dan Ji 2	Ren Xiaoqian	
2024	Love in a Dream	Su Qin	
2024	Ming Ri You Qing Tian	Lu Yuqing	
2025	Reopen My Journals	Qian Jiayue	
2025	Perfect Match	Le Shan	
2026	Rebirth	Chu Qiao	
TBA	Ren Yu	Su Lin	
TBA	Guardians of the Lands	Hua Guduo	
