= Xiangling =

Xiangling may refer to:

- Xiangling, Shanxi (Chinese: 襄陵镇), a town in Xiangfen County, Shanxi, China
  - Xiangling County, former name of Xiangfen County
- Xiangling Township (Chinese: 向岭乡), Jinyang County, Sichuan, China
- Xiangling (character) (Chinese: 香菱), fictional maidservant in the Chinese novel Dream of the Red Chamber
- Xiangling, a character in 2020 video game Genshin Impact
