= Zhou Ye =

Chinese actress

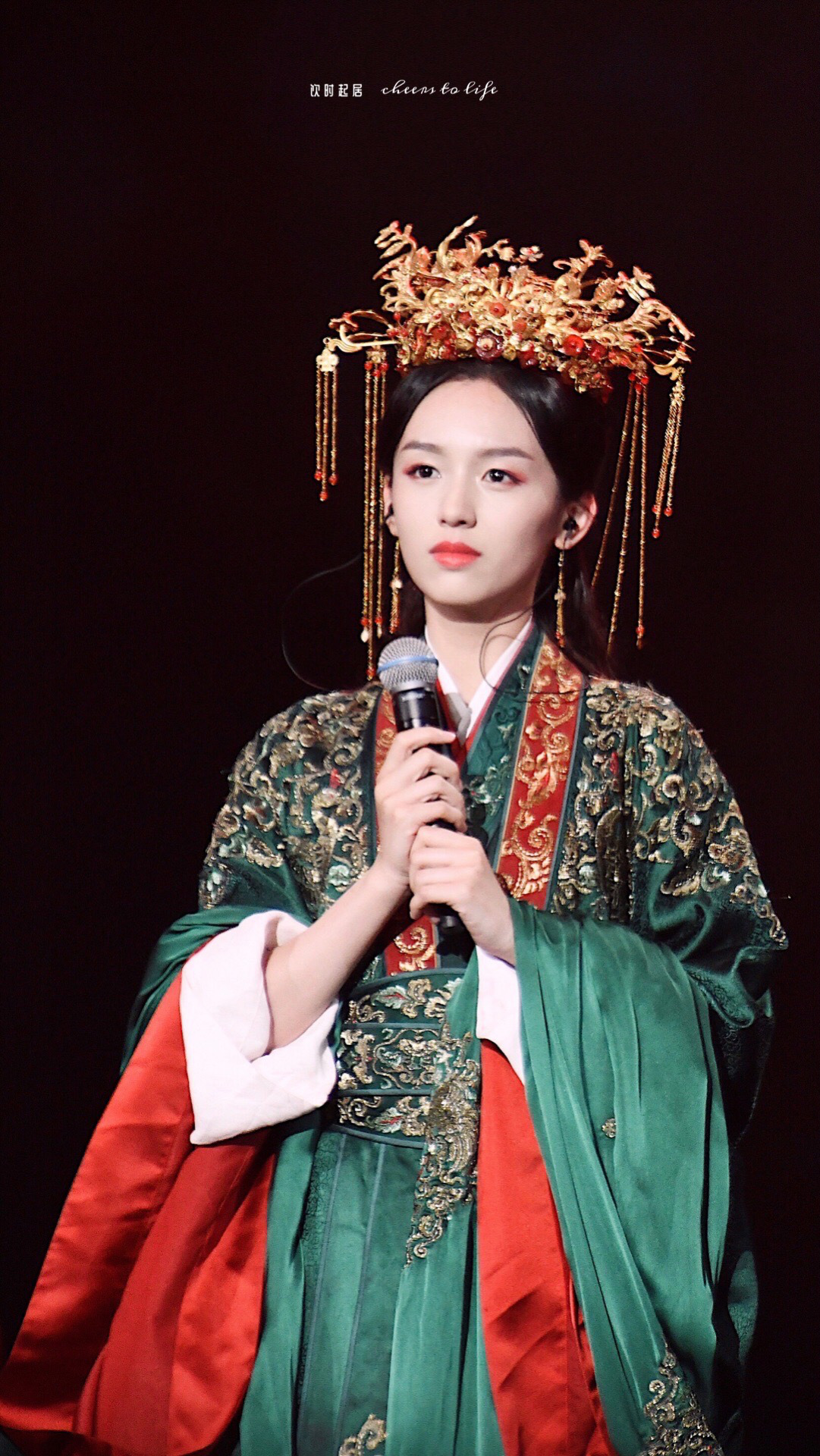
- Zhou in 2021
- Born: May 20, 1998 (age 28); Chongqing, China
- Education: Beijing Film Academy
- Occupation: Actress
- Years active: 2018–present
- Agent: Hesong Media

Chinese name
- Traditional Chinese: 周也
- Simplified Chinese: 周也
Transcriptions
Standard Mandarin
- Hanyu Pinyin: Zhōu Yě

Zhou Ye (Chinese: 周也; pinyin: Zhōu Yě; born May 20, 1998) is a Chinese actress. She is best known for her roles in the films Better Days (2019) and Moments We Shared (2024), and the series Word of Honor (2021), Back from the Brink (2023), Scent of Time (2023), Love Me, Love My Voice (2023), Everyone Loves Me (2024), and Legend of the Female General (2025).

== Early life and education ==
Zhou Ye was born in Chongqing, China in 1998 and moved to Huizhou, Guangdong when she was five years old. There, she attended Hua Luogeng Middle School.

She entered the IELTS class of the International Department in her first year of high school, chose liberal arts in her second year, and transferred to the media class in her third year. In 2016, Zhou took the Unified Entrance Examination for Art Majors in Ordinary Colleges and Universities as well as the National College Entrance Examination. With a national ranking of 36, she was admitted to Beijing Film Academy and became the first student from Huizhou to be enrolled in the school.

== Career ==
In 2017, Zhou starred in her first film work, Beyond Belief, which was released in 2019.

In 2019, Zhou made her debut in the film Better Days, earning recognition for her antagonist role as a bully. For her portrayal of the role, she was subsequently nominated for the "Most Promising Actress" on the China Movie Channel (CCTV-6) M List as well as the "Best Supporting Actress" at the 27th Huading Awards, 14th Asian Film Awards and 33rd Golden Rooster Awards. She participated in the opening ceremony of the 28th China Golden Rooster and Hundred Flowers Film Festival and was included as one of the 32 actors in the China Movie Channel Young Actors Project.

On July 11, 2020, she participated in the recording of the game variety show Happy Camp's summer special program "Stand Firm" broadcast on Hunan Satellite TV.

On February 22, 2021, the costume martial arts web series Word of Honor was aired on Youku, and Zhou played the weird little girl witch, Gu Xiang. On May 4, the revolutionary historical drama The Cradle was broadcast, in which she played Tang Susu, a childcare worker. On May 13, she joined Tencent Video's variety show Wonderland (50km Taohuawu) as one of the "residents" (cast members). On May 14, she participated in the fourth episode of Zhejiang Satellite TV's variety show Keep Running Season 5. On June 12, she won the award of "Promising Actress of the Year" at the Weibo Movie Night 2021. On June 21, the youth campus drama Reset in July was aired on Tencent Video, with Zhou playing the supporting role of Liu Xichuan. On July 1, the historical film 1921 celebrating the 100th anniversary of the Chinese Communist Party was released and Zhou played Yang Kaihui in the film. On July 9, the film she starred in, Chinese Doctors, adapted from true stories in the fight against COVID-19, was released nationwide. On July 30, she participated in Hunan Satellite TV's business experience variety show Chinese Restaurant Season 5. On November 19, the film about the Second Sino-Japanese War, Railway Heroes, was released nationwide, with Zhou playing the nurse Zhuang Yan.

On January 26, 2022, Zhou collaborated with Xiao Shunyao, Jiang Yiqiao and Hou Minghao at the 2022 Hunan Satellite TV Spring Festival Gala to sing the opening song "Fu Hu Yao Qing Chun". On April 22, she participated in the seventh episode of Zhejiang Satellite TV's variety show Ace vs Ace Season 7.

On January 22, 2023, she participated in the 2023 Dragon TV Spring Festival Gala and cooperated with Wang Anyu to cover the song "You Are My Magic" of Accusefive. On April 23, the TV series Youth in the Flames of War was broadcast, with her playing the role of Lin Huajun, the campus belle of the Department of Chinese Language and Literature of Peking University during the years in the National Changsha Provisional University. On April 28, the romance film Yesterday Once More was released, in which she co-starred with Arthur Chen and played Han Shuyan. On May 9, the costume fantasy romance series Back from the Brink was aired on Youku, in which she co-starred with Hou Minghao and played Yan Hui. On August 8, the crime film No More Bets was released and Zhou played the girlfriend of the scam victim in the film. On September 9, the romance fantasy film Flaming Cloud she starred in was released nationwide. On October 13, the costume series Scent of Time was aired on Youku, in which she co-starred with Wang Xingyue and played Hua Qian. On November 30, the urban romance series Love Me, Love Your Voice was aired on Tencent Video, in which she co-starred with Tan Jianci and played Gu Sheng.

On March 1, 2024, the urban romance series Everyone Loves Me was aired on Youku and aired on March 19 on Netflix, in which Zhou co-starred with Lin Yi and played the game concept designer Yue Qianling. On June 22, the film Moments We Shared she co-starred with Peng Yuchang was released, in which she played Cheng Shuang.

On August 6, 2025, the historical drama, Legend of The Female General was aired on Tencent Video, Hunan TV, Mango TV, and iQiyi. The drama is based on the novel of the same name that Zhou Ye portrays a female general, starring with Cheng Lei.

On February 10 2026, Zhou participated in the CCTV 2026 Online Spring Festival Gala.

== Philanthropy ==
In July 2021, Zhou donated 200,000 yuan for the heavy rain disaster in Henan.

== Filmography ==
=== Film ===
Year	English title	Chinese title	Role	Notes	Ref.
2019	Beyond Belief	难以置信	Du Xiaoman		
2019	Better Days	少年的你	Wei Lai		
2021	1921	1921	Yang Kaihui	Cameo	
2021	Chinese Doctors	中国医生	Xiao Wen		
2021	Railway Heroes	铁道英雄	Zhuang Yan		
2023	Yesterday Once More	倒数说爱你	Han Shuyan		
2023	No More Bets	孤注一掷	Song Yu		
2023	Flaming Cloud	三贵情史	Yu Yu		
2024	Moments We Shared	云边有个小卖部	Cheng Shuang		

=== Television series ===
Year	English title	Chinese title	Role	Notes	Ref.
2021	Word of Honor	山河令	Gu Xiang		
2021	The Cradle	啊摇篮	Tang Susu		
2021	Reset in July	陪你到世界终结	Liu Xichuan		
2023	Youth in the Flames of War	战火中的青春	Lin Huajun		
2023	Back from the Brink	护心	Yan Hui		
2023	Scent of Time	为有暗香来	Hua Qian		
2023	Love Me, Love My Voice	很想很想你	Gu Sheng		
2024	Everyone Loves Me	别对我动心	Yue Qianling		
2025	Legend of the Female General	锦月如歌	He Yan		
2026	Dream of Golden Years	你好，1983	Xia Xiaolan		
TBA	Red Dance Shoes	红舞鞋	Lin Xuefan		

=== Variety shows ===
Year	English title	Chinese title	Role	Notes	Ref.
2020	Stand Firm of Happy Camp	快乐大本营之站稳了！朋友	Contestant		
2021	Wonderland (50km Taohuawu)	五十公里桃花坞	Cast member		
2021	Chinese Restaurant 5	中餐厅 第五季	Cast member		
2021	Keep Running 9	奔跑吧 第九季	Guest	Ep.4	
2022	Ace vs Ace 7	王牌对王牌 第七季	Guest	Ep.7	
2022	Three Youths	三个少年	Guest	Ep.9	
2022	The Detectives' Adventures 2	萌探探探案 2	Guest	Ep.1	
2023	Natural High	现在就出发	Guest	Ep.1	
2023	Hello, Saturday	你好，星期六	Guest	20230218; 20230617	
2024	Hello, Saturday	你好，星期六	Guest	20240210; 20240622	
2024	Catch Me If You Can	城市捉迷藏	Cast member		
2025	Hello, Saturday	你好，星期六	Guest	Ep.33	
2025	Laugh Together	一见你就笑	Guest	Ep.17	

== Discography ==
Year	English title	Chinese title	Notes	Ref.
2019	"Starry Oceans"	星辰大海	For China Movie Channel Young Actors Project	
2024	"Confession Scene"	告白画面	Everyone Loves Me OST (with Lin Yi)	

== Awards and nominations ==
Year	Awards	Category	Nominated work	Result	Ref.
2019	China Movie Channel (CCTV-6)	The Most Promising Actress	Better Days	Nominated	
2020	27th Huading Awards	Best Supporting Actress	Better Days	Nominated	
2020	14th Asian Film Awards	Best Supporting Actress	Better Days	Nominated	
2020	33rd Golden Rooster Awards	Best Supporting Actress	Better Days	Nominated	
2021	2021 Weibo Movie Night	Promising Actress of the Year	Better Days	Won	
2021	8th Wenrong Awards	The Most Promising Young Actress of the Year	—N/a	Won	
2021	34th Golden Rooster Awards	Best Supporting Actress	1921	Nominated	
2021	32th Huading Awards	Best Actress in Chinese Costume Dramas	Word of Honor	Nominated	
2022	36th Hundred Flowers Awards	Best Supporting Actress	Chinese Doctors	Nominated	
2023	2023 Weibo Movie Night	Enterprising Actress of the Year	—N/a	Won	
2023	4th New Era International Film Festival	The Most Challenging Actress of the New Era	Yesterday Once More	Nominated	
2024	Weibo Awards	Weibo Breakthrough Actress of the Year	—N/a	Won	
2024	Weibo Movie Night	Expressive Actress of the Year	—N/a	Won	
2024	Weibo TV & Internet Video Summit	Enterprising Actor of the Year	Everyone Loves Me	Won	
