= List of programmes broadcast by Astro Ceria =

The following are a list of programmes broadcast by Astro Ceria in alphabetical order.

- 3 Campur 2 - comedy series, aired in early 2015
- The Adventures of Pinocchio - airing since October 2014
- Alice's Adventures in Wonderland - airing since February 20Anne of Green Gables - first time airing in Malaysia on this channel since November 2013
- Bam Bam Bil - children's variety show, airing since August 2014, also airs on Astro Maya HD
- Before Green Gables - airing since mid-May 2014
- Bob The Builder - dubbed by Filem Karya Nusa, first aired in late 2000s, later on hiatus, returned airing in February 2013 with new episodes; was also aired on NTV7 in original version as of February 2011.
- Boruto: Naruto Next Generation
- Crayon Shin Chan - Air in 2006
- Ceria Fun Day Out - airing in early 2014
- Ceria Xtra #DudukRumah - a gameshow airing since September 2021
- Chibi Maruko Chan - airs season 2 since February 2012, aired Season 1 in 2011, Astro Ceria airs the anime using its own dubbing without dual language option; formerly aired on NTV7 between 2005 and 2010 with Malay dubbing, was also aired on 8TV in 2004 in Chinese with Malay subtitles
- Chichi & Chacha - also airs on Astro Maya HD
- CJ7: The Cartoon (2014) - airing since 2017
- Code Lyoko - airing on this channel as of October 2014; formerly aired on Astro Ria in early 2000s and NTV7
- Dee The Series - aired in early 2015; also airs on Astro Maya HD and Astro Hitz
- Detective Conan - airs newly dubbed versions of already aired series 8 as of November 2013, aired Series 5 as of June 2011, airs Series 7 in November 2010, formerly airs re-runs of early episodes; first aired on 8TV in Chinese with Malay subtitles in 2004, later on TV3 which is Malay dubbed by Filem Karya Nusa, currently airing Series 9, formerly aired the same series as Astro Ceria and had once aired in Japanese audio with Malay subtitles in April 2011
- Detektif Danish
- Didi & Friends - Malaysian cartoon for young children
- Dinosaur Train - Airs back in 2013
- Dr. Slump Arale Chan - Malay dubbing translated from the Cantonese dub of the anime (evidence from the original audio in the dual-language option), airing episodes from 1981 only as of November 2011; formerly aired on TV2 in the 1990s
- Doktor Muda - started airing on this channel in September 2014 with season three; previously aired on TV3 in 2012 and 2013
- Doraemon - Air in 2006
- Dragon Ball - Astro Ceria airs the anime using its own dubbing without dual language option, airing episodes from 1986 only as of November 2011; formerly aired on TV2 in late 1990s and also brief re-runs on TV9 in 2009, the latter version was dubbed by Filem Karya Nusa in the 1990s
- Eori - Korean-Malaysian animated series, also publishes a comic book series
- Geng Bas Sekolah - Season 4 aired in March 2013
- Glumpers
- Grimm's Fairy Tales - airing since February 2015
- Go Astro Boy Go!
- Haa... Kan Dah Kena - candid camera comedy series airing since late 2012
- Hagemaru - re-run as of April 2012, first aired in October 2008 re-run Again of December 2020
- Hari-hari yang Gemilang - Malaysian Chinese novel series from Khow Eve Ping,
- Invention Stories - Chinese animated series
- Kampung Boy - airing as a re-run as of December 2010, formerly aired on Astro Ria in the late 1990s, also in Chinese dubbed version which was first aired on Astro AEC and in 2009 on Astro Xiao Tai Yang
- Kamen Rider
- Kelas 601 Bahasa Melayu - aired in 2014; also firstly aired on Astro Tutor TV UPSR
- Misi Ejen Ceria Bersama Tiger Biskuat - airing in May 2014, also airs on Astro Maya HD
- MumuHug - Chinese animated series
- My Little Pony: Friendship Is Magic
- Naruto
- Naruto Shippuden
- Ninja Hattori - dubbed by Filem Karya Nusa, airing on this channel since late 2011; formerly aired on NTV7 in between 2006 and 2009
- Nussa
- Omar & Hana
- One Piece - airs episodes from 1999 only as of October 2011, Astro Ceria airs using its own dubbing without dual language option; formerly aired on NTV7
- Pada Zaman Dahulu - local animated series; also first aired on TV Alhijrah since 2011
- Pinkfong Wonderstar
- Projek Ceria - aired in late January 2015; also airs on Astro Prima and Astro Mustika HD
- Puasa Datang Lagi - local drama series started airing during the middle of Ramadan 1435H/2014M
- Power Rangers Beast Morphers
- Robocar Poli - airing as of February 2015
- Strawberi & Karipap - children's drama series based on a telemovie of the same name and aired in the same channel, started airing in September 2013
- Super Game Boy The Series - started airing in late March 2015 (name not to be confused with the Super NES peripheral of the same name)
- STEMsasi
- Skunk Fu
- Thomas & Friends - returning as of May 2013 with Season 8
- Tayo The Little Bus
- The Adventures of Nasredin
- Ultraman Kids - airing as of late November 2014 on Monday to Thursday
- Ultraman Max
- Ultraman Neos - airing as of late November 2014 on Friday and Saturday
- Ultraman Zero the Chronicle
- Upin & Ipin - airs Season 1 to 3, first aired in August and September 2011; also airs on TV9 which is its original airing channel
- Ustaz Kata - Information about the month Ramadan presented in doodle-sketch form, sponsored by Vitagen, aired in Ramadan 1434H/2013M
- We Kids Are Powerful - Chinese animated series
- Whazupp Ceria - programme highlights; first aired in December 2012
- Where's Chicky
- Yo-kai Watch
- Zoids Wild
- ^1Produced locally
- ^2Imported and reproduced in-house by Astro
- ^3Imported and Malay dubbed in-house by Astro

== Former/discontinued programmes ==
- Abu the Little Dinosaur - Chinese animated series
- Ada Bakat Ke? - Children's talent compilation using clips from a Tom Tom Bak segment of the same name
- Adi Dan Ayah - Indonesian version of Afi Dan Abah; was also shown on Astro Prima briefly in mid-2010 with Malay subtitles
- Afi Dan Abah
- Anak-Anakku - aired in late 2000s, broadcast of segments in which Aznil Nawawi meets with children in his own programme, Macam Macam Aznil
- Animal Crackers - redubbed version; TV9 formerly airs the original dubbed version in 2006
- Asarichan - Japanese animated series, re-run as of April 2012
- Astro Boy - Malay dubbing made by Sony; formerly first aired on TV3 during Chicky Hour in 2004, later in 2008 on NTV7 8TV, the latter both broadcast the original version
- Backkom - 3 series aired
- Battle B-Daman Fire Spirits - for a short time re-ran another dubbed version; also formerly aired on NTV7 in another dubbing version made by Filem Karya Nusa
- Ben 10 (2016 TV series), aired as a part of collaboration between Cartoon Network and Astro Ceria, which season 1 air weekly in 2 episodes. This must be the comeback of Ben 10 series in Malaysia after the Ultimate Alien which air on TV3 in 2012.
- Belalang - epic Malay drama, some of its early episodes were also firstly aired on Astro Prima
- Billy The Cat - European animated series
- Buttercup Wood - Italian-Chinese animated series
- Captain Biceps - also airing on NTV7 as of November 2013
- Cartoon Family - Spanish comedy series
- Ceria-limpik - local show where celebrities come to selected schools' sports day and have fun with Astro Ceria's viewers, aired in late 2011
- Ceria Popstar - singing reality show airing between May and July 2013, the finals were aired live and simulcast on Astro Maya HD
- Cerianya Ramadan - aired in Ramadan 1434H/2013M
- Chipsmoreland - local adventure reality show aired in 2011, also airs on Astro Ria; formerly aired on TV3 in 2006 using English, 2007 onwards on TV9 using Malay
- Chiquititas
- Chloe's Closet
- CJ7: The Cartoon (2014) - Chinese animated series
- Clever Edisi Malaysia - Science game show based on a popular German game show of the same name; aired its first few episodes on a one-week delay from original airing on Astro TVIQ in September 2010, later re-ran again after the show ended in December 2010 and then re-ran on Astro TVIQ, Astro TVIQ airs Season 2 in late 2011
- Contraptus - French animated series
- Crash B-Daman
- Crime Time
- Cuak - local drama
- Dari Pondok Ke Bosnia - aired in Ramadan 1434H/2013M
- Di-Gata Defenders - also formerly aired on NTV7 in original version, later episodes aired with Malay subtitles
- Digimon Adventure 02
- Digimon Savers
- Doodlez - formerly aired on NTV7
- Dragon Booster
- Dragon Hunters - also airing on NTV7 with Malay subtitles since February 2012; airing on TV AlHijrah Channel since September 2014
- Ello Ello - game show aired in 2011
- Elly & Epit - local drama series aired in late 2011, the last 2 episodes were about parodies of current Malay songs including Awan Nano, supplement programme Elly & Epit Terbaik was aired in April 2012 while a 2-hour special Elly & Epit: Mana Uncle Joe? was aired on 27 May 2012, another telemovie made in early 2013
- Felix The Cat - airs the 1990s series; also airs on 8TV TV9 as of June 2013
- Fifi & the Flowertots
- Fireman Sam
- Funniest Pets and People - compilation of home video funny clips aired in America
- Geng Mengaji Kembali - continuation of Geng Mengaji, aired in Ramadan 1434H/2013M
- Geng Surau - Malay drama series, also airs on Astro Oasis
- Gerak Geri Gasing - children's game show
- Gerald Mc Boing Boing - formerly aired on TV2 in 2005 using original version
- Grenadine & Peppermint - foreign animated series
- Hello Kitty - airs the 2007 anime series
- Elif - Turkish drama series airing in the late 2000s, also aired in TV3.
- I'm An Animal - Irish animated shorts
- Impian Papa - Father's Day special programme aired in June 2011 similar to the related programme Sayang Mama
- Invisible Man
- Jackie Chan Adventures - Malay dubbing made by Sony; was also aired on TV3 with Malay subtitles in late 2000s
- Jay Jay the Jet Plane
- Jim Jam & Sunny - British pre-school live-action characters series
- Just For Laughs Gags - formerly aired on NTV7, airs on Disney Channel Asia as of 2010; formerly aired on Comedy Central, airs on Diva as of 2010
- Kamilah Bintang - singing talent show using programme format from Endemol aired during the year-end school holidays in late 2010; its first concert was also aired on Astro Prima while the final concert was aired live, the normal concerts were recorded
- KAPOWW - Action drama series, formerly aired on Astro Ria in 2010
- Kapten Boleh
- Kau Dan Aku - local teenage drama aired on Astro Ria, had a short run in September 2011
- Kembara Si Manja - aired in early 2012
- Kipper
- Klik - local drama series based on life in a secondary school, season 2 airing in December 2011
- Koni The Giant Boy - Japanese animated series
- Larva - Korean animated shorts; also airing on TV3 as of June 2013 and in January 2014
- The Legend of the Legendary Heroes
- Leon - Canadian animated shorts
- Leon the Lion - French animated shorts
- Little Tornadoes - French animated series, also airing on TV Alhijrah as of June 2014
- Loogy n Num Num - local animated shorts, aired in late 2011
- Loopdidoo - French animated series; Season 1 and 2 are English versions, Season 3 was translated using the original French version
- Lunar Jim
- Maskman
- Mat Kacau (animated shorts based on a character from a former game show called Gerak Geri Gasing)
- Misi Yaya
- Mon Colle Knights - also formerly aired on TV3 between 2003 and 2005
- Monster Kid - Japanese animated series; airs on TV9 between 2009 and 2010, Astro Ceria airs using the same dub as TV9's
- Mopatop's Shop
- Mr Muscleman 2nd Generation - Japanese animated series
- Mustang Mama - Diehard Sports Fan (spin-off series focusing on other sports; also aired on NTV7 as of May 2010)
- Mustang Mama - Football Fever (animated shorts; formerly aired on NTV7 in conjunction with the 2006 World Cup)
- Mustang Mama X3 (later series featuring extreme sports)
- National Junior League - Children's football matches programme aired in 2010; reproduced using Malay commentary, originally shown on Astro Supersport and later on Astro Arena in English commentary
- Ninja Boy - Aired first with re-runs of old Filem Karya Nusa dubs, later using their own dubs; formerly aired on TV2 in late 1990s, during Chicky Hour on TV3 in the early 2000s and NTV7 in 2005
- Nonochan - re-run as of April 2012
- Nonstop Nonsense - aired briefly in mid-late 2008
- Nouky & Friends - foreign animated series
- Origami Warriors - Korean animated series, Malay dubbed without dual language option
- Ozie Boo
- Ozie Boo! Save The Planet - spin-off series
- Papawa - Spanish animated series
- Pic Me
- Pingu - also formerly aired on TV3 in the 2000s, TV3 also aired the 2008 series and after that no longer airing
- Pokémon - airs Season 4 and uses the Japanese version; the earlier seasons were aired on NTV7 in early 2000s using the English version with Malay subtitles and later on TV9 with Malay dubbing
- Postman Pat - also aired on NTV7
- The Powerpuff Girls (2016 TV series)
- Puasa Bersama Ceria - short programme about the celebrities' lives during Ramadan AH 1431/2010, as of Ramadan 1434/2013M with season 3
- Puasa Datang Lagi - local light drama series, aired in Ramadan 1434H/2013M
- Qalesya - Islamic-themed drama series, was also shown on Astro Prima as of June 2010
- Rafeeq - drama series about a man who came from the future through the computer
- Riwayat Kamil - Islamic-related storytelling programme airing Season 2 in August 2011; originally shown on Astro Oasis and Astro Vaanavil
- Roary the Racing Car
- Rupert Bear
- Sahabat - Indonesian animated series
- Samson & Neon
- Sayang Mama - Mother's Day special programme where there will be a home renovation for their mother; aired in May 2011 and May 2012
- Segah Di Nusantara - Indonesian animated series
- Selamat Pagi Cikgu - short comedy series about a group of pupils coming to extra UPSR classes, firstly aired on Astro Tutor TV UPSR in February and March 2012, was also aired on this channel
- Seronoknya Mengaji - Al-Quran teaching programme using the Al-Baghdadi method, previously firstly aired on Astro Oasis and Astro Vaanavil; airing on this channel in Ramadan 1434H/2013M
- Shelldon - foreign animated series, formerly aired on NTV7 in 2010 with Malay subtitles
- Sid the Science Kid
- Super Smash - Badminton game drama series
- Superstar - reality dance competition show aired in late 2012, will be returning in 2013 under the name Ceria Superstar 2
- Tama and Friends - airs both the mid-2000s version and later the mid-1990s version
- Telematch
- Tentang Bulan The Series - airs as a re-run as of December 2010, aired during the month of Ramadan AH 1431/2010; formerly shown on Astro Prima
- Tom Tom Bak - children's variety show
- Tom Tom Bak Siapa Dia - Compilation of Aznil Nawawi interviewing children on one of Tom Tom Bak's segment
- Toopy and Binoo - formerly aired on TV2
- Toriko - formerly aired in TV3 8TV
- Transformers - formerly aired in original version by Astro Ria
- Ultraman Cosmos - also airs on NTV7 as of December 2012, then airs in 2013 for every Saturday
- Ultraman Dyna - formerly aired on TV3 in the early 2000s
- Ultraman Gaia - formerly aired on TV3 in the early 2000s
- Ultraman Tiga - formerly aired on NTV7 in the early 2000s
- Vicky & Johnny - Korean animated shorts
- Zoo the series - local drama on children speaking with animals
- ^1Produced locally
- ^2Imported and reproduced in-house by Astro
- ^3Imported and Malay dubbed in-house by Astro
