= Moments We Shared =

2024 film directed by Zhang Jiajia

- Theatrical release poster
- Traditional Chinese: 雲邊有個小賣部
- Simplified Chinese: 云边有个小卖部
- Hanyu Pinyin: Yún biān yǒu gè xiǎomàibù
- Directed by: Zhang Jiajia
- Screenplay by: Zhang Jiajia
- Based on: Moments We Shared by Zhang Jiajia
- Produced by: Chang Chia-lu
- Starring: Peng Yuchang; Zhou Ye; Ai Liya; Chen Xianen
- Cinematography: Mark Lee Ping-bing
- Edited by: Angie Lam
- Music by: Dong Dongdong
- Production companies: Beijing Jingxi Culture and Tourism; Beijing Baination Pictures; Shanghai Tao Piao Piao Movie & TV Culture
- Distributed by: Shanghai Tao Piao Piao Movie & TV Culture
- Release date: June 22, 2024
- Running time: 131 minutes
- Country: China
- Language: Mandarin
- Box office: US$71.2 million

Moments We Shared (Chinese: 云边有个小卖部) is a 2024 Chinese drama film written and directed by Zhang Jiajia, and based on his novel of the same name. It stars Peng Yuchang, Zhou Ye, Ai Liya, and Chen Xianen. The film was released on June 22, 2024.

== Synopsis ==
Liu Shisan, who had grown up depending on his grandmother for survival, received a message from his mother telling him to study hard, get into a prestigious university, and live a good life. Clumsy and not particularly bright, Liu Shisan studied diligently, sacrificing sleep and rest, only to sadly discover that there are many things in the world that cannot be achieved merely through planning and perseverance. In pursuit of his dreams, Liu Shisan packed his bag and left his hometown, struggling to make a living in the big city. After getting dead drunk one night, his grandmother drove an old tractor for an entire day and night to "kidnap" him back to their hometown.

After returning to his hometown in a daze, Liu Shisan reunites with Cheng Shuang, a girl he had known since childhood. Warm and enthusiastic, Cheng Shuang comes up with ideas to help him sell 1,001 insurance policies in a year. Together, they witness the love story of Niu Datian and Qin Xiaozhen, while their own feelings for each other gradually grow.

His grandmother had already known six months earlier that she had cancer and only half a year left to live. With the help of neighbors and Cheng Shuang, Liu Shisan handled her final affairs. Soon after, Cheng Shuang also had to leave him to undergo surgery at the hospital. Before leaving, she made a lifelong promise to Liu Shisan. With both his grandmother and Cheng Shuang leaving him, each carrying their love for him, Liu Shisan holds onto hope and continues his life with strength.

== Cast ==
- Peng Yuchang as Liu Shisan
- Zhou Ye as Cheng Shuang
- Ai Liya as Wang Yingying
- Chen Xianen as Wang Qiuqiu
- Kong Lianshun as Niu Datian
- Zhang Yifan as Qin Xiaozhen
- Tian Yitong as Mu Dan
- Lin Jiachuan as Wang Yong
- Wang Luodan as Mao Tingting
- Darren Wang as Mao Zhijie
- Victor Ma as Zhi
- Meng Ziyi as Tang Tang
- Michelle Chen as Luo
- Yi Xiaoxing as Xiao Xing
- Wang Tianfang as Xiao Wang
- Qiao Shan as Han Niu
- Liu Haoran as Waiter
- Zhao Lusi as Coffee Shop Owner

== Production ==
The film was approved for production by the China Film Administration in May 2020, with Zhang Jiajia as the screenwriter. A concept poster was released in September 2022, officially announcing the film's production. Filming officially started on June 22, 2023 and Peng Yuchang was announced as the male lead Liu Shisan. In August, Zhou Ye was announced as the female lead Cheng Shuang. The film was mainly shot in Dayan, Fenghua, and Shenquan, Ninghai, in Ningbo, Zhejiang. Filming wrapped on September 12 of the same year.

== Release ==
Moments We Shared was released in theaters in China on June 22, 2024, and was made available on streaming platforms on August 7 of the same year.

== Reception ==
According to Zhejiang Online, the film attracted more than 160,000 tourists to Dayan in Fenghua, Ningbo, one of its filming locations, boosting the income of local farmers.

=== Box office ===
After its release in China, the film topped the daily box office for 11 consecutive days, with total box office revenue surpassing ¥100 million on the second day. On July 3, it temporarily ranked first in the 2024 summer box office in China with a gross of ¥400 million, and ultimately finished fourth in the summer season with a total box office of ¥499 million.
