= A Familiar Stranger =

2022 Chinese television series

- Promotional poster
- Genre: Historical; Romance; Suspense
- Written by: Zhao Lin
- Directed by: Zeng Qingjie
- Starring: Ke Ying; Ryan Cheng; Song Zhaoyi; Wang Zexuan
- Country of origin: China
- Original language: Mandarin
- No. of seasons: 1
- No. of episodes: 18

Production
- Running time: 12 minutes
- Production companies: Mango TV; Sugar Free Culture

Original release
- Release: September 23 – October 3, 2022

A Familiar Stranger (Chinese: 虚颜), is a 2022 Chinese web series directed by Zeng Qingjie. It starred Ke Ying, Ryan Cheng, Song Zhaoyi, and Wang Zexuan in the leading roles. The series aired on Mango TV with 18 episodes on September 23, 2022. The series has a 7.4 rating on Douban from over 78,000 users.

== Synopsis ==
Shi Qi is a painter who often paints courtesans' portraits to find her older sister who was lost in a brothel. One day, she receives a request to paint the picture of the Prime Minister's daughter Shen Qin and her lover, Prince Ning. Shen Qin is betrothed to a general named Xiao Hansheng. In order to avoid her marriage with the general, Shen Qin deceives Shi Qi and uses a sorcerer to swap her face with Shi Qi. When Shi Qi wakes up, she finds that her appearance has changed and she is now married to the general.

== Cast and characters ==
- Ke Ying as Shi Qi (after face swap) / Shen Qin

Shi Qi: An ordinary painter who often paints courtesans' portraits to find her older sister's whereabouts. She was deceived by Shen Qin, and her face was swapped with Shen Qin's through sorcery. Upon waking, she discovered that she was married to General Xiao Hansheng, who had saved her life several years earlier and whom she had fallen in love with.
Shen Qin: The cunning daughter of Prime Minister Shen who swapped her faces with Shi Qi in order to be with her lover Prince Ning.

- Ryan Cheng as Xiao Hansheng
- Wang Zexuan as Prince Ning
- Song Zhaoyi as Shen Qin (after face swap) / Shi Qi
- An Qinfu as Yun Nuo
- Chen Weisheng as Shen Yuan
- Yang Yuanyuan as Yuan Bao
- Hu Dongqing as Ying Xiu
- Xue Yuchen as Fu Ling
- Deng You as Dang Gui
- Zou Zixin as Xiao Qian
- Han Yinlong as Attendant Hai
- Li Man as Real Shen Qin
- Lai Changfu as Physician Ju
- Zhou Yan as Xiao Hansheng's father, Duke of Zhen state
- Wan Yanjing as Bao Mu
- Wang Jin as Fu Xiang

== Soundtrack ==
No.	English title	Chinese title	Artist
1.	"Old Face"	旧颜	Fengming Jiongjun, Yinyao Peifang
2.	"Once Acquainted"	曾相识	Chen Xu, Yinyao Peifang
3.	"Heard the Affairs of Wind and Moon"	听闻风月事	Xiaoshi Guniang, Yinyao Peifang
4.	"An Early Moon"	月如初	Cang Bing
