= Lü Xiaoyu (actress) =

Chinese actress (born 2000)

Lu Xiaoyu
- Born: July 4, 2000 (age 26); Hebei, China
- Other name: Rain Lü
- Occupation: Actress
- Years active: 2017–present
- Agent: Super Up
- Height: 168 cm (5 ft 6 in)

Chinese name
- Simplified Chinese: 吕小雨

Lü Xiaoyu (Chinese: 吕小雨, born July 4, 2000), also known as Rain Lü, is a Chinese actress. She is best known for her roles in Qing Qing Zi Jin (2020), Butterflied Lover (2023) and The Mirage (2025). She is also known for participating in Produce 101 China (2018).

== Discography ==
=== Soundtrack appearances ===
Year	Title	Album
2023	"You Are the Most Unique" (你最独特) (with Luo Zheng)	Perfect Mismatch OST
2023	"Choice" (抉择) (with Wang Youshuo)	Dear Mr. Heavenly Fox OST
2024	"Get Lost" (迷路)	Our Memories OST

== Filmography ==
=== Television series ===
Year	Title		Role	Notes	Ref.
Year	English	Chinese	Role	Notes	Ref.
2017	When We Were Young	人不彪悍枉少年	Xiao Feifei		
2018	Take My Brother Away	快把我哥带走	Miao Miao Miao		
2019	Gank Your Heart	陪你到世界之巅	Lu Yiyi		
2019	When Shui Met Mo: A Love Story	水墨人生	Qiu Shui	Season 1–2	
2020	Beautiful Time With You	时光与你都很甜	Lin Xingchen		
2020	Qing Qing Zi Jin	青青子衿	Wen Renjuan		
2021	Unusual Idol Love	新人类男友会漏电	Ji Nian / Man Tou		
2023	Perfect Mismatch	骑着鱼的猫	Shi Huahua		
2023	Da San Nv Sheng	大三女生	Zhou Yanhong		
2023	Dear Mr. Heavenly Fox	亲爱的天狐大人	Qi Yuanbao		
2023	Butterflied Lover	风月变	Tang Qianyue		
2023	Small Town Stories	小城故事多	Qu Wenwen		
2023	Our Memories	我的少年时代	Wei Xing		
2023	Bright Time	芥子时光	Guo Ying	Guest appearance	
2025	Shadow Love	与晋长安	Qiao Er		
2025	The Mirage	海市蜃楼	Zeng Qian		
TBA	Touch	一半熟人			
TBA	The Lament of Autumn	玉簟秋			
