= CJ7 =

2008 Hong Kong–Chinese film by Stephen Chow

- Official poster

Chinese name
- Traditional Chinese: 長江七號
- Simplified Chinese: 长江七号
Transcriptions
Standard Mandarin
- Hanyu Pinyin: chángjiāng qīhào
Yue: Cantonese
- Jyutping: coeng4 gong1 cat1 hou4
- Directed by: Stephen Chow
- Written by: Stephen Chow; Vincent Kok; Tsang Kan-Cheong; Sandy Shaw Lai-King; Fung Chi-Keung; Lam Fung
- Produced by: Stephen Chow; Han Sanping; Po-Chu Chui
- Starring: Stephen Chow; Xu Jiao; Zhang Yuqi
- Cinematography: Poon Hang-Sang
- Edited by: Angie Lam; Kendall Murillo Montoya
- Music by: Raymond Wong Ying-Wah
- Production companies: Columbia Pictures Film Production Asia; Beijing Film Studio; China Film Group; Star Overseas
- Distributed by: China Film Group Corporation (China); Sony Pictures Releasing (International)
- Release dates: 30 January 2008 (China); 31 January 2008 (Hong Kong)
- Running time: 88 minutes
- Countries: China; Hong Kong
- Languages: Mandarin; Cantonese
- Budget: US$20 million
- Box office: US$47.3 million

CJ7 (Chinese: 长江七号; Cantonese Yale: Cheung gong chat hou; lit. 'Yangtze 7') is a 2008 Chinese-Hong Kong science fiction comedy film co-written, co-produced, starring, and directed by Stephen Chow in his final film acting performance, before he became a fulltime filmmaker. The film was released theatrically in China on 30 January 2008 and in Hong Kong on 31 January 2008.

In August 2007, the film was given the title CJ7, a play on China's successful Shenzhou crewed space missions—Shenzhou 5 and Shenzhou 6. It was previously known by a series of working titles including Alien and most notably A Hope. The film was filmed in Ningbo, in the Zhejiang province of China.

== Plot ==
Chow Ti is a poor construction worker, who lives in a partially demolished house with his 9-year-old son Dicky Chow. Ti is eager to save money so he can continue sending Dicky to private school. Dicky is often bullied by other children, particularly by a boy named Johnny. He is also chided by his teachers at school for his shabby clothes.

One day, while at a department store, Dicky begs his father to buy him a popular robotic toy called CJ1. Ti cannot afford it, and the situation ends badly when Ti smacks the stubborn Dicky in front of other customers. Dicky finds comfort in Ms. Yuen, who is passing by. That night, Ti visits the junkyard, where he often picks up home appliances and clothes for Dicky. He finds a strange green orb left by a space saucer and takes it home, telling Dicky it is a new toy. He is hesitant at first, but later accepts it. On the following evening, the green orb transforms into a cute and cuddly dog-like alien creature that befriends Dicky. After playing with the alien, he learns that it has restorative powers after it restores a rotten apple that fell to the ground. Dicky is very thrilled and names the alien "CJ7".

Dicky dreams about the alien helping him gain popularity and good grades at school. In his dream, CJ7 is a genius inventor who creates various gadgets for him. Upon waking up, Dicky expects CJ7 to help him achieve his dreams, but CJ7 does not understand what Dicky asks of him and embarrasses him by repeatedly defecating on him, causing Dicky to become a laughingstock at school. After school, Dicky throws CJ7 into a garbage bin, but soon realizes that he was the one at fault. He rushes back to try and recover CJ7 from the bin, but it has been emptied by a garbage truck to his dismay. Going home, Dicky finds CJ7 sitting with Ti and the two reconcile.

At school, Dicky shares CJ7's tricks with other students while getting into trouble with his teachers. Meanwhile, Ti loses his job when he gets into an argument with his boss, who accuses Dicky of cheating on his test. He returns home, only to find out that Dicky did cheat. He angrily confiscates CJ7 from him until his grades improve. The next day, Ti's boss apologizes and rehires him with a bonus. Ti falls from a great height during work and is sent to the hospital. Ms. Yuen tells Dicky of Ti's accident just after he passed a test without cheating and informs him that Ti has died. Unwilling to believe this, Dicky tearfully kicks Ms. Yuen out of his house. CJ7 uses up all of his power to revive Ti. The next day, Dicky finds his father sleeping beside him, to his joy. As CJ7 had exhausted its energy to bring Ti back, it dies and turns into a doll, which Dicky wears as a neck pendant.

In the end, Dicky sees a UFO descending onto the bridge before him. To his astonishment, many other alien dogs like CJ7 of various colors and patterns emerge, running towards him, led by one that looks exactly like CJ7.

== Cast ==
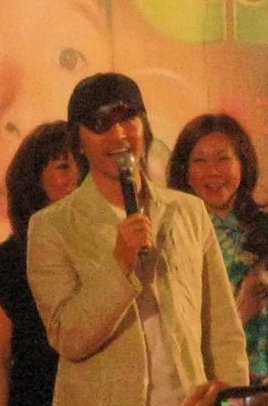
Actor/director Stephen Chow promoting CJ7 in Malaysia

- Stephen Chow as Chow Ti
- Xu Jiao as Dicky Chow
- Zhang Yuqi as Ms. Yuen
- Lam Chi-chung as Chow Ti's Construction Boss and General Contractor
- Jiro Lee as Mr. Cao
- Lei Huang as Johnny
- Min Hun Fung as Dicky's Physical Education Teacher

== Production ==
As with the title CJ7, the earlier working title, A Hope, referred to the Chinese crewed space program. The mission of Shenzhou 6 was completed in 2006 and the real Shenzhou 7 successfully launched in September 2008. The film had a budget of US$20 million, and heavily uses CG effects. Xu Jiao, the child who plays Dicky, is in fact female. She had to cross-dress to be in the film.

Music tracks featured in CJ7 include "Masterpiece" and "I Like Chopin" by Gazebo and "Sunny" by Boney M.

== Homages and retelling ==
References to Chow's other films are made during some scenes, particularly during Dicky's dream sequence. These references include Dicky using his super sneakers to kick a soccer ball into the goal, which subsequently collapses (referencing Shaolin Soccer) and Dicky flying into the sky with his sneakers, jumping from the head of an eagle, seeing CJ7's shape as a cloud and using the Buddha's Palm, (referencing Kung Fu Hustle). The scene where Dicky tosses away his glasses while they self-destruct is a reference to John Woo's Mission: Impossible 2. On one of the DVD featurettes, Chow cites E.T. the Extra-Terrestrial and Doraemon as an influence on the film.

A retelling of the film, titled CJ7: The Cartoon, was released on July 6, 2010.

== Critical reception ==
During its North American limited release, CJ7 received mixed reviews from critics. The review aggregator Rotten Tomatoes reported that 49% of critics gave the film positive reviews based on 81 reviews, with an average rating of 5.3/10. The site's critics consensus reads, "Eccentric and sweet, Stephen Chow's latest is charming, but too strangely and slackly plotted to work as a whole." The percentage is much lower than Stephen Chow's previous films Shaolin Soccer (90%) and Kung Fu Hustle (90%). Metacritic reported the film has a weighted average score of 46 out of 100 based on 18 reviews, indicating "mixed or average reviews".

The film fared no better with local Hong Kong critics. Perry Lam of Muse gave a decidedly negative review of the film: 'We go to see a Stephen Chow movie for its great entertainment value and, occasionally, its terrific cinematic panache. We don't need to be told that we are morally superior because we don't have much money.'

== Awards and nominations ==
Year	Award-Giving Body	Category	Work	Result
2009	28th Hong Kong Film Awards	Best New Performer	Xu Jiao	Won
2009	28th Hong Kong Film Awards	Best Film	CJ7	Nominated
2009	28th Hong Kong Film Awards	Best Supporting Actor	Stephen Chow	Nominated
2009	28th Hong Kong Film Awards	Best Visual Effects	Eddy Wong, Victor Wong & Ken Law	Nominated
