= Legend of the Female General =

2025 Chinese television series

- Promotional poster
- Also known as: Jin Yue Ru Ge 锦月如歌
- Genre: Historical, war, romance
- Based on: 重生之女将星 by 千山茶客 (Qian Shan Cha Ke)
- Written by: Chang Ye, Feng Shuwen
- Directed by: Jiang Jiajun; Peng Xuejun; Da Yuan
- Starring: Zhou Ye; Cheng Lei; Zhang Kangle; Zhang Miaoyi; Bai Shu
- Country of origin: China
- Original language: Chinese
- No. of seasons: 1
- No. of episodes: 36

Production
- Executive producer: Li Eryun
- Producers: Zhang Ruiling; Liu Zhimin; Jiang Wei; Ju Shuo; He Zhichang
- Production locations: Hengdian World Studios; Xiangshan Global Studios
- Cinematography: Wu Zhuoxin
- Editor: Sun Qingzhu
- Running time: ~40 minutes
- Production companies: Tencent Video; Jinghe Media

Original release
- Network: Hunan Television; Tencent Video; Mango TV
- Release: 6 August – 25 August 2025

Legend of the Female General (Chinese: 锦月如歌; pinyin: Jǐn yuè rú gē) is a 2025 Chinese historical drama produced by Tencent Video and Jinghe Media, based on the web novel by 千山茶客 (Qian Shan Cha Ke). Starring Zhou Ye, Cheng Lei, Zhang Kangle, Zhang Miaoyi, and Bai Shu. It premiered on August 6, 2025 on Hunan TV, Tencent Video, and Mango TV. The international version is also available on iQIYI and Netflix.

== Synopsis ==
To secure the family title, He Yan, the eldest daughter, was forced to disguise herself as He Rufei, the only son of the family who has a health problem. When she was young, she met Xiao Jue, who later became General Fengyun, at Xinchang School as his classmate. In an effort to create her own path, she joined the battlefield. Years later, she was appointed to be General Feihong, but her brother suddenly returned to take his identity back and forced He Yan to step down back to an ordinary woman.

After He Yan won over the death that was given by her own family, she disguised herself again as a man with her real name and enlisted in the Yezhou Garrison. Determined to reclaim what is hers and defend the country, alongside Xiao Jue, who is gradually finding her truth.

They both eventually team up to tackle cases and battles, including finding the truth behind Xiao family's tragedy. Also, giving warmth to each other along the journey and becoming the only family for one another.

== Cast ==
=== Main roles ===
Actor	Character	Description	Voice
Zhou Ye (Young: Zhang Yiwen)	He Yan / General Feihong	The eldest daughter of He family and was forced to disguise herself as He Rufei with a mask. Once, she received the title General Feihong, her brother suddenly came to steal the identity back. After surviving death, she attempts to avenge by joining Yezhou military garrison with her real name under a male identity.	Xu Jiaqi
Cheng Lei	Xiao Jue / General Fengyun / Huai Jin	The youngest son of Xiao family. He became the strength of the family and the city after the death of his father. He is the uncle of Cheng Lisu and used to be a classmate of He Yan. People thought of him as a cruel and frozen person who could kill without any mercy. He is called "Lord of the War", General Fengyun. However, he also had a tough journey and a scar in his heart.	Sun Zhicheng
Zhang Kangle (Young: Cui Yixin)	Chu Zhao / Zhi Lan	The favorite student of Xu Jingfu. He is wise, well-behaved, and gentle. He has been lonely since young after his mother died and did not grow up well in Chu family. After the tragic in his life, he met He Yan whom he saw as the light for life.	Liao Yufeng
Zhang Miaoyi	Song Taotao	The cheerful daughter of the chief physician of the Imperial Medical Academy. She enjoys studying poisons and wants to write a book relating poisons. She and Cheng Lisu were forced to engage by their family.	Cai Haiting
Bai Shu	He Rufei	The eldest son of He family who had a health problem when he was young and was taken to be treated at the mountains. After healing, he came back to steal his identity from He Yan by killing her and stepping into being General Feihong.	

=== Others ===
Actor	Character	Description	Voice
People around He Yan
Han Dong (Young: Cai Junxiang)	Liu Buwang / Master Yunlin	He Yan's master and the one who saved her life. He has a love interest with Mu Hongjin.	Peng Yao
Ren Shan	He Yuansheng	He Yan's father	
Zhang Yinyan	Tang Jia	He Yan's mother, who truly loves her daughter.	
People around Xiao Jue
Li Qing	Cheng Lisu	The nephew of Xiao Jue. He is the physician and was forced to engage with Song Taotao. As to flee from marry, he fled to Yezhou Garrison to stay with Xiao Jue.	
Miao Wei Lun	Fei Nu	Xiao Jue's guard and assistant	Ren Jinghao
Ma Tianyu	Xiao Jing	Xiao Jue's older brother and the husband of Bai Rongwei, who is not interested in martial arts and battle.	Wang Yonggang
Mao Xiaohui	Bai Rongwei	Xiao Jing's wife	
Ji Chen	Chai Anxi	The former deputy general of Xiao family. He betrays Xiao Zhongwu in the battle of Mingshui because of misunderstanding.	Shun Zi
Tan Kai	Xiao Zhongwu	Xiao Jue's father, who was betrayed and killed in the battle of Mingshui.	
Zhao Ke	Song Wan	Xiao Jue's mother who suicided after the death of Xiao Zhongwu.	
People around Chu Zhao
Rao Jiadi	Ying Xiang	Chu Zhao's maid and bodyguard, as he helped her from the brothel in the past. She is secretly in love with him and always stays by his side.	Bu Qun
Hou Changrong	Xu Jingfu	Prime minister of Wei, the civil official who is opposed to Xiao Jue. He is the master of Chu Zhao. However, he deeply cares about his only daughter, Xu Pingting.	
Jiang Zhenyu	Xu Pingting	Xu Jingfu's only daughter, who grew up spoiled by her father. She is willing to marry Chu Zhao.	Huang Chenya
Lu Xingyu	Chu Linfeng	Chu Zhao's uncle	
Martine Ma	Chu Mingfang	Chu Zhao's mother	
Li Jiawei	Mrs. Chu	Chu Zhao's aunt	
People around He Rufei
Gao Mingchen	Ding Yi	He Rufei's subordinate and a killer	Bu Qun
Yezhou Garrison
Zhang Yilong	Wang Ba	Yezhou Garrison recruit and He Yan's comrades, later joined Jiu Qi Squad. (Note: Jiu Qi is the squad under Xiao's command. They are the strongest and death squad of Yezhou Garrison.)	Li Nan
Liu Jun	Jiang Jiao	Yezhou Garrison recruit and He Yan's comrades, later joined Jiu Qi Squad.	Miao Xiaofan
Wu Hao	Xiao Mai	Yezhou Garrison recruit and He Yan's comrades, later joined Jiu Qi Squad.	Xu Yan
Fan Linfeng	Huang Xiong	Yezhou Garrison recruit and He Yan's comrades, later joined Jiu Qi Squad.	Tang Guosheng
Peng Zengqi	Zheng Xuan	Yezhou Garrison recruit	
Ruan Shengwen	Shen Han	Yezhou Garrison head instructor	Lu Lifeng
Fan Yining	Lei Hou	Yezhou Garrisonand spy	Chen Qigang
Feng Mingjing	Ma Damei	Yezhou Garrison head instructor	
Jiri Gala	Rida Muzi	General of Leihe, who invades into Yezhou Garrison.	
Wei Wei	Hu Yuanzhong	The spy who was sent to spy in Yezhou Garrison	
Yezhou City
Jiang Chao	Sun Xiangfu	Yezhou City magistrate	
Shu Yaxin	Sun Ling	Sun Xiangfu's son	Li Jing
Sun Zijun	The assassin dancer		
Gangte Muer	Sa Churi		
Wutuo
Duleng Zhana	Ma Ningbu		
Huntun Batu	Na Guer		
Ai Liku	General of Wutuo		
Bodi	Hu Ya te	Wutuo commander who invaded Jiyang City	
Yu Xintian	Wutuo military guard		
Jiyang City
Zhang Zhixi (Young: Snow Kong)	Mu Hongjin	Princess Mengji who fell in love with Liu Buwang.	Young: Zhuda Daner
Shi Yike	Mu Xiaolou	Mu Hongjin's daughter	
Zhang Lei	Cui Yuezhi	General of Jiyang City and a confidant of Princess Mengji. He has a lost nephew who has not seen each other for a long time.	Li Lu
Guan Yue	Young Mu Hongjin's husband	Son of a high-rank official in the imperial court	
Qu Gang	Yun Ji	Taoist master who is Liu Buwang's master	
Dong Yan	Yan Min-er	Yan Ling's daughter in Jiyang City	
Zhang Ruyi	Yan Yan-er		
Pan Xinyi	Maid	Yan Min-er's maid	
Yao Xhen	Ling Xiu		
Chen Junan	Mu Yi	Jiyang City army	
Zhang Yidan	Aunt Hong		
Zhang Yingbing	The third concubine of Cui Yuezhi		
Zheng Ziye	The fourth concubine of Cui Yuezhi		
Rundu City
Jampa Tseten	Li Kuang	The General of Rundu City, one of the eight deputy generals of Fuyue army under the former General Feihong.	
Zhong Qi	Qi Luo	Li Kuang's concubine.	
Chen Yuming	Deputy General Wang	Rundu army.	
Others
Sheng Yilun	Yan He / Yan Nanguang / General Guite Zhonglang	A classmate of Xiao Jue and He Yan, later became the general of Wei Dynasty.	Chen Ziping
Xu Xiaonuo	Xia Chengxiu	Yan He's wife	
Xu Jiaqi	Hua Youxian	Singer	Zheng Yan
Yu Mingxuan	Yang Mingzhi	The magistrate of Chonghuai City. The former classmate of Xiao Jue and He Yan.	
Gou Jun	Yang Zhenping	Yang Mingzhi's father, who is the civil official of Wei.	
Zheng Guolin	Emperor Cheng Ping	The current emperor of Wei Dynasty	Zhou Xiaodong
Yang Mingna	Empress		
Zhu Enyou	Young prince		
Zhang Gong	Mr. Wei	Xianchang Academy scholar	
Zhou Yunshen	Mr. Cheng	Cheng Lisu's father	
Yang Si	Mrs. Cheng	Cheng Lisu's mother	
Hao Wenting	Mrs. Song	Song Taotao's mother	
Cao Jiaxu	Lei Hou's younger brother		
Yu Liyang	Shi Yixin	Young monk from Yuhua Temple	
Shi Hengyi	Cowboy		

== Episodes ==
=== Episode 1 ===
He Yan has spent her entire life hiding her true identity to protect her family's reputation. She has been living as her weak twin brother, **He Rufei**. Disguised as a man, she grows from being an ordinary soldier into being known as **General Feihong**, earning fame for her courage and victories on the battlefield. Despite her achievements, she has never been able to live as herself.

After a devastating battle leaves the Wei Kingdom in crisis, the imperial court blames the respected Xiao family for the defeat. Determined to restore justice and defend the honor of those wrongly accused, He Yan steps forward to take on a dangerous mission. However, court politics and hidden agendas make it clear that the truth matters less than protecting powerful interests.

At the same time, He Yan's own family decides that her role as "He Rufei" has come to an end. Afraid that the secret of her identity will be exposed, they turn against her and try to erase her from existence. Betrayed by the people she trusted most, He Yan barely survives and realizes that everything she sacrificed was for a family that never truly accepted her.

With nothing left to lose, she abandons the false identity she carried for years and chooses to live as **He Yan** once again. Determined, she begins a new journey to reclaim her name, uncover the truth behind the conspiracy, and fight for justice on her own terms.

== Original soundtrack ==
Legend of the Female General Original Soundtrack
No.	Title	Lyrics	Music	Performer	Length
1.	"Light in My Heart" (Chinese: 心海里的光)	Wang Yajun	Jin Dazhou	Zhou Shen	3:27
2.	"Moon Like Song" (Chinese: 月如歌)	Zhang Pengpeng; Jin Dazhou	Jin Dazhou	Curley Gao	3:10
3.	"Embroidered Moon Verse" (Chinese: 锦月书)	Wu Shuting; Wang Yiqing	Sun Aili	Zhang Zining	3:22
4.	"Wish" (Chinese: 夙愿)	Liu Boyang; Yuan Jingxiang	Liu Boyang; Yuan Jingxiang	Zhang Yuan	3:17
5.	"Forget" (Chinese: 忘)	Li Shuangfei	Li Shuangfei	Ning Huanyu	4:07
Total length:					17:23

== Production ==
The drama started filming at Hengdian World Studios on November 28, 2023, and wrapped at Xiangshan Global Studios on March 20, 2024.

In 2025, Li Mingde, who portrays "Cheng Lisu" character, was placed under criminal detention after being involved in property destruction under the influence of alcohol. Resulting in postponement of the drama which had to address the issue, using AI for replacing his face with the new actor, Li Qing. The process finished within a few months and cost around 10 million CNY in total.

== Trivia ==
According to its original novels, both characters Xiao Jue and He Yan have their own swords — Yin Qiu and Qing Lang. There are described that Yin Qiu is white and shining as snow, cold but powerful reflecting Xiao Jue's personality. Qing Lang is clear green as a speedy wind, lighter than Yin Qiu but cuts steel as it cuts the earth reflecting He Yan self. In the series, they both received the swords from Xiao Jue's father.
