= Shadow Love =

2025 Chinese television series

- Promotional poster
- Genre: Fantasy; Romance
- Based on: Yu Jin Chang An (与晋长安) by Jiulu Feixiang
- Written by: Ji Guangguang; Lu Sensen; Sun Tingting; Sun Ziyan
- Directed by: Deng Ke; Gao Congkai
- Starring: Song Yi; Cheng Lei
- Country of origin: China
- Original language: Mandarin
- No. of seasons: 1
- No. of episodes: 38

Production
- Executive producers: Wang Xiao Hui; Deng Ke
- Producers: Dai Ying; Jia Yiqun; Fang Fang Fang; Zhang Yan
- Production location: Hengdian World Studios
- Cinematography: Zhao Yingchuan
- Running time: 40 minutes
- Production companies: iQiyi; Yida Media; Stellar Media; Fat Bear Productions

Original release
- Network: iQIYI
- Release: August 24 – September 7, 2025

Shadow Love (Chinese: 与晋长安) is a 2025 Chinese television series starring Song Yi and Cheng Lei in lead roles. It is based on the novel Yu Jin Chang An (与晋长安) by Jiulu Feixiang. The series premiered on iQIYI from August 24, 2025 to September 7, 2025, with 38 episodes.

== Synopsis ==
Consort Qin, obsessed with Duan Aoze, the Emperor of Yao State, seeks to control him and rule the palace alone through their young son. To achieve this, she obtains the Jade Linglong, an ancient artifact capable of turning a living person into an obedient shadow puppet through a blood contract. However, the Emperor's younger brother Duan Aodeng (Cheng Lei), intervenes and while attempting to save his brother, accidentally absorbs the Jade Linglong into his body. He is later rescued by Li Shuang (Song Yi), General Zhenbei of the Changfeng Army of Taijin State and his longtime rival. Having lost his memories due to the artifact, he is given the name Jin An by Li Shuang, and the two begin a journey together while carrying the responsibilities of their respective states.

== Cast and characters ==
=== Main cast ===
- Song Yi as Li Shuang

General Zhenbei of the Changfeng Army of Taijin State and the adopted daughter of General Li. She rescues Duan Aodeng after he saves her from enemies and later names him Jin An without having any idea about his true identity.

- Cheng Lei as Jin An / Duan Aodeng / Xuan Yike

Prince Annan of the Yao State. He is the younger brother of Emperor who is known to be extremely cruel and cunning. While trying to save his brother, he ended up absorbing the Jade Linglong artifact which gave him otherworldly powers. He was rescued by Li Shuang and was named Jin An after he lost his memories.

=== Supporting cast ===
- Bi Wenjun as Su Muyang
  - Zhou Yuchen as Su Muyang (young)

Crown prince of the Taijin State. His position as the crown prince is often threatened by his older brother who wishes to take over the throne. He and Li Shuang used to be childhood sweethearts, but due to political reasons, the two had to separate.

- Shi Ce as Lu Xin
- Guan Hong as Mo Yin
- Ji Xiaobing as Su Muli
- Gao Maotong as Ji Ran
- Du Chun as Duan Aoze
- Wu Yuheng as Li Ting
- Lü Xiaoyu as Qiao'er
- Ni Dahong as Tai Jin Emperor
- Tan Kai as Li Wei
- Wei Zixin as Jin Wujian
- Zhao Yuanyuan as Empress Dowager Qin
- Sun Zhihong as Huo Du
- Zhou Xiao Chuan as Qin Lan
- Tu Dou as Luo Teng
- Shi Junzhe as Bai Kun
- Jin Tianyu as Shi Du
- Liu Yihong as Ouyang Jun
- Sun Zihang as Wei Heng
- Zhang Jinming as Huai En
- Zhang Tingfei as Cui Yun
- Chang Susheng as Ling'er
- Li Haoxuan as Chen Kuan
- Liu Yu as Tong Rui
- Yu Yue as Fei Ming
- Shi Danjiang as Wang Meng
- Yu Xintong as Yun Ge
- Li Zhao as Yan Zhi
- Zhou Zijie as Nan Xing
- Li Sibo as Jin Bao

=== Guest appearance ===
- Cheng Xiao as Ji Tianjiao

The crown princess and wife of Su Muyang, who was later poisoned by him following his ascension to the throne.

== Soundtrack ==
Part	Title		Artist	Notes
Part	English	Chinese	Artist	Notes
1.	"Above Fate"	宿命之上	Jane Zhang	Theme song
2.	"Exclusive Love"	独爱	Liu Yuning	
3.	"Waiting for You"	为你守候	Song Yi	
4.	"Caressing the Shadow"	抚影	Cheng Lei	
5.	"Will Be Safe"	将安	Huang Xiaoyun	
6.	"Grow Old Together"	白首	Duan Aojuan	
