= CJ7: The Cartoon =

2010 Hong Kong-Chinese animated film by Toe Yuen

- Theatrical release poster
- Traditional Chinese: 長江7號愛地球
- Simplified Chinese: 长江7号爱地球
- Hanyu Pinyin: Cháng Jiāng qī hào ai dìqiú
- Jyutping: Cheong4 Gong1 Cat1 Hou6 Oi3 Dei4 Kau4
- Directed by: Toe Yuen
- Screenplay by: Erica Lee
- Story by: Stephen Chow; Tang Kan Cheong
- Produced by: Stephen Chow; Han Xiaoli; Jiang Tao; Connie Wong; Zhao Haicheng
- Starring: Xu Jiao; Stephen Chow; Shi Renmao; Shi Banyu; Kitty Zhang Yuqi; Dong Jie; Wu Gang; Lei Huang; Fung Min Hang
- Music by: Wai Kai Leung; Sammy Ha; Chow Pok Yin
- Production companies: The Star Overseas Ltd. China Film Group Corporation; Beijing Cinema Animation Production; Emperor Entertainment Group
- Distributed by: China Film Group Corporation; Emperor Motion Pictures
- Release date: 9 July 2010
- Running time: 83 minutes
- Countries: China; Hong Kong
- Languages: Mandarin; Cantonese

CJ7: The Cartoon, also known as CJ7, Love the Earth, is a 2010 Chinese-Hong Kong animated science fiction comedy film and a retelling of the 2008 science fiction comedy film.This film was produced by Stephen Chow, the leading actor, scriptwriter, producer and director of the original 2008 science fiction comedy film and directed by Toe Yuen, who is also the film director of animated feature films such as My Life as McDull and McDull, Prince de la Bun.

== Cast ==
Character	Chinese Voice actor
Dicky Chow	Xu Jiao
Chow Ti	Stephen Chow
Chow Ti	Shi Renmao
Chow Ti	Shi Banyu
Miss Yuen	Kitty Zhang Yuqi
Miss Yuen	Dong Jie
Johnny's dad	Wu Gang
Johnny	Lei Huang
PE Teacher	Fung Min Hang
