= Song Yi (actress) =

Chinese actress (born 1989)

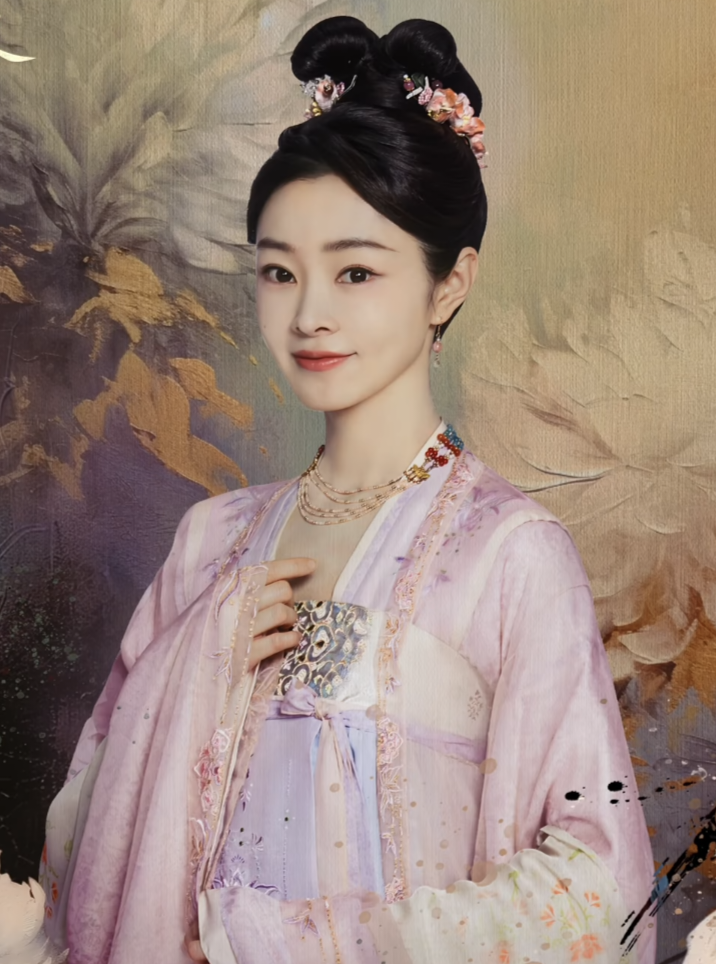
- Song for Follow Your Heart (2024)
- Born: 31 October 1989 (age 37); Jingmen, Hubei, China
- Education: Central Academy of Drama
- Occupation: Actress
- Years active: 2010–present

Chinese name
- Simplified Chinese: 宋轶
- Traditional Chinese: 宋軼
Transcriptions
Standard Mandarin
- Hanyu Pinyin: Sòng Yì

Song Yi (simplified Chinese: 宋轶; traditional Chinese: 宋軼; pinyin: Sòng Yì; born 31 October 1989) is a Chinese actress. She is a Class of 2006 graduate of the Acting Department of the Central Academy of Drama and made her debut in the movie industry in 2009.

== Career ==
In 2009, Song made her acting debut in the drama The Dream of Red Mansions (2010) by Li Shaohong, playing the character Xiangling, officially entered the film and television industry. In the same year, she played the second female Meng Dan in the movie Meng Erdong.

In January 2010, Song first time played as the heroine in starring in the revolutionary historical drama Mao Anying and playing Mao Anying's wife Liu Siqi. In October, in the comedy movie Love Repair Station, she played Wen Xue, a beautiful stewardess who pursued romance.

In March 2012, Song co-starred in the romantic drama The Hawthorn Tree Love with Li Guangjie and Wang Luodan, and played the role of Jing Qiu's best friend Zhong Ping. In order to get closer to the characters in the play, she resolutely cut off the long hair she had left for ten years. In May, she played the lively and cheerful "rich second generation" Cui Cui in the urban emotional drama Spicy Girlfriend's Happy Time. In July, she starring in the family drama As long as you live better than me, as Xia Xiaobai who was ruined with a happy life because of the grievances of the previous generation.

In January 2013, Song starring in the micro-film Smiling Cherry, playing the role of Zhang Xiaoyu, a college student village official who loves the villagers. In July, she co-starred with Yang Yang and Zhang Jiani in the anti-Japanese drama Ultimate Conquest, and played Tang Xueru, the daughter of the elder Tang Siye of Zhongyi Hall. In September, served as the host of the 24th Supermodel Contest Asia Pacific Finals. In November, she played the role of Nan Yan, a girl from the Western Regions, in the costume drama Detective Di Renjie's Love with the Flower and the Golden Man. In December, she starring in the drama Our Jing Ke written by Mo Yan, played the lonely and desolate female protagonist Yan Ji.

In February 2014, Song played Qin Qiuyu, the "Northern Oiran" in the costume drama Wrong Point Mandarin Duck. In June, she starring in the urban emotional drama Baby Project, changed the image of a lady in the past in the drama, played the character of Li Xiaoliang, a girl with pungent personality. In August, she co-starring with Qin Junjie and Guan Xiaotong in the ancient costume martial arts drama Tang Dynasty Boys, as the well-known and well-versed historian Wang Yan. In October, she co-starred with Huang Jue and Weizi in the anti-Japanese war drama Hero Sacrifice, she played Wang Ruoshi, a wealthy daughter with an elegant appearance and a strong heart. In November, she acted as the heroine of the military-themed TV series The King of Soldiers and played the role of nurse Xia Xiaoyu in the drama.

In July 2015, Song played the female college student Chen Jiamiao in the youth campus movie Gardenia Blossoms directed by He Jiong. In August, she co-starred in the spy war suspense drama The Disguiser with Hu Ge, Jin Dong, and Wang Kai. She attracted attention for her role as the tragic and ever-changing female agent Yu Manli in the drama. In November, she co-starred in the period drama Legendary Tycoon with Zhang Han, Ku Hye Sun, and Chen Qiao En, played the optimistic and tough girl Qu Meng. In December, in the urban romance drama Little Lover, she played the lively, cheerful and righteous girl Zubelai.

In February 2016, Song joined the urban music inspirational drama Summer Dreams Rhapsody and played a perverse and domineering violinist Shana. In March, co-starring with Park Hae Jin and Li Fei Er in the urban romance drama Far Away Love, she played the very scheming wealthy daughter Qiao Jiaying. In December, she starred in the spy war drama The Youth with Sharp Flames and played the role of Tang Buyu, a communist intelligence officer.

In February 2021, Song Yi's fame rose after playing her first leading role in a costume period drama My heroic husband starring alongside her highly acclaimed hit drama Joy of Life co-star Guo Qilin, the drama which immediately gained the public attention and hits the top of IQIYI heat index. This lead Song Yi to a top female heroine position and the female actress with the highest views in 2021. In December Song Yi also starred as the 2nd female lead in the highly popular drama Luoyang along Huang Xuan, Victoria Song, and Wang Yibo, this even furthers her recognition and success in 2021.

In May 2022, Song Yi starred in an Anti-narcotics crime drama Day Breaker which was positively received by the audiences.

== Filmography ==
=== Film ===
Year	English title	Chinese title	Role	Notes
2009	Meng Erdong	孟二冬	Meng Dan	
2010	The Love Clinic	爱情维修站	Wen Xue	
2015	Forever Young	栀子花开	Chen Jiamiao	
2015	The Strange House	通灵之六世古宅	Nana	

=== Television series ===
Year	English title	Chinese title	Role	Notes
2010	The Dream of Red Mansions	红楼梦	Xiangling	
2010	Mao Anying	毛岸英	Liu Siqi	
2011	Hawthorn Tree Forever	山楂树之恋	Zhong Ping	
2012	As Long as You Had Better Than Me	只要你过的比我好	Xia Xiaobai	
2012	Cuo Dian Yuan Yang	错点鸳鸯	Qin Qiuyu	
2013	Baby Project	宝贝计划	Li Xiaoliang	
2013	Ultimate Conquest	武间道	Tang Xueru	
2014	Legendary Heroes	英雄祭	Wang Ruoshi	
2015	The Disguiser	伪装者	Yu Manli	
2016	Far Away Love	远得要命的爱情	Qiao Jiaying	
2016	The Flame of Youth	尖锋之烈焰青春	Tang Buyu	
2017	Detective Dee The 4th	神探狄仁杰之琼花金人案	Nan Ya	
2017	Little Valentine	小情人	Zu Beilai	
2017	Stairway to Stardom	逆袭之星途璀璨	Su Cheng	
2017	The Legendary Tycoon	传奇大亨	Qu Meng	
2018	The King of Soldier	兵王	Xia Xiaoyu	
2018	Love in Hanyuan	小楼又东风	Lv Hanzhi	
2018	Entrepreneurial Age	创业时代	Wen Di	
2018	Dagger Mastery	神风刀	Wang Yan	
2019	The Listener	心灵法医	Luo Bixin	
2019	Joy of Life	庆余年	Fan Ruoruo	
2020	Wrinkle, Women, Wonderful?			GQ web series
2020	You Can't Catch Me	南十字星浪漫笔记	Xia Yuan	
2021	Astringent Girl	涩女郎	Dai Xixi	
2021	My Heroic Husband	赘婿	Su Tan'er	
2021	Luoyang	风起洛阳	Liu Ran	
2022	Day Breaker	暗夜行者	Su Qingzhu	
2023	Destined	长风渡	Liu Yuru	
2023	The Nest	蜂巢	Gu Pan	
2024	Follow Your Heart	颜心记	Yan Nanxing	
2024	Joy of Life 2	庆余年	Fan Ruoruo	
2025	Shadow Love	与晋长安	Li Shuang	

== Awards and nominations ==
Year	Award	Category	Nominated work	Result	Ref.
2019	4th China Quality Television Drama Ceremony	Performance Quality Star	—N/a	Won	
2019	CCTV Spring Gala	Youth Role Model	—N/a	Won	
2019	iFeng Fashion Choice Awards	Fashion Elegance of the Year	—N/a	Won	
2020	China Literature Awards Ceremony	Breakthrough Actress of the Year	—N/a	Won	
