= Railway Heroes =

- Traditional Chinese: 鐵道英雄
- Simplified Chinese: 铁道英雄
- Hanyu Pinyin: Tiědào Yīngxióng
- Directed by: Yang Feng
- Starring: Zhang Hanyu; Fan Wei; Vision Wei; Zhou Ye; Yu Haoming
- Production companies: Huayi Brothers; China Film Co., Ltd.
- Release date: 19 November 2021
- Country: China
- Language: Mandarin

Railway Heroes (Chinese: 铁道英雄) is a Chinese war film directed by Yang Feng and starring Zhang Hanyu, Fan Wei, Vision Wei, Zhou Ye, and Yu Haoming. The film follows the story of an anti-Japanese underground army Communist Party in Shandong during the Second Sino-Japanese War. The film premiered in China on 19 November 2021.

== Cast ==
- Zhang Hanyu as Lao Hong or Old Hong
- Fan Wei as Lao Wang or Old Wang
- Vision Wei as Qi Shunt
- Zhou Ye as Zhuang Yan
- Yu Haoming as Lin Dong

== Music ==
No.	Title	Lyrics	Music	Singer	Length
1.	"Playing My Beloved Pipa Again (又弹起心爱的土琵琶)" (Theme)	Lu Mang/ He Bin	Lü Qiming	Andy Lau

== Release ==
Railway Heroes was slated for release on 1 October 2021 in China but was postponed to 19 November 2021.
