= Ke Ying =

Chinese actress

- 柯颖
- Born: January 26, 1998 (age 28); Changsha, Hunan, China
- Education: Shandong University of Arts
- Occupation: Actress
- Years active: 2020–present
- Agent: Mango TV

Ke Ying (Chinese: 柯颖; pinyin: Kē Yǐng; born January 26, 1998) is a Chinese actress. She gained widespread recognition for her leading role as the body-swapping assassin Shi Qi in the breakout historical romance short drama A Familiar Stranger (2022), and has starred in series including Butterflied Lover (2023) and Perfect Match (2025).

== Early life and education ==
Ke was born on January 26, 1998, in Changsha, Hunan province. She developed an interest in the performing arts at an early age and studied Chinese classical dance. She later enrolled in the Performance Department at the Shandong University of Arts, graduating with a degree in dramatic acting.

== Career ==
Ke made her screen acting debut in 2020. She rose to prominence in late 2022 after starring opposite Cheng Lei in the Mango TV micro-drama A Familiar Stranger, directed by Zeng Qingjie. The series became a surprise sleeper hit and garnered critical acclaim for its production value and performances, establishing Ke as a leading figure in China's rapidly growing short-form drama industry.

In 2023, she reunited with director Zeng Qingjie for the fantasy historical romance Butterflied Lover, playing the lead role of Situ Ling.

In 2025, Ke starred as Li Haode (Li Siniang), the determined fourth daughter, in the ensemble historical romantic-comedy series Perfect Match, produced by Mango TV and broadcast globally on Netflix.

== Filmography ==
=== Television series ===
Year	English title	Chinese title	Role	Network	Notes
2021	Hello Debate Opponent 2	你好，对方辩友2	Yin Yue	Mango TV	Supporting role
2022	A Familiar Stranger	虚颜	Shi Qi / Shen Qin	Mango TV	Leading role
2023	Butterflied Lover	风月变	Situ Ling	Mango TV	Leading role
2024	The Immortal Ascension	凡人修仙传	Chen Qiaoqian	Youku	Supporting role
2025	Perfect Match	五福临门	Li Haode (Fourth Sister)	Hunan TV / Mango TV / Netflix	Main cast
