= The Strange House =

- Poster
- 通灵之六世古宅
- Directed by: Danny Pang Phat
- Written by: Chan Pang-Chun; Li Yongqin; Danny Pang; Wong Ho-Wah
- Produced by: Alvin Lam
- Starring: Xu Jiao; Cheung Siu-fai; Zitian Tian; Song Yi; Siyu Lu; Xiuru Bi
- Cinematography: Zhang Ruigeng
- Music by: Wong Kin-wai
- Production companies: Beijing Monster Pictures Co., Ltd. Skyhigh Tree Pictures; Alpha Pictures (Beijing) Co., Ltd. Foshan Jingying Media Co., Ltd. Pin Jing Pictures; Beijing Universe Cultural Media Co., Ltd.
- Distributed by: Beijing Magilm Pictures Media Co., Ltd.
- Release date: 24 July 2015
- Running time: 87 minutes
- Country: China
- Language: Mandarin
- Box office: CN¥16.5 million

The Strange House (Chinese: 通灵之六世古宅) is a 2015 Chinese 3D horror thriller film directed by Danny Pang Phat. The film was released on 24 July 2015.

== Plot ==
Le Rong is chased by her uncles and aunties down to the river before being drowned by them. Yezi is working at a hair salon trying to save enough to pay her overdue rent, and is asked by Zijun to play the role of Le Rong because of their resemblance. Yezi decided to do it after the hair salon is closed down. Over time Yezi's begins to question her sanity as she begins having hallucinations. It is revealed that Yezi is actually Le Rong who is undergoing psychiatric treatment with her uncle Le Zijun. The movie ended with a closeup shot of a message left by Le Rong written in red ink.

== Cast ==
- Eddie Siu-Fai Cheung as Le Zijun
- Jiao Xu as Yezi/ Le Rong
- Song Yi as Nana
- Zi-Tian Tian as Le Rong's aunty
- Si-Yu Lu as Le Rong's uncle
- Xiu-Ru Bi as Le Rong's grandmother
- Teng-Fei Ma as Le Rong's father
- Tan Wan as Le Rong's mother
- Zi-Yao Lin as Le Yang, Le Rong's younger brother

== Reception ==
=== Box office ===
The film earned CN¥16.485 million at the Chinese box office.
