= Zhang Kangle =

Chinese actor (born 2001)

- Born: August 31, 2001 (age 24); Wenzhou, Zhejiang, China
- Education: Beijing Film Academy
- Occupation: Actor
- Years active: 2020–present
- Agent: Honghao Zhile
- Height: 183 cm (6 ft 0 in)

Chinese name
- Simplified Chinese: 张康乐

Zhang Kangle (Chinese: 张康乐, born August 31, 2001) is a Chinese actor. He is best known for his roles in Adventure Behind the Bronze Door (2024), and Legend of the Female General (2025).

== Discography ==
=== Soundtrack appearances ===
Year	Title	Album
2024	"Xi Qiao Youth" (西樵少年)	The Way Home OST
2025	"Star Fire Won't Extinguish" (星火不灭)	The Dauntless Youths OST

== Filmography ==
=== Film ===
Year	Title	Role	Notes	Ref.
2021	Break Through the Darkness	Zhou Quan		

=== Television series ===
Year	Title	Role	Notes	Ref.
2022	I See You Again	Jiang Kan		
2022	Time Seems to Have Forgotten	Sun Zhangyang		
2023	Faithful	Shen Mu		
2024	Adventure Behind the Bronze Door	Zhang Qiling		
2024	The Way Home	He Jiashu		
2025	The Glory	Xiao Shen	Guest appearance	
2025	Legend of the Female General	Chu Zhao / Zi Lan		
2025	The Dauntless Youths	Kun Wu / E Shun		
2026	Rebirth	Yan Xun		
TBA	The Awakening	47		
TBA	League of Legends	Lin An		
TBA	Blossom in Darkness	Yu Wenhao		

=== Television shows ===
Year	Title	Role	Notes	Ref.
2020	Amazing Chinese Characters	Contestant		
