= Xiangling, Shanxi =

Xiangling 襄陵镇
- Town
- Location in Shanxi
- Coordinates: 36°1′10″N 111°23′47″E
- Country: People's Republic of China
- Province: Shanxi
- Prefecture-level city: Linfen
- County: Xiangfen County
- Time zone: UTC+8 (China Standard)

Xiangling (Chinese: 襄陵; pinyin: Xiānglíng) is a town of Xiangfen County, Shanxi, China. As of 2020, it had 29 villages under its administration:

- Jingtou Village (井头村)
- Zhongxing Village (中兴村)
- Dongjie Village (东街村)
- Beijie Village (北街村)
- Nanjie Village (南街村)
- Xijie Village (西街村)
- Zhuangtou Village (庄头村)
- Zhonghe Village (中和庄)
- Xiangyang Village (向阳村)
- Hebei Village (河北村)
- Xiyuan Village (西院村)
- Dongyuan Village (东院村)
- Gonggu Village (巩固村)
- Tunnan Village (屯南村)
- Tunda Village (屯大村)
- Li Village (李村)
- Langquan Village (浪泉村)
- Xue Village (薛村)
- Jing Village (景村)
- Xiyang Village (西阳村)
- Huangya Village (黄崖村)
- Xuliu Village (许留村)
- Nantaichai Village (南太柴村)
- Beitaichai Village (北太柴村)
- Nanchai Village (南柴村)
- Hu Village (胡村)
- Shuangfu Village (双凫村)
- Sizhu Village (四柱村)
- Qi Village (齐村)

== See also ==
- List of township-level divisions of Shanxi
