= Xu Jiao =

Chinese actress (born 1997)

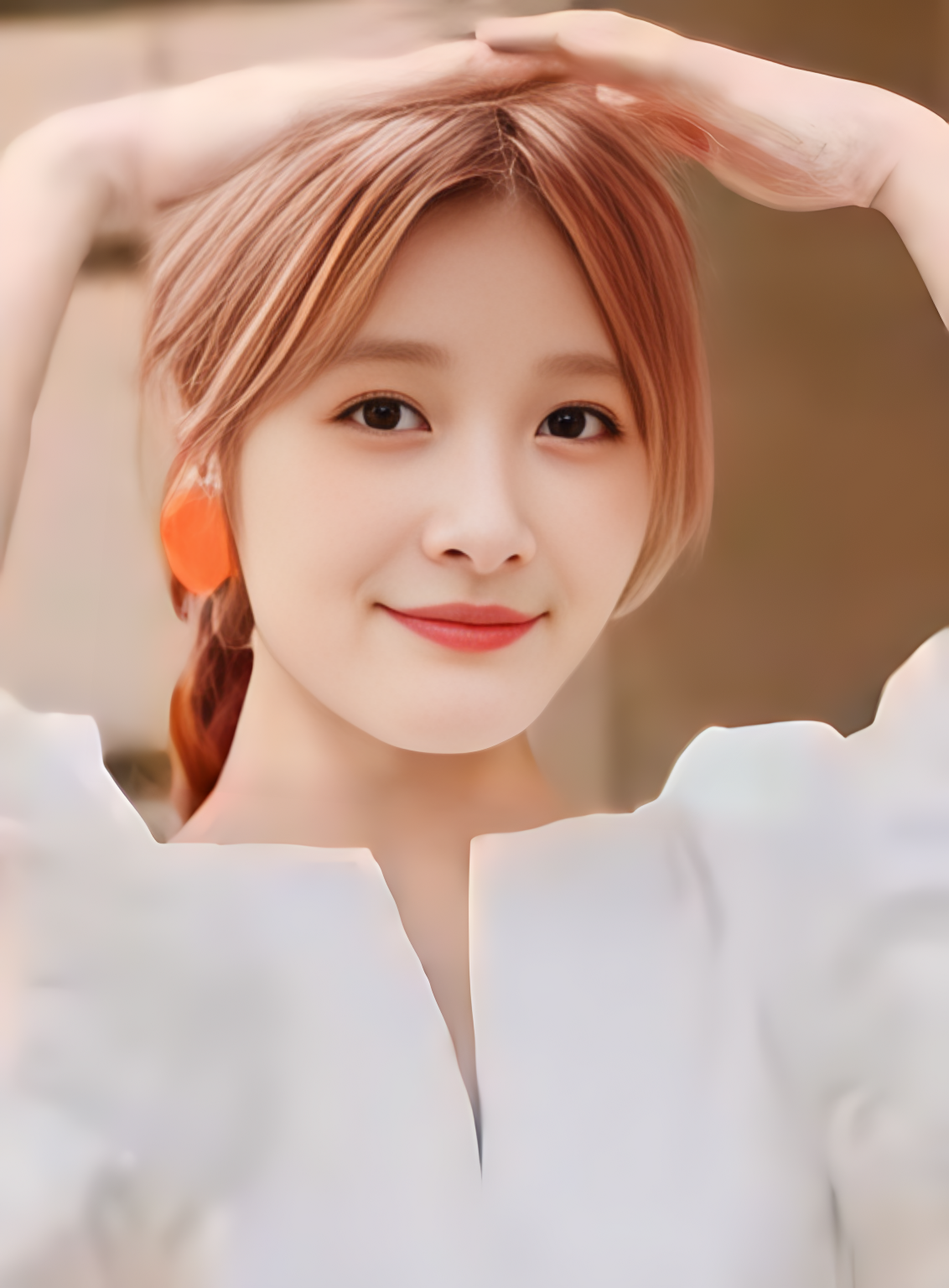
- Xu in 2023
- Born: 5 August 1997 (age 29); Ningbo, Zhejiang, China
- Other name: Josie Xu
- Education: Art Center College of Design
- Occupation: Actress
- Years active: 2008–present
- Agent: Star Overseas Company

Chinese name
- Traditional Chinese: 徐嬌
- Simplified Chinese: 徐娇
Transcriptions
Standard Mandarin
- Hanyu Pinyin: Xú Jiāo

Xu Jiao (traditional Chinese: 徐嬌; simplified Chinese: 徐娇; pinyin: xú jiāo; born 5 August 1997) is a Chinese actress. She made her film debut in the 2008 sci-fi film CJ7 and portrayed Dicky Chow, where she cross-dressed as a boy and won the Hong Kong Film Award for Best New Performer. She is also known for the films Starry Starry Night (2011) and Mr. Go (2013).

== Filmography ==
=== Film ===
Year	English title	Original title	Role	Notes
2008	CJ7	长江七号	Dicky Chow	Hong Kong Film Award for Best New Performer; Hong Kong Film Directors Guild Awards for Best New Performer
2009	Mulan	花木兰	Hua Mulan (young)	
2009	Astro Boy	阿童木	Astro Boy	Voice-dubbed
2010	Just Another Pandora's Box	越光宝盒	Dicky	
2010	Future X-Cops	未来警察	Zhou Qiqi (Kiki)	
2010	The Legend Is Born – Ip Man	叶问前传	Lee Mei-wai (young)	
2011	Starry Starry Night	星空	Xiaomei	
2011	The Warring States	战国	Gou Zi	
2012	Wu Dang	大武當之天地密碼	Tang Ning	
2012	Promise Time	玩命時光	Su Mei (young)	
2013	Mr. Go	미스터 고	Weiwei	
2013	Rhythm of the Rain	听见下雨的声音	Xiao Yu	
2014	Dragon Nest: Warriors' Dawn	龙之谷：破晓奇兵	Liya	Voice-dubbed
2015	The Strange House	六世古宅	Ye Zi	
2017	Growing Pains	会痛的十七岁	Xia Yuanyuan	
2018	Graduation Journey	毕业旅行笑翻天	Lin Anqi	
2019	Miss Forever	一生有你	Fang Yao	
2024	A Place Called Silence	默杀	Huijun	

=== Television series ===
Year	English title	Chinese title	Role	Notes
2016	Ice Fantasy	幻城	Xing Gui	
2017	Midnight Diner	深夜食堂	Customer	Special appearance
2018	Beyond Light Years	初遇在光年之外	Xia Xiaoci	
2020	Heroes in Harm’s Way	最美逆行者		
2022	Love like the Galaxy	星汉灿烂	Cheng Yang	

Awards and achievements
Preceded by Kate Tsui for Eye in the Sky	Hong Kong Film Award for Best New Performer; 2009 for CJ7	Succeeded by Aarif Lee for Echoes of the Rainbow
