= Xiangling Township =

Xiangling Township 向岭乡
- Township
- Location in Sichuan
- Coordinates: 27°48′16″N 103°28′6″E
- Country: People's Republic of China
- Province: Sichuan
- Autonomous prefecture: Liangshan Yi Autonomous Prefecture
- County: Jinyang County
- Time zone: UTC+8 (China Standard)

Xiangling Township (simplified Chinese: 向岭乡; traditional Chinese: 向岭鄉; pinyin: Xiànglǐng Xiāng) is a township of Jinyang County, Sichuan, China. As of 2020, it administers the following seven villages:

- Xiazhai Village (下寨村)
- Shangzhai Village (上寨村)
- Tasha Village (塔沙村)
- Celuo Village (侧洛村)
- Deji Village (德基村)
- Danhongzi Village (单洪资村)
- Huluping Village (葫芦坪村)

== See also ==
- List of township-level divisions of Sichuan
