= Xiangling (character) =

Dream of the Red Chamber character

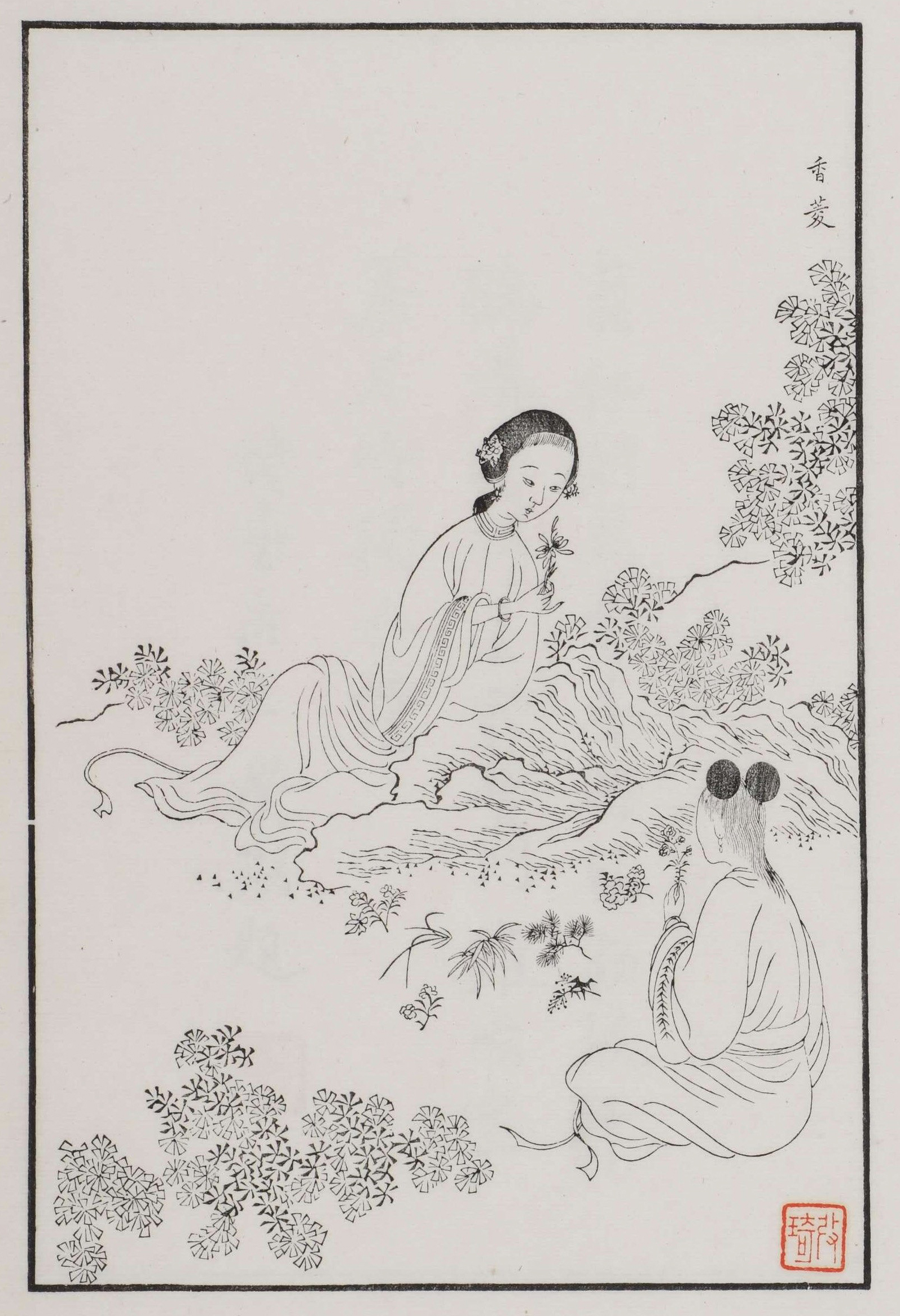
Xiangling

Xiangling (Chinese: 香菱; pinyin: Xiānglíng, rendered Caltrop in David Hawkes's translation) is a character in the 18th century novel Dream of the Red Chamber. She is the primary maid of the Xue household. Originally named Zhen Yinglian (Chinese: 甄英蓮; pinyin: Zhēn Yīnglián), she is the lost daughter of Zhen Shiyin (甄士隱), the country gentleman in Chapter 1. Kidnapped as a young girl on the streets and sold to the Xue family under the name Xiangling (Lotus). Also an unofficial "concubine" to Xue Pan, she is greatly abused by him and later his wife, the cruel Xia Jingui. Xiangling is a kind girl who is much loved by Aunt Xue and Xue Baochai.

When Pan leaves on a business trip and Jingui tries to kill Xiangling, Baochai takes her to the Garden to live with her. There, Xiangling is taught to write verses (Shi (poetry)). In the Cheng-Gao version, Xiangling eventually died in childbirth.

== Media ==
- Xiangling is portrayed by Song Yi in the 2010 television series version The Dream of Red Mansions.
