= Ryan Cheng (actor) =

Chinese actor (born 1993)

Ryan Cheng/Cheng lei
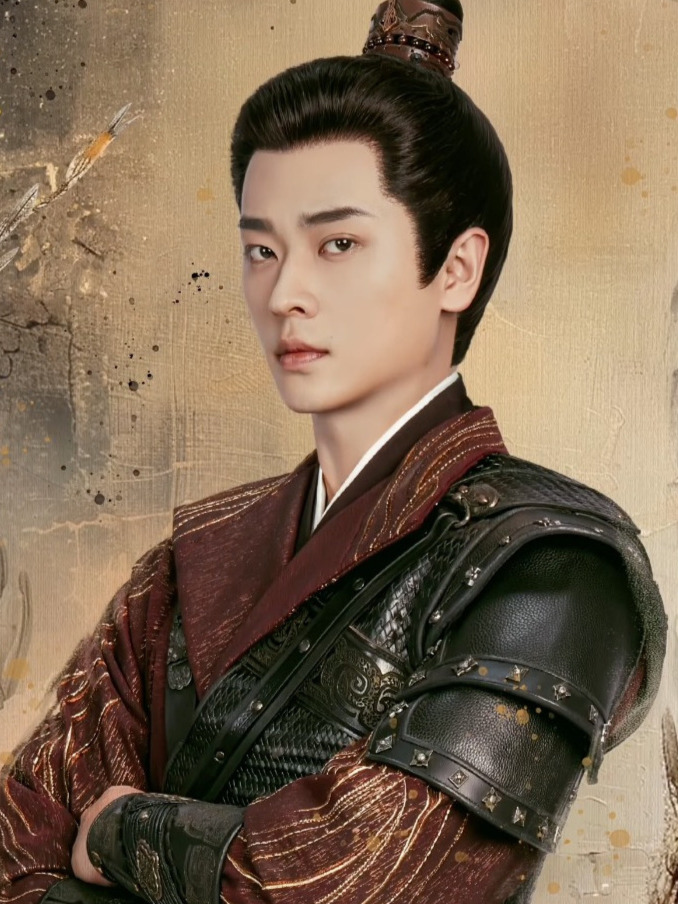
- Cheng for the 2024 drama Follow Your Heart
- Born: Yang Huixiang; December 18, 1993 (age 32); Dongguan, Guangdong, China
- Other name: Cheng Lei
- Education: Hebei Academy of Fine Arts
- Occupation: Actor
- Years active: 2018–present
- Agent: Super Up
- Height: 181 cm (5 ft 11 1/2 in)

Chinese name
- Simplified Chinese: 丞磊
- Hanyu Pinyin: Chéng Lěi

Yang Huixiang (Chinese: 杨辉翔; pinyin: Yáng Huīxiáng, born December 18, 1993), professionally known as Ryan Cheng or Cheng Lei (Chinese: 丞磊; pinyin: Chéng Lěi), is a Chinese actor. He gained early recognition for his role as Xiao Hansheng in the short drama A Familiar Stranger (2022), and later received wider recognition for portraying Gong Shangjue in My Journey to You (2023). He is also known for his lead roles as Xiao Jue in Legend of the Female General (2025) and Xiahou Dan in How Dare You!? (2026).

== Early life and education ==
Ryan Cheng or Cheng Lei was born Yang Huixiang on December 18, 1993, in Dongguan, Guangdong, China. In 2013, he enrolled at the Hebei Academy of Fine Arts, majoring in architectural design, and graduated in 2017. During his studies, he worked as an extra alongside his roommates to support his actor friends. He was later noticed by a director and subsequently signed as a contract actor, marking his entry into the entertainment industry.

== Discography ==
=== Soundtrack appearances ===
Year	Title	Album
2025	"Caressing the Shadow" (抚影)	Shadow Love OST
2025	"Companion for Life" (一生相伴)	Footprints of Change OST

== Filmography ==
=== Films ===
Year	Title		Role	Ref.
Year	English	Chinese	Role	Ref.
2018	You Are My Contra	你是我的魂斗罗	Luo Yufeng	
2018	The Legend of the Golden Palace	金銮藏妖传	Tuoba Hong	
2018	Poker Storm 2: Fatal Mystery	德扑风云之致命迷局	Ye Jiarong	
2018	The Longevity Secret of the Young Heroine	少女侠之长生诀	Chen Yiran	
2020	Bella's Secret	贝拉的秘密	Li Yichen	
2021	The Queen of Attack: True and False Queen	进击的皇后之真假皇后	Jing Qing	
2021	The Queen of Attack: Old Dream Rebirth	进击的皇后之旧梦重生	Jing Qing	
2021	Am I the Queen Mother Today	今天我当上太后了吗	Qi Yu	
2021	Ben Gu Niang Bu Feng Pei Le	本姑娘不奉陪了	Qi Yan	
2022	Double Identity Crown Princess	双面太子妃	Chu Yu	
2022	My Queen of Capricious	我的百变皇后	Qi Hao	
2024	A Poem in Love	不想和你有遗憾	Kang Sai	

=== Television series ===
Year	Title		Role	Network	Ref.
Year	English	Chinese	Role	Network	Ref.
2019	Nothing but Breaking Up Season 2	不过是分手 第二季	Chen Xi	Sohu TV	
2019	Rules of Zoovenia	不可思议的晴朗	Qiao Junhui	Mango TV	
2020	We Are Not Brothers	我们才不是兄弟呢	Zu Bo	Tencent Video	
2021	My Husky Boyfriend	我的哈士奇男友	Bai Jingyu	Mango TV	
2021	The Queen of Attack 1&2	进击的皇后	Jing Qing	Mango TV	
2021	Contractual Love	兄长大人，解约吧！	Leng Yaozu	Mango TV	
2022	A Familiar Stranger	虚颜	Xiao Hansheng	Mango TV	
2022	The Wife's Secret World	妻子的秘密世界	Qin Zheng	Mango TV	
2022	Guyuan Imperial College	谷远山上有书院	Tang Wenqi	Tencent Video	
2023	Exploration Method of Love	爱的勘探法	Guo Ling	Mango TV	
2023	My Journey to You	云之羽	Gong Shangjue	iQIYI	
2024	Follow Your Heart	颜心记	Shang Bieli	iQIYI	
2024	Fangs of Fortune	大梦归离	Cheng Huang	iQIYI	
2025	Legend of the Female General	锦月如歌	Xiao Jue / General Fengyun	Tencent Video	
2025	Shadow Love	与晋长安	Duan Aodeng / Jin An	iQIYI	
2025	Footprints of Change	足迹	Cheng Ao	iQIYI	
2026	How Dare You!?	成何体统	Xiahou Dan	iQIYI	
2026	The First Jasmine	莫离	Mo Xiuyao	Tencent Video	
2026	The Lament of Autumn	玉簟秋	Yu Changxuan	Hunan TV; Mango TV	
TBA	The Leading Stars	许你星河千里	Cheng Zhuo	iQIYI	

== Awards and nominations ==
Year	Award	Category	Nominee(s)/Work(s)	Result	Ref.
2024	Weibo TV & Internet Video Summit	Qinyun Annual Breakthrough Actor	Ryan Cheng	Won	
2024	iQIYI Scream Night	Potential Actor of the Year	Ryan Cheng	Won	
2025	iQIYI Scream Night	Breakthrough Actor of the Year	Ryan Cheng	Won	
2025	Tencent Video Star Awards	Breakthrough Artist of the Year	Ryan Cheng	Won	
